= Rob Zombie discography =

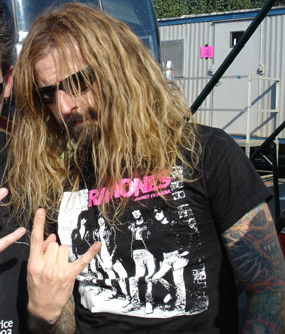
- Studio albums: 8
- Live albums: 3
- Compilation albums: 4
- Singles: 23
- Video albums: 1
- Remix albums: 2

The discography of American vocalist, film director, screenwriter, and film producer Rob Zombie consists of eight studio albums, four compilation albums, two remix albums, three live albums, one video album, twenty-three singles and eight promotional singles. Zombie first rose to fame as a member of the heavy metal band White Zombie, with whom he released four albums; the group disbanded in 1998. Opting to continue making music as a solo artist, Zombie began working on his debut solo album that would come to be known as Hellbilly Deluxe: 13 Tales of Cadaverous Cavorting Inside the Spookshow International (1998). The project became a commercial success for Zombie, charting highly on the Billboard 200 and selling over three million copies in the United States alone. The album spawned three singles, all of which were used extensively in films and video games. Zombie released remixed versions of songs from his debut solo album on American Made Music to Strip By (1999), which peaked inside the Top 40 in the United States.

More than three years after the release of Hellbilly Deluxe, Zombie released his second album The Sinister Urge (2001). The album became his second Top 10 chart debut in the United States, with first week sales exceeding that of its predecessor. The album spawned one official single, though four promotional singles were released for radio airplay in the United States. Zombie released the compilation album Past, Present & Future in 2003, composed of songs from his time with White Zombie along with music from his first two solo albums and soundtrack appearances. The compilation became Zombie's third release to sell over one million copies worldwide, and remains his final album to do so. Zombie's third solo album, Educated Horses (2006), featured a shift in musical style, and debuted at number 5. Educated Horses sold over 500,000 copies in the United States. Next, Zombie released his first greatest hits album, The Best of Rob Zombie (2006). The album was re-released only months later under the title The Best of Rob Zombie: 20th Century Masters The Millennium Collection.

He released his first live album, Zombie Live, in 2007. He returned to music nearly three years later with the release of his fourth solo album, Hellbilly Deluxe 2: Noble Jackals, Penny Dreadfuls and the Systematic Dehumanization of Cool (2010). It became his fourth Top 10 on the Billboard 200, reaching number 8 on the weekly chart. The album saw a decline in sales from his previous releases, selling just over 200,000 copies in the United States. He released the Icon compilation album that same year; it failed to chart. Zombie released his fifth solo album, Venomous Rat Regeneration Vendor in 2013. The album became his fifth Top 10 on the Billboard 200, but it was his lowest selling album. His 2021 album The Lunar Injection Kool Aid Eclipse Conspiracy reached number 1 on Billboard's Top Album Sales chart, his only album to do so.

== Albums ==
=== Studio albums ===
List of albums, with selected details, chart positions, sales and certifications
| Title | Album details | Peak chart positions | | | | | | | | | | Sales | Certifications |
| Title | Album details | US | AUS | AUT | CAN | FIN | FRA | GER | NZ | SWE | UK | Sales | Certifications |
|---|---|---|---|---|---|---|---|---|---|---|---|---|---|
| Hellbilly Deluxe | Released: August 25, 1998; Label: Geffen; Format: CD, LP, cassette, digital download | 5 | 37 | 42 | 2 | — | — | — | 19 | 45 | 37 | US: 2,609,972 (Note: Sales of Hellbilly Deluxe in the United States as of April 2002.) | RIAA: 3× Platinum; BPI: Gold; MC: 2× Platinum |
| The Sinister Urge | Released: November 13, 2001; Label: Geffen; Format: CD, LP, cassette, digital download | 8 | 46 | — | — | 38 | — | — | — | — | 108 | US: 744,859 (Note: Sales of The Sinister Urge in the United States as of April 2002.) | RIAA: Platinum; MC: Gold |
| Educated Horses | Released: March 28, 2006; Label: Geffen; Format: CD, LP, cassette, digital download | 5 | 44 | — | 5 | — | 184 | — | — | — | 90 | US: 500,000 (Note: Sales of Educated Horses in the United States as of 2011.) | |
| Hellbilly Deluxe 2 | Released: February 2, 2010; Label: Roadrunner; Format: CD, LP, digital download | 8 | 23 | 72 | 11 | — | 136 | 82 | 31 | — | 65 | | |
| Venomous Rat Regeneration Vendor | Released: April 23, 2013; Label: Zodiac Swan; Format: CD, LP, digital download | 7 | 36 | 38 | 13 | 27 | — | 60 | — | 49 | 33 | US: 127,000 (Note: Sales of Venomous Rat Regeneration Vendor in the United States as of April 2016.) | |
| The Electric Warlock Acid Witch Satanic Orgy Celebration Dispenser | Released: April 29, 2016; Label: Zodiac Swan; Format: CD, LP, digital download | 6 | 8 | 40 | 7 | 38 | 118 | 40 | — | — | 25 | | |
| The Lunar Injection Kool Aid Eclipse Conspiracy | Released: March 12, 2021; Label: Nuclear Blast; Format: CD, LP, cassette, digital download, streaming | 9 | 10 | 23 | 39 | 22 | 123 | 4 | — | — | 24 | | |
| The Great Satan | Released: February 27, 2026; Label: Nuclear Blast; Format: CD, LP, cassette, digital download, streaming | 54 | 29 | 6 | — | — | — | 15 | — | — | 81 | | |
"—" denotes items which were not released in that country or failed to chart.

=== Live albums ===
List of albums, with selected details, chart positions, sales and certifications
| Title | Album details | Peak chart positions |
| Title | Album details | US |
|---|---|---|
| Zombie Live | Released: October 23, 2007; Label: Geffen; Format: CD, digital download | 57 |
| Spookshow International: Live | Released: February 24, 2015; Label: T-Boy; Format: CD, LP, digital download | 118 |
| Astro-Creep: 2000 Live | Released: March 30, 2018; Label: T-Boy; Format: CD, LP, digital download | — |

=== Remix albums ===
List of albums, with selected details, chart positions, sales and certifications
| Title | Album details | Peak chart positions | | | Sales | Certifications |
| Title | Album details | US | US Dance | UK | Sales | Certifications |
|---|---|---|---|---|---|---|
| American Made Music to Strip By | Released: October 26, 1999; Label: Geffen; Format: CD, LP, digital download | 38 | — | 179 | US: 234,631 (Note: Sales of American Made Music to Strip By in the United States as of June 2000.) | MC: Gold |
| Mondo Sex Head | Released: August 6, 2012; Label: Geffen; Format: CD, LP, digital download | 45 | 2 | — | | |
"—" denotes items which were not released in that country or failed to chart.

=== Compilation albums ===
List of albums, with selected details, chart positions, sales and certifications
| Title | Album details | Peak chart positions | | | Sales | Certifications |
| Title | Album details | US | AUS | UK | Sales | Certifications |
|---|---|---|---|---|---|---|
| Past, Present & Future | Released: September 23, 2003; Label: Geffen; Format: CD, LP, digital download | 11 | 88 | 165 | US: 1,280,000 (Note: Sales of Past, Present & Future in the United States as of January 2007.) | RIAA: Platinum; BPI: Silver; MC: Gold |
| The Best of Rob Zombie: 20th Century Masters The Millennium Collection | Released: October 10, 2006; Label: Geffen; Format: CD, digital download | 166 | — | — | | RIAA: Gold |
| Icon | Released: October 5, 2010; Label: Geffen; Format: CD, digital download | — | — | — | | |
| Essential | Released: June 16, 2014; Label: Universal; Format: CD, digital download | — | — | — | | |
"—" denotes items which were not released in that country or failed to chart.

=== Video albums ===
List of albums, with selected details, chart positions, sales and certifications
| Title | Album details | Peak chart positions |
| Title | Album details | US |
|---|---|---|
| The Zombie Horror Picture Show | Released: May 19, 2014; Label: Universal; Format: DVD, blu-ray | 57 |

== Singles ==
| Title | Year | Peak chart positions | | | | | Certifications | Album |
| Title | Year | US Bub. | US Alt. | US Main. | CAN Rock | UK | Certifications | Album |
|---|---|---|---|---|---|---|---|---|
| "Dragula" | 1998 | 16 | 27 | 6 | 1 | 44 | BPI: Gold; RMNZ: Platinum | Hellbilly Deluxe |
| "Living Dead Girl" | 1999 | — | 22 | 7 | — | — | RMNZ: Gold | Hellbilly Deluxe |
| "Superbeast" | 1999 | — | — | 26 | — | — | | Hellbilly Deluxe |
| "Scum of the Earth" | 2000 | — | — | 25 | — | — | | Music from and Inspired by Mission: Impossible 2 |
| "Feel So Numb" | 2001 | — | 18 | 10 | — | — | | The Sinister Urge |
| "Demon Speeding" | 2001 | — | — | 13 | — | — | | The Sinister Urge |
| "Never Gonna Stop (The Red Red Kroovy)" * | 2002 | — | 23 | 11 | — | — | | The Sinister Urge |
| "Two-Lane Blacktop" | 2003 | — | — | 39 | — | — | | Past, Present & Future |
| "American Witch" * | 2006 | — | 32 | 12 | — | — | | Educated Horses |
| "Let It All Bleed Out" * | 2006 | — | — | 29 | — | — | | Educated Horses |
| "Foxy Foxy" | 2006 | — | 26 | 8 | — | — | | Educated Horses |
| "War Zone" | 2008 | — | — | 26 | — | — | | Punisher: War Zone — Original Motion Picture Soundtrack |
| "What?" | 2010 | — | — | 29 | — | — | | Hellbilly Deluxe 2 |
| "Sick Bubblegum" | 2010 | — | — | 30 | — | — | | Hellbilly Deluxe 2 |
| "Dead City Radio and the New Gods of Supertown" | 2013 | — | — | 15 | — | — | | Venomous Rat Regeneration Vendor |
| "We're An American Band" | 2013 | — | — | 8 | — | — | | Venomous Rat Regeneration Vendor |
| "Well, Everybody's Fucking in a U.F.O." | 2016 | — | — | 20 | — | — | | The Electric Warlock Acid Witch Satanic Orgy Celebration Dispenser |
| "In the Age of the Consecrated Vampire We All Get High" | 2016 | — | — | 14 | — | — | | The Electric Warlock Acid Witch Satanic Orgy Celebration Dispenser |
| "Helter Skelter" (with Marilyn Manson) | 2018 | — | — | — | — | — | | Non-album single |
| "The Triumph of King Freak (A Crypt of Preservation and Superstition)" | 2020 | — | — | 18 | — | — | | The Lunar Injection Kool Aid Eclipse Conspiracy |
| "The Eternal Struggles of the Howling Man" | 2021 | — | — | — | — | — | | The Lunar Injection Kool Aid Eclipse Conspiracy |
| "Punks and Demons" | 2025 | — | — | — | — | — | | The Great Satan |
| "(I'm a) Rock 'N' Roller" | 2026 | — | — | 12 | — | — | | The Great Satan |
"—" denotes items which were not released in that country or failed to chart. "*" denotes promotional only single.

== Music videos ==
List of music videos as lead artist, with directors, showing year released
| Title | Year | Director(s) |
|---|---|---|
| "Dragula" | 1998 | Rob Zombie |
| "Living Dead Girl" (Psycho version) | 1998 | Unknown |
| "Living Dead Girl" | 1999 | Joseph Kahn & Rob Zombie |
| "Superbeast" | 1999 | Rob Zombie |
| "Dead Girl Superstar" (Animated) | 2001 | Unknown |
| "Feel So Numb" | 2001 | Rob Zombie |
| "Never Gonna Stop (The Red, Red Kroovy)" | 2002 | Rob Zombie |
| "Demonoid Phenomenon" | 2003 | Rob Zombie |
| "Return of the Phantom Stranger" | 2003 | Rob Zombie |
| "Spookshow Baby" | 2003 | Rob Zombie |
| "Call of the Zombie" | 2005 | Rob Zombie |
| "Perversion 99" | 2005 | Rob Zombie |
| "How to Make a Monster" | 2005 | Rob Zombie |
| "Meet the Creeper" | 2005 | Rob Zombie |
| "The Ballad of Resurrection Joe and Rosa Whore" | 2005 | Rob Zombie |
| "What Lurks on Channel X" | 2005 | Rob Zombie |
| "The Beginning of the End" | 2005 | Rob Zombie |
| "Foxy Foxy" | 2006 | Rob Zombie |
| "American Witch" | 2006 | Rob Zombie |
| "American Witch" (Animated) | 2006 | David Hartman |
| "The Lords of Salem" (Animated) | 2006 | David Hartman |
| "Mars Needs Women" | 2010 | Unknown |
| "Sick Bubblegum" | 2010 | Rob Zombie |
| "Dead City Radio and the New Gods of Supertown" | 2013 | Rob Zombie |
| "We're an American Band" | 2013 | Rob Zombie |
| "Ging Gang Gong De Do Gong De Laga Raga" (Live) | 2015 | Rob Zombie |
| "Well, Everybody's Fucking in a U.F.O." | 2016 | Rob Zombie |
| "In the Age of the Consecrated Vampire We All Get High" | 2016 | Rob Zombie |
| "The Life and Times of a Teenage Rock God" | 2016 | Rob Zombie |
| "Medication for the Melancholy" | 2016 | Rob Zombie |
| "The Hideous Exhibitions of a Dedicated Gore Whore" | 2016 | Rob Zombie |
| "Get Your Boots On! That's the End of Rock and Roll" | 2016 | Rob Zombie |
| "The Triumph of King Freak (A Crypt of Preservation and Superstition)" | 2020 | Rob Zombie |
| "The Eternal Struggles of The Howling Man" | 2021 | Rob Zombie |
| "Crow Killer Blues" | 2021 | Rob Zombie |
| "Shadow of a Cemetery Man" | 2021 | Rob Zombie |
| "Shake Your Ass-Smoke Your Grass" | 2022 | Balázs Gróf |
| "Punks And Demons" | 2025 | Rob Zombie |
| "Heathen Days" | 2025 | Rob Zombie |
| "(I'm a) Rock "N" Roller" | 2026 | Rob Zombie |
| "F.T.W. 84" | 2026 | Rob Zombie |
| "The Black Scorpion" | 2026 | Rob Zombie |
| "Tarantula" | 2026 | Rob Zombie |
| "Black Rat Coffin" | 2026 | |
| "Sir Lord Acid Wolfman" | 2026 | |

== Soundtracks contributions ==
| Song(s) | Soundtrack | Year |
|---|---|---|
| "Hands of Death (Burn Baby Burn)" | Songs in the Key of X | 1996 |
| "The Great American Nightmare" | Private Parts | 1997 |
| "Ntro" | Quake II | 1997 |
| "Living Dead Girl" | Bride of Chucky | 1998 |
| "Living Dead Girl" | Psycho | 1998 |
| "Meet the Creeper" and "Superbeast" | Twisted Metal III | 1998 |
| "Superbeast" | Hitman Hart: Wrestling with Shadows | 1998 |
| "Spook Show Baby" | Urban Legend | 1998 |
| "Dragula (Hot Rod Herman Remix)" | The Matrix | 1999 |
| "Dragula" | Idle Hands | 1999 |
| "Superbeast (Girl On a Motorcycle mix)" | End of Days | 1999 |
| "Dragula" | Gran Turismo 2 | 1999 |
| "Dragula (Hot Rod Herman Remix)", "Superbeast (Remix)" and "Grease Paint and Monkey Brains" | Twisted Metal 4 | 1999 |
| "Dragula (Hot Rod Herman Remix)" | Sled Storm | 1999 |
| "Perversion 99" | Madden 2001 | 2000 |
| "Dragula" | Book of Shadows: Blair Witch 2 | 2000 |
| "Scum of the Earth" | Mission: Impossible 2 | 2000 |
| "Demonoid Phenomenon" | Nightmare Creatures II | 2000 |
| "How to Make a Monster" | The Watcher | 2000 |
| "Dragula (Si Non Oscillas, Noli Tintinnare Mix)" | Jet Set Radio | 2000 |
| "Living Dead Girl (The Naked Exorcism Remix)" | The Crow: Salvation | 2000 |
| "Dead Girl Superstar" | She Creature | 2001 |
| "Superbeast (Porno Holocaust Mix)" | Valentine | 2001 |
| "Never Gonna Stop (The Red Red Kroovy)" & "Feel So Numb" | Rollerball | 2002 |
| "Iron Head" (with Ozzy Osbourne) | The Scorpion King | 2002 |
| "House of 1000 Corpses", "Everybody Scream", "Run, Rabbit Run", "Pussy Liquor", "Little Piggy", "Brick House" | House of 1000 Corpses | 2003 |
| "The Man Without Fear" (with Drowning Pool) | Daredevil | 2003 |
| "Reload" | The Matrix Reloaded | 2003 |
| "Meet The Creeper" | Jeepers Creepers 2 | 2003 |
| "Two-Lane Blacktop" | Need for Speed: Underground | |
| "Never Gonna Stop (The Red Red Kroovy)" | Walking Tall | 2004 |
| "Girl on Fire (Resident Renholder Mix)" | Resident Evil: Apocalypse | 2004 |
| "Two-Lane Blacktop" | Venom | 2005 |
| "The Lords of Salem" and "More Human than Human (Meet Bambi in the King's Harem Mix)" | The Covenant | 2006 |
| "Demon Speeding" and "Feel So Numb" | Flat Out 2 | 2006 |
| "Let It All Bleed Out" | Scarface: The World is Yours | 2006 |
| "Sawdust in the Blood" "God of Thunder" | Halloween | 2007 |
| "Return of the Phantom Stranger (Tuesday Night at the Chop Shop Mix)" | Max Payne | 2008 |
| "War Zone" | Marvel's Punisher: War Zone | 2008 |
| "War Zone" | Rock Band 2 (download) | 2009 |
| "Superbeast" | Brütal Legend | 2009 |
| "Burn", "Dragula", and "Superbeast" | Rock Band 2 (download) | 2009 |

== Other album appearances ==
| Year | Title |
|---|---|
| 2003 | House of 1000 Corpses |
| 2005 | The Devil's Rejects |
| 2007 | Grindhouse |
| 2007 | Halloween |
| 2009 | The Haunted World of El Superbeasto |
