= Demon Speeding =

Single by Rob Zombie

from the album The Sinister Urge
- B-side: "House of 1000 Corpses"
- Released: July 2002
- Recorded: 2001
- Studio: Chop Shop, Hollywood, California
- Genre: Industrial metal; groove metal; symphonic metal
- Length: 3:43
- Label: Geffen
- Songwriters: Rob Zombie; Scott Humphrey
- Producers: Rob Zombie; Scott Humphrey

Rob Zombie singles chronology
"Never Gonna Stop (The Red Red Kroovy)" (2001)	"Demon Speeding" (2002)	"Two-Lane Blacktop" (2003)

"Demon Speeding" is a song by American rock musician Rob Zombie. It was released in July 2002 as the second and final single from his second studio album, The Sinister Urge (2001). It can also be found on his compilation album Past, Present & Future.

Chris Vrenna, formerly of the band Nine Inch Nails, remixed the song in 2002. This version of the song is entitled "Demon Speeding (Black River Mix)" and can be found on the NASCAR sponsored compilation album entitled NASCAR: Crank It Up and also in the video game FlatOut 2 along with Feel So Numb. The audio sample heard at the beginning of the song, "Why don't you ask me what it feels like to be a freak?", is from the film The Amazing Colossal Man. It has also featured on the Kerrang! Vol. 3 album, however, it was incorrectly named as "Dead Girl Superstar."

== Track listing ==
7" single

Side A
No.	Title	Length
1.	"Demon Speeding"	3:43

Side B
No.	Title	Length
1.	"House of 1000 Corpses"	6:26

Promo single

No.	Title	Length
1.	"Demon Speeding"	3:43

== Personnel ==
=== Rob Zombie ===
- Rob Zombie – vocals
- Riggs – guitar
- Blasko – bass
- Tempesta – drums

=== Production ===
- Tom Baker – mastering
- Scott Humphrey – production, programming, mixing
- Rob Zombie – production, lyrics, art direction

== Chart performance ==
Chart (2002)	Peak position
US Mainstream Rock (Billboard)	13
