= Zombie Live =

Live album by Rob Zombie
- Released: October 23, 2007
- Genre: Alternative metal; industrial metal; nu metal
- Length: 1:10:50
- Label: Geffen
- Producer: Rob Zombie; Scott Humphrey

Rob Zombie chronology
The Best of Rob Zombie (2006)	Zombie Live (2007)	Hellbilly Deluxe 2 (2010)

Zombie Live is the first live album from heavy metal artist Rob Zombie. The CD was recorded over several nights during the band's Educated Horses tour and was said to include a 36-page super-deluxe book of never-before-seen live pictures and a DVD of live footage and animated videos. After the release of the album no artbook or DVD were included with the release of the album. Blabbermouth.net reported that the DVD companion would be available in spring 2008, but this still has yet to surface. A different concert film, The Zombie Horror Picture Show, was released in 2014.

== Reception ==
Professional ratings
Review scores
Source	Rating
AllMusic	3/5 stars

The album debuted at number 57 on the Billboard 200, selling 15,000 copies its first week. The song "The Lords of Salem" was nominated the Grammy for Best Hard Rock Performance in 2009 for the version appearing here.

== Track listing ==
No.	Title	Length
1.	"Sawdust in the Blood"	1:40
2.	"American Witch"	4:01
3.	"Demon Speeding"	3:33
4.	"Living Dead Girl"	3:25
5.	"More Human than Human"	4:23
6.	"Dead Girl Superstar"	3:12
7.	"House of 1000 Corpses"	4:29
8.	"Let It All Bleed Out"	4:08
9.	"Creature of the Wheel"	3:36
10.	"Demonoid Phenomenon"	4:18
11.	"Super-Charger Heaven"	3:29
12.	"Never Gonna Stop (The Red, Red Kroovy)"	3:06
13.	"Black Sunshine"	3:53
14.	"Superbeast"	4:54
15.	"The Devil's Rejects"	3:59
16.	"Lords of Salem"	4:19
17.	"Thunder Kiss '65"	5:19
18.	"Dragula"	5:16
Total length:		1:10:50

== Personnel ==
- Rob Zombie – vocals
- John 5 – guitars
- Piggy D. – bass
- Tommy Clufetos – drums
