= The Best of Rob Zombie =

Greatest hits album by Rob Zombie
- Released: October 10, 2006
- Genre: Heavy metal
- Length: 52:07
- Label: Geffen

Rob Zombie chronology
| Educated Horses (2006) | The Best of Rob Zombie (2006) | Zombie Live (2007) |

Professional ratings
Review scores
| Source | Rating |
|---|---|
| AllMusic | 3.5/5 stars |

The Best of Rob Zombie is a greatest hits album by Rob Zombie, released in 2006 through Geffen Records. It was certified Gold by the RIAA.

== Track listing ==
All lyrics are written by Rob Zombie except where noted.

| No. | Title | Music | Original Album | Length |
|---|---|---|---|---|
| 1. | "Thunder Kiss '65" | White Zombie | La Sexorcisto: Devil Music Volume One | 3:54 |
| 2. | "Black Sunshine" (feat. Iggy Pop) | White Zombie | La Sexorcisto: Devil Music Volume One | 4:49 |
| 3. | "More Human than Human" | White Zombie | Astro-Creep: 2000 – Songs of Love, Destruction and Other Synthetic Delusions of the Electric Head | 4:28 |
| 4. | "Super Charger Heaven" | White Zombie | Astro-Creep: 2000 – Songs of Love, Destruction and Other Synthetic Delusions of the Electric Head | 3:37 |
| 5. | "Dragula" | Rob Zombie | Hellbilly Deluxe | 3:42 |
| 6. | "Superbeast" | Rob Zombie | Hellbilly Deluxe | 3:40 |
| 7. | "Living Dead Girl" | Rob Zombie | Hellbilly Deluxe | 3:22 |
| 8. | "Never Gonna Stop (The Red, Red Kroovy)" | Rob Zombie | The Sinister Urge | 3:09 |
| 9. | "House of 1000 Corpses/Unholy 3" | Rob Zombie | The Sinister Urge | 9:26 |
| 10. | "Feel So Numb" | Rob Zombie | The Sinister Urge | 3:53 |
| 11. | "The Devil's Rejects" | Rob Zombie | Educated Horses | 3:54 |
| 12. | "The Lords of Salem" | Rob Zombie | Educated Horses | 4:13 |

== Certifications ==
| Region | Certification | Certified units/sales |
|---|---|---|
| United States (RIAA) | Gold | 500,000^{^} |
^{^} Shipments figures based on certification alone.

== See also ==
- Rob Zombie discography
