= Dead Girl Superstar =

Promotional single by Rob Zombie

from the album The Sinister Urge
- Released: 2001
- Recorded: 2001 at Chop Shop Hollywood, CA
- Genre: Industrial metal, groove metal
- Length: 2:26
- Label: Geffen
- Songwriters: Rob Zombie; Scott Humphrey
- Producers: Rob Zombie; Scott Humphrey

Rob Zombie singles chronology
"Scum of the Earth" (2000)	"Dead Girl Superstar" (2001)	"Feel So Numb" (2001)

"Dead Girl Superstar" is a promotional single taken from Rob Zombie's second album The Sinister Urge. Zombie considered the song to be a sequel to "Living Dead Girl" from his previous album, Hellbilly Deluxe. It was also featured on the Kerrang, Vol. 3 compilation album in 2002. The song's guitar solo is played by Kerry King of Slayer fame. It is one of the few songs on the album to contain a solo. The song contains audio samples from the 1974 Isaac Hayes film Truck Turner. The song also appears in the game Warzone 2100.

== Personnel ==
=== Rob Zombie ===
- Rob Zombie - vocals
- Riggs - guitar
- Blasko - bass
- Tempesta - drums

=== Guest musician ===
- Kerry King - guitar solo

=== Production ===
- Tom Baker - mastering
- Scott Humphrey - production, programming, mixing
- Rob Zombie - production, lyrics, art direction
