= Two-Lane Blacktop (song) =

Single by Rob Zombie

from the album Past, Present & Future
- Released: September 9, 2003
- Recorded: 2003
- Studio: The Chop Shop, Hollywood, California
- Genre: Hard rock
- Length: 3:02
- Label: Geffen
- Songwriters: Rob Zombie; Scott Humphrey
- Producers: Rob Zombie; Scott Humphrey

Rob Zombie singles chronology
"Demon Speeding" (2002)	"Two-Lane Blacktop" (2003)	"Foxy Foxy" (2006)

"Two-Lane Blacktop" is a song by Rob Zombie from his Past, Present & Future compilation album. The song is named after the 1971 road movie Two-Lane Blacktop but the words "Two-Lane" are never mentioned in the lyrics. Instead, the refrain exclaims "Blacktop Rollin'!" The song was also featured in the racing game Need for Speed: Underground in 2003 and then again in the film Venom in 2005.

== Track listing ==
No.	Title	Length
1.	"Two-Lane Blacktop"	3:02

== Personnel ==
=== Performers ===
- Rob Zombie – vocals
- Patrick Kennison - guitar
- Scott Humphrey – bass, drums

=== Production ===
- Chris Baseford – engineering
- Scott Humphrey – production, mixing
- Rob Zombie – production, lyrics

== Charts ==
Chart (2003)	Peak
Billboard Active Rock	38
Billboard Mainstream Rock	39
