= The Zombie Horror Picture Show =

2014 concert film

- Directed by: Rob Zombie
- Starring: Rob Zombie
- Music by: Rob Zombie
- Release date: May 19, 2014
- Country: United States
- Language: English

The Zombie Horror Picture Show is the first concert film by American musician Rob Zombie, released May 19, 2014 on DVD and Blu-ray. It has a runtime of one hour and twenty one minutes.

== Background/Production ==
This film documents two performances within the tour following the release Venomous Rat Regeneration Vendor. These performances took place on August 3 and 4, during the Mayhem Festival 2013, at the Cynthia Woods Mitchell Pavilion and the Dos Equis Pavilion (formerly known as the Gexa Energy Pavilion). This film was pressured into production by Zombie's manager since his band was the only one that "didn't have a DVD" While he was not enthralled by the idea, Zombie finally caved and started filming once he decided that the band's performances were good enough to be documented and made into an official concert film.

== Synopsis ==
Opening with "Teenage Nosferatu Pussy", viewers get to witness the live performance of a 17-song track list, featuring 16 Rob Zombie originals and a cover of We're an American Band. The multi-media production captures a variety of engaging visuals and theatrics throughout the shows. The performance features on screen visuals, large animatronics, pyrotechnics, costumes worn by the band, and various props used by the band members. The band consists of Rob Zombie (vocals), John 5 (guitarist), Piggy D. (bass), and Ginger Fish (drums). Amongst Zombie's energetic performance, the film also highlights the other band members by including guitar and drum solos. Various clips of the audience are included as well, showing fans in their Rob Zombie inspired attire and lots of topless women.

== Release ==
Upon its release, the film debuted at number one on Billboard’s music DVD chart. It has a rating of 6.2/10 on IMDB. In addition to the film documentation, these shows were also documented by photographer Rob Fenn and published in a photo book similarly titled ‘The Zombie Horror Picture Show’.

== Set list ==
1. "Teenage Nosferatu Pussy"
2. "Superbeast"
3. "Super-Charger Heaven"
4. "Living Dead Girl"
5. "We're an American Band"
6. "More Human than Human"
7. "Sick Bubblegum"
8. "Never Gonna Stop (The Red Red Kroovy)"
9. "Ging Gang Gong De Do Gong De Laga Raga"
10. "Meet The Creeper"
11. "Theme For An Angry Red Planet"
12. "Mars Needs Women"
13. "House of 1000 Corpses"
14. "The Lords of Salem"
15. "Dead City Radio and the New Gods of Supertown"
16. "Thunder Kiss '65"
17. "Dragula"
