= Scum of the Earth (song) =

2000 single by Rob Zombie

Single by Rob Zombie

from the album Music from and Inspired by Mission: Impossible 2 and The Sinister Urge
- Released: 2000
- Recorded: 2000
- Genre: Industrial metal; nu metal
- Length: 2:55
- Label: Geffen
- Songwriters: Rob Zombie; Scott Humphrey
- Producers: Rob Zombie; Scott Humphrey

Rob Zombie singles chronology
"Superbeast" (1999)	"Scum of the Earth" (2000)	"Dead Girl Superstar" (2001)

"Scum of the Earth"is a song by heavy metal musician Rob Zombie. It was originally featured on the Mission: Impossible 2 soundtrack and later included on Zombie's album, The Sinister Urge as the lead single. It found considerable radio play upon release.

The song features an intense chorus featuring heavy guitars and a repetitive "hey!" chant. The final chorus culminates with female background vocals.

Rob Zombie guitarist Riggs formed a band in 2003, sharing the name with this song.

== Personnel ==
=== Rob Zombie ===
- Rob Zombie – vocals
- Riggs – guitar
- Blasko – bass
- Tempesta – drums

=== Production ===
- Tom Baker – mastering
- Scott Humphrey – production, programming, mixing
- Rob Zombie – production, lyrics, art direction
