= House of 1000 Corpses (song) =

Song by Rob Zombie

from the album The Sinister Urge and House of 1000 Corpses
- Released: November 13, 2001
- Recorded: 2001 at Chop Shop Hollywood, CA
- Genre: Alternative metal
- Length: 6:26; 3:43 (soundtrack version)
- Label: Geffen
- Songwriters: Rob Zombie; Scott Humphrey
- Producers: Scott Humphrey; Rob Zombie

"House of 1000 Corpses" is the final track on Rob Zombie's second solo album The Sinister Urge. The song was used in the 2003 horror movie of the same name, which was written and directed by Zombie.

== Review ==
The song features audio clips from Ilsa, She Wolf of the SS. Although the song runs for 9:26 on the album, the song itself only runs for 6:26. There is about a minute of static noise and then a hidden song titled "Unholy Three" (starts at 7:45) which occupies the remainder of the track. This is the second time Zombie has made extended pieces of music, the first being the 11-minute "Blood, Milk and Sky", released under Zombie's previous band, White Zombie.

== Release ==
The song also makes an appearance on Zombie's greatest hits album The Best of Rob Zombie.

== Production ==
It is used over the opening credits to the horror movie of the same name, which was written and directed by Zombie, and appears on the movie's soundtrack album.

== Credits ==
=== Rob Zombie ===
- Rob Zombie - vocals
- Riggs - guitar
- Blasko - bass
- Tempesta - drums

=== Production ===
- Tom Baker - mastering
- Scott Humphrey - production, programming, mixing
- Rob Zombie - production, lyrics, art direction

== Covers ==
The song was covered by Skoink for The Electro-Industrial Tribute to Rob Zombie in 2002. It was also covered by Zombie Girl in 2007 on their Blood, Brains & Rock 'n' Roll album.
