= Never Gonna Stop (The Red Red Kroovy) =

"Never Gonna Stop (The Red, Red Kroovy)"

Promotional single by Rob Zombie

from the album The Sinister Urge
- Released: 2001
- Recorded: 2001
- Studio: Chop Shop, Hollywood, California
- Genre: Alternative metal; funk rock
- Length: 3:09
- Label: Geffen
- Songwriters: Rob Zombie, Scott Humphrey
- Producers: Rob Zombie, Scott Humphrey

Rob Zombie singles chronology
"Feel So Numb" (2001)	"Never Gonna Stop (The Red, Red Kroovy)" (2001)	"Demon Speeding" (2002)

Music video
- "Never Gonna Stop (The Red Red Kroovy)" on YouTube

"Never Gonna Stop (The Red, Red Kroovy)" is a promotional single taken from Rob Zombie's second album The Sinister Urge. The song can also be found on Zombie's Past, Present & Future and The Best of Rob Zombie. It was nominated for the Grammy for Best Metal Performance for the 2003 Grammy Awards Ceremony, but lost to Korn's "Here to Stay".

The song is based on Anthony Burgess' 1962 novel, A Clockwork Orange. The phrase "red red kroovy" is used by Alex DeLarge in the book and means "red red blood" ("krov'", means "blood" in Russian). (Anthony Burgess’ Nadsat glossary in the novel shows the spelling to be “krovvy”, not kroovy: ('krovvy:' [Russian > krovy' ] blood))

The lyrics include the phrases "See heaven, flash, a horrorshow..." and "...take me to the home..." which are also both references to the book. The audio sample "Use my body to keep you alive" is from the 1969 horror film The Curious Dr. Humpp.

The song was included on the soundtrack to the movies Rollerball (2002) and Walking Tall (2004), as well as the Atari game Test Drive: Eve of Destruction. It was also used as WWE wrestler Edge's entrance music from 2001 to 2004. A remix of the song, The Black Cat Crossing Mix, was included on WWF Forceable Entry. Rob Zombie used clips of the anime show Kekko Kamen during the song on the 2010 Mayhem Festival and 2022 Freaks on Parade tours.

== Music video ==
In the music video for "Never Gonna Stop," Zombie and others are dressed as Alex DeLarge and his droogs from the film of A Clockwork Orange. In reference to two of the film's scenes, they appear in the Korova Milk Bar, and go on a wild ride in a stolen "Durango 95". The actor Tom Towles, who played Lieutenant George Wydell in Rob Zombie's film House of 1000 Corpses, appears in the video.

Two versions exist for the video. One that has scenes from Rollerball inter-cut with the ones of Zombie, and the original version which has neither.

== Influence ==
In 2011, mixologist Darcy O'Neil was inspired by the video to create a red-colored cocktail, echoing Burgess's Nadsat term "kroovy" as blood.

== Personnel ==
=== Rob Zombie ===
- Rob Zombie – vocals
- Riggs – guitar
- Blasko – bass
- Tempesta – drums

=== Production ===
- Tom Baker – mastering
- Scott Humphrey – production, programming, mixing
- Rob Zombie – production, art direction

== Charts ==
Chart (2002)	Peak position
US Mainstream Rock Tracks (Billboard)	11
US Modern Rock Tracks (Billboard)	23
