= Past, Present & Future (Rob Zombie album) =

Compilation album by Rob Zombie
- Released: September 23, 2003
- Recorded: 1991–2003
- Genre: Industrial metal
- Length: 73:20
- Label: Geffen
- Producer: Scott Humphrey

Rob Zombie chronology
The Sinister Urge (2001)	Past, Present & Future (2003)	Educated Horses (2006)

Singles from Past, Present & Future
- 1. "Two Lane Blacktop" Released: September 9, 2003

Professional ratings
Review scores
Source	Rating
AllMusic	4.5/5 stars
The Encyclopedia of Popular Music	3/5 stars
PopMatters	(positive)
The Rolling Stone Album Guide	4/5 stars

Past, Present & Future is a 2003 retrospective collection of the music of Rob Zombie. It includes selections of his work with White Zombie and his solo career, as well as two previously unreleased tracks. It won a Metal Edge Readers' Choice Award for Compilation Album of the Year.

The explicit version includes a bonus DVD with ten of Rob Zombie's / White Zombie's music videos; all are edited versions.

== Track listing ==
All lyrics are written by Rob Zombie except where noted.

No.	Title	Music	Original Album	Length
1.	"Thunder Kiss '65"	White Zombie	La Sexorcisto: Devil Music, Vol. 1	3:54
2.	"Black Sunshine" (feat. Iggy Pop)	White Zombie	La Sexorcisto: Devil Music, Vol. 1	4:49
3.	"Feed the Gods"	White Zombie	Airheads soundtrack	4:30
4.	"More Human than Human"	White Zombie	Astro-Creep: 2000	4:28
5.	"Super Charger Heaven"	White Zombie	Astro-Creep: 2000	3:37
6.	"I'm Your Boogieman"	KC and the Sunshine Band ^{1}	The Crow: City of Angels soundtrack	4:27
7.	"Hands of Death (Burn Baby Burn)" (feat. Alice Cooper)	Rob Zombie, Charlie Clouser	Songs in the Key of X	4:12
8.	"The Great American Nightmare" (feat. Howard Stern)	Rob Zombie, Charlie Clouser	Private Parts soundtrack	3:54
9.	"Dragula"	Rob Zombie, Scott Humphrey	Hellbilly Deluxe	3:42
10.	"Living Dead Girl"	Rob Zombie, Scott Humphrey	Hellbilly Deluxe	3:22
11.	"Superbeast"	Rob Zombie, Scott Humphrey, Charlie Clouser	Hellbilly Deluxe	3:40
12.	"Feel So Numb"	Rob Zombie, Scott Humphrey	The Sinister Urge	3:53
13.	"Never Gonna Stop (The Red Red Kroovy)"	Rob Zombie, Scott Humphrey	The Sinister Urge	3:10
14.	"Demon Speeding"	Rob Zombie, Scott Humphrey	The Sinister Urge	3:44
15.	"Brick House 2003" (feat. Lionel Richie and Trina)	The Commodores ^{2}	House of 1000 Corpses soundtrack	3:48
16.	"Pussy Liquor"	Rob Zombie, Scott Humphrey	House of 1000 Corpses soundtrack	4:46
17.	"Blitzkrieg Bop"	The Ramones ^{3}	We're a Happy Family	2:43
18.	"Two-Lane Blacktop" (previously unreleased)	Rob Zombie, Scott Humphrey		3:02
19.	"Girl on Fire" (previously unreleased)	Rob Zombie, Scott Humphrey		3:29

Lyrics

^{1} Richard Raymond Finch, Harry Wayne Casey
^{2} Lionel B. Richie, Ronald LaPread, Walter Orange, Milan Williams, Thomas McClary, William King
^{3} Jeffrey Hyman, John Cummings, Douglas Colvin, Thomas Erdelyi

A version of "Girl on Fire" remixed by Danny Lohner entitled (Resident Renholder Mix) was also later released on the Resident Evil: Apocalypse soundtrack.

=== DVD track listing ===
No.	Title	Length
1.	"Thunder Kiss '65"
2.	"More Human than Human"
3.	"Dragula"
4.	"Living Dead Girl"
5.	"Superbeast"
6.	"Never Gonna Stop (The Red Red Kroovy)"
7.	"Feel So Numb"
8.	"Demonoid Phenomenon" (previously unreleased)
9.	"Return of the Phantom Stranger" (previously unreleased)
10.	"Spookshow Baby" (previously unreleased)

== Chart positions ==
=== Album ===
Chart (2003)	Peak position
Australian Albums (ARIA)	88
Canadian Albums (Billboard)	17
UK Albums (OCC)	165
US Billboard 200	11
US Top Hard Rock Albums (Billboard)	25

=== Singles ===
Song	Chart (2003)	Peak position
"Two-Lane Blacktop"	Mainstream Rock Tracks	39

== Certifications ==
Certifications for Past, Present & Future
Region	Certification	Certified units/sales
Canada (Music Canada)	Gold	50,000^{^}
United Kingdom (BPI)	Silver	60,000^{‡}
United States (RIAA)	Platinum	1,000,000^{^}
^{^} Shipments figures based on certification alone.^{‡} Sales+streaming figures based on certification alone.
