= House of 1000 Corpses (soundtrack) =

Soundtrack album by Various Artists
- Released: March 25, 2003
- Genre: Soundtrack, heavy metal, country
- Length: 45:09
- Label: Geffen
- Producer: Scott Humphrey; Rob Zombie

Professional ratings
Review scores
Source	Rating
Allmusic	3/5 stars

House of 1000 Corpses is the soundtrack album for the movie House of 1000 Corpses, directed by Rob Zombie. It includes artists such as Buck Owens, Helen Kane, The Ramones, Lionel Richie, Slim Whitman, Trina, Scott Humphrey and Zombie himself, along with numerous instrumentals and audio samples taken from the movie.

== Track listing ==
1. "Howdy Folks" – 0:31
2. "House of 1000 Corpses" (Rob Zombie) – 3:43
3. "Saddle Up the Mule" – 0:17
4. "Everybody Scream" (Theme from Dr. Wolfenstein's Creature Double Feature Show) (Rob Zombie) – 2:36
5. "Stuck in the Mud" – 1:16
6. "Holy Miss Moley" – 0:16
7. "Who's Gonna Mow Your Grass?" (Buck Owens) – 2:19
8. "Run, Rabbit, Run" (Rob Zombie) – 3:01
9. "Into the Pit" – 1:21
10. "Something for You Men" – 0:20
11. "I Wanna Be Loved by You" (Helen Kane) – 2:47
12. "Pussy Liquor" (Rob Zombie) – 4:57
13. "Scarecrow Attack" – 2:12
14. "My Baby Boy" – 0:14
15. "Now I Wanna Sniff Some Glue" (The Ramones) – 1:34
16. "Investigation and the Smokehouse" – 0:35
17. "Bigger the Cushion" – 2:26
18. "I Remember You" (Slim Whitman) – 2:03
19. "Drive Out the Rabbit" – 0:13
20. "Mary's Escape" – 1:19
21. "Little Piggy" (Rob Zombie) – 3:54
22. "Ain't the Only Thing Tasty" – 0:26
23. "Dr. Satan" – 0:19
24. "Brick House 2003" (Rob Zombie featuring Lionel Richie and Trina) – 3:48
25. "To the House" – 2:29

== Chart positions ==
Album - Billboard (North America)

Year	Chart	Position
2003	The Billboard 200	53
2003	Top Soundtracks	4

== See also ==
- Rob Zombie discography
