= Mission: Impossible 2 (soundtrack) =

Music from and Inspired by Mission: Impossible 2

Soundtrack album by Various artists
- Released: May 9, 2000
- Genres: Nu metal; alternative metal; alternative rock; hard rock
- Length: 63:14
- Label: Hollywood

Singles from Music from and Inspired by Mission: Impossible 2
- 1. "I Disappear" Released: May 9, 2000; 2. "Take a Look Around" Released: July 31, 2000; 3. "Scum of the Earth" Released: 2000

Professional ratings
Review scores
| Source | Rating |
|---|---|
| Allmusic | 3/5 stars |

Music from and Inspired by Mission: Impossible 2 is the soundtrack album for the 2000 film Mission: Impossible 2. It was certified gold in Austria, Germany, Japan and New Zealand; silver in the United Kingdom; Platinum in the United States, and 2× Platinum in both Australia and Canada.

== Track listing ==
| No. | Title | Writer(s) | Producer(s) | Length |
|---|---|---|---|---|
| 1. | "Take a Look Around" (Limp Bizkit) | Lalo Schifrin; Fred Durst | Limp Bizkit | 5:19 |
| 2. | "I Disappear" (Metallica) | James Hetfield; Lars Ulrich | Bob Rock; Hetfield (co.); Ulrich (co.) | 4:26 |
| 3. | "Scum of the Earth" (Rob Zombie) | Rob Zombie; Scott Humphrey | Humphrey; Zombie | 2:55 |
| 4. | "They Came In" (Butthole Surfers) | Butthole Surfers | Butthole Surfers | 4:41 |
| 5. | "Rocket Science" (The Pimps) | Stuart Johnson; Anthony Crisman; Dave DeRosso | The Pimps; Jimmy Johnson | 3:30 |
| 6. | "Have a Cigar" (Foo Fighters and Brian May) | Roger Waters | Foo Fighters; Brian May; Justin Shirley-Smith | 4:02 |
| 7. | "Mission 2000" (Chris Cornell) | Alain Johannes; Natasha Shneider; Chris Cornell | Johannes; Shneider; Cornell | 3:42 |
| 8. | "Going Down" (Godsmack) | Sully Erna; Tony Rombola; Robbie Merrill | Erna | 3:23 |
| 9. | "What U Lookin' At?" (Uncle Kracker) | Matt Shafer; Robert James Ritchie | Kid Rock | 5:10 |
| 10. | "Backwards" (Apartment 26) | Apartment 26 | Ulrich Wild; Apartment 26 (co.) | 3:09 |
| 11. | "Karma" (Diffuser) | Tomas Costanza | Don Gilmore; Diffuser | 3:16 |
| 12. | "Alone" (Buckcherry) | Buckcherry; Hans Zimmer | Buckcherry; Joe Barresi | 3:23 |
| 13. | "Immune" (Tinfed) | Tinfed | Ed Buller | 3:49 |
| 14. | "Not My Kinda Scene" (Powderfinger) | Powderfinger | Powderfinger | 4:26 |
| 15. | "Carnival" (Tori Amos) | Luiz Bonfá; Hugo Peretti; Luigi Creatore; George David Weiss | Tori Amos | 4:16 |
| 16. | "Nyah" (Hans Zimmer featuring Heitor Pereira) | Zimmer | Zimmer | 3:33 |

Many versions of the soundtrack include additional songs that are not available on the North American releases. For example:

- The UK version includes the song "Iko-Iko" from Zap Mama.
- The Japan version includes 2 extra songs: "S.O.S" by Oblivion Dust and "Iko-Iko" from Zap Mama.
- The Australia version includes 3 extra songs: 17) Zap Mama – "Iko Iko"; 18) 28 Days – "Sucker"; 19) Josh Abrahams – "Theme From Mission Impossible".
- The Latin American version includes 2 extra songs, including "Deslizándote" by Saúl Hernández.
- The Brazilian version includes 1 extra song: "Give my Bullet Back" by Raimundos.
- The Asian version includes 2 extra songs: "Iko-Iko" by Zap Mama and "Afraid of What?" by Leon Lai, which contains a mixture of English and Mandarin.

== Court case ==
The illegal online availability of a demo of the song "I Disappear" prior to the release of the soundtrack led to the 2000 U.S. district court case Metallica v. Napster, Inc.

== Charts ==
=== Weekly charts ===
Weekly chart performance for Music from and Inspired by Mission: Impossible 2
| Chart (2000) | Peak position |
|---|---|
| Australian Albums (ARIA) | 3 |
| Austrian Albums (Ö3 Austria) | 3 |
| Belgian Albums (Ultratop Flanders) | 18 |
| Belgian Albums (Ultratop Wallonia) | 14 |
| Canada Top Albums/CDs (RPM) | 1 |
| Dutch Albums (Album Top 100) | 32 |
| Finnish Albums (Suomen virallinen lista) | 6 |
| French Albums (SNEP) | 14 |
| German Albums (Offizielle Top 100) | 3 |
| Hungarian Albums (MAHASZ) | 14 |
| New Zealand Albums (RMNZ) | 6 |
| Norwegian Albums (VG-lista) | 14 |
| Swedish Albums (Sverigetopplistan) | 26 |
| Swiss Albums (Schweizer Hitparade) | 6 |
| UK Compilation Albums (Official Charts) | 12 |
| US Billboard 200 | 2 |

=== Year-end charts ===
Year-end chart performance for Music from and Inspired by Mission: Impossible 2
| Chart (2000) | Position |
|---|---|
| Australian Albums (ARIA) | 33 |
| Austrian Albums (Ö3 Austria) | 10 |
| Belgian Albums (Ultratop Wallonia) | 93 |
| Canadian Albums (Nielsen SoundScan) | 26 |
| European Albums (Music & Media) | 48 |
| German Albums (Offizielle Top 100) | 48 |
| New Zealand Albums (RMNZ) | 45 |
| Swiss Albums (Schweizer Hitparade) | 69 |
| US Billboard 200 | 59 |

== Certifications and sales ==
Certifications and sales for Music from and Inspired by Mission: Impossible 2
| Region | Certification | Certified units/sales |
|---|---|---|
| Australia (ARIA) | 2× Platinum | 140,000^{^} |
| Austria (IFPI Austria) | Gold | 25,000^{*} |
| Canada (Music Canada) | 2× Platinum | 200,000^{^} |
| Germany (BVMI) | Gold | 150,000^{^} |
| Japan (RIAJ) | Gold | 100,000^{^} |
| New Zealand (RMNZ) | Gold | 7,500^{^} |
| United Kingdom (BPI) | Silver | 60,000^{^} |
| United States (RIAA) | Platinum | 1,000,000^{^} / 1,440,000 |
^{*} Sales figures based on certification alone.^{^} Shipments figures based on certification alone.
