= Rob Zombie's unrealized projects =

During his career, American film director and musician Rob Zombie has worked on a number of projects which never progressed beyond the pre-production stage under his direction. Some of these productions fell in development hell or were cancelled.

== 1990s ==
=== The Crow: 2037 ===
In 1997, it was reported that Zombie was to write and make his feature directorial debut with The Crow: 2037, which was intended to be the third film of The Crow (1994). White Zombie covered the KC and the Sunshine Band hit "I'm Your Boogie Man" for the soundtrack of The Crow: City of Angels, and after seeing Rob Zombie's work on the video he produced for the song, Edward Pressman offered Zombie the opportunity to helm the third Crow film. Had the film been made, Zombie planned to shift focus in tone from the revenge angle of the previous two entries, to a more horror-based approach. The film would've began in 2010, when a young boy and his mother are murdered on Halloween night by a Satanic priest. A year later, the boy is resurrected as the Crow. 27 years later, unaware of his past, he has become a bounty hunter on a collision course with his now all-powerful killer. While producers responded favorably to Zombie's proposal for a third "The Crow" film, producers Pressman and Most ultimately decided it wasn't the best fit for a Crow film and was better served as a standalone work. Zombie later described his frustration with the 18-month experience; the producers' indecisiveness eventually drove him to leave the project.

== 2000s ==
=== Tyrannosaurus Rex/T-Rex ===
In 2008, it was reported that Zombie was to direct a film for Dimension Films titled either Tyrannosaurus Rex or T-Rex. It was believed that the project was to have been based on Steve Niles and Zombie's 2004 comic book The Nail, but Zombie denied this. According to The Oklahoman, the film was to have been about "a washed-up boxer who gets into the world of underground fighting after he’s released from prison." Zombie also described it as a crossover between Straight Time (1978) and Raging Bull (1980). Zombie said in a 2011 interview with Entertainment Weekly that Tyrannosaurus Rex was to have been his next feature after Halloween (2007). When asked about the status of the project in a 2010 interview, Zombie said, "It’s nowhere. I mean it’s not in any kind of production whatsoever." According to Bloody Disgusting, the film was never made because The Weinstein Company thought it was too expensive.

=== The Blob remake ===
In 2009, it was announced that Zombie would write, produce and direct a second remake of the 1958 film The Blob.Variety reported in August 2009 that Zombie had started writing the screenplay. Zombie's version was said to have been budgeted $30 million. Zombie said of the project: "The Blob was going to happen. I was dealing with people on the movie, even though I was on the fence about doing anything that was considered a remake again. I really didn’t like the idea of that, but just as I went down the road further with the producers and the guys that owned the property, I didn’t feel good about the situation and I just walked away from it. My gut told me this was not a good place to be." It was said that Zombie's version was scrapped and that Simon West replaced him for the director's chair in 2015. In 2018, concept art related to what would have been Zombie's version of The Blob was publicly released.

== 2010s ==
=== The Broad Street Bullies ===
In 2012, it was announced that Zombie was to have written, produced and directed a 1970s-set film about the Philadelphia Flyers titled The Broad Street Bullies. In 2014, it was announced that Zombie shelved the project. Zombie said of the project in a 2015 interview: "The problem is when you don't control the material. When it's an original story that I wrote I can control everything. I don't have to answer to anybody. But something like the Philadelphia Flyers, Broad Street Bullies, something that's a true story pre-existing thing there's so much more protocol you have to go through of getting people to ok things and different steps that just really slow down the process."

=== Manson Family Miniseries ===
In 2014, it was announced that Rob Zombie and American Psycho author, Bret Easton Ellis, teamed up with Alcon Entertainment to make a miniseries centered around The Manson Family. The miniseries would aim to tell converging stories of people and events leading up to and after the murders, from shifting points of view.

=== Raised Eyebrows ===
In 2015, it was announced that Zombie was to direct and produce a biopic on Groucho Marx. The film was to have been based on Steve Stoliar's 1996 book Raised Eyebrows: My Years Inside Groucho's House. Zombie reportedly acquired the rights to the book. Oren Moverman subsequently wrote the screenplay, before replacing Zombie as director by February 2022.

=== Trapped ===
In 2015, Starz announced a new horror-comedy TV series called Trapped. Mila Kunis and Rob Zombie would serve as executive producers, with Zombie also directing. It would take place over a single night in the home of a wealthy family under attack by a murderous cult.
