= The Sinister Urge (album) =

Studio album by Rob Zombie
- Released: November 13, 2001
- Recorded: Chop Shop (Hollywood, California)
- Genre: Industrial metal
- Length: 39:31
- Label: Geffen
- Producers: Rob Zombie; Scott Humphrey

Rob Zombie chronology
American Made Music to Strip By (1999)	The Sinister Urge (2001)	Past, Present & Future (2003)

Singles from The Sinister Urge
- 1. "Feel So Numb" Released: October 14, 2001; 2. "Demon Speeding" Released: July 1, 2002

Audio
- "Album" playlist on YouTube

Professional ratings
Review scores
Source	Rating
AllMusic	4/5 stars
The A.V. Club	(positive)
Blender	3/5 stars
Brave Words & Bloody Knuckles	7/10
Collector's Guide to Heavy Metal	4/10
Drowned in Sound	(mixed)
The Encyclopedia of Popular Music	3/5 stars
Legends	(mixed)
Metal Storm	9.5/10
The Rolling Stone Album Guide	3/5 stars

The Sinister Urge is the second solo studio album by American musician Rob Zombie. The album is the follow-up to his highly successful debut album Hellbilly Deluxe, released in 1998. The album was released by Geffen Records on November 13, 2001, more than three years after the release of his first album. The album's title is named after the 1960 crime drama film The Sinister Urge, directed and written by Ed Wood. Much like his previous effort, The Sinister Urge features elements of horror film and suspense in both its lyrical content and its music. Zombie also features a change of sound in several songs on the album when compared to Hellbilly, with songs such as "Never Gonna Stop (The Red, Red Kroovy)" featuring a more dance-influenced beat.

The album only spawned one commercial single, "Demon Speeding", which was released in June 2002. The song was a hit on the Billboard Hot Mainstream Rock Tracks chart in the United States, becoming Zombie's third Top 20 hit on the chart. Several songs from the album were released as promotional singles both before and after the album's release. The song "Scum of the Earth" was featured on the Mission: Impossible 2 soundtrack, while "Never Gonna Stop (The Red, Red Kroovy)", "Feel So Numb" and "Dead Girl Superstar" were released as promotional singles throughout 2001 and 2002. The album itself was a commercial success, becoming Zombie's second consecutive studio album to enter inside the Top 10 of the Billboard 200. The album went on to receive a Platinum certification from the RIAA, for shipments exceeding one million copies.

The Sinister Urge received mixed to positive critical reviews, but has become a fan favorite. Songs from the album were used in numerous television series and films, similar to the success of Zombie's previous album. Songs from the album have been covered by numerous artists, with some of these covers appearing on the 2002 tribute album The Electro-Industrial Tribute to Rob Zombie. To date, The Sinister Urge has sold nearly two million copies worldwide, and was his second RIAA-certified album. The Sinister Urge is one of three Rob Zombie albums to reach Platinum status, along with Hellbilly Deluxe and the 2003 compilation album Past, Present & Future. It is the final album to include and drummer John Tempesta, who had been part of the Rob Zombie band line-up since 1998, as well as guitarist Mike Riggs until 2026's The Great Satan.

== Background & development ==
On The Sinister Urge, Zombie worked with numerous writers and producers from his previous album, Hellbilly Deluxe. Scott Humphrey returned to produce the album, while former White Zombie band member John Tempesta returned to play drums for the album. On the concept behind the album, Zombie stated "I didn't really have a theme, I used to think that way but now I try not to have a preconceived idea because then you sort of box yourself into a corner and then everything doesn't fit. You actually end up throwing away better songs because you think it has to be a certain way." Zombie worked with music legend and Black Sabbath singer Ozzy Osbourne on the song "Iron Head", featured as the fifth track on the album. On the collaboration, Zombie stated "I thought that somehow the song didn't seem special enough. Somehow I thought that the song wasn't as good as it should be and I had been talking to Ozzy a lot and working on stuff for the tour and someone was like, 'Why don't you just get Ozzy to fucking do it?' It was like, duh. Sometimes you don't think of the obvious ideas." Kerry King of thrash metal band Slayer provides a guitar solo for the song "Dead Girl Superstar".

== Composition ==
Zombie stated that his previous album, Hellbilly Deluxe, featured a lot of electronics, whereas The Sinister Urge features a live band, meaning more emphasis on the instrumentals. "Never Gonna Stop (The Red, Red Kroovy)" is said to "showcase handclaps and acoustic guitars". The song's video is inspired by the film A Clockwork Orange.

== Release and artwork ==
The Sinister Urge was released on November 13, 2001 via Geffen Records. The album cover features Zombie with a green tint around him with a light blue background. The cover for the explicit version of the album features a skull and crossbones not found on the clean edition. The album sold just below 150,000 copies in its first week to debut at number 8 on the Billboard 200 chart.

== Legacy ==
In 2012, it was voted as the fan-favorite album, with Hellbilly Deluxe coming in second place.

== Track listing ==
All lyrics are written by Rob Zombie; all music is composed by Rob Zombie and Scott Humphrey, except "Iron Head" by Rob Zombie, Mike Riggs and Scott Humphrey.

No.	Title	Length
1.	"Sinners Inc."	1:17
2.	"Demon Speeding"	3:44
3.	"Dead Girl Superstar" (featuring Kerry King)	2:28
4.	"Never Gonna Stop (The Red, Red Kroovy)"	3:09
5.	"Iron Head" (featuring Ozzy Osbourne)	4:10
6.	"(Go To) California"	3:25
7.	"Feel So Numb"	3:53
8.	"Transylvanian Transmissions Pt. 1"	1:09
9.	"Bring Her Down (To Crippletown)"	3:59
10.	"Scum of the Earth"	2:55
11.	"House of 1000 Corpses" (Contains hidden song "Unholy Three")	9:26
Total length:		39:31

== Personnel ==
Music

- Rob Zombie – vocals
- Riggs – guitars
- Blasko – bass
- Tempesta – drums
- Emm Gryner – female vocals
- Evelyne Bennu – female vocals
- Ozzy Osbourne – additional vocals on "Iron Head"
- Phil X – additional guitars
- Danny Lohner – additional guitars
- Kerry King – additional guitars on "Dead Girl Superstar"
- Chris Chaney – additional bass
- Josh Freese – additional drums
- Tommy Lee – additional drums
- Gary Novak – additional drums
- Bennett Salvay – string arrangements
- Jerry Hey – horns
- Bill Reichenbach Jr. – horns
- Daniel Wiggins – horns
- Gary Grant – horns
- DJ Lethal – turntables
- Mix Master Mike – turntables

Production

- Rob Zombie – production, lyrics, art direction, photos, package design
- Scott Humphrey – production, programming, mixing, additional guitars
- Frank Gryner – engineering, mixing, additional guitars
- Tom Baker – mastering
- Dan Burns – assistant engineering
- Marina Chavez – photos

== Charts ==
=== Weekly charts ===
Weekly chart performance for The Sinister Urge
Chart (2001–02)	Peak position
Australian Albums (ARIA)	46
Finnish Albums (Suomen virallinen lista)	38
UK Albums (OCC)	108
US Billboard 200	8

=== Year-end charts ===
2001 year-end chart performance for The Sinister Urge
Chart (2001)	Position
Canadian Albums (Nielsen SoundScan)	194

2002 year-end chart performance for The Sinister Urge
Chart (2002)	Position
Canadian Alternative Albums (Nielsen SoundScan)	117
Canadian Metal Albums (Nielsen SoundScan)	55
US Billboard 200	85

== Certifications ==
Certifications for The Sinister Urge
Region	Certification	Certified units/sales
Canada (Music Canada)	Gold	50,000^{^}
United States (RIAA)	Platinum	1,000,000^{^}
^{^} Shipments figures based on certification alone.
