= Hands of Death (Burn Baby Burn) =

Song by Rob Zombie and Alice Cooper

from the album Songs in the Key of X: Music from and Inspired by The X-Files
- Released: March 26, 1996
- Recorded: 1995 at NRG Studios, Los Angeles
- Length: 4:13
- Label: Warner Bros. Records
- Songwriters: Rob Zombie; Charlie Clouser; Alice Cooper
- Producers: Charlie Clouser; Terry Date; Rob Zombie

"Hands of Death (Burn Baby Burn)" is a song created and sung by Rob Zombie and Alice Cooper which can be found on the Songs in the Key of X: Music from and Inspired by The X-Files compilation album for music featured in or inspired by the popular TV series The X-Files. Rob Zombie described his collaboration with Alice Cooper on the song as one of the "great moments where you really feel like you've made your dreams come true". Zombie and Cooper were nominated for the Grammy Award for Best Metal Performance in 1997 for the song, losing out to Rage Against the Machine's "Tire Me".

The song is also featured on Rob Zombie's album Past, Present & Future and once again as a remixed version on Alice Cooper's The Life and Crimes box set.

At approximately 2:40 in the song is an audio clip from the film Rosemary's Baby.

== Personnel ==
=== Rob Zombie ===
- Rob Zombie - vocals, all instruments

=== Guest musician ===
- Alice Cooper - guest vocals

=== Production ===
- Charlie Clouser - production, engineering
- Terry Date - production, engineering
- Rob Zombie - production, engineering, lyrics
