= The Lords of Salem (song) =

2006 song by Rob Zombie

Song by Rob Zombie

from the album Educated Horses
- Released: March 28, 2006
- Recorded: 2006
- Studio: The Chop Shop (Hollywood, California)
- Genre: Heavy metal
- Length: 4:13
- Label: Geffen
- Songwriters: Rob Zombie; John 5; Scott Humphrey
- Producers: Scott Humphrey; Rob Zombie

"The Lords of Salem" is the eleventh and final track on Rob Zombie's third studio album, Educated Horses (2006). It is also included on Zombie's greatest hits album The Best of Rob Zombie, Zombie's live album Zombie Live, and the soundtrack for The Covenant.

The song is based on the Salem witchcraft trials of the 17th century. An animated music video, much similar to that of "American Witch", was made in 2006.

== Reception ==
Although no single was released and it did not chart, the song was nominated for a Grammy Award for Best Hard Rock Performance for the 2009 Grammy Awards. The live version heard on Zombie Live was the nominated track. Zombie later directed a film titled The Lords of Salem which is unrelated to the song.

== Personnel ==
=== Rob Zombie ===
- Rob Zombie - lead vocals
- John 5 - guitar, backing vocals
- Blasko - bass, backing vocals
- Tommy Clufetos - drums, backing vocals

=== Production ===
- Tom Baker - mastering
- Chris Baseford - engineering
- Scott Humphrey - production
- Will Thompson - assistant engineering
- Rob Zombie - lyrics, production
