= The Great Satan (Rob Zombie album) =

Studio album by Rob Zombie
- Released: February 27, 2026
- Genres: Industrial metal; groove metal
- Length: 38:33
- Label: Nuclear Blast
- Producer: Zeuss

Rob Zombie chronology
The Lunar Injection Kool Aid Eclipse Conspiracy (2021)	The Great Satan (2026)

Singles from The Great Satan
- 1. "Punks and Demons" Released: October 10, 2025; 2. "Heathen Days" Released: November 21, 2025; 3. "(I'm a) Rock 'N' Roller" Released: January 23, 2026

The Great Satan is the eighth solo studio album by the American heavy metal musician Rob Zombie, released on February 27, 2026 by Nuclear Blast. The album marks Zombie's first since The Sinister Urge to feature guitarist Riggs, the first since Educated Horses to feature bassist Blasko, and the last to feature drummer Ginger Fish before his departure in 2026.

Three singles have been released from the album: "Punks and Demons", which has a music video directed by Zombie himself, "Heathen Days", and "(I'm a) Rock 'N' Roller".

== Composition ==
According to a press release, the album shows Rob Zombie "revisiting his early Hellbilly roots for a slaughterhouse of anthemic punk infused heavy rock/metal". Upon its release, critics described The Great Satan as industrial metal and groove metal. It also has elements of thrash metal and punk rock, while harkening back to horror and sci-fi aesthetics of his early solo albums.

== Release ==
The Great Satan was released on February 27, 2026, by Nuclear Blast. "Punks and Demons", the album's lead single was released on October 10, 2025 to critical praise, with Greg Kennelty of Metal Injection calling it an "unrelenting hellscape with loads of crunchy riffs." The second single, "Heathen Days" was released on November 21, and was described by Gregory Adams of Revolver as "hurtl[ing] at you with fuel-injected fury, pedal-to-the-metal guitar slides, weird synth-phonics and Zombie's incomparable vocal style".

== Critical reception ==
Professional ratings
Aggregate scores
Source	Rating
Metacritic	74/100
Review scores
Source	Rating
AllMusic	4/5 stars
Blabbermouth.net	8.5/10
Classic Rock	4/5 stars
Distorted Sound	7/10
Kerrang!	4/5
Metal Hammer	7/10 stars
Pitchfork	5.4/10
Spectrum Culture	3.25/5 stars
Sputnikmusic	4/5 stars

According to the review aggregator Metacritic, The Great Satan received "generally favorable reviews" based on a weighted average score of 74 out of 100 from 5 critic scores.

Dom Lawson of Blabbermouth.net stated that The Great Satan "is a rock 'n' roll record belched from the swirling depths of one unusually creative man's imagination: And it rocks like an absolute motherfucker." He noted that it "offers a fresh take on the same thrillingly perverse ingredients", and concluding that, "On this evidence, he seems to be picking up steam again." Neil Z. Yeung of AllMusic wrote that "Sticking to what he knows best, Rob Zombie delivers another punishing -- but a hell of a fun time! -- collection of "Hellbilly" insanity", noting that "The Great Satan absolutely rips, with the jagged riffs, wild audio samples, and jackhammer drumming (courtesy of Ginger Fish) supporting some of Zombie's best (and most rabid) vocals in many an album," He concludes that "It's really nice to hear that the old ghoul has still got it."

== Track listing ==
All lyrics are written by Rob Zombie; all music is composed by Rob Zombie, except "F.T.W. 84, "Tarantula", and "Black Rat Coffin" (composed by Zombie, Riggs, and Zeuss).

The Great Satan track listing
No.	Title	Length
1.	"F.T.W. 84"	3:55
2.	"Tarantula"	3:02
3.	"(I'm a) Rock 'N' Roller"	3:32
4.	"Heathen Days"	2:17
5.	"Who Am I?"	0:34
6.	"Black Rat Coffin"	3:04
7.	"Sir Lord Acid Wolfman"	3:45
8.	"Punks and Demons"	2:38
9.	"The Devilman"	3:26
10.	"Out of Sight"	2:47
11.	"Revolution Motherfuckers"	2:33
12.	"Welcome to the Electric Age"	0:54
13.	"The Black Scorpion"	1:33
14.	"Unclean Animals"	3:33
15.	"Grave Discontent"	1:00
Total length:		38:40

== Personnel ==
Credits are adapted from the album's liner notes.

=== Rob Zombie ===
- Rob Zombie – vocals
- Mike Riggs – guitars
- Blasko – bass
- Ginger Fish – drums

=== Production ===
- Zeuss – production, engineering, mixing
- Rob Zombie – art direction, design, illustrations
- Ryan Goff – additional drums
- Keys Mahoney – keyboards
- Rob Fenn – photography

== Charts ==
Chart performance for The Great Satan
Chart (2026)	Peak position
Australian Albums (ARIA)	29
Austrian Albums (Ö3 Austria)	6
Belgian Albums (Ultratop Flanders)	104
Belgian Albums (Ultratop Wallonia)	25
French Albums (SNEP)	152
French Rock & Metal Albums (SNEP)	8
German Albums (Offizielle Top 100)	15
Japanese Download Albums (Billboard Japan)	57
Scottish Albums (Official Charts)	16
Swedish Physical Albums (Sverigetopplistan)	19
Swiss Albums (Schweizer Hitparade)	18
UK Albums (Official Charts)	81
UK Independent Albums (Official Charts)	5
UK Rock & Metal Albums (Official Charts)	1
US Billboard 200	54
US Independent Albums (Billboard)	16
US Top Rock & Alternative Albums (Billboard)	13
