= Dead City Radio and the New Gods of Supertown =

Single by Rob Zombie

from the album Venomous Rat Regeneration Vendor
- Released: February 23, 2013
- Genre: Industrial metal; groove metal; acid rock
- Length: 3:28
- Label: Zodiac Swan Records / T-Boy Records / Universal Music Enterprises
- Songwriters: Rob Zombie; John 5 Bob Marlette
- Producer: Bob Marlette

Rob Zombie singles chronology
"Sick Bubblegum" (2010)	"Dead City Radio and the New Gods of Supertown" (2013)

Dead City Radio and the New Gods of Supertown is the first single from Venomous Rat Regeneration Vendor, the fifth studio album by recording artist Rob Zombie. The song was released on February 23, 2013.

== Premise ==
The song laments the state of rock radio as it currently stands.

== Music video ==
The video features a breakdancing skeleton along with performance by Zombie's wife Sheri Moon Zombie. Zombie stated that as the interest in videos slowly diminished over the past decade, that he got bored with making music videos. However, because the band was excited about Mayhem Festival and the album, that they decided to go all out to make an excellent video. It's the first music video to feature John 5 wearing face paint.

== Chart positions ==
Chart (2013)	Peak Position
Mainstream Rock Tracks	15
