= Feel So Numb =

Single by Rob Zombie

from the album The Sinister Urge
- Released: October 14, 2001
- Recorded: 2001
- Studio: Chop Shop, Hollywood, California
- Genre: Industrial metal
- Length: 3:54
- Label: Geffen
- Songwriters: Rob Zombie; Scott Humphrey
- Producers: Rob Zombie; Scott Humphrey

Rob Zombie singles chronology
| "Superbeast" (1999) | "Feel So Numb" (2001) | "Never Gonna Stop (The Red Red Kroovy)" (2001) |

Music video
- "Feel So Numb" on YouTube

"Feel So Numb" is a song recorded by American musician and film director Rob Zombie for his second studio album, The Sinister Urge (2001). The song was released through Geffen Records on October 14, 2001 as the lead single from the album. The Spanish intro sample "Prometo solemnemente defender el bien y luchar contra la injusticia y la maldad" translates as "I solemnly promise to defend good and fight against injustice and evil". This is taken from a 1968 Mexican movie calls "Los Canallas", starring by The Hall of Fame's luchador Mil Máscaras. The laughing at the beginning of the song is taken from the movie Horror Rises from the Tomb, The sound right after the laughing is from the movie I Drink Your Blood. Linda Miles of WWE used the song as an entrance theme for a short time in 2002, and it served as the theme song for WWE's No Way Out pay-per-view. The song also made an appearance on the Rollerball soundtrack and the 2006 video game FlatOut 2, along with the 2002 video game NHL Hitz 20-03.

== Music video ==
The music video features the band playing in a club like place with various clips of "monsters". Sid Haig, Bill Moseley and Sheri Moon also appear briefly in the video.

== Personnel ==
=== Rob Zombie ===
- Rob Zombie - vocals
- Riggs - guitar
- Blasko - bass
- Tempesta - drums

=== Production ===
- Tom Baker - mastering
- Scott Humphrey - production, programming, mixing
- Rob Zombie - production, lyrics, music, art direction

== Chart positions ==
| Chart (2001) | Peak position |
|---|---|
| U.S. Billboard Hot Mainstream Rock Tracks | 10 |
| U.S. Billboard Hot Modern Rock Tracks | 18 |
