= Educated Horses =

Studio album by Rob Zombie
- Released: March 28, 2006
- Recorded: 2005 at The Chop Shop in Hollywood, California
- Genres: Alternative metal, hard rock, industrial metal
- Length: 38:25
- Label: Geffen
- Producers: Scott Humphrey; Rob Zombie

Rob Zombie chronology
Past, Present & Future (2003)	Educated Horses (2006)	The Best of Rob Zombie (2006)

Singles from Educated Horses
- 1. "Foxy Foxy" Released: February 14, 2006; 2. "American Witch" Released: 2006; 3. "Let It All Bleed Out" Released: 2006

Educated Horses is the third studio album by American musician Rob Zombie, released on March 28, 2006, by Geffen. A streaming "listening party" was held on MP3.com starting March 22, 2006, which caused advance copies to spread throughout P2P software programs. It is the first Rob Zombie album to feature guitarist John 5 and drummer Tommy Clufetos, and the last to feature bassist Blasko until 2026's The Great Satan.

In response to questions about what the album's title means, Rob Zombie said:

"It was a weird kind of phrase, like, that I remembered as something as a kid. You know, my parents, my grandparents, my aunts and uncles, the whole family, were involved in carnival business and, like, circus business, so as a kid, we would get dragged to these things, and we'd have to spend all this time there. And that was just one of the attractions I remember, what they would call the trained animals, you know, educated horses."

== Production ==
Educated Horses can be described as Zombie's most experimental album to date. Writing for Rob Zombie for the first time, John 5 experimented with a number of acoustics, which can be heard on tracks such as "Sawdust in the Blood" and "Death of It All". Yet the album still contains his signature horror tastes. "17 Year Locust" and "The Scorpion Sleeps" were both written about creepy-crawlies.

Rob Zombie has stated that the album had influences from glam rock artists like Slade, T. Rex, and Gary Glitter.

== Reception ==
Professional ratings
Review scores
Source	Rating
AllMusic	3.5/5 stars
Blabbermouth.net	7/10
Collector's Guide to Heavy Metal	4/10
The Encyclopedia of Popular Music	3/5 stars
Entertainment Weekly	C+
IGN	7.2/10
Rolling Stone	3/5 stars
Slant Magazine	3.5/5 stars

The album debuted at number five on the U.S. Billboard 200, Zombie's highest chart position since Hellbilly Deluxe, selling about 120,000 copies in its first week. It also debuted at number one on Billboard's Top Rock Albums chart. In its second week it dropped to number fourteen, selling a further 46,720 copies.

The song "The Lords of Salem" was nominated for the Grammy for Best Hard Rock Performance of 2008.

Christian Hoard of Rolling Stone magazine had this to say:

A handful of cuts are too long on sludgy instrumental grooves, but whether Zombie is out-Trent Reznoring Trent Reznor on the sitar-laden grindfest "17 Year Locust" or spitting fire amid the apocalyptic blues riffs of "The Devil's Rejects," he sounds like a gifted schlockmeister that Strokes fans can enjoy. Or at least tolerate.

== Music videos ==
Zombie directed music videos for "Foxy Foxy" and "American Witch". Artist and animator David Hartman created two animated music videos, for "American Witch" and "The Lords of Salem".

== Track listing ==
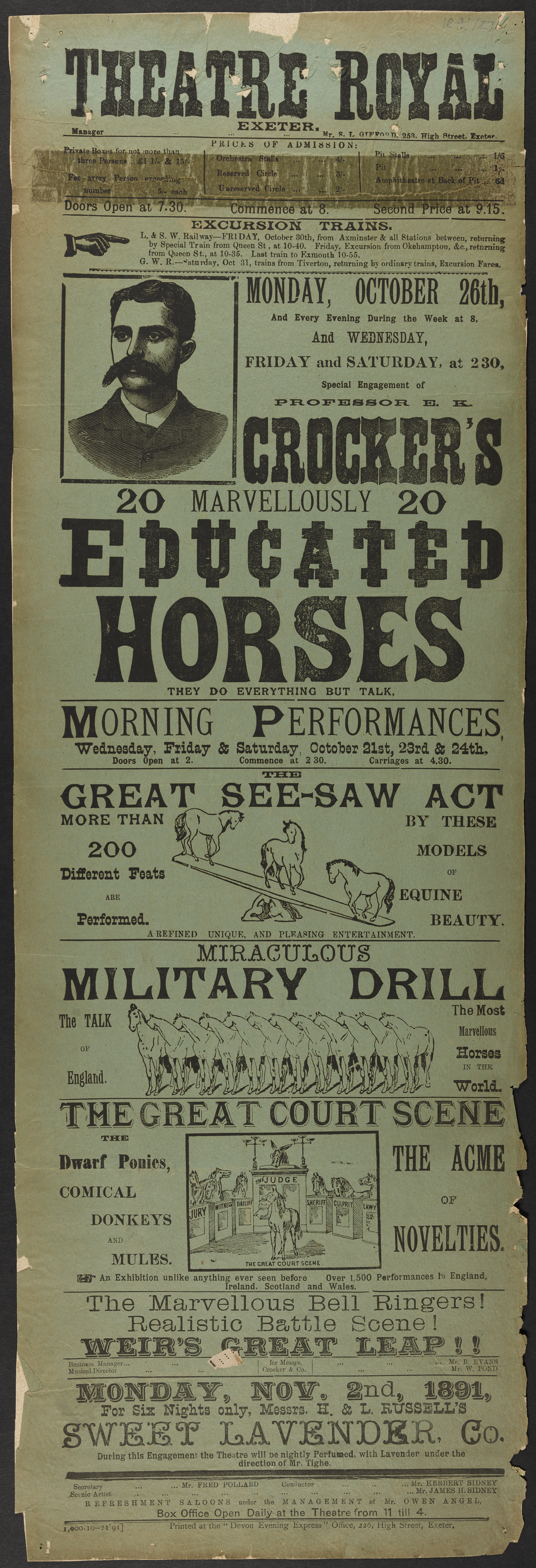
Playbill advertising performances by "Educated Horses" like the ones that Zombie says inspired the title of the album

All songs written by Rob Zombie, John 5 and Scott Humphrey unless otherwise noted.

No.	Title	Writer(s)	Length
1.	"Sawdust in the Blood"		1:22
2.	"American Witch"		3:47
3.	"Foxy Foxy"	Zombie, Humphrey	3:28
4.	"17 Year Locust"		4:06
5.	"The Scorpion Sleeps"		3:38
6.	"100 Ways"		1:53
7.	"Let It All Bleed Out"	Zombie, Humphrey	4:09
8.	"Death of It All"		4:22
9.	"Ride"		3:32
10.	"The Devil's Rejects"		3:54
11.	"The Lords of Salem"		4:13
Total length:			38:25

== Personnel ==
Musicians

- Rob Zombie – vocals, lyrics
- John 5 – guitars, additional bass, background vocals
- Blasko – bass, background vocals
- Tommy Clufetos – drums, background vocals
- Scott Humphrey – additional guitars, additional bass, background vocals
- Tommy Lee – additional drums
- Josh Freese – additional drums
- Audrey Wiechman – background vocals

Production

- Scott Humphrey – producer, mixing
- Rob Zombie – producer
- Tom Baker – mastering
- Chris Baseford – engineer
- Todd Harapiak – assistant engineer
- Will Thompson – assistant engineer
- Rob Zombie – art direction, package design, additional photos
- Kristin Burns – photos
- Drew Fitgerald – art direction

== Chart positions ==
Album

Chart (2006)	Peak position
Australian Albums (ARIA)	44
Canadian Albums (Billboard)	5
French Albums (SNEP)	184
Scottish Albums (Official Charts)	95
UK Albums (OCC)	90
US Billboard 200	5
US Top Hard Rock Albums (Billboard)	1
US Top Rock Albums (Billboard)	1

Singles

Song	Chart (2006)	Peak position
"Foxy Foxy"	Mainstream Rock Tracks	8
"Foxy Foxy"	Alternative Airplay	26
"American Witch"	Mainstream Rock Tracks	12
"American Witch"	Alternative Airplay	32
"Let It All Bleed Out"	Mainstream Rock Tracks	29
