= John Tempesta =

American drummer (born 1964)

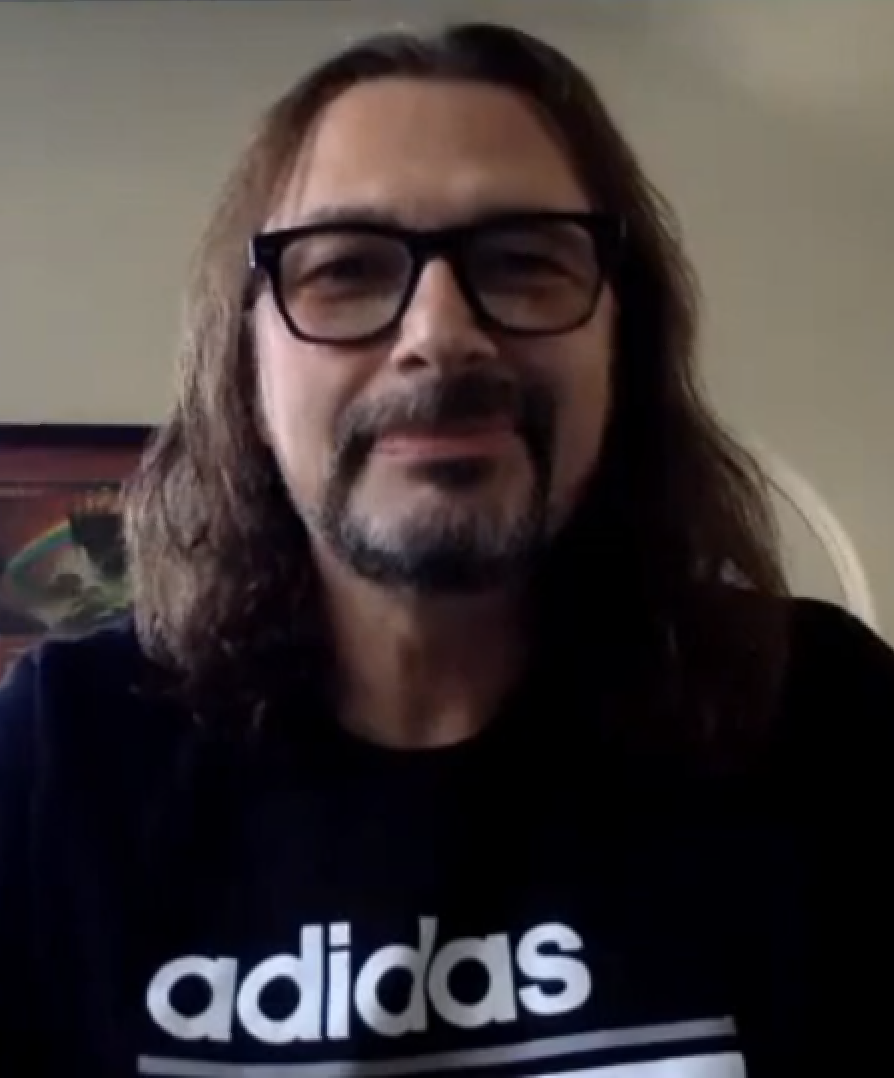
- Tempesta in 2021

Background information
- Born: September 26, 1964 (age 62); The Bronx, New York, U.S.
- Genres: Heavy metal; alternative metal; thrash metal; groove metal; alternative rock; hard rock
- Occupation: Drummer
- Years active: 1989–present
- Website: johntempesta.com

John Tempesta (born September 26, 1964) is an American drummer known for his work in numerous hard rock and heavy metal acts, including Exodus, Testament, White Zombie and frontman Rob Zombie's solo career, Helmet, the Cult and Scum of the Earth. He is the brother of guitarist Mike Tempesta, with whom he has also worked together in several projects.

== Biography ==
Previously, Tempesta played with several bands including Exodus, Testament and White Zombie. He worked with former White Zombie singer Rob Zombie as a solo artist and served as drum technician for Charlie Benante, drummer for the heavy metal band Anthrax, earlier in his career. He is referenced in Anthrax's rendition of "Friggin' in the Riggin'" (from their 1989 EP Penikufesin), with lyrics about the band's crew members. Additionally he also played the role of the "Not Man" during Anthrax's early live shows, footage of which can be seen in the "Antisocial" music video.

In 1997 he had a brief tenure as the drummer for the band Prong before they disbanded later the same year.

In 2000, he played drums on the song "Meat", from Tony Iommi's self-titled solo album.

He played with the band Helmet in 2004–2005.

In October 2004, he recorded with the band Scum of the Earth. The band was composed of John and his brother Mike Tempesta who was formerly the guitarist of Powerman 5000, Riggs (former Rob Zombie guitarist), John Dolmayan (System of a Down), Seven, and Clay Campbell. They released Blah...Blah...Blah...Love Songs for the New Millennium, a pop-heavy release reminiscent of the White Zombie / Rob Zombie sound, produced by Ben Burkhardt at Belt of Orion Recording in Hollywood.

In February 2006, Tempesta was hired by the Cult. He was in the band for 20 years until his departure in November 2026, spanning three albums and two EPs.

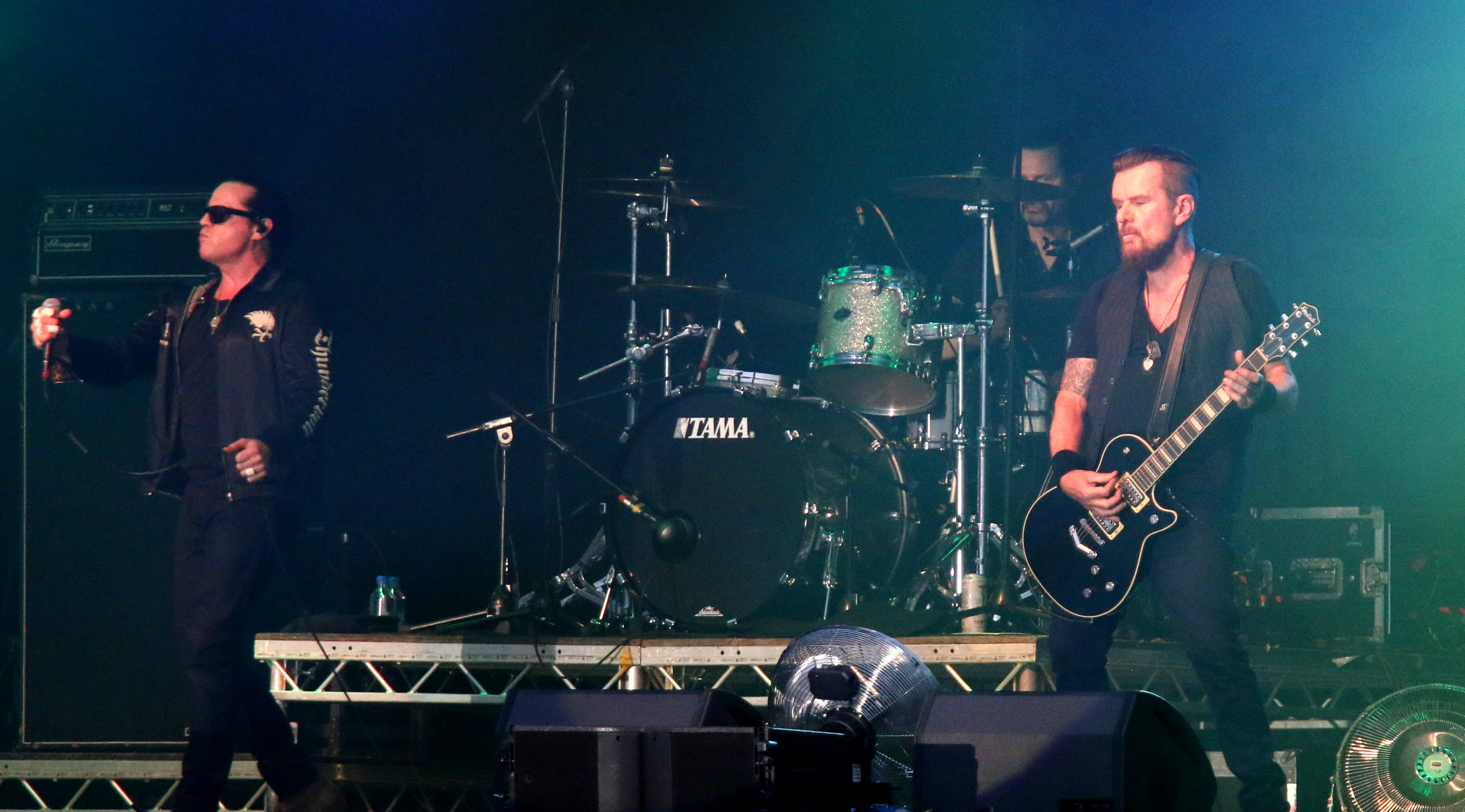
Tempesta (middle) performing with The Cult in 2011

In April 2011, he recorded drum samples and MIDI grooves for a Toontrack expansion to drum emulation software EZdrummer, called Metal Machine EZX.

July 15, 2013, Tempesta finished his drum recordings for the project Temple of the Black Moon, a project with well-known artists from a variety of metal genres. Other members are Dani Filth, Rob Caggiano and King Ov Hell. In the same year, he also drummed on Emphatic's album Another Life.

== Discography ==
=== With Exodus ===
- Impact is Imminent (1990)
- Good Friendly Violent Fun (1991)
- Force of Habit (1992)

=== With Testament ===
- Low (1994)
- First Strike Still Deadly (2001)
- Live in London (2005)

=== With White Zombie ===
- Astro Creep: 2000 (1995)

=== With Rob Zombie ===
- Hellbilly Deluxe (1998)
- Mission: Impossible 2 (soundtrack) (2000)
- The Sinister Urge (2001)

=== With Helmet ===
- Size Matters (2004)

=== With Scum of the Earth ===
- Blah...Blah...Blah...Love Songs for the New Millennium (2004)

=== With The Cult ===
- Born into This (2007)
- Capsule EPs (2010)
- Choice of Weapon (2012)
- Hidden City (2016)

=== With Emphatic ===
- Another Life (2013)
