= Mike Riggs =

American musician

RiG̈G̈S
- Born: April 23, 1971 (age 55); Ozark, Arkansas, U.S.
- Genres: Heavy metal, industrial metal, alternative metal, Dubstep
- Occupation: Musician
- Instruments: Guitar, vocals
- Years active: 1990-present

Mike Riggs (born April 23, 1971) is an American heavy metal guitarist, billed professionally as simply RiG̈G̈S. Riggs is best known for his guitar work on Skrew's Dusted and Rob Zombie's debut album amidst the Industrial metal boom of the 90s. Riggs is currently working with Zombie again touring in support of The Great Satan album.

In the years apart from Zombie, Riggs founded his Scum of the Ǝarth solo project. Riggs continues to release streaming singles under his SOTƎ moniker to this day.

== Career history ==
Riggs' career as a musician started at the age of 19 in 1990 when he started the band Demiltry in Austin, Texas, for whom he played the rhythm guitar and sang lead vocals. The band released only one record, a 4-track demo titled Artist of Misery for which Riggs composed the title song on the album. The band split up soon after the release. He went on after this to play for another Austin band called Skrew which included future Nine Inch Nails guitarist Danny Lohner. He toured with Skrew supporting their first album, Burning in Water, Drowning in Flames, then went on to contribute to the recording of their second release, Dusted. After playing with Skrew for several years, Riggs joined Prong after the release of their studio album Rude Awakening and toured with them for some time. When Riggs was attending a WWF event, he met Rob Zombie (ex-White Zombie) who said he was working on a new album, and had yet to find a guitarist. Riggs contributed various guitar riffs and recordings on Hellbilly Deluxe and The Sinister Urge. During these sessions new tracks were made for the House of 1000 Corpses soundtrack as well for led Zombie to contemplate for working with other musicians in the future or possibly commit to feature film directing indefinitely for the foreseeable future. So having discussed this Mike Riggs decided to leave the band after the Merry Mayhem tour to begin his own project. He founded the band Scum of the Earth for which he plays guitar and sings lead vocals. After signing to Eclipse Records, the band released their first album entitled Blah...Blah...Blah...Love Songs for the New Millennium on October 26, 2004, produced by famed producer Ben Burkhardt at Belt of Orion Recording in Los Angeles, California. Songs were featured in National Lampoon's TV: The Movie, on numerous MTV shows, and a slew of action sports DVDs. Riggs is best known for playing his own signature model Fernandes Vertigo with a kill switch and others with a sustainer. He also uses a wah pedal. He's used Marshall G100R CD, Diezel VH4 and Mesa Triple Rectifiers.

He is also known for playing his see-through Fernandes Vertigo guitar that is filled with fake blood that he pours on himself, drinks or spits into the crowd while playing.

In 2022 Riggs rejoined Rob Zombie's solo band when prior guitarist John 5 left to join Mötley Crüe.

== Discography ==
=== with Skrew ===
- 1994: Dusted

=== with Rob Zombie ===
- 1998: Hellbilly Deluxe: 13 Tales of Cadaverous Cavorting Inside the Spookshow International
- 2001: The Sinister Urge
- 2003: House of 1000 Corpses (guitar on title track & Pussy Liquor)
- 2026: The Great Satan

=== with Scum of the Ǝarth (SOTƎ) ===
- 2004: Blah...Blah...Blah...Love Songs for the New Millennium
- 2007: Sleaze Freak
- 2012: The Devil Made Me Do It
