= Rob Zombie =

American rock musician and filmmaker (born 1965)

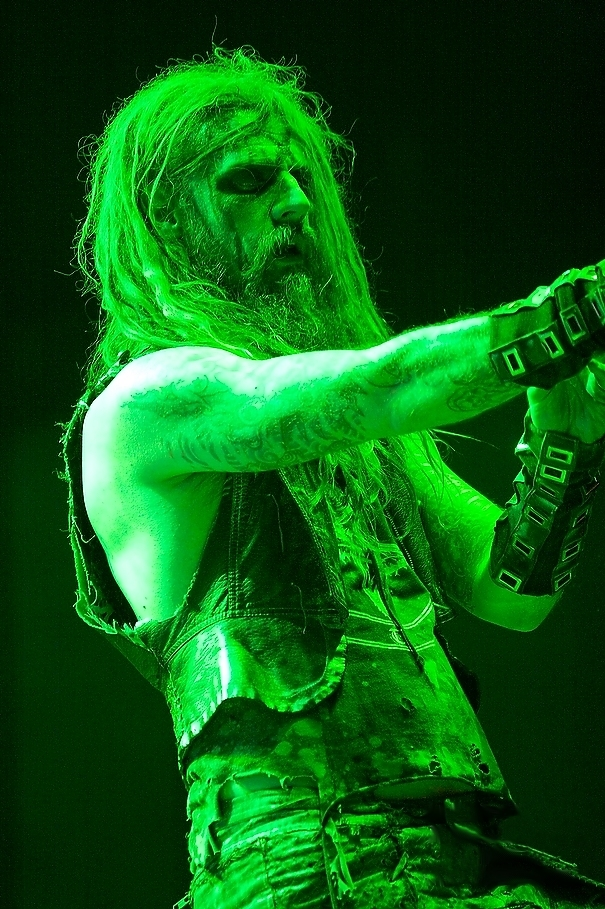
- Zombie performing at the San Manuel Amphitheater in 2010
- Born: Robert Bartleh Cummings; January 12, 1965 (age 61); Haverhill, Massachusetts, U.S.
- Other name: Rob Straker
- Occupations: Singer; songwriter; record producer; filmmaker; actor
- Years active: 1985–present
- Spouse: Sheri Moon (m. 2002)
- Relatives: Spider One (brother)
- Musical career
- Genres: Industrial metal; shock rock; groove metal; alternative metal; hard rock; nu metal
- Instruments: Vocals
- Works: Rob Zombie discography
- Labels: Roadrunner; Loud & Proud; Geffen; Zodiac Swan; Nuclear Blast
- Formerly of: L.A. Rats; White Zombie
- Website: robzombie.com

Robert Bartleh Cummings (born January 12, 1965), known professionally as Rob Zombie, is an American singer, songwriter, record producer, filmmaker and actor. His music and lyrics are notable for their horror and sci-fi themes, and his live shows have been praised for their elaborate shock rock theatricality. He rose to fame as a founding member and the frontman of heavy metal band White Zombie, with whom he released four studio albums and one techno remix album.

Zombie's first solo effort, the 1996 song "Hands of Death (Burn Baby Burn)" (with Alice Cooper), was nominated for a Grammy Award for Best Metal Performance. His debut solo studio album, Hellbilly Deluxe, was released in 1998. Hellbilly Deluxe sold over 3 million copies worldwide and spawned three singles. His second studio album, The Sinister Urge, was released in 2001 and became his second platinum album in the U.S. His third studio album, Educated Horses, was released in 2006. It became his third album to enter the top 10 of the Billboard 200, but saw a decrease in sales compared to his previous releases. His fourth studio album, Hellbilly Deluxe 2, was released in 2010 and peaked at no. 8 in the United States. Remix album, Mondo Sex Head, was released in 2012 and was followed by his fifth album Venomous Rat Regeneration Vendor in 2013. In 2016, Zombie released his sixth album, The Electric Warlock Acid Witch Satanic Orgy Celebration Dispenser, and his seventh studio album, The Lunar Injection Kool Aid Eclipse Conspiracy, was released in 2021. In 2026, he released his eighth studio album, The Great Satan.

Zombie directed the horror film House of 1000 Corpses in 2000, though the controversial project was not released until 2003, and has since been described as a cult classic. Zombie followed the film with two sequels in his Rejects trilogy: The Devil's Rejects (2005) and 3 from Hell (2019). After the success of his first two films he directed Halloween (2007), a remake of the classic 1978 horror film. The film became his highest-grossing to date, though it was generally received negatively by critics. He later directed Halloween II (2009), which failed to match the commercial success of its predecessor. Zombie has also directed the films The Haunted World of El Superbeasto (2009), The Lords of Salem (2012), 31 (2016), and The Munsters (2022).

== Early life ==
Zombie was born Robert Bartleh Cummings in Haverhill, Massachusetts, on January 12, 1965, the oldest son of Louise and Robert Cummings. His younger brother, Michael, uses the stage name Spider One and is the lead singer of Powerman 5000. Growing up, he had a fascination with horror films and "always wanted to be Alice Cooper, Steven Spielberg, Bela Lugosi, and Stan Lee". He has said of his childhood, "I didn't aspire to be anything. I was just a dopey kid. Basically everyone seemed amazing to me as a kid. I grew up in some nowhere town... anybody that even seemed remotely famous just seemed like they were on another planet."

Cummings' parents worked at a carnival. In 1977, when he was 12, his parents chose to leave after a riot broke out at the carnival and tents were set on fire. He said of the experience, "Everybody's pulling out guns, and you could hear guns going off. I remember this one guy we knew, he was telling us where to go, and some guy just ran up to him and hit him in the face with a hammer—just busted his face wide open. My parents packed up real quick, and we took off." He later elaborated, "I think someone just got ripped off for a lot of money on the gambling tents and they came back later and set the tents on fire [and] it turned into this big riot. [...] It was super violent and crazy and I think that was when my parents were like, 'You know what? We might be able to find something better to be doing here.' Because me and my brother are in the middle of this. Things are on fire, people beating the crap out of each other."

Cummings graduated from Haverhill High School in 1983. He moved to New York City and began attending Parsons School of Design, where he met eventual bandmate and girlfriend Sean Yseult. Before the success of White Zombie, he worked as a production assistant for the children's show Pee-wee's Playhouse. He took the stage name "Rob Zombie" from Bela Lugosi's 1932 horror film White Zombie, from which he also took White Zombie's band name. The name first shows up on White Zombie's 1989 EP God of Thunder. He had previously used the name "Rob Straker" on the White Zombie LPs Soul-Crusher and Make Them Die Slowly. In 1996, he made "Rob Zombie" his legal name.

== Career ==
=== 1985–1998: White Zombie ===
Cummings and Yseult co-founded the band that would become known as White Zombie. They broke up after seven years of dating, but continued to work in the band together. The band released three extended plays to little success, with their debut studio album Soul-Crusher following in 1987 through the band's own record label, Silent Explosion. They released their second studio album Make Them Die Slowly in 1989 to little commercial reaction. Yseult and Zombie ended their relationship in 1991 and Zombie began dating Sheri Moon shortly afterwards. The band caught the attention of Geffen Records following the release of their fourth extended play; their third studio album, La Sexorcisto: Devil Music Volume One, was released through the label in 1992. Although the album did not enter the Billboard 200 chart until about a year after its release, it became the band's breakout hit, going on to sell over two million copies in the United States. Two singles, "Thunder Kiss '65" and "Black Sunshine", were released to promote La Sexorcisto.

White Zombie's fourth and final studio album, Astro-Creep: 2000 – Songs of Love, Destruction and Other Synthetic Delusions of the Electric Head (1995), became their first and only to enter the top ten of the Billboard 200; it went on to sell over two million copies in the United States. Cummings directed the music video for the album's single "More Human than Human" (1995) and would go on to direct all subsequent videos for the band. In 1996, Cummings legally changed his name to Rob Zombie. White Zombie released a remix album that year, marking their final release before their eventual disbandment. Zombie collaborated with Alice Cooper on the song "Hands of Death (Burn Baby Burn)" (1996) for Songs in the Key of X: Music from and Inspired by the X-Files. The song was nominated in the category of Best Metal Performance at the 39th Annual Grammy Awards, though lost to Rage Against the Machine. White Zombie officially broke up in September 1998, with Zombie stating, "Sometimes a band just breaks up because the band has run its course and the best days are behind them. White Zombie went through a lot together and did tons of great stuff, but it was time to stop. The good times were over and we were all moving in different directions." A box-set for the group was released in 2008 featuring all of their released material.

Since the break up of White Zombie, Zombie has shown no interest in reforming the band: "I have many legit reasons [for not wanting to reform White Zombie]. Just because you don't know them does not mean they don't exist. Everything is not everybody's business." In a 2011 interview, Zombie stated that he had not spoken to any members of the band "except John Tempesta in about 15 years."

=== 1998–2001: Solo debut and commercial success ===
Work on Zombie's debut solo album first began in 1997, before the band had officially broken up. For the album, Zombie worked with numerous artists, including Charlie Clouser of Nine Inch Nails fame and former White Zombie bandmate John Tempesta. Zombie's solo debut album, Hellbilly Deluxe: 13 Tales of Cadaverous Cavorting Inside the Spookshow International, was released on August 25, 1998. The album was a commercial success, debuting at number five on the Billboard 200 with first week sales of 121,000 copies. The album's first week sales topped that of his prior albums with White Zombie. Hellbilly Deluxe went on to become Zombie's highest selling album to date, with sales exceeding three million copies in the United States. The album was influenced by classic horror films, with numerous songs on the album containing samples and quotes from some of Zombie's favorite horror films. The album spawned three singles, all of which charted on the Billboard Hot Mainstream Rock Tracks chart. Numerous songs from the album were used in films and video games, mainly in the horror genre. The success of the album led to the release of Zombie's first remix album, American Made Music to Strip By (1999). The album entered the top forty of the Billboard 200 in its debut week.

Zombie formed his own record label, Zombie-A-Go-Go Records, in 1998. The label released the final album from American instrumental band The Bomboras, as well as the debut album from the Ghastly Ones. Both albums were released on June 2, 1998, though received little critical or commercial success. The label next released the compilation album Halloween Hootenanny (1998), featuring appearances from artists such as Reverend Horton Heat and Rocket From the Crypt. Zombie himself contributed the song "Halloween (She Get So Mean)" to the soundtrack, which had previously appeared on promotional releases of "Dragula" (1998). Zombie released the album Rob Zombie Presents The Words & The Music Of Frankenstein on October 12, 1999, through Zombie-A-Go-Go Records. The album, considered a soundtrack, features the original score and some dialogue from the original Frankenstein (1931).

Zombie was set to make his directorial debut with the film The Crow: 2037, and even wrote the film's script. The film was set to take place in the future, though it was never released. It was decided that the film was not suited for the franchise, but would instead serve as a standalone project. He composed the original score for the video game Twisted Metal III, released in 1998. Zombie designed a haunted attraction for Universal Studios in 1999, which was later deemed instrumental in reviving the Halloween Horror Nights annual attraction. It was during this time that Zombie began working with the studio on his directorial debut, a film titled House of 1000 Corpses. The project began filming in May 2000 with a scheduled release date of the following year, though the studio ultimately cancelled its release due to the violent themes present throughout the film. Zombie's song "Superbeast", taken from Hellbilly Deluxe, received a nomination for Best Metal Performance at the 42nd Annual Grammy Awards. Zombie contributed the song "Scum of the Earth" (2000) to the Mission: Impossible 2 soundtrack.

Zombie's second studio album, The Sinister Urge, was released on November 13, 2001. The album expands on the horror and shock rock elements seen in his debut album, and features collaborations with artists such as Ozzy Osbourne. The album became his second to enter the top ten in the United States, with its first week sales topping that of his previous album. The album went on to sell over one million copies in the United States, his second to accomplish this feat. The album was preceded by the single "Feel So Numb", with a second single being released the following year. Despite the album's success, it was noted as a decline in sales when compared to his first studio album. The Sinister Urge and its subsequent singles were met with a positive critical reception, with AllMusic writing "It is the slow burn of [the album's] last track that shows the most promise; after years of making good heavy metal, he finally expands the boundaries of his own sound. Few metal musicians kept their sound fresh for as long as Zombie, and this album is no exception." The Sinister Urge was voted as the fans' favorite album on Zombie's official website. The album is the final project to feature guitarist Mike Riggs and drummer John Tempesta, who had been with Zombie since the start of his solo career.

=== 2002–2006: Marriage, directorial debut, and continued musical success ===
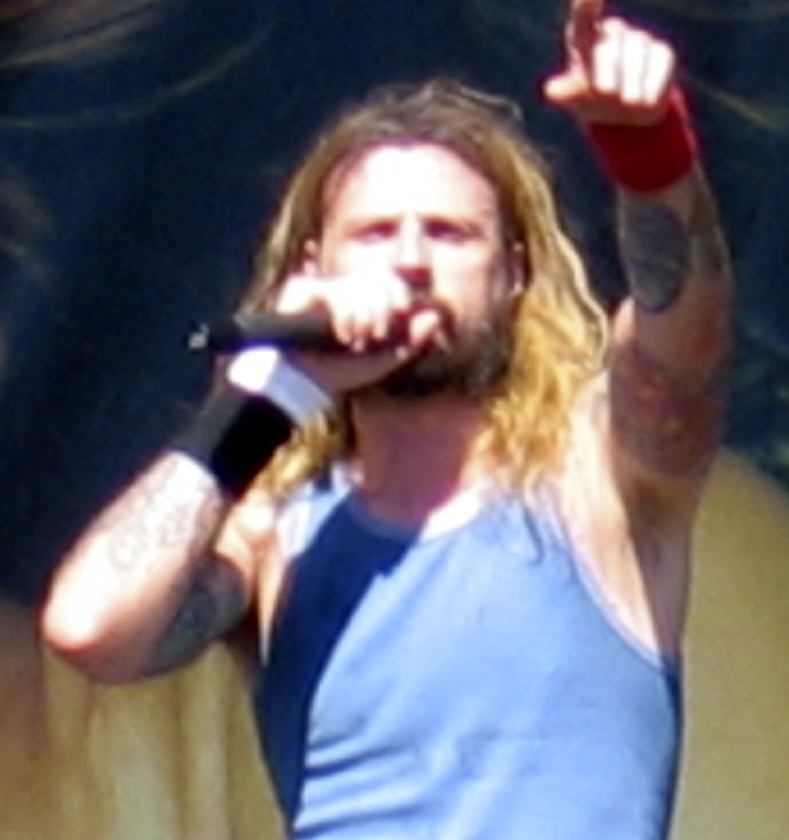
Zombie at Ozzfest 2005

Following years of struggling to find a distributor and various re-shoots, Zombie confirmed that his film House of 1000 Corpses would finally be released through Lions Gate Entertainment. The film was released theatrically on April 11, 2003. The film received a generally negative reception from critics, though it grossed over $16 million worldwide. The film was criticized for being too "grotesque" and "violent", but has since garnered a cult following. Despite vastly negative reviews, the film garnered a warmer reception in later years, and is frequently listed as one of the "best horror films ever made". Zombie worked with Scott Humphrey on the majority of the film's soundtrack, which was released on March 25, 2003. The release features original songs from Zombie such as "Pussy Liquor" and "Little Piggy", as well as Zombie's own rendition of the Commodores hit single "Brick House" (1977), re-titled "Brick House 2003". The soundtrack peaked at number fifty-three on the Billboard 200, and number four on the Top Soundtracks chart.

Zombie released his first compilation album, titled Past, Present & Future, on September 23, 2003. The release featured a collection of songs taken from Zombie's solo albums as well as his releases with White Zombie; new material is also present on the album. The album debuted at number eleven on the Billboard 200, and would go on to become Zombie's third release to sell over one million copies in the country. Zombie guest starred on episodes of both Spider-Man: The New Animated Series and Justice League Unlimited that year, in a voice only role for both. In November 2003, Zombie launched his Spookshow International comic book series. His second series, The Nail, spawned four issues between June and October 2004, while his Bigfoot series lasted from February to May 2005, featuring four issues. Zombie's second film, The Devil's Rejects, serves as a direct sequel to House of 1000 Corpses, and was released on July 22, 2005. The film featured a more "violent Western film" theme as opposed to the horror aspects of its predecessor. The film received a much more positive reception than its predecessor, though was still criticized for its violence and material. The film has been described as "one giant loogie that comes straight from the heart", filled with moments of nihilism and cunning wit. Much like the first film, The Devil's Rejects went on to gain a cult following after its release. The film has a 53 out of 100 rating on Metacritic, meaning mixed to positive reviews. Zombie released a number of The Devil's Rejects comics throughout 2005 to coincide with the film.

Zombie began working on his third studio album in 2005, whilst finishing work on The Devil's Rejects; the album was influenced by glam rock artists like Slade, T. Rex, and Gary Glitter. The release was described as "experimental" by Zombie, who claimed the project featured numerous acoustic-led songs. The album, Educated Horses, was released on March 28, 2006. It sold 107,000 copies in its first week, becoming Zombie's third album to enter the top ten on the Billboard 200. The album received mixed critical reviews, with Rolling Stone writing "A handful of cuts are too long on sludgy instrumental grooves, but whether Zombie is out-Trent Reznoring Trent Reznor on the sitar-laden grindfest '17 Year Locust' or spitting fire amid the apocalyptic blues riffs of 'The Devil's Rejects', he sounds like a gifted schlockmeister that Strokes fans can enjoy. Or at least tolerate." The song "The Lords of Salem" was nominated for Best Hard Rock Performance at the 51st Annual Grammy Awards. Educated Horses saw a further decline in sales for Zombie, selling just over 500,000 copies in the United States. The album became his first studio album as a solo artist to not receive a certification from the Recording Industry Association of America (RIAA). It served as Zombie's final studio album to be released through Geffen Records. Zombie had a cameo appearance in a voice only role for the film Slither (2006). Zombie released his first official greatest hits album, The Best of Rob Zombie, on October 10, 2006. The album was re-released only months later under the title The Best of Rob Zombie: 20th Century Masters The Millennium Collection. The project debuted at number 166 on the Billboard 200, and went on to receive a gold certification from the RIAA. The album featured no new material, and was released with little promotion on Zombie's behalf. It remains his final album to receive an RIAA certification to date.

=== 2007–2009: Focus on film work ===
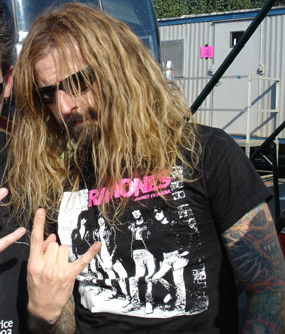
Zombie during Ozzfest 2007

Zombie opted to focus on his career as a director in 2007, following the release of his third studio album a year prior. It was confirmed in 2006 that Zombie had signed on to write and direct a remake of the horror classic Halloween (1978). Zombie later referred to the film as a "re-imagining" of the original John Carpenter film. Zombie's version of the film was officially released on August 31, 2007. Thanks to its opening weekend of $30.5 million, the film broke the box-office record for the Labor Day weekend, surpassing the record set in 2005 by Transporter 2 with $20.1 million. It currently resided as the top Labor Day weekend grosser for fourteen years until Marvel's Shang-Chi and the Legend of the Ten Rings in 2021. The film went on to become Zombie's highest grossing release to date. Despite these achievements, the film was generally panned by critics upon its release. Based on 109 reviews collected by Rotten Tomatoes, Halloween received an average 25% overall approval rating based on 110 reviews, with the consensus "Rob Zombie doesn't bring many new ideas to the table in Halloween, making it another bloody disappointment for fans of the franchise." Zombie directed a fictitious trailer for a film Werewolf Women of the SS, which was featured in the film Grindhouse (2007). That same year, Zombie released his first live album, Zombie Live.

Zombie announced work on a new film, Tyrannosaurus Rex, which was slated for release in 2009; the film was ultimately scrapped. Despite previous comments made by Zombie that he would not do a sequel to Halloween, it was later announced he would both write and direct the series' next film, tentatively titled H2. H2 was ultimately the reason for the postponement and eventual cancellation of Tyrannosaurus Rex. Halloween II was released on August 28, 2009. The film received a worse critical reception than Zombie's original remake and failed to achieve the commercial success of the remake, but was a box office success nevertheless. Unlike the original Halloween II (1981), Zombie's version of the film focused on the prior film's survivor and the effects that the film's events had on her mentality. Following the completion of the film, Zombie confirmed he would not make another sequel. Variety Magazine announced the weekend before the release of Halloween II that Zombie would be directing a remake of the 1950s film The Blob. Zombie later chose to back out of the film as he "didn't want to do another remake".

The day that Halloween II was released, Zombie and Jesse Dayton released the album Rob Zombie Presents Captain Clegg and the Night Creatures, based on the band featured in the film's party scene. The album was released through Zombie's own Zombie-A-Go-Go Records, the first album released through the label in almost ten years. There were initial reports of a film centering around Captain Clegg, though the project never materialized. Dayton later toured in character as the band as the opening act for Zombie throughout 2009 and 2010. The release of Rob Zombie Presents Captain Clegg and the Night Creatures marks the final release from Zombie-A-Go-Go Records, before Zombie formed his new Zodiac Swan label in 2013. Zombie was the executive producer of the animated film The Haunted World of El Superbeasto, based upon his comic book series The Adventures of El Superbeasto. The series previously appeared in his Spookshow International comic book. The film was released in limited showings at selected theaters on September 12, 2009, and to DVD & Blu-Ray on September 22, 2009. It features the voices of Tom Papa, Paul Giamatti, Zombie's wife Sheri Moon Zombie, and Rosario Dawson. The film received a generally mixed reaction upon its release.

=== 2010–2015: New label and return to music ===
It was announced in 2009 that Zombie had begun working on his fourth studio album, the follow-up to his 2006 album Educated Horses. The album was originally scheduled to be released on November 17, 2009, but was delayed following Zombie's departure from longtime label Geffen Records on October 29, 2009, after which he penned a new deal with Roadrunner Records. Zombie later claimed that Geffen had "morphed into a different label" and that being signed didn't "work for [him] anymore." The album was confirmed to be titled Hellbilly Deluxe 2: Noble Jackals, Penny Dreadfuls and the Systematic Dehumanization of Cool, with Zombie describing it as a sequel to his 1998 debut as they sounded similar in both "vibe" and "attitude". Hellbilly Deluxe 2 was released on February 2, 2010. The album sold 49,000 copies in its first week of release, becoming his fourth top ten album in the United States. The album received a mixed to positive critical reception upon its release. Zombie released a special edition of the album on September 28, 2010, featuring three new songs. Zombie promoted the release through his Hellbilly Deluxe 2 World Tour, which served as his first international tour since beginning his solo career. The tour featured 150 dates, spanning over a two-year time span. Zombie released the Icon greatest hits album on October 5, 2010, through Roadrunner Records.

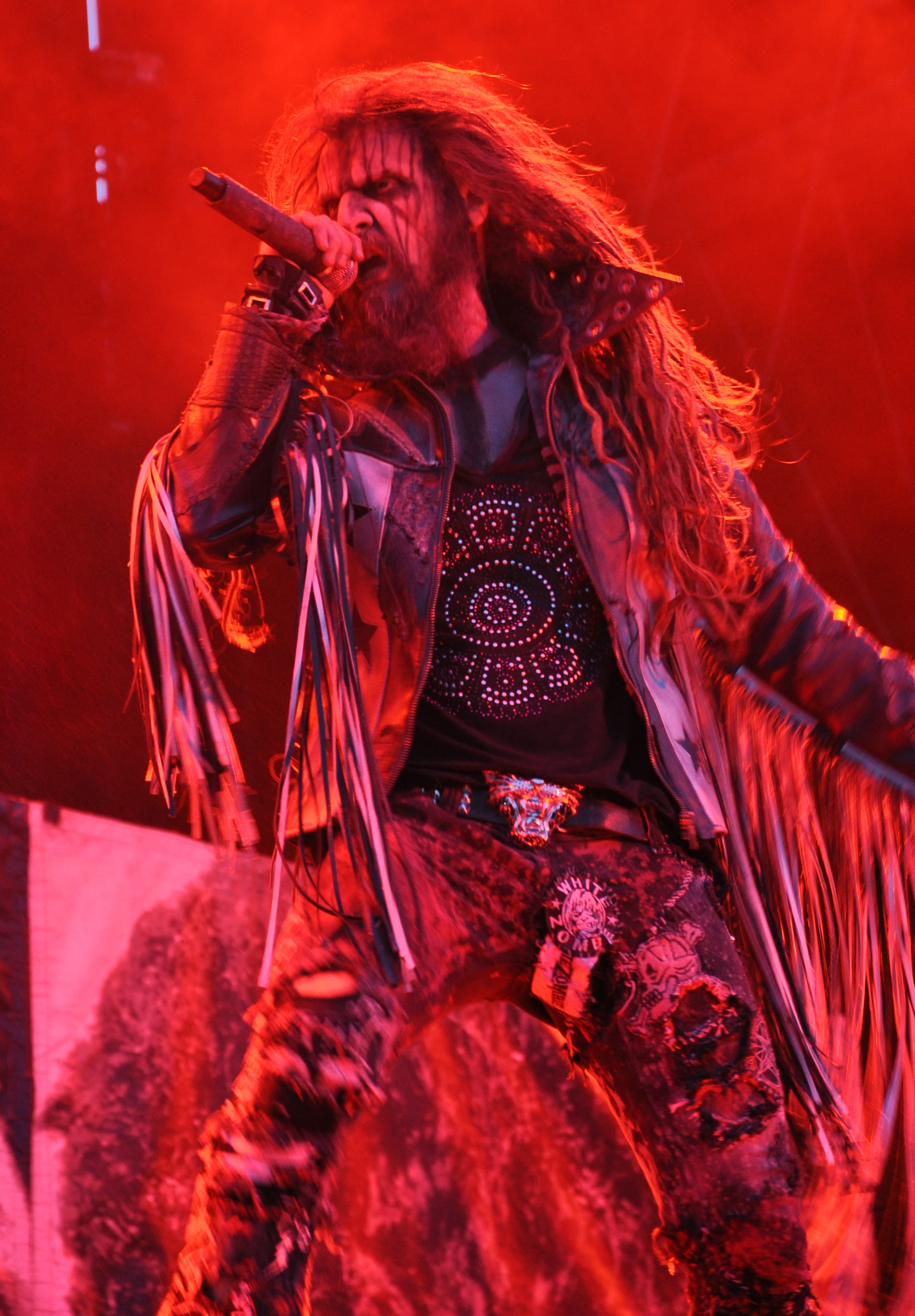
Zombie performing at Rock am Ring 2014

Zombie launched his seventh and final comic book series, Whatever Happened to Baron Von Shock?, in 2010; the series spanned four issues. Zombie had another voice-only role in the 2010 film Super, portraying God. In 2011, Zombie directed a horror-themed commercial for Woolite. Zombie announced work on the horror film The Lords of Salem in 2011. The film, whose name is derived from the Rob Zombie song of the same name, is about a coven of witches in modern-day Salem, Massachusetts. In an interview Zombie said that the film would be his cinematically biggest film and described it as "if Ken Russell directed The Shining". The Lords of Salem premiered at the Toronto International Film Festival on September 10, 2012, with a limited theatrical release following in April 2013. The Lords of Salem became the last film of veteran actor Richard Lynch, who died in 2012.

Zombie later stated that Tyrannosaurus Rex would be his next released film after The Lords of Salem, though the project has since been put on hold for a second time. In 2012, it was confirmed that Zombie would be writing and directing a film titled The Broad Street Bullies, which would be based on the Philadelphia Flyers hockey team. The film will be Zombie's first non-horror film. He has since stated that the film was in the "research stages", and a release date is unknown. Much like Tyrannosaurus Rex, the film, along with Rock Bottom Creek, has been put on hold indefinitely. Zombie released a second remix album, titled Mondo Sex Head, on August 6, 2012. The album featured remixed material from Zombie's first four studio albums, as well as his releases with White Zombie. The album was released through Geffen Records, despite Zombie having left the label. Zombie embarked on the Twins of Evil Tour with American rock band Marilyn Manson beginning on September 28, 2012. The tour concluded following a publicized feud between the artists while on tour, with the two groups often feuding while on stage. The tour officially concluded on December 12, 2012.

Recording for Zombie's fifth studio album began in June 2012, with Zombie announcing the then-untitled project in July 2012. On the record, Zombie claimed "We just want to make a dark, heavy, weird record and stick to that idea [...] If something comes up that isn't, we won't finish it. We'll stick to the plan." Zombie parted ways with Roadrunner Records, instead releasing the album through his new record label Zodiac Swan through Universal Music Enterprises and T-Boy Records. On January 30, 2013, Zombie announced that the album was titled Venomous Rat Regeneration Vendor. The album was released on April 23, 2013. Venomous Rat Regeneration Vendor became Zombie's fifth consecutive studio album to debut inside the top ten of the Billboard 200, though it boasted his lowest first week sales of his career. The album has since become Zombie's lowest selling album to date.

Zombie designed and launched the Great American Nightmare haunted attraction in 2013. The attraction, based in Chicago, featured references to Zombie's films and other significant horror events in pop culture. He designed the attractions "Lords of Salem Total Black Out", "The Haunted World of El Superbeasto 3D", and "House of 1000 Corpses", which were combined with a music festival from artists in hard rock, alternative, EDM, and more in 2013. In 2014, Zombie had the voice-only role of Ravager Navigator in the superhero film Guardians of the Galaxy. He released his first video album, The Zombie Horror Picture Show, on May 19, 2014. He released his second live album, Spookshow International: Live, on February 24, 2015.

=== 2016–2022: 31, 3 from Hell, The Munsters and more albums ===
Zombie announced work on his sixth studio album as early as April 2014, having begun working on the project that January. On January 11, 2016, Zombie confirmed the title of the record to be The Electric Warlock Acid Witch Satanic Orgy Celebration Dispenser, along with the album's cover art and track listing. The album was released on April 29, 2016. Zombie described it as "seriously [their] heaviest most fucked up musical monster to date." Zombie began working on a new horror film, 31, in 2014. Zombie described the film as "old-school", and raised money for the film through crowdfunding. The film follows a group of individuals attempting to survive a night in a carnival filled with murderous clowns. Zombie has stated that he wanted to have a "very nasty, gritty, guerilla-style approach to the filmmaking" for 31, as it "fits the story and the vibe of the movie". 31 premiered at the 2016 Sundance Film Festival on January 23, 2016. It has been announced that Zombie signed on to direct the film Raised Eyebrows, a movie about the life of comedian and actor Julius Henry "Groucho" Marx. The film has yet to receive a release date. Zombie launched his "Spookshow International" pinball machine in February 2016. The limited edition item features ten of Zombie's classic songs, as well as voice contributions from Zombie, Sheri Moon, and Sid Haig. On May 22, 2017, Zombie posted a short snippet of audio to his Instagram account of a live recording of the White Zombie song "Electric Head Part 2" stating he was in the process of mixing the Astro Creep 2000 live set from the Chicago date of the 2016 Riot Fest.

In July 2018, Zombie embarked on the Twins of Evil: The Second Coming Tour in the US with co-headliner Marilyn Manson and special guest Deadly Apples. Zombie released a trailer to his third instalment of the Firefly trilogy in June 2019. The film—titled 3 from Hell—was released on DVD and Blu-ray on October 15, 2019, following a three-day theatrical release held by Fathom Events from September 16–18, 2019.

On August 1, 2017, Zombie announced on his Instagram page that he had begun working on his seventh studio album. Guitarist John 5 described the album as "his Sgt. Pepper", and called it "the best Zombie record that he's ever done." Zombie's first song in four years, "The Triumph of King Freak (A Crypt of Preservation and Superstition)", was released on October 30, 2020. Deemed a "ferocious blast of big guitar metal", it serves as the first single from his seventh album The Lunar Injection Kool Aid Eclipse Conspiracy, released on March 12, 2021. The album was produced by Zeuss, who also produced The Electric Warlock. Zombie had focused primarily on filming in the years prior.

In May 2021, it was announced that Rob Zombie, John 5, Nikki Sixx and Tommy Clufetos formed a supergroup called L.A. Rats. Their debut track, a cover of "I've Been Everywhere", is from the soundtrack to the Liam Neeson film The Ice Road. The following month, Zombie confirmed he would direct a film adaptation of the television series The Munsters, which was released on digital, DVD, Blu-Ray, and Netflix on September 27, 2022.

=== 2022–present: Reunions with original band members and The Great Satan ===
Following John 5's departure from Zombie's band in 2022 after a 17-year tenure to join Mötley Crüe, it was confirmed in January 2023 that original guitarist Mike Riggs had rejoined the band. In May 2023, Zombie announced work had begun on his eighth solo album, which he hoped to release by the summer of 2024. In 2023, Zombie co-headlined the Freaks on Parade tour with Alice Cooper, with Filter and Ministry acting as the opening acts. The tour spanned from August 24 until September 24, visiting 19 venues across the United States and Canada. In 2024, original bassist Rob "Blasko" Nicholson reunited with the band, replacing long-time bassist Piggy D.

On September 16, 2025, a book about the making of House of 1000 Corpses featuring illustrations, screenplay excerpts, interviews, and Zombie's own thoughts on the film's production was released. Speaking of the book's conceit and release, Zombie said, "One day while organizing it I thought, 'What's the point of keeping all this stuff? This should all be in a book.' So when the 20th anniversary of the film hit back in 2023, I was inspired to finally put it together."

On October 10, 2025, Zombie released the single "Punks and Demons" on streaming services coinciding with the announcement of his eighth studio album, The Great Satan. A second and third single, "Heathen Days" and "(I'm a) Rock 'N' Roller", were released on November 21, 2025, and January 23, 2026, respectively. The album was released on February 27, 2026, and will be promoted by another Freaks on Parade Tour. This tour will run from August 21 to September 21 at amphitheatres and arenas through the United States and Canada, and will see Zombie performing alongside co-headliner Marilyn Manson, with support acts The Hu and Orgy.

== Artistry ==
=== Musical style ===
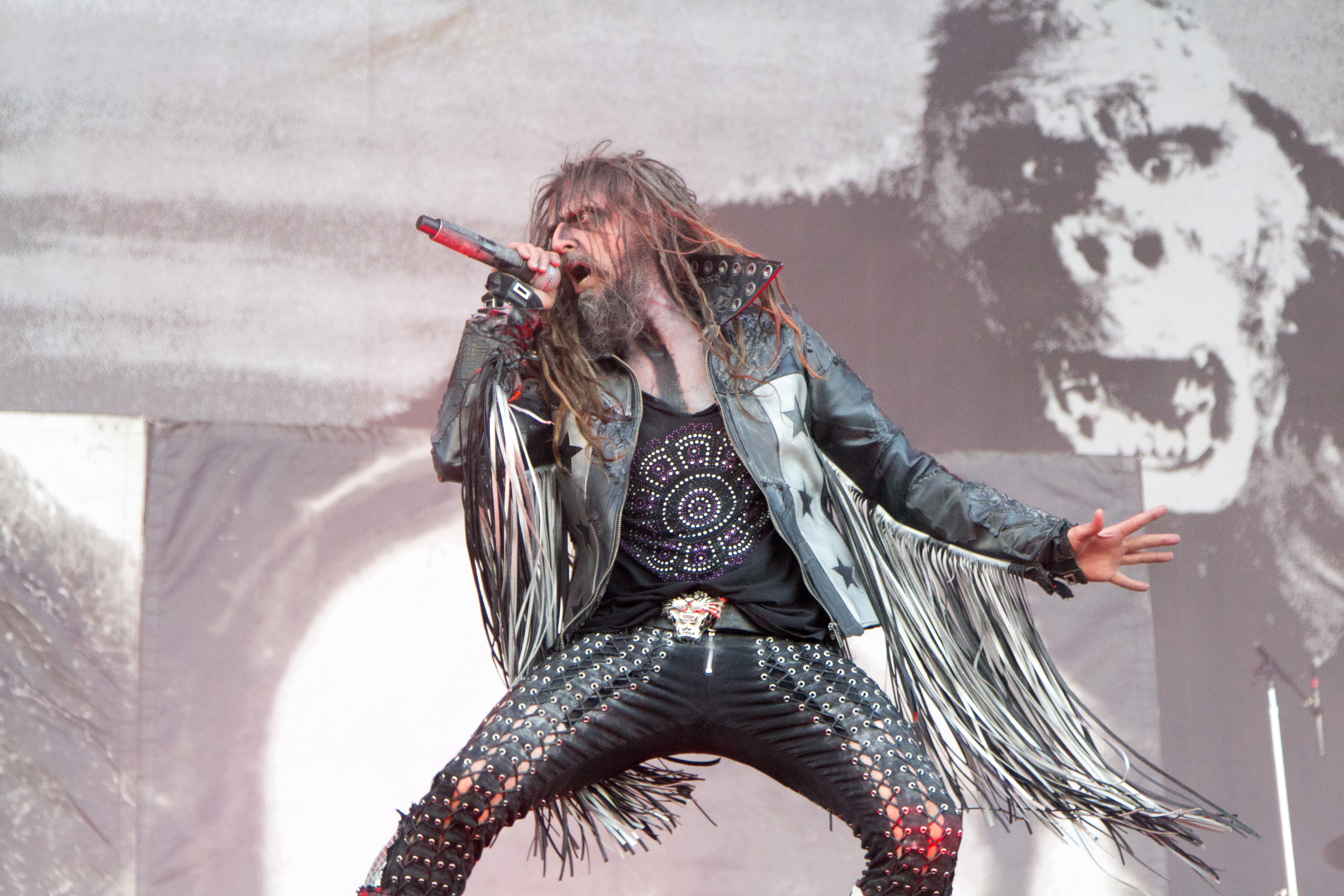
Zombie at Nova Rock 2014

Zombie's music has been noted for its use of horror and suspense elements, which is inspired by Zombie's love of horror films. Zombie's music also contains elements commonly found in heavy metal music. Zombie's music has been described as "melding metal with industrial, hypnotic rhythms and haunting sounds" and having a "complicated beat, distinctive vocals and a killer story line". Zombie's songs have also been known to feature quotes and samples from classic horror films. Numerous songs on his debut album, Hellbilly Deluxe, feature quotes from classic horror films that Zombie grew up with. Zombie has classified himself as a metal musician, and stated "It felt like hard rock and heavy metal had really been struggling you know, like top of the charts – it felt like they were being kicked to the curb for a long time. It was almost like you were doing something but you feel like nobody cares anymore so now you're just chuggin' along doing what you do and it's like the world had forgotten. However it's felt like in the last few years that's kind of changed and you feel it coming back."

In their review of Venomous Rat Regeneration Vendor (2013), Music Enthusiast commented on Zombie's musical style "If you are a fan of Rob Zombie's, or even if you aren't, you can definitely recognize his style of music- that is to say, if Alice Cooper wrote songs for strip clubs. Rob Zombie albums have always had bombastic, almost danceable grooves, over the top guitar effects [...] and loads of B-movie sci-fi/horror lyrics." He is also noted for using "spoken word lyrics" in numerous songs, a style he began while with White Zombie. AllMusic compared the musical themes of Hellbilly Deluxe to a White Zombie record, stating it was "complete with thunderous industrial rhythms, drilling metal guitars, and B-movie obsessions." Entertainment Weekly spoke about the album's horror film qualities, stating it had "concocted a veritable blood feast of hair-raising guitars, spine-tingling drum loops, and a cast of ghoulish characters who could be refugees from an old William Castle horror flick." Legends Magazine wrote that "the songs follow the same formula of anger, sex, death, monster, demon, zombie, satanic, drug abuse kinda raw drive a tractor over your neighbor's skull kinda hate the world so I'll burn it all down music." AllMusic wrote in their review of American Made Music to Strip By that Hellbilly Deluxe had a "sexy, sleazy, horror-movie vibe".

While The Sinister Urge continues the themes of horror and suspense, it is noted as featuring more dance-oriented beats in songs such as "Never Gonna Stop (The Red Red Kroovy)". Zombie claimed that whereas Hellbilly Deluxe featured electronics, The Sinister Urge was recorded with a live band as to emphasize the instrumentals. With the Educated Horses album, Zombie further distanced himself from the sound of his first two albums. Zombie described the album as experimental, and explored a number of acoustic productions with John 5. Despite a shift in sound, many of the album's lyrics feature horror elements found on his prior releases. Hellbilly Deluxe 2, Zombie's fourth studio album, saw a return to the heavy metal sound of his early releases. The album was considered a direct sequel to his debut studio album, with which it shares a name. Venomous Rat Regeneration Vendor continued these themes, and features "bass-heavy" beats. The record was deemed a throwback to his debut album due to similar lyrical and sonic themes.

=== Influences ===
Both Zombie's music and film work draws influence from classic horror and suspense films, with Zombie citing the 1970s as the "last great time where films were being made for the sake of the film and not for the sake of the money." Zombie has cited artists such as Alice Cooper, Kiss, Queen, and Elton John as influences during his childhood. Zombie claimed that the first record he ever bought was an Alice Cooper album. Metallica, Black Sabbath, Judas Priest, Slayer, Ministry, Pantera, Sepultura, Black Flag and Twisted Sister were also cited as influences by Zombie. Zombie claimed his mother would not allow him to watch horror films, namely The Texas Chain Saw Massacre (1974), which later served as an influence on Zombie's films House of 1000 Corpses and The Devil's Rejects. Zombie has directed the majority of his music videos as a solo artist, with numerous releases being influenced or referencing horror films. The music video for his single "Living Dead Girl" is based upon the silent horror film The Cabinet of Dr. Caligari (1920), while his video for "Never Gonna Stop (The Red Red Kroovy)" was heavily inspired by A Clockwork Orange (1971). His film The Lords of Salem was inspired by the horror classic The Shining (1980).

== Personal life ==
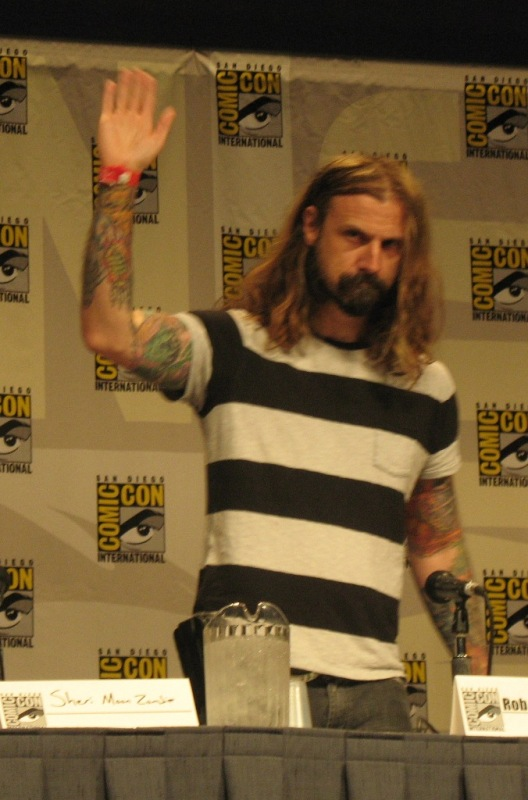
Zombie at San Diego Comic-Con in 2007

Zombie dated his White Zombie bandmate Sean Yseult from 1984 until 1991, though they continued to work in the band together after their breakup. Zombie began dating actress Sheri Moon in 1993, and they were married at Graceland Wedding Chapel in Las Vegas on October 31, 2002. They originally set their wedding date for November 9, but eloped 10 days before. They split their time between a home in Los Angeles and a farm in Connecticut.

Zombie's public image has often been denoted by his long hair, large beard, industrial fashion sense, and horror-themed makeup. A self-described ethical vegan, he and his wife use their Connecticut property to house rescued farm animals. He originally became a vegetarian in 1982 after viewing footage of a slaughterhouse. He is a supporter of PETA, which thanked him for the portrayal of the link between childhood animal abuse and psychopathy in his remake of Halloween, calling it an accurate depiction of a warning sign for future violence.

Zombie generally refrains from sharing his political and religious beliefs with the public, though he has mentioned that his mother once contemplated becoming a nun. In the same interview, he said that he avoids all alcohol and drugs because he "certainly didn't achieve anything by being wasted and fucked up". In a separate interview, he said that he does not believe in an afterlife and the concept of Heaven was "insane", believing that "this life is all you get". He also said that he does not believe in concepts such as UFOs, aliens, or Bigfoot. He criticized the initial cancellation of the 2020 horror film The Hunt following an outcry from U.S. President Donald Trump and his supporters, stating, "As far as [canceling] The Hunt, that's just a bullshit sacrificial lamb that solves nothing in society, but they always do that. If it wasn't that movie it would have been a video game or sometimes it was somebody's rock album."

== Band members ==
Current

- Rob Zombie – lead vocals (1997–present)
- Mike Riggs – guitars, backing vocals (1997–2003, 2022–present)
- Blasko – bass, backing vocals (1997–2006, 2024–present)
- Ryan Goff – drums (2026–present)

== Discography ==
Studio albums

- Hellbilly Deluxe: 13 Tales of Cadaverous Cavorting Inside the Spookshow International (1998)
- The Sinister Urge (2001)
- Educated Horses (2006)
- Hellbilly Deluxe 2: Noble Jackals, Penny Dreadfuls and the Systematic Dehumanization of Cool (2010)
- Venomous Rat Regeneration Vendor (2013)
- The Electric Warlock Acid Witch Satanic Orgy Celebration Dispenser (2016)
- The Lunar Injection Kool Aid Eclipse Conspiracy (2021)
- The Great Satan (2026)

== Filmography ==
=== Film ===
Year	Title	Director	Writer	Producer	Music Department	Notes
2003	House of 1000 Corpses	Yes	Yes	No	Yes	Co-composer
2005	The Devil's Rejects	Yes	Yes	Yes	No	
2007	Halloween	Yes	Yes	Yes	Yes	Music supervisor
2009	Halloween II	Yes	Yes	Yes	Yes	Music supervisor
2009	The Haunted World of El Superbeasto	Yes	Yes	Yes	No	Direct-to-DVD, cowritten with Tom Papa
2012	The Lords of Salem	Yes	Yes	Yes	No	
2016	31	Yes	Yes	Yes	Yes	Co-composer
2019	3 from Hell	Yes	Yes	Yes	Yes	Executive music producer
2022	The Munsters	Yes	Yes	Yes	No	

==== Cameos ====
Year	Title	Role
2003	House of 1000 Corpses	Dr. Wolfenstein's assistant (uncredited)
2006	Slither	Voice cameo: Dr. Karl
2010	Super	Voice cameo: God
2017	Guardians of the Galaxy Vol. 2	Voice cameo: Unseen Ravager

=== Television ===
Year	Title	Director	Actor	Notes
1986	Pee-wee's Playhouse	No	No	Production assistant
1997	Space Ghost Coast to Coast	No	No	Episode: "Piledriver"
2003	Spider-Man: The New Animated Series	No	Yes	Dr. Curt Connors / The Lizard (voice); Episode: "Law of the Jungle"
2003	MTV Icon	No	No	Episode: "Metallica"
2003	I Love the '70s	No	No	
2003	I Love the '80s Strikes Back	No	No	
2003	Justice League	No	Yes	Ichthultu (voice); Episode: "The Terror Beyond: Part II"
2005	Metal: A Headbangers Journey	No	No	Documentary
2006	Heavy: The Story of Metal	No	No	Documentary miniseries
2006	I Love the '70s Volume 2	No	No	
2010	CSI: Miami	Yes	No	Episode: "LA"
2010	That Metal Show	No	No	Guest; Episode: "Rob Zombie"
2010	WWE Raw	No	No	Guest hosted the June 28 edition
2010	Behind the Music: Remastered	No	No	Episode: "Alice Cooper"
2010	Halloween: The Inside Story	No	No	Himself
2011	Metal Evolution	No	No	Episode: "Shock Rock"
2011	Halloween Wars	No	No	Season 1: Episode:3 (Zombies vs. Vampires)
2012	Tom Papa: Live in New York City	Yes	No	Stand-up special
2014	Ink Master	No	No	Guest judge Episode: "Ink Master Explosion"
2016	Mr. Pickles	No	Yes	Ordutheus (voice); Episode: "Vegans"

== See also ==
- Rob Zombie's unrealized projects
