= Scott Humphrey =

Canadian record producer

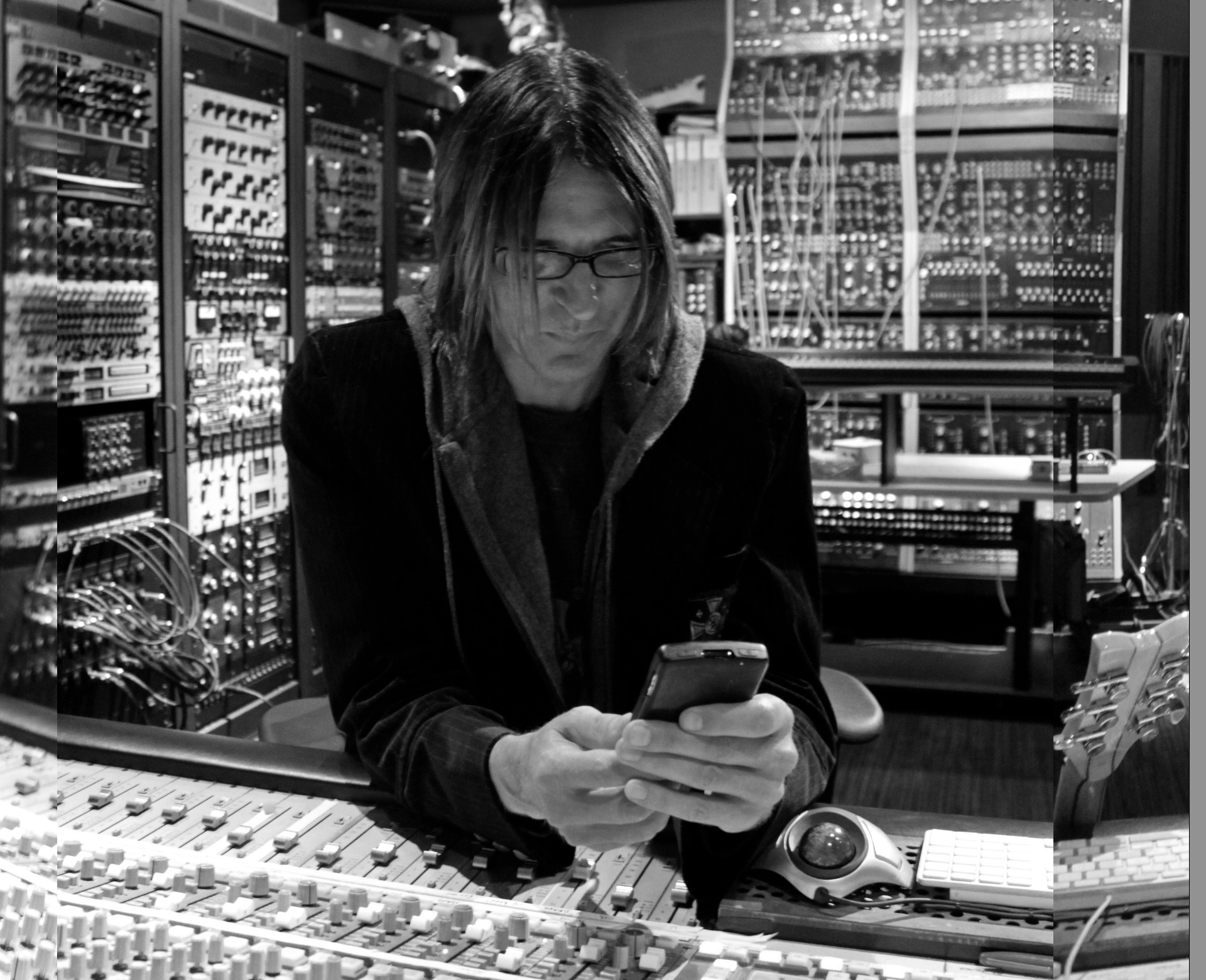
- Humphrey in The Chop Shop

Background information
- Born: October 20, 1963 (age 63)
- Occupation: Record producer; mix engineer
- Instrument: Keyboards (primary)

Scott Humphrey (born October 20, 1963) is a Canadian record producer and engineer. Humphrey began his music career as a keyboard player and programmer. He is best known for his work with multiplatinum recording artist Rob Zombie and has co-written and mixed all of his albums produced under his Geffen Records contract, including the score to Zombie's debut feature film House of 1000 Corpses. Much of the production work was done at Humphrey's home studio, affectionately known as The Chop Shop.

He is widely known for his keyboards, producing, engineering, mixing and remixing, and digital audio skills with Mötley Crüe, Metallica, Fuel, Methods of Mayhem, BT, Monster Magnet, Tommy Lee, Day of Fire, Powerman 5000, The Cult, Andrew WK, Spineshank, *NSYNC and many more. Humphrey has also co-authored and arranged songs with some of the artists he has worked with.

According to Digidesign's chief software programmer Mark Jeffery, Humphrey conceptualized and motivated him to write Beat Detective, Batch Crossfades and Sound Replacer for the Pro Tools audio workstation platform.

Humphrey was also the co-founder of Artist 2 Market Distribution in 2004, which offered artists an avenue of direct to retail marketing while still retaining the ownership of their original master recordings. A2M achieved a number 1 country single with Tracy Lawrence with the hit song "Find Out Who Your Friends Are" from 2007. Artist 2 Market was acquired by Rocket Science in 2009.

He is the founder of the iPhone application Jammit that utilizes the master recordings from various artists in the music industry. Featured artists include Alice Cooper, Boston, Foreigner, No Doubt, Nickelback, Sum 41, Godsmack and many more. As of December 2011, Jammit was available for the iPad, iPhone, iPod touch using IOS 5.0 and lastly, the desktop version for Mac OS X (10.6.8 or higher) which beta tested in February and released in mid March. Future releases of the application are slated for desktop PC before summer 2012. An Android version is being considered for release in the near future but Scott has stated this will require redevelopment of the app from the ground up.

Humphrey is also founder of thepublicrecord.com, which sourced the general public for track contributions to produce one of the largest scale collaboration albums ever produced, Tommy Lee's Methods of Mayhem album, "A Public Disservice Announcement". Scott and Tommy listened to every submission, totaling over 10,000 from all over the world to select the most suitable contributions to be edited into the existing stems. The public contributors for each track are given mention for their submissions by name in the cd sleeve credits.

In Mötley Crüe's autobiography The Dirt: Confessions of the World's Most Notorious Rock Band, Crüe guitar player Mick Mars accused Humphrey of dividing the band and subverting his musical input during the Generation Swine sessions. Other band members blamed Humphrey for the chaotic nature of the sessions and the scattershot musical directions the band was taking. Although Tommy Lee has continued to work with Humphrey on all of his solo projects, Mötley Crüe have never collaborated with him again.

== Discography ==
=== Albums ===
- Triumph – The Sport of Kings (1986) Keyboards
- Lee Aaron – Bodyrock (1989) Drum and Bass Programming
- Julian Lennon – Help Yourself (1991) Keyboards, Programming
- Robin Zander – Robin Zander (1993) Keyboards, Synthesizer
- The Melvins – Stoner Witch (1994) Programming
- The Cult – The Cult (1994) Keyboards, Programming
- Mötley Crüe – Generation Swine (1997) Co-Producer, Synthesizer, Computer programming, Backing vocals, Co-Writer
- Rob Zombie – Hellbilly Deluxe (1998) Co-Producer, Co-Writer, Programming
- Methods of Mayhem – Methods of Mayhem (1999) Co-Producer
- Rob Zombie – American Made Music to Strip By (1999) Producer
- Powerman 5000 – Tonight the Stars Revolt! (1999) Programming, Mixing
- Rob Zombie – The Sinister Urge (2001) Co-Producer, Co-Writer, Programming, Additional guitar
- Tommy Lee – Never a Dull Moment (2001) Co-Producer
- *NSYNC – No Strings Attached (October 2002) Engineer
- Andrew W.K. – The Wolf (2003) Co-Producer, Mixing
- Spineshank – Self-Destructive Pattern (2003) Engineer
- Rob Zombie – Past, Present & Future (2003) Producer, Programming, Engineer, Mixing, Co-Writer
- Element Eighty – Element Eighty (2003) Producer, Mixing
- Day of Fire – Day of Fire (2004) Producer, Mixing
- Sôber – Reddo (2004) Mixing
- Monster Magnet – Monolithic Baby! (2004) Mixing, Co-Producer
- Jack's Mannequin – Everything In Transit (2005) Drum Engineering
- Rob Zombie – Educated Horses (2006) Co-Producer, Co-Writer, Additional guitar, Additional bass, Background vocals
- Tommy Lee – Tommyland: The Ride (2006) Co-Producer, Mixing, Guitar, Keyboards
- Rob Zombie – Zombie Live (2007) Co-Producer
- Fuel – Angels & Devils (2007) Co-Producer
- Genitorturers – Blackheart Revolution (2009) Co-Producer
- Methods of Mayhem – A Public Disservice Announcement (2010) Co-Producer, Synthesizer, Piano, Backing vocals, Co-writer

=== Songs ===
- Nine Inch Nails – "Closer (Internal)" from Closer to God (EP) (1994) Remixing
- Nine Inch Nails – "Closer (Further Away)" from Closer to God (EP) (1994) Remixing
- Ozzy Osbourne – "Facing Hell" from Down to Earth (2001) Co-Writer
- Rob Zombie – "Blitzkrieg Bop" from We're a Happy Family: A Tribute to Ramones (2003) Co-Producer
- BT – "Superfabulous (Scott Humphrey Radio Mix)" from The Technology EP (2004) Remixing
- Thousand Foot Krutch – "Everyone Like Me" from Set It Off (2004) Producer

=== Film scores ===
- House of 1000 Corpses (2003) Co-composer
