= Mondo Sex Head =

Remix album by Rob Zombie
- Released: August 6, 2012
- Genre: Industrial; heavy metal
- Length: 56:57
- Label: Geffen
- Producer: Jason Bentley

Rob Zombie chronology
Hellbilly Deluxe 2 (2010)	Mondo Sex Head (2012)	Venomous Rat Regeneration Vendor (2013)

Singles from Mondo Sex Head
- 1. "Thunder Kiss '65 (JDevil remix)" Released: July 2012

Audio
- "Album" playlist on YouTube

Professional ratings
Review scores
Source	Rating
AllMusic	3.5/5 stars
Punknews.org	2/5 stars

Mondo Sex Head is the second remix album by American singer Rob Zombie, containing remixes of the tracks of various past albums both by Zombie and his former band White Zombie. It was curated and executive produced by Jason Bentley. The original cover art depicted Zombie's wife Sheri Moon Zombie. It caused controversy and was replaced by an image of a kitten. Rob Zombie explained, "I never thought it would be a problem since it seemed tame to me... but it was. No one would carry the CD. Anything with death and violence is totally fine, but anything with sex, forget about it. So instead of censoring that cover and ruining it, I just removed the ass shot and replaced it with a pussy shot." Though the vinyl release remained unchanged with the original cover art.

Original cover art (retained on vinyl release)

== Track listing ==
No.	Title	Writer(s)	Remixed by	Length
1.	"Thunder Kiss '65 (Number of the Beast Remix)"	Rob Zombie, White Zombie	JDevil	3:50
2.	"Living Dead Girl"	Scott Humphrey, Zombie	Photek	7:02
3.	"Let It All Bleed Out"	Humphrey, Zombie	Document One	4:42
4.	"Foxy Foxy"	Humphrey, Zombie	Ki:Theory	3:45
5.	"More Human Than Human"	Zombie, White Zombie	Big Black Delta	4:06
6.	"Dragula"	Humphrey, Zombie	Crosses (credited as †††)	4:31
7.	"Pussy Liquor"	Humphrey, Zombie	Ki:Theory	3:24
8.	"The Lords of Salem"	John 5, Humphrey, Zombie	Das Kapital	7:10
9.	"Never Gonna Stop (Acid Mix)" ((Acid Mix))	Humphrey, Zombie	Drumcorps	3:27
10.	"Superbeast"	Charlie Clouser, Humphrey, Zombie	Kraddy	4:23
11.	"Devil's Hole Girls" (featuring The Jane Antonia Cornish String Quartet)	5, Zombie	Tobias Enhus	4:12
12.	"Burn (Motherfucker Mix)"	5, Zombie	The Bloody Beetroots	3:03
13.	"Mars Needs Women"	5, Zombie	Griffin Boice	3:22

=== Bonus tracks ===
Deluxe edition
No.	Title	Writer(s)	Remixed by	Length
14.	"Thunder Kiss '65"	Zombie, White Zombie	Tobacco	2:54
15.	"Never Gonna Stop (Grind Mix)"	Humphrey, Zombie	Drumcorps	2:11
16.	"Pussy Liquor" (featuring El Mariachi Sol de Mexico)	Humphrey, Zombie	Tobias Enhus	4:53
17.	"Thunder Kiss '65"	Zombie, White Zombie	Destructo	4:24
18.	"More Human Than Human / Living Dead Girl / Burn (Full Metal Machine Mega Mix)"	5, Humphrey, Zombie	Jack Dangers	8:14

Muve Music
No.	Title	Writer(s)	Remixed by	Length
14.	"Foxy Foxy" (featuring Rooftop Longhorns)	Humphrey, Zombie	Tobias Enhus	2:53

== EPs ==
Prior to the release of Mondo Sex Head, two digital-only EPs were released that featured tracks from the full-length version in addition to exclusive bonus tracks.

EP 1
No.	Title	Writer(s)	Remixed by	Length
1.	"Living Dead Girl"	Humphrey, Zombie	Photek	7:02
2.	"Dragula"	Humphrey, Zombie	Adam Freeland & Evil Nine	6:16
3.	"Burn"	5, Zombie	The Bloody Beetroots	3:03
4.	"Thunder Kiss '65"	Zombie, White Zombie	Destructo	4:24

EP 2
No.	Title	Writer(s)	Remixed by	Length
1.	"More Human Than Human"	Zombie, White Zombie	Big Black Delta	4:06
2.	"Dragula"	Humphrey, Zombie	Crosses	4:31
3.	"Never Gonna Stop"	Humphrey, Zombie	Drumcorps	3:27
4.	"The Lords of Salem"	5, Humphrey, Zombie	Das Kapital	7:10

== Music video ==
A video was created for "Dragula (+++ Remix)" but never officially released.
