= Behind the Player: Blasko =

Video by Blasko (Ozzy Osbourne)
- Released: November 1, 2008
- Length: 72:00
- Label: IMV
- Director: Leon Melas
- Producer: Ken Mayer; Sean E DeMott

Behind the Player: Blasko is an interactive music video featuring Ozzy Osbourne bassist Rob "Blasko" Nicholson. Released on November 1, 2008, by IMV, the DVD features Blasko giving in-depth bass lessons for how to play "Dragula" by Rob Zombie and "I Don't Wanna Stop" by Ozzy Osbourne and an intimate behind-the scenes look at his life as a professional musician, including rare photos and video. The DVD also includes Blasko jamming the two tracks with Rob Zombie drummer Tommy Clufetos, VideoTab that shows exactly how Blasko plays his parts in the two songs, as well as other bonus material.

== Contents ==
Behind the Player

Blasko talks about his background, influences and gear, including rare photos and video

"Dragula" by Rob Zombie

- Lesson: Blasko gives an in-depth bass lesson for how to play the song
- Jam: Blasko jams the track with Rob Zombie drummer Tommy Clufetos
- VideoTab: Animated tablature shows exactly how Blasko plays the track

"I Don't Wanna Stop" by Ozzy Osbourne

- Lesson: Blasko gives an in-depth bass lesson for how to play the song
- Jam: Blasko jams the track with Rob Zombie drummer Tommy Clufetos
- VideoTab: Animated tablature shows exactly how Blasko plays the track

Special features

- Blasko Jams "American Witch" by Rob Zombie with Tommy Clufetos
- Sharon Osbourne Charity
- Little Kids Rock promotional video

== Personnel ==
- Produced by Ken Mayer & Sean E Demott
- Directed by Leon Melas
- Executive Producer: Kim Jordan & Marc Reiser
- Director of Photography: Ken Barrows
- Sound Engineer: Will Thompson
- Edited by Jeff Morose
- Sound Mix by Matt Chidgey & Cedrick Courtois
- Graphics by Thayer Demay
- Tab Transcription by Thayer Demay
- Camera Operators: Tom Gertsch, Grant Smith, Jethro Rothe-Kushal
- Gaffer: Ken Jenkins
- Assistant Director: Matt Pick
- Production Assistant: Laine Proctor
- Lighting and Grip: Mcnulty Nielson
- Artist Hospitality: Sasha Mayer
- Shot at The Chop Shop, Hollywood
- Special guest: Tommy Clufetos
- Cover photo by Johnny Indovina
- Video Courtesy of John 5, Rob Zombie, The Chop Shop
- Photos Courtesy of Neil Zlozower, Will Thompson, Shector Guitars, Johnny Indovina, The Chop Shop
