= Hellbilly Deluxe =

Studio album by Rob Zombie
- Released: August 25, 1998
- Recorded: August 1997 – June 1998
- Studio: Chop Shop (Hollywood, California)
- Genres: Industrial metal; shock rock
- Length: 38:23
- Label: Geffen
- Producers: Rob Zombie; Scott Humphrey

Rob Zombie chronology
Hellbilly Deluxe (1998)	American Made Music to Strip By (1999)

Singles from Hellbilly Deluxe
- 1. "Dragula" Released: August 24, 1998; 2. "Living Dead Girl" Released: February 16, 1999; 3. "Superbeast" Released: June 1, 1999

Audio
- "Album" playlist on YouTube

Hellbilly Deluxe: 13 Tales of Cadaverous Cavorting Inside the Spookshow International is the debut solo studio album by American musician and filmmaker Rob Zombie. The album serves as his first release outside of the band White Zombie, with whom he released four albums (two of which went multi-platinum). Hellbilly Deluxe was released on August 25, 1998, through Geffen Records. It is a concept album that portrays Zombie's love for classic horror films with heavy metal and electronic music. The album's lyrics speak of murder, chaos, and supernatural forces. The majority of Hellbilly Deluxe was recorded in California, and was produced by both Zombie and Scott Humphrey; Zombie is credited as the sole writer on all of the songs.

Hellbilly Deluxe was released to a generally positive critical reception, with the album's production being praised. The album proved to be a commercial success, reaching the top five of the Billboard 200 and selling over three million copies in the United States. Hellbilly Deluxe outsold all of Zombie's releases with his former band, and established him as a successful solo artist. The project appeared on multiple charts worldwide, though failed to duplicate the success it had in North America. Since its release, the album has garnered the title of a "shock rock classic" by numerous publications.

The album was preceded by the release of Zombie's debut single, "Dragula". The song was a hit in the United States, and appeared on the singles chart in the United Kingdom. "Living Dead Girl" was released as the album's second single, and achieved a similar amount of success as its predecessor. The album's third and final single was "Superbeast", which failed to emulate the commercial performance of the album's first two singles. All three of the songs were used extensively in the media, appearing in various films and video games. "Dragula" is often referred to as Zombie's signature song, and remains his highest selling single worldwide. Hellbilly Deluxe is Zombie's most successful album to date.

== Development ==
Zombie first rose to fame as a founding member of the heavy metal band White Zombie. The band independently released two studio albums, which failed to have commercial success but caught the attention of artists such as Kurt Cobain and Iggy Pop. The group signed with Geffen Records to release their third studio album; the project was a commercial success, selling over two million copies worldwide. Their fourth studio album had a similar success, with sales exceeding two million copies in the United States. Zombie began directing the band's music videos after the release of "More Human than Human" (1995). Zombie released his first solo recording in 1996, a collaboration with Alice Cooper titled "Hands of Death (Burn Baby Burn)". The song, recorded for Songs in the Key of X: Music from and Inspired by the X-Files, went on to receive a Grammy award nomination for Best Metal Performance at the 39th Annual Grammy Awards. The following year, he contributed the original song "The Great American Nightmare" with Howard Stern to the soundtrack for the film Private Parts (1997).

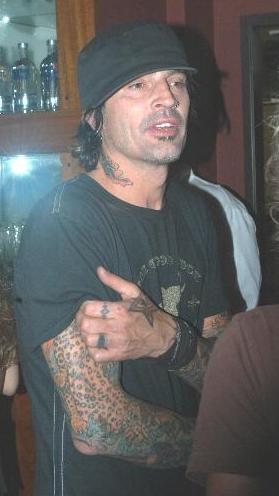
Musician Tommy Lee played drums on two of the album's songs.

This album was originally intended as a side project during development in 1997 while White Zombie as on hiatus after excessive touring. Though initially viewed as a novelty record by Geffen, Zombie worked to find a touring band to promote the album only in small venues initially. Mike Riggs was selected to play guitar, Blasko played bass guitar, and John Tempesta played the drums. Tempesta had been a member of White Zombie, while Rob was introduced to Riggs through a mutual friend. On finding the guitar player, Zombie claimed "Danny [Lohner] was just like, 'I know the perfect guy.' He gave me Riggs' phone number and I called him out of nowhere. I trusted Danny, so that was it. Riggs came out and he was great. We didn't have a bass player yet. Riggs and I hung out and talked and I told him everything I wanted to do." Work on the album began in August 1997, prior to the announcement of White Zombie's separation. The album took an estimated ten months to complete. The majority of the album was recorded at The Chop Shop in Hollywood, California. Zombie described the finished product as a "full-blown evil raging beast - a total Zombie extravaganza" and claimed that the album was "no small, self-indulgent album filled with whining about deep feelings."

Zombie was responsible for writing all of the album's songs, while he initially worked with Nine Inch Nails member Charlie Clouser to produce the album. Zombie and Clouser opted for a more "electronic" sound for the record, using various music software while working on the project. Clouser claimed "It was me and him with a computer, trying to figure out a direction we wanted to go in. We had a pretty good idea of the kind of elements that would be included and an overall concept of the segues between songs and the musical interludes. We even started coming up with the core riffs for the album." Early into the process of recording the album, Clouser became unable to work on the album due to other obligations; however, he recommended that Zombie work with Scott Humphrey for the remainder of the album. Humphrey had previously worked with artists such as Metallica prior to producing the album. Due to his departure, the only song on the album produced by Clouser is "Superbeast". Zombie stated that making the album was "weird", and he did not believe it would do well, as "most debut solo records don't."

Tommy Lee of Mötley Crüe played drums on "Meet the Creeper" and "The Ballad of Resurrection Joe and Rosa Whore". Due to various personal and legal struggles, Lee was living in the studio for a time during the recording of the album. Humphrey was a good friend of Lee's, and had previously worked with his band prior to the production of Hellbilly Deluxe. Zombie later asked Lee to appear on the album, with Lee agreeing to do so. On the collaboration, Lee stated "I went to his house after I got out of jail to stay for a while, and I think I was there about a day or two and they were working on the record downstairs and Scott and Rob were like, 'Dude, Tommy's upstairs, we should ask him to play.' And they asked me to play and I was like, 'I would love to play right now. I could really use ... you know, just kind of check out, really do some music' and I ended up playing like four tracks or so on the record." Lee is credited as the drummer for "Meet the Creeper" and "The Ballad of Resurrection Joe and Rosa Whore". "Meet the Creeper" was originally referred to as "Creature Core" prior to the release of the album. Danny Lohner provided additional guitar recordings for "Meet the Creeper". Zombie recorded a song titled "Wish It Away" for the album, though it was not included on the final product.

== Musical style ==
The project was compared to releases from White Zombie by AllMusic, who wrote that the album was "complete with thunderous industrial rhythms, drilling metal guitars, and B-movie obsessions." Entertainment Weekly noted the common usage of horror elements in the lyrics, stating Zombie had "concocted a veritable blood feast of hair-raising guitars, spine-tingling drum loops, and a cast of ghoulish characters who could be refugees from an old William Castle horror flick." Tower Records said that Hellbilly Deluxe "continue[d] to explore Zombie's fascination with psychotic noise, pummeling grooves, campy samples, and all things horrific." Legends Magazine stated that all of the songs on the album "follow the same formula of anger, sex, death, monster, demon, zombie, satanic, drug abuse kinda raw drive a tractor over your neighbor's skull kinda hate the world so I'll burn it all down music."

The album opens with "Call of the Zombie", a short introduction that features Sheri Moon Zombie reading a nursery rhyme of sorts that speaks of children hiding under their beds "for fear that the devil would chop off their heads." The ending features sound clips from the film Madhouse (1974). The introduction leads into "Superbeast". "Dragula" is the third song on the album, and is named after the vehicle DRAG-U-LA from the television series The Munsters (1964–66). The song lyrically speaks of "a Sunday drive with the Devil", according to USgamer. The song's opening line, "superstition, fear, and jealousy", is taken from the British horror film The City of the Dead (1960). It is mostly a mid-tempo song that features elements of industrial metal and alternative metal music. "Living Dead Girl" is named after the French film La Morte Vivante (1982), which roughly translates to "the living dead girl." The song opens with a musical intro taken from a trailer for the exploitation-horror film The Last House on the Left (1972). The songs intro features the line "Who is this irresistible creature who has an insatiable love for the dead?", sampled from the Italian horror film Lady Frankenstein (1971). "Living Dead Girl" has been interpreted as lyrically speaking about necrophilia. It features elements of industrial metal and has been described as "seductive and mesmerizing."

The album continues with the instrumental track "Perversion 99", a "creepy" interlude that features an "eerie exotic theme." "Demonoid Phenomenon" has been described as the "heaviest" song on the record, and makes much use of the electronic elements used for the project. The track features the lines "Don't lie to yourself, it gave you pleasure" and "You enjoyed that dead girl's body" from the horror film Daughters of Darkness (1971). "Spookshow Baby" features Zombie almost whispering the song's verses, before screaming the chorus lyrics "She's a killah! / She's a thrillah! / Spookshow baby!" The chorus to the song has been described as a "metal blitzkrieg". The song leads into "How to Make a Monster", another interlude featured on the album. The song has an "intentionally low volume and lo-fi" production, and is laced with sounds of monsters and creatures. Following "How to Make a Monster" is the song "Meet the Creeper". The track was described as a "freight train going out of control with the muted string/dropped d sound combined with more of the industrial beats." The line "The devil is in all of you!" is taken from the film Mark of the Devil (1970), while "There are more maniacs loose than one thinks" is from Daughters of Darkness (1971).

"The Ballad of Resurrection Joe and Rosa Whore" has been described as "experimental", featuring elements of techno music along with metal. "What Lurks on Channel X?" is yet another interlude, which much like the previous track makes use of techno elements; the song's samples have been described as the "forefront" of the track. The line "thirteen acres of hell" is taken from The Last House on the Left (1972). "Ladies and gentleman, I would like to make the following statement", along with the lines "the young generation, that sick generation" and "impressionable young people, brutal honesty will be shown on this screen" are all taken from The Undertaker and His Pals (1966). "Return of the Phantom Stranger" was described as "more atmospheric than most, building up tension and a sense of foreboding." Zombie's vocals on the song were compared to those of Marilyn Manson. "Return of the Phantom Stranger" features the quote "she lays there, waiting for the sacrifice" from the film The Satanic Rites of Dracula (1973). Hellbilly Deluxe closes with the final song, "The Beginning of the End". The song is an instrumental track, described as "spastic" and is said to "suggest even more bizarre things are yet to come." The track features the sound of industrial machine factory like noise layered over the music.

== Release and artwork ==
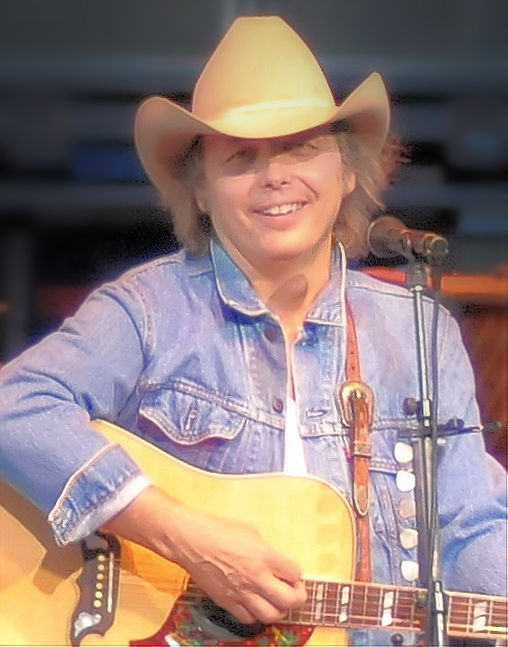
The album's title references Dwight Yoakam's Hillbilly Deluxe (1987).

Zombie first announced the album's August 25 release date in July 1998. Prior to the release of the album, numerous songs were performed by Zombie during tours throughout North America. He signed with Geffen Records to release the album; the label had previously released White Zombie's final two studio albums. The album's title is derived from Dwight Yoakam's country music album Hillbilly Deluxe (1987). The album featured a Parental Advisory label, affixed by the Recording Industry Association of America (RIAA) to identify explicit content. The album's cover art features an image of Zombie with an "x" engraved on his forehead, as well as skulls and crossbones on the side and a pentagram. Basil Gogos painted the album's artwork after being approached by Zombie. On the painting, Gogos said "Rob sent me a photograph and he described himself to me visually. He suggested some colors I could use, which was unusual for me; I like to pick my own colors. But it was helpful." Hellbilly Deluxe was officially released on compact disc (CD), LP record, Compact Cassette, and for digital download on August 25, 1998.

The album's booklet is twenty-four pages long, consisting of song lyrics and comics drawn by Zombie. Gene Colan and Dan Brereton, of Marvel Comics, contributed numerous drawings for the booklet. The booklet contains numerous images of ghosts, goblins, monsters, and other creatures. Numerous references to Lucifer and Satan are made throughout the pages, along with images of Sheri Moon and other near-nude women. Zombie had a replica of the robot from the film The Phantom Creeps (1939) created for the booklet. The replica was created by Wayne Toth, and stood ten feet tall. The creation is featured on the back of the album, as well as the single cover for "Dragula". Zombie would continue to use it for numerous live performances and appearances, including the music video for his single "Dead City Radio and the New Gods of Supertown" (2013). Zombie said of the booklet, "It's a welcome relief from the less-is-more school of thought [...] I grew up in the heyday of cool record packaging. I would stare at the record for hours. Now, you open a record and you get nothing. I always feel cheated." The disc itself is either white or yellow depending on the version, and features images of various monsters and ghouls also designed by Zombie.

The album was met with controversy upon its release when retail chain Walmart refused to carry the album unless an edited version was made. Though initially hesitant, Zombie complied with the request as "for some of these kids, it was the only place they can buy records. At the end of the day, it's these kids who are getting fucked." The edited version of the album removes the skull and crossbones, pentagram, and "x" from the album artwork; multiple pages are removed from the booklet, as are the album's lyrics. The title of "The Ballad of Resurrection Joe and Rosa Whore" was shortened to simply "The Ballad of Resurrection Joe". Seven years after the release of the album, Zombie released a deluxe edition of Hellbilly Deluxe featuring a bonus DVD. The DVD included a music video for all thirteen of the album's songs, with Zombie being credited as the director for all of them. The project was officially released on November 22, 2005.

== Critical reception ==
Professional ratings
Review scores
Source	Rating
AllMusic	4.5/5 stars
Collector's Guide to Heavy Metal	6/10
The Encyclopedia of Popular Music	4/5 stars
Entertainment Weekly	C+
Los Angeles Times	3/4 stars
NME	3/10
Pitchfork	4.7/10
Rolling Stone	3/5 stars
The Rolling Stone Album Guide	3.5/5 stars
Wall of Sound	71/100

Hellbilly Deluxe received a generally positive reception from music critics upon its initial release. Stephen Thomas Erlewine of AllMusic gave the album four and a half out of five stars, writing "For most listeners, it doesn't matter if Hellbilly Deluxe is technically a White Zombie or Rob Zombie album, since it delivers the goods, arguably even better than Astro-Creep: 2000. To outsiders, the entire schlock enterprise may seem ridiculous or sound monotonous, but even the weak cuts here hit hard and give fans exactly what they want." Billboard described the album as having a "horror carnival" theme, adding "A hard rock marathon with industrial, techno, and Gothic influences, Hellbilly Deluxe is also a showcase for visual artists." They closed the review by calling the album a "lo-tech, high-impact multimedia experience." The Los Angeles Times positively compared Hellbilly Deluxe to the works of White Zombie, claiming that "the overall sound is leaner, and the tracks are infused with the campiest elements of Zombie's B-movie obsessions." Rolling Stone praised the album, commenting "The music on Hellbilly, as usual with Zombie, is a force to be reckoned with – pulverizing hard-rock riffs propelled by drums and electronic percussion, a sonic assault that, under all the bombast, is as meticulously arranged as any Whitney Houston track."

Entertainment Weekly gave the album a mixed review, writing "It's all a little creepy, to be sure, but Zombie's cartoonish antics are too over-the-top to really get under your skin." Legends Magazine gave the album an overall positive review, though criticized Zombie's apparent lack of originality, stating "Rob is one of those performers with absolutely zero musical originality. Everything he produces sounds more or less like someone else." The reviewer went on to praise songs such as "Superbeast" and "Dragula", while citing "What Lurks on Channel X" and "Return of the Phantom Stranger" as "disappointments". Yahoo! Music wrote that the release was "an excessively heavy (the best kind), meticulously produced piece of parodic gore-flick metal. The kind of stuff that would be proud to call itself crap with a capital C."

The A.V. Club called the album a "guilty pleasure" in their mixed review, adding "When you get down to it, the samples and interludes on Zombie's solo debut, Hellbilly Deluxe, are merely window dressing for compact, overdriven, anthemic money shots like 'Superbeast', 'Demonoid Phenomenon', and 'Living Dead Girl'." In their 2010 review of the album, Bloody Disgusting wrote "Putting aside the futuristic sounds and crisp production, everything about the album screamed out vintage horror. I imagined creepy black and white laboratories where glass vials and tubes bubbled with menacing liquids. I pictured a dark night where clouds slowly moved past a full moon. I envisioned foggy forests where tree branches looked like skeleton arms. With that kind of atmosphere, the album already felt like a fine wine: aged and more enjoyable for it." They later criticized the length of the album, and claimed that some songs felt like "filler" tracks. PopStops also praised the album, writing "This is an album that rarely ever gets out of overdrive. Zombie growls his lyrics over a bed of car crash crunching guitars and pounding industrial rhythms. No surf music here."

== Commercial performance ==
On the week dated September 12, Hellbilly Deluxe debuted at number five on the Billboard 200 chart in the United States. The album sold an estimated 121,000 copies during its first week of release. The project's first week sales were noted as the highest of Zombie's career at the time, outselling the first week sales of all four White Zombie studio albums. The album fell to number twelve on the chart the following week, and to number sixteen the week after. Hellbilly Deluxe had shipped over 500,000 copies by September 29, earning it a gold certification from the Recording Industry Association of America (RIAA). It was certified platinum for sales and shipments exceeding one million copies on November 4, and earned a multi-platinum award the following April. Hellbilly Deluxe went on to spend over sixty-six weeks on the Billboard 200 album chart, making it Zombie's longest charting effort to date. The album was certified triple platinum on January 11, 2000, for shipments of three million albums. Since its release, Hellbilly Deluxe has become Zombie's most commercially successful album to date.

The album had similar chart success in Canada, where it debuted at number two on the albums chart. It spent the following nine weeks in the top ten of the albums chart, and a total of twelve weeks on the weekly chart. Hellbilly Deluxe went on to sell over 160,000 copies in the country, earning it a multi-platinum certification from Music Canada. The album debuted at number forty-eight on the ARIA Charts, before rising to a new peak of thirty-seven. It remained on the country's chart for a total of four weeks. The album spent one week on the Ö3 Austria Top 40, where it entered at number forty-two. Hellbilly Deluxe made its debut at number forty-eight on the Official New Zealand Music Chart. The album spent a total of fourteen weeks on the chart, rising to a new peak of number nineteen. The project debuted at number forty-five on the Swedish Hitlistan chart. In its second week, the project fell to number fifty-seven, before falling off the chart entirely the week after. In the United Kingdom, the album debuted and peaked at number thirty-seven on the official albums chart. Hellbilly Deluxe fell to number sixty in its second week, and ninety-eight in its third and final week on the chart. The album received a silver certification in the country on May 23, 2014, denoting sales of 60,000 copies.

== Impact ==
With the release of Hellbilly Deluxe, Zombie established himself as a successful solo artist outside of his prior band. The album itself went on to sell over three million copies worldwide, and spawned three singles that each achieved commercial success. The album's lead single, "Dragula", went on to become Zombie's most successful single to date in terms of sales and radio airplay. "Living Dead Girl" was the second single to be released from the album. Both singles became top ten hits on the Hot Mainstream Rock Tracks chart. The album's third and final single, "Superbeast", went on to receive a nomination for Best Metal Performance at the 42nd Annual Grammy Awards. Loudwire listed "Meet the Creeper", "Superbeast", "Living Dead Girl", and "Dragula" on their list of Zombie's ten best songs. The same post claimed that "Dragula" "introduced the world to Rob Zombie's unique sound as a solo artist and is one of his most recognizable songs." The album was listed at number nineteen on Loudwire's list of best debut hard rock albums. The production techniques used for Helbilly Deluxe were praised by critics, with Premier Guitar writing in 2010 that "Humphrey had pushed the boundaries of primitive DAW and was instrumental in the development of Pro Tools features like Beat Detective and batch cross fade processing. So that same inventive mentality went into Hellbillys' production." Hellbilly Deluxe was ranked among the top two-hundred selling albums in the United States in both 1998 and 1999.

Due in part to the success of Hellbilly Deluxe, Zombie released American Made Music to Strip By in October 1999. The album was composed solely of remixes of songs featured on Hellbilly Deluxe, featuring contributions from Charlie Clouser and Rammstein, among others. The album was a commercial success in the United States, entering the top forty of the Billboard 200. In 2010, Zombie announced that his fourth studio album would be titled Hellbilly Deluxe 2: Noble Jackals, Penny Dreadfuls and the Systematic Dehumanization of Cool (2010). When asked about the album's title, Zombie was quoted as stating "Well, it was around the ten-year anniversary of the first record, and the idea just popped into my head. It really wasn't this big master plan by any means, I just knew I wanted to return to the old ways of doing things, and I thought that that would be a good starting point." Songs taken from Hellbilly Deluxe were featured in Zombie's retrospective album Past, Present & Future (2003). The album featured songs from both Zombie's work with White Zombie as well as his solo career, along with some new material. Songs from Hellbilly Deluxe would later appear in Zombie's greatest hits collections The Best of Rob Zombie: 20th Century Masters The Millennium Collection (2006) and Icon (2010). Zombie has included songs taken from the album on all of his subsequent tours, including his Hellbilly Deluxe 2 World Tour (2009–12). The music found on the album has been used extensively in the media, including films, video games, and television. "Dragula" and "Superbeast" have been covered by acts such as Motionless in White and Suicide Silence, respectively. The songs "Superbeast", "Dragula", "Living Dead Girl", "Meet the Creeper", "How to Make a Monster", and "Demonoid Phenomenon" were all covered on the tribute album The Electro-Industrial Tribute to Rob Zombie (2002).

The album is rated R16 in New Zealand for violence, offensive language and sex scenes.

== Track listing ==
All lyrics written by Rob Zombie; all music composed by Rob Zombie & Scott Humphrey.

No.	Title	Producer(s)	Length
1.	"Call of the Zombie"	Scott Humphrey; Zombie	0:30
2.	"Superbeast"	Humphrey; Zombie; Charlie Clouser	3:40
3.	"Dragula"	Humphrey; Zombie	3:42
4.	"Living Dead Girl"	Humphrey; Zombie	3:21
5.	"Perversion 99"	Humphrey; Zombie	1:43
6.	"Demonoid Phenomenon"	Humphrey; Zombie	4:11
7.	"Spookshow Baby"	Humphrey; Zombie	3:38
8.	"How to Make a Monster"	Humphrey; Zombie	1:38
9.	"Meet the Creeper"	Humphrey; Zombie	3:13
10.	"The Ballad of Resurrection Joe and Rosa Whore"	Humphrey; Zombie	3:55
11.	"What Lurks on Channel X?"	Humphrey; Zombie	2:29
12.	"Return of the Phantom Stranger"	Humphrey; Zombie	4:32
13.	"The Beginning of the End"	Humphrey; Zombie	1:52
Total length:			38:23

== Personnel ==
Credits adapted from the album's liner notes.

- Rob Zombie – vocals, lyrics, producer, music, production, all other art, additional photos, art direction
- Riggs – guitars
- Blasko – bass
- Tempesta – drums
- Danny Lohner – additional guitars & bass
- Mark Matcho – additional guitars & bass
- Tommy Lee – drums on "Meet the Creeper" and "The Ballad of Resurrection Joe and Rosa Whore"
- Scott Humphrey – music, producer, mixing, engineering, programming
- Chris Lord-Alge – additional mixing
- Frank Gryner – additional engineering
- Paul DeCarli – additional programming
- Tom Baker – mastering
- Basil Gogos – cover art
- Dan "The Man" Brereton – 1313 painting
- Gene "The Mean Machine" Colan – comic pages
- Kitty Moon – living dead girl
- Norman Cabrera – monster manipulations
- Myriam Santos-Kayda – photography
- Chapman Baehler – additional photos
- Nika/Lucky Ninja House of Graphics – art direction
- Andy Gould/Jodie Wilson – management
- John Dittmar – booking
- Jeffrey Light – legal affairs
- Scott Adair – business affairs
- Ray Farrell – A&R

== Charts ==
=== Weekly charts ===
Chart (1998)	Peak position
Australian Albums (ARIA)	37
Austrian Albums (Ö3 Austria)	42
Canadian Albums (Billboard)	2
New Zealand Albums (RMNZ)	19
Scottish Albums (Official Charts)	65
Swedish Albums (Sverigetopplistan)	45
UK Albums (Official Charts)	37
US Billboard 200	5

=== Year-end charts ===
Chart (1998)	Position
US Billboard 200	103
Chart (1999)	Position
US Billboard 200	53

== Certifications ==
Region	Certification	Certified units/sales
Canada (Music Canada)	2× Platinum	200,000^{^}
United Kingdom (BPI)	Gold	100,000^{‡}
United States (RIAA)	3× Platinum	3,000,000^{^}
^{^} Shipments figures based on certification alone.^{‡} Sales+streaming figures based on certification alone.
