= The Electro-Industrial Tribute to Rob Zombie =

Compilation album by Various artists
- Released: August 13, 2002
- Recorded: 2002
- Genre: Heavy metal
- Length: 38:07
- Label: Vitamin
- Producer: Jim Doyle; Myke Smith

Professional ratings
Review scores
Source	Rating
Allmusic	2/5 stars

The Electro-Industrial Tribute to Rob Zombie is a tribute album completely dedicated to heavy metal musician Rob Zombie. It contains the original song "Dealt With" inspired by Rob Zombie's music.

== Track listing ==
1. "Meet the Creeper" - 2:55 (Private Benjamin)
2. "Superbeast" - 3:56 (Transient)
3. "House of 1000 Corpses" - 4:15 (Skoink)
4. "How to Make a Monster" - 3:21 (Sinus Giddy)
5. "Dragula" - 4:55 (Mitchell Sigman)
6. "More Human than Human" - 3:43 (Transient)
7. "Living Dead Girl" - 3:29 (Sinus Giddy)
8. "Demonoid Phenomenon" - 4:04 (Motor Industries)
9. "Iron Head" - 3:25 (Skoink)
10. "Dealt With (Original Composition)" - 4:00 (Enemy of Evil)
