= American Made Music to Strip By =

Remix album by Rob Zombie
- Released: October 26, 1999
- Recorded: 1999
- Length: 51:39
- Label: Geffen
- Producer: Scott Humphrey

Rob Zombie chronology
Hellbilly Deluxe (1998)	American Made Music to Strip By (1999)	The Sinister Urge (2001)

Audio
- "Album" playlist on YouTube

American Made Music to Strip By is the first remix album released by American musician Rob Zombie. The album was released through Geffen Records on October 26, 1999. It is composed entirely of remixes of songs taken from Zombie's debut studio album, Hellbilly Deluxe (1998). Zombie worked with a number of musicians and producers to create updated versions of the songs, including Charlie Clouser, who had previously worked with Zombie on his debut solo effort. Ten of the original album's songs have been remixed, excluding three instrumental interludes. Two of the remixes featured on American Made Music to Strip By had previously been released on promotional discs for "Dragula" (1998) and "Living Dead Girl" (1999).

Upon its release, American Made Music to Strip By was met with a mixed critical reception. Though some tracks received praise for their updated sound, others were seen as simply redundant or predictable. The project received minimal promotion leading to its release, and debuted at number thirty-eight on the Billboard 200 chart in the United States. American Made Music to Strip By has gone on to sell over 300,000 copies worldwide since its initial release. The album was followed by the promotional vinyl Spookshow Baby Remix-a-Go-Go, released on November 30, 1999. The vinyl release featured five remixes, four of which were included on American Made Music to Strip By and one new remix of "Spookshow Baby".

== Background ==
Rob Zombie first rose to fame as the vocalist for heavy metal band White Zombie. With the band, Zombie released four studio albums, two of which earned multi-platinum status in the United States. Zombie released his first solo recording in 1996, earning a Grammy Award nomination for the effort. Work on Zombie's debut studio album was announced in 1998. Zombie wrote all of the material for Hellbilly Deluxe, and worked with producer Scott Humphrey for the album's production work. Hellbilly Deluxe was released on August 25, 1998. The album was met with a generally positive critical reception, and went on to gain the title of a "shock rock classic" in later years. Hellbilly Deluxe was a commercial success, going on to sell over three million copies worldwide and earning record certifications in Canada, the United Kingdom, and the United States. The release spawned three singles, all of which received extensive radio airplay upon release. Both "Dragula" and "Living Dead Girl" entered the top ten of the Hot Mainstream Rock Tracks chart, while "Superbeast" earned a nomination for Best Metal Performance at the 42nd Annual Grammy Awards. Since its release, Hellbilly Deluxe has been regarded as Zombie's most successful album both critically and commercially.

Charlie Clouser was confirmed to be working on remixes for three of the album's songs in September 1999; Clouser had previously worked with Zombie on early recording sessions for Hellbilly Deluxe, and is credited as producer on the song "Superbeast". The same article reported that Chris Vrenna had been brought on to remix "Return of the Phantom Stranger". On September 24, it was reported that Jeff Turzo of God Lives Underwater had worked on a new remix for Rob Zombie. MTV reported on September 29 that Zombie had begun mastering an upcoming remix album that consisted of songs from his debut solo effort. The article confirmed the track listing for the album, and revealed that Zombie had filmed a music video for Clouser's remix of "Superbeast". Despite this announcement, a music video for the remix was not released. The "Si Non Oscillas, Noli Tintinnare Mix" of "Dragula" had previously been released under the title "Hot Rod Herman Remix", and had appeared on the soundtrack The Matrix: Music from the Motion Picture (1999). The remix also appeared on promotional releases for "Dragula" upon its initial release as a single. Similarly, the "Subliminal Seduction Mix" of "Living Dead Girl" had appeared as the "Naked Exorcism Mix" on promotional releases for the single.

== Release and artwork ==
American Made Music to Strip By was released on Compact disc (CD), LP record, Compact Cassette, and for digital download on October 26, 1999. Little promotion was put forth prior to the release of the project. The album served as Zombie's second release through Geffen Records as a solo artist. Much like its parent album, American Made Music to Strip By featured a Parental Advisory label, affixed by the Recording Industry Association of America (RIAA) to identify explicit content. Despite the album receiving the label, the only song to feature explicit lyrics is "The Ballad of Resurrection Joe and Rosa Whore". The cover art features Zombie's then-girlfriend (and now wife) Sheri Moon tinted in green and naked except for a cowboy hat and a pair of high heels. The album's booklet consisted of twenty-eight pages, features images of a "scantily-clad" Sheri Moon along with tour photos and original artwork by Zombie, while the back cover depicts Moon naked again except this time without the cowboy hat, instead wearing the heels and a pair long black gloves on her arms, covering her breasts and crotch. Zombie filmed a new music video for the "Subliminal Seduction Mix" of "Living Dead Girl", which had previously received an official single release earlier that year. The new video features the same setting as the original, though sees Zombie and his band performing the song while dressed as mummies. Sheri Moon, who portrayed the living dead girl in the original video, does not appear in the remixed edition. The Spookshow Baby Remix-a-Go-Go promotional LP was released on November 30, 1999. The album consists of five remix, four of which had previously appeared on American Made Music to Strip By. The fifth and final remix was an additional remix of "Spookshow Baby". The vinyl release has since gone out of print, though is available through third-party sellers online. A clean version of the album was released as well, with the title American Made Music and alternate artwork that featured a digitally-imposed leopard-print bikini on Sheri Moon.

== Critical reception ==
Professional ratings
Review scores
Source	Rating
AllMusic	3/5 stars
Collector's Guide to Heavy Metal	1/10
The Encyclopedia of Popular Music	3/5 stars
Legends Magazine	(favorable)
Metal Hammer	7/10
NME	1/10
Rolling Stone	2/5 stars
The Rolling Stone Album Guide	2/5 stars
Yahoo! Music	(unfavorable)

Upon its initial release, American Made Music to Strip By was met with a mixed critical reception. Heather Phares of AllMusic gave the album three out of five stars, and wrote "The sexy, sleazy, horror-movie vibe of Hellbilly Deluxe is amplified on a remix of 'What Lurks on Channel X?' by the Spacetruckers, Rammstein's reworking of 'Spookshow Baby,' and the "Poly 915" remix of 'Demonoid Phenomenon.' Clouser turns in revamped versions of 'Superbeast,' 'Dragula,' and 'Living Dead Girl' that expand on the songs' creepy yet hard-hitting feel." Rob O'Connor of Yahoo! Music praised the album's artwork and booklet, though criticized the album by writing "Besides, if Mr. Zombie is so hands-on about his artistic statements, then how can he stand the idea of having all these other klutzes messing with his sound?"

Rolling Stone gave the album two stars. The article claimed "Charlie Clouser's versions of 'Dragula' and 'Living Dead Girl' liberate Zombie's music from the verse-chorus-verse structure, giving the songs an eerier, more-consuming edge", though later added "many of these remixes are like one sequel too many to a horror film - the same predictable elements simply rearranged." Legends Magazine gave the album a strong review, stating "Every song on this disk is superb. Any song that sucked on Hellbilly [Deluxe] is now re-built and vastly improved - proof that you can shine poop. The previously disappointing 'How to Make a Monster', which was mixed to almost inaudible levels on Hellbilly [Deluxe], has been resurrected and repackaged by God Lives Underwater into a sleazy-swank, KMFDM-esque dance-floor romp." In their review of the album, NME gave the album one out of ten stars, going on to say "Just another greedy ruse in metal's lucrative electronic revolution? Oh yes. But it's the incestuous choice of remixers that really makes it such an exercise in futility."

== Commercial performance ==
On the week ending November 13, American Made Music to Strip By debuted at number thirty-eight on the Billboard 200 chart in the United States. The first week sales for the project were not released by Nielsen SoundScan. The album fell to number sixty-three in its second week, and fell once more to ninety-nine the following week. American Made Music to Strip By fell to number one hundred thirty-one in its fourth charting week. The album was number one hundred eighty-eight (188) in its fifth week, and fell off the chart the following week. The album re-entered the charts for the week ending January 15, 2000, charting at number one hundred and sixty-seven (167) for the week; it fell off the chart the week after. American Made Music to Strip By had sold an estimated 234,631 copies in the United States as of June 2000. In Canada, the album failed to appear on the official albums chart in the country. Despite this, American Made Music to Strip By received a gold certification from Music Canada, denoting sales of 40,000 copies. The album entered the official albums chart in the United Kingdom at number one hundred seventy-nine.

== Track listing ==
Standard edition
No.	Title	Writer(s)	Producer(s)	Length
1.	"Dragula" (Si Non Oscillas, Noli Tintinnare Mix^{[c]})	Rob Zombie, Scott Humphrey	Scott Humphrey*Zombie*Charlie Clouser^{[a]}	4:37
2.	"Superbeast" (Porno Holocaust Mix)	Rob Zombie, Scott Humphrey	Humphrey*Zombie*Clouser*Oliver Adams^{[a]}*Praga Khan^{[a]}	3:58
3.	"How to Make a Monster" (Kitty's Purrrrformance Mix)	Rob Zombie, Scott Humphrey	Humphrey*Zombie*God Lives Underwater^{[a]}	4:02
4.	"Living Dead Girl" (Subliminal Seduction Mix^{[d]})	Rob Zombie, Scott Humphrey	Humphrey*Zombie*Clouser^{[a]}	4:09
5.	"Spookshow Baby" (Black Leather Cat Suit Mix)	Rob Zombie, Scott Humphrey	Humphrey*Zombie*Rammstein^{[a]}	4:35
6.	"Demonoid Phenomenon" (Sin Lives Mix)	Rob Zombie, Scott Humphrey	Humphrey*Zombie*Poly 915^{[a]}	4:36
7.	"The Ballad of Resurrection Joe and Rosa Whore" (Ilsa She-Wolf of Hollywood Mix)	Rob Zombie, Scott Humphrey	Humphrey*Zombie*Philip Steir^{[a]}	5:38
8.	"What Lurks on Channel X?" (XXX Mix)	Rob Zombie, Scott Humphrey	Humphrey*Zombie*Spacetruckers^{[a]}	4:07
9.	"Meet the Creeper" (Pink Pussy Mix)	Rob Zombie, Scott Humphrey	Humphrey*Zombie*Danny Lohner*Steve Duda^{[a]}	4:47
10.	"Return of the Phantom Stranger" (Tuesday Night at the Chop Shop Mix)	Rob Zombie, Scott Humphrey	Humphrey*Zombie*Chris Vrenna^{[a]}	3:32
11.	"Superbeast" (Girl on a Motorcycle Mix)	Rob Zombie, Scott Humphrey	Humphrey*Zombie*Clouser^{[b]}	3:49
12.	"Meet the Creeper" (Brute Man & Wonder Girl Mix)	Rob Zombie, Scott Humphrey	Humphrey*Zombie*DJ Lethal^{[a]}	3:45
Total length:				51:39

Spookshow Baby Remix-a-Go-Go promotional LP
No.	Title	Writer(s)	Producer(s)	Length
1.	"Spookshow Baby" (Super Ultra-Deluxe Mix)	Rob Zombie, Scott Humphrey	Scott Humphrey*Zombie*Dub Pistols^{[a]}	5:40
2.	"Dragula" (Si Non Oscillas, Noli Tintinnare Mix^{[c]})	Rob Zombie, Scott Humphrey	Humphrey*Zombie*Charlie Clouser^{[a]}	4:28
3.	"How to Make a Monster" (Kitty's Purrrrformance Mix)	Rob Zombie, Scott Humphrey	Humphrey*Zombie*God Lives Underwater^{[a]}	4:07
4.	"Spookshow Baby" (Black Leather Cat Suit Mix)	Rob Zombie, Scott Humphrey	Humphrey*Zombie*Rammstein^{[a]}	4:42
5.	"What Lurks on Channel X?" (XXX Mix)	Rob Zombie, Scott Humphrey	Humphrey*Zombie*Spacetruckers^{[a]}	4:14
Total length:				23:11

Notes

- ^{^a} signifies a remixer and additional producer
- ^{^b} Clouser produced both the original "Superbeast" and the remix.
- ^{^c}Also known as Hot Rod Herman Mix, name used in the Matrix soundtrack
- ^{^d}Also known as Naked Exorcism Mix, name used in The Crow: Salvation soundtrack and in the single of the album version of the song (the single also featured another remix done by D.O.S.E.)

== Personnel ==
=== Rob Zombie ===
- Rob Zombie - vocals
- Riggs - guitars
- Blasko - bass
- Tempesta - drums

=== Production ===
- Rob Zombie - production, lyrics, art direction
- Scott Humphrey - production
- Frank Gryner - additional engineering on tracks 6 & 9

== Charts ==
=== Weekly charts ===
Chart (1999)	Peak position
UK Albums (OCC)	179
US Billboard 200	38

== Certifications ==
Region	Certification	Certified units/sales
Canada (Music Canada)	Gold	50,000^{^}
^{^} Shipments figures based on certification alone.
