= Super-Charger Heaven =

Single by White Zombie

from the album Astro-Creep: 2000
- B-side: "Where the Side Walk Ends, the Bug Parade Begins"
- Released: 1996
- Recorded: 1995 at NRG Studios, Los Angeles
- Length: 3:37
- Label: Geffen
- Songwriters: Rob Zombie, White Zombie
- Producer: Terry Date

White Zombie singles chronology
"Electric Head, Pt. 2 (The Ecstasy)" (1995)	"Super-Charger Heaven" (1996)

Astro-Creep: 2000 track listing
- 1. "Electric Head Pt. 1 (The Agony)"; 2. "Super-Charger Heaven"; 3. "Real Solution #9"; 4. "Creature of the Wheel"; 5. "Electric Head Pt. 2 (The Ecstasy)"; 6. "Grease Paint and Monkey Brains"; 7. "I, Zombie"; 8. "More Human than Human"; 9. "El Phantasmo and the Chicken-Run Blast-O-Rama"; 10. "Blur the Technicolor"; 11. "Blood, Milk and Sky"

Audio
- "Super-Charger Heaven" on YouTube

"Super-Charger Heaven" is the third and final single off White Zombie's 1995 studio album, Astro-Creep: 2000. The song can also be found on Rob Zombie's Past, Present & Future, the greatest hits album The Best of Rob Zombie, and a remix can be found on Supersexy Swingin' Sounds. The artwork for the single incorporates the Japanese superhero Devilman, who is also referenced in the chorus of the song.

== Music and lyrics ==
Like many White Zombie songs, the song contains clips from old horror films. The song opens with spoken words: "Look, I know the supernatural is something that isn't supposed to happen, but it does happen", a sample from the 1963 film The Haunting.

The song contains a section of spoken Latin, from the 1976 horror film To the Devil a Daughter. The Latin states: Insipiens in corde suo, non est deus. Non est qui faciat bonum, non est usque ad unum. Es excommunicatus, ex unione fidelium. ("The fool (hath said) in his heart, There is no God. There is none that doeth good, no, not one. Thou art excommunicated from the union of the faithful.") The first two sentences of the Latin passage are quotations from Psalm 53.

Another line from the same film, "It is not heresy, and I will not recant!", is also spoken by actor Christopher Lee and sampled in "Super-Charger Heaven".

The lyrics contain the line "Bury me an angel,/God, I need some inspiration", a reference to the 1971 film Bury Me an Angel. The song also includes the line "ring-a-ding rhythm", which was a film about jazz by Amicus Films.

== Music video ==
The music video, the third music video made for a song off the album, features the band playing live on stage at California, Las Vegas, and Detroit. Alice Cooper joins the band on stage for a few brief seconds during the video.

== Appearances ==
- It is featured in the 1995 action movie Judge Dredd, starring Sylvester Stallone.
- It is featured in the 1996 Nicolas Winding Refn's neo-noir crime drama Pusher.
- It is featured in the freestyle motocross movie 'Crusty Demons of Dirt'.
- It is used in the Daria episode "Ill".
- It is used in numerous promos for the Ocean dub of Dragon Ball Z for Cartoon Network in the mid-1990s.
- in 2001 the staff of KBPI in Denver, CO produced a parody titled "Bronco Fan".

== First single track listing ==
1. "Super-Charger Heaven (LP version)" - 3:37
2. "Where the Side Walk Ends, the Bug Parade Begins" - 2:41

== Second single track listing ==
1. "Super-Charger Heaven (LP Version)" - 3:37
2. "El Phantasmo and the Chicken-Run Blast-O-Rama (LP version)" - 4:13
3. "More Human than Human (Princess of Helium Ultra Mix)" - 4:17

== Charts ==
Chart (1996)	Peak position
US Mainstream Rock Tracks (Billboard)	39
