= Not Going Away =

Single by Ozzy Osbourne

from the album Black Rain
- Released: July 11, 2007
- Recorded: 2006
- Genre: Heavy metal
- Length: 4:32
- Label: Epic
- Songwriter(s): Ozzy Osbourne; Zakk Wylde; Kevin Churko
- Producer(s): Kevin Churko

Ozzy Osbourne singles chronology
"I Don't Wanna Stop" (2007)	"Not Going Away" (2007)	"Black Rain" (2007)

"Not Going Away" is the second single released from Ozzy Osbourne's 2007 album Black Rain. The single peaked at number 14 on Billboard's Hot Mainstream Rock Tracks. The song is about Ozzy saying that he wants to perform until he is physically unable to continue, and telling all his doubters that he is "Not Going Away".

The song was performed live at the 2007 Scream Awards by Ozzy Osbourne and others, including Rob Zombie.

== Personnel ==
- Ozzy Osbourne - vocals
- Zakk Wylde - guitar
- Rob "Blasko" Nicholson - bass
- Mike Bordin - drums
