= Superbeast =

Single by Rob Zombie

from the album Hellbilly Deluxe
- Released: June 1, 1999
- Recorded: 1998
- Studio: Chop Shop, Hollywood, California
- Genre: Industrial metal; groove metal; shock rock
- Length: 3:40
- Label: Geffen
- Songwriters: Rob Zombie, Charlie Clouser, Scott Humphrey
- Producers: Rob Zombie, Scott Humphrey

Rob Zombie singles chronology
"Living Dead Girl" (1999)	"Superbeast" (1999)	"Scum of the Earth" (2000)

"Superbeast" is a song by Rob Zombie, released as the third single from his solo debut, Hellbilly Deluxe. The song was co-written by Charlie Clouser, formerly of Nine Inch Nails. It also appears on Rob Zombie's Past, Present & Future, the greatest hits album The Best of Rob Zombie, and two remixes are contained on American Made Music to Strip By.

The song was covered by Transient for The Electro-Industrial Tribute to Rob Zombie in 2002 and was covered again in 2011 by Suicide Silence for the digital edition of The Black Crown.

== Music video ==
The music video shows a woman, Sheri Moon (Rob's wife), dressed in leather and riding on a motorcycle, fighting a robot and a ninja with katanas while bright lights rapidly flash on screen. There are also a few clips added of Zombie and his band.

== Other media ==
The track appeared in the horror film Valentine in 2001 and the action/horror film End of Days in 1999. The song was played in the background of the trailer of Godzilla 2000: Millennium. The "Girl on a Motorcycle" remix of the song was frequently used in commercials for ECW T-shirts and future events. The song was nominated for the Grammy Award for Best Metal Performance in 2000. On January 4, 2008, the song "Superbeast" was used to introduce the "Abyss vs. Manabu Nakanishi" match at Wrestle Kingdom II in Tokyo, Japan.

The studio version of the song appears on the 1998 vehicular combat game Twisted Metal III. An exclusive remix version appears on the 1999 sequel Twisted Metal 4, while the intro to the "Girl on a Motorcycle" remix appears on the ending of Mr. Zombie's campaign. In 2000, the song appeared in the North American PlayStation One version from the survival horror game Nightmare Creatures II. In 2009, the song also appeared in the action-adventure game Brütal Legend and was available for download as a playable track in the rhythm game Rock Band.

== Personnel ==
=== Rob Zombie ===
- Rob Zombie - vocals
- Riggs - guitar
- Blasko - bass
- Tempesta - drums

=== Production ===
- Tom Baker - mastering
- Paul DeCarli - additional programming
- Frank Gryner - additional engineering
- Scott Humphrey - production, engineering, mixing, programming
- Chris Lord-Alge - additional mixing
- Rob Zombie - lyrics, production, artwork

== Charts ==
Chart (1999)	Peak position
US Mainstream Rock (Billboard)	26
