= Charlie Clouser =

American musician

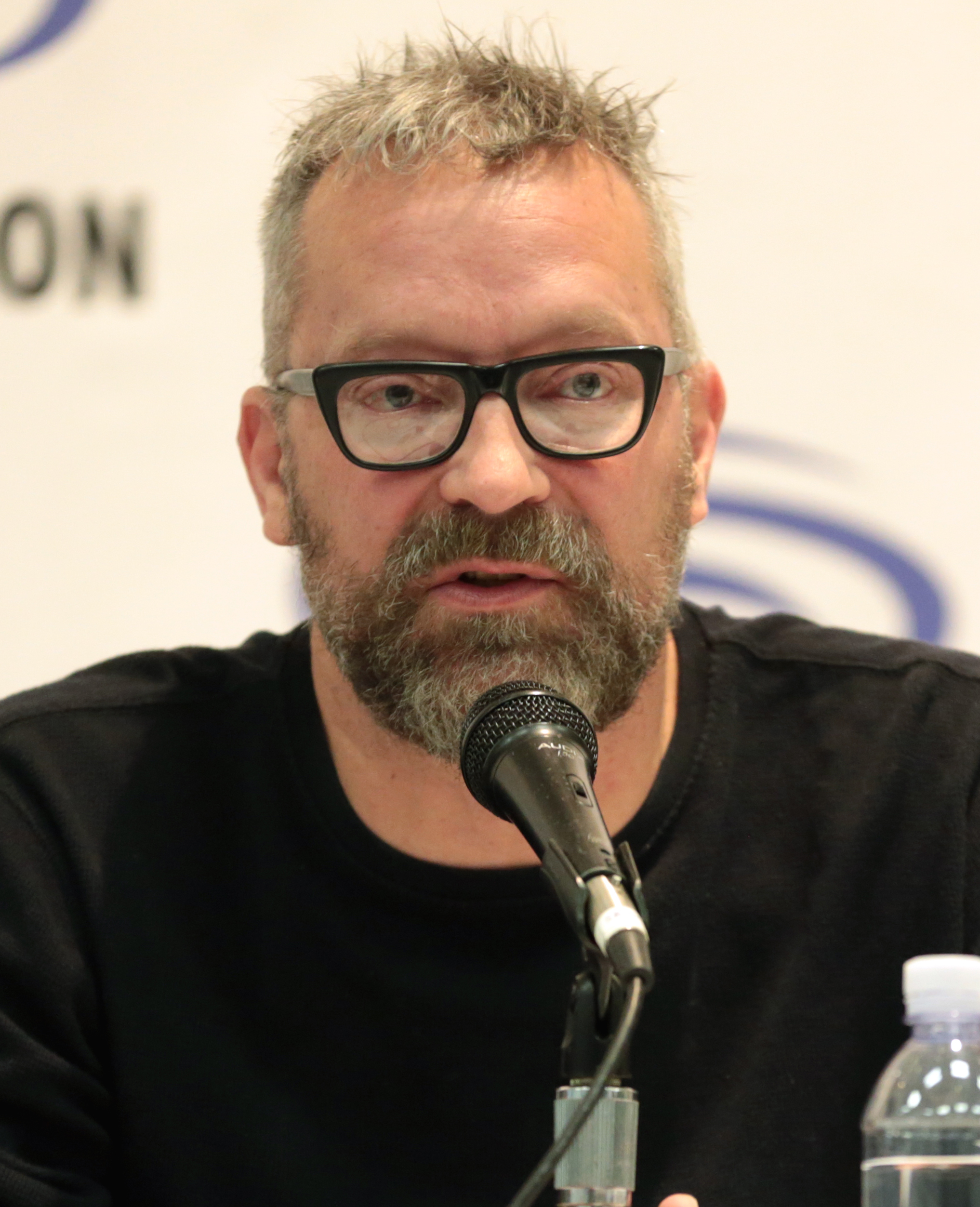
- Clouser at the 2017 WonderCon

Background information
- Born: Charles Alexander Clouser; June 28, 1963 (age 63)
- Origin: Hanover, New Hampshire, United States
- Genres: Industrial metal; electronica; alternative rock; trip hop; film score
- Occupations: Musician; composer; record producer; remixer
- Instrument: Keyboards
- Formerly of: Nine Inch Nails; Burning Retna

Charles Alexander Clouser (born June 28, 1963) is an American keyboardist, composer, record producer, and remixer. He worked with Trent Reznor for Nine Inch Nails from 1994 to 2000, and is a composer for film and television; among his credits are the score for the Saw franchise and American Horror Story. Clouser was nominated for two Grammy Awards for Best Metal Performance in 1997.

== Early life ==
Clouser was born in Hanover, New Hampshire; his father, K. Danner Clouser (1930–2000), was a professor at Dartmouth College and Pennsylvania State University. He attended Middletown High School in Pennsylvania and graduated from Hanover High School in 1981. He is also a graduate of Hampshire College in Amherst, Massachusetts; he earned a degree in electronic music in 1985.

== Career ==
Clouser plays keyboard, synthesizer, theremin, and drums. He also does music programming, engineering, and mixing. He co-worked with Trent Reznor of Nine Inch Nails (1994–2000) for several projects. Before he worked with Nine Inch Nails, he was in the alternative band Burning Retna with former L.A. Guns guitarist Mick Cripps and fellow Nothing Records employee Sean Beavan. Clouser also was a member of the band 9 Ways to Sunday, which released a self-titled album in 1990. Clouser has remixed artists such as Nine Inch Nails, Marilyn Manson, White Zombie, Rammstein and Meat Beat Manifesto.

In 2004, Clouser produced the Helmet album Size Matters. Consisting mainly of collaborations between Clouser and Page Hamilton, it was intended to be a Hamilton solo album. The first release from the collaboration, known as "Throwing Punches", appeared on a soundtrack in 2003 for the film Underworld, and was credited as a Hamilton track. Clouser created one of FirstCom music's master series discs, only sold for commercial use, in the late 1990s.

Two songs programmed by Clouser were nominated for Grammy Awards in 1997: White Zombie's "I'm Your Boogie Man" and Rob Zombie and Alice Cooper's "Hands of Death (Burn Baby Burn)", the latter of which Clouser also co-wrote and mixed.

He worked with Trent Reznor on the soundtrack of Natural Born Killers (1994), helping record and produce a new version of "Something I Can Never Have," the original version of which appeared on Nine Inch Nails' 1989 album Pretty Hate Machine. Clouser's remix of Zombie's "Dragula" can be found on The Matrix soundtrack. Another Zombie track remixed by Clouser, "Reload", appears on The Matrix Reloaded soundtrack. He produced the unfinished Hamilton project Gandhi. In 2001, Clouser formed the supergroup Revenge of the Triads with Jason Slater and Troy Van Leeuwen, although they later disbanded in 2002 without releasing any material.

Clouser provided the live synth for Alec Empire's "Intelligence And Sacrifice" tour in 2001. He appears in the Moog documentary about electronic-music pioneer Robert Moog and composed the song "I Am a Spaceman" for the original soundtrack of that movie.

Clouser has also worked as a film and television composer, scoring the entire Saw series of films. He was the "top choice" for scoring the first film of the series, as director James Wan and writer Leigh Whannell are both Nine Inch Nails fans and they used remixes of the band's songs for the temp score. Clouser said, "They wanted progressive, underground music that was kind of underground, and they were looking to inject that flavor in the score." He has also scored films such as Deepwater (2005), Dead Silence (2007), Death Sentence (2007), and Resident Evil: Extinction (2007). On television, he was the composer for the TV series Las Vegas (NBC), for which he won a BMI TV Music Award, Fastlane (Fox), and Numbers (CBS). Additionally, he composed the theme song for those shows as well as American Horror Story (FX).

== Personal life ==
Clouser married his long-time girlfriend, photographer and model Zoe Wiseman, in the summer of 2007.

== Discography ==
With Nine Inch Nails

- The Downward Spiral (1994)
- Further Down the Spiral (1995)
- The Perfect Drug (1997)
- Closure (1997)
- The Day the World Went Away (1999)
- The Fragile (1999)
- Into the Void (1999)
- Starfuckers, Inc. (1999)
- Things Falling Apart (2000)
- And All That Could Have Been (2002)

Marilyn Manson

- Portrait of an American Family (1994)
- "Lunchbox" (1994)
- Smells Like Children (1995)
- "Sweet Dreams (Are Made of This)" (1995)
- Antichrist Superstar (1996)
- "Tourniquet Pt. 2" (1997)
- Lest We Forget: The Best Of (2004)

White Zombie

- Astro-Creep: 2000 (1995)
- More Human than Human (1995)
- Real Solution #9 (1995)
- Ratfinks, Suicide Tanks and Cannibal Girls (1996)
- Supersexy Swingin' Sounds (1996)
- Electric Head Pt. 2 (The Ecstasy) (1996)

Rob Zombie

- "The Great American Nightmare" with Howard Stern (1997)
- Hellbilly Deluxe (1998)
- Dragula (1998)
- Living Dead Girl (1999)
- American Made Music to Strip By (1999)
- Remix-a-Go-Go (1999)
- The Best of Rob Zombie (2006)

=== Other artists ===
Clouser has performed on releases with a variety of other artists and bands.

- 9 Ways to Sunday – 9 Ways to Sunday (1990)
- 12 Rounds – Pleasant Smell (1998)
- Alec Empire – Live at Fuji-Rock (2001)
- Apartment 26 – Music for the Massive (2004)
- Black Light Burns – Cruel Melody (2007)
- Burning Retna – Frozen Lies (2006)
- Collide
  - Vortex (2004)
  - Live at the El Rey (2005)
- David Bowie
  - I'm Afraid of Americans (1997)
  - Seven (2000)
  - Best of Bowie (2002)
- Deltron 3030 – Positive Contact (2001)
- Die Krupps
  - The Final Remixes (1994)
  - Rings of Steel (1995)
  - Fire (1997)
- Esthero
  - Breath from Another (1998)
  - Heaven Sent (1998)
- FAT – Down Time (1995)
- Foetus – Blow (2001)
- Fuel – Natural Selection (2003)
- Helmet – Size Matters (2004)
- John Frusciante – Shadows Collide with People (2004)
- Killing Joke – Democracy (1996)
- Meat Beat Manifesto – Asbestos Lead Asbestos (1996)
- A Perfect Circle – eMOTIVe (2004)
- Prong
  - Broken Peace (1994)
  - Rude Awakening (1996)
- Puscifer – Don't Shoot the Messenger EP (2007)
- Radiator – Black Shine (remix) (1998)
- Rammstein – Stripped (1998)
- Reach 454 – Reach 454 (2003)
- Real McCoy – Another Night (1994)
- Schwein – Son of Schweinstein (2001)
- Snake River Conspiracy
  - Sonic Jihad – "Oh Well" (2000)
- Splattercell – AH - ReMiKSiS (2000)
- Type O Negative
  - Cinnamon Girl (1997)
  - D-Side 1 (2000)
  - Least Worst Of (2000)

=== Soundtracks ===
==== Film ====
Year	Title	Director	Studio(s)
2004	Saw	James Wan	Lionsgate Films
2005	Deepwater	David S. Marfield	Halcyon Entertainment
2005	Saw II	Darren Lynn Bousman	Lionsgate Films
2006	Saw III	Darren Lynn Bousman	Lionsgate Films
2007	Dead Silence	James Wan	Universal Pictures
2007	Death Sentence	James Wan	20th Century Fox
2007	Resident Evil: Extinction	Russell Mulcahy	Screen Gems
2007	Saw IV	Darren Lynn Bousman	Lionsgate Films
2008	Saw V	David Hackl	Lionsgate Films
2009	The Stepfather	Nelson McCormick	Screen Gems
2009	Saw VI	Kevin Greutert	Lionsgate Films
2010	Saw 3D	Kevin Greutert	Lionsgate Films
2012	The Collection	Marcus Dunstan	LD Entertainment
2016	The Neighbor	Marcus Dunstan	Anchor Bay Films
2017	Jigsaw	The Spierig Brothers	Lionsgate Films
2021	Spiral	Darren Lynn Bousman	Lionsgate Films
2021	Eye Without A Face	Ramin Niami	Sideshow
2022	Unhuman	Marcus Dunstan	Blumhouse Productions
2023	Saw X	Kevin Greutert	Lionsgate Films

==== Television ====
Year	Title	Studio(s)	Notes
2002–2003	Fastlane	Warner Bros. Television; 20th Century Fox Television	—N/a
2003–2008	Las Vegas	DreamWorks Television	"A Little Less Conversation" by Elvis Presley was the theme during the series run in the United States while "Let It Ride" by Clouser was used as the theme in international and DVD versions of the series
2005–2010	Numbers	Scott Free Productions	—N/a
2008	Fear Itself	Lionsgate Television	—N/a
2011–present	American Horror Story	20th Television	Theme music
2015	Childhood's End	Universal Cable Productions	—N/a
2015–2016	Wayward Pines	20th Century Fox Television	—N/a

==== Video games ====
Year	Title	Developer	Publisher	Notes
1999	WCW Mayhem	Kodiak Interactive	Electronic Arts	song "Mayhem"
2009	Singularity	Raven Software	Activision	With Michael Wandmacher
2015	Evolve	Turtle Rock Studios	2K Games	With Jason Graves, Lustmord & Danny Cocke
