= Living Dead Girl (song) =

Single by Rob Zombie

from the album Hellbilly Deluxe
- Released: January 1999
- Recorded: 1998
- Studio: Chop Shop, Hollywood, California
- Genre: Industrial metal; Halloween; shock rock
- Length: 3:22
- Label: Geffen
- Songwriters: Rob Zombie, Scott Humphrey
- Producers: Rob Zombie, Scott Humphrey

Rob Zombie singles chronology
"Dragula" (1998)	"Living Dead Girl" (1999)	"Superbeast" (1999)

Music video
- "Living Dead Girl" on YouTube

Audio
- "Living Dead Girl (Subliminal Seduction Mix)" on YouTube

"Living Dead Girl" is a song by American rock musician Rob Zombie. It was released in January 1999 as the second single from his solo debut album, Hellbilly Deluxe (1998).

The song also appears on Rob Zombie's Past, Present & Future, the greatest hits album The Best of Rob Zombie, and remixes are contained on American Made Music to Strip By in 2001 and another one on Mondo Sex Head produced by Photek in 2012. The original mix was featured in both Bride of Chucky and Gus Van Sant's 1998 Psycho remake, appearing on the album of the latter. The "Naked Exorcism Remix" appeared on The Crow: Salvation Soundtrack in 2000. The song was covered by Sinus Giddy for The Electro-Industrial Tribute to Rob Zombie in 2002. Also a version of the song is played in a club in the TV show Angel, while the character Faith tears apart a dance club. The sleeve for the CD single features an image of Rob Zombie's wife, Sheri Moon. The song was featured in the trailer for the 2007 film Catacombs.

A trance remix of the song also featured on the English trailer for the film Day Watch in late 2007.

== Composition ==
The title of the song comes from the 1982 French horror film The Living Dead Girl (French: La morte vivante) directed by Jean Rollin. The line, "Who is this irresistible creature who has an insatiable love for the dead?" in the beginning of the song is from the trailer of the film Lady Frankenstein. The music in the beginning of the song is taken from the trailer of the Wes Craven film, The Last House on the Left. The spoken words "What are you thinking about?/The same thing you are" at the beginning of the verses are taken from the 1971 film Daughters of Darkness (a dialogue between the characters played by Delphine Seyrig and Andrea Rau). In this song, Zombie sings, "Goldfoot's machine creates another fiend so beautiful they make you kill". This relates to the villain played by Vincent Price in the 1965 film Dr. Goldfoot and the Bikini Machine and the 1966 film Dr. Goldfoot and the Girl Bombs. Also, he sings "Operation Filth they love to love the wealth of an SS whore making scary sounds." This is possibly a reference to the notorious 1974 film Ilsa: She-Wolf of the SS.

== Music video ==
The music video for "Living Dead Girl" derives its imagery from Robert Wiene's 1920 silent film, The Cabinet of Dr. Caligari, with Zombie in the role of The Doctor (played by Werner Krauss in the original film) and Sheri Moon in the place of The Living Dead Girl, whose appearance is inspired from the character White Zombie from White Zombie (in the original film a somnambulist named Cesare played by Conrad Veidt). The video imitates the appearance of aged, silent films, using intertitles and artificially grainy and herky-jerky images. Like Caligari, it also uses black and white film that has been tinted sepia, aqua and violet for Expressionistic effect. The video was directed by both Joseph Kahn and Rob Zombie.

== Personnel ==
=== Rob Zombie ===
- Rob Zombie - vocals
- Riggs - guitar
- Blasko - bass
- Tempesta - drums

=== Production ===
- Tom Baker - mastering
- Paul DeCarli - additional programming
- Frank Gyner - additional engineering
- Scott Humphrey - production, engineering, mixing, programming
- Chris Lord-Alge - additional mixing
- Rob Zombie - lyrics, artwork
- Sheri Moon Zombie - Living Dead Girl

== Charts ==
Chart performance for "Living Dead Girl"
Chart (1999)	Peak position
US Alternative Airplay (Billboard)	22
US Mainstream Rock (Billboard)	7

== Certifications ==
Certifications and sales for "Living Dead Girl"
Region	Certification	Certified units/sales
New Zealand (RMNZ)	Gold	15,000^{‡}
^{‡} Sales+streaming figures based on certification alone.
