= Black Rain (Ozzy Osbourne album) =

- Cover photography by Joseph Cultice

Studio album by Ozzy Osbourne
- Released: 22 May 2007
- Recorded: 2006
- Studios: The Music Machine, Beverly Hills, California
- Genre: Heavy metal
- Length: 46:28
- Label: Epic
- Producers: Ozzy Osbourne; Kevin Churko

Ozzy Osbourne chronology
Under Cover (2005)	Black Rain (2007)	Scream (2010)

Alternative cover
- Original cardboard slipcase released in the US

Singles from Black Rain
- 1. "I Don't Wanna Stop" Released: 17 April 2007; 2. "Not Going Away" Released: 11 July 2007; 3. "Black Rain" Released: 14 November 2007

Black Rain is the tenth studio album by the English heavy metal singer Ozzy Osbourne, released 22 May 2007 via Epic Records. It is Osbourne's last album to feature drummer Mike Bordin, and the first to feature bassist Rob Nicholson. It is also the first album since 2001's Down to Earth to feature guitarist Zakk Wylde and the last until 2022's Patient Number 9. Black Rain debuted at No. 3 on the US Billboard 200, selling about 152,000 copies in its first week; making it Osbourne's highest debut to date. The album has been certified Gold in US.

== Releases ==
The album was released in several different versions. The original US version was released in a thin, brown digipak with the crowned skull Ozzy Osbourne logo (pictured lower right), and for the rest of the world, it was released in a standard jewel case featuring cover art of Osbourne with "black rain" falling. This cover included a booklet complete with lyrics and album credits. The US version did not include a booklet, lyrics, or album credits. The Japanese release was the same as the other international releases, except it included two bonus tracks, "I Can't Save You", and "Nightmare". The iTunes release of the album included "Nightmare", plus an exclusive iTunes preorder bonus track, "Love to Hate". It also included a printable pdf file of the booklet, complete with lyrics and album credits. This same booklet was later made available as a free pdf download from Osbourne's website on 1 June. The song "I Don't Wanna Stop" was also featured as the theme song for WWE Judgment Day 2007.

In the US, limited edition copies of the album were sold with special codes enclosed, which could be used to redeem a pair of Ozzfest 2007 tickets. Ozzfest 2007 was nicknamed "Freefest" because all tickets were free.

The album was reissued in the US on 14 August in a new jewel case package containing the full booklet with lyrics and new colour cover art and photos, also containing CD extra bonus content featuring behind-the-scenes footage from the Black Rain photo shoot.

A "tour edition" version of the album was released on 20 November 2007. This release includes an extra CD with 3 live tracks and 3 studio tracks originally available on international releases or digital versions.

== Reception ==
Professional ratings
Review scores
Source	Rating
AllMusic	3.5/5 stars
Blabbermouth	7/10
Dotmusic	7/10
Entertainment Weekly	C+
Evening Standard	2/5 stars
IGN	7.9/10
MetalSucks	2.5/5 stars
PopMatters	7/10
Rolling Stone	2.5/5 stars
Sputnikmusic	1.5/5

Black Rain received mixed reviews. Rolling Stone referred to the album as "highly skippable" and Sputnikmusic called it "quite embarrassing". AllMusic was somewhat less harsh in its assessment, giving the album 3.5 out of 5 stars while noting that "Nothing on Black Rain could really qualify as an Osbourne classic."

== Usage in media ==
=== Television ===
- WWE used "I Don't Wanna Stop" at the official theme song to the 2007 PPV Judgment Day. Osbourne later performed the song live on the May 18, 2007 edition of WWE Friday Night SmackDown.
- Osbourne performed on Jimmy Kimmel Live! on 21 May and 22 May.
- Osbourne appeared on the second annual VH1 Rock Honors, and performed three songs, "Crazy Train", "Bark at the Moon" and "I Don't Wanna Stop". It was aired on 24 May 2007 on VH1 (TV airing cut the "Bark at the Moon" performance, but it airs as a music video on shows like Rock Fest and Metal Mania.)
- Osbourne appeared on BBC1's Friday Night with Jonathan Ross on 25 May 2007 and performed "I Don't Wanna Stop".
- Osbourne performed "Not Going Away" on Spike's Scream Award Ceremony.

=== Video games ===
- The song "I Don't Wanna Stop" is featured in the video games Guitar Hero: On Tour and Madden NFL 08. It was also released as downloadable content for the Rock Band video game series on June 15, 2010.

=== Radio ===
- "I Don't Wanna Stop" is used as the opening bumper music on the Boomer and Gio morning drive sports-talk program on WFAN. It was also used as a throwback track on The Heavy on 96 Rock.

== Track listing ==
Standard Edition
No.	Title	Writer(s)	Length
1.	"Not Going Away"	Ozzy Osbourne; Zakk Wylde; Kevin Churko	4:32
2.	"I Don't Wanna Stop"	Osbourne; Wylde; Churko	3:59
3.	"Black Rain"	Osbourne; Wylde; Churko	4:42
4.	"Lay Your World on Me"	Osbourne; Wylde; Churko	4:16
5.	"The Almighty Dollar"	Osbourne; Churko	6:57
6.	"11 Silver"	Osbourne; Wylde; Churko	3:42
7.	"Civilize the Universe"	Osbourne; Wylde; Churko	4:43
8.	"Here for You"	Osbourne; Wylde; Churko	4:37
9.	"Countdown's Begun"	Osbourne; Wylde; Churko	4:53
10.	"Trap Door"	Osbourne; Churko	4:03
Total length:			46:28

Japanese edition
No.	Title	Writer(s)	Length
11.	"I Can't Save You"	Osbourne; Wylde; Churko	3:32
12.	"Nightmare"	Osbourne; Wylde; Churko	4:40

iTunes pre-order bonus track
No.	Title	Writer(s)	Length
11.	"Love to Hate"	Osbourne; Wylde; Churko	3:57

Tour Edition - Disc 2
No.	Title	Writer(s)	Length
1.	"I Don't Wanna Stop" (live)	Osbourne; Wylde; Churko	3:44
2.	"Not Going Away" (live)	Osbourne; Wylde; Churko	4:36
3.	"Here for You" (live)	Osbourne; Wylde; Churko	4:50
4.	"Nightmare"	Osbourne; Wylde; Churko	4:40
5.	"I Can't Save You"	Osbourne; Wylde; Churko	3:32
6.	"Love to Hate"	Osbourne; Wylde; Churko	3:57

== Personnel ==
- Ozzy Osbourne – vocals, harmonica, producer
- Zakk Wylde – guitars, keyboards, backing vocals
- Rob "Blasko" Nicholson – bass
- Mike Bordin – drums

=== Production ===
- Kevin Churko – producer, engineer, mixing
- Zack Fagan – additional engineering
- Kane Churko – additional Pro Tools
- Vlado Meller – mastering
- Joshua Marc Levy – art direction and new logo design

== Charts ==
=== Weekly charts ===
Weekly chart performance for Black Rain
Chart (2007)	Peak position
Australian Albums (ARIA)	37
Austrian Albums (Ö3 Austria)	7
Belgian Albums (Ultratop Flanders)	78
Belgian Albums (Ultratop Wallonia)	69
Canadian Albums (Billboard)	5
Danish Albums (Hitlisten)	6
Dutch Albums (Album Top 100)	56
European Albums Chart	8
Finnish Albums (Suomen virallinen lista)	2
French Albums (SNEP)	91
German Albums (Offizielle Top 100)	9
Hungarian Albums (MAHASZ)	17
Irish Albums (IRMA)	53
Italian Albums (FIMI)	22
Japanese Albums (Oricon)	17
New Zealand Albums (RMNZ)	9
Norwegian Albums (VG-lista)	2
Polish Albums (ZPAV)	22
Scottish Albums (Official Charts)	9
Spanish Albums (Promusicae)	66
Swedish Albums (Sverigetopplistan)	2
Swiss Albums (Schweizer Hitparade)	23
UK Albums (Official Charts)	8
UK Rock & Metal Albums (Official Charts)	2
US Billboard 200	3
US Top Hard Rock Albums (Billboard)	8
US Top Rock Albums (Billboard)	2

=== Year-end charts ===
Year-end chart performance for Black Rain
Chart (2007)	Position
US Billboard 200	129

== Certifications ==
Certifications and sales for Black Rain
Region	Certification	Certified units/sales
Canada (Music Canada)	Platinum	100,000^{^}
Russia (NFPF)	Platinum	20,000^{*}
United States (RIAA)	Gold	500,000^{^}
^{*} Sales figures based on certification alone.^{^} Shipments figures based on certification alone.
