= Supersexy Swingin' Sounds =

Remix album by White Zombie
- Released: August 15, 1996
- Genre: Industrial metal; electro-industrial
- Length: 50:45
- Label: Geffen/MCA
- Producer: Terry Date

White Zombie chronology
| Astro-Creep: 2000 (1995) | Supersexy Swingin' Sounds (1996) | Let Sleeping Corpses Lie (2008) |

Alternative cover
- Cover of clean version

Audio
- "Album" playlist on YouTube

Professional ratings
Review scores
| Source | Rating |
|---|---|
| AllMusic | 3/5 stars |
| The Collector's Guide to Heavy Metal | 5/10 |
| The Encyclopedia of Popular Music | 3/5 stars |
| MusicHound Rock | 3/5 stars |
| NME | 3/10 |
| The Rolling Stone Album Guide | 2/5 stars |

Supersexy Swingin' Sounds is a remix album by American heavy metal band White Zombie. It was released through Geffen Records in 1996 and was the band's final release. The album consists of remixes of tracks from their previous release, Astro Creep 2000, except "I'm Your Boogie Man" by KC and the Sunshine Band. The Walmart and Kmart "clean version" of the album depict the cover model (Merci Montello) in a blue bikini rather than completely nude.

== Track listing ==
All lyrics are written by Rob Zombie; all music is composed by White Zombie, except "I'm Your Boogie Man" by KC and the Sunshine Band.

| No. | Title | Remixer | Length |
|---|---|---|---|
| 1. | "Electric Head Pt. 2 (The Ecstasy)" (Sexational After Dark mix) | Charlie Clouser | 5:00 |
| 2. | "More Human than Human" (Meet Bambi in the King's Harem mix) | Charlie Clouser | 4:20 |
| 3. | "I, Zombie" (Europe in the Raw mix) | John Fryer | 3:59 |
| 4. | "Grease Paint and Monkey Brains" (Sin Centers of Suburbia mix) | The Dust Brothers | 4:16 |
| 5. | "Blur the Technicolor" (Poker from Stud to Strip mix) | Mike "Hitman" Wilson | 5:16 |
| 6. | "Super-Charger Heaven" (Adults Only mix) | John Fryer | 5:19 |
| 7. | "El Phantasmo and the Chicken-Run Blast-O-Rama" (Wine, Women and Song mix) | Charlie Clouser | 4:00 |
| 8. | "Blood, Milk and Sky" (Miss September mix) | P.M. Dawn | 4:49 |
| 9. | "Real Solution #9" (Mambo Mania mix) | Charlie Clouser | 4:53 |
| 10. | "Electric Head Pt. 1 (The Agony)" (Satan in High Heels mix) | The Damage Twins | 4:04 |
| 11. | "I'm Your Boogie Man" (Sex on the Rocks mix) | The Dust Brothers | 4:49 |

== Personnel ==
Adapted from the Supersexy Swingin' Sounds liner notes.

White Zombie

- John Tempesta – drums
- Sean Yseult – bass guitar, art direction
- Jay Yuenger – electric guitar
- Rob Zombie – vocals, illustrations, art direction

Production and additional personnel

- Terry Date – production, engineering
- Michael Fossenkemper – engineering (8)
- Machine – programming (3, 6)
- Stephen Marcussen – mastering
- Brian Tucker – programming (5)
- Ulrich Wild – engineering
- Guitar/Bass Technician Michael Kaye

== Chart positions ==
| Chart (1996) | Peak position |
|---|---|
| Australian Albums (ARIA) | 49 |
| New Zealand Albums (RMNZ) | 29 |
| Swedish Albums (Sverigetopplistan) | 54 |
| US Billboard 200 | 17 |

== Release history ==
| Region | Date | Label | Format | Catalog |
|---|---|---|---|---|
| United States | 1996 | Geffen/MCA | CD, CS, LP | GEFD-24976 |
