= The Matrix: Original Motion Picture Score =

Soundtrack album by Don Davis
- Released: May 4, 1999
- Recorded: Newman Scoring Stage, 20th Century Fox, (Los Angeles, California)
- Genres: contemporary classical music, Film score
- Length: 29:53 (original edition); 78:08 (deluxe edition); 1:34:09 (the complete edition); 44:19 (25th anniversary expanded edition)
- Label: Varèse Sarabande
- Producer: Don Davis

Professional ratings
Review scores
Source	Rating
Allmusic	4/5 stars

The Matrix: Original Motion Picture Score is one of the two 1999 soundtrack albums from the film, The Matrix (the other being The Matrix: Music from the Motion Picture).

The Region 1 single disc DVD release (September 21, 1999) contained an isolated score track, including commentary by Davis.

== Track listing ==
1. Main Title / Trinity Infinity (3:54)
2. Unable to Speak (1:15)
3. The Power Plant (2:41)
4. Welcome to the Real World (2:28)
5. The Hotel Ambush (5:23)
6. Exit Mr. Hat (1:23)
7. A Virus (1:33)
8. Bullet-time (1:10)
9. Ontological Shock (3:32)
10. Anything Is Possible (6:48)

== The Deluxe Edition ==
In September 2008, Varèse Sarabande released an expanded to 78 minutes version of the score, that was limited to 3000 copies.

=== Track listing ===
1. Main Title / Trinity Infinity (3:49)
2. Neo On The Edge (3:23)
3. Unable To Speak (1:13)
4. Bait and Switch (3:15)
5. Switched for Life (3:35)
6. Switched At Birth (2:40)
7. Switch's Brew (2:26)
8. Cold Hearted Switch (1:38)
9. Nascent Nauseous Neo (2:05)
10. A Morpheus Moment (1:30)
11. Bow Whisk Orchestra (1:03)
12. Domo Showdown (1:14)
13. Switch Or Break Show (1:04)
14. Shake, Borrow, Switch (:33)
15. Freeze Face (1:48)
16. Switch Woks Her Boa (2:03)
17. Switch Out (2:56)
18. Boon Spoy (1:06)
19. Oracle Cookies (1:26)
20. Threat Mix (5:24)
21. Exit Mr. Hat (1:16)
22. On Your Knees, Switch (4:45)
23. Mix The Art (1:27)
24. Whoa, Switch Brokers (4:01)
25. No More Spoons (1:00)
26. Dodge This (1:06)
27. Ontological Shock (3:29)
28. That's Gotta Hurt (5:16)
29. Surprise! (4:04)
30. He's The One Alright (6:47)

Composed, orchestrated and conducted by Don Davis. Performed by The Hollywood Studio Symphony.

== The Complete Edition ==
In June 2021, Varèse Sarabande issued a further expanded version of the score on Digital, CD and SACD. It is named "The Complete Edition". This was also released on vinyl in July 2021:

1. A1 Logos / The Matrix Main Title 0:51
2. A2 Trinity Infinity 5:57
3. A3 Neo Con Brio 0:31
4. A4 Follow The White Rabbit 0:23
5. A5 Neo On The Edge 3:23
6. A6 Through The Surveillance Monitor 0:54
7. A7 Unable To Speak 1:08
8. A8 Bait And Switch 3:15
9. B1 Switched For Life 3:36
10. B2 Switched At Birth 2:41
11. B3 Switches Brew 2:26
12. B4 Cold Hearted Switch 1:38
13. B5 Nascent Nauseous Neo 3:59
14. B6 A Morpheus Moment 1:38
15. B7 Bow Whisk Orchestra 1:22
16. C1 Domo Showdown 1:14
17. C2 Switch Or Break Show 1:03
18. C3 Shake, Borrow, Switch 0:37
19. C4 Switch Works Her Boa 0:56
20. C5 Bring Me Dinner 0:37
21. C6 The System 0:36
22. C7 Freeze Face 1:51
23. C8 Switch Woks Her Boar 2:06
24. C9 Cypher Cybernetic 0:57
25. C10 Ignorance Is Bliss / Cyber Cyphernetic 1:48
26. C11 See Who? 0:19
27. C12 Switch Out 2:57
28. D1 Boon Spoy 1:07
29. D2 Oracle Cookies 1:29
30. D3 Threat Mix 6:03
31. D4 Exit Mr. Hat 2:55
32. D5 On Your Knees, Switch 4:43
33. E1 Mix The Art 2:09
34. E2 Whoa, Switch Broke 4:00
35. E3 The Cure 1:34
36. E4 It's The Smell 1:56
37. E5 The Lobby 0:27
38. E6 No More Spoons 1:01
39. E7 Dodge This 1:07
40. E8 Fast Learning 0:44
41. E9 Ontological Shock 4:16
42. F1 That's Gonna Hurt 5:16
43. F2 Surprise 4:04
44. F3 He's The One Alright 6:50

== 25th Anniversary Expanded Edition ==
In November 2024, Varèse Sarabande issued a 25th anniversary edition of the score on LP, CD and Digital. It contains a selection of tracks from the 1999, 2008 and 2021 albums.

1. Main Title (from The Matrix) / Trinity Infinity (3:51)
2. Unable To Speak (1:14)
3. Switched For Life (3:37)
4. Switched At Birth (2:42)
5. Switches Brew (2:28)
6. Nascent Nauseous Neo (4:00)
7. A Morpheus Movement (1:39)
8. Domo Showdown (1:14)
9. Bring Me Dinner (0:39)
10. The System (0:38)
11. The Hotel Ambush (5:23)
12. Ignorance Is Bliss / Cyber Cyphernetic (1:51)
13. Exit Mr. Hat (1:23)
14. The Cure (1:35)
15. The Lobby (0:27)
16. Dodge This (1:08)
17. Ontological Shock (3:32)
18. He’s The One Alright (6:51)
