= I Don't Wanna Stop =

Single by Ozzy Osbourne

from the album Black Rain
- Released: 17 April 2007
- Recorded: 2006
- Genre: Heavy metal
- Length: 3:59
- Label: Epic Records
- Songwriters: Ozzy Osbourne; Zakk Wylde; Kevin Churko
- Producer: Kevin Churko

Ozzy Osbourne singles chronology
"In My Life" (2006)	"I Don't Wanna Stop" (2007)	"Not Going Away" (2007)

"I Don't Wanna Stop" is the first single from English heavy metal singer Ozzy Osbourne's 10th studio album, Black Rain. The song was first announced and released through Osbourne's website.

== Background ==
"I Don't Wanna Stop" was named the official theme song to the WWE PPV Judgment Day. A week prior to the event, Osbourne performed the song on the May 18, 2007 edition of WWE Friday Night SmackDown that was taped at the 1st Mariner Arena in Baltimore, Maryland on 15 May. The episode aired outside the US on Sky Sports in the UK, FOX8 in Australia, and The Score in Canada also on 18 May.

The song is also the theme song of professional wrestler Brent Albright. The song was also played on BBC 1 on 25 May on Friday Night with Jonathan Ross. It was also performed at the 2nd annual VH1 Rock Honors award show, followed by "Crazy Train" and "Bark at the Moon".

The song was included in the in-game soundtrack to Madden NFL 08, which was released in August 2007. The song is also featured in the 5th and final tier of Guitar Hero: On Tour, notable for its unusually difficult solo section, and was released as downloadable content for the Rock Band video game series on 15 June 2010.

Osbourne performed this song, along with "Crazy Train" and "Not Going Away", on Jimmy Kimmel Live!.

The song was nominated for Best Hard Rock Performance at the 50th Annual Grammy Awards, but lost to Foo Fighters' "The Pretender".

== Charts ==
=== Weekly charts ===
Weekly chart performance for "I Don't Wanna Stop"
Chart (2007)	Peak position
Canada Hot 100 (Billboard)	21
US Billboard Hot 100	61
US Mainstream Rock (Billboard)	1
US Pop 100 (Billboard)	54

=== Year-end charts ===
Year-end chart performance for "I Don't Wanna Stop"
Chart (2007)	Position
US Mainstream Rock Songs (Billboard)	6

== Personnel ==
- Ozzy Osbourne - vocals
- Zakk Wylde - electric guitar, Keyboards
- Rob "Blasko" Nicholson - bass
- Mike Bordin - drums
