= Zoe Wiseman =

American model and photographer (born 1970)

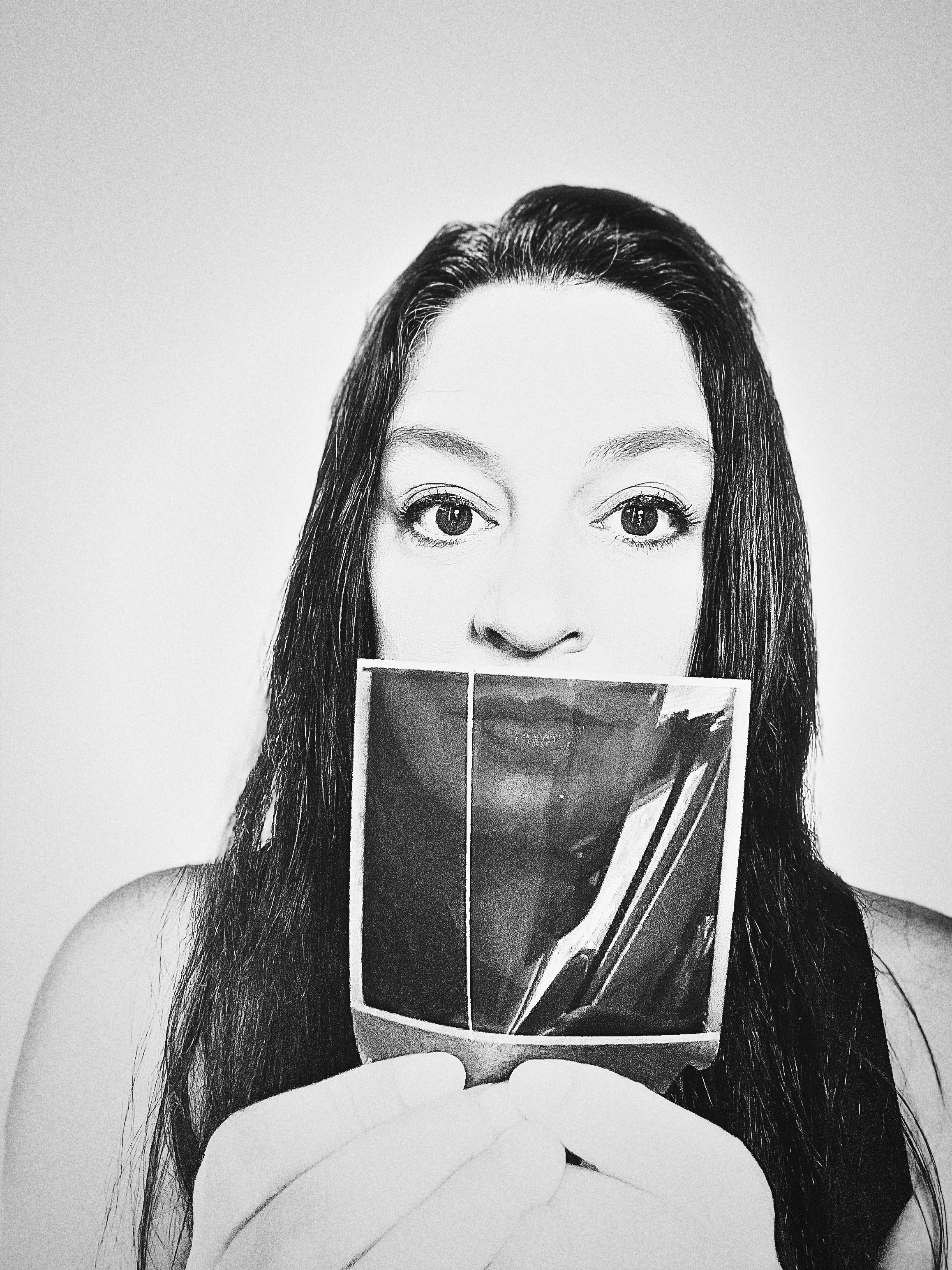
Zoe Wiseman with a Polaroid Type 85 Negative

Zoe Wiseman (born 1970 in Marion, Indiana) is a former American model and is now a photographer known for her fine art nude photography, and is the web owner of Community Zoe which promotes specifically fine art nude photography. Several photo books, soundtracks and magazines have showcased her photography. She was awarded Gold at the Prix de la Photographie, Paris (PX3) in 2022.

== Photo books and magazines ==
- SUNKISSED 85 (sunkissed85.com)
- Passion and Desire (Edition Skylight 2005)
- Fine Art Photo Magazine (Hillebrand 2004 & 2007)
- Photo Art Magazine (2007)
- DISCONTINUde (Blurb 2008)
- "210 Photographers" (1X Publishing, Sweden)
- Nudes Index II (Feierabend 2009)
- "i spy with my plastic eye" (A&I December 2009)
- "Fiat Lux" - Fine Art Nudes by Zoe Wiseman - (A&I February 2010)
- "Le Nu" - Fine Art Nude Photography book (A&I May 2010)
- "Silvergrain Classics - analog photography magazine (December 2021)

== Soundtracks ==
- Moog
- Saw II, Original Score by Charlie Clouser

== Personal life ==
In the summer of 2007, Wiseman married longtime boyfriend Charlie Clouser.
