= Electric Head, Pt. 2 (The Ecstasy) =

"Electric Head Pt. 2 (The Ecstasy)"

Single by White Zombie

from the album Astro-Creep: 2000
- B-side: "El Phantasmo and the Chicken-Run Blast-O-Rama", "Super-Charger Heaven", "More Human than Human (The Warlord Of Mars Mega Mix)"
- Released: October 1995
- Recorded: 1995
- Studio: NRG Studios, Los Angeles
- Genre: Industrial metal * Groove metal
- Length: 3:53
- Label: Geffen
- Songwriters: Rob Zombie, White Zombie
- Producer: Terry Date

White Zombie singles chronology
"More Human than Human" (1995)	"Electric Head Pt. 2 (The Ecstasy)" (1995)	"Super-Charger Heaven" (1996)

Music video
- "Electric Head, Pt. 2" on YouTube

Audio
- "Electric Head, Pt. 2 (Sexational After Dark mix)" on YouTube

"Electric Head Pt. 2 (The Ecstasy)" is the second official single from the Astro-Creep: 2000 album by the heavy metal band White Zombie. A remix version of this song was the first track on the 1996 album Supersexy Swingin' Sounds.

== Origins ==
The song contains audio samples taken from the 1971 movie Shaft. In the song, the lyrics "A fistful of hair and a splinter in the mind" could possibly refer to Lucio Fulci's 1979 film Zombie in which a zombie grabs a woman by the hair and pulls her through a closet, causing a shard of wood to pierce her eye.

== Music video ==
The music video, the second music video made for a song from the Astro Creep album, shows the band playing in a circus of freaks, clowns and monsters while riding on a truck.

== Track listings ==
=== First single (1995) ===
1. "Electric Head Pt. 2 (the Ecstasy)" (LP version) – 3:53
2. "Blood, Milk and Sky" (Im-Ho-Tep 3,700 Year Old Boogie Mix) – 5:03

=== Second single (1995) ===
1. "Electric Head Pt. 2 (the Ecstasy)" (The Creature Feature 56 Mix) – 4:55
2. "Electric Head Pt. 2 (the Ecstasy)" (LP version) – 3:53
3. "Electric Head Pt. 2 (the Ecstasy)" (Shut Up and Kill Mix) – 4:55
4. "Electric Head Pt. 1 (the Agony)" (LP version) – 4:54

=== Third single (1995) ===
1. "Electric Head Pt. 2 (the Ecstasy)" (LP version) – 3:53
2. "More Human than Human" (The Warlord of Mars Mega Mix) – 4:57
3. "Blood, Milk and Sky" (Im-Ho-Tep 3,700 Year Old Boogie Mix) – 5:03
4. "Thunder Kiss '65" (Swinging Lovers Mix) – 4:44

=== Fourth single (1995) ===
1. "Electric Head Pt. 2 (the Ecstasy)" (LP version) – 3:53
2. "More Human than Human" (Warlord of Mars Mega Mix) – 5:00
3. "Black Sunshine" (Indestructible "Sock It to Me" Psycho-Head Mix) – 5:01
4. "Thunder Kiss '65" (Swinging Lovers Mix) – 6:14
5. "Creature of the Wheel" (LP version) – 3:25 {incorrectly listed as "Electric Head Pt.2" (the Ecstasy (clean edit) on disc}

=== Fifth single (1995) ===
1. "Electric Head Pt. 2 (The Ecstasy)" (LP version) – 3:53
2. "El Phantasmo and the Chicken-Run Blast-O-Rama" (LP version) – 4:13
3. "More Human than Human" (LP version) – 4:28
4. "Super-Charger Heaven" (LP version) – 3:37

=== Sixth single (1996) ===
1. "Electric Head Pt. 2 (The Ecstasy)" (LP version) – 3:53
2. "El Phantasmo and the Chicken-Run Blast-O-Rama" (LP version) – 4:13
3. "More Human than Human" (Princess of Helium Ultra Mix) – 4:17
4. "Blood, Milk & Sky" (Im-Ho-Tep 3,7000 Year Old Boogie Mix) – 5:03

=== Seventh single (1996) ===
1. "Electric Head Part 2 (The Ecstasy)" (LP version) – 3:35
2. "El Phantasmo and the Chicken-Run Blast-O-Ram" (LP version) – 4:12
3. "Super-Charger Heaven" (LP version) – 3:37
4. "More Human than Human" (The Warlord of Mars Mega Mix) – 5:00

=== Eighth single (1996) ===
1. "Electric Head Part 2 (The Ecstasy)" (LP version) – 3:35
2. "Super-Charger Heaven" (LP version) – 3:37
3. "More Human than Human" (LP version) – 4:28
4. "Thunder Kiss '65" (LP version) – 3:54

== Charts ==
Chart performance for "Electric Head, Pt. 2 (The Ecstasy)"
Chart (1995)	Peak position
Australia (ARIA)	95
UK (Official Charts Company)	31
US (Mainstream Rock Tracks)	27
