= The Matrix: Music from the Motion Picture =

Soundtrack album by various artists
- Released: March 30, 1999
- Recorded: 1992–1999
- Genres: Big beat, trip hop, industrial metal, nu metal, rap metal, stoner rock, hard rock
- Length: 62:36
- Label: Warner Bros. / Maverick / Real Gone
- Producers: Marilyn Manson, Michael Beinhorn, Sean Beavan, Rob Dougan, Meat Beat Manifesto, Lunatic Calm, Liam Howlett, Charlie Clouser, Al Jourgensen, Paul Barker, Terry Date, Dave Wyndorf, Jacob Hellner, Rammstein, Garth Richardson, Rage Against the Machine

Singles from The Matrix: Music from the Motion Picture
- 1. "Rock Is Dead" Released: June 14, 1999; 2. "Bad Blood" Released: September 14, 1999

Professional ratings
Review scores
Source	Rating
AllMusic	3/5 stars

The Matrix: Music from the Motion Picture is one of the two 1999 soundtrack albums from the blockbuster film, The Matrix (the other being The Matrix: Original Motion Picture Score).

The soundtrack included most of the tracks the film popularized such as Rob D's "Clubbed to Death", Rob Zombie's "Dragula (Hot Rod Herman Remix)" and "Spybreak!", played by the British big beat duo Propellerheads. It also included a number of songs that were not present in the film.

== Track listing ==
1. "Rock Is Dead" by Marilyn Manson – 3:11
2. "Spybreak! (Short One)" by Propellerheads – 4:00
3. "Bad Blood" by Ministry – 5:00
4. "Clubbed to Death (Kurayamino Mix)" by Rob D – 7:26
5. "Prime Audio Soup" by Meat Beat Manifesto – 6:17
6. "Leave You Far Behind" by Lunatic Calm – 3:13
7. "Mindfields" by The Prodigy – 5:40
8. "Dragula (Hot Rod Herman Remix)" by Rob Zombie – 4:37
9. "My Own Summer (Shove It)" by Deftones – 3:34
10. "Ultrasonic Sound" by Hive – 4:54
11. "Look to Your Orb for the Warning (Radio Edit)" by Monster Magnet – 4:42
12. "Du hast" by Rammstein – 3:54
13. "Wake Up" by Rage Against the Machine – 6:08

=== Track order by movie appearance ===
- "Dragula", when Neo meets Trinity at the night club - in background as Trinity says "Hello Neo..." [00:09:42].
- "Mindfields", in the same scene - in background, faded into from "Dragula" just as Trinity says "My name is Trinity." [00:10:19].
- "Leave You Far Behind (Lunatics Roller Coaster Mix)", during the fight training scene between Neo and Morpheus [00:50:22].
- "Clubbed to Death", when Neo and Morpheus are in the "Woman in the red dress" program [00:56:35].
- "Prime Audio Soup", when the crew of Nebuchadnezzar are seen plugging into the Matrix for the first time with Neo in preparation for their visit with The Oracle [01:07:07].
- "Spybreak!", during the lobby shootout scene [01:42:13].
- "Wake Up", when Neo hangs up the phone at the end of the movie and flies away, continues into credits [02:08:45].
- "Rock Is Dead", credits [02:11:24].

=== Music from the film that does not appear on the soundtrack ===
- The music playing on Neo's headphones ("Dissolved Girl" by Massive Attack) when he is contacted by Trinity. [00:06:42]
- The background music when Neo fights Morpheus in the sparring program (Don Davis' "Bow Whisk Orchestra" [an anagram of "Wachowski Brothers"], combining semi-improvisational drumming, Lunatic Calm's mix of "Leave You Far Behind", and Davis' "Switch or Break Show" [also an anagram of "Wachowski Brothers"]. The version of "Leave You Far Behind" found in the soundtrack is the original album one, not the movie mix.).
- The music from Night of the Lepus that can be heard from the television set in the Oracle's living room is "Begin the Run" written by Jimmie Haskell.
- The faint music that can be heard when Neo meets the Oracle is of 1930s jazz origin - "Minor Swing" by guitarist Django Reinhardt is followed by composer Duke Ellington's "I'm Beginning to See the Light".
- A track from "The Eyes of Truth", by the musical project Enigma, was used for the movie's worldwide trailer.
- A track similar to "The Eyes of Truth" titled "The Conquest of Truth" composed and recorded by Paul Hanson for Music Junkies was used for the DVD main menu.
- A track titled "(Can't You) Trip Like I Do", a collaboration between the groups Filter and The Crystal Method, was used for the theatrical trailer of the movie. This track can be found on the Spawn soundtrack album.
- None of the orchestral score in the movie was used in the original soundtrack (OST); parts of it received a separate release as The Matrix: Original Motion Picture Score.

== Charts ==
=== Weekly charts ===
Chart (1999)	Peak position
Australian Albums (ARIA)	5
Austrian Albums (Ö3 Austria)	2
Belgian Albums (Ultratop Flanders)	19
Belgian Albums (Ultratop Wallonia)	16
Canadian Albums (Billboard)	7
Dutch Albums (Album Top 100)	27
Finnish Albums (Suomen virallinen lista)	6
French Albums (SNEP)	12
German Albums (Offizielle Top 100)	4
Hungarian Albums (MAHASZ)	3
New Zealand Albums (RMNZ)	5
Norwegian Albums (VG-lista)	2
Scottish Albums (Official Charts)	38
Spanish Albums (AFYVE)	13
Swiss Albums (Schweizer Hitparade)	11
UK Compilation Albums (OCC)	16
UK Soundtrack Albums (Official Charts)	6
US Billboard 200	7

=== Year-end charts ===
Chart (1999)	Position
Australian Albums (ARIA)	66
Austrian Albums (Ö3 Austria)	23
German Albums (Offizielle Top 100)	43
New Zealand Albums (RMNZ)	43
US Billboard 200	91

== Certifications ==
Region	Certification	Certified units/sales
Australia (ARIA)	Platinum	70,000^{^}
Austria (IFPI Austria)	Gold	25,000^{*}
France (SNEP)	Gold	100,000^{*}
Japan (RIAJ)	Gold	100,000^{^}
New Zealand (RMNZ)	Gold	7,500^{^}
Poland (ZPAV)	Gold	50,000^{*}
Spain (Promusicae)	Gold	50,000^{^}
Switzerland (IFPI Switzerland)	Gold	25,000^{^}
United Kingdom (BPI)	Gold	100,000^{^}
United States (RIAA)	Platinum	1,460,000
Summaries
Europe (IFPI)	Platinum	1,000,000^{*}
^{*} Sales figures based on certification alone.^{^} Shipments figures based on certification alone.
