= Astro-Creep: 2000 =

Studio album by White Zombie
- Released: April 11, 1995
- Recorded: September–December 1994
- Studio: NRG (Los Angeles)
- Genres: Groove metal; industrial metal; alternative metal
- Length: 52:01
- Label: Geffen
- Producer: Terry Date

White Zombie chronology
La Sexorcisto: Devil Music Volume One (1992)	Astro-Creep: 2000 (1995)	Supersexy Swingin' Sounds (1996)

Singles from Astro-Creep: 2000
- 1. "More Human than Human" Released: May 7, 1995; 2. "Electric Head, Pt. 2 (The Ecstasy)" Released: October 1995; 3. "Super-Charger Heaven" Released: 1996

Audio
- "Album" playlist on YouTube

Astro-Creep: 2000 – Songs of Love, Destruction and Other Synthetic Delusions of the Electric Head (often shortened to Astro-Creep 2000) is the fourth and final studio album by American heavy metal band White Zombie, released on April 11, 1995, by Geffen Records. Adding more industrial textures and disturbing subject matters to the groove metal and alternative metal foundation of the band's previous album, La Sexorcisto: Devil Music Volume One (1992), it is their only record with John Tempesta on drums.

White Zombie's most commercially successful album, Astro-Creep 2000 peaked at No. 6 on the Billboard 200 with the aid of hit singles "More Human than Human" and "Super-Charger Heaven". With over 2.6 million copies sold in the US, it was certified double-platinum and nominated for a Grammy Award for Best Engineered Album, but lost to Tom Petty's Wildflowers (1994).

== Production ==
The album was highly anticipated due to the surprise success of the band's previous release La Sexorcisto: Devil Music Volume One. Ivan DePrume, the band's long-time drummer, had left the band to start Burningsound studios during their touring sessions for that album. The band later recruited former Exodus and Testament drummer John Tempesta for the recording of this album. The album had help from significant industrial musicians, such as the keyboard work from Charlie Clouser, who had worked with artists like Nine Inch Nails, Rammstein, Marilyn Manson, Killing Joke, and more. They had also hired Terry Date (Deftones, Pantera, Soundgarden) to produce Astro-Creep: 2000 for them. According to J., the album comprises seventy-two track recordings, forty-eight of which are analog and twenty-four being digital recordings. For the album, the band had a much bigger recording budget and more freedom in time.

The entire album took three months to write and another three to record. Writing for the album began in June 1994, shortly after White Zombie finished touring Japan. Recording was scheduled to commence in September 1994, and the album was finished by Christmas 1994.

== Music and lyrics ==
The album is much heavier than La Sexorcisto and has been called "white-trash-on-acid metal" by Stephen Thomas Erlewine of AllMusic. The band also down-tuned the guitars and bass to give it the darker sound that the songs required, going from standard E tuning to dropped C# (3 semitones below E standard).

Much of the lyrics are also darker and more disturbing than on the previous album, and are arranged more like twisted poetry than La Sexorcisto's pseudo-rap scores, dealing with murder, the undead, blasphemy, and satanic elements.

As with the previous two albums, many of the songs feature snippets of dialogue from horror and cult films including The Omega Man, Shaft, The Haunting, The Curse of Frankenstein and To the Devil a Daughter. The titular refrain of "More Human Than Human" is taken from the 1982 film Blade Runner.

Rob has said he favors this album to the previous one, stating, "I was never that happy with it [La Sexorcisto]. In some respects, it was probably the best thing we could do at the time under the circumstances; and that this record was exactly what we wanted it to sound like."

== Reception ==
Professional ratings
Review scores
Source	Rating
AllMusic	4/5 stars
Chicago Tribune	3/4 stars
Collector's Guide to Heavy Metal	8/10
The Encyclopedia of Popular Music	4/5 stars
Entertainment Weekly	B+
Kerrang!	(1995) (2011)
Los Angeles Times	3.5/4 stars
The Philadelphia Inquirer	3.5/4 stars
Q	3/5 stars
The Rolling Stone Album Guide	3/5 stars

Astro-Creep: 2000 received generally positive reviews from critics, it is White Zombie's best-selling album, being certified double Platinum by the RIAA and selling over 2,600,000 copies in America since its release. There was also a limited 50,000 pressings of this album on see-through blue vinyl. The album has been certified by CAN platinum. The album was nominated for a Grammy Award for Best Engineered Album and the band's biggest hit, "More Human than Human", nominated for a Grammy Award for Best Metal Performance in 1996.

To promote the album, music videos for "More Human than Human", "Electric Head Pt. 2 (The Ecstasy)", and a live video for "Super-Charger Heaven" were released. In 1995, "More Human than Human" won the MTV Video Music Award for Best Rock Video.

There were also plans to start filming a video for "Blood, Milk and Sky" after Christmas as well as eventually filming a video for every song on the album. However, these plans were scrapped when the band dissolved.

=== Accolades ===
Publication	Country	Accolade	Year	Rank
Kerrang!	United Kingdom	"Albums of the Year"	1995	2
Rocksound	France	"Albums of the Year"	1995	20
OOR	Netherlands	"Albums of the Year"	1995	23
RAW	United Kingdom	"90 essential albums for the 90s"	1995	*
Kerrang!	United Kingdom	"100 Albums You Must Hear Before You Die"	1998	20
Pause & Play	United States	"The 90s Top 100 Essential Albums"	1999	11
Visions	Germany	"The Most Important Albums of the 90s"	2005	91
Classic Rock & Metal Hammer	United Kingdom	"The 200 Greatest Albums of the 90s"	2006	*

== Track listing ==
All lyrics are written by Rob Zombie; all music is composed by Sean Yseult, Jay Yuenger, and John Tempesta, except where noted.

No.	Title	Music	Length
1.	"Electric Head Pt. 1 (The Agony)"		4:54
2.	"Super-Charger Heaven"		3:37
3.	"Real Solution #9"		4:44
4.	"Creature of the Wheel"	Yseult; Yuenger	3:25
5.	"Electric Head Pt. 2 (The Ecstasy)"		3:53
6.	"Grease Paint and Monkey Brains"		3:49
7.	"I, Zombie"		3:31
8.	"More Human than Human"	Yseult; Yuenger	4:28
9.	"El Phantasmo and the Chicken-Run Blast-O-Rama"		4:13
10.	"Blur the Technicolor"	Yseult; Yuenger	4:09
11.	"Blood, Milk and Sky^{[I]}"		11:21
Total length:			52:01

I "Blood, Milk and Sky" contains the hidden track "Where the Sidewalk Ends, the Bug Parade Begins" at 8:45, after 3 minutes of silence. On the digital version, however, the hidden track is its own 2:33 track.

== Personnel ==
Adapted from the Astro-Creep: 2000 – Songs of Love, Destruction and Other Synthetic Delusions of the Electric Head liner notes.

White Zombie

- Rob Zombie – vocals
- Jay Yuenger – guitars
- Sean Yseult – bass
- John Tempesta – drums

Additional musicians

- Charlie Clouser – keyboards, programming

Production and additional personnel

- Terry Date – production, recording, mixing
- Lamont Hyde – mixing assistant
- Ted Jensen – mastering
- Wade Norton – recording assistant
- Ulrich Wild – recording
- Sean Yseult – art direction
- Rob Zombie – illustrations, art direction

== Chart positions ==
Album

Chart (1995)	Peak position
Australian Albums (ARIA)	16
Austrian Albums (Ö3 Austria)	26
Belgian Albums (Ultratop Flanders)	46
French Albums (SNEP)	60
German Albums (Offizielle Top 100)	57
New Zealand Albums (RMNZ)	16
Swedish Albums (Sverigetopplistan)	30
Swiss Albums (Schweizer Hitparade)	40
UK Albums (OCC)	25
UK Rock & Metal Albums (Official Charts)	1
US Billboard 200	6

Singles

Year	Title	Peak chart positions			
Year	Title	US Main	US Mod	AUS	UK
1995	"Electric Head Pt. 2 (The Ecstasy)"	27	—	95	31
1995	"More Human Than Human"	10	7	37	51
1996	"Super-Charger Heaven"	39	—	—	—
"—" denotes singles that were released but did not chart.

== Certifications ==
Region	Certification	Certified units/sales
Canada (Music Canada)	Platinum	100,000^{^}
United Kingdom (BPI)	Gold	100,000^{^}
United States (RIAA)	2× Platinum	2,500,000
^{^} Shipments figures based on certification alone.

== Release history ==
Region	Date	Label	Format	Catalog
United States	1995	Geffen	CD, CS, LP	GEF 24806
Europe	2012	Music on Vinyl	LP	MOVLP547
