= Dragula (song) =

1998 single by Rob Zombie

Single by Rob Zombie

from the album Hellbilly Deluxe
- B-side: "Super Monster Sex Action", "Halloween (She Get So Mean)"
- Released: August 24, 1998
- Recorded: 1998
- Studio: Chop Shop, Hollywood, California
- Genre: Industrial metal; nu metal
- Length: 3:42
- Label: Geffen
- Songwriters: Rob Zombie; Scott Humphrey
- Producers: Rob Zombie; Scott Humphrey

Rob Zombie singles chronology
"Dragula" (1998)	"Living Dead Girl" (1999)

Music video
- "Dragula" on YouTube

Audio
- "Dragula (Si Non Oscillas, Noli Tintinnare Mix)" on YouTube

"Dragula" is a debut solo single co-written and recorded by American rock musician Rob Zombie. It was released in August 1998 as the lead single from his solo debut Hellbilly Deluxe. Since its release, it has become Zombie's most recognizable song as a solo artist. It is also his best-selling song, and had sold over 717,000 copies in the U.S. by 2010. The song is based on the drag racer "DRAG-U-LA" from the sitcom The Munsters.

The audio clip "superstition, fear and jealousy" heard at the beginning of the song is a sample of dialogue from the 1960 horror film The City of the Dead (also known as Horror Hotel), and is spoken by Christopher Lee.

The song also appears on Rob Zombie's Past, Present & Future and the greatest hits album The Best of Rob Zombie. The original single included a big beat remix of the song by Charlie Clouser, entitled the "Hot Rod Herman" remix (in reference to the Munsters episode), which is contained on American Made Music to Strip By (under the name Si Non Oscillas, Noli Tintinnare Mix). Additionally, it appeared on the soundtracks for video games, films and TV shows.

== Background and writing ==
Zombie told Billboard magazine that the title came from the name of Grandpa Munster's eponymous dragster DRAG-U-LA on The Munsters. He goes on to say that it "was a classic show with great comic characters. Strangely enough, 'Dragula' was one of the last songs finished for the record. It fell together really fast and worked, but it could just as easily not [have] been on the record."

== Music video ==
The music video shows Rob Zombie driving the Munster Koach (not the actual Dragula racing car) with various shots of the band members in Southern California locations such as the Pasadena Arroyo Seco Parkway with shots of the 3rd Street tunnel and Lower Grand Boulevard in Los Angeles and different scenes from classic horror films, e.g. Dr. Jekyll and Mr. Hyde (1920) at the beginning of the video and the killer robot from chapter film series The Phantom Creeps (1939) along with home video footage of mid-20th-century families being entertained by a clown with clips of nuclear testing mushroom clouds sardonically overlapping of when the clown and a girl are laughing, with the multi-color backdrops referencing Willy Wonka & the Chocolate Factory (1971), also with early-20th-century footage of children being entertained and shocked. It achieved heavy rotation on MTV following the huge success of the album. The video also appears in the 1999 film Idle Hands.

== Releases ==
UK CD Maxi Single
No.	Title	Length
1.	"Dragula"	3:42
2.	"Dragula" (Hot Rod Herman Remix)	4:36
3.	"Dragula" (Enhanced Music Video)	3:42
Total length:		12:00

UK 7" Picture Disc 1
No.	Title	Length
1.	"Dragula"	3:42
2.	"Halloween (She Get So Mean)"	2:50
Total length:		6:32

UK 7" Picture Disc 2
No.	Title	Length
1.	"Dragula"	3:42
2.	"Dragula" (Hot Rod Herman Remix)	4:36
Total length:		8:18

US Promotional 7"
No.	Title	Length
1.	"Dragula"	3:42
2.	"Super Monster Sex Action"	3:00
Total length:		6:42

US CD Maxi Single
No.	Title	Length
1.	"Dragula"	3:42
2.	"Dragula" (Hot Rod Herman Remix)	4:36
3.	"What Lurks On Channel X?"	2:29
Total length:		10:47

== Personnel ==
- Rob Zombie – vocals
- Riggs – guitars
- Blasko – bass
- Tempesta – drums

=== Additional personnel ===
- Rob Zombie – lyrics, artwork, music
- Tom Baker – mastering
- Paul DeCarli – additional programming
- Frank Gryner – additional engineering
- Scott Humphrey – production, engineering, mixing, programming
- Chris Lord-Alge – additional mixing

== Charts ==
Chart performance for "Dragula"
Chart (1998)	Peak position
Canada Rock/Alternative (RPM)	1
Scottish Singles Sales (Official Charts)	50
UK Singles (Official Charts)	44
US Bubbling Under Hot 100 (Billboard)	16
US Mainstream Rock (Billboard)	6
US Alternative Airplay (Billboard)	27

== Certifications ==
Certifications and sales for "Dragula"
Region	Certification	Certified units/sales
New Zealand (RMNZ)	2× Platinum	60,000^{‡}
United Kingdom (BPI)	Gold	400,000^{‡}
^{‡} Sales+streaming figures based on certification alone.

== In popular culture ==
The Hot Rod Herman remix version of the song is featured in the soundtrack of the 1999 Warner Bros. film The Matrix. The song was also featured in several video games including Sled Storm, Twisted Metal 4, Gran Turismo 2, and Jet Set Radio. In addition, the original version was featured in the 2012 Twisted Metal reboot and in Fortnite Festival games and in the Peacock TV Series Twisted Metal season 2.

== See also ==
- Trollhättan school stabbing, a 2015 mass stabbing in Trollhattan, Sweden, whose perpetrator played "Dragula" on his phone during the attack
