= More Human than Human =

Single by White Zombie

from the album Astro-Creep: 2000
- B-side: "More Human than Human (The Jeddak of the Tharks Super Mix)"; "Blood, Milk and Sky"
- Released: May 7, 1995
- Recorded: 1994
- Studio: NRG, Los Angeles
- Genre: Industrial metal; alternative metal
- Length: 4:28
- Label: Geffen
- Songwriter(s): Sean Yseult; Jay Yuenger; Rob Zombie
- Producer(s): Terry Date

White Zombie singles chronology
"Black Sunshine" (1993)	"More Human than Human" (1995)	"Electric Head Pt. 2 (The Ecstasy)" (1995)

Music video
- "More Human than Human (radio edit)" on YouTube

Audio
- "More Human than Human" on YouTube

"More Human than Human" is a song by the American heavy metal band White Zombie from their album Astro-Creep: 2000 (1995). It was released as the first official single from the album and is also included on Rob Zombie's Past, Present & Future, the greatest hits album The Best of Rob Zombie, and a remix is included on Supersexy Swingin' Sounds and Revolutions.

== Music and lyrics ==
The title and lyrics reference the novel Do Androids Dream of Electric Sheep? by Philip K. Dick, adapted in film as Blade Runner. The title was the slogan of the Tyrell Corporation, manufacturers of the very humaniform biological androids, or "replicants" that are the focal point of the story. "I want more life, fucker" (quoted in the lyrics) is one of the last things his creator hears when the replicant designed to be the perfect – and disposable – soldier (Rutger Hauer) finds him and is denied a reprieve from the programmed four-year life span.

The song features a repeated slide guitar figure, a technique typically associated with blues music.

The moaning in the intro to the song was sampled from a post-apocalyptic porn movie called Café Flesh directed by Stephen Sayadian.

== Reception ==
"More Human than Human" quickly became the band's highest-charting and most recognizable single in the entirety of their career. The song earned them their second Grammy nomination for Best Metal Performance in 1995. The song was named the 68th best hard rock song of all time by VH1.

The song was listed on PopMatters's "The 10 Best Alternative Metal Singles of the 1990s" list.

"More Human than Human" was ranked at number 43 on Spin's "The 95 Best Alternative Rock Songs of 1995" list.

== Music video ==
The music video of "More Human than Human," the first video made for Astro-Creep: 2000, features White Zombie playing the track in a room and short clips of old home video footage of Rob, his brother, Michael Cummings (better known as Spider One of the band Powerman 5000), and a cousin at a young age. Part of the video was also shot in the halls of Framingham High School, Framingham, Massachusetts, as well as on the streets of Hollywood Boulevard. It was the first video that had been completely directed by Rob alone. In 1995, he won the MTV Video Music Award for Hard Rock Video for this music video. At the time, it was Rob's favorite White Zombie music video.

== Charts ==
Chart performance for "More Human than Human"
Chart (1995)	Peak position
Australia (ARIA)	37
Canadian RPM Alternative 30	1
UK Singles (OCC)	51
US Hot 100 Airplay	53
US Modern Rock Tracks	7
US Mainstream Rock Tracks	10

== See also ==
- List of RPM Rock/Alternative number-one singles (Canada)
