= Rob Nicholson (musician) =

American bassist (born 1969)

Blasko
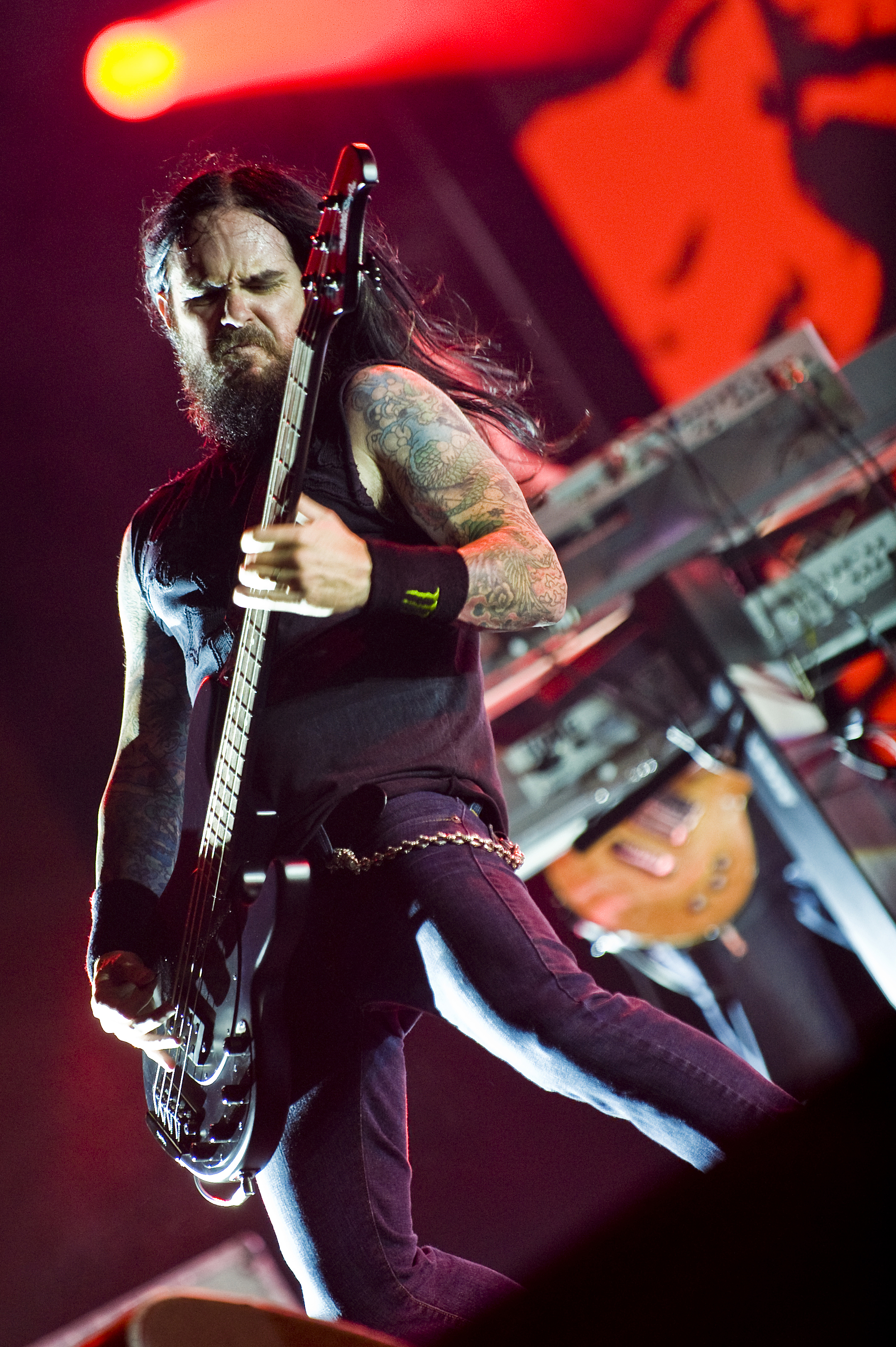
- Nicholson performing with Ozzy Osbourne in 2009

Background information
- Also known as: Rob Nicholson
- Born: November 24, 1969 (age 56); United States
- Genres: Heavy metal; alternative metal; industrial metal; hard rock
- Occupations: Musician; producer; manager
- Instruments: Bass; vocals; drums (early)
- Years active: 1984–present
- Member of: Rob Zombie
- Formerly of: Ozzy Osbourne

Rob Nicholson (born November 24, 1969) also known as Blasko, is an American bassist, musician and manager. He is the bassist and backing vocalist of Rob Zombie and former bassist for Ozzy Osbourne, and is also a manager for Black Veil Brides. He is also the former bassist of Cryptic Slaughter and live bassist for Danzig.

== Career ==
=== Cryptic Slaughter (1984–1988) ===
Nicholson began his career playing bass for the Santa Monica, California-based speed/thrash metal band Cryptic Slaughter, performing on several of their albums.

=== Drown (1993–1994) ===
Formed in 1987 by vocalist Lauren Boquette under the name Yesterday's Tear, Drown was rounded out by Nicholson (bass), Joseph Bishara (guitars/keyboards), and Todd Allen (drums).

=== Suffer (1995–1996) ===
Suffer was formed by bassist Bruce Albertson with Nicholson after leaving Drown, switching from bass to lead vocals and guitar. The lineup also featured from Drown drummer Todd Allen. Todd Allen was invited to play drums by Bruce when Johnny Hill of Funhouse left. Suffer managed to score a deal with Walt Disney Music and used the money to finance a seven-song EP, "Heads I Win, Tails You Lose", but broke up shortly after the release.

=== Killing Spree (1997) ===
Nicholson was invited to contribute lead vocals on the band's debut release, "Terror From Beyond Space", issued by Napalm Records in 1997. Killing Spree was founded by former Sickening Gore members Jerry McKenzie (guitar) and Chris Huwiler (drums), and also featured Trebor Dunn (programming) and future Body Count bassist Vince Dennis a.k.a. Vincent Price, although bass on the album is credited to Elrich Von Vader. The band never performed live.

=== Danzig (1997–1998) ===
Nicholson joined the band Danzig in September 1997, but, like his last band, he did not appear on any of their albums. He departed from the band in April 1998.

=== Rob Zombie (1998–2006, 2024-current) ===
Nicholson toured with Rob Zombie, where he began using the nickname "Blasko". He went on to play on three of Rob Zombie's solo albums (Hellbilly Deluxe, The Sinister Urge, & Educated Horses). In January 2024, Nicholson rejoined Rob Zombie's solo band. Guitarist Mike Riggs, another original member of the band, also rejoined the lineup a few years prior.

=== The Death Riders (2005) ===
While with Rob Zombie, Nicholson spent some time to work on a side project with the founder of Coffin Case, Jonny Coffin. The band was composed of Coffin on lead guitar, Daniel Gray on rhythm guitar and lead vocals, DC on drums, and Nicholson on bass. Their debut album, Soundtrack for Depression, was released via the label Horror High.

=== Ozzy Osbourne (2003–2025) ===
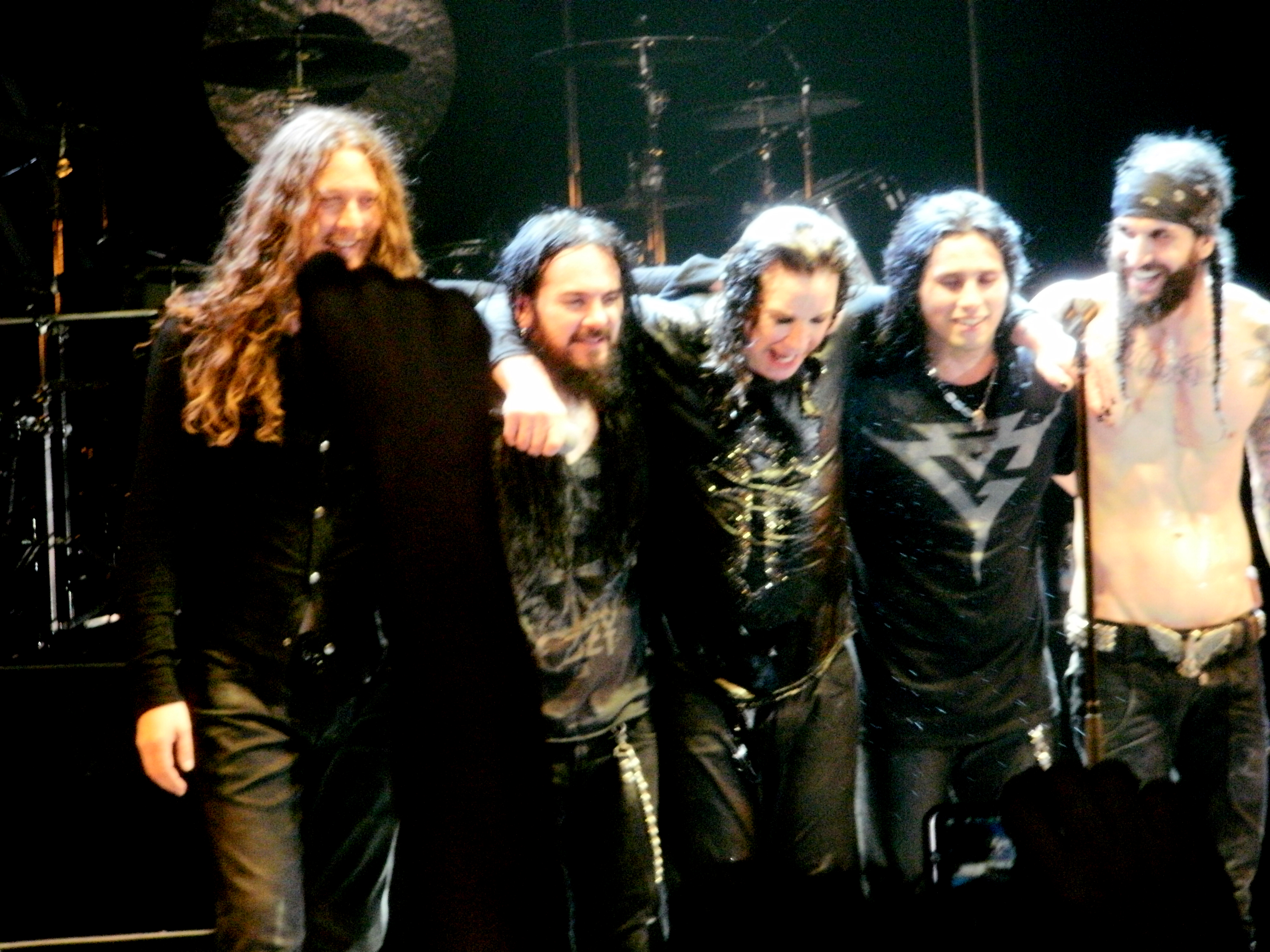
Nicholson (second from left) with Ozzy Osbourne in 2011

In 2003, Nicholson replaced Jason Newsted as Ozzy Osbourne's bassist. After Osbourne's band rehearsed for a fall tour, Osbourne was injured in a bad ATV accident in October 2003; the fall tour was cancelled. After Osbourne's recovery, Nicholson performed with Black Sabbath for Ozzfest 2004, and with Osbourne on select dates for Ozzfest 2006. Nicholson officially marked his membership in Osbourne's band when he was featured as the bassist on Osbourne's 10th studio album Black Rain, which was released on May 22, 2007. Since then, Nicholson has played for Osbourne on all live shows including Ozzfest tours, and notably on an American tour with Rob Zombie. He followed that up with Osbourne's 11th studio album, Scream, released in 2010. In 2025, Ozzy Osbourne retired from live performances, allowing Nicholson to focus on his work with Rob Zombie.

== Influences ==
His influences include heavy metal bands Iron Maiden, Motörhead, and Corrosion of Conformity.

== Side projects ==
=== Zakk Sabbath ===
Zakk Sabbath is a Black Sabbath tribute band fronted by Zakk Wylde.

=== Film ===
Nicholson worked on the 2008 film Repo! The Genetic Opera, performing on the soundtrack.

=== Management ===
Nicholson is currently the band manager of Black Veil Brides and also produced their album We Stitch These Wounds. He is the former manager of In This Moment.

== Discography ==
=== with Cryptic Slaughter ===
- 1986: Convicted
- 1987: Money Talks
- 1988: Stream of Consciousness

=== with Drown ===
- 1994: Hold On to the Hollow

=== with Suffer ===
- 1996: Heads I Win, Tails You Lose EP

=== with Killing Spree ===
- 1997: Terror from Beyond Space

=== with Rob Zombie ===
- 1998: Hellbilly Deluxe
- 2001: The Sinister Urge
- 2006: Educated Horses
- 2026: The Great Satan

=== with The Death Riders ===
- 2005: Soundtrack for Depression
- TBA: And Then Came the Rain...

=== with Ozzy Osbourne ===
- 2007: Black Rain
- 2010: Scream

=== Guest work ===
- 2008: Repo! The Genetic Opera (soundtrack)
