= City of Fire =

City of Fire may refer to:

- "City of Fire" (Thunderbirds), an episode of the TV series Thunderbirds
- City of Fire (band), a groove metal band from Canada
  - City of Fire (album), a 2010 album by the band
- City of Fire (novel), a 2002 novel by T.H. Lain

== See also ==
- City on Fire (disambiguation)
