= Trial Through Fire =

Studio album by City of Fire
- Released: April 9, 2013
- Recorded: The Factory studios in Vancouver, Canada
- Genre: Rock, heavy metal
- Length: 42:51
- Label: Shostroud Productions Inc.
- Producer: City of Fire, Sho Murray

City of Fire chronology
City of Fire (2010)	Trial Through Fire (2013)

Trial Through Fire is the second album by City of Fire, the side project of Fear Factory vocalist Burton C. Bell alongside bassist Byron Stroud (Zimmers Hole, ex-3 Inches of Blood, ex-Fear Factory, ex-Strapping Young Lad), drummer Bob Wagner and guitarist/producer Terry "Sho" Murray. The CD was recorded at The Factory studios in Vancouver, Canada.

== Musical style ==
The musical style consists of various rock genre fusions, fusing groove metal, experimental music, alternative rock, ambient music, and at times, extreme metal.

== Track listing ==
No.	Title	Length
1.	"Deliver Me"	4:41
2.	"Follow Mantis"	4:17
3.	"Bad Motivator"	3:42
4.	"Prometheus Unbound"	4:48
5.	"Olympus Mons"	4:44
6.	"Oceanaut"	3:48
7.	"Dichotomy Blues"	4:44
8.	"Made of Stars"	3:57
9.	"Steps to Redemption"	4:10
10.	"Enjoy the Silence" (Depeche Mode cover)	4:05

== Music video ==
City of Fire posted the video of the song "Bad Motivator" which was included on the album "Trial Through Fire". The video was filmed in Toronto, Canada, under the direction of Cody Calahan.

Bell said:

"The video was created through the program MuchMusic in Canada — it is Canada's MTV. Every year, they give grants to new bands to make a video. We applied and got the grant. The video was made through all Canadian videographers, directors etc... It was the first time I met Cody Calahan, and I look forward to working with him again. He is very ambitious and I like his creative ideas."

== Personnel ==
- Burton C. Bell - vocals
- Byron Stroud - bass
- Bob Wagner - drums
- Sho Murray - guitars
