= Ascension of the Watchers =

American rock band

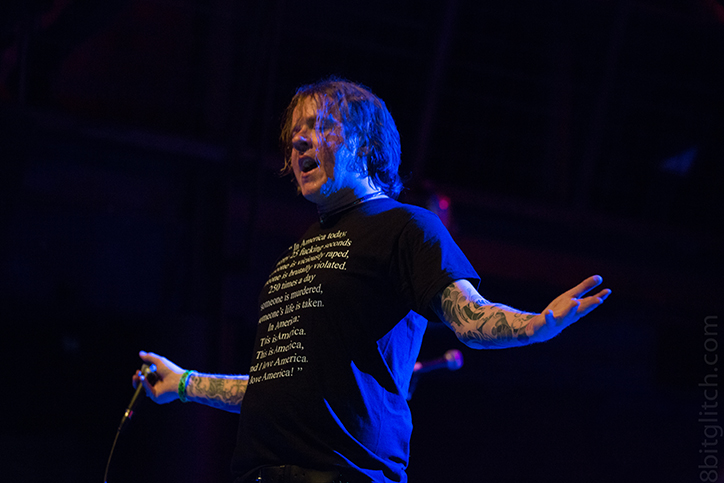
- Frontman Burton C. Bell in 2013

Background information
- Origin: Mifflinburg, Pennsylvania and New York City
- Genres: Progressive rock; gothic rock; art rock; shoegaze
- Years active: 2001–present
- Labels: 13th Planet, Dissonance
- Members: Burton C. Bell; Jayce Lewis
- Past members: John Bechdel

Ascension of the Watchers is an American rock band from Pennsylvania. It was originally formed by Burton C. Bell (Fear Factory, G/Z/R) and John Bechdel (Ministry, Fear Factory, Killing Joke, Prong, Murder, Inc.).

== Career ==
In October 2005, they headlined The Surfacing Tour with Bechdel's other band, False Icons, and Still Life Decay, a New York City industrial metal band which Burton has recorded with. A full-length album and some "special shows" were in the planning stages for 2007, according to an announcement Burton made on the official Ascension of the Watchers website in October 2006. In July 2018, Burton announced Ascension of the Watchers would be recording their second studio album titled Apocrypha, originally named Stormcrow. The band also announced the addition of Welsh solo artist Jayce Lewis who also produced and mixed the new album at his studio in Wales.

=== 2005: Iconoclast ===
Following the departure of Burton C. Bell from metal band Fear Factory due to internal disputes, Bell announced the release of his debut EP/mini album Iconoclast in June 2005 with long time friend John Bechdel originally released as a 12" vinyl, the EP was written and recorded at Bechdel's home in rural Pennsylvania.

=== 2020: Apocrypha ===
In 2018, Burton C. Bell announced the recording of a new album with a working title Stormcrow. Following a successful Pledgemusic campaign, Bell teamed up with Solo artist Jayce Lewis to produce and mix the new album, during recording Pledgemusic announced a liquidation order leaving the band no option but to continue, later announcing the signing to Dissonance Records with an album release date of October 9, 2020.

== Line-up ==
- Burton C. Bell – guitars, vocals (2001--present)
- Jayce Lewis - drums, programming (2018--present)

=== Live members ===
- Scott Irvine – bass (2005–2006)
- Fade Kainer – drums (2005–2006)
- Edu Mussi – guitars (2005–2020)
- John Bechdel – keyboards, programming (2004–2021)
- Alex Terhune – bass (2008)
- Bones Padilla – drums (2008)

== Discography ==
- Iconoclast (demo – 2004 – self-released)
- Numinosum (LP – 2008 – 13th Planet Records)
- Apocrypha (LP – 2020 – Dissonance Records)
- Translations (Double LP – 2021 – Dissonance Records)
