= Apartment 26 =

British metal band

- Apartment 26, 2000

Background information
- Origin: Leamington Spa, England
- Genres: Industrial metal; nu metal; alternative metal
- Years active: 1998–2004
- Labels: Hollywood; Atlantic; Murph
- Past members: Terence "Biff" Butler; Jon Greasley; Louis Cruden; Andy "A.C." Huckvale; Kevin Temple; Jeremy Colson; Brad Booker

Apartment 26 were a nu metal/industrial metal band from Leamington Spa, England, formed in 1998. They released two albums on the major labels Hollywood Records and Atlantic Records, Hallucinating and Music for the Massive respectively. After being dropped from Atlantic Records, Apartment 26 disbanded in late 2004.

== History ==
=== Formation and Within EP (1998–1999) ===
Apartment 26 were formed in 1998 by vocalist Terence "Biff" Butler, guitarist Jon Greasley, bassist Louis Cruden, and keyboardist Andy "A.C." Huckvale. The band name was taken from the David Lynch film Eraserhead. Also notably, Butler is the son of Black Sabbath bassist Geezer Butler. The band were influenced by older acts such as Black Sabbath, but also had embraced bands such as Nine Inch Nails, Deftones, The Prodigy, Tool, Fear Factory, among others. The band recorded a rough demo in 1998, which then found its way to Gravity Kills member Doug Firley. Firley was the keyboardist and programmer in Gravity Kills, but had also helped produce his band's full-length albums. Firley then agreed to produce Apartment 26's debut EP, titled Within. The EP consisted of five tracks: three songs were later re-recorded for the band's debut album, one song ("Dystopia") was later re-recorded for a soundtrack, and one song ("Random Thinking") remained exclusive to the EP.

=== Initial exposure with Hallucinating (1999–2002) ===
In 1999, Apartment 26 added drummer Kevin Temple to the lineup so that live drums could be incorporated alongside Huckvale's programming. Temple was formerly a member of Die Warzau and Sister Machine Gun. Apartment 26 embarked as part of the lineup for the 1999 version of Ozzfest, and the band gained more exposure as a result. Major label Hollywood Records then signed the band afterwards. Shortly after Ozzfest concluded, Apartment 26 then went on various tours with Powerman 5000, Staind, Rollins Band, and Sevendust. The band then went through a rigorous recording process for their debut album, which was strained by the exhaustive touring schedule and by living together. One song from the sessions, "Dystopia", was included on the soundtrack for the film Heavy Metal 2000 prior to the album's release. The result was Hallucinating, released in May 2000. The album was produced by Ulrich Wild, who was known for his production work with industrial bands such as Stabbing Westward, Static-X, Powerman 5000, and others.

The single "Basic Breakdown" was the band's first breakthrough hit, as it peaked at No. 33 on the Billboard Mainstream Rock chart and had lingered on the chart for six weeks. "Backwards" was also released as a single from the album and also appeared on the soundtrack for the film Mission: Impossible 2. Both "Basic Breakdown" and "Backwards" also appeared in the PlayStation fighting game Gekido: Urban Fighters in 2000. The band promoted Hallucinating by touring with Disturbed, followed by appearing on the 2000 edition of Ozzfest. In late 2000, drummer Temple had left the band. Jeremy Colson was added to the lineup and in early 2001, they toured England with Pitchshifter and then Papa Roach.

Hallucinating had a delayed release for Europe, January 2001. The European version featured a bonus track ("Void"), which featured Fear Factory vocalist Burton C. Bell as a guest. Apartment 26 then appeared at the United Kingdom edition of Ozzfest in 2001, their third year in a row. Towards the end of 2001, Colson had parted ways from the band, and a replacement was not immediately named. In the spring of 2002, Hollywood Records and Apartment 26 amicably parted ways while the band recorded their second album.

=== Cancelled Detachment album, Music for the Massive, and dissolution (2002–2004) ===
During the period without a drummer, the band recorded an album (with Huckvale programming the drums) that ultimately attracted no interest from labels, and was never released, with fans dubbing it Album 1.5 or "the lost album"; Greasley would later say that "it would have made sense as a bridge [album]" and "some people would have been less shocked by how Music for the Massive sounded." The album was tentatively titled Detachment, and was initially set for a 2003 release, with Charlie Clouser, Jason Slater, and Troy Van Leeuwen producing.

In July 2002, it was announced that Brad Booker from the band Stir had joined on drums. His first show with Apartment 26 was when the band served as openers for Stone Sour. Apartment 26 continued to work on their second album through the remainder of 2002 and throughout 2003. The band then signed with major label Atlantic Records for the album. They extensively toured the United Kingdom at the end of 2003 with a mixture of headlining shows and opening for Evanescence. Music for the Massive was released in February 2004 and it was co-produced with Tchad Blake. "88" was released as a promotional single for the album. The lead single was "Give Me More", and it peaked at No. 39 on the Billboard Mainstream Rock chart. Music for the Massive was not heavily promoted and Atlantic Records dropped the band merely three months after the album's release. Apartment 26 then formally announced that they had broken up towards the end of 2004.

== Members ==
=== Final line-up ===
- Terence "Biff" Butler – vocals (1998–2004)
- Jon Greasley – guitar (1998–2004)
- Louis Cruden – bass (1998–2004)
- Andy "A.C." Huckvale – keyboards, programming (1998–2004)
- Brad Booker – drums (2002–2004)

=== Former members ===
- Kevin Temple – drums (1999–2000)
- Jeremy Colson – drums (2000–2001)

== Discography ==
=== Albums ===
- Hallucinating (2000, Hollywood Records)
- Music for the Massive (2004, Atlantic Records)

=== EPs ===
- Within (1999, Murph Records)

=== Singles ===
Year	Title	Chart positions	Album
Year	Title	US Main. Rock	Album
2000	"Basic Breakdown"	33	Hallucinating
2000	"Backwards"	—	Hallucinating
2003	"88"	—	Music for the Massive
2004	"Give Me More"	39	Music for the Massive

=== Appearances ===
- Megadeth Risk Extra Value CD (pre-order sampler, 1999)
- Heavy Metal 2000 (soundtrack, 2000)
- High Fidelity (soundtrack, 2000)
- Tales from the Crypt: Monsters of Metal (compilation, 2000)
- Mission: Impossible 2 (soundtrack, 2000)
- Ozzfest 2000 (tour sampler, 2000)
- PacSun Core Sampler V1 (store sampler, 2000)
- Gekido: Urban Fighters (soundtrack, 2000)
- Metal Hammer: February 2001 (magazine sampler, 2001)
- Rage #1 (magazine sampler, 2001)
- Metal Hammer: December 2003 (magazine sampler, 2003)
