= We Are the Others =

2012 studio album by Delain

Studio album by Delain
- Released: 1 June 2012
- Recorded: 2011
- Studio: TriPod Studios and Atlantis Studios, Stockholm, Sweden
- Genre: Symphonic metal
- Length: 47:36
- Label: CNR Music/Roadrunner; Sensory (US)
- Producer: Jacob Hellner, Fredrik Thomander, Anders "Gary" Wikström, Delain

Delain studio album chronology
April Rain (2009)	We Are the Others (2012)	The Human Contradiction (2014)

Singles from We Are the Others
- 1. "Get the Devil Out of Me" Released: 13 April 2012; 2. "We Are the Others" Released: 11 September 2012

Professional ratings
Review scores
Source	Rating
AllMusic	3.5/5 stars
About.com	3.5/5 stars
Metal Forces	6/5/10

We Are the Others is the third studio album by the Dutch symphonic metal band Delain. It was released in the Benelux and Germany on 1 June 2012 and in the United Kingdom and France on 4 June by CNR Music, who took over Delain when Warner Music refused to release We Are the Others. The album was released in the US on 3 July. The first single, "Get the Devil Out of Me", was released on 13 April. The second single "We Are The Others" and its video was released on 11 September 2012. This is the first album by Delain without any studio songs with guest vocalist Marko Hietala. Live versions of "The Gathering" and "Control the Storm" are featured on the special edition of the album with Hietala singing his parts live.

== History ==
During their 2011 live shows, Delain debuted three new songs from the album – "Manson" (which was later renamed to "Mother Machine"), "Get the Devil Out of Me" and "Milk and Honey".

In an interview with Sonic Cathedral, vocalist Charlotte Wessels discussed the inspiration she drew from the Sophie Lancaster case:

I remember when I first heard about it … it wasn't on Dutch news, I just heard about it through Internet networks and the goth scene … there was this movie made about it, a short film of about four minutes. I saw it, and I just cried. It's so incredibly sad! After seeing the movie, I didn't really DO anything with it until we were working on "We Are the Others." But the basic idea of the lyrics was there. It was just supposed to be a song about "we are the others" and a feeling of togetherness. On the one hand, being proud of whoever you are, whether you divert from the norm in whatever way you divert from the norm. But on the other hand, it is also kind of a song for "others". We just wanted a song about acceptance.

— Charlotte Wessels, SonicCathedral.com interview

Originally intended for release in early 2012, the album's release date was unknown after Warner Music's purchase of Roadrunner Records but it was announced via a Facebook message on the band official page that the album would be released on 1 June 2012 with the album's first single, "Get the Devil Out of Me", being released on 13 April 2012. The song was released for listening online on 3 April on their official website. The second single from the album was announced as the title track, "We Are the Others", and a music video was filmed. Several well-known personalities from the metal scene appear in this video, such as George Oosthoek, Sharon den Adel, Robert Westerholt and ex-member Rob van der Loo.

== Track listing ==
All lyrics by Charlotte Wessels and Charlotte Wessels/Tripod

No.	Title	Music	Length
1.	"Mother Machine"	Martijn Westerholt, Charlotte Wessels, Guus Eikens, Tripod	4:34
2.	"Electricity"	Westerholt, Wessels, Eikens, Tripod	4:14
3.	"We Are the Others"	Westerholt, Wessels, Tripod	3:17
4.	"Milk and Honey"	Westerholt, Wessels, Eikens, Tripod	4:26
5.	"Hit Me with Your Best Shot"	Westerholt, Wessels, Eikens, Tripod	3:59
6.	"I Want You"	Wessels, Eikens, Tripod	4:52
7.	"Where Is the Blood"	Westerholt, Wessels, Eikens, Tripod	3:16
8.	"Generation Me"	Westerholt, Wessels, Tripod	3:43
9.	"Babylon"	Westerholt, Wessels, Eikens, Tripod	4:06
10.	"Are You Done with Me"	Wessels, Eikens, Tripod	3:05
11.	"Get the Devil Out of Me"	Westerholt, Wessels, Eikens, Tripod	3:21
12.	"Not Enough"	Westerholt, Wessels, Tripod	4:43

Special edition bonus tracks
No.	Title	Writer(s)	Length
13.	"The Gathering" (Live, featuring Marko Hietala)	Eikens	4:01
14.	"Control the Storm" (Live, featuring Marko Hietala)	Eikens, Wessels	4:14
15.	"Shattered" (Live)	Westerholt	4:20
16.	"Sleepwalker's Dream" (Live)	Westerholt, Wessels	4:33

Japanese edition bonus track
No.	Title	Writer(s)	Length
17.	"Come Closer" (Live)	Westerholt, Wessels	4:33

== Personnel ==
=== Delain ===
- Charlotte Wessels – vocals
- Martijn Westerholt – keyboards
- Timo Somers – lead guitar, ambient guitar
- Otto Schimmelpenninck van der Oije – bass
- Sander Zoer – drums

=== Additional musicians ===
- Guus Eikens – rhythm guitar
- Oliver Philipps – lead guitar, ambient guitar, keyboards and vocals arrangements
- Henka Johansson – additional drums
- Burton C. Bell – guest vocals on "Where Is the Blood"
- Anders "Gary" Wikström – backing vocals

=== Production ===
- TriPod (Jacob Hellner, Fredrik Thomander, Anders Wikström) – producers, mixing
- Tom van Heesch – engineer, mixing
- Ulf Kruckenberg – engineer
- Svante Forsbäch – mastering

== Charts ==
Chart	Peak position
Dutch Albums Chart	4
Dutch Alternative Top 30	1
Belgian Ultratop (Wallonia)	99
Belgian Ultratop (Flanders)	82
UK Albums Chart	75
UK Rock Chart	3
Swiss Albums Chart	43
German Albums Chart	77
French Albums Chart	81
Japanese Albums Chart	221
US Heatseeker Albums	23
