= Ohmwork =

Studio album by GZR
- Released: May 10, 2005
- Recorded: Shock City Music Work
- Genre: Nu metal, groove metal
- Label: Sanctuary Records
- Producer: Geezer Butler

GZR chronology
| Black Science (1997) | Ohmwork (2005) |

Professional ratings
Review scores
| Source | Rating |
|---|---|
| AllMusic | 2.5/5 stars |

Ohmwork is the third and final studio album by American heavy metal band GZR. It was originally released on May 10, 2005, in the United States and on May 9, 2005, in the United Kingdom. The album is the first to feature Chad Smith on drums, replacing Deen Castronovo from the band's previous album Black Science. The artwork was done by Lawrence Azarad of LAdesign.

== Track listing ==
1. "Misfit" – 3:24
2. "Pardon My Depression" – 4:38
3. "Prisoner 103" – 3:09
4. "I Believe" – 6:55
5. "Aural Sects" – 4:36
6. "Pseudocide" – 2:30
7. "Pull the String" – 3:50
8. "Alone" – 4:38
9. "Dogs of Whore" – 5:03
10. "Don't You Know" – 4:57

== Credits ==
- Geezer Butler – bass guitar
- Pedro Howse – guitar
- Clark Brown – vocals
- Chad Smith – drums
- Lisa Rieffel – vocals on "Pseudocide"
- Produced by Geezer Butler
- Engineered by Jason McEntire
- Additional engineering by Chris Hughes
- Recorded at Shock City Music Work
- Mixed by Toby Wright
- Assisted by James Musshom
- Mixed at Skip Saylor Recording
- Mastered by Stephen Marcussen at Marcusen Mastering LLC
- All songs written by Butler/Howse/Brown.
