= Burton C. Bell =

American heavy metal vocalist

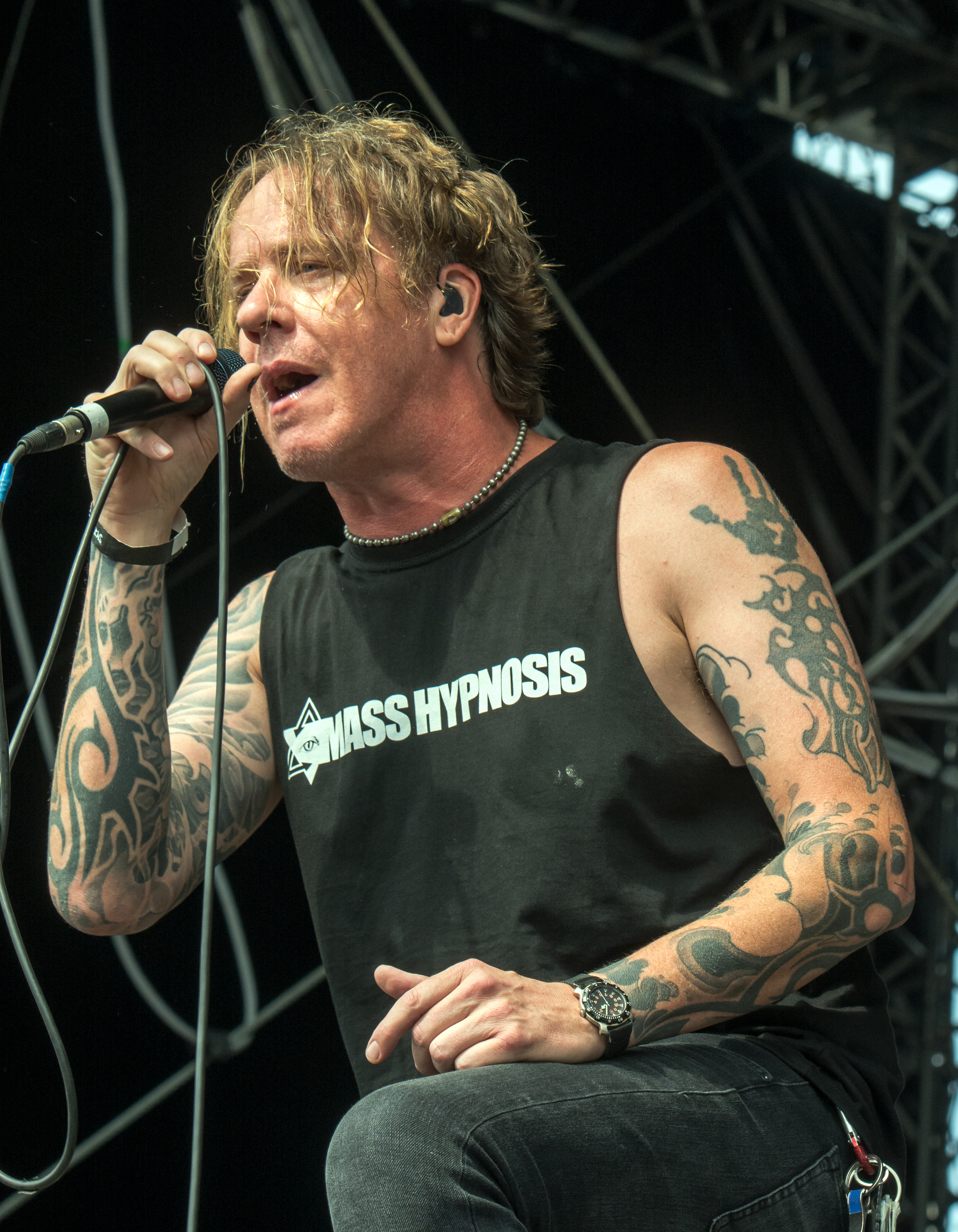
- Bell performing with Fear Factory in 2016

Background information
- Born: February 19, 1969 (age 57); Houston, Texas, U.S.
- Genre: Heavy metal • Industrial metal • Death metal
- Occupations: Singer; songwriter
- Years active: 1988–present
- Member of: Ascension of the Watchers
- Formerly of: Fear Factory; GZR; City of Fire; Ministry
- Website: burtoncbell.com

Burton Christopher Bell (born February 19, 1969) is an American musician. He is best known as the co-founder and former frontman of the industrial metal band Fear Factory. Until 2021 he was the only member to perform on all of the band's albums. His singing style mixes clean and shouted vocals with death growls.

== Career ==
=== Fear Factory ===
Prior to his role in Fear Factory, Bell was in the band Hateface. In 1989, after Hateface disbanded, his housemate Dino Cazares invited him to meet a drummer (Raymond Herrera) to possibly work with. On October 31, 1990, Bell, Cazares, Herrera and Romero jammed for the first time in a studio in South Los Angeles. The group recorded four studio albums before Fear Factory disbanded temporarily in 2002. The band reformed in 2004 with Christian Olde Wolbers switching from bass to guitar and Byron Stroud on bass. This line-up recorded two albums. During the following period of inactivity within the band, Cazares and Bell patched up their differences, and in 2009 decided to have Fear Factory return to form.

Bell is the only member to have appeared on every Fear Factory release from their first demo in 1991 to their tenth studio album Aggression Continuum (2021).

In 2012, Bell and Cazares received the Revolver Golden Gods Icon award.

After 31 years as the singer of Fear Factory, Bell announced on September 28, 2020 that he had left the band, citing "consistent series of dishonest representations and unfounded accusations from past and present band members" and a bitter feud between himself and Cazares. However, his vocals appear on their tenth studio album Aggression Continuum, which had been completed in 2017 but not released until 2021.

On June 16 2021, Bell performed the Fear Factory song "Replica" with a group of Australian musicians in Sydney. This happened after he'd done a DJ set at a local venue.

=== Ascension of the Watchers ===
After Fear Factory's hiatus in 2002, Bell went on to form Ascension of the Watchers with John Bechdel at Bechdel's studio in Mifflinburg, Pennsylvania. The Watchers released an online-only EP titled Iconoclast in 2005. On February 19, 2008, Ascension of the Watchers released their first full-length album Numinosum through Ministry frontman Al Jourgensen's record label 13th Planet.

In February 2017, Bell rebooted Ascension of the Watchers and began recording at Northstone Studios, South Wales, collaborating with Welsh solo artist Jayce Lewis. With Bell regarding Lewis as a "musical soulmate", the pair recorded a new album titled Apocrypha and released it via Dissonance Productions.

=== Guest appearances ===
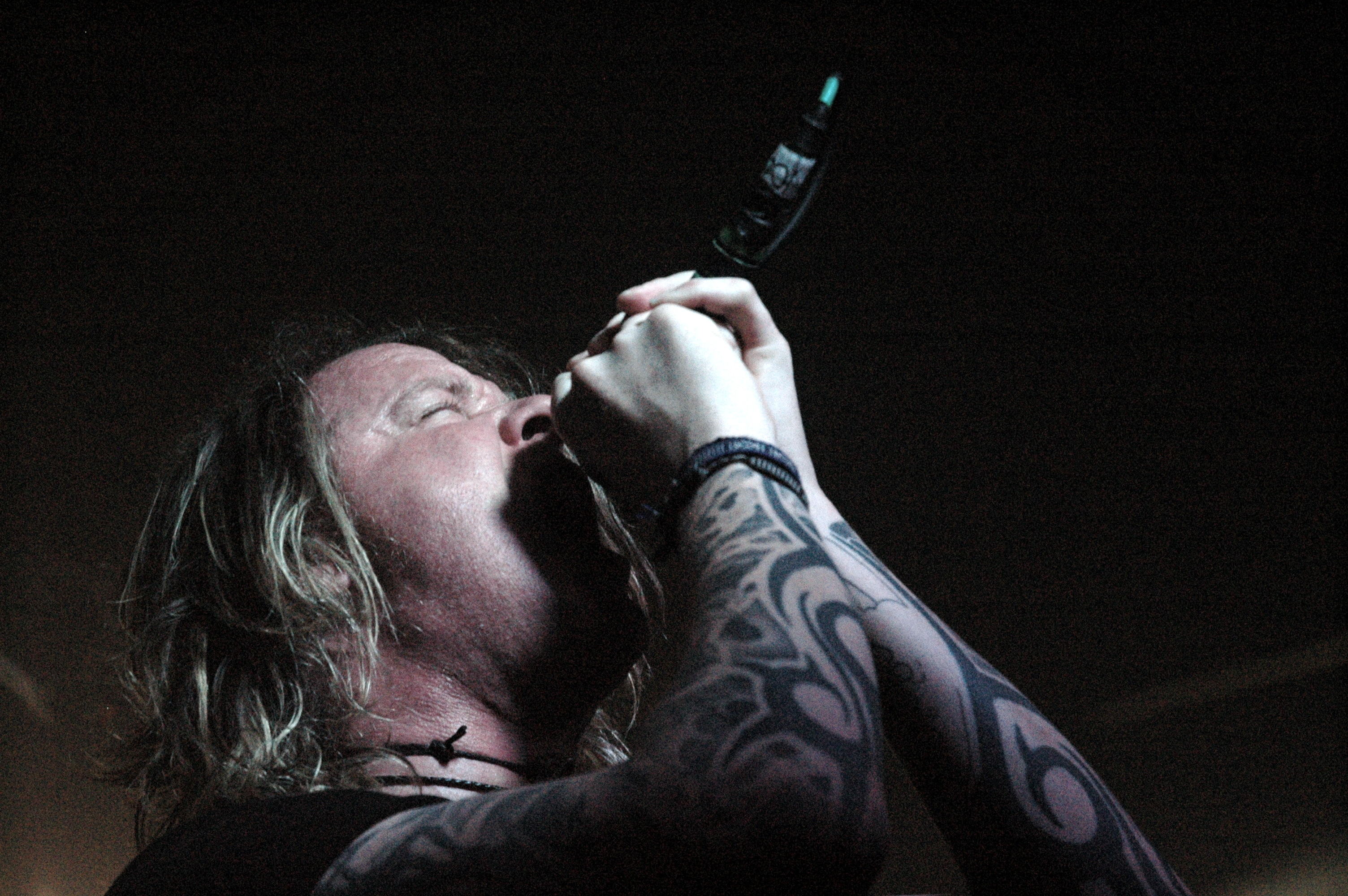
Bell performing

Bell has performed guest vocals on many records in addition to taking lead vocal duties for G/Z/R's Plastic Planet album released in 1995. Due to commitments with Fear Factory, Bell was not the vocalist for G/Z/R's second album, Black Science.

Bell, alongside fellow bandmate, Dino Cazares, appeared on the Soulfly song "Eye for an Eye" in 1998. Bell featured as guest vocalist on the Apartment 26 song "Void", a bonus track from their debut album Hallucinating in 2000.

Bell recorded a track for UK metal band This Is Menace; the track was then cut out of the final edit from the album No End in Sight. Bell performed live in the encore segments of the Ministry 2008 Tour, singing songs such as "Stigmata", "Thieves" and "So What", taking over vocal duties from Al Jourgensen.

Bell joined with Byron Stroud to form City of Fire who released their debut album in August 2009.

Bell featured on Delain's 2012 album We Are the Others, providing vocals for the track "Where Is the Blood".

Bell was featured on Chris Vrenna's project Tweaker on the song "I Am the One", intended to appear on the album The Attraction to All Things Uncertain. When Vrenna reedited the album, Bell's song was cut only to be included in a DVD instead.

Bell provided backing vocals on the 20th anniversary re-recording of Pitchshifter's "Un-United Kingdom".

Bell from 2017-2018 did guest vocals on AmeriKKKant by Ministry.

== Personal life ==
Bell has three children and is married.

== Discography ==
All appearances are as a vocalist, unless mentioned otherwise.

Band	Release date	Title
Fear Factory	1992	Soul of a New Machine
Fear Factory	1995	Demanufacture
Clay People – guest	1995	The Iron Icon
G/Z/R	1995	Plastic Planet
Fear Factory	1998	Obsolete
Spineshank – guest	1998	Strictly Diesel
Kilgore – guest	1998	A Search for Reason
Soulfly – guest	1998	Soulfly
Static-X – guest	2000	The Crow: Salvation
Apartment 26 – guest	2000	Hallucinating
Fear Factory	2001	Digimortal
Fear Factory	2004	Archetype
Fear Factory	2005	Transgression
Ascension of the Watchers	2005	Iconoclast (EP)
Soil – guest	2006	True Self
Ministry – guest	2007	The Last Sucker
Ministry – guest	2007	Cover Up
Ascension of the Watchers	2008	Numinosum
M.A.N – guest	2008	Peacenemy
City of Fire	2009	City of Fire
Fear Factory	2010	Mechanize
Delain – guest	2012	We Are the Others
Fear Factory	2012	The Industrialist
City of Fire	2013	Trial Through Fire
Fear Factory	2015	Genexus
Ministry – guest	2018	AmeriKKKant
DevilDriver – guest	2018	Dad's Gonna Kill Me
Conflict – guest	2019	Decision Code
Combichrist – guest	2019	One Fire
Pitchshifter – guest	2020	Un-United Kingdom 20th Anniversary Brexit Edition
Revillusion – guest	2020	Heart (Less): Revisions & Additions
Ascension of the Watchers	2020	Apocrypha
Fear Factory	2021	Aggression Continuum
Burton C. Bell	2024	Anti-Droid (single)
Burton C. Bell	2024	Technical Exorcism (single)
Burton C. Bell	2025	Savages (single)
