= Plastic Planet =

Studio album by GZR
- Released: October 16, 1995
- Genre: Alternative metal, industrial metal, groove metal
- Length: 47:18
- Label: TVT

GZR chronology
Plastic Planet (1995)	Black Science (1997)

Professional ratings
Review scores
Source	Rating
AllMusic	2.5/5 stars

Plastic Planet is the debut studio album by GZR (known at the time as g//z/r), a heavy metal band featuring Geezer Butler of Black Sabbath. The album also features Fear Factory vocalist Burton C. Bell.

== Album information ==
The song "Giving Up the Ghost" was lyrically directed at Tony Iommi and his continuation of the Black Sabbath name at the time. "Detective 27" indirectly references Batman whose first appearance in 1939 was in DC Comics' Detective Comics #27.

The song "The Invisible" was featured on the soundtrack to the 1995 film Mortal Kombat, although the song did not appear in the film itself. The artist on the album was listed as "Geezer" instead of "g//z/r".

Samples from the British TV movie The Woman in Black can be heard on "Séance Fiction".

Although no commercial single was released, a CD promotional EP was issued by TVT Records in the USA (catalogue TVT 6014-2P), with full colour inserts. The track list of this was 1) Cycle of Sixty (radio mix) 2) X13 (radio mix) 3) Drive Boy Shooting (live) 4) Detective 27 (live) 5) House Of Clouds (live). The live tracks were recorded at Majestic Theater in Detroit in February 1996.

== Track listing ==
All songs written by Geezer Butler and Pedro Howse.

1. "Catatonic Eclipse" – 6:10
2. "Drive Boy, Shooting" – 4:17
3. "Giving Up the Ghost" – 5:12
4. "Plastic Planet" – 4:19
5. "The Invisible" – 3:43
6. "Seance Fiction" – 5:55
7. "House of Clouds" – 3:43
8. "Detective 27" – 3:09
9. "X13" – 4:05
10. "Sci-Clone" – 3:43
11. "Cycle of Sixty" – 3:02

Japan edition bonus tracks

1. "Drive Boy, Shooting (live)" – 4:14
2. "Detective 27 (live)" – 3:10
3. "House of Clouds (live)" – 3:35

== Personnel ==
- Geezer Butler – bass guitar, keyboards, vocals
- Burton C. Bell – vocals
- Pedro Howse – guitar
- Deen Castronovo – drums
