= City on Fire =

City on Fire may refer to:

== Film and TV ==
- City on Fire (1979 film), a 1979 Canadian disaster film
- City on Fire (1987 film), a 1987 Hong Kong action film
- City on Fire (1993 film), a 1993 Taiwan action film
- City on Fire (TV series), a 2023 crime drama television series
- "City on Fire" (Desperate Housewives)

== Literature ==
- City on Fire (Williams novel), a 1997 fantasy novel by Walter Jon Williams
- City on Fire (Hallberg novel), a 2015 novel by Garth Risk Hallberg
- City on Fire (Winslow novel), a 2022 novel by Don Winslow
- City on Fire (Dapiran book), a 2020 nonfiction book by Antony Dapiran about the 2019 Hong Kong protests

== Music ==
- "City on Fire", a song from the album Prophet by Swedish rock band Jerusalem.
- "A City on Fire", a 2009 song by Fightstar
- "City on Fire", a song from the musical Sweeney Todd: The Demon Barber of Fleet Street

== See also ==
- City of Fire (disambiguation)
