= Music for the Massive =

Music For The Massive

Studio album by Apartment 26
- Released: February 24, 2004
- Genres: Alternative rock; hard rock; pop rock; ska
- Length: 51:32
- Label: Atlantic
- Producer: Tchad Blake

Apartment 26 chronology
Hallucinating (2000)	Music For The Massive (2004)

Singles from Music for the Massive
- 1. "88" Released: 2003; 2. "Give Me More" Released: 2003

Music for the Massive is the second and final album by British industrial metal band Apartment 26, before the band were dropped by Atlantic Records in 2004.

== Reception ==
Professional ratings
Review scores
Source	Rating
AllMusic	1.5/5 stars
Ultimate Guitar	9.3/10

The album received a positive review from Sputnik Music, which stated that the album is "very enjoyable".

== Track listing ==
No.	Title	Length
1.	"Give Me More"	3:41
2.	"88"	4:20
3.	"Strike"	3:18
4.	"Stupid World"	3:01
5.	"5 Day Rental"	4:08
6.	"Book (Be My Friend)"	3:33
7.	"New Year's Resolution"	3:43
8.	"Kick to the Head"	4:20
9.	"Summer"	4:30
10.	"Close Your Eyes"	3:25
11.	"Heaven"	4:35
12.	"Axel Off"	3:34
26.	"(Resolve)" (Tracks 13-25 are silent and each one is 0:04 Long)	4:30
Total length:		51:27

No.	Title	Length
1.	"Video1 Intro"	0:05
2.	"Video2 Give Me More"	3:39
3.	"Video3 Untitled Documentary"	7:55
Total length:		11:39

== Personnel ==
- Terrance "Biff" Butler – vocals
- Jon Greasley – guitar
- Louis Cruden – bass
- Andy "A.C". Huckvale – programming, keyboard
- Brad Brooker – drums
- Clime Lemeure – additional vocals on Track 5
- Wham-O – additional vocals on Track 6

=== Additional personnel ===
- Thomas Lewis, Edward Lewis – art direction
- Dan Leffler – engineer (assisted)
