= Get the Devil Out of Me =

2012 single by Delain

Single by Delain

from the album We Are the Others
- Released: 13 April 2012
- Recorded: 2011
- Studio: Hellner Studios
- Genre: Symphonic metal
- Length: 3:20
- Label: CNR Music
- Songwriter(s): Martijn Westerholt, Charlotte Wessels, Guus Eikens, Tripod
- Producer(s): Jacob Hellner, Fredrik Thomander, Anders Wikström

Delain singles chronology
"Nothing Left" (2010)	"Get the Devil Out of Me" (2012)	"We Are the Others" (2012)

"Get the Devil Out of Me" is a song by the Dutch symphonic metal band Delain. Taken from the album We Are the Others, the single has been available for purchase online as of 13 April 2012. Vinyl versions of the single were also given out to fans at the release party for the band's third album, We Are the Others, with the purchase of the album.

== Music video ==
The music video for "Get the Devil Out of Me'" was revealed on 20 April 2012. The video features footage from the recording sessions for the new album and live material, including footage from the UK Sonisphere Festival in 2010 used with the permission of BlinkTV.
