= Hallucinating (album) =

Studio album by Apartment 26
- Released: May 2000
- Studios: NRG Recording Studio, North Hollywood, California
- Genres: Nu metal; industrial metal; industrial rock; drum and bass
- Producer: Ulrich Wild

Apartment 26 chronology
| Hallucinating (2000) | Music for the Massive (2004) |

Hallucinating is the debut studio album by British industrial metal band Apartment 26.

== Artwork ==
The album artwork was created by P. R. Brown; according to Jon Greasley, the model originally meant to have a gas mask on, but it was eventually decided it was too common of a motif at the time.

== Reception ==
Professional ratings
Review scores
| Source | Rating |
|---|---|
| AllMusic | 2/5 stars |
| Kerrang! | 4/5 stars |

CanEHdian.com stated that the band fails to "stand out from all the other bands that fall into this genre of music".

== Track listing ==
| No. | Title | Length |
|---|---|---|
| 1. | "Backwards" | 3:09 |
| 2. | "Doing It Anyway" | 3:50 |
| 3. | "Slicedbeats" | 3:39 |
| 4. | "Keep You" | 4:08 |
| 5. | "Apt. 26" | 3:14 |
| 6. | "Dusk" | 0:27 |
| 7. | "Hallucinating" | 3:38 |
| 8. | "The Fear" | 3:36 |
| 9. | "Basic Breakdown" | 3:31 |
| 10. | "Anymore" | 3:06 |
| 11. | "Bruised" | 3:52 |
| 12. | "Evils" | 0:35 |
| 13. | "Question of Reality" | 3:16 |
| 14. | "Death" | 4:42 |
| 15. | "Void" (Bonus track only on European version) | 3:55 |
| 26. | "Untitled hidden track" (tracks 15 to 24 are composed of 16 seconds of audio feedback each, and 25 18 seconds) | 2:19 |

== Personnel ==
- Terrance "Biff" Butler – vocals
- Jon Greasley – guitar
- Louis Cruden – bass
- Andy "A.C". Huckvale – programming, keyboards
- Kevin Temple – drums
- Burton C. Bell - guest vocals on bonus track Void (15) on European version

=== Other personnel ===
- P. R. Brown - art direction
