= Jayce Lewis =

Welsh musician

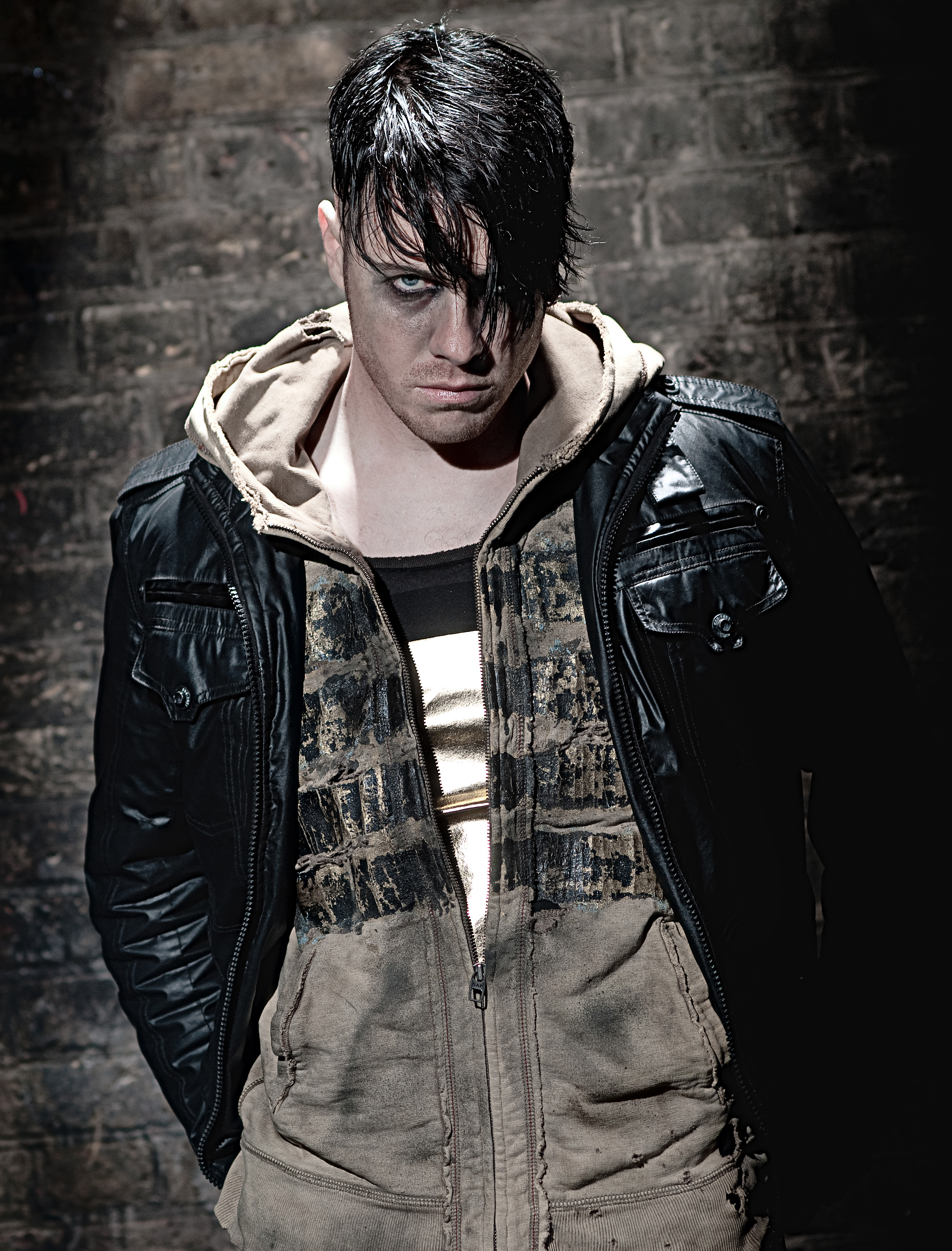
- Lewis in 2019

Background information
- Born: Jason Charles Lewis; 29 September 1984 (age 42); Bridgend, Wales
- Genres: Alternative rock; industrial; synth-pop; electronica
- Occupation: Musician
- Instruments: Drums; guitar; keyboards; vocals
- Years active: 2004–present
- Labels: EMI Music; Virgin Records; Universal Music Group
- Website: jaycelewis.com

Jason Charles Lewis known professionally as Jayce Lewis (born 29 September 1984) is a Welsh musician from Bridgend, South Wales. In 2009 his self-produced single titled "Icon" (also included on EMI Records' Smash Hits 2009 compilation) achieved a top-10 chart position alongside VH1/MTV Asia Viacom18 features. With strong industrial music and synth-pop influences, his music has been described as alternative rock with electronica roots and "tribal percussion". Lewis has collaborated with acts such as Queen, Rammstein and synth-pop icon Gary Numan, for whom Lewis has been a supporting act three times.

== Early years and influences ==
Growing up in Bridgend - Wales, Lewis began by learning to play guitar at the age of six. He was influenced by Brian May of Queen and Igor Cavalera of Sepultura.

Lewis is a keen follower of dance and tribal music which he incorporates into his solo work.

== Career ==
Previously employed as a fabricator and welder, Lewis forged a professional music career following the release of his self-produced 2009 single "Icon", a hit in Asia and later well received in Europe. He signed a five-year deal to EMI Records Europe and Asia on 4 September 2009, and counts cymbal manufacturer Paiste among his professional sponsors.

With his long-time friend and promoter David Prowse (the actor who portrayed Darth Vader in the original Star Wars trilogy) as manager, Lewis formed a live touring band with a group of friends, and designed and manufactured his own live set production.

=== "Icon", 2009 ===
His self-produced solo single "Icon" was released in summer 2009, on EMI Records. It was heavily featured on VH1 and MTV Asia, resulting in him being artist of the month and becoming the headlining act of VH1 India Global Express Tour, covering four cities across India. "Icon" had a European release in 2010 and was also featured on Kerrang TV together with high rotations features on Scuzz's including a two-hour take over.

The album's lyrics touch on several subject matters inspired by Lewis's life experiences.

In 2009 Lewis found success following air-time in Asian territories and his broader concert touring, including Europe and North America. In February 2010, he headlined the Rock 'N India festival, which hosted events in New Delhi and Bangalore, alongside popular artists such as the Backstreet Boys and Richard Marx. Lewis was presented a DNA Artist of the Festival award plaque by the event's founder, Venkat Vardhan.

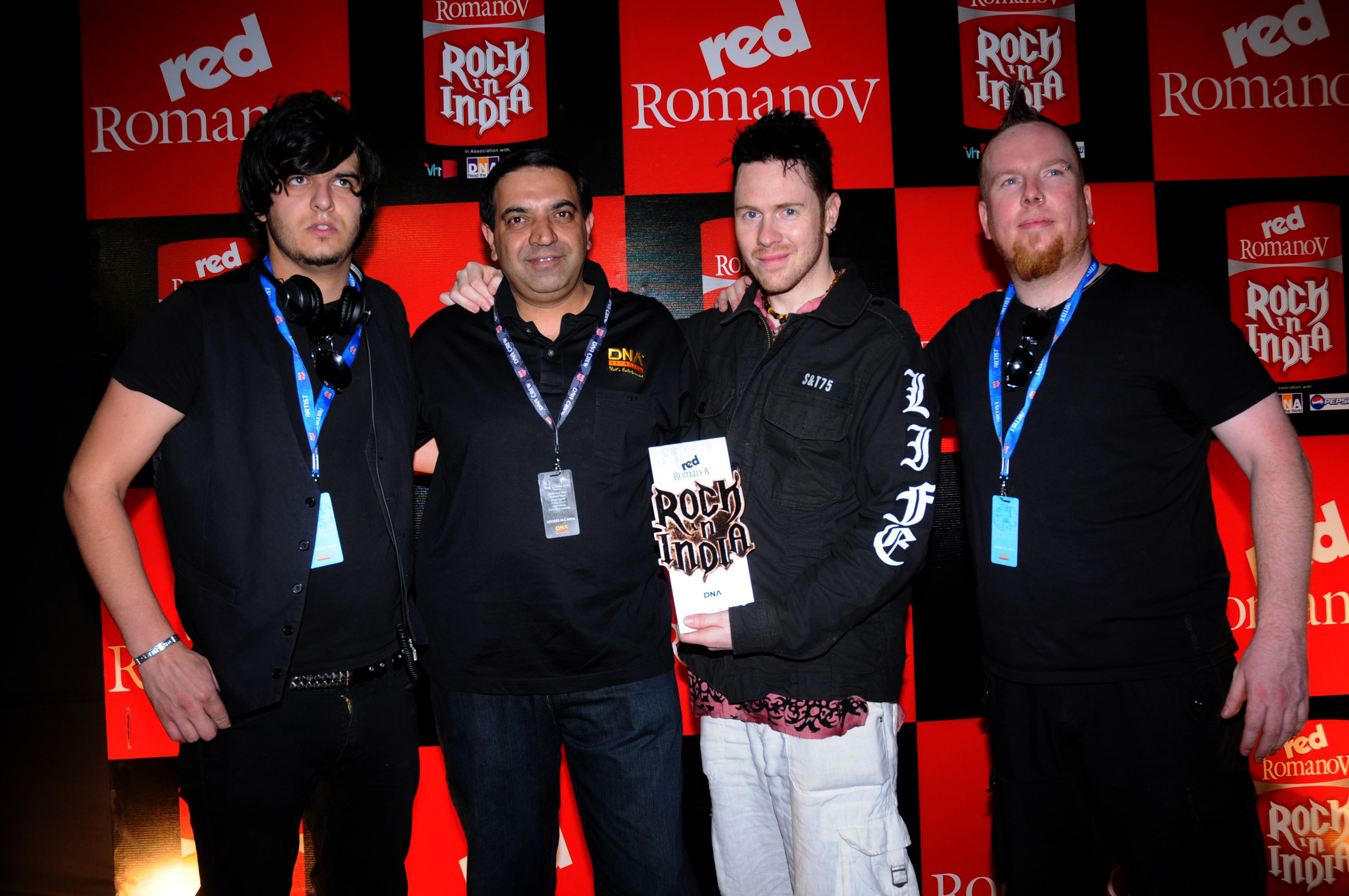
Jayce Lewis and band at Rock'n India 2010

== BBC 1 documentary ==
A BBC documentary covering Lewis's journey to fame was shown on BBC One Wales on 10 March 2010 as part of a series called Planet Wales. The 40-minute documentary, titled "Big in India" was the first of the series and included live performances in Dubai, India, and Germany. The documentary was repeated three months later on BBC One Wales and North. The documentary covered Lewis and EMI working towards the release of his second single and album. A DVD released was planned and a few promo copies produced, but never came to fruition.

=== Début album, 2010 ===
After writing and recording since early 2009, with a working title of "Chapter", Lewis released his first album as the self-titled Jayce Lewis, on 11 October 2010. Although he only released two singles in 2010, Lewis's album reached number 7 in the M-Music Asian charts, higher than those of Eminem and Bon Jovi, but was kept from the number 6 spot by Linkin Park. It's claimed; the wide diversity in the album attracted the broad interest in media and public.

The album was recorded in three separate studios, one of which is the famous Nott-in-Pill Studios in Newport, with ex-Skindred duo Jeff and Ginge. The album's release was promoted by a succession of videos and singles and accompanying videos: "Icon", "Solitaire", "Passes II", and "Electric Medicine". The videos were directed and edited by Lewis with chosen production teams. He noted the "Electric Medicine" video as his proudest achievement to date, both on and off the screen.

=== Hot 50 Sexiest men in Wales ===
In June 2010 the Welshman made the list in a public vote of Wales's top 50 sexiest men. Lewis was ranked at number 49.

== Collaborations ==
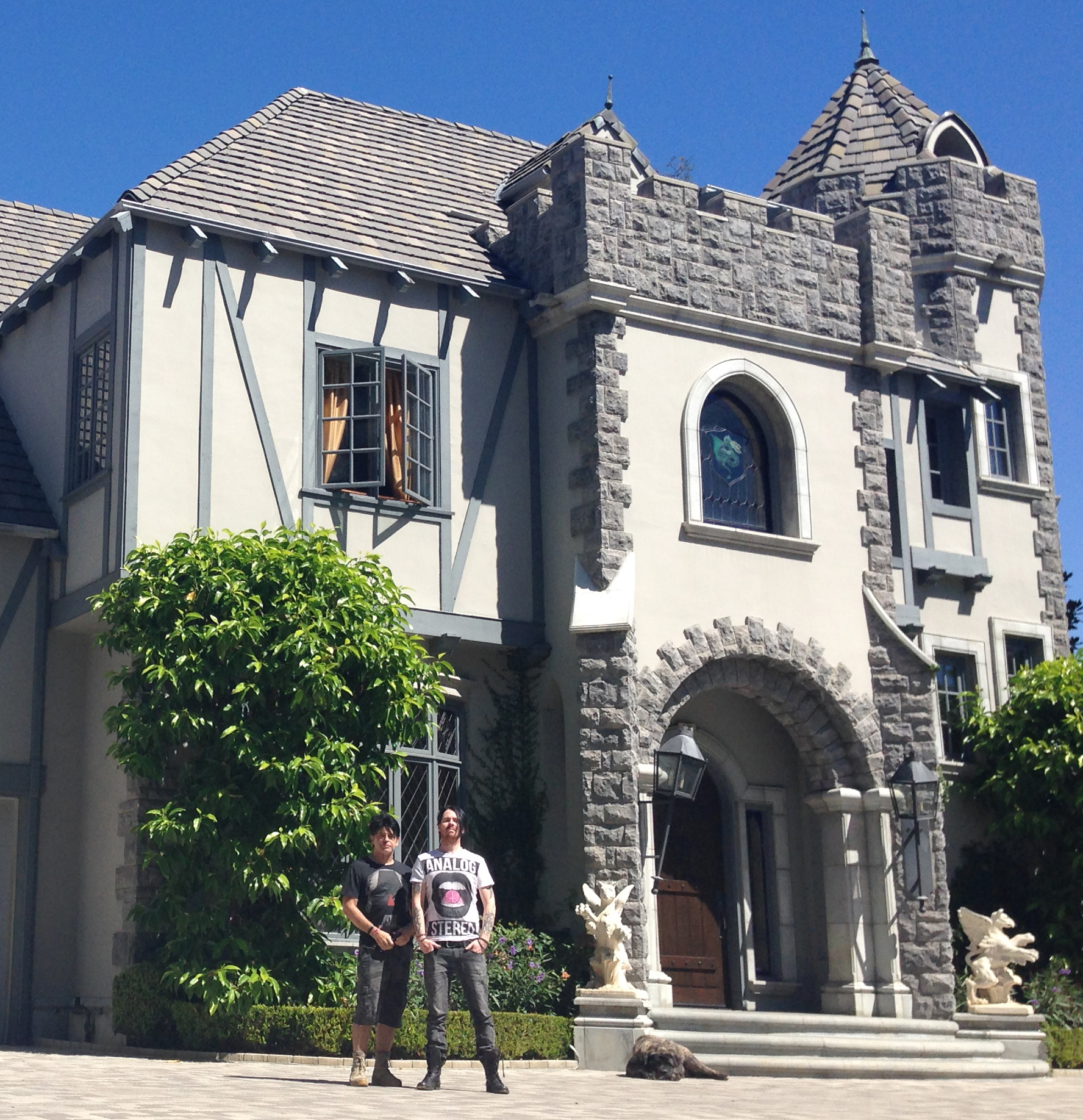
Gary Numan and Jayce Lewis in Los Angeles

In September and December 2011, Gary Numan confirmed Jayce as main support on his Dead Son Rising UK tour, covering 12 shows across the country. In an online interview, Numan hailed Lewis to being one of the best supporting acts to ever tour with him.

Numan documented the DSR tour in a published diary, praising Jayce further. Numan publicly invited Lewis to tour America together in 2012. Later, in 2014, both Numan collaborated with Lewis on "Redesign", which featured on Lewis's Nemesis album (under the project name Protafield).

Both Numan and Lewis toured once again later in 2017, confirming Lewis as main support for Gary Numan's UK and European leg of the Savage (Songs from a Broken World) tour promoting his 18th studio solo album. To date, Jayce Lewis is the only live act to have ever tour with Gary Numan twice.

=== Protafield Nemesis, 2014 ===
Appearing in an interview on Sky TV's The Moore Show, Lewis discussed working on second album, although not naming the title; he described as "a huge step forwards" from the first release. Early in 2014 Lewis announced his new project, Protafield, after agreeing a record contract with Caroline International (Universal Music Group) with his new album 'Nemesis'. It's reported that the Protafield name was created between Lewis and Fear Factory front man Burton C. Bell

==== Brian May & Roger Taylor (Queen) ====
The Nemesis album had guest-performer involvement, including Roger Taylor of Queen (providing the drum track for "Wrath"), Gary Numan (guest vocals on "Redesign"), and actor Lance Henriksen (best known for Aliens and two follow-on films, and the TV series Millennium).

=== Million (Part 1) 2017 ===
In 2017, Lewis released his third studio album, titled Million. Unlike previous releases, Million was released in a series of two parts, both with record label Universal. In total, the album consisted of seven tracks, and featured a collaboration from Queen guitarist Brian May.

=== Million (Part 2) 2018 ===
On 12 October 2018, Million (Part 2) was announced for release. The second series a double album release, featuring a further special guest collaboration with Atheist Professor Richard Dawkins, who recorded a spoken word contribution for the track 'Exhale'.

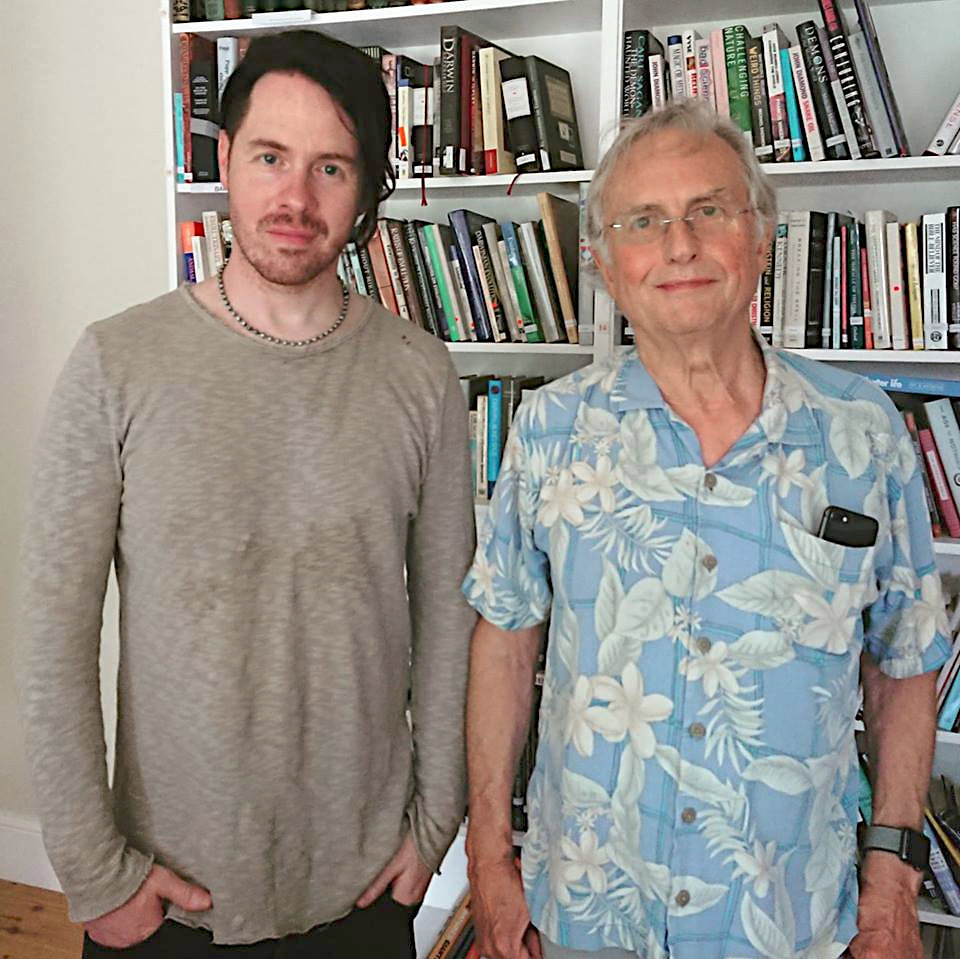
Lewis with Richard Dawkins in Dawkins' home while working on Million (Part 2)

Steve Strange (Visage)

Steve Strange's admiration for Jayce was commonly known following the "Big in India" BBC documentary. Strange, of the 1980s new romantic band Visage, promoted their collaboration with the release of a live recording of them performing the 1980s hit "Fade to Grey" together. Strange later recorded his final ever recordings with Lewis shortly before his death on 12 February 2015 at his studio in Bridgend, South Wales.

Lewis dealt with Strange's funeral arrangements and was a pallbearer, alongside other 1980s stars such as Boy George, Martin Kemp, Gary Kemp and Steve Norman. For a short time Lewis was also the live drummer in Visage on their 'Hearts and Knives' tour in 2013, the Welshman's been quoted in describing pallbearer duties for Strange as 'The most overwhelming experience of his life'.

== Darth Vader - David Prowse MBE ==
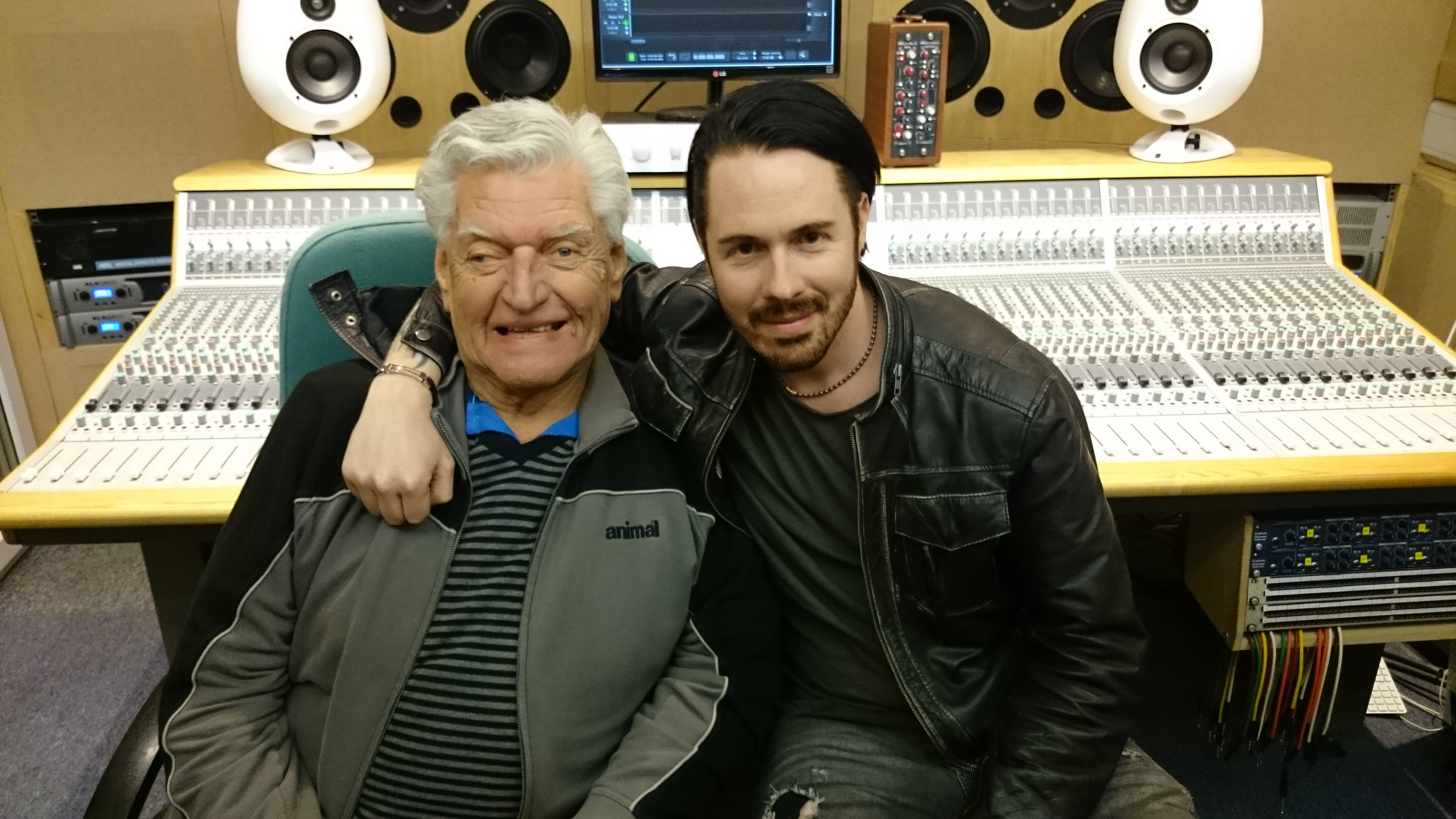
Dave Prowse and Jayce Lewis 2015

David Prowse & Jayce Lewis with Prowse's Darth Vader Mask - 2014

David Prowse was an active manager of Jayce from 2005 to 2010. In 2009, Prowse agreed to handle all PR for Lewis following a long term friendship since 2001.

On 1 October 2015, the two filmed a mini-documentary, The Force's Mouth, a short studio tutorial video demonstrating a recording process with Prowse and effecting his voice as the famous villain Darth Vader, a welcomed piece of film by the Star Wars community after 37 years of debate about the voice casting choices of the original production. Prowse and Lewis retained a close friendship and business partnership lasting over 19 years.

== Northstone Studios - Bridgend ==
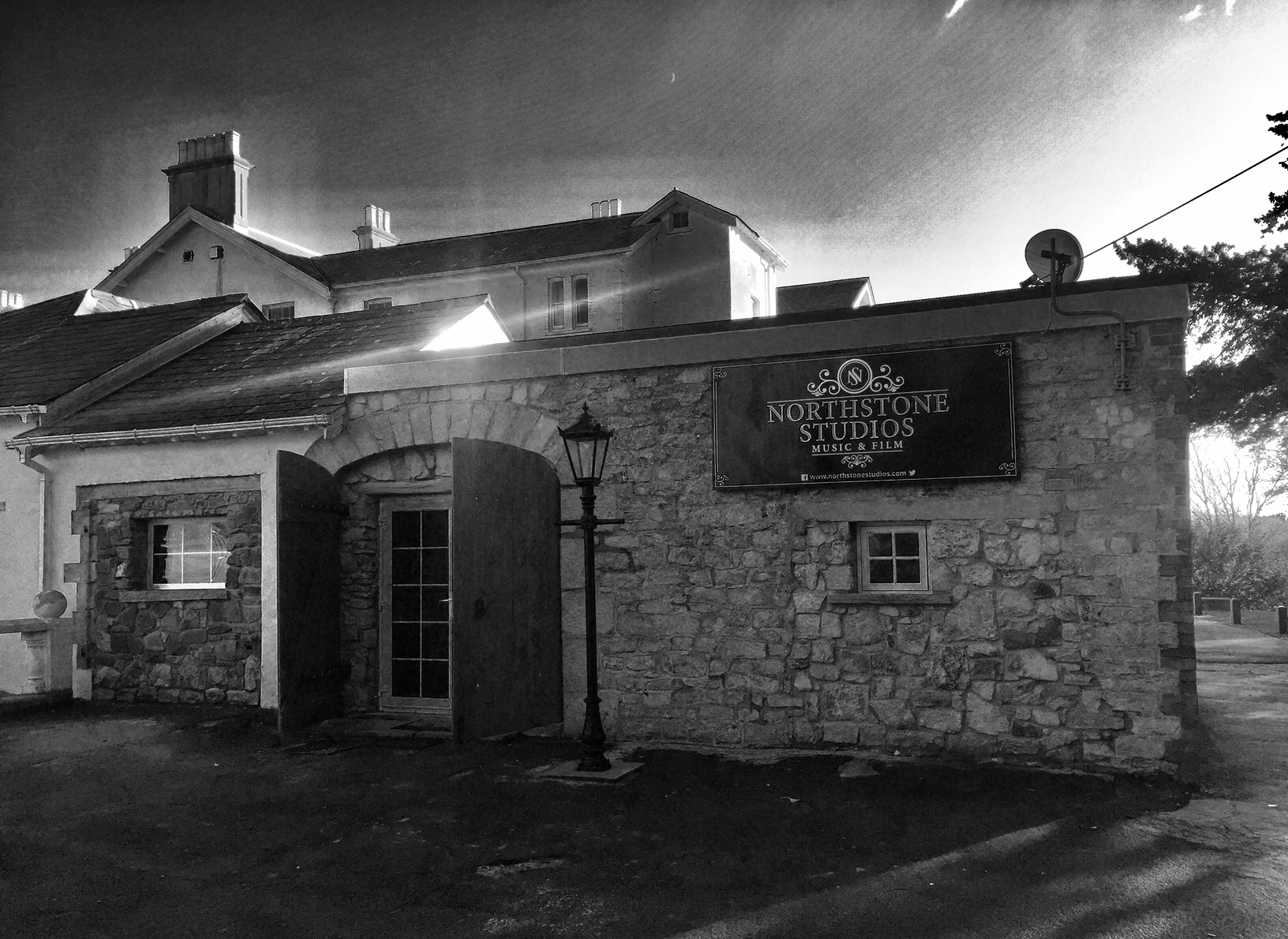
Northstone Studios, Bridgend. South Wales

In October 2016 Lewis announced the opening of his newly built recording studio, Northstone Studios. The studio was renovated from a disused outbuilding connected to the Court Colman Manor in Bridgend, South Wales. It took Lewis a total of nine months to build at a cost of £60,000 with an undisclosed investment from local government; Creative Industry Wales. In several interviews Lewis mentions the workings of his new album along with a collaboration with Queen guitarist; Brian May.

=== Ascension of The Watchers ===
In 2020 Lewis become a member of the American gothic rock band Ascension of The Watchers, formed by Fear Factory front man Burton C. Bell and Ministry band keyboardist John Bechdel. Lewis was initially involved as producer and mixer for their 2020 album Apocrypha, but his full-time role as drummer and programmer became clear during the album's creative process.

== Rammstein ==
2022 German Industrial act Rammstein released a remix composition collaboration with Jayce Lewis of the song 'Armee Der Tristen' following a conversation with the bands percussionist Christoph Schneider whom, Lewis has been a friend of for 12 years. In an interview with Rammwiki.net Jayce discussed approaching the drummer soon after hearing their new Rammstein album, titled 'Zeit' insisting on a remix composition as he had Immediate Ideas and Vision to compose a new edition. Till Lindemann vocal recordings are the only original feature recordings from the official song release.

== Motorcycle Museum Ownership ==
In October 2026 an announcement was reported by Yahoo News that Jayce had taken over the 'Reg Imray Collection' at The World of Country Life - Exmouth, purchasing the collection over some years due to its risk of being sold off.

Jayce Lewis in 1995 on Reg Imray's Indian Motorcycle

The musician's personal history with museum and both it's owners began in August 1995, where the musician encountered a chance meeting at a VJ Day celebration held at Cardiff Castle. From there Reg Imray and his friend - David Honnor (who where both deaf at birth) formed a friendship with Jayce, regularly corresponding via written letters sent to each other every month over the course of their 22 year friendship, in an interview with the Exmouth Journal; Jayce mentions keeping every letter sent by Reg, with a few of the letters expressing support to Jayce encouraging the welshman to open his own museum where Mr Imray would contribute some of his own motorcycles.

Reg Imray & Jayce Lewis in 1995

Reg Imray passed away in April 2017 at the age of 94, survived by his friend David Honnor, who took the responsibility forwards to care for the collection after inheriting the entire museum.

A surprise rebrand launch was organised for David Honnor by Jayce and Country Life renaming the Museum 'The Imray & Honnor' Museum, Including Mr Honnor's name in the collections title, honouring both Reg Imray and David Honnor together.

== Discography ==
Studio albums

Year	Project	Title	Label
2009	Jayce Lewis	Smash Hits 2009	Virgin Records
2010	Jayce Lewis	Jayce Lewis	EMI Records
2014	Protafield	Nemesis	Universal Music
2015	Documentary	The Force's Mouth	Devfire Entertainment
2017	Jayce Lewis	Nemesis (Special Edition)	Universal Music
2017	Jayce Lewis	Million (Part 1)	Universal Music
2018	Jayce Lewis	Million (Part 2)	Universal Music
2019	Acid Reign	The Age of Entitlement	Producer/Mixer
2020	Jayce Lewis	FL Studio JL Drum Pack	Image-Line
2020	Ascension of The Watchers	Apocrypha	Dissonance Productions
2021	Ascension of The Watchers	Translations	Cherry Red Records
2022	Rammstein	Armee Der Tristen Remix	Universal Music
2026	Acid Reign	Daze of the Week	Producer/Mixer
