= Black Science (GZR album) =

Studio album by GZR
- Released: July 1, 1997
- Recorded: Studio Morin Heights
- Genre: Alternative metal, industrial metal, groove metal
- Length: 55:06
- Label: TVT
- Producer: Geezer Butler and Paul Northfield

GZR chronology
Plastic Planet (1995)	Black Science (1997)	Ohmwork (2005)

Professional ratings
Review scores
Source	Rating
AllMusic	2.5/5 stars
Vox	(6/10)

Black Science is the second studio album by heavy metal band GZR (known at the time as Geezer). It was released on July 1, 1997 by TVT Records. The cover art for the album is intended to represent the Black Sabbath song "Hand of Doom".

Geezer about the Doctor Who connection in the song "Among the Cybermen":

"Yes, the lyrics were originally about the death of Doctor Who. The original chorus was "Doctor Who lies dead among the Cybermen", about the final battle of Dr. Who, but was supposed to be symbolic of the end of childhood. I changed it because I thought it sounded a bit silly. Most of the album is about growing up in the era of Sixties television, and its influence on me."

== Track listing ==
1. "Man in a Suitcase" – 4:09
2. "Box of Six" – 3:53
3. "Mysterons" – 5:36
4. "Justified" – 4:05
5. "Department S" – 4:45
6. "Area Code 51" – 4:48
7. "Has to Be" – 3:29
8. "Number 5" – 5:04
9. "Among the Cybermen" – 4:43
10. "Unspeakable Elvis" – 3:47
11. "Xodiak" – 3:34
12. "Northern Wisdom" – 3:46
13. "Trinity Road" – 3:26
14. "Beach Skeleton" – 3:28 (Japan pressing only; later released online for free on March 3, 2010)

== Credits ==
- Geezer Butler – bass guitar, keyboards
- Pedro Howse – guitar
- Clark Brown – vocals
- Deen Castronovo – drums
- Recorded at Studio Morin Heights
- Produced by Geezer Butler & Paul Northfield
- Assisted by Simon Pressey
- Mixed by Paul Northfield at Studio Morin Heights
- Assisted by Don Hachey
- All music and lyrics written by Butler/Howse/Brown
