= City of Fire (band) =

Canadian metal band

- Origin: Vancouver, Canada
- Genres: Alternative metal, groove metal
- Years active: 2008-2014
- Label: Stomp Music
- Members: Burton C. Bell; Byron Stroud; Ian White; Sho Murray; Bob Wagner
- Website: Official website

City of Fire is a Canadian metal band formed in 2008. Members include vocalist Burton C. Bell of Fear Factory, bassist Byron Stroud from Fear Factory, Strapping Young Lad and Zimmers Hole, and drummer Bob Wagner of Econoline Crush. So far, the band has released two studio albums.

== History ==
The band grew from the one-off reformation in 2008 of Caustic Thought, an early-1990s group featuring Stroud, guitarist Ian White, and drummer Bob Wagner (and, briefly, Devin Townsend, who replaced Jed Simon). As both Stroud's other main bands Fear Factory and Strapping Young Lad were disbanded or inactive at the time, thought was given to continuing with Caustic Thought and Sho Murray was added to the line-up as a second guitarist. White turned down the vocalist role so Stroud contacted Bell, who accepted.

In 2010, the band's self-titled debut album was released. The second pressing of the album contained additional bonus tracks, one of which was a cover of the T. Rex song "Children of the Revolution". Several poorly recorded sample portions of their songs were uploaded on the band's MySpace page throughout 2009, often accompanied with video (consisting mostly of studio footage).

In September 2010, City of Fire did its first international tour, supporting Soulfly on a tour of Australia and New Zealand, with Jed Simon (Strapping Young Lad, Zimmers Hole) filling in for White on guitar. Two days after that tour ended, Fear Factory played a week of shows as the major support to Metallica.

A video for the single "Rising" was uploaded by Stomp Entertainment in May 2010 but has since been taken down. Breaking from the music-video conventions to be expected of typically dark metal fare, "Rising" uses a bright color scheme with kaleidoscopic imagery.

In January 2012, City of Fire released a new single through Metal Hammer magazine titled "Bad Motivator". On February 25, 2012, the band provided an update on new their upcoming album Trial Through Fire. The album was eventually released on April 9, 2013.

== Discography ==
=== Studio albums ===
- City of Fire (2010)
- Trial Through Fire (2013)
