= City of Fire (album) =

Studio album by City of Fire
- Released: October 13, 2010
- Recorded: The Factory and Profile Sound, Vancouver, February–May 2009
- Genres: Heavy metal, alternative metal, progressive metal
- Length: 58:44
- Label: Candlelight Records
- Producers: City of Fire, Sho Murray

City of Fire chronology
City of Fire (2010)	Trial Through Fire (2013)

City of Fire is the eponymous debut album by Canadian metal band City of Fire.

== Background ==
The album features a cover of The Cult's "Rain" and T. Rex's "Children of the Revolution".

Vocalist Burton C. Bell said:

Byron always wanted to cover "Rain." I love that song, and I love that record, so I wanted to do a really decent version of it and make it our own. So we sat down and we came up with that. "Children of the Revolution" was just like—how did we come up with that? We were sitting there talking. Terry had worked on a couple of songs, and we though that sounded really cool, so we just said, "Hey! Lets do that one!"

== Track listing ==
No.	Title	Length
1.	"C∆rve Your Name"	4:35
2.	"Gr∆vity"	5:07
3.	"Rising"	3:19
4.	"A Memory"	3:51
5.	"Spirit Guide"	5:23
6.	"Coitus Interruptus"	4:45
7.	"H∆ny∆"	4:00
8.	"Emer∆ld"	1:58
9.	"Hollow L∆nd" (percussion by Sheldon Zaharko)	4:46
10.	"D∆rk Tides"	4:13
11.	"R∆in" (The Cult cover; percussion by Sheldon Zaharko; written by Billy Duffy and Ian Astbury)	5:34
12.	"L∆st Wish" (bonus track)	3:23
13.	"Children of the Revolution" (bonus track; T. Rex cover; written by [uncredited] Marc Bolan)	2:31
14.	"D∆rk Tides (Revisited)" (bonus track)	5:13
15.	"Rising" (video)	3:23

== Personnel ==
- Burton C. Bell – vocals
- Byron Stroud – bass
- Sho Murray – guitar
- Ian White – guitar
- Bob Wagner – drums
