= GZR =

American metal band

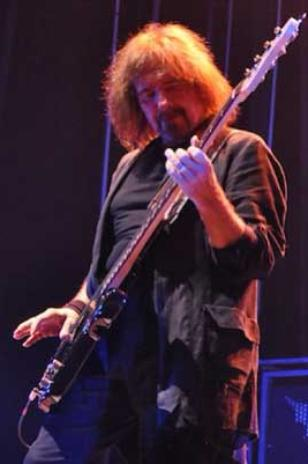
- Band founder Geezer Butler in 2013

Background information
- Also known as: g//z/r, geezer
- Origin: Houston, Texas, U.S.
- Genres: Alternative metal, industrial metal, groove metal
- Years active: 1995–2006
- Label: TVT
- Past members: Geezer Butler; Pedro Howse; Chad Smith; Clark Brown; Deen Castronovo; Burton C. Bell; Mario Frasca

GZR was an American groove metal band founded by and named after Black Sabbath bassist/lyricist Geezer Butler. The band has been marketed with three different names on different releases, g//z/r in 1995, geezer in 1997, and GZR in 2005. Most fans refer to the band as "geezer", although Butler himself refers to the band name as "gee-zed-ar". This incarnation of the band is not to be confused with Butler's previous attempt in 1985 to form a solo band, then known as the Geezer Butler Band – the two outfits are largely unrelated.

== History ==
The band's music is generally of a much harder edge than Butler is known for in Black Sabbath. This is not a surprise, as the vocalist on his first album (Plastic Planet) was Burton C. Bell from Fear Factory, who is known for more driving and harder edged vocals than ever was displayed in Black Sabbath. Before taking on Bell as vocalist for the debut album Plastic Planet, Butler contacted Devin Townsend to perform vocals. However, due to Townsend's recent stint with Steve Vai, where he had not been a lyricist, he was unwilling to enter into another band where he would have no lyrical input. Plastic Planet also featured Pedro Howse, Butler's nephew, on guitars, as well as Deen Castronovo (later of Journey) on drums. Bell did not stay with the band past the recording of Plastic Planet, due to Fear Factory commitments.

In 1996, the band re-emerged with an exclusive track for the Mortal Kombat: More Kombat compilation titled "Outworld", featuring Anger on Anger vocalist Mario Frasca. This proved to be a one-time collaboration as Frasca was replaced by Clark Brown from the band Symatic for GZR's second album, Black Science, released in 1997. The GZR formation played a few live dates in 1996 and 1997 behind the release of the album, however, this was not a full-fledged tour, as most of the gigs were played concurrent to the Ozzfest tour of that year, including some dates with Deen Castronovo. Three songs from a 1996 concert in Detroit are included as bonus tracks on the Japanese pressing of Plastic Planet. Live tracks are also included on Geezer Butler’s boxed set Manipulations of the Mind. The band opened for musicians like Bruce Dickinson who was playing some live gigs at the time. Castronovo was replaced on drums by Chad Smith (not to be confused with the Red Hot Chili Peppers drummer with the same name).

== Discography ==
- 1995: Plastic Planet
- 1997: Black Science
- 2005: Ohmwork
- 2021: The Very Best Of
- 2021: Manipulations of the Mind (The Complete Collection)

== Appears on ==
- Mortal Kombat: Motion Picture Soundtrack (1995) – performing "The Invisible"
- Mortal Kombat: More Kombat (1996) – performing "Outworld"
- Dog the Bounty Hunter, episode "This Dog Can Hunt" (S2.E13, 2005) - performing "I Believe"

== Band members ==
- Geezer Butler – bass, keyboards
- Pedro Howse – guitars
- Deen Castronovo – drums (1995–1997)
- Burton C. Bell – vocals (1995)
- Mario Frasca – vocals (1996) (credit only, "Outworld")
- J.C. Stokes – vocals (1996) (uncredited, "Outworld")
- Clark Brown – vocals (1997–2006)
- Chad Smith – drums (1997–2006)
- Lisa Rieffel – vocals (2005) (appearance only, "Pseudocide")
