= Geezer Butler =

English bassist (born 1949)

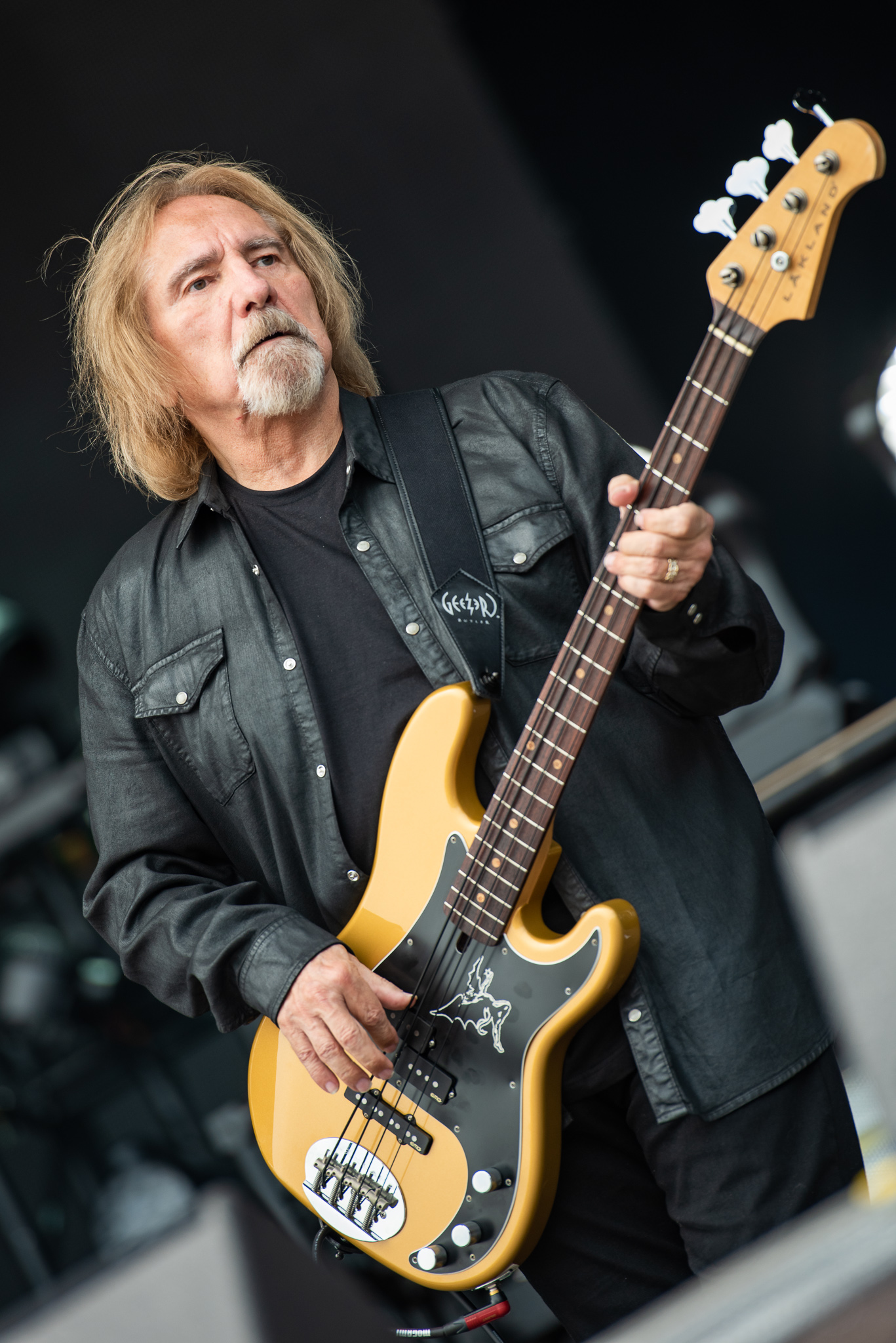
- Butler performing with Deadland Ritual in 2019

Background information
- Born: Terence Michael Joseph Butler; 17 July 1949 (age 77); Aston, Birmingham, England
- Genres: Heavy metal; blues rock; hard rock
- Occupations: Musician; songwriter
- Instrument: Bass guitar
- Years active: 1965–present
- Formerly of: Black Sabbath; Ozzy Osbourne; GZR; Geezer Butler Band; Heaven & Hell; Deadland Ritual
- Website: geezerbutler.com

Terence Michael Joseph "Geezer" Butler (born 17 July 1949) is an English musician, best known as the bassist and primary lyricist of the pioneering heavy metal band Black Sabbath. He has also recorded and performed with Heaven & Hell, GZR, Ozzy Osbourne, and Deadland Ritual.

== Early life ==
Butler adopted the nickname "Geezer" at an early age. "It came because when I was at school, my brother was in the army, and he was based with a lot of Cockneys. And people in London call everybody a 'geezer.' [It means] just a man — like, 'Hello, mate.' It's just like somebody calling you 'dude' over here (in the United States). In England, it'd be 'geezer.' So my brother used to come home from leave from the army, and he'd be going, 'Hello, geezer. How are you, geezer?' So because I had looked up to my brother when I was about seven years old, I'd go to school calling everybody a geezer. So that's how I got cursed with it."

Butler grew up in a working-class Irish Catholic family, the son of James and Mary Butler. He had six siblings. His father had served in the Royal Scots Regiment and later settled in Birmingham, where he worked for an engineering company. Mary had worked as a nanny in her younger years and became a housewife after marrying James in 1929. Both of his parents were born in Dublin. and were poor, typically having "no money whatsoever". He was born in the family house on Victoria Road in the Aston district of Birmingham, a house that had been damaged by Luftwaffe bombs during the Second World War. When he was just one day old, his sister Eileen tried to toss him out a bedroom window in a fit of jealousy.

Butler has said that he enjoyed an "incredibly loving, happy childhood". The family home had no telephone, hot water or bathroom, and considered itself lucky to have their own outside toilet. Two of Butler's older brothers had been called upon to serve in the army and Butler feared that he would be next. However, mandatory national service was ended in the United Kingdom a couple of years before he was due to be conscripted.

At the age of ten, Butler passed the eleven plus examination and was accepted by Birmingham's Holte Grammar Commercial School in 1960. Learning English literature such as Shakespeare furthered his love of reading, and he says "I never went a day without reading something." He credits this education, along with his vivid imagination, for the composition skills he would later use as Black Sabbath's lyricist. He was later heavily influenced by the writing of Aleister Crowley as a teenager.

By his late teens, he had stopped attending Mass. He cited a loss of belief, and feels that everyone should sooner or later decide for themselves what to believe in. Initially, Butler was "going to Mass every Sunday just to take a look at all the nice girls that were going there", he recalled years later. After growing his hair long as a teenager, he would encounter a nun every Sunday at Mass who found it humorous to refer to Butler as "miss", and he soon decided to never go back.

Butler became obsessed with The Beatles and The Kinks, and later Cream and Jimi Hendrix. When The Beatles appeared on a Birmingham television programme called Thank Your Lucky Stars in January 1963, Butler waited outside the studio to get a glimpse of them. It was here that he met another Beatles fan, John "Ozzy" Osbourne, for the first time.

== Career ==
=== Early bands and Earth ===
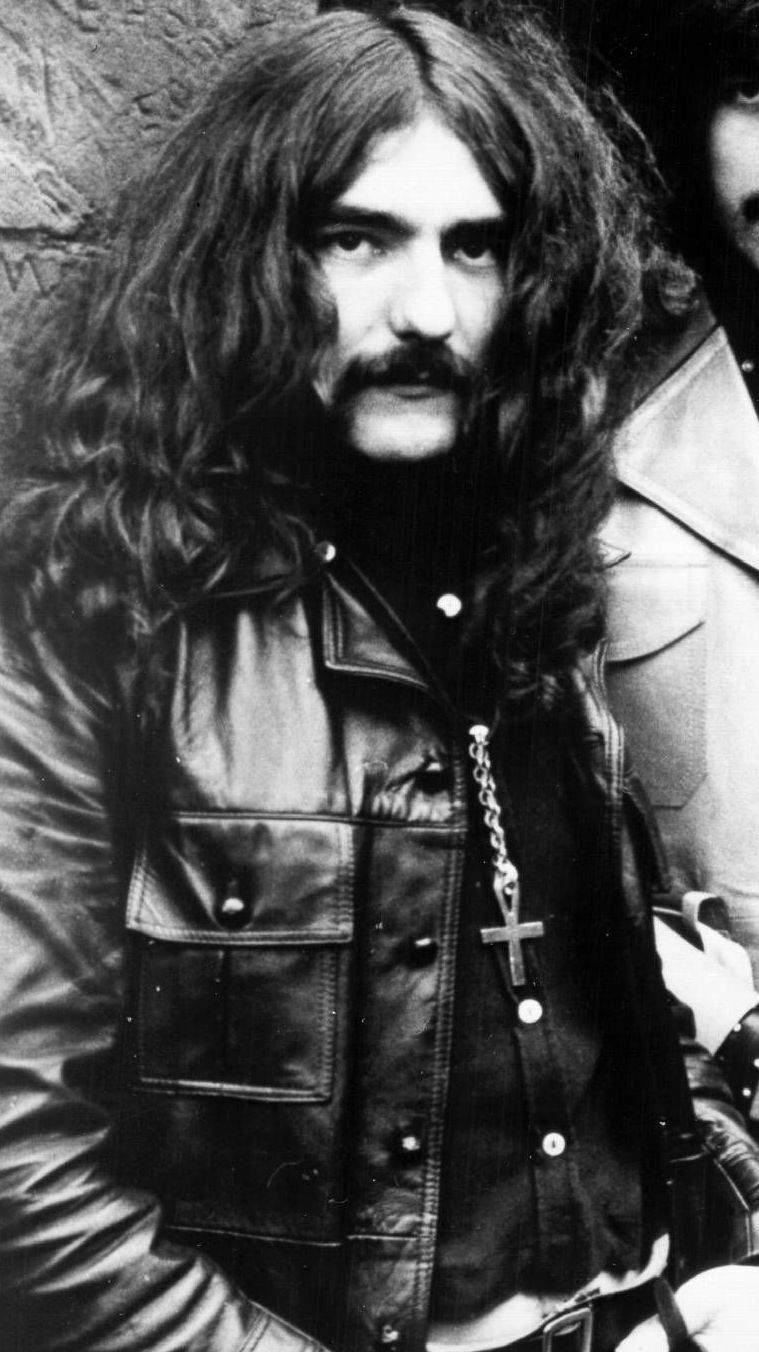
Butler in 1970

Butler joined his first band, the Ruums, named after an Arthur Porges science fiction story, in 1965. His first professional gig was with the Ruums at the Parochial Hall in Erdington, where they performed covers of various Merseybeat bands. The Ruums would perform only a handful of local gigs before breaking up, but it was long enough for Butler to decide that he wanted to devote his life to music.

In late 1967, Butler formed the band The Rare Breed, with Osbourne soon joining as lead vocalist. At that time, Butler was dating a girl named Georgina who lived near Tony Iommi, and Iommi's earliest memories of Butler involved seeing him walking past his house every day to visit her. Georgina would later become Butler's first wife. Later, Iommi and Butler became acquainted when their bands played at a nearby nightclub. Separated after The Rare Breed disbanded, Butler and Osbourne reunited to form the blues foursome Polka Tulk, along with guitarist Iommi and drummer Bill Ward, both of whom had recently left a local blues band called Mythology. Polka Tulk was soon rebranded as Earth, but a band already existed in the small-time English circuit with the same name, so they were forced to change the name again to avoid confusion. Inspired by the popular Boris Karloff horror film of the same name, Butler suggested the name Black Sabbath in early 1969.

=== Black Sabbath (1969-1984, 1987, 1990-1994, 1997-2006, 2011-2017, 2025) ===
Inspired by John Lennon, Butler played rhythm guitar in his pre-Sabbath days, including with The Rare Breed. When Sabbath was formed, Iommi made it clear that he did not want to play with another guitarist, so Butler moved to bass. According to Butler, "I'd never played bass until I was on stage at the first gig that we played. Borrowed the bass guitar off one of my friends and it only had three strings on it." Butler lists Jack Bruce of Cream as his biggest influence as a bassist. Iommi described Butler as being "from another planet" in the band's early days; he took LSD, wore Indian hippie dresses, and was very peaceful. At the time Black Sabbath was formed, Butler had been hired by a Birmingham steel company to train in the accounting department, and this business experience resulted in him managing the band's finances in the early days.

In the summer of 1977, drummer Bill Ward visited Butler at his Worcestershire home to inform him he had been fired from Black Sabbath after a band meeting, telling him that Iommi and Osbourne questioned his commitment. Butler said he was "pissed off" yet relieved, and spent the following two or three weeks resting and getting healthy, not giving much thought to what he would do next. He then received a phone call from Ward inviting him to rehearsals which were starting the next day. Upon returning to the band, Butler says Iommi and Osbourne both denied any involvement in his firing, with Ward claiming he had merely been the messenger. He says he was never offered an explanation. The event changed Butler's attitude towards Black Sabbath and he was never able to completely trust his bandmates again, saying "a little bit of me died back then". He has said that he did not really want to return but did so only because he had nothing else going on musically.

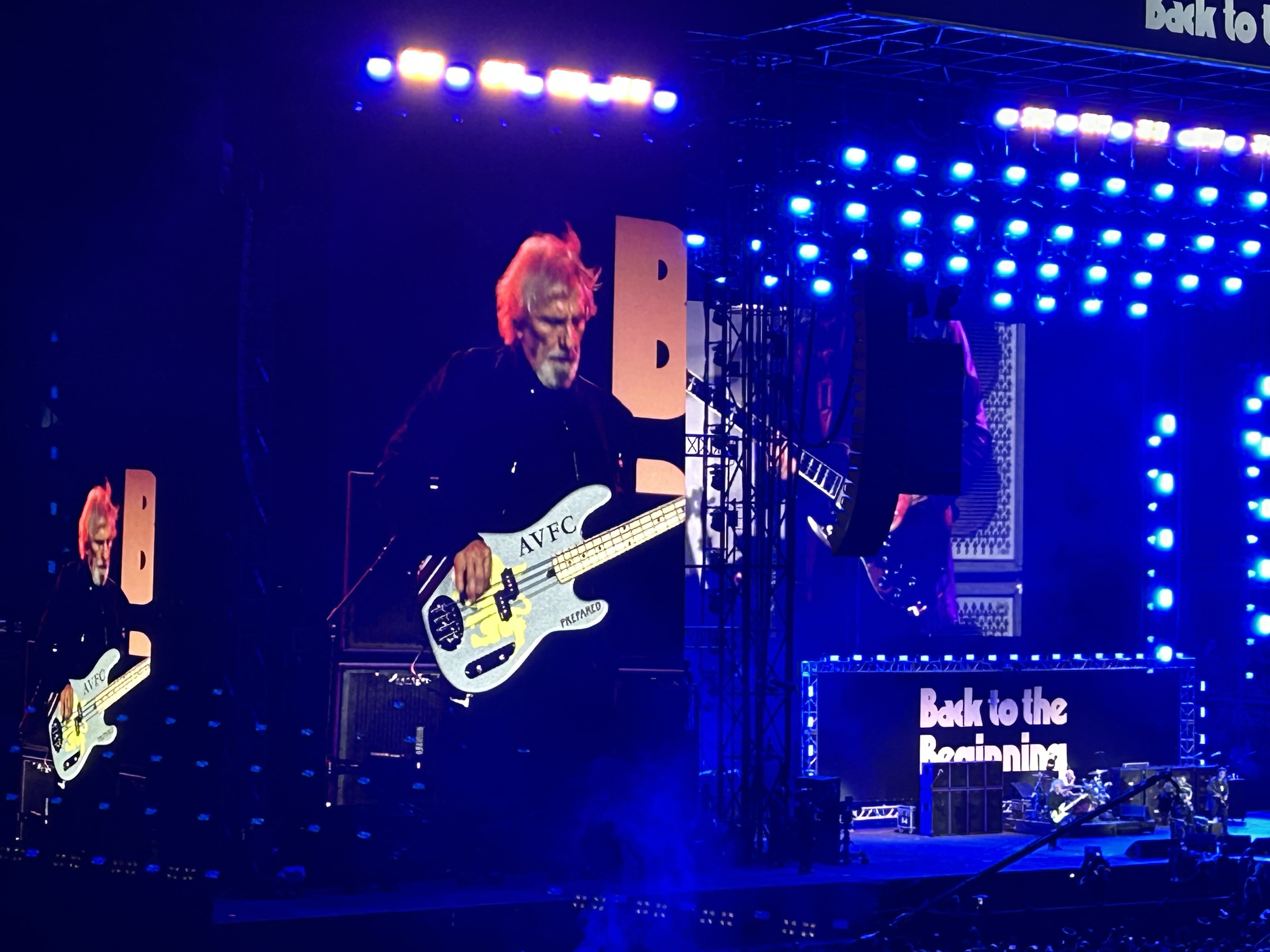
Butler with Black Sabbath at Back to the Beginning in 2025

After Black Sabbath fired Osbourne in 1979, Butler also briefly left the band to deal with the divorce from his first wife. The 1980 album Heaven and Hell was recorded with bassist Craig Gruber but Butler returned to the band at the last minute and re-recorded the bass parts prior to release. He again left the band in 1984 after touring in support of their 1983 album, Born Again, although he returned months later as the band attempted a comeback with vocalist David Donato.

He rejoined Black Sabbath in 1991 for the reunion of the Mob Rules line-up, but again quit the group after the Cross Purposes tour in 1994.

He rejoined Iommi and Osbourne to record 13 and toured in support of the album from 2012 to 2014. He and Black Sabbath later embarked on their final tour which began in January 2016, and concluded in February 2017.

Despite previously ruling out any further reunions, Butler reunited with the original lineup of Black Sabbath at Back to the Beginning in July 2025 for a final show.

=== Ozzy Osbourne (1988-1989, 1994-1996) ===
In 1988, Butler joined the backing band of his former Black Sabbath bandmate Ozzy Osbourne to take part in the No Rest for the Wicked World Tour.

In 1994, Butler again joined Osbourne's band to perform on the Ozzmosis album, released in 1995. He toured with Osbourne on the Retirement Sucks tour from 1995 through 1996.

=== GZR (1995–2006) ===
After recording Ozzmosis, he formed GZR, issuing Plastic Planet in 1995. His next solo album, Black Science, followed in 1997. Butler returned to Sabbath once more for the 1997 edition of Ozzfest, and remained with the band for the remainder of their career. In 2005 he released Ohmwork, his third solo album.

=== Heaven & Hell (2006–2010) ===
In October 2006 it was announced that Butler, along with Tony Iommi, would be reforming the Dehumanizer-era Black Sabbath line-up with Vinny Appice and Ronnie James Dio under the name Heaven & Hell to differentiate between the Osbourne fronted line-up of Black Sabbath that had been performing at Ozzfest in the previous years. Heaven & Hell released two live albums Live from Radio City Music Hall (2007), Neon Nights: 30 Years of Heaven & Hell (2010), and one studio album titled The Devil You Know (2009). The line-up broke up after the death of Dio in 2010.

=== Other projects ===
Geezer Butler left Black Sabbath as the band disintegrated following the 1983–1984 Born Again tour. He would rejoin and leave the band several times over the years, with The Geezer Butler Band being his first attempt at a recording project outside of Sabbath. Along with Butler, the band consisted of guitarist Pedro Howse, who would later also play in GZR with Butler. Welsh vocalist Carl Sentance (ex-Persian Risk) fronted the band. The band released no recordings, but performed some shows in the mid-1980's of which some bootleg recordings still exist.

Geezer Butler, along with Rob Halford and Bill Ward, recorded a cover of Black Sabbath's The Wizard as the supergroup Bullring Brummies for Nativity in Black: A Tribute to Black Sabbath released in 1994.

Butler briefly joined the supergroup band Deadland Ritual formed by former Guns N' Roses drummer Matt Sorum. The band released its debut single and music video Down in Flames in December 2018. After playing a handful of live shows in 2019, Geezer Butler said that he considered Deadland Ritual to be dead.

In 2023, Butler published his autobiography Into the Void: From Birth to Black Sabbath—And Beyond. He also provided the narrating voice for the audio-book version. Later, he made a brief appearance during Foo Fighters' performance in Birmingham in June 2024.

In January 2026, Butler confirmed that he was working on a new solo album. He revealed that he recorded several demos with AI guide vocals, but intended to bring in live vocalists for the final product.

== Style and legacy ==
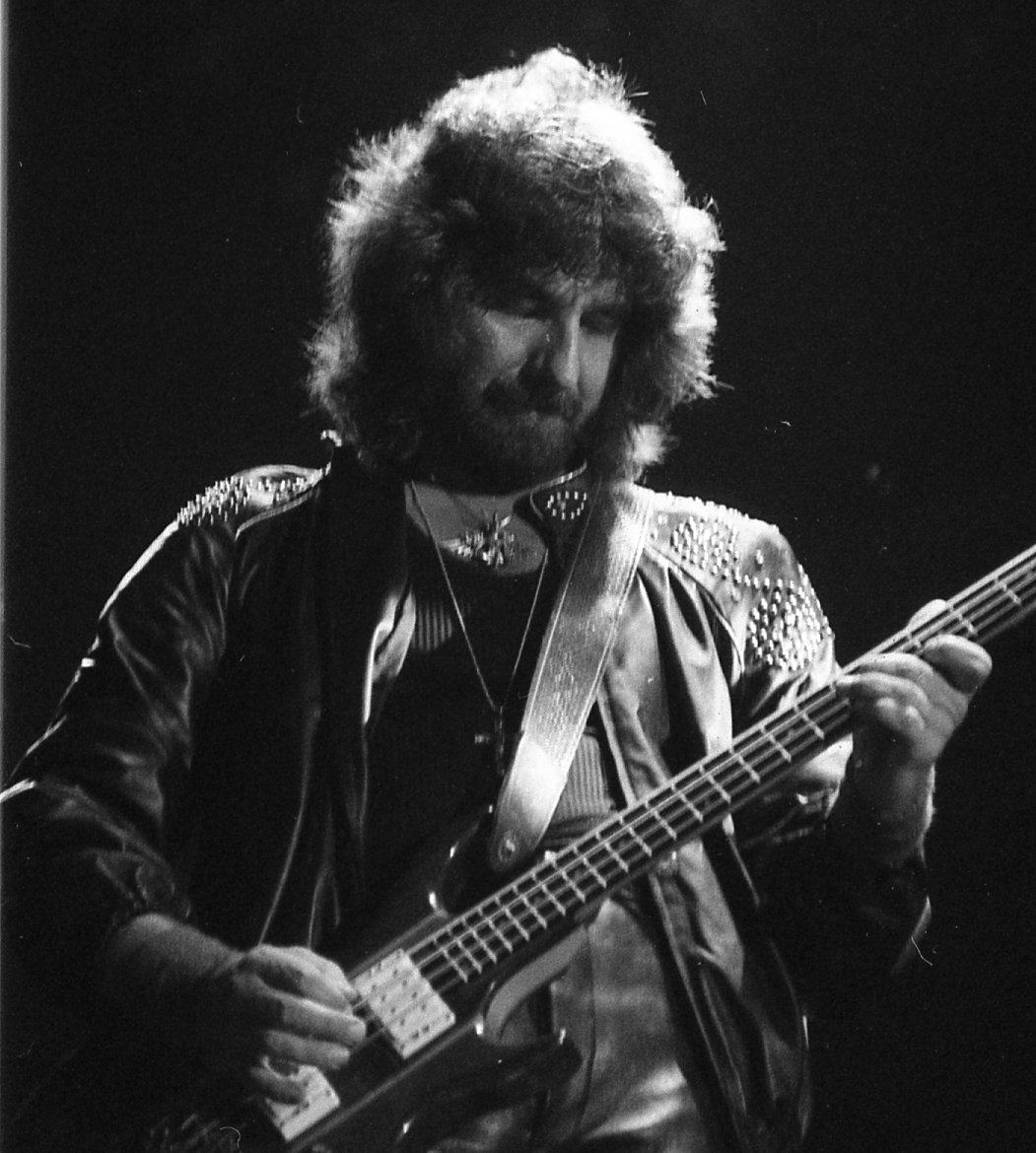
Butler with Black Sabbath in 1983.

Butler learned guitar as a teenager on an old acoustic that had only two strings. He could not afford the new strings needed to play chords, so he taught himself to play melody lines on the two strings. He says that due to this limitation he developed a "very strange style" which would later serve him well when he switched to bass guitar after forming Black Sabbath. Later, his older brother Jimmy gave him a brand new Rosetti acoustic guitar that cost him two weeks salary, an act of kindness that Butler says changed his life forever. With a proper instrument, Butler learned chords from the Bert Weedon book Play in a Day and saved enough money for a new Höfner Colorama electric guitar and Bird Golden Eagle amplifier. Soon after, he joined his first band.

Butler is noted for his melodic playing, and as being one of the first bassists to use a wah pedal and to down-tune his instrument (from the standard E-A-D-G to the lower C#-F#-B-E), as exemplified on Black Sabbath's Master of Reality album, to match Iommi who had started tuning his guitar to C# (a minor third down). During the band's Ozzy Osbourne era, Butler wrote most of the band's lyrics, drawing heavily upon his fascination with religion, science-fiction, fantasy and horror, and musings on the darker side of human nature that posed a constant threat of global annihilation.

In the earlier years of Black Sabbath, Butler would play fingerstyle over the neck of the bass, near the 14th fret, plucking very hard, producing his signature sharp and biting sound. Butler also resorted to using a pick at times when his fingers blistered from his aggressive playing style.

Butler is regarded as one of the most influential bassists in heavy metal. Billy Sheehan of Mr. Big said: "He's a founding father of a whole genre of music and a man who really set the bar early on to be such an integral part of the sound and song structure of Sabbath". In Mick Wall's biography of Iron Maiden entitled Run to the Hills, founder Steve Harris recalls: "I distinctly remember trying to play along to Black Sabbath's "Paranoid" – at first I just could not get it. I threw the guitar on my bed and walked out in a huff, but the next day I came back, picked it up and played it all the way through note-for-note! Once I got going, I started getting into bass-lines with a bit more subtlety to them."

Former Metallica bassist Jason Newsted, who defined Butler as his "number 1 influence," stated: "All true metal bassists look up to Geezer as a pioneer and Godfather of our chosen instrument. The best, ever." Rex Brown of Pantera and Kill Devil Hill asserted: "He's a legend. He's everything. Geezer is so much of an influence on me. Other bassists such as Type O Negative's Peter Steele, Minutemen's Mike Watt, Nightwish's Marko Hietala, and Metallica's Cliff Burton have also listed Butler as an influence.

In 2020, he was ranked 21st in Rolling Stone's list 50 Greatest Bassists of All Time.

One week before their farewell Back to the Beginning concert, Butler and the other original members of Black Sabbath were each made Freemen of the City of Birmingham.

== Personal life ==
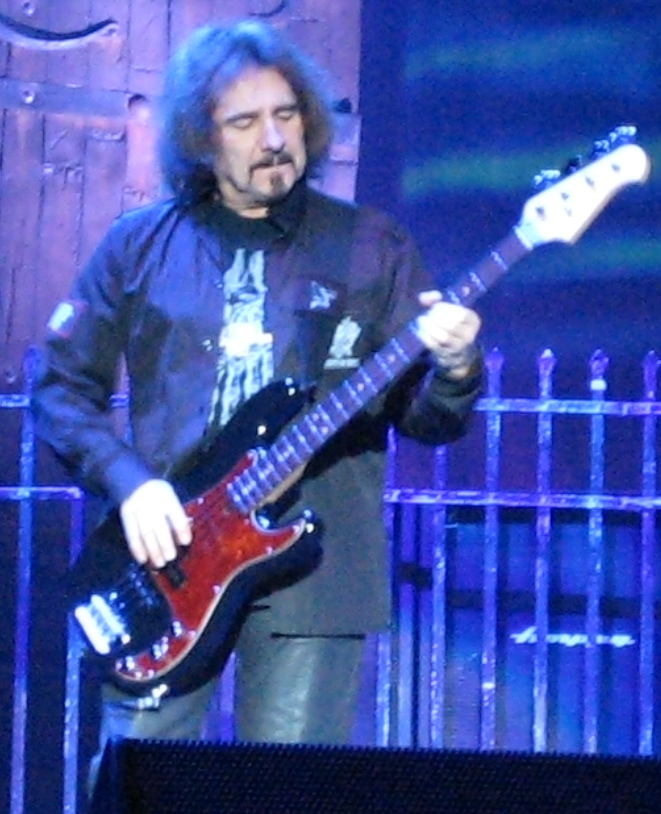
Butler performing with Heaven & Hell in 2007

Butler met his first wife Georgina at a school dance at Holte Grammar School in Birmingham as a teenager. The couple divorced in 1980. Butler had already met his second wife, Gloria, on 16 September 1978 just prior to Black Sabbath's concert at the Checkerdome in St. Louis, Missouri. Gloria later was manager for Heaven & Hell. The Butlers also share their Los Angeles home with several cats, of whom he has posted pictures on his website.

Butler's son James earned a degree in social sciences from Oxford University and resides in London. Butler describes him as "very politically minded". "My youngest is extremely left-wing, and I think it's because he was brought up knowing wealth and money, whereas I was brought up having no money whatsoever. That's where the church came in and made up for the lack of money because everybody knew each other in the street and everybody used to help each other out", Butler said.

Due to his love of animals, Butler became a strict vegetarian as a child and later became a vegan in the 1990s. He had a pet dog named Scamp in the 1950s who he "got to love more than any human friend" and the family house was "full of pets". Upon discovering where meat came from, he resolved to never eat it again. His mother was also a vegetarian. Butler appeared in a promotional ad for People for the Ethical Treatment of Animals in 2009 and later urged fans to boycott Fortnum & Mason until they remove foie gras from their shelves. Butler said, "I've seen some outrageous things in my time, but watching those poor birds suffer simply so that their diseased livers can be sold on your shop floor is horrific!"

Butler is a supporter of Aston Villa Football Club, and during Black Sabbath's induction to the Rock and Roll Hall of Fame, Butler is heard shouting "Up the Villa" as the members of the band left the stage. He has referred to AVFC as his "second religion" (after Catholicism) in his younger days and in 2023 he said that the team had become his "only religion", having become disillusioned with the Catholic Church. From the family house on Victoria Road in Aston, Butler could hear the roar of the crowd at nearby Villa Park, and he has said that hearing such cheering every week had a profound effect on him as a small child. He started attending games anytime he could and lists former Aston Villa star Peter McParland as his "all-time hero".

According to Black Sabbath bandmate Ozzy Osbourne, Butler "never uses foul language". A bin-man (refuse collector) had called him an "Irish cunt" when he was a small child, and he repeated the word at the family dinner table that evening, asking what it meant. His father told him that only ignorant people swear, and Butler was subsequently beaten with a belt. He says that to this day he seldom swears "despite spending thousands of days in the company of Ozzy Osbourne".

Over the years, Butler has become disillusioned with politics, saying "For me, it's almost pointless voting anymore because it seems to be the same no matter what party or politics you stand for. It all seems corrupted to me. It's all the same old people that rule the world." He has also expressed concern over the increasing level of control government has in people's lives. "Every time I go back to England, there are things that totally surprise me that you never think would happen in England, just all the CCTV everywhere. There seems to be so much control over people these days", he said in 2014. He has similarly become completely disillusioned with religion, calling it "inherited brainwashing".

In January 2015, Butler was briefly detained after a bar brawl in Death Valley, California and charged with misdemeanour assault, public intoxication and vandalism. He was released following detoxification and a citation. In 2016 he opened up about the event: "This guy started mouthing off about something. He was, like, some drunken Nazi bloke. He [...] started going on about Jews and everything – Jews this, Jews that. My missus is Jewish and I'd just had enough, and me hand sort of met his chin. I whacked him one."

In June 2023, he announced his retirement from performing, though he has since come out of retirement.

== Equipment ==
Butler endorses Lakland basses and has his own signature model, as well as DR Strings, EMG pick-ups, and Hartke amplifiers.

== Discography ==
Studio albums

- 1995: Plastic Planet (as "g//z/r")
- 1997: Black Science (as "geezer")
- 2005: Ohmwork (as "GZR")

=== Ozzy Osbourne ===
Studio albums

- 1995: Ozzmosis

EPs and live albums

- 1990: Just Say Ozzy
- 1993: Live & Loud ("Black Sabbath")

=== Heaven & Hell ===
Studio albums

- 2009: The Devil You Know

Live albums

- 2007: Live from Radio City Music Hall
- 2010: Neon Nights: 30 Years of Heaven & Hell

=== Black Sabbath ===
Studio albums

- 1970: Black Sabbath
- 1970: Paranoid
- 1971: Master of Reality
- 1972: Vol. 4
- 1973: Sabbath Bloody Sabbath
- 1975: Sabotage
- 1976: Technical Ecstasy
- 1978: Never Say Die!
- 1980: Heaven and Hell
- 1981: Mob Rules
- 1983: Born Again
- 1992: Dehumanizer
- 1994: Cross Purposes
- 2013: 13

EPs and live albums

- 1982: Live Evil
- 1995: Cross Purposes Live
- 1998: Reunion
- 2013: Live... Gathered in Their Masses
- 2016: The End
- 2017: The End: Live in Birmingham
