= Circles (Soul Coughing song) =

1998 single by Soul Coughing

Single by Soul Coughing

from the album El Oso
- Released: 29 September 1998
- Recorded: 1998
- Studio: The Sound Factory, Los Angeles
- Genre: Alternative rock
- Length: 3:07
- Label: Slash/Warner Bros.
- Songwriters: Mike Doughty; Mark Degli Antoni; Sebastian Steinberg; Yuval Gabay
- Producers: Tchad Blake, Soul Coughing

Music videos
- "Circles" (live action) on YouTube
- "Circles" (animated) on YouTube

“Circles” is a song by the American alternative rock band Soul Coughing, released in 1998 as the lead single from the group’s third studio album, El Oso. The song became one of the group’s most commercially successful releases, receiving substantial alternative-rock radio airplay and reaching the top ten of the U.S. Billboard Alternative Songs chart. Retrospective coverage has frequently identified it as one of the band’s best-known recordings.

== Background ==
Soul Coughing formed in New York City in the early 1990s and developed a sound blending alternative rock, jazz, sampling, and spoken‑word elements. By the time the band began work on El Oso in 1998, they had established a distinctive style built around looping basslines, eclectic sampling, and the vocal delivery of frontman Mike Doughty. “Circles” emerged during these sessions as one of the album’s more melodic and rhythm‑driven compositions.

== Composition ==
“Circles” is an alternative rock track incorporating elements of indietronica, trip‑hop, and alternative dance. The song is built around a repetitive rhythmic structure driven by bass and drums, with keyboard textures and minimal guitar accompaniment. Mike Doughty’s vocal delivery emphasizes cadence and repetition, particularly in the recurring refrain, “I don’t need to walk around in circles.” Music commentators have noted the track’s hypnotic groove as a central element of its appeal.

Interpretations of the song’s lyrics vary. Some commentators have suggested metaphorical readings related to cyclical behavior, emotional cycles, routine, and/or stagnation, though such interpretations are not directly attributed to statements by the band and remain speculative.

== Development and release ==
The track was recorded and mixed at The Sound Factory in Los Angeles, with production by Soul Coughing and Tchad Blake. The single was released by Slash Records in 1998 in several promotional formats, including 7‑inch and 12‑inch vinyl editions, paired with the tracks “Monster Man,” “These Are the Reasons,” and “Adolpha Zantziger.”

Two official music videos were produced. The first was live‑action featuring the band in a circular tube. The second version was an animation created by Hanna-Barbera, featuring its characters. It gave the song exposure through a promotional segment broadcast on Cartoon Network.

== Reception ==
“Circles” peaked at number eight on the U.S. Billboard Alternative Songs chart, making it Soul Coughing’s highest-charting single. It also appeared on other rock-format airplay charts during its release period. The track received heavy rotation on U.S. alternative, rock and college radio stations in 1998 and 1999.

In retrospective assessments, critics have frequently cited “Circles” as a highlight of El Oso and as a representative example of the band’s late-1990s sound. Reviews describe the song as melodic, repetitive, and stylistically consistent with Soul Coughing’s broader catalog. It remains one of the band’s most recognizable works. The song is commonly included in rankings of Soul Coughing’s most notable tracks.

== Charts ==
Chart (1998)	Peak position
US Billboard Hot 100	124
US Alternative Airplay (Billboard)	8

== Legacy ==
“Circles” is frequently cited as one of Soul Coughing’s defining songs and continues to appear in 1990s alternative rock retrospectives. The track was later included on the 2002 compilation Lust in Phaze: The Best of Soul Coughing.

The song was used in the 2004 remake of Walking Tall.

== See also ==
- El Oso
- Soul Coughing
- 1990s in music
- Alternative rock
