= The Gambler (EP) =

EP by Mike Doughty
- Released: July 2005
- Recorded: ???
- Genre: Rock
- Length: 20:42
- Label: ATO Records
- Producer: ???

Mike Doughty chronology
Haughty Melodic (2005)	The Gambler (2005)	Golden Delicious (2008)

The Gambler is an EP by the rock artist Mike Doughty. It was released in 2005 on ATO Records, exclusively through the iTunes Music Store. The album contains mostly live performances. Several of the tracks are cover songs ("The Gambler" – Kenny Rogers, "Strange Powers" – The Magnetic Fields, and "The King of Carrot Flowers" – Neutral Milk Hotel), and two of the compositions were originally performed with Doughty's previous band Soul Coughing. ("St. Louise Is Listening" and "Janine" can be found on the Soul Coughing albums El Oso and Ruby Vroom, respectively.) The EP also includes a video for the song "Looking at the World from the Bottom of a Well," a track found on Doughty's previously released album Haughty Melodic.

== Track listing ==
1. "The Gambler" (studio version) – Kenny Rogers cover
2. "Strange Powers" (live on XM Radio's “The Loft”) – The Magnetic Fields Cover
3. "St. Louise Is Listening" (live on KCRW)
4. "Busting Up a Starbucks" (live on KEXP)
5. "The King of Carrot Flowers, Pt. 1" (live on KEXP) – Neutral Milk Hotel Cover
6. "Janine" (live from the street in Seattle) – (Featuring. The Good People of Seattle)
- VIDEO: "Looking at the World from the Bottom of a Well"
