= Haughty Melodic =

2005 Mike Doughty Album

Studio album by Mike Doughty
- Released: May 3, 2005
- Recorded: 2002–2005
- Genre: Rock
- Length: 43:09
- Label: ATO Records
- Producer: Dan Wilson

Mike Doughty chronology
Skittish / Rockity Roll (2004)	Haughty Melodic (2005)	The Gambler (2005)

Professional ratings
Review scores
Source	Rating
Allmusic	4/5 stars
Robert Christgau	(2-star Honorable Mention)
Pitchfork	5.5/10
Rolling Stone	3/5 stars

Haughty Melodic is an album by Mike Doughty released on May 3, 2005. The album title is an anagram of the artist's fuller name; Michael Doughty. Doughty described the album as "a bunch of songs about yearning, redemption, happiness and hope." The album's sound is dense, with multi-tracked guitars, horns, keyboards, and Doughty's own voice multiplied over himself in harmony; a departure both from the sounds of Soul Coughing and Doughty's solo acoustic work.

== Production ==
It was gradually recorded over the course of two years at the home of producer Dan Wilson (of Semisonic). In contrast to his previous stripped-down releases, Doughty brought in many other musicians to record Haughty Melodic, including multi-instrumentalist Shahzad Ismaily, upright bass player John Munson, and N.E.R.D. drummer Eric Fawcett.

The album's arduous process began when Doughty flew out to Minneapolis to collaborate with Wilson on a bridge for his song "Busting Up a Starbucks." Wilson and Doughty had been set up by their mutual manager, Jim Grant. The two wrote the song "American Car" and made simple demos of guitar, piano and drum machine, which inspired Doughty so much that he tapped Wilson to produce a full album—despite the fact that he had no label and would have to weave recording sessions periodically in Wilson's busy schedule.

Doughty would fly out to Minnesota every few weeks for a session—a few days here, a couple of weeks there—and as the album gradually took shape it departed from those initial, sparse demos; in the time between sessions Doughty and Wilson would conceive new parts, new instrumentation, ideas for replacing one part for another. Doughty has remarked that he felt tortured by the stop-and-start process of constant re-examination, but in the end believed that the album achieved a kind of perfection through the time and scrutiny.

== Track listing ==
1. "Looking at the World from the Bottom of a Well" – 3:59
2. "Unsingable Name" – 4:17
3. "Madeline and Nine" – 3:03
4. "Busting Up a Starbucks" – 4:19
5. "White Lexus" – 2:20
6. "American Car" – 4:42
7. "Tremendous Brunettes" (ft. Dave Matthews on vocals) – 2:45
8. "I Hear the Bells" – 4:19
9. "Sunken-Eyed Girl" – 3:23
10. "Grey Ghost" – 3:15
  - Playing the CD on a computer that uses the Gracenote CDDB to identify track names displays the title as "Grey Ghost (Here's the hidden message. Eat your greens. Read "Everything and Nothing" by Borges. Thanks for listening. Mike)"
11. "His Truth Is Marching On" – 3:36
12. "Your Misfortune" – 3:06

== Early bootleg ==
Before the album's official release, an early "bootleg" was leaked onto the internet with a different track list and early unfinished versions of the songs, most notably: a version of "Tremendous Brunettes", which did not include vocals from Dave Matthews, as well as the song "I'm Still Drinking in My Dreams", which was excluded from the album when it was released. Like the original leak of The Skittish Sessions, these versions of the songs are extremely hard to find. In 2012, "I'm Still Drinking in My Dreams" was released officially as a part of Doughty's limited-time subscription service, The Lo-Fi Lodge, with a mastered version appearing on the re-release of Haughty Melodic. However, that recording varies from this early bootleg version, specifically this version includes a baritone solo after the bridge, and the released version's solo is a keyboard imitating a slide guitar.

1. "Unsingable Name"
2. "Madeline and Nine"
3. "Looking at the World From the Bottom of a Well"
4. "I'm Still Drinking in My Dreams"
5. "American Car"
6. "I Hear The Bells"
7. "Tremendous Brunettes"
8. "Grey Ghost"
9. "Sunkeneyed Girl"
10. "Busting Up a Starbucks"
11. "White Lexus"
