= Skittish =

Studio album by Mike Doughty
- Released: 2000
- Recorded: July 5, 1996
- Genre: Rock
- Length: 32:17
- Label: (self-released)
- Producer: Kramer

Mike Doughty chronology
| Skittish (2000) | Smofe + Smang: Live in Minneapolis (2002) |

Skittish is an album released in 2000 by Mike Doughty, founder of the alternative rock band Soul Coughing, and is his first solo effort. It was recorded in a single day, on July 5, 1996, with indie rock producer Kramer and mixed the following day. A number of the songs on the album had been intended as Soul Coughing songs, but were rejected by other band members for the album Irresistible Bliss. The CD was first released with a limited run of 200, which was signed by the artist and contained a written “Fake Word” on the track list. This limited CD was an online purchase directly from Mike Doughty.

Though Kramer developed some of the songs in Doughty's absence, with strings and organ, the disc is mostly a stark affair. Doughty's riffs—often using a guitar rhythm Doughty calls the "gangadank"—punctuate emotional lyrics on songs such as "The Only Answer" and "The Pink Life". However, Soul Coughing's label Warner Bros. chose to reject the songs, due to the fact that they sounded radically different to those created by Soul Coughing.

The album was not officially released, but different versions of the tracks, which sometimes included extra instruments as experimental mixes, were made available on Napster as The Skittish Sessions. Following Doughty's departure from Soul Coughing in 2000, he began touring solo and was surprised to discover that audiences were already familiar with the songs. As a result, he decided to produce white label versions of the CD himself and sell them at gigs, managing to sell 20,000 copies, mostly by hand at the front of the stage after shows.

Skittish finally got an official release in 2004 as part of the double album Skittish / Rockity Roll, which also includes Doughty's electro EP Rockity Roll.

== Track listing ==
All songs written and performed by Mike Doughty unless otherwise noted.

1. "The Only Answer" – 2:09
2. "The Pink Life" – 2:59
3. "Real Love"/"It's Only Life" (medley; Mary J. Blige/The Feelies covers) – 3:11
4. "No Peace Los Angeles" – 3:32
5. "Where Have You Gone?" – 3:12
6. "Thank You, Lord, For Sending Me the F Train" – 2:43
7. "Looks" (Student Teachers cover) – 2:57
8. "Shunned + Falsified" – 2:42
9. "All the Dirt" – 2:34
10. "Sweet Lord in Heaven" – 1:44
11. "Language Barrier" – 2:13
12. "Rising Sign" – 2:20

== The Skittish Sessions ==
All songs are different from the versions on the released Skittish.

1. "The Pink Life"
2. "Real Love/It's Only Life" (medley; Mary J. Blige/ The Feelies)
3. "No Peace Los Angeles"
4. "Mean Curl" *
5. "Where Have You Gone?"
6. "All the Dirt"
7. "Unluckier (I Yearn)" *
8. "World of Suck" *
9. "Shunned & Falsified"
10. "Skittish" *
11. "Thank You, Lord, For Sending Me The F Train"
12. "Mr. Bitterness" *
13. "Laundrytown *
14. "Looks" (Student Teachers cover)
15. "Rising Sign"
16. "Misery Bloom (I Failed to Use It)" *
17. "Cobain's Sarcoma (Sweet Lord in Heaven)"
18. "Language Barrier"

tracks with * indicate that they are unreleased tracks that were not featured on Skittish. However, "Laundrytown" and "I Failed to Use It" were later remastered and released on Skittish / Rockity Roll.
