= Soft Location =

American rock band

- Origin: Detroit, Michigan, United States
- Genres: Indie rock, Dream pop
- Years active: 2002–present
- Labels: Senseless Empire; Physical Things
- Members: Kathy Leisen; Matt Kantor; Ben Good; Chris Morris

Soft Location are a rock band from Detroit, Michigan with roots in New York City. They are led by Kathy Leisen.

== Biography ==
Soft location started in 2002 when Kathy Leisen was given a guitar by her old high school friend Matt Kantor. The two formed a musical duo. Leisen met drummer Chris Morris and synth player Ben Good after returning to her hometown of Detroit and started working with them. After she persuaded Kantor to return as well the band began recording as a quartet.

Soft Location released their debut album, Diamonds and Gems, on Senseless Empire in 2007. Follow-up Fools was released on Physical Things in 2013. They self-released their third album, Land Electric, in 2017. In addition, they collaborated in 2009 with the Brooklyn band Tall Firs to records the album Tall Firs Meet Soft Location, collectively under the name Glass Rock.

Warren Defever, founder of the band His Name Is Alive, has publicly praised the band. Mike Doughty, formerly of Soul Coughing, covered their song "Let the Moon Get Into It" for his 2009 solo album Sad Man Happy Man.

== Discography ==
=== Albums ===
- Diamonds and Gems (2007)
- Fools (2013)
- Land Electric (2017)

== Members ==
- Kathy Leisen – vocals, guitar, keyboards
- Matt Kantor – bass
- Ben Good – synthesizer
- Chris Morris – drums, Percussion
