= Water and Washington =

Studio album by Mike Doughty
- Released: September 18, 2013
- Genre: Indie rock
- Label: self-released

Mike Doughty chronology
Circles, Super Bon Bon, and the Very Best of Soul Coughing (2013)	Water and Washington (2013)	Stellar Motel (2014)

Water and Washington is a 2013 album by Mike Doughty. It is a rare bonus album available to participants in his PledgeMusic campaign for Circles, Super Bon Bon, and The Very Best of Soul Coughing. The album, available as a download to pledgers who ordered a copy, consisted of 20 acoustic tracks, including acoustic versions of the Soul Coughing songs on the album, as well as several tracks that were not included on the album.

== Track listing ==
No.	Title	Length
1.	"Lazybones [Acoustic Version]"	3:45
2.	"Is Chicago, Is Not Chicago [Acoustic Version]"	3:46
3.	"Super Bon Bon [Acoustic Version]"	3:11
4.	"Maybe I'll Come Down [Acoustic Version]"	4:25
5.	"The Idiot Kings [Acoustic Version]"	3:31
6.	"Unmarked Helicopters [Acoustic Version]"	3:28
7.	"Fully Retractable [Acoustic Version]"	2:45
8.	"Soft Serve [Acoustic Version]"	3:14
9.	"Sleepless [Acoustic Version]"	3:00
10.	"Circles [Acoustic Version]"	3:18
11.	"St. Louise Is Listening [Acoustic Version]"	4:10
12.	"Sugar Free Jazz [Acoustic Version]"	2:42
13.	"Soundtrack to Mary [Acoustic Version]"	3:06
14.	"True Dreams of Wichita [Acoustic Version]"	4:19
15.	"Mr. Bitterness [Acoustic Version]"	4:30
16.	"So Far I Have Not Found The Science [Acoustic Version]"	2:55
17.	"16 Horses [Acoustic Version]"	3:51
18.	"Janine [Acoustic Version]"	2:05
19.	"Moon Sammy [Acoustic Version]"	3:56
20.	"$300 [Acoustic Version]"	2:05
