= The Book of Drugs =

2012 memoir by Mike Doughty

- Author: Mike Doughty
- Language: English
- Subject: Addiction, Music, Soul Coughing, Autobiography
- Publisher: Da Capo Press
- Publication date: January 10, 2012
- Publication place: United States
- Media type: Trade Paperback, Kindle
- Pages: 256 pages
- ISBN: 978-0306818776
- Preceded by: Slanky

The Book of Drugs is a 2012 memoir by the musician and songwriter Mike Doughty. The book details Doughty's struggles with drug addiction, his musical career, both before and during his time with the band Soul Coughing and during his solo career.

The book was noted for its acerbic take on Doughty's Soul Coughing bandmates, as well as its unflinching look at the damage caused by addiction.

The book covers Doughty's experiences growing up in a military family, his education, first experiences with drugs such as alcohol, his friendship with Jeff Buckley, and his antagonism with his (unnamed) fellow Soul Coughing band members. It also covers his experience with 12-step programs, his travels to Ethiopia and Cambodia, his experience with bipolar disorder, and his post-Soul Coughing solo career.

The book received a generally positive reception for its unflinching narrative and engaging writing. The Village Voice review called it a "quickly paced, finely observed, and often mordantly funny read"—though some reviewers wondered, as Jay Trachtenberg of the Austin Chronicle did, why "...if the atmosphere was so rancid, Doughty stuck around."
