= Irresistible Bliss =

Studio album by Soul Coughing
- Released: July 9, 1996
- Recorded: 1995
- Studio: Power Station, New York City
- Genre: Alternative rock; alternative hip hop; noise rock; experimental rock
- Length: 45:19
- Label: Slash/Warner Bros. Records; 46175
- Producer: David Kahne, Soul Coughing, Steve Fisk

Soul Coughing chronology
Ruby Vroom (1994)	Irresistible Bliss (1996)	El Oso (1998)

Singles from Irresistible Bliss
- 1. "Soundtrack to Mary" Released: 1996; 2. "Super Bon Bon" Released: 1996; 3. "Soft Serve" Released: 1997

Professional ratings
Review scores
Source	Rating
AllMusic	3/5 stars
Christgau's Consumer Guide	(3-star Honorable Mention)
Entertainment Weekly	B+
The Guardian	5/5 stars
Los Angeles Times	3/4 stars
NME	7/10
Spin	7/10

Irresistible Bliss is the second studio album by the American electronic music group Soul Coughing, released in 1996. The band initially planned for Tchad Blake, producer of their first album Ruby Vroom, to produce the album, but the death of a family member in a car accident caused Blake to take a hiatus. Over the objections of his bandmates and his record label, Slash Records/Warner Bros., frontman Mike Doughty (then billed as "M. Doughty") hired producer David Kahne (Fishbone, The Bangles, Sublime, Tony Bennett, Sugar Ray, The Strokes); he was intent on following up the wild sonics of Ruby Vroom with a tightly wound, trembly, New Wave–inspired record.

The tracking, at Manhattan's Power Station recording studio, was complete in eleven days, and Doughty was jubilant at the results. Doughty tapped Steve Fisk to produce the tune "Unmarked Helicopters" for The X-Files soundtrack Songs in the Key of X.

All of Irresistible Bliss's songs were produced by Kahne, except tracks 2 and 6 (by Fisk) and track 12 by the band themselves. The mixing process split the tracks between three mixers: Kahne, Chris Shaw, and Ruby producer Tchad Blake, who intervened when bass player Sebastian Steinberg briefly quit the band.

Irresistible Bliss yielded a hit single for Soul Coughing, "Super Bon Bon." "Soft Serve" and "Soundtrack to Mary" also received some selective radio airplay.

== Track listing ==
All songs by Doughty/Soul Coughing.

1. "Super Bon Bon" – 3:31
2. "Soft Serve" – 3:12
3. "White Girl" – 2:37
4. "Soundtrack to Mary" – 3:06
5. "Lazybones" – 4:48
6. "4 Out of 5" – 3:12
7. "Paint" – 2:55
8. "Disseminated" – 2:41
9. "Collapse" – 3:06
10. "Sleepless" – 4:50
11. "The Idiot Kings" – 3:57
12. "How Many Cans?" – 4:24
13. "Lemon Lime" (Japanese release bonus track)
14. "Blow My Only" (Japanese release bonus track)

Additional CD with Japanese release

1. "Super Bon Bon" (Propellerheads Mezzanine Remix)
2. "Mr. Bitterness" (live)
3. "White Girl" (live)
4. "Lazybones" (live)
5. "Super Bon Bon" (Kick Dub Mix)

== Personnel ==
- Mike Doughty (billed as "M. Doughty") – vocals, guitar
- Sebastian Steinberg – bull fiddle, backing vocals
- Mark de Gli Antoni – keyboards, programming
- Yuval Gabay – drums, programming

== Appearances in other media ==
- "Super Bon Bon" was used as an entrance theme song by professional wrestling tag team Danny Doring and Roadkill in Extreme Championship Wrestling from 1998 to 2001. It appeared in the racing video game Gran Turismo 2 in 1999. It was used in a car theft scene in the fifth-season finale of Homicide: Life on the Street. It is briefly featured in The Sopranos episode "Long Term Parking". It was played in season 4 episode 8 of ABC's Castle, and season 6 episode 2 of NBC's The Blacklist. It was also featured on ESPN & Netflix' 2020 docuseries The Last Dance. In 2024 the song was used in Season 2, Episode 7 of Reacher.
- "Disseminated" was used in a late summer 2006 ad campaign for the Ford Transit. The song notably opens with the unflattering lines "The goat chewed up, once a tin can / The goat shat out, was a Ford sedan" although these lines were not used in the commercial itself.
