= Marie and Bruce =

- Theatrical release poster
- Directed by: Tom Cairns
- Screenplay by: Wallace Shawn; Tom Cairns
- Produced by: George Van Buskirk; Joseph Zolfo
- Starring: Julianne Moore; Matthew Broderick
- Cinematography: Patrick Cody
- Edited by: Andy Keir
- Music by: Mark Degli Antoni
- Production company: Holedigger
- Distributed by: New Films
- Release date: January 19, 2004 (Sundance)
- Running time: 90 minutes
- Country: United States
- Language: English

Marie and Bruce is a 2004 American comedy drama film directed by Tom Cairns, and starring Julianne Moore and Matthew Broderick. The story spans one day of a couple's dysfunctional, strained relationship.

It was based on the 1978 play of the same name by Wallace Shawn, who also wrote the screenplay with Cairns, and premiered at the Sundance Film Festival on January 19, 2004. Although the film was well received and starred major motion picture stars, it failed to receive distribution.

It remained obscure until it was released on DVD in March 2009. The music was composed by Mark Degli Antoni, of the band Soul Coughing.

== Plot ==
The story opens on a typewriter as it slowly flies out of a multi-storied apartment building window, shatters on the sidewalk and is collected by a garbage truck. Later, Marie explains it happened the previous evening when she lost her temper due to the noise of her writer husband Bruce's machine.

Throughout the film Marie regularly breaks the fourth wall, narrating with hate-filled language, and speaking with Bruce with seething sarcasm. Seemingly oblivious, he continually uses terms of endearment hollowly.

Marie flashes back to yesterday after Bruce cried in her arms over the typewriter. At that moment she had decided to leave him. He seems oblivious to her heaping on of verbal invective and sarcastic, pejorative language.

Bruce leaves for a lunch date with his friend Roger, in which they both act strangely flirtatiously, as if the other is saying incredibly interesting things when they are quite mundane. However, they part stiffly.

Marie is befriended by a Golden Retriever, who leads her through a door that magically takes her to a grassy field which she falls asleep on, which later is transformed into waves of the ocean that slowly envelop her. The retriever licks her awake and she heads to the party.

There, Marie is greeted by the host, afterwards mostly ignored. Bruce arrives, flitting between the other guests, making her jealous. He spends little time with her, preferring to be socialising. Marie gets tired, so he suggests she rest where she's sitting, she periodically dreams and wakes to the same mundane conversations.

In one dream, Bruce tells her about fantasizing about a young woman. Rather than acting upon the sexual urge she inspires, he rents a room and watches a woman across the way undress and then rest naked.

At the climactic dinner scene at a restaurant, Marie finally expresses her verbal contempt for Bruce but without much effect. They discuss their future together when Bruce surprises Marie with a gift he bought for the house.

== Cast ==
- Julianne Moore as Marie
- Matthew Broderick as Bruce
- Bob Balaban as Roger
- Julie Hagerty as Party Guest at Frank's
- Campbell Scott as Tommy
- Griffin Dunne as Restaurant Guest
