= El Oso =

Studio album by Soul Coughing
- Released: September 29, 1998
- Recorded: 1998
- Genre: Alternative rock; post-rock; electronic rock; trip hop
- Length: 56:54
- Label: Slash/Warner Bros. Records
- Producer: Soul Coughing; Tchad Blake; Pat Dillett; Optical

Soul Coughing chronology
Irresistible Bliss (1996)	El Oso (1998)	Lust In Phaze (2002)

Singles from El Oso
- 1. "Circles" Released: 1998; 2. "St. Louise Is Listening" Released: 1998; 3. "Rolling" Released: 1999

Professional ratings
Review scores
Source	Rating
AllMusic	4/5 stars
Christgau's Consumer Guide	A−
Entertainment Weekly	B+
NME	4/5 stars
Pitchfork	4.6/10
Rolling Stone	3/5 stars
Spin	5/10

El Oso (Spanish for The Bear) is the third studio album by the New York City band Soul Coughing, released on September 29, 1998, by Slash Records and Warner Bros. Records. The album received generally positive critical reception upon release.

El Oso made it to #1 on KTUH's charts on the week of January 25, 1999.

== Background ==
The album's style takes heavy inspiration from the electronic music style drum and bass, which followed after the band toured with supporting DJs Krust and Die prior to the album's conceptualization; drum and bass DJ and producer Optical was enlisted to co-produce the album. Artist Jim Woodring (Frank) drew the cartoon "monkey-bear" on the disc's cover. The chorus of the song "$300" is a sample of a Chris Rock joke; singer Mike Doughty heard the joke which is backmasked on Rock's live standup album Roll with the New. Curious, Doughty recorded it into his ASR-10 sampler with the intention of simply reversing it and seeing what the joke was, and wrote the song around what he found there.

== In popular culture ==
The album contains their biggest hit single, "Circles". Cartoon Network aired a music video in which a Flintstones cartoon was synched to the song as part of their Groovies interstitial. The music video features Fred, Barney and other Hanna-Barbera characters walking in front of the same repeating background, with subtitles showing existential dialogue. The video for the song "Rolling" was also produced, which was synced with a scene from a Betty Boop cartoon. The song was used in the 2004 remake of Walking Tall. "$300" was used in the House episode "The Softer Side" in 2009.

== Track listing ==
All music by Soul Coughing. All lyrics written by Mike Doughty unless otherwise noted.

1. "Rolling" – 3:36
2. "Misinformed" – 3:25
3. "Circles" – 3:07
4. "Blame" – 5:01
5. "St. Louise Is Listening" – 4:29
6. "Maybe I'll Come Down" – 4:32
7. "Houston" – 4:04
8. "$300" – 3:08
9. "Fully Retractable" – 3:26
10. "Monster Man" – 4:16
11. "Pensacola" (Doughty/Ava Chin) – 4:16
12. "I Miss the Girl" – 4:03
13. "So Far I Have Not Found the Science" – 2:53
14. "The Incumbent" (Doughty/Mark De Gil Antoni) – 6:46
15. "212" (Japanese release bonus track)
16. "Rare Star Ball" (Japanese release bonus track)

== Personnel ==
=== Soul Coughing ===
- Mike Doughty (billed as "M. Doughty") – vocals, guitar, songwriting, keyboards, programming
- Sebastian Steinberg – bass, upright bass, backing vocals, keyboards, programming
- Mark de Gli Antoni – keyboards, programming, Pro Tools editing, songwriting (14)
- Yuval Gabay – drums, keyboards, programming

=== Other personnel ===
- Tchad Blake - producer, mixing, keyboards, programming
- Pat Dillett - producer, mixing, keyboards, programming, overdubs (2)
- Optical - producer, mixing, keyboards, programming (1, 4)
- Ryoji Hata (2, 9, 13, 14), Husky Huskolds (1 to 3, 5 to 7, 8, 10 to 13) - assistant engineering
- Ava Chin - songwriting (10)
- Jim Woodring - cover illustrations
- John Cutcliffe - management
- Bob Ludwig - mastering
- Snorri Bros. - photography
- STAIN - art Direction, design
