= Super Bon Bon =

1996 single by Soul Coughing

Single by Soul Coughing

from the album Irresistible Bliss
- Released: 9 July 1996
- Recorded: 1995
- Studio: Power Station, New York City
- Genre: Alternative rock
- Length: 3:31
- Label: Slash/Warner Bros.
- Songwriters: Mike Doughty; Mark Degli Antoni; Sebastian Steinberg; Yuval Gabay
- Producers: David Kahne, Soul Coughing

Soul Coughing singles chronology
"Soundtrack to Mary" (1996)	"Super Bon Bon" (1996)	"Soft Serve" (1996)

Music video
- "Super Bon Bon" on YouTube

"Super Bon Bon" is a song by the American alternative rock band Soul Coughing, released in 1996 as the second single from the band's second studio album, Irresistible Bliss. It was recorded in 1995 and produced by David Kahne with co-production by the band. The track received significant airplay on alternative rock radio in the United States after its release, became one of the group’s most widely recognized songs and a staple of their catalog.

== Composition ==
The track features a prominent bassline and loop-based percussion typical of the band’s production during the mid-1990s. “Super Bon Bon” has remained one of Soul Coughing’s most recognizable songs from the 1990s alternative rock era. The band has continued to include the track in setlists during reunion performances and anniversary shows.

== Releases ==
“Super Bon Bon” was released as a commercial single in 1996 by Slash Records as part of the promotion for Irresistible Bliss. The CD single featured remixes by the Propellerheads. An official music video for “Super Bon Bon” was released in conjunction with the single and was directed by Jamie Caliri. Other mixes were included on editions of the album and subsequent compilations, like 2002's Lust In Phaze: The Best of Soul Coughing and Mike Doughty's 2013 solo take for his album Circles..

== Reception ==
Press coverage of Irresistible Bliss highlighted “Super Bon Bon” as one of the album’s prominent tracks and noted the band’s use of rhythm and Doughty’s vocal delivery.

In the United States, “Super Bon Bon” reached number 27 on the Billboard Alternative Airplay (Modern Rock Tracks) chart following its release. In the United Kingdom, it charted at number 190 on the UK Singles Chart in 1997. In 2024, the single re-entered British sales charts, reaching number 39 on the Official Singles Sales Chart and number 35 on the Official Singles Downloads Chart.

=== Charts ===
Year	Chart	Peak position
1996	US Billboard Alternative Airplay	27
1996	UK Singles Chart	190
2024	UK Official Singles Sales Chart	39
2024	UK Official Singles Downloads Chart	35

== Media usage ==
- Entrance theme song for professional wrestling tag team Danny Doring and Roadkill in Extreme Championship Wrestling from 1998 to 2001.
- Racing video game Gran Turismo 2 in 1999.
- Baseball video game The Bigs 2 in 2009.
- Car theft scene in the fifth-season finale of Homicide: Life on the Street.
- The Sopranos episode "Long Term Parking".
- Season 8 episode 5 of USA's Psych
- Season 4 episode 8 of ABC's Castle,
- Season 6 episode 2 of NBC's The Blacklist.
- Featured on ESPN and Netflix's 2020 docuseries The Last Dance.
- Season 2, Episode 7 of Reacher in 2024.

== CD single track listing ==
1. “Super Bon Bon” – 3:31
2. “Super Bon Bon (Propellerheads Radio Edit)” – 3:54
3. "Super Bon Bon (Propellerheads Mezzanine Mix) – 5:38
4. "Casiotone Nation (Live)" – 5:04

== Personnel ==
- Mike Doughty – vocals, guitar
- Sebastian Steinberg – bass, backing vocals
- Mark Degli Antoni – keyboards, programming
- Yuval Gabay – drums, programming
- David Kahne, Soul Coughing – production
