= Fire Truck (disambiguation) =

A fire truck is an emergency road vehicle for firefighters.

Fire Truck may also refer to:

- Fire Truck (video game), a black-and-white arcade game
- "Fire Truck", a song by NCT 127 from the EP NCT 127
- "(Firetruck?)", a song by Mike Doughty from the album Smofe + Smang: Live in Minneapolis
