= Lust in Phaze =

Lust In Phaze: The Best of Soul Coughing

Compilation album by Soul Coughing
- Released: March 19, 2002
- Recorded: 1993–1998
- Genre: Alternative rock
- Label: Slash / Warner Bros. Records
- Producer: Cole Cartwright, Soul Coughing, et al.

Soul Coughing chronology
El Oso (1998)	Lust In Phaze: The Best of Soul Coughing (2002)	LIVE 2024 (2025)

Professional ratings
Review scores
Source	Rating
AllMusic	4.5/5 stars

Lust in Phaze is a 2002 'best of' compilation album composed of tracks recorded by the band Soul Coughing. The album title comes from a lyric in their song "Soft Serve", which does not appear on this album. The album is composed of, in order, six tracks from the LP Ruby Vroom, "Buddha Rhubarb Butter" from the Warner Bros. sampler album Trademark of Quality™, "Unmarked Helicopters" from the X-Files tribute album Songs in the Key of X, six tracks from Irresistible Bliss, four tracks from El Oso, and, from the UK single for "Super Bon Bon", a live version of "Casiotone Nation" and the Propellerheads' radio edit remix of "Super Bon Bon".

== Track listing ==
1. "Bus to Beelzebub" (From Ruby Vroom)
2. "Sugar Free Jazz" (From Ruby Vroom)
3. "True Dreams of Wichita" (From Ruby Vroom)
4. "Screenwriter's Blues" (From Ruby Vroom)
5. "Janine" (From Ruby Vroom)
6. "Blueeyed Devil" (From Ruby Vroom)
7. "Buddha Rhubarb Butter" (From "Down to This" single)
8. "Unmarked Helicopters" (From Songs in the Key of X)
9. "Super Bon Bon" (From Irresistible Bliss)
10. "Soundtrack to Mary" (From Irresistible Bliss)
11. "Lazybones" (From Irresistible Bliss)
12. "Paint" (From Irresistible Bliss)
13. "Collapse" (From Irresistible Bliss)
14. "The Idiot Kings" (From Irresistible Bliss)
15. "Rolling" (From El Oso)
16. "St. Louise is Listening" (Edit) (From El Oso)
17. "$300" (Edit) (From El Oso)
18. "Circles" (Edit) (From El Oso)
19. "Super Bon Bon" (Propellerheads Radio Edit) (From "Super Bon Bon" single)
20. "Casiotone Nation" (Live) (From "Super Bon Bon" single)

== See also ==
- 2002 in music
