= The Lo-Fi Lodge =

Studio album by Mike Doughty
- Released: April 27 – November 30, 2012
- Genre: Rock
- Label: SNACK BAR Records

Mike Doughty chronology
The Question Jar Show (2012)	The Lo-Fi Lodge (2012)	The Flip Is Another Honey (2012)

The Lo-Fi Lodge is a subscription based album by Mike Doughty. Fans were able to sign up during spring 2012 to receive one song per week, for 32 weeks. The songs included acoustic versions of previously released material, demos and alternate versions of songs, as well as songs that were never released in any form. Doughty also mentioned that the songs from the Evenhand soundtrack would be released through this album.

== Track listing ==
No.	Title	Length
1.	"Grey Ghost (Version Produced by Pat Dilllett and Dougie Bowne, 2003)"	3:53
2.	"Steer/Drupe/Gateau (Studio Polyphemu, 2006) (demo of "Navigating By The Stars at Night")"	4:31
3.	"Wednesday (acoustic version; Dan Wilson's ballroom, March 2006)"	3:29
4.	"Dang, Bruce, No Kill Fee? (demo of "Unsingable Name")"	4:35
5.	"All the Time (Dan Wilson's ballroom, 2002) (previously unreleased song)"	3:54
6.	"Love the Fat Man, Part One (Studio Polyphemus, 2006) (demo of "More Bacon Than the Pan Can Handle")"	1:59
7.	"Blue Dress (Depswa’s Dump, February 2006)"	3:37
8.	"I’m Still Drinking In My Dreams (Haughty Melodic Sessions)"	4:34
9.	"Procession of Cop Cars (from “Evenhand”) (alternate version of "The Devilish Verve of the Age Is Like a Man With a Staple Gun")"	4:50
10.	"Makelloser Mann (Koreatown, 2010)"	1:17
11.	"Blue Dress (Dan Wilson's ballroom, March 2006)"	3:22
12.	"Walk the Plank (Werkstatt Polyphemus, 2006) (previously unreleased song)"	3:34
13.	"Tremendous Brunettes (79 Rivington Street, 2003)"	2:45
14.	"She Drinks 7-Up From the Skull of a Flunky (previously unreleased song)"	2:25
15.	"Busting Up a Strbxxxx (79 Rivington Street, January 2003)"	3:01
16.	"Never Known to Nap (79 Rivington Street, June 10, 2002) (demo of "(I Want to) Burn You (Down)")"	3:27
17.	"Unsingable Name (Version Produced by Pat Dillett and Dougie Bowne, 2003)"	4:19
18.	"White Lexus (79 Rivington Street, June 2002)"	2:32
19.	"Booty Czar (79 Rivington Street, December 2002) (previously unreleased song)"	3:18
20.	"I Love Surprises (Koreatown, 2010) (previously unreleased song)"	1:40
21.	"I Know That You Know (Depswa’s Dump, February 2006) (previously unreleased song)"	4:01
22.	"Like a Luminous Girl (Dan Wilson’s ballroom, March 2006)"	3:13
23.	"Have At It (Koreatown, 2010)"	1:24
24.	"Love the Fat Man, Part Two (with Biet Simkin; from the Dubious Luxury Sessions) (previously unreleased song)"	2:36
25.	"I Hear the Bells (79 Rivington Street, 2003)"	3:44
26.	"Navigating by the Stars at Night (Werkstatt Polyphemus, 2006)"	4:20
27.	"You Can’t Be a Friend to Everyone (from “Evenhand”)"	2:50
28.	"Sweet Francis (from “Evenhand”)"	3:56
29.	"(You Should Be) Doubly (Gratified) (Yaddo Version)"	3:15
30.	"Like a Luminous Girl (Depswa's Dump, February, 2006)"	3:40
31.	"I Wrote a Song About Your Car (Depswa's Dump, February, 2006)"	3:32
32.	"(I Keep On) Rising Up (Yaddo Version)"	3:14
