= Smofe + Smang: Live in Minneapolis =

Live album by Mike Doughty
- Released: July 8, 2002
- Recorded: February 27, 2002
- Genre: Rock
- Length: 65:53
- Label: self-released
- Producer: Mike Doughty

Mike Doughty chronology
Skittish (2000)	Smofe + Smang: Live in Minneapolis (2002)	Rockity Roll (2003)

Smofe + Smang: Live in Minneapolis is a live album by Mike Doughty recorded at the Woman's Club Theater in Minneapolis on February 27, 2002. It was his second solo release, and was only available in a limited edition of 2500.

Now out of print, copies of the original CD have sold on eBay for as much as $200. An abridged version titled Half Smofe was released in December 2007 featuring 11 of the 18 songs from the original album.

The album featured an intro—meant to baffle—spoken entirely in Spanish by Doughty's childhood friend Matthew Saldivar. It details a childhood incident in which Doughty accused him of stealing his Batman doll.

Smofe is a document of Doughty's honed touring act around that time, featuring pop-culture jokes, stark versions of tunes he wrote for Soul Coughing, and a disarming, off-the-cuff, audience-interactive style. On the songs "Sunkeneyed Girl" and "Grey Ghost," Doughty jokes that he hasn't written bridges for the tunes, and fills the space with "fake words" in the latter, and a "riff from the 80s" in the former. Also, the tune "Lisa Ling and Lucy Liu" later re-emerged on the EP Rockity Roll, revamped as "27 Jennifers."

== Track listing ==
All songs written by Mike Doughty unless otherwise noted.

=== Original Release ===
1. "(Introduction)"
2. "Lazybones"
3. "Sunkeneyed Girl"
4. "(Fuckin' Yeah)"
5. "The Only Answer"
6. "Busting Up a Starbux"
7. "Maybe I'll Come Down"
8. "Madeleine and Nine"
9. "(Bucket of Shoes in My Foyer)"
10. "Thank You, Lord, For Sending Me the F Train"
11. "Rising Sign"
12. "(Firetruck?)"
13. "Grey Ghost"
14. "(Do You Like Robots?)"
15. "Soft Serve"
16. "Lisa Ling and Lucy Liu"
17. "His Truth Is Marching On"
18. "(Real World/Road Rules)"
19. "St. Louise Is Listening"
20. "True Dreams of Wichita"
21. "Circles"
22. "(Go Stand Over There)"
23. "Train to Chicago" (cover of a tune by Drink Me)
24. "Firetruck"
25. "Janine"

=== Half Smofe reissue ===
1. "Lazybones"
2. "Sunkeneyed Girl"
3. "Busting Up a Starbucks"
4. "Maybe I'll Come Down"
5. "Madeleine and Nine"
6. "Thank You, Lord, For Sending Me the F Train"
7. "Rising Sign"
8. "Grey Ghost"
9. "Soft Serve"
10. "True Dreams of Wichita"
11. "Train to Chicago" (cover of a tune by Drink Me)
