= The Question Jar Show =

Live album by Mike Doughty
- Released: January 31, 2012
- Genre: Rock
- Label: SNACK BAR Records
- Producer: Mike Doughty

Mike Doughty chronology
Yes and Also Yes (2011)	The Question Jar Show (2012)	The Lo-Fi Lodge (2012)

The Question Jar Show is a two-disk live album by singer Mike Doughty. It includes live acoustic recordings performed by himself with his partner Andrew "Scrap" Livingston. In between some songs, the duo answer questions that audience members wrote and placed in a jar at the front of the stage before the shows started.

== Track listing ==
No.	Title	Length
1.	"Looking at the World From the Bottom of a Well"
2.	"Busting Up a Starbucks"
3.	"(Octopi/Tangelo/Killing)"
4.	"I Keep on Rising Up"
5.	"Ossining"
6.	"(Virgins/Bridget/Twister)"
7.	"You Should Be Doubly Gratified"
8.	"I Wrote a Song About Your Car"
9.	"Like a Luminous Girl"
10.	"(Stripper/Naked/Real Love)"
11.	"Shunned and Falsified"
12.	"Rising Sign"
13.	"He's Got the Whole World in his Hands"
14.	"Madeline and Nine"
15.	"(Fresh/Famous/Zombie)"
16.	"Nectarine (Part 2)"
17.	"Navigating by the Stars at Night"
18.	"Down on the River by the Sugar Plant"
19.	"I Hear the Bells"
20.	"(Keeping Watch Over Some Cow)"
21.	"(Tattoos/King Diamond/Repertoire)"
22.	"Grey Ghost"
23.	"Tremendous Brunettes"
24.	"I Want to Burn You Down"
25.	"27 Jennifers"
26.	"(Tomb/Girlfriend/Break the Rules)"
27.	"Put it Down / Pleasure on Credit"
28.	"Your Misfortune"
