= Stellar Motel =

Studio album by Mike Doughty
- Released: September 16, 2014
- Genre: Indie rock
- Length: 48:57
- Label: Snack Bar / Megaforce Records
- Producer: Rich Matthew

Mike Doughty chronology
Water and Washington (2013)	Stellar Motel (2014)	The Heart Watches While the Brain Burns (2016)

Stellar Motel is a studio album by indie rock artist Mike Doughty. It was released in 2014.

== Track listing ==
1. Light Will Keep Your Heart Beating in the Future (3:15)
2. When the Night Is Long (3:35)
3. Oh My God Yeah Fuck It (feat. Moon Hooch and Miss Eaves) (3:14)
4. Raging On (2:50)
5. Let Me Lie (feat. Big Dipper) (3:02)
6. These Are Your Friends (3:07)
7. Let's Go to the Motherfucking Movies (3:19)
8. The Champion (feat. MC Frontalot and Laura Lee Bishop) (3:57)
9. Pretty Wild (feat. Ash Wednesday, Clara Bizna$$ and Uncle Meg from Hand Job Academy) (2:38)
10. When You Come Home (2:40)
11. 走馬灯 (feat. Kim from Uhnellys) (1:32)
12. Change (2:40)
13. To See the Sun Come Down (feat. Jay Boogie and Andrew 'Scrap' Livingston) (3:31)
14. The Brightness (3:20)
15. In the Rising Sun (feat. Laura Lee Bishop) (3:32)
16. Better Days Come Around (2:39)
