= Tall Firs =

American folk rock band

- Origin: Annapolis, Maryland, US
- Genres: Indie rock, folk rock
- Years active: 1990–present
- Labels: Ecstatic Peace!
- Members: Aaron Mullan; David Mies; Ryan Sawyer
- Website: www.tallfirs.org

Tall Firs are an American, New York City based underground electric folk rock band, originally formed in 1990 by teenagers Dave Mies and Aaron Mullan in Annapolis, Maryland. Their album, Tall Firs, was completed and released sixteen years later in 2006 on the independent music label Ecstatic Peace!.

Tall Firs grew out of an over-the-phone collaboration between Mies and Mullan, school friends who lived too far apart to walk to one another's houses. Allegedly, the two sat at home and cued up cassettes from the Circle Jerks and Sex Pistols to play over simultaneously. They did not play their first concert until eleven years later.

== History ==
In 2009, Tall Firs and Soft Location formed the supergroup Glass Rock and released an album called Tall Firs Meet Soft Location on Ecstatic Peace!

Tall Firs were chosen to perform at the All Tomorrow's Parties festival that he curated in March 2012 in Minehead, England.

In November 2013, the band played the final holiday camp edition of the All Tomorrow's Parties festival in Camber Sands, England.
