= Yes and Also Yes =

Studio album by Mike Doughty
- Released: August 30, 2011
- Genre: Rock
- Length: 38:21
- Label: SNACK BAR Records
- Producer: Pat Dillett

Mike Doughty chronology
Sad Man Happy Man (2009)	Yes and Also Yes (2011)	The Question Jar Show (2012)

Yes and Also Yes is Mike Doughty's fourth proper studio album, released in 2011. The album was released under Doughty's label SNACK BAR, and through Megaforce Records. Doughty left his previous label, ATO Records, so he could have more control over his shop and business.

== Track listing ==
No.	Title	Length
1.	"Na Na Nothing"	3:18
2.	"Into the Un"	3:21
3.	"Day By Day By"	3:04
4.	"Holiday (What Do You Want?)" (featuring Rosanne Cash)	3:15
5.	"Russell"	1:33
6.	"Strike the Motion"	2:28
7.	"Have At It"	1:19
8.	"Makelloser Mann"	1:17
9.	"The Huffer and the Cutter"	3:23
10.	"Rational Man"	3:53
11.	"Telegenic Exes, #1 (Hapless Dancers)"	1:47
12.	"Weird Summer"	3:11
13.	"Vegetable"	3:35
14.	"Telegenic Exes, #2 (Astoria)"	2:57
