= Ruby Vroom =

Studio album by Soul Coughing
- Released: September 27, 1994
- Recorded: April–June 1994
- Studios: Sound Factory, Hollywood
- Genres: Alternative rock, jazz fusion, alternative hip-hop
- Length: 61:27
- Labels: Slash/Warner Bros. Records; 45752
- Producer: Tchad Blake

Soul Coughing chronology
| Ruby Vroom (1994) | Irresistible Bliss (1996) |

Singles from Ruby Vroom
- 1. "Down to This" Released: 1994; 2. "Sugar Free Jazz" Released: 1995; 3. "Screenwriter's Blues" Released: 1995

Ruby Vroom is the debut studio album by American rock band Soul Coughing, released in 1994. The album's sound is a mixture of sample-based tunes (loops of Raymond Scott's "Powerhouse" on "Bus to Beelzebub", Toots and the Maytals, Howlin' Wolf, the Andrews Sisters, and the Roches on "Down to This", and a loop of sampler player Mark Degli Antoni's orchestral horns on "Screenwriter's Blues", among others). It also features guitar-based tunes like "Janine", "Moon Sammy", and "Supra Genius" and jazzy, upright-bass-fueled songs that often quoted other material—the theme from Courageous Cat on "Is Chicago, Is Not Chicago", Thelonious Monk's "Misterioso" on "Casiotone Nation", and Bobby McFerrin's cover of Joan Armatrading's "Opportunity" on "Uh, Zoom Zip". On September 12, 2024, the band announced on Jimmy Kimmel Live! that a remastered 30th anniversary version of the album would be released on CD and vinyl, which includes bonus songs from the era.

The album sold approximately 70,000 copies, as of April 1996, according to Billboard.

== Title ==
Ruby Vroom was named after a mispronunciation of the name of Ruby Froom, daughter of record producer Mitchell Froom—a frequent collaborator of Ruby producer Tchad Blake—and singer-songwriter Suzanne Vega.

== Recording ==
The album was recorded at Sunset Sound Factory in Hollywood, Blake and Froom's usual workspace—a storage room near the studio's lounge was filled with vintage keyboards and road cases filled with toys, including whistles, baby rattles, and children's toy xylophones. Many of these ended up in the songs, such as a train whistle played by band founder Mike Doughty on "Uh, Zoom Zip". This was in keeping with Tchad Blake's spirit of maverick experimentation, which included sticking a binaural head-shaped microphone in front of Yuval Gabay's drumkit, sticking a mic in a car muffler, called "the Bone", and sticking that in the drum booth as well, and having Doughty improvise wild, yelling ad-libs on "Casiotone Nation", singing into a cheap amplification system called an Ahuja that Blake bought in India. The speaker was essentially a huge bullhorn atop a stick.

The album's lone guest is Rachel Benbow Murdy, Doughty's ex-girlfriend, who supplies a vocal on "Janine". Doughty had Murdy go out to a payphone in Sheridan Square in New York and sing a rendition of "Lemon Tree" with an improvised melody into their answering machine. A year before the Ruby sessions, Doughty and bass player Sebastian Steinberg recorded the tune at the avant-garde jazz club the Knitting Factory during the daytime, when the club was closed, with club soundperson James McLean. McLean put a mic on the answering machine, which Doughty had brought to the session.

== Critical reception ==
Professional ratings
Review scores
| Source | Rating |
|---|---|
| AllMusic | 4.5/5 stars |
| Christgau's Consumer Guide | A |
| Entertainment Weekly | A |
| The Guardian | 3/4 stars |
| NME | 5/10 |
| The Philadelphia Inquirer | 4/4 stars |
| Pitchfork | 8.7/10 |
| Rolling Stone | 4/5 stars |
| The Rolling Stone Album Guide | 4/5 stars |
| Vox | 7/10 |

Ruby Vroom was positively received by critics. Entertainment Weekly journalist Steven Mirkin described the album as "elegantly spare, dramatic, and danceable", and Rolling Stone's Michael Azerrad applauded Soul Coughing for combining its disparate genre influences into "a compelling and profoundly original sound". The sampling work of keyboardist Mark de Gli Antoni was singled out for particular praise: Azerrad stated that Antoni "revolutionize[d] what sampling can do as a rhythmic, harmonic, textural and melodic tool", while Sean Westergaard of AllMusic opined that he "set the bar for sampler players in the pop world". Vocalist Mike Doughty was also praised for his work, with critics noting that he was able to effectively balance wry cynicism against earnest descriptiveness. Robert Christgau argued that, on Ruby Vroom, Soul Coughing demonstrated stronger musicianship than other acts who shared the band's "hipster cynicism".

In a retrospective review from AllMusic, Ruby Vroom was labeled "one of the great debut albums of the '90s". Writing for Pitchfork, Mark Richardson credited Soul Coughing with creating "a brand-new sound that is inextricably linked to its era", adding, "The best music is often said to be 'timeless,' but sometimes records like this one, which are very much of their time, are even more fascinating."

== Track listing ==
1. "Is Chicago, Is Not Chicago" – 3:48
2. "Sugar Free Jazz" – 3:55
3. "Casiotone Nation" – 3:50
4. "Blueeyed Devil" – 4:12
5. "Bus to Beelzebub" – 4:33
6. "True Dreams of Wichita" – 5:00
7. "Screenwriter's Blues" – 5:08
8. "Moon Sammy" – 4:09
9. "Supra Genius" – 3:59
10. "City of Motors" – 4:38
11. "Uh, Zoom Zip" – 3:56
12. "Down to This" – 3:49
13. "Mr. Bitterness" – 5:32
14. "Janine" – 4:58

== Remastered 30th anniversary edition track listing ==
1. "Is Chicago, Is Not Chicago" – 3:47
2. "Sugar Free Jazz" – 3:55
3. "Casiotone Nation" – 3:50
4. "Blueeyed Devil" – 4:12
5. "Bus to Beelzebub" – 4:34
6. "True Dreams of Wichita" – 5:00
7. "Screenwriter's Blues" – 5:04
8. "Moon Sammy" – 4:09
9. "Supra Genius" – 3:59
10. "City of Motors" – 4:39
11. "Uh, Zoom Zip" – 3:56
12. "Down to This" – 3:50
13. "Mr. Bitterness" – 5:29
14. "Janine" – 4:58
15. "Buddha Rhubarb Butter" – 3:31
16. "Murder of Lawyers" – 7:14
17. "Amy Fisher" – 2:35
18. "Theme from Rachel's Sitcom" – 1:08
19. "Screenwriter's Blues (Mood Swing Mix)" – 6:29

== Personnel ==
- Mike Doughty (billed as "M. Doughty") – vocals, guitar
- Sebastian Steinberg – bass guitar, upright bass, backing vocals, sampler
- Mark de Gli Antoni – keyboards, programming
- Yuval Gabay – drums, programming
