= The Heart Watches While the Brain Burns =

Studio album by Mike Doughty
- Released: October 14, 2016
- Genre: Indie rock
- Label: Self-released

Mike Doughty chronology
Stellar Motel (2014)	The Heart Watches; While the Brain Burns (2016)

Professional ratings
Review scores
Source	Rating
AllMusic	3.5/5 stars

The Heart Watches While the Brain Burns is American singer-songwriter Mike Doughty's ninth studio album and 19th overall, released on October 14, 2016. It was produced by DJ Good Goose. The album's title is a reference to an anecdote told in an episode of the podcast WTF with Marc Maron. Much of the album's content was inspired by Doughty's relocation from New York City to Memphis, Tennessee. The song "I Can't Believe I Found You in That Town" was released as a digital single ahead of the album's release.

== Track listing ==
All tracks are written by Mike Doughty.

The Heart Watches While the Brain Burns track listing
No.	Title	Length
1.	"Wait! You'll Find a Better Way"	3:11
2.	"I Can't Believe I Found You in That Town"	3:23
3.	"Brian"	2:53
4.	"There Is a Way Out"	2:56
5.	"Sad Girl Walking in the Rain"	2:33
6.	"Dawn / Gone"	3:37
7.	"You Could Fly"	2:18
8.	"Otherlands"	3:25
9.	"Don't Jerk the Wheel"	1:47
10.	"Making Me Lay Down"	3:17
11.	"Give Me Something"	2:21
12.	"The Wild Creatures"	4:08
