= Sad Man Happy Man =

Studio album by Mike Doughty
- Released: October 6, 2009
- Genre: Rock
- Length: 33:33
- Label: ATO Records
- Producer: Pat Dillett, Mike Doughty, David Kahne (track 3)

Mike Doughty chronology
Golden Delicious (2008)	Sad Man Happy Man (2009)	Yes and Also Yes (2011)

Professional ratings
Review scores
Source	Rating
AllMusic	4/5 stars
Consequence of Sound	B

Sad Man Happy Man is a studio album by Mike Doughty, released in 2009 on ATO Records.

== Critical reception ==
The album received positive reviews. The Associated Press wrote that "the subtle folk-rock diversity goes from dark ('I Want To Burn You Down') to soaring ('Year Of The Dog') and is rounded out by tight grooves ('Pleasure On Credit') and jangling love songs ('Diane' and the delightfully offbeat 'Lorna Zauberberg')."

== Track listing ==
1. "Nectarine (Part Two)" – 2:26
2. "(I Keep On) Rising Up" – 3:25
3. "(You Should Be) Doubly (Gratified)" – 3:07
4. "Lorna Zauberberg" – 3:02
5. "(I Want To) Burn You (Down)" – 2:01
6. "Pleasure on Credit" – 2:48
7. "Lord Lord Help Me Just to Rock Rock On" – 2:57
8. "(He’s Got The) Whole World (In His Hands)" – 2:40
9. "(When I) Box the Days (Up)" – 2:12
10. "Year of the Dog" – 2:30
11. "Diane" – 2:02
12. "How to Fuck a Republican" – 2:52
13. "Casper the Friendly Ghost" (Daniel Johnston cover) – 1:32

=== iTunes bonus tracks ===
1. "Three Is a Magic Number" (from Schoolhouse Rock) – 3:23
2. "Night World" – 2:07
3. "Firefly" (American Music Club cover) – 2:34
4. "Let the Moon Get Into It" (Soft Location cover) – 3:11
5. "We Will Not Be Lovers" (The Waterboys cover) – 4:27
