= Golden Delicious (album) =

Studio album by Mike Doughty
- Released: February 19, 2008
- Genre: Rock
- Length: 37:18
- Label: ATO Records
- Producer: Dan Wilson

Mike Doughty chronology
The Gambler (2005)	Golden Delicious (2008)	Sad Man Happy Man (2009)

Professional ratings
Review scores
Source	Rating
Allmusic	link
Robert Christgau	(2-star Honorable Mention)
Paste Magazine	link
jambase.com	link

Golden Delicious is the second studio album by American singer-songwriter Mike Doughty, released on February 19, 2008.

== Track listing ==
1. "Fort Hood"
2. "I Just Want the Girl in the Blue Dress to Keep On Dancing"
3. "Put It Down"
4. "More Bacon Than the Pan Can Handle"
5. "27 Jennifers"
6. "I Wrote a Song About Your Car"
7. "I Got the Drop on You"
8. "Wednesday (No Se Apoye)"
9. "Like a Luminous Girl"
10. "Nectarine (Part One)"
11. "Navigating by the Stars at Night"
12. "Book of Love" [iTunes Only (Magnetic Fields cover)]

=== Busking EP ===
Select versions of the album included the Busking EP, which included 5 songs from the limited album "Busking", which had 12 tracks total.

1. "Looking at the World From the Bottom of a Well"
2. "F Train"
3. "The Only Answer"
4. "40 Grand"
5. "Sunkeneyed Girl"
