= Rockity Roll =

EP by Mike Doughty
- Released: 2003
- Recorded: May 27–28, 2003
- Genre: Rock
- Length: 17:18
- Label: (self-released)
- Producer: Pat Dillett

Mike Doughty chronology
Smofe + Smang: Live in Minneapolis (2002)	Rockity Roll (2003)	Skittish / Rockity Roll (2004)

Rockity Roll was the third solo recording released by Mike Doughty after the breakup of his former band, Soul Coughing. It is a six-song EP which he recorded in New York City over two days in May 2003 at Pat Dillett's tiny, windowless cubby at Kampo studios.

Everything on the record was recorded by Doughty: vocal, acoustic guitar, and programming done on a lo-fi Roland Groovebox.

The self-released version of Rockity Roll is out of print; it is currently available (with bonus tracks) as part of the Skittish / Rockity Roll two disc re-release.

In a joint review for Rockity Roll and Skittish, Pitchfork gave a rating of 7.5 and noted, "Rockity Roll dresses up similar, but lesser, songs in dinky keyboards and drum machines, and yet, for everything he adds, this mini-album seems to lose something."

== Track listing ==
All songs written and performed by Mike Doughty.

1. "Ways + Means" – 3:06
2. "27 Jennifers" – 2:49
3. "Down on the River by the Sugar Plant" – 3:07
4. "40 Grand in the Hole" – 2:15
5. "Ossining" – 2:37
6. "Cash Cow" – 3:22
