= The Flip Is Another Honey =

Studio album by Mike Doughty
- Released: November 6, 2012
- Genre: Indie Rock
- Label: SNACK BAR Records

Mike Doughty chronology
The Lo-Fi Lodge (2012)	The Flip Is Another Honey (2012)	Circles, Super Bon Bon, and The Very Best Of Soul Coughing (2013)

The Flip Is Another Honey is a studio album by Mike Doughty composed of covers of songs by John Denver, Cheap Trick, Stephen Sondheim, Thin Lizzy, Camille, and others intermingled with his own original music.

== Track listing ==
No.	Title	Length
1.	"Sunshine"	3:38
2.	"A Fanfare [Instrumental]"	0:28
3.	"Jimmy Bell"	4:28
4.	"Take Me Home, Country Roads (Featuring Rosanne Cash)"	3:14
5.	"Southern Girls"	3:14
6.	"Tightrope"	4:03
7.	"Send In The Clowns [Instrumental]"	0:59
8.	"Running Back"	3:42
9.	"Sit Down, You're Rocking The Boat"	1:45
10.	"Boy + Angel"	4:27
11.	"Reach Out/Higher State Of Consciousness"	5:48
12.	"Ta Douleur"	5:09
13.	"God's Song (That's Why I Love Mankind)"	2:42
14.	"Mistress"	3:47
15.	"Words"	4:07
16.	"Honey's Ghost, No. 1 (iTunes Bonus Track)"	5:03
17.	"Honey's Ghost, No. 2 (iTunes Bonus Track)"	6:25
18.	"Honey's Ghost, No. 3 (iTunes Bonus Track)"	4:28
