= Mike Doughty =

American singer-songwriter and author

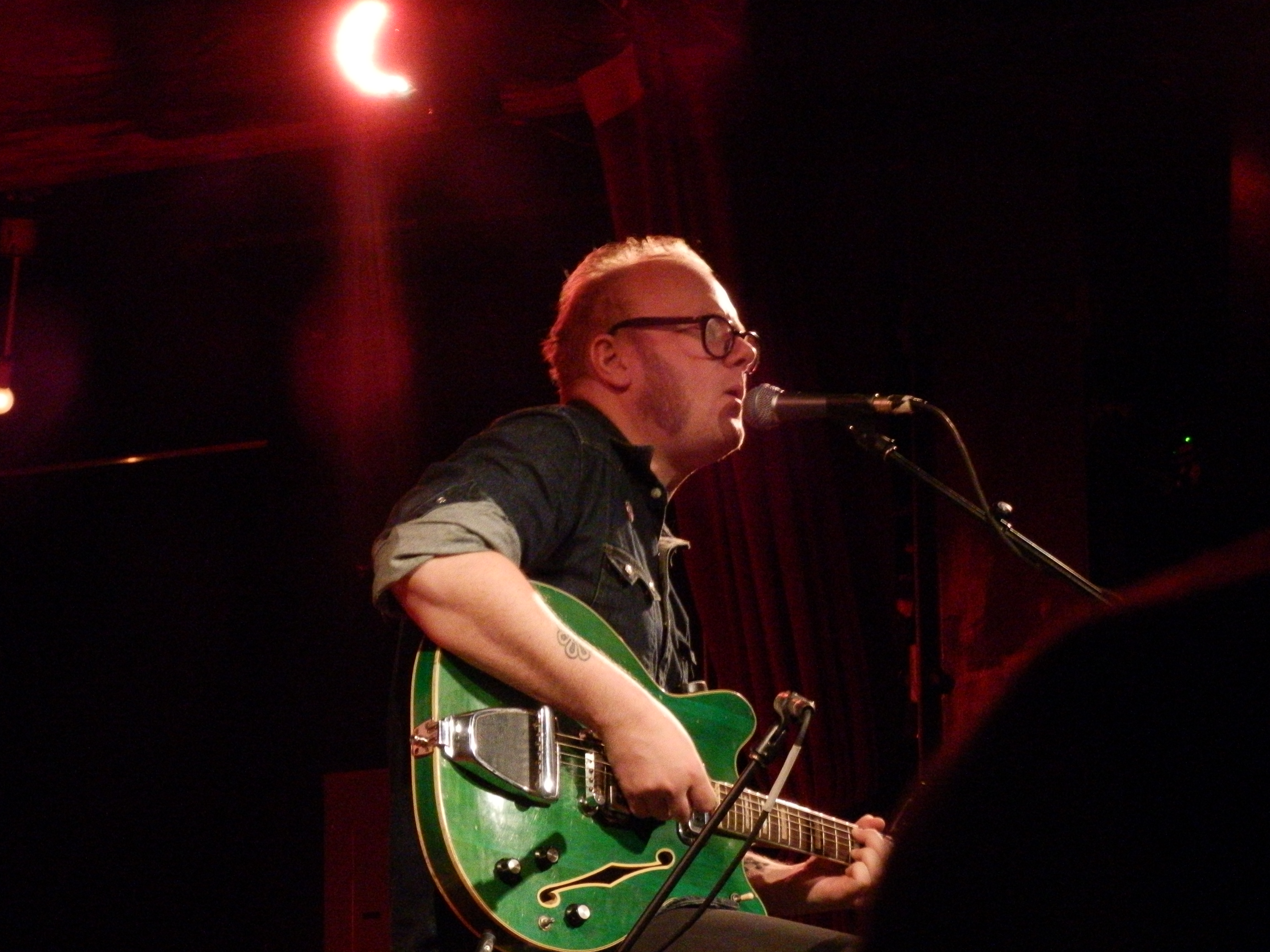
- Mike Doughty at the City Winery NYC November 24, 2012

Background information
- Also known as: M. Doughty
- Born: Michael Ross Doughty; June 10, 1970 (age 56); Fort Knox, Kentucky
- Genres: Alternative rock; alternative hip hop; electronic; trip hop
- Instruments: Vocals, guitar
- Years active: 1992–present
- Labels: ATO; MapleMusic Recordings (Canada); Megaforce Records; Mod y Vi
- Website: www.mikedoughty.com

Michael Ross Doughty (/ˈdoʊti/ DOH-tee; born June 10, 1970) is an American singer-songwriter and author. He founded the band Soul Coughing in 1992, and as of The Heart Watches While the Brain Burns (2016), has released 18 studio albums, live albums, and EPs, all since 2000.

== Early life ==
Doughty is the son of military historian and U.S. Army officer Robert A. Doughty. He grew up on army bases throughout the United States, including Fort Knox, Fort Hood, and Fort Leavenworth, and spent his teenage years living on the grounds of the United States Military Academy at West Point where his father taught. He came to New York City at age 19 to study poetry at The New School. Singer-songwriter Ani DiFranco was one of his classmates in Sekou Sundiata's poetry course, "The Shape and Nature of Things to Come".

== Career ==
=== Soul Coughing ===
While a doorman at the New York club The Knitting Factory (in that era, a hotbed of avant-garde jazz), Doughty founded Soul Coughing. The band released three critically and commercially successful albums, Ruby Vroom (1994), Irresistible Bliss (1996) and El Oso (1998). The greatest hits album Lust in Phaze was released in 2002. In 2024, a reunion tour was announced, spanning from September to October 2024.

=== Solo career ===
Doughty broke up Soul Coughing in 2000 due to personal problems: He was wearying of the band, and he was addicted to opiate painkillers, heroin, and alcohol. He was promptly dropped by Warner Brothers, and began traveling in a rental car (covering 9,000 miles on his first tour) playing acoustic shows. After shows he would sit at the front of the stage and sell copies of his acoustic album Skittish — then on CD-Rs in plain white sleeves. Warner Brothers had rejected the record in 1996. During his three-year tour, Doughty sold 20,000 copies of Skittish and gradually developed a following independent of Soul Coughing. Doughty collaborated with BT on "Never Gonna Come Back Down" providing lyrics and vocals. "Never Gonna Come Back Down" was contained on BT's album Movement in Still Life, released in 1999.

He remained without a label until, when playing the Bonnaroo music festival in 2004, Doughty bumped into Dave Matthews, a longtime Soul Coughing fan who had had the band open for him on two US tours, including shows at Madison Square Garden. When Matthews professed to be a fan of Doughty's solo record Rockity Roll and the song "27 Jennifers", Doughty gave him a CD with rough mixes of an album he had been working on in Minneapolis with singer-songwriter and producer Dan Wilson. Doughty had been introduced to Wilson through their mutual artist manager, Jim Grant. Matthews eventually released the album on his ATO label as Haughty Melodic (an anagram for 'Michael Doughty'.) Haughty Melodic's singles "Looking at the World from the Bottom of a Well" and "I Hear the Bells" were each featured on episodes of Grey's Anatomy and Veronica Mars, and Doughty appeared on the Late Show with David Letterman, marking a return to the musical mainstream. He has since released a number of follow-up albums. Some of Doughty's albums, including Circles, Super Bon Bon and The Very Best of Soul Coughing, Live at Ken’s, and Stellar Motel, have used crowdfunding to finance their creation. He has also used Patreon to release a song every week for those paying $5 a month.

In 2012, Doughty published a memoir called The Book of Drugs, covering his formative years as a musician, what he called the "dark, abusive marriage" that was Soul Coughing, and his experiences with addiction and recovery.

In 2014, Mike Doughty created a rock opera based on the Book of Revelation called Revelation.

In 2015, he moved to Memphis, Tennessee.

In 2019, Doughty mounted a U.S. tour in honor of the 25th anniversary of Ruby Vroom in which he played the album in its entirety.

In May 2020, Doughty published his second memoir titled I Die Each Time I Hear The Sound: A Memoir, which he wrote to expound upon his musical tastes and how they came to be.

In August 2020, Doughty announced his new project Ghost of Vroom with longtime collaborator Andrew "Scrap" Livingston.

== Solo discography ==
Year	Album	Chart peaks	Label	Notes
Year	Album	US	Label	Notes
2000	Skittish	−	self-released	Recorded July 5, 1996
2002	Smofe + Smang: Live in Minneapolis	−	self-released	Live album recorded at the Woman's Club Theater in Minneapolis on February 27, 2002. Release in a limited edition of 2500.
2003	Rockity Roll	−	self-released	EP
2004	Skittish / Rockity Roll	−	ATO Records, Snack Bar	Two disc re-release
2005	Haughty Melodic	175	ATO Records	Doughty's first full-band album. Longtime friend Dave Matthews heard early demos and signed Doughty to his label.
2005	The Gambler	−	ATO Records	EP with several live songs as well as covers, including the titular Kenny Rogers hit. Released only on the iTunes Music Store.
2008	Golden Delicious	87	ATO Records	
2008	Busking	−	ATO Records	Limited edition Live LP sold only at shows. Contains 12 tracks from a 2007 busking performance in the 14th Street – Union Square station in New York City.
2008	Busking EP	−	ATO Records	An EP, featuring five tracks from the Busking LP, released as a free add-on to Golden Delicious in Borders book stores.
2009	Sad Man Happy Man	138	ATO Records	
2011	Dubious Luxury	−	−	An electro/sampled/sonic-slice-and-dice album put out as an appetizer to the singer/songwriter album, Yes and Also Yes.
2011	Yes and Also Yes	177	Snack Bar	
2012	The Question Jar Show	−	Snack Bar	A two disc album compiling the best recordings of his Question Jar tour.
2012	The Lo-Fi Lodge	−	Snack Bar	A subscription-based album consisting of acoustic versions of previously released songs as well as demos, outtakes, alternate takes and other rarities. 32 tracks in total, released once a week beginning in the spring of 2012.
2012	The Flip Is Another Honey	−	Snack Bar	An album consisting of cover songs originally recorded by various artists such as Cheap Trick and John Denver intermingled with original material from Doughty.
2013	Circles, Super Bon Bon, and The Very Best of Soul Coughing	65	MRI	A crowd-funded album of Soul Coughing songs rerecorded as Doughty originally intended them prior to being altered for recording by Soul Coughing. As expressed in The Book of Drugs, he feels animosity toward the Soul Coughing versions. Fans had a mixed reaction to this, the more Doughty-inclined Soul Coughing fans supported the idea (racking up 100% on PledgeMusic, a crowdfunding platform, in a little over a few hours).
2013	Water and Washington	−	self−released	A rare bonus album available to participants in his PledgeMusic campaign for Circles, Super Bon Bon, and The Very Best of Soul Coughing. The album, available as a download to pledgers who ordered a copy, consisted of 20 acoustic tracks, including acoustic versions of the Soul Coughing songs on the album, as well as several tracks that were not included on the album.
2014	Live at Ken's House	130	MRI	Doughty's third official live album. It is a compilation of the best cuts of his October/November US tour in support of Circles, Super Bon Bon, and The Very Best of Soul Coughing. The material is solely live performances of this album.
2015	Stellar Motel	66	Snack Bar	PledgeMusic
2016	The Heart Watches While the Brain Burns	-	Snack Bar	

== With Ghost of Vroom ==
In collaboration with Andrew "Scrap" Livingston.

Year	Album	Chart peaks	Label	Notes
Year	Album	US	Label	Notes
2020	Ghost of Vroom 2 EP	−	mod y vi Records	First release for project with Doughty and Andrew "Scrap" Livingston. Produced by Mario Caldato Jr.
2021	Ghost of Vroom 1	−	mod y vi Records	The first full album for the band, recorded prior to Ghost of Vroom 2 but release delayed until COVID-19 related restrictions on touring were lifted. Produced by Mario Caldato Jr.
2023	Ghost of Vroom 3	−	mod y vi Records	Released September 2023. Produced by Mario Caldato Jr.

== Music videos ==
- "Looking at the World from the Bottom of a Well"
- "27 Jennifers"
- "Fort Hood"
- "Put It Down"
- "(You Should Be) Doubly (Gratified)"
- "(I Keep On) Rising Up"
- "Na Na Nothing"
- "Take Me Home, Country Roads"
- "Sunshine"
- "Super Bon Bon (Re-Imagined)"
- "The Idiot Kings (Re-Imagined)"
- "[Light Will Keep Your Heart Beating In The Future"
- "Oh My God Yeah Fuck It"
- "I Can't Believe I Found You in That Town"
- "Sad Girl Walking in the Rain"
- "Wait! You'll Find a Better Way"

== Written work ==
- Slanky: Poems and Songs (2012, ISBN 1-59376-504-5)
- The Book of Drugs (2012, ISBN 0-30681-877-9)
- I Die Each Time I Hear the Sound: A Memoir (2020, ISBN 0-30682-531-7)
