= Songs in the Key of X: Music from and Inspired by the X-Files =

Soundtrack album by various artists
- Released: March 19, 1996
- Recorded: Various
- Genres: Electronic; rock
- Length: 72:55
- Label: Warner Bros.
- Producer: David Was

Songs in the Key of X: Music from and Inspired by the X-Files is a 1996 compilation album released in association with the American science fiction television series The X-Files. The album contained a mixture of songs that were either featured in the series, or shared thematic elements with it. Songs in the Key of X peaked at No. 47 on the Billboard 200 album sales chart after its release. The album's title is a play on the title of Stevie Wonder's 1976 album Songs in the Key of Life.

The album has received positive reviews from critics, with one review describing it as "easily the most ambitious record ever assembled for a TV soundtrack". The song "Hands of Death (Burn Baby Burn)" received a nomination for the Grammy Award for Best Metal Performance in 1997, losing to Rage Against the Machine. The album also features two songs hidden in the pregap before the start of the first track, both recorded by Nick Cave and The Dirty Three.

== Production ==
When plans for the album were proposed, executives at both Fox Broadcasting Company—the network responsible for the series—and Warner Bros. Records compiled a list of possible inclusions, most of which were eventually rejected. Artists such as Tom Petty, Bruce Springsteen and Seal were approached to contribute material. Although all three were admitted fans of the series, none were able to get involved in the project—Petty was unable to commit due to a tour, Springsteen was contractually tied to Sony Music Entertainment, and Seal was "snowboarding in South America or somewhere".

Elvis Costello and Brian Eno's track, "My Dark Life", came about as a result of album producer David Was asking Costello to provide a song that would sound like "you went into the studio with Brian Eno"—the two musicians had recently met at a film screening at Paul McCartney's home, and reconvened to record the song the following week. R.E.M. and author William S. Burroughs collaborated on a new version of "Star Me Kitten", a song that had originally appeared on the band's 1992 album Automatic for the People. Rob Zombie has described his collaboration with Alice Cooper on the song "Hands of Death (Burn Baby Burn)" as one of the "great moments where you really feel like you've made your dreams come true". Zombie and Cooper were nominated for the Grammy Award for Best Metal Performance in 1997 for the song, losing out to Rage Against the Machine's "Tire Me".

Several of the songs on the album were used in episodes of the series. Soul Coughing's "Unmarked Helicopters" appeared in the fourth-season episode "Max", Nick Cave's "Red Right Hand" was heard during the second-season episode "Ascension", Screamin' Jay Hawkins' "Frenzy" appeared in the second-season episode "Humbug", Danzig's "Deep" was featured in the third-season episode "Syzygy", and the Rob Zombie and Alice Cooper song "Hands of Death (Burn Baby Burn)" was featured in the fourth-season episode "Small Potatoes". Three of the artists featured on the album went on to contribute songs to The X-Files: The Album, the soundtrack to the series' 1998 feature film adaptation—Foo Fighters' "Walking After You", Soul Coughing's "16 Horses" and Filter's "One".

== Release and reception ==
Professional ratings
Review scores
Source	Rating
AllMusic	3/5 stars
Entertainment Weekly	B
Los Angeles Times	3.5/4 stars
Daily Herald	3/5 stars
The Buffalo News	4/5 stars
Los Angeles Daily News	3/5 stars

Songs in the Key of X was released on March 19, 1996. It reached a peak chart position of 47 in the Billboard 200 album chart on April 13 that same year, spending ten weeks in the chart. The album also spent five weeks in the Swedish Sverigetopplistan charts, peaking at number 42, and six weeks in the Finland's Official List chart, peaking at number 24.

Reviews for Songs in the Key of X were generally positive. Upon the album's release, Entertainment Weekly's David Browne rated it a B, calling it "easily the most ambitious record ever assembled for a TV soundtrack". Browne felt that the contributions to the album by Sheryl Crow and William S. Burroughs were amongst its highlights, though felt that the compilation was "dragged down by ponderous contributions" from Nick Cave and Elvis Costello. AllMusic's Steven McDonald was mostly positive towards the album, rating it three stars out of five and stating that "while not perfect, the album makes a nice alternative compilation", noting that it shares the television series' "blue-light glow of twisted mystery". McDonald felt that the Foo Fighters cover of Gary Numan's "Down in the Park" and Elvis Costello's "My Dark Life", along with Mark Snow's theme for the series, were the highlights of the compilation. Sandy Masuo, writing for the Los Angeles Times, rated the album three-and-a-half stars out of four, finding that the compilation's "unsettling ambience" suited the "deliciously creepy" atmosphere of the series. Masuo felt that the R.E.M./Burroughs and Costello/Eno collaborations ultimately turned out to be "more interesting in theory than in practice", naming "Down in the Park" as the best track on the compilation, with the contributions of Rob Zombie, Alice Cooper and P.M. Dawn also noted as highlights.

A review for the album in The Independent noted that none of the songs "can really hold a candle to Cave's 'Red Right Hand' in capturing the show's sense of fatalistic futility", adding that there seemed to be "a shared soul thing" between Cave and Carter. Ted Cox, writing for the Daily Herald, described the album as "a who's who of modern rock". Cox rated the album three stars out of five, noting that "most of the material hits the fair-to-middling quality level of a neglected album cut or a good B-side", adding, however, that the album's overall "atmosphere of paranoia and alienation" helped to tie it together. Writing for The Buffalo News, Anthony Violanti rated the album four stars out of five, calling it "a strange, delightful trip". Violanti felt that "Star Me Kitten" was the album's best song, and that Danzig's "Deep" was its "weakest cut". Writing for the Los Angeles Daily News, Fred Shuster felt that compared to other television tie-ins that "aren't worth the aluminum they're recorded on", Songs in the Key of X "is a rare exception because of the unusual quality and rarity of the tracks". Shuster rated the album three stars out of five, describing it as "more imaginative than the show that inspired it".

== Track listing ==
No.	Title	Writer(s)	Artist	Length
0.	"Time Jesum Transeuntum Et Non Riverentum" (Note: This is presumably meant to render the lyric "Dread the passage of Jesus, for he will not return." The Latin has several errors, however; Time Jesum transeuntem et non reventurum would be more accurate.)/ "X-Files Theme" (includes pregap hidden tracks (Note: Producers used the Compact Disc's pregap, so a listener has to rewind the first track a full nine minutes to hear two additional hidden tracks, "Time Jesum Transeuntum Et Non Riverentum" and a cover of The X-Files theme song, both performed by Nick Cave and Dirty Three. This is hinted at in the album's liner booklet, which notes "Nick Cave and the Dirty Three would like you to know that '0' is also a number". The use of these hidden tracks has been described as "just the sort of surprise one might have suspected from a show that deals in unexplainable mysteries". Not all CD or DVD players will allow the album to be "rewound" back to these tracks as this violates Red Book standards.))	Nick Cave/Mark Snow	Nick Cave & The Dirty Three/ The Dirty Three	10:18
1.	"X-Files Theme (Main Title)"	Mark Snow	Mark Snow	3:24
2.	"Unmarked Helicopters"	Soul Coughing	Soul Coughing	3:22
3.	"On the Outside"	Sheryl Crow, Jeff Trott	Sheryl Crow	4:36
4.	"Down in the Park"	Gary Numan	Foo Fighters	4:04
5.	"Star Me Kitten"	Bill Berry, Peter Buck, Mike Mills, Michael Stipe	William S. Burroughs & R.E.M.	3:30
6.	"Red Right Hand"	Nick Cave, Mick Harvey, Thomas Wydler	Nick Cave and the Bad Seeds	6:11
7.	"Thanks Bro"	Richard Patrick, Brian Liesegang, Matt Walker, Geno Lenardo, Frank Cavanagh	Filter	4:10
8.	"Man of Steel"	Frank Black	Frank Black	4:59
9.	"Unexplained"	Curt Kirkwood	Meat Puppets	3:44
10.	"Deep"	Glenn Danzig	Danzig	3:50
11.	"Frenzy"	David Hess, Augustus Stevenson	Screamin' Jay Hawkins	2:10
12.	"My Dark Life"	Elvis Costello	Elvis Costello with Brian Eno	6:20
13.	"Hands of Death (Burn Baby Burn)"	Charlie Clouser, Rob Zombie, Alice Cooper	Rob Zombie and Alice Cooper	4:12
14.	"If You Never Say Goodbye"	Chris Carter, Attrell Cordes, David Was	P.M. Dawn	4:06
15.	"The X-Files Theme" (P.M. Dawn remix)	Snow	P.M. Dawn	3:59
Total length:				72:55

== Charts ==
=== Weekly charts ===
Chart (1996)	Peak position
Australian Albums (ARIA)	8
Hungarian Albums (MAHASZ)	7

=== Year-end charts ===
Chart (1996)	Position
Australian Albums (ARIA)	48

=== Certifications ===
Region	Certification	Certified units/sales
Australia (ARIA)	Platinum	70,000^{^}
^{^} Shipments figures based on certification alone.
