= Mark Degli Antoni =

- Labels: Warner Bros., Slash, Tzadik
- Member of: Soul Coughing

Mark degli Antoni (sometimes credited as Mark De Gli Antoni) is an American composer, known for his work as co-founder and keyboard sampler for the band Soul Coughing from 1992 to 2000.

He studied music composition at the Mannes School of Music in New York City.

Since leaving Soul Coughing, he has devoted much of his energy toward film scoring. Film scores include Cherish, Marie and Bruce, the HBO documentary Roman Polanski: Wanted and Desired, Into the Abyss directed by Werner Herzog, Crown Heights directed by Matt Ruskin, and the Netflix documentary Get Me Roger Stone.

Antoni collaborated with his former Soul Coughing bandmate Sebastian Steinberg as part of the backing band on Miho Hatori's 2005 album Ecdysis. He has toured with Low, John Scofield, and David Byrne on the Songs of David Byrne and Brian Eno Tour.

In 2024, Antoni rejoined Soul Coughing for a reunion tour, including an appearance on Jimmy Kimmel Live!.
