= Sebastian Steinberg =

American musician (born 1960)

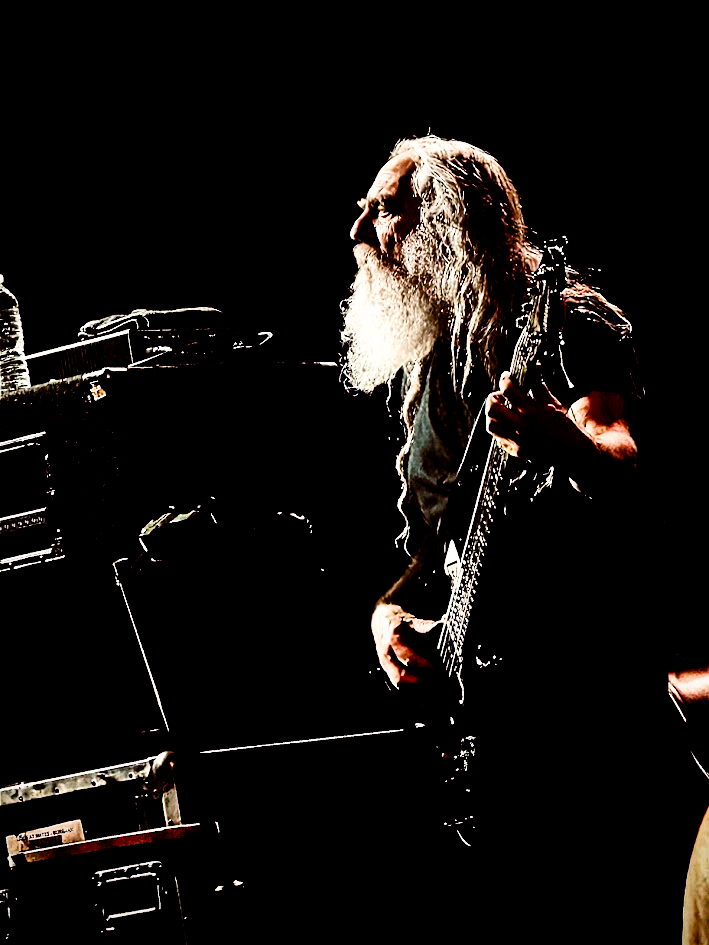
Sebastian Steinberg of Soul Coughing performing in New York in 2024

Sebastian Steinberg (born February 20, 1960) is an American bass player, best known for his work in the band Soul Coughing

== Biography ==
Steinberg played with Soul Coughing throughout the band's entire history, from 1992 to 2000. In 2001, Steinberg performed on stage with Neil Finn and Tim Finn, Eddie Vedder, Johnny Marr, Ed O'Brien, Phil Selway and others in a series of concerts recorded on a DVD titled "7 Worlds Collide". He also recorded and performed with guitarist Marc Ribot and appeared on William Shatner's 2004 album Has Been.

Steinberg was also a member of the Latin-fusion band Yerba Buena, playing bass in its live lineup. The group released its debut album, President Alien, in 2003, followed by its second album, Island Life, in 2005.

Steinberg performed on the Dixie Chicks' 2006 Accidents and Accusations tour, and toured with k.d. lang during the summer of 2007. Steinberg performed with Vanessa Carlton on The Tonight Show with Jay Leno October 11, 2007. In 2009, he appeared again with Neil Finn and friends for the second installment of 7 Worlds Collide playing alongside members of Radiohead and Wilco. Steinberg made a brief appearance in the 2009 film Funny People, as the bassist in a band that Adam Sandler's character, a movie star, hired to jam with him. In 2009, Steinberg also played bass on Marshall Crenshaw's album Jaggedland.

Steinberg works as a session musician, playing electric bass and double bass on numerous albums. He contributed the bass tracks to the 2003 track 'Frosty the Snowman' and the 2012 Fiona Apple album, The Idler Wheel..., and he toured with Fiona Apple as part of her backing band in 2012. In 2014, Steinberg also played bass supporting guitar virtuoso and producer Blake Mills, a tour where Fiona Apple made sporadic appearances, to promote Mills' second full-length album, Heigh Ho. Steinberg has also been a regular performer with the Watkins Family Hour, and the band released their debut album in July 2015. Steinberg has also worked with singer songwriter J.S. Ondara and has toured as a bassist for Iron & Wine.

In 2020, Steinberg performed on and co-produced Fiona Apple's album Fetch the Bolt Cutters. In an interview with SPIN, he discussed his role in the album's production. In a 2022 interview on The Bass Shed Podcast, he described working on the album as "one of the most natural and wonderful things [he] ever worked on."

In 2024, Steinberg toured with Diana Krall and Matt Chamberlain.

In 2024 and 2025, Steinberg rejoined Soul Coughing for a reunion tour, including an appearance on Jimmy Kimmel Live!.

In November 2026, Steinberg is scheduled to perform with Diana Krall and drummer Matt Chamberlain at Taipei Music Center in Taipei, Taiwan part of a tour of Asia.

== Personal life ==
Steinberg was born in New York City and grew up in Newton, Massachusetts, son (with brother Adam) of musicologist Michael Steinberg and fabric artist Jane Steinberg.
