= Soul Coughing =

American alternative rock band

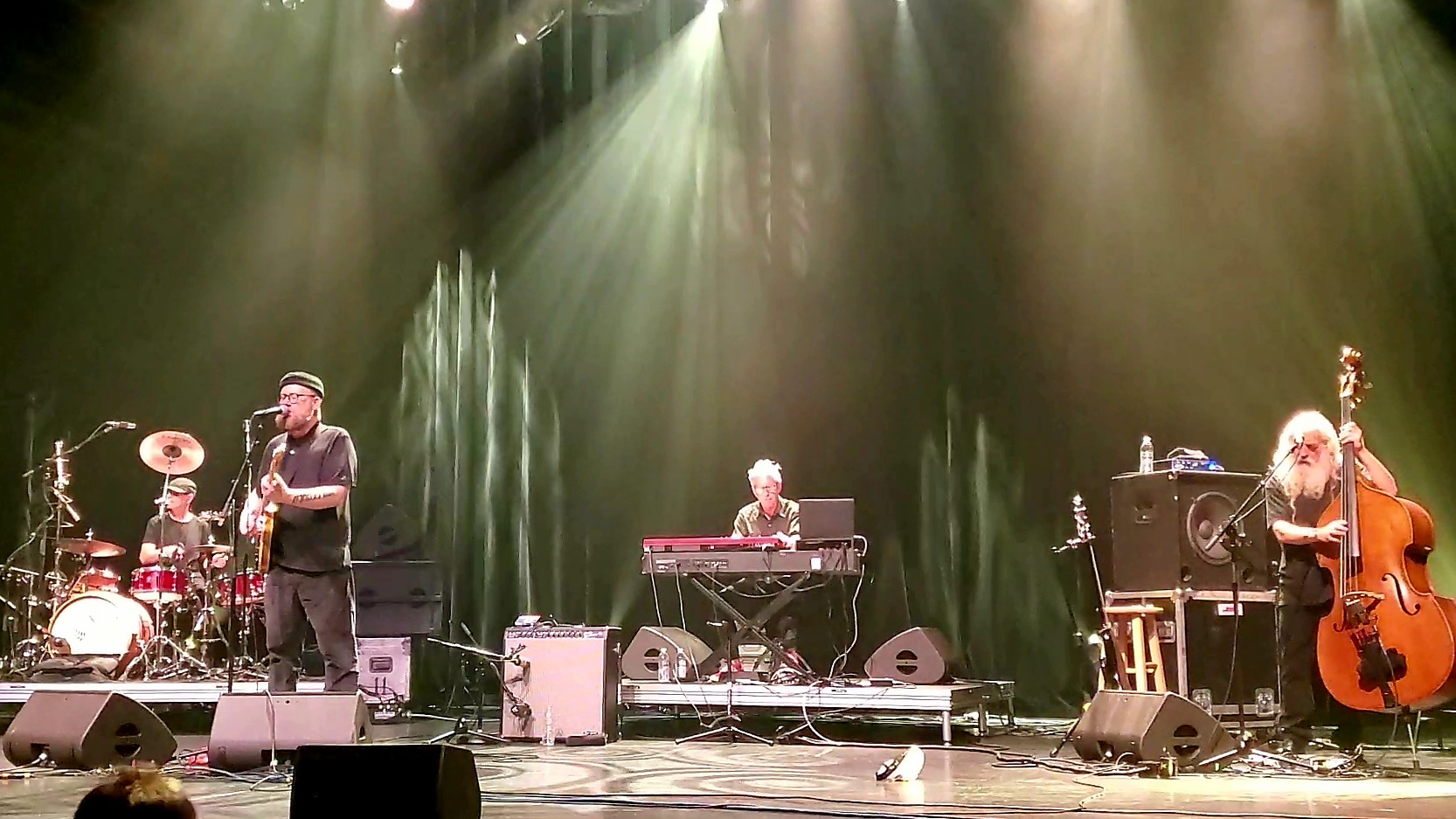
- Soul Coughing on tour in 2024

Background information
- Origin: New York City, New York, United States
- Genres: Alternative hip-hop; alternative rock; electronic
- Years active: 1992–2000; 2024–present
- Labels: Slash; Warner Bros.
- Members: Mike Doughty; Mark Degli Antoni; Sebastian Steinberg; Yuval Gabay

Soul Coughing is an American alternative rock band composed of vocalist/guitarist Mike Doughty (also known as M. Doughty), keyboardist/sampler Mark Degli Antoni, bassist Sebastian Steinberg, and drummer Yuval Gabay. They garnered largely positive response from critics. Steve Huey of AllMusic described the band as "One of the most unique cult bands of the '90s. Driven by frontman M. Doughty's stream-of-consciousness poetry, Soul Coughing's sound was a willfully idiosyncratic mix of improvisational jazz grooves, oddball samples, hip-hop, electronics, and noisy experimentalism". Doughty described the band's sound as "deep slacker jazz". The group broke up in 2000.

In June 2024, the group announced they would reunite for a United States tour in September and October of the same year. They made their first television appearance in decades on Jimmy Kimmel Live!.

== History ==
All four Soul Coughing members were regulars at The Knitting Factory, a New York City nightclub and performance venue that was part of the 1980s and 1990s experimental downtown scene. Doughty was a doorman known for his improvised comedic quasi-raps, while the others appeared at the Knitting Factory in various bands. Doughty, Degli Antoni, and Steinberg all performed in versions of John Zorn's composition Cobra, appearing on John Zorn's Cobra: Live at the Knitting Factory (recorded 1992, released 1995). The four-piece performed for the first time as "M. Doughty's Soul Coughing" on June 15, 1992 at the Knitting Factory.

Within a year of their formation, the band was signed to Slash Records, a subsidiary of Warner Bros. Records. The group released three albums: Ruby Vroom (1994), Irresistible Bliss (1996) and El Oso (1998), with the latter showing a marked drum and bass influence. Irresistible Bliss and El Oso both reached the Billboard 200 albums chart. The band enjoyed minor hit singles with "Soundtrack to Mary" and "Super Bon Bon".

In 1996, Soul Coughing contributed to the AIDS benefit album Offbeat: A Red Hot Soundtrip, produced by the Red Hot Organization. The same year they released an EP on the subscription-only label Hello CD of the Month Club. Also in 1996, one of the group's songs, "Unmarked Helicopters", was included in the Songs in the Key of X: Music from and Inspired by the X-Files. The band also placed songs in the soundtracks to the films Batman & Robin ("The Bug"), Tommy Boy ("Is Chicago, Is Not Chicago") and Spawn ("A Plane Scraped Its Belly On A Sooty Yellow Moon", featuring Roni Size). Their song "Super Bon Bon" was included on the soundtrack for the video game Gran Turismo 2 in 1999.

Soul Coughing publicity photo, 1998

The 1998 song "Circles" from El Oso reached No. 8 on the Billboard Alternative Songs chart, and was used as the soundtrack to a Cartoon Network extended commercial that poked fun at repeating cartoon backgrounds.

Soul Coughing broke up in 2000. Mark Degli Antoni moved on to a career as a film score composer, while Mike Doughty began a prolific solo career, occasionally revisiting Soul Coughing songs in new styles.

Lust in Phaze, a greatest hits compilation including a few B-sides, was released in 2002. Rhino Records reissued Soul Coughing's three studio albums on 180-gram black vinyl in 2015, marking the first time Ruby Vroom had been pressed to vinyl. In 2017, Swedish record label Woah Dad! acquired Soul Coughing's back catalog from Slash Records.

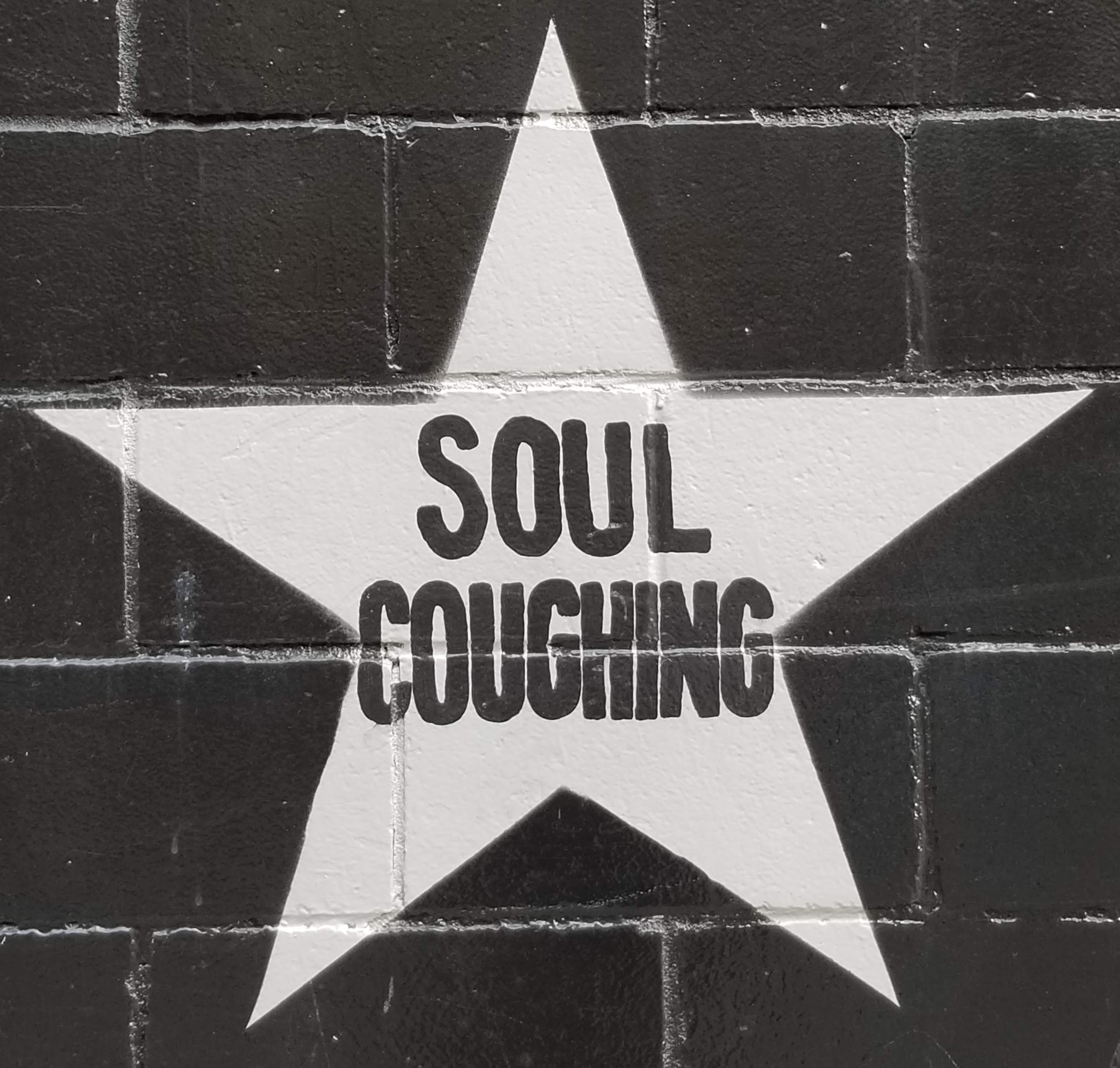
Star honoring Soul Coughing on the outside mural of the Minneapolis nightclub First Avenue

Soul Coughing was honored with a star on the outside mural of Minneapolis nightclub First Avenue, which recognizes performers who have played sold-out shows or otherwise made major cultural contributions to the iconic venue. Receiving a star "might be the most prestigious public honor an artist can receive in Minneapolis", according to journalist Steve Marsh. Soul Coughing was especially popular in Minneapolis, thanks to airplay on alternative radio station Rev 105, and regularly performed there to audiences five to ten times larger than in other cities.

In February 2022, Doughty and Steinberg performed together in Los Angeles during Steinberg's set for Watkins Family Hour. The duo performed Soul Coughing songs "Super Bon Bon" and "True Dreams of Wichita", which marked the first occasion members of Soul Coughing appeared on stage together since the split in 2000.

At the end of June 2024, Soul Coughing reformed with all the original members and announced that there would be a short tour with limited shows throughout September and October 2024. On September 12th, in celebration of the 30th anniversary of Ruby Vroom, the band performed "Super Bon Bon" live on Jimmy Kimmel Live.

== Discography ==
=== Albums ===
Overview of studio albums by Soul Coughing
Title	Release date	Label	Formats	Peak chart positions	
Title	Release date	Label	Formats	US	CAN
Ruby Vroom	September 27, 1994	Slash/Warner Bros.	CD, CS, LP	—	—
Irresistible Bliss	July 9, 1996	Slash/Warner Bros.	CD, CS, LP	136	—
El Oso	September 29, 1998	Slash/Warner Bros.	CD, CS, LP	49	69
				"—" denotes a release that did not chart.	

=== Compilations ===
Overview of Soul Coughing compilation albums
Title	Details
Lust in Phaze	Released: March 19, 2002; Label: Slash/Rhino; Format: CD

=== Live albums ===
Overview of Soul Coughing live albums
Title	Release date	Label	Recorded
Tokyo, Japan 03.02.97	2004	Kufala Recordings	February 2–3, 1997
New York, NY 16.08.99	January 4, 2005	Kufala Recordings	August 16, 1999
Berlin/Amsterdam 1997	January 4, 2005	Kufala Recordings	1997
Rennes, France 03.12.94	January 4, 2005	Kufala Recordings	December 3, 1994
LIVE 2024	April 4, 2025	SC24 Inc. / Not On Label (Soul Coughing Self-released)	2024

=== Singles ===
Overview of Soul Coughing singles
Year	Title	Peak chart positions			Album
Year	Title	US Alt.	US Main.	US Bub.	Album
1994	"Down to This"	—	—	—	Ruby Vroom
1995	"Sugar Free Jazz"	—	—	—	Ruby Vroom
1995	"Screenwriter's Blues"	—	—	—	Ruby Vroom
1996	"Soundtrack to Mary"	37	—	—	Irresistible Bliss
1996	"Super Bon Bon"	27	—	—	Irresistible Bliss
1997	"Soft Serve"	—	—	—	Irresistible Bliss
1998	"Circles"	8	38	24	El Oso
1998	"St. Louise Is Listening"	—	—	—	El Oso
1999	"Rolling"	—	—	—	El Oso
"—" denotes a release that did not chart.

=== Music videos ===
Year	Album	Title	Director
1995	Ruby Vroom	Down to This	Mark Kohr
1995	Ruby Vroom	Screenwriter's Blues	Jim McKay
1996	Irresistible Bliss	Soundtrack to Mary	John Flansburgh Norwood Cheek
1996	Irresistible Bliss	Super Bon Bon	Jamie Caliri
1998	El Oso	Circles	Chris Applebaum
