= The Best of Spineshank =

Compilation album by Spineshank
- Released: January 29, 2008
- Genres: Nu metal, industrial metal
- Length: 40:31
- Label: Roadrunner
- Producers: Mike Sarkisyan, Tommy Decker

Spineshank chronology
Self-Destructive Pattern (2003)	The Best of Spineshank (2008)	Anger Denial Acceptance (2012)

The Best of Spineshank is a greatest hits compilation album, released by the American industrial metal band Spineshank's former record label Roadrunner Records. It was released on January 29, 2008, and features material from the band's first 3 studio albums presented in reverse chronological order. The album has sold over 10,000 copies as of March 11, 2008.

== Track listing ==
1. "Violent Mood Swings" - 3:29
2. "Smothered" - 3:07
3. "Stillborn" - 4:15
4. "Dead to Me" - 3:34
5. "Asthmatic" - 3:30
6. "The Height of Callousness" - 3:04
7. "New Disease" - 3:14
8. "Synthetic" - 3:09
9. "Cyanide 2600" - 3:10
10. "Detached" - 3:21
11. "Where We Fall" - 3:30
12. "Shinebox" - 3:07
- Tracks 10–12 are from the album Strictly Diesel (1998)
- Tracks 5–9 are from the album The Height of Callousness (2000)
- Tracks 1–4 are from the album Self-Destructive Pattern (2003)

== Personnel ==
=== Musicians ===
- Jonny Santos – lead vocals
- Mike Sarkisyan – guitars
- Robert Garcia – bass, backing vocals
- Tommy Decker – drums, programming

=== Credits ===
- GGGarth – production
- Mike Sarkisyan – co-production
- Ted Jensen – mastering
- Frank Gryner – engineering, recording, additional programming
- Scott Humphrey – engineering, recording, additional programming
- Jay Baumgardner – mixing
- Mark Kiczula – assistant mixer
- Ben "Game Over" Kaplan – digital editing
- Jeff Rothschild – assistant digital editor
- Anthony "Fu" Valcic – assistant digital editor
- Brad Kane – additional vocals
