= Roadrage 2003 =

Road Rage 2003

Compilation album by various artists
- Released: September 1, 2003
- Language: English
- Producer: Roadrunner

Roadrage 2003 is a compilation DVD featuring various artist with Roadrunner Records.

== Track listing ==
1. My Plague (New Abuse Mix – Director's Cut) – Slipknot
2. Back to the Primitive (Uncensored version) – Soulfly
3. Fixation on the Darkness – Killswitch Engage
4. Unreal – Ill Niño
5. God Save Us – Ill Niño
6. Loco – Coal Chamber
7. Smothered – Spineshank
8. Synthetic – Spineshank
9. Resurrection – Fear Factory
10. The Blood, the Sweat, the Tears (live) – Machine Head
11. Roots Bloody Roots – Sepultura
12. Down Again – Chimaira
13. Sp Lit – Chimaira
14. I Don't Wanna Be Me – Type O Negative
15. Inhale – Stone Sour
16. White Wedding – Murderdolls
17. Tabula Rasa – Sinch
18. Nothing Could Come Between Us – Theory of a Deadman
19. Too Bad – Nickelback
20. Kry – Life of Agony
21. Medicated – Downthesun
22. Scream! – Misfits
