= Thepublicrecord.com =

Thepublicrecord.com (TPR) is the brainchild of producer Scott Humphrey that went live on October 5, 2009, with Tommy Lee's interactive project album titled A Public Disservice Announcement. Initially based out of The Atrium; Tommy Lee's home studio in Calabasas, California, it is now hosted from Hollywood, CA. It is an interactive website where fans, musicians or anyone who has an audio or visual concept and the means to record to digital format can come to participate with like minded artists/musicians. Users then can interact amongst themselves or with major artists who offer up their creative works in the form of stems; the industries term for components of a mix/song such as a drum part, a guitar part, a bass part, etc.

Members download the raw tracks (stems), plug it into their DAW or capable mobile app and record their parts. They then submit parts by uploading them onto the public record (TPR) servers in mp3 format @ 128kps utilizing one featured mixed track and the component solo formats.

TPR touts itself as being the first large scale truly interactive website where the public can interact with artists via audio/visual formats and vice versa - serving as a host and bridge to both. Some of the most prominent names in the business frequent the site observing submissions and searching for talent.

TPR is a work in progress and the site goes through continual development, upgrades and changes often addressing the concerns of its members and artists alike. 1.0 was open to anyone who came onto the site, had the means to record to a digital format and an internet connection. In TPR 2.0, individual member profile pages were brought into existence on the site. Signing up is free, and at present so is participation. Each submission that a member wishes to have considered requires them to electronically sign an agreement which covers copyrights and employment since each participant is considered an employee for hire with the possibility of being asked to do more in promoting the site as well as themselves. In most cases, participation is considered for charitable causes. However, there have been instances where a member is contacted and offered more, such as a percentage of copyright in a recording contract for their submission(s) or artistic contribution(s).

This was the case in the first featured release from A Public Disservice Announcement; The Fight Song, when TPR member Marcus Davis from AZ was asked to sign a contract for his vocal and lyric contributions on the verses, the outro vocal and one chorus. The contract is said to have shared one quarter copyright credit with the other contributors; those included Tommy Lee, Chad Kroger, and Clint Lowery.

Members are also often asked of their opinions towards determinations on how the site is to be molded and used. Members that sign up can produce visual interpretations or feature performances of themselves performing their musical interpretations or remixes by uploading in a variety of audio/video formats (mp3 mpeg, avi, divx, mp4, flv, wmv, rm, mov, moov, asf) hosting to either YouTube.com/ or the publicrecord.com servers. Users are then able to promote their interpretations or works on their member profile page as well as on other sections within the site.

The site is broken down into many facets of featured content including a member created forum area where volunteers are moderators. Each major artist is featured with their own section on the website which incorporates tools and instructions for interacting on projects.

In February 2011, an addition to the site called TPR Beats was made featuring free downloads of mixed drum stems at varied BPM that serve as a basis for creating original member works with the aspiration of generating interest from publishing companies for possible licensing opportunities and profit in the areas of TV, movies, trailers, commercials, video games or web media. Submissions being uploaded in this section are covered under the CC, Creative Commons licenses.

Sponsors also have a News & Review stream featuring content of the latest of product related news within the industry.

The Public Record is a Can-Spam compliant site as mandated by the Federal Trade Commission.

Frank Gryner announced the staffs decision to close TPR indefinitely on 4/1/12, citing technical and resource challenges.

== Previously Featured Artists ==
- Tommy Lee & Methods of Mayhem
- Deadmau5
- Shooter Jennings
- Autozamm
- Midnight Youth
- Dan Jacobs of Atreyu
- Rob Zombie
- John 5
- The Elements
- Steve Vai
- Steve Duda & BSOD
- 12th Planet
- Stever
- Street Drum Corps
- Filter
- Vampires Everywhere
- JT Allen
- Prashant Aswani
- The Elements
- Black Veil Brides
- Dave Lombardo (Slayer)
