= Road Rage =

Road Rage may refer to:

- Road rage, a driving phenomenon

== Music ==
- Road Rage (Great Big Sea album), 2000
- Road Rage (Quiet Riot album), 2017
- Road Rage (EP), by Area-7, 1997
- Roadrage 2003, a video compilation from Roadrunner Records
- "Road Rage" (song), by Catatonia, 1998
- "Road Rage", a song by Dizzee Rascal from Tongue n' Cheek, 2009
- "Road Rage", a song by Eminem from The Death of Slim Shady (Coup de Grâce), 2024
- "Road Rage", a song by Young Thug from Punk, 2021

== Other media ==
- Road Rage (film), a 1999 movie starring Yasmine Bleeth
- Road Rage (audiobook), a 2009 audiobook including short stories by Richard Matheson and Stephen King / Joe Hill
- Road Rage (novel), a 1997 novel by Ruth Rendell
- Road Rage (1995 video game), by Konami
- Road Rage (2017 video game), developed by Team6 Game Studios and published by Maximum Games
- The Simpsons: Road Rage, a 2001 video game
- Road Rage (Kinnikuman), a fictional character in the anime and manga Kinnikuman (Ultimate Muscle)
- "Road Rage" (The Thin Blue Line), a 1996 television episode

== See also ==
- AEW Road Rager, an annual professional wrestling special by All Elite Wrestling (AEW)
