= Frank Gryner =

- Origin: Canada
- Genres: Rock, industrial, electronic
- Occupations: Record producer, engineer
- Years active: 1993 – present
- Labels: Interscope, Geffen Records
- Website: www.frankgryner.com

Frank Gryner is a Canadian record producer, mix engineer, audio technician, and multi-instrumentalist. He has mixed/engineered or performed on recordings for multiplatinum artist Rob Zombie, as well as A Perfect Circle, BT, Peter Pepper, and Andrew W.K. among many others.

== Biography ==
Gryner grew up in Forest, Lambton County, Ontario. He is half Irish and half Filipino. He began as a Rock guitarist and picked up his knowledge of producing from the studios where his band recorded demos.

Gryner has worked with a wide spectrum of artists including Tommy Lee, John 5, and his own sister Emm Gryner. He has coordinated with producer Scott Humphrey on many projects including the works done in the Chop Shop such as Hellbilly Deluxe by Rob Zombie.

In 2014, Gryner joined his sister Emm Gryner's side project, Trapper, with Sean Kelly (on guitar), Emm (on vocals), Jordan Kern (on bass) and Tim Timleck (ex-Universal Honey on drums), playing "1980s-style melodic hard rock." In May 2015, Trapper opened for Brit-rockers Def Leppard on 3 Canadian tour dates in Montréal, Ottawa and London, Ontario. Emm Gryner had met and become friends with Def Leppard lead singer Joe Elliot when she toured as a backing singer with David Bowie.

On May 29, 2015, Trapper played the Great Hall in Toronto with special guest Chris Hadfield singing two songs with the band.

On May 11, 2016, Frank Gryner directed a video for Def Leppard, for the song "Man Enough," filmed in Little Rock, Arkansas.

He also writes articles relative to the music industry which are featured in periodicals and online sites such as Premier Guitar, and Recording.

Gryner currently produces recordings out of his own God Complex production studio in Ontario.

== Software ==
Gryner is Vice President of Operations for the recording app called Jammit, a company he runs with CEO Scott Humphrey and others. Jammit is an iPhone application that utilizes the master recordings from various artists in the music industry. Featured artists include Alice Cooper, Foreigner, No Doubt, Nickelback, Sum 41, Godsmack and many more. Jammit is available for iOS devices and Mac OS X. The app has won multiple industry awards.

Gryner co-created the thepublicrecord.com, which sourced the general public for track contributions to produce one of the largest scale collaboration albums ever produced, Tommy Lee's Methods of Mayhem album, A Public Disservice Announcement. Over the lifetime of the site contributing artists included Deadmau5, Rob Zombie, John 5, Steve Vai, and Black Veil Brides among many others.

On April 1, 2012, Gryner announced the staff's decision to close TPR indefinitely, citing technical and resource challenges.

== Discography ==
=== Albums ===
- L7 - "Hungry for Stink" (1994) Recording engineer
- Skold - "Skold" (1996) Engineer
- Powerman 5000 - Tonight the Stars Revolt! (1997) Mixing
- Rob Zombie - Hellbilly Deluxe (1998) Mixing, Engineer
- Methods of Mayhem - Methods of Mayhem (1999) Mixing
- Rob Zombie - American Made Music to Strip By (1999) Engineer
- A Perfect Circle - "Mer De Noms" (2000) Drum Engineer
- Rob Zombie - The Sinister Urge (2001) Engineer, Guitar
- Andrew W.K. - The Wolf (2003) Engineer
- Spineshank - Self-Destructive Pattern (2003) Engineer
- Rob Zombie - Past, Present & Future (2003) Engineer, Mixing
- Methods of Mayhem - A Public Disservice Announcement (2010) Engineer
- Peter Pepper - "Vs. The Great Whatever" (2012) Mixing, Engineer, Guitar
