= New Disease =

2001 song performed by Spineshank

Single by Spineshank

from the album The Height of Callousness and 3000 Miles To Graceland: Original Soundtrack
- Released: January 15, 2001
- Recorded: Mushroom Studios
- Genre: Nu metal; industrial metal
- Length: 3:14
- Label: Roadrunner
- Songwriter: Spineshank
- Producers: GGGarth; Tommy Decker; Mike Sarkisyan

Spineshank singles chronology
"Synthetic" (2000)	"New Disease" (2001)	"Smothered" (2003)

"New Disease" is a single by the American industrial metal band Spineshank. The song appears on the band's second album The Height of Callousness and was included on the soundtrack for the video game Shaun Palmer's Pro Snowboarder and MX Superfly. The song was also featured on the soundtrack of the film 3000 Miles to Graceland.

== Music video ==
The video includes the band in the room singing and playing, a man fixing a CCTV camera which the band are looking at and the lead singer talking to a girl who is sitting down alone. The video later reveals that a boy, the girl and the person fixing the camera are floating. After the second chorus, the clouds become darker and the man fixing the CCTV camera falls, the light in the room that the band is in fades, and everybody but the band start falling to the ground.

== Track listing ==
Enhanced CD single
No.	Title	Length
1.	"New Disease"	3:08
2.	"The Height of Callousness" (Fist Fuck Integrity Mix)	3:20
3.	"Asthmatic" (Punctured Lung Mix)	4:31
4.	"New Disease" (Music Video)	3:20

Promo single
No.	Title	Length
1.	"New Disease" (Album Version)	3:14
2.	"New Disease" (Radio Edit)	3:06

== Charts ==
Chart (2001)	Peak position
UK Singles (Official Charts)	84
UK Rock & Metal (OCC)	5
US Mainstream Rock (Billboard)	33
