= Anger Denial Acceptance =

Studio album by Spineshank
- Released: June 19, 2012
- Recorded: 2011–2012
- Studio: Cyanide Studios; Kingston Lane Studios; Mid City Sound; Optimum Sound; YMA Studios
- Genre: Metalcore; nu metal
- Length: 44:51
- Label: Century Media
- Producer: Mike Sarkisyan and Tommy Decker

Spineshank chronology
| Self-Destructive Pattern (2003) | Anger Denial Acceptance (2012) |

Anger Denial Acceptance is the fourth studio album by American metal band Spineshank. It was released on June 19, 2012, through Century Media Records. This album marked the return of Spineshank after a 9-year hiatus.

== Background ==
The first full-length release through Century Media, the album was announced in April 2012. It was produced by Mike Sarkisyan and Tommy Decker of the band, and mixed by Mike Plotnikoff.

Anger Denial Acceptance peaked at number 20 on the UK Rock & Metal Albums Chart in June 2012, where it remained for one week.

== Critical reception ==
Professional ratings
Review scores
| Source | Rating |
|---|---|
| AllMusic | 3.5/5 stars |
| Metal Forces | 8.5/10 |

AllMusic described the album as "pretty much packed with business as usual, latter-day ghosts of nu-metal past." Metal Forces rated the album 8.5 out of ten, stating, "Anger Denial Acceptance does whatever the hell it wants…repeatedly. It’s got 'sellout' anthems, the heaviest songs the band have ever recorded and an instrumental."

== Track listing ==
Anger Denial Acceptance
| No. | Title | Length |
|---|---|---|
| 1. | "After the End" | 3:06 |
| 2. | "Nothing Left for Me" | 3:37 |
| 3. | "Anger Denial Acceptance" (featuring Connor Garrity) | 5:29 |
| 4. | "I Want You to Know" | 3:47 |
| 5. | "Murder - Suicide" | 3:41 |
| 6. | "The Endless Disconnect" | 3:18 |
| 7. | "I Am Damage" | 2:46 |
| 8. | "Ploratio Morbus (Instrumental)" | 2:25 |
| 9. | "Everything Everyone Everywhere Ends" | 4:41 |
| 10. | "The Reckoning" | 3:49 |
| 11. | "God Complex (Anger)" | 1:51 |
| 12. | "Motive Method Opportunity (Denial)" | 1:38 |
| 13. | "Exit Wound (Acceptance)" | 4:39 |
| Total length: | | 44:51 |

== Personnel ==
Credits adapted from AllMusic.

=== Spineshank ===
- Tommy Decker, composer, drums, engineer, group member, mixing, producer, programming
- Johnny Santos, composer, group member, vocals
- Rob Garcia, bass, composer, group member, vocals
- Mike Sarkisyan, composer, engineer, group member, guitar, mixing, piano, producer, programming

=== Other contributors ===
- Amie Nicole, cover model
- Connor Garrity, spoken word
- Eric German, legal counsel
- Howie Weinberg, mastering
- Jeff Hannan, engineer, mixing
- Justin Walden, programming
- Kevin Estrada, photography
- Mike Plotnikoff, mixing
- Rob Kimura, design, layout
- Sharon Gilday, accounting
- Yuri Anisonyan, assistant engineer

== Charts ==
| Chart (2012) | Peak position |
|---|---|
| UK Rock & Metal Albums (OCC) | 20 |
