= A Public Disservice Announcement =

Studio album by Methods of Mayhem
- Released: September 21, 2010
- Recorded: March 2009 – 2010
- Genres: Alternative rock; rap rock; dance-rock
- Length: 43:06
- Labels: Roadrunner/Loud & Proud
- Producer: Scott Humphrey

Methods of Mayhem chronology
Methods of Mayhem (1999)	A Public Disservice Announcement (2010)

Singles from Methods of Mayhem
- 1. "Fight Song" Released: 2010; 2. "Time Bomb" Released: 2010

Professional ratings
Review scores
Source	Rating
AllMusic	3/5 stars

A Public Disservice Announcement is the second studio album by the band Methods of Mayhem, released on September 21, 2010. It is the band's only album since their self-titled debut album, which was released in 1999.

== Album information ==
The album, produced by Scott Humphrey, is unique in that it is composed partially of renditions and parts submitted by individuals from around the world based on the demos (stems) of each song that were posted online at thepublicrecord.com. Both the band and Humphrey listened to the recordings, which numbered over 10,000 – choosing the best and most fitting submission ideas to add to the song's final mix. In speaking about those who submitted their parts to the music, vocalist Tommy Lee said that:

There is a lot of undiscovered talent out there, from kids just getting started, to shirt tuckers who have a 9 to 5 that just rock out in a bar band on the weekends. They don't want to be famous, but those guys are stars.

"Fight Song" was released as the first single and a music video was released for the second single, "Time Bomb". The song has peaked at number 42 on the US Rock Songs Chart.

== Track listing ==
No.	Title	Length
1.	"Drunk Uncle Pete"	2:45
2.	"Time Bomb"	3:23
3.	"Louder"	4:38
4.	"Fight Song"	3:57
5.	"Blame"	3:28
6.	"2 Ways"	3:56
7.	"Talk Me Off the Ledge"	2:46
8.	"Only One"	3:53
9.	"All I Wanna Do"	4:07
10.	"Back to Before"	5:25
11.	"Party Instructions"	4:50
12.	"I Really Want You" (bonus track)	3:40
13.	"Let's Go" (bonus track)	5:12

== Personnel ==
Methods of Mayhem

- Tommy Lee – lead vocals, rhythm guitar, drums
- John "J3" Allen III – lead guitar, co-lead vocals
- Will Hunt – drums
- Scott Humphrey – synthesizer, piano, backing vocals
- DJ Aero – turntables

Additional musicians

- Phil X – guitar
- Chris Chaney- bass
- Deryck Whibley – guitar
- Chad Kroeger – backing vocals
- Skrillex – synthesizer
- Chino Moreno – vocals
- James Kottak – vocals
- deadmau5 – electronics
- Sofia Toufa – vocals
- Marcus Davis – vocals [From The Band PH8]
- Peter Černohorský – guitar
- John "Johnny Blackout" Hemphill - guitar
- Troy Castellano – additional guitars
- Steven McSwain – backing vocals
- Brett Morrow aka Max Watts – additional guitars
- Pierre Cramez (Cross) – backing vocals/additional guitars/electronics
- Amdukias – synthesizer
- Kevin Slack – additional guitars/synthesizers
- Josh "JT" Thompson – Additional Guitar
- Kai Korteila – Additional Guitar
- Joshua Walsh – Drums/Samples/Keyboards
- Duffy King - Additional Guitars
- Peter Gusmano - Guitars (All I Wanna Do)

=== Production ===
- Scott Humphrey – Composer, producer
- Ted Jensen- Mastering
- James Kottak – Composer
- Tommy Lee – Composer, producer
- Frank Gryner – Engineer
- Tommy Henriksen – Composer
- Corey Lowery – Composer
- Clint Lowery – Composer
- Troy McLawhorn – Composer
- Chad Kroeger – Composer
- Chris Baseford – Engineer
- Joel Zimmerman – Composer
- Marcus Davis – Composer
- Karen Stever – Digital editing
- Sofia Toufa – Composer
- Phil Xenidis – Composer
- Kai Huppunen – Composer
- John Edward Allen III – Composer
- Athena Kottak – Composer

== Charts ==
Chart	Position
Billboard	153
