= Get Naked =

Single by Methods of Mayhem featuring Fred Durst, Lil' Kim and George Clinton

from the album Methods of Mayhem
- Released: 1999
- Recorded: 1999
- Genre: Nu metal; rap metal; dirty rap
- Label: MCA
- Songwriters: Tommy Lee; George Clinton; Fred Durst; Kimberly D Jones; Tim Murray; Garry Shider; David Spradley

Methods of Mayhem singles chronology
"Get Naked" (1999)	"New Skin" (2000)

Lil' Kim singles chronology
"Money, Power & Respect" (1998)	"Get Naked" (1999)	"Notorious B.I.G." (1999)

"Get Naked" is a song by American musician Tommy Lee's first solo project Methods of Mayhem, from their album Methods of Mayhem. It features vocals by Fred Durst, Lil' Kim and George Clinton, with turntablism contributed by Beastie Boys associate Mix Master Mike.

The U.S. and Australian singles (released in CD and vinyl formats) contain the clean and album versions of the song, along with a b-side ("Narcotic") and media documenting the making of the video.

The song contains explicit sexual content, with references to "cum", a "blow-job", a "porno tape", and male and female sex organs. Lil' Kim labels males with premature ejaculation as "minute-men" who are unsuitable for sex. It also had references to the leaked sex tape of Lee and then-wife Pamela Anderson which occurred 4 years prior to the songs release.

In 2018, the staff of Metal Hammer included the music video in the site's list of "the 13 best nu metal videos".

== Track listing ==
=== Australian CD single ===
1. "Get Naked" [Clean]
2. "Get Naked" (featuring Fred Durst, Lil' Kim, George Clinton and Mixmaster Mike)
3. "Narcotic"
4. "Making of Mayhem"

== Charts ==
Chart (2000)	Peak position
Australia (ARIA)	76
Belgium (Ultratip Bubbling Under Flanders)	12
Netherlands (Single Top 100)	64
