= The Height of Callousness =

- Standard edition cover artwork (Note: Collector's Digipak Edition artwork is similar, but the orange and blue hues are swapped.)

Studio album by Spineshank
- Released: October 10, 2000
- Recorded: April–May 2000
- Studios: Mushroom Studios (Vancouver, British Columbia, Canada)
- Genres: Nu metal; industrial metal; electronica
- Length: 37:12
- Label: Roadrunner
- Producers: GGGarth; Mike Sarkisyan; Tommy Decker

Spineshank chronology
Strictly Diesel (1998)	The Height of Callousness (2000)	Self-Destructive Pattern (2003)

Singles from The Height of Callousness
- 1. "Synthetic" Released: September 26, 2000; 2. "New Disease" Released: January 15, 2001

The Height of Callousness is the second studio album by American metal band Spineshank, released on October 10, 2000, through Roadrunner Records. It was produced by Garth "GGGarth" Richardson alongside Spineshank guitarist Mike Sarkisyan and drummer Tommy Decker, and it was recorded at Mushroom Studios in Vancouver, Canada. The album has a heavier, more aggressive sound than the band's debut album Strictly Diesel (1998), and incorporates more melodic and electronic elements. Its themes are depression, betrayal, anger, self-doubt and self-confidence.

Critics praised The Height of Callousness for its improved, catchy songwriting but others criticized its aggression. The album sold 3,682 copies in its first week, debuting at number 183 on the US Billboard 200 chart and peaking at number 104 on the UK Albums Chart. Tracks "Synthetic" and "New Disease" were released as singles from the album, and music videos accompanied both tracks. "New Disease" reached number 33 on the US Mainstream Rock Tracks chart and number 84 on the UK Singles Chart. The album has sold over 146,000 copies in the United States as of March 2002, and the British Phonographic Industry (BPI) certified it silver in 2013 for the sale of 60,000 copies in the United Kingdom.

== Background ==
In 1998, Spineshank released their debut album Strictly Diesel, which despite receiving endorsements from Fear Factory—especially from their guitarist Dino Cazares—was a critical and commercial disappointment. Furthermore, the album's stylistic similarities with the works of Korn, Fear Factory, Deftones and Sepultura—whom Spineshank cited as musical influences—led to the band being dismissed as impersonators. Spineshank and their record label Roadrunner Records considered the album a failure. In June 1999, after touring in support of Strictly Diesel, Spineshank began writing their second album for the label. The band worked on new material for a year at their rehearsal space in Vernon, California, close to their home city Los Angeles.

When writing The Height of Callousness, Spineshank wanted to avoid repeating the mistakes they had made on Strictly Diesel, take control of their creative process and establish a musical identity that was "100% Spineshank". According to the band's vocalist Jonny Santos Strictly Diesel had been "compromised by the opinions of outsiders and by [Spineshank's] own lack of a clear identity"; Santos also said the band did not want to set any limits for themselves for their next album. To distance themselves from other contemporaneous acts, Spineshank ruled there would be "no covers, no guests and no rap". The band also wanted to move out from the shadow of their association with Fear Factory and Cazares, for whom they held no negative feelings. "With all due respect to Dino [Cazares]—and we still love him to death—he didn't write our songs", Santos said. While writing for the album, the members of Spineshank went through several negative experiences in their personal lives; Decker almost lost his son in a "horrific court battle", whilst Santos was stabbed at a party and his mother died of cancer. These experiences influenced the album's tone and lyrics.

== Recording and production ==
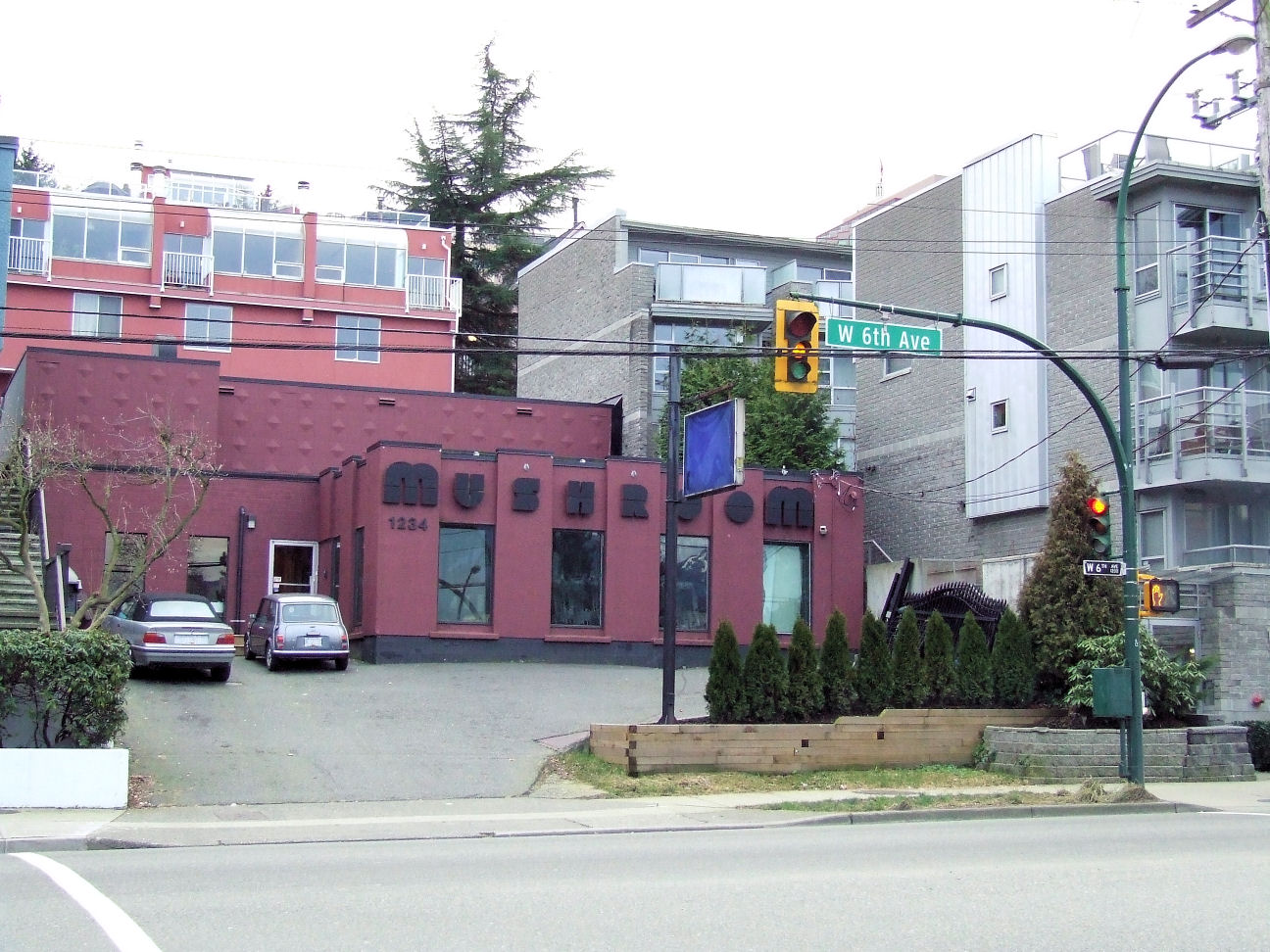
The Height of Callousness was recorded at Mushroom Studios (pictured) in Vancouver, Canada.

The Height of Callousness was recorded at Mushroom Studios in Vancouver, British Columbia, with producer Garth "GGGarth" Richardson. Amir Derakh, who co-produced, engineered and mixed Strictly Diesel, handled the album's pre-production and arranged a string section. Richardson became interested in working with Spineshank after hearing the band's demos for Strictly Diesel; he suggested the band record at Mushroom Studios to get away from Los Angeles and their friends, and to prevent a repeat of their partying and drinking habits that marred the quality and production of Strictly Diesel. On April 3, 2000, Spineshank travelled to Canada to begin recording the album. Recording sessions lasted six weeks. Richardson barred anyone from entering the studio during recording, including label and management personnel.

Spineshank spent the first three days at the studio talking "intensely" with Richardson about "how we wanted to move things up a dozen levels and start expressing who we are", according to Santos. The band also told Richardson they wanted the new album to sound "raw and in your face", akin to his work with Rage Against the Machine and the Red Hot Chilli Peppers. Richardson pushed hard to draw out the band's emotions in their performances; according to drummer Tommy Decker: "If GGGarth thinks something sucks, he'll tell you. He'll berate you for 15 minutes until you're crying and sitting in the corner." GGGarth, however, was initially hesitant about doing so; guitarist Mike Sarkisyan said; "GGGarth was like, 'Are you sure you want to do that? It ain't going to be pretty!' But we were like, 'We don't care! We just want to make the greatest record that we can' ". Although tensions were sometimes high during the recording of The Height of Callousness—the members got into a fist fight at one point, and Santos almost left the band in Vancouver—Santos and Sarkisyan felt Spineshank had emerged from the album's production "a stronger unit"; they praised Richardson for "pulling the right performances out of [the band]". Santos, who credited Richardson for helping him find his own voice, said:

There were times where it was real hard. [GGGarth would] be pushing me all the time and I'd come out of the vocal booth ready to fucking kill him. He'd just say, 'Come in here and have a listen', and I'd hear what I'd created and realise it was all worth it. He made us pull shit out of ourselves that we didn't know we had—or think we could do.

Decker and Sarkisyan were given a co-producer credit on the album, which according to Kerrang! "appears to be a polite way of saying that [Decker and Sarkisyan] were professional trainspotters in the control booth, making minute sonic changes that both [of them] admit no one in their right minds would ever care about". After recording was completed Scott Humphrey and Frank Gryner mixed the album at the Chop Shop in Los Angeles in May 2000. Decker praised Humphrey's mixing, saying: "We had been living with some of these songs for ten months. We were so sick of them, but he got [the band] excited by the way he did it." Of the 50 songs written for The Height of Callousness, Spineshank recorded 16 with Richardson then chose "the 11 most vile and pissed off ones for the record", according to Santos. Decker said one of the album's B-sides "Four Letter Word" was cut from the album because "the label liked [it] and [Spineshank] didn't". The album was completed by July 2000.

== Music and themes ==
The Height of Callousness has been described as nu metal, industrial metal, "techno-metal" and electronica. "Cyanide 2600" has been described as drum 'n' bass. The album has a heavier, more-energetic and more-aggressive sound than Strictly Diesel, although some elements on The Height of Callousness, such as drop-tuned guitars, and the mix of electronic programming and samples with live drumming, are carried over from the earlier album. The album was also noted for its slicker production, more melodic choruses and songwriting, and Santos' mix of clean singing and screaming.

The album's lyrics are themed around depression, betrayal, anger, self-doubt and self-confidence. Decker wrote most of the album's lyrics, feeling he had to prove himself due to the reception of Strictly Diesel. He said:

I was really focused and I felt like I had a lot to prove. All the shit talking got to me, and I felt like saying when we did Strictly Diesel, we were the band we always knew we could be, but we just didn't know how to get it out.

In an interview with Metal Hammer, Santos described the album's lyrics as "honest", and said it is "really about, 'Yeah, I'm fucked, there's nothing you can do to help me. I'm going to face my doom on my own' ". Sarkisyan has said The Height of Callousness is not a concept album, despite its recurring themes. According to Decker, the album's title is "about getting to that point, where you truly do not give a fuck what anyone in the world thinks! That's the point where nothing matters except the real shit, the stuff that's in your head, its a fucked up place to be emotionally."

== Release and promotion ==
In the August 2000 issue of Metal Hammer, Spineshank announced they had completed The Height of Callousness and exclusively revealed the album's track listing to the magazine. Roadrunner released the album in Europe on October 9, 2000, in the United States the day after. In the lead-up to the album's release, Spineshank were due to join the Tattoo the Earth tour in July 2000 as a replacement for Puya but canceled due to communication issues. "Our booking agent told us we were on the tour, but we weren't. We ended up following it for four or five shows and played only one of them", Sarkisyan said. In August 2000, the band filmed a music video for "Synthetic" with director Nathan Cox, and filmed a cameo appearance for the 2001 film Knight Club. Afterward, Spineshank toured the U.S. with Hed PE and Slaves on Dope from September to October 2000. Spineshank was also promoted through appearances on MTV's compilation The Return of the Rock Volume 2, which was released in November 2000; on the soundtrack album for the 2001 film 3000 Miles to Graceland; and in the video games Shaun Palmer's Pro Snowboarder (2001), MX Superfly (2002) and Backyard Wrestling: Don't Try This at Home (2003).

Between February 20 and March 9, 2001, Spineshank toured as support for Orgy on their Vapor Transmission tour, then toured with Disturbed as support for their headlining U.S. tour from March to April 2001. Spineshank also performed on the second stage of the 2001 Ozzfest tour, which Sarkisyan credited with giving the band significant exposure. On July 25, 2001, Roadrunner re-released The Height of Callousness in Europe as a "Collectors Digipak Edition" that includes four bonus tracks, and enhanced CD music videos of "Synthetic" and "New Disease" in an attempt to "combat expensive US imports" of the album. The digipak edition was released in the U.S. on September 25, 2001. Between September 2 and September 8, 2001, Spineshank embarked on a brief tour of the United Kingdom with labelmates Dry Kill Logic as support, and participated in in-store signing events in the country.

== Reception ==
=== Commercial ===
The Height of Callousness sold 3,682 copies in its first week, entering the Billboard 200 chart at number 183 and the UK Albums Chart at number 123. In June 2001, the album peaked on the UK Albums Chart at number 104. As of March 2002, The Height of Callousness has sold over 146,000 units in the U.S., according to Nielsen SoundScan. On July 22, 2013, the British Phonographic Industry (BPI) certified the album silver, signifying the sale of 60,000 copies in the UK.

"Synthetic" was issued as the lead single from The Height of Callousness on September 26, 2000, receiving moderate radio airplay and rotation on MTV. On January 15, 2001, "New Disease" was released to radio stations in the United States as the album's second single. "New Disease" experienced significant radio success, reaching number 33 on the Billboard Mainstream Rock Tracks chart on April 21, 2001. The single also received airplay on the British alternative radio station Xfm. Coinciding with the band's tour of the UK, Roadrunner released "New Disease" as a single in that country on September 10, 2001, reaching number 84 on the UK Singles Chart. Billboard's Airplay Monitor ranked "New Disease" at number 78 on their list of the "Most-Played Active Rock Songs of 2001". Despite the single's chart success, David Locano, a Roadrunner rep, said "New Disease" suffered from being released as the album's second single "in a time when radio really didn't have patience for follow-ups to mediocre performing songs".

=== Critical ===
Professional ratings
Review scores
Source	Rating
AllMusic	2.5/5 stars
Blabbermouth.net	8/10
Classic Rock	4/5 stars
The Encyclopedia of Popular Music	4/5 stars
Kerrang!	4/5 stars
NME	2/10
Rock Hard	8.5/10
Rock Sound	4/5 stars
Terrorizer	6.5/10
Vue Weekly	3/4 stars

The Height of Callousness received generally positive reviews. Several critics compared the album to Strictly Diesel and saw it as an improvement over that album. A retrospective review of The Height of Callousness in The Encyclopedia of Popular Music said it "could have been the work of a different band". Liam Sheils of Kerrang! and Lewis Fraser of Rock Sound both said while The Height of Callousness is not a radical reinvention of Spineshank's sound, its memorable choruses significantly strengthen the album; both reviewers also said it compliments its aggressive edge. Others, however, were more critical; Catherine Yates of Terrorizer commented the album's tracks, except "New Disease" and "Cyanide 2600", "fail to provide true neck-snapping euphoria". Andy Capper of NME said the album was proof that the nu metal genre was "bland, copycat, inspirationless garbage", perceiving the album's production and "radio playability" to be a cover for its lack of original riffs and "godawful" lyrics.

Kerry L. Smith of AllMusic found the album difficult to listen to due to its aggression. Blabbermouth.net said the "harsh edge" of its guitars is at odds with the accessibility of its material but that this is "a relatively minor flaw that should have no bearing on [Spineshank]'s ability to make a significant commercial impact". Vue Weekly's T.C. Shaw found the album becomes more accessible with repeated listens despite its aggressive qualities. According to Gregg Pratt of Exclaim!, the album's anger is "forced" and its use of electronics is "kind of embarrassing sounding somehow".

Kerrang!, Metal Hammer and Loudwire have included The Height of Callousness on retrospective album lists for the nu metal genre. "New Disease" has also appeared on retrospective nu metal songs lists by Metal Hammer, NME and Spin. In 2022, a Revolver readers' poll of the "Top 5 Heaviest Nu-Metal Songs" ranked the album's title track fifth.

== Track listing ==
All music is composed by Spineshank.

No.	Title	Lyrics	Length
1.	"Asthmatic"	Tommy Decker	3:30
2.	"The Height of Callousness"	Decker	3:03
3.	"Synthetic"	Decker	3:10
4.	"New Disease"	Decker	3:14
5.	"(Can't Be) Fixed"	Decker	3:12
6.	"Cyanide 2600"	Decker; Jonny Santos; Robert Garcia	3:10
7.	"Play God"	Santos; Garcia	4:02
8.	"Malnutrition"	Decker	3:30
9.	"Seamless"	Santos	3:44
10.	"Negative Space"	Santos	2:39
11.	"Transparent"	Santos	3:53
Total length:			37:12

Collector's Digipak Edition bonus tracks
No.	Title	Lyrics	Length
12.	"Perfect Ending"	Santos	3:48
13.	"Full Circle"	Santos	3:26
14.	"The Height of Callousness" (Fist Fuck Integrity Mix (Note: Listed as "Force Fed Integrity Mix" on US versions of the album))		3:19
15.	"Asthmatic" (Punctured Lung Mix)		4:29
Total length:			52:15

== Personnel ==
Personnel per liner notes.

Spineshank
- Jonny Santos – lead vocals
- Mike Sarkisyan – guitars
- Robert Garcia – bass, backing vocals
- Tommy Decker – drums, electronics

Additional personnel

- Anthony "Fu" Valcic – programming
- Scott Humphrey – additional programming (at The Chop Shop)
- Frank Gryner – additional programming (at The Chop Shop)

Artwork

- P. R. Brown – cover photograph, art direction and design
- F. Scott Schuler – band photography
Production
- Garth "GGGarth" Richardson – production
- Mike Sarkisyan – co-production
- Tommy Decker – co-production
- Amir Derakh – pre-production, song arrangements
- Dave Ogilvie – remixing, additional production (14, 15)
- Scott Humphrey – mixing, additional recording (at The Chop Shop)
- Frank Gryner – mixing, additional recording (at The Chop Shop)
- Dan Burns – assistant mixing
- Andre "The German" Wahl – engineering
- Scott Ternan – assistant engineering
- Ben Kaplan – digital editing
- Alex Aligizakis – assistant digital editing
- Ted Jensen – mastering (at Sterling Sound)

== Chart positions ==
Chart (2000–01)	Peak position
UK Albums (OCC)	104
UK Rock & Metal Albums (OCC)	5
US Billboard 200	183
US Heatseekers Albums (Billboard)	13

== Certifications and sales ==
Region	Certification	Certified units/sales
United Kingdom (BPI)	Silver	60,000^{^}
United States	—	146,568
^{^} Shipments figures based on certification alone.

== Release history ==
Release history for The Height of Callousness
Region	Label	Format	Date	Catalog #	Ref.
Europe	Roadrunner	CD	October 9, 2000	RR 8563-2	
United States	Roadrunner	CD	October 10, 2000	RR 8563-2	
Europe	Roadrunner	CD (Collector's Digipak Edition)	July 23, 2001	RR 8563-5	
United States	Roadrunner	CD (Collector's Digipak Edition)	September 25, 2001	168 618 468-2	
Various	Real Gone Music	LP	April 1, 2022	RGM-1282	

== Bibliography ==
- Anon. (September 22, 2000a). "Rock | Going for Adds" (PDF). R&R. No. 1369. p. 162. Archived (PDF) from the original on June 9, 2023 – via worldradiohistory.com.
- Anon. (October 28, 2000b). "Billboard's Heatseekers Albums Chart". Billboard. Vol. 112, no. 44. Nielsen Business Media, Inc. p. 25. Archived from the original on October 8, 2023.
- Anon. (October 28, 2000c). "Billboard 200 Continued". Billboard. Vol. 112, no. 44. Nielsen Business Media, Inc. p. 101. Archived from the original on October 8, 2023.
- Anon. (October 28, 2000d). "Billboard Video Monitor". Billboard. Vol. 112, no. 44. Nielsen Business Media, Inc. p. 91. Archived from the original on October 8, 2023.
- Anon. (December 14, 2000e). "Charts". Rolling Stone. No. 856. p. 184. ProQuest 2549065034. Archived from the original on May 2, 2024.
- Anon. (January 12, 2001a). "Upcoming New Releases: Rock" (PDF). HITS. Vol. 15, no. 726. p. 53. Archived (PDF) from the original on June 9, 2023 – via worldradiohistory.com.
- Anon. (April 21, 2001b). "Billboard Mainstream Rock Tracks". Billboard. Vol. 113, no. 16. Nielsen Business Media, Inc. p. 77. Archived from the original on October 8, 2023.
- Anon. (June 23, 2001c). "All the Charts: Exposure" (PDF). Music Week. p. 23. Archived (PDF) from the original on June 23, 2023 – via worldradiohistory.com.
- Anon. (December 21, 2001d). "Most-Played Active Rock Songs of 2001" (PDF). Billboard Airplay Monitor. Vol. 9, no. 51. Nielsen Business Media, Inc. p. 35. Archived (PDF) from the original on February 14, 2022 – via worldradiohistory.com.
- Capper, Andy (November 18, 2000). Robinson, John (ed.). "Albums". NME. UK: IPC. p. 41.
- Fraser, Lewis (November 2000a). "Spineshank: Giddy Heights". Rock Sound. No. 18. UK: Freeway Press. pp. 40–41.
- Fraser, Lewis (November 2000b). "Reviews: Metal". Rock Sound. No. 18. UK: Freeway Press. p. 93.
- Ingham, Chris (February 2001). "Spineshank: Growing Up is Hard to Do". Metal Hammer. No. 83. UK: Future plc. pp. 64–66.
- Ingham, Chris (2002). "Spineshank". The Book of Metal. UK: London : Carlton. p. 208. ISBN 978-1-84222-683-4 – via Internet Archive.
- Karpe, Matt (2021). "Spineshank". Nu Metal: A Definitive Guide. UK: Sonicbond Publishing. pp. 153–159. ISBN 9781789520637.
- Kulkarni, Neil (October 2000). "The Spineshank Redemption". Metal Hammer. No. 79. UK: Future plc. pp. 32–33.
- Larkin, Colin, ed. (2006). "Spineshank". The encyclopedia of popular music. Vol. 7 (4th ed.). New York : MUZE : Oxford University Press. pp. 662–663. ISBN 978-0-19-531373-4 – via Internet Archive.
- Sadler, Darren (Christmas 2000). "Albums". Classic Rock. No. 22. UK: Future plc. pp. 69–70. ISSN 1464-7834.
- Sands, Richard (January 11, 2002). "Free Plug Day: Alternative's First Quarter Releases" (PDF). Gavin Report. No. 2358. pp. 16–17. Archived (PDF) from the original on June 23, 2023 – via worldradiohistory.com.
- Savio, Amanda (November 23, 2000). "Aggressive Spineshank finds their calling | A complete guide..." Record-Journal. US. pp. A3. Archived from the original on June 6, 2023.
- Shaw, T.C. (April 19, 2001). "New Sounds". Vue Weekly. p. 33 – via Internet Archive.
- Sheils, Liam (October 7, 2000). "Albums". Kerrang!. No. 822. UK: EMAP. p. 45.
- Sindell, Joshua (October 7, 2000). "A New Level". Kerrang!. No. 822. UK: EMAP. pp. 20–21.
- Taylor, Mick, ed. (August 2000). "Spineshank Hit the Heights". Metal Hammer. No. 77. UK: Future plc. p. 15.
- Turman, Katherine (June 23, 2001). "For Those About to Rock..." Billboard. Vol. 113, no. 25. Nielsen Business Media, Inc. pp. 28, 40. Archived from the original on October 8, 2023.
- Udo, Tommy (2002). "Spineshank". Brave nu world. London : Sanctuary. pp. 159–163. ISBN 978-1-86074-415-0 – via Internet Archive.
- Wonsiewicz, Steve (October 10, 2000). "Organic Growth at Rock for Spineshank" (PDF). R&R. No. 1373. US. p. 41. Archived (PDF) from the original on June 9, 2023 – via worldradiohistory.com.
- Yates, Catherine (October 2000). "Selected & Dissected". Terrorizer. No. 83. UK. p. 58. ISSN 1350-6978.
