= Spineshank =

American nu metal band

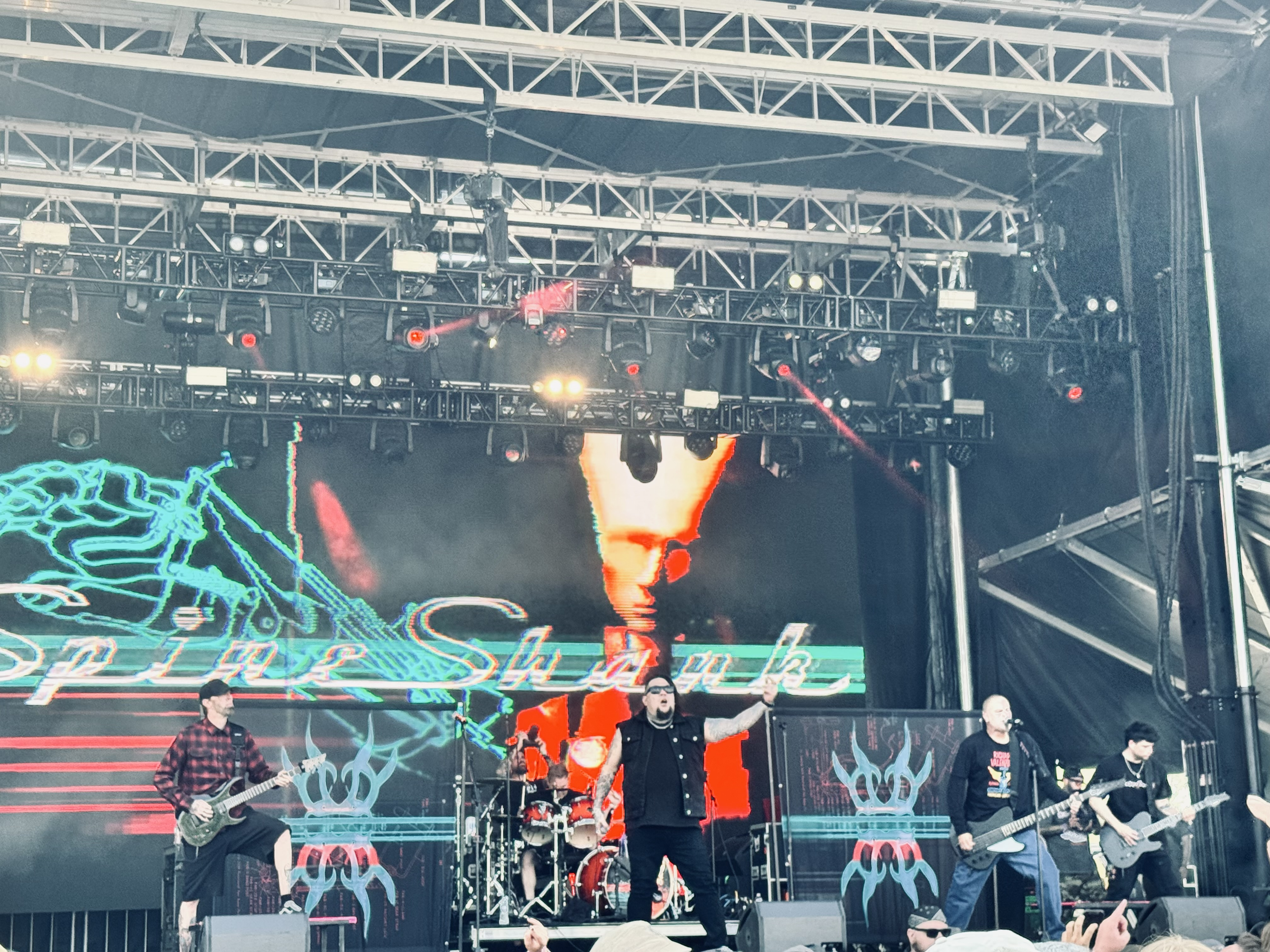
- Spineshank live in 2025. L-R: Jason Hager, Tommy Decker, Jonny Santos, Robert Garcia, Tommy Decker Jr.

Background information
- Also known as: Basic Enigma
- Origin: Los Angeles, California, U.S.
- Genres: Nu metal; industrial metal; alternative metal
- Years active: 1996–2004; 2008–2016; 2025–present
- Labels: Roadrunner; Century Media
- Members: Jonny Santos; Tommy Decker, Sr.; Tommy Decker, Jr.; James Mills
- Past members: Marlo Gonzalez; Brandon Espinoza; Mike Sarkisyan; Jason Hager; Robert Garcia
- Website: spineshank.net

Spineshank is an American nu metal / industrial metal band from Los Angeles. The band have released four studio albums: Strictly Diesel (1998), The Height of Callousness (2000), Self-Destructive Pattern (2003), and Anger Denial Acceptance (2012).

== History ==
=== Early works, formation and signing with Roadrunner (1996–1997) ===
Before Spineshank formed in 1996, bassist and vocalist Jonny Santos, guitarists Marlo Gonzalez and Tim Mankowski, and drummer Tommy Decker were members of a band called Basic Enigma. They released a demo EP in 1994 named Drunk With Power. According to Decker, they learned "everything not to do" in Basic Enigma, and were heavily inspired by Pantera, Slayer, and White Zombie at the time. Upon hearing Fear Factory's Demanufacture, the band took a new approach, writing songs and recording them before actually playing them. This made them realize they needed to change the way they did things. Around the same time, Mike Sarkisyan replaced Mankowski on guitar. Santos initially played guitar in the band, but left the band for a period of time when he became a father, and when asked back, the band already had two guitar players, so he switched to bass, which he wasn't comfortable with; when auditioning singers, he jokingly sang "Seasons in the Abyss" inbetween waiting, prompting the rest of the band to insist him being the permanent singer.

Basic Enigma later broke up but soon reformed as Spineshank. They then started recording demos and handed them out at several shows in Los Angeles. After the release of a demo in 1996, Gonzalez departed from the lineup; thus, Sarkisyan became the band's sole guitarist. Eventually, Fear Factory guitarist Dino Cazares heard one of their demos and gave them a chance to open a show for Fear Factory and Coal Chamber at a concert held in Los Angeles with other notable bands such as Snot, Soulfly, Sepultura, and Danzig. As a result of these shows, Spineshank piqued the interest of the A&R director of Roadrunner Records, Kevin Estrada. Estrada liked them because of their experimentation but was hesitant to sign them due to their lack of a bass player, and he didn't like that Santos played the bass and sang because he felt playing the bass "inhibited" him from singing. After several lineup changes, the band eventually found Robert Garcia, who became their bass player.

Estrada worked with them on a song that later became "Detached," and after multiple performances, Estrada was pleased and wanted to do a demo deal. After speaking with Roadrunner, they were so impressed with the demos that they wanted to skip the demo deal and sign the band instead. Spineshank went on to sign a seven-album deal with Roadrunner, guaranteeing $30,000 for their first album plus an extra $10,000 for subsequent records with the label.

=== Strictly Diesel, The Height of Callousness and Self-Destructive Pattern (1998–2003) ===
Spineshank circa 1998

Spineshank released their debut album Strictly Diesel on September 22, 1998. Fear Factory vocalist Burton C. Bell provides vocals on the track "Stain". Spineshank joined Fear Factory and Kilgore on a European tour that year.

Spineshank's second album The Height of Callousness was released on October 10, 2000. Unlike their debut album, The Height of Callousness has a strong industrial metal influence. The band was featured at Ozzfest 2001, and toured with such artists as Disturbed, Hed PE, Orgy and Mudvayne in support of the album's release. The songs "Synthetic" and "New Disease" were released as singles in 2000 and 2001, respectively.

The band's third album Self-Destructive Pattern was released on September 9, 2003. The album's lead single "Smothered" was nominated for a Grammy in the category of Best Metal Performance (2004). Shortly after the album was released the band went on a European tour with Ill Niño and Chimaira. A show in the Netherlands was filmed on October 6, and was to become a DVD entitled Roadrage. However, it was never officially released.

=== Lineup change and hiatus (2004–2008) ===
In January 2004, it was reported that Santos had officially left Spineshank. Tommy Decker stated that the split was "amicable" and was mainly due to "musical differences", Decker later said a big part of why Santos left was because the band wanted "to go heavier" but Santos didn't. Santos later spoke about leaving Spineshank in a 2006 interview, stating: "I think that moment in time we weren't getting along the greatest. I was not happy with the direction of the music anymore, and I also think that the band had kind of just run its course. I think that Spineshank did what it was meant to do. I don't regret ever being in that band. It's some of the best memories of my life, but I think that the day was up."

On January 17, 2004, Spineshank launched a search for a new vocalist, and on November 7, 2005, Spineshank's official website announced that they would be working with Brandon Espinoza. They also stated that they had already been working together for five months at the time, and had produced five songs. At the time, the band did not intend to continue to use the name Spineshank. Meanwhile, Santos went on to release two albums with his new band Silent Civilian.

On July 7, 2006, Espinoza posted an update on the band's message board, and stated that they were still in the process of writing material. Then, on February 7, 2008, after almost two years of silence about the band, Espinoza announced that the band had broken up due to the lack of chemistry between its members. On February 24, the band (excluding Espinoza) announced open tryouts for a new unnamed project.

=== Anger Denial Acceptance, reunion with original lineup and disbanding (2008–2025) ===
The thing is we broke up and the Grammy thing [happened] during the same week. Things were already in motion, and it was already kind of over at the time. I mean, we were burned out. It's weird because it never set in, and we never got to be "Grammy-nominated Spineshank." It was like, okay, we got this nomination and we're done.

— Tommy Decker on the band being nominated for a Grammy

In 2008, Spineshank reunited with Santos, and in August of that year recorded a demo. Drummer Tommy Decker said of the reunion, "First of all, you don't have to worry about us abandoning our sound; there will be plenty of electronics/loops/synths on this record. Jonny is also singing better than he ever has, so there will be a ton of singing and melody as well. This will definitely be heavier than our previous albums but it will not be all bashing. I can wholeheartedly promise you that we will not be trying to be anything we are not. This is simply going to be Spineshank five years later. There will be a few new elements but it will be undeniably us (for better or worse!!!). . . " Santos stated in an interview that Anger Denial Acceptance "will be the Spineshank record we always wanted to make, and not what the label wanted us to make" and that it won't be a "commercially-driven record".

On October 3, 2011, Spineshank debuted a new song "Murder Suicide" via Noisecreep. On June 19, 2012, the band released Anger Denial Acceptance through Century Media.

After several years of silence, on February 16, 2016, Mike Sarkisyan in an online interview said that the band had completed what they had set out to do and that there were no plans to continue the band.

In July 2020, Spineshank's former label Warner Music Group (who owns Roadrunner Records) released "Infected", a song that was originally a b-side on the Japanese release of their 2003 album Self-Destructive Pattern, to Spotify. The song had leaked to online outlets well over a decade prior.

=== Third reunion (2025–present) ===
In January 2025, Spineshank announced a reunion specifically for the September festival Louder Than Life. In addition to Santos, Garcia, and Decker, the lineup also featured Tommy Decker, Jr. on guitar (since Sarkisyan essentially retired from the music industry) and Jason Hager on guitar as well (founding member of the band Chimaira). In 2025, the band has recorded new material and made a return to touring. In November 2025 the band embarked on a UK & Ireland tour with Drowning Pool, followed by tour dates in Europe supported by Hed PE. Spineshank also performed at the 2026 Download Festival. UK based musician James Mills stepped in on Vocals for a handful of shows when Jonny Santos was delayed in arriving for the UK tour, joining the band mid set in Norwich. Mills was recruited to cover bass and backing vocal duties for the summer 2026 Outta Control US tour in July & August with Nonpoint, Soil and Hed PE, and then fully joined the band as the new bassist in October 2026 on the bands European/UK Tour with Hed Pe, Alien Ant farm, Skindred, South of Salem and Severance.

== Musical style and influences ==
Spineshank has been described as nu metal, industrial metal, and alternative metal. They have been compared to the likes of Fear Factory, Orgy, Static-X, Coal Chamber, and System of a Down.

Jonny Santos has cited Robb Flynn, James Hetfield, and Tom Araya as his "biggest heroes", but was inspired to start playing guitar by Randy Rhoads, and Eddie Van Halen. Slash also had a big influence on Santos as a kid, stating "That's why most of my playing is all in pretty much, like, pentatonic patterns. I stay in a certain box that I feel really comfortable with, and I use my wah pedal quite a bit. Slash, to me, is just, like, God." Santos has also cited Sepultura, Machine Head, Ministry, and Godflesh as influences for Spineshank.

== Band members ==
Current lineup

- Tommy Decker – drums, programming, keyboards (1996–2016, 2025–present)
- Jonny Santos – lead vocals (1996–2004, 2008–2016, 2025–present); bass (1996–1997)
- Tommy Decker, Jr. – guitars (2025–present)
- James Mills – bass, backing vocals (2026–present)

Former members

- Marlo Gonzalez – guitars (1996)
- Brandon Espinoza – vocals (2005–2007)
- Mike Sarkisyan – guitars, piano (1996–2016)
- Robert Garcia – bass, backing vocals (1997–2016, 2025–2026)
- Jason Hager – guitars (2025–2026)

Timeline

== Discography ==
Spineshank discography
- Studio albums: 4
- Compilation albums: 1
- Singles: 7

=== Studio albums ===
List of studio albums, with selected details and chart positions
Title	Album details	Peak chart positions				Certifications
Title	Album details	US	US Heat.	AUS	UK	Certifications
Strictly Diesel	Released: September 22, 1998; Label: Roadrunner; Formats: CD, CS, DI, LP	—	—	—	129	
The Height of Callousness	Released: October 10, 2000; Label: Roadrunner; Formats: CD, CS, DI, LP	183	13	—	104	BPI: Silver
Self-Destructive Pattern	Released: September 9, 2003; Label: Roadrunner; Formats: CD, DI	89	—	89	83	
Anger Denial Acceptance	Released: June 19, 2012; Label: Century Media; Formats: CD, DI	—	—	—	—	
"—" denotes a release that did not chart.

=== Compilation albums ===
List of compilation albums, with selected details
Title	Album details
The Best of Spineshank	Released: January 29, 2008; Label: Roadrunner; Formats: CD, DI

=== Singles ===
List of singles, with selected chart positions
Title	Year	Peak chart positions		Album
Title	Year	US Main.	UK	Album
"Stovebolt"	1998	—	—	Strictly Diesel
"Synthetic"	2000	—	—	The Height of Callousness
"New Disease"	2001	33	84	The Height of Callousness
"Smothered"	2003	—	—	Self-Destructive Pattern
"Nothing Left for Me"	2012	—	—	Anger Denial Acceptance
"—" denotes a release that did not chart.

== References in popular culture ==
- The song "New Disease" was featured in the soundtrack for the movie 3000 Miles to Graceland, and the video games Shaun Palmer's Pro Snowboarder in 2001 and MX Superfly in 2002.
- The song "Synthetic" was featured in the video games MX Superfly in 2002 and Backyard Wrestling: Don't Try This at Home in 2003.
- In the 2002 black comedy film The Rules of Attraction (based on the 1987 book of the same name), a Height of Callousness poster is displayed in Marc's bedroom, a junkie played by former child-star Fred Savage.
- The song "Beginning of the End" was featured on the soundtrack of the 2003 film Freddy vs. Jason and "Slavery" was used in the film, but not included on the soundtrack.
- The song "Smothered" was featured in the video game Backyard Wrestling: Don't Try This at Home.
- The song "Cyanide 2600" was used in the film Resident Evil.

== Bibliography ==
- Karpe, Matt (2021). "Spineshank". Nu Metal: A Definitive Guide. UK: Sonicbond Publishing. pp. 153–159. ISBN 9781789520637.
