= Strictly Diesel =

Studio album by Spineshank
- Released: September 22, 1998
- Studios: NRG; LAFX (North Hollywood)
- Genres: Nu metal; industrial metal
- Length: 47:43
- Label: Roadrunner
- Producers: Jay Baumgardner; Amir Derakh

Spineshank chronology
Strictly Diesel (1998)	The Height of Callousness (2000)

Strictly Diesel is the debut studio album by American metal band Spineshank, released on September 22, 1998, through Roadrunner Records. After forming in 1996, Spineshank shopped a demo tape around the Los Angeles area, bringing them to the attention of Fear Factory guitarist Dino Cazares. The band subsequently began opening for Fear Factory and other bands from early 1997 onwards, attracting the attention of Roadrunner A&R rep Kevin Estrada, who signed the band. Produced by Jay Baumgardner and Amir Derakh, Strictly Diesel is a nu metal and industrial metal album whose sound was compared to bands such as Deftones, Fear Factory, Korn and Sepultura—all of whom Spineshank cited as musical influences.

Owing to their association with Fear Factory, Spineshank were touted by Kerrang! as "the next great metal band to come out of LA". Upon its release, Strictly Diesel received generally positive reviews from critics but proved to be a commercial disappointment, only reaching number 129 on the UK Albums Chart. It failed to chart in the United States, where it sold 66,000 copies by March 2002, and it was considered a failure by both the band and their record label. Spineshank felt they had not properly established a musical identity on Strictly Diesel, and they were soon dismissed as impersonators of their influences by the music press. They would later consider their next album, The Height of Callousness (2000), to be their true debut album, with Strictly Diesel being a "glorified demo", according to guitarist Mike Sarkisyan. However, the band has also acknowledged its significance in shaping their future output.

In 2021, the staff of Revolver included the album in their list of the "20 Essential Nu-Metal Albums".

== Background ==
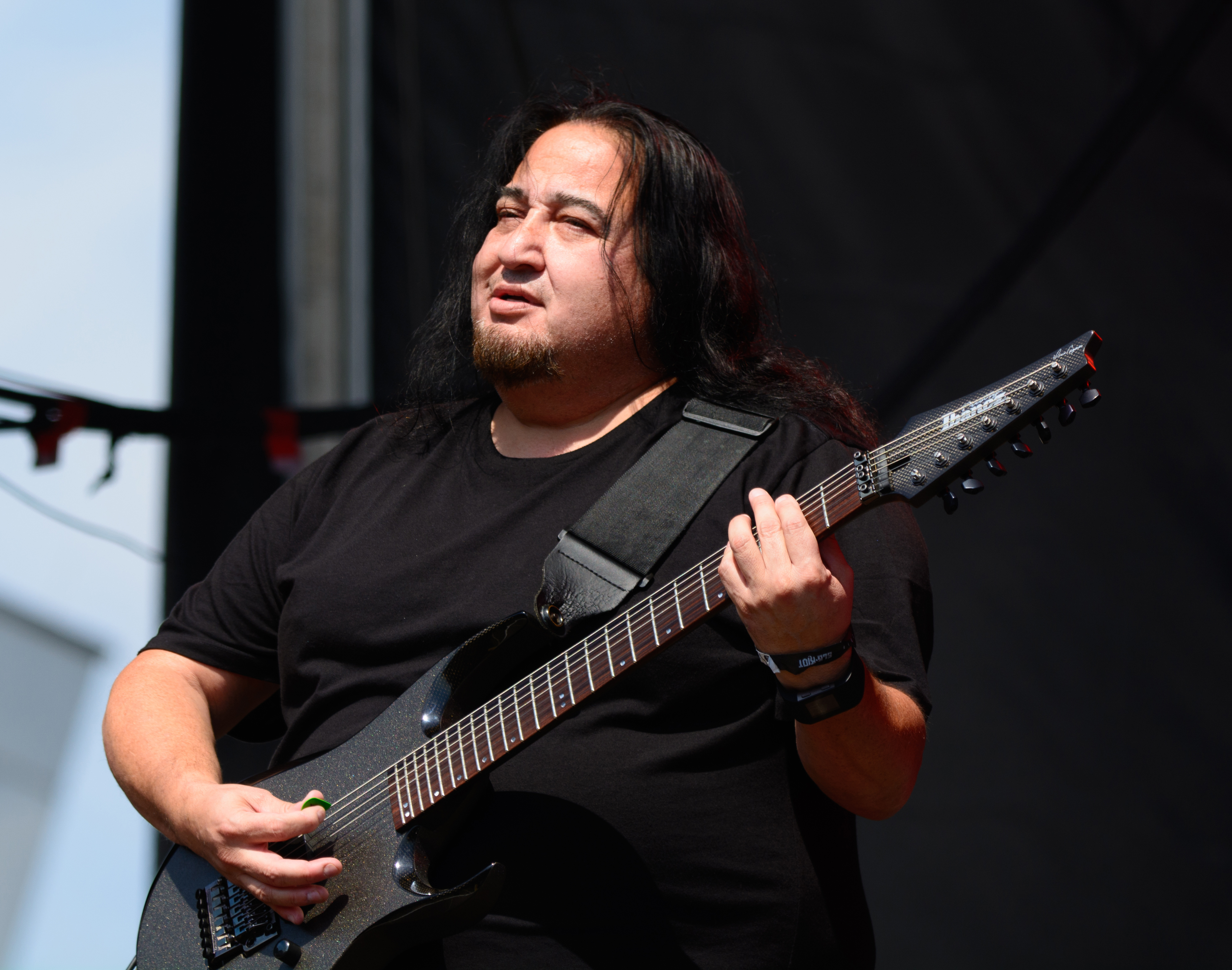
Fear Factory guitarist Dino Cazares (pictured) supported Spineshank throughout much of their early career, and he was widely seen as a "father figure" to the band.

Spineshank was formed in February 1996 by vocalist Jonny Santos, guitarist Mike Sarkisyan and drummer Tom Decker. Santos, Sarkisyan and Decker had grown up together in the San Gabriel Valley in Los Angeles and had previously been members of a band called Basic Enigma, which disbanded after its members heard Fear Factory's Demanufacture (1995). They recruited Robert Garcia of Swinside Circle as their bassist after meeting each other at a backyard party. Instead of performing any live shows, Spineshank chose to focus on writing and recording new music for the first few months of their existence. In September 1996, the band recorded a three song demo tape with the songs "Stain", "Mend" and "Novocaine". The band made 1,000 copies of the demo, which they handed out at various shows and venues across Los Angeles. One of the demo tapes was given to Miguel "Meegs" Rascón, guitarist of Coal Chamber, who in turn gave the demo to Fear Factory guitarist Dino Cazares, who lived next door to him. A week later, Cazares met and befriended Sarkisyan at a Sick of It All concert in Santa Monica.

Spineshank made their live debut on January 11, 1997, after Sarkisyan asked Cazares if his band could open for Coal Chamber and Fear Factory at the Whisky a Go Go in Los Angeles. The band's reputation as a live act helped them secure further opening slots for Brujeria, Coal Chamber, Snot, Soulfly, Sepultura, and Danzig. Spineshank were soon offered record deals by Earache Records, Noise Records, and Roadrunner Records. Roadrunner was the only label of the three that offered the band a formal deal; Kevin Estrada, the label's A&R rep for the West Coast, offered the band a "demo deal", giving them the opportunity to work with producers Jay Baumgardner, Jay Gordon and Amir Derakh—who had worked together on Coal Chamber's self-titled debut album in 1997—on a demo that, if Roadrunner liked it, would lead to the band getting signed. However, Estrada reconsidered his offer and instead told the band he wanted to sign them outright. Sarkisyan recalled: "Kevin [Estrada said], 'You know what, I was thinking of giving you guys a demo deal but screw that, I just want to offer you a record deal.' I remember that was one of the happiest days of my life." Spineshank signed a seven-album deal with Roadrunner (the only type of contract the label offered at the time), guaranteeing a $30,000 advance for their first album with a $10,000 increase to that amount per the band's subsequent albums with the label. Cazares assisted the band in their signing with Roadrunner, with Fear Factory's attorney helping them sort out their contract as they did not have a lawyer at the time.

== Recording and composition ==
After signing with Roadrunner, Spineshank commenced work on Strictly Diesel, with Baumgardner and Derakh as producers. The album was recorded at NRG Recording Studios and LAFX Studios (both located in North Hollywood, California). The album's sound drew from, and was compared to, Korn, Deftones, Machine Head, Sepultura, Misery Loves Co., Tool and Pantera—bands which Spineshank cited as musical influences. Sarkisyan cited the Deftones' second album Around the Fur (1997) as a "huge influence" on the album's sound in particular. In a 1998 interview with Loudside, Santos cited Mike Patton, Burton C. Bell, Chino Moreno and Maynard James Keenan as influences on his vocals. Decker was responsible for its electronic beats. The album's programming and loops were handled by Josh Abraham, who was given a co-writing credit on seven of the album's fourteen songs. According to an official press release, Abraham "helped to bring out Spineshank's industrial side."

Santos said that Strictly Diesel "is about coming from nothing to something", and its lyrics drew from the personal lives of Spineshank's members "and how overcoming their hardships have made them stronger". Explaining the album's title, Decker stated:

A diesel truck starts out slow. It gets on the freeway and everybody hates it, because it's in the way and it's slow. But once it hits 80 miles an hour, nobody's gonna even come f**king close to it. And that's Spineshank. Right now, we're doing 50 and building.

Whilst recording at NRG, Spineshank shared the same studio as Korn, and they quickly took on the band's partying and drinking habits. By the end of recording, Spineshank were spending up to $3,000 per week on alcohol, which they put down as studio expenses. Critic and author Colin Larkin wrote in The Encyclopedia of Popular Music (2006) that Spineshank were "more interested emulating the hedonistic behaviour of their collective idols Mötley Crüe, than concentrating on working—much to the annoyance of [their] record company." Santos recalled: "[Roadrunner] went f**king apeshit. They were like, 'You're not there to party, you're here to make an album!' ". In later interviews, Spineshank felt that their drinking habits negatively affected the quality of Strictly Diesel, as they were unable to "put everything [they had] into [the album]". It would ended up costing over $100,000 to make, well above the $30,000 advance that Roadrunner was only obligated to give the band.

== Release and reception ==
Professional ratings
Review scores
Source	Rating
AllMusic	3/5 stars
Chronicles of Chaos	7/10
Collector's Guide to Heavy Metal	7/10
The Encyclopedia of Popular Music	2/5 stars
Iowa State Daily	3/5 stars
Kerrang!	4/5 stars
Metal.de	6/10
Rock Hard	7.5/10

Strictly Diesel was released in the United States on September 22, 1998, and in Europe on September 28, 1998. Its cover artwork features an "old ... beyond fucked up piano" found at one of the studios Spineshank recorded at. The album debuted at number 129 on the UK Albums Chart. Although the album did not chart there or receive much radio airplay, Strictly Diesel managed to sell over 66,000 copies in the United States by March 24, 2002, according to Nielsen SoundScan. In December 1998, Santos reported that the album was selling around 600 to 700 copies per week.

Strictly Diesel received generally positive reviews from critics. Jody Webb of Chronicles of Chaos liked over half of the album's tracks, but felt that it lacked "anything killer". Quoting/paraphrasing a line from the album's press kit, Oliver of Metal.de called the album's sound "Fear-Factory-Sepultura-Tool-Deftones-light." A contemporary review of the album by Chad Calek of the Iowa State Daily anticipated that Spineshank would "have a hard time separating itself from the oncoming masses of bands that share its same sound", with The Encyclopedia of Popular Music similarly describing it as "a derivative muddle of fashionable sounds".

Mark Griffiths of Kerrang! praised Abraham's programming and Santos' vocals, the latter which he compared favorably with Burton C. Bell. He also acknowledged that whilst Strictly Diesel bore elements from Korn, Deftones and Tool, it had "just enough depth and originality to avoid outright plagiarism" and ultimately considered the album to be "one of the most blistering debuts in some time". Chris Ayers of The Herald opined that the band mixed "the thrashy aggression of Sepultura with the mechanical mayhem of Fear Factory". AllMusic reviewer Greg Prato similarly felt that the album's sound wasn't "a direct ripoff of [Spineshank's] influences; it's hard to think of any band today that would have had the guts to redo the Beatles' classic "While My Guitar Gently Weeps" as a distorted, heavy dirge." Rock Hard also praised the cover of "While My Guitar Gently Weeps", although the reviewer conceded that the main reason they liked Strictly Diesel was because it was a "potent (yes, yes...) copy [sic]" of Fear Factory's sound.

== Touring and aftermath ==
Following the album's release, Spineshank toured Europe as support for Fear Factory and Kilgore in late 1998. In January 1999, the band joined Fear Factory and System of a Down for a tour of the United States that was intended to end in February 1999. However, on January 23, 1999, the truck containing the gear of all three bands (worth $250,000) was stolen in Philadelphia and several tour dates had to be postponed to March 1999. Roadrunner pulled Spineshank's touring support following the theft, and it worsened pre-existing tensions within the band. The band later toured as support for Fear Factory, Sepultura and Hed PE between April and May 1999, and they also made an appearance at the Dynamo Open Air festival on May 21, 1999, performing on the Gallery Stage.

Spineshank's association with Fear Factory created pre-release hype for Strictly Diesel; less than two months before the album's release, Kerrang! hailed Spineshank as "the next great metal band to come out of LA". A guest appearance by Fear Factory's then-vocalist, Burton C. Bell, on the album's final track "Stain (Start the Machine)" generated further publicity for the band. After Strictly Diesel's release, however, Spineshank came to be seen and dismissed as impersonators of their influences by the music press. Garcia noted: "When it first came out, [the album] got rave reviews. But all of a sudden, it became cool to hate Spineshank, and this was mostly overseas." Both Spineshank and Roadrunner Records ultimately considered the album a failure. In 2001, Decker told Kerrang!: "I honestly thought it was all over. I honestly thought we'd blown it.". The band were motivated by the poor reception of Strictly Diesel to prove themselves when writing and recording their next album, The Height of Callousness (2000), which several critics saw as a triumph over their detractors from this period. The members of Spineshank would consider The Height of Callousness to be the band's true debut album, as they had not established a musical identity on Strictly Diesel; Sarkisyan would later call the album a "glorified demo".

Despite this, the members of Spineshank felt that Strictly Diesel was important in shaping the band's future musical output. Santos believed that The Height of Callousness "would not have been possible without [Strictly Diesel]". Sarkisyan also felt that "A lot of good things came out of [the album] [sonically]", and that it "didn't get a fair shot" upon its release. Decker credited Derakh for introducing him to electronic drum pads to trigger samples during the album's recording, which would become integral to his drumming technique. There have also been some positive reassessments of the album; Metal Hammer included Strictly Diesel in their list of "The Top 10 Essential Nu Metal Albums" in 2016, praising the album's songwriting and Santos' vocals. Revolver also included the album in their list of "20 Essential Nu-Metal Albums" in 2021, calling it "largely overlooked".

== Track listing ==
All lyrics are written by Jonny Santos and Tom Decker, except "While My Guitar Gently Weeps" written by George Harrison.

No.	Title	Music	Length
1.	"Intake"	Spineshank; Josh Abraham	2:47
2.	"Stovebolt"	Spineshank; Abraham	3:02
3.	"Shinebox"	Spineshank	3:07
4.	"Where We Fall"	Spineshank	3:31
5.	"Detached"	Spineshank	3:22
6.	"Slipper"	Spineshank	4:16
7.	"40 Below"	Spineshank; Abraham	3:22
8.	"Strictly Diesel"	Spineshank; Abraham	3:10
9.	"Grey"	Spineshank	3:30
10.	"*28"	Spineshank	4:00
11.	"While My Guitar Gently Weeps" (The Beatles cover)	George Harrison	4:02
12.	"If It Breathes"	Spineshank; Abraham	3:07
13.	"Mend"	Spineshank; Abraham	3:05
14.	"Stain (Start the Machine)"	Spineshank; Abraham	3:21
Total length:			47:43

== Personnel ==
Personnel per liner notes.

Spineshank
- Jonny Santos – lead vocals
- Mike Sarkisyan – guitars, sitar, screaming (10)
- Robert Garcia – bass, backing vocals
- Tommy Decker – drums, electronics, backing vocals

Additional personnel

- Josh Abraham – programming, loops
- Amir Derakh – synth guitar (11)
- Chris Thompson – additional guitar (14)
- Burton C. Bell – guest vocals (14)
Production
- Jay Baumgardner – production, engineering, mixing (at NRG)
- Amir Derakh – production, engineering, mixing (at NRG)
- Steve Mixdorf – assistant mix engineer
- Derek Carlson – additional engineering
- Ulyssees Noriega – additional engineering
- George Marino – mastering (at Sterling Sound)

Artwork

- Kevin Estrada – photography
- Smay Vision – design
- Linda Kusnetz – creative direction

== Chart positions ==
Chart (1998)	Peak position
UK Albums (OCC)	129
UK Rock & Metal Albums (OCC)	7

== Release history ==
Release history for Strictly Diesel
Region	Label	Format	Date	Catalog #	Ref.
United States	Roadrunner	CD; cassette	September 22, 1998	RR 8725-2	
Europe	Roadrunner	CD; cassette	September 28, 1998	RR 8725-2	
Various	Music on Vinyl	LP	May 31, 2019	MOVLP2463	

== Bibliography ==
- Anon. (March 1999). "Shooting Stars". Hit Parader. No. 414. US: Magma Publishing Group. p. 70 – via Internet Archive.
- Arnopp, Jason (July 25, 1998). "Brotherhood of Slam". Kerrang!. No. 709. UK: EMAP. p. 52.
- Ayers, Chris (April 16, 1999). "Four-band bill features old, new metal". The Herald. US. p. 10D.
- Fraser, Lewis (November 2000). "Reviews: Metal". Rock Sound. No. 18. UK: Freeway Press. p. 93.
- Griffiths, Mark (September 19, 1998). "Albums". Kerrang!. No. 717. UK: EMAP. p. 46.
- Ingham, Chris (February 2001). "Growing Up is Hard to Do". Metal Hammer. No. 83. UK: Future plc. pp. 64–66.
- Ingham, Chris (2002). "Spineshank". The Book of Metal. UK: London : Carlton. p. 208. ISBN 978-1-84222-683-4 – via Internet Archive.
- Karpe, Matt (2021). "Spineshank". Nu Metal: A Definitive Guide. UK: Sonicbond Publishing. pp. 153–159. ISBN 978-1-78952-063-7.
- Kulkarni, Neil (October 2000). "The Spineshank Redemption". Metal Hammer. No. 79. UK: Future plc. pp. 32–33.
- Larkin, Colin, ed. (2006). "Spineshank". The encyclopedia of popular music (4th ed.). New York : MUZE : Oxford University Press. pp. 662–663. ISBN 978-0-19-531373-4 – via Internet Archive.
- Popoff, Martin (2007). The Collector's Guide to Heavy Metal: Volume 3: The Nineties. Burlington, Ontario, Canada: Collector's Guide Publishing. p. 420. ISBN 978-1-894959-62-9.
- Savio, Amanda (November 23, 2000). "Aggressive Spineshank finds their calling | A complete guide..." Record-Journal. US. pp. A3.
- Sheils, Liam (October 7, 2000). "Albums". Kerrang!. No. 822. UK: EMAP. p. 45.
- Sindell, Joshua (October 4, 1997). "Brand New Heavies". Kerrang!. No. 668. UK: EMAP. p. 42.
- Sindell, Joshua (October 3, 1998). "Diesel Power". Kerrang!. No. 719. UK: EMAP. p. 24.
- Sindell, Joshua (October 7, 2000). "A New Level". Kerrang!. No. 822. UK: EMAP. pp. 20–21.
- Udo, Tommy (2002). "Spineshank". Brave Nu World. London : Sanctuary. pp. 159–163. ISBN 978-1-86074-415-0 – via Internet Archive.
- Winwood, Ian (July 28, 2001). "Leap of Faith". Kerrang!. No. 863. UK: EMAP. pp. 18–20.
- Wonsiewicz, Steve (October 10, 2000). "Organic Growth at Rock for Spineshank" (PDF). R&R (1373). US: 41 – via worldradiohistory.com.
