= Methods of Mayhem (album) =

Studio album by Methods of Mayhem
- Released: December 7, 1999
- Recorded: 1999 (Los Angeles, California)
- Genres: Rap rock; rap metal; nu metal
- Length: 45:23
- Label: MCA
- Producer: Scott Humphrey

Methods of Mayhem chronology
Methods of Mayhem (1999)	A Public Disservice Announcement (2010)

Singles from Methods Of Mayhem
- 1. "Get Naked" Released: October 18, 1999; 2. "New Skin" Released: March 6, 2000

Methods of Mayhem is the 1999 debut album by American rock band Methods of Mayhem. It was Tommy Lee's first album since leaving Mötley Crüe earlier that year. The album was certified Gold by the RIAA and received generally positive reviews from critics.

== Background ==
Former Mötley Crüe drummer Tommy Lee's new musical venture, Methods of Mayhem, arose from his collaboration with rapper TiLo. Sparked by pent-up frustration resulting from jail stints, run-ins with the law, and tabloid reporters, Lee pulled together numerous stars from the worlds of rock and hip-hop.

Additional personnel include: George Clinton, Kid Rock, Lil' Kim, The Crystal Method, Snoop Dogg, Fred Durst and Mix Master Mike.

It is an enhanced audio CD which contains regular audio tracks and multimedia computer files. The album booklet "ill-ustrations" features the artwork of Derek Hess.

"Get Naked" and "New Skin" were released as singles for the album.

The supporting tour for the album featured Stephen Perkins (Jane's Addiction) on drums.

"Crash" was featured in the video games Gran Turismo 3: A-Spec, Crazy Taxi 2 (both which were edited to censor profanity), and NFL Blitz 2002, along with the riff to "Who The Hell Cares", as well as being in the theatrical trailer for the film Driven.

"Hypocritical" was featured in the video game Dave Mirra Freestyle BMX 2 and the game Motor Mayhem.

== Critical reception ==
Professional ratings
Review scores
Source	Rating
AllMusic	3/5 stars
Alternative Press	4/5 stars
Entertainment Weekly	B−
Kerrang!	3/5 stars
NME	6/10 stars
Q	3/5 stars

- Entertainment Weekly (1/7/2000, p. 68) – "Most of this rap-metal is surprisingly legit – and cameos by Lil' Kim, Fred Durst, and Kid Rock don't hurt." – Rating: B−
- Q magazine (4/2000, p. 96) – 3 stars out of 5 – "...big, thumping, sweary, contemporary noise. Lee is entirely serious; he has the group's name tattooed on his arse cheeks..."
- Alternative Press (3/2000, p .86) – 4 out of 5 – "...armed to the teeth with special guests, hopping between metal-edged techno and radio-minded hard rock. The surprise: It ain't bad, and a few of these tunes are 'really good'..."
- CMJ (December 27, 1999, p. 5) – "...brass-knuckled, rhythmically dense, rap-rock....owing more to pop-industrial music and Bomb Squad production than it does to Fred Durst....one of 1999's grittiest, most heartfelt rap-rock albums..."
- Vibe (2/2000, p. 160) – "...combines heavy guitar riffs with insolent B-boy wordplay....As an exercise in funky head-banging, MAYHEM isn't half bad....producer, Scott Humphrey manages to mix up [Tommy] Lee's limited palette just enough to keep you tuned in..."
- NME (February 14, 2000, p. 41) – 6 out of 10 – "...contains more than enough of the mysterious kick-ass factor....successfully [mixing] hip-hop beats with some exceedingly heavy guitar riffing..."

== Track listing ==
No.	Title	Lyrics	Music	Length
1.	"Who the Hell Cares"	Tommy Lee, TiLo, Snoop Dogg	Tommy Lee, TiLo, Kai Marcus, Randy Jackson	3:32
2.	"Hypocritical"	Tommy Lee, TiLo	Tommy Lee, TiLo, Phil X, Randy Jackson	3:55
3.	"Anger Management"	Tommy Lee, TiLo	Tommy Lee, TiLo, Danny Lohner, Randy Jackson	3:14
4.	"Get Naked"	Tommy Lee, TiLo, Fred Durst, Lil Kim, Mix Master Mike, George Clinton	Tommy Lee, TiLo, Ken Andrews, Chris Chaney, Mix Master Mike	3:22
5.	"New Skin"	Tommy Lee, TiLo, Kid Rock	Tommy Lee, TiLo, Scott Phaff, Chris Chaney	4:34
6.	"Proposition Fuck You"	Tommy Lee, TiLo, Dutch, Filthee, Mike Nunez	Tommy Lee, TiLo, F.I.L.T.H.E.E Immigrants	3:12
7.	"Crash"	Tommy Lee	Tommy Lee, TiLo, Phil X, Randy Jackson	3:21
8.	"Metamorphosis"	Tommy Lee, TiLo	Tommy Lee, TiLo, Phil X, Randy Jackson	4:41
9.	"Narcotic"	Scott Kirkland, Tommy Lee	Tommy Lee, TiLo, The Crystal Method	3:19
10.	"Mr. Onsomeothershits"	U-God	Tommy Lee, Phil X, Chris Chaney, U-God	0:39
11.	"Spun"	Scott Kirkland	Tommy Lee, TiLo, The Crystal Method	5:03
Total length:				38:51

Enhanced CD bonus tracks
No.	Title	Length
1.	"Get Naked" (music video)	3:24
2.	"Making of 'Get Naked'" (video)	3:08
Total length:		45:23

== Personnel ==
- Tommy Lee – vocals, guitar, drums, percussion
- TiLo – vocals
- Kai Marcus – guitar
- Phil X – guitar
- Danny Lohner – guitar
- Ken Andrews – guitar
- Scott Phaff – guitar
- Randy Jackson – bass
- Chris Chaney – bass
- Audrey Wiechman – bass

=== Additional musicians ===
- Snoop Dogg – vocals on "Who the Hell Cares"
- Kid Rock – vocals on "New Skin"
- Fred Durst – vocals on "Get Naked"
- Lil' Kim – vocals on "Get Naked"
- George Clinton – vocals on "Get Naked"
- Mix Master Mike – turntables on "Get Naked"
- U-God – vocals on "Mr. Onsomeothershits"
- Scott Kirkland – keyboards on "Narcotic" and "Spun"
- F.I.L.T.H.E.E. Immigrants – vocals on "Proposition Fuck You"
- DJ Bobby B – turntables / scratching

== Charts ==
Chart (2000)	Peak position
Austrian Albums (Ö3 Austria)	32
Canada Top Albums/CDs (RPM)	31
German Albums (Offizielle Top 100)	93
UK Rock & Metal Albums (Official Charts)	9
US Billboard 200	71

== Certifications ==
Region	Certification	Certified units/sales
United States (RIAA)	Gold	500,000^{^}
^{^} Shipments figures based on certification alone.
