= Self-Destructive Pattern =

2003 studio album by Spineshank

Studio album by Spineshank
- Released: September 9, 2003
- Recorded: 2002–2003
- Studios: Henson Recording Studios (Hollywood, Los Angeles); Larrabee Sound Studios (Los Angeles, California); Cello Studios (Hollywood, Los Angeles); The Chop Shop Studios (Los Angeles, California); NRG Recording Studios (North Hollywood, Los Angeles); PMS Recording Studios (Gibsons, Canada)
- Genres: Nu metal; industrial metal
- Length: 40:31
- Label: Roadrunner
- Producers: GGGarth, Mike Sarkisyan, Tommy Decker

Spineshank chronology
The Height of Callousness (2000)	Self-Destructive Pattern (2003)	Anger Denial Acceptance (2012)

Singles from Self-Destructive Pattern
- 1. "Smothered" Released: October 2003

Professional ratings
Review scores
Source	Rating
AllMusic	2.5/5 stars
Collector's Guide to Heavy Metal	8/10
The Encyclopedia of Popular Music	3/5 stars
Kerrang!	4/5 stars
laut.de	4/5 stars
Metal.de	6/10
Sputnikmusic	4/5 stars
Terrorizer	8/10

Self-Destructive Pattern is the third studio album by American metal band Spineshank, released on September 9, 2003, through Roadrunner Records. The single "Smothered" was nominated for a Grammy in the category of Best Metal Performance (2004).

== Track listing ==
All lyrics by Tommy Decker and Jonny Santos. All music by Tommy Decker and Mike Sarkisyan.

No.	Title	Length
1.	"Violent Mood Swings"	3:29
2.	"Slavery"	2:55
3.	"Smothered"	3:07
4.	"Consumed (Obsessive Compulsive)"	3:06
5.	"Beginning of the End"	3:32
6.	"Forgotten"	3:19
7.	"Self-Destructive Pattern"	3:16
8.	"Tear Me Down"	3:42
9.	"Stillborn"	4:15
10.	"Falls Apart"	2:56
11.	"Fallback"	3:15
12.	"Dead to Me"	3:36

B-sides
No.	Title	Length
13.	"Infected" (bonus track for Japanese edition, on streaming services)	4:15
14.	"On Deaf Ears" (appears on Roadrunner Roadrage 2003 sampler)	3:37
15.	"Don't Look Back" (appears on studio recording video in low quality)	3:20

== Personnel ==
=== Musicians ===
- Jonny Santos – lead vocals
- Mike Sarkisyan – guitars
- Robert Garcia – bass, backing vocals
- Tommy Decker – drums, electronics, programming

=== Credits ===
- GGGarth – production
- Tommy Decker – co-production, assistant digital editing
- Mike Sarkisyan – co-production, assistant digital editing
- Ted Jensen – mastering
- Frank Gryner – engineering, recording, additional programming
- Scott Humphrey – engineering, recording, additional programming
- Brad Kane – additional vocals
- Jay Baumgardner – mixing
- Mark Kiczula – assistant mixer
- Ben "Game Over" Kaplan – digital editing
- Jeff Rothschild – assistant digital editor
- Anthony "Fu" Valcic – assistant digital editor

== In other media ==
- The songs "Beginning of the End" and "Slavery" were featured in the 2003 film Freddy vs. Jason, but only "Beginning of the End" was featured on the soundtrack.
- The song "Smothered" was featured in the video game Backyard Wrestling: Don't Try This at Home.

== Charts ==
Chart performance for Self-Destructive Pattern
Chart (2003)	Peak position
Australian Albums (ARIA)	89
UK Albums (Official Charts)	83
US Billboard 200	89
