= Smothered (song) =

Single by Spineshank

from the album Self-Destructive Pattern
- Released: October 2003
- Genre: Nu metal
- Length: 3:07
- Label: Roadrunner
- Songwriter(s): Jonny Santos; Mike Sarkisyan; Tommy Decker
- Producer(s): GGGarth; Tommy Decker; Mike Sarkisyan

Spineshank singles chronology
"New Disease" (2001)	"Smothered" (2003)	"Nothing Left for Me" (2012)

"Smothered" is a single by American industrial metal band Spineshank. It was only released in the United States in CD format. The music video features the band performing in a room while they are filmed by numerous hidden cameras, which they find and destroy. The song was nominated for Best Metal Performance at the 46th Grammy Awards, but lost to Metallica's "St. Anger." The song "Smothered" was featured in the video game Backyard Wrestling: Don't Try This at Home.

== Track listing ==
Card sleeve single

No.	Title	Length
1.	"Smothered" (Single Mix)	2:34
2.	"Smothered" (Album Version)	3:07

Maxi single

No.	Title	Length
1.	"Smothered" (Single Mix)	2:34
2.	"Infected"	4:15
3.	"Violent Mood Swings" (Random Acts of Violence Mix)	3:23

== Personnel ==
- Jonny Santos – lead vocals
- Mike Sarkisyan – guitar
- Robert Garcia – bass, backing vocals
- Tommy Decker – drums, electronics
