= Methods of Mayhem =

American rap rock band

- Origin: Los Angeles, California, U.S.
- Genres: Rap rock; rap metal; nu metal
- Years active: 1999–2000; 2009–2011; 2019–present
- Labels: Roadrunner; MCA
- Members: Tommy Lee; John Allen III; DJ Aero; Marty O'Brien; Morgan Rose
- Past members: TiLo; Chris Chaney; Will Hunt; Stephen Perkins; Mix Master Mike; Kai Marcus

Methods of Mayhem is an American rap rock/metal band formed in 1999 by Tommy Lee, who had temporarily quit his position as Mötley Crüe's drummer.

== History ==
Lee formed Methods of Mayhem on the eve of his divorce from Pamela Anderson. The band's self-titled debut album was released in late 1999 and went on to be certified gold. The album featured appearances by Fred Durst, The Crystal Method, U-God, Kid Rock, Snoop Dogg, Lil' Kim, George Clinton and Mix Master Mike. "It's pretty good for what it is," Lee's former Mötley Crüe band member Nikki Sixx conceded in 2000, "I guess you'd call it rap-rock." The band disbanded for the first time in September 2000.

In March 2009, Lee announced that he was reforming Methods of Mayhem and would start recording new music. Drummer Will Hunt, guitarist J3, guitarist Phil X (who contributed to the first album), and touring bassist Marty O'Brien contributed to the sophomore album, A Public Disservice Announcement, released in September 2010. A live performance on The Tonight Show with Jay Leno saw Morgan Rose (of Sevendust) playing drums, DJ Aero on turntables, J3 on guitar and vocals, and Lee on vocals and guitar. No bass player was on stage during the performance. Methods of Mayhem later signed to Loud & Proud/Roadrunner Records.

On April 2, 2019, it was announced that Lee had resurrected the project and had plans to release a new album in the future.

== Style ==
The band's self-titled debut featured a rap metal style, while A Public Disservice Announcement was more varied in style, covering genres such as rap rock, nu metal and dance-rock.

== Band members ==
=== Current members ===
- Tommy Lee – lead vocals, rhythm guitar, drums (1999–2000, 2009–2011, 2019–present)
- DJ Aero – turntables, electronics (1999–2000, 2009–2011, 2019–present)
- Marty O'Brien – bass (2000, 2010–2011, 2019–present), synthesizer, backing vocals (2010–2011, 2019–present)
- John "J3" Allen III – lead guitar, co-lead vocals (2009–2011, 2019–present)
- Morgan Rose – drums (2010–2011, 2019–present)

=== Former members ===
- Stephen Perkins – drums (1999–2000)
- Will Hunt – drums (2009–2010)
- Tim "TiLo" Murray – vocals (1999–2000)
- Chris Chaney – bass (1999–2000, 2009–2010)
- Mix Master Mike – turntables (1999)
- Kai Marcus – lead guitar, backing vocals (1999–2000)

== Discography ==
| Year | Album details | Peak chart positions | | | Certifications |
| Year | Album details | US | AUT | GER | Certifications |
|---|---|---|---|---|---|
| 1999 | Methods of Mayhem: Released: December 7, 1999; Label: MCA | 71 | 32 | 93 | RIAA: Gold |
| 2010 | A Public Disservice Announcement: Released: September 21, 2010; Label: Roadrunner | 153 | — | — | |

=== Singles ===
- "Get Naked" (1999)
- "New Skin" (1999)
- "Fight Song" (2010)
- "Time Bomb" (2010)
