= Shaun Palmer's Pro Snowboarder =

2001 video game

- Developers: Dearsoft (PS2); ITL (GBC); Natsume Co., Ltd. (GBA)
- Publisher: Activision O2
- Platforms: PlayStation 2, Game Boy Color, Game Boy Advance
- Release: PlayStation 2, Game Boy Color: NA: November 13, 2001; EU: November 30, 2001; Game Boy Advance: EU: November 30, 2001; NA: December 4, 2001
- Genre: Snowboarding
- Modes: Single-player, multiplayer

Shaun Palmer's Pro Snowboarder is a 2001 snowboarding video game with a similar feel to the Tony Hawk's Pro Skater series. It was developed by Dear Soft and published by Activision under the Activision O2 label. The game features ten famous snowboarders, including Shaun Palmer, Ross Powers and Shaun White. A demo version of the game is available in the options menu of the PlayStation 2 version of Tony Hawk's Pro Skater 3. A sequel was in development by Treyarch, with a concurrent GBA version by Vicarious Visions, but was later cancelled.

== Development ==
The game was at first originally developed by UEP Systems, who developed the first Cool Boarders game on the PlayStation, but after UEP went bust, much of the team joined Dear Soft to finish the game there.

== Reception ==
Reception

Aggregate scores
Aggregator	Score		
Aggregator	GBA	GBC	PS2
GameRankings	61%	75%	68%
Metacritic	58/100	N/A	64/100

Review scores
Publication	Score		
Publication	GBA	GBC	PS2
AllGame	N/A	N/A	1.5/5
Electronic Gaming Monthly	N/A	N/A	6.33/10
Game Informer	6.75/10	N/A	8.25/10
GamePro	N/A	N/A	4/5
GameRevolution	N/A	N/A	C−
GameSpot	7.9/10	N/A	7.7/10
GameSpy	43%	N/A	N/A
IGN	4/10	N/A	3/10
Nintendo Power	2.4/5	N/A	N/A
Official U.S. PlayStation Magazine	N/A	N/A	2.5/5

The Game Boy Advance and PlayStation 2 versions received "mixed" reviews according to video game review aggregator Metacritic.

== Cancelled sequel ==
A sequel, Shaun Palmer's Pro Snowboarder 2, was announced, but cancelled prior to release in late 2003. It was one of the titles cancelled due to publisher Activision's poor financial performance that year.
