= Weird Tales of the Ramones =

Weird Tales of the Ramones 1975–1996

Compilation album by The Ramones
- Released: August 16, 2005
- Recorded: 1975–1996
- Genre: Punk rock
- Length: 218:50
- Label: Rhino/WEA
- Producers: Bill Inglot; Jeff White; Sophia Fields
- Compiler: Johnny Ramone

Ramones compilation album chronology
The Best of The Ramones (2004)	Weird Tales of the Ramones 1975–1996 (2005)	Greatest Hits (2006)

Professional ratings
Review scores
Source	Rating
AllMusic	4/5 stars
The Austin Chronicle	3.5/5 stars
Entertainment Weekly	A
Metro Times	(average)
Mojo	4/5 stars
The New York Times	(favorable)
Pitchfork Media	(9.6/10)
Robert Christgau	(mixed)
The Rolling Stone Album Guide	4/5 stars
Uncut	3/5 stars

Weird Tales of the Ramones 1975–1996 is a box set compilation by American punk band the Ramones, released on August 16, 2005, by Rhino Records. The set was compiled by Johnny Ramone and contains 85 songs on 3 CDs, plus a DVD containing the 1990 documentary Lifestyles of the Ramones. The latter features the Ramones' music videos up to 1990, interspersed with interview clips with the band members and other pop culture figures, and the DVD adds the band's post-1990 videos, including the MTV-banned version of "Substitute". The box set also contains a special oversize comic book, focusing on the legend of the band, written and illustrated by multiple contributors, a 3D pair of glasses and a postcard dedicated to Joey, Johnny and Dee Dee.

The cover art and title is an homage to EC Comics issues from the 1950s.

== Track listing ==
Disc 1
No.	Title	Writer(s)	Original release	Length
1.	"Blitzkrieg Bop"	Tommy Ramone, Dee Dee Ramone	Ramones, 1976	2:12
2.	"Beat on the Brat"	Joey Ramone	Ramones	2:32
3.	"Judy Is a Punk"	Joey	Ramones	1:30
4.	"I Wanna Be Your Boyfriend"	Tommy	Ramones	2:25
5.	"Loudmouth"	Dee Dee, Johnny Ramone	Ramones	2:14
6.	"53rd & 3rd"	Dee Dee	Ramones	2:20
7.	"Havana Affair"	Dee Dee, Johnny	Ramones	1:56
8.	"Now I Wanna Sniff Some Glue"	Dee Dee	Ramones	1:35
9.	"Glad to See You Go"	Dee Dee, Johnny	Leave Home, 1977	2:10
10.	"Gimme Gimme Shock Treatment"	Dee Dee, Johnny	Leave Home	1:40
11.	"I Remember You"	Joey	Leave Home	2:18
12.	"Carbona Not Glue"	Joey, Johnny, Dee Dee, Tommy	Leave Home	1:50
13.	"Oh, Oh, I Love Her So"	Joey	Leave Home	2:05
14.	"Swallow My Pride"	Joey, Dee Dee	Leave Home	2:03
15.	"Commando"	Dee Dee, Johnny	Leave Home	1:53
16.	"Pinhead"	Joey, Johnny, Dee Dee, Tommy	Leave Home	2:53
17.	"Sheena Is a Punk Rocker" (ABC Single Version)	Joey	Leave Home	2:47
18.	"I Don't Care" (Single Version)	Joey, Johnny, Dee Dee, Tommy	Rocket to Russia, 1977	1:37
19.	"Rockaway Beach"	Joey, Johnny, Dee Dee, Tommy	Rocket to Russia	2:05
20.	"Cretin Hop"	Joey, Johnny, Dee Dee, Tommy	Rocket to Russia	1:55
21.	"Here Today, Gone Tomorrow"	Joey, Johnny, Dee Dee, Tommy	Rocket to Russia	2:48
22.	"Teenage Lobotomy"	Joey, Johnny, Dee Dee, Tommy	Rocket to Russia	2:01
23.	"Slug" (Demo)	Joey	ROCKET TO RUSSIA EXPANDED	2:22
24.	"Surfin' Bird"	Alfred Frazier, John Harris, Carl White, Turner Wilson	Rocket to Russia	2:35
25.	"We're a Happy Family"	Joey, Johnny, Dee Dee, Tommy	Rocket to Russia	2:39
26.	"I Just Want to Have Something to Do"	Joey, Johnny, Dee Dee	Road to Ruin, 1978	2:41
27.	"I Wanted Everything"	Joey, Johnny, Dee Dee	Road to Ruin	3:14
28.	"Needles and Pins" (Remixed Single Version)	Sonny Bono, Jack Nitzsche	Road to Ruin	2:21
29.	"I Wanna Be Sedated"	Joey, Johnny, Dee Dee	Road to Ruin	2:29
30.	"Go Mental"	Joey, Johnny, Dee Dee	Road to Ruin	2:40
31.	"Don't Come Close"	Joey, Johnny, Dee Dee	Road to Ruin	2:44
32.	"I Don't Want You"	Joey, Johnny, Dee Dee	Road to Ruin	2:26
33.	"She's the One"	Joey, Johnny, Dee Dee	Road to Ruin	2:13
34.	"I'm Against It"	Joey, Johnny, Dee Dee	Road to Ruin	2:07

Disc 2
No.	Title	Writer(s)	Original release	Length
1.	"Rock 'n' Roll High School" (Ed Stasium Mix; Recorded 1978)	Joey, Johnny, Dee Dee	Ramones Mania, 1988	2:18
2.	"I Want You Around" (Ed Stasium Mix; Recorded 1978)	Joey, Johnny, Dee Dee	Hey! Ho! Let's Go: The Anthology, 1999	3:00
3.	"Do You Remember Rock 'n' Roll Radio?"	Joey, Johnny, Dee Dee	End of the Century, 1980	3:50
4.	"I'm Affected"	Joey, Johnny, Dee Dee	End of the Century	2:53
5.	"Danny Says"	Joey, Johnny, Dee Dee	End of the Century	3:05
6.	"The KKK Took My Baby Away"	Joey	Pleasant Dreams, 1981	2:31
7.	"You Sound Like You're Sick"	Dee Dee	Pleasant Dreams	2:41
8.	"She's a Sensation"	Joey	Pleasant Dreams	3:25
9.	"All's Quiet on the Eastern Front"	Dee Dee	Pleasant Dreams	2:12
10.	"Outsider"	Dee Dee	Subterranean Jungle, 1983	2:10
11.	"Highest Trails Above"	Dee Dee	Subterranean Jungle	2:09
12.	"Psycho Therapy"	Dee Dee, Johnny	Subterranean Jungle	2:34
13.	"Time Bomb"	Dee Dee	Subterranean Jungle	2:09
14.	"Mama's Boy"	Johnny, Dee Dee, Tommy	Too Tough to Die, 1984	2:09
15.	"I'm Not Afraid of Life"	Dee Dee	Too Tough to Die	3:12
16.	"Too Tough to Die"	Dee Dee	Too Tough to Die	2:37
17.	"Wart Hog"	Dee Dee, Johnny	Too Tough to Die	1:54
18.	"Howling at the Moon (Sha-La-La)"	Dee Dee	Too Tough to Die	4:06
19.	"Daytime Dilemma (Dangers of Love)"	Joey, Daniel Rey	Too Tough to Die	4:32
20.	"Endless Vacation"	Dee Dee, Johnny	Too Tough to Die	1:47
21.	"My Brain Is Hanging Upside Down (Bonzo Goes to Bitburg)" (UK 12-inch Version)	Joey, Dee Dee, Jean Beauvoir	Animal Boy, 1986	3:54
22.	"Somebody Put Something in My Drink"	Richie Ramone	Animal Boy	3:20
23.	"Animal Boy"	Dee Dee, Johnny	Animal Boy	1:49
24.	"I Don't Want to Live This Life (Anymore)"	Dee Dee	B-side of "Crummy Stuff" UK 12-inch single	3:28
25.	"Love Kills"	Dee Dee	Animal Boy	2:20
26.	"Something to Believe In" (Single Version)	Dee Dee, Beauvoir	Animal Boy	4:18

Disc 3
No.	Title	Writer(s)	Original release	Length
1.	"I Wanna Live"	Dee Dee, Rey	Halfway to Sanity, 1987	2:37
2.	"Bop 'Til You Drop"	Dee Dee, Johnny	Halfway to Sanity	2:12
3.	"I Lost My Mind"	Dee Dee, Johnny	Halfway to Sanity	1:33
4.	"Garden of Serenity"	Dee Dee, Rey	Halfway to Sanity	2:37
5.	"I Believe in Miracles"	Dee Dee, Rey	Brain Drain, 1989	3:20
6.	"Pet Sematary" (Single Version)	Dee Dee, Rey	Brain Drain	3:20
7.	"Punishment Fits the Crime"	Dee Dee, Richie Stotts	Brain Drain	3:05
8.	"Merry Christmas (I Don't Want to Fight Tonight)" (Single Version)	Joey	Brain Drain	2:04
9.	"Main Man"	Dee Dee, Rey	Mondo Bizarro, 1992	3:26
10.	"Strength to Endure"	Dee Dee, Rey	Mondo Bizarro	2:59
11.	"Poison Heart"	Dee Dee, Rey	Mondo Bizarro	4:02
12.	"I Won't Let It Happen"	Joey, Andy Shernoff	Mondo Bizarro	2:20
13.	"Censorshit"	Joey	Mondo Bizarro	3:07
14.	"Journey to the Center of the Mind"	Ted Nugent, Steve Farmer	Acid Eaters, 1993	2:51
15.	"7 and 7 Is"	Arthur Lee	Acid Eaters	1:51
16.	"When I Was Young"	Eric Burdon, John Weider, Vic Briggs, Danny McCulloch, Barry Jenkins	Acid Eaters	3:13
17.	"I Don't Wanna Grow Up"	Tom Waits, Kathleen Brennan	¡Adios Amigos!, 1995	2:45
18.	"Scattergun"	C. J. Ramone	¡Adios Amigos!	2:29
19.	"Makin' Monsters for My Friends"	Dee Dee, Rey	¡Adios Amigos!	2:35
20.	"The Crusher"	Dee Dee, Rey	¡Adios Amigos!	2:25
21.	"Spiderman"	Robert Harris, Paul Francis Webster	Saturday Morning: Cartoons' Greatest Hits, 1995	1:56
22.	"Life's a Gas"	Joey	¡Adios Amigos!	3:33
23.	"She Talks to Rainbows"	Joey	¡Adios Amigos!	3:13
24.	"Anyway You Want It"	Dave Clark	Greatest Hits Live, 1996	2:20
25.	"R.A.M.O.N.E.S." (Joey Ramone Vocal Version)	Ian Kilmister, Michael Burston, Phil Campbell, Phil Taylor	Greatest Hits Live	1:24

== DVD track listing ==
1. "Do You Remember Rock 'n' Roll Radio?"
2. "Rock 'n' Roll High School"
3. "We Want the Airwaves"
4. "Psycho Therapy"
5. "Time Has Come Today"
6. "Howling at the Moon (Sha-La-La)"
7. "Something to Believe In"
8. "I Wanna Live"
9. "I Wanna Be Sedated"
10. "Pet Sematary"
11. "Merry Christmas (I Don't Want to Fight Tonight)"
12. "I Believe in Miracles"
13. "Strength to Endure"
14. "Poison Heart"
15. "Substitute" (MTV banned version)
16. "I Don't Want to Grow Up"
17. "Spider-Man"
18. "Blitzkrieg Bop" (Live)

== Personnel ==
Ramones

- Johnny Ramone – guitar
- Joey Ramone – lead vocals
- Dee Dee Ramone – bass guitar
- Tommy Ramone – drums (disc 1: tracks 1–25)
- Marky Ramone – drums
- Richie Ramone – drums (disc 2: tracks 14–26; disc 3: tracks 1–4)
- C. J. Ramone – bass guitar (disc 3: tracks 9–25)

Technical

- Johnny Ramone – compiler
- Bill Inglot – box set producer, remastering
- Jeff White – box set producer
- Sophia Fields – DVD producer
- Dan Hersch – remastering
- Hugh Brown – art direction, design
- Sheryl Farber – art direction
- Steve Vance – art assistance
