= We're Outta Here! =

Live album by Ramones
- Released: November 18, 1997
- Recorded: August 6, 1996
- Venue: The Palace, Hollywood, California
- Genre: Punk rock
- Length: 64:11
- Label: Eagle Rock
- Producer: Daniel Rey

Ramones live album chronology
Greatest Hits Live (1996)	We're Outta Here! (1997)	You Don't Come Close (2001)

Professional ratings
Review scores
Source	Rating
Allmusic	2.5/5 stars

We're Outta Here! is the fourth and final live album by the American punk band the Ramones. It was released on November 18, 1997, through Eagle Rock Records.

== Background ==
The album was recorded for Billboard Live at The Palace in Los Angeles, California, on August 6, 1996, when the Ramones performed their final concert. The show featured several special guests, including former band member Dee Dee Ramone, as well as members of bands who were influenced by the Ramones, such as Lemmy from Motörhead, Eddie Vedder from Pearl Jam, Tim Armstrong and Lars Frederiksen of Rancid, and Chris Cornell and Ben Shepherd of Soundgarden. We're Outta Here! is the only album by the Ramones to receive a Parental Advisory sticker, due to vocalist Joey Ramone shouting out profanities during or in between songs.

== Track listing ==
No.	Title	Writer(s)	Length
1.	"Durango 95"	Johnny Ramone	1:26
2.	"Teenage Lobotomy"	Joey Ramone, Johnny Ramone, Dee Dee Ramone, Tommy Ramone	1:30
3.	"Psycho Therapy"	Johnny Ramone, Dee Dee Ramone	2:10
4.	"Blitzkrieg Bop"	Tommy Ramone, Dee Dee Ramone	1:36
5.	"Do You Remember Rock 'n' Roll Radio?"	Joey Ramone, Johnny Ramone, Dee Dee Ramone	3:00
6.	"I Believe in Miracles"	Dee Dee Ramone, Daniel Rey	2:41
7.	"Gimme Gimme Shock Treatment"	Dee Dee Ramone, Johnny Ramone	1:14
8.	"Rock 'n' Roll High School"	Johnny Ramone, Dee Dee Ramone, Joey Ramone	1:50
9.	"I Wanna Be Sedated"	Joey Ramone	2:04
10.	"Spider-Man"	Robert Harris, Paul Francis Webster	2:11
11.	"The KKK Took My Baby Away"	Joey Ramone	2:12
12.	"I Just Wanna Have Something to Do"	Joey Ramone, Johnny Ramone, Dee Dee Ramone	2:09
13.	"Commando"	Dee Dee Ramone, Johnny Ramone	1:21
14.	"Sheena Is a Punk Rocker"	Joey Ramone	1:46
15.	"Rockaway Beach"	Dee Dee Ramone	2:11
16.	"Pet Sematary"	Dee Dee Ramone, Daniel Rey	3:01
17.	"The Crusher"	Dee Dee Ramone, Daniel Rey	2:09
18.	"Love Kills"	Dee Dee Ramone, Johnny Ramone, Joey Ramone	1:58
19.	"Do You Wanna Dance?"	Bobby Freeman	1:28
20.	"Somebody Put Something in My Drink"	Richie Ramone	2:31
21.	"I Don't Want You"	Johnny Ramone, Dee Dee Ramone, Joey Ramone	2:01
22.	"Wart Hog"	Dee Dee Ramone, Johnny Ramone	1:33
23.	"Cretin Hop"	Joey Ramone, Johnny Ramone, Dee Dee Ramone, Tommy Ramone	1:22
24.	"R.A.M.O.N.E.S."	Würzel, Phil Campbell, Lemmy, Phil Taylor	1:17
25.	"Today Your Love, Tomorrow the World"	Dee Dee Ramone	1:40
26.	"Pinhead"	Joey Ramone, Johnny Ramone, Dee Dee Ramone, Tommy Ramone	2:57
27.	"53rd & 3rd"	Dee Dee Ramone	1:56
28.	"Listen to My Heart" (Mistitled "Listen To Your Heart")	Dee Dee Ramone	1:19
29.	"We're a Happy Family"	Joey Ramone, Johnny Ramone, Dee Dee Ramone, Tommy Ramone	1:59
30.	"Chinese Rock"	Dee Dee Ramone, Richard Hell	2:32
31.	"Beat on the Brat"	Joey Ramone	2:14
32.	"Anyway You Want It"	Dave Clark	3:12

== Personnel ==
Ramones

- C. J. Ramone – bass guitar; backing vocals; lead vocals on "The Crusher", "Wart Hog", and "R.A.M.O.N.E.S."
- Joey Ramone – lead vocals
- Johnny Ramone – guitar
- Marky Ramone – drums

Guest musicians

- Tim Armstrong – guitar on "53rd & 3rd"
- Lars Frederiksen – guitar and vocals on "53rd & 3rd"
- Lemmy Kilmister – bass guitar and vocals on "R.A.M.O.N.E.S."
- Dee Dee Ramone – lead vocals on "Love Kills"
- Ben Shepherd – guitar on "Chinese Rock"
- Eddie Vedder – vocals on "Anyway You Want It"
