= Lifestyles of the Ramones =

Video by Ramones
- Released: 1990
- Recorded: 1980–1989
- Genre: Punk rock
- Length: 57:00
- Label: Atlantic Records
- Producer: George Seminara

Ramones chronology
All the Stuff (And More!) Volume 2 (1990)	Lifestyles of the Ramones (1990)	Loco Live (1991)

Lifestyles of the Ramones is a VHS video by the American punk rock band Ramones, released in 1990 by Atlantic Records, featuring interviews and music videos. It was also released on DVD.

In 2005, it was re-released as part of the 4-disc box set Weird Tales of the Ramones, adding videos from 1992 to 1996, specifically the unreleased "Blitzkrieg Bop (Fast Live Version 1991)", an MTV-banned version of "Substitute" and the animated "Spiderman".

== Music videos ==
- "Do You Remember Rock 'n' Roll Radio?" (Directed by Mark Robinson, 1980)
- "Rock 'n' Roll High School" (Directed by Mark Robinson, 1980)
- "We Want the Airwaves" (Directed by Maureen Nappi, Craig Leibner & Kirk Heflin, 1981)
- "Psycho Therapy" (Directed by Frances Delia, 1983)
- "Time Has Come Today" (Directed by Schiro/Demyan, 1983)
- "Howlin' at the Moon (Sha-La-La)" (Directed by Frances Delia, 1984)
- "Something to Believe In" (Directed by Fischer & Preachman, 1986)
- "I Wanna Live" (Directed by Fischer & Preachman, 1987)
- "I Wanna Be Sedated" (Directed by Bill Fishman, 1988)
- "Pet Sematary" (Directed by Bill Fishman, 1989)
- "Merry Christmas (I Don't Want to Fight Tonight)" (Directed by George Seminara, 1989)
- "I Believe in Miracles" (Directed by George Seminara, 1990)

== Interviewees ==
- Joey Ramone
- Johnny Ramone
- Marky Ramone
- Tommy Erdelyi
- Ed Stasium
- Seymour Stein
- Tina Weymouth
- Vin Scelsa
- Chris Frantz
- Charlotte Lesher
- Scott Ian
- Denis McNamara
- Howie Klein
- Jim Bessman
- Dave Righetti
- Debbie Harry
- Rodney Bingenheimer
- Vernon Reid
- Chris Isaak
- Jean Beauvoir
- C. J. Ramone
- Jerry Harrison
- Monte Melnick
- Little Steven
- Daniel Rey
