= Loco Live =

Live album by Ramones
- Released: 1991
- Recorded: March 1991
- Venue: Sala Zeleste in Barcelona, Spain
- Genre: Punk rock
- Label: Chrysalis, Sire
- Producer: Ramones; Adam Yellin

Ramones live album chronology
It's Alive (1979)	Loco Live (1991)	Greatest Hits Live (1996)

Professional ratings
Review scores
Source	Rating
AllMusic	3/5 stars
The Rolling Stone Album Guide	3/5 stars

Loco Live is the second live album by American punk band the Ramones.

There are two different versions of Loco Live available. The 1991 Chrysalis version contains 33 songs, including "Too Tough to Die", "Don't Bust My Chops", "Palisades Park", and "Love Kills". The 1992 Sire version has different cover art and track order, and replaced these four tracks with "I Just Wanna Have Something to Do", "Havana Affair", "I Don't Wanna Go Down to the Basement", and an unlisted "Carbona Not Glue". The original tracks were recorded digitally at the Sala Zeleste in Barcelona, Spain on March 11–12, 1991, and overdubbed at Electric Lady Studios in NYC. This is the first Ramones album to feature C.J. Ramone.

== Track listing ==
All songs were written by the Ramones except where indicated. Credits have been given to specific members where applicable.

=== 1991 Chrysalis version (CD) Concert 11th March 1991 ===
No.	Title	Writer(s)	Length
1.	"The Good, the Bad and the Ugly"	Ennio Morricone	1:49
2.	"Durango 95"	Johnny Ramone	1:59
3.	"Teenage Lobotomy"		1:32
4.	"Psycho Therapy"	Dee Dee Ramone, Johnny Ramone	2:12
5.	"Blitzkrieg Bop"	Tommy Ramone, Dee Dee Ramone	1:44
6.	"Do You Remember Rock 'n' Roll Radio?"	Joey Ramone	2:59
7.	"I Believe in Miracles"	Dee Dee Ramone, Daniel Rey	2:51
8.	"Gimme Gimme Shock Treatment"	Johnny Ramone, Dee Dee Ramone	1:18
9.	"Rock 'n' Roll High School"	Joey Ramone, Johnny Ramone, Dee Dee Ramone	1:49
10.	"I Wanna Be Sedated"	Joey Ramone	2:09
11.	"The KKK Took My Baby Away"	Joey Ramone	2:41
12.	"I Wanna Live"	Dee Dee Ramone, Daniel Rey	2:19
13.	"My Brain is Hanging Upside Down (Bonzo Goes to Bitburg)"	Dee Dee Ramone, Jean Beauvoir, Joey Ramone	2:52
14.	"Too Tough to Die"	Dee Dee Ramone	2:15
15.	"Sheena is a Punk Rocker"	Joey Ramone	1:47
16.	"Rockaway Beach"	Dee Dee Ramone	2:03
17.	"Pet Sematary"	Dee Dee Ramone, Daniel Rey	2:56
18.	"Don't Bust My Chops"	Dee Dee Ramone, Joey Ramone, Daniel Rey	2:17
19.	"Palisades Park"	Chuck Barris	2:12
20.	"Mama's Boy"	Dee Dee Ramone, Johnny Ramone, Tommy Erdelyi	2:08
21.	"Animal Boy"	Dee Dee Ramone, Johnny Ramone	1:54
22.	"Wart Hog"	Dee Dee Ramone, Johnny Ramone	1:35
23.	"Surfin' Bird"	Al Frazier, Sonny Harris, Carl White, Turner Wilson	2:29
24.	"Cretin Hop"	Ramones	1:24
25.	"I Don't Wanna Walk Around with You"	Dee Dee Ramone	1:11
26.	"Today Your Love, Tomorrow the World"	Dee Dee Ramone	1:42
27.	"Pinhead"	Ramones	2:39
28.	"Somebody Put Something in My Drink"	Richie Ramone	2:37
29.	"Beat on the Brat"	Joey Ramone	2:14
30.	"Judy Is a Punk"	Dee Dee Ramone, Joey Ramone	1:55
31.	"Chinese Rocks"	Dee Dee Ramone, Richard Hell	2:02
32.	"Love Kills"	Dee Dee Ramone	1:56
33.	"Ignorance is Bliss"	Joey Ramone, Andy Shernoff	3:11
Total length:			65:14

=== 1992 Sire version (CD) Concert 12th March 1991 (without "Don't Bust My Chops" and "Palisades Park") ===
No.	Title	Writer(s)	Length
1.	"The Good, the Bad and the Ugly"	Ennio Morricone	1:55
2.	"Durango 95"	Johnny Ramone	0:47
3.	"Teenage Lobotomy"		1:32
4.	"Psycho Therapy"	Dee Dee Ramone, Johnny Ramone	2:16
5.	"Blitzkrieg Bop"		1:44
6.	"Do You Remember Rock 'n' Roll Radio?"		2:59
7.	"I Believe in Miracles"	Dee Dee Ramone, Daniel Rey	2:51
8.	"Gimme Gimme Shock Treatment"		1:18
9.	"Rock and Roll High School"		1:49
10.	"I Wanna Be Sedated"		2:09
11.	"The KKK Took My Baby Away"	Joey Ramone	2:41
12.	"I Wanna Live"	Dee Dee Ramone, Daniel Rey	2:19
13.	"My Brain Is Hanging Upside Down (Bonzo Goes to Bitburg)"	Dee Dee Ramone, Jean Beauvoir, Joey Ramone	2:52
14.	"Chinese Rocks"		2:02
15.	"Sheena Is a Punk Rocker"		1:47
16.	"Rockaway Beach"		2:03
17.	"Pet Sematary" ("Carbona Not Glue" (The Ramones))	Dee Dee Ramone, Daniel Rey	4:16
18.	"Judy Is a Punk"		1:55
19.	"Mama's Boy"	Dee Dee Ramone, Johnny Ramone, Tommy Erdelyi	2:08
20.	"Animal Boy"	Dee Dee Ramone, Johnny Ramone	1:54
21.	"Wart Hog"	Dee Dee Ramone, Johnny Ramone	1:35
22.	"Surfin' Bird"	Al Frazier, Sonny Harris, Carl White, Turner Wilson	2:29
23.	"Cretin Hop"		1:24
24.	"I Don't Wanna Walk Around With You"		1:11
25.	"Today Your Love, Tomorrow the World"		1:42
26.	"Pinhead"		2:39
27.	"Somebody Put Something in My Drink"	Richie Ramone	2:37
28.	"Beat on the Brat"		2:14
29.	"Ignorance Is Bliss"	Joey Ramone, Andy Shernoff	3:31
30.	"I Just Wanna Have Something to Do (bonus track)"		2:15
31.	"Havana Affair (bonus track)"	Dee Dee Ramone, Johnny Ramone	1:21
32.	"I Don't Wanna Go Down To The Basement (bonus track)"	Dee Dee Ramone, Johnny Ramone	2:00
Total length:			63:15

=== 2010 Captain Oi! version (2xCD) ===
The Captain Oi! edition contains all of the songs from both versions.

Disc one
No.	Title	Writer(s)	Length
1.	"The Good, the Bad and the Ugly"	Ennio Morricone	1:49
2.	"Durango 95"	Johnny Ramone	0:48
3.	"Teenage Lobotomy"		1:32
4.	"Psycho Therapy"	Dee Dee Ramone, Johnny Ramone	1:57
5.	"Blitzkrieg Bop"		1:36
6.	"Do You Remember Rock 'n' Roll Radio?"		3:00
7.	"I Believe In Miracles"	Dee Dee Ramone, Daniel Rey	2:51
8.	"Gimme Gimme Shock Treatment"		1:13
9.	"Rock 'n' Roll High School"		1:51
10.	"I Wanna Be Sedated"		2:07
11.	"The KKK Took My Baby Away"	Joey Ramone	2:08
12.	"I Wanna Live"	Dee Dee Ramone, Daniel Rey	2:17
13.	"Bonzo Goes to Bitburg"	Dee Dee Ramone, Jean Beauvoir, Joey Ramone	2:51
14.	"Too Tough To Die"	Dee Dee Ramone	2:14
15.	"Sheena Is a Punk Rocker"		1:46
16.	"Rockaway Beach"		1:31
17.	"Pet Sematary"	Dee Dee Ramone, Daniel Rey	2:57
18.	"Carbona Not Glue"		1:19
19.	"Don't Bust My Chops"	Dee Dee Ramone, Joey Ramone, Daniel Rey	2:18
20.	"Palisades Park"	Chuck Barris	1:53
Total length:			39:58

Disc two
No.	Title	Writer(s)	Length
21.	"Mama's Boy"	Dee Dee Ramone, Johnny Ramone, Tommy Erdelyi	1:56
22.	"Animal Boy"	Dee Dee Ramone, Johnny Ramone	1:58
23.	"Wart Hog"	Dee Dee Ramone, Johnny Ramone	1:33
24.	"Surfin' Bird"	Al Frazier, Sonny Harris, Carl White, Turner Wilson	2:33
25.	"Cretin Hop"		1:25
26.	"I Don't Wanna Walk Around With You"		1:12
27.	"Today Your Love, Tomorrow The World"		1:39
28.	"Pinhead"		1:55
29.	"Somebody Put Something in My Drink"	Richie Ramone	2:35
30.	"Beat on the Brat"		2:13
31.	"Judy Is a Punk"		1:07
32.	"Chinese Rocks"		2:01
33.	"Love Kills"	Dee Dee Ramone	1:54
34.	"Ignorance Is Bliss"	Joey Ramone, Andy Shernoff	2:34
35.	"I Just Wanna Have Something to Do"		2:16
36.	"Havana Affair"	Dee Dee Ramone, Johnny Ramone	1:22
37.	"I Don´t Wanna Go Down To The Basement"	Dee Dee Ramone, Johnny Ramone	2:00
Total length:			32:13

== Personnel ==
Ramones

- Joey Ramone - lead vocals
- Johnny Ramone - guitar
- C. J. Ramone - bass, backing vocals, lead vocals on "Wart Hog" and "Love Kills"
- Marky Ramone - drums

Production

- Hal Belknap - mixing assistant
- George Bodnar - photography
- Shannon Carr - mixing assistant
- Debbie Harry - liner notes
- John Heiden - design
- Arturo Vega - artwork, design, photography
- Howie Weinberg - mastering
- Jeff Wormley - assistant engineer
- Adam Yellin - recording, mixing, producer

== Charts ==
Chart (1991)	Peak position
Finnish Albums (The Official Finnish Charts)	31

Chart (2025)	Peak position
Croatian International Albums (HDU)	26
Hungarian Physical Albums (MAHASZ)	27
