= Durango 95 (song) =

Song by The Ramones

from the album Too Tough to Die
- Released: October 1984
- Recorded: July 1984
- Genre: Punk rock
- Length: 0:55
- Label: Sire
- Composer: Johnny Ramone
- Producers: Tommy Ramone, Ed Stasium

"Durango 95" is a short instrumental by the punk rock band the Ramones. It is the fourth track on their eighth studio album Too Tough to Die. The song is a cultural reference to the car driven by Malcolm McDowell's character in the 1971 film A Clockwork Orange. The cover of the Too Tough to Die LP recalled a scene in the film. The track is also the only instrumental piece that the band ever recorded.

== Composition ==
"Durango 95" is a three-chord song with the bass playing the root notes. The drum style is quite complicated for a punk rock song due to the cymbal crashes and 7/4 time signature used in the tune's second section. The song is the shortest of all of the album's tracks, and the shortest in the band's discography. It was made an instrumental essentially to fulfill the cultural reference that Johnny Ramone wanted to give it.

== Live shows ==
After releasing Too Tough To Die, the Ramones started most of their shows with "The Good, The Bad, and The Ugly" theme song in a slow crescendo. At its climax, they would start playing "Durango 95". This is shown in the Loco Live, Greatest Hits Live and We're Outta Here! live albums, released respectively in 1991, in 1996 and in 1997. "Durango 95" was replaced as a set opener only occasionally in the late '80s with a nearly instrumental version of "Eat That Rat".
