= NYC 1978 =

Live album by Ramones
- Released: August 19, 2003
- Recorded: January 7, 1978
- Genre: Punk rock
- Length: 55:39
- Label: King Biscuit Flower Hour Records

Ramones live album chronology
You Don't Come Close (2001)	NYC 1978 (2003)	Live On Air (2011)

Professional ratings
Review scores
Source	Rating
AllMusic	4.5/5 stars
Pitchfork Media	(7.3/10)
The Rolling Stone Album Guide	3.5/5 stars

NYC 1978 is a live album by American punk rock band, the Ramones.

== Background ==
The performance was recorded January 7, 1978, near Union Square at the Palladium as part of the King Biscuit Flower Hour Archive Series. This is the last commercially recorded performance with Tommy Ramone as the Ramones' drummer. He left the band soon afterwards, although he continued to work with the other members as a producer and manager until 2014.

25 years after the recording was created, King Biscuit Flower Hour Records released the material as an album on CD to the US markets on August 19, 2003, as "NYC 1978". One year later, the same material as an album on CD was released to the UK and European markets by Sanctuary Records on February 23, 2004 with alternative cover art and title: "Live, January 7, 1978 At The Palladium, NYC".

== Track listing ==
1. "Rockaway Beach" – 2:20
2. "Teenage Lobotomy" – 2:04
3. "Blitzkrieg Bop" – 2:05
4. "I Wanna Be Well" – 2:21
5. "Glad to See You Go" – 1:51
6. "Gimme Gimme Shock Treatment" – 1:31
7. "You're Gonna Kill That Girl" – 2:32
8. "I Don't Care" – 1:45
9. "Sheena Is a Punk Rocker" – 2:17
10. "Havana Affair" – 1:35
11. "Commando" – 1:45
12. "Here Today, Gone Tomorrow" – 3:13
13. "Surfin' Bird" – 2:19
14. "Cretin Hop" – 1:45
15. "Listen to My Heart" – 1:38
16. "California Sun" – 1:47
17. "I Don't Wanna Walk Around with You" – 1:22
18. "Pinhead" – 2:52
19. "Do You Wanna Dance?" – 1:40
20. "Chainsaw" – 1:28
21. "Today Your Love, Tomorrow the World" – 3:13
22. "Now I Wanna Be a Good Boy" – 2:01
23. "Suzy is a Headbanger" – 1:54
24. "Let's Dance" – 3:06
25. "Oh, Oh, I Love Her So" – 1:41
26. "Now I Wanna Sniff Some Glue" – 1:20
27. "We're a Happy Family" – 2:13

Credits

- Bass and backing vocals: Dee Dee Ramone
- Lead vocals: Joey Ramone
- Guitar: Johnny Ramone
- Drums: Tommy Ramone
- Cover Artwork Design – Dave Bias
- Executive Producer – Kevin Cain, Steven Ship
- Liner Notes – Kurt Loder
- Mixed by, Mastered by – Glen Robinson
- Photography by – Bob Gruen, Paul Natkin
- Technical Consultants – Chris Barry, Jim Starace
- Written-By – D Colvin (tracks: 1 to 12, 14, 15, 17, 18, 20 to 23, 25 to 27), J Hyman (tracks: 1 to 12, 14, 15, 17, 18, 20 to 23, 25 to 27), J Cummings (tracks: 1 to 12, 14, 15, 17, 18, 20 to 23, 25 to 27), T Erdelyi (tracks: 1 to 12, 14, 15, 17, 18, 20 to 23, 25 to 27)
