= Greatest Hits Live (Ramones album) =

Live album by Ramones
- Released: June 18, 1996
- Recorded: February 29, 1996
- Venue: The Academy in New York City
- Genre: Punk rock
- Length: 37:39
- Label: Radioactive
- Producers: Daniel Rey (all tracks); Ed Stasium (1–16)

Ramones live album chronology
Loco Live (1991)	Greatest Hits Live (1996)	We're Outta Here! (1997)

Professional ratings
Review scores
Source	Rating
AllMusic	2.5/5 stars
Entertainment Weekly	B
The Rolling Stone Album Guide	2/5 stars

Greatest Hits Live is the third live album by the punk rock band the Ramones. It was released in 1996 on Radioactive Records.

== Background ==
The album was recorded at The Academy in New York City on February 29, 1996.

Its final two songs are bonus studio tracks that are covers, neither of which appeared on a Ramones album previously. "R.A.M.O.N.E.S." is originally by Motörhead, from the group's album 1916; the song was written as a tribute to the Ramones. The other is "Anyway You Want It", originally by the Dave Clark Five. Some editions do not feature the studio tracks. Two versions of the "R.A.M.O.N.E.S." cover song were recorded: one version that features Joey Ramone singing and another version that features C.J. Ramone singing, which had previously been released as a bonus track on some editions of ¡Adios Amigos!.

The album's packaging features still shots from the video of the band's cover of the Spider-Man theme song. More still shots are featured in the booklet. There are two pressings of the actual disc art of Greatest Hits Live. The main version features a yellow background with a drawing of the Statue of Liberty, and the other (mainly for international versions) features the band's emblem on a purple background, which also appears on the tray insert.

== Track listing ==
All tracks are written by Ramones, except where indicated.

No.	Title	Writer(s)	Length
1.	"Durango 95"	Johnny Ramone	1:31
2.	"Blitzkrieg Bop"		1:37
3.	"Do You Remember Rock 'n' Roll Radio?"		3:00
4.	"I Wanna Be Sedated"		2:07
5.	"Spider-Man"	Robert Harris, Paul Francis Webster	1:48
6.	"I Don't Want to Grow Up"	Kathleen Brennan, Tom Waits	2:24
7.	"Sheena Is a Punk Rocker"		1:46
8.	"Rockaway Beach"		1:31
9.	"Strength to Endure"	Dee Dee Ramone, Daniel Rey	2:41
10.	"Cretin Family"	Dee Dee Ramone, Daniel Rey	2:17
11.	"Do You Wanna Dance?"	Bobby Freeman	1:21
12.	"We're a Happy Family"		1:28
13.	"The Crusher"	Dee Dee Ramone, Daniel Rey	2:10
14.	"53rd & 3rd"		1:46
15.	"Beat on the Brat"		2:42
16.	"Pet Sematary"	Dee Dee Ramone, Daniel Rey	3:38
17.	"R.A.M.O.N.E.S." (Studio recording)	Würzel, Phil Campbell, Lemmy, Phil Taylor	1:27
18.	"Anyway You Want it" (Studio recording)	Dave Clark	2:25

Omitted tracks from show:

"Teenage Lobotomy"
"Psycho Therapy"
"I Believe in Miracles"
"Gimme Gimme Shock Treatment"
"Rock 'n' Roll High School"
"The KKK Took My Baby Away"
"Commando"
"Somebody Put Something in My Drink"
"California Sun"
"Wart Hog"
"Cretin Hop"
"R.A.M.O.N.E.S."
"Today Your Love, Tomorrow the World"
"Pinhead"
"I Just Want to Have Something to Do"
"Anyway You Want It"
"Love Kills"
"Chinese Rock"
"Havana Affair"

== Personnel ==
Ramones

- Joey Ramone – lead vocals
- Johnny Ramone – guitar
- C. J. Ramone – bass guitar, lead vocals on "Strength to Endure", "Cretin Family" and "The Crusher", co-lead vocals on "53rd & 3rd"
- Marky Ramone – drums

== Charts ==
Chart (1996)	Peak position
Canada Top Albums/CDs (RPM)	57
