= Gusano (disambiguation) =

Gusano is an insult that translates to worm from Spanish.

Gusano may also refer to:

- Los Gusanos, a band formed in 1992 by C. J. Ramone
- Gusanos, a clone project of Liero
- de gusano, a subtype of mezcal
