= You Don't Come Close =

EP by The Ramones
- Released: May 15, 2001
- Recorded: 1978
- Genre: Punk rock
- Length: 24:00
- Label: Dynamic Italy

Ramones live album chronology
We're Outta Here! (1997)	You Don't Come Close (2001)	NYC 1978 (2003)

Professional ratings
Review scores
Source	Rating
Allmusic	3/5 stars

You Don't Come Close is a live EP by the Ramones, recorded in 1978, and released in 2001. The songs were recorded live when the band played the television show Musikladen in Bremen, Germany. As a bonus, the disc includes a music video for "Rockaway Beach".

== Track listing ==
1. "Teenage Lobotomy"
2. "Blitzkrieg Bop"
3. "Don't Come Close"
4. "I Don't Care"
5. "She's the One"
6. "Sheena Is a Punk Rocker"
7. "Cretin Hop"
8. "Listen to My Heart"
9. "California Sun"
10. "I Don't Wanna Walk Around with You"
11. "Pinhead"
12. "Rockaway Beach" (bonus music video)
