= The KKK Took My Baby Away =

"The KKK Took My Baby Away!"
- Benelux picture sleeve

Single by Ramones

from the album Pleasant Dreams
- A-side: "We Want the Airwaves"
- Released: 1981
- Genre: Punk rock
- Length: 2:32
- Label: Sire
- Songwriter: Joey Ramone
- Producer: Graham Gouldman

Ramones singles chronology
"I Wanna Be Sedated" (1980)	"The KKK Took My Baby Away!" (1981)	"Bonzo Goes to Bitburg" (1985)

Music video
- "The KKK Took My Baby Away" (Live) on YouTube

"The KKK Took My Baby Away!!" is a song by the American punk rock band Ramones, released in 1981 through Sire Records. It was written by front man and lead vocalist Joey Ramone and appears on the band's sixth studio album Pleasant Dreams (1981).

The protagonist sings that his girlfriend has been kidnapped by the Ku Klux Klan on her way to Los Angeles for the holidays and pleads with the listener to call federal authorities to find out where she is and whether she is still alive.

In End of the Century: The Story of the Ramones, a documentary film about the Ramones, Ramones tour manager Monte Melnick stated that it seemed clear to him that Joey must have been obliquely referring to Johnny Ramone (who used to tease Joey for being Jewish) "stealing" away his girlfriend, Linda.

Joey's brother Mickey Leigh backed up this claim, explaining that the song was in response to Joey's girlfriend Linda being in a relationship with Johnny. It is said that Joey and Johnny never spoke again after the events.

Former Ramones drummer Marky Ramone claimed in a 2015 interview that the song was inspired by Joey's experience at a mental institution, in which he befriended Wilna, a black woman. Wilna and Joey began to date in the early 1970s until her parents’ objections to Wilna dating a Jewish man tore them apart.

Despite the controversy surrounding the song, Johnny Ramone wrote in his autobiography that "The KKK Took My Baby Away" was his favorite song in the Pleasant Dreams album. He also denied being racist or that it was about him, saying Joey wrote the song much earlier.

== Music ==
Like almost all Ramones songs, the time signature is 4/4. The song is in the key of G Major. It alternates two verses with a chorus; the second chorus is followed by a bridge, after which the first verse and the chorus are repeated with a change of key to A Major.

In the documentary End of the Century: The Story of the Ramones, Johnny Ramone states that the guitar riff of "The KKK Took My Baby Away" was inspired by the riff of Cheap Trick's "He's a Whore".
