= Any Way You Want It (Dave Clark Five song) =

"Anu Way You Want It"

Single by the Dave Clark Five

from the album Coast to Coast
- B-side: "Crying Over You"
- Released: October 1964
- Studio: Lansdowne, London
- Genre: Pop rock; beat; power pop
- Length: 2:29
- Label: Columbia
- Songwriter: Dave Clark
- Producer: Adrian Clark

The Dave Clark Five UK singles chronology
"Thinking of You Baby" (1964)	"Anu Way You Want It" (1964)	"Everybody Knows (I Still Love You)" (1965)

The Dave Clark Five US singles chronology
"Everybody Knows (I Still Love You)" (1964)	"Any Way You Want It" (1965)	"Come Home" (1965)

Official audio
- "Any Way You Want It" on YouTube

"Any Way You Want It" is a single by the Dave Clark Five, from the United States album Coast to Coast (1964). "Any Way You Want It" was written by Dave Clark.

It hit number No. 25 in the UK Singles Chart, and No. 14 in the United States. It is notable for its use of echo and reverb made by an Echoplex. "Any Way You Want It" was performed on many US variety shows, such as The Ed Sullivan Show and Shindig!. As the song used many production techniques, it had to be lip synched on television performances.

Cash Box described it as "a 'pull-out-all-the-stops' powerhouse that the group pounds out in sales-dynamite fashion."

== Chart performance ==
Chart (1964–65)	Peak position
UK Singles (The Official Charts Company)	25
US Billboard Hot 100	14

== Cover versions ==
- The song was recorded by Kiss on the studio side of their second live album, Alive II (1977).
- Ramones recorded a studio version, which appears as a bonus track on their album Greatest Hits Live (1996). The song features C.J. Ramone as Joey Ramone's duet partner.
- It was the last song ever performed by the Ramones. Ramones, featuring Eddie Vedder of Pearl Jam as a guest vocalist, performed the song at their last show on August 6, 1996, at The Palace in Los Angeles. This version can be found on the band's last live album We're Outta Here! (1997).
- Tom Petty and the Heartbreakers include their version of the song on their career-spanning box set, The Live Anthology (2009), appearing on disc three out of four.
- A-Soma has recorded a version adding words and music of his own to render an alternative interpretation of this song with its ambiguous title (2020).

== Kiss personnel ==
- Paul Stanley – all guitars and bass, lead and backing vocals
- Peter Criss – drums
