= Danny Says =

- 1980 Australian 7" single disc

Single by Ramones

from the album End of the Century
- B-side: "Chinese Rock"
- Released: February 4, 1980
- Recorded: May 1979
- Length: 3:05
- Label: Sire
- Songwriter: Joey Ramone
- Producer: Phil Spector

Ramones singles chronology
"Baby, I Love You" (1980)	"Danny Says" (1980)	"Do You Remember Rock 'n' Roll Radio?" (1980)

"Danny Says" is a ballad written by Joey Ramone. The song was originally released as the third track on the Ramones' 1980 album, End of the Century. The 2002 Expanded Edition CD of the album includes a demo version of "Danny Says" among the bonus tracks. The song has since been covered and released by the Foo Fighters and Tom Waits.

== Background and content ==
"Danny Says" is a love song written by singer Joey Ramone at the Tropicana Motel in Los Angeles when the Ramones were staying there for the recording of End of the Century. The "Danny" alluded to in the title is the Ramones' manager Danny Fields.

The romantic inspiration for the song is believed to be Linda Daniele, Joey's girlfriend at the time. Later in Summer 1982 she ended her romantic involvement with Joey to extend her relationship with the band's guitarist Johnny Ramone who she moved in with in autumn that year. Although this virtually stopped dialogue between the two bandmates that was already limited since the time of recording End of the Century, both remained in the Ramones until the band disbanded in 1996.

== Lyrical references ==
At the time Joey was rooming with Arturo Vega in room 100 B of the Tropicana Motel on Santa Monica Boulevard in West Hollywood. Hence the line in the song, "Hanging out in 100 B". The lyrics include a reference to the late 1960s television series Get Smart ("Watching Get Smart on TV"). Another reference in the song is to Christmas, reflecting the difference at that time of year between where the band were recording in Los Angeles and the Ramones' home town of New York City - "It ain't Christmas if there ain't no snow". The lyrics also refer to a character named Sheena ("Listening to Sheena on the radio"). "Sheena Is a Punk Rocker" is a track on the 1977 Ramones album Rocket to Russia.

== Band member reaction ==
Johnny later commented on working with Phil Spector on the recording of the album, "It really worked when he got to a slower song like 'Danny Says'—the production really worked tremendously. For the harder stuff, it didn't work as well." When Joey was later asked what were his favorite Ramones songs he was quoted as replying, "'Danny Says' was always a favorite".

"Danny Says" has been performed live by each of Joey, C.J. and Richie in post Ramones projects.

== Cover versions ==
A cover version of the song with guitarist Chris Shiflett on lead vocals was released by the Foo Fighters as a B-side of the CD2 version of the "All My Life" single and later a bonus track on the Special Limited Edition of their 2002 One by One album. "Danny Says" was covered by Tom Waits and released on disk two of his Orphans triple album in 2006. Waits resided in the Tropicana Motel for many years where the Ramones stayed when End of the Century was recorded.
