= Chinese Rocks =

1975 song

"Chinese Rocks" or "Chinese Rock" is a song written in 1975 by New York punk rock musician Dee Dee Ramone with contributions from Richard Hell. Inspired by Lou Reed's "Heroin", the song openly details the day-to-day struggles of a heroin addict, and is based on Dee Dee's real-life experiences.

Authorship of the track is heavily disputed. Hell made several claims that it is his, though it is generally accepted as mostly Dee Dee's work. The song was first recorded by Hell's band the Heartbreakers, and later by Dee Dee's band the Ramones. The Ramones' recorded version and the version they initially performed at live shows changed the words "is Dee Dee home?" to "is Arty home?", although the earlier version was sometimes used after Dee Dee left the Ramones' lineup. In live performances, the Heartbreakers, but not the Ramones, also sometimes substituted sexual references for some of the mentions of "Chinese rocks".

== Origin ==
Hell and Dee Dee were in agreement that the song was mainly written by Dee Dee. "The reason I wrote that song was out of spite for Richard Hell, because he told me he was going to write a song better than Lou Reed's "Heroin", so I went home and wrote 'Chinese Rocks'," Dee Dee is quoted in Please Kill Me: The Uncensored Oral History of Punk. "I wrote it by myself, in Debbie Harry's apartment on First Avenue and First Street."

According to Dee Dee, the song was "about Jerry Nolan of the Heartbreakers calling me up to come over and go cop" heroin, a form of which was known in those days as 'Chinese Rocks'. "The line 'My girlfriend's crying in the shower stall' was about Connie, and the shower was at Arturo Vega's loft", where Dee Dee, his girlfriend Connie and Joey Ramone all lived at one point.

Dee Dee wanted to record the song with the Ramones, but Johnny Ramone vetoed it, considering it too obviously drug-related. Dee Dee then took it to Richard Hell, also with the Heartbreakers at the time. "Dee Dee called me one day and said, 'I wrote a song that the Ramones won't do,'" Hell recalled. "He said, 'It's not finished. How about I come over and show it to you and we can finish it if you like it?'"

According to Hell, "What happened is really clear, and the songwriting credits can all be checked at BMI. The song is by me and Dee Dee, but Dee Dee did 75 percent of it. I mean, all I did was write two verses out of three. Dee Dee wrote the music, the concept was his. He's basically responsible for it. But he brought me the song; he didn't even know Johnny and Jerry, but we were friends and he thought the band was great. And when the Ramones didn't want to do the song he said, 'Look, I've written one verse of this song with the chorus and it's about heroin, how about you write the rest of it and it's yours?'" And that's what he did." Dee Dee similarly recalled, "Richard Hell put that line in, so I gave him some credit."

== The Heartbreakers ==
"Chinese Rocks"

Song by Johnny Thunders and the Heartbreakers

from the album L.A.M.F.
- Released: October 3, 1977
- Recorded: March 1977
- Genre: Punk rock
- Label: Track (original album); Jungle (most reissues)
- Songwriter(s): Dee Dee Ramone, Richard Hell
- Producer(s): Speedy Keen, Daniel Segunda, Mike Thorne

There are differing recollections as to how the song became part of the Heartbreakers' repertoire. Richard Hell said, "I brought it to the next rehearsal, exactly as it was done by the Heartbreakers for all those years. I would sing it because it was a song I brought in." Dee Dee, on the other hand, wrote in his memoir, "When Jerry was over at my place one day, we did some dope and then I played him my song, and he took it with him to a Heartbreakers' rehearsal."

In either case, the song became one of the band's most popular songs. As Hell said, "After I left the Heartbreakers, they kept playing 'Chinese Rocks' and then ended up recording it" for the band's 1977 debut album, L.A.M.F.. "And they put all of their names on it, though nothing had changed about the song—they just added their names to it. Johnny Thunders... had nothing to do with 'Chinese Rocks' at all."

All vinyl pressings of L.A.M.F. credit the songwriters as Thunders, Heartbreakers' drummer Jerry Nolan as well as Ramone and Hell. It was only after the deaths of Thunders and Nolan that the credit was changed. However, both the 1994 and 2002 CD reissues of L.A.M.F. now name the three Ramones as the writers Joey, Johnny Ramone and Dee Dee—but not Hell.

"The credits are false," Dee Dee wrote in 1997. "Johnny Thunders ranked on me for fourteen years, trying to make out like he wrote the song. What a low-life maneuver by those guys!" The online databases for both ASCAP and BMI, however, credit the song to just Dee Dee Ramone and Hell. In the Heartbreakers' live performances of the song, Thunders would often change the lyrics to more explicit ones.

== The Ramones ==
"Chinese Rock"

Song by Ramones

from the album End of the Century
- A-side: "Danny Says"
- Released: February 4, 1980
- Recorded: May 1979
- Genre: Punk rock
- Length: 2:28
- Label: Sire
- Songwriter(s): Dee Dee Ramone, Richard Hell
- Producer(s): Phil Spector

On the Ramones' original recording of the song on their 1980 album End of the Century, the song is credited to "D.D.Ramone/R.Hell". It appears on later editions of End of the Century (vinyl repressings and CD releases) credited to the Ramones as a whole, with no mention of Hell.

The Ramones' version is called "Chinese Rock", with no s on the end. There is another slight lyrical difference between the versions: The Heartbreakers' lyrics begin, "Somebody called me on the phone/They said hey, is Dee Dee home", while the Ramones change "Dee Dee" to "Arty", an apparent reference to Arturo Vega, in whose loft the song is set. Vega was a long-time friend of the band and the designer of the Ramones' "presidential seal" logo. However, after Dee Dee left the band, Joey Ramone sometimes sang "Dee Dee" instead of "Arty" (as on the Ramones' 1991 live CD Loco Live).

Dee Dee Ramone stated in interviews that he felt proud of the song, it being one of his best-known tracks, but that the song became a "pain in the ass" for him as he repeatedly tried to get clean and was mistakenly regarded by many fans as a "heroin guru" promoting drug usage rather than just documenting it.
