= Linda Ramone =

Wife of Johnny Ramone

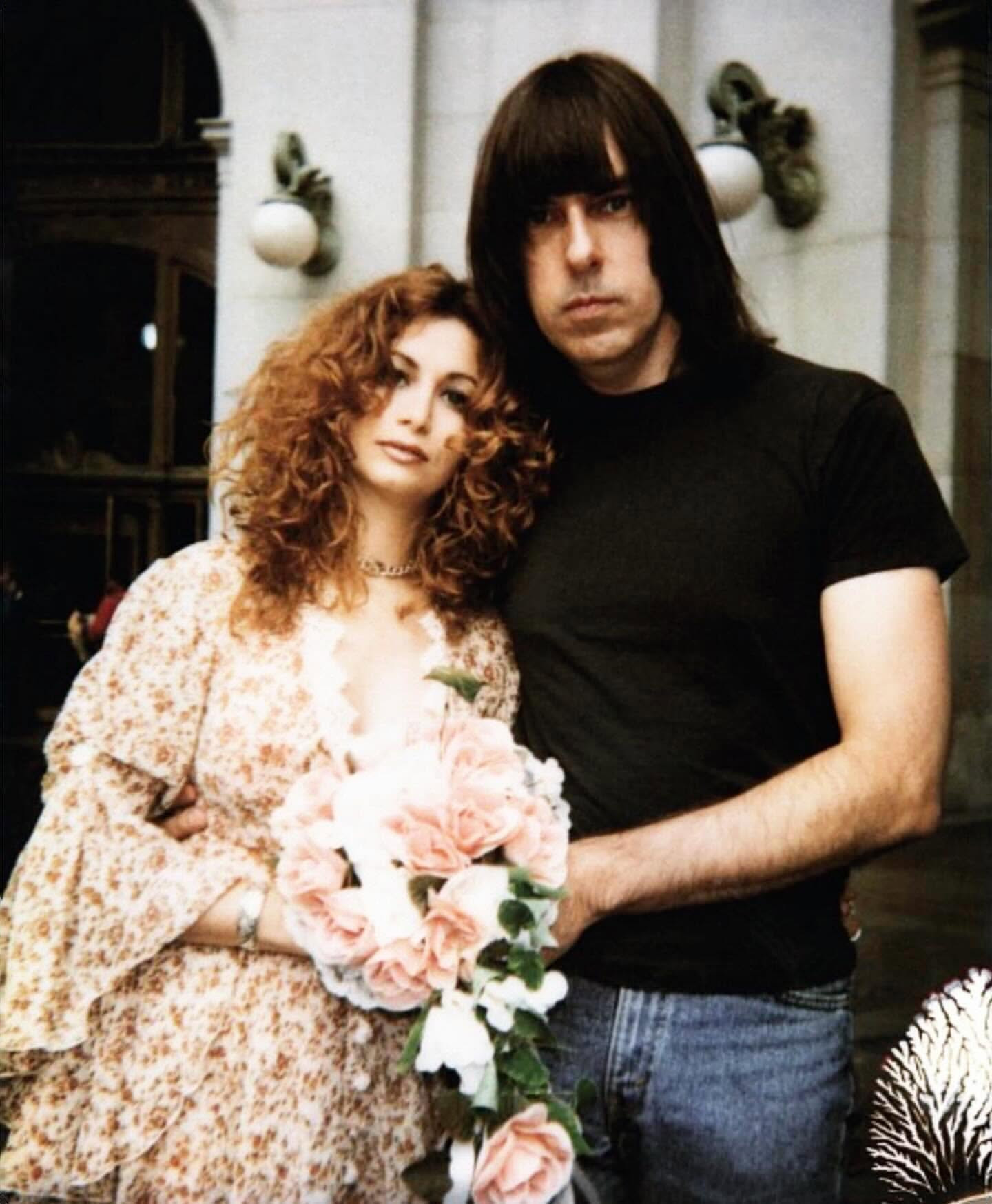
- Linda Ramone and Johnny Ramone
- Born: Linda Marie Daniele; July 24, 1960 (age 66); Rosedale, New York.
- Occupation: Philanthropist
- Spouse: Johnny Ramone (m. 1984; died 2004)
- Website: lindaramone.com

Linda Marie Daniele (born July 24, 1960), better known as Linda Ramone, is an American philanthropist and the widow of rock musician Johnny Ramone. She is the sole owner of Ramones Productions Inc., and was the subject of numerous songs by the Ramones, including "Danny Says" and "She's a Sensation". She is the founder and president of the Johnny Ramone Army, an organization acting on behalf of Johnny Ramone's estate, which holds live events and charity fundraisers, preserving his legacy.

== Early life ==
Ramone was born in Rosedale, New York.

== Relationship with the Ramones ==
Linda originally dated Joey Ramone but later dated and married Johnny Ramone. Stories conflict about whether Joey and Linda had broken up prior to Linda dating Johnny or if Linda left Joey for Johnny.

Johnny claimed that one of the first times he had met Linda was following the death of his father after being picked up from the airport. Despite the growing connection between Linda and Johnny, she became engaged to Joey in 1980. The relationship between Joey and Linda later came to an end following an argument between them regarding her relationship with Johnny.

Her relationship with Joey and Johnny was referred to as one of the Top 10 Love Triangles by Time magazine and one of the 10 Most Infamous Love Triangles in Music History by Complex magazine. Joey and Johnny continued to tour as the Ramones, even after Linda married Johnny.

Linda is the subject of numerous songs by the Ramones, including "She's a Sensation", "Danny Says", and "Merry Christmas (I Don't Want To Fight Tonight)". Just before Johnny's death in 2004, he and Linda supervised the erection of an eight-foot-tall bronze memorial of Johnny at the Hollywood Forever Cemetery in Los Angeles, California. Linda and Johnny were together for 20 years prior to his death.

In 2012, Linda released the book Commando, an autobiography written by Johnny Ramone. Linda did numerous television interviews to promote the release of the book.

== Philanthropy ==
Linda is the founder and president of the Johnny Ramone Army, an organization dedicated to preserving the legacy of Johnny Ramone. She also founded the Johnny and Linda Ramone Foundation. She organizes an annual event entitled the Johnny Ramone Tribute at Hollywood Forever to benefit the Johnny Ramone cancer research fund at the USC Westside cancer research center led by Dr. David Agus. The events have been attended by celebrities such as Lisa Marie Presley, Priscilla Presley, John Frusciante, Red Hot Chili Peppers, Chris Cornell, Eddie Vedder, Rob Zombie, Kirk Hammett, Steve Jones, and Traci Lords. Additional celebrities who have taken part in the events include John Waters, Rose McGowan, Henry Rollins, Joe Dallesandro, and Johnny Depp.

== Personal life ==
In 2017, Linda was named to Harper's Bazaar's list of the "150 Most Fashionable Women Now". In March 2017, she was credited as an inspiration for Gucci's new line, designed by creative director Alessandro Michele, featuring a "Hollywood Forever" Jacket.

She also appeared as herself in the season seven finale of Portlandia.

In a 2012 interview with Harper's Bazaar, she showed off the Los Angeles home that she had shared with Johnny Ramone. She now shares the home with her partner, J. D. King. She also revealed that she collects fashion, music, and movie memorabilia and maintains a museum-like house with an Elvis room, a Barbie room, a horror room, a Disney room, and a rock and roll room.

== Cited works ==
- Melnick, Monte (2007). On the Road With the Ramones. London: Bobcat Books. ISBN 978-0-85712-223-0.
- Leigh, Mickey (2009). I Slept with Joey Ramone: A Punk Rock Family Memoir. New York City: Touchstone. ISBN 978-0-7432-5216-4.
