= Los Gusanos =

Los Gusanos is a garage/rock/punk band formed in 1992 by Chris Ward (a.k.a. C. J. Ramone of the Ramones). The band began as a side project, but became a full-time job after the Ramones disbanded. Unlike his bassist role in Ramones, Ward sings lead and plays rhythm guitar. With Ward joined by "Dirty" Ed Lynch on lead guitar, "Big" John Chadwick on bass and Bo "Lefty" Matheson on drums, the band put out a few singles (including a cover of Ten Years After's "I'd Love To Change The World") before recording its self-titled debut album in 1997. Los Gusanos came out in Europe that year, and was released in the U.S. by Mayhem in 1998.

== Albums ==
All tracks are written by Los Gusanos except.

Los Gusanos (1993/1998)
No.	Title	Length
1.	"Bad Day"	2:58
2.	"Carve Your Name"	2:56
3.	"Hellodorado"	2:18
4.	"Strip"	4:13
5.	"Dead Man's Curve"	3:06
6.	"Blue Sky"	4:18
7.	"Burnin'"	1:45
8.	"Reciprocal"	3:35
9.	"Low"	3:26
10.	"Go Again"	2:42
11.	"Arizona"	3:28
12.	"On My Way"	4:18
