= Pleasant Dreams =

Studio album by the Ramones
- Released: July 20, 1981
- Recorded: March–April 1981
- Studios: Mediasound, New York City, USA; Strawberry North, Stockport, England; Strawberry South, Dorking, England
- Genres: Punk rock, hard rock, pop punk
- Length: 33:53
- Label: Sire
- Producer: Graham Gouldman

Ramones chronology
End of the Century (1980)	Pleasant Dreams (1981)	Subterranean Jungle (1983)

Singles from Pleasant Dreams
- 1. "We Want the Airwaves" Released: July 1981; 2. "She's a Sensation" Released: October 1981; 3. "The KKK Took My Baby Away" Released: November 1981 (Benelux only)

Pleasant Dreams is the sixth studio album by the American punk rock band Ramones, released on July 20, 1981, through Sire Records. While the band members wanted Steve Lillywhite to produce, Sire chose Graham Gouldman in an attempt to gain popularity with a well-known producer. The recording process brought about many conflicts between band members, most notably the strife between Joey Ramone and Johnny Ramone due to Johnny starting a relationship with Joey's girlfriend. There were also disputes about the overall direction of the album, with Johnny leaning towards hard rock and Joey towards pop punk. Ultimately, the album incorporated high production values and varying musical styles, straying from traditional punk rock on songs such as "We Want the Airwaves", "She's a Sensation" and "Come On Now". It is the first Ramones album not to feature any cover songs and their first that does not feature a picture of the band on the front cover.

Despite Sire's efforts to broaden the band's appeal by enlisting Gouldman to produce, the album was not commercially successful, peaking at No. 58 on the Billboard 200 and only charting outside of the US in Sweden. The album also met with mixed critical reception.

== Conception ==
The writing process for Pleasant Dreams began in January 1981. With Sire Records management being insistent on allowing a celebrity record producer to work on the album, they hired Graham Gouldman—songwriter and musician for the British band 10cc—to produce the album. Prior to working with Gouldman, the Ramones had recorded demos for the album with audio engineer Ed Stasium, and while the band had intended for Steve Lillywhite to produce the album, this decision was rejected by Sire. The studio recording process began on March 30, 1981, and initiated several conflicts between band members. This tension was partially due to Dee Dee Ramone's drug addiction, as well as Marky Ramone and Joey Ramone developing problems with alcohol, all frustrating Johnny Ramone. These conflicts and differences became evident in the songwriting as, for the first time on a Ramones album, each song was now credited to individual members rather than multiple members. However, Gouldman was unaware of these tensions during the recording of the album, describing the sessions as "very punctual and professional".

The time period of recording was a high point in musical style for both Joey and Johnny, though they directed their sound towards different styles of music: Joey's inspiration from pop music became evident in his writing, while Johnny's keenness for hard-rock guitar riffs are apparent in much of his performing on the album. Johnny thought that this did not benefit the band's sound, saying: "I knew going in that this was not going to be the type of album I wanted. It really could have used another two or three punk songs ... All I want to do is keep our fans happy and not sell out. I'm fighting within the band. They are trying to go lighter, looking for ways to be more commercial. I'm against the band for doing that." Joey countered by explaining: "By Road to Ruin [and] End of the Century, I was doing the majority of the songwriting. I started feeling that the Ramones were faceless; there were no individual identities in the band." Joey went on to say that while this method had worked well in the beginning of their career, it began to annoy him, since "everything [he] wrote, the band would take credit for."

Even though he expressed dissatisfaction with the album, working with Graham Gouldman, Johnny admitted, "was easy—he was always a gentleman. He changed a lot of the songs: "Here's a nice chord for the bridge, you should be playing a minor chord instead of a major chord," things like that." Gouldman also had ideas for vocal harmonies, guitar overdubs, and melodic basslines. If he suggested a guitar part, it had to sound like it came from Johnny, "or he wouldn't play it," Gouldman said. Gouldman also revealed that there were certain tracks he actually played guitar on. "I'd show [Johnny] and he'd say, "You play it," but I had to play very restrictive, nothing fancy at all." He went on to say that there wasn't much work to do with the songs. "We changed arrangements slightly, but it was basic stuff, like, "Let's put an end on this song rather than fade it, let's double up on the chorus at the end." Dee Dee recalled that "Graham really produced. He put something into the album, some harmony ideas." In a 2025 interview Gouldman stated that while the band (and Johnny in particular) disliked the album, "they never said anything while we were recording and we got on well".

During early stages of the album's development, Joey was dating Linda Daniele. After the album was released, however, Daniele left Joey and became Johnny's girlfriend. Ramones' road manager Monte Melnick relates: "Joey was devastated. It affected him deeply. Johnny knew it was bad and kept Linda totally hidden from that point on. She didn't come to many shows and if she did he'd hide her in the back; she wouldn't come backstage. He'd run out to meet her and leave as soon as they were done." While Johnny would eventually marry Linda, Joey held a strong grudge against them both, and while Johnny and Joey continued to perform and tour together, the two rarely talked to each other. Joey explained that Johnny had "crossed the line" once he started dating Daniele, and noted that "he destroyed the relationship and the band right there". Johnny defended himself by stating that had Daniele not left Joey for him, "he wouldn't have even been talking about her and saying how much he loved her because he wouldn't have been obsessed about it."

== Composition and lyrics ==
The album opens with "We Want the Airwaves", which has instrumentation that strays from traditional punk rock and more towards hard rock. Music journalist Chuck Eddy described the song as "a sort of Black Sabbath punk rock". Record World described "We Want the Airwaves" as a "brash rocker" that "[avoids] any subtlety". Though it was long rumored that the album's third track, "The KKK Took My Baby Away", was written about Johnny stealing Joey's girlfriend, the song was reportedly written some time before Joey had found out about this. Joey's brother Mickey Leigh relates: "The fluky connection between Johnny and the KKK raised a specter that keeps friends and fans speculating to this day. At the time, though, it had to be an unusual situation for him being that, as often happens with song lyrics, his words now took on a whole new meaning." The following track, "Don't Go", was described in Musician, Player, and Listener as "Spector-ish", likening the song's production values to those of music producer Phil Spector, the infamous producer of the band's previous record, End of the Century. According to the magazine, the lyrics detail "an archivist's sense of young love by the book and how innocent rock 'n' roll is supposed to sound." Everett True, author of Hey Ho Let's Go: The Story of the Ramones (2005), explains that the album's fifth track, Dee Dee's "You Sound Like You're Sick", "returns to the bassist's traditional institutionalised theme". Side A ends with "It's Not My Place (In the 9 to 5 World)", which was described by music critic David Fricke as "driven home" by drummer Marky's "feisty, Bo Diddley-style" drum beat, noting that it borrows the middle eight (of thirty-two-bar form) from the Who song "Whiskey Man".

"The KKK Took My Baby Away"
Despite the claims stating that "The KKK Took My Baby Away" was written by Joey about Johnny stealing his girlfriend, this theory was never proven and the true meaning remains unknown.

Side B of the album begins with "She's a Sensation", which was said by author Dave Thompson to have a 1960s melody which "melts through the hard rock". The next song, "7-11", deals with dating at a young age, where the couple goes on dates to places like convenience stores and record swaps. The lyrics follow a boy who meets a girl by a Space Invaders arcade machine, who eventually has to let her go after she dies in a car crash. True relates: "You can lose your heart within the singer's torched '7-11'. Joey details in time-honoured girl group fashion the beauty of young love that takes place among the most mundane, humdrum of surroundings." "You Didn't Mean Anything to Me", written by Dee Dee, reflects the desolation and vacillation that the bassist was feeling in his personal life, as well as within the band. This is evident through lines like "Every dinner was crummy/Even the ones for free." The pop-oriented song "Come On Now" was described by True as a "sparkling rush of blood to the head from the 'comic book boy'," with True adding that it was comparable to songs by The Dave Clark Five and 1910 Fruitgum Company. The eleventh track on the album, "This Business Is Killing Me", was written by Joey about how everyone expects him to please others but how he simply cannot please everyone all the time. Pleasant Dreams concludes with "Sitting in My Room", which David Fricke quoted in the conclusion of his review of the album, saying: "'It's us against them,' sneers Joey ... 'They just wanna worry ... /They just wanna be so lame/Maybe they should try and sniff some glue.' Or put Pleasant Dreams on the box and crank it up to ten."

== Reception ==
Professional ratings
Review scores
Source	Rating
AllMusic	3/5 stars
Robert Christgau	A−
Rolling Stone	4/5 stars
Spin Alternative Record Guide	3/10

Released on July 20, 1981, the album was not commercially successful, failing to spawn a single hit. Though Sire Records had merged with Warner Bros. Records, none of the singles from Pleasant Dreams were released in the US. Sire had insisted that the album be produced by a celebrity producer, hiring Graham Gouldman to the job expecting this to help expand the band's fan base. Joey relates: "The record company told us the album would bomb if we didn't use Graham Gouldman, so we worked with Graham--and the album bombed anyway." The album would only chart in the US and Sweden, peaking at 58 on the Billboard 200 and 35 on the Sverigetopplistan chart, with the singles released from the album failing to chart.

Pleasant Dreams received mixed reviews from critics, with many pointing out that the high quality sound production made the band stray from their roots even more so than the change in style. Stephen Thomas Erlewine, senior editor for AllMusic, noted that Gouldman steers the band's style away from "bubblegum, British invasion, and surf fetishes" and toward "acid rock and heavy metal". He went on to say that the sound quality was "too clean to qualify as punk" and that the music on the album had "lost sight of the infectious qualities that made their earlier records such fun". The Spin Alternative Record Guide panned the "halfhearted metal moves".

Music critic Robert Christgau said that the album "comes off corny" compared to the band's first four releases, which he described as "aural rush and conceptual punch". While he felt that the songs featured on the album were better than those on End of the Century, he claimed the album was "less focused" compared to Leave Home, but "fun anyway". David Fricke of Rolling Stone began his review by writing "Pity the poor Ramones", and went on to give it a mixed review of four out of five stars. He stated that the Ramones are a “comic relief", not shrinking away from real life. Fricke noted "studio sleight of hand: fortified vocal harmonies, an occasional dash of keyboards, a certain production gimmickry. But the ironically titled Pleasant Dreams is actually the Ramones‘ state-of-the-union message, an impassioned display of irrepressible optimism and high-amp defiance laced with bitterness over what they see as corporate sabotage of their rock & roll fantasies.“

The New York Times concluded that "the Ramones have made a record that sounds like a New York version of the Beach Boys... The tempos are considerably faster, but so is life in the big city." The Boston Globe praised Gouldman's "intelligent, balanced production, in contrast with Phil Spector's stultifying barrier of sound on the band's last album."

== Track listing ==
Track listing adapted from AllMusic.

All tracks are written by Joey Ramone, except where noted.

Side one
No.	Title	Writer(s)	Length
1.	"We Want the Airwaves"		3:22
2.	"All's Quiet on the Eastern Front"	Dee Dee Ramone	2:14
3.	"The KKK Took My Baby Away"		2:32
4.	"Don't Go"		2:48
5.	"You Sound Like You're Sick"	Dee Dee Ramone	2:42
6.	"It's Not My Place (In the 9 to 5 World)"		3:24

Side two
No.	Title	Writer(s)	Length
7.	"She's a Sensation"		3:29
8.	"7-11"		3:38
9.	"You Didn't Mean Anything to Me"	Dee Dee Ramone	3:00
10.	"Come On Now"	Dee Dee Ramone	2:33
11.	"This Business Is Killing Me"		2:41
12.	"Sitting in My Room"	Dee Dee Ramone	2:30
Total length:			34:53

2002 expanded edition CD (Warner Archives/Rhino) bonus tracks
No.	Title	Writer(s)	Length
13.	"Touring" (1981 version; album outtake)		2:49
14.	"I Can't Get You Out of My Mind" (album outtake)		3:24
15.	"Chop Suey" (alternate version; original version from the Get Crazy soundtrack)		3:32
16.	"Sleeping Troubles" (demo)	Ramones	2:07
17.	"Kicks to Try" (demo)	Ramones	2:09
18.	"I'm Not an Answer" (demo)	Ramones	2:55
19.	"Stares in This Town" (demo)	Ramones	2:26

Note

- Tracks 13–19 are previously unissued.

Pleasant Dreams (New York Mixes) - 2023

Side One
No.	Title	Writer(s)	Length
1.	"We Want the Airwaves"	Joey Ramone
2.	"All's Quiet on the Eastern Front"	Dee Dee Ramone
3.	"The KKK Took My Baby Away"	Joey Ramone
4.	"Don't Go"	Joey Ramone
5.	"You Sound Like You're Sick"	Dee Dee Ramone
6.	"It's Not My Place (In the 9 to 5 World)"	Joey Ramone
7.	"I Can't Get You Out of My Mind"	Joey Ramone

Side Two
No.	Title	Writer(s)	Length
8.	"She's a Sensation"	Joey Ramone
9.	"7-11"	Joey Ramone
10.	"You Didn't Mean Anything to Me"	Dee Dee Ramone
11.	"Sleeping Troubles"	Ramones
12.	"This Business is Killing Me"	Joey Ramone
13.	"Sitting In My Room"	Dee Dee Ramone
14.	"Touring"	Joey Ramone

== Recording information ==
- Tracks 1–14: basic tracks recorded at Mediasound, New York City, March–April 1981. Keyboards, percussion, backing vocals, and most of Joey Ramone's vocals were recorded at 10cc's Strawberry Studios in Stockport and Dorking, England, April 1981.
- Track 15: recording information unknown.
- Tracks 16–19: recorded at Daily Planet Studios, New York City, January–February 1981. Produced by Ed Stasium.

Four tracks from the Pleasant Dreams recording sessions have subsequently been re-recorded: "All's Quiet on the Eastern Front" on Dee Dee Ramone's 1994 solo album I Hate Freaks Like You; "Come On Now" on Dee Dee Ramone's 2000 solo album Greatest & Latest; "I Can't Get You Out of My Mind" (as "Can't Get You Outta My Mind") on the 1989 Ramones album Brain Drain; "Touring" on the 1992 Ramones album Mondo Bizarro.

== Personnel ==
Ramones

- Joey Ramone – lead & backing vocals
- Johnny Ramone – guitar, backing vocals
- Dee Dee Ramone – bass, backing & lead vocals (track 18)
- Marky Ramone – drums, backing vocals

Additional musicians

- Vic Emerson (Note: Erroneously credited as 'Dick Emerson' on the album sleeve.) – synthesizers
- Dave Hassell (Note: Last name misspelt as 'Hassel' on the album sleeve.) – percussion
- Graham Gouldman – rhythm guitar, backing vocals
- Russell Mael – backing vocals
- Ian Wilson – backing vocals
- Debbie Harry – backing vocals (track 15)
- Kate Pierson – backing vocals (track 15)
- Cindy Wilson – backing vocals (track 15)

Production

- Graham Gouldman – producer
- Lincoln Y. Clapp – engineer (Mediasound)
- Harvey Goldberg – engineer (Mediasound)
- Chris Nagle – engineer (Strawberry North)
- Keith Bessey – engineer, mixing (Strawberry South)
- Harry Spiridakis – assistant engineer (Mediasound)
- Andy Hoffman – assistant engineer (Mediasound)
- John Dixon – assistant engineer (Strawberry North)
- Mark Cockburn – assistant engineer (Strawberry North)
- Steve Cooksey – assistant engineer (Strawberry South)
- Melvyn Abrahams – mastering
- Michael Somoroff – photos
- M & Co. – design
- Guy Juke – uncredited cover art

== Charts ==
Chart (1981)	Peak position
Australian Albums (Kent Music Report)	87
Swedish Albums (Sverigetopplistan)	35
US Billboard 200	58

Chart (1987)	Peak position
Argentina (CAPIF)	7

Chart (2023)	Peak position
Hungarian Albums (MAHASZ)	19
Scottish Albums (Official Charts)	80

== Certifications ==
Certifications for Pleasant Dreams
Region	Certification	Certified units/sales
Argentina (CAPIF)	Gold	30,000^{^}
^{^} Shipments figures based on certification alone.
