= End of the Century: The Story of the Ramones =

- Promotional poster for the documentary
- Directed by: Jim Fields; Michael Gramaglia
- Produced by: Diana Holtzberg; Andrew Hurwitz; Jan Rofekamp; Jim Fields; Michael Gramaglia
- Starring: The Ramones; Rob Zombie
- Cinematography: David Bowles; Jim Fields; John Gramaglia; Michael Gramaglia; Peter Hawkins; George Seminara
- Edited by: Jim Fields; John Gramaglia
- Distributed by: Magnolia Pictures (United States)
- Release dates: January 19, 2003 (Slamdance Film Festival); August 20, 2004 (United States)
- Running time: 110 minutes
- Country: United States
- Language: English

End of the Century: The Story of the Ramones is a 2003 documentary film about highly influential New York punk rock band the Ramones. The film, produced and directed by Jim Fields and Michael Gramaglia, documents the band's history from their formation in the early 1970s and 22 subsequent years of touring, to their 1996 breakup and the deaths of two of the four original members. The title is taken from the Ramones' 1980 album, End of the Century. Johnny Ramone died shortly after its release.

== Overview ==
The film tells the story of the Ramones from their beginnings in Forest Hills, Queens and earliest performances at New York's CBGB's to their unexpected induction into the Rock and Roll Hall of Fame in 2002. It features comprehensive and candid interviews with members Dee Dee Ramone (who died in 2002), Johnny Ramone (who died in 2004) Joey Ramone (who died in 2001), Marky Ramone, C.J. Ramone, Tommy Ramone, Richie Ramone, and Elvis Ramone. Others close to the band are also interviewed, including Joey's mother and brother, contemporaries such as Debbie Harry and Joe Strummer, and childhood friends of the members. The filmmakers first attempted to make the film in 1994 to document the final year of the band on the road but ran into difficulties with the band's management. Fields and Gramaglia successfully restarted the production in 1998 after the band had officially retired.

A rough cut of End of the Century premiered at the Slamdance Film Festival in 2003, with its run-time subsequently shortened by nearly one hour. The final and completed version of the film didn't appear until February 2004 at the Berlin Film Festival and the film was released in the U.S. in August 2004.

== Reception ==
On review aggregator website Rotten Tomatoes, the film holds an approval rating of 95% based on 59 reviews, with an average rating of 7.7/10.

== Certifications ==
Certifications for End of the Century: The Story of the Ramones
Region	Certification	Certified units/sales
Argentina (CAPIF)	Platinum	8,000^{^}
Australia (ARIA)	Gold	7,500^{^}
United Kingdom (BPI)	Gold	25,000^{*}
^{*} Sales figures based on certification alone.^{^} Shipments figures based on certification alone.
