= R.A.M.O.N.E.S. =

1991 song by Motörhead

"Ramones"

Song by Motörhead

from the album 1916
- Released: 26 February 1991
- Recorded: Autumn 1990
- Genre: Punk rock
- Length: 1:25
- Label: WTG Records
- Songwriters: Phil Campbell; Würzel; Lemmy; Phil Taylor
- Producer: Pete Solley

"R.A.M.O.N.E.S."

Song by Motörhead

from the album Kiss of Death
- Released: 29 August 2006
- Recorded: 2006; Paramount Studios, Hollywood; NRG Studios, Hollywood; Maple Studios, Costa Mesa
- Length: 1:22
- Label: SPV
- Songwriters: Phil Campbell; Würzel; Lemmy; Phil Taylor
- Producer: Cameron Webb

"R.A.M.O.N.E.S." is a song first recorded by the British rock band Motörhead on their 1991 album 1916 as a tribute to their friends and contemporaries, the Ramones.

== History ==
The bands were long-standing admirers of each other's work. Critic Andy Boot, reviewing the album in Kerrang (27 February 1991) described the song as "the icing on a very fine, if somewhat heavy, cake." Joey Ramone said of the track: "It was the ultimate honor - like John Lennon writing a song for you". The track was first aired before Phil Taylor and Würzel left the band.

The Ramones also performed it on and off until their final show in August 1996, during which C.J. Ramone and Lemmy shared lead vocals. Two different studio versions were recorded. One appears as a bonus track on their album ¡Adios Amigos! with C.J. Ramone singing lead vocals and the other one on the Greatest Hits Live with Joey Ramone singing lead vocals.

The Huntingtons also covered this song on their File Under Ramones album. The Groovie Ghoulies cover the song on the Motorhead tribute album Built for Speed.

"R.A.M.O.N.E.S." was also covered by the Offspring on their performance at Rock in Rio 5 on 14 September 2013. At that show, Marky Ramone (who was the drummer of the Ramones from 1978 to 1983, and again from 1987 to their breakup in 1996) joined them onstage to perform cover versions of "R.A.M.O.N.E.S." and "California Sun".
