= End of the Century =

Studio album by the Ramones
- Released: February 4, 1980
- Recorded: May 1979
- Studios: Gold Star, Excalibur, Devonshire Sound, Salty Dog, Original Sound and Scream (Los Angeles)
- Genre: Punk rock
- Length: 34:14
- Label: Sire
- Producer: Phil Spector

Ramones chronology
| Road to Ruin (1978) | End of the Century (1980) | Pleasant Dreams (1981) |

Singles from End of the Century
- 1. "Rock 'n' Roll High School" Released: June 1, 1979; 2. "Baby, I Love You" Released: January 1980; 3. "Do You Remember Rock 'n' Roll Radio?" Released: May 16, 1980

End of the Century is the fifth studio album by the American punk rock band Ramones, released on February 4, 1980, through Sire Records. The album was the band's first to be produced by Phil Spector, though he had offered the band his assistance earlier in their career. With Spector fully producing the album, it was the first release that excluded original member Tommy Ramone, who had left the band in 1978 but had produced their previous album Road to Ruin. Spector used more advanced standards of engineering, such as high-quality overdubbing and echo chambers. These painstaking methods caused conflict between the band and Spector since the Ramones were accustomed to a quicker recording process. Spector emphasized the production value as well, working with a budget of around $200,000, far exceeding their earlier album sessions.

The songs on End of the Century were written primarily to expand the band's fan base, straying from the band's original punk genre and steering toward a more pop oriented sound. The lyrics on the album deal with various topics, ranging from drug addictions to the band's lifestyle while touring. The album also features a cover of the Ronettes' song "Baby, I Love You", as well as successors to the previous Ramones songs "Judy Is a Punk" and "Havana Affair".

It received generally positive reviews from critics, though many reviewers were less favorable than they had been to the band's previous releases, due to Spector's production quality and the band's desire for mainstream success starting to show in their music. Despite this, the album is the highest-charting Ramones album of all time, reaching number 44 on the US Billboard 200 chart, and number 14 on the UK Albums Chart. End of the Century spawned the singles "Baby, I Love You" and "Do You Remember Rock 'n' Roll Radio?", both of which charted in Europe.

== Recording and production ==
In February 1977 after attending a Ramones concert in Los Angeles, music producer Phil Spector offered to assist in making Rocket to Russia. The band declined his offer, feeling as though the album would not be the same without Tommy Ramone and Tony Bongiovi producing the album. While the band refused his initial offer, their management later asked Spector to help with the album because of their lack of popularity and sales. End of the Century would be the first album released without former drummer and producer Tommy.

Spector had become famous through his work with the Ronettes, the Righteous Brothers, Ike and Tina Turner, the Beatles and John Lennon, among others. With these releases, Spector defined what would become known as the "Wall of Sound", which is a dense, layered, and reverberant sound that came across well on AM radio and jukeboxes. These standards are created through instruments performing identical parts in unison, using high-quality overdubbing and echo chambers to aid in the production value. The producer was convinced that the Ramones had talent with lyrics and musical structure, so he intended to promote the band through more advanced methods of sound output.

Recording sessions for the album began on May 1, 1979 at Gold Star Studios in Hollywood, Los Angeles. Gold Star Studios had become famous through its history with artists like Eddie Cochran and the Beach Boys. The band stayed at the Tropicana Motel. The Ramones had stayed there during shooting of Rock 'n' Roll High School. In between filming, songs were written that would later appear on End of the Century.

At the Ramones' request, Ed Stasium joined the band in Los Angeles, serving as 'musical director', playing additional guitar parts and singing backing vocals, but not engineering. During the studio work, Spector's recording methods were different from those the Ramones were accustomed to from their four previous studio albums. The band recorded their earlier compositions in the shortest time possible for the lowest feasible budget, with a relatively low production value. With End of the Century, which took nearly six months to mix, the band experienced Spector's infamous perfectionism, and a budget of $200,000 ($869,000 in 2024) to fully record and produce the album. This is significant because the band's debut album cost $6,400 ($35,486 in 2024) total, and their second album cost $10,000 ($55,447 in 2024). End of the Century is the most expensive album in the Ramones' career.

=== Conflict ===
Spector's method of recording caused conflicts to arise. Bassist Dee Dee Ramone wrote of Spector's obsessive techniques: "Phil would sit in the control room and would listen through the headphones to Marky hit one note on the drum, hour after hour, after hour, after hour." During the recording of "Rock 'n' Roll High School", Johnny was forced by Spector to repeat his part hundreds of times for several hours. Sire Records owner Seymour Stein relates: "To Johnny, this must have been like the Chinese water torture." "I understood [Spector's] attitude," said Marky. "He was from The Bronx, I was from Brooklyn. We got along very well and had a nice rapport... But he had his way of working that was very slow, and the Ramones had their way of working which was very fast. So that would sometimes irk everybody, and led to animosity with Johnny and Dee Dee."

Early in the sessions, Spector reportedly held the Ramones hostage at gunpoint. According to Dee Dee, when Spector took Joey away for a three-hour private meeting in his mansion where the album was to be recorded, Dee Dee went looking for them. "The next thing I knew Phil appeared at the top of the staircase, shouting and waving a pistol."

He leveled his gun at my heart and then motioned for me and the rest of the band to get back in the piano room ... He only holstered his pistol when he felt secure that his bodyguards could take over. Then he sat down at his black concert piano and made us listen to him play and sing "Baby, I Love You" until well after 4:30 in the morning.

— Dee Dee Ramone

Johnny gave a similar account in a 1986 interview:

He always carried three guns around with him...We were prisoners in his house for about six hours, and we thought we were gonna get shot. I said, ‘Let’s go,’ and he pulled out a gun and said, ‘Do you wanna leave?’ I said, ‘No, that’s OK, we’ll stay for a while.’

— Johnny Ramone

However, in 2008, Marky Ramone gave a different account of the story:

There were no guns pointed at anybody. They [guns] were there but he had a license to carry. He never held us hostage. We could have left at any time.

— Marky Ramone

Dee Dee claimed to have left the sessions without recording anything. "We had been working for at least fourteen or fifteen hours a day for thirteen days straight and we still hadn't recorded one note of music," he wrote in his autobiography. After supposedly hearing that Johnny had returned to New York, Dee Dee wrote that he and Marky Ramone booked a flight and returned home as well. "To this day, I still have no idea how they made the album End of the Century, or who actually played bass on it." Dee Dee's account contradicts much of the band's collective account from the 1982 Trouser Press interview, where the band stated that the only track that Johnny, Dee Dee and Marky did not play on was the cover of "Baby, I Love You"; as the band, save for Joey, had gone home after cutting basic tracks for the rest of the album. Ed Stasium, who was present the entire time except for the mixing, confirmed this in 2014, saying, "it's untrue that Dee Dee didn't play on the album. There's one song that the Ramones did not appear on ... It's no secret—Dee Dee had substance abuse problems. He may have forgotten, but Dee Dee played bass on the record."

== Compositions ==
End of the Century was described by the band as an album written solely to gain popularity, resulting in more of a punk rock with pop sensibilities. Joey failed to contribute to the best of his abilities on the album and recalled: "I think that some of the worst crap I ever wrote went on the album. That was me at my worst." Johnny also felt that the album was far from the band's prime:

End of the Century was just watered-down Ramones. It's not real Ramones. 'Baby, I Love You'—I didn't play on that at all. What am I gonna do—play along with an orchestra? There's no point. End of the Century was trying to get a hit on each song, instead of trying to get a hit on one or two of the songs on the album and trying to make the rest as raunchy as you can. They ain't gonna play the other ten songs, anyway.

The album opens with "Do You Remember Rock 'n' Roll Radio?", a throwback to the rock music of the 1950s and 1960s. The lyrics name several famous musicians of this era, including Jerry Lee Lewis, John Lennon, and T. Rex, and also cite The Ed Sullivan Show. Many instruments that were previously rarely—if ever—used in punk rock were featured in the song's score, including the saxophone and electronic organ. The lyrics, written by Joey, applied to all the band, Dee Dee explained. They depict his childhood in Germany where he would secretly listen to rock radio stations at night.

Johnny's part is not heard on the next track, "I'm Affected", as reported by Johnny himself. Joey admitted that he did not favor the song, recalling: "I couldn't believe how awful it sounded. It was horrible."

"Danny Says", the third track, was a lyrical depiction of what the band constantly went through while touring—soundchecks, autograph sessions, interviews, etc. The title "Danny Says" refers to the band's tour manager Danny Fields giving the members instructions, schedules, and demands. According to Joey, the ballad was inspired by Lou Reed, who had released the songs "Candy Says" and "Caroline Says". Joey's brother Mickey Leigh called the song a "masterpiece" and said it "remains one of the most captivatingly beautiful songs I've ever heard".

Dee Dee wrote the next song, "Chinese Rocks", in 1975 (with lyrical help from Richard Hell), and Johnny Thunders later revised it. Dee Dee wrote the piece in response to Lou Reed's "Heroin", and attempted to concoct better lyrics on the same subject of drug use and heroin addiction. After Johnny vetoed the song, it was recorded by Thunders's band the Heartbreakers before the Ramones, though the bands use slightly different words. The lyrics deal with the daily life of a heroin addict, and the term "Chinese rock" is a euphemism for the drug.

"The Return of Jackie and Judy" is a continuation to one of the band's earlier songs, "Judy is a Punk", which was released on their debut album Ramones. There were numerous studio guests involved in the album's recording, including producer/musicians, Dan Kessel and David Kessel, and California disc jockey Rodney Bingenheimer.

Side B begins with "Baby, I Love You". Johnny constantly claims in his book Commando that he hated the song and the band didn't even play on it, only Joey and some studio musicians. Joey exclaimed that he "hated" the song, despite it obtaining a level of popularity in Europe. The song is a cover version of the original by the Ronettes, and contained a string section arrangement that Leigh deemed "gooey" and that it "sounded right out of Redbone's 'Come and Get Your Love.'" He also confessed that the song "almost made [him] embarrassed".

"Rock 'n' Roll High School" originally appeared on the soundtrack to Rock 'n' Roll High School, a film directed by Allan Arkush. The movie depicts a storyline in which the Ramones are obsessed over by female high school student Riff Randell along with other pupils attending the school.

The album concludes with "High Risk Insurance", which is a reaction to politics of that era.

End of the Century marks the final Ramones album to feature songs officially credited to Joey, Johnny and Dee Dee together.

== Critical reception ==
Professional ratings
Review scores
| Source | Rating |
|---|---|
| AllMusic | 4/5 stars |
| Pitchfork | 6.4/10 |
| Q | 4/5 stars |
| Record Mirror | 3/5 stars |
| The Rolling Stone Album Guide | 3/5 stars |
| Smash Hits | 7/10 |
| Spin Alternative Record Guide | 3/10 |
| Uncut | 3.5/5 stars |
| The Village Voice | B+ |

The album received generally positive reviews from critics, but not as favorable for many of the band's previous records. Stephen Thomas Erlewine, senior editor for AllMusic, noted that the Ramones desired mainstream success much more and were recording music in such a fashion as to expand their fan base. Another AllMusic editor, T. Donald Guarisco, noted that the "entire album is pretty controversial in the world of Ramones fandom". Although he gave the album a "B+" rating, music critic Robert Christgau nevertheless called the album "[s]ad", and described the band as "tired". He also felt that Spector's production failed to make much of a difference in the band's overall sound, saying "his guitar overdubs are worse than his orchestrations, and they're not uncute."

Kurt Loder, reviewing the album for Rolling Stone, called it "Phil Spector's finest and most mature effort in years", and said that his production created a setting "rich and vibrant and surging with power". He noted that the Ramones are still "spotlighted", rather than their producer. Author Richard Williams exclaimed that to "old fans the Ramones' version of 'Baby, I Love You' went too far, desecrating the memory of the original despite Joey's evident devotion to the task of emulating Ronnie's lead vocal." Williams also said that "Do You Remember Rock 'n' Roll Radio" and "Chinese Rocks" maintained the principles of the Ramones in their earlier days.

== Commercial performance ==
End of the Century is the Ramones' highest-peaking album on the US Billboard 200 (having reached No. 44 during a fourteen-week chart stay), as well as their most successful on the UK Albums Chart and the Swedish chart Sverigetopplistan. The album became the first—and only—Ramones' album to chart on Norway's VG-lista chart and New Zealand's Recorded Music NZ. It was also the band's first album to chart on the Netherlands' MegaCharts, with their 1987 album Halfway to Sanity being their only other release to chart there as well.

Two singles were spawned from End of the Century: "Baby, I Love You" and "Do You Remember Rock 'n' Roll Radio?", released respectively. The first single charted on Belgium's Ultratop chart as well as reaching number 8 in the UK. "Do You Remember Rock 'n' Roll Radio?" also charted in Europe, peaking and debuting at 54 on the UK Singles Chart.

== Track listing ==
All tracks originally credited to the Ramones (except "Baby, I Love You"). Actual writers are listed alongside the tracks where applicable.

Side one
| No. | Title | Writer(s) | Length |
|---|---|---|---|
| 1. | "Do You Remember Rock 'n' Roll Radio?" | Joey Ramone | 3:50 |
| 2. | "I'm Affected" | Joey Ramone | 2:51 |
| 3. | "Danny Says" | Joey Ramone | 3:06 |
| 4. | "Chinese Rock" | Dee Dee Ramone, Richard Hell | 2:28 |
| 5. | "The Return of Jackie and Judy" | | 3:12 |
| 6. | "Let's Go" | Dee Dee Ramone, Johnny Ramone | 2:31 |

Side two
| No. | Title | Writer(s) | Length |
|---|---|---|---|
| 7. | "Baby, I Love You" (The Ronettes cover) | Phil Spector, Jeff Barry, Ellie Greenwich | 3:47 |
| 8. | "I Can't Make It on Time" | Joey Ramone | 2:32 |
| 9. | "This Ain't Havana" | Dee Dee Ramone, Johnny Ramone | 2:18 |
| 10. | "Rock 'n' Roll High School" | Joey Ramone | 2:38 |
| 11. | "All the Way" | | 2:29 |
| 12. | "High Risk Insurance" | Dee Dee Ramone | 2:08 |
| Total length: | | | 34:14 |

2002 Deluxe Edition
| No. | Title | Writer(s) | Length |
|---|---|---|---|
| 13. | "I Want You Around" (soundtrack version) | | 3:05 |
| 14. | "Danny Says" (demo) | Joey Ramone | 2:19 |
| 15. | "I'm Affected" (demo) | Joey Ramone | 2:47 |
| 16. | "Please Don't Leave" (demo) | | 2:22 |
| 17. | "All the Way" (demo) | | 2:31 |
| 18. | "Do You Remember Rock 'n' Roll Radio?" (demo) | Joey Ramone | 3:43 |
| 19. | "End of the Century Radio Promo" | | 0:59 |
| Total length: | | | 52:12 |

Notes

- Track 13: first issued on the Rock 'n' Roll High School soundtrack, May 1979. Recorded at Cherokee Studios, Los Angeles.
- Tracks 14–18: previously unissued. Recorded at Sire Studio, New York City, April 19, 1979.

== Personnel ==
Credits adapted from the album's liner notes, except where noted.

Ramones

- Joey Ramone – lead vocals
- Johnny Ramone – guitar
- Dee Dee Ramone – bass, backing vocals
- Marky Ramone – drums

Additional musicians

- Ed Stasium – guitar, backing vocals
- Dan Kessel – guitar
- David Kessel – guitar
- Barry Goldberg – piano, organ
- Steve Douglas – saxophone
- Harvey Kubernik – percussion
- Jim Keltner – drums (7)
- Rodney Bingenheimer, Maria Montoya, Harvey Kubernik, Jeff Morrison, Phast Phreddie – handclaps (1, 5)
- Sean Donahue – disc jockey (1)

Technical

- Phil Spector – producer, remix (13)
- Ed Stasium – musical director, producer (13–18), engineer (13)
- Larry Levine – engineer
- Boris Menart – engineer
- Bruce Gold – assistant engineer
- Joel Soifer – remix engineer (13)
- Phil Brown – mastering
- Mick Rock – photography
- John Gillespie – art direction
- Spencer Drate – album design

== Charts ==
| Chart (1980) | Peak position |
|---|---|
| Australian Albums (Kent Music Report) | 53 |
| Canada Top Albums/CDs (RPM) | 41 |
| Dutch Albums (Album Top 100) | 27 |
| Finnish Albums (The Official Finnish Charts) | 14 |
| Italian Albums (Musica e Dischi) | 21 |
| New Zealand Albums (RMNZ) | 48 |
| Norwegian Albums (VG-lista) | 36 |
| Swedish Albums (Sverigetopplistan) | 10 |
| UK Albums (Official Charts) | 14 |
| US Billboard 200 | 44 |

== Certifications ==
Sales certifications for End of the Century
| Region | Certification | Certified units/sales |
|---|---|---|
| Argentina (CAPIF) | Gold | 30,000^{^} |
^{^} Shipments figures based on certification alone.

== Notes ==
- Kubernik, Harvey (2002). End of the Century (Expanded Edition) (booklet). Ramones.
- McNeil, Legs; McCain, Gillian (2006). Please Kill Me: The Uncensored Oral History of Punk. Grove Press. ISBN 978-0-8021-4264-1.
- Leigh, Mickey (2009). I Slept with Joey Ramone: A Family Memoir. Touchstone Books. ISBN 978-0-7432-5216-4.
- Porter, Dick (2004). Ramones: The Complete Twisted History. Plexus Publishing. ISBN 978-0-85965-326-8.
- Ramone, Dee Dee; Kofman, Veronica (2000). Lobotomy: Surviving the Ramones (2nd ed.). New York City: Thunder's Mouth Press. ISBN 978-1-56025-252-8.
- Ramone, Johnny (2012). Commando: The Autobiography of Johnny Ramone. Abrams Books. ISBN 978-1-61312-181-8.
- Schinder, Scott; Schwartz, Andy (2007). Icons of Rock: An Encyclopedia of the Legends Who Changed Music Forever. Vol. 2. Greenwood Publishing Group. ISBN 978-0-313-33847-2.
- True, Everett (2005). Hey Ho Let's Go: The Story of the Ramones. Omnibus Press. ISBN 978-1-84449-413-2.
- Unterberger, Richie (2009). White Light/White Heat: The Velvet Underground Day by Day. Jawbone Press. ISBN 978-1-906002-22-0.
- Williams, Richard (2003). Phil Spector: Out Of His Head. Omnibus Press. ISBN 978-0-7119-9864-3.
- Bessman, Jim (1993). The Ramones: An American Band. St. Martin's Press. ISBN 0-312-09369-1.
- Ramone, Marky; Herschlag, Richard (2015). Punk Rock Blitzkrieg: My Life As a Ramone. Atria Publishing Group. ISBN 978-1451687781.
