= Pet Sematary (song) =

Single by Ramones

from the album Brain Drain
- Released: June 1989
- Genre: Punk rock; horror punk
- Length: 3:30
- Label: Sire (US); Chrysalis (UK)
- Songwriters: Dee Dee Ramone, Daniel Rey
- Producers: Jean Beauvoir, Daniel Rey

Ramones singles chronology
"Somebody Put Something in My Drink" (1987)	"Pet Sematary" (1989)	"Poison Heart" (1992)

"Pet Sematary" is a single by American punk rock band Ramones, from their 1989 album Brain Drain. The song, originally written for the Stephen King 1989 film adaptation of the same name, became one of the Ramones' biggest radio hits and was a staple of their concerts during the 1990s. The song plays over the film’s credits.

== Background ==
King, a huge Ramones fan, invited the Ramones to his Bangor, Maine home as they played in New England. During the visit, he handed Dee Dee Ramone a copy of his Pet Sematary novel, and the bassist retreated to the basement. One hour later, Dee Dee returned with the lyrics to "Pet Sematary". Shortly afterwards, drummer Marky Ramone said that Dee Dee's attitude that day showed that he could achieve his plans to leave the band and attempt a career at hip hop music. He likened Dee Dee to King, saying that both wrote things people could relate to because they "penetrated to the curiosity, fears, and insecurities carried around with them and couldn't put into words."

== Composition ==
Producer Daniel Rey became a co-writer by assisting with the structure of the song, while producer Jean Beauvoir of the Plasmatics helped give the song a more commercial style fit for radio play and film inclusion. As "Pet Sematary" sounded closer to the rock ballads of the period, it was a struggle for Johnny Ramone to play the arpeggios and chords, despite Dee Dee's guidance.

== Personnel ==
Credits from Richard Buskin and engineer Fernando Kral, except where noted.

Ramones

- Joey Ramone – lead vocals
- Johnny Ramone – guitar
- Marky Ramone – drums

Additional musicians

- Daniel Rey – guitar, backing vocals
- Jean Beauvoir – bass, synthesizer, backing vocals

== Promotion ==
The music video for "Pet Sematary" was filmed at the Sleepy Hollow Cemetery in the eponymous New York village. Shot on a cold night in January 1989, the video features black and white shots of the Ramones walking through the graveyard, as well as color footage of the band and various others miming to the song alongside an open grave. The video ends with the band playing on a hydraulic platform placed inside the open grave, which is gradually lowered until a group of undertakers covers the grave with a headstone that reads "The Ramones". It was the last video featuring Dee Dee Ramone, who would depart the band and be replaced with C. J. Ramone. The video features cameos by Debbie Harry and Chris Stein of Blondie, as well as members of the Dead Boys.

An alternate edit of the video features the aforementioned scenes interspersed with scenes from the film, with the opening footage of the band walking through the graveyard now appearing in color. This version was briefly shown during an episode of Beavis and Butt-head, named "Good Credit".

== Reception ==
"Pet Sematary" became the band's highest-charting hit in the US, peaking at number 4 on the Billboard Modern Rock Tracks chart and number 6 on the Radio & Records New Rock chart. However, reception for the song was not entirely positive, as it was also nominated for the now-defunct Razzie Award for Worst Original Song in 1989.

== Cover versions ==
- Lemmikkihautuumaa is a Finnish cover version recorded by Pojat in 1994.
- Hard rock band Lizzy Borden released a cover on their 1994 compilation album Best of Lizzy Borden, Vol. 2.
- Groovie Ghoulies released a cover version on their 2003 album Monster Club.
- Hawthorne Heights recorded a cover, appearing on Ohio is for Covers (2015).
- Energy released a music video for their cover version in October 2015.
- Starcrawler contributed a cover for the 2019 soundtrack of the film Pet Sematary.

== Chart performance ==
Chart (1989)	Peak position
US Alternative Songs (Billboard)	4
US New Rock (Radio & Records)	6
US Post Modern (Hits)	9
