= Do You Remember Rock 'n' Roll Radio? =

1980 single by Ramones

- UK picture sleeve

Single by Ramones

from the album End of the Century
- Released: May 16, 1980
- Recorded: 1979
- Genre: Ska-punk * rock n' roll * power pop
- Length: 3:50
- Label: Sire Records
- Songwriters: Dee Dee Ramone; Johnny Ramone; Joey Ramone
- Producer: Phil Spector

Ramones singles chronology
"Danny Says" (1980)	"'Do You Remember Rock 'n' Roll Radio?'" (1980)	"I Wanna Be Sedated" (1980)

Music video
- "Do You Remember Rock 'n' Roll Radio?" on YouTube

"Do You Remember Rock 'n' Roll Radio?" is a song by American punk rock band Ramones, released by Sire Records as the second single and opening track from the band's fifth studio album End of the Century (1980). It was released on May 16, 1980. Produced by Phil Spector, the song and album marked a change in the Ramones' sound, in an attempt to achieve commercial success.

Based on many rock and pop songs the band grew up listening to, the song featured more complex instrumentation and production than past songs by the band, employing the use of saxophone and organ, along with the standard guitar, drums and bass. The song criticized the state of mainstream rock music at that time and took a roots rock approach.

The album's title End of the Century came from a couplet in the song's lyrics: "It's the end, the end of the seventies/It's the end, the end of the century." This verse also provided the title of the 2003 documentary about the group, End of the Century: The Story of the Ramones.

The opening riff of the song appears in the trailers of DreamWorks Animation's Shrek the Third, which was released in 2007. The song also appears in the film's soundtrack.

== Lyrical content ==
The Ramones sought to return rock music to its most basic roots, abandoning movements such as late 1960s psychedelic rock and early 1970s prog rock music. The song states the Ramones' philosophy in lines such as "We need change, we need it fast/Before rock's just part of the past/'Cause lately it all sounds the same to me".

The song opens with a simulation of a radio dial being tuned across stations before a disc jockey introduces the song. The voice is that of Sean Donahue, who was a DJ at San Francisco's KSAN and San Jose's KOME at the time.

Many of the band's influences are mentioned in the song, including Murray the K, John Lennon, Jerry Lee Lewis, T. Rex, the Barbarians (whose drummer, Victor "Moulty" Moulton, is mentioned by his nickname) and Alan Freed, as well as musical variety TV and radio shows such as Hullabaloo, Shindig!, Upbeat and The Ed Sullivan Show. Furthermore, a clip of Buddy Holly and the Crickets performing on The Ed Sullivan Show appears in the music video.

While the song celebrates the Ramones' teenage rock and roll memories, it also reflects and criticizes the trend of playing nostalgic songs on radio, rather than focusing on new music.

== Reception ==
Record World called it a "thunderous paean to radio as it should be".

== Track listing ==
U.S. 7" Single

1. "Do You Remember Rock 'n' Roll Radio?" (Ramones) - 3:50
2. "Let's Go" (Ramones) - 3:02

== Charts ==
Weekly chart performance for "Do You Remember Rock 'n' Roll Radio"
Chart (1980)	Peak
Spain (AFE)	27
