= J. Robert Harris =

American composer

J. Robert Harris (September 27, 1925 – February 13, 2000) was an American composer, notably of the 1967 Spider-Man television series theme song "Spider-Man". He also composed the theme for the 1962 Stanley Kubrick film Lolita.

His brother is the director, producer and screenwriter James B. Harris.
