= C. J. Ramone =

American musician (born 1965)

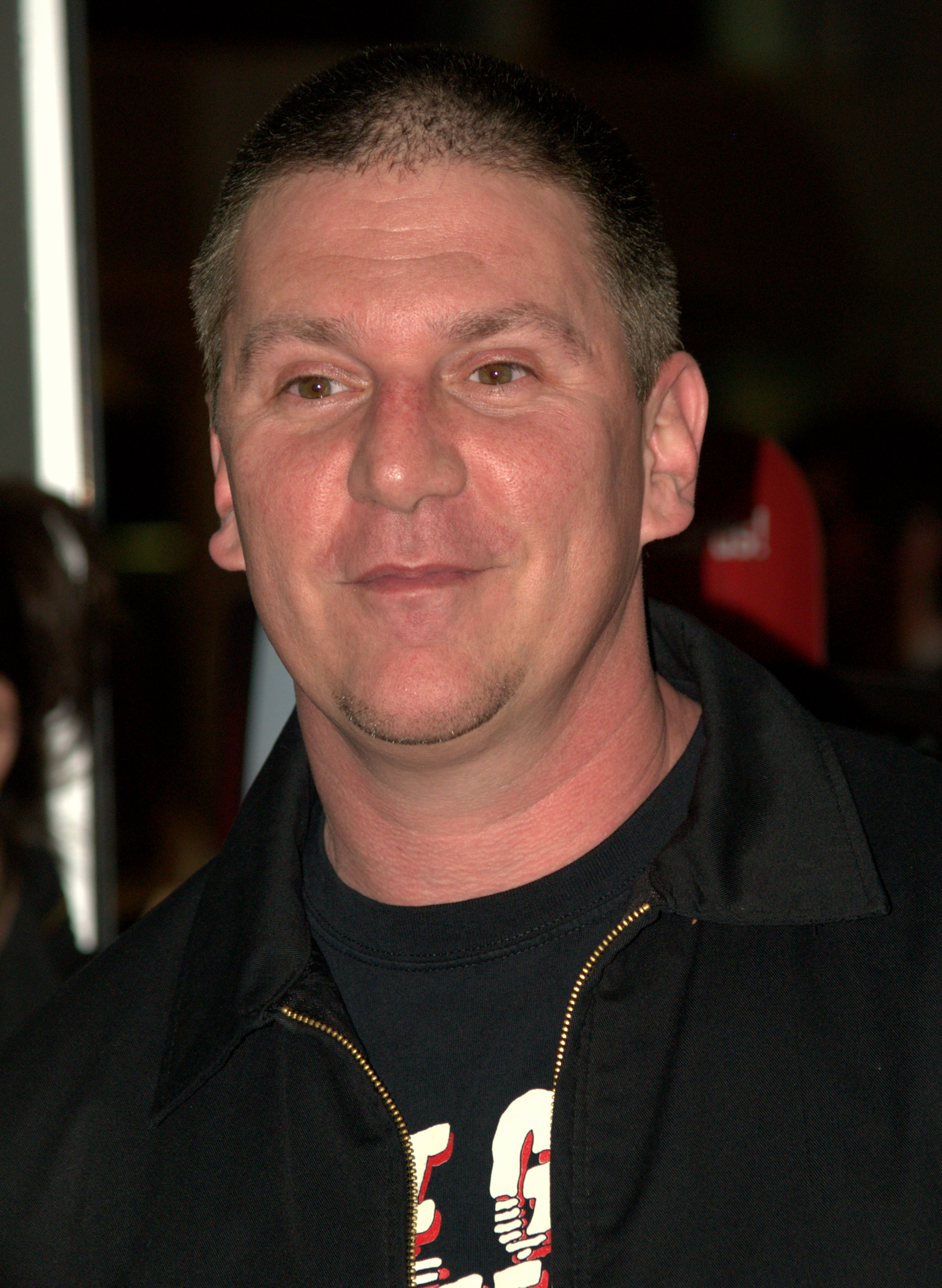
- Ramone at the 2009 Tribeca Film Festival

Background information
- Also known as: C. Jay
- Born: Christopher Joseph Ward; October 8, 1965 (age 61); Queens, New York City, U.S.
- Genres: Punk rock, heavy metal
- Occupation: Musician
- Instruments: Bass, vocals
- Years active: 1989–present
- Labels: Sire, Radioactive, Chrysalis, Mayhem, ACME, The Raven and the Crow, Fat Wreck Chords
- Website: cjramone.com

Signature
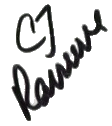

Christopher Joseph Ward (born October 8, 1965), known professionally as C. J. Ramone, is an American musician. He is best known for performing from 1989 to 1996 as the bassist, backing vocalist and occasional lead vocalist of the punk rock group the Ramones after replacing original bassist Dee Dee Ramone — a role that lasted until the band's retirement. He is one of three Ramones former members (and the only bassist) still living and active in music, the others being Marky Ramone and Richie Ramone.

== Background ==
Christopher Joseph Ward was born in Queens, New York City, but lived in Deer Park, New York for most of his early life. He attended Ss. Cyril and Methodius School and graduated from Deer Park High School in 1983.

Prior to joining the Ramones, Ward served in the United States Marine Corps but lost the title of Marine due to going absent without leave and was discharged. He was a fan of the Ramones, particularly of Dee Dee Ramone, before joining the band, and later played with him in a band called the Ramainz, which was formed by Dee Dee Ramone, Marky Ramone and Dee Dee's wife, Barbara Zampini.

He also played in Guitar Pete's Axe Attack, Los Gusanos, Bad Chopper. Ward released the album Reconquista on June 29, 2012, and his album Last Chance to Dance was released in November (United States) and December (Europe) 2014. American Beauty was released on March 17, 2017, in the United States. The Holy Spell was released in 2019.

== Ramones ==
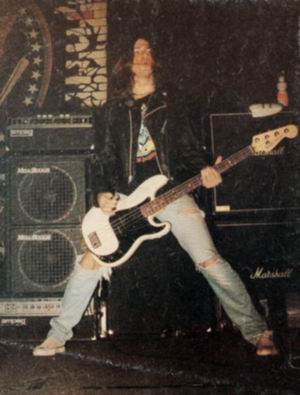
Ramone performing in 1991

Ward replaced original band member Dee Dee Ramone, though Dee Dee continued to write songs for the band. Ward went to the audition with the sole purpose of jamming with the Ramones; he was not "nervous or intimidated" as he did not expect to get the job but much to his surprise, he did. After being discharged from the Marines and learning forty Ramones songs in five weeks, Ward played his first live show with the band on September 30, 1989. Adjusting to the Ramones' play style was one of the biggest challenges he had, as Ward was originally a fingerstyle bassist as opposed to Dee Dee's signature downpicking technique. He eventually learned to adapt by lowering his bass down to his kneecap and wearing sweatbands to protect his wrists.

Ward sang many well-known Ramones songs (including those previously sung by Dee Dee) and gave the band a younger image. In the documentary End of the Century: The Story of the Ramones it is stated that when Ward joined the Ramones he was seen as a breath of fresh air for the band. Johnny Ramone says he knew immediately when Ward auditioned to replace Dee Dee that he was right, commenting that he "had the right look". When the Ramones were inducted into the Rock and Roll Hall of Fame original Ramones drummer, Tommy Ramone, credited Ward with "keeping the band young".

Ward was the youngest member of the Ramones when he joined, by nine years. He also shared a birthday, October 8, with bandmate Johnny Ramone. While Ward's first live show with the Ramones was on September 30, 1989, in Leicester, England, his official debut with the band was three weeks earlier on September 4 during the Jerry Lewis MDA Telethon that aired on WWOR-TV in New York. Ward played with the band for the remainder of their run prior to their dissolution on August 6, 1996.

== Equipment ==
Ward used Ampeg SVT amplifiers for most of his career, having inherited several amps from Dee Dee Ramone. However, he has since switched to Fender Bassman amps, stating that the Ampeg amps had "substantial historical value" and he wished to preserve them.

Prior to joining the Ramones, Ward played an early '70s Fender Jazz Bass and always played fingerstyle, explaining in a 2015 interview with Fender that he stopped at a music store to buy picks on his way to first meet the band. When he joined the Ramones, they gave him a black Mexican Fender Precision Bass, with a white pickguard and a maple neck and that was his main bass for the first gigs with the Ramones. He also had two cream Fender Precision basses, one with a white pickguard and another with a black. (These basses can be seen in various backstage photos.) He then bought a white American Fender Precision with a white pickguard (later switched to a black to make it look more like Dee Dee's bass guitars). Then he finally got a vintage 1979 Fender Precision, like the basses that Dee Dee used to play. He would mainly use that bass for the rest of his time in the Ramones.

While with the Ramones, Ward also had a custom-made white Mosrite Bass with a tortoiseshell pickguard made for him by Semie Moseley; this bass made a notable appearance in the Ramones' I Don't Want To Grow Up video. He used it while with Bad Chopper and has since sold this bass. He then used another white Mosrite bass with a black pickguard that he designed with Mr. Yuasa of the Filmore Company, the Mosrite copyright owner in Japan; this bass was stolen during Ward's tour of Japan in February 2010.

Currently, Ward plays Fender Dee Dee Ramone Precision Basses with Leo Quan BadAss II bridges added.

== Other bands ==
Before the Ramones, Ward played in a heavy metal band called Guitar Pete's Axe Attack, where he appeared on two albums. In 1992, while still with the Ramones, he started a hard rock band named Los Gusanos. They released a few singles before releasing their only album in 1997, which was worked on by Ramones producer Daniel Rey. After the Ramones' retirement Ward played a few shows with the Ramainz, a Ramones tribute band formed by Dee Dee Ramone, Marky Ramone and Dee Dee's wife Barbara Zampini. In 1998, Los Gusanos broke up, leading to Ward's next band the Warm Jets, which released one single before changing their name due to another band with the same name. As Bad Chopper, they released a single and in 2007, a self-titled album. The band broke up in summer 2009. From 2009 to 2019, he toured just as CJ Ramone with rotating members on guitar and drums. He released four albums and a single as CJ Ramone. In 2001, after the departure of bassist Jason Newstead, Metallica invited Ward to join the band on bass, but he turned down the offer, as his son had recently been diagnosed with autism. Since 2018, he has filled in on bass at live shows for Me First and the Gimme Gimmes. He also sometimes plays with the Aquabats live shows.

== Personal life ==
Ward was married to Marky Ramone's niece, Chessa Au, with whom he has two children. He is now married to lawyer Denise Barton, with whom he has one daughter.

== Band members ==
Current members

- CJ Ramone – bass, lead vocals (July 2009 – present)
- Dan Root – guitar, backing vocals (September 2012 – present)
- Pete Sosa – drums (December 2014 – present)
- Josh Blackway – guitar, backing vocals (October 2015 – present)
- Nate Sander – guitar, backing vocals (November 2015 – present)
- Chris Eller – drums (October 2015 – present)

Past members

- Steve Soto – guitar, backing vocals (July 2012 – 2018; died 2018)
- Daniel Rey – guitar, vocals (July 2009 – September 2011)
- Steve Dawson – guitar, backing vocals (October 2011 – February 2012)
- Jonny Wickersham – guitar, backing vocals (July 2013 – October 2013)
- Ian Fowles - guitar, backing vocals (June 2015, July 2016)
- Brant Bjork – drums (July 2009 – February 2010)
- Michael Stamberg – drums (March 2010 – July 2013)
- David Hidalgo Jr. – drums, backing vocals (February 2013 – October 2013)
- Michael Wildwood – drums, backing vocals (November 2013 – September 2014)
- Joe Rizzo – drums (January 2013, November 2014 – May 2015)
- Richard Falomir - drums, backing vocals (June 2015)

Guest appearances

- Brian Costanza – guitar (July 2009)
- Marty Friedman – guitar (February 2010)
- Dez Cadena – guitar, vocals (July 2012)
- Jiro Okabe – guitar (November 2012)
- Ben Wah – guitar (November 2012)
- Chorin – drums (November 2012)
- Bruce Edwards – guitar (January 2013)
- Todd Youth – guitar (November 2013)
- Walt Stack – guitar, backing vocals (January 2014, July 2014, March 2015, May 2015)
- John Frochaux – drums (September 2015)
- Michale Graves - vocals (October 8, 2017)

== Discography ==
=== With Guitar Pete's Axe Attack ===
- Dead Soldier's Revenge (1985)
- Nightmare (1986)

=== With the Ramones ===
Studio Albums

- Mondo Bizarro (1992)
- Acid Eaters (1993)
- ¡Adios Amigos! (1995)

Live Albums

- Loco Live (1991)
- Greatest Hits Live (1996)
- We're Outta Here! (1997)

=== With Los Gusanos ===
- "Quick to Cut" 7-inch (1993)
- Youth Gone Mad split 7-inch (1994)
- I'd Love to Save the World EP (1994)
- Los Gusanos (1998)

=== With Bad Chopper ===
- The Warm Jets 7-inch (as The Warm Jets) (2000)
- "Real Bad Time" 7-inch (2003)
- Bad Chopper (2007)

=== Solo ===
- Reconquista (2012)
- "Understand Me?" 7-inch (2014)
- Last Chance to Dance (2013-2014)
- American Beauty (2017)
- The Holy Spell (2019)

=== Other appearances ===
- Guest vocals on "Love Sucks" on The Independents' album In for the Kill (1995)
- Bass on "The Bowery Electric" on the Bowery Electric Crews single (2002)
- Guest vocals on "Punishment Fits the Crime" with Bien Desocupados on Todos somos Ramones (2005)
- "I Wanna Be Sedated" and "Blitzkrieg Bop" on collection album "Mosrite Rebirth" (2012)
- Guest vocals on "The Way I Let You Down" and "Won't Let Go" on Mondo Generator album Hell Comes to Your Heart (2012)
