= Rockaway Beach (song) =

Single by Ramones

from the album Rocket to Russia
- B-side: "Locket Love"
- Released: November 1977
- Genre: Punk rock; surf punk; bubblegum
- Length: 2:06
- Label: Sire
- Songwriter: Dee Dee Ramone
- Producers: Tony Bongiovi, Tommy Ramone

Ramones singles chronology
| "Sheena Is a Punk Rocker" (1977) | "Rockaway Beach" (1977) | "Do You Wanna Dance?" (1978) |

Audio
- "Rockaway Beach" on YouTube

"Rockaway Beach" is a song by the American punk rock band Ramones, released in 1977 from the band's third studio album Rocket to Russia. The song was written by bassist Dee Dee Ramone in the style of the Beach Boys and early surf rock bands. The song is about Rockaway Beach in Queens, where Dee Dee liked to spend time. Guitarist Johnny Ramone claimed that Dee Dee was "the only real beachgoer" in the group. Released in 1977, it was the Ramones' highest-charting single in their career, peaking at number 66 on the Billboard Hot 100.

== Background ==
"Rockaway Beach" was inspired by the actual Rockaway Beach located in New York, where lead singer Joey Ramone was raised. The song was written by bassist Dee Dee Ramone who frequently visited the beach.

== Composition ==
"Rockaway Beach" is a punk rock song that runs for a duration of two minutes and six seconds. According to the sheet music published at Musicnotes.com by Alfred Music, it is written in the time signature of common time with the exception of the interlude, which is in 5/4, with a driving punk rock tempo of 185 beats per minute. "Rockaway Beach" is composed in the key of A major, while Joey Ramone's vocal range spans from the low-note of E_{4} to the high-note of A_{5}. The song has a basic sequence of C♯–D–C♯–D during the introduction, follows A–D–E in the verses and chorus, and changes to F#m-A-F#m-D-E at the bridge as its chord progression.

The musical arrangement opens with an instrumental introduction, where a rhythm guitar part is played at high-speed using downstrokes with grinding distortion. "Rockaway Beach" is a breezy number laden with catchy hooks. It express carefree lyrics that hearken back to simpler, brighter days of the band's youth. The song's verses illustrate an idiosyncratic worldview, one flanked by surfboards and discotheques. They celebrate a scene set in the middle of a hot summer in New York.

== Critical reception ==
Greg Beets of The Austin Chronicle called the song "backhanded genius". AllMusic's Stephen Thomas Erlewine cites "Rockaway Beach" as being among the "finest set of songs" Ramones had written for Rocket to Russia. He characterized its musical composition as "teeming with irresistibly catchy hooks". Gina Boldman, from the same publication, praised the song's "mindless, bopping opening" and summarized, "One of the group's most carefree and breezy songs ... The imagery puts you right in the middle of a hot New York summer in the mid-to-late '70s, and it's easy to feel as jubilant as the song (and Ramone) does. Time Out's Steve Smith hailed the song as a "bubblegum masterpiece". Music critic Robert Christgau regarded "Rockaway Beach" as an "actual potential hit". In his review of the anniversary edition, Zachary Hopskins from Slant Magazine ranks the song one of the group's "stone-cold classics: as likely to put a smile on one’s face and a bounce in one’s Chucks in 2017 as they were 40 years ago".

== Chart performance ==
"Rockaway Beach" has since become the Ramones' highest charting single, peaking at number sixty-six on Billboard Hot 100.

== Other uses ==
- The song was used in 2002 in the What's New, Scooby-Doo? episode "She Sees Sea Monsters by the Sea Shore".
- In June 2013, the song was used in a radio ad campaign sponsored by Queens Economic Development Corporation to promote recovery from Hurricane Sandy by drawing New Yorkers back to Rockaway Beach.
