= Johnny Ramone =

American guitarist (1948–2004)

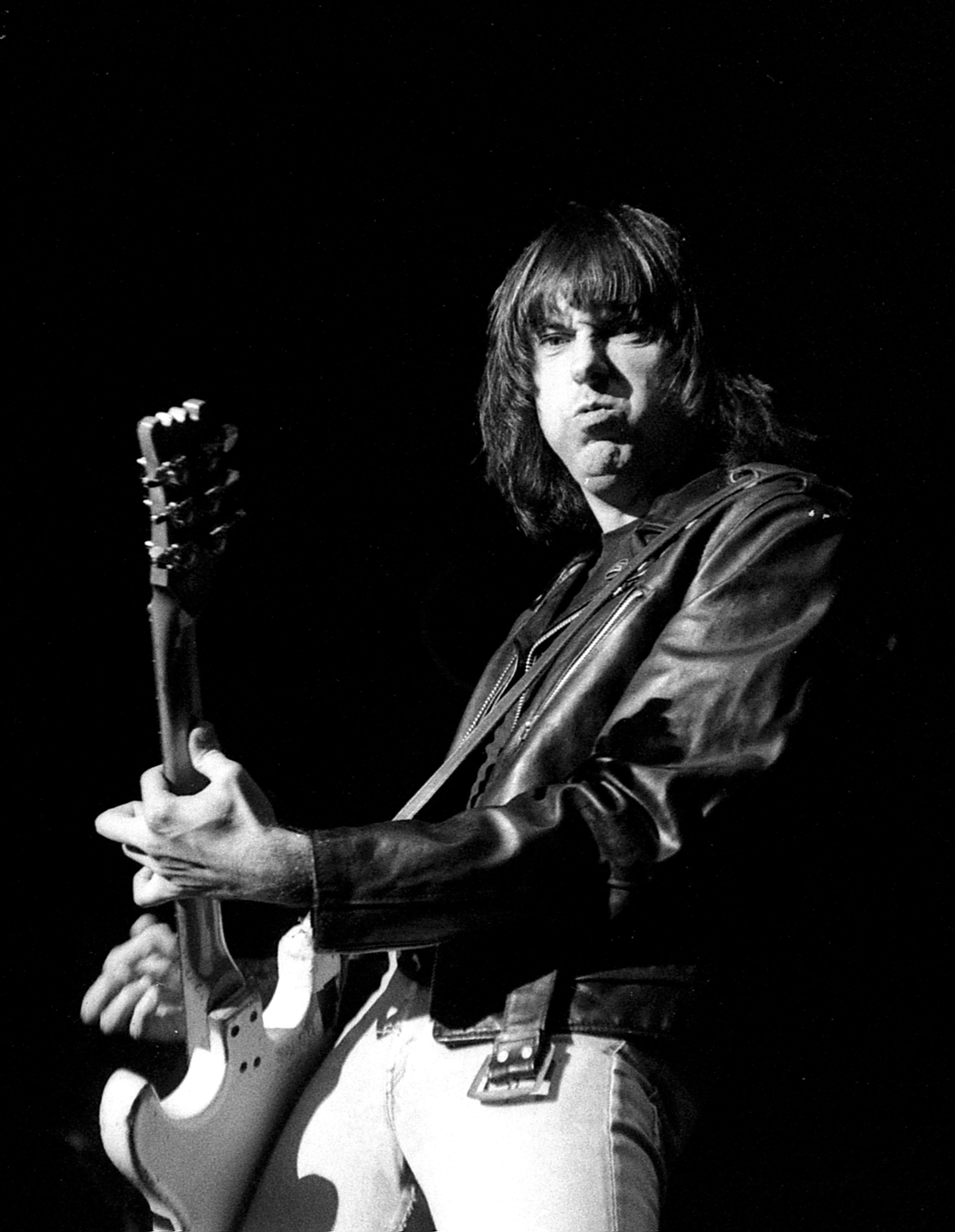
- Ramone performing in 1990

Background information
- Also known as: Johnny Ramone
- Born: John William Cummings; October 8, 1948; Queens, New York City, U.S.
- Died: September 15, 2004 (aged 55) Los Angeles, California, U.S.
- Genre: Punk rock
- Occupation: Guitarist
- Years active: 1965–1996
- Formerly of: Ramones
- Website: johnnyramone.com
- Spouse: Linda Daniele (m. 1984)

Signature
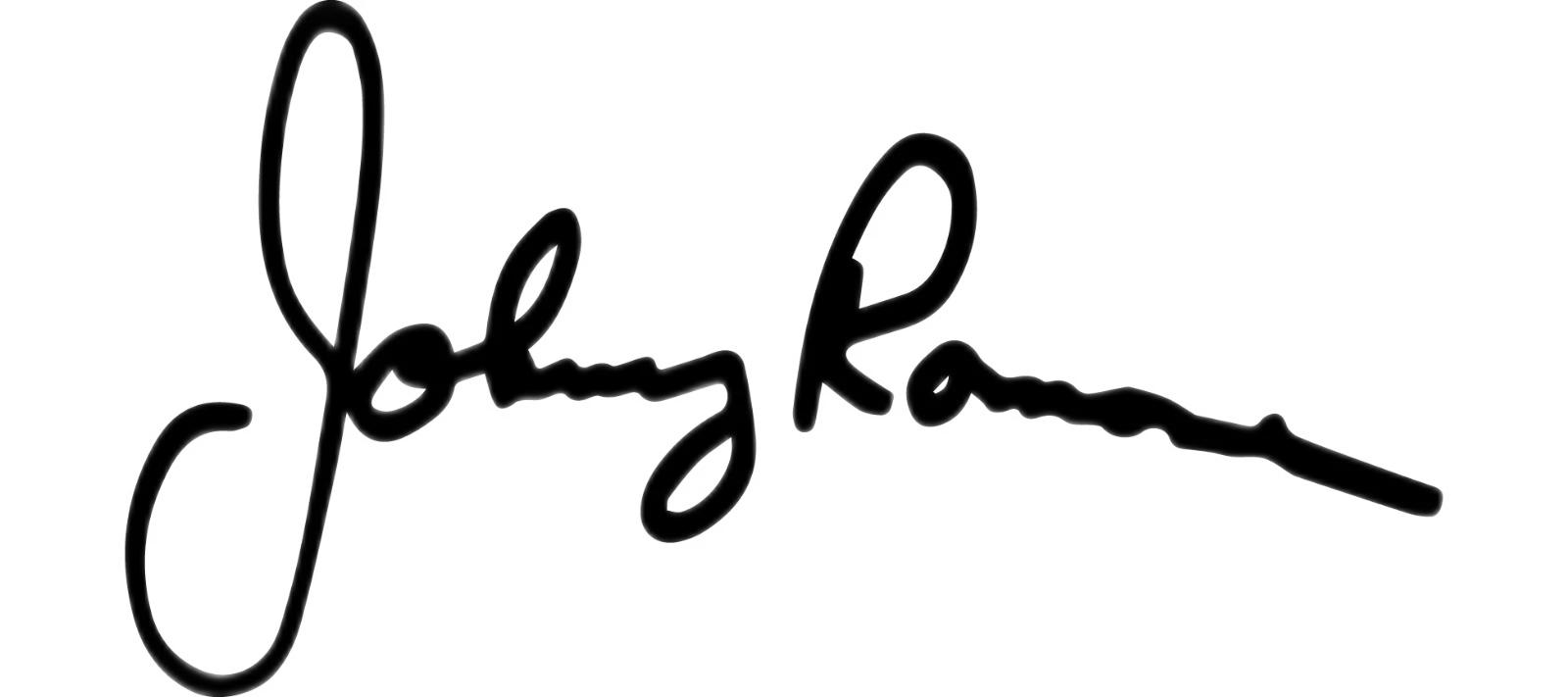

John William Cummings (October 8, 1948 – September 15, 2004), better known by his stage name Johnny Ramone, was an American musician who was the guitarist and a founding member of the Ramones, a band that helped pioneer the punk movement. The band was inducted into the Rock and Roll Hall of Fame in 2002. Until the band's disbandment in 1996, Johnny, along with the lead vocalist Joey Ramone, were the only two original members who stayed since its inception, and appeared on every one of the band’s albums.

In 2009, Ramone appeared on Time's list of "The 10 Greatest Electric-Guitar Players". He ranked No. 8 on Spin's 2012 list of the "100 Greatest Guitarists of All Time" and No. 28 on Rolling Stone's similarly titled 2015 list. Alongside his music career, Ramone appeared in nearly a dozen films, in documentaries, and on television. Ramone's autobiography, Commando, was released posthumously in 2012.

== Early life ==
John William Cummings was born in Queens, New York City, on October 8, 1948, the only child of Estelle, a waitress of Polish and Ukrainian descent, and Francis William Cummings, a construction worker (a steamfitter) of Irish descent. He was raised in the Forest Hills neighborhood of Queens, where he grew up absorbing rock music. Cummings's father was a strict disciplinarian. Johnny is quoted as saying: "My father would get on these tangents about how he never missed a day's work. I broke my big toe the day I had to go pitch a Little League game and he's going, 'What are you – a baby? What did I do, raise a baby? You go play.' And even though my toe was broken I had to go pitch the game anyway. It was terrible."

As a teenager, Cummings played in a band called the Tangerine Puppets alongside future Ramones drummer Tamás Erdélyi (better known as Tommy Ramone). Cummings was known as a "greaser", though he was later described as a tie-dye-wearing Stooges fan. He was a lifelong New York Yankees fan. Cummings also worked as a plumber with his father before the Ramones became successful. He said he attended Peekskill Military Academy in Peekskill, New York.

== Career ==
=== Ramones ===
Cummings met future bandmate Douglas Colvin, later to become Dee Dee Ramone, in the early 1970s while delivering dry cleaning. They would eat lunch together and discuss their mutual love of bands like The Stooges and MC5. Together they went to Manny's Music in New York City in January 1974, where Johnny bought a used blue Mosrite Ventures II guitar for just over $54 (approximately equivalent to $353 in 2025). On the same trip, Dee Dee bought a Danelectro bass. They collaborated with future bandmate Jeffrey Hyman, later to become Joey Ramone, to form the Ramones with mutual friend Richie Stern initially on bass and Dee Dee also on guitar prior to Stern’s departure due to his musical ineptitude following a handful of rehearsals. Tamás "Thomas" Erdélyi, subsequently known as Tommy Ramone, joined the Ramones in the summer of that year after public auditions failed to produce a satisfactory drummer. The members of the band each used the "Ramone" surname, and Cummings became known as Johnny Ramone.

The Ramones played before an audience for the first time on March 30, 1974, at Performance Studios. The band's debut album, Ramones, was greeted positively by rock critics. The album was not a commercial success, reaching only number 111 on the Billboard album chart. Their next two albums, Leave Home and Rocket to Russia, were released in 1977. Rocket to Russia was the band's highest-charting album to date, reaching number 49 on the Billboard 200. In 1978, the band released their fourth studio album, Road to Ruin. It failed to reach the Billboard Top 100. However, "I Wanna Be Sedated", which appeared both on the album and as a single, would become one of the band's best-known songs. The artwork on the album's cover was done by Punk magazine cofounder John Holmstrom.

After the band's movie debut in Roger Corman's Rock 'n' Roll High School (1979), producer Phil Spector became interested in the Ramones and produced their 1980 album End of the Century. There is a long-disputed rumor that during the recording sessions in Los Angeles, Spector held Johnny at gunpoint, forcing him to repeatedly play a riff.

Pleasant Dreams, the band's sixth album, was released in 1981. It continued the trend established by End of the Century, taking the band further from the raw punk sound of its early records. Johnny would contend in retrospect that this direction was a record company decision, a continued futile attempt to get airplay on American radio.

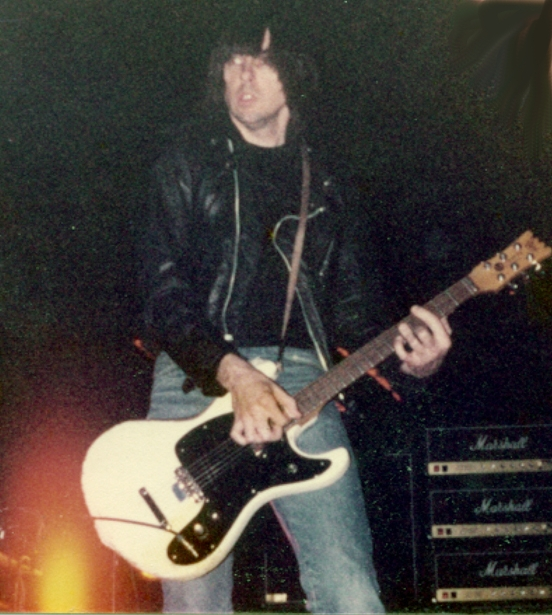
Ramone playing at The Eagle Hippodrome, 1983

Subterranean Jungle, produced by Ritchie Cordell and Glen Kolotkin, was released in 1983. According to Trouser Press, it brought the band "back to where they once belonged: junky '60s pop adjusted for current tastes", which among other things meant "easing off the breakneck rhythm that was once Ramones dogma."

Johnny Ramone was responsible for initiating one of the major sources of animosity within the band when he began dating and later married Linda Daniele, who had previously dated Joey Ramone. Though the band remained together for years after this incident, relations between Johnny and Joey remained strained.

The Ramones performed 2,263 concerts, touring virtually nonstop for 22 years. On August 6, 1996, after a tour with the Lollapalooza music festival, they played a farewell concert at the Palace in Hollywood and disbanded.

Recognition of the band's importance grew over the years. The Ramones ranked number 26 in Rolling Stone magazine's list of the "100 Greatest Artists of All Time" and number 17 in VH1's "100 Greatest Artists of Hard Rock". In 2002, the Ramones were ranked the second-greatest band of all time by Spin, trailing only The Beatles. On March 18, 2002, the original four members and Tommy's replacement on drums, Marky Ramone, were inducted into the Rock and Roll Hall of Fame in their first year of eligibility. In 2011, the group was awarded a Grammy Lifetime Achievement Award.

=== Acting ===
Alongside his music career, Johnny Ramone appeared in nearly a dozen films (including Rock 'n' Roll High School) and documentaries. He also made television appearances in such shows as The Simpsons (1F01 "Rosebud", 1993) and Space Ghost Coast to Coast (Episode 5 "Bobcat").

In 2001, Johnny appeared in an English-language Spanish science fiction film called Stranded.

== Guitar technique ==
Being almost exclusively a rhythm guitarist, Johnny Ramone mostly used downstrokes throughout his career. He also used full, six-string barre chords and occasional power chords. This unusual technique, combined with his characteristic tone from his guitar amp, produced a guitar sound that was far more aggressive and rhythmic than that of his contemporaries, heavily influencing early punk rock groups and later guitarists in other genres.

I guess that before me, people played downstrokes for brief periods in a song, rather than the whole song through. It was just a timing mechanism for me.

— Johnny Ramone

For example, Dictators bassist Andy Shernoff states that Jimmy Page's rapid downstroke guitar riff in "Communication Breakdown", an influential song that contained elements of protopunk, was an inspiration for Johnny Ramone's downstroke guitar style. Ramone, who has described Page as "probably the greatest guitarist who ever lived", stated in the documentary Ramones: The True Story that he improved his downstroke style by playing the song over and over again for the bulk of his early career. Recording engineer Ed Stasium once stated "Johnny makes it sound simple, but I can't do it, and I bet Eddie Van Halen can't. Not for an hour!". His style has also been an influence on many alternative rock bands, as well as on thrash metal performers such as James Hetfield and Kirk Hammett of Metallica, Dave Mustaine of Megadeth and Scott Ian of Anthrax. Paul Gilbert has cited Johnny Ramone as one of his influences. Hammett stated using downstrokes so prominently emphasizes the higher-end frequency of the guitar's sound, and reduces a percussive effect which happens during upstrokes. An article in Premier Guitar notes how Johnny's use of barre chords across all six strings helped create more fullness and harmonic depth, when compared to power chords using only two or three strings (though depending on hand position, he sometimes muted the top or bottom strings during some barre chords).

Johnny saw himself as a rhythm guitarist and consequently never attempted to gain much skill performing guitar solos. However, Johnny did play simple lead guitar parts on a small number of Ramones recordings, such as "Now I Wanna Sniff Some Glue" and "California Sun". A brief guitar solo can also be found on live versions of "I Can't Make It on Time", in which Johnny plays a descending E minor pentatonic scale, ending it off with a whole step bend. However, the infrequent guitar solos on the group's studio albums were usually overdubbed by Tommy Ramone, Ed Stasium, Daniel Rey, Walter Lure and other uncredited guests. Most of these small leads were only added in an attempt to give certain songs a more commercial appeal; they were not common on the band's albums.

Johnny initially selected a Mosrite guitar "because it was the cheapest guitar in the store" and the instrument was not considered trendy or fashionable: "I also didn’t wanna get a guitar that everybody else was using." Journalist Everett True later summarized Johnny's philosophy as "all [Electric] guitars sound the same when turned up loud enough", and Mosrites were his main instruments because their lightweight body and thin neck suited his playing style. Occasionally, he was known to use guitars by Fender, Hamer or other companies. But these guitars were often backups or for occasional studio work, and he overwhelmingly preferred Mosrite.

== Politics ==
Johnny was one of the few conservatives in the punk rock community: a staunch supporter of the Republican Party and an advocate of American Exceptionalism.

In 1985, Joey Ramone, Dee Dee Ramone and Jean Beauvoir composed the song "Bonzo Goes to Bitburg" for the Ramones, which criticized President Ronald Reagan's controversial visit to a German military cemetery. The song was rush-released as a single in the UK, but the song was retitled "My Brain Is Hanging Upside Down" when it appeared on the album Animal Boy (1986). Johnny later said, "They couldn't talk about my favorite president like that. So we agreed to use another title."

Johnny made his political affiliation known to the world in 2002, when the Ramones were inducted into the Rock and Roll Hall of Fame. After thanking all who made the honor possible, he said, "God bless President Bush, and God bless America".

In a 2003 interview, Johnny reiterated, "I think Reagan was the best President in my life." He also stated that he believed that "punk is right wing", adding that "when you think of who punks are, they're greasers, people who didn't fit in, but they didn't back down either. Who above all, love America."

Johnny was quoted by The Guardian as saying, "I figure people drift toward liberalism at a young age, and I always hope that they change when they see how the world really is."

== Personal life ==
Johnny's early adulthood was marked by bouts of delinquency which he stated were inexplicable at the time. "I didn't become a delinquent until I got out of high school. I had a two-year run. I'd go out and hit kids and take their money and rob everybody's pocketbooks. Just being bad every minute of the day. It was terrible. I don't know what my problem was. Things that were funny to me at the time were horrible... At about 20 years old, I stopped drinking and doing drugs, got a job and tried to be normal."

Johnny married his first wife, Rosana Cummings, in 1972. However, by 1976, they split up.

In 1983, Johnny was severely injured in a fight with Seth Macklin of the band Sub Zero Construction. He was saved by emergency brain surgery and, according to a reporter at the time, "got better fast. He plays the same but his hair is a little shorter." Johnny later said, "I was ready to play in three months, and our next album would be titled Too Tough to Die".

Johnny married his second wife, Linda, in 1984 at the office of the city clerk in New York City. She had originally dated Joey Ramone, but left him for Johnny. Joey and Johnny continued to tour as the Ramones after this, but their relationship worsened. However, despite reports that they had stopped talking to each other altogether, Johnny talks fondly of Joey in his book Commando. Years later, when Joey was in the hospital dying of lymphoma, Johnny refused to telephone him. Johnny later discussed this incident in the film End of the Century: The Story of the Ramones, saying an attempt at such a reunion would have been futile. He did add that he was very depressed after Joey's death. When pressed, he acknowledged that this was because of the bond forged by the band. In their road manager Monte Melnick's book about his time with the Ramones, Johnny is quoted as having said, "I'm not doing anything without him. I felt that was it. He was my partner. Me and him. I miss that."

Johnny was Catholic. Though he considered himself religious, he did not attend church due to physical abuse he suffered at the hands of nuns as a youth.

Johnny also was an avid collector of baseball cards and movie posters.

== Death ==
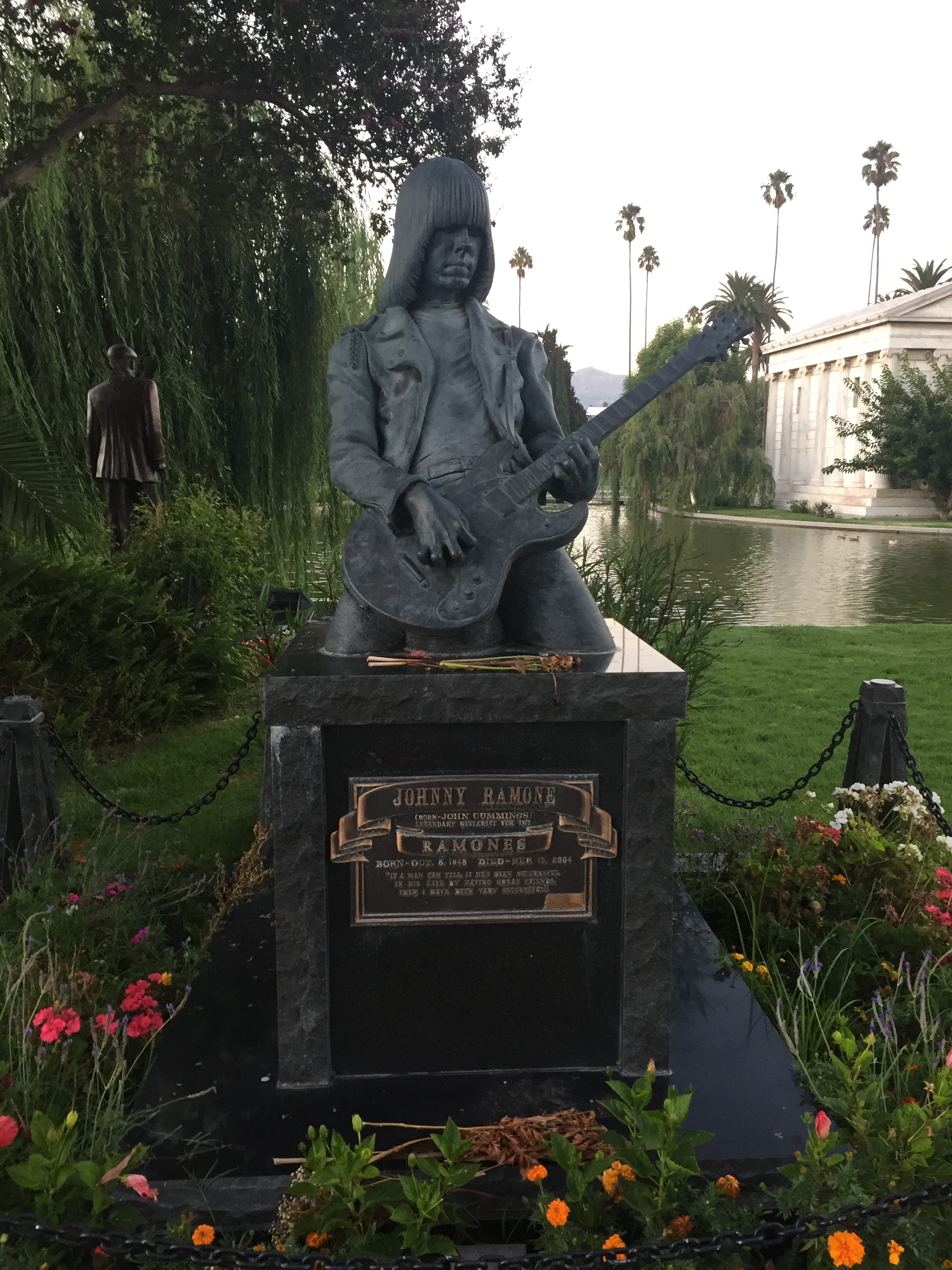
Ramone's monument at Hollywood Forever Cemetery

Johnny Ramone died in his Los Angeles home on September 15, 2004, at the age of 55, following a five-year battle with prostate cancer. Many of his friends and musical contemporaries came to pay their respects. His wife Linda kept his ashes, though there is a cenotaph monument to Ramone at Hollywood Forever Cemetery in Hollywood, California.

=== Posthumous honors ===
Prior to Johnny's death in 2004, Arturo Vega had suggested a monument to Johnny. "I suggested some kind of monument ... He agreed right away. The monument was my idea; the statue was his idea," relayed Vega. Shortly after Johnny's death, his wife Linda oversaw the creation and erection of an 8 ft tall bronze memorial statue of Johnny at Hollywood Forever. It was designed by Wayne Toth, based on a gift given by Rob Zombie, and was unveiled at a ceremony coordinated by Linda on January 14, 2005. Many of Johnny and Linda's friends spoke at the ceremony, including Zombie, Nicolas Cage, Eddie Vedder, Tommy Ramone, C.J. Ramone, Vincent Gallo, John Frusciante, Seymour Stein, Pete Yorn and others.

In 2006, the remake of the horror film The Wicker Man was dedicated to Johnny Ramone's memory, as he was a close friend of the film's producer and star, Nicolas Cage. The lyrics for Pearl Jam's 2006 single "Life Wasted" were written by Eddie Vedder in honor of Johnny Ramone while driving home from his funeral. Pearl Jam also made their first video in eight years for this song. The song "Come Back" from Pearl Jam is also related to the death of Johnny Ramone.

Rolling Stone ranked Johnny Ramone 16th on its 2009 list of the Greatest Guitarists of All Time. That year, Time magazine included him on its list of the "10 Best Electric Guitarists of All Time".

An annual Johnny Ramone memorial is held every year in Hollywood Forever Cemetery. The Annual Johnny Ramone Tribute is presented by Linda Ramone and is held as a benefit for the Johnny Ramone cancer research fund which is led by Dr. David Agus at the USC Westside prostate cancer research center. The events have been attended by celebrities such as Vincent Gallo, Lisa Marie Presley, Priscilla Presley, Red Hot Chili Peppers, Chris Cornell, Eddie Vedder, Billie Joe Armstrong, Duff McKagan, Rob Zombie, Kirk Hammett, Steve Jones, and Traci Lords. Additional celebrities who have taken part in the events include John Waters, Rose McGowan, Henry Rollins and Johnny Depp.

Lisa Marie Presley recorded a cover of the Ramones' song "Here Today, Gone Tomorrow" on her 2005 album Now What. She printed in the liner notes of the CD:

Five years ago, Johnny Ramone picked me to sing Here Today, Gone Tomorrow. He wanted me to sing it on a Ramones tribute record where many of his friends and other artists were covering his songs. Johnny was one of my best friends, and I promised him before he passed away that I would include that song on my record. He was very sick but wanted to play the guitar on it as long as he was sitting down. Unfortunately, while we were recording the basic track, he died.

On September 15, 2022, John Frusciante performed a cover of the Ramones' song "I Remember You" during the Red Hot Chili Peppers show in Orlando to honor Johnny on the 18th anniversary of his death.
