= List of White Zombie and Rob Zombie band members =

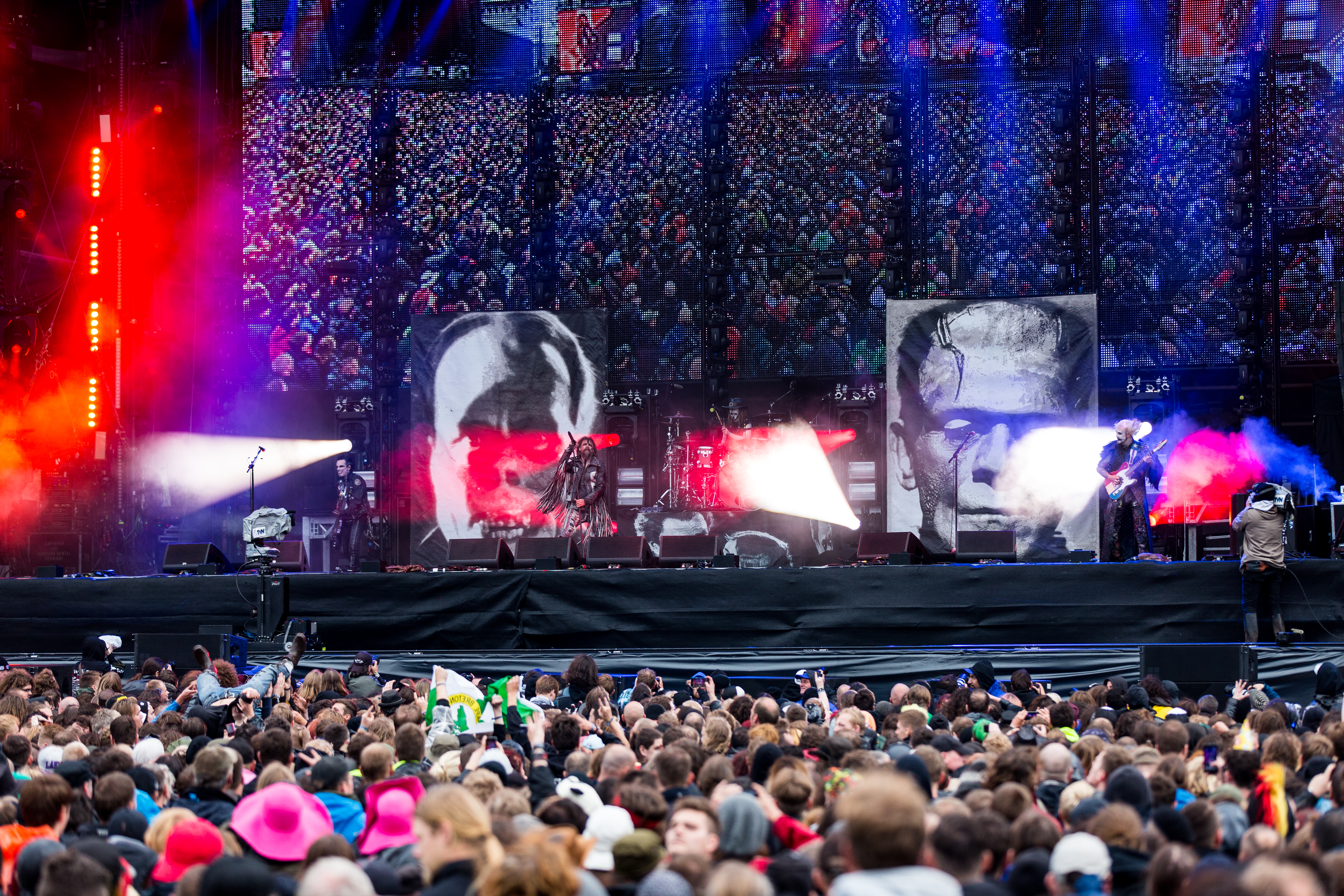
Rob Zombie's band onstage in 2015

Rob Zombie (Born Robert Cummings) is an American heavy metal vocalist. In 1985, he formed the band White Zombie with guitarist Paul "Ena" Kostabi, bassist Sean Yseult and drummer Peter Landau. The group remained active until 1998, with its final lineup featuring Cummings and Yseult alongside guitarist Jay "J." Yuenger and drummer John Tempesta. In 1997, Zombie formed the first lineup of a solo band with Tempesta, guitarist Mike Riggs, and bassist Rob "Blasko" Nicholson. The current lineup of Rob Zombie's band includes Riggs, Blasko, and drummer Ryan Goff.

== History ==
=== White Zombie ===
White Zombie was formed in 1985 by vocalist Rob Zombie (then known as Rob Straker), guitarist Paul "Ena" Kostabi, bassist Sean Yseult and drummer Peter Landau, who recorded the group's debut EP Gods on Voodoo Moon that October. By early 1986, Kostabi and Landau had been replaced by Tim Jeffs and Ivan de Prume, respectively, for the recording of Pig Heaven/Slaughter the Grey and their first live performances. After touring for around a year, Jeffs was replaced by Tom Five (real name Tom Guay), who debuted on the band's third release Psycho-Head Blowout. The group released their debut full-length album Soul-Crusher at the end of 1987, touring until the following summer before Guay was replaced by John Ricci. With their new guitarist, White Zombie recorded their second album Make Them Die Slowly in November 1988. Ricci reportedly left on the last day of the album's recording, with Zombie claiming that "He didn't show up and nobody really cared." Make Them Die Slowly was released in February 1989.

Around the release of Make Them Die Slowly, Jay "J." Yuenger took over as White Zombie's guitarist. The new lineup issued the EP God of Thunder later in 1989, followed by third album La Sexorcisto: Devil Music Volume One in 1992, shortly after which de Prume left the band and was replaced by Phil Buerstatte. After contributing to the band's recordings of "I Am Hell" for The Beavis and Butt-Head Experience, "Children of the Grave" for Nativity in Black: A Tribute to Black Sabbath and "Feed the Gods" for the Airheads soundtrack, Buerstatte left White Zombie. He was replaced temporarily for a Japanese tour in May 1994 by Mark Poland. A few months later, former Exodus and Testament drummer John Tempesta took over permanently. White Zombie released its final album Astro-Creep: 2000 – Songs of Love, Destruction and Other Synthetic Delusions of the Electric Head in 1995. After a final tour which finished in August 1996, the group disbanded. However, the breakup was not made official until September 1998.

=== Rob Zombie ===
Rob Zombie began recording his debut solo album Hellbilly Deluxe in 1997, when White Zombie were technically still together. The core personnel for the recording included White Zombie drummer John Tempesta, plus guitarist Mike Riggs and bassist Rob "Blasko" Nicholson. This lineup remained intact for the 2001 follow-up The Sinister Urge, before Zombie took a break to focus on his filmmaking career, leading to the departures of Riggs and Tempesta who formed Scum of the Earth. In March 2005, Rob Zombie announced a new lineup featuring guitarist John 5 (real name John Lowery), bassist Blasko and drummer Tommy Clufetos. The new lineup released Educated Horses in March 2006, before Blasko left in May to join Ozzy Osbourne's band, replaced by Piggy D. (real name Matthew Montgomery).

In March 2010, after the release of Zombie's fourth solo album Hellbilly Deluxe 2, Clufetos was replaced by Slipknot drummer Joey Jordison after leaving to join Blasko in Ozzy Osbourne's band. During his short tenure with the band, Jordison recorded drums for three tracks released on the reissue of Hellbilly Deluxe 2 in September 2010. In February 2011, Jordison was replaced by outgoing Marilyn Manson drummer Ginger Fish (real name Kenneth Wilson). With this current lineup, Rob Zombie has released three more studio albums: Venomous Rat Regeneration Vendor in 2013, The Electric Warlock Acid Witch Satanic Orgy Celebration Dispenser in 2016 and The Lunar Injection Kool Aid Eclipse Conspiracy in 2021. In October 2022 it was announced that John 5 had left the band to become the touring guitarist for Mötley Crüe following the retirement of Mick Mars and that original guitarist Mike Riggs has returned. On January 30, 2024, Piggy D. announced that he left the band after 18 years. Later that day, it was announced that Blasko had returned. After the release of 2026's The Great Satan, Ryan Goff replaced Fish on drums (Goff had previously contributed additional drums to The Great Satan).

== Members ==
=== Current ===
| Image | Name | Years active | Instruments | Release contributions |
|---|---|---|---|---|
| | Rob Zombie (Robert Cummings) | 1985–present | lead vocals | all White Zombie and Rob Zombie releases |
| | Mike Riggs | 1997–2003; 2022–present | guitars; backing vocals | Hellbilly Deluxe (1998); The Sinister Urge (2001); The Great Satan (2026) |
| | Rob "Blasko" Nicholson | 1997–2006; 2024–present | bass; backing vocals | Hellbilly Deluxe (1998); The Sinister Urge (2001); Educated Horses (2006); The Great Satan (2026) |
| | Ryan Goff | 2026–present | drums | The Great Satan (2026) |

=== Former ===
| Image | Name | Years active | Instruments | Release contributions |
|---|---|---|---|---|
| | Sean Yseult (Shauna Reynolds) | 1985–1998 | bass | all White Zombie releases |
| | Paul "Ena" Kostabi | 1985–1986 | guitars | Gods on Voodoo Moon (1985) |
| | Peter Landau | 1985–1986 | drums | Gods on Voodoo Moon (1985) |
| | Ivan de Prume | 1986–1992 | drums | all White Zombie releases from Pig Heaven/Slaughter the Grey (1986) to La Sexorcisto: Devil Music Volume One (1992) |
| | Tim Jeffs | 1986–1987 | guitars | Pig Heaven/Slaughter the Grey (1986) |
| | Tom Five (Thomas Guay) | 1987–1988 | guitars | Psycho-Head Blowout (1987); Soul-Crusher (1987) |
| | John Ricci | 1988 | guitars | Make Them Die Slowly (1989) |
| | Jay "J." Yuenger | 1989–1998 | guitars | all White Zombie releases from God of Thunder (1989) onwards |
| | Phil Buerstatte | 1992–1994 (died 2013) | drums | "I Am Hell" (1993); "Children of the Grave" (1994); "Feed the Gods" (1994) |
| | Mark Poland | 1994 (touring) | drums | none |
| | John Tempesta | 1994–2003 | drums; backing vocals | all White Zombie releases from Astro-Creep: 2000 (1995) onwards; Hellbilly Deluxe (1998); The Sinister Urge (2001) |
| | Tommy Clufetos | 2005–2010 | drums; backing vocals | Educated Horses (2006); Zombie Live (2007); Hellbilly Deluxe 2 (2010) |
| | John 5 (John Lowery) | 2005–2022 | guitars; backing vocals; occasional bass | all Rob Zombie releases from Educated Horses (2006) to The Lunar Injection Kool Aid Eclipse Conspiracy (2021) |
| | Piggy D. (Matthew Montgomery) | 2006–2024 | bass; backing vocals | all Rob Zombie releases from Zombie Live (2007) to The Lunar Injection Kool Aid Eclipse Conspiracy (2021) |
| | Joey Jordison | 2010–2011 (died 2021) | drums | Hellbilly Deluxe 2 (2010) – three reissue bonus tracks |
| | Ginger Fish (Kenneth Wilson) | 2011–2026 | drums | all Rob Zombie releases from Venomous Rat Regeneration Vendor (2013) to The Great Satan (2026) |

== Lineups ==
=== White Zombie ===
| Period | Members | Releases |
|---|---|---|
| 1985 – early 1986 | Rob Straker – vocals; Sean Yseult – bass; Ena Kostabi – guitars; Peter Landau – drums | Gods on Voodoo Moon (1985) |
| Early 1986 – early 1987 | Rob Straker – vocals; Sean Yseult – bass; Ivan de Prume – drums; Tim Jeffs – guitars | Pig Heaven/Slaughter the Grey (1986) |
| Early 1987 – June 1988 | Rob Straker – vocals; Sean Yseult – bass; Ivan de Prume – drums; Tom Five – guitars | Psycho-Head Blowout (1987); Soul-Crusher (1987) |
| July – November 1988 | Rob Zombie – vocals; Sean Yseult – bass; Ivan de Prume – drums; John Ricci – guitars | Make Them Die Slowly (1989) |
| Early 1989 – summer 1992 | Rob Zombie – vocals; Sean Yseult – bass; Ivan de Prume – drums; Jay Yuenger – guitars | God of Thunder (1989); La Sexorcisto (1992) |
| Summer 1992 – April 1994 | Rob Zombie – vocals; Sean Yseult – bass; Jay Yuenger – guitars; Phil Buerstatte – drums | "I Am Hell" (1993); "Children of the Grave" (1994); "Feed the Gods" (1994) |
| May 1994 | Rob Zombie – vocals; Sean Yseult – bass; Jay Yuenger – guitars; Mark Poland – drums (touring) | none – Japanese tour only |
| Summer 1994 – September 1998 | Rob Zombie – vocals; Sean Yseult – bass; Jay Yuenger – guitars; John Tempesta – drums | Astro-Creep: 2000 (1995); "The One" (1996); "I'm Your Boogieman" (1996); "Ratfinks, Suicide Tanks and Cannibal Girls" (1996) |

=== Rob Zombie ===
| Period | Members | Releases |
|---|---|---|
| August 1997 – late 2003 | Rob Zombie – lead vocals; John Tempesta – drums, backing vocals; Blasko – bass, backing vocals; Mike Riggs – guitars, backing vocals | Hellbilly Deluxe (1998); The Sinister Urge (2001) |
Band on hiatus late 2003 – March 2005
| March 2005 – May 2006 | Rob Zombie – lead vocals; Blasko – bass, backing vocals; John 5 – guitars, backing vocals; Tommy Clufetos – drums, backing vocals | Educated Horses (2006) |
| May 2006 – March 2010 | Rob Zombie – lead vocals; John 5 – guitars, backing vocals; Tommy Clufetos – drums, backing vocals; Piggy D. – bass, backing vocals | Zombie Live (2007); Hellbilly Deluxe 2 (2010) |
| March 2010 – February 2011 | Rob Zombie – lead vocals; John 5 – guitars, backing vocals; Piggy D. – bass, backing vocals; Joey Jordison – drums | Hellbilly Deluxe 2 (2010) – reissue bonus tracks |
| February 2011 – October 2022 | Rob Zombie – lead vocals; John 5 – guitars, backing vocals; Piggy D. – bass, backing vocals; Ginger Fish – drums | Venomous Rat Regeneration Vendor (2013); The Zombie Horror Picture Show (2014); Spookshow International Live (2015); The Electric Warlock Acid Witch Satanic Orgy Celebration Dispenser (2016); Astro-Creep: 2000 Live (2018); "Helter Skelter" (2018); The Lunar Injection Kool Aid Eclipse Conspiracy (2021) |
| October 2022 – January 2024 | Rob Zombie – lead vocals; Piggy D. – bass, backing vocals; Ginger Fish – drums; Mike Riggs – guitars, backing vocals | |
| January 2024 – July 2026 | Rob Zombie – lead vocals; Ginger Fish – drums; Mike Riggs – guitars, backing vocals; Blasko – bass, backing vocals | The Great Satan (2026) |
| July 2026 – present | Rob Zombie – lead vocals; Mike Riggs – guitars, backing vocals; Blasko – bass, backing vocals; Ryan Goff – drums | |
