= White Zombie discography =

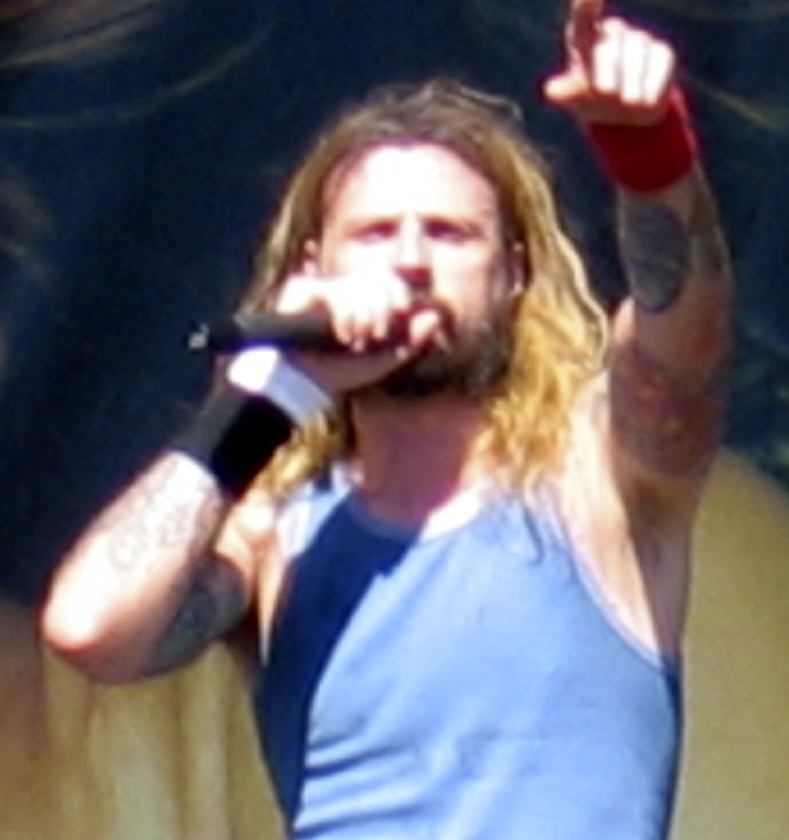
- Frontman Rob Zombie
- Studio albums: 4
- Extended plays: 4
- Soundtrack albums: 9
- Compilation albums: 2
- Tribute albums: 1
- Singles: 12
- Video albums: 4
- Music videos: 9
- Remix albums: 1

The discography for the American heavy metal band White Zombie.

== Albums ==
=== Studio albums ===
List of studio albums, with selected chart positions and certifications
Title	Album details	Peak chart positions									Certifications
Title	Album details	US	AUS	AUT	BEL (FL)	CHE	GER	NZ	SWE	UK	Certifications
Soul-Crusher	Released: November 1987; Label: Silent Explosion; Format: CS, LP	—	—	—	—	—	—	—	—	—	
Make Them Die Slowly	Released: March 22, 1989; Label: Caroline; Format: CD, CS, LP	—	—	—	—	—	—	—	—	—	
La Sexorcisto: Devil Music Volume One	Released: March 17, 1992; Label: Geffen; Format: CD, CS, LP	26	—	—	—	—	—	—	—	—	US: 2× Platinum; CAN: Gold
Astro-Creep: 2000	Released: April 11, 1995; Label: Geffen; Format: CD, CS, LP	6	16	26	46	40	57	16	30	25	US: 2× Platinum; CAN: Platinum; UK: Gold
"—" denotes a release that did not chart.

=== Remix albums ===
List of remix albums, with selected chart positions and certifications
Title	Album details	Peak chart positions					Certifications
Title	Album details	US	AUS	NZ	SWE	UK	Certifications
Nightcrawlers	Released: October 6, 1992; Label: Geffen; Format: CD	—	—	—	—	—	
Supersexy Swingin' Sounds	Released: August 15, 1996; Label: Geffen; Format: CD, CS, LP	17	49	29	54	32	US: Gold; CAN: Gold; UK: Gold
"—" denotes a release that did not chart.

=== Compilation albums ===
List of compilation albums
Title	Album details
Let Sleeping Corpses Lie	Released: November 25, 2008; Label: Geffen; Format: CD
It Came from N.Y.C.	Released: June 3, 2016; Label: Numero Group; Format: CD, LP

== Extended plays ==
List of extended plays
Title	EP details
Gods on Voodoo Moon	Released: November 1985; Label: self-released; Format: CS, LP
Pig Heaven / Slaughter the Grey	Released: May 1986; Label: self-released; Format: LP
Psycho-Head Blowout	Released: May 1987; Label: Silent Explosion; Format: LP
God of Thunder	Released: October 1989; Label: Caroline; Format: LP

== Singles ==
=== Official singles ===
List of singles, with selected chart positions, showing year released and album name
Year	Song	Peak positions						Album
Year	Song	Hot 100 Airplay	US Alt.	US Main.	AUS	NZ	UK	Album
1993	"Thunder Kiss '65"	—	—	26	—	47	—	La Sexorcisto
1994	"Black Sunshine"	—	—	39	—	—	—	La Sexorcisto
1995	"More Human than Human"	53	7	10	37	—	51	Astro-Creep: 2000
1995	"Electric Head Pt. 2 (The Ecstasy)"	—	—	27	95	—	31	Astro-Creep: 2000
1996	"Super-Charger Heaven"	—	—	39	—	—	—	Astro-Creep: 2000
"—" denotes a release that did not chart.

=== Promotional singles ===
List of singles showing year released and album name
Year	Song	Album
1993	"I Am Hell"	The Beavis and Butt-Head Experience
1994	"Children of the Grave"	Nativity in Black
1994	"Feed the Gods"	Airheads Soundtrack
1995	"Real Solution #9"	Astro-Creep: 2000
1996	"The One"	Escape from L.A.
1996	"I'm Your Boogieman"	The Crow: City of Angels
1996	"Ratfinks, Suicide Tanks and Cannibal Girls"	Beavis and Butt-Head Do America

== Music videos ==
List of music videos, showing year released and director
Title	Year	Director(s)
"Thunder Kiss '65"	1992	Juliet Cuming
"Black Sunshine"	1992	Paul Andresen & George Dougherty
"Welcome to Planet Motherfucker"	1993	Cecilia Miniucchi
"Feed the Gods"	1994	Rob Zombie & George Dougherty
"More Human Than Human"	1995	Rob Zombie
"Super-Charger Heaven"	1995	Rob Zombie
"Electric Head, Pt. 2 (The Ecstasy)"	1995	Rob Zombie
"I'm Your Boogieman"	1996	Rob Zombie
"The One"	1996	Rob Zombie

== Bibliography ==
- "White Zombie > Discography". Allmusic.
