= Zombie Kiss =

Live album by White Zombie
- Released: 1990
- Recorded: 1990 at CBGB, New York City
- Genre: Groove metal
- Length: 9:00
- Label: Caroline
- Producer: White Zombie

White Zombie chronology
God of Thunder (1989)	Zombie Kiss (1990)	La Sexorcisto: Devil Music, Vol. 1 (1992)

Professional ratings
Review scores
Source	Rating
Allmusic	3/5 stars

Zombie Kiss is a live EP by the band White Zombie.

== Music ==
This EP was recorded live at New York's CBGB in early 1990 supporting their God of Thunder EP. This album features two tracks, God of Thunder and Thrust!, the latter of which would be on their next album La Sexorcisto: Devil Music, Vol. 1.

== Track listing ==
No.	Title	Lyrics	Music	Length
1.	"God of Thunder"	Paul Stanley	Paul Stanley	3:52
2.	"Thrust!"	Rob Zombie	White Zombie	4:55

== Song information ==
=== God of Thunder ===
A cover of the Kiss song originally from their 1976 album Destroyer.

=== Thrust! ===
Thrust would appear on their major label debut La Sexorcisto: Devil Music, Vol. 1 album.

== Personnel ==
=== Band members ===
- Ivan de Prume – drums
- Sean Yseult – bass, art direction
- Jay Yuenger – guitar
- Rob Zombie – Vocals, Lyricist, art direction
