= Let Sleeping Corpses Lie =

Box set by White Zombie
- Released: November 25, 2008
- Recorded: 1985–1996
- Genre: Noise rock; groove metal; industrial metal; alternative metal
- Length: 4:33:32 (CDs)
- Label: Geffen/UMe

White Zombie chronology
| Supersexy Swingin' Sounds (1996) | Let Sleeping Corpses Lie (2008) | It Came from N.Y.C. (2016) |

Professional ratings
Review scores
| Source | Rating |
|---|---|
| IGN | 8/10 |

Let Sleeping Corpses Lie is a career-spanning five-disc box set by American rock band White Zombie. It is named after the 1974 Italian horror film of the same name.

== Contents ==
The set contains a remaster of every album and E.P. released officially by White Zombie from 1985 to 1996, including six non-album songs, on four discs. However, not every song the band recorded can be found here: notably absent are "Black Friday" and "Dead or Alive", the two songs added to the 1989 cassette re-release of Gods on Voodoo Moon. The fifth disc is a DVD containing all nine of the band's music videos along with ten live performances.

== Track listing ==
Disc one
| No. | Title | From the album | Length |
|---|---|---|---|
| 1. | "Gentleman Junkie" | Gods on Voodoo Moon | 2:27 |
| 2. | "King of Souls" | Gods on Voodoo Moon | 2:21 |
| 3. | "Tales From the Scarecrowman" | Gods on Voodoo Moon | 3:26 |
| 4. | "Cat's Eye Resurrection" | Gods on Voodoo Moon | 1:46 |
| 5. | "Pig Heaven" | Pig Heaven | 4:49 |
| 6. | "Slaughter the Grey" | Pig Heaven | 4:16 |
| 7. | "Eighty-Eight" | Psycho-Head Blowout | 3:45 |
| 8. | "Fast Jungle" | Psycho-Head Blowout | 4:37 |
| 9. | "Gun Crazy" | Psycho-Head Blowout | 4:30 |
| 10. | "Kick" | Psycho-Head Blowout | 4:08 |
| 11. | "Memphis" | Psycho-Head Blowout | 3:39 |
| 12. | "Magdalene" | Psycho-Head Blowout | 4:14 |
| 13. | "True Crime" | Psycho-Head Blowout | 4:52 |

Disc two
| No. | Title | From the album | Length |
|---|---|---|---|
| 1. | "Ratmouth" | Soul-Crusher | 3:42 |
| 2. | "Shack of Hate" | Soul-Crusher | 2:54 |
| 3. | "Drowning the Colossus" | Soul-Crusher | 4:58 |
| 4. | "Crow III" | Soul-Crusher | 3:53 |
| 5. | "Die Zombie Die" | Soul-Crusher | 4:10 |
| 6. | "Skin" | Soul-Crusher | 3:40 |
| 7. | "Truck on Fire" | Soul-Crusher | 4:08 |
| 8. | "Future Shock" | Soul-Crusher | 3:12 |
| 9. | "Scumkill" | Soul-Crusher | 3:48 |
| 10. | "Diamond Ass" | Soul-Crusher | 3:47 |
| 11. | "Demonspeed" | Make Them Die Slowly | 5:20 |
| 12. | "Disaster Blaster" | Make Them Die Slowly | 6:05 |
| 13. | "Murderworld" | Make Them Die Slowly | 6:13 |
| 14. | "Revenge" | Make Them Die Slowly | 4:25 |
| 15. | "Acid Flesh" | Make Them Die Slowly | 5:32 |
| 16. | "Power Hungry" | Make Them Die Slowly | 5:15 |
| 17. | "Godslayer" | Make Them Die Slowly | 7:15 |

Disc three
| No. | Title | From the album | Length |
|---|---|---|---|
| 1. | "God of Thunder" (Kiss cover) | God of Thunder | 3:52 |
| 2. | "Love Razor" | God of Thunder | 5:22 |
| 3. | "Disaster Blaster II" | God of Thunder | 4:58 |
| 4. | "Welcome to Planet Motherfucker/Psychoholic Slag" | La Sexorcisto | 6:21 |
| 5. | "Knuckle Duster (Radio 1-A)" | La Sexorcisto | 0:24 |
| 6. | "Thunder Kiss '65" | La Sexorcisto | 3:54 |
| 7. | "Black Sunshine" | La Sexorcisto | 4:49 |
| 8. | "Soul-Crusher" | La Sexorcisto | 5:04 |
| 9. | "Cosmic Monsters Inc." | La Sexorcisto | 5:14 |
| 10. | "Spiderbaby (Yeah-Yeah-Yeah)" | La Sexorcisto | 5:02 |
| 11. | "I Am Legend" | La Sexorcisto | 5:09 |
| 12. | "Knuckle Duster (Radio 2-B)" | La Sexorcisto | 0:25 |
| 13. | "Thrust!" | La Sexorcisto | 5:06 |
| 14. | "One Big Crunch" | La Sexorcisto | 0:22 |
| 15. | "Grindhouse (A Go-Go)" | La Sexorcisto | 4:05 |
| 16. | "Starface" | La Sexorcisto | 5:02 |
| 17. | "Warp Asylum" | La Sexorcisto | 6:45 |
| 18. | "I Am Hell" | The Beavis and Butt-Head Experience | 3:43 |

Disc four
| No. | Title | From the album | Length |
|---|---|---|---|
| 1. | "Children of the Grave" (Black Sabbath cover) | Nativity in Black | 5:53 |
| 2. | "Feed the Gods" | Airheads Soundtrack | 4:06 |
| 3. | "Electric Head Pt. 1 (The Agony)" | Astro-Creep: 2000 | 4:54 |
| 4. | "Super-Charger Heaven" | Astro-Creep: 2000 | 3:37 |
| 5. | "Real Solution #9" | Astro-Creep: 2000 | 4:44 |
| 6. | "Creature of the Wheel" | Astro-Creep: 2000 | 3:25 |
| 7. | "Electric Head, Pt. 2 (The Ecstasy)" | Astro-Creep: 2000 | 3:54 |
| 8. | "Grease Paint and Monkey Brains" | Astro-Creep: 2000 | 3:49 |
| 9. | "I, Zombie" | Astro-Creep: 2000 | 3:32 |
| 10. | "More Human than Human" | Astro-Creep: 2000 | 4:29 |
| 11. | "El Phantasmo and the Chicken-Run Blast-O-Rama" | Astro-Creep: 2000 | 4:13 |
| 12. | "Blur the Technicolor" | Astro-Creep: 2000 | 4:09 |
| 13. | "Blood, Milk and Sky" | Astro-Creep: 2000 | 8:20 |
| 14. | "The One" | Escape from L.A. Soundtrack | 4:02 |
| 15. | "I'm Your Boogieman" (KC and the Sunshine Band cover) | The Crow: City of Angels Soundtrack | 4:29 |
| 16. | "Ratfinks, Suicide Tanks and Cannibal Girls" | Beavis and Butt-Head Do America Soundtrack | 3:53 |

Disc five (DVD)
| No. | Title | Type | Length |
|---|---|---|---|
| 1. | "Thunder Kiss '65" | Music video | 4:05 |
| 2. | "Black Sunshine" | Music video | 4:48 |
| 3. | "Welcome to Planet Motherfucker" | Music video | 3:08 |
| 4. | "Feed the Gods" | Music video | 4:00 |
| 5. | "More Human than Human" | Music video | 4:16 |
| 6. | "Super-Charger Heaven" | Music video | 3:40 |
| 7. | "Electric Head Pt. 2 (The Ecstasy)" | Music video | 4:10 |
| 8. | "I'm Your Boogieman" | Music video | 4:23 |
| 9. | "The One" | Music video | 3:19 |
| 10. | "Soul-Crusher" | Live performance | 4:18 |
| 11. | "Spiderbaby (Yeah Yeah Yeah)" | Live performance | 3:06 |
| 12. | "Thrust!" | Live performance | 3:14 |
| 13. | "Black Sunshine" | Live performance | 4:07 |
| 14. | "Cosmic Monsters Inc." | Live performance | 4:58 |
| 15. | "Thunder Kiss '65" | Live performance | 5:59 |
| 16. | "Electric Head Pt. 1 (The Agony)" | Live performance | 3:48 |
| 17. | "I Am Hell" | Live performance | 3:39 |
| 18. | "Welcome to Planet Motherfucker" | Live performance | 5:00 |
| 19. | "Creature of the Wheel" | Live performance | 3:39 |
| Total length: | | | 1:17:37 |

== Hidden gems ==
This DVD contains a few easter eggs.

- The full-length film White Zombie starring Béla Lugosi. To access the movie, select title 5 on your DVD remote or DVD menu.
- Alternative version of the "Thunder Kiss '65" music video that can be accessed by selecting angle 2 with DVD remote.
