= Super-Charger Hell =

2000 studio album by various artists

Compilation album by Various artists
- Released: May 9, 2000
- Recorded: 2000
- Genre: Heavy metal
- Length: 51:03
- Label: Dwell

Professional ratings
Review scores
| Source | Rating |
|---|---|
| AllMusic | 2.5/5 stars |

Super-Charger Hell is a tribute album dedicated to American heavy metal band White Zombie. The album name is a reference to the song "Super-Charger Heaven" from Astro-Creep 2000.

== Track listing ==
| No. | Title | Artist | Length |
|---|---|---|---|
| 1. | "I Am Legend" (originally released on La Sexorcisto) | Anarchuz | 5:06 |
| 2. | "Grindhouse (A Go-Go)" (originally released on La Sexorcisto) | Habeas Corpus | 3:45 |
| 3. | "Blood, Milk and Sky" (originally released on Astro-Creep 2000) | Silent Stream of Godless Elegy | 5:58 |
| 4. | "Black Sunshine" (originally released on La Sexorcisto) | Lesser Known | 4:51 |
| 5. | "Feed the Gods" (originally released on the Airheads Soundtrack) | Scary German Guy | 3:18 |
| 6. | "Thunder Kiss '65" (originally released on La Sexorcisto) | Catch 22 | 3:55 |
| 7. | "El Phantasmo and the Chicken-Run Blast-O-Rama" (originally released on Astro-Creep 2000) | Mind Phaser | 3:12 |
| 8. | "Creature of the Wheel" (originally released on Astro-Creep 2000) | Shallow of the Mundane | 2:14 |
| 9. | "Blur the Technicolor" (originally released on Astro-Creep 2000) | Disarray | 3:27 |
| 10. | "More Human than Human" (originally released on Astro-Creep 2000) | Shockwerks | 5:06 |
| 11. | "Super-Charger Heaven" (originally released on Astro-Creep 2000) | Daemos | 2:59 |
| 12. | "Warp Asylum" (originally released on La Sexorcisto) | Broke Box | 7:12 |
| Total length: | | | 51:03 |
