= It Came from N.Y.C. =

Box set by White Zombie
- Released: June 3, 2016
- Recorded: October 18, 1985 – October 1989
- Genre: Noise rock; garage rock; post-punk
- Label: Numero Group
- Producer: Kramer; Wharton Tiers; Bill Laswell; Daniel Rey; White Zombie

White Zombie chronology
Let Sleeping Corpses Lie (2008)	It Came from N.Y.C. (2016)

It Came from N.Y.C. is a three-disc or five-LP anthology by American rock band White Zombie, released on June 3, 2016, by The Numero Group. It collects all the material the group officially released between 1985 and 1989, including previously unreleased tracks from the Pig Heaven/Slaughter the Grey sessions. The audio was remastered by guitarist Jay Yuenger and the box set includes a one-hundred and eight page book comprising unpublished photos, anecdotes by the band and a twenty-thousand-word essay written by Pitchfork contributor Grayson Currin.

== Critical reception ==
Professional ratings
Review scores
Source	Rating
AllMusic	4/5 stars
Classic Rock	3.5/5 stars
New Noise Magazine	4/5 stars
Pitchfork	8.1/10

In writing for Pitchfork Media, Evan Minsker praised the staying power of the material, saying "This music pummels, and better still, it escapes the trap of self-seriousness that so many metal and noise bands seem to fall into. They had a sense of humor, which came through in their use of samples and in Zombie's deranged carnival barker performances." Awarding the set four out of five stars, Stephen Thomas Erlewine of AllMusic wrote that "The music itself feels somewhat cemented to time, but that's also its appeal: this was a band that came from a very specific time and place, and that era is celebrated here, providing an interesting footnote in '80s underground history."

== Track listing ==
All lyrics are written by Rob Zombie; all music is composed by White Zombie, except "God of Thunder" by Paul Stanley

Disc one
No.	Title	From the album (date)	Length
1.	"Gentleman Junkie"	Gods on Voodoo Moon (1985)	2:27
2.	"King of Souls"	Gods on Voodoo Moon (1985)	2:21
3.	"Tales from the Scarecrowman"	Gods on Voodoo Moon (1985)	3:26
4.	"Cat's Eye Resurrection"	Gods on Voodoo Moon (1985)	1:46
5.	"Black Friday"	Gods on Voodoo Moon (1985)	3:14
6.	"Dead or Alive"	Gods on Voodoo Moon (1985)	1:50
7.	"Pig Heaven"	Pig Heaven (1986)	4:49
8.	"Scarecrow #2"	Pig Heaven outtake (1986)	5:24
9.	"Red River Flow"	Pig Heaven outtake (1986)	5:33
10.	"Rain Insane" (omitted from vinyl release)	Pig Heaven outtake (1986)	7:49
11.	"Paradise Fireball"	Pig Heaven outtake (1986)	3:18
12.	"Slaughter the Grey"	Pig Heaven (1986)	4:33
13.	"Eighty-Eight"	Psycho-Head Blowout (1987)	3:45
14.	"Fast Jungle"	Psycho-Head Blowout (1987)	4:37
15.	"Gun Crazy"	Psycho-Head Blowout (1987)	4:30
16.	"Kick"	Psycho-Head Blowout (1987)	4:08
17.	"Memphis"	Psycho-Head Blowout (1987)	3:39
18.	"Magdalene"	Psycho-Head Blowout (1987)	4:14
19.	"True Crime"	Psycho-Head Blowout (1987)	4:52

Disc two
No.	Title	From the album (date)	Length
1.	"Ratmouth"	Soul-Crusher (1987)	3:41
2.	"Shack of Hate"	Soul-Crusher (1987)	2:55
3.	"Drowning the Colossus"	Soul-Crusher (1987)	4:54
4.	"Crow III"	Soul-Crusher (1987)	3:50
5.	"Die Zombie Die"	Soul-Crusher (1987)	4:07
6.	"Skin"	Soul-Crusher (1987)	3:37
7.	"Truck on Fire"	Soul-Crusher (1987)	4:06
8.	"Future Shock"	Soul-Crusher (1987)	3:10
9.	"Scum Kill"	Soul-Crusher (1987)	3:42
10.	"Diamond Ass"	Soul-Crusher (1987)	3:40

Disc three
No.	Title	From the album (date)	Length
1.	"Demonspeed"	Make Them Die Slowly (1989)	5:20
2.	"Disaster Blaster"	Make Them Die Slowly (1989)	6:05
3.	"Murderworld"	Make Them Die Slowly (1989)	6:13
4.	"Revenge"	Make Them Die Slowly (1989)	4:25
5.	"Acid Flesh"	Make Them Die Slowly (1989)	5:32
6.	"Power Hungry"	Make Them Die Slowly (1989)	5:15
7.	"Godslayer"	Make Them Die Slowly (1989)	7:15
8.	"God of Thunder" (Kiss cover)	God of Thunder (1989)	3:52
9.	"Love Razor"	God of Thunder (1989)	5:19
10.	"Disaster Blaster II"	God of Thunder (1989)	4:56

== Personnel ==
Adapted from the album's liner notes.

White Zombie

- Tom Guay – guitar (1.13–1.19, 2.1–2.10)
- Paul Kostabi – guitar (1.1–1.6)
- Peter Landau – drums (1.1–1.6)
- Tim Jeffs – guitar (1.7–1.12)
- Ivan de Prume – drums (1.7–1.19, 2.1–2.10, 3.1–3.10)
- John Ricci – guitar (3.1–3.7)
- Sean Yseult – bass
- Jay Yuenger – guitar (3.8–3.10), remastering
- Rob Zombie – vocals

Production and additional personnel

- J.Z. Barrell – engineering (1.7–1.12)
- Martin Bisi – engineering and mixing (3.1–3.7)
- Gary Dorfman – engineering (1.1–1.6)
- Oz Fritz – assistant engineering (3.1–3.7)
- Greg Gordon – engineering (3.8–3.10)
- Kramer – engineering (1.13–1.19)
- Bill Laswell – production (3.1–3.7)
- Robert Musso – additional engineering (3.1–3.7)
- Daniel Rey – production (3.8–3.10)
- Warren Shaw – assistant engineering (3.8–3.10)
- Nicky Skopelitis – programming (3.1–3.7)
- Artie Smith – technician (3.1–3.7)
- Wharton Tiers – production and engineering (2.1–2.10)
- White Zombie – production (1.1–1.19, 2.1–2.10)

== Release history ==
Region	Date	Label	Format	Catalog
United States	2016	Numero Group	CD, LP	NUM204
