= Soul-Crusher =

Studio album by White Zombie
- Released: November 1987
- Recorded: August 22, 1987
- Studio: Fun City (New York City)
- Genre: Noise rock
- Length: 37:42
- Labels: Silent Explosion, Caroline
- Producers: Wharton Tiers, White Zombie

White Zombie chronology
Psycho-Head Blowout (1987)	Soul-Crusher (1987)	Make Them Die Slowly (1989)

Audio
- "Album" playlist on YouTube

Soul-Crusher is the debut studio album by American rock band White Zombie, released independently in November 1987 by Silent Explosion. It was the band's second and final release with Tom "Five" Guay on guitar. Building off the sound established on Psycho-Head Blowout, the band matured its sound while placing further emphasis on the individual roles of its players. The album caught the attention of major labels and in 1988 was adopted and re-issued by Caroline Records.

Despite its initially limited release and the band's relatively unknown status, the album gained the admiration of musicians such as Kurt Cobain, Iggy Pop, and Thurston Moore. Professional music critics occasionally list it as being a landmark noise rock album and a highlight of the band's career.

The band would later reuse the album's title for the fifth song on their third studio album, La Sexorcisto: Devil Music Volume One.

== Recording ==
The band entered the studio to record Soul-Crusher only three months after the release of their EP, Psycho-Head Blowout. They decided to recruit Wharton Tiers, who had previously been associated with noise rock bands such as Pussy Galore and Sonic Youth, to produce and engineer the record. This marked the first time White Zombie had worked with a producer on any of their releases. The members of White Zombie claimed to have been more pleased with the production of Soul-Crusher than any previous recording and praised Tiers for giving them creative freedom during the recording process. However, Sean stated that, "We really do need more direction sometimes. We know what we want, but we're pretty inexperienced in the studio." Rob also expressed his dislike for the way the band sounded, noting that the equipment used in the recording sessions was of poor quality.

== Music and lyrics ==
Soul-Crusher continued to develop the punk-like noise rock style of its predecessor. The record's sound has been described as "Beefheart in painfully tight trousers trying to scream his way over Sonic Youth and The Birthday Party playing different songs in the same room." Sean has cited The Cramps, The Birthday Party, Flipper, Butthole Surfers, Black Flag, Einstürzende Neubauten, and Black Sabbath as primary influences to the band during this time. She said, "I would write bass riffs that were very driving and tribal with Ivan’s drums, very Birthday Party and Butthole Surfers-influenced. Then sometimes we would just tell Tom to go nuts and make some noise!". Guay also created entire tracks of guitar feedback and noise, which didn't relate to any of the songs, that the band would proceed to layer over the album. Rob would usually work out the lyrics and vocal arrangement after the music had already been written, sometimes even waiting until the band was in the studio to finish the song. He felt that the band had finally solidified into a unit and that the record perfectly showcased their sound during that era more than anything they had recorded before, although he was very critical of the band's music and the noise rock genre at the time, going as far as to say:

We just got called a noise band because we had such shitty equipment. It was like playing through cheap stereo speakers. It's so funny because in New York, no one will ever admit they're a noise band—even those who know they are. But when you get outta the city, everyone's dying to be called a noise band. They all think it's this really swingin' scene.

Rob recorded a variety of television and movie dialogue and sound effects to use on the album. This would become a characteristic that White Zombie would be known for on their later albums, especially on their Geffen releases.

== Release and packaging ==
Soul-Crusher was first issued on vinyl by the band's independent label Silent Explosion before the band was subsequently signed to Caroline Records and the album was repressed. Each label produced two-thousand copies on vinyl, making the record a much sought-after rarity among collectors. The album remained out-of-print for nearly two decades until making its CD debut on the 2008 anthology Let Sleeping Corpses Lie. In 2016, it was re-issued on CD and vinyl in the anthology It Came from N.Y.C., with remastered audio courtesy of guitarist Jay Yuenger.

The concept for the front and back cover was conceived by Rob in sketch form and executed by Michael Lavine, who had previously worked with White Zombie on Psycho-Head Blowout. It is a single photograph of the band, which continues from the front to the back of the record, that was montaged in a darkroom. Sean mistakenly used the wrong color for the logo and titles, turning what was originally intended to be blood-red into hot pink lettering.

== Critical reception ==
Professional ratings
Review scores
Source	Rating
AllMusic	4/5 stars
The Encyclopedia of Popular Music	3/5 stars
Pitchfork	8.4/10
The Village Voice	D+

The album's reception was somewhat positive, with significant amount of praise was directed at Rob's esoteric lyrical contributions. In her book I'm in the Band, Sean recalled that "critics seemed to enjoy Rob's psychotic lyrics, so much so that their entire review would try to emulate his style, which was entertaining". Billy Lucas and David Stubbs of Melody Maker praised the artwork, lyrics, "slammer guitars", and "scrawling vocals" on the album. Sounds gave the album three out of five stars; the reviewer citing that the album contained "no melody, little arrangement, just a cacophony of unlovely, forbidding noise that bloodies the nose of rock 'n' roll".

Iggy Pop was an admirer of the album and listed it as one of his favorite records of 1988 in the "Readers and Critics Poll" for Rolling Stone. Pop later recorded a guest vocal for the band's 1992 single "Black Sunshine". In a retrospective review, Bradley Torreano of AllMusic praised the lyrics and deemed it "a prime slab of noise rock that has aged shockingly well" and that "Zombie fans might not even like this that much, but no less of an authority than Kurt Cobain himself pointed to this period in their career as one of his biggest influences".

The album, however, has not gone without criticism. Sean noted that "people either loved or hated it – or were full of self-loathing and loved to be tortured by it". Creem described Soul-Crusher as the "most obnoxious sound of the year" and that "no one in the black concert T is ever gonna like White Zombie".

== Tour ==
The band began touring outside the northeast for the first time after the re-release of Soul-Crusher on Caroline Records in 1988. They would open for bands like the Circle Jerks, but received mostly lukewarm responses from the crowds. However, their shows were received positively by critics, who described the band's onstage presence as an "aural and visual onslaught of vicious, shambling noise". It would be a brief tour as the band would enter the studio later that year to record Make Them Die Slowly.

== Track listing ==
All lyrics are written by Rob Straker; all music is composed by White Zombie (Straker, Sean Yseult, Tom Five and Ivan de Prume), except where noted.

Side one
No.	Title	Music	Length
1.	"Ratmouth"	Yseult	3:41
2.	"Shack of Hate"		2:55
3.	"Drowning the Colossus"		4:54
4.	"Crow III"		3:50
5.	"Die Zombie Die"		4:07

Side two
No.	Title	Music	Length
1.	"Skin"		3:37
2.	"Truck on Fire"		4:06
3.	"Future Shock"	Yseult	3:10
4.	"Scum Kill"		3:42
5.	"Diamond Ass"		3:40
Total length:			37:42

== Personnel ==
Adapted from the Soul-Crusher liner notes.

White Zombie

- Rob Straker – vocals, illustrations, design
- Tom Five – guitar
- Sean Yseult – bass, design
- Ivan de Prume – drums

Production and additional personnel

- Michael Lavine – cover art, photography
- Wharton Tiers – production, engineering
- White Zombie – production

== Release history ==
Region	Date	Label	Format	Catalog
United States	1987	Silent Explosion	LP	SE-002
United States	1988	Caroline	LP	CAROL 1350
United States	1988	Caroline	CS	MC 1350
