= Silent Stream of Godless Elegy =

Czech folk metal band

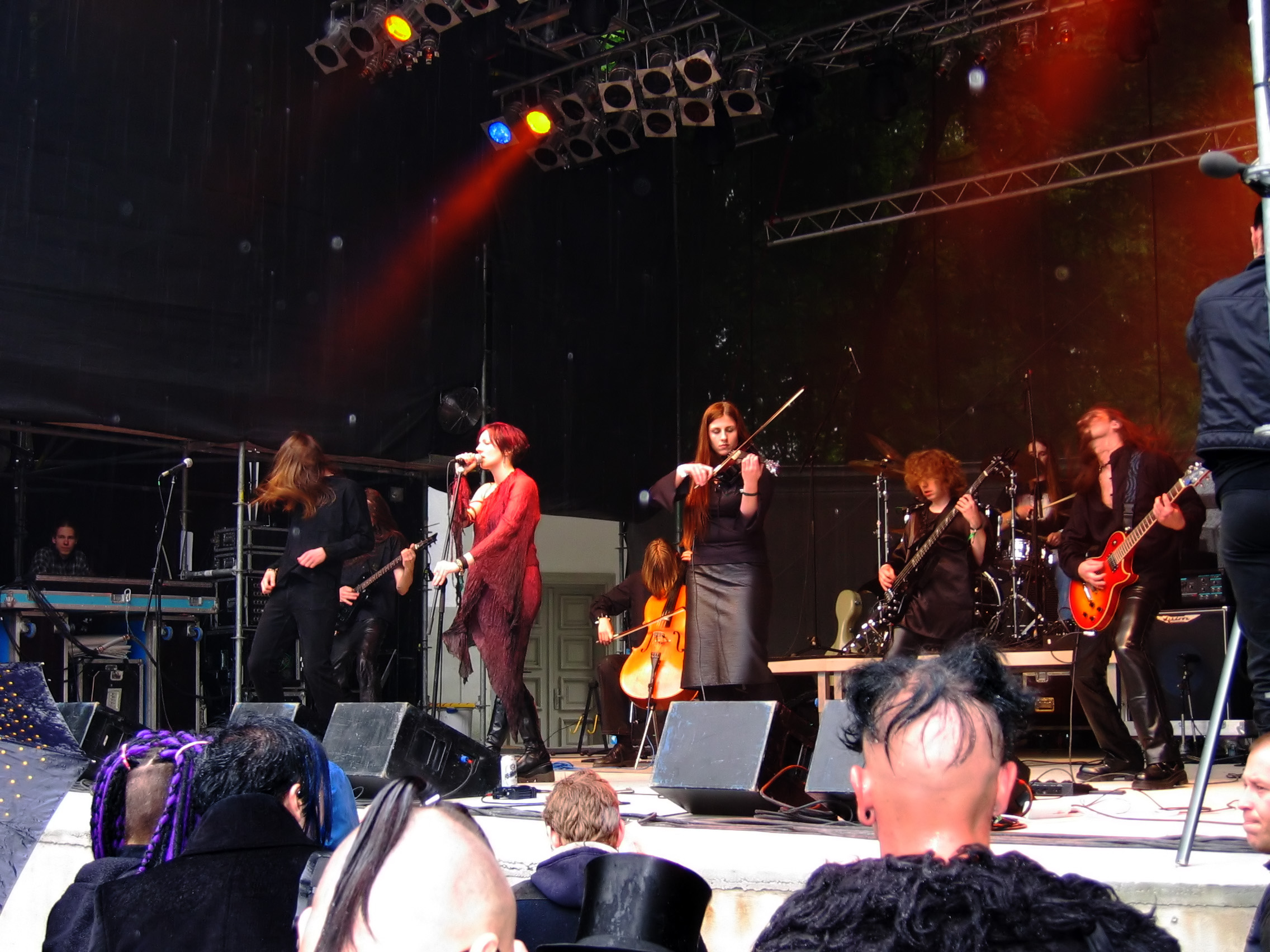
- SSoGE, 2005

Background information
- Origin: Hranice, Czech Republic
- Genres: Folk metal; doom metal; death-doom(early)
- Years active: 1995–present
- Labels: Redblack; Season of Mist
- Members: Stanislav Pavlík; Pavel Hrnčíř; Hana Hajdová; Gabriela Povrazníková; Michal Milták; Michal Sýkora; Petra Nováčková; Radek Hajda
- Past members: Filip Chudý; Hynek Stančík; Jarek Adámek; Kiril Chlebnikov; Michal Hajda; Michal Herák; Michal Rak; Pavla Lukášová; Petr Staněk; Zuzana Zamazalová; Mirek Petřek; Dušan Fojtášek; Petra Nováčková; David Najbrt
- Website: ssoge.com

Silent Stream of Godless Elegy is a Moravian folk metal band from the Czech Republic, formed in 1995. They have released seven studio albums and one EP.

== History ==
=== Early years: Iron, Behind the Shadows, and Themes ===
Silent Stream of Godless Elegy was formed in Hranice in 1995 by brothers Michal (drums) and Radek Hajda (guitar). They were joined by bassist Filip Chudý, vocalist and solo guitarist Petr Staněk, and violinist Zuzana Zamazalová. Within their first year of existence, they released the two demo albums Apotheosis (1995) and ...Amber Sea (1996). They garnered some attention with their debut album, Iron, released in 1996. The album featured strong melodies, Staňek's notable growling vocals, and Zamazalová's distinctive violin sound. In the summer of 1997, they were joined by cellist Michal Sýkora.

SSoGE's second album, Behind the Shadows, released in 1998 on Redblack, expanded the band's repertoire, with more pronounced rhythmic and stylistic techniques, which gained them a wider international audience. The first phase of SSoGE's history closed with the release of their third record, 2000's Themes, which showcased a more progressive sound, combining doom metal with death and black metal tones, as well as a few lighter elements. The album won the band an Anděl Award (then known as Ceny Akademie populární hudby) in 2000 from the Czech Academy of Popular Music in the "Hard & Heavy" category. The same year, SSoGE contributed three songs to tribute albums celebrating some of their musical heroes. These were "Zapálili Jsme Onen Svět", a song by Czech black metal band Master's Hammer; "Blood, Milk and Sky" by White Zombie; and "Kashmir" by Led Zeppelin.

=== New lineup, new material ===
Following this, the band went through several lineup changes, leaving Radek Hajda as the sole founding member, though Michal Sýkora eventually returned. They began to emphasize Moravian folklore, as showcased on their next album, Relic Dances (2004). The record included collaborations with Moravian folk musician Tomáš Kočko and the dulcimer ensemble Radošov. This won them a second Anděl Award (then known as Ceny Anděl Allianz) in the same category. Due to the popularity of this record, in 2006, SSoGE released the EP Osamělí, which contained additional material from the Relic Dances recording sessions, sung in Czech and Polish. Relic Dances was followed in 2011 by Návaz, which was produced by Roland Grapow. The band's next release was Smutnice (2018), produced by Israeli musician Yossi Sassi and mixed by Grapow. In 2024, they released the album Jiná.

== Band members ==
Current

- Pavel Hrnčíř – vocals
- Hana Hajdová – vocals
- Michal Sýkora – cello
- Gabriela Povrazníková – violin
- Radek Hajda – guitar
- Stanislav Pavlík – bass
- Michal Milták – drums

Past

- Filip Chudý – bass (1995–1999)
- Hynek Stančík – guitar (2001–2003)
- Jarek Adámek – guitar (2004–2005)
- Kiril Chlebnikov – violin/bass (1999–2001)
- Michal Hajda – drums (1995–2003)
- Michal Herák – vocal (2001–2004)
- Michal Rak – drums (2003–2007)
- Pavla Lukášová – violin (2000–2001)
- Petr Staněk – guitar/vocals (1995–2001)
- Zuzana Zamazalová – violin/vocals (1995–2001)
- Petra Nováčková – violin (2001–2008)
- Mirek Petřek – guitar (1997–?)
- Dušan Fojtášek – bass (2002–?)
- David Najbrt – drums (2007–?)

== Discography ==
Studio albums

- Iron (1996)
- Behind the Shadows (1998)
- Themes (2000)
- Relic Dances (2004)
- Návaz (2011)
- Smutnice (2018)
- Jiná (2024)

EPs

- Osamělí (2006)

Demos

- Apotheosis (1995)
- ...Amber Sea (1996)

Compilation appearances

- "Zapálili Jsme Onen Svět" A Tribute to Master's Hammer (2000)
- "Blood, Milk and Sky" Super-Charger Hell - A Tribute to White Zombie (2000)
- "Kashmir" Dead Zeppelin - A Metal Tribute to Led Zeppelin (2000)
