= Angel Rot =

American stoner metal band

- Origin: Manhattan, New York, U.S.
- Genres: Stoner metal; doom metal; sludge metal
- Years active: 1988–1994
- Labels: Man's Ruin
- Past members: George Berz; Mike Davis; Tom Five; Gyda Gash; Steven Kleiner; Tony Mann; Scott Sanfratello

Angel Rot were an American stoner metal band based in Manhattan, New York. The original incarnation of the band consisted of bassist Mike Davis, vocalist/guitarist Tom Five and drummer George Berz.

== History ==
Angel Rot was formed in 1988 Manhattan by bassist Mike Davis, vocalist/guitarist Tom Five and drummer George Berz. Tom Five had been a band member of seminal industrial/noise rock band White Zombie. Scott Sanfratello took over drumming duties from Berz in 1989 and was then replaced by Tony Mann a year later. In 1990 Steven Kleiner filled the drummer role and remained with Angel Rot until they disbanded. That year the band released the 7" vinyl single Screw Drive, followed by another release in 1992 with another single titled Necrostrangle.

In 1993 the band recorded sessions for their full-length debut but the release date was delayed when the master tapes were lost. In 1999 those sessions were finally issued on Unlistenable Hymns of Indulgent Damage released by Man's Ruin Records. Gyda Gash replaced Mike Davis on bass until the group disbanded in 1994.

== Discography ==
Studio albums

- Unlistenable Hymns of Indulgent Damage (1999, Man's Ruin)

EPs

- Screw Drive (1990, Fuck)
- Necrostrangle (1992, Fuck)
