= Themes (Silent Stream of Godless Elegy album) =

2000 studio album by Silent Stream of Godless Elegy

Studio album by Silent Stream of Godless Elegy
- Released: 11 May 2000
- Recorded: January–February 2000
- Genre: Pagan metal
- Length: 50:54
- Label: Redblack
- Producer: Miloš "Dodo" Doležal & Silent Stream of Godless Elegy

Silent Stream of Godless Elegy chronology
Behind the Shadows (1998)	Themes (2000)	Relic Dances (2005)

Themes is the third studio album by Moravian (Czech) folk metal band Silent Stream of Godless Elegy, released on 11 May 2000 by Redblack. The album won the band an Anděl Award (then known as Ceny Akademie populární hudby) in 2000 from the Czech Academy of Popular Music in the "Hard & Heavy" category. The songs on the album are primarily sung in English.

== Track listing ==
1. "Lovin' on the Earth" – 4:02
2. "We Shall Go" – 3:40
3. "My Friend Who Doesn't Exist" – 5:48
4. "Theme I" – 1:23
5. "In Bone Frames" – 7:15
6. "Theme II" – 0:32
7. "Flowers Fade Away" – 3:18
8. "Eternal Cry of Glory" – 3:31
9. "Theme III" – 0:45
10. "II TSOHG" – 5:44
11. "Winter Queen" – 4:49
12. "Hrob" – 6:59
