= Unlistenable Hymns of Indulgent Damage =

Studio album by Angel Rot
- Released: April 23, 1999
- Recorded: 1993
- Studio: Noise New York (New York City)
- Genre: Stoner metal; doom metal
- Length: 45:14
- Label: Man's Ruin
- Producer: Sal Canzonieri; Mike Davis; Tom Five; Ira Heaps

Unlistenable Hymns of Indulgent Damage is the debut album by American metal band Angel Rot, released on April 23, 1999, by Man's Ruin Records. The album was recorded in 1993 but delay in releasing the sessions occurred when the master tapes were lost.

== Reception ==
Professional ratings
Review scores
Source	Rating
AllMusic	3/5 stars

Eduardo Rivadavia of AllMusic awarded Unlistenable Hymns of Indulgent Damage three out of five stars, praising the guitar work but criticizing the songwriting as lackluster. He called it "one of the most unique-sounding and grammatically challenged stoner rock albums issued in 1999, even by the underground genre's already unconventional standards." Impact Press also criticized the vocal performances but generally agreed on the music being enjoyable.

== Track listing ==
All lyrics are written by Tom Five; all music is composed by Mike Davis, Tom Five and Steven Kleiner

No.	Title	Length
1.	"Erotic Catacomb"	3:18
2.	"Narcissectional Punishment"	2:54
3.	"Dirt Trip"	7:31
4.	"Necrostrangle"	3:53
5.	"Callous Caul of Gloom"	4:08
6.	"Wallow"	5:37
7.	"Feotal Machine"	6:01
8.	"Life-Death Strobe"	4:40
9.	"Clean Disease"	3:13
10.	"Screwdrive"	3:59

== Personnel ==
Adapted from the album's liner notes.

Angel Rot

- Mike Davis – bass guitar, production
- Tom Five – lead vocals, guitar, production, illustrations, design
- Steven Kleiner – drums, illustrations

Production and design

- Ross Bonadonna – mixing
- Sal Canzonieri – production
- Alan Douches – mastering
- Ira Heaps – production

== Release history ==
Region	Date	Label	Format	Catalog
United States	1999	Man's Ruin	CD	CLK 133
