= Psycho-Head Blowout =

EP by White Zombie
- Released: May 1987
- Recorded: February 1987
- Studio: Noise New York (New York City)
- Genres: Noise rock; garage rock; post-punk
- Length: 29:34
- Label: Silent Explosion
- Producers: Kramer, White Zombie

White Zombie chronology
Pig Heaven/Slaughter the Grey (1986)	Psycho-Head Blowout (1987)	Soul-Crusher (1987)

Psycho-Head Blowout is the third EP by American rock band White Zombie, released in May 1987 by Silent Explosion. The album was recorded with producer and composer Kramer and was the band's first to feature guitarist Tom Guay, who had a pivotal influence on the band's sound. It was also the debut release of the band's short-lived label Silent Explosion. The record was the band's first release to receive critical notice and garnered them notice in underground circles.

== Recording ==
The music that comprises Psycho-Head Blowout was recorded by producer and composer Kramer at his studio Noise New York. In an interview with Creem, Rob was very critical of Kramer's work on the album, saying that he "wouldn't do anything we told him to."

== Tour ==
Although Psycho-Head Blowout was White Zombie's first release to receive praise from more prestigious critics, most of the attention was directed towards the live shows surrounding the release of the record. Simmons of The Village Voice wrote, "Their recent EP Psycho-Head Blowout reams the cranium quite nicely, but the live shows will really open your skull" while Smith from the same newspaper simply wrote, "Seethisband. Seethisband. Seethisband. Go." During this time the band toured mostly with other local New York bands such as the Swans, Rat at Rat R, Pussy Galore and The Honeymoon Killers. "We didn't really fit in", recalls Sean "it felt like the East Village scene was amused by us, at best".

== Release and reception ==
Professional ratings
Review scores
Source	Rating
AllMusic	3/5 stars
Pitchfork	(7.5/10)

Psycho-Head Blowout was pressed to vinyl and released on White Zombie's own label Silent Explosion, limited to a pressing of one thousand copies. The album made its debut on CD when it was included in the 2008 anthology Let Sleeping Corpses Lie. In 2016, it was re-issued on vinyl in the anthology It Came from N.Y.C., with remastered audio courtesy of guitarist Jay Yuenger.

In an interview, Nirvana vocalist Kurt Cobain pointed to Psycho-Head Blowout as being one of his favorite EPs, praising Tom Guay's guitar playing style as being "fucked-up, bending strings, borderline in-tune--that type of chaos". Retrospective reviews have been mostly complimentary. Allmusic writer Bradley Torreano gave the album three out of five stars, saying, "young Rob Zombie sounded like Damaged-era Rollins, while the band crafted some of the gnarliest grunge on the East Coast" and that "any fans of the New York noise scene would do themselves a favor by hearing this album". The Trouser Press wrote "the foursome was just beginning to pay attention to its audio obligations: guitarist Tom Five started to pluck some sputtering MC5-esque leads from the unctuous sea of sonic muck, and drummer Ivan DePrume channeled some of his plentiful brute force into structured beats. By most standards, however, Psycho-Head Blowout is still a mess."

== Packaging ==
The picture of the band on the front cover was taken by Michael Lavine, who had previously worked as a fashion photographer. He had been friends with Sean Yseult and was asked to take the band's picture for the cover despite having never done that kind of work before. The photo made an impact however, as no one else in the New York City music scene was releasing albums with their picture on the cover at the time.

The quotes "How's everything in the pimp business?" inscribed into the runout of Side A and "I don't know nobody named Iris" on Side B of the vinyl are from the 1976 film Taxi Driver.

== Track listing ==
All lyrics are written by Rob Straker; all music is composed by White Zombie (Sean Yseult, Tom Five, Ivan de Plume, Straker).

Side one
No.	Title	Length
1.	"Eighty Eight"	3:45
2.	"Fast Jungle"	4:24
3.	"Gun Crazy"	4:29

Side two
No.	Title	Length
1.	"Kick"	4:08
2.	"Memphis"	3:37
3.	"Magdalene"	4:12
4.	"True Crime"	4:50
Total length:		29:34

== Personnel ==
Adapted from the Psycho-Head Blowout liner notes.

White Zombie

- Ivan de Prume – drums
- Tom Five – electric guitar
- Sean Yseult – bass guitar
- Rob Straker – vocals, illustrations, design

Production and additional personnel

- Kramer – engineering
- Michael Lavine – cover art, photography
- White Zombie – production

== Release history ==
Region	Date	Label	Format	Catalog
United States	1987	Silent Explosion	LP	L10977
