= Relic Dances =

2005 studio album by Silent Stream of Godless Elegy

Studio album by Silent Stream of Godless Elegy
- Released: 6 December 2005 (CD); 16 August 2006 (LP)
- Recorded: 2004
- Genre: Folk metal
- Length: 45:12 (CD); 46:29 (LP)
- Labels: Redblack; Monster Nation
- Producer: Tomáš Kočko

Silent Stream of Godless Elegy chronology
Themes (2000)	Relic Dances (2005)	Osamělí (2006)

Relic Dances is the fourth studio album by Czech folk metal band Silent Stream of Godless Elegy, released in 2005 by Redblack. The album, like its predecessor Themes, won the band an Anděl Award (then known as Ceny Anděl Allianz) in 2004 from the Czech Academy of Popular Music in the "Hard & Heavy" category. The songs on the album are sung in English.

== Background ==
The album was produced by Tomáš Kočko, a well-known Moravian musician dedicated to world music. It offers a contrast from previous SSoGE albums by the inclusion of extensive elements of Moravian folk music. The band's then-label Redblack wrote: "Tomáš Kočko, in the role of producer, has invited one of the leading Moravian dulcimer ensembles, Radošov, to realize this musical delicacy. The result is an album full of metal energy and pressure, strong Moravian melodies, and surprising connections between the melancholy of doom metal and the sadness of Moravian folk ballads".

The album consists of eight tracks. Some of them had been recorded in Czech as well as in English, and these were originally intended to be included on the record, but for financial reasons, this idea was abandoned. The shelved tracks, together with a few versions in Polish, were later recorded for the EP Osamělí and also included on the vinyl version of Relic Dances, both of which were released in 2006.

== Vinyl version ==
In 2006, Relic Dances was released on vinyl by Monster Nation, the first album by Silent Stream of Godless Elegy to be issued in this format. It differs from the CD version by the order of the songs and the fact that four tracks are sung in Czech and Polish.

== Track listing ==
CD

1. "Look" – 4:32
2. "To Face the End" – 6:52
3. "I Would Dance" – 4:52
4. "Together" – 8:12
5. "You Loved the Only Blood" – 3:24
6. "Lonely" – 7:39
7. "Gigula" – 3:03
8. "Trinity" – 6:33

LP

Side A

1. "Look" – 5:48
2. "Tváří v tvář" – 6:53
3. "Tańczyłabym" – 4:52
4. "Trinity" – 6:34

Side B

1. "You Loved the Only Blood“ – 3:24
2. "Razem" – 8:16
3. "Gigula" – 3:04
4. "Osamělí" – 7:38

== Personnel ==
Silent Stream of Godless Elegy

- Pavel Hrnčíř – vocals
- Hanka Hajdová – vocals
- Michal Sýkora – cello
- Petra Nováčková – violin
- Radek Hajda – guitar
- Dušan Fojtásek – bass
- Michal Rak – drums

Guest musicians

- Tomáš Kočko – vocals, acoustic guitar, trombita, darbouka
- Radošov ensemble:
  - Radim Havlíček – first violin
  - Jiři Matela – second violin
  - Petr Vyoral – clarinet, flute
  - Petr Světlík – cimbal
  - Čeněk Říha – viola
  - Roman Plaširyba – double bass
