= Michael S. Reynolds =

Hemingway scholar

In the 1970s

Michael Shane Reynolds (1937–2000) was Professor of English at North Carolina State University from 1965 to 1997. His main focus was the author Ernest Hemingway and his magnum opus was an extensive, five-volume biography:

1. The Young Hemingway (Blackwell, 1986),
2. Hemingway: The Paris Years (Blackwell, 1989)
3. Hemingway: The American Homecoming (Blackwell, 1992)
4. Hemingway: The 1930s (Norton, 1997)
5. Hemingway: The Final Years (Norton, 1999)

Reynolds studied Hemingway in a meticulous way, cataloguing the details of his life. His doctoral thesis at Duke University became his first book, Hemingway’s First War. This showed that Hemingway likewise did not just write from personal experience, as commonly supposed, but also did detailed research for his writing. The first volume of his biography, The Young Hemingway, was a finalist for the National Book Awards in 1986.

Reynolds was the son of a geologist, Raymond D Reynolds, Houston Texas. He married Ann Eubanks in 1960 and they had two daughters, including bassist Sean Yseult. His death at age 63 in Santa Fe, New Mexico was caused by pancreatic cancer.
