= Gods on Voodoo Moon =

EP by White Zombie
- Released: November 1985
- Recorded: October 18, 1985
- Studio: Batcave Studios (New York)
- Genres: Noise rock; garage rock; horror punk; post-punk
- Length: 9:30 (vinyl); 14:30 (cassette)
- Producer: White Zombie

White Zombie chronology
Gods on Voodoo Moon (1985)	Pig Heaven/Slaughter the Grey (1986)

Gods on Voodoo Moon is the first recording and release by American rock band White Zombie, released independently as an EP in November 1985. It was their only release with Paul "Ena" Kostabi on guitar and Peter Landau on drums.

== Production ==
The six songs, including "Black Friday" and "Dead or Alive", were all recorded in one session and in one take each.

== Release and reception ==
Professional ratings
Review scores
Source	Rating
Pitchfork	(6.5/10)

The EP was initially only released to vinyl. The songs "Black Friday" and "Dead Or Alive" were recorded during the same sessions but were excluded from the vinyl pressings due to lack of space. A cassette version was released in 1989 on Caroline Records featuring the two unreleased tracks. Due to a lack of funds at the time, only 300 copies of vinyl were pressed at Macola Records, Hollywood, California, 100 of which were sold, while the others remained in the possession of the band.

The EP was re-released by the Numero Group on June 3, 2016, as part of the It Came from N.Y.C. retrospective box set. Remastered by Jay Yuenger, the set was available on 5 vinyl discs with a free digital download in 320 KBps MP3 format, or as a 3-CD set. This release includes the two tracks previously only available on cassette.

It was re-released on Record Store Day, in April 2017, on red ("Zombie Blood") vinyl and white ("Zombie Pus") vinyl, on 750 copies total.

== Track listing ==
All tracks are written by Eni Kostabi, except where noted.

No.	Title	Length
1.	"Gentleman Junkie"	2:13
2.	"King of Souls [W.Z.]"	2:19
3.	"Tales From the Scarecrow Man"	3:17
4.	"Cat's Eye Resurrection"	1:40
Total length:		9:30

Cassette edition bonus tracks
No.	Title	Writer(s)	Length
5.	"Black Friday"		3:09
6.	"Dead or Alive"	Kostabi, Rob Straker	1:49
Total length:			14:30

== Personnel ==
Adapted from the Gods on Voodoo Moon liner notes.

White Zombie

- Ena Kostabi – guitar
- Peter Landau – drums
- Sean Yseult – bass, photography
- Rob Straker – vocals, illustrations

Production and additional personnel

- Gary Dorfman – engineering
- White Zombie – production

== Release history ==
Region	Date	Label	Format
United States	1985	self-released	CS, 7"
