= Pig Heaven/Slaughter the Grey =

EP by White Zombie
- Released: May 1986
- Recorded: 1986
- Studio: 6/8 Studios (New York City)
- Genre: Noise rock
- Length: 8:35
- Producer: White Zombie

White Zombie chronology
Gods on Voodoo Moon (1985)	Pig Heaven/Slaughter the Grey (1986)	Psycho-Head Blowout (1987)

Alternative cover
- Second pressing cover

Professional ratings
Review scores
Source	Rating
Pitchfork	(6.8/10)

Pig Heaven/Slaughter the Grey is the second EP by American rock band White Zombie, independently released in May 1986. Two different pressings of this album were created (the differences between the two being the different guitarists and the altered cover art), both of which were limited to 500 copies each. By this time, drummer Peter Landau was replaced by Ivan de Prume, who would remain with the band until Astro-Creep: 2000, and guitarist Paul "Ena" Kostabi by Tim Jeffs.

== Recording ==
Although only "Pig Heaven" and "Slaughter the Grey" were released, the band also recorded "Scarecrow #2" (a remake of "Tales From The Scarecrow Man" from Gods on Voodoo Moon), "Rain Insane", "Paradise Fireball", and "Red River Flow" in the same session. These songs were officially released on It Came from N.Y.C. A bulk of the material was recorded in roughly two hours.

== Track listing ==
All lyrics are written by Rob Straker; all music is composed by White Zombie (Sean Yseult, Straker, Tim Jeffs, Ivan de Prume).

Side one
No.	Title	Length
1.	"Pig Heaven"	4:28

Side two
No.	Title	Length
1.	"Slaughter the Grey"	4:07
Total length:		8:35

== Personnel ==
Adapted from the EP's liner notes.

White Zombie

- Ivan de Prume – drums
- Tim Jeffs – guitar
- Rob Straker – vocals, cover art, illustrations
- Sean Yseult – bass, photography

Additional musicians and production

- J.Z. Barrell – engineering
- Alex Smith – photography
- White Zombie – production

== Release history ==
Region	Date	Label	Format
United States	1986	Self-released	LP
