= Make Them Die Slowly (album) =

Studio album by White Zombie
- Released: March 22, 1989
- Recorded: November 1988
- Studios: Platinum Island, New York City, New York
- Genres: Heavy metal; groove metal; thrash metal
- Length: 39:56
- Label: Caroline
- Producer: Bill Laswell

White Zombie chronology
Soul-Crusher (1987)	Make Them Die Slowly (1989)	God of Thunder (1989)

Audio
- "Album" playlist on YouTube

Make Them Die Slowly is the second studio album by American rock band White Zombie, released on March 22, 1989, by Caroline Records. It is named after the 1981 horror film Cannibal Ferox, which was originally released in the US as Make Them Die Slowly. There is a printing error on the CD's side saying "Let Them Die Slowly" instead of the album's correct title. Produced by composer Bill Laswell and featuring John Ricci on guitar, the album represented a transition from the noise rock influenced sound of White Zombie's previous releases to heavy metal, which informed much of their later work.

== Recording ==
White Zombie entered the studio in early 1988 to record the follow-up to Soul-Crusher, intending to release their next album by June. Since their previous release the band had started embracing a more heavy metal influenced sound, which they wanted to capture in recording their new album. They recorded sixteen songs over the course of four days but decided against releasing any of the finished material due to its similarity with their previous output. Guitarist Tom Guay left the band during this time and was replaced with John Ricci. The new line-up switched to a larger recording venue and attempted to re-record the material but ran out of the funds necessary to complete the album.

Iggy Pop, who was an admirer of their last album, recommended that the band finish recording with producer and composer Bill Laswell. Laswell opted to record the album from scratch at Platinum Island studio in New York City. The final guitar overdubs, vocals and mixing were done with Martin Bisi, at his studio in Gowanus, Brooklyn, New York. The band was critical of Laswell's production, with Sean saying, "it sounds like a tin can to me, with a muffled non-existent bass." In a 2010 interview, she recalled her experience recording the album:

We made it once, it sounded good, Rob hated it. We made it again, the songs getting more and more uptight and overwritten, and got interrupted halfway through – Bill Laswell now wanted to make the record and start from scratch. We made it a third time, and it was the worst version of all three! I hate the way this record sounds, not to mention my memories of Laswell sitting me down and making me play in a chair, having me hit the strings ever so lightly so I wouldn't 'clip' the note – what a pile of bullshit!

Some of the songs cut from the release are "Dead Ringer", "Freak War", "Punishment Park", "Scum Kill II", and "Star Slammer". Guitarist John Ricci exited the band the day the record was completed having been diagnosed with carpal tunnel syndrome.

== Music ==
The album displays change from the punk-influenced noise rock of their earlier albums to a sound more reminiscent of thrash metal. Rob has claimed "[W]e fell into the noise scene by accident" and that "[A]fter a while we got fed up and didn't want to have anything to do with it. We tried to move away from it consciously". Although he had previously disliked the heavy metal scene, Rob's opinion changed after borrowing Metallica's Ride the Lightning from drummer Ivan de Prume. Sean has cited both Metallica and Slayer as being highly influential to the band during this time. In an interview with Creem Presents: Thrash Metal, Sean suggested that "the new stuff is pretty close to being metal", while Rob claimed, "I don't know if you'd really call it 'metal' but there's a lot more focus to it. The songs are more like... songs."

== Critical reception ==
Professional ratings
Review scores
Source	Rating
AllMusic	2.5/5 stars
Chicago Tribune	3/4 stars
The Encyclopedia of Popular Music	3/5 stars
Kerrang!	3/5 stars
Metal Hammer	2/5 stars
MusicHound Rock	3/5 stars
Pitchfork	6.0/10

Make Them Die Slowly received generally mixed reviews from critics. AllMusic staff writer Eduardo Rivadavia said that "although Make Them Die Slowly actually contained most of the key musical ingredients responsible for Sexorcisto's subsequent breakthrough", the album "leaves much to be desired by subsequent standards". Trouser Press wrote "there are traces of the old art-damage – most perceptibly on the plodding 'Godslayer', which is well-steeped in Funhouse-era Stoogery – but producer Bill Laswell keeps the band on track". David Sprague of Spin gave it an enthusiastic review, saying "Make Them Die Slowly might not be the metal LP to end all metal LPs, but it's damned likely to give you more nightmares and chuckles than anything else money can buy you these days". Greg Kot of the Chicago Tribune gave the album three out of four stars, praising White Zombie's "terrific sense of humor".

Don Kaye of Kerrang! wrote that the album featured "meticulously crafted songs that each lead to bloodshedding climaxes of unbottled fury", but concluded that "the overall canned sound of the record is a harmful, if not fatal, wound". In his review of White Zombie's 2016 box set It Came from N.Y.C., Pitchfork's Evan Minsker said that Laswell's production "placed a huge emphasis on Ricci's guitar and Zombie's voice while neutering the rhythm section [...] The overall effect is especially draining when taken in the box set's chronological order: the noise dominance of Soul-Crusher followed by the sluggish, monotonous Make Them Die Slowly." Sprague gave the production uncommon praise, writing that Laswell "brings with him the simultaneously thin and heavy sound he's so fond of (cf. Motörhead's Orgasmatron), and works wonders with it".

== Track listing ==
All lyrics are written by Rob Zombie; all music is composed by White Zombie (Zombie, Sean Yseult, John Ricci, and Ivan de Prume), except where noted.

No.	Title	Music	Length
1.	"Demonspeed"		5:21
2.	"Disaster Blaster"	Yseult	6:03
3.	"Murderworld"	Yseult	6:10
4.	"Revenge"		4:22
5.	"Acid Flesh"	Yseult	5:30
6.	"Power Hungry"		5:12
7.	"Godslayer"		7:12
Total length:			39:56

== Personnel ==
Adapted from the Make Them Die Slowly liner notes.

White Zombie

- Rob Zombie – vocals, illustrations
- John Ricci – guitar
- Sean Yseult – bass
- Ivan de Prume – drums

Production and additional personnel

- Martin Bisi – engineering, mixing
- Oz Fritz – assistant engineering
- Bill Laswell – production
- Robert Musso – additional engineering
- Nicky Skopelitis – programming
- Artie Smith – technician
- Howie Weinberg – mastering

== Release history ==
Region	Date	Label	Format	Catalog
United States	1989	Caroline	CD, CS, LP	CAROL 1362
