= Airheads =

1994 film by Michael Lehmann

- Theatrical release poster
- Directed by: Michael Lehmann
- Written by: Rich Wilkes
- Produced by: Mark Burg; Robert Simonds
- Starring: Brendan Fraser; Steve Buscemi; Adam Sandler; Chris Farley; Michael McKean; Judd Nelson; Michael Richards; Joe Mantegna
- Cinematography: John Schwartzman
- Edited by: Stephen Semel
- Music by: Carter Burwell
- Production companies: Island World; Robert Simonds Productions
- Distributed by: 20th Century Fox
- Release date: August 5, 1994
- Running time: 92 minutes
- Country: United States
- Language: English
- Budget: $15 million
- Box office: $5 million

Airheads is a 1994 American comedy film directed by Michael Lehmann and written by Rich Wilkes. It stars Brendan Fraser, Steve Buscemi and Adam Sandler as the members of a struggling rock band who hijack a Los Angeles radio station in order to get their demo aired. The rest of the principal cast includes Chris Farley, Michael McKean, Judd Nelson, Michael Richards and Joe Mantegna, with Ernie Hudson, Amy Locane, Nina Siemaszko, Marshall Bell, Reg E. Cathey and David Arquette in supporting roles.

Airheads was released by 20th Century Fox on August 5, 1994 and was a critical and commercial failure, but has since come to be viewed as a cult film.

== Plot ==
In Los Angeles, Chester "Chazz Darby" Ogilvie and his friends, sibling musicians Rex and Pip, are in the hard rock band "The Lone Rangers", who are continuously rejected while trying to get their demo tape heard by record producers like Jimmie Wing. After scolding him for being lazy, Chazz's girlfriend Kayla kicks him out of her apartment.

The Lone Rangers try to get local rock station KPPX to play their reel-to-reel tape on the air by attempting to break-in through the back door. Once inside, DJ Ian "The Shark" talks with them on the air. Station manager Milo Jackson overhears them and intervenes, but Ian continues broadcasting. After Milo calls Rex "Hollywood Boulevard trash," he and Chazz pull out realistic-looking water pistols filled with hot pepper sauce and demand airplay. After setting up an old reel-to-reel for the demo, the tape begins to play but is immediately destroyed when the player malfunctions. The trio attempt escape, but the station's accountant Doug Beech has already called the police. The building ends up being surrounded as the Lone Rangers start rounding up Suzzi and the other employees Yvonne, Marcus and Carter.

The band negotiates with the police, who are now tasked to find Kayla who has a cassette of the demo. Since the station never went off the air, news of the hostage crisis travel and fans begin showing up outside and interfering with police. A SWAT team also arrives where Carl Mace prefers using force over negotiation tactics by Sergeant O'Malley. His team secretly passes a gun through a roof vent to Beech who has been hiding in the air ducts. During the crisis, it is revealed that Milo secretly signed a deal to change KPPX's format from rock to adult contemporary which includes having to fire Ian and most of the other employees. Consequently, Ian and some employees side with the band and turn against Milo.

The police find Kayla at a club and she arrives at the station to deliver the tape. However, the tape is damaged because she threw it out of the car earlier. Chazz and Kayla get into an argument that escalates and results in the studio console being destroyed, dashing any hopes of the tape being played on the air.

As some of the items the band demanded from police are brought into the station, the door shuts on Rex's plastic gun, revealing it to be fake. Seeing this, Marcus and Carter run out with one telling the SWAT team the band's guns are fake upon being subdued. As the team assembles to storm the station, Beech corners the band from an air vent. Knowing he no longer will have a job at the station, Ian knocks down Beech's gun. This causes the weapon to wildly fire rounds, and the police are forced to back off. Ian picks up the gun, but gives it to Chazz in an act of anti-establishment rebellion.

Jimmie Wing comes to the station and offers the band a contract, to which they reluctantly agree. Wing arranges a stage and sound system to be airlifted to the roof where the band will play their song for the now huge crowd outside. However, the band find that only the PA system is real and everything else is just props. Refusing to lip sync to their tape, they instead destroy their instruments in protest to the delight of the crowd and stage dive into the hands of the cheering audience that O'Malley has his men let through.

The band later plays a gig in prison where they are incarcerated as Kayla and Suzzi dance in the background. The concert is shown live on MTV. Now their manager, Ian says on the phone to an unknown person that the band will start touring upon their release in six months, three months if they behave themselves. A postscript states that the Lone Rangers ultimately serve three months in prison for kidnapping, theft, and assault with hot pepper sauce. Their album Live in Prison goes triple platinum.

== Cast ==
- Brendan Fraser as Chester "Chazz Darby" Ogilvie, the lead guitarist and lead vocalist of the Lone Rangers
- Steve Buscemi as Rex, the bassist of the Lone Rangers
- Adam Sandler as Pip, the drummer of the Lone Rangers and Rex's brother
- Chris Farley as Officer Wilson, a police officer involved in dealing with the hostage crisis
- Michael McKean as Milo Jackson, the station manager of KPPX
- Judd Nelson as Jimmie Wing, a self-serving record executive at Palatine Records that has repeatedly denied Chazz
- Ernie Hudson as Sergeant O'Malley, the head of a SWAT team involved in dealing with the hostage crisis
- Amy Locane as Kayla, Chazz's ex-girlfriend
- Michael Richards as Doug Beech, the accountant at KPPX
- Joe Mantegna as Ian "The Shark", a laid back DJ at KPPX
- Nina Siemaszko as Suzzi, a worker at KPPX
- Marshall Bell as Carl Mace, a SWAT officer involved in dealing with the hostage crisis that would prefer to use force in dealing with the hostage crisis
- Reginald E. Cathey as Marcus, a worker at KPPX
- David Arquette as Carter, a worker at KPPX
- Michelle Hurst as Yvonne, a secretary at KPPX
- Harold Ramis as Chris Moore, an undercover LAPD detective who poses as a Capitol Records A&R executive in order to gain entry into KPPX to no avail
- Allen Covert as Officer Samuels, a police officer who was the first to arrive at KPPX at the start of the hostage crisis
- Rob Zombie as himself
- Kurt Loder as himself
- Lemmy Kilmister as School Magazine Editor Rocker
- Rich Wilkes as Corduroy Pants Rocker
- John Melendez as Constant Masturbating Rocker

Cameos

- The band Galactic Cowboys perform in the film as the band The Sons of Thunder.
- Mike Judge voices Beavis and Butt-Head, who call in to the radio station during the hostage situation and end up infuriating the Lone Rangers with their comments.
- White Zombie appears in the bar scene when Officer Wilson is searching for Kayla, playing the track they recorded for the film "Feed the Gods".

== Production ==
=== Casting ===
Metallica, Cannibal Corpse and Testament were approached for the bar scene but declined to appear.

=== Location ===
The KPPX radio station was located at Fox Plaza in Los Angeles, which served as Nakatomi Plaza in the 1988 film Die Hard.

=== Music ===
The film features an original song by White Zombie and the soundtrack went on to chart on the Billboard 200, peaking at #157. In addition, there are re-recordings of songs from Motörhead and Primus. Jay Yuenger and Sean Yseult also accompanied with Brendan Fraser's vocal rendition of "Degenerated", a song by hardcore punk band Reagan Youth. The song was produced by Yuenger and Bryan Carlstrom.

A number of songs can be heard in the film but not included on the soundtrack album. These are: "Baby Huey (Do You Wanna Dance)" by Dim Stars, "Shamrocks and Shenanigans (Boom Shalock Lock Boom) [Butch Vig Mix]" by House of Pain, "Unsatisfied" by The Replacements, "Rocks" by Primal Scream, "Janie's Got a Gun" by Aerosmith, "Wheezing" by David Byrne and "Don't Hate Me Because I'm Beautiful" by Galactic Cowboys.

== Reception ==
=== Box office ===
The film debuted in tenth place, grossing US$1.9 million in its opening weekend, and grossed only half its budget.

=== Critical response ===
On Rotten Tomatoes the film has an approval rating of 32% based on 38 reviews. The site's critical consensus states: "There's a biting satire that keeps threatening to burst out of the well-cast Airheads, but unfortunately, the end result lives down to its title in the most unfortunate ways." On Metacritic, the film has a score of 46 out of 100, based on 18 critics, indicating "mixed or average" reviews. Audiences polled by CinemaScore gave the film an average grade of "B-" on an A+ to F scale.

Peter Travers of Rolling Stone gave the film a rare positive review: "Fraser and Buscemi are deadpan delights. And Sandler, Opera Man on SNL, is a red-hot screen find."

=== Year-end lists ===
- 9th worst – Sean P. Means, The Salt Lake Tribune
- Top 18 worst (alphabetically listed, not ranked) – Michael Mills, The Palm Beach Post
- Dishonorable mention – Dan Craft, The Pantagraph
- Worst (not ranked) – Bob Ross, The Tampa Tribune

=== Soundtrack ===
Airheads (Original Soundtrack)

Soundtrack album by Various artists
- Released: July 19, 1994
- Recorded: 1994
- Genres: Rock, heavy metal, punk rock
- Length: 49:14
- Label: Fox Records/Arista Records
- Producer: Lonn Friend

Singles from Airheads (Original Soundtrack)
- 1. "Born to Raise Hell" Released: November 1994

Professional ratings
Review scores
Source	Rating
Allmusic	3/5 stars

No.	Title	Writer(s)	Performed by	Length
1.	"Born to Raise Hell"	Ian "Lemmy" Kilmister	Motörhead with Ice-T and Whitfield Crane	4:57
2.	"I'm the One" (Van Halen cover)	Eddie Van Halen, Alex Van Halen, Michael Anthony, David Lee Roth	4 Non Blondes	3:58
3.	"Feed the Gods"	Rob Zombie, Sean Yseult, Jay Yuenger, Phil Buerstatte	White Zombie	4:05
4.	"No Way Out"	Jesse Malin, Richard Bacchus, Howard Kusten	DGeneration	4:26
5.	"Bastardizing Jellikit"	Les Claypool, Larry LaLonde, Tim "Herb" Alexander	Primus	4:11
6.	"London" (The Smiths cover)	Morrissey, Johnny Marr	Anthrax	2:54
7.	"Can't Give In"	Kevin Martin, Peter Klett, Bardi Martin, Scott Mercado	Candlebox	3:15
8.	"Curious George Blues"	Scott Hackwith	Dig	4:03
9.	"Inheritance"	Tommy Victor, Ted Parsons	Prong	2:11
10.	"Degenerated"	Paul Bakija, Dave Rubenstein	The Lone Rangers	3:53
11.	"I'll Talk My Way Out of It"	John Melendez, Randy Cantor	Stuttering John	3:40
12.	"Fuel"	Darrel Brannock, Mark Smirl, Michael Tobin, Tim Mohn	Stick	4:57
13.	"We Want the Airwaves"	Joey Ramone, Johnny Ramone, Dee Dee Ramone	Ramones	3:21
Total length:				49:14
