= Thunder Kiss '65 =

Single by White Zombie

from the album La Sexorcisto: Devil Music Volume One
- B-side: "Welcome to Planet Motherfucker/Psychoholic Slag"
- Released: March 23, 1992
- Recorded: May 1991
- Studio: 321, New York City
- Genre: Groove metal; funk metal; hard rock; alternative rock
- Length: 3:54
- Label: Geffen
- Songwriter: White Zombie
- Producer: Andy Wallace

White Zombie singles chronology
"Thunder Kiss '65" (1992)	"Black Sunshine" (1992)

Music video
- "Thunder Kiss '65" on YouTube

"Thunder Kiss '65" is a song by American heavy metal band White Zombie, released in 1992 from the band's third studio album, La Sexorcisto: Devil Music Volume One (1992). The song was released as their first official single and was later included on compilations, such as Rob Zombie's Past, Present & Future (2003) and The Best of Rob Zombie (2006).

== Background ==
The song was released three times as a single before it gained the attention of Mike Judge and its video was aired on Beavis and Butt-head in 1993. Actor lines are heard from the 1965 exploitation film Faster, Pussycat! Kill! Kill!. The popularity of the single resulted in White Zombie's first Grammy nomination for Best Metal Performance later that year. In May 2006, the song was ranked number 32 on VH1's list, '40 Greatest Metal Songs'.

A mix of the song, alongside the opening of "Closer" by Nine Inch Nails, was used by Extreme Championship Wrestling for their weekend syndicated show from 1994–1997.

The song was used to introduce Puck in the original broadcast of the 1994 season of The Real World: San Francisco.

The song was featured on the 2005 video game Guitar Hero as a cover version performed by WaveGroup. It was also featured in the video game True Crime: New York City also released in 2005.

The song was used in the 2007 movie, Wild Hogs, starring Tim Allen, John Travolta, Martin Lawrence, and William H. Macy.

== Music video ==
The song's music video gained significant airplay on MTV. This helped greatly to increase the band's popularity especially after having been played during the MTV animated series Beavis and Butt-head on the episode "Yogurt's Cool". The video was directed by Juliet Cuming and features the band playing the song out in a desert with dancers and monsters. According to Rob, it is the lowest budgeted music video released by the band.

== Releases ==
First single track listing (1992)

1. "Thunder Kiss '65 (LP version)" – 3:54
2. "Welcome to Planet Motherfucker/Psychoholic Slag (LP version)" – 6:21

Second single track listing (1993)

1. "Thunder Kiss '65 (Finger on the Trigger remix)" – 6:19
2. "Welcome to Planet Motherfucker/Psychoholic Slag (LP version)" – 6:21
3. "Black Sunshine (Indestructible "Sock It to Me" Psycho-Head mix)" – 4:58
4. "Thunder Kiss '65 (The Diabolical Ramrodder remix)" – 6:17

== Charts ==
Chart	Peak position
US Mainstream Rock	26
RIANZ Singles Chart	47
