= Tom Five =

American guitarist

- Birth name: Thomas Neil Guay
- Also known as: Tom Guay, Tom 5
- Born: October 11, 1965 (age 59); Bridgeport, Connecticut, U.S.
- Genres: Doom metal; noise rock; sludge metal; stoner metal
- Occupation: Musician
- Instruments: Guitar; vocals
- Years active: 1987–present
- Member of: Triple T
- Formerly of: White Zombie; Angel Rot; Sonic Medusa; Yidhra

Thomas Neil Guay (born October 11, 1965), more commonly known by his stage name Tom Five (or Tom 5), is an American guitarist who joined heavy metal band White Zombie while studying art at Parsons School of Design which he attended from 1985 to 1989. Guay is more widely known as Tom Five, reportedly because his style "sounded like five guitarists playing at once". He played guitar for the metal band Angel Rot from 1988 to 2003, releasing the album Unlistenable Hymns of Indulgent Damage in 1999. He was also performed in the band Sonic Medusa and in the Black Sabbath tribute band Rat Salad. He currently plays guitar for the Los Angeles band Triple T.

== Discography ==
=== With White Zombie ===
- Psycho-Head Blowout (1987)
- Soul-Crusher (1987)

=== With Angel Rot ===
- Unlistenable Hymns of Indulgent Damage (1999)
