= Caroline Records =

American record label

Caroline
- Parent company: Universal Music Group (2012–present); Previously: Thorn EMI (1992–1996); EMI (1996–2012)
- Founded: 1973
- Founder: Richard Branson
- Status: Active
- Distributors: Virgin Music Group, Universal Music Group, Capitol Music Group
- Genre: Various
- Country of origin: United Kingdom, United States
- Location: New York City

Caroline label design in the UK

Caroline Records is a record label that was founded in 1973 in the United Kingdom to showcase British progressive rock groups. The label ceased releasing titles in 1976, and then re-emerged in the United States in 1986. The label released the work of American punk rock, thrash metal and new wave music bands. Caroline had a number of subsidiary labels, including Astralwerks, Gyroscope, Caroline Blue Plate, Beat the World, Scamp and Passenger. In 2013, the brand was relaunched by Universal Music via the Capitol Music Group.

== UK label ==
The original Caroline record label started as a subsidiary of Richard Branson's Virgin Records from 1973 to 1976. It specialized in inexpensive LPs by progressive rock and jazz artists that lacked commercial appeal. Caroline Records rarely mentioned a connection with Virgin, and some UK and European Virgin albums that were distributed internationally (instead of being manufactured in each country) named Caroline as their American distributor. The first release was Outside the Dream Syndicate by Tony Conrad and Faust in 1973. The logo was a photographic-style variation of Virgin's "Twins" logo, designed by Roger Dean.

== US label ==
In 1983, the Caroline name was reused by Virgin in the US as the importer Caroline Distribution. Caroline Distribution founded the current Caroline Records in 1986. Some Caroline Records CDs issued in the US, bore the label name Caroline Blue Plate, especially Virgin UK originally-issued progressive rock records. Caroline Records was merged into Virgin Records after Virgin was acquired by Thorn EMI. Caroline Distribution was separated and became part of EMI Music Distribution. In 2013, the brand was revived by Universal Music Group under Capitol Music Group. Later, in 2021, the label transferred to Virgin Music Label & Artist Services (now Virgin Music Group). Keith Wood, the co-founder of Caroline Records, died in April 2026 from ALS.

== France label ==
Caroline France was created in 2014 by Thomas Lorain following a call from Caroline who wanted a subsidiary in France. Caroline France renamed itself Virgin Records France in 2021 following the launch of Virgin Music Label & Artist Services.

== Primo Scree ==
Primo Scree was an imprint of Caroline Records created by Ned Hayden of the Action Swingers, who had previously been a sales rep at Caroline. Its releases included the Action Swingers' single "Fear of a Fucked Up Planet", as well as Gumball's debut album Special Kiss and Monster Magnet's debut album Spine of God.

== Notable releases ==
- 50 Cent – Animal Ambition
- Audio Active & Laraaji – The Way Out Is the Way In
- Kevin Ayers, June Campbell Cramer & Brian Eno – Lady June's Linguistic Leprosy
- Bad Brains – Quickness
- Ben Folds Five – Ben Folds Five (under Passenger Records)
- Harold Budd Reuben Garcia Daniel Lentz – Music for 3 Pianos
- Cabaret Voltaire – The Drain Train
- Cabaret Voltaire – Drinking Gasoline
- Cherry Poppin' Daddies – Kids on the Street
- Cluster – Grosses Wasser (CD reissue)
- Cluster – One Hour
- Lol Coxhill – Fleas in Custard
- Dumblonde – Dumblonde
- Drop Nineteens – Delaware
- Egg – The Civil Surface
- Beowülf – Lost My Head... But I'm Back on the Right Track
- Brian Eno – Before and After Science
- Eno Moebius Roedelius – After the Heat (CD reissue)
- Brian Eno & Jah Wobble – Spinner
- Excel – Split Image
- Excel – The Joke's on You
- Excel – Seeking Refuge
- Fred Frith – Guitar Solos
- Various artists – Guitar Solos 2
- Gilgamesh – Gilgamesh
- Gong – Camembert Electrique
- Gong – Angel's Egg
- Gong – You
- Goo Goo Dolls – Goo Goo Dolls
- Heatmiser – Mic City Sons
- Henry Cow – Concerts
- Hole – Pretty on the Inside
- Bat For Lashes–Two Suns
- Bat For Lashes – Fur and gold
- Idaho – Year After Year
- Idaho – This Way Out
- Idaho – Three Sheets to the Wind
- Jabula – Thunder into our hearts
- Killing Joke – Killing Joke
- Korn – The Paradigm Shift
- KT Tunstall – Kin (under Sony/ATV Music Publishing)
- Jayce Lewis/Protafield – Nemesis
- Mercyful Fate – Melissa
- The Misfits – Static Age
- Monster Magnet – Tab
- NF – Perception
- NF – The Search
- NF – Hope
- Oh Wonder – Oh Wonder
- Andy Partridge/Harold Budd – Through the Hill
- Primus – Frizzle Fry
- Smashing Pumpkins – Gish
- Southern Culture on the Skids – For Lovers Only
- Steven Wilson – To the Bone
- Suicidal Tendencies – Join the Army
- Suicideboys – I Want to Die in New Orleans
- Swans – Children of God
- Tangerine Dream – Livemiles
- Tangerine Dream – Pergamon
- Tony Conrad with Faust – Outside the Dream Syndicate
- Uncle Slam – Say Uncle
- Underdog – The Vanishing Point
- Various artists – Greasy Truckers Live at Dingwalls Dance Hall
- Van Morrison – Keep Me Singing (2016)
- Walt Mink – Bareback Ride
- Walt Mink – Miss Happiness
- Warzone – Don't Forget the Struggle, Don't Forget the Streets
- White Zombie – Gods on Voodoo Moon (cassette version only)
- White Zombie – Soul-Crusher
- White Zombie – Make Them Die Slowly
- White Zombie – God of Thunder
- Youth of Today – We're Not in This Alone
