= God of Thunder (EP) =

EP by White Zombie
- Released: October 1989
- Recorded: 1989
- Studios: Chung King House of Metal, New York City
- Genre: Groove metal
- Length: 14:07
- Label: Caroline
- Producer: Daniel Rey

White Zombie chronology
Make Them Die Slowly (1989)	God of Thunder (1989)	La Sexorcisto: Devil Music Volume One (1992)

God of Thunder is an EP by White Zombie which was released in 1989 by Caroline Records. It was the band's first release with Jay Yuenger on guitar. The EP contains "God of Thunder", originally a Kiss song from their 1976 album Destroyer, and "Disaster Blaster II", a reworked version of "Disaster Blaster" from their 1989 album Make Them Die Slowly.

== Music ==
The release continued the band's shift to a more groove-oriented sound that had already begun on Make Them Die Slowly, released the same year, and was ultimately established on 1992's La Sexorcisto: Devil Music, Vol. 1.

"Star Slammer", which was originally cut from the Make Them Die Slowly recording sessions, was also re-recorded around the time of this EP's release. However, it was left off the EP.

== Release and reception ==
Professional ratings
Review scores
Source	Rating
AllMusic	3/5 stars
Chicago Tribune	3/4 stars
Pitchfork	7.6/10

In an interview on Loudwire, Rob Zombie denied making the album cover to provoke Gene Simmons in order to gain press coverage. In fact, Simmons never filed any sort of lawsuit or complaint against the band for the cover art of the album. On May 31, 2006, Zombie fronted a supergroup which performed "God of Thunder" at the VH1 Rock Honors.

Everett True of Melody Maker magazine gave the EP an enthusiastic and unconventional review, stating, "THIS one kicks some serious ass. I think that's all you need to know."

== Track listing ==
All lyrics are written by Rob Zombie; all music is composed by White Zombie, except God of Thunder written by Paul Stanley.

Side one
No.	Title	Length
1.	"God of Thunder" (Kiss cover)	3:52

Side two
No.	Title	Length
1.	"Love Razor"	5:19
2.	"Disaster Blaster II"	4:56

== Personnel ==
Adapted from the God of Thunder liner notes.

White Zombie

- Ivan de Prume – drums
- Sean Yseult – bass
- Jay Yuenger – guitar
- Rob Zombie – vocals, illustrations

Production and additional personnel

- Tom Coyne – mastering
- Greg Gordon – engineering
- Daniel Rey – producer
- Warren Shaw – assistant engineering
- Ernesto Urdaneta – cover art, photography

== Release history ==
Region	Date	Label	Format	Catalog
United States	1989	Caroline	LP	CAROL 1457
