= Black Sunshine =

Single by White Zombie

from the album La Sexorcisto: Devil Music Volume One
- Released: July 14, 1992
- Recorded: May, 1991 at 321 Studios, New York City
- Genre: Groove metal; hard rock
- Length: 4:48
- Label: Geffen
- Songwriters: Rob Zombie; White Zombie
- Producer: Andy Wallace

White Zombie singles chronology
"Thunder Kiss '65" (1992)	"Black Sunshine" (1992)	"More Human than Human" (1995)

Audio
- "Black Sunshine" on YouTube

"Black Sunshine" is a song initially featured on the album La Sexorcisto: Devil Music Volume One by White Zombie which was used as a promo single in 1992 and 1993. The song can also be found on Rob Zombie's Past, Present & Future and the greatest hits album The Best of Rob Zombie. A spoken word section was recorded by Iggy Pop for the intro and was used in the song's final cut.

== Music and lyrics ==
The song is about a racing car, a Ford Mustang, called "Black Sunshine". Iggy Pop recorded the spoken word vocal intro and outro of the song "Black Sunshine" as well as playing the character of a writer in the video shot for the song. He is singled out for special thanks in the liner notes of album. The audio sample "I work on this baby the same way, trying to get maximum performance," is taken from the 1965 movie Faster, Pussycat! Kill! Kill!. Also, the lyrics contain the words "to the devil a daughter comes," most likely a reference to the movie To the Devil a Daughter. It is in 6/4 and 4/4 time with a tempo of 167 beats per minute.

Iggy Pop's spoken intro is as follows:

Gripping the wheel, his knuckles went white with desire
The wheels of his Mustang exploding on the highway like a slug from a .45
True death: 400 horsepower of maximum performance piercing the night
This is Black Sunshine…

== Reception ==
The song was released as a single after "Thunder Kiss '65" initially failed to receive attention on U.S. radio. It became a minor success, charting at #39 on the US Mainstream Rock Tracks. However, the song has gone on to be a fan favorite and has appeared on Rob Zombie's solo greatest hits albums, but is rarely played during his solo act.

== Music video ==
The music video of the song, which was filmed in black and white, features the band playing in the basement of an old dilapidated house. The animated characters Beavis and Butthead provided support for the band by "reviewing" the video during the episode "Home Improvement." Iggy Pop also plays the character of a writer in the video.

== Track listings ==
=== First single (1992) ===
1. "Black Sunshine" (LP version) – 4:48
2. "Thunder Kiss '65" (Swingers Lovers mix) – 4:46
3. "Thunder Kiss '65" (Swinging Lovers extended mix) – 6:10

=== Second single (1992) ===
1. "Black Sunshine" (LP version) – 4:48
2. "Black Sunshine" (Indestructible 'Sock It to Me' Psycho-Head mix) – 4:58

=== Third single (1993) ===
1. "Black Sunshine" (edit) – 3:55
2. "Black Sunshine" (LP version) – 4:48

== In popular culture ==
- The music video appears on the Beavis and Butt-Head episode "Home Improvement".
- The song was covered by the band Lesser Known for the White Zombie tribute album Super-Charger Hell in 2000.
- A remix titled "Black Sunshine (Indestructible 'Sock It to Me' Psycho-Head Mix)" is featured in the 2000 film Wings of the Crow.
- A cover version performed by WaveGroup is featured in Guitar Hero III: Legends of Rock.
- Since 17 February 2009, the master recording is downloadable content for Rock Band series music video game series, but audio samples are omitted.
- The song is available as a downloadable song for the video game Rocksmith 2014.

== Charts ==
Chart	Peak position
US Mainstream Rock	39
