= La Sexorcisto: Devil Music Volume One =

Studio album by White Zombie
- Released: March 30, 1992
- Recorded: May 1991
- Studio: 321 Studios (New York City)
- Genres: Groove metal; alternative metal
- Length: 57:30
- Label: Geffen
- Producer: Andy Wallace

White Zombie chronology
God of Thunder (1989)	La Sexorcisto: Devil Music Volume One (1992)	Astro-Creep: 2000 (1995)

Singles from La Sexorcisto: Devil Music Volume One
- 1. "Thunder Kiss '65" Released: March 23, 1992; 2. "Black Sunshine" Released: July 14, 1992

Audio
- "Album" playlist on YouTube

La Sexorcisto: Devil Music Volume One is the third studio album by American heavy metal band White Zombie, released on March 30, 1992, through Geffen Records. The album marked a major artistic and commercial turning point for the band. After the recruitment of guitarist Jay Noel Yuenger, White Zombie was able to successfully embrace the metal sound they had pursued since Make Them Die Slowly (1989), while incorporating groove-based elements into their sound as they evolved away from their roots in punk rock and noise rock. The album was the band's last to feature drummer Ivan de Prume.

The album was a critical and commercial success for White Zombie after the artistic failure of Make Them Die Slowly. La Sexorcisto became the band's first album to chart on the Billboard 200, peaking at number 26 in 1993. The singles "Thunder Kiss '65" and "Black Sunshine" received heavy rotation on rock radio and MTV, the former earning the band their first Grammy nomination for Best Metal Performance. The album has been certified two times platinum by the Recording Industry Association of America (RIAA) in the United States. It has since been regarded as one of the greatest heavy metal albums of all time.

== Album information ==
The album's sound is primarily groove metal with multiple B-movie samples. Rob Zombie explained he "wanted to keep a groovable dance element in the music", a trait that he found was often absent in metal music of the era. Iggy Pop provided a spoken introduction to the single "Black Sunshine".

In a 2021 interview, Sean Yseult reflected that the band were influenced by rap music during this time, including Ice-T, Run-DMC, LL Cool J, and Public Enemy: "Rob was very intent on merging some of the rhythms and beats of what we were hearing into some of our songs, and it worked well."

Contrary to rumors, a "Devil Music Volume Two" was never planned for recording or release. Almost every song on the album made an appearance on the 1994 video game Way of the Warrior.

== Release and promotion ==
La Sexorcisto was a commercial success for White Zombie, climbing up the charts in the US and gaining massive MTV video airplay and mainstream rock radio airplay with "Thunder Kiss '65" and "Black Sunshine". Although released in early 1992, La Sexorcisto did not enter the Billboard 200 until 1993, after the success of "Thunder Kiss '65", which reached number 26 on the Mainstream Rock chart. It was certified Double Platinum by the RIAA, and gold by the CRIA.

White Zombie toured for two years to promote La Sexorcisto. The tour was a critical success and some archived footage of the shows can be seen on the Let Sleeping Corpses Lie DVD. White Zombie began a five-month U.S. tour in April 1992, supporting such bands as My Sister's Machine, Paw, Testament, Pantera, Trouble and Crowbar. In the fall of 1992, the band opened for Danzig on their How the Gods Kill tour in Europe and the United States, and wrapped up the year doing a brief U.S. tour, again supporting Pantera. White Zombie spent most of 1993 and 1994 touring non-stop in support of La Sexorcisto. They toured with Monster Magnet in February and March 1993 and with Anthrax and Quicksand that summer. White Zombie embarked on two more U.S. tours: one with Chemlab and Nudeswirl in the fall of 1993, and another with Prong and The Obsessed in early 1994. The La Sexorcisto tour concluded in May 1994 with four Japanese shows, which were supported by Pantera.

== Critical reception and legacy ==
Professional ratings
Review scores
Source	Rating
AllMusic	4.5/5 stars
Chicago Tribune	2.5/4 stars
Collector's Guide to Heavy Metal	7/10
The Encyclopedia of Popular Music	4/5 stars
Kerrang!	4/5 stars
Metal Forces	80/100
MusicHound Rock	4/5 stars
Record-Journal	B+
Rock Hard	9/10
The Rolling Stone Album Guide	3/5 stars

Upon release, La Sexorcisto: Devil Music Volume One received generally favourable critical reviews. Greg Kot of the Chicago Tribune called the album a "tuneless but entertaining free-for-all", praising its guitar and sampling arrangements. Similarly, Peter Atkinson of the Record-Journal described it as "Deliberately sloppy, as 'Psychoholic Slag', 'Cosmic Monsters Inc.' and 'Grindhouse (A Go-Go)' indicate, and delightful because of it." Don Kaye of Kerrang! praised the album's overall heaviness, describing the experience of listening to White Zombie as akin to "being trapped alive inside a blurry, scratchy, black and white print of that one horror movie that scared the living shit out of you when you were a kid. Check it out, and you'll begin to understand." Denise Stillie of Metal Forces opined that, in spite of a lack of standout tracks, "the overall power of the album is undeniable".

Retrospective reviews of the album have been widely positive. Jacob N. Lunders of AllMusic claimed that La Sexorcisto "Perhaps [co-defined] the future of heavy metal, [...] nearly [equalling] fellow classics Guns N' Roses's Appetite for Destruction, The Cult's Electric, and Soundgarden's Badmotorfinger in significance". John A. Riley of PopMatters described the album as both an "exemplary metal album" and, noting its heavy use of samples, "an exemplary postmodern collage on par with better regarded non-metal LPs such as Brian Eno and David Byrne's My Life in the Bush of Ghosts (1981) and the Beastie Boys Paul's Boutique (1989)". Chris Krovatin of Kerrang! argued that the album's success proved that, "Even as grunge and alt-rock introduced new levels of vulnerability and introspection to heavy music" in the 1990s, "people still wanted something powerful and fun [...] with La Sexercisto [White Zombie] provided all the druggy, creepy, high-octane heavy metal that fans craved, even if they were too focused on looking disillusioned and thoughtful to admit it." On the eve of the album's 30th anniversary in 2022, MetalSucks called La Sexorcisto “a monumental moment in metal history, an example of how weird, far-out, and fun metal could be at a time where it was shaking on its legs."

In 1995, Raw listed La Sexorcisto as one of the 90 essential albums of the 1990s. In 2002, the album was ranked at number 85 on Hit Parader's list of "Heavy Metal's All-Time Top 100 CDs". In 2004, it was voted as the 195th greatest heavy metal album of all time in Martin Popoff's book of The Top 500 Heavy Metal Albums of All Time. In 2005, it placed at number 282 on Rock Hard's list of "The 500 Greatest Rock & Metal Albums of All Time". In 2016, Loudwire ranked La Sexorcisto at number 89 on its list of the "Top 90 Hard Rock + Metal Albums of the 90's". Rolling Stone ranked the album at number 93 on its list of the 100 Greatest Metal Albums of All Time in 2017; in 2023, the same magazine listed "Thunder Kiss '65" as the 84th greatest metal song of all time.

== Track listing ==
All lyrics are written by Rob Zombie; all music is composed by White Zombie (Sean Yseult, Jay Yuenger, Ivan de Plume, R. Zombie).

No.	Title	Length
1.	"Welcome to Planet Motherfucker/Psychoholic Slag"	6:21
2.	"Knuckle Duster (Radio 1-A)"	0:21
3.	"Thunder Kiss '65"	3:54
4.	"Black Sunshine" (featuring Iggy Pop)	4:49
5.	"Soul-Crusher"	5:07
6.	"Cosmic Monsters Inc."	5:13
7.	"Spiderbaby (Yeah-Yeah-Yeah)"	5:01
8.	"I Am Legend"	5:08
9.	"Knuckle Duster (Radio 2-B)"	0:25
10.	"Thrust!"	5:04
11.	"One Big Crunch"	0:21
12.	"Grindhouse (A Go-Go)"	4:05
13.	"Starface"	5:02
14.	"Warp Asylum"	6:44
Total length:		57:30

Some pressings of the CD incorrectly divide tracks 12 and 13, beginning track 13 at 3:31 of "Grindhouse (A Go-Go)".

== Sample overview ==
#	Title	Samples
1	"Welcome to Planet Motherfucker/Psychoholic Slag"	0:25 – The explosion and sounds of growling is taken from the 1989 anime Urotsukidōji: Legend of the Overfiend.; 1:31 – "Fuckin' kiss me." is Tori Welles, sampled from the first scene of "True Confessions of Tori Welles" (with Tori Welles and Jerry Butler).; 1:48 – "Now let's move", "but let's take the back door" and the sample right at the end of the song are from the 1965 exploitation film Faster, Pussycat! Kill! Kill!.; 2:40 – "Oh, wow!"/"Cool it." and "You wanna start a rumble?" are taken from the 1958 crime drama film High School Confidential.; 4:14 – "Do you have to open graves to find girls to fall in love with?" is taken from the 1932 horror film The Mummy.; 4:35 – "Get up and kill!" is taken from the 1978 zombie film Dawn of the Dead.; 5:43 – "Hula fast shorts, swing with a gassy chick. Turn on to a thousand joys, smile on what happened. Then check what's gonna happen, you'll miss what's happening. Turn your eyes inside and dig the vacuum. Tomorrow, drag" is Phillipa Fallon performing beat poetry in the 1958 teen film High School Confidential.
2	"Knuckle Duster (Radio 1-A)"	0:02 – "Ahorre, no compre sin visitar Empori..." is taken from a radio ad in Spanish. Translates to "Save, don't buy without visiting Empori..."; 0:07 – "We know how fast we can go" is taken from the 1965 cult film Faster, Pussycat! Kill! Kill!; 0:17 – "These are the facts as we know them. There is an epidemic of mass murders being committed by a virtual army of unidentified assassins" is taken from the 1968 horror film Night of the Living Dead during a radio broadcast.; 0:17 – The screaming in the background (sans falling lumber) is from the first scene of "True Confessions of Tori Welles" (with Tori Welles and Jerry Butler), approximately 10 minutes in.
3	"Thunder Kiss '65"	1:28 – "You're all shook up, aren't you baby? I never try anything. I just do it. Wanna try me?" is taken from the 1965 exploitation film Faster, Pussycat! Kill! Kill!
4	"Black Sunshine"	3:25 – "I work on this baby the same way, trying to get maximum performance" is taken from the 1965 exploitation film Faster, Pussycat! Kill! Kill!
5	"Soul-Crusher"	0:00 – "Drop it, buster!" is taken from the 1958 crime drama film High School Confidential
6	"Cosmic Monsters Inc."	0:00 – "Meanwhile, behind the façade of this innocent-looking bookstore" is taken from the "Zelda the Great" episode of 1966 Batman television series.; 1:26 – "You're all shook up, aren't you baby?" is taken from the 1965 exploitation film Faster, Pussycat! Kill! Kill!; 3:20 – "They come from the bowels of hell..." is taken from the trailer for the 1959 science fiction film Plan 9 from Outer Space; 4:16 – "The only thing square about this world are the cats what live in it!" is taken from the 1958 crime drama film High School Confidential
7	"Spiderbaby (Yeah-Yeah-Yeah)"	0:00 – The bell sounds at the beginning of the song are from the 1988 horror film Hellbound: Hellraiser II; 2:23 – The ominous chanting that listeners hear is in fact the score from the 1976 horror film The Omen; 4:00 – The Arabic chanting is taken from The Exorcist
8	"I Am Legend"	--
9	"Knuckle Duster (Radio 2-B)"	0:00 – "Now, what we have to ask is why is it that God has admonished us to hate evil? Well, first of all, God loves ..." from a sermon by Atlanta pastor, Dr. Charles Stanley.; 0:09 – "Y cuando tu vuelvas.." Daniel Santos – "Como se van las noches"; 0:14 – "... And strangled them and finally dismembered their bodies"; 0:20 – "homelessness and all that ..." sample are the words of the American radio talk show host Rush Limbaugh.; 0:21 – "And now, the voice you've been waiting for ..."
10	"Thrust!"	0:00 – The speaking at the introduction of this song is taken from the 1989 anime Urotsukidōji: Legend of the Overfiend; 1:50 – "It has been established..." sample is taken from the 1968 zombie film Night of the Living Dead
11	"One Big Crunch"	0:00 – The music in the background is from the 1968 horror film Night of the Living Dead.; 0:01 – "Only parts of the corpse had been removed" is from the 1974 horror film The Texas Chainsaw Massacre.; 0:10 – "He steps to the water and plunges in, making far more impression on his skull than on the lady" is from a 1950s teen instructional swimming film.
12	"Grindhouse (A Go-Go)"	--
13	"Starface"	0:00 – "One. One is the beginning..." and "Oh Herbert, you are stiff!" samples from the beginning and end of the song are taken from the 1969 episode of Star Trek: The Original Series entitled "The Way to Eden"; 0:18 – "X minus 5 seconds..." sample is taken from the 1950 science fiction film Rocketship X-M; 2:27 – In the background there is an eerie jingle playing; this is from 1979's Phantasm. This sound effect was used earlier as the shuttlecraft interior sound effects throughout the run of the aforementioned Star Trek: The Original Series. (On the album Star Trek: Sound Effects from the Original TV Soundtrack, it is Track 69—do a search for "shuttlecraft interior" on YouTube for confirmation.)
14	"Warp Asylum"	6:13 – ""Thank you so very much! God bless you all. Have a ball, and goodnight." Near the end part of "Let's Do It," a track on "Jayne Mansfield Busts Up Las Vegas"; 6:23 – "A few of these sentences have already begun to take root in your subconscious mind, haven't they? If you play the record a few more times, you'll be amazed at how easily you have begun to understand." (source unknown)

== Personnel ==
Adapted from the La Sexorcisto: Devil Music Volume One liner notes.

White Zombie

- Rob Zombie – vocals
- Jay Yuenger – guitars
- Sean Yseult – bass
- Ivan de Prume – drums

Additional musicians

- Iggy Pop – spoken word (track 4)

Production and additional personnel

- Kristin Callahan – photography
- David Carpenter – assistant engineer
- Alison Dyer – photography
- Michael Golob – cover art, art direction
- Andy Wallace – production, engineering, mixing
- Howie Weinberg – mastering
- Sean Yseult – art direction, design
- Rob Zombie – illustrations, art direction

== Chart positions ==
Album

Chart (1993–1994)	Position
US Billboard 200	26
Heatseekers	2

Singles

Single	Chart (1993)	Position
"Thunder Kiss '65"	US Mainstream Rock Tracks	26
"Thunder Kiss '65"	New Zealand Albums Chart	47
Single	Chart (1994)	Position
"Black Sunshine"	US Mainstream Rock Tracks	39

== Certifications ==
Region	Certification	Certified units/sales
Canada (Music Canada)	Gold	50,000^{^}
United States (RIAA)	2× Platinum	2,000,000^{^}
^{^} Shipments figures based on certification alone.

== Release history ==
Region	Label	Date	Format	Catalog #
Europe	Geffen	March 30, 1992	CD, CS, LP	GEF 24460
United States	Geffen	March 31, 1992	CD, CS, LP	GEF 24460
Europe	Music on Vinyl	April 19, 2012	LP	MOVLP534
Europe	Music on Vinyl	September 29, 2017	LP	MOVLP534

== Bibliography ==
- Anon. (March 28, 1992). "New Releases" (PDF). Music Week. pp. 12, 21 – via worldradiohistory.com.
- Anon. (March 20, 1992). "Heavy Hitters" (PDF). The Hard Report. No. 268. p. 46 – via worldradiohistory.com.
- Anon. (November 2002). "Heavy Metal's All-Time Top 100 CDs". Hit Parader. No. 458. Hit Parader Publications, Inc. p. 37.
- Atkinson, Peter (April 24, 1992). "Off the Record". Record-Journal. p. 27.
- Estlund, Kristina (March 23, 1992). "Kristina's Airhead Airwaves" (PDF). HITS. Vol. 6, no. 284. p. 63 – via worldradiohistory.com.
- Fabricus, Jodie (May 29, 1992). "Metal Filings" (PDF). The Hard Report. No. 278. pp. 21–22.
- Graff, Gary (1999). "White Zombie". MusicHound Rock: The Essential Album Guide. Visible Ink Press. p. 1224. ISBN 1-57859-061-2.
- Gross, Joe (2004). "White Zombie". In Brackett, Nathan; Hoard, Christian (eds.). The New Rolling Stone Album Guide (4th ed.). Simon & Schuster. pp. 870–71. ISBN 9780743201698.
- Johnson, Howard, ed. (July 19, 1995). "90 for the '90s: The Essential Albums". Raw. No. 180. EMAP. p. 47.
- Kaye, Don (March 28, 1992). "Rekordz". Kerrang!. No. 385. EMAP. p. 24.
- Kot, Greg (April 30, 1992). "Recordings". Chicago Tribune. p. E9. ProQuest 1696403596.
- Larkin, Colin, ed. (2007). "White Zombie". Encyclopedia of Popular Music (5th concise ed.). Omnibus Press. pp. 1487–1488. ISBN 978-0857125958.
- Mühlmann, Wolf-Rüdiger (2005). "La Sexorcisto: Devil Music Vol. 1". In Rensen, Michael (ed.). Best of Rock & Metal - Die 500 stärksten Scheiben aller Zeiten [The 500 Greatest Albums of All Time] (in German). Rock Hard. p. 99. ISBN 3-89880-517-4.
- Popoff, Martin (2004). "La Sexorcisto: Devil Music Vol. 1". The Top 500 Heavy Metal Albums of All Time. ECW Press. p. 165. ISBN 1-55022-600-2.
- Popoff, Martin (2007). The Collector's Guide to Heavy Metal: Volume 3: The Nineties. Burlington, Ontario, Canada: Collector's Guide Publishing. p. 499. ISBN 978-1-894959-62-9.
- Stillie, Denise (April 1992). "Albums". Metal Forces. No. 71. pp. 76–77 – via Internet Archive.
