= Paul Kostabi =

Estonian musician

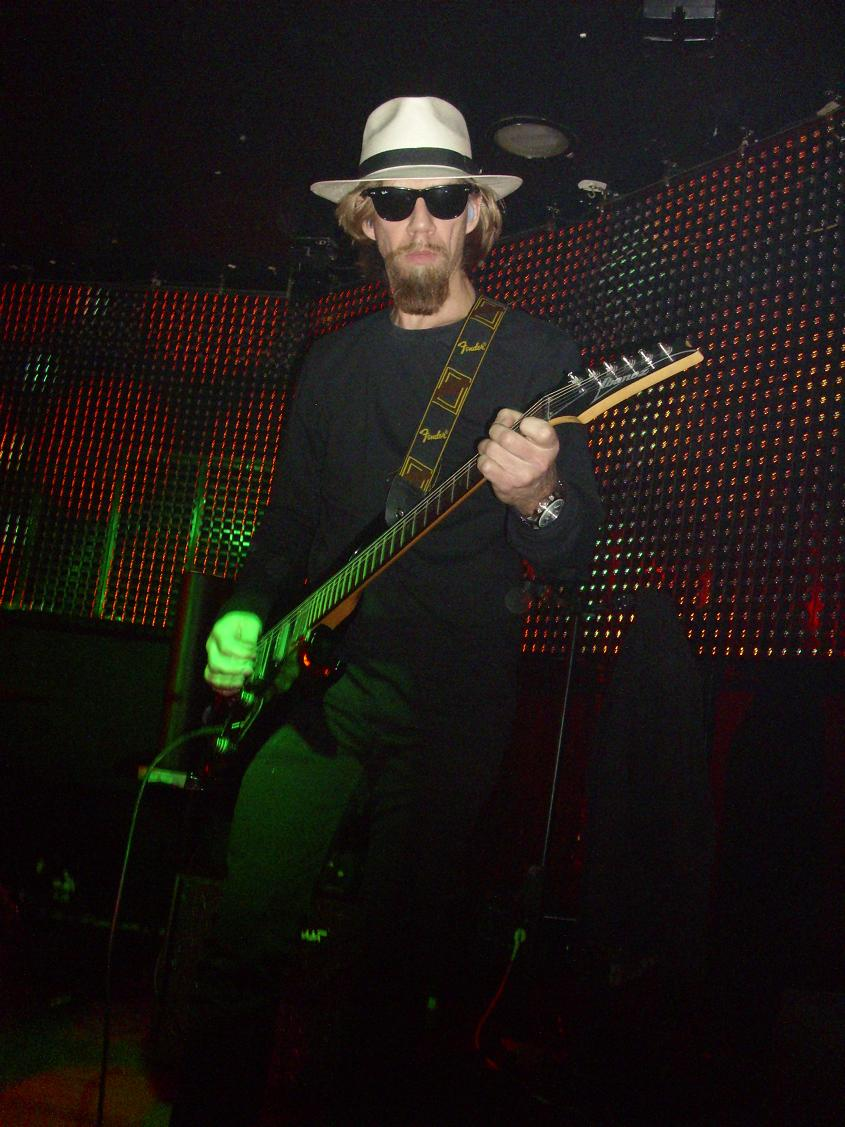
- Kostabi playing with Psychotica in 2009

Background information
- Born: Paul Indrek Kostabi; October 1, 1962 (age 63); Whittier
- Origin: Whittier, California, United States
- Genres: Alternative metal, thrash metal, surf rock, punk rock
- Occupation: Musician
- Instrument: Guitar
- Years active: 1980–present

Paul Indrek Kostabi (also known as Ena; born October 1, 1962 in Whittier, California, United States) is an Estonian American visual artist, musician, record producer and audio engineer. He is the brother of the visual artist and musician Mark Kostabi.

Kostabi was a founding member of the bands Youth Gone Mad, White Zombie, and Psychotica. Kostabi currently performs with Tony Esposito in the group Kostabeats and with Walter Schreifels band Dead Heavens.

Kostabi became part of the CBGB Festival in 2014 exhibiting paintings alongside photographers Bob Gruen, Michael Lavine and Chris Stein. He also painted live in Times Square while Devo and Jane's Addiction performed.

Kostabi is credited with naming the painting Use Your Illusion by Mark Kostabi, which became the title for Guns N' Roses studio albums volume 1 and 2.

In 2012, he launched brand Bad Things with artwork on various electronic device covers such as iPhones.

In 2015, Kostabi launches his character sprkl through Gallerie F in Kranenburg at the Art Karlsruhe art fair with a solo exhibition, of paintings sculpture and prints of the character.

In 2016, Kostabi #sprkl character featured in Pokémon GO game.

Also in 2016, Kostabi art featured in Architectural Digest.

Paul Kostabi paintings are present in permanent collections of:

- Paterson Museum, New Jersey
- Guggenheim Museum, New York
- New England Museum of Art, Brooklyn, Connecticut
- Millennium Museum
- Whitney Museum of Art, Video, Paper Tiger Sessions
- Museion Museum, Bolzano, Italy
