= White Zombie (band) =

American heavy metal band (1985–1998)

- White Zombie c. 1995. Left to right: John Tempesta, Sean Yseult, Jay Yuenger, and Rob Zombie.

Background information
- Origin: New York City, U.S.
- Genres: Groove metal; industrial metal; alternative metal; noise rock (early)
- Works: Discography
- Years active: 1985–1998
- Labels: Silent Explosion; Caroline; Geffen
- Past members: Rob Zombie; Sean Yseult; Ena Kostabi; Peter Landau; Ivan de Prume; Tim Jeffs; Tom Five; John Ricci; Jay Yuenger; Phil Buerstatte; John Tempesta
- Website: whitezombieofficial.com

White Zombie was an American heavy metal band that formed in 1985. Based in New York City, they started as a noise rock band, releasing three EPs and one studio album in that style before changing to a heavy metal-oriented sound that broke them into the mainstream. The albums La Sexorcisto: Devil Music Volume One (1992) and Astro-Creep: 2000 (1995) established them as an influential act in groove metal and industrial metal, respectively. Their best-known songs include "Thunder Kiss '65", "Black Sunshine" and "More Human than Human". The group officially disbanded in 1998. In 2000, White Zombie was included on VH1's 100 Greatest Artists of Hard Rock, ranking at No. 56. As of October 2010, the band has sold six million albums, according to Nielsen SoundScan.

== History ==
=== Early career, name, and independent releases (1985–1986) ===
White Zombie was co-founded by Rob Zombie, after coming up with the band idea in 1985 while attending Parsons School of Design in his junior year. Zombie named the band after a 1932 horror movie starring Bela Lugosi called White Zombie, considered the first true zombie movie (the movie title was also the source for Rob Zombie's stage name, as he was born Robert Cummings).

Zombie's girlfriend at the time, Sean Yseult, was the other co-founder. She had been playing the Farfisa keyboard in the band Life with Ivan de Prume, but the band soon broke up. Ena Kostabi owned a recording studio, which he would rent out to different bands. When he met Yseult, she asked if he could teach her to play bass. They then recruited Peter Landau to play drums and began to write and record songs. White Zombie's first release, Gods on Voodoo Moon, was an EP and was recorded on October 18, 1985. It was released under the band's label Silent Explosion, where they would release most of their early work. Only 300 copies were pressed, of which only 100 were sold; the band members still retain possession of the remaining 200.

In 1986, Zombie hired Tim Jeffs, his Parsons School of Design roommate, to play guitar to replace Ena Kostabi, and Yseult brought in de Prume from their days in the band LIFE as the replacement for Landau. The band made their live performance debut at CBGB on April 28, 1986, and started touring. White Zombie released their second EP, Pig Heaven, that year. The release contained two songs, "Pig Heaven" and "Slaughter the Grey". The EP was recorded at 6/8 Studios in NoHo in New York City. Other songs that were recorded during the session but never released were titled "Follow Wild", "Rain Insane", "Paradise Fireball", and "Red River Flow". After touring for a year in the band, Tim Jeffs left and was replaced by Tom Guay, often known as Tom Five. The band released a second pressing of Pig Heaven with different cover art, but retained the same recording with Jeffs on guitar. Only 500 copies of each pressing were released on vinyl.

=== First two albums (1987–1990) ===
In 1987, the band released their third EP, Psycho-Head Blowout. Later that year, the band released their first full-length album, Soul-Crusher, which was their first release to feature sound clips from movies in the songs, a signature that would continue for the remainder of the band's lifespan.

In 1988, the band signed to Caroline Records, permanently discontinuing their own indie label. After completing their first U.S. tour in June 1988, Tom Guay was asked to leave the band. He was replaced by John Ricci the following month. Their second album, Make Them Die Slowly, was released in March 1989. The album was a musical shift for White Zombie. While their previous releases had been strictly punk-influenced noise rock, Make Them Die Slowly has demonstrably more of a heavy metal sound. This was also the first album crediting "Rob Zombie" instead of his previous stage name, "Rob 'Dirt' Straker".

Ricci's carpal tunnel syndrome severely affected his ability to play guitar, forcing him to leave the band when Make Them Die Slowly was finished. Jay "J" Yuenger replaced him before the album's release, affecting their future sound. One of the most obvious examples of this direction is the difference between the songs "Disaster Blaster" on Make Them Die Slowly and the re-worked version, "Disaster Blaster II", on the God of Thunder EP.

=== Major label years, mainstream success, and breakup (1991–1998) ===
After searching for a record label and being turned down multiple times, the band turned toward RCA Records. However, Zombie opted for a recording contract with Geffen Records. Michael Alago, a representative of Geffen, became interested after hearing God of Thunder and watched one of their shows at Pyramid Club and liked them, mostly for their song "Soul-Crusher". The band produced a demo with the help of J. G. Thirlwell of Foetus and were signed to Geffen.

On March 17, 1992, White Zombie released La Sexorcisto: Devil Music Volume One, the album which launched them into mainstream recognition. The music videos for the songs "Thunder Kiss '65", "Black Sunshine" and "Welcome to Planet Motherfucker/Psychoholic Slag" (censored as "Welcome to Planet M.F.") went into regular rotation on MTV's Headbangers Ball, while each music video was featured on the TV show Beavis and Butt-head. This boosted the band's popularity, and led to La Sexorcisto selling over two-million copies in the U.S. alone. Rob Zombie later credited the appearances on Beavis and Butt-head as critical to the band's success ("We went from selling 500 records a week to 30,000"), and he also became friends with series creator Mike Judge.

The band supported La Sexorcisto with a lengthy tour of about 30 months. White Zombie gained mainstream attention due to the success of La Sexorcisto and to appearances on tours with prominent metal or hard rock bands such as Pantera, Danzig, Kyuss, Testament, Megadeth, Sepultura, Suicidal Tendencies, Anthrax, Quicksand, Monster Magnet, Nudeswirl, Prong and the Obsessed. During the tour, Ivan de Prume left the band to open his own recording studio, Burningsound. He was replaced by Phil Buerstatte. During this period, White Zombie had recorded several songs for movie soundtracks and various artists compilation albums, including "Feed the Gods" for the soundtrack to Airheads, "I Am Hell" for The Beavis and Butt-Head Experience compilation album and a cover version of Black Sabbath's "Children of the Grave", which appears on the tribute album Nativity in Black; each of these songs received airplay on active rock radio stations, while a music video "Feed the Gods" was released.

By the time White Zombie entered the studio in late 1994 to begin recording their fourth album, Zombie and Yseult had ended their relationship, and Buerstatte was dismissed from the band, due to artistic differences; he was replaced by former Exodus and Testament drummer John Tempesta. In 1995, Astro-Creep: 2000 was released, which featured a more industrial sound and included the hit single "More Human than Human". The album was another success for the band, debuting at number six on the Billboard 200 (White Zombie's highest-ever chart position), and within a year after its release, it was certified double platinum by the RIAA. To support Astro Creep 2000, the band toured non-stop for approximately fifteen months, playing with a wide variety of acts such as Metallica, Soundgarden, the Ramones, the Melvins, The Reverend Horton Heat, Babes in Toyland, Kyuss, Filter, Everclear, the Toadies, CIV and Pennywise. In the summer of 1996, White Zombie played its final dates, co-headlining a North American tour with Pantera.

Also in 1996, an album of remixes was released under the title Supersexy Swingin' Sounds. After making one last song for the film Beavis and Butt-head Do America, titled "Ratfinks, Suicide Tanks and Cannibal Girls", White Zombie broke up in September 1998.

=== After disbanding (1998–present) ===
After the breakup of White Zombie, Sean Yseult released her first album with surf rock band The Famous Monsters, having started the band in between Zombie tours. She also started playing bass for horror-themed New Orleans–based band, Rock City Morgue, and briefly played bass for The Cramps.

Tempesta continued his musical relationship with Zombie, drumming for him on his first two solo albums, Hellbilly Deluxe and The Sinister Urge. After leaving the Zombie touring band, Tempesta went on to play for Scum of the Earth, a metal band of musicians affiliated with Rob Zombie. Tempesta has toured with Testament (as shown on Testament's DVD, Live In London). On February 14, 2006, he was hired as the permanent drummer for The Cult, after a brief stint with Helmet.

J. produced records for Fu Manchu and New York–based Puny Human.

In July 2006, original members Tom Five and de Prume reunited to perform with de Prume's band, Healer, a middle eastern infused metal band, for several concerts in Southern California for The Vans Warped Tour. De Prume continues to write and record music with Healer, as well as recording, producing and engineering for special projects in his studio, Burningsound. His drums and percussion work can also be heard on Sony's "Ghost Rider" score. In 2009, de Prume began hosting the weekly radio show, "Metalopolis". His studio guests have included Rob Halford, Dave Mustaine, Max Cavalera, Vinnie Paul and Tom Araya. De Prume is also a member of the band KREEP, and has completed a West Coast tour in spring 2010, and is planning an East Coast tour in fall 2010.

In November 2008, Geffen/UME released Let Sleeping Corpses Lie, a boxed set which includes sixty four tracks featuring every White Zombie album and EP (except the remix albums), all remastered. The package also contained nine music videos (including their breakthrough Grammy-nominated hit "Thunder Kiss '65"), and ten live performances. In an interview to promote the release of Let Sleeping Corpses Lie, Zombie made it clear that a reunion with his White Zombie bandmates was unlikely, saying, "I don't want fans to think it's the beginning of anything."

In December 2010 Yseult released I'm in the Band, a book containing tour diaries and photos as well as detailing her eleven years spent as a member of White Zombie.

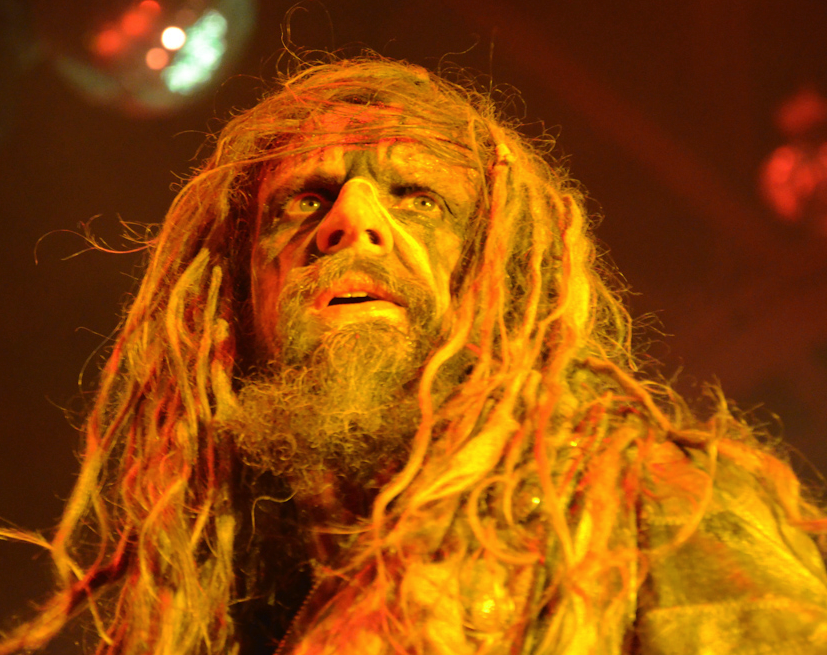
Rob Zombie in 2011

Since the breakup of White Zombie, Rob Zombie has shown little interest in reforming the band. In June 2011, in an interview with Metal Hammer magazine, he was asked why White Zombie split up, to which he replied: "It had run its course. Success is a big thing that you can never plan for, because it affects everybody differently. I don't want to blame myself or anyone else in the band — it's just that the band didn't work anymore. Rather than continuing on and making shitty records and having it all fall apart, I thought: 'Let's just end it on a high point.'" Zombie also stated earlier in 2011 that a White Zombie reunion would never happen and he had not been in contact with any members of the band "except John Tempesta in about 15 years." In 2018, Yseult mirrored his comments, saying that, in regards to the breakup, "[she] was definitely ready for [the band] to be over with", and that she stayed in touch with most other band members aside from Zombie.

In May 2013, former drummer Phil Buerstatte died. Shortly after his death, he was impersonated by con-artist Loren Dean Breckenridge III. Breckenridge was previously accused of defrauding rehab centers across the nation, and repeatedly impersonating character actor Loren Dean.

In a November 2015 interview with Artisan News, Yseult stated that a White Zombie vinyl box set was due for release in 2016. On February 16, 2016, It Came from N.Y.C. was confirmed for a June 3 release via the Numero Group. The vinyl box set contains remastered versions of all the pre-Geffen Records material (including unreleased tracks) on 5 LPs/3 CDs, a 108-page colored booklet complete with liner notes and rare photos, a discography, and a shirtography.

On May 18, 2016, Riot Fest released their lineups and it was revealed that Rob Zombie would be performing Astro-Creep: 2000 in its entirety at the Chicago weekend. This sparked a swirl of speculation, coupled with the recently reunited Misfits, that a White Zombie reunion would also be occurring at the festival. When asked in September 2016 about his refusal to reform White Zombie, Rob replied, "[I am] always amazed at how people can speak with such authority on subjects they know zero about. I have many legit reasons. Just because you don't know them does not mean they don't exist. Everything is not everybody's business." Guitarist J. said, however, that he and bassist Sean Yseult could do an "Astro Creep, 'more original members' tour", and added that they "joke about it sometimes". On May 22, 2017, Rob posted a short snippet of audio, to his Instagram account, of a live recording of the White Zombie song "Electric Head Part 2", with a comment stating he was in the process of mixing the Astro Creep 2000 live set from the Chicago date of the 2016 Riot Fest. Rob and his band would once again play the Astro Creep 2000 record in its entirety at the 2025 Louder Than Life Festival in Louisville, Kentucky.

In 2026, Rob Zombie dismissed any talks of a reunion with the band, saying he has "moved on from it".

== Musical style ==
White Zombie initially emerged from New York City's noise rock scene, influenced by Honeymoon Killers, Swans and Pussy Galore, 1970s rock of Van Halen, Kiss and AC/DC, as well as Black Sabbath, the Cramps and gothic rock. White Zombie was considered a New York Underground band. The introduction of Jay Noel Yuenger into the band, according to AllMusic's Greg Prato, "helped toughen up the band's sound even further -- inching closer to a heavy metal band more than ever before." White Zombie changed their style from noise rock to a groove metal sound, and would come to be associated with the alternative metal scene of the 1990s. Rob Zombie was also introducing elements of industrial rock into the band's sound, making White Zombie "one of the few hard rock bands of the era that you could also dance to." The LA Weekly placed White Zombie within the nu metal scene and said that the band's "whirling rhythms driving dance-rock ragers" helped the band stand out. MTV described the band as "horror rock" and a "horror obsessed industrial-metal band." White Zombie fused "B-horror movie visuals and subject matter with heavy music and growled vocals", according to AllMusic's Greg Prato. AllMusic's Bradley Torreano, reviewing the album Soul Crusher, wrote that Rob Zombie's "wonderfully phantasmagoric lyrics blend bizarre phrases and unique rhymes."

== Band members ==
=== Final lineup ===
- Rob Zombie – vocals (1985–1998)
- Sean Yseult – bass (1985–1998)
- Jay Yuenger – guitars (1989–1998)
- John Tempesta – drums (1994–1998)

== Discography ==
- Soul-Crusher (1987)
- Make Them Die Slowly (1989)
- La Sexorcisto: Devil Music Volume One (1992)
- Astro-Creep: 2000 (1995)
