= Jay Yuenger =

American guitarist

Jay Noel Yuenger
- Also known as: J.
- Born: Jay Noel Yuenger
- Origin: Chicago, Illinois, U.S.
- Genres: Alternative metal; groove metal; hardcore punk; industrial metal
- Occupations: Musician, record producer, recording engineer
- Instrument: Guitar
- Years active: 1982–present
- Formerly of: White Zombie

Jay Noel Yuenger also known by the stage name "J.", is an American rock guitarist best known for his work with heavy metal band White Zombie.

== Career ==
As a teenager, Yuenger's interests quickly progressed from pop to hard rock to hardcore punk. A resident of Chicago's Hyde Park neighborhood, then one of a handful of racially integrated neighborhoods in the city, he was exposed to soul, jazz, folk, and the electric blues.

He began learning guitar as a student at Kenwood Academy and played a small part in the early 1980s Chicago hardcore punk scene, forming the teen punk band Rights of the Accused in 1982. They released the 7-inch EP, Innocence, in 1983 and opened for several noteworthy groups including Minor Threat, MDC, the Big Boys, Flipper, and Discharge. Yuenger left the band in 1985, attended college, and by 1987 had moved to New York City.

After several failed attempts at forming groups in New York and New Jersey, he met the members of White Zombie in early 1989 and auditioned successfully to join the group as their guitar player. The band released the previously recorded Make Them Die Slowly on Caroline Records, toured the US and Europe, and recorded the God of Thunder 12-inch EP (also issued on Caroline). In 1990, White Zombie signed to Geffen Records and recorded their major label debut, La Sexorcisto: Devil Music Volume One, which eventually went on to sell over 2 million copies. During the next five years the band was almost constantly on tour, pausing only to record the triple platinum-selling Astro-Creep: 2000. They also contributed songs to various movie soundtracks and compilation albums and ended up selling over 6 million records worldwide.

Since the official disbandment of White Zombie in 1997, Yuenger has lived in Los Angeles, Chicago, and New York and has worked as a recording engineer and record producer. In 2004, he recorded King Louie Bankston's King Louie One Man Band LP entitled Chinese Crawfish, which was released on Goner Records. He currently lives in Madrid.

== Discography ==
Rights of the Accused

| Year | Name | Ref |
|---|---|---|
| 1987 | Dillinger's Alley | |

White Zombie

| Year | Name | Ref |
|---|---|---|
| 1989 | God Of Thunder (EP) | |
| 1992 | La Sexorcisto: Devil Music Volume One | |
| 1995 | Astro-Creep: 2000 | |

Other appearances

| Year | Name | Artist | Ref |
|---|---|---|---|
| 1997 | The Action Is Go | Fu Manchu | |
| 2002 | Black Presence | Bluebird | |
