= Sean Yseult =

American bassist (born 1966)

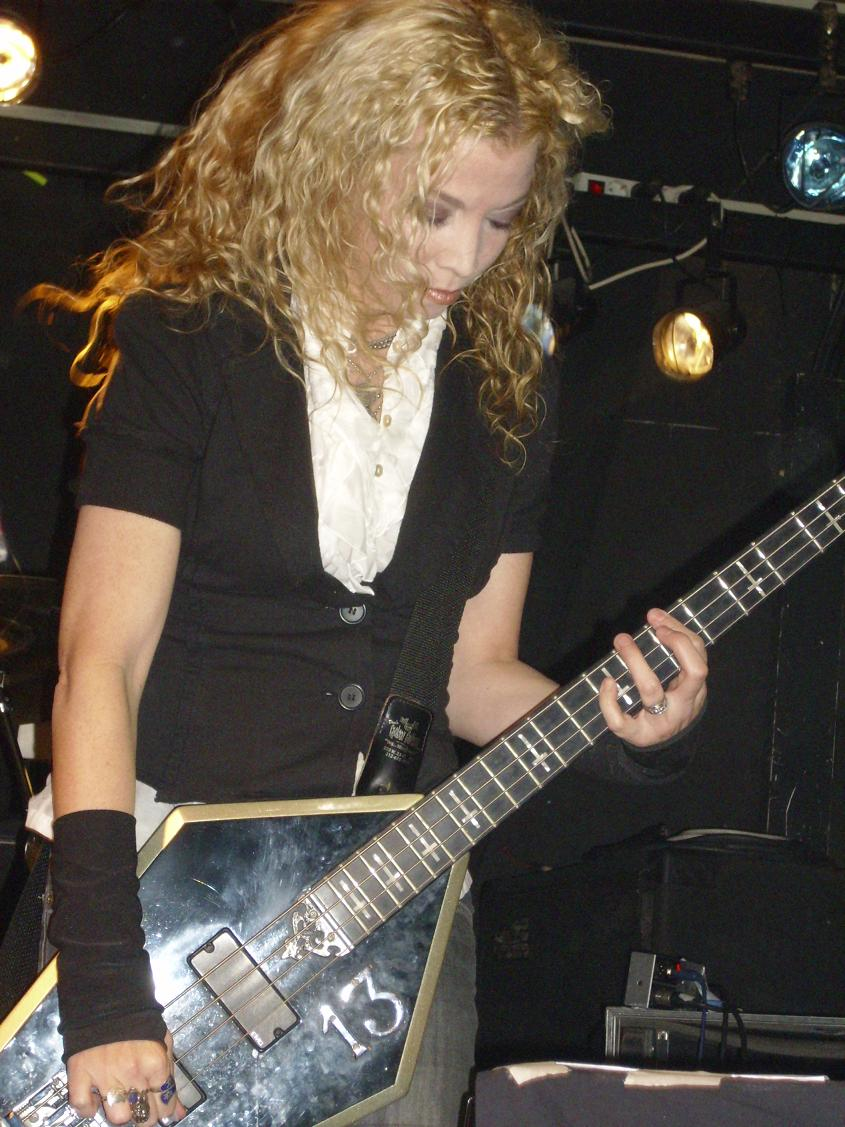
- Yseult performing in 2010

Background information
- Born: Shauna Reynolds; June 6, 1966 (age 60)
- Origin: North Carolina, U.S.
- Genres: Hard rock; heavy metal; groove metal
- Occupation: Musician
- Instrument: Bass guitar
- Years active: 1985–present
- Member of: Star & Dagger
- Formerly of: White Zombie

Sean Yseult (/ɪˈsɔːlt/ iss-AWLT; born Shauna Reynolds; June 6, 1966) is an American bass guitarist who is a member of the rock band Star & Dagger. She is best known as the bassist for heavy metal band White Zombie in the 1980s and 90s.

== Early life and education ==
Her parents were both college English professors. Her mother, Ann Reynolds, taught the poetry of Geoffrey Chaucer, while her father, Michael S. Reynolds, was an authority on the life of Ernest Hemingway.

The atmosphere in the family home was bohemian, with artists and scholars gathering for deep conversation and socializing. Yseult's parents took her and her sister to many artistic events.

Before her days as a bassist, Yseult studied fine art and ballet while attending North Carolina School of the Arts for high school. She moved to New York City and earned her degree in graphic design at Parsons The New School for Design. It was at Parsons where she met eventual bandmate and boyfriend Rob Zombie.

== Career ==
=== Early career / White Zombie ===
Yseult played bass in White Zombie for 13 years before they disbanded in 1998. In 1996, she participated along with Jay Yuenger in the tribute band to the Germs called Ruined Eye. After the breakup of White Zombie in September 1998, Yseult started playing bass for the band Rock City Morgue. She formed the Famous Monsters in 1995 which also featured Katie Lynn Campbell, bassist for the Toronto-based C'mon.

=== Post-White Zombie ===
In 2006, Yseult briefly played bass for and toured with The Cramps.

On November 1, 2010, Yseult released I'm in the Band, a book containing tour diaries and photos as well as detailing her eleven years spent as a member of White Zombie.

When Rock N Roll Experience Magazine asked Yseult in 2011 why she was not involved in the White Zombie box set her reply was, "It was a little bit of a fuck you to me & J. which was kinda weird since we were 2/3rd's of the band but anyways."

== Personal life ==
Yseult was in a relationship with fellow White Zombie co-founder Rob Zombie from 1984 to 1991 after meeting at Parsons School of Design. The two continued to work together after the breakup. Yseult moved to New Orleans in 1996 after White Zombie disbanded. She married Supagroup musician Chris Lee on January 12, 2008 in New Orleans, Louisiana, where she lives. With her husband in 2002, she founded, then ran, a dive bar popular among artists and musicians called The Saint in New Orleans's Garden District.

She began showing her photography in galleries in 2002, and in 2006 she began a design line featuring wallpaper, pillows, scarves with her hand-drawn graphics. Gallery shows included exhibitions in New York City, Los Angeles, San Francisco, and New Orleans. Yseult has also been a member of "The Rawk Show – Fine Art by Musicians" in Texas, among other shows. In 2018, she debuted a photography exhibit titled "They All Axed for You" at the Boyd Satellite Gallery in New Orleans.
