= Ramones (album) =

Studio album by the Ramones
- Released: April 23, 1976
- Recorded: January 1976
- Studios: Plaza Sound, Radio City Music Hall in New York
- Genre: Punk rock
- Length: 29:04
- Label: Sire
- Producer: Craig Leon

Ramones chronology
Ramones (1976)	Leave Home (1977)

Singles from Ramones
- 1. "Blitzkrieg Bop" Released: February 1976; 2. "I Wanna Be Your Boyfriend" Released: September 1976

Ramones is the debut studio album by the American punk rock band Ramones, released on April 23, 1976, by Sire Records. After Hit Parader editor Lisa Robinson saw the band at a gig in New York City, she wrote several articles about the group and asked Danny Fields to be their manager. Fields agreed and convinced Craig Leon to produce Ramones, and the band recorded a demo for prospective record labels. Leon persuaded Sire president Seymour Stein to listen to the band perform, and he later offered the band a recording contract. The Ramones began recording in January 1976, needing only seven days and $6,400 (equivalent to $36,200 in 2025) to record the album.

The album cover, photographed by Punk magazine's Roberta Bayley, features the four members leaning against a brick wall in New York City. The record company paid only $125 ($693.46 in 2024) for the front photo, which has since become one of the most imitated album covers of all time. The back cover depicts an eagle belt buckle along with the album's liner notes. After its release, Ramones was promoted with two singles, which failed to chart. The Ramones also began touring to help sell records; these tour dates were mostly based in the United States, although two were booked in Britain.

Violence, drug use, relationship issues, humor, and Nazism were prominent in the album's lyrics. The album opens with "Blitzkrieg Bop", which is among the band's most recognized songs. Most of the album's tracks are uptempo, with many songs measuring at well over 160 beats per minute. The songs are also rather short; at two-and-a-half minutes, "I Don't Wanna Go Down to the Basement" is the album's longest track. Ramones contains a cover of the Chris Montez song "Let's Dance".

Ramones was unsuccessful commercially, peaking at number 111 on the US Billboard Top LPs & Tape chart. Despite its poor chart performance, it received glowing reviews from critics. Many later deemed it a highly influential record, and it has since received many accolades, such as the top spot on Spin magazine's list of the "50 Most Essential Punk Records". Ramones is widely regarded as one of the greatest and most influential punk albums of all time, and it had a significant impact on other genres of rock music, such as grunge and heavy metal. The album was ranked at number 33 in Rolling Stone's 2003 list of the "500 Greatest Albums of All Time", maintaining the ranking in a 2012 revision and dropping to number 47 in the 2020 reboot of the list. It was placed first in the same publication's list of the "100 Best Debut Albums of All Time" in 2022, and their list of the "100 Greatest Punk Albums of All time" in 2026. It was certified Platinum by the Recording Industry Association of America (RIAA) in 2026 for 1,000,000 copies sold in the US.

== Background ==
Ramones began playing gigs in mid-1974, with their first show at Performance Studios in New York City. The band, performing in a style similar to the one used on their debut album, typically performed at clubs in downtown Manhattan, specifically CBGB and Max's Kansas City. In early 1975, Lisa Robinson, an editor of Hit Parader and Rock Scene, saw the fledgling Ramones performing at CBGB and subsequently wrote about the band in several magazine issues. The group's vocalist Joey Ramone related that "Lisa came down to see us, she was blown away by us. She said that we changed her life; she started writing about us in Rock Scene, and then Lenny Kaye would write about us and we started getting more press like The Village Voice. Word was getting out, and people starting coming down." Convinced that the band needed a recording contract, Robinson contacted Danny Fields, former manager of the Stooges, and argued that he needed to manage the band. Fields agreed because the band "had everything I ever liked" and became the manager in November 1975.

On September 19, 1975, Ramones recorded a demo at 914 Sound Studios, which was produced by Marty Thau. Featuring the songs "Judy Is a Punk" and "I Wanna Be Your Boyfriend", the band used the demo to showcase their style to prospective labels. Producer Craig Leon, who had seen the Ramones perform in the summer of 1975, brought the demo to the attention of Sire Records' president Seymour Stein. After being persuaded by Craig Leon and his ex-wife Linda Stein, Ramones auditioned at Sire and were offered a contract, although the label had previously signed only European progressive rock bands. Drummer Tommy Ramone recalled: "Craig Leon is the one who got us signed, single handed. He brought down the vice president and all these people—he's the only hip one in the company. He risked his career to get us on the label." The label offered to release "You're Gonna Kill That Girl" as a single, but the band declined, insisting on recording an entire album. Sire accepted their request and agreed to release a studio album instead.

== Recording and production ==
Ramones was recorded on the eighth floor of Radio City Music Hall (photographed in 1984).

In January 1976 the band took a break from their live performances to prepare for recording at Plaza Sound studio. Sessions began later that month and were completed within a week for $6,400; the instruments took three days and the vocal parts were recorded in four days. In 2004, Leon admitted that they recorded Ramones quickly due to budget restrictions, but also that it was all the time they needed.

Doing an album in a week and bringing it in for $6,400 was unheard of, especially since it was an album that really changed the world. It kicked off punk rock and started the whole thing—as well as us.

— Joey Ramone

The band applied microphone placement techniques similar to those which many orchestras used. The recording process was a deliberate exaggeration of the techniques used by the Beatles in the early 1960s, with a four-track representation of the devices. The guitars can be heard separately on the stereo channels—electric bass on the left channel, rhythm guitar on the right—drums and vocals are mixed in the middle of the stereo mix. The mixing of the production also used more modern techniques such as overdubbing, a technique used by studios to add a supplementary recorded sound to the material. The band also used a technique known as doubling, where the vocal line used is sung twice.

Recording for the album was expanded by Mickey Leigh (Joey's brother) and Leon with percussion effects, which went unmentioned in the liner notes to the album's release. Author Nicholas Rombes said that the production's quality sounded like "the ultimate do-it-yourself, amateur, reckless ethic that is associated with punk", but concluded that they approached the recording process with a "high degree of preparedness and professionalism".

== Lyrics and composition ==
The songs on Ramones addressed several lyrical themes including violence, male prostitution, drug use, and Nazism. While the moods displayed in the album were often dark, Johnny said that when writing the lyrics they were not "trying to be offensive". Many songs from the album have backing vocals from different guests. Leigh sang backing vocals on "Judy Is a Punk", "I Wanna Be Your Boyfriend", and in the bridge of "Blitzkrieg Bop". Tommy sang backing vocals on "I Don't Wanna Walk Around with You", "Judy Is a Punk", and during the bridge of "Chain Saw". The album's engineer, Rob Freeman, sang backing vocals for the final refrain of "I Wanna Be Your Boyfriend". Leon wrote in the booklet for the album's 2016 reissue that when layered background vocals appear on the album, they are primarily Freeman's contributions combined with some of Leon and Dee Dee's, and a great deal by Leigh, "all compiled and compressed to create an effective cyborg backing vocal creature." The album's length is 29 minutes and four seconds and it contains 14 tracks. On the original issue of the album, all the original songs were credited to "the Ramones" collectively.

When I lived in Birchwood Towers in Forest Hills with my mom and brother. It was a middle-class neighborhood, with a lot of rich, snotty women who had horrible spoiled brat kids. There was a playground with women sitting around and a kid screaming, a spoiled, horrible kid just running around rampant with no discipline whatsoever. The kind of kid you just want to kill. You know, 'beat on the brat with a baseball bat' just came out. I just wanted to kill him.

— Joey Ramone on "Beat on the Brat"

The opening "Blitzkrieg Bop" was written by Tommy, and originally named "Animal Hop". Once Dee Dee reviewed the lyrics, the band changed the wording, the name, and partially the theme. According to Tommy, the song's original concept was about "kids going to a show and having a good time", but the theme became more Nazi-related after its revision. The piece begins with an instrumental interval which lasts about 20 seconds. At the 20th second, the guitar and bass cease, marking Joey's first line, "Hey ho, let's go!" The bass and guitar gradually rebuild and become "full–force" once all the instruments play together in ensemble. The piece resolves by repeating what is played from 0:22–0:33. Stephen Thomas Erlewine from AllMusic described "Blitzkrieg Bop" as a "three-chord assault".

"Beat on the Brat" was said by Joey to have origins relating to the upper class of New York City. Dee Dee, however, explained that the song was about how Joey saw a mother "going after a kid with a bat in his [apartment building's] lobby and wrote a song about it". "Judy Is a Punk" – written around the same time as "Beat on the Brat" — was written by Joey after he walked by Thorny Croft, an apartment building "where all the kids in the neighborhood hung out on the rooftop and drank." The song's lyrics are fictional and refer to two juvenile offenders in Berlin and San Francisco and their possible deaths at the conclusion of the song. "Judy Is a Punk" is the original album's shortest track at 1:32; it is partially derived from the Burl Ives 1953 folk song “There Was An Old Lady Who Swallowed A Fly".

"I Wanna Be Your Boyfriend" – the album's slowest song – was solely written by Tommy and pays homage to love songs by pop music acts of the 1960s. The song used a 12-string guitar, glockenspiel, and tubular bells in its composition, and was said by author Scott Schinder to be an "unexpected romantic streak". "Chain Saw" opens with the sound of a running circular saw and was influenced by the 1974 horror film The Texas Chain Saw Massacre. At nearly 180 beats per minute, "Chain Saw" had the fastest tempo of the album's songs and, according to Rombes, is the most "home-made" sounding. "Now I Wanna Sniff Some Glue" contains four lines of minimalist lyrics that depict youthful boredom and inhaling solvent vapors found in glue. "I hope no one thinks we really sniff glue," said Dee Dee. "I stopped when I was eight [years old]." Dee Dee also explained that its concept came from adolescent trauma. After several songs by the Ramones whose titles began with "I Don't Want to ...", Tommy said that "Now I Want to Sniff Some Glue" is the first positive piece on the album. The song served as an inspiration for one of the first punk fanzines, Mark Perry's Sniffin' Glue.

"I Don't Wanna Go Down to the Basement" is also minimalist, and inspired by horror movies. The entire text is composed of three lines, and the composition was based on three major chords. With a playing time of 2:40, it is the longest piece on the album. (Asked about the bathroom at CBGB, Debbie Harry remarked: "I think that song from the Ramones is partially about that: 'I don't wanna go down to the basement ... ' As kids, we never wanted to go down to the basement cos it was so dark and scary. And that toilet was certainly very scary.") "Loudmouth" has six major chords and is harmonically complex. The song's lyrics are — depending on the reading and punctuation — a single row or four very brief lines. "Havana Affair" has a lyrical concept incorporating the comic strip Spy vs. Spy by Cuban-born illustrator Antonio Prohias. At roughly 170 beats per minute, "Loudmouth" and "Havana Affair" proceed at about the same tempo. "Havana Affair" segues into "Listen to My Heart" – the first of many Ramones songs to voice an ironic and pessimistic perspective on a failing or failed relationship.

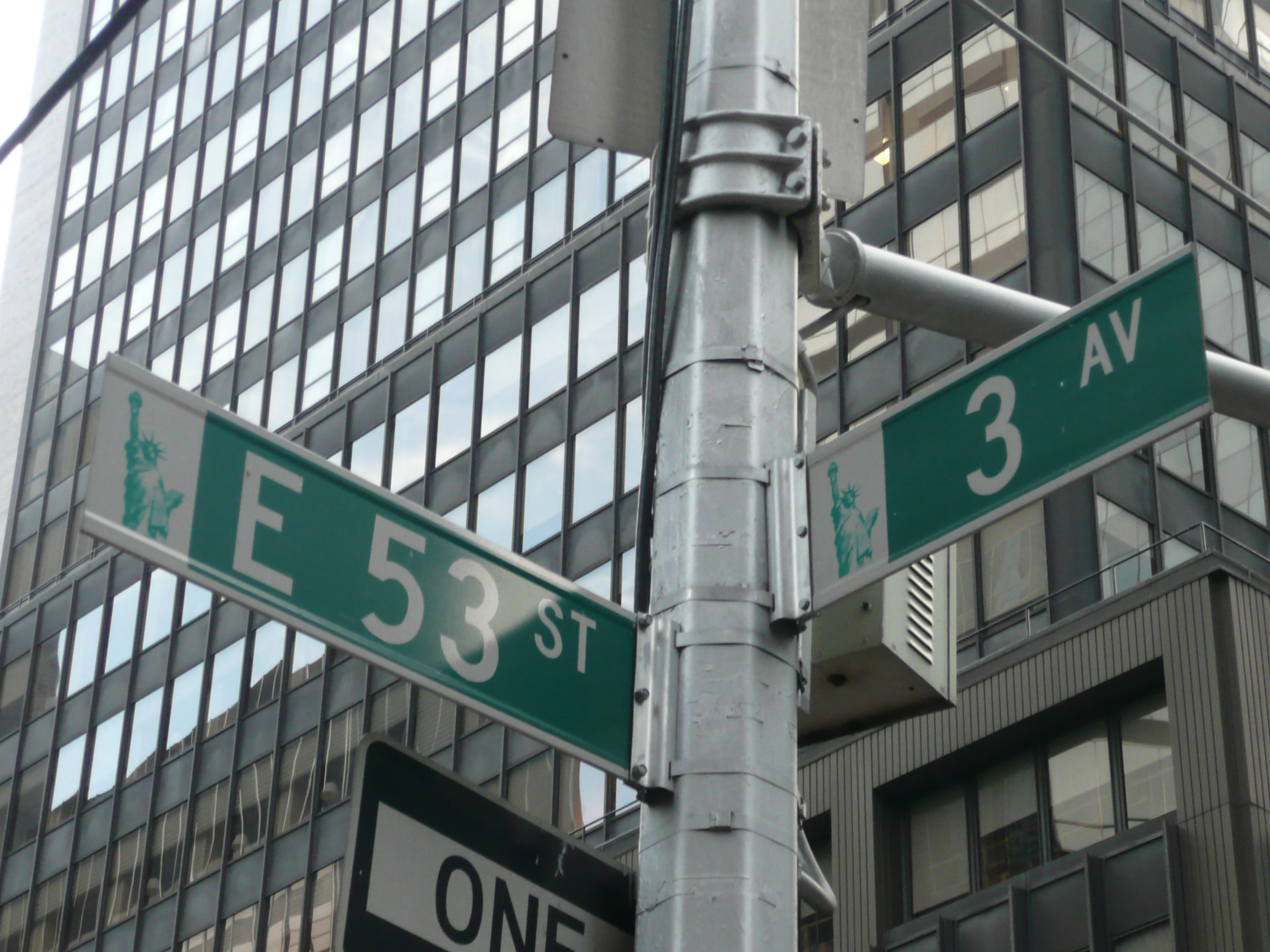
Street signs at the intersection of East 53rd Street and Third Avenue in Midtown Manhattan. The song "53rd and 3rd" is based on the street's reputation for male prostitution.

Written solely by Dee Dee, the lyrics of "53rd & 3rd" concern a male prostitute ("rent boy"), waiting at the corner of 53rd Street and Third Avenue in Midtown Manhattan. When the prostitute gets a customer, he kills the customer with a razor to prove he is not a homosexual. In interviews, Dee Dee described the piece as autobiographical. "The song speaks for itself," Dee Dee commented in an interview. "Everything I write is autobiographical and written in a very real way, I can't even write." According to Danny Fields, "Johnny would never admit to knowing that '53rd and 3rd' was about Dee Dee turning tricks!" The half-sung and half-shouted bridge in "53rd and 3rd" are performed by Dee Dee, whose voice is described by author Cyrus Patell as what "breaks the deliberate aural monotony of the song and emphasizes the violence of the lyric". "Let's Dance" is a cover version of the hit song by Chris Montez, featuring Leon playing Radio City's large Wurlitzer pipe organ. "I Don't Wanna Walk Around with You" consists of two lyric lines and three major chords. One of the group's earliest compositions, written at the beginning of 1974, it was the opener on their first demo. It then segues into the closing track "Today Your Love, Tomorrow the World", which refers to a Hitler Youth member. Seymour Stein complained about its original lyrics — "I'm a Nazi, baby, I'm a Nazi, yes I am. I'm a Nazi Schatze, y'know I fight for the Fatherland" — insisting the track was offensive. When he threatened to remove the track from the album, the band put together alternate lyrics: "I'm a shock trooper in a stupor, yes I am. I'm a Nazi Schatze, y'know I fight for the Fatherland." Stein accepted the revision and it was duly released.

== Artwork and packaging ==
The back cover to the Ramones album was designed by artist Arturo Vega, who produced the photo of a belt buckle in a photo booth.

Initially, the Ramones wanted an album cover similar to Meet the Beatles! (1964) and subsequently had pictures taken in that style by Danny Fields but Sire was dissatisfied with the results. The art direction was by Toni Wadler and, according to cartoonist John Holmstrom, the Meet The Beatles cover idea came out "horribly". Wadler later chose a photo by Roberta Bayley, a photographer for Punk magazine, for the cover. The black and white photograph on the front of the album was originally in an issue of Punk.

The cover photo features (from left to right) Johnny, Tommy, Joey and Dee Dee Ramone, staring at the camera with blank faces. They are all wearing ripped and faded blue jeans and leather jackets, standing upright against the brick wall of a private community garden called Albert's Garden, located in the Bowery neighborhood of New York City between the Bowery and Second Street. The stance of the group members in the photograph would influence their future cover designs as well, with the majority of their succeeding albums using a picture of the band on the front cover. Music historian Legs McNeil states that "Tommy [is] standing on his tip-toes and Joey [is] hunched over a bit." The back cover art, which depicts a belt buckle with a bald eagle and the band's logo, was designed by Arturo Vega. Liner notes on the back cover fail to acknowledge backing vocalists and additional instrument players. Leigh, who performed backing vocals on several tracks, asked guitarist Johnny why he was not mentioned on the record's credits. Johnny replied: "We didn't want people to get confused with who's in the band or who's not. It's our first album, you know, and we didn't want people to get confused."

The artwork became one of the most imitated album covers in music. The image of a band in front of a brick wall dressed in ripped jeans and leather jackets was copied by Alvin and the Chipmunks in Chipmunk Punk. Ramones's artwork was ranked number 58 on Rolling Stone's 1991 list of 100 Greatest Album Covers.

The album sleeve and a poster of the same design are in the permanent collection of the Museum of Modern Art in New York City.

== Promotion ==
=== Singles ===
There were two singles released from the album: "Blitzkrieg Bop" and "I Wanna Be Your Boyfriend". The first was released in February 1976, originally as a 7" split single with "Havana Affair" as its B-side. The release, along with the Ramones 2001 Expanded Edition, featured "Blitzkrieg Bop" remixed as a single version, although it maintains a time of two minutes and twelve seconds. On January 6, 2004, Rhino Entertainment re-released "Blitzkrieg Bop" as a CD single, using "Sheena Is a Punk Rocker" as its B-side. "I Wanna Be Your Boyfriend" was released in September 1976 as a 7" single. It included live versions of "California Sun" and "I Don't Wanna Walk Around with You" as B-sides, recorded at the Roxy Theater in West Hollywood in August 1976. "I Wanna Be Your Boyfriend" was also released in the UK, giving the band a presence in the European marketplace. Even though the song saw some success in the UK and Europe, it failed to chart in the top 50.

=== Touring ===
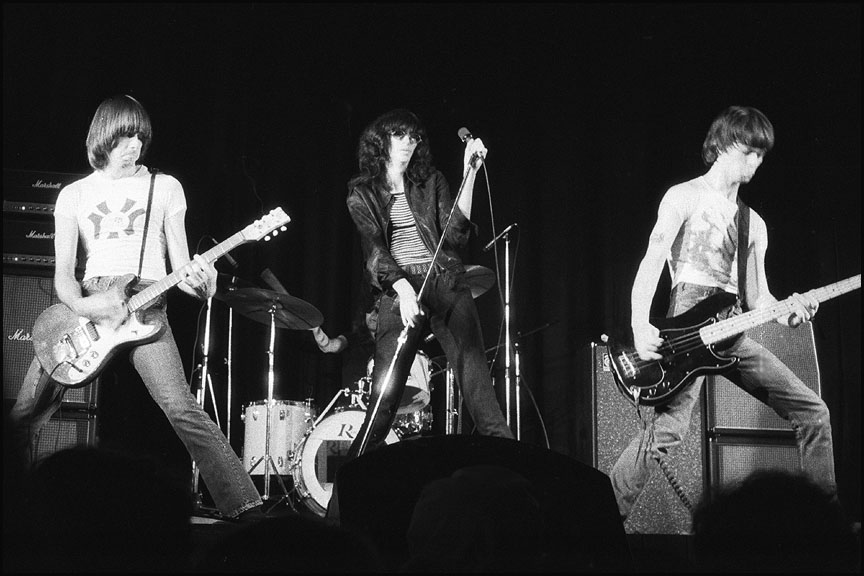
The Ramones performing in 1976 in Toronto

In 1974 the band played 30 performances, nearly all at the New York-based club CBGB. All but one of the band's 1975 gigs were booked for New York City, with Waterbury, Connecticut as the exception. After the album's recording, the Ramones headlined for very few shows, usually opening for an identified cover band which played Aerosmith and Boston. When they opened at Brockton, Massachusetts, the audience appeared extremely uninterested in the Ramones so Johnny swore off playing as an introduction for other bands. Following this, Fields booked several headlining shows around the Tri-state area, and they began playing frequently at gigs like CBGB and Max's Kansas City. After performing with Blondie in New Jersey, they continued their tour to Boston, Massachusetts for three shows. Leigh later said of the tour:

Travelling was difficult. Most of the time, it was just Danny Fields, me, and the members of the band. We'd get two rooms in the hotel, three of us in each. They couldn't afford any more help at that point, so the band had to pitch in unloading the equipment. I'd play the drums during sound checks, while Tommy went out to the board and mixed the sound—and instructed the soundman not to fuck with the settings. We would enlist the aid of any fan willing to help us load out at the end of the night.

At the time, Leigh was road manager, stage manager, chauffeur, and head of security. Vega, who contributed to the album's packaging, helped out with the road crew as much as possible. Tommy's friend Monte Melnick occasionally helped with the audio output, but this was typically done by Leigh.

Following their debut album's release, the band performed at over 60 concerts for its promotion. While most of the gigs were booked in North America, two dates—July 4 and 5—were in London's Roundhouse venue and Dingwalls, respectively. Linda Stein pushed to make these events happen, setting up the band performances in the UK during the United States Bicentennial. Fields relates: "On the two-hundredth anniversary of our freedom, we were bringing Great Britain a gift that was forever going to disrupt their sensibilities." The band sold out for their first London performance, with an audience of roughly 3,000. Leigh described the Dingwalls gig as very similar to performances at CBGB. Likewise, these venues in future were headlined by other punk bands like the Clash and Sex Pistols. The band performed over 100 concerts the following year.

== Reception ==
Professional ratings
Review scores
Source	Rating
AllMusic	5/5 stars
The Austin Chronicle	5/5 stars
Christgau's Record Guide	A
The Guardian	5/5 stars
Mojo	5/5 stars
NME	10/10
Q	5/5 stars
The Rolling Stone Album Guide	5/5 stars
Spin Alternative Record Guide	10/10
Uncut	5/5 stars

Ramones was released on April 23, 1976, by Sire Records and received glowing reviews. In May, John Rockwell of The New York Times published a rave review, saying: "What the Ramones do is deliver a nonstop set of short, brisk, monochromatically intense songs. ... conventional considerations of pace and variety are thrown calculatedly to the winds. The ingredients are simplicity itself." Rockwell noted: "the effect in the end amounts to an abstraction of rock so pure that other associations get left behind." Nick Kent favourably commented in the NME: "This record poses a direct threat to any vaguely sensitive woofer and/or tweeter lodged in your hi-fi ...". Reviewing that same month in The Village Voice, Robert Christgau said that, while the power of the band's music draws from "fairly ominous sources" like Nazi imagery and brutality, he cannot deny the "sheer pleasure" of the music: "For me, it blows everything else off the radio: it's clean the way the Dolls never were, sprightly the way the Velvets never were, and just plain listenable the way Black Sabbath never was." In July, Paul Nelson of Rolling Stone wrote that the album was similar to early rock and roll, and was constructed using rhythm tracks of great intensity.

In August, Creem dubbed The Ramones as "The most radical album of the past six years", saying: "[it] is so strikingly different, so brazenly out of touch with prevailing modes as to constitute a bold swipe at the status quo." Reviewer Gene Sculatti saw it as "a rock 'n' roll reactionary's manifesto" ... "a sharp wedge between the stale ends of a contemporary music scene bloated with graying superstars and overripe for takeover." Critic Joe S. Harrington declared that the album was a huge landmark for music history, proclaiming that "[it] split the history of rock 'n' roll in half." Theunis Bates, a writer for Time, summed the album up with: "Ramones stripped rock back to its basic elements ... lyrics are very simple, boiled-down declarations of teen lust and need." Bates also said that it "is the ultimate punk statement." Kris Needs of ZigZag declared that the album's "mutant vocals and ultra-simplicity of the music and lyrics do take some getting used to, but once you get past the curiosity stage, the effect can be shattering, especially at high volume" and that it was "impossible to mention highlights, 'cos the whole album's a highlight, geared and stripped down for maximum energy and effect." In 1977 Charles M. Young of Rolling Stone regarded Ramones as "one of the funniest rock records ever made and, if punk continues to gain momentum, a historic turning point."

I love this record—love it—even though I know these boys flirt with images of brutality (Nazi especially) in much the same way 'Midnight Rambler' flirts with rape. This makes me uneasy. But my theory has always been that good rock and roll should damn well make you uneasy ...

— Robert Christgau

Later reviews of Ramones tended to praise the album's influence on rock music. In 1995, Jeff Tamarkin of The AllMusic Guide to Rock said that the album ignited the punk rock era, writing: "rock's mainstream didn't know what hit it." In 2001, April Long of NME rewarded the album with a perfect score, remarking that the Ramones were "arguably the most influential band ever", despite their lack of mainstream acceptance. Stephen Thomas Erlewine of AllMusic also deemed the album influential, saying "In comparison to some of the music the album inspired, The Ramones sounds a little tame—it's a little too clean, and compared to their insanely fast live albums, it even sounds a little slow." The album's sound was considered by Erlewine to be "all about speed, hooks, stupidity, and simplicity".

Regardless of this critical acclaim, Ramones was not successful commercially. It only reached No. 111 on the US Billboard Top LPs & Tape chart, and sold 6,000 units in its first year. Outside the US, the album peaked at No. 48 on the Swedish Sverigetopplistan chart.

The album was included in Spin magazine's List of Top Ten College Cult Classics (1995), where it was noted that "everything good that's happened to music in the last fourteen years can be directly traced to the Ramones." Also in 1995, the Spin Alternative Record Guide named it the No. 1 alternative rock album. In 2001, the magazine also included the album in its special issue 25 Years of Punk with a list of The 50 Most Essential Punk Records, where it resided at the top spot. That same year, it was named the fourth best punk album by Mojo, who called it the "coolest, dumbest, simplest, greatest rock'n'roll record ever to be cut by four sweet, dysfunctional screw-ups."

The band was inducted into the Rock and Roll Hall of Fame at the 2002 induction ceremony, with the website stating that their first album changed the rock genre from "bloated and narcissistic", to "basic" rock and roll. In 2003, Ramones was considered by Spin's Chuck Klosterman, Greg Milner, and Alex Pappademas to be the sixth most influential album of all time. They noted that the album "saved rock from itself and punk rock from art-gallery pretension." Q Magazine included the album in their "100 Greatest Albums Ever" (2003) list, where it was listed at No. 74. In 2006, it was chosen by Time as one of the 100 greatest albums ever. Ramones was included in Chris Smith's 2009 book 101 Albums That Changed Popular Music, who said the album "opened a whole new world of garage rock for those fed up with the excesses of existing rock gods." It was also included in the 2005 book 1001 Albums You Must Hear Before You Die. In 2010, it was ranked as the greatest debut album of the year in 1976. It was placed first in the Rolling Stone 100 Best Debut Albums of All Time list in 2022. The album was certified platinum in the US by the RIAA on September 30, 2026. In 2024, Loudwire staff elected it as the best hard rock album of 1976.

In 2016, Rhino Records announced the July 29 release of a 40th-anniversary deluxe edition comprising three CDs and one LP, including stereo and mono mixes of the original album; single mixes, outtakes and demos; and a live 1976 performance.

== Legacy and influence ==
Ramones is considered to have established the musical genre of punk rock, as well as popularizing it years afterward. Rombes wrote that it offered "alienated future rock", and that it "disconnected from tradition". The album was the start of the Ramones' influence on popular music, with examples being genres such as heavy metal, thrash metal, indie pop, grunge, post-punk, and most notably, punk rock. The Rock and Roll Hall of Fame said of their influence on rock in general:

When the [Ramones] hit the street in 1976 with their self-titled first album, the rock scene, in general, had become somewhat bloated and narcissistic. The Ramones got back to basics: simple, speedy, stripped-down rock and roll songs. Voice, guitar, bass, drums. No makeup, no egos, no light shows, no nonsense. And though the subject matter was sometimes dark, emanating from a sullen adolescent basement of the mind, the group also brought cartoonish fun and high-energy excitement back to rock and roll.

Despite the lack of popularity in its era, the significance of the album in the development of the punk rock genre was immense, influencing many of the most well-known names in punk rock, including the Damned, the Clash, Black Flag, Misfits, and Green Day. Billie Joe Armstrong, singer for Green Day, explained his reasoning for listening to the band: "they had songs that just stuck in your head, just like a hammer they banged right into your brain." The album also had a great impact on the English punk scene as well, with the bassist for Generation X, Tony James, saying that the album caused English bands to change their style. "When their album came out," commented James, "all the English groups tripled speed overnight. Two-minute-long songs, very fast." In another interview, James stated that "Everybody went up three gears the day they got that first Ramones album. Punk rock—that rama-lama super fast stuff—is totally down to the Ramones. Bands were just playing in an MC5 groove until then." In 1999, Classic Albums by Collins GEM recognized Ramones as the start of English punk rock and called it the fastest and hardest music that could possibly be concocted, stating: "The songs within were a short, sharp exercise in vicious speed-thrash, driven by ferocious guitars and yet halting in an instant. It was the simple pop dream taken to its minimalist extreme." In 2012 the album was preserved by the National Recording Registry, deeming it "culturally, historically, and aesthetically significant".

=== Cover versions and tributes ===
Each song on Ramones has been covered by various bands. Sonic Youth covered "Beat on the Brat" on their 1987 EP Master-Dik, as did Weird Al Yankovic on the Dr. Demento Covered in Punk LP (2018). In 1991, German punk band Die Toten Hosen played "Blitzkrieg Bop" on their cover album Learning English, Lesson One. A tribute album titled Gabba Gabba Hey: A Tribute to the Ramones was released on August 30, 1991. It contained the songs "Now I Wanna Sniff Some Glue", "53rd & 3rd", "I Don't Wanna Go Down to the Basement", "Loudmouth", and "Beat on the Brat". Screeching Weasel released Ramones (1992), which consisted of the band performing the entire album track list. 1998's Blitzkrieg Over You!: A Tribute to the Ramones featured a cover "Judy Is a Punk" in German, and in 2000, both "Blitzkrieg Bop" and "Beat on the Brat" appeared on Dee Dee Ramone's solo release Greatest & Latest. The compilation album Ramones Maniacs included Youth Gone Mad's version of "Blitzkrieg Bop" (featuring a guest appearance by Dee Dee Ramone) and Yogurt's rendition of "Beat on the Brat". "Blitzkrieg Bop", "Havana Affair", "I Wanna Be Your Boyfriend", and "Now I Wanna Sniff Some Glue" were all covered on The Song Ramones the Same. We're a Happy Family: A Tribute to Ramones (2003) featured several of the album's songs covered by bands like Red Hot Chili Peppers ("Havana Affair"), Rob Zombie ("Blitzkrieg Bop"), Metallica ("53rd & 3rd"), U2 ("Beat on the Brat"), Pete Yorn ("I Wanna Be Your Boyfriend"), and John Frusciante ("Today Your Love, Tomorrow the World"). In 2006, "Blitzkrieg Bop" was reworked into a children's song on the album Brats on the Beat: Ramones for Kids.

== Track listing ==
All tracks originally credited to the Ramones (except "Let's Dance"). Actual writers are listed alongside the tracks.

Side one
No.	Title	Writer(s)	Length
1.	"Blitzkrieg Bop"	Tommy Ramone, Dee Dee Ramone	2:12
2.	"Beat on the Brat"	Joey Ramone	2:30
3.	"Judy Is a Punk"	Joey Ramone	1:30
4.	"I Wanna Be Your Boyfriend"	Tommy Ramone	2:24
5.	"Chain Saw"	Joey Ramone	1:55
6.	"Now I Wanna Sniff Some Glue"	Dee Dee Ramone	1:34
7.	"I Don't Wanna Go Down to the Basement"	Dee Dee Ramone, Johnny Ramone	2:35

Side two
No.	Title	Writer(s)	Length
8.	"Loudmouth"	Dee Dee Ramone, Johnny Ramone	2:14
9.	"Havana Affair"	Dee Dee Ramone, Johnny Ramone	2:00
10.	"Listen to My Heart"	Dee Dee Ramone	1:56
11.	"53rd & 3rd"	Dee Dee Ramone	2:19
12.	"Let's Dance" (Chris Montez cover)	Jim Lee	1:51
13.	"I Don't Wanna Walk Around with You"	Dee Dee Ramone	1:43
14.	"Today Your Love, Tomorrow the World"	Dee Dee Ramone	2:09
Total length:			29:04

2001 expanded edition CD

No.	Title	Writer(s)	Length
15.	"I Wanna Be Your Boyfriend" (demo)	Tommy Ramone	3:02
16.	"Judy Is a Punk" (demo)	Joey Ramone	1:36
17.	"I Don't Care" (demo)	Joey Ramone	1:55
18.	"I Can't Be" (demo)	Ramones	1:56
19.	"Now I Wanna Sniff Some Glue" (demo)	Dee Dee Ramone	1:42
20.	"I Don't Wanna Be Learned/I Don't Wanna Be Tamed" (demo)	Ramones	1:05
21.	"You Should Never Have Opened That Door" (demo)	Dee Dee Ramone, Johnny Ramone	1:54
22.	"Blitzkrieg Bop" (single version)	Tommy Ramone, Dee Dee Ramone	2:12
Total length:			43:06

Notes

- Tracks 15 and 16 produced by Marty Thau at 914 Sound Studios, Blauvelt, New York, September 1975. First issued on The Groups of Wrath: Songs of the Naked City (1991).
- Tracks 17–21 produced by T. Erdelyi and engineered by Jack Malken at Dick Charles Studios, New York, 1975. Tracks 18 and 20 first issued on All the Stuff (And More!) Volume 1 (1990), Sire #26220. Tracks 17, 19 and 21 previously unissued.
- Track 22 produced by Craig Leon. First issued on "Blitzkrieg Bop" single, February 1976.

=== 2016 40th anniversary deluxe edition ===
CD 1

Original album

- Remastered original stereo version (tracks 1–14). Source: original stereo master from Plaza Sound, 1976.
- 40th anniversary mono mix (tracks 15–28). Source: original multi-track tapes transferred to 192/24 digital and original mix notes. Mixed at Abbey Road Studios, London, 2016 by Sam Okell and Craig Leon, assisted by John Bartlett.
- Track listings as per original album.

CD 2

Single mixes, outtakes and demos
No.	Title	Writer(s)	Length
1.	"Blitzkrieg Bop" (original stereo single version)	Tommy Ramone, Dee Dee Ramone	2:12
2.	"Blitzkrieg Bop" (original mono single version)	Tommy Ramone, Dee Dee Ramone	2:11
3.	"I Wanna Be Your Boyfriend" (original stereo single version)	Tommy Ramone	2:25
4.	"I Wanna Be Your Boyfriend" (original mono single version)	Tommy Ramone	2:27
5.	"Today Your Love, Tomorrow the World" (original uncensored vocals)	Dee Dee Ramone	2:12
6.	"I Don't Care" (demo)	Joey Ramone	2:01
7.	"53rd & 3rd" (demo)	Dee Dee Ramone	2:23
8.	"Loudmouth" (demo)	Dee Dee Ramone, Johnny Ramone	2:16
9.	"Chain Saw" (demo)	Joey Ramone	2:01
10.	"You Should Never Have Opened That Door" (demo)	Dee Dee Ramone, Johnny Ramone	1:44
11.	"I Wanna Be Your Boyfriend" (demo)	Tommy Ramone	1:53
12.	"I Can't Be" (demo)	Ramones	2:02
13.	"Today Your Love, Tomorrow the World" (demo)	Dee Dee Ramone	2:13
14.	"I Don't Wanna Walk Around with You" (demo)	Dee Dee Ramone	1:55
15.	"Now I Wanna Sniff Some Glue" (demo)	Dee Dee Ramone	1:45
16.	"I Don't Wanna Be Learned/I Don't Wanna Be Tamed" (demo)	Ramones	1:17
17.	"You're Gonna Kill That Girl" (demo)	Joey Ramone	2:51
18.	"What's Your Name" (demo)	Joey Ramone	2:57
Total length:			39:09

Notes

- Tracks 1 and 2 mixed by Rob Freeman and Craig Leon at Plaza Sound, Radio City Music Hall, New York, 1976.
- Tracks 3 and 4 mixed by Shelly Yakus and Craig Leon at the Record Plant, New York, 1976.
- Track 5 mixed by Sam Okell and Craig Leon at Abbey Road Studios, London, 2016.
- Tracks 6–18 recorded at Dick Charles Studios, New York, 1975. Produced by T. Erdelyi and engineered by Jack Malken. Source: 2-track masters transferred to 192/24 digital.
- Tracks 5, 7–9, 11, 13, 14 and 17 are previously unissued.

CD 3

Live at the Roxy, Hollywood, CA, August 12, 1976

- Contains two full live sets recorded the same evening.

Set 1
No.	Title	Writer(s)	Length
1.	"Loudmouth" (live)	Dee Dee Ramone, Johnny Ramone	2:13
2.	"Beat on the Brat" (live)	Joey Ramone	2:36
3.	"Blitzkrieg Bop" (live)	Tommy Ramone, Dee Dee Ramone	2:13
4.	"I Remember You" (live)	Joey Ramone	2:17
5.	"Glad to See You Go" (live)	Joey Ramone, Dee Dee Ramone	2:03
6.	"Chain Saw" (live)	Joey Ramone	1:51
7.	"53rd & 3rd" (live)	Dee Dee Ramone	2:27
8.	"I Wanna Be Your Boyfriend" (live)	Tommy Ramone	2:22
9.	"Havana Affair" (live)	Dee Dee Ramone, Johnny Ramone	1:55
10.	"Listen to My Heart" (live)	Dee Dee Ramone	1:45
11.	"California Sun" (live)	Glover, Levy	1:58
12.	"Judy Is a Punk" (live)	Joey Ramone	1:23
13.	"I Don't Wanna Walk Around with You" (live)	Dee Dee Ramone	1:31
14.	"Today Your Love, Tomorrow the World" (live)	Dee Dee Ramone	2:09
15.	"Now I Wanna Sniff Some Glue" (live)	Dee Dee Ramone	1:28
16.	"Let's Dance" (live)	Lee	2:09
Total length:			64:40

Set 2

- Track listing for set 2 (tracks 17–32) as per set 1.

Notes

- Recorded by the Record Plant Mobile Unit; produced by Craig Leon and engineered by Gary Ladinsky.
- Tracks 1–16 (set 1) mixed by Shelly Yakus and Craig Leon at the Record Plant, New York, 1976.
- Tracks 17–32 (set 2) mixed by Sam Okell and Craig Leon, assisted by John Bartlett, at Abbey Road Studios, London, 2016. Source: original 16-track tapes transferred to 192/24 digital.

LP

Original album

- 40th anniversary mono mix. Track listing as per original album.

== Personnel ==
Credits taken from Ramones CD booklet, except otherwise noted.

Ramones

- Joey Ramone – lead vocals
- Johnny Ramone – guitar
- Dee Dee Ramone – bass, backing vocals, co-lead vocals on "53rd & 3rd"
- Tommy Ramone – drums, backing vocals, (Note: Tommy Ramone performed backing vocals on at least "Chain Saw".) hand claps

Additional musicians

- Craig Leon – pipe organ on "Let's Dance", additional guitar, (Note: Craig Leon performed additional guitar on at least "I Wanna Be Your Boyfriend".) backing vocals (Note: Craig Leon performed backing vocals on at least "I Wanna Be Your Boyfriend".)
- Mickey Leigh – backing vocals, (Note: Mickey Leigh performed backing vocals on at least "Blitzkrieg Bop", "Judy Is a Punk", "I Wanna Be Your Boyfriend", "Chain Saw" and "I Don't Wanna Walk Around with You".) hand claps
- Rob Freeman – backing vocals (Note: Rob Freeman performed backing vocals on at least "I Wanna Be Your Boyfriend".)
- Arturo Vega – hand claps
- Danny Fields – hand claps

Technical

- Craig Leon – producer, mixing
- Tommy Ramone – associate producer (credited as T. Erdelyi)
- Rob Freeman – engineer, mixing
- Don Hünerberg – assistant engineer
- Greg Calbi – mastering
- Roberta Bayley – photography, cover photo
- Arturo Vega – photography, back cover

== Charts ==
Chart (1976)	Peak position
Swedish Albums (Sverigetopplistan)	46
US Billboard 200	111

Chart (2002)	Peak position
UK Rock & Metal Albums (Official Charts)	33

Chart (2011)	Peak position
Italian Albums (FIMI)	67

Chart (2016)	Peak position
German Albums (Offizielle Top 100)	44
Scottish Albums (Official Charts)	82
Spanish Albums (Promusicae)	76

Chart (2020-2026)	Peak position
Belgian Albums (Ultratop Flanders)	173
Hungarian Physical Albums (MAHASZ)	30

== Certifications ==
Region	Certification	Certified units/sales
United Kingdom (BPI)	Silver	60,000^{‡}
United States (RIAA)	Platinum	1,000,000^{‡}
^{‡} Sales+streaming figures based on certification alone.

== Release history ==
Region	Year	Label	Format	Catalog	Ref
Worldwide release	1976	Sire Records	LP	SR-6020	
Worldwide release	1996	WEA	CD	WPCR-1805	
Worldwide release	1999	WEA	CD	WEA 1805	
Worldwide release	2001	Rhino	CD	RR-7520	
Worldwide release	2001	Rhino	CS	RR 74306	
Worldwide release	2004	Phantom Import Distribution	CD	7599274212	
Worldwide release	2005	Rhino	CD	WPCR75060	
Worldwide release	2006	Sire	CD	7599274212	
UK release	2006	Phantom Import Distribution	LP	EU9103253P	
Worldwide release	2006	WEA	LP	WEA-24323-5	
Worldwide release	2007	WEA	CD	WEA-7506-0	
US release	2008	Wrong Records	CD	RR-9274-21	
Worldwide release	2010	Warner	CD	79796	
Worldwide release	2011	Rhino	LP	8122797667	
Worldwide release	2012	Hi Horse Records	LP	HH 75200	
