= Ramones Maniacs =

2001 Ramones tribute album

Studio album by various artists
- Released: 2001
- Genre: Punk rock
- Label: Trend Is Dead!

Ramones tribute albums chronology
| Blitzkrieg Over You! (1998) | Ramones Maniacs (2001) | We're a Happy Family (2003) |

Ramones Maniacs is a 2001 tribute album to the punk rock band the Ramones, released by Trend Is Dead! Records. The album's track list is an exact match of the band's 1988 compilation album Ramones Mania, which had been released by Sire Records. The album has 26 tracks, played by bands from across the United States, plus one from Australia and one from Canada. Ramones bassist Dee Dee Ramone plays on the track "Blitzkrieg Bop", along with the band of which he was then a member, Youth Gone Mad.

All artwork was created by Tim Bradstreet.

Cited as having the "Greatest Number of God-Awful Band Names" by Mark Prindle of SPIN magazine in 2009.

Almost every song from this album was used, without authorization, for the bootleg series RAMONES: The Tribute Vol. 1-8.

== Track listing ==
1. “I Wanna Be Sedated” by Tiltwheel
2. “Teenage Lobotomy” by Cletus
3. “Do You Remember Rock ‘n’ Roll Radio?" by Bracket
4. “Gimme Gimme Shock Treatment” by Santa’s Dead
5. “Beat On The Brat” by Yogurt
6. “Sheena Is A Punk Rocker” by Love Camp 7
7. “I Wanna Live” by Frantics
8. “Pinhead” by Furious George
9. “Blitzkrieg Bop” by Youth Gone Mad featuring Dee Dee Ramone
10. “Cretin Hop” by Courtney Ono
11. “Rockaway Beach” by Dead End Kids
12. “Commando” by The Young Hasselhoffs
13. “I Wanna Be Your Boyfriend” by The Vapids
14. “Mama’s Boy” by Yanni Rotten
15. “Bop ‘Til You Drop” by Frantics
16. “We’re A Happy Family” by Fallen Star
17. “Bonzo Goes To Bitburg” by Blanks 77
18. “Outsider” by Cletus
19. “Psycho Therapy” by Napkin
20. “Wart Hog” by Santa’s Dead
21. “Animal Boy” by Hammerbrain
22. “Needles & Pins” by The Commercials
23. “Howling At The Moon (Sha-La-La)” by Politically Erect
24. “Somebody Put Something In My Drink” by Spazboy
25. “We Want The Airwaves” by Spazboy
26. “Chinese Rocks” by Green 11’s
27. “I Just Wanna Have Something To Do” by Black Left Pinky
28. “The KKK Took My Baby Away” by Loose Change
29. “Indian Giver” by The Grand Prixx
30. “Rock ‘n’ Roll High School” by The Vice Dolls
