= Youth Gone Mad Featuring Dee Dee Ramone =

Youth Gone Mad featuring Dee Dee Ramone

Studio album by Youth Gone Mad
- Released: December 31, 2002
- Genre: Punk rock
- Label: tREND iS dEAD! records
- Producer: Paul Kostabi

Youth Gone Mad chronology
Oompa Loompa (2000)	Youth Gone Mad featuring Dee Dee Ramone (2002)	Seven (2003)

Youth Gone Mad featuring Dee Dee Ramone is a collaboration studio album by the American punk band the Youth Gone Mad featuring Ramones bassist Dee Dee Ramone. It was released on December 31, 2002. This is known to contain Dee Dee's final studio recordings before his death in June 2002. Originally issued as a 12" picture disc LP by tREND iS dEAD! records, the vinyl featured paintings by Dee Dee and Youth Gone Mad frontman Paul Kostabi on both sides and the insert. The album was remastered and released on compact disc by the same record label in 2003. A standard vinyl LP edition with different artwork was released in Germany by Wanker Records, also in 2003.

"Sheena Is a Surf Punk" was written by Ramone and Kostabi as a follow-up to the classic Ramones hit "Sheena Is A Punk Rocker." "Dee Dee Deceased" was recorded by the remaining members as a tribute to Ramone after he died.

"In the Pines" is a traditional American folk song (although it is credited to Lead Belly in the album insert). "Twist and Shout" is a cover song, originally recorded by The Isley Brothers in 1962. "Blitzkrieg Bop" is a cover song, originally recorded by the Ramones in 1976.

The "Horror Hospital" was the title of a 2002 book by Dee Dee Ramone.

== Track listing ==
1. "Bego Bago"
2. "False Alarm"
3. "I Gotta Right to Love Her"
4. "I Kill You"
5. "You Guys Ready"
6. "Blitzkrieg Bop"
7. "Horror Hospital"
8. "Louse"
9. "Rock n Roll Vacation in L.A."
10. "Sheena Is a Surf Punk"
11. "Stinky Punk"
12. "Twist and Shout"
13. "Yellow"
14. "Dee Dee Deceased"
15. "In the Pines"

== Personnel ==
=== Youth Gone Mad ===
- Paul Kostabi – guitar, vocals, drums, bass, farfisa, melodica
- Dee Dee Ramone – guitar, backing vocals, bass, lead vocals on "False Alarm" and "Horror Hospital"
- Barbara Zampini – bass, guitar
- Tony Mann – drums

=== Additional musicians ===
- Fenton Lawless – guitar, vocals on "Dee Dee Deceased"
- Mike Solis – guitar
- Steve Gabe and Ron Allaire – guitars
