= Furious George =

American punk rock band

Furious George is a punk rock band on Lookout Records and later, Recess Records. Fronted by George Tabb, it also included Evan Cohen (and later, Stevie "Ramone" Burkes) on bass guitar and Michael Harper on drums. Furious George released two full-length albums: Gets a Record in 1997, and V.M. Live in 1999, as well as a series of singles and EPs. George Tabb's band played as the character Richie's (Adrien Brody) punk band in the Spike Lee film Summer of Sam, released in 1999. Dee Dee Ramone and Joey Ramone have provided guest vocals on some of the band's work. Furious George is listed in the Encyclopedia of Punk by Brian Cogan with a foreword by Penelope Spheeris. The band name is a parody to the book character, Curious George.

== Discography ==
- Goes Ape! CD EP (Lookout! Records 163, September 9, 1996)
- Bananas 7" picture disc (Recess Records 042, 1997)
- Gets a Record CD/12" LP (Recess Records 043, 1997)
- V.M.L.ive CD (Liberation Records 37829, July 6, 1999)
  - live at the Fireside Bowl, Chicago, IL May 30, 1998

=== Compilation appearances ===
- It Comes From The East compilation 12" LP/CD (Intensive Scare Records ISLP1, 1996)
  - Eleven bands, plus fanzine insert that includes a page from each band. BLACK VINYL
  - Track 01 – Furious George – Take My Life, Please!
- It Smells Like Spring compilation double LP (Intensive Scare Records ISLP No. 3, 1997)
  - 28 tracks / 1000 made, blue vinyl. + info sheet.
  - Reissued on June 8, 2004
  - International compilation album with 2/3 of the bands being from the US/Canada, the others are from Germany, Japan, Italy, Slovenia, and others.
  - Side 3, Track 05 – Furious George – Sorry Ass Sucker
- Ramones Maniacs tribute CD (tREND iS dEAD! records, 2001)
  - 26 bands, a re-recording of the entire Ramones Mania album.
  - Track 08 – Furious George – Pinhead
