= Fuck 'Em All =

Fuck 'Em All may refer to:

- "Fuck 'Em All", a hip-hop song by Tupac Shakur and Outlawz
- "Fuck 'Em All", an alternative version of "Bless 'Em All", a popular Second World War song, often sung as a protest song by soldiers
- "Fuck 'Em All We've All Ready (Now) Won!", the second studio album by U.S. punk rock band False Alarm
