= Pank =

Pank may refer to:

- Philip Pank (1892–1966), English cricketer
- Siegfried Pank (born 1936), German cellist and viol player
- Thomas Pank

== See also ==
- Lady Pank, a Polish rock band
  - Lady Pank (album), the debut studio album of Lady Pank
- Peter Pank, a 1983 Spanish comic book by Max
- Bank (disambiguation)
- Punk (disambiguation)
