= We're a Happy Family: A Tribute to Ramones =

We're a Happy Family: A Tribute To Ramones

Compilation album by Various Artists
- Released: February 11, 2003
- Recorded: 2000–2002
- Genre: Punk rock
- Length: 49:14
- Label: Columbia
- Producers: Johnny Ramone; Rob Zombie

Ramones tribute albums chronology
Ramones Maniacs (2001)	We're a Happy Family: A Tribute To Ramones (2003)	The Song Ramones the Same (2002)

Professional ratings
Review scores
Source	Rating
AllMusic	2.5/5 stars
Mojo	3/5 stars

We're a Happy Family: A Tribute to Ramones is a 2003 tribute album to the Ramones by various artists. It started when Johnny Ramone was presented with the idea of a tribute album and was asked if he wanted to participate, to which he agreed, as long as he would have full control over the project. He was able to get Rob Zombie as a co-producer, and call upon high-profile bands to participate. Rob Zombie also did the cover artwork, and Stephen King, a Ramones fan, wrote the liner notes.

One of the last things Johnny Ramone did was oversee the album. He advised all the chosen bands to make the songs their own. Ramone liked the Red Hot Chili Peppers' cover of "Havana Affair" so much that he chose to open the album with it.

In addition to the songs on the album, The Ataris' cover of "Rock N' Roll High School" was included as a bonus CD single sold along with the physical album. According to Motorhead's Phil Campbell, they recorded a cover of "Rockaway Beach" for the album, but when Johnny Ramone heard it, he refused to include it.

== Reception ==
We're a Happy Family, wrote Jaan Uhelszki in Mojo, "doesn't send you running to dig out Rocket to Russia in disgust. Instead, it's edifying to see their trademark minimalist sound transmuted in the hands of their most high profile fans.… Kiss get the best-in-show nod for their anthemic 'Do You Remember Rock 'n' Roll Radio?', which sounds ripped right off an early Slade album."

== Track listing ==
1. "Havana Affair" (Ramones, 1976) – Red Hot Chili Peppers
  - The song was later released as a bonus track on the iTunes version of Stadium Arcadium, but as of 2010 has been removed from iTunes entirely. It was, however, later re-released digitally on the iTunes Rock & Roll Hall of Fame Covers EP.
2. "Blitzkrieg Bop" (Ramones, 1976) – Rob Zombie
  - The song later appeared on Rob Zombie's greatest hits album Past, Present & Future.
3. "I Believe in Miracles" (Brain Drain, 1989) – Eddie Vedder & Zeke
4. "53rd & 3rd" (Ramones, 1976) – Metallica
  - Five more Ramones covers from the same sessions were released on different editions of the "St. Anger" single.
5. "Beat on the Brat" (Ramones, 1976) – U2
6. "Do You Remember Rock 'n' Roll Radio?" (End of the Century, 1980) – Kiss
  - The song later appeared on the single-disc edition of Alive IV.
7. "The KKK Took My Baby Away" (Pleasant Dreams, 1981) – Marilyn Manson
8. "I Just Want to Have Something to Do" (Road to Ruin, 1978) – Garbage
  - The song was later released as a B-side to their single "Why Do You Love Me", and as a regional bonus track on their Bleed Like Me album.
9. "Outsider" (Subterranean Jungle, 1983) – Green Day
  - The song originally appeared as a B–side to the "Warning" single, and later on the compilation album Shenanigans.
10. "Something to Believe In" (Animal Boy, 1986) – The Pretenders
11. "Sheena Is a Punk Rocker" (Rocket to Russia, 1977) – Rancid
12. "I Wanna Be Your Boyfriend" (Ramones, 1976) – Pete Yorn
13. "I Wanna Be Sedated" (Road to Ruin, 1978) – The Offspring
  - This song originally appeared on the soundtrack for Idle Hands.
14. "Here Today, Gone Tomorrow" (Rocket to Russia, 1977) – Rooney
  - Johnny Ramone wanted Lisa Marie Presley to record the song for the tribute album. She later recorded it for her album Now What.
15. "Return of Jackie & Judy" (End of the Century, 1980) – Tom Waits
  - The song later appeared on Waits' box set album Orphans: Brawlers, Bawlers & Bastards.
16. "Daytime Dilemma (Dangers of Love)" (Too Tough to Die, 1984) – Eddie Vedder & Zeke
  - This track is not listed on the track list of all editions.
17. Silence – 0:10
18. Silence – 0:10
19. Silence – 0:10
20. "Today Your Love, Tomorrow the World" (Ramones, 1976) – John Frusciante (hidden track). This bonus track is not available on all editions.

== Charts ==
Chart performance for We're a Happy Family: A Tribute to Ramones
Chart (2003)	Peak position
Australian Albums (ARIA)	58
French Albums (SNEP)	83
German Albums (Offizielle Top 100)	74
Norwegian Albums (VG-lista)	30
Swiss Albums (Schweizer Hitparade)	59
