= The Song Ramones the Same =

Compilation album by Various artists
- Released: July 2, 2002
- Genre: Punk rock
- Label: White Jazz

Ramones tribute albums chronology
We're a Happy Family (2002)	The Song Ramones the Same (2002)	Brats on the Beat (2006)

The Song Ramones the Same is a tribute album done by various artists as a tribute to the Ramones. The title is a reference to the multiple works of Led Zeppelin entitled The Song Remains the Same. The album reached #15 on the Swedish albums chart, while the single "I Wanna Be Your Boyfriend" peaked just outside the top 40.

== Track listing ==
1. "Rockaway Beach" - Sahara Hotnights
2. "The KKK Took My Baby Away" - Cool Millions
3. "Blitzkrieg Bop" - Sort Sol
4. "I Remember You" - The Nomads & Kissettes
5. "Havana Affair"- D-A-D
6. "What'd Ya Do" - Hellacopters
7. "I Wanna Be Your Boyfriend" - Per Gessle
8. "Mama's Boy"- Satirnine
9. "I Just Wanna Have Something to Do" - The Dictators
10. "Mental Hell"- Sator
11. "Now I Wanna Sniff Some Glue" - Whale
12. "I'm Not Afraid of Life" - Wolf
13. "Bonzo Goes to Bitburg" - Wayne Kramer
14. "Carbona Not Glue" - Toilet Böys
15. "I Believe In Miracles" - Maryslim
16. "I Can't Make It On Time"- Wilmer X
17. "Return of Jackie & Judy" - Danko Jones
18. "Pet Semetary" - Backyard Babies
19. "Questioningly" - Jesse Malin
