= Blitzkrieg Over You!: A Tribute to the Ramones =

Compilation album by Various Artists
- Released: 1998
- Recorded: 1998
- Genre: Punk rock
- Length: 49:14
- Label: Nasty Vinyl

Ramones tribute albums chronology
Gabba Gabba Hey (1991)	Blitzkrieg Over You!: A Tribute to the Ramones (1998)	Ramones Maniacs (2001)

Blitzkrieg Over You!: A Tribute to the Ramones is a European Ramones tribute album, released in 1998 by Nasty Vinyl, a German record company. Various Ramones songs covered by artists from around the world were included in this release, as well as some originals, the most famous originals being from Motörhead and Nina Hagen. Joey Ramone and Dee Dee Ramone both appear on the album. Many of the tribute songs were recorded in the artists native languages, including German and Finnish, like the German Punk-legends Die Ärzte and Die Toten Hosen.

== Track listing ==
No.	Title	Artist	Original title where different	Original artist	Ramones release
1	Blitzkrieg Bop	Die Toten Hosen, feat. Joey Ramone		Ramones	Ramones (1976)
2	R.A.M.O.N.E.S.	Motörhead		Motörhead	¡Adios Amigos! (1995, Japanese edition)
3	I Remember You	Newtown Neurotics		Ramones	Leave Home (1977)
4	She's The One	Gigantor feat. Leonard G. Phillips		Ramones	Road to Ruin (1978)
5	Teenage Lobotomy	Rasta Knast		Ramones	Rocket to Russia (1977)
6	Dee Dee Took The Subway	Badtown Boys		Badtown Boys	Rocket to Russia (1977)
7	Die Wikingjugend Hat Mein Mädchen Entführt	Die Ärzte	The KKK Took My Baby Away	Ramones	Pleasant Dreams (1981)
8	I'm Against It	Scattergun		Ramones	Road to Ruin (1978)
9	Seppi War A Punk Rocker / Kumm Danz	Sigi Pop	Sheena Is a Punk Rocker	Ramones	Rocket to Russia (1977)
9	Seppi War A Punk Rocker / Kumm Danz	Sigi Pop	Let's Dance	Chris Montez	Ramones (1976)
10	Chainsaw	Shock Treatment	Chain Saw	Ramones	Ramones (1976)
11	Rockaway Beach	Action Pact! feat. Steve Drewett		Ramones	Rocket to Russia (1977)
12	The Crusher	Anfall		Dee Dee King	
13	Judy Ist Ein Punk	Schliessmuskel	Judy Is a Punk	Ramones	Ramones (1976)
14	Lass' Mich In Ruhe	Nina Hagen feat. Dee Dee Ramone		Nina Hagen	
15	Endless Vacation	Patareni		Ramones	Too Tough to Die (1984)
16	Export	Hass	California Sun	Joe Jones	Leave Home (1977)
17	Glad To See You Go	Möped Lads		Ramones	Leave Home (1977)
18	I Wanna See The Ramones	Dirty Scums		Dirty Scums	
19	Beat On The Brat	The Bratbeaters		Ramones	Ramones (1976)
20	Surfin' Bird	Boogeyman		The Trashmen	Rocket to Russia (1977)
21	The KKK Took My Baby Away	Blind Pigs		Ramones	Pleasant Dreams (1981)
22	Lunatic Vibrations	Ramonez '77		Ramonez '77	
23	Siinä On Punk Kari	Ne Luumäet	Sheena Is a Punk Rocker	Ramones	Rocket to Russia (1977)
24	Outsider	The Rhythm Collision		Ramones	Subterranean Jungle (1983)
25	I Wanna Be Sedated	The Adicts		Ramones	Road to Ruin (1978)
26	Müngersdorfer Stadion	Zeltinger	Rockaway Beach	Ramones	Rocket to Russia (1977)
