= Wanker Records =

German punk rock music label

Wanker Records is a Marburg, Hessen-based independent record label, focused on punk rock, which was started by Nick Wanker (founder of the "Pot- Porn- Electro- Punk" Band Frank Fortuna, guitarist for the punk rock bands Fuzzbeer, Fußpils, the Heartbreakers and One Way Down) in 2001.

== Artists ==
Wanker Records have released and worked with artists like Dee Dee Ramone, One Way Down (for which Nick Wanker was also the tour bassist), Terrorgruppe, Embryo Killers (with Gwar and Rich Kids On LSD members), the Willowz, Paleface, Kill Allen Wrench, the New Wave Hookers, the Voodoo Glow Skulls, the Mentors, Crack Up, Michel Solis, Youth Gone Mad, T.S.O.L., NOFX, Frank Fortuna, False Alarm, the Dwarves, Attaque 77, Joey Ramone, White Zombie and many more.

Other albums released by Wanker Records include Vlad Smash! by Vladimir Harkonnen.

== Additional information ==
The prices of the recordings (vinyl and CD) are held low and in regular distances, a label sampler with the name Killer in your Radio appears to which (until June 2007 three releases) always appears with Mark Kostabi artwork Use Your Illusion in alternate reason-colors. The same front cover appeared in the original with the rock band Guns N' Roses.

A 12" MLP released by Dee Dee Ramone the same day the Ramones were inducted into the Rock'n'Roll Hall Of Fame in 2002 with the title Do The Bikini Dance (an exclusive limited vinyl edition of 1499 hand-numbered two-track 12" single (499 in,- wax., and 99 copies in clear wax.) drums and production from contemporary expressionist Paul Kostabi—including a cover version of "Twist & Shout" by the Beatles, presented in individually hand-numbered picture sleeve complete with Dee Dee's own Taking Dope Punk Rock Art music Fanzine. The final studio recordings of Dee Dee Ramone were released on the self-titled album Youth Gone Mad featuring Dee Dee Ramone on Wanker Records in 2003.

== See also ==
- List of record labels
