= The Frantics =

The Frantics or Frantics may refer to:

- The Frantics (instrumental band), an instrumental band from Washington state, a.k.a. "The Four Frantics"
- The Frantics (punk band), a punk rock band
- The Frantics (comedy), a Canadian comedy troupe
- Frantics (video game), a Danish video game nominated for a 2019 Spilprisen
