= Dade County Resistance =

Dade County Resistance is an American, South Carolina power pop/punk rock band, started in 2001 by former members of Guyana Punch Line, Self and Insult To Injury.

Dade County Resistance released a self-titled EP and contributed four tracks to the Twelve Step Program compilation before recording first album.

The debut album Every Last Chance was released by tREND iS dEAD! records and Three Day Hero in 2003. The record was critically acclaimed and the group remained active supporting artists such as Lifetime, Strike Anywhere, Midtown, Stretch Arm Strong, OK Go, Hot Water Music, Dillinger Four, AVAIL and J Church.

DCR's members eventually relocated to different cities and the band took a back seat to other priorities, but the band has continued to get together and write new material. This led to recording the Relative Distance EP in the summer of 2018 at The Jam Room in Columbia, South Carolina. The reunion continued with a release show and an opening slot for the Descendents.

Members of Dade County Resistance have also gone on to join Lakehurst Is Burning and Thank God, among others.
