= Never Mind the Sex Pistols, Here's the Tribute =

Compilation album by Various artists
- Released: August 1, 2000
- Genre: Punk rock
- Label: Radical Records

Professional ratings
Review scores
Source	Rating
AllMusic	2.5/5 stars

Never Mind the Sex Pistols, Here's the Tribute is a tribute album to the punk rock band the Sex Pistols.

== Track listing ==
No.	Title	Artist	Length
1.	"Holidays in the Sun"	The Booked
2.	"Bodies"	Les Stitches
3.	"No Feelings"	The Generators
4.	"Liar"	Submachine
5.	"Problems"	The Krays
6.	"God Save the Queen"	I.C.U.
7.	"Seventeen"	Total Chaos
8.	"Anarchy in the UK"	Blanks 77
9.	"Submission"	The Boils
10.	"Pretty Vacant"	The Ducky Boys
11.	"New York"	Murphy's Law
12.	"E.M.I."	Road Rage
13.	"Belsen Was A Gas"	Lower Class Brats
14.	"I Wanna Be Me"	Malefactors
15.	"Satellite"	Billy Club
16.	"Friggin' in the Riggin'"	Showcase Showdown
17.	"The Great Rock 'n' Roll Swindle"	Niblick Henbane
