= Showcase Showdown (band) =

American punk rock band

The Showcase Showdown
- Origin: Boston, Massachusetts, United States
- Genres: Punk rock, Oi!
- Years active: 1993–2000, 2026-present
- Labels: Tario, Elevator
- Past members: Victoria Arthur; Tom Cloherty; Albert Genna; Steve Maxwell

The Showcase Showdown is an American band that was a fixture in Boston's punk rock scene in the 1990s. The band toured the Northeast extensively and became notorious for their tongue-in-cheek songs, often about obscure cultural icons from political history, television shows and comic books. Its name was among these references, referring to the "Showcase Showdown," a game play element on the game show The Price Is Right.

== Background ==
Showcase Showdown released only two full-length albums, Appetite of Kings and Permanent Stains. They released much of their work on 7" vinyl singles and cassettes, and were featured on several split EPs including a split with Blanks 77 entitled "Drunk at the Karaoke Bar" featuring duets by mostly inebriated members of both bands.

The lineup of the group consisted of Albert "Ping Pong" Genna on vocals, Victoria Arthur on bass, Tom Cloherty on guitar, and Steve "Chez Nips" Maxwell on drums. Arthur was a medical student at the University of Massachusetts Medical School through much of the band's career, and her husband, Cloherty, was working as a social worker. After Showcase Showdown's breakup, Arthur and Cloherty formed the group The Spitzz.

== Reception ==
Allmusic's review of the album Appetite of Kings noted the influence of the Sex Pistols, along with "aggressive pogo-punk". Critic Sarah Bee of Melody Maker, in a favorable review of the album Permanent Stains, wrote, "These men are in touch with their inner deviants."

Critic Ian D'Giff of Newsday wrote that Showcase Showdown's cover version of the Sex Pistols' song "Friggin' in the Riggin'", from the album Never Mind the Sex Pistols... Here's the Tribute, was "raging", and it "nearly makes up for the album's shortcomings".

== Reunion ==
On January 22, 2026, it was announced that Showcase Showdown would be playing a show with Dropkick Murphys on March 13, 2026.

== Discography ==
=== Albums ===
- Appetite of Kings (1996) Elevator Music
- Permanent Stains (1999) Damaged Goods Records

=== Cassettes ===
- Self-titled Tape (1993) Tario Records
- 6 Foot Sofa (1993) Tario Records
- All The Presidents' Heads & Chickens Tape (1994) Tario Records

=== Vinyl ===
- Showcase Showdown 7" (1993) Tario Records
- Chickens 7" (1994) Tario Records
- All The Presidents' Heads 7" (1994) Pogostick Records
- Christmas 7" (1995) Tario Records
- Soothing Moments 7" (1996) Beer City Records
- Split w/ Twerps 8" (1997) 702 Records
- Assemble Your Own Dictator (split w/ August Spies) 7" (1997) Tario Records
- Drunk at the Karaoke Bar (w/ Blanks 77) 7"(1997) Tario Records
- We Are Showcase Showdown 7" Picture Disc (1998) Tario Records

=== Compilation exclusive tracks ===
- "Drano" Runt of the Litter CD (1996) Fan Attic Records
- "Forgery" Suburban Voice No. 38 7" (1996) Suburban Voice
- "The Devil Speaks French/Here Come the Televampires" I've Got My Friends CD (1996) Flat Records
- "Johnny Wont Go To Heaven" Joey Vindictive Presents: That Was Now, This is Then CD (1997) VML Records
- "The Only Thing Scary About Halloween Is Your Fucking Face" Songs for the Witching Season 7" (1998) Creep Records
- "Get Out" Scene Killer Vol.2 CD (1999) Outsider Records
- "Friggin' in the Riggin'" Never Mind the Sex Pistols, Here's the Tribute CD (2000) Radical Records
