= Touching Cloth =

Touching cloth

Studio album by Youth Gone Mad
- Released: 2000
- Genre: Indie, punk
- Label: Empty Records

Youth Gone Mad chronology
Touching cloth (2000)	Oompa Loompa (2000)

Touching cloth is a studio album by the American punk band Youth Gone Mad. It includes songs written and performed with Dee Dee Ramone, formerly of the Ramones.

The song "Guns" was originally written by Youth Gone Mad, but first recorded by Southern California hardcore punk band D.I. Its appearance on Touching cloth marks the first studio recording of "Guns" by Youth Gone Mad, despite having been written two decades earlier. "Amoeba" is a cover song, originally recorded by Adolescents. The version here features vocals by a young Madeline Follin who would go on to form Cults. Follin also sang on the original tune "Go Outter" and a cover of "Killer in Your Radio" (originally by Hammerbrain).

== Track listing ==
All songs by Indrek Kostabi, except where noted

1. "Glad That You're Gone"
2. "Guns"
3. "Inventory"
4. "Lethargy"
5. "No No No"
6. "Mental Patient" (Dee Dee Ramone)
7. "Heidi"
8. "Amoeba" (C. Royer/R. Agnew)
9. "Hop Around" (Dee Dee Ramone)
10. "Go Outter"
11. "Basketball Ballet"
12. "Sedated" (Dee Dee Ramone)
13. "We Are The Fog"
14. "Killer In Your Radio" (Hammerbrain)
15. "Cry Baby" (Dee Dee Ramone)
16. "In My Mind""

== Personnel ==
=== Youth Gone Mad ===
- Ena: guitar and vocals
- Jesse Bates: bass
- D.D. Embex: drums
- Skyles: DX-7 keyboards

=== Additional musicians ===
- Dee Dee Ramone: guitars on tracks 6, 9, 12 & 15
- Madeline McKenna Follin: vocals on tracks 8, 10 and 14
