= Punk =

Punk or punks may refer to:

== Genres, subculture, and related aspects ==
- Punk rock, a music genre originating in the 1970s associated with various subgenres
- Punk subculture, a subculture associated with punk rock, or aspects of the subculture such as:
  - Punk fashion
  - Punk ideologies
  - Punk literature
  - Punk visual art

== People ==
- CM Punk (born 1978), American professional wrestler and retired mixed martial artist
- Punk (gamer) (born 1999), professional Street Fighter video game player

== Media ==
- Punk (magazine), a 1970s American punk music magazine
- The Punk, a 1993 British film, based on the novel of the same name
- P.U.N.K.S., a 1999 American science fiction comedy film
- Punks (film), a 2000 African-American LGBTQ comedy film
- "Punk", a song from the 2001 Gorillaz self-titled debut album
- "Punk", a song from the 2003 Ferry Corsten album Right of Way
- "Punk Guy", a song by NOFX from Punk In Drublic
- "Punk song", a song by NOFX from 45 or 46 Songs That Weren't Good Enough To Go On Our Other Records
- The Encyclopedia of Punk, a 2006 reference work by Brian Cogan
- Punk (Chai album), a 2019 studio recording by Japanese band Chai
- Punk (TV series), a 2019 American documentary television series
- Punk (Young Thug album), a 2021 studio recording by American rapper Young Thug

== Other uses ==
- Punk (fireworks), a smoldering stick used for lighting firework fuse
- Punk, a colloquialism for the cattail reed, genus Typha
- Punk, an evil robot from the Mega Man video game series
- Punk ferox, a marine species in the fossil record, the only member of the mollusc genus Punk

== See also ==
- Donny the Punk (1946–1996), United States prison reform activist
- Punk'd, an MTV hidden-camera television program
