= Learning Is Impossible =

Studio album by False Alarm
- Released: 1998
- Recorded: 1998 (1–6), 1983 (7)
- Genre: Punk rock
- Length: 11:41
- Label: (United States) False Alarm Records
- Producers: False Alarm & Lynne Leighting (6)

False Alarm chronology
Learning Is Impossible (1998)	Fuck ‘Em All We've All Ready (Now) Won! (2006)

Learning Is Impossible is the first studio album by the American punk rock band False Alarm, which was released in 1998.

== Track listing ==
1. "Learning Is Impossible" — 1:23
2. "I Hate Everyone" — 1:37
3. "Even Though" — 1:57
4. "Can't Get Into a Bar" — 1:17
5. "Government Has a War" — 2:01
6. "Skitzo-Free-N-Yeah" — 2:09
7. "Self-Destruct" — 1:13

== Personnel ==
False Alarm

- Paul Aragon — lead vocals
- Floyd Aragon — guitar
- Dylan Maunder — guitar
- Brent Alden — bass
- Art Chianello — drums

with:

- Fat Mike — lead vocals (7)
- Justin Time — drums (7)
