= Sonny Vincent =

American rock musician (born 1952)

Sonny Vincent (born July 7, 1952) is an American rock musician. He has been active in music since the '60s—in particular the mid-1970s, when he was part of the New York City punk rock scene with his original band, Testors. Vincent is currently active in music, film, multi-media art, and writing. His pedigree includes mid-70s Testors' performances at C.B.G.B. and Max's Kansas City. Always active in his own bands, Vincent also spent time touring and recording for 9 years as Maureen "Moe" Tucker and Sterling Morrison's guitar player (both of the Velvet Underground.) Members of Vincent's bands include a vast range of players/characters, from the drummer of the Stooges, Scott Asheton, to Charles Manson's one-time guitar player, Ernie Knapp.

== Early life and career ==
Sonny Vincent was born in New York City and had difficult relationships with his foster parents, teachers, and other adult authority figures. His earliest bands were formed in the mid and late 60s. Most notably 'Distance','Fury' and 'Liquid Diamonds'.These earliest bands were formative later recognized as 'Hard Rock' and 'Proto Punk' The first official recordings were with 'Liquid Diamonds' recorded in the Vietnam era in 1969 when he was home on leave from Paris Island while in the USMC. The- 'Distance','Fury','Liquid Diamonds' recordings have since come out on Vinyl and Digital on Hozac Records though their 'Archival' branch of releases.

Vincent formed Testors in 1975 with Gene Sinigalliano (guitar) and Gregory R (drums). Later line-ups included Surrealist Ron Pieniak (Rex Pharaoh) on bass, Jeff Couganour (Jeff West) on drums, and Kenneth Huebner (Kenneth Brighton) on bass. Testors played New York clubs such as Max's Kansas City, and CBGB and Philadelphia's Hot Club with groups such as: Mink DeVille, Teenage Jesus and the Jerks, The Cramps, and Suicide. They also toured nationwide with the Dead Boys. Testors released a 7-inch single in 1980, "Together" b/w "Time Is Mine."

In 1981, Testors disbanded and Vincent moved to Minneapolis. In 1982, he formed Sonny Vincent and The Extreme with Michael (now Hannah) Phillips (guitar), Jeff Rogers (drums) and Mort Bauman (bass guitar). The group toured the U.S. and released another single, "SVE", with the songs, "Wingdale," "Top Dog," and "Phantom". In 1983, while still living in Minneapolis/St. Paul, Vincent became involved with film-making and multimedia arts. The group made a film titled Mannequin World on the streets of Minneapolis. In 1984–1985, Vincent was involved in a performance art project that saw him banned from the grounds of the Minneapolis College of Art and Design.

After the Extreme disbanded, Vincent went on to form other groups, such as Model Prisoners 1987-1989 (with a line-up including, Bob Stinson from the Replacements, Mike Henderson, and Jim Michels) and Shotgun Rationale 1989–1990, which had a revolving line-up that included, Mort Bauman, Mike Henderson, Stinson, Cheetah Chrome of the Dead Boys, and Greg Norton of Hüsker Dü.

During the early 1990s, Vincent and drummer Jeff Rogers relocated from Minneapolis to Los Angeles where they formed a band for a short time with Ernie Knapp on bass.

== Late career ==
In the early 1990s, Vincent moved to the Netherlands. He formed a group, The Dons, with two Dutch musicians. Other line-ups during this period were Sonny Vincent and His Rat Race Choir, which included Scott Asheton, Cheetah Chrome, and Captain Sensible.

In addition to releasing over 20 albums under his own name, Vincent toured and recorded for nine years with Maureen "Moe" Tucker of The Velvet Underground. During this time, although Vincent continued to record his own albums and tour his own show, he dedicated many years to Tucker. He recorded several albums with her and did many tours across the United States and Europe as her guitar player. Although the line-ups Tucker used often changed, Vincent and John Sluggett were permanent members. Having two original members of the Velvet Underground (Tucker and Morrison) and members of Testors (Vincent) and Half Japanese (Sluggett) brought new life to the band. Victor DeLorenzo of the Violent Femmes also briefly joined the band.

After touring with Moe Tucker became less frequent, Vincent recorded a new album, Pure Filth, with drummer Scott Asheton of the Stooges and Captain Sensible of the Damned. After this release Vincent and Asheton, along with Steve Baise of the Devil Dogs, toured the United States and Europe playing songs from the album and from Vincent's catalog.

Vincent has continued touring and playing his music for audiences in Europe and the United States.

In 2012 Vincent formed Sonny Vincent and the Bad Reactions. The band toured the United States during the summer and recorded three songs, released by tREND iS dEAD! records on 7-inch vinyl. 2012 also saw Hozac records initiate the "Archive" branch of its label. The first release in this category was by Vincent's "Proto-Punk" band, Fury, recorded in 1972. In January 2020 Hozac records released a full-length LP compiling unreleased tracks from three of Vincent's pre-Testors bands, Distance (1969–71), Fury (1972), and Liquid Diamonds (1973–75), as well as one of the earliest Testors demos from 1976.

== Discography ==
Below is a partial listing of releases by Sonny Vincent. Vocals and guitar by Sonny Vincent and in all cases the words and music are written by him.

- Note - excepting in two cases where the release is listed as 'split' with another artist.
- 1980 Testors - Time is Mine/Together - 7-inch Drive In Music (USA)
- 1982 Sonny Vincent and The Extreme - SVE - 7-inch Flexi-EP
- 1985 Model Prisoners - Lesson In Life - 7-inch - Charm Records (USA)
- 1989 Shotgun Rationale - Who Do They Think They Are - LP Nomad Communications (UK)/EFA Producer: Maureen Tucker (Velvet Underground)
- 1991 Shotgun Rationale - s/t - 7-inch EP - Dog Meat Records (Australia)
- 1992 Shotgun Rationale - Beyond Rebellion - CD - D.D.R. Records (Germany)/RTD
- 1992 Sonny Vincent - Recordings 1979-91 - LP - Vince Lombardy Highschool Records (Germany)/EFA
- 1993 Shotgun Rationale - Roller Coaster - LP/CD - Vince Lombardy Highschool Records (Germany)/EFA;
- 1994 The Dons - Gunsmoke - 7-inch - Vince Lombardy Highschool Records (Germany)
- 1994 The Dons - Naked - CD - Voices Music (Germany)
- 1995 Shotgun Rationale - Cocked - CD - Subway Records (Germany)
- 1995 Sonny Vincent - Original Punk Rock Recordings, New York, 1976-77 - 10-inch - Incognito Records (Germany)
- 1997 Sonny Vincent - Good Dogs Die Young - CD - Noiseworks Records (Germany)
- 1997 Sonny Vincent and his Rat Race Choir - Pure Filth - CD - Overdose Records (Switzerland)
- 1997 Sonny Vincent - 7-inch - Flight 13 Records (Germany)
- 1997 Sonny Vincent - Electric K.O. Live In France - 7-inch EP - Nest Of Vipers Records (France)
- 1998 Sonny Vincent - Lucky Seven Inch Record - 7-inch EP - Incognito Records (Germany)
- 1998 Sonny Vincent and his Rat Race Choir - Pure Filth - 10-inch - Safety Pin Records (Spain)
- 1998 Sonny Vincent - Hard In Detroit - LP - Nest Of Vipers (France)
- 1998 Sonny Vincent - Parallax In Wonderland - CD - empty Records (Germany)
- 1998 Sonny Vincent/Else Admire - Breadless Art - Split 7-inch - Incognito Records (Germany)
- 1998 Sonny Vincent - Songs To Kick Your Ass By - 7-inch EP - Nest Of Vipers (France)
- 2000 Sonny Vincent - Parallax In Wonderland - CD - Devil Doll Records (US release)
- 2000 Sonny Vincent - Parallax In Wonderland - LP (European vinyl only release) - Munster Records (Spain)
- 2000 Sonny Vincent - Original Punk Rock Recordings, New York, 1976-77 Part Two, 10-inch - Incognito Records (Germany)
- 2000 Sonny Vincent – Resistor – 7-inch - NDN Records (Texas, USA)
- 2000 Testors featuring Sonny Vincent – New York City Punk Rock 1979 – LP (vinyl) - Rave Up Records (Italy)
- 2000 Sonny Vincent and The Safety Pins – Power Ride – EP - Munster Records (Spain)
- 2001 Sonny Vincent – Hell's Kitchen – CD/LP - Munster Records (Spain)
- 2003 Sonny Vincent (With Ex-Safety Pins) / STEVIE & THE SECRETS Split 10-inch Vinyl Record- Munster Records (Spain)
- 2003 Sonny Vincent – The Good, the Bad, the Ugly – CD/LP - Empty Records (Germany), Munster Records (Spain), Acetate Records (USA)
- 2003 Testors featuring Sonny Vincent – Complete Recordings 1976-79 – 2CD/doubleLP - Swami Records (USA)
- 2003 Sonny Vincent/Jimmy Page – A Good Day for Rock/Wailing Sounds – saw-blade shaped 7-inch- Empty Records (Germany)
- 2003 Sonny Vincent – My Guitar b/w Funny Now (she blew it) – 7-inch - Flapping Jet Records (USA)
- 2005 Sonny Vincent – Soul Mates – CD - Disturbed/Cargo Records (Germany)
- 2006 Sonny Vincent – P.I.N.S. – 2CD - NDN Records (USA)
- 2007 Sonny Vincent – Switchblade Summer – CD - Nest Of Vipers Records (France)
- 2008 Sonny Vincent - Testors Live – Vinyl LP - Incognito Records (Germany)
- 2009 Sonny Vincent – Semper Fidelis – LP - Rockin' Bones Records (Italy) 3-LP set
- 2009 Sonny Vincent – Semper Fidelis – CD - PukeandvomitRecords (USA)
- 2009 Sonny Vincent – Sonny Vincent With Members Of Rocket From The Crypt–CD+LP-We Deliver The Guts/Cargo Records(Germany)
- 2010 Model Prisoners Featuring:Sonny Vincent And Bob Stinson – Cow Milking Music – LP incl CD-Disturbed Records Distro Cargo
- 2010 Sonny Vincent – Sonny Vincent With Members Of Rocket From The Crypt – Complete Studio Recordings And Exclusive Live Performances–CD-We Deliver The Guts/Cargo Records(Germany)
- 2010 Testors – Two Sides Of Death – Vinyl 7-inch 45 record - Windian Records (USA) *Two exclusive tracks
- 2011 Testors - Live Recordings 1976-'79 - LP - Yeah Right! (Canada)
- 2011 Sonny Vincent – Bizarro Hymns – LP and CD package - Still Unbeatable Records (Germany)
- 2012 Testors – Time Is Mine" "Together" (This) Time Is Mine" – Vinyl 7-inch 45 record - Windian Records (USA) *one exclusive bonus track.
- 2012 Sonny Vincent and The Bad Reactions – Sonny Vincent and The Bad Reactions – 7-inch - tREND iS dEAD! records (USA)
- 2012 FURY – FLYING "100 Proof" – Vinyl 7-inch 45 record - HOZAC Records (USA)
- 2013 Totally F**ked Vinyl 7-inch 45 record - ‘Opps Baby’ records- (USA)
- 2013 Sonny Vincent James Brown's Evil Son – Vinyl 7-inch 45 BOXED HAND PAINTED - OX Fanzine release/Joachim Hiller(Germany)
- 2013 Sonny Vincent ULTRAMAFIC – Vinyl LP RECYCLED AND RESTORED VINTAGE COVERS/Handpainted - NB Records/Stefan Lorchner (Germany)
- 2013 Sonny Vincent – A Testament To The Spirit Of Music – CD and Fanzine - Episode Sounds (Japan)
- 2014 Sonny Vincent – Cyanide Consomme – VINYL LP and CD - Big Neck Records (USA)
- 2014 TESTORS/Sonny Vincent – Complete Recordings 1976-1979 – re-release- Double VINYL and Double CD - Alien Snatch Records (Germany)
- 2014 Sonny Vincent and Spite – Spiteful featuring Rat Scabies, Glen Matlock and Steve Mackay – released on vinyl and CD formats - Ultramafic Records USA and Still Unbeatable Records Germany
- 2015 Sonny Vincent and Rocket From the Crypt - Vintage Piss - Swami Records (USA)
- 2020 'Diamond Distance & Liquid Fury- Sonny Vincent: Primitive 1969-76- Hozac Records Archival Releases
- 2021 Sonny Vincent - Snake Pit Therapy - Svart Records (Finland)
- 2023 Sonny Vincent: Primitive 1969-76-Ripple Records (USA)

2023 Re-release and Re-master Sonny Vincent-Parallax In Wonderland-Featuring Scott Asheton,Captain Sensible,Ron Asheton,Jimmy Warwas,Blacky-Deadbeat Records.

____________ Below is a listing of the Moe Tucker albums Sonny played guitar on-

With Maureen Tucker of the Velvet Underground:

- 1991 I Spent A Week There The Other Night - LP - New Rose Records (France)
- 1991 Fired Up - 10 inch single - New Rose (France)
- 1992 Oh No They're Recording This Show - Live Album
- 1994 Dogs Under Stress - LP/CD - Sky/Ichiban Records (USA)

Compilations featuring Sonny Vincent songs:

- Found In The Subway and People's Republic Of Rock'n'Roll - Subway Records, Germany
- Unexpected Flying Objects - Flying Revolverblatt Anniversary 10-inch, Germany
- 1998 Moderne Menschen Kaufen Modern – CD - Noiseworks Records / The Orchard
- 2000 A Fistful of Rock'n'Roll Vol. 6 - CD - Tee Pee Records
- 2000 Munster Records Goes HiFi - CD - Munster Records (Spain)
- 2001 Again... This one's for Johnny - CD - Munster Records (Spain)
- 2003 Swami Sound System Vol. 1: 2003 Sales Conference – CD - Swami Records (USA)
- 2005 A Tribute to Mr. Rock -Chuck Berry Tribute Album- 'Carol' performed by Sonny Vincent - Vinyl 12-inch LP - Bronco Records (Spain)
- 2005 TODOS SOMOS RAMONES -RAMONES TRIBUTE ALBUM- Sonny performs- 'I Just Want To Have Something To Do' -CD- rwyrcds (ARGENTINA)
- 2007 Greetings From Los Angeles - Eight Years of Acetate Records - CD - Acetate Records (USA)
- 2007 Sick Of Being Sick Vol. 1 Sonny's song 'Aztec Runaway' Appears on this Vinyl 12-inch LP on Primitive Records (Italy)
