= Brats on the Beat: Ramones for Kids =

Compilation album by Various artists
- Released: 2006
- Genre: Punk rock
- Label: Go-Kart
- Producer: Jennifer Finch

Ramones tribute albums chronology
The Song Ramones the Same (2002)	Brats on the Beat: Ramones for Kids (2006)

Brats on the Beat: Ramones for Kids is a 2006 Ramones cover album, featuring 'kiddified' covers of classic Ramones songs. Songs are performed by members of various punk rock bands. The album was created in order to offer adults an alternative way to introduce children to music, specifically punk rock, through kid friendly Ramones songs that adults can also enjoy.

== Track listing ==
1. "Blitzkrieg Bop" – featuring Jim Lindberg of Pennywise
2. "Rock 'n' Roll High School" – featuring Matt Skiba of Alkaline Trio
3. "California Sun" – featuring Brett Anderson of The Donnas
4. "Do You Remember Rock 'n' Roll Radio?" – featuring Greg Attonito of the Bouncing Souls
5. "Suzy Is a Headbanger" – featuring Nick Oliveri of Mondo Generator and Queens of the Stone Age
6. "Rockaway Beach" – featuring Blag Dahlia of The Dwarves
7. "I Just Want to Have Something to Do" – featuring Emily Wynne-Hughes of Go Betty Go
8. "Spider-Man theme song" – featuring Ash Guff of Guff
9. "We Want the Airwaves" – featuring Spooney of the Gabba Gabba Heys
10. "Sheena Is a Punk Rocker" – featuring Josie Cotton
11. "Cretin Hop" – featuring Tony Reflex of the Adolescents
12. "Bop 'Til You Drop" – featuring Jack Grisham of T.S.O.L.

== Reception ==
Spin Magazine said the album was one of "the best tributes to the young and restless", and pointed out that "infamously violent punkers like Blag Dahlia, Jack Grisham and Nick Oliveri sing lead on sugarcoated covers, accompanied by giggling children". AllMusic said of the album, that "it's all rather cutesy, but done tastefully enough that it's easy to see how much the older contributors love the Ramones and simply want to spread it around to the younger generations ... the songs here come across way more sunny and enthusiastic than the real Ramones -- this is the perfect disc for parents who want to rock out with their kids, but whose little ones might not yet take to actual Ramones recordings".

New York Magazine said the album was "an impressive collection of punk-rock veterans, plus a kiddie chorus that belt out Ramones classics", and also noted that it was a benefit project for St. Judes Children's Research Hospital. Rob Williams of the Winnipeg Free Press said "it could be argued the original recordings by bubble-gum punks the Ramones are kid-friendly enough, but Brats on the Beat takes the sugar-fix fun of the New York legends and adds gang-vocals by a gaggle of children to make classics like 'Blitzkrieg Bop', 'Rockaway Beach', 'Sheena is a Punk Rocker' and 'Cretin Hop' even more perfectly suited for the under three-foot crowd". Linda Laban of the Boston Globe opined that "it's playtime, not nap time ... whether it's sleepy time or crazy time, this rock album has tots covered".
