= Smells Like Bleach: A Punk Tribute to Nirvana =

Compilation album by various artists
- Released: January 2001
- Genre: Punk rock, hardcore punk
- Length: 41:06
- Label: Cleopatra

Alternative cover
- Digipak version

Smells Like Bleach: A Punk Tribute to Nirvana is a tribute album by various artists to the American grunge band Nirvana, released in 2001.

The album's title came from the amalgamation of Nirvana's signature song "Smells Like Teen Spirit" and their debut album Bleach. It contains twelve Nirvana songs from different releases, mainly Nirvana's second studio album, Nevermind (which contained seven of the 12 songs covered herein), and despite the title only a single song ("Negative Creep") comes from Bleach.

== Track listing ==
All tracks are written by Kurt Cobain, except where noted.

No.	Title	Artist	Length
1.	"Come as You Are"	The Vibrators	3:50
2.	"Smells Like Teen Spirit" (Cobain, Krist Novoselic, Dave Grohl)	Blanks 77	3:33
3.	"Stay Away"	UK Subs	2:49
4.	"On a Plain"	Agent Orange	2:23
5.	"Breed"	Total Chaos	2:56
6.	"Negative Creep"	Dee Dee Ramone	2:53
7.	"Lithium"	Vice Squad	4:11
8.	"Something in the Way"	Burning Brides	2:57
9.	"Scentless Apprentice" (Cobain, Novoselic, Grohl)	Flipper	4:10
10.	"All Apologies"	D.O.A.	3:07
11.	"Aneurysm" (Cobain, Novoselic, Grohl)	Dr. Know	4:34
12.	"Dive" (Cobain, Novoselic)	Inner City Unit	3:39

== Song information ==
- Tracks 1–5, 7–8 were originally performed on the album Nevermind.
- Track 6 was originally performed on the album Bleach.
- Tracks 9–10 were originally performed on the album In Utero.
- Track 11 was originally performed on the album Incesticide.
- Track 12 was originally performed on the "Sliver" single.

== Liner notes ==
The liner notes to Smells Like Bleach were written by Dave Thompson. In it, he describes Smells Like Bleach as Nirvana's "first ever tribute album." In actual fact, the tribute album Smells Like Nirvana: A Tribute to Nirvana was released before Smells Like Bleach (June 6, 2000).

In the seventh paragraph, Thompson writes that "if the Hall of Fame has not collapsed beneath the weight of its own oxymoronic irrelevance by then, watch for Krist Novoselic and Dave Grohl to be invited out to Cleveland sometime around the year 2017."

Artists become eligible for induction into the performers category of the Rock and Roll Hall of Fame twenty-five years after the releases of their first records. Thompson was postulating that Nirvana would be inducted in 2017 because 2017 marks the twenty-fifth anniversary of Nirvana's second studio album, Nevermind, reaching number one on the Billboard charts (January 11, 1992). But, since their first studio album, "Bleach", was released June 15, 1989, the first year Nirvana was actually eligible for induction into the Hall of Fame was 2014. As it so turns out, Nirvana was indeed inducted into the Hall of Fame in their first year of eligibility (April 10, 2014), and the induction ceremony was held Brooklyn, New York, at the Barclays Center, not Cleveland.
