= Mandy Stein =

American film producer and director (born 1975)

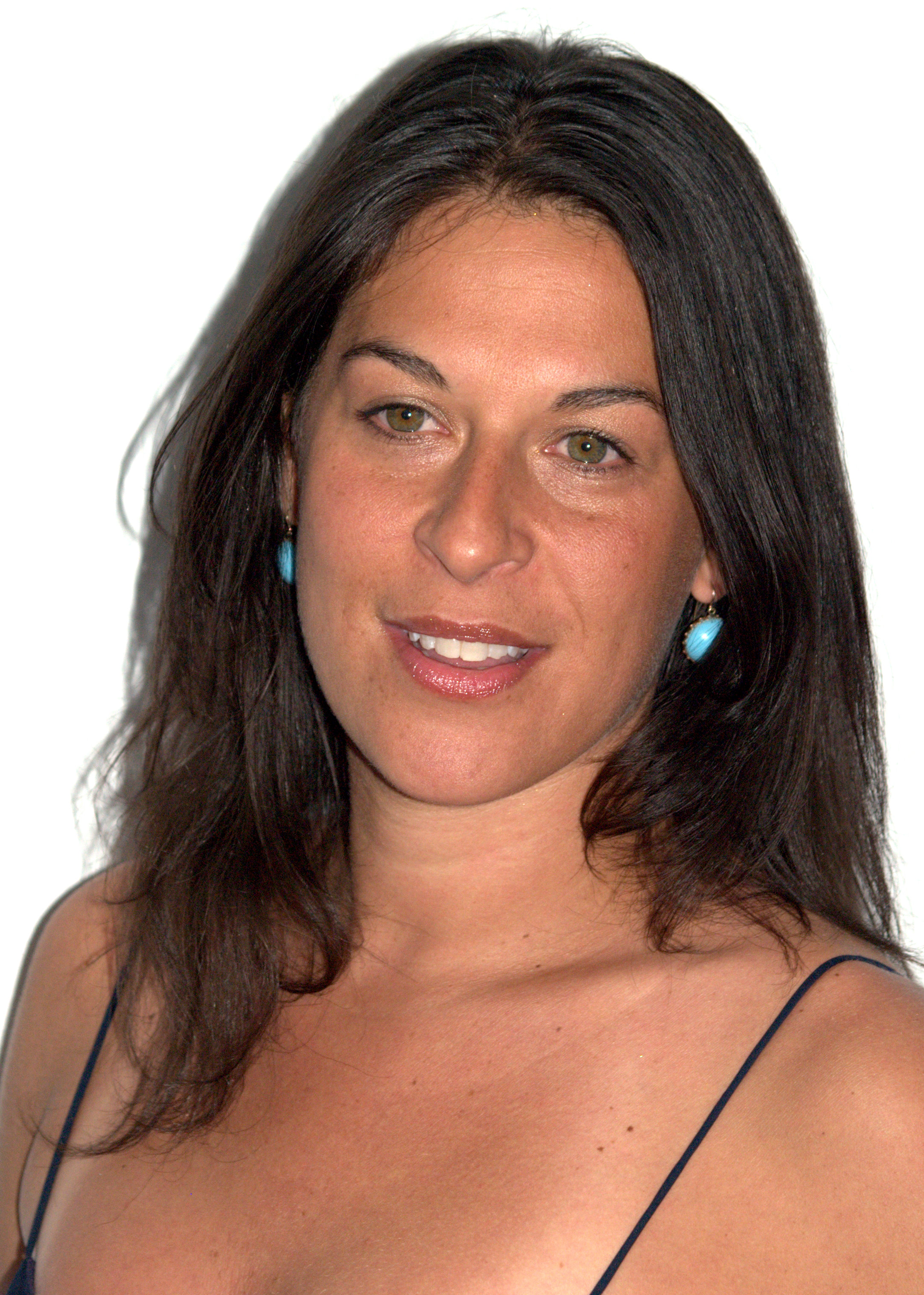
- Stein at the 2009 Tribeca Film Festival
- Born: January 14, 1975 (age 50); Manhattan, New York, U.S.
- Occupations: Film director; producer
- Years active: 2000s–present
- Parents: Seymour Stein (father); Linda S. Stein (mother)

Mandy Stein (born January 14, 1975) is an American film producer and film director.

Stein was born in Manhattan to Seymour Stein and Linda S. Stein. She graduated from Kent School in 1994 and attended Occidental College. She started her first project You See Me Laughin' while a student at Occidental College and took five years to complete.

== Filmography ==
Year	Film	Director	Producer	Writer	Other	Notes
2012	Bad Brains: A Band in DC	Yes				
2009	Burning Down the House: The Story of CBGB	Yes	Yes			
2002	You See Me Laughin'	Yes				
