= Fuck 'Em All We've All Ready (Now) Won! =

Studio album by False Alarm
- Released: 2006; Re-released: 2009
- Recorded: 2001–2002
- Studio: Painted Sound Studios; Los Angeles, United States
- Genre: Punk rock
- Length: 42:20
- Label: (United States) False Alarm Records (Europe) (Italy) Nicotine Records
- Producer: Brent Alden, Paul Kostabi

False Alarm chronology
Learning Is Impossible (1998)	Fuck 'Em All We've All Ready (Now) Won! (2006)

Fuck 'Em All We've All Ready (Now) Won! is the second studio album by the American punk rock band False Alarm. It was recorded in 2001–2002 at Painted Sound Studios in Los Angeles, but released only in 2006 and re-released in Italy by Nicotine Records in 2009.

== Track listing ==
All tracks composed by Brent Alden and Dylan Maunder; except where noted.

1. "Horrible Life" — 2:22
2. "Vietnamese Baby" (David Johansen) — 3:38
3. "Enemies" — 0:55
4. "Youth Gone Mad" — 3:11
5. "Tell Me Who I Am" — 3:08
6. "No Choice" — 4:54
7. "My Destruction" — 3:14
8. "In My Mind" (Paul Kostabi) — 4:01
9. "Devil Devil" — 3:02
10. "I Could Care Less" — 3:30
11. "High Tension Wire" (Stiv Bators, Cheetah Chrome, Jimmy Zero) — 3:06
12. "Day Is Night Brent" (Brent Alden, Dylan Maunder, George Tabb) — 2:08
13. "Can’t See the Sun" — 2:10
14. "I Don’t Want to Be Your Friend" — 2:59

== Release history ==
Region	Date	Label	Format	Catalog
United States	2006	False Alarm Records	CD	—
Italy	2009	Nicotine Records	CD	NIC060

== Personnel ==
False Alarm

- Dylan Maunder — lead guitar, lead vocals
- Art Chianello — drums
- Paul Kostabi — rhythm guitar
- Brent Alden — bass

Additional personnel

- Cheetah Chrome — lead guitar (4–6, 9–11); lead vocals (11)
- Rick Wilder — lead vocals (2)
- De De Troit — lead vocals (8)

Technical

- Steven Bardo — engineer
- Dee Dee Ramone and Paul Kostabi — artwork

== Reviews ==
- PunkBands.com
- PunkGlobe.com
- Ramones.ru (Russian)
- SugarBuzzMagazine.com
- Slums Off Hollywood Boulevard
- Summer of Hate Punk Rock Zine
