= The Willowz =

American garage punk band

- Origin: Anaheim, California
- Genres: Garage rock
- Years active: 2002–present
- Labels: Wanker Records, Posh Boy Records, Artmonkey Records, Dionysus Records, Sympathy for the Record Industry, Acid Bird Records, LeGrand Bag Records, Dim Mak Records
- Members: Richie James Follin; Jessica Reynoza; Loren (Ted) Humphrey
- Past members: Aric Bohn; Alex Nowicki; Daniel Bush; Will McLaren
- Website: thewillowz.com

The Willowz are an American garage punk rock band from Anaheim, California. The band was formed in 2002 when Richie James Follin (guitar and lead vocals) and Jessica Reynoza (bass and vocals) were both 18 years old and attending the same college. They have toured the world and released four studio albums. Their influences range from rock n’ roll to folk to punk rock to soul to power pop to garage rock.

== History ==
Their first release was a 7-inch on the legendary punk rock label Posh Boy Records in 2002. They followed it up with a full-length self-titled record on Dionysus records in 2003 produced by Paul Kostabi and Richie James Follin. The album blends energetic, brash punk rock with soulful garage rock.

Their debut album caught the ear of the iconic French film maker Michel Gondry, who placed their song “Something” in his Oscar-winning film Eternal Sunshine of the Spotless Mind as Kirsten Dunst dances in her underwear with Mark Ruffalo, as well as "Keep On Looking". Gondry put another song on the soundtrack that did not appear in the film, entitled “I Wonder”. At Gondry's expense, he flew the band out to New York to shoot the video for the song, which he also directed. Shortly following the release of the video, Gondry introduced The Willowz's music to Ben Beardsworth, the head of A&R at XL Records. XL flew the band out for a tour of the United Kingdom and released a 7-inch for “I Wonder” and “Meet Your Demise” on Rex Records (an XL Records subsidiary).

The Willowz released their second album, Talk In Circles, in 2005 on Sympathy for the Record Industry. The album was a massive undertaking of 20 songs recorded in Follin’s studio garage in Anaheim. The album features a wide array of music styles. It extends on the energetic garage rock sounds of the first album while blending a more labored-over dream punk sound. This album saw Paul Kostabi and Richie James Follin teaming up again to produce. They introduced more instruments into the band’s sound, including a prominently featured Fender Rhodes piano, organ, horns, and woodwinds. It also contains audio samples of animals, church bells, and public chatter. The band said they were trying to make their own little suburban Pet Sounds. Sympathy also at the same time re-released their debut album with a few extra songs and re-titled it Are Coming. Talk In Circles was met with critical acclaim. Rolling Stone named it one of the “best albums of 2005". The song “Equation #6” was featured in The Science of Sleep, another Michel Gondry film and soundtrack. Gondry said he wants “to be the Warhol to their Velvet Underground”. The band released an accompanying DVD of 20 music videos for Talk In Circles entitled See In Squares. The band was featured in a documentary about the founder of Sympathy for the Record Industry entitled The Treasures of Long Gone John.

The band released their third album, Chautauqua, in 2007 on Steve Aoki’s Dim Mak Records. It was recorded in Piermont, New York at Paul Kostabi’s Thunderdome studios. The album introduced a much heavier guitar sound for the band. It is much more riff oriented and the songs are generally medium tempo. Spin magazine described “Evil Son” (the first single off the album) as “enlivened with lush orchestral arrangements and a pregnant guitar solo straight out of a 1960s acid trip.” Spin also went on to say, “Other tracks such as 'Jubilee' evoke blues, folk and even country influences, showcasing the Willowz’ carefully honed stylistic prowess." Michel Gondry's son, Paul Gondry, directed a music video for the song on the album entitled "Take A Look Around", collaborating with artists Valerie Pirson, Will Robertson, Owen Levelle, Shoko Komori, Ivan Abel, Christi Bertelsen, Yota Bertrang, and Paul Barman.

The Willowz released their fourth album, Everyone, in 2009 on Dim Mak. The band went to Dallas, Texas to record with producer Stuart Sikes. The record focuses on a more power pop sound and sees the band getting back to their garage rock roots. A Tiny Mix Tapes review states, “Unlike their three previous full-length efforts, Everyone sees The Willowz complete their transformation from just-fucking-around California punks into a well-oiled, hit-producing machine." The title track was featured in an HBO Spring 2011 commercial spot entitled “Here We Come” (a lyric from the song) for their upcoming season of shows. Another song from the album, “Repetition”, was featured in a Mountain Dew Kickstart commercial that aired during the Super Bowl and a Mead notebook commercial. The band was featured in the Netflix Steve Aoki documentary I'll Sleep When I'm Dead.

The band’s fifth studio album, entitled Fifth, was release September 2017 on Thrill Me Records.

== Band members ==
- Richie James Follin (lead vocals, guitar)
- Aric Bohn (guitar, vocals)
- Jessica Reynoza (bass, vocals)
- Loren (Ted) Humphrey (drums)
- Alex Nowicki (drums)
- Daniel Bush (guitar)

== Discography ==
=== Studio albums ===
- The Willowz (2004) Dionysus Records
- Are Coming (2004) Sympathy for the Record Industry
- Talk In Circles (2005) Sympathy for the Record Industry
- Chautauqua (2007) Dim Mak Records
- Unveil (2007) LeGrand Bag Records
- Everyone (2009) Dim Mak Records
- Fifth (2017) Thrill Me Records

=== Live albums ===
- Willowz With A Z (2003) Artmonkey Records

=== Singles ===
- The Willowz (5"MCD on Wanker Records, Germany 2002)
- The Willowz (2003) (7-inch "That Willowz Feelin'" b/w "Think Again") Posh Boy Records
- "Scarling" (split 7-inch, Sympathy for the Record Industry (2005)
- "Equation No. 6" b/w "Questionnaire" (2005) Acid Bird Records 7-inch

== Videos ==
- The Willowz at Grrrnd Zero (France, Lyon 2008)
