= Gabba Gabba Hey: A Tribute to the Ramones =

Compilation album by Various artists
- Released: August 30, 1991
- Genre: Punk rock
- Label: Triple X

Ramones tribute albums chronology
Gabba Gabba Hey: A Tribute to the Ramones (1991)	Blitzkrieg Over You! (1998)

Professional ratings
Review scores
Source	Rating
Allmusic	3/5 stars
MusicHound Rock	2.5/5 stars

Gabba Gabba Hey: A Tribute to the Ramones is a Ramones tribute album. While many recorded tributes to the Ramones would be recorded subsequently, this was the first such effort. It was released in 1991 on the Triple X label. The record is named after the band's famous slogan Gabba Gabba Hey, from the song "Pinhead" on their album Leave Home.

== Track listing ==
No.	Title	Writer(s)	Performer	Length
1.	"Sha-La-La (Howling At The Moon)"	Dee Dee Ramone	Buglamp featuring Keith Morris	3:50
2.	"She's A Sensation"	Joey Ramone	D.I.	3:06
3.	"Beat On The Brat"	Joey Ramone	Pigmy Love Circus	2:48
4.	"Suzy Is A Headbanger"	Dee Dee Ramone, Joey Ramone	L7	3:10
5.	"Psycho Therapy"	Dee Dee Ramone, Joey Ramone	Rigor Mortis	2:22
6.	"I Don't Wanna Go Down To The Basement"	Dee Dee Ramone, Joey Ramone	The Flesh Eaters	4:40
7.	"Glad To See You Go"	Dee Dee Ramone, Joey Ramone	Badtown Boys	1:20
8.	"I Want You Around"	Ramones	Chemical People	2:41
9.	"Pet Sematary"	Dee Dee Ramone, Daniel Rey	Groovie Ghoulies	3:27
10.	"Commando"	Dee Dee Ramone	Flower Leperds	1:41
11.	"Rockaway Beach"	Dee Dee Ramone	Mojo Nixon	2:31
12.	"We're A Happy Family"	Joey Ramone	Bad Religion	2:22
13.	"Chinese Rocks"	Dee Dee Ramone, Richard Hell	Jeff Dahl and Poison Idea	2:15
14.	"We Want The Airwaves"	Joey Ramone	Tommyknockers	3:17
15.	"Babysitter"	Joey Ramone	White Flag	2:46
16.	"I Remember You"	Joey Ramone	Metal Mike, Lisa & Julia	2:10
17.	"Loudmouth"	Ramones	The Motorcycle Boy	2:03
18.	"Bonzo Goes to Bitburg"	Joey Ramone	The Agnews	3:23
19.	"53rd & 3rd"	Dee Dee Ramone	Creamers	1:45
20.	"Now I Wanna Sniff Some Glue"	Dee Dee Ramone	Bl'ast	4:37
21.	"Endless Vacation"	Dee Dee Ramone, Johnny Ramone	Bulimia Banquet	1:46
22.	"I Don't Care"	Joey Ramone	Electric Ferrets	1:28
23.	"Sheena Is a Punk Rocker" (appears on bonus 7" and Japanese CD)	Joey Ramone	The Vandals	2:16
24.	"Judy Is a Punk" (appears on bonus 7" and Japanese CD)	Joey Ramone	The Vandals	1:28
