= The Song Remains the Same =

The Song Remains the Same may refer to:

== Related to Led Zeppelin ==
- "The Song Remains the Same" (song), from their 1973 album Houses of the Holy
- The Song Remains the Same (film), the band's 1973 concert film
- The Song Remains the Same (album), the soundtrack album of the concert film

== Television episodes ==
- "The Song Remains the Same" (Dawson's Creek), 2002
- "The Song Remains the Same" (Medium), 2005
- "The Song Remains the Same" (Supernatural), 2010

== See also ==
- The Song Remains Not the Same, an album by Black Label Society
- The Song Remains Insane, an album by Dread Zeppelin
