= George Tabb =

George Tabb is a founding member and song writer in such punk bands as Roach Motel, Atoms for Peace (a Gainesville Florida '80s band, not the more recent "supergroup"), False Prophets, Letch Patrol, Gynocologists, Iron Prostate and Furious George.

George was a resident of Lower Manhattan during the September 11, 2001 attacks.

== Bibliography ==
- Playing Right Field: A Jew Grows In Greenwich
- Surfing Armageddon: Fascists, Fishnets and Body Fluids In Florida
- Take My Life Please - Chroniques
