= The Frantics (punk band) =

American punk rock band

The Frantics was an American punk rock band from Clinton, South Carolina, United States. Founded by Kevin Mac (vocals/guitar), Timmy Timmy (guitar/vocals), Anthony Price (bass/vocals) and Todd Skeleton (drums/skinny). Drew Perry replaced Skeleton on drums in late 1998, but only recorded a handful of songs with the band.

The band formed out of high school in 1995, and began recording immediately (one demo album and two 7-inch EPs in their first year). Frantics toured the U.S. through 1999, releasing two albums and two more singles during that time (along with several compilation tracks).

They have toured with and/or supported touring bands including AFI, Parasites, Cletus, Against All Authority, The Pull-Outs, Blanks 77, Flatus, The Vandals, MU330, The Bouncing Souls, The Force, Zeke and Mustard Plug.

2005 saw a one-time "reunion" show for the Frantics, playing to raise funds for a cancer-stricken local club owner that booked them during their heyday. Within a year of reuniting, Kevin, Anthony and Drew formed The Black Kites, who released a four song EP and played shows through 2008.

In 2018, the Frantics were named the representatives for South Carolina in Kerrang's "The United States of Punk."

== Discography ==
1. Here's to You demo cassette (1995, SideWise Records)
2. She's A Drag 7-inch EP (1996, Wedge Records)
3. Playing Dumb 7-inch EP (1996, Wedge Records)
4. Downtown Delirium 7-inch EP (1997, Mutant Pop Records)
5. It's Casual LP (1998, Trend Is Dead! Records)
6. Downer LP/CD (1999, Spider Club Music)
7. Frantics / Black Left Pinky split 7-inch (2000, Trend Is Dead! Records)
