= Linda S. Stein =

American music manager and real estate agent (1945–2007)

Linda Stein
- Stein on the closing night of the club CBGB in October 2006
- Born: April 24, 1945; Bronx, New York, U.S.
- Died: October 30, 2007 (aged 62); Manhattan, New York, U.S.
- Cause of death: Bludgeoned to death
- Known for: Co-manager of Ramones; "real estate agent to the stars"
- Spouse: Seymour Stein (ex-husband)
- Children: 2, including Mandy Stein

Linda Stein (April 24, 1945 – October 30, 2007) was an American rock music manager and real estate broker.

== Life and career ==
Stein began her career as a teacher, but left teaching to manage the Ramones with Danny Fields. She also managed singer/songwriter Steve Forbert. She was a fixture in clubs from Studio 54 to the Mudd Club and later a reliable voice in gossip columns, aided by her quick wit and fanciful way with a four-letter word.

Stein was married to and advised Seymour Stein, president of Sire Records and vice president of Warner Bros. Records, who was instrumental in launching the careers of Madonna, The Ramones, Talking Heads, and The Pretenders. Their marriage ended in divorce.

In the 1990s, Stein left band management and became a "real estate agent to the stars." She landed mega-million-dollar apartments for Madonna, Sting, Angelina Jolie, Billy Joel, Christie Brinkley, Bruce Willis, Jann Wenner, Michael Douglas, Steven Spielberg, and Elton John.

According to her friend, author Steven Gaines, Stein reportedly inspired two movie characters: the real estate agent (played by Sylvia Miles) who sells a high-rise apartment to Charlie Sheen's character in Oliver Stone's Wall Street and a predatory record executive in the 1998 movie 54.

== Death ==
On October 30, 2007, Stein was found dead in her apartment in Manhattan. The coroner ruled Stein's death a homicide and attributed the cause to "blunt impact trauma to the head and neck." At the time of her death, Stein had been battling a brain tumor.

=== Conviction of assailant ===
On November 9, 2007, Stein's former personal assistant Natavia Lowery was arrested. According to reports, the assistant killed her boss because Stein "just kept yelling at her." She also claimed that Stein had blown marijuana smoke into her face and made a racial slur, but an autopsy determined that there was no marijuana in Stein's system. While in police custody for questioning, police say Lowery waived her Miranda rights. She recounted her version of the events in a videotaped confession. At a December 13, 2007 court hearing, however, the Lowery family disrupted the proceedings to loudly accuse Stein's daughter Mandy of killing her mother; afterward, Lowery's mother approached Mandy Stein, saying, "You know you did it." On May 3, 2010, Lowery was sentenced to the maximum 25 years to life for murdering Stein, including three years for the theft of $30,000 from her.

=== Estate ===
The New York County Surrogate's Court determined that Stein died intestate. Accordingly, under New York State law her next of kin, her two daughters, inherited her estate. On December 18, 2007, they filed a petition with the court asking for control of Stein's estate. It was accepted the same day.

== Legacy ==
Singer Elton John said that he would perform in a cancer research fundraiser in Stein's honor.

On April 24, 2009, which would have been Linda Stein's 64th birthday, Mandy Stein's film Burning Down the House: The Rise and Fall of CBGB – dedicated to her mother – premiered at the Tribeca Film Festival.
