= Seymour Stein =

American music executive (1942–2023)

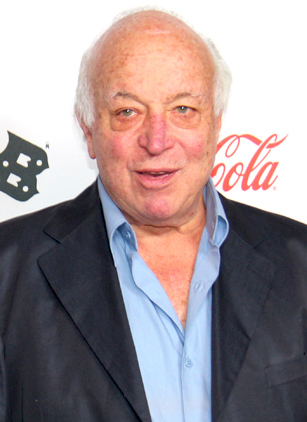
- Stein in 2013
- Born: Seymour Steinbigle; April 18, 1942; New York City, U.S.
- Died: April 2, 2023 (aged 80); Los Angeles, California, U.S.
- Occupations: Entrepreneur; music executive
- Spouse: Linda S. Stein (divorced)
- Children: 2, including Mandy Stein
- Awards: Member of the Rock and Roll Hall of Fame

Seymour Steinbigle (April 18, 1942 – April 2, 2023), known professionally as Seymour Stein, was an American entrepreneur and music executive. He co-founded Sire Records and was vice president of Warner Bros. Records. With Sire, Stein signed bands that became central to the new wave era of the 1970s and 1980s, including The Ramones, Talking Heads, and The Pretenders; he signed Madonna as well. He was inducted into the Rock and Roll Hall of Fame in 2005.

== Career ==
Stein was born in New York City. As a 13-year-old high school student, he worked as a clerk at the music industry magazine, Billboard, where he assisted the head of Billboard charts, Tommy Noonan. Together they helped develop the Billboard Hot 100, launched in August 1958.

King Records owner Syd Nathan approached Stein to work for him in Cincinnati, Ohio. Stein's father was skeptical, but King told him "Your son has shellac in his veins. Your son is good for one thing and one thing only, and that's being in the record business. If you don't let him into the music business, he will wind up delivering newspapers for the rest of your life. If you don't want that on your conscience, you will let him come with me for the summer." Stein started work for King, working there for two years as an intern before joining the company in 1961.

Homesick, he returned to New York in 1963 to work for Herb Abramson, but this was short-lived, lasting only three months. He then became an assistant to impresario George Goldner, who had formed Red Bird Records with songwriters Jerry Leiber and Mike Stoller in 1963.

Working there in the Brill Building, he became friends with FGG Productions record producer Richard Gottehrer. Seeing that relations between Goldner and Leiber and Stoller were fracturing, he decided to start a new venture. He founded Sire Productions in 1966 with Gottehrer, each investing ten thousand dollars into the new company, which led to the formation of Sire Records. That year, Stein had an opportunity to sign Jimi Hendrix, praising him for his original material, but ultimately decided against doing so after witnessing Hendrix smash his guitar and argue with his friend, Linda Keith.

The label initially concentrated on licensing European releases with little success, until Dutch progressive rock band Focus had an international hit with the 1973 single "Hocus Pocus." Gottehrer left the label in 1974 to concentrate on production; Stein then focused on scouting new acts in the New York clubs. On his wife's recommendation, he arranged for the Ramones to do a showcase, signing them in 1975. Other signings soon followed including Talking Heads, Richard Hell & the Voidoids, the Pretenders in 1980, and foreign punk acts The Rezillos and The Saints. Stein signed Madonna from his hospital bed after hearing her track "Everybody" in 1982. Other acts signed by Sire include The Replacements, Depeche Mode, The Smiths, The Cure, Ice-T, Brian Wilson, Ministry, The Undertones, and Echo & the Bunnymen.

Such was Stein's influence in signing and promoting the new wave genre of music that he is sometimes credited with having come up with the name as an alternative to the term "punk", which he found derogatory. Believing the use of the term would mean poor sales for Sire's acts who had frequently played the New York club CBGB, he launched a "Don't Call It Punk" campaign designed to replace the term with "new wave". That term had previously been used to refer to the French New Wave film movement of the 1960s.

Stein was the president of Sire Records as well as vice president of Warner Bros. Records until his announced retirement on July 18, 2018. He had had a marketing and distribution deal from 1976 to 1994 and again from April 2003 until his retirement. He was inducted into the Rock and Roll Hall of Fame on March 14, 2005, under the lifetime-achievement category. On June 9, 2016, Stein was honored with the Richmond Hitmaker Award at the Songwriters Hall of Fame.

== Legacy ==
Stein was the subject of an eponymous song by the Scottish musical group Belle and Sebastian about a failed attempt to sign the group. He was the winner of a Lifetime Achievement Award at the International Dance Music Awards in 2010. Ice-T wrote about Stein in his autobiography, stating: "He's cut from that cloth of the old-time music executives like Clive Davis, but he's way more eccentric... Just a little more bizarre, a bit more avant-garde, more of an edgy cat." He wrote that Stein would never edit his musical output, but would sometimes express concerns (e.g. he was against homophobia in rap).

== Personal life and death ==
Stein was married to the music promoter and real estate executive Linda Stein (1945–2007) and together the couple had two daughters, Samantha (who died as a result of brain cancer in 2013 at the age of 40) and film director Mandy Stein. They divorced on amicable terms in the late 1970s; he never remarried. He was born Jewish and publicly came out as gay in 2017. Stein published his autobiography, Siren Song: My Life in Music, in 2018.

Stein died of cancer at home in Los Angeles on April 2, 2023, aged 80.
