= I Wanna Be Your Boyfriend =

1976 single by Ramones

Single by the Ramones

from the album Ramones
- B-side: "California Sun" / "I Don't Wanna Walk Around With You" (live)
- Released: September 1976
- Recorded: January 1976
- Genre: Punk rock; pop punk
- Length: 2:24
- Label: Sire
- Songwriter: Tommy Ramone
- Producer: Craig Leon

The Ramones singles chronology
"Blitzkrieg Bop" (1976)	"I Wanna Be Your Boyfriend" (1976)	"Carbona Not Glue" (1977)

"I Wanna Be Your Boyfriend"

Single by Per Gessle

from the album The Song Ramones the Same
- Released: September 9, 2002 (Sweden)
- Recorded: July 2001
- Studio: Polar Studios, Stockholm
- Genre: Punk rock
- Length: 3:57
- Label: White Jazz
- Songwriter: Tommy Ramone
- Producers: Per Gessle, Clarence Öfwerman

Per Gessle singles chronology
"I Want You to Know" (1997)	"I Wanna Be Your Boyfriend" (2002)	"Här kommer alla känslorna" (2003)

"I Wanna Be Your Boyfriend" is a song by the American punk rock band Ramones. Written by drummer Tommy Ramone, it was released on the first Ramones album. It was also released as the Ramones' second single, following "Blitzkrieg Bop".

== Background ==
"I Wanna Be Your Boyfriend" is the fourth track on the Ramones' debut album, Ramones. It was released as a single in September 1976. The song was written around 1975, as two demos of the tune were made prior to the debut and single releases.
