= False Alarm (band) =

American punk rock band

- Origin: Los Angeles, California, U.S.
- Genres: Punk rock, rock
- Years active: 1982–1983; 1996–1999; 2001–present
- Labels: False Alarm Records, Nicotine Records, Mystic Records, Rat Trend Records
- Members: Brent "Aldo" Alden; Paul Kostabi; Art Chianello
- Past members: Chris Prettyman; Justin Time; Fat Mike; Punk Floyd; Paul Aragon; Dylan "D-Rock" Maunder; Jacob Mon; Rick Wilder; Cheetah Chrome; De Detroit

False Alarm is an American punk rock band founded in Beverly Hills, Los Angeles, in 1982.

== History ==
False Alarm started in 1982. Brent Alden, bass player for the band, recalled, "We started calling it False Alarm because we pulled alarms by the Fairfax District". In the early days, the band was not well organized. Membership varied, including Fat Mike, later of NOFX. They were influenced by the Ramones, Dead Boys, Black Flag, Angry Samoans, and Reagan Youth. In 1983 the band broke up.

In 1996 the guys started a new version of the band and released some new and old recordings. Beverly Hills High School friends Paul Aragon (lead vocals), Brent Alden (bass), Dylan Maunder (guitar), Punk Floyd all original members and new cast member Art Chianello (drummer) joined the band and they started playing shows mainly at Al's Bar, the Anti-Club, and other venues between Los Angeles and San Francisco. In 1998 they released a 7-song CD entitled Learning Is Impossible. It had six new songs and one from 1983 featuring Fat Mike on lead vocals. The newly formed band broke up in 1999.

In 2001 False Alarm got back together with guitarist Dylan Maunder replacing Paul Aragon on vocals. Brent Alden, Art Chianello, and Dylan Maunder began recording a new CD. They were joined by Paul Kostabi of Youth Gone Mad after Alden had an opportunity to meet Dee Dee Ramone. Kostabi and Ramone painted the album cover for the new False Alarm CD, Fuck 'Em All We've All Ready (Now) Won!, which includes a song called "Youth Gone Mad", about the band. In 2002, Brent sent a demo tape to Cheetah Chrome of the Dead Boys and Rocket from the Tombs, who agreed to participate. He highly rates False Alarm in his interviews: "I really think they are a great band in the Social Distortion vein, with intelligent lyrics written by guys who have lived the hell they sing about… They have more heart and talent than anybody I've heard in a long, long, time." The band also recruited two veterans of the LA underground punk scene for a record: De De Troit of U.X.A. and Rick Wilder from The Mau Maus and formerly the Berlin Brats. In 2002 after Dee Dee Ramones death a song he wrote and recorded with Paul Kostabi entitled False Alarm for the guys was released on CD. Quite an honor for the band. For various reasons the Fuck Em All We've All Ready (Now) Won! CD was not released until 2006, when a reviewer at Maximum RocknRoll judged them to be "channeling the sound and feel of '70s NYC junkie punk".

Maunder died in 2005. In 2009 False Alarm put out a CD together with Youth Gone Mad, and signed with Italian record label Nicotine Records, who released Fuck 'Em All We've All Ready (Now) Won! in Europe. In 2011 they released Buspar for Bedbug, a compilation of songs recorded as early as 1983 and others recorded in the 2000s, including "Vietnamese Baby" and "High Tension Wire", and rehearsal recordings.

== Discography ==
Albums

- 1998-83 — Learning Is Impossible
- 2006 — Fuck 'Em All We've All Ready (Now) Won!
- 2009 — False Alarm / Youth Gone Mad with Dee Dee Ramone
- 2011 — Buspar for Bedbug

7"

- 2002 — "Meatball Sandwich" (b/w "Youth Gone Mad with Joey Ramone")
- 2007 — "Tell Me Who I Am" (b/w "Frogman From Mars")

Various artists

- 1998 — Orange County's Punk vs. Ska: Round Two
- 2011 Chaotic reasoning Comp. Kaos Records.
- 2013 Chaotic Reasoning Vol 2 Comp. Kaos Records
