= The Encyclopedia of Punk =

- Author: Brian Cogan
- Original title: The Encyclopedia of Punk Music and Culture
- Language: English
- Subject: Punk music and culture
- Genre: Reference book
- Publisher: Greenwood Press
- Publication date: 2006
- ISBN: 978-0-313-33340-8
- OCLC: 791194352

The Encyclopedia of Punk is a reference book about punk rock written by Brian Cogan, an associate professor in the Department of Communications at Molloy College in Long Island, New York. The book's original title was The Encyclopedia of punk music and culture. The book traces the history of punk from its origins in the 1960s and 1970s to the present day. A large part of the book is made up of rare photos of bands.

== See also ==
- Punk rock
- Punk subculture
