= Trend Is Dead! Records =

Independent record label based in Normal, Illinois, United States

- Founded: 1995
- Genre: Alternative, punk rock
- Country of origin: U.S.
- Location: Normal
- Official website: /trendisdeadrecords.blogspot.com

Trend Is Dead! Records (stylized tREND iS dEAD! records) is an independent record label in Normal, Illinois. The label was founded in 1995 and released titles on cassette and vinyl before switching to compact discs.

Trend Is Dead! is recognized for its punk releases, although some have delved into experimental, rock, garage, industrial, and hardcore. The label has released material by Frantics, Dee Dee Ramone, Dade County Resistance, Black Left Pinky, Santa's Dead, Youth Gone Mad, and Sonny Vincent and the Bad Reactions.

== Compilation albums ==
After some success pressing small runs of tapes of local artists, Trend Is Dead! Records began issuing ten band compilation cassettes involving bands from the Blo/No scene, alongside other groups from across the United States. The first CD released by Trend Is Dead! Records was the Trendy Compilation in 1998.

- tREND iS dEAD! Volume One (1996)
- tREND iS dEAD! Volume Two (1997)
- tREND iS dEAD! Volume Three (1998)
- Trendy Compilation (1998)
- Worse Than Alternative It's Another PUNK COMP (1999)
- Ramones Maniacs (tribute, 2001)
- ¿dEAD iS tREND? Sampler (2005)

== Artists ==
- Black Left Pinky
- Brothers Boch
- Cletus
- Courtney Ono
- Dade County Resistance
- Dee Dee Ramone
- End Me
- Frantics
- Love Camp 7
- OPIUM
- Pee Pee Touchers
- The Pull-Outs
- Sonny Vincent
- t.r. (Totally Ridiculous)
- Youth Gone Mad

== See also ==
- List of record labels
