= Youth Gone Mad =

American punk rock band

- Origin: Los Angeles, California, United States
- Genres: Punk rock, hardcore punk
- Years active: 1980–present
- Past members: Tami Sarno Esquivel Contreras; Paul Kostabi; Dee Dee Ramone; Barbara Zampini; Buz; Bob Drums

Youth Gone Mad is an American punk rock band founded in Los Angeles, California, United States, in 1980 by Paul "ENA" Kostabi (also of White Zombie and Psychotica). Youth Gone Mad signed onto the Posh Boy Records roster, scored a minor radio hit with "Oki Dogs" in 1981, and played with bands such as Black Flag, Caustic Cause, The Mentors, The Stains, Fear, and others.

The band migrated east to New York, and went through numerous line-up changes along the way. At one time or another, the ranks included future Cults singer Madeline Follin and Dee Dee Ramone and Joey Ramone from the Ramones.

In the year 2000, the album Touching Cloth was released as an import only. The album features guitar by Dee Dee Ramone and vocals from Madeline Follin, singing cover versions of Adolescents' "Amoeba" and Hammerbrain's "Killer In Your Radio." The songs featuring the Cults singer and Ramones bass player were excised from the album and it was released as Oompa Loompa in the United States.

In 2002, Youth Gone Mad released Youth Gone Mad featuring Dee Dee Ramone on tREND iS dEAD! records and Wanker Records. The album included the former Ramones songwriter/bass player's final studio recordings. Dee Dee played guitar and did backing vocals on most tracks (lead on "False Alarm" and "Horror Hospital"). Additionally, the song "Meatball Sandwich" was co-written and recorded with Joey Ramone. This release also featured Psychotica drummer Buz.

Youth Gone Mad has released seven studio albums and several 7" singles and splits, including False Alarm, Letch Patrol, Los Gusanos and more.

In 2011, Youth Gone Mad released Numbers, with the original line up from Los Angeles. It was recorded at Thunderdome Studios and Clown Sound Studios.

"Meatball Sandwich" is a 7" split single of the American bands Youth Gone Mad and False Alarm, released in 2002 and limited to 100 copies on pink vinyl.
