= Blitzkrieg Bop =

Single by Ramones

from the album Ramones
- B-side: "Havana Affair"
- Released: February 1976
- Recorded: January 1976
- Genre: Punk rock; pop punk
- Length: 2:12
- Label: Sire/ABC
- Songwriters: Tommy Ramone; Dee Dee Ramone
- Producer: Craig Leon

Ramones singles chronology
"Blitzkrieg Bop" (1976)	"I Wanna Be Your Boyfriend" (1976)

Music video
- "Blitzkrieg Bop" on YouTube

"Blitzkrieg Bop", titled "The Blitzkrieg Bop!!" on its single release, is the debut single by American punk rock band Ramones, released in February 1976. It was the opening track on the band's self-titled debut album.

Although its composition was credited to the band as a whole, the song was written by drummer Tommy Ramone (music and lyrics) and bassist Dee Dee Ramone (lyrics). The song's "big dumb chant" ("Hey! Ho! Let's go!") became a global rallying cry at sporting events.

"Blitzkrieg Bop" was number 92 on the 2004 Rolling Stone list of The 500 Greatest Songs of All Time. In March 2005, Q magazine placed it at number 31 in its list of the 100 Greatest Guitar Tracks, and in 2008 Rolling Stone placed it number 18 of the top 100 Greatest Guitar Songs of All Time.

== Origin and meaning ==
The song was mainly written by drummer Tommy Ramone, while bassist Dee Dee Ramone came up with the title (the song was originally called "Animal Hop").

The precise meaning and subject matter of the song is, unlike many of the Ramones' other early compositions, somewhat vague and obscure. Tommy Ramone said it was the story of the young audience attending a rock concert ("they're forming in a straight line", "are losing their minds", "are shouting in the back now"). Blitzkrieg is a reference to the German World War II tactic blitzkrieg, which means "lightning war" (fast attack). Dee Dee also changed one other line: the original third verse had the line "shouting in the back now", but Dee Dee changed it to "shoot 'em in the back now".

The idea for a chant at the beginning of the song came from the 1973 Bay City Rollers hit song "Saturday Night", which begins with the chant "S-A-T-U-R-D-A-Y night"; Tommy Ramone wanted the Ramones to have a similarly catchy chant. The lyrics "Hey ho, let's go" were inspired by the line "High, low, tipsy toe" from the 1963 song "Walking the Dog" by Rufus Thomas, and specifically the Rolling Stones' cover of the song; the band had enjoyed mocking Mick Jagger's pronunciation of the line, which they thought sounded more like "hey ho". Tommy stated later that he "came up with the chant walking home from the grocery store carrying a bag of groceries."

== Reception ==
Cash Box said the song had "a hard rock style, crudely fashioned, yet infectious in its energy" and said that "the tune is powerful, and the band's street punk stance is all part of the music." Record World said it has "a wall of sound effect and [spouts] punk lyrics".

== Legacy and influence ==
While the Ramones' self-titled debut album, which was released on April 23, 1976, is considered to have established the musical genre of punk rock, Michael Hann pointed out that the album's derivative and preceding single, "Blitzkrieg Bop", was therefore "the first artefact of punk rock"; that is, the first product by the record industry of that genre.

== Certifications ==
Certifications for "Blitzkrieg Bop"
Region	Certification	Certified units/sales
Italy (FIMI)	Gold	50,000^{‡}
New Zealand (RMNZ)	Gold	15,000^{‡}
Spain (Promusicae)	Gold	30,000^{‡}
United Kingdom (BPI)	Silver	200,000^{‡}
United States (RIAA)	2× Platinum	2,000,000^{‡}
^{‡} Sales+streaming figures based on certification alone.

== Bibliography ==
- Bessman, Jim (1993). Ramones: An American Band (New York: St. Martin's). ISBN 0-312-09369-1
