= Believer (Laura Dawn album) =

Studio album by Laura Dawn
- Released: October 9, 2001
- Genre: Rock
- Length: 66:06
- Label: Extasy International/Warner Bros.
- Producers: Laura Dawn; Carl Glanville; Ted Niceley; Simeon Spiegel; Yoshiki

Believer is a 2001 album by Laura Dawn. It was released by the now-defunct Extasy International Records, an offshoot of the Extasy Records label created by X Japan drummer Yoshiki, and distributed by Warner Bros. It features a hidden track, "Jump Into the Fire", originally by Harry Nilsson.

Dawn described the album as the soundtrack to her rollercoaster life of the preceding few years. She toured the US in support of the album.

The album was produced by Ted Niceley (Fugazi), and the session musicians included Tommy Stinson of the Replacements and Robt Ptak of Size 14 on bass/guitar, drummers Josh Freese from A Perfect Circle and Kevin March of Shudder to Think, and guitarist Richard Fortus of the Psychedelic Furs.

"I Would", taken from the album, reached number 37 on the Billboard Adult Pop Songs chart.

== Reception ==
Professional ratings
Review scores
Source	Rating
AllMusic	2/5 stars

Stephanie Dickison, reviewing the album for PopMatters, viewed it positively, calling Dawn "a woman that dares to contradict, a woman who uses words wisely and humorously". Spin called it a "sweetly vicious debut, which is equal parts power pop and sugary punk, like Siouxsie Sioux meets Jewel". Tony Bowman, writing for Ink 19, said the following: "In keeping with Dawn's country upbringing, the songs contained here tell individual stories that give you an idea of what her life has been like. Unlike her country upbringing, these songs rock....The album also has a softer side that is showcased brilliantly with 'Useless In LA,' the album's finest moment. After a couple of listens, you'll walk away feeling that you’ve known Laura most of your life. That is what separates this disc from a lot of the music out today—it's honest, sincere, and a lot of fun to listen to."

AllMusic writer Hal Horowitz gave the album a two star rating, calling it "a sturdy debut from a remarkably assured singer/songwriter with a knack for writing songs and hooks that sound familiar on first listen".

== Track listing ==
Believer track listing
No.	Title	Composer	Length
1.	"Free and Lonely Life"	Laura Dawn/Simeon Spiegel	4:33
2.	"The Old You"	Dawn/Spiegel	3:34
3.	"Nothing to Me"	Dawn	1:52
4.	"Party Girl"	Dawn	4:08
5.	"Believer"	Dawn	4:16
6.	"Useless in L.A."	Dawn	4:25
7.	"Delicious"	Dawn/Spiegel	3:24
8.	"So Small"	Dawn/Spiegel	4:33
9.	"I Would"	Dawn/Linus of Hollywood	3:45
10.	"Love You Less"	Dawn/Spiegel	4:36
11.	"The Best Part"	Dawn	3:44
12.	"Wasted"	Dawn	3:00
13.	"Recognize"	Dawn/Spiegel	4:18
14.	"Hang On"	Dawn	4:53
15.	"The Last Song"	Dawn/Spiegel	5:22
16.	"Jump Into the Fire" (hidden track, cover)	Harry Nilsson	6:00
