= The Bastard Kings of Rock =

New York rock band

- Origin: New York City, United States
- Genres: Rock
- Years active: 2001–2004
- Label: Unsigned
- Past members: Robt Ptak; Aristotle Dreher; Michael Hamilton; Alex Elena; Buz

The Bastard Kings of Rock were a local New York rock band formed by American bassist Robt Ptak, of the band Size 14. The band was started after Ptak's formed band Artificial Joy disbanded in 2001. The Bastard Kings of Rock were a three piece group with Aristotle Dreher on bass and Michael Hamilton on drums. Hamilton left the band in 2004 to join the band Vaeda and was replaced by Alex Elena. Elena's stay in the band was short-lived as the band split later the same year. At one time former Psychotica drummer Buz also played with the band.

The band self-released a 4-song sampler. After the group disbanded, Ptak managed Pin Me Down. Elena was also involved with Pin Me Down as producer of their album.
