= Robt Ptak =

American singer

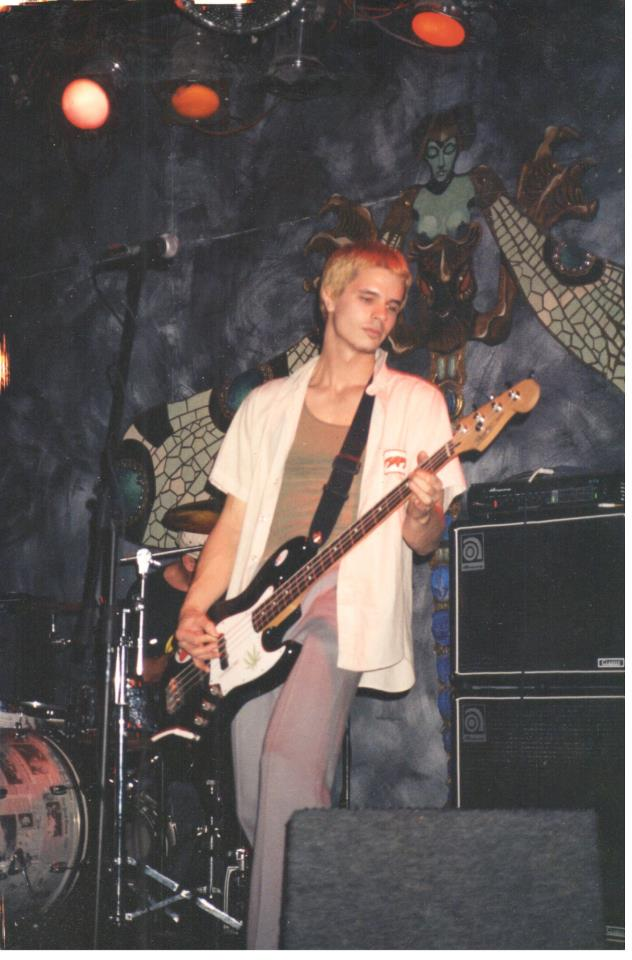
- Robert Ptak

Background information
- Also known as: Robt Ptak
- Born: Robert Pak; October 13, 1970 (age 55)
- Genres: Rock
- Occupations: Singer-songwriter, guitarist, bassist, record producer
- Instruments: Vocals, guitar, drums, bass
- Years active: 1992–present

Robt Ptak (born October 13, 1970) is an American rock singer-songwriter, guitarist, bassist, and record producer who is the co-founding member and bassist/backing vocalist for 1990s pop punk band Size 14.

== Career ==
=== Size 14 ===
The band Size 14 was formed when Ptak placed an ad in a Los Angeles classified magazine. Ptak and bandmate Linus of Hollywood recorded all of the band's early demos on Ptak's 8 Track. Ptak can also be heard singing backing vocals and the high falsettos parts on the band's songs. Ptak left the band in 1997 and was replaced by Ray Santangelo.

=== Other projects ===
In 1996 Ptak toured with Jakob Dylan as a bass player and backup vocalist, playing songs from the album titled "Bringing Down the Horse" during which he recorded "Pain in my Head", with Andrew Slater Dylan's manager, which was engineered by Tobi Miller of The Wallflowers. Ptak was involved with The Wallflowers between the years 1996–1997 when Size 14 was signed.

Later Ptak moved to New York City to start a live version of his solo-project Artificial Joy which consisted of singer Milena Mepris (who later went to form Pin Me Down), bassist Mark Cevellos, and drummer Alex Elena. Later, drummer John Lamkin also joined. The band produced one 7 track CD. After Artificial Joy disbanded, Ptak played bass and guitar on Laura Dawn's album titled "Believer" in 2001, along with Laura Dawn, Carl Glanville, Ted Niceley, Harry Nilsson, Simeon Spiegel and Yoshiki. Ptak also formed the rock band The Bastard Kings of Rock with Ptak on Lead vocals and lead guitar, Aristotle Dreher on bass and Michael Hamilton on drums, the band split up in 2004, after which Ptak focused on management and production.

=== Work as manager ===
Ptak was the manager of Pin Me Down the side project from Bloc Party guitarist Russell Lissack and Artificial Joy singer Milena Mepris. Ptak and Renee Frisch also executive produced the band's album, while Alex Elena was the album's producer.

=== Current ===
Robt Ptak has released demos/studio recordings via a SoundCloud page through the name DPG MEDIA. Ptak has also released some of this music via his Facebook Musician Page.

== Bands ==
Band	Position	Years active
The Wallflowers	Bassist, Backing vocals	1996–1997
Size 14	Backing Vocals, Bassist, Co Founder	1995–1997
Artificial Joy	Vocals, Guitar, Drums, Bass, Primary Songwriter	1992–2001
The Bastard Kings of Rock	Vocals, Guitar, Primary Songwriter	2001–2004
Pin Me Down	Exec Producer, Manager	2005–2008

== Discography ==
=== Size 14 ===
- "Size 14" (1997)

=== Laura Dawn album ===
- "Believer" (2001)
