= Size 14 (album) =

Studio album by Size 14
- Released: July 29, 1997
- Recorded: 1997
- Studio: Rumbo Recorders, Canoga Park, Los Angeles, California
- Genre: Alternative rock, power pop, pop punk
- Label: Volcano Entertainment
- Producer: Mike Clink

Professional ratings
Review scores
Source	Rating
Punknews.org	5/5 stars

Size 14 is the first and only studio album by the American rock band of the same name. It was released in 1997 by Volcano Entertainment, with all songs being produced by Mike Clink.

== Recording and promotion ==
Size 14 formed in 1995 in Hollywood, California, and started recording their debut album after signing with Volcano Entertainment in February 1997. The performance that helped them get signed occurred during January 1997, at a gig for record executives in New York City. Vocalist Linus of Hollywood hastily scribbled what would become the lyrics to the song "Shane" on a vomit bag during the flight from California to New York. After a quick tutorial at soundcheck, the band performed the song that night in New York, unfazed by the gig's high-pressure stakes.

The album spawned a single and music video for the track "Claire Danes Poster". The song lyrically revolves around a lonely male who regularly masturbates to a poster of the American actress Claire Danes. Danes had only recently turned 18 years old when the album was released. Regarding this song and the band's humorous lyrical themes, Linus of Hollywood said in October 1997, "I think we’re a little different and a little above being considered a novelty act. We're more than just funny; we're honest, rather than pulling things out of the air and trying to make people laugh. It's also very melodic." The closing track "Jimmy Whalen" was an actual answering machine message from Linus’ friend. He said, "It's totally for real. I love to listen to my answering machine, because he’s just too damn funny. I thought that one would fit in with the rest of the record, mentioning all the elements of Hollywood, so it was perfect."

For the album, Size 14 collaborated with Daryl Dragon of the Captain & Tennille, with Dragon performing his Moog synthesizer on five songs. Linus of Hollywood said in October 1997, "he owns the studio where we recorded this and he came in to help set some keyboards. We started playing something and said, 'Why don’t you play this part?' And he said okay. We didn’t have the vocals down yet, so I don’t think he really knew what we were singing about." Linus of Hollywood added that "he was on the Mark & Brian Show the other day, and I called in and said, 'I can’t believe you played on a song called ‘I Touched Her Ass.' He didn’t know what he was doing, but he was pretty cool."

Following the release of the album, the band went on a successful tour of the United States, and followed this up with a U.S. West coast tour in late 1997. The band's label went out of business shortly afterwards and they broke up in early 1998.

== Appearances in other media ==
In 2000, "Superbabe 2000" appeared in the film 100 Girls, with "Claire Danes Poster" also appearing in Dude, Where's My Car? that same year. In Dude, Where's My Car?, the song is played during a scene at a strip club. The following year, "Let's Rob a Bank" appeared in the closing credits of Sugar & Spice, a film which revolved around a group of teenage girls robbing a bank. In 2002, "I Touched Her Ass" also appeared in the film 100 Women (also known as Girl Fever).

== Reception ==
Professional ratings
Review scores
Source	Rating
Punknews	5/5 stars

The album received minor airplay in the United States during 1997, and it was also released in Japan and the Philippines. The album gained popularity in the Philippines, with "Claire Danes Poster" being played heavily on Manilla's NU 107 station. In a November 2001 review, Chris Gorman of PunkNews.org labelled it "one of the most under-appreciated albums of 1997", adding "In the year of ska-pop, Size 14 put out 14 tracks of pure power-pop bliss." In her 2000 book Claire Danes, author Jennifer Ambrose described "Claire Danes Poster" as a "dubious tribute" to the actress.

=== Track listing ===
No.	Title	Length
1.	"Claire Danes Poster"	3:01
2.	"Sleeping in The Wet Spot"	3:21
3.	"Shane"	3:17
4.	"Superbabe 2000"	4:22
5.	"Rollin In The 5-1-0"	3:14
6.	"People Get Really Drunk In Las Vegas"	3:01
7.	"Agostino"	0:17
8.	"Death Metal Steve"	3:55
9.	"Let's Rob a Bank"	3:15
10.	"Earthquake"	3:47
11.	"Formula Guy"	2:21
12.	"Prototype"	3:56
13.	"I Touched Her Ass"	4:07
14.	"Jimmy Whalen"	3:00

=== Unreleased tracks and compilation appearances ===
The following tracks were recorded during the album sessions with Mike Clink, but did not make the final studio release: the band's bassist Robt Ptak make the tracks available on his YouTube channel

- "Give Satan a Hug" – 3:51
- "Cooties" – 3:21
- "Faster" – 4:17

== Personnel ==
Band members

- Linus Of Hollywood – guitar, vocals,
- Robt Ptak – bass, backing vocals
- Dave Armstrong – drums, percussion
- Kevin Danczak – guitar
