= State of Nature =

State of nature is the hypothetical conditions of human life prior to the rise of societies.

State of Nature may also refer to:

- The State of Nature, a 1946 novel within Paul Goodman's The Empire City epic novel tetralogy
- State of Nature (album), a 2006 album by alternative rock band Vaeda
- State of Nature Report, a report by the British Royal Society for the Protection of Birds
