= Marley Shelton =

American actress (born 1974)

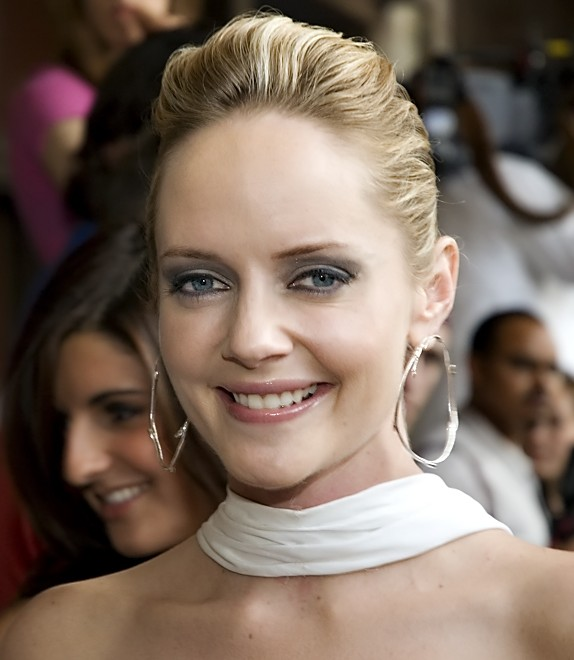
- Shelton at the premiere of Grindhouse (2007)
- Born: Marley Eve Shelton; April 12, 1974 (age 52); Los Angeles, California, U.S.
- Occupation: Actress
- Years active: 1990–present
- Spouse: Beau Flynn (m. 2001)
- Children: 2
- Relatives: Samantha Shelton (sister)

Marley Eve Shelton (born April 12, 1974) is an American actress. She is best known for her roles as Wendy Peffercorn in The Sandlot (1993), the Customer in Sin City (2005), Dr. Dakota Block in Grindhouse (2007), and Judy Hicks in two installments of the Scream franchise (2011–2022).

Shelton's other film credits include Warriors of Virtue (1997), Pleasantville (1998), The Bachelor (1999), Never Been Kissed (1999), Sugar & Spice (2001), Valentine (2001), Bubble Boy (2001), Uptown Girls (2003), (Untitled) (2009), and Rampage (2018). On television, she has starred in CBS's Eleventh Hour (2008–2009), Lifetime's The Lottery (2014), NBC's Rise (2018), and Paramount+'s 1923 (2022–2023).

== Early life ==
Marley Eve Shelton was born on April 12, 1974, in Los Angeles, California, to Carol (née Stromme), a teacher and former singer, and Christopher Shelton, a director and producer. The second of four daughters, Shelton's sisters are Koren, Erin and Samantha Shelton, who is also an actress and a musician. Shelton grew up in the residential neighborhood of Eagle Rock, where she attended Eagle Rock High School. She attended University of California, Los Angeles, where she studied film and theatre, and enrolled in acting lessons with Larry Moss and Robert Carnegie, while supporting her career through mainly small parts in film and television in the early 1990s. Shelton eventually dropped out of UCLA when she was cast in a leading role in the 1997 adventure film Warriors of Virtue.

== Career ==
=== 1990s ===
Shelton made her on-screen debut as Roberto's girlfriend at camp in Grand Canyon. She subsequently appeared in 1992's television movie Up to No Good playing Denise Harmon, and had several guest-appearances in episodes of shows such as Family Matters, Camp Wilder and Crossroads. Shelton found her profile raised significantly when she appeared in the 1993 film The Sandlot, playing the lifeguard Wendy Peffercorn. The movie received mixed feedback from critics and writers and, budgeted at US$7 million, was a box office success with a worldwide gross of over US$33 million. It has since developed a cult following. In 1994, Shelton had a supporting part in Hercules in the Underworld, the fourth made-for-television movie in the series Hercules: The Legendary Journeys. The following year, she was cast in a minor role, as former President Nixon's adult daughter Tricia Nixon Cox, in Oliver Stone's acclaimed film Nixon, and guest-appeared in the television series Cybill episode "The Big Sleep-Over". Shelton next co-starred alongside Lynda Carter in When Friendship Kills (1996), a made-for-television film about anorexia nervosa among teens.

1997 saw Shelton appear in the romantic comedy Trojan War, opposite Jennifer Love Hewitt, and in the fantasy film Warriors of Virtue, as Princess Elysia. Both films rated poorly with reviewers and failed to attract audiences, but James Berardinelli singled out Shelton for her performance in Warriors of Virtue, writing that her character is "the only one in the film that we develop any real interest in, and the script, apparently unable to deal with a personality having the potential to display more than one dimension, discards her perfunctorily and inelegantly".

A major film role came in 1998 with the fantasy comedy Pleasantville, in which Shelton portrayed Margaret, the love interest of Tobey Maguire's character. The movie did not find a wide audience in theaters, but received an extremely positive reaction from critics. This role was followed by a number of other appearances in films aimed at a teenage audience, including her role as a member of a snobby high school clique in 1999's sleeper hit Never Been Kissed, a romantic comedy co-starring Drew Barrymore and David Arquette. In 1999, Shelton also played the sister of a newly engaged woman in the critically panned romantic comedy The Bachelor, opposite Renée Zellweger, starred alongside Dennis Hopper in the independent drama Lured Innocence, and was cast by her father in the short Protect-O-Man, a black comedy about "an agoraphobic whose disorder is augmented by a stalker on the prowl in her neighborhood", as described by Cinema Review.

=== 2000s ===
Shelton took on significant roles in three feature films in 2001, which despite varying degrees of success, helped her establish herself as an up-and-coming actress. She starred in Francine McDougall's teen crime dark comedy Sugar & Spice, alongside Marla Sokoloff, Melissa George and Mena Suvari, which was Shelton's first film as a leading actress. She played Diane Weston, the head of a group of high school cheerleaders who conspire and commit armed robbery so Diane can afford to start a family with quarterback Jack Bartlett (portrayed by James Marsden) who got her pregnant. Despite negative reviews, Brendan Kelly of Variety found Shelton to be "good" as "the ridiculously peppy but still smart Diane", and Brian Orndorf of Film Fodder wrote: "The star who emerges from Spice unscathed is Marley Shelton. She achieves the unthinkable with this script by managing to create somewhat of a character for herself. A clear-eyed beauty, Shelton steals the film away from the sizable cast. She emerges as the only thing to recommend in the muddled and compromised Sugar & Spice." Budgeted at US$11 million, the film made US$16.9 million worldwide and became somewhat of a cult favorite afterwards.

In the slasher film Valentine, Shelton appeared opposite Denise Richards as friends who are being stalked by an unknown assailant while preparing for Valentine's Day. Released one week after Sugar and Spice, the film grossed a modest US$36 million worldwide and was largely panned. Mick LaSalle for San Francisco Chronicle, nevertheless, felt that the lead actors were "vivid, and the characters they play are clearly delineated", while he pointed out Shelton for having a "nice gravity" portraying her role. Her final film of 2001 was the comedy Bubble Boy, loosely based on the story of David Vetter, in which she played the love interest of a man living in a sterilized dome (Jake Gyllenhaal). A CNN reviewer found the production to be "stupid and devoid of any redeeming features", but Orndorf felt that Shelton made a "strong impression with her empathetic performance and her glowing good looks".

After focusing on studio features, Shelton appeared in a variety of independent films —she portrayed a troubled modern dancer in the dark comedy Just a Kiss (2002), with Kyra Sedgwick and Marisa Tomei, the dream girl of a mafia debt collector in the drama Dallas 362 (2003), and the love interest of producer Phil Kaufman in the dramedy Grand Theft Parsons (2003). Moving Alan, an independent production directed by her father, featured both Shelton and her sister Samantha. In 2005, Shelton made a brief but notable appearance as The Customer in the opening sequence of the successful film adaptation of Frank Miller's graphic novel Sin City. In 2006, she played small roles in Paul Weitz's black comedy American Dreamz and Tony Goldwyn's drama The Last Kiss.

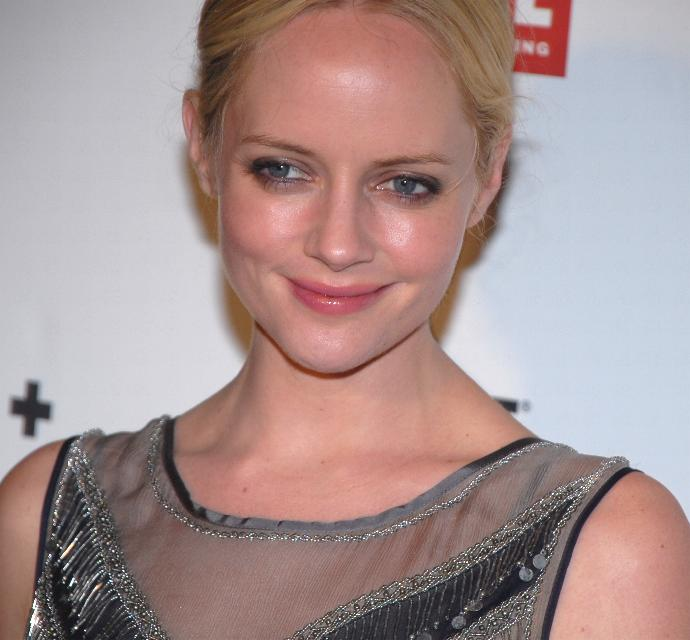
Shelton at Flaunt's 9th Anniversary Bash and Holiday Toy Drive, in October 2007

Shelton found larger attention for appearing in the lead role of Dr. Dakota Block in the Robert Rodriguez—Quentin Tarantino horror double feature picture Grindhouse, appearing in both of the film's segments (a cameo in Tarantino's segment, and a starring role in Rodriguez's). Delighted to work on "playing with the ideas of building suspense" with Rodriguez and Tarantino, who she described as "masters of their craft", she based her character in the female leads in Alfred Hitchcock's movies, specifically Tippi Hedren. The picture's ticket sales were significantly below box office analysts' expectations despite largely positive critic reviews.

In 2008, Shelton had a brief role as one of George W. Bush's girlfriends in Oliver Stone's biopic film W. and took on her first full-time television role in CBS's crime thriller series Eleventh Hour, appearing as FBI Special Agent Rachel Young. The show earned mixed reviews and was canceled after one season due to its inability to hold the CSI audience lead-in. Robert Bianco wrote for USA Today that she has "no character to play at all, or at least none that stays consistent between the two episodes made available for review", while Chicago Tribune remarked that her performance was "much less interesting" than co-star Rufus Sewell's and that whenever her character "opens her mouth, the show’s flaws come into sharp relief".

In 2009, Shelton played an offbeat tourist, opposite Milla Jovovich and Timothy Olyphant, in the psychological thriller A Perfect Getaway, and landed the leading role of Madeleine Gray, a trendy New York art gallery owner, in the independent comedy (Untitled). Describing her role in (Untitled) during interview with Los Angeles Times, she stated: "There's a purity to her. As driven as she is to find the 'get,' the next hot commodity, she also has a pure passion for art." Despite a very limited release, the film drew positive reviews. Roger Ebert remarked that Shelton "has the confidence and presence of a born comedienne", and writing for The New York Times, Stephen Holden stated that she "gives a bright screwball performance that recalls the frisky young Diane Keaton". Her final 2009 film release was the independent ensemble comedy Women in Trouble, in which she portrayed a flight attendant and one in a group of several women in Los Angeles whose their lives interconnect in the course of one day. Joe Neumaier for the New York Daily News considered the film to be a "forced, charmless multi-character [production]", but Tyler Foster of DVD Talk felt that Shelton made a "brief impact" in her role.

=== 2010s ===
Shelton reprised her Women in Trouble role for Elektra Luxx (2010), which Los Angeles Times described as "a rambunctious affection for women and appreciation for flamboyant production design". She next portrayed Deputy Judy Hicks in the Wes Craven slasher sequel Scream 4 (2011). Having previously auditioned for the role of Tatum Riley, played by Rose McGowan, in Scream (1996), she obtained the part of Judy Hicks after Lake Bell dropped out only four days before filming was scheduled to begin. The film made US$97 million globally and garnered largely mixed reviews from critics; Matthew Turner for View London remarked that Shelton turned in an "enjoyably weird performance".

In The Mighty Macs, an independent sports drama, Shelton reunited with Carla Gugino, taking on the role of Sister Sunday, a nun of Immaculata University and the assistant coach of Cathy Rush. The film was released in theaters in October 2011, more than three years after it was filmed, due to the difficulties of finding a distributor. Reviewer Nell Minow praised Shelton, writing that she "shows us how the sister’s faith supports her strength and integrity". She also had guest-roles in episodes of Harry's Law and Mad Men in 2011 and 2013, respectively.

Spanish filmmaker Francisco Lorite's short film Mediation, in which Shelton starred with Freddy Rodriguez as a couple whose "divorce mediation [...] spirals completely out of control", was screened in Los Angeles, as part of the 2014 NewFilmmakers Film Festival, where she was nominated for Best Performance in a Comedy. Shelton played the ill-fated sister of a woman tireless researching for the cure for breast cancer, alongside Samantha Morton and Helen Hunt, in Steven Bernstein's independent drama Decoding Annie Parker (2014), which was released for limited markets. The part of a doctor who successfully fertilized embryos in a dystopian future when women have stopped having children due to an infertility pandemic in the Lifetime television series The Lottery (also 2014) was Shelton's second leading role on a television series following Eleventh Hour. While Allison Keene of The Hollywood Reporter highlighted the series' "female lead" and focus on "a women’s issue", James Ponniewozik of Time criticized the decision to introduce Shelton's character as "a woman on the prowl for a baby daddy". The Lottery aired for one season.

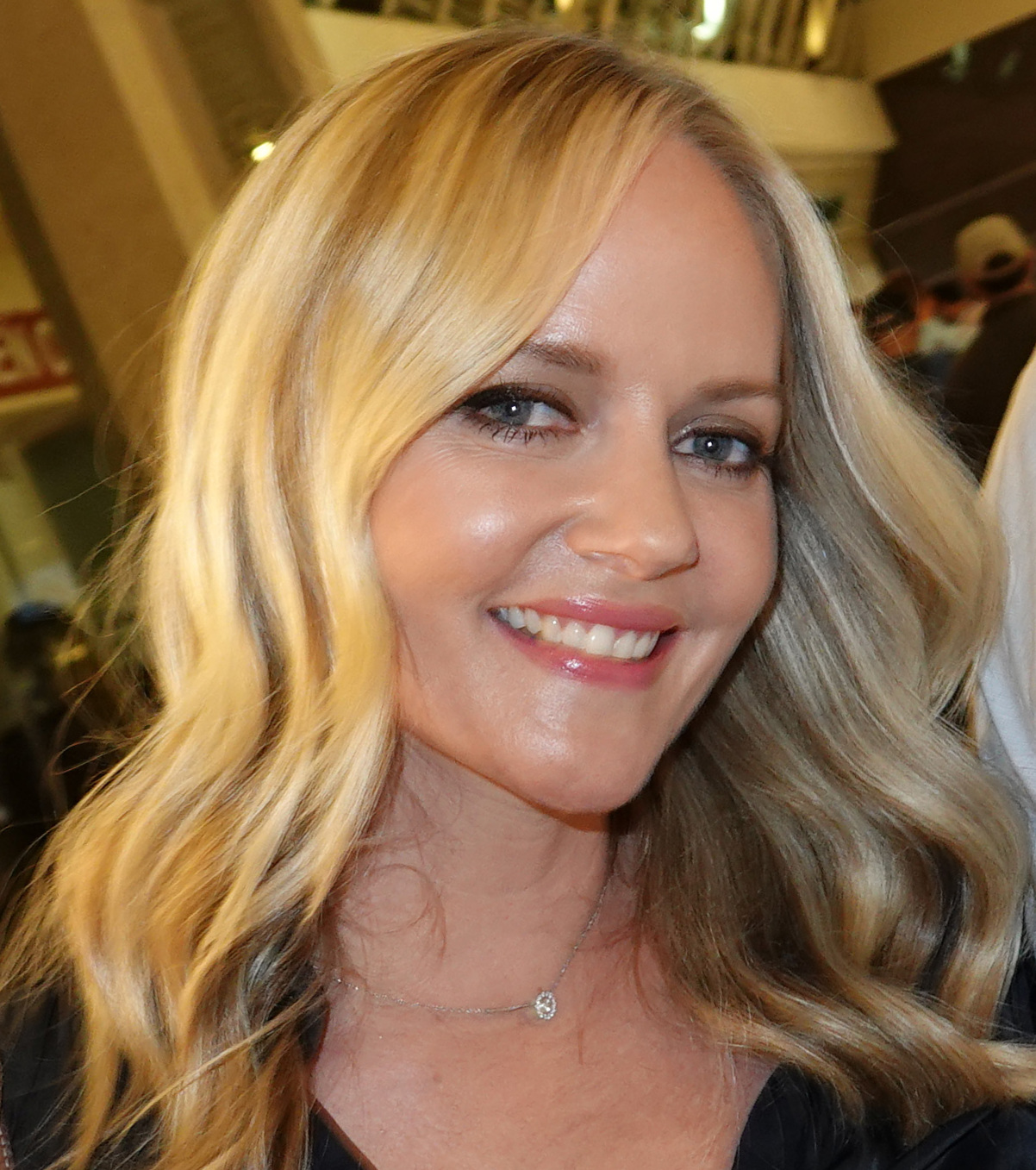
Shelton in 2018

Shelton played the wife of an FBI special agent, opposite Anthony Hopkins and Colin Farrell, in the psychological thriller Solace (2015). She next starred as one half of a couple on the verge of divorce in Heaven Sent (2016), which premiered as a Christmas film for Lifetime. The NBC musical drama series Rise (2018), inspired by the 2013 book Drama High by Michael Sokolove, featured Shelton as the wife of an English teacher. The production earned mixed reviews, and like Eleventh Hour and The Lottery, it was cancelled after one season. She also made a brief appearance as a scientist and astronaut in the science fiction monster film Rampage (2018), which made over US$428 million worldwide.

=== 2020s ===
In 2020, Shelton had a recurring arc as a woman manipulated by a bomber in the second season of Manhunt. Daniel Fienberg of The Hollywood Reporter praised her for adding "depth" to the story. She reprised her role of Judy Hicks in Matt Bettinelli-Olpin and Tyler Gillett's Scream (2022), the fifth installment in the Scream film series and the first in the franchise not to be directed by Wes Craven following his death in 2015. The film grossed over US$140 million globally. From 2022 to 2023, Shelton portrayed Emma Dutton in the Yellowstone spinoff 1923, which also featured Harrison Ford and Helen Mirren. In 2025, she played a three-episode role as a grieving mother in the first season of CBS's Matlock, opposite Kathy Bates.

== Personal life ==
Shelton met film producer Beau Flynn on the set of Bubble Boy in 2000 and married him in July 2001. They have two daughters.

== Filmography ==
=== Film ===
Year	Title	Role	Notes
1991	Grand Canyon	Amanda	
1993	The Sandlot	Wendy Peffercorn	
1994	Hercules in the Underworld	Iole	
1995	Nixon	Tricia Nixon Cox	
1997	Warriors of Virtue	Elysia	
1997	Trojan War	Brooke Kingsley	
1998	Pleasantville	Margaret Henderson	
1999	Never Been Kissed	Kristin	
1999	The Bachelor	Natalie Arden	
1999	Protect-O-Man	Paige Turner	
2000	Lured Innocence	Elsie Townsend	
2001	Sugar & Spice	Diane Weston	
2001	Valentine	Kate Davies	
2001	Bubble Boy	Chloe	
2001	On the Borderline	Nicky	
2002	Just a Kiss	Rebecca	
2003	Moving Alan	Melissa Kennard	
2003	Dallas 362	Amanda	
2003	Uptown Girls	Ingrid	
2003	Grand Theft Parsons	Susie	
2004	The Old Man and the Studio	Kaitlyn	Short film
2005	Don't Come Knocking	Starlet	
2005	Sin City	The Customer	
2006	American Dreamz	Jessica	
2006	Jesus, Mary and Joey	Mary O'Callahan	
2006	The Last Kiss	Arianna	
2007	Death Proof	Dakota Block	
2007	Planet Terror	Dakota Block	
2007	The Fifth Patient	Helen	
2008	W.	Fran	
2009	A Perfect Getaway	Cleo	
2009	Women in Trouble	Cora	
2009	(Untitled)	Madeleine Gray	
2009	The Mighty Macs	Sister Sunday	
2010	Elektra Luxx	Cora	
2011	Scream 4	Deputy Judy Hicks	
2013	Decoding Annie Parker	Joan Parker	
2014	Mediation	Victoria Lindo	Short film Nominated — Best Performance in a Comedy (NewFilmmakers Los Angeles)
2015	Solace	Laura Merriweather	
2018	Rampage	Kerry Atkins	
2022	Scream	Sheriff Judy Hicks	

=== Television ===
Year	Title	Role	Notes
1990	The Family Man	Heather	Episode: "Torn Between Two Brothers"
1992	Up to No Good	Denise Harmon	TV film
1992	Family Matters	Becky Sue	Episode: "Woman of the People"
1992	Bodies of Evidence	Julie Belmont	Episode: "The Edge"
1992	Camp Wilder	Jennifer	Episode: "Sophie's Birthday"
1992	Crossroads	Katie Stahl	Episode: "Freedom of the Road"
1992	Great Scott!	Allison	Episode: "Book Crook"
1993	In the Line of Duty: Ambush in Waco	Laura	TV film
1993	Angel Falls	Brandi Dare	
1994	Dead at 21	Keri Sullivan	Episode: "Love Minus Zero"
1994	McKenna	Heather	Episode: "Splendor in the McKenna Grass"
1994	A Friend to Die For	Jamie Hall	TV film
1994	Take Me Home Again	Lisa	TV film
1995	Cybill	Jan	Episode: "The Big Sleep-Over"
1996	When Friendship Kills	Jennifer Harnsberger	TV film
1998	Fantasy Island	Jane	Episode: "Pilot"
2004	Dark Shadows	Victoria Winters	Unsold TV pilot
2004	Karen Sisco	Molly Lucas	Episode: "Dog Day Sisco"
2005	American Dad!	Betsy White (voice)	Episode: "Deacon Stan, Jesus Man"
2008–2009	Eleventh Hour	Rachel Young	Main role
2011	Harry's Law	Tammy Benoit	Episode: "Bad to Worse"
2013	Mad Men	Kate	Episode: "To Have and to Hold"
2014	The Lottery	Alison Lennon	Main role
2016	Heaven Sent	Maire	TV film
2018	Rise	Gail Mazzuchelli	Main role
2019	Dirty John	Carrie	Episode: "Chivalry"
2020	Manhunt	Hannah Gray	3 episodes
2022–2023	1923	Emma Dutton	Recurring role
2024	Tracker	Erika Kennedy	Episode: "Mt. Shasta"
2025	Matlock	Lydia Reed	3 episodes
