= All Over Me (film) =

1997 film by Alex Sichel

- Home video release cover
- Directed by: Alex Sichel
- Written by: Sylvia Sichel
- Produced by: Dolly Hall
- Starring: Alison Folland; Tara Subkoff
- Cinematography: Joe DeSalvo
- Edited by: Sabine Hoffmann
- Music by: Leisha Hailey; Miki Navazio
- Production companies: Baldini Pictures; Medusa Pictures; Slam Pictures
- Distributed by: Fine Line Features
- Release dates: February 1997 (Berlin International Film Festival); April 25, 1997 (United States)
- Running time: 90 mins.
- Country: United States
- Language: English
- Box office: $150,646 (Domestic)

All Over Me is a 1997 American teen drama film directed by Alex Sichel and written by her sister, Sylvia Sichel. Alex Sichel received a grant from the Princess Grace Foundation to make a film about the riot grrrl music scene and then asked her sister to collaborate with her.

The soundtrack featured musicians and bands such as Ani DiFranco, Sleater-Kinney, Babes in Toyland and many more.

== Plot ==
This film focuses on Claude (Alison Folland), a tomboy teenage girl who lives with her divorced mother in Hell's Kitchen, New York City, and is the story of her sexual discovery and budding lesbianism during summer vacation. Claude's best friend is Ellen (Tara Subkoff). Her plan to start a band with Ellen is subverted when Ellen begins dating Mark (Cole Hauser).

Claude discovers that Luke (Pat Briggs), a gay musician who has just moved into her apartment building, has been stabbed to death in what might have been a hate crime. Ellen hints at the fact that she was there when Luke was killed, but Claude keeps her mouth shut in order to protect her. Claude then goes to a gay bar and meets Lucy (Leisha Hailey), a pink-haired guitarist who is playing in the house band. Claude goes to Lucy's apartment where they begin to engage in a romantic encounter, but Claude freaks out and leaves, returning to her apartment to find Ellen waiting for her. They have a fight which ends with Claude screaming that she would die without Ellen.

Claude goes out along with Ellen and Mark on one of their dates; Mark gives Ellen downers which make her violently ill. Claude brings her to the bathroom and forces her to vomit, and Ellen refers to Claude as her "Knight in Shining Armor." Mark is visibly furious but manages to contain himself. Claude leaves and goes to Lucy's apartment again, but leaves after a brief make-out session. On the way home, Claude is ambushed in the street by Mark, who questions her relationship with Ellen. Claude threatens to tell the police about Mark's possible involvement in Luke's death due in large part that she is worried that he is leading Ellen down a dark path.

Claude goes home to find Ellen waiting for her. Claude tells her that they need to tell the police about Mark, but Ellen says she would go to jail if they knew about her involvement. Claude says she would never let that happen. Claude kisses Ellen for the first time and tells her that she loves her. Ellen tells Claude not to say that for she is not interested in Claude romantically, and Claude leaves. The next day, Claude cleans out her room, removing all traces of Ellen. She goes to the police before work. Later, the police comes into her workplace and take Mark away for questioning. Ellen tells Claude that she hates her for ratting her boyfriend out to the police. Claude says that she knows, and that she's sorry but had to do it. Ellen ends her friendship with Claude. Claude then starts seeing Lucy and going out on their first date together.

== Cast ==
- Alison Folland as Claude
- Tara Subkoff as Ellen, Claude's best friend.
- Cole Hauser as Mark, Ellen's boyfriend.
- Wilson Cruz as Jesse, Claude's co-worker at the pizzeria
- Leisha Hailey as Lucy, a guitarist that Claude meets and starts dating.
- Pat Briggs as Luke, gay musician who befriends Claude and Jesse
- Ann Dowd as Anne, Claude's mother.
- Gene Canfield as Stewart, Anne's boyfriend.
- Shawn Hatosy as Gus
- Vincent Pastore as Don
- David Lee Russek as Dave

== Ratings and distribution ==
The MPAA gave All Over Me an R rating for sexuality and drug use involving teen girls, and for strong language. The film premiered at the 1997 Berlin International Film Festival where it played in the Panorama section. It went on to show at several festivals including the 1997 Turin International Gay and Lesbian Film Festival and the 1998 Lisbon Gay and Lesbian Film Festival. It opened in American theaters on April 25, 1997, distributed by Fine Line Features. It was released in Australian theaters on February 19, 1998. It was released onto Region 1 DVD on June 14, 2005, distributed by Image Entertainment. It was released on Region 2 DVD on April 8, 2002, distributed by Millivres Multimedia.

== Reception ==
=== Critical ===
Critical response to All Over Me was generally positive. Rotten Tomatoes gives it an 87% approval rating based on 31 reviews, with an average score of 7.3/10. The site's consensus reads: "All Over Me takes a serious, sensitive approach to teen lives and romantic relationships that are all too often ignored or misunderstood".

Critics were impressed with this directorial debut and described it as powerful and conspicuously well-made. They praised the Sichel sisters for telling a story of adolescence and friendship which is at once honest, realistic and authentic, while remaining subtle, subdued and compassionate. Emanuel Levy called it complex and interesting, and Marjorie Baumgarten called it a film for "riot grrrls of all ages". Janet Maslin of The New York Times praised it as a confident first feature but said that it has more style than substance. Its detractors included Don Willmot, who found it melodramatic, and E!, which described it as titillating but contrived; "a walk on the mild side".

Alison Folland was widely praised by critics for her performance as Claude. Emanuel Levy called her an instinctive actress who "dominates every frame of the picture". Janet Maslin said Folland brings a "wistful sincerity" to the role. Tara Subkoff was also praised for a performance compared by some to Rosanna Arquette. Not all the critics liked her portrayal of Ellen; E! called her "merely grating".

With its coming-of-age theme and exploration of teenage sexuality, All Over Me drew comparisons from critics to other films, in particular Larry Clark's Kids and Maria Maggenti's The Incredibly True Adventure of Two Girls in Love, both from 1995. Although similarities were noted, All Over Me was praised for its differences to these two films. E! called it gentler than Kids, and Muskewitz said All Over Me was less exploitative than that film. Emanual Levy described it as the far more interesting and complex of the two. Ron Wells said "thank god it's not Kids" and Bernstein said that "comparison misses the point". When comparing it to The Incredibly True Adventure of Two Girls in Love, Emanuel Levy called All Over Me "much more accomplished". SplicedWire called it " an ideal companion feature for Todd Solondz's Welcome to the Dollhouse, another female-centred coming-of-age film from the mid-1990s. LGBT publication The Advocate considered it to be an improvement upon Slaves to the Underground, a film also released in 1997 that focused on lesbianism and the 1990s alternative music scene.

=== Awards ===
All Over Me won the Teddy Award for Best Feature Film at the 1997 Berlin International Film Festival. It was nominated for the Grand Jury Prize at the 1997 Sundance Film Festival, the Open Palm Award at the 1997 Gotham Awards and the Outstanding Film (Limited Release) Award at the 1998 GLAAD Media Awards. Alison Folland was nominated for the Independent Spirit Award for Best Female Lead.

== Music ==
The film score for All Over me was composed by Miki Navazio. The soundtrack to the film was released on the TVT label on April 29, 1997. It features songs from several indie and riot grrl musicians interspersed with parts of Navazio's score.

All Over Me: Original Motion Picture Soundtrack

Soundtrack album
- Released: April 29, 1997
- Label: TVT
- Producers: Bill Coleman, Alex Sichel

Professional ratings
Review scores
Source	Rating
Allmusic	4/5 stars

=== Track listing ===
1. "Hello" (Lori Barbero, Kat Bjelland, Maureen Herman) performed by Babes in Toyland
2. "Ellen and Claude Jammin" (Miki Navazio)
3. "Shy" performed by Ani Difranco
4. "Hole In The Ground" (Mary Timony) performed by Helium
5. "I Wanna Be Your Joey Ramone" (Corin Tucker, Lora McFarlane) performed by Sleater-Kinney
6. "Game Song" (Tuscadero) performed by Tuscadero
7. "Jackie Blue" (Larry Lee, Steve Cash) performed by The Ozark Mountain Daredevils
8. "Claude Sees Ellen And Mark" (Navazio)
9. "Squeezebox Days" (Leisha Hailey) performed by The Murmurs
10. "Dragon Lady" (Carla Bozulich, Daniel Keenan, Kevin Fitzgerald, William Tutton) performed by Geraldine Fibbers
11. "Dynamite" (Alison Pipitone) performed by Pipitone
12. "Empty Glasses" (Kim Deal) performed by The Amps
13. "Descent" (Remy Zero) performed by Remy Zero
14. "6 a.m. Jullander Shere" (Tjinder Singh) performed by Cornershop
15. "The Kiss" (Navazio)
16. "Dimming Soul" (Michelle Malone) performed by Malone
17. "Pissing in a River" (Patti Smith, Ivan Kral) performed by Patti Smith Group
18. "Superglider" (Isabel Monteiro, Daron Robinson) performed by Drugstore
19. "Finale" (Navazio)
20. "Something's Burning" (12 Rounds) performed by 12 Rounds

== See also ==
- List of LGBT films directed by women
