= Sugar & Spice =

2001 film by Francine McDougall

- Theatrical release poster
- Directed by: Francine McDougall
- Written by: Mandy Nelson
- Produced by: Wendy Finerman
- Starring: Marla Sokoloff; Marley Shelton; Melissa George; Mena Suvari; Rachel Blanchard; James Marsden
- Cinematography: Robert Brinkmann
- Edited by: Sloane Klevin
- Music by: Mark Mothersbaugh
- Production companies: New Line Cinema; Wendy Finerman Productions
- Distributed by: New Line Cinema
- Release date: January 26, 2001
- Running time: 81 minutes
- Country: United States
- Language: English
- Budget: $11 million
- Box office: $16.9 million

Sugar & Spice is a 2001 American teen dark comedy film directed by Francine McDougall, written by Lona Williams under the alias of "Mandy Nelson", and starring Marla Sokoloff, Marley Shelton, Melissa George, Mena Suvari, Rachel Blanchard, and James Marsden. It tells the story of a group of high school cheerleaders who conspire and commit armed robbery when one of them becomes pregnant and is desperate for money.

Sugar & Spice was released by New Line Cinema on January 26, 2001. The film received mixed reviews from critics. It grossed a worldwide total of $16.9 million against a budget of $11 million.

== Plot ==
Lisa Janusch, head of the B-squad cheerleaders at Abraham Lincoln High School, recalls how Diane Weston, the kind and popular head of the school's A-squad, became pregnant by the school's star quarterback, Jack Bartlett.

After announcing the pregnancy to their parents, the two are kicked out of their respective homes and have to find an apartment of their own. Jack initially has issues keeping a job, but eventually gets hired at a video rental store. In spite of their issues with the rent money, Jack and Diane try as hard as they can to survive while going to school at the same time. Lisa, who has a bitter one-sided rivalry with Diane, occasionally runs into Jack at the rental store. She is interested in winning Jack's heart while being annoyed by the male cheerleader Bruce.

After struggling with the rent and anticipating the financial hardship of supporting a family, Diane and her four cheerleader squadmates/best friends Kansas Hill, Cleo Miller, Lucy Whitmore, and Hannah Wald plan the perfect bank robbery. They promise each other not to tell Jack about their plan, due to his inability to lie to others.

The squad watches heist films to learn how to rob banks and Kansas visits her mother at the women's penitentiary for tips on where to find weaponry. Following Mrs. Hill's advice, the girls visit a bug exterminator named Hank "The Terminator" Rogers who sells illegal arms and ammo. After failing to negotiate on prices, Hank offers to give them the guns for free on the condition that they befriend his socially awkward daughter Fern and put her on their squad.

The squad reluctantly accepts Fern into their circle, and they all begin rehearsing the robbery, as well as their choreography for the winter ball. During winter break, they order doll masks to hide their identities. Lucy backs out of the heist because she receives a scholarship to Harvard. At Christmas, Diane receives an engagement ring from Jack. She then learns he sold his GTO in order to buy her the ring. The squad is forced to obtain a new getaway vehicle, prompting Fern to volunteer her father's work van with bad brakes.

At their first robbery at a supermarket, Lucy returns to the group having decided to help them after all. Lisa happens to be in the store at the time of the robbery and notices that they perform cheerleader stunts in order to cover up the security cameras. The squad robs the bank and come close to shooting a customer after one of the guns discharges by mistake. They make off with armloads of cash and honor their success after burning their costumes. The robbery is widely reported in the media, becoming a juggernaut. Neither Diane nor her friends expect Lisa to suspect them until they are confronted by her and the B-Squad in the high school cafeteria followed by the FBI.

Diane and her friends are arrested and need an alibi, which Lisa agrees to supply them with in return for being promoted to captain of the A-squad. Diane agrees in part because she is approaching her third trimester (and therefore can no longer do the meticulous physical activity which cheerleading requires). The group reluctantly appreciate the decision.

A postscript reveals that Hannah started a successful horse-riding school. Fern became a supermodel. Kansas got her mother acquitted. Lucy graduated from Harvard. Cleo starred in Scream 8. Lisa and Bruce are happily married. Diane tells Jack she "won the lottery" and they had twins. Jack wins his senatorial campaign. Diane's parents helped establish the "Diane Bartlett Scholarship Fund for Pregnant Cheerleaders".

== Cast ==
- Marla Sokoloff as Lisa "The Informer" Janusch, the spiteful and jealous head cheerleader of Abraham Lincoln High School's B-Squad. She serves as the narrator of the film recapping what she knows to the FBI.
- Marley Shelton as Diane "The Mastermind" Weston, the kindhearted and popular head cheerleader of Abraham Lincoln High School's A-Squad who becomes pregnant
- Melissa George as Cleo "The Stalker" Miller, a boy crazy member of Abraham Lincoln High School's A-Squad.
- Mena Suvari as Kansas "The Rebel" Hill, a bad girl member of Abraham Lincoln High School's A-Squad.
- Rachel Blanchard as Hannah "The Virgin" Wald, an uber-Christian member of Abraham Lincoln High School's A-Squad.
- James Marsden as John "Jack" Bartlett, a quarterback at Abraham Lincoln High School's A-Squad who gets Diane pregnant and later works at a video rental store to make ends meet.
- Sara Marsh as Lucy "The Brain" Whitman, a nerdy member of Abraham Lincoln High School's A-Squad.
- W. Earl Brown as Hank "The Terminator" Rogers, a bug exterminator who sells weapons to Diane's group.
- Alexandra Holden as Fern "The Terminator" Rogers, the socially awkward daughter of Hank who assists Diane and her friends in their robbery.
- Sean Young as Mrs. Hill, the mother of Kansas who is currently incarcerated for an unspecified crime that she didn't commit.
- Adam Busch as a geeky guy
- Jake Hoffman as Ted
- Nate Maher as Chris
- David Belenky as Bruce, a male cheerleader at Abraham Lincoln High School that Lisa is annoyed with.
- Wiley Harker as Principal Smith, the principal of Abraham Lincoln High School.
- Steven Ray Rentfrow as Dennis Weston, the father of Diane.
- Kirsten Frantzich as Dee Dee Weston, the mother of Diane.
- Christopher Denton as Ed Bartlett, the father of Jack.
- Jan Puffer as Edna Bartlett, the mother of Jack.
- Jeremy Kent Jackson and Jamison Haase as Football Players
- Kurt Loder as himself, he reports on the robberies during the MTV News Break.
- Jerry Springer as himself, he was hosting an episode of his show where he talks about transvestites wanting to become pregnant.

While having been talked about a lot in the film, Conan O'Brien makes a photographic cameo during the film's postscript where Cleo was shown to have met him.

== Production ==
The film was directed by Australian filmmaker Francine McDougall, who had earlier collaborated with Marla Sokoloff on a 1997 short titled The Date, which revolved around a girl suffering from flatulence while on a date. One of the film's cast members, Melissa George, was also from Australia, and she had begun doing US acting roles the year Sugar & Spice was shot.

It was loosely based on a 1999 series of robberies perpetrated by four teenage girls from the Kingwood area of Houston, Texas. Sokoloff stated, "It's not the same, of course, yet I'm not sure if Sugar & Spice would have been made if that hadn't happened."

The film had a lengthy post-production, and changed so much from the original that Lona Williams had her name removed from the film and the writing was instead credited to the pseudonym Mandy Nelson.

Casting for the film coincided with the casting of another film about cheerleaders, Bring It On. 17 years later, actress Gabrielle Union claimed that she and many of her Bring It On co-stars auditioned for Sugar & Spice, with the latter seen as the more desirable project. "Bring It On was the cheerleading movie that was the consolation prize because you didn't get the cheerleading movie that you wanted", she said. The closing credits use the song "Let's Rob a Bank" by the band Size 14. Despite the title, it wasn't recorded specifically for the film, having originally appeared on their 1997 self-titled album.

== Reception ==
=== Box office ===
The film opened at number five at the North American box office, earning $5,891,176 USD in its opening weekend, short of its $11 million budget but grossed $13,305,101 in the domestic box office and $16,908,947 worldwide.

=== Critical response ===
On Rotten Tomatoes it has an approval rating of 30% based on reviews from 74 critics, with the site's consensus "Though this cheerleader comedy has an intriguing premise, it's too empty-headed and saddled with too many lame jokes to live up to it. Also, some critics say the movie is irresponsible in its depiction of teens and guns." On Metacritic the film has a weighted average score of 48% based on reviews from 17 critics. Audiences polled by CinemaScore gave the film an average grade of "D+" on an A+ to F scale.

Roger Ebert gave the film 3 out of 4 stars, and wrote: "It's not a great high school movie like Election, but it's alive and risky and saucy." Brendan Kelly of Variety gave the film a positive review, calling it "[q]uite a smart little film with a surprising satirical edge." Lisa Schwarzbaum of Entertainment Weekly gave the film a B grade, and wrote: "It's fun in its raunchy unwieldiness."

Peter Travers at Rolling Stone compared the film unfavorably to Bring It On, saying it was "not in the same clever league" and is critical that Suvari is underused, and that the gags are "scattershot at best". Bruce Westbrook of the Houston Chronicle wrote, "The actors didn't seem worried by taking a comic approach to teen crime."

== Soundtrack ==
- "Girls" by Lefty
- "Rock and Roll Part 2" by Gary Glitter
- "Blitzkrieg Bop" by The Nutley Brass
- "Glockenpop" by Spiderbait
- "Critical Nature" by The Dragonflies
- "Ready to Go" by Republica
- "Girl Power" by Shampoo
- "Bohemian Like You" by The Dandy Warhols
- "Watch Her Now" by Mark Mothersbaugh
- "She's So Huge" by The Flys
- "Feliz Navidad" by José Feliciano
- "Shazam" by Spiderbait
- "Cannonball" by The Breeders
- "News Flash" by Shampoo
- "B'cos We Rock" by Brassy
- "Pistolero" by Juno Reactor
- "American Girl" by Cindy Alexander
- "Let's Rob a Bank" by Size 14
