= Just a Kiss (film) =

- Theatrical release poster
- Directed by: Fisher Stevens
- Written by: Patrick Breen
- Based on: Marking by Patrick Breen
- Produced by: John M. Penotti; Dolly Hall; Tim Williams
- Starring: Patrick Breen; Zoe Caldwell; Sarita Choudhury; Taye Diggs; Ron Eldard; Kyra Sedgwick; Marley Shelton; Marisa Tomei
- Cinematography: Terry Stacey
- Edited by: Gary Levy
- Music by: Sean Dinsmore
- Production company: GreeneStreet Films
- Distributed by: Paramount Classics (Select territories); Lakeshore International (International)
- Release dates: June 15, 2002 (Seattle); September 27, 2002 (United States)
- Running time: 89 minutes
- Country: United States
- Language: English
- Box office: $64,389

Just a Kiss is a 2002 dark comedy film and the directorial debut of Fisher Stevens. Patrick Breen wrote the screenplay adapted from his own off-Broadway play entitled Marking and co-starred in the film. The story follows a disastrous chain of events that results from a kiss between two unfaithful people. The film contains a mixture of live action scenes with rotoscoped animation. Just a Kiss was filmed in New York City.

== Plot ==
Dag is a successful director of television commercials who lives with his girlfriend, Halley. Dag, however, has a serious case of wandering eye and is given to frequent flings with other women. Halley tries to turn a blind eye to Dag's infidelity, but when she discovers Dag had a one-night stand with Rebecca, a beautiful but troubled ballet dancer who is dating Dag's close friend Peter, she decides things have gone too far. To add to her feeling of betrayal, she hears a message on the answering machine for Dag from another woman (Paula) looking to meet up. Halley breaks up with Dag; soon after, she makes the acquaintance of Andre, a handsome and well-mannered classical musician. Andre, however, is married to Colleen, a woman with exotic sexual tastes who meets up with Peter, now suddenly without a girlfriend, on an airline flight. Peter and Colleen have sex in the plane’s bathroom. Just before the plane lands, Peter makes a cell phone call, which causes interference with the signals from the plane’s control tower and results in the plane crashing. The plane breaks in half and lands a few feet from the front gate. While all travelers in the first-class section survive, everyone in the economy class section is burned beyond recognition. An ambulance runs over Colleen, killing her. Meanwhile, Peter's very angry confrontation with Dag attracts the attention of Paula, a mysterious, alluring woman who has taken a decidedly carnal interest in Peter. Paula first gets involved with Dag in a sexual encounter that injures him and leads to his death. She next sets her sights on Peter, but he rejects her as he is mourning Colleen. Hurt by his rejection, Paula plots to kill Peter next. Andre, Peter and Rebecca mourn their respective lovers. However, as Paula makes her way through Peter's daisy-chained circle of friends, events take an even stranger turn as her new acquaintances begin to die in great numbers.

At Rebecca's funeral, Peter asks "Can we take it back from you can flat-out dance?" The film rewinds to when Dag goes to Rebecca's room and Rebecca propositions Dag again. This time, he refuses and leaves. Peter is with Rebecca and Dag is with Halley in their building and Rebecca confesses her coming onto Dag. Peter is furious and breaks up with Rebecca (but they go back to her place to have sex one last time). Halley feels betrayed and kisses Andre while he's playing music. Collen sees this and throws flowers at him. Dag proposes as he feels he is giving up his serial philandering ways. He bumps into Paula, who seems angry. Dag and Halley walk off and Paula fantasizes about killing them.

== Cast ==
- Ron Eldard as Dag
- Kyra Sedgwick as Halley
- Marisa Tomei as Paula
- Marley Shelton as Rebecca
- Taye Diggs as Andre
- Sarita Choudhury as Colleen
- Patrick Breen as Peter
- Zoe Caldwell as Jessica
- Peter Dinklage as Dink

== Release ==
Paramount Classics acquired the film for distribution in 2001. Just a Kiss premiered at the Seattle International Film Festival on June 15, 2002 and was given a limited release on September 27, 2002.

== Reception ==
On review aggregate website Rotten Tomatoes, Just a Kiss has an approval rating of 19% based on 59 reviews. The site’s critics consensus reads, "With annoying characters and gimmicks, the romantic comedy Just a Kiss is neither touching nor funny." Metacritic, which uses a weighted average, assigned the film a score of 39 out of 100, based on 21 critics, indicating "generally unfavorable" reviews.

Reviewers criticized the film’s structure, the mix of varying film genres and styles, and the animated sequences, which many felt added little to the story. Of the animation, Roger Ebert said the technique was better executed in the film Waking Life, which was released a year prior. Ebert wrote, "I can imagine a way in which this could work, in a Roger Rabbit-type movie that moves in and out of the cartoon dimension. But it doesn't work here because it is manifestly and distractingly only a stunt. And the whole movie, in various ways, has the same problem: It's all surface, without an entry point into whatever lurks beneath. The characters, dialogue, personal styles and adventures are all mannerisms. The actors are merely carriers of the director's contrivances."

Ken Eisner of Variety gave a positive review, saying it "mixes swell ensemble acting with eye-popping animation for a witch’s brew of good sex, bad timing and very funny dialogue." Eisner singled out Tomei as the ensemble's standout and concluded that while Stevens' "eclectic, sometimes willfully silly attack definitely won’t please everyone, those who buy it will find much tender feeling for human frailty beneath the pixilated surface." TV Guide wrote, "veterans of the dating wars will smirk uneasily at the film's nightmare versions of everyday sex-in-the-city misadventures." Stephen Holden of The New York Times was similarly positive, praising "its surreal sense of humor and technological finish." Holden welcomed the animation and wrote, "bursts of feeling are often animated in bright jungle colors that underscore the characters' emotional heat while lending their feelings a cartoonish abstraction. The effect is distancing because it illustrates the ultimate banality of passion." However, Holden commented the film "only half-succeeds in making its surreal game of mixed doubles transcend soap-opera spoof. After a while the endless complaining begins to wear thin, and the more surreal the story becomes, the more it pulls away from characters, who seem more and more like pieces in a board game."

Writing for The A.V. Club, Scott Tobias said "the further [Stevens and Breen] push the material into outright absurdity, the stranger and funnier it gets", but also opined, "Too bad Breen's script—a Rube Goldberg contraption with seven principal characters bouncing off each other—takes far too long in getting to the punchlines." Tobias also critiqued the film's portrayal of women, noting that "the men may be fallible, but the women are psychotics, with a roster that includes one split personality, one vengeful stalker, and two suicidal narcissists with the scars on their wrists to prove it." Both Holden and Ebert singled out Zoe Caldwell's performance as Rebecca's mother, Jessica. Holden wrote, "As Jessica imperiously ticks off a list of famous former lovers, the movie finds its only note of genuine erotic despair."

== Awards ==
In 2002, the film won the Prize of the City of Setúbal at the Festróia - Tróia International Film Festival. It was also nominated for the Open Palm Award for outstanding directorial debut at the Gotham Awards.
