= Pat Briggs =

American singer (died 2022)

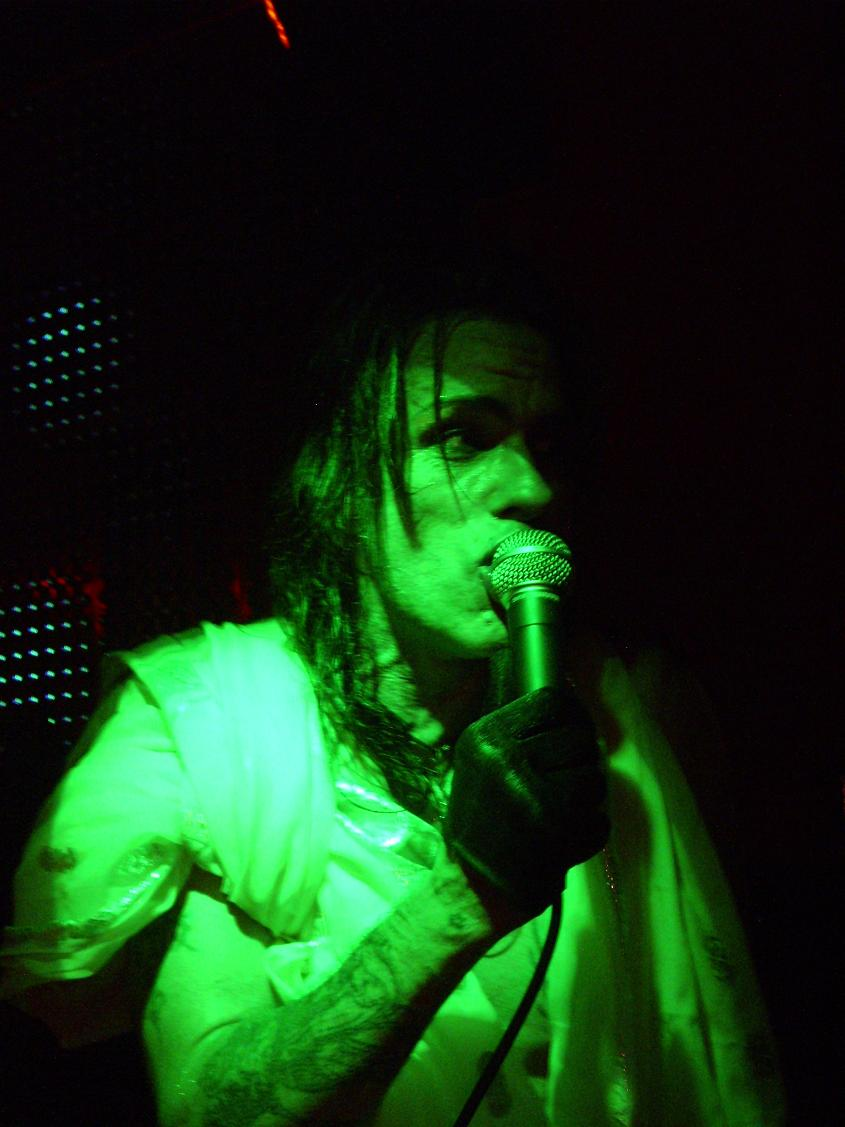
- Briggs performing with Psychotica in 2009

Background information
- Born: Patrick Briggs; June 16, 1964; Burbank, California, United States
- Died: December 27, 2022 (aged 58) Palm Springs, California
- Genres: Industrial
- Occupations: Actor; singer
- Years active: 1994–2022
- Labels: American Recordings, Ventrue Entertainment, Zero Hour Records, Art Monkey Records, Toxic Shock Records, Psychotica Records
- Website: www.facebook.com/patrickbriggsmusic

Patrick Briggs (June 16, 1964 – December 27, 2022) was an American singer and lead vocalist of glam rock band Psychotica. He played the role of gay rock musician Luke in the 1997 film All Over Me. In addition, he appeared in the New York Theatre Workshop version of Rent, in the role of Tom Collins.

== Career ==
Briggs started performing when he was eight when he went into a little theater in Burbank, California. He mistakenly had an audition for The Seven Year Itch as he was the only child in the theater, he won the role of Little Ricky.

His first music group was a short-lived glam rock band formed for The Limelight, consisting of Tracii Guns, Johnny B. Frank from Kingdom Come and Rikki Rockett (of Poison) on drums, and then Briggs as the backup singer. He then became a go-go dancer at the Limelight.

In the 1980s, Briggs moved to New York City and started working at the Cat Club.

In 1994, Briggs was the manager of a small New York City nightclub called Don Hill's; to help attract clients to the club, Briggs teamed with bassist and Don Hill bartender Tommy Salmorin to found Psychotica.

Briggs was instrumental in the creation of a theme night at a club in Atlanta called 'Glitterdome'. It was a night of sex, drag, and rock and roll. Briggs was typically dressed as his alter-ego, Torment, and would sing live with the Glitterdome band. It also featured other local drag queens from Atlanta, as well as other nationally known stars.

Briggs also had created the night in Los Angeles at the El Rey theater called Club Makeup, which the E! channel did a special documentary on. He also was the creator of Squeezebox in New York City. Squeezebox! The Movie premiered at the Tribeca Film Festival on April 25, 2008.

Briggs also sang and toured with a band called the Impotent Sea Snakes for a brief time.

In late 2001, a close friend of Briggs', Carrie Hamilton, was diagnosed with lung cancer. Briggs left Atlanta and returned to Los Angeles to be by her side. He spent almost the entire year in Los Angeles with her and her family supporting her through her illness. In January 2002, upon Hamilton's urging, he returned to do another Glitterdome show in Atlanta. On January 20, 2002, immediately after his performance, he learned that Hamilton had died. Briggs returned to Los Angeles and took part in a six-page long interview in the November issue of Popular 1 magazine. The article includes never before seen pictures of Briggs. The interview was done in July 2008, only a few weeks before the news of the reunion of Psychotica, who signed with Toxic Shock Records.

Briggs died in Palm Springs, California, on December 27, 2022, aged 58. The cause of death was revealed in his obituary to be from lung cancer complicated by RSV.
