= Drop Dead Gorgeous (film) =

1999 American black comedy film

- Theatrical release poster
- Directed by: Michael Patrick Jann
- Written by: Lona Williams
- Produced by: Gavin Polone; Judy Hofflund
- Starring: Kirstie Alley; Ellen Barkin; Kirsten Dunst; Denise Richards
- Cinematography: Michael Spiller
- Edited by: Janice Hampton
- Music by: Mark Mothersbaugh
- Production companies: Capella Films; KC Medien
- Distributed by: New Line Cinema (United States); Capella International (International)
- Release date: July 23, 1999
- Running time: 97 minutes
- Country: United States
- Language: English
- Budget: $15 million
- Box office: $10.6 million

Drop Dead Gorgeous is a 1999 American satirical mockumentary black comedy film directed by Michael Patrick Jann and written by Lona Williams. It stars Kirstie Alley, Ellen Barkin, Kirsten Dunst and Denise Richards, along with Brittany Murphy, Allison Janney and Amy Adams in her feature film debut. The film follows a small town beauty pageant and the fierce, deadly lengths the contestants will take to secure the crown.

Drop Dead Gorgeous was released by New Line Cinema on July 23, 1999. Though the film was a box-office flop and critical reviews were mixed to unfavorable, it has gained a following over time and has come to be regarded as a cult film.

== Plot ==
In 1995, the small, conservative town of Mount Rose, Minnesota, is preparing for their annual local qualifying pageant for the national Sarah Rose Cosmetics American Teen Princess Pageant. A film crew is in town to document the pageant and its lead-up. One of the interviewees is 17-year-old Amber Atkins, who signs up for the pageant in the hopes of winning a college scholarship and following in the footsteps of her idol, Diane Sawyer.

Among the other contestants are Rebecca "Becky" Leeman, the daughter of a bigoted furniture retailer, thought to be the richest man in town. Becky's mother, Gladys, is the head of the pageant organizing committee and a former winner. Because of the business connections between the Leemans' furniture store and the pageant judges, many fear the contest will be rigged. In the days leading up to the pageant, many odd events occur around town, such as contestant Tammy Curry being killed when her threshing machine explodes, and the death of a boy Becky liked who was interested in Amber, which is ruled as a hunting accident. Amber considers dropping out when her mother Annette's trailer explodes but remains in the competition to make her mother proud. At the dress rehearsal, a stage light knocks out contestant Janelle Betz and renders her deaf.

On the night of the pageant, Amber's dance costume disappears. She accuses Becky of stealing it and they have a fight backstage. Pageant choreographer Chloris Klinghagen gives Amber a new costume but Gladys says she cannot perform as the new costume was not approved weeks in advance. Amber's fellow contestant, Lisa Swenson, takes pity on her and drops out to give Amber her costume. Amber is able to perform her tap dance number and receives a standing ovation. For her performance, Becky sings "Can't Take My Eyes Off You" while dancing with a life-sized Jesus doll on a crucifix, which amuses and horrifies the audience.

The pageant announces the winners: cheerleader Leslie Miller is second runner-up, Amber is first runner-up, and Becky wins. During Becky's victory parade the next day, she is killed in a freak accident when her elaborate swan float bursts into flames and explodes. A grief-stricken Gladys flies into a blind rage, admitting to being responsible for murdering and sabotaging the other contestants, and is immediately arrested. Amber is crowned the new pageant winner. At the state competition, Amber wins the title by default after the other contestants contract food poisoning. As a prize, she receives an all-expenses-paid trip to the national pageant in Alabama. Upon arrival, however, she and the other state winners are devastated to find that Sarah Rose Cosmetics was shut down by the federal government for tax evasion, rendering the national pageant permanently canceled as a result. This sends all the contestants (except Amber) into a rage-fueled rampage where they vandalize the company's former headquarters.

A few years later, Gladys finishes second in a prison beauty pageant and soon escapes. She returns to Mount Rose and becomes involved in a police standoff at a supermarket, declaring her intent to take revenge on Amber. During the six-hour standoff, a television reporter at the scene is hit by a stray bullet while live on-air. Amber quickly picks up the microphone and takes over to report the story, impressing the news station with her poise and confidence. Amber becomes co-anchor of the evening news for Minneapolis–St. Paul WAZB-TV, thus fulfilling her dream of possibly becoming the next Diane Sawyer.

== Cast ==
- Kirstie Alley as Gladys Leeman
- Ellen Barkin as Annette Atkins
- Kirsten Dunst as Amber Atkins
- Denise Richards as Rebecca Ann "Becky" Leeman
- Sam McMurray as Lester Leeman
- Allison Janney as Loretta
- Mindy Sterling as Iris Clark
- Matt Malloy as John Dough, judge #1
- Will Sasso as Hank Vilmes
- Brittany Murphy as Lisa Swenson
- Mo Gaffney as Terry Macy, state pageant
- Nora Dunn as Colleen Douglas, state pageant
- Seiko Matsuda (miscredited as Seiko Matsudo) as Tina/Seiko Howard
- Richard Narita as Mr. Howard
- Patti Yasutake as Mrs. Howard
- Amy Adams as Leslie Miller
- Laurie Sinclair as Michelle Johnson
- Shannon Nelson as Tess Weinhaus
- Tara Redepenning as Molly Howard
- Sarah Stewart as Jenelle Betz
- Alexandra Holden as Mary Johanson
- Brooke Elise Bushman as Tammy Curry
- Michael McShane as Harold Vilmes, judge #2
- Lona Williams as Jean Kangas, judge #3
- John T. Olson as Pat
- Adam West as himself
- Mary Gillis as Chloris Klinghagen
- Amanda Detmer as Miss Minneapolis
- Thomas Lennon as voice of documentarian
- Samantha Harris as Miss Burnsville

== Background ==
The movie is set in the fictional town of Mount Rose, Minnesota, which in turn is based on Rosemount where writer Lona Williams grew up. The film was originally titled "Dairy Queens" but was changed for legal reasons.

The characters in the movie all sport exaggerated, over-the-top parodies of Minnesota accents. The film was shot throughout the Carver County area, mainly in Waconia, Minnesota, although names of real Minnesota communities were shown on the sashes of contestants later in the movie.

News reporter Diane Sawyer is mentioned throughout the film as Kirsten Dunst's character Amber Atkins's idol, as Sawyer was a former beauty pageant winner. Amber's other idols include her beauty pageant mother who raised her alone in a trailer park, and the previous year's pageant winner who is hospitalized for anorexia. Competing in the beauty pageant for a scholarship is juxtaposed against the opportunities that boys have in leaving Mount Rose, such as hockey scholarships and prison.

Two Melissa Manchester songs are featured in the film as songs used in the talent portion by contestants. Mary lip-syncs "Don't Cry Out Loud", while Jenelle sings and signs "Through the Eyes of Love". Fanfare for the Common Man is played to introduce the parade for the rigged competition and the plight of Hank.

== Soundtrack ==
Drop Dead Gorgeous: Motion Picture Soundtrack

Soundtrack album by Various Artists
- Released: July 13, 1999
- Genre: Soundtrack
- Label: Sire

Professional ratings
Review scores
Source	Rating
Allmusic	3/5 stars

No.	Title	Performer	Length
1.	"400 Calories" (dialogue)	Alexandra Holden (Mary Johanson)	0:21
2.	"Number One"	Lifeboy	2:56
3.	"She"	Sunday Suit	2:50
4.	"Two Months Late" (dialogue)	Amy Adams (Leslie Miller) and Thomas Lennon (the Documentarian)	0:19
5.	"Love Is All Around" (Theme from The Mary Tyler Moore Show)	Joan Jett	2:20
6.	"Pressure Man"	The Feelers	4:29
7.	"FAQ" (dialogue)	Michael McShane & Will Sasso (Harold & Hank Vilmes)	0:10
8.	"Young Americans" (David Bowie cover)	Everything	3:40
9.	"Beautiful Dreamer"	Mandy Barnett	3:42
10.	"Saturday Night's Alright for Fighting"	Elton John	4:50
11.	"Spit It Out" (dialogue)	Allison Janney (Loretta) and Kirsten Dunst (Amber Atkins)	0:17
12.	"Girl That's Hip"	Tim Carroll	3:13
13.	"Lost Picasso"	Hot Sauce Johnson	3:16
14.	"Boat Show" (dialogue)	Kirstie Alley (Gladys Leeman)	0:09
15.	"Ballad of a Teenage Queen"	Dale Watson	2:26
16.	"Counting"	Skirt	2:30
17.	"Watch You Sleep"	The Nevers	5:23
18.	"Confessions"	Mark Mothersbaugh	2:37
19.	"Beauty Pageant Biz" (dialogue)	Nora Dunn (Colleen Douglas)	0:22
20.	"Devil's Triangle"	Primitive Radio Gods	2:06
21.	"9mm" (dialogue)	Denise Richards (Rebecca Ann Leeman)	0:16
22.	"Can't Take My Eyes Off You"	Denise Richards (Rebecca Ann Leeman) and Mark Mothersbaugh	2:02
23.	"Last Laugh" (dialogue)	Brittany Murphy (Lisa Swenson)	0:21

== Release ==
The movie was originally scheduled to be released on April 30, 1999 before being pushed to July 23 of that year.

== Reception ==
=== Box office ===
Drop Dead Gorgeous grossed $10.6 million in the United States and Canada, against a budget of $15 million.

=== Critical response ===
The film received mixed to unfavorable reviews. On the review aggregator website Rotten Tomatoes, 47% of 73 critics' reviews are positive, with an average rating of 5.5/10. The website's consensus reads: "Its dark humor sometimes hits, but mostly misses the target." Metacritic, which uses a weighted average, assigned the film a score of 28 out of 100, based on 28 critics, indicating "generally unfavorable" reviews.

Allison Janney and Denise Richards in particular received praise for their performances from a number of critics. Dennis Harvey of Variety called the film "a fitfully amusing satire that would have gained a lot of mileage from just a tad more subtlety." Harvey said the writing is not sophisticated enough to pull off some of the jokes without being condescending. He otherwise praised the pacing, the performances, and the clever visual casting. Roger Ebert liked the idea of the film, but wrote that the script failed to translate to the screen and was not funny enough, due to subtle miscalculations of production and performance. Jeff Vice of the Deseret News criticized the film for being derivative, comparing it to the 1975 pageant comedy Smile, the 1996 film Fargo, and the mockumentary Waiting for Guffman. Entertainment Weekly gave the film a D grade, and compared the film unfavorably to Smile and The Positively True Adventures of the Alleged Texas Cheerleader-Murdering Mom.

== Legacy ==
The film has gained new fans with time and is regarded as a cult film. In 2011, Allison Janney stated that she is approached by more fans of this film than for her Emmy-winning tenure on The West Wing.

In July 2019, coinciding with the 20th anniversary of its release, Drop Dead Gorgeous was released for streaming for the first time on Hulu, which was "met with a host of celebratory tweets, particularly among women and queer people, who have long recognized it as a cult classic", according to The Independent's Adam White. It attracted retrospective praise from the likes of The Independent, The Guardian, Teen Vogue, The New Yorker and E! News. The New Yorker's Jia Tolentino credited the movie's "transformation" from a flop to a "venerated artifact of Y2K camp" to its slow discovery on VHS and DVD by teenage girls who identified with its truthfulness and particular brand of dark humor. Tolentino summed up the movie as "...offensive, for sure—completely awful, really, and possibly deadly. It is also irreplaceable, hilarious, surprisingly tender, and lavishly, magnificently absurd." The Guardian praised the film's "vicious indecency", describing it as "...trashy, wonderful, endlessly quotable, and...20 years ahead of its time."

Adam White further praised the movie's radical departure from lighthearted teen movies of the late 1990s, stating that it "was made for a generation of freaks and outsiders, whose ambitions, oddities, queerness and poverty were otherwise ignored by anything similarly mainstream or funny." He added that it was "acidic and truthful about beauty, class and ambition, satirised all-American moralism and blew up Denise Richards, then fresh from Wild Things, as she rode a giant paper-maché swan." Alex Zaragoza of Teen Vogue echoed other reviews in praising the movie's appeal to outsiders and misfits, and departing from the teen rom-com tropes of other movies released that year like 10 Things I Hate About You and She's All That. Zaragoza stated that the girls in Drop Dead Gorgeous "don't yearn to land their respective dream boy...they're too busy trying not to get capped by a crazed mother–daughter duo... and striving to break out of the confines of their small town." He further described it as a "wild, absurdly portrayed story that's fundamentally about small-town struggles and overcoming the adversity of being born into a class that lacks opportunities to ultimately earn the life you've dreamed of for yourself. It's unabashed weirdness and mockumentary-style filmmaking made it an immediate cult classic".
