= Buz (drummer) =

American drummer

- Born: Frank Altimare
- Genres: Rock
- Occupation: Drummer
- Instrument: Drums
- Years active: 1989 - present

Buz a.k.a. Frank Altimare is a drummer. He was the drummer in '90s band Psychotica. Prior to joining Psychotica, Buz was the drummer for LA Punk band Youth Gone Mad. Buz appeared on the Youth Gone Mad 1994 album Day Job.

In the early 2000s Buz played on material by NY band The Bastard Kings of Rock.
