= Aaron A. Brooks =

American rock musician, drummer, composer, and producer

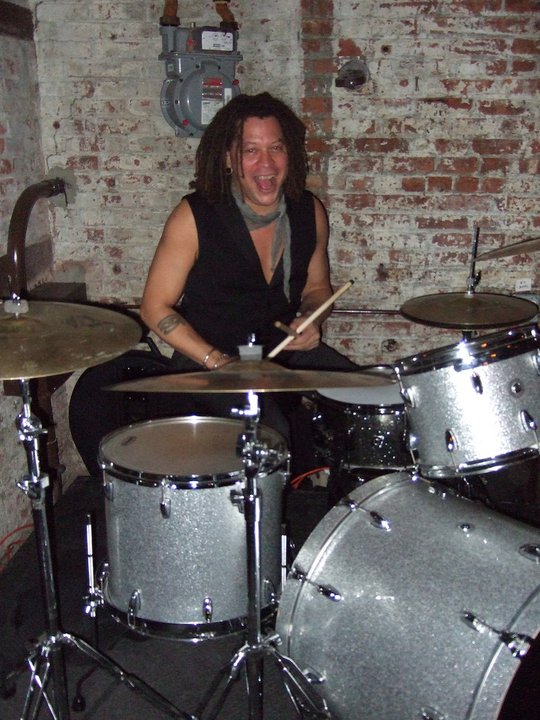
- Aaron in 2011, NYC

Background information
- Also known as: Lion of Bushwick
- Born: Aaron Anthony Jean Vladimir Brooks; January 24, 1964 (age 62); San Francisco, California, United States
- Origin: San Francisco
- Genres: Alternative rock, rock, hard rock, punk rock, Electronic pop, Electronica
- Occupations: Musician, Drummer, Composer, Producer, Percussionist, Production Manager, Tour Manager
- Instruments: Drums, Piano, Percussion
- Years active: 1984–present
- Labels: Gowanus Sound Initiative, Eros and Aphrodite Music, Life on Mars, LTD., Capitol Records, Hollywood Records/Intercord Records
- Website: http://aaronabrooks.wixsite.com/aaronabrooks

Aaron A. Brooks (born January 24, 1964, San Francisco, California), also known as Aaron Kinsley-Brooks, is an American rock musician, drummer, producer and composer. He co-founded The Little Death with Moby, Laura Dawn and Daron Murphy. He is a founding member of the American alternative rock band, The Mars Bonfire. Aaron also plays or has played drums for the electronic pop band Leisure Cruise; Grammy nominated electro-pop chanteuse Angela McCluskey (of Télépopmusik and Wild Colonials); Grammy award-winning producer/songwriter Mark Hudson; Emmy award-winning actress and singer Jackie Cruz; Grammy award-winning artist Moby; Singer/songwriter and progressive political activist Laura Dawn; Grammy award-winning bassist/songwriter and rock musician Duff McKagen of Guns N' Roses; Circle of Soul; Erin Evermore; Grammy award-winning pianist and songwriter A.J. Croce; Grammy-nominated singer/songwriter Lana Del Rey; Writer, radio host, progressive political comic and guitarist/singer Jamie Kilstein and his band The Agenda.

== Family life and education ==
At an early age, Aaron was taught to play the drums by John Bonham and Sonny Payne. His father is multiple, Grammy Award winning jazz saxophonist, composer, and arranger Frank Foster. His mother is the 1960s and 1970s rock publicist, Christine "Sunshine" Brooks (Bill Graham, The Who, Led Zeppelin, The Rolling Stones, Cream, The Grateful Dead, Jefferson Airplane, Santana). Aaron is married to the Canadian model, interior decorator, and lifestyle-lista Sarah Kinsley-Brooks. Between them, they have four grown children: Griffin, Cassandra, Michelle, and Andrew; and a Yorkie pup named Poppy Love. Aaron is an avid ocean conservationist and PADI Master Scuba Diver. Aaron is based in New York City, Bushwick, Brooklyn and Hollywood, FL.

== Career highlights ==
In 2011, Aaron composed an original score for Billy Bates, an independent film by Jennifer DeLia and Julie Pacino. The film premiered at the 2012–2013 Cannes, Toronto, Tribeca, Berlinale and Sundance Film Festival.

He confounded The Mars Bonfire with singer/songwriter Mark Wynegar, bassist Dean Perry and guitarist Jay Shepard.

He is currently the drummer for the electro-pop band Leisure Cruise, fronted by Dave Hodge and Leah Siegel.

He is currently the drummer for Grammy-nominated electro-pop singer Angela McCluskey.

He is currently the drummer for Emmy-winning pop singer Jackie Cuz.

He is currently the drummer for writer, radio host, progressive political comic, and guitarist/singer Jamie Kilstein.

He is currently a co-founder and drummer for The Little Death, fronted by Moby with Laura Dawn and Daron Murphy.

He was a touring and session drummer for Grammy-winning artist Lana Del Rey

He was a touring and recording drummer for Grammy-winning, electro-pop artist Moby.

He was the touring and session drummer for Extasy Records recording artist Laura Dawn.

He was the touring drummer for Chrysalis/Tigerstar Records recording artist Erin Evermore.

He was the touring drummer for Grammy-winning rock artist, songwriter, and bassist Duff McKagen of Guns N' Roses

He was the recording and touring drummer for the 90's rock band Circle Of Soul

He was a touring drummer for Grammy-winning producer/songwriter Mark Hudson

He was a founding member and the drummer for The Wallflowers, aka The Bootheels

=== Collaborations ===
Since 2006 Aaron has played drums and collaborated with recording artist, musician and pop icon Moby and The Little Death, along with Laura Dawn and Daron Murphy. The Little Death released their debut album "The Little Death" in 2010 while performing sold-out shows, including performances with Moby at The 2011 NMS Grammy's After Party, SXSW, The Sundance Film Festival, The Box, The Guggenheim Museum and at Radio City Music Hall with Sir Paul McCartney.

Aaron has also served as a touring/session drummer for Grammy-winning musical artist Lana Del Ray and NY-based musical artists Queen V, Joey DeGraw, Joan Jett & The Blackhearts drummer Thommy Price, and singer/songwriter Galen Ayers

From 1996 to 2006 Aaron was playing, recording and touring with Laura Dawn, supporting her debut album "Believer" while opening for The Calling on their breakthrough 2001 US tour. He performed and recorded with Dawn's early other alt-rock band Fluffer who toured as support for The Melvins, Ben Folds Five, and Train.

During that time, Aaron recorded and toured internationally with the Mike Chapman produced electro-pop band Erin Evermore. In support of Evermore's album "Babyphetamine", they were the opening act for Duran Duran on the U.S. leg of their "Pop Life" 2000–2001 world tour.

Aaron was the touring drummer for a solo Duff McKagen of Guns N' Roses, touring alongside The Scorpions on their 1993–95 world tour. During this time, he performed with Duff on the first live simulcast of MTV'S Headbangers Ball and shot two videos for the singles "I Still Love You" and "Believe in Me". All the while, he recorded, performed, played and collaborated with Caron Bernstein, Trace Devai, The Immigrants/Edith Grove, MTV VJ Kari Wuhrer and the earliest incarnation of The Wallflowers nicknamed The Bootheels, with Jakob Dylan (son of Bob Dylan), and Luther Russell.

Aaron started his musical career in the 80's rock scene of Los Angeles, drumming with his band, Circle of Soul. Soon after, the band was signed to a major label (Capitol/Hollywood Records/Intercord) and embarked on a world tour in support of their Toby Wright, Waddy Wachtel and Frankie Sullivan-produced debut and second albums Hands of Faith and One Man's Poison. Circle of Soul performed as openers for The Smashing Pumpkins, Lynyrd Skynyrd, Winger, and Alice in Chains. They received steady video airplay on MTV and radio airplay with their single "Shattered Faith" reaching #30 on Billboard's "TOP 100" rock chart and #10 on Billboards Europe's "Top 100" rock chart.

== Discography 1990–2016 ==
- Leisure Cruise-Dust-Last Gang Records (2016) (Single) Producer: Dave Hodge, Liam O'Neil
- Lola Johnson – Damaged Goods – Radian Records (2012), Producers: Andrew Felus & Lola Johnson
- BonusStrike – Vivien – Independent (2011), Producer: John Pahmer
- The Little Death – The Little Death – Gowanus Records (2009), Producer: The Little Death
- Moby and Deborah Harry – New York City Remix for Songs For Tibet – EMI Records (2008), Producer, MOBY
- AngieScreams – The Revelations Of Arthur Lynn – RCA (2008), Producer: Carlos Alomar
- Jesse Gage – Goodnight Marlena – Independent (2008), Producer: Tony Bruno
- BonusStrike – BonusStrike – Independent (2007), Producer: Michael Lee
- Joe Chiofalo – Orange & Black – Sony Records (2008), Producer: Joe Chiofalo
- The Shandys – When Your Alone – Pork Pie Records (2007), Producers: The Shandy's
- The Smackdarts – Electricity – Independent (2006), Producers: The Smackdarts & Bernie Worrell
- Yowza – In My Head – Eros & Aphrodite Records (2006), Producers: Jimi K. Bones and Yowza
- Laura Dawn – Believer – Sony/Extasy Records (2002), Producers: Ted Nicely, Shimon Speigal & Yoshiki
- Erin Evermore – Babyphetamine – Tiger Star/Chrysalis Records (1999), Producer: Mike Chapman
- Erin Evermore – Girls Love Sex – Tiger Star Records/Chrysalis Records (1999), Producer: Mike Chapman
- K5 – Liquid – Vital Records (1996), Producer: David Beal with Larry Mullen Jr.
- Fluffer – Fluffer – Independent (1996), Producers: Jason Corsaro, Aaron Comess & John Eaton
- The New York No Stars – B-Sides – Cleopatra Records (1997), Producers – Anthony Esposito & Marco Olivieri
- Duff McKagen – Believe In Me – Uzi Suicide/Geffen Records (1993), Producers: Duff McKagen & Jim Mitchell
- Circle Of Soul – One Mans Poison – Hollywood/Intercord Records (1993), Producers: Ed Roynesdal, Michael Frondelli & COS
- The Immigrants/Edith Grove – Edith Grove – Beggar's Banquet Records (1993), Producers: Michael Ashton & Brian Foraker
- Circle Of Soul – Hands Of Faith – Capitol Records/Hollywood Records (1990), Producers: Waddy Wachtel, Frankie Sullivan, Dave Jerdan, Toby Wright and COS

== Video 1990–2016 ==
- Jackie Cruz – Como Y Flor- Vivala Launch (2015)
- Leisure Cruise – Mother-Last Gang Records (2015)
- Leisure Cruise – Crime Tip – Last Gang Records (2015)
- Leisure Cruise – The Getaway – Last Gang Records (2014)
- Leisure Cruise – Believer-The Wild Honey Pie Buzz Sessions at Area 51 (LIVE) (2013)
- Leisure Cruise – The Wild Honey Pie Buzz Sessions at Area 51 (LIVE) (2013)
- Moby – Sessions at KCRW (LIVE) (2009)
- Moby with Paul McCartney, Ringo Starr, Sheryl Crow, Donovan, Eddie Vedder and Ben Harper & The Furious 5- Change Begins Within: A Benefit for The David Lynch Foundation at Radio City Music Hall" (LIVE) (2009)
- Joey DeGraw – Another Mistake – The Today Show – Los Angeles/CBS (LIVE) (2009)
- Joey DeGraw – Another Mistake – The Today Show – Memphis/CBS (LIVE) (2009)
- The Little Death with Donovan – Change Begins Within: A Benefit for The David Lynch Foundation at Vedic City (LIVE) (2009)
- The Little Death – Some Of That/That Bone – Fox TV/Fearless TV (LIVE) (2010)
- Erin Evermore – Girls Love Sex MTV (2001)
- Duff McKagen – I Love You – MTV Worldwide – Uzi Suicide/Geffen Records (1994)
- Duff McKagen – Believe In Me – MTV Worldwide – Uzi Suicide/Geffen Records (1994)
- Duff McKagen – First simulcast of Headbangers Ball with Riki Rachtman (MTV Worldwide LIVE) (1994)
- Circle Of Soul – Strung Out On Love – MTV/VH1 Worldwide (1993)
- Circle Of Soul with Queen – Queen – Live on the Queen Mary" (1991)
- Circle Of Soul – Shattered Faith – MTV/VH1 Worldwide (1990)

== Equipment ==
Aaron is endorsed by multiple companies, including Dunnett Classic Drums, Creation Drums, Dakine and Gorilla Ears.

=== Drums ===
Creation Drums Maple Custom Series in Vintage Silver Sparkle Lacquer with Chrome Hardware.

- 12x12" Concert tom
- 14x14" Concert tom
- 16x16" Floor Tom
- 18x24" Bass Drum
- 7x13" Tama Custom Snare Drum
- 6 1/2x14 Dunnett Classic Drums Steel Snare Drum

=== Electronic Drums ===
- Roland SPD-SX Drum Pad
- Roland V-Drums Acoustic Design VAD507 Electronic Drum Set
- Roland RT Triggers
- Simmons Octopads

=== Cymbals ===
Zildjian

- 14" A Custom Master Sound Hi-Hats
- 19" A Custom Crash
- 18" A Custom Crash
- 17" A Custom Crash
- 16" A Custom Crash
- 21" Sweet Ride

=== Sticks ===
Vic Firth

- American Classic Rock Nylon Tip

=== Percussion ===
Latin Percussion

- Congas
- Cowbell
- Tambourine
- Shakers

=== Drumheads ===
Evans

- Coated E2 (on Toms)
- Clear EMAD (on Bass)

Remo

- Coated Ambassadors (on Toms)
- Coated Emperor X Black Dot (on Snare)
- Clear EMAD (on Bass)

=== Hardware ===
Drum Workshop

- 9000 Series and Pacific 8000 Series Hardware

=== Monitors ===
Gorilla Ears

- Gorilla GX-3b in Ear Monitors

== Production and Media Career ==
Aaron also works as an executive producer, producer, production manager, tour manager, and stage manager of music, film, video, concerts, and live events with his and his wife's production company Fleurs & The Lion, LLC. Currently, he works for JVKE (Production, Tour & Stage Manager), Faouzia (Production, Tour & Stage Manager), and Meshell Ndegeocello (Tour & Stage Manager). Aaron has also worked with Janelle Monae: Dirty Computer World Tour 2019-2022 (Stage Manager), Chromeo: Funk Yourself World Tour 2023 (Production, Tour, and Stage Manager), and Lauv: All For Nothing World Tour 2022 (Stage Manager). He also works as a stage manager for Atlanta-based music festivals One Music Festival, Candler Park Music Festival, Sweetwater 420 Festival and Big Homecoming Music Festival. During his production management career, he has worked with his artists at most of the major international music festivals, including: Coachella Valley Music and Arts Festival, Lollapalooza, Something In The Water, Corona Capital, Made In America, Jazzfest, ACL Fest, North Sea Jazz Festival, Fuji Rock Festival, Austin City Limits Music Festival, Governors Ball, Roskilde Festival, Rolling Loud Festival, Electric Forest Festival, Pitchfork Music Festival, Primavera Sound Barcelona, Osheaga Music and Arts Festival, South By Southwest, Glastonbury Festival, Tomorrowland Festival, and Montreux Jazz Festival. Aaron also works as a freelance short form video, print and commercial video line producer, executive producer, producer, associate producer and unit production manager for Art Not War, Jodi Jones Studio. and his own production company, Lion Of Bushwick Studios. He contributed to Art Not War garnering 8 Pollie Awards and 7 Reed Awards for best political media of 2012–2013, and Jodi Jones Studio winning two Silver Cannes Lion Awards.
