= Luther Russell =

American musician (born 1970)

Luther Russell (born November 30, 1970) is an American musician who has been recording since 1991. He is the grandson of songwriter Bob Russell and the grandnephew of songwriter Bud Green.

== Career ==
At 17, Russell formed his first band called The Bootheels with Jakob Dylan, the son of Bob Dylan, later a member of the Wallflowers. The Bootheels also included drummer Aaron A. Brooks.

He was the lead singer/songwriter of the band, The Freewheelers, who made two albums for DGC Records and American Recordings Company, respectively.

He went solo, starting with "Lowdown World" (1997), "Down At Kit's" (1999), and "Spare Change" (2001) all recorded while living in Portland, Oregon. It was also in the northwest where Russell produced many independent records by such acclaimed artists as Richmond Fontaine and Fernando. Since moving back to his hometown of Los Angeles he has released his fourth solo record titled Repair, which was produced by Ethan Johns (Kings of Leon, The Jayhawks, and Ryan Adams). Russell and Johns also co-produced the debut album of singer Sarabeth Tucek.

Russell has worked with The Relationship featuring Brian Bell of Weezer, co-producing their albums and latest single. After producing albums and singles between 2007 and 2010 by artists including Noah And The Whale, Folks, Horse Stories, and many more, Russell released the critically acclaimed double-album, The Invisible Audience (2011). He formed Those Pretty Wrongs with Jody Stephens of Big Star. Their debut 7" was released in 2015 on Burger Records. Their debut LP came out on May 13, 2016 on the Ardent Music label.

Russell has traveled and performed extensively and shared the stage with acts such as Arthur Lee, Johnny Cash, Tom Petty, Etta James, Los Lobos, and Wilco.

== Discography ==
=== The Freewheelers ===
- The Freewheelers (DGC, 1991),
- The Freewheelers Play Bob Russell (Promo LP, 1993),
- Waitin' For George (American Recordings, 1996).

=== Solo ===
- Lowdown World (Highland, 1997)
- Down At Kit's (Cravedog, 1999)
- Spare Change (In Music We Trust, 2001)
- Repair (2007)
- "Good Music b/w Sidekick Reverb" (single) 2009
- Motorbike EP (2010)
- The Invisible Audience (2011)
- Medium Cool, (Fluff & Gravy, 2019)
- ”Happiness For Beginners”, 2025
