= (Untitled) (2009 film) =

- Directed by: Jonathan Parker
- Written by: Catherine DiNapoli; Jonathan Parker
- Starring: Adam Goldberg; Marley Shelton; Eion Bailey; Vinnie Jones
- Cinematography: Svetlana Cvetko
- Edited by: Keiko Deguchi
- Music by: David Lang
- Production company: Parker Film Company
- Distributed by: Samuel Goldwyn Films
- Release date: October 23, 2009
- Running time: 96 minutes
- Country: United States
- Language: English
- Box office: $230,600

(Untitled) is a 2009 American comedy film directed and written by Jonathan Parker, co-written by Catherine DiNapoli, and starring Adam Goldberg, Marley Shelton, Eion Bailey, and Vinnie Jones. The film was released on October 23, 2009 in the United States.

== Plot ==
Set in the artsy Chelsea, this satirical film centers on a young bohemian avant-garde composer Adrian, who becomes involved with a trendy New York art gallery owner, Madeleine. Adrian is a composer who makes music by breaking glass and kicking metal buckets. In contrast to Adrian is his brother Josh, a successful painter who happens to bring Madeline to one of his brother's concerts. Madeleine is immediately drawn to Adrian's work and invites him to perform at her gallery and into her bedroom. Eventually, Josh discovers the secret relationship between Madeleine and Adrian, and the fact that Madeleine has been using Josh's paintings, which have commercial appeal, to keep the gallery running while it features more avant-garde work.

== Cast ==
- Adam Goldberg as Adrian Jacobs, a young bohemian composer
- Marley Shelton as Madeleine Gray, a trendy New York art gallery owner
- Eion Bailey as Josh Jacobs, Adrian's brother
- Lucy Punch as The Clarinet
- Vinnie Jones as Ray Barko
- Zak Orth as Porter Canby
- Michael Panes as Grant
- Janet Carroll as Helen Finkelstein

== Director ==
Jonathan Parker's debut film Bartleby (2001), an updated retelling of the classic Herman Melville tale "Bartleby, the Scrivener", was nominated for the Grand Prize at the Deauville Film Festival and was selected to be the opening night film of New York's New Directors/New Films Festival. A musician in his youth, Parker is also a collector of the San Francisco school of abstract expressionism, using many of his experiences in both worlds as a basis for (Untitled).

== Reception ==
=== Reviews ===
The film received generally mixed reviews from critics. The review aggregator Rotten Tomatoes reported that 64% of critics have given the film a positive review based on 39 reviews, with an average rating of 5.9/10. The site's critics consensus reads, "This satire on the art world is at times both clever and shallow, but its top-notch cast generates plenty of goodwill." On Metacritic, the film has a weighted average score of 58 out of 100 based on 19 critics, indicating "mixed or average" reviews. Lisa Schwarzbaum of Entertainment Weekly wrote "The whole cast is museum quality, music and the performances are pitch-perfect in their dissonance. Gary Goldstein of Los Angeles Times called the film "Ace in the best movie satires, there's a solid core of truth Informing director Jonathan Parker's (Untitled), which takes on the New York art and music worlds smart and funny in one swoop." Stephen Holden of The New York Times wrote, "If (Untitled) shrewdly hedges its bets about the value of it all, it is ultimately on the side of experimental music and art and their champions, no matter how eccentric. For that alone this brave little movie deserves an audience." The film also received bad reviews like that of Kevin B. Lee Time Out New York in which he wrote "(Untitled) 's onslaught of self-indulgent bohos and art-vs.-commerce clichés are as ersatz as their objects of scorn."

=== Box office ===
The film premiered in the United States on October 23. It opened in theaters and grossed in its first weekend $18,002.
