= Lona Williams =

Television producer, writer and actress

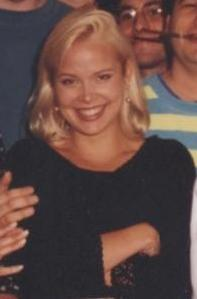
- Williams in 1992
- Born: September 26, 1966 (age 59); Rosemount, Minnesota, U.S.
- Occupations: Producer, writer, actress
- Years active: 1991–present

Lona Williams (born September 26, 1966) is an American television producer, writer, and actress.

== Early life and education ==
Williams was raised in Rosemount, Minnesota, where her father, Les, was a middle school math teacher. Williams participated in a number of beauty pageants as a child and was crowned Minnesota's Junior Miss in 1985, before becoming the runner up in the year's America's Junior Miss, winning a $10,000 scholarship. She graduated from Rosemount High School shortly thereafter.

Williams attended the University of Minnesota and after she took a screen-writing course there, her teacher encouraged her to move to California to find work.

== Career ==
After working as an assistant on one show, Jerry Belson at The Tracey Ullman Show, helped her get a job as a writing assistant on The Simpsons. She occasionally provided voices for the show, including that of Amber Dempsey, a single-episode character from "Lisa the Beauty Queen". She noted: "I really was only a typist for the show. But by working on the script, I learned how the scripts were put together. I would go to work and type all day, and come home and work on my spec scripts for The Simpsons and Roseanne."

Bruce Helford hired Williams as a writer on the short-lived Someone Like Me before in 1995 signing her up as a writer and producer on The Drew Carey Show. She stayed for three seasons and wrote the screenplay Dairy Queens which was retitled and released in 1999 as Drop Dead Gorgeous. She also wrote the original script for the 2001 film Sugar & Spice (on which she is credited under the pseudonym Mandy Nelson). She co-wrote the script of Scouts Guide to the Zombie Apocalypse.

== Filmography ==
=== Writing ===
==== Film ====
Year	Title	Notes
1999	Drop Dead Gorgeous	Also actor and executive producer
2001	Sugar & Spice	written under pseudonym Mandy Nelson
2004	Shark Tale	Additional dialogue
2015	Scouts Guide to the Zombie Apocalypse	Story

==== Television ====
Year	Title	Notes
1994	Hardball	2 episodes
1995	Bless This House	Episode: "If It Ain't Broke, Break It"
1995–1999	The Drew Carey Show	7 episodes; also producer and story editor
2002	In My Opinion	Television film
