= Aristotle Dreher =

American songwriter

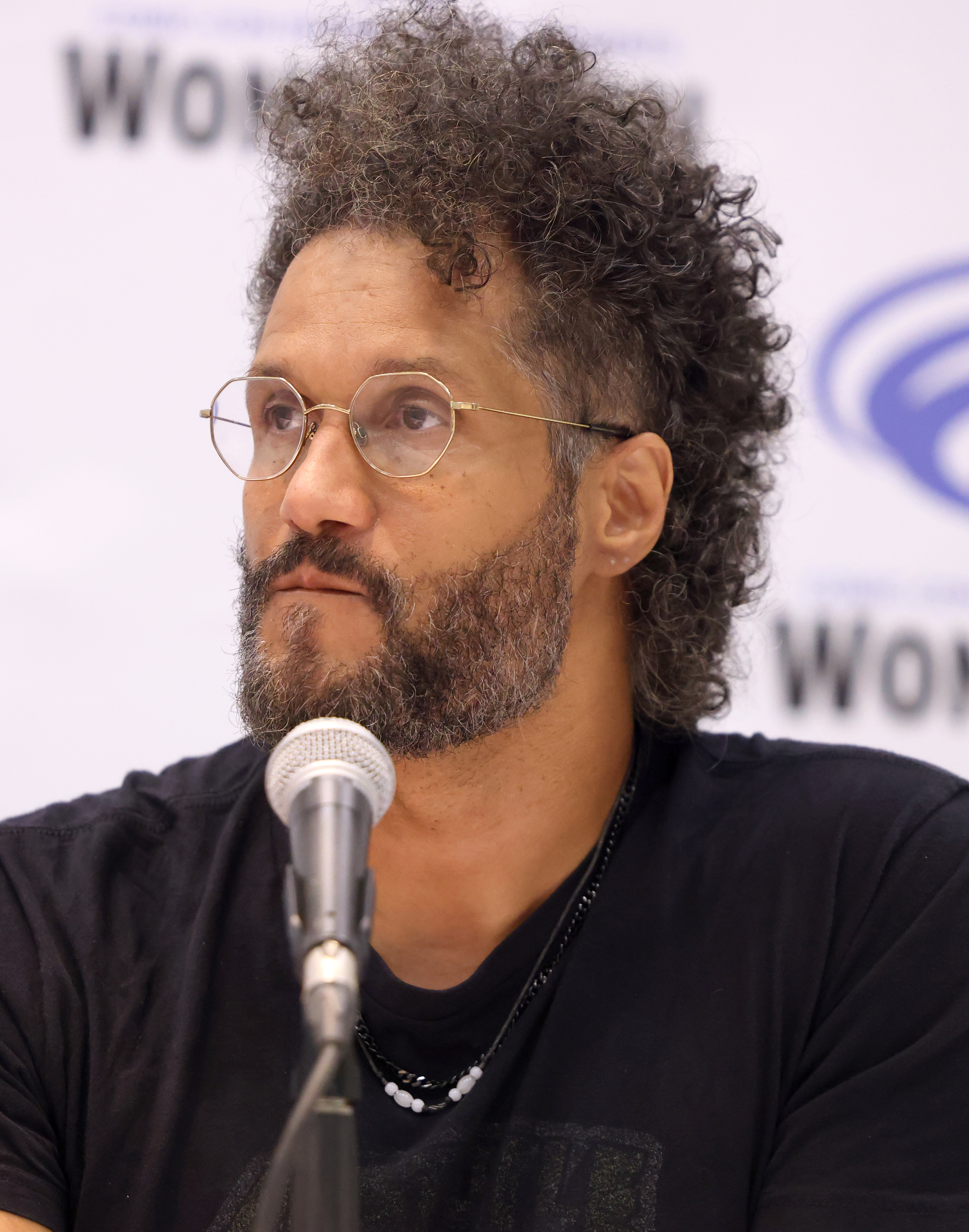
- Dreher in 2026

Background information
- Origin: United States
- Occupations: Singer, musician, artist, filmmaker, actor
- Instruments: Vocals; bass; guitar; piano; drums
- Years active: 2000–present

Aristotle Dreher is an American songwriter/musician from Bay Shore, New York. He is known as a founding member and bass player for the band Vaeda. He has also played bass for the bands Cage 9, and The Bastard Kings of Rock.

In addition to being a musician, Dreher is also a visual artist, filmmaker, and actor.
