= Laura Dawn =

American singer-songwriter

Laura Dawn is an American political activist, filmmaker and singer-songwriter. She was the cultural director for MoveOn.org from 2003 to 2011 and was named the organization's national creative director in 2007. In 2011 she co-founded social justice creative agency & production group ART NOT WAR, where she is CEO & Chief Creative.

== Musical work ==
In 2001, Laura Dawn released her first album Believer on Extasy International, an offshoot of Japanese label Extasy Records. The label folded while she was working on her second album, which was never completed. She was the featured vocalist on Moby's platinum selling album Hotel, and she toured the world with him for nine months in 2005. Her current music project, "The Little Death", is a collaboration of original songs co-written and performed with Moby, musician/composer Daron Murphy and drummer/composer Aaron A. Brooks. The music is inspired by vintage blues, film noir and 1960s psychedelic rock.

== MoveOn ==
Laura Dawn was the founding Creative and Cultural Director for MoveOn.org, overseeing all National Media Strategies, artist and cultural work, and producing all of MoveOn's media from 2004 to 2012. Laura created and directed an in-house creative agency and production company for all MoveOn Media.

In 2004, Dawn co-conceived and co-created the Bush in 30 Seconds ad contest, co-organized the online contest and national media campaign, and produced Bush in 30 Seconds LIVE. She has created national campaigns and organized artists, musicians, and filmmakers extensively for MoveOn and all MoveOn PAC projects, such as the Bake Sale for Democracy, the Fahrenheit 9/11 Campaign, the Virtual Garage Sale, the 50 Million Women Count media campaign, the MoveOn CD with Barsuk Records, the Kerry Kit, the Vote for Change Tour and, most notably, the 10 Weeks: Don't Get Mad, Get Even! ad campaign and live event.

Dawn has since spearheaded MoveOn's creative collaborations between the entertainment and political worlds, working with artists such as Oliver Stone, John Cusack, Doug Liman, Shepard Fairey, and, most recently, collaborating with actors Will Ferrell, Jon Hamm, and Heather Graham in support of the Public Health Insurance Option. She also co-produced (along with Shepard Fairey, OBEY Giant, and EMGPR) the Manifest Hope project, a series of galleries that united established visual artists with grassroots artists in support of the Obama presidential campaign.

Awarded the Paul Wellstone Citizen Leadership Award of 2004 for the 2004 Staff of MoveOn.org, Dawn has three political ads in the Museum of the Moving Image, and again broke new ground in 2010 by writing and producing the first wholly interactive GOTV video starring Olivia Wilde.

== Hurricane Katrina ==
In 2006, Dawn compiled and edited the book It Takes a Nation: How Strangers Became Family in the Wake of Hurricane Katrina, the story of MoveOn.org Civic Action's Hurricane Housing program, featuring a foreword by Barack Obama. Using the innovative online organizing techniques that MoveOn.org is famous for, MoveOn Civic Action members housed over 30,000 evacuees in the wake of Hurricane Katrina.

== Film ==
In 2008, Dawn produced the documentary feature film The End of America, the film version of Naomi Wolf's book of the same title. In 2009, she was featured in the documentary MoveOn: The Movie, a film that charted the growth and influence of MoveOn.org from 1998 to 2008. In 2010, Dawn made her acting debut in Oliver Stone's Wall Street: Money Never Sleeps as the co-worker of the character Winnie, played by Carey Mulligan. Winnie was based in part on Dawn's work as an activist and Mulligan shadowed her for a few months prior to filming.

Dawn began her work as a director of PSAs, political ads, and short documentaries while at MoveOn and continued into her work with ART NOT WAR. Laura Dawn won 11 Pollies, winning the coveted "Best in Show" Pollie Award for 2012 Ad of the Year for her expose on child trafficking, "Backpage.com’. Over the past 20 years, Laura has been producer, director and creative director for over 700 media pieces, produced two documentary features, and directed/produced a short documentary, "Dangerous Curves" on the first transgender sprint car driver, selected in 2016 as an official selection of the DOC NYC film festival.

== Other activities ==
Dawn founded Art Not War, a Brooklyn-based creative agency and production studio that specializes in creating cultural campaigns for social justice and progressive issues, where she is CEO and Chief Creative.

She has extensive experience in digital strategy, with over 2 billion views of her direct content, producing over one billion dollars of earned media and billions of impressions for social justice campaigns. Named one of the nation's Top 100 Creatives by Origin Magazine, and featured in the book "200 Women Who Will Change The Way You See The World", Laura was a Creative Consultant for Fenton Communications in the 2018 election year, and is on the Advisory Boards of not-for-profit organizations including Campaign to Unload, The Climate Mobilization, The Hometown Project, Swayable, Adopt A Kitchen, and was the founding Acting Director of the Climate Emergency Fund, where she is on the Advisory Board. She is the Founder of the Ethical Engine, a task force that seeks to nudge the public towards more progressive positions by targeted narrowcasting at scale, powered by personalized and emotionally aligned creative.

In June 2019, she helped to found a progressive news aggregator, Front Page Live, where she was Chief Creative Officer, together with Joe Romm, its Editor-in-Chief, Carl Cameron, Sunny Hundal, Helen Stickler and others.

== Bibliography ==
- Dawn, Laura, ed. (2006). It Takes a Nation: How Strangers Became Family in the Wake of Hurricane Katrina: The Story of MoveOn.org Civic Action's HurricaneHousing.org (PDF). San Rafael, CA: Earth Aware. ISBN 1-932771-86-7.
- 200 Women Who Will Change How You See The World
