= Francine McDougall =

Australian photographer

- Occupations: Film director, film producer, photographer, television director, television producer, screenwriter
- Years active: 1993–present
- Website: francinemcdougall.com

Francine McDougall is an Australian film director, film producer, photographer, television director, television producer and screenwriter. She is best known for directing the 2001 comedy film Sugar & Spice, her feature film directorial debut. She also directed the Disney Channel Original Movies Go Figure (2005) and Cow Belles (2006).

== Life and career ==
McDougall grew up in Sydney, Australia. In 1996, she directed the short film Pig!, a film that won a Sundance Film Festival award for best short film. In the next year she directed another short film entitled The Date starring Marla Sokoloff. From 2008 to 2010, McDougall was one of frequent directors of the Playhouse Disney series Imagination Movers.

She is also an accomplished photographer with her official website showcasing much of her work. She currently lives in Los Angeles.

== Credits ==
Year	Work	Creadit as			Note
Year	Work	Director	Writer	Producer	Note
1993	The Junky's Christmas	No	No	Yes	short film
1996	Pig!	Yes	Yes	No	short film
1997	The Date	Yes	Yes	Yes	short film
1998	Little Jimmy Scott: Why Was I Born?	No	No	Yes	Documentary
2000	Mosaic	Yes	Yes	Yes	TV documentary
2001	Sugar & Spice	Yes	No	No	
2004	Behind the Camera: The Unauthorized Story of Charlie's Angels	Yes	No	No	TV film
2005	Go Figure	Yes	No	No	TV film
2006	Cow Belles	Yes	No	No	TV film
2008–2010	Imagination Movers	Yes	No	No	TV series
