= Psychotica =

American industrial band

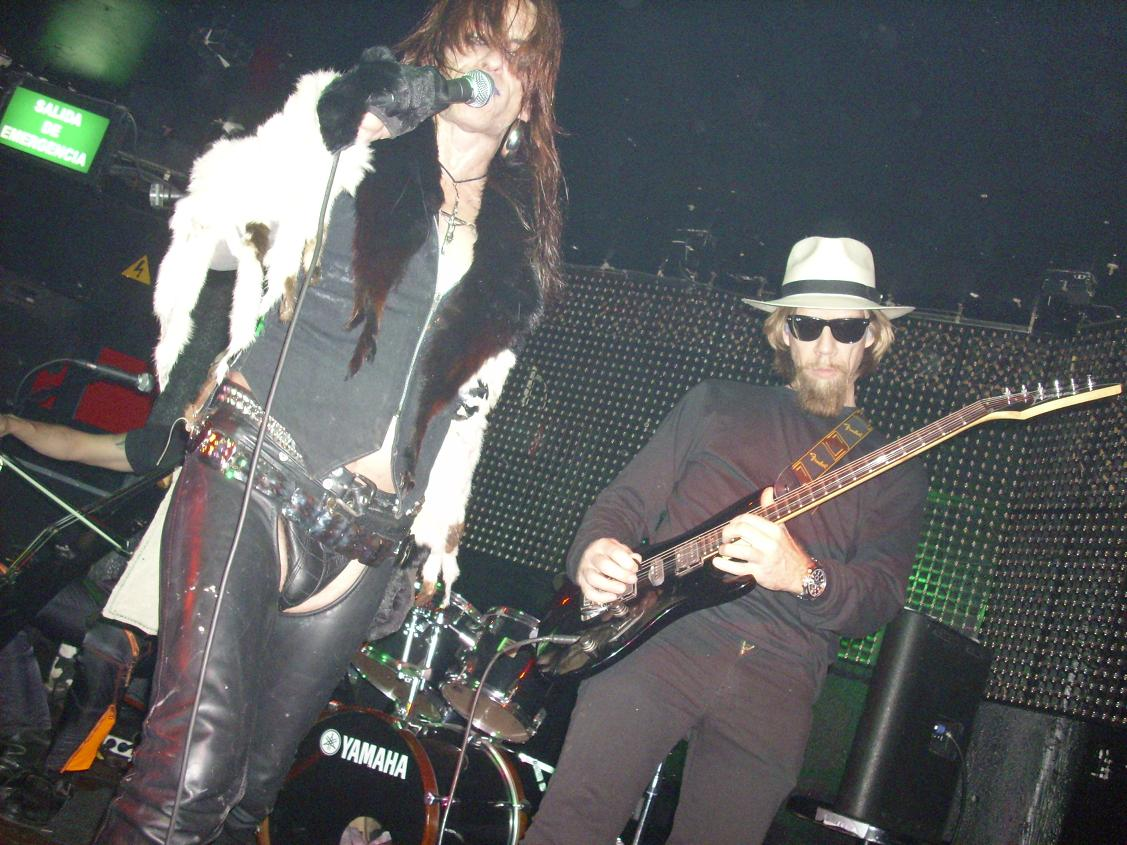
- Psychotica performing in Madrid, 2009

Background information
- Origin: New York City
- Genres: Industrial
- Labels: American Recordings, Ventrue Entertainment, Zero Hour Records, Art Monkey Records, Toxic Shock Records, Psychotica Records, Wanker Records
- Members: Pat Briggs; Paul Kostabi; Buz; Enrique Tiru; Reeka; Tommy Salmorin
- Website: psychotica.net

Psychotica were an American industrial rock band, with androgyn style formed in 1994 by Pat Briggs and Tommy Salmorin with a band consisting of Paul Kostabi, cellist Enrique Tiru Velez, backing vocalist Reeka, and drummer Buz. They have released three albums. Psychotica are best known for their participation in the 1996 Lollapalooza tour which also included Soundgarden, the Ramones, the Screaming Trees and Metallica and inspired in the aesthetic to some bands like Orgy and Marilyn Manson, for example in the álbum Mechanical Animals..

In 1996 tour on lollapalooza thee band have how the second singer Sophia Ramos for the tour what sings with psychotica on live stage. On a future she Sings in solitaire.

In 1998, Psychotica added guitarist Clint Walsh and released Espina. A tour with Jack Off Jill and Switchblade Symphony followed. Shortly after the tour, Briggs moved to Los Angeles. Briggs and Kostabi went in different directions and Psychotica disbanded.

In the summer of 2009, Briggs and Kostabi reunited to begin work on the fourth Psychotica album. Psychotica partnered with Christian Menses and his independent record label, Toxic Shock Records to re-release Pandemic.They played on Barcelona 2009 and récord a DVD called Live in Barcelona. Too appear in Azkena Festival in 2017 with Christian Menses on the bass.

On December 30, 2022, Psychotica's booking agency posted to Instagram that Patrick Briggs had died. Cause of death was not reported. Some people and friends supposed what was cáncer.

== Discography ==
- Psychotica (1996, Ventrue Entertainment/American Recordings) logo/cover designed by Stephen Sprouse
- Espina (1998, Zero Hour Records)
- Thorn (2004, Art Monkey Records) (Expanded reissue of Espina)
- Pandemic (2003, Art Monkey Records) (Previously unreleased 1999 album for Red Ant Records)
- Pandemic Re-Release (2008, Toxic Shock Records)
- Psychotica Acoustic (2009, Psychotica Records) (Digital only release)
- I Will Survive EP (2009, Toxic Shock Records)
- Black Dahlia EP (2010, Toxic Shock Records)
- All The Broken Souls & Pandemic (2018, Wanker Records)
