= Size 14 =

US musical group

- Origin: Hollywood, California, U.S.
- Genres: Power pop, alternative rock, indie rock
- Years active: 1995–1998
- Label: Volcano
- Spinoffs: Linus Of Hollywood; Nerf Herder; Able Machines; Artificial Joy; The Bastard Kings of Rock; Captain Genius; Jason Niebergall
- Past members: Kevin Danczak; Dave Armstrong; Linus of Hollywood; Robt Ptak; Ray Santangelo (1997-1998)
- Website: Size 14 Facebook Page Size 14 Instagram Page

Size 14 was an American rock band in the late 1990s based out of Hollywood that gained some notoriety with the novelty song "Claire Danes Poster". This song appeared on the Dude, Where's My Car? soundtrack; other Size 14 songs appeared on movies such as Sugar & Spice, 100 Girls, and 100 Women. They released one self-titled album on Volcano Entertainment in 1997.

Size 14 started after Linus of Hollywood answered an ad placed by bassist Robt Ptak in Recycler magazine looking for a lead or rhythm guitarist. They demoed all the material on Ptak's 8-track. Linus then pulled in his roommate Kevin Danczak to play guitar for Size 14. Drummer Dave Armstrong initially moved to Los Angeles to be in Ptak's solo project Artificial Joy; Armstrong recorded drum tracks for some of this material. (Artificial Joy would later become a full live band when Ptak moved to New York City.) Ptak then asked Armstrong to join Size 14 as their drummer. Linus stated in an interview that the track "Rollin in the 510" was about Kevin's old car. Size 14's sound came from influences at the time by bands such as Ridel High, Shufflepuck, That Dog, and Weezer.

In October 2013 the band's bassist Ptak mastered and released a digital only EP of previously unreleased tracks and demos titled 'Size 14 - Appetite for Self Destruction'. This EP featured tracks recorded with Ryan Dorm prior to the bands debut album being recorded with Mike Clink. 'Appetite for Self Destruction' was released via Robt Ptak's own SoundCloud, on the EP were early versions of album tracks, plus unreleased songs titled "Mental Patient", "Faster", and "Fudge" (early version of Sleep in the Wet Spot).

== Breakup ==
Ptak was replaced by bassist Ray Santangelo for a short West coast tour before Size 14 officially disbanded in early 1998 after the band's record label, Volcano Entertainment went out of business.

After leaving Size 14, Ptak played with Artificial Joy, The Bastard Kings of Rock, and managed the band Pin Me Down.

Guitarist Danczak played guitar and bass in Captain Genius from 2002 to 2007; the band released two albums.

Singer Linus of Hollywood has released three solo albums. As of December 2013 he is one half of the band Jarinus, plays guitar and keyboard in Nerf Herder, and runs Crappy Records with Jaret Reddick of Bowling for Soup. Linus is also involved in producing and songwriting for other bands such as Allstar Weekend, Bowling For Soup, and The Charlatans.

Linus released his fourth solo album in 2014 titled Something Good via the Pledgemusic platform, in 2018 he released the album Cabin Life.

Linus has been active since 2022 in the duo Able Machines with Los Angeles singer/hit songwriter Tay Côlieé. The band has released two studio albums titled Pathological in 2022 and most recently Digital Precision in 2023.

In 2026, founding member and bassist Ptak began releasing tracks he had composed and recorded during his time in the band. He has since released "Pain In My Head", "Dream is Dead", and "Consequence of Lies" as digital singles.

== Band members ==
Final line-up

- Linus Of Hollywood – guitar, vocals (1995–1998)
- Robt Ptak – bass, backing vocals (1995–1998)
- Dave Armstrong – drums, percussion (1995–1998)
- Kevin Danczak – guitar (1995–1998)

== Discography ==
Studio albums

- Size 14 (1997)

=== EPs ===
- Size 14 - Appetite For Self Destruction (Oct 2013) Self Released

=== Non Album Tracks ===
- Give Satan A Hug (on the Mulletcore CD from Drive Thru Records)
- Mrs.Claus - (on the VA - A Punk and Ska Christmas Gone Wrong CD)
- Faster
- Mental Patient
- Fudge ( earlier version of Sleeping In The Wetspot )
- Cooties ( Mike Clink Album sessions )
- Boyfriend ( Mike Clink album sessions )
- Fixin to Rock ( 8 Track Demos )
- Pedestrian Walker ( 8 Track Demos )
- Binoculars ( 8 Track Demos )
