= Vaeda =

American alternative rock band

- Origin: Long Island, New York, United States
- Genres: Rock, alternative rock
- Years active: 2003–2009
- Label: Playtyme Records (2006–2008)
- Members: Aristotle Dreher; Oliver Williams; Ian Lear-Nickum
- Past members: Chris Gignoux; Sam Kearney
- Website: http://www.vaeda.com

Vaeda was an American three-piece alternative rock band formed in Brooklyn, New York in 2003. In September–October 2005 Vaeda was the Number 1 unsigned artist on the Myspace music charts and has since been featured in films, television and national tours including the Vans Warped Tour and Rockstar Taste of Chaos.

The band was based in Long Island, New York. The name originates from an alternate spelling of the word Veda, which are the original sacred texts for the Hindu religion. The word itself means "knowledge" in Sanskrit. Additionally, there is a backronym derived from the name: Very Awesome Extra Double Awesome.

In 2006, Vaeda released their debut album State of Nature with the independent label Playtyme Records. Songs from that album have been featured on CBS—NCIS ("All for You") and Fox Television promos for Prison Break and Terminator: The Sarah Connor Chronicles ("Battle Song").

In late 2008, Vaeda appeared in the MTV Games Rock Band 2 national television commercial.

They have since parted with their former label and recorded an album titled Unsafe at Any Speed. Songs from the album can be heard on MTV's The Hills ("Breathe", "Fake The Moment") and The Girls of Hedsor Hall ("Breathe").

Vaeda has performed with and toured with the following acts: Thirty Seconds to Mars, Flyleaf, The Used, Anberlin, Framing Hanley, Rev Theory, Pop Evil, Saosin, Senses Fail, Haste the Day, and Chiodos.

On June 21, 2009, Vaeda announced on their Myspace page that due to their current circumstance, they were on indefinite hiatus. However, they also revealed that the upcoming album Unsafe At Any Speed was still due to be released, and that although they had no plans for tours or shows, that "no-one knows what tomorrow will bring."

On November 3, 2009, Vaeda released Unsafe at Any Speed via iTunes. The artwork for the album features a symbol of a man falling and a U-turn arrow, which had previously been unreleased. Also, Unsafe is the band's first album to use a different logo for the word Vaeda. As yet, a CD version of the album is unconfirmed.

== History ==
=== Formation ===
Drummer Oliver Williams, singer/guitarist Ian Lear-Nickum and former lead guitarist Chris Gignoux grew up together in the suburbs of Washington D.C. After college, they moved to Brooklyn, NYC, together, where they met the multi-instrumentalist Aristotle Dreher (The Bastard Kings of Rock). With Dreher on bass guitar, the foursome would soon form the band Vaeda and independently release their eponymous album in late 2003.

The band recorded a seven-song EP, The Red Queen, produced by Kyle Kelso in 2004.

Shortly thereafter, Gignoux left the band to complete his undergraduate degree in Biology and was replaced with Sam Kearney on lead guitar. After a brief stint and stylistic differences, Kearney left the band and went on tour with Fisherspooner. Vaeda, now a three-piece, had to adapt their style to accommodate for a lead guitarist. Along with Lear-Nickum's powerful vocals and Williams' unique drumming style, Dreher provided the ingenuity and creative edge that helped hone Vaeda's signature sound.

=== Early career ===
Vaeda moved to Los Angeles, California in early 2005 to work with Beau Dozier, son of Motown legend Lamont Dozier. While living in LA, the band released an EP with tracks they had recorded with Kelso titled "Unreleased Songs From The Red Queen Sessions." Through performance, promotion and the popularity of the track "All For You," Vaeda was propelled to the No. 1 spot on the Myspace unsigned artist chart. They stayed at No. 1 for several weeks which grabbed the attention of record labels.

While in Los Angeles, Vaeda learned that there had been another band performing under the same name but a different spelling. Because Vaeda was established for longer and had the name trademarked, the other band (spelled Veda) made the decision to change their name and are now known as Vedera.

=== State of Nature ===
State of Nature

Studio album by Vaeda
- Released: Aug 22, 2006
- Genres: Rock, alternative rock, nu metal
- Length: 45:54
- Label: Playtyme

Vaeda chronology
Unreleased Songs From The Red Queen Sessions (2005)	''State of Nature'' (2006)	Unsafe at any Speed (unreleased)

The band moved back to Long Island after touring up and down the west coast for most of 2005. They then reestablished their homebase on Long Island where Dreher was born and raised.

Playtyme Records signed Vaeda and released the album State of Nature in August, 2006. This album was produced by Kyle Kelso, and consists of the remixed and remastered recordings from the two previously released EPs (The Red Queen and Unreleased Songs From The Red Queen Sessions).

The band went on a three-month national tour in support of this album.

The CD artwork (conceptualized and designed by Dreher) is composed of 12 symbols, each representing a song title on the album and positioned around a doomsday clock which is set at "3 minutes to Midnight."

In late 2007 Vaeda petitioned for release from Playtyme and ended their contract in early 2008.

No.	Title	Writer(s)	Length
1.	"Money"	Ian Lear, Oliver Williams, Aristotle Dreher	3:08
2.	"All for you"	Ian Lear, Oliver Williams, Aristotle Dreher	3:32
3.	"Battle Song"	Ian Lear, Oliver Williams, Aristotle Dreher	3:58
4.	"Jesus Rides the Subway"	Ian Lear, Oliver Williams, Aristotle Dreher	3:58
5.	"Wait your turn"	Ian Lear, Oliver Williams, Aristotle Dreher	3:54
6.	"Bite my Tongue"	Ian Lear, Oliver Williams, Aristotle Dreher	3:13
7.	"1.25"	Ian Lear, Oliver Williams, Aristotle Dreher	3:43
8.	"Thief"	Ian Lear, Oliver Williams, Aristotle Dreher	3:55
9.	"Imperial"	Ian Lear, Oliver Williams, Aristotle Dreher	4:22
10.	"Kneejerk"	Ian Lear, Oliver Williams, Aristotle Dreher	2:46
11.	"Son of the Viper"	Ian Lear, Oliver Williams, Aristotle Dreher	4:33
12.	"Cacophony"	Ian Lear, Oliver Williams, Aristotle Dreher	5:34

=== Unsafe at any Speed ===
Unsafe At Any Speed

Studio album by Vaeda
- Released: 3 November 2009
- Genres: Nu metal, alternative rock, rock, indie rock
- Length: 43:36
- Label: N/A
- Producer: Trevor Kustiak

Vaeda chronology
State Of Nature (2006)	''Unsafe At Any Speed'' (2009)

Vaeda went on to record a 12-song album titled Unsafe at any Speed, which was released on Tuesday 3 November 2009. Several tracks off of the album have been played on SiriusXM satellite radio. Breathe also received airplay on 94.3 WMJC. Responsible for all of the band's artwork, Dreher created an ambiguous image depicting a heart surrounded by a ribcage in a wing formation. The artwork represents the first phase in Vaeda's three part motto which goes as follows:

"Music has the power to change hearts,
Hearts can change minds,
Minds can change the world."

However, this image was not used for the album's final artwork, and was replaced by a logo representing a man falling in a U-turn, but the heart design is found on some of the band's merchandise and apparel.

The band has said that they are "inspired by the power of music and thrive on making positive changes in the world one song at a time… one heart at a time."

Unsafe At Any Speed
No.	Title	Length
1.	"Vultures"	3:27
2.	"The Bystander Effect"	3:42
3.	"Breathe"	3:25
4.	"Suicide Romance"	3:08
5.	"Unsafe At Any Speed"	4:07
6.	"Nervous"	3:02
7.	"Save Your Savior"	4:00
8.	"Fake The Moment"	3:37
9.	"Novocain"	3:33
10.	"All For You (2009)"	3:22
11.	"Asleep At The Wheel"	3:59
12.	"The Camera"	4:26

=== Internet Radio Show ===
In 2008 Vaeda began hosting their own live internet radio show/podcast called Vaeda Radio. They are known for their boisterous personalities and irreverent sense of humor. Each week they played music from the local Long Island scene and had in studio interviews with other bands with whom they were friends. They ended each show with the declaration of their motto.

== Discography ==
- Vaeda (2003)
- The Red Queen EP (2004)
- Unreleased Songs From The Red Queen Sessions (2005)
- State of Nature (2006)
- Asleep at the Wheel EP (2008)
- Unsafe at any Speed (2009)
- State of Nature (Special Edition) (2013)
