= Ramones discography =

Discography of American punk rock band

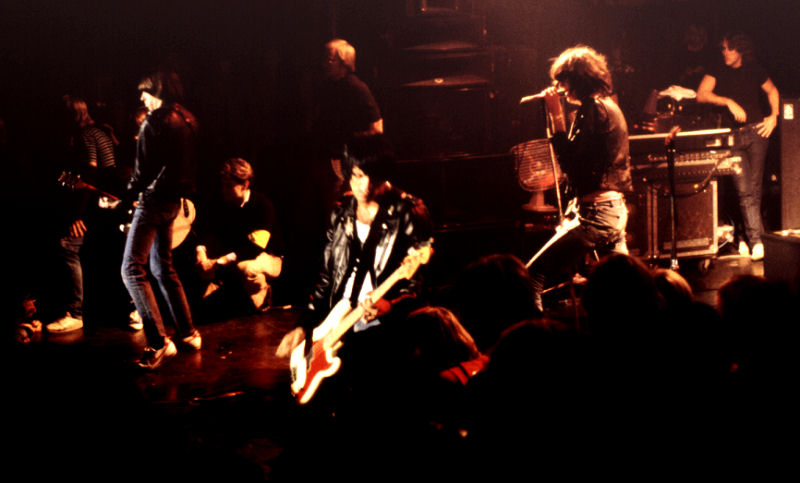
- The Ramones performing in 1980
- Studio albums: 14
- Extended plays: 1
- Live albums: 10
- Compilation albums: 16
- Singles: 34
- Music videos: 32
- Films: 10

The Ramones were an American punk rock band from New York City. Their discography consists of fourteen studio albums, ten live albums, sixteen compilation albums, seventy-one singles, thirty-two music videos and ten films. The band formed in early 1974, and upon signing with Seymour Stein of Sire Records, the Ramones released their self-titled debut album on April 23, 1976. Despite the recording process only taking a week and being on a budget of $6,400, the album has since become their most accoladed and iconic release. 1977's Leave Home was the band's follow up album, released less than a year later, also through Sire. While it was the first album to chart in the United Kingdom, it did not chart as well in the United States as Ramones, nor their third record, Rocket to Russia, which was released in late 1977. Road to Ruin was the band's fourth studio album and their first to feature a change in the band member line-up, with drummer Marky Ramone replacing Tommy Ramone.

It's Alive, released in 1979, was the Ramones' first live album, and only one to chart. The band's following studio album, 1980's End of the Century, was their only record produced by Phil Spector and their most successful album commercially, peaking at #44 on the United States Billboard 200 and charting in six other countries. In 1981 they released Pleasant Dreams with producer Graham Gouldman who, according to the album's critics, sparked a change in the Ramones' style of music, beginning a transition away from classic punk rock, surf punk and British punk sounds toward heavier punk rock, heavy metal and acid rock elements. Subterranean Jungle, released in 1983, would be the band's final release to chart within the top 100 of the Billboard 200, and was also the final release before firing Marky as drummer. Richie Ramone would be the band's new drummer for 1984's Too Tough to Die, which was produced by former drummer Tommy alongside Ed Stasium. While the album was critically acclaimed for having similar characteristics to the band's earlier albums, their next release, 1986's Animal Boy, incorporated more contemporary production techniques and sounds, including synthesizers.

Richie's final appearance would be on 1987's Halfway to Sanity, with Elvis Ramone briefly replacing him for two performances in August before Marky was brought back into the band. The band's first compilation album, entitled Ramones Mania, was released in 1988 and would go on to be certified Gold in the United States. 1989's Brain Drain would be their final album to feature Dee Dee Ramone as bassist, as well as their last to be released through Sire. The Ramones signed to Radioactive Records and released Mondo Bizarro in 1992 with new bassist C.J. Ramone. Despite being the band's least successful studio album in respect to the Billboard 200, it went Gold in Brazil in 2001. During the turn of the 80s and 90s, the band had 3 hits in the top 40 of national chart Modern Rock Tracks, being them Pet Sematary, Poison Heart and I Don't Wanna Grow Up (cover of Tom Waits). Their first and only cover album, Acid Eaters, was released in 1993, just a year and a half before the band's fourteenth and final studio album, ¡Adios Amigos!, produced by Halfway to Sanity producer Daniel Rey. Although the Ramones disbanded in mid-1996, thirteen compilation albums and four live albums have been released since then.

== Albums ==
=== Studio albums ===
Title	Album details	Peak positions								Certifications (sales thresholds)
Title	Album details	US	AUS	CAN	NLD	NOR	NZ	SWE	UK	Certifications (sales thresholds)
Ramones	Released: April 23, 1976; Label: Sire	111	—	—	185	—	—	48	—	RIAA: Platinum; BPI: Silver
Leave Home	Released: January 10, 1977; Label: Sire	148	—	—	—	—	—	—	45	
Rocket to Russia	Released: November 4, 1977; Label: Sire	49	79	36	—	—	—	31	60	BPI: Silver
Road to Ruin	Released: September 22, 1978; Label: Sire	103	99	—	—	—	—	25	32	
End of the Century	Released: February 4, 1980; Label: Sire	44	53	41	27	36	48	10	14	
Pleasant Dreams	Released: July 20, 1981; Label: Sire	58	87	—	—	—	—	35	—	
Subterranean Jungle	Released: February 28, 1983; Label: Sire	83	—	—	—	—	—	—	—	
Too Tough to Die	Released: October 1, 1984; Labels: Sire, Beggars Banquet, Ariola, RCA, Closer	171	—	—	—	—	—	49	63	
Animal Boy	Released: May 19, 1986; Labels: Sire, Beggars Banquet, Ariola, RCA, Barclay	143	—	94	—	—	—	37	38	
Halfway to Sanity	Released: September 15, 1987; Labels: Sire, Beggars Banquet, Ariola, RCA, Barclay	172	—	—	68	—	—	43	78	
Brain Drain	Released: May 23, 1989; Labels: Sire, Chrysalis	122	130	—	—	—	—	41	75	
Mondo Bizarro	Released: September 1, 1992; Labels: Radioactive, Chrysalis	190	93	—	—	—	—	41	87	
Acid Eaters	Released: December 1, 1993; Labels: Radioactive, Chrysalis	179	—	48	—	—	—	26	—	
¡Adios Amigos!	Released: July 18, 1995; Labels: Radioactive, Chrysalis	148	—	—	—	—	—	16	62	

=== Live albums ===
Title	Album details	Peak positions	
Title	Album details	SWE	UK
It's Alive	Released: April 1979; Label: Sire	38	27
Loco Live	Released: March 1992; Label: Sire	—	—
Greatest Hits Live	Released: June 1996; Label: Radioactive	—	—
We're Outta Here!	Released: November 1997; Label: MCA	—	—
NYC 1978	Released: August 2003; Label: King Biscuit	—	—
Live at the Roxy: August 12, 1976	Released: November 25, 2016; Label: Sire/Rhino	—	—
Live in Glasgow: December 19, 1977	Released: November 23, 2018; Label: Sire/Rhino	—	—
Live at the Palladium: New York, NY (12/31/79)	Released: April 13, 2019; Label: Sire/Rhino	—	—
It's Alive II	Released: September 26, 2020; Label: Sire/Rhino	—	—
Triple J Live at the Wireless – Capitol Theatre, Sydney, Australia, July 8, 1980	Released: July 17, 2021; Label: Sire/Rhino	—	—

=== Compilation albums ===
Title	Album details	Peak positions						Certifications (sales thresholds)
Title	Album details	US	BEL	CAN	SPA	SWE	UK	Certifications (sales thresholds)
Ramones Mania (The Best of 1976–1988)	Released: May 1988; Label: Sire	168	—	84	47	—	—	RIAA: Gold
All the Stuff (And More!) Volume 1 (First and second albums plus extra tracks)	Released: May 1990; Label: Sire	—	—	—	—	—	—	
All the Stuff (And More!) Volume 2 (Third and fourth albums plus extra tracks)	Released: September 1990; Label: Warner Bros.	—	—	—	—	—	—	
Hey! Ho! Let's Go: The Anthology (The Best of 1975–1996)	Released: July 1999; Label: Rhino	—	46	—	32	13	74	ARIA: Gold; BPI: Gold
Ramones Mania 2 (The Best of 1989–1996)	Released: April 2000; Label: Phantom	—	—	—	—	—	—	
Masters of Rock: Ramones (The Best of 1989–1995)	Released: August 2001; Label: EMI	—	—	—	—	—	—	
Best of the Chrysalis Years (The Best of 1989–1995)	Released: May 2002; Label: EMI	—	—	—	27	—	—	
Loud, Fast Ramones: Their Toughest Hits (The Best of 1975–1996)	Released: October 2002; Label: WEA	—	—	—	—	—	—	
The Chrysalis Years (Final four albums plus Loco Live)	Released: December 2002; Label: EMI International	—	—	—	61	—	—	
The Best of the Ramones (The Best of 1989–1995)	Released: May 2004; Label: Simply the Best	—	—	—	—	—	—	
Weird Tales of the Ramones	Released: August 2005; Labels: Rhino/Warner Bros.	—	—	—	—	—	—	
Hey Ho Let's Go: Greatest Hits (The Best of 1976–1989)	Released: June 2006; Label: Rhino	—	—	—	—	—	—	BPI: Gold
Essential	Released: July 16, 2007; Label: Chrysalis	—	—	—	—	—	—	
Opus Collection: Rockaway Beach	Released: August 14, 2012; Label: Starbucks Records	153	—	—	—	—	—	
The Ramones: All the Best (2CDs)	Released: December 12, 2012; Labels: EMI International / WEA / Chrysalis	_	—	—	—	—	—	
Morrissey Curates The Ramones	Released: November 28, 2014; Label: Rhino	—	—	—	—	—	—	
Ramones: The Sire Albums (1981–1989)	Released: April 23, 2022; Label: Rhino/Warner Records	—	—	—	—	—	—	
"—" denotes releases that did not chart or was not certified.

== Singles ==
Year	Title	Chart positions								Certification	Album
Year	Title	US	US Alt	AUS	BEL	IRE	NL	SWE	UK	Certification	Album
1976	"Blitzkrieg Bop" b/w "Havana Affair"	–	–	–	–	–	–	–	–	RIAA: 2× Platinum; BPI: Silver	Ramones
1976	"I Wanna Be Your Boyfriend" b/w "California Sun/I Don't Wanna Walk Around With You" (recorded live at The Roxy, Los Angeles)	–	–	–	–	–	–	–	–		Ramones
1977	"Carbona Not Glue" b/w "I Can't Be"	–	–	–	–	–	–	–	–		Leave Home
1977	"Swallow My Pride" b/w "Pinhead"	–	–	–	–	–	–	–	36		Leave Home
1977	"Sheena Is a Punk Rocker" b/w "I Don't Care"	81	–	–	–	–	–	20	22		Rocket to Russia
1977	"Rockaway Beach" b/w "Locket Love"	66	–	–	–	–	–	–	–		Rocket to Russia
1978	"Do You Wanna Dance?" b/w "Babysitter"	86	–	–	–	–	–	–	–		Rocket to Russia
1978	"Don't Come Close" b/w "I Don't Want You"	–	–	–	–	–	–	–	39		Road to Ruin
1978	"Needles and Pins" b/w "I Wanted Everything"	–	–	–	–	–	–	–	–		Road to Ruin
1979	"She's the One" b/w "I Wanna Be Sedated"	–	–	–	–	–	–	–	–		Road to Ruin
1979	"Rock 'n' Roll High School" b/w "Do You Wanna Dance? (Live Version)"	–	–	41	7	–	5	–	67		Rock 'n' Roll High School
1980	"Baby, I Love You" b/w "High Risk Insurance"	–	–	–	25	5	–	–	8		End of the Century
1980	"Danny Says" b/w "Chinese Rock"	–	–	–	–	–	–	–	–		End of the Century
1980	"Do You Remember Rock 'n' Roll Radio?" b/w "Let's Go"	–	–	–	–	–	–	–	54		End of the Century
1980	"I Wanna Be Sedated" b/w "The Return of Jackie and Judy"	–	–	–	–	–	–	–	–	RIAA: Platinum	Times Square
1981	"We Want the Airwaves" b/w "You Sound Like You're Sick"	–	^{[A]}	–	–	–	–	–	–		Pleasant Dreams
1981	"She's a Sensation" b/w "All's Quiet on the Eastern Front"	–	–	–	–	–	–	–	–		Pleasant Dreams
1981	"The KKK Took My Baby Away" b/w "Don't Go"	–	–	–	–	–	–	–	–		Pleasant Dreams
1983	"Time Has Come Today" b/w "Psycho Therapy"	–	–	–	–	–	–	–	–		Subterranean Jungle
1984	"Howling at the Moon (Sha-La-La)" b/w "Smash You"/"Street Fighting Man"	–	–	–	–	–	–	–	85^{[B]}		Too Tough to Die
1985	"Chasing the Night" b/w "Howling at the Moon (Sha-La-La)"/"Smash You"/"Street Fighting Man"	–	–	–	–	–	–	–	85^{[B]}		Too Tough to Die
1985	"Bonzo Goes to Bitburg" b/w "Go Home Ann"/"Daytime Dilemma (Dangers of Love)"	–	–	–	–	–	–	–	81		Animal Boy
1986	"Something to Believe In" b/w "Somebody Put Something in My Drink"/"(You) Can't Say Anything Nice"	–	–	–	–	–	–	–	69		Animal Boy
1986	"Crummy Stuff" b/w "Something to Believe In"/"(And) I Don't Wanna Live This Life"	–	–	–	–	–	–	–	98		Animal Boy
1987	"A Real Cool Time" b/w "Life Goes On"/"Indian Giver"	–	–	–	–	–	–	–	85		Halfway to Sanity
1987	"I Wanna Live" b/w "Merry Christmas (I Don't Want to Fight Tonight)"	–	–	–	–	–	–	–	–		Halfway to Sanity
1989	"Pet Sematary" b/w "Sheena Is a Punk Rocker"/"Life Goes On"	–	4	-	–	–	–	–	–		Brain Drain
1989	"I Believe in Miracles" b/w "All Screwed Up"	–	–	–	–	–	–	–	–		Brain Drain
1992	"Poison Heart" b/w "Chinese Rocks"/"Sheena Is a Punk Rocker"/"Rockaway Beach"	–	6	143	–	–	–	–	69		Mondo Bizarro
1992	"Strength to Endure" b/w "The Ballad of Tipper Gore"	–	–	–	–	–	–	–	–		Mondo Bizarro
1993	"Journey to the Center of the Mind"	–	–	–	–	–	–	–	–		Acid Eaters
1993	"Substitute" b/w "7 and 7 Is"/"Out of Time"	–	–	–	–	–	–	–	–		Acid Eaters
1994	"7 and 7 Is"	–	–	–	–	–	–	–	–		Acid Eaters
1995	"I Don't Want to Grow Up" b/w "She Talks to Rainbows"	–	30	—	—	–	–	–	–		¡Adios Amigos!
1996	"R.A.M.O.N.E.S."	–	–	–	–	–	–	–	–		Greatest Hits Live

- A "We Want the Airwaves" and "The KKK Took My Baby Away" charted together at No. 50 on the Billboard Hot Dance Club Play chart.
- B "Howling at the Moon (Sha-La-La)" and "Chasing the Night" were released together as a double A-side single in the UK.
- C "Something to Believe In" and "Somebody Put Something in My Drink" were released together as a double A-side single in the UK.

== Other songs ==
List of non-single songs with articles
Title	Year	Album
"Teenage Lobotomy"	1977	Rocket to Russia
"I Just Want to Have Something to Do"	1978	Road to Ruin
"Chinese Rock"	1980	End of the Century
"Durango 95"	1984	Too Tough to Die

== Music videos ==
Year	Video	Director
1979	"Do You Wanna Dance?"	Allan Arkush, from Rock 'n' Roll High School movie.
1979	"I Want You Around"	Allan Arkush, from Rock 'n' Roll High School movie.
1979	"I Just Want to Have Something to Do"	Allan Arkush, from Rock 'n' Roll High School movie.
1980	"Rock 'n' Roll High School"	Mark Robinson
1980	"Do You Remember Rock 'n' Roll Radio?"	Mark Robinson
1981	"We Want the Airwaves"	Craig Leiber, Kirk Heflin, Maureen Nappi
1981	"It's Not My Place (In the 9 to 5 World)"	Craig Leibner
1981	"The KKK Took My Baby Away"	Craig Leibner
1983	"Psycho Therapy"	Frances Delia
1983	"Time Has Come Today"	Demyan, Schiro
1984	"Howling at the Moon (Sha-La-La)"	Frances Delia
1986	"Something to Believe In"	Bill Fishman, Preacher Ewing
1986	"Somebody Put Something in My Drink" (Rough Cut)	George Seminara
1987	"I Wanna Live"	Bill Fishman, Preacher Ewing
1988	"I Wanna Be Sedated"	Bill Fishman
1989	"Pet Sematary"	Bill Fishman
1989	"Merry Christmas (I Don't Want to Fight Tonight)"	George Seminara
1990	"I Believe in Miracles"	George Seminara
1991	"Blitzkrieg Bop" (Live)	George Seminara
1992	"Poison Heart"	Samuel Bayer
1992	"Strength to Endure"	George Seminara
1992	"Touring" (Original Version)	John Cafiero
1994	"Substitute"	Tom Rainone
1995	"I Don't Want to Grow Up"	Jonathon Dayton, Valerie Faris
1996	"Spiderman"	Jonathon Dayton, Valerie Faris

== Films ==
Year	Film	Director	Certifications (sales thresholds)
1976	The Blank Generation	Ivan Kral, Amos Poe	
1979	Rock 'n' Roll High School	Allan Arkush	
1990	Lifestyles of the Ramones	George Seminara	
1993	"Rosebud" (The Simpsons)	Wes Archer	
1998	Ramones – Around the World	Marky Ramone	
2002	The Ramones and I	Rusty Nails	
2003	End of the Century: The Story of the Ramones	Jim Fields, Michael Gramaglia	BPI: Silver * ARIA: Gold
2004	Ramones: Raw	John Cafiero	RIAA: Gold * ARIA: Gold
2006	Too Tough to Die: A Tribute to Johnny Ramone	Mandy Stein	
2007	It's Alive 1974–1996	George Seminara	ARIA: Gold

== Tribute albums ==
=== Full album tributes ===
Year	Album	Artist	Record company
1992	Ramones	Screeching Weasel	Selfless Records
1994	Leave Home	The Vindictives	Selfless Records
1994	Rocket to Russia	The Queers	Selfless Records, Liberation Records
1996	End of the Century	Boris the Sprinkler	Clearview Records
1997	It's Alive	Parasites	Clearview Records
1997	Pleasant Dreams	Beatnik Termites	Clearview Records
1998	Road to Ruin	The Mr. T Experience	Clearview Records
1998	Too Tough to Die	Jon Cougar Concentration Camp	Liberation Records
2000	Too Tough to Die	The McRackins	Clearview Records
2001	Ramones Maniacs	Various	Trend Is Dead! Records
2004	Subterranean Jungle	Tip Toppers	Ramones Fans Norway
2011	Halfway to Sanity	Kobanes	Fixing A Hole Records
2019	Animal Boy	The New Rochelles	
2021	Mondo Bizarro	K7s	Family Spree Recordings
2022	Leave Home	The Canceled Sitcoms	Blitzkrieg Cat Records

=== Other tributes ===
Year	Album	Artist(s)	Record Company
1987	Ramones	Operation Ivy	Metropolis Records
1991	Gabba Gabba Hey: A Tribute to the Ramones	Various	Triple X Records
1996	Rocket to Ramonia	The Huntingtons	Burnt Toast Vinyl
1998	Blitzkrieg Over You	Various	Nasty Vinyl
1999	File Under Ramones	The Huntingtons	Tooth and Nail Records
2001	Glue Sniffin' Shocker	Reload	Reload Music
2002	Strength to Endure: A Tribute to Ramones & Motörhead	Riotgun. & Bullet Treatment	Basement Records
2002	The Song Ramones The Same	Various	White Jazz Records
2002	Ramones Forever: An International Tribute	Various	Radical Records
2003	We're a Happy Family: A Tribute to Ramones	Various	Columbia Records
2004	Sniffin' Glue: A Las Vegas Tribute to the Ramones	Various	Afternoon Records
2005	Guitar Tribute to the Ramones	Various	Tribute Sounds Records
2005	The Rockabilly Tribute to Ramones	Various	CMH Records
2005	Pan for Punks...A Steelpan Tribute to the Ramones	Tracy Thornton	Pandemic Records
2006	Brats on the Beat: Ramones for Kids	Various	Go-Kart Records
2007	Rockabye Baby! Lullaby Renditions of the Ramones	Various	Rockabye Baby Records
2008	Bossa n' Ramones	Various	Music Brokers Records
2008	Rocket from Poland	Dumbs	Pasażer Records
2011	Osaka Ramones	Shonen Knife	Good Charamel Records
2018	Songs in the Key of Joey	Aaron Stingray and the Brooklyn Apostles	Blitzkrieg Cat Records
