= Scott Hackwith =

American musician (born 1968)

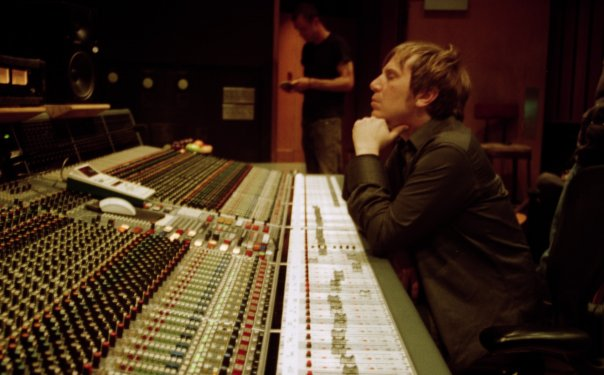
- Scott Hackwith at Capitol Studios, Hollywood

Background information
- Birth name: Philip Scott Hackwith
- Born: September 3, 1968 (age 56)
- Origin: San Diego, California, US
- Genres: rock, punk, alternative rock
- Occupation(s): Composer, record producer, musician, chief creative officer
- Instrument(s): guitar, vocals, other
- Labels: Caroline Records, MCA Records, Radioactive Records
- Website: Slogan Music

Scott Hackwith (born September 3, 1968) is an American composer-producer-musician whose career has progressed from work as a professional guitarist and singer to recording producer and scoring motion pictures. Currently, he is the owner-chief creative officer of Cassette Recordings, a Los Angeles & Reykjavik, Iceland based company specializing in creating original music for placement in films, documentaries, television shows and commercials.

Hackwith has completed jobs for hundreds of major clients. Cassette Recordings with a composer collective in Los Angeles as well as in Iceland, represents some award-winning composers, and past associations have included The Ramones, Iggy Pop, and Dave Jerden (Rolling Stones, Jane's Addiction).

As a songwriter-composer, Hackwith has both contributed songs and written soundtracks to numerous feature films, including the Russell Crowe-Denzel Washington headlined Virtuosity, Adam Sandler's Airheads, the award-winning Love & Sex, starring Famke Janssen and Jon Favreau and Love is the Drug, starring John Patrick Amedori and Lizzy Caplan.

== Career ==
Born September 3, 1968, in San Diego, California, Hackwith eventually re-located to Los Angeles where he divided his time between playing lead guitar for T.S.O.L., recording numerous home demos on a four track and landing a day job at Propaganda Films. Working behind the camera for acclaimed directors David Fincher (Fight Club, The Curious Case of Benjamin Button), Dominic Sena (Gone in 60 Seconds, Swordfish), Michael Bay (Transformers, Pearl Harbor) and Mark Romanek (One Hour Photo). Hackwith's talent quickly propelled him from production assistant to serve as art director and production designer for their music videos and TV commercials. Nonetheless, music remained his primary interest and Hackwith reserved the evenings to either perform, write or record his original material.

=== Dig ===
In 1991, Hackwith formed the heavy alternative/grunge rock band, Dig, whose debut EP Runt was issued by Caroline Records (home to Brian Eno, Smashing Pumpkins) and topped the influential CMJ chart. After coming to the attention of record exec-manager Gary Kurfirst (Talking Heads, Blondie), the band signed with MCA's Radioactive imprint. Dig's "Believe" single enjoyed success on Billboard's Top 20 and at MTV, who aired the Hackwith-directed "Believe" video on the network's Buzz Worthy program for months.

=== As a producer ===
Dig played alongside the Flaming Lips, The Ramones, Red Hot Chili Peppers and many others, which led to some lasting alliances. The most notable include Iggy Pop, with whom he frequently participated in after hours jams (Pop even featured Hackwith's vocals on his Brick by Brick album), and The Ramones, who chose Hackwith to produce their 1993 Acid Eaters, which Spin Magazine called "the best Ramones record made in a decade." He also produced the band's retrospective sets Ramones Mania Vol. 2 (2000), Masters of Rock (2001), The Chrysalis Years (2002), Best of the Chrysalis Years (2002), The Best of The Ramones (2004), Weird Tales of the Ramones (2005) and Greatest Hits (2006).

Hackwith's numerous production credits, apart from all of Dig's albums, include Beachwood Sparks' acclaimed 2002 Make the Cowboy Robots Cry album (co-produced with Jimmy Tamborello), live albums by punk spearheads the Circle Jerks, Agent Orange, and many more.

=== Composer ===
Hackwith subsequently became a full-time composer for film and television. Along with work for commercial clients, Hackwith's 2009 credits include composing music for the Discovery Channel's Bone Detectives TV series and forthcoming documentary Raised in the Ring. Scott was recently entrusted with Motown's original multi-track tapes of the classic Jackson 5 hit "I'll be There", and produced a re-mix for a State Farm Insurance commercial.

== Record producer and engineer discography ==
- Andrew McKeag Band (2017)
- Secret Agent - Pedro Pistola Piñata Party (2017)
- HORN - 06-16-16 (2016)
- GospelbeacH - Pacific Surf Line (2015)
- Spiritualized - Sweet Light Sweet Heart (2012)
- For a Minor Reflection - Höldum í átt að óreiðu (2010)
- Modern Cinema - Modern Cinema (2007)
- Beandip - Dark Brown (2007)
- Circle Jerks (2007)
- Agent Orange (2007)
- Modern Cinema - Do Yo Think I'm Sexy (2006)
- Only Son - The Drop to the Top (2006)
- Ramones - Hey Ho Let's Go: Greatest Hits (2006)
- Ramones - Weird Tales of the Ramones (2005)
- Ramones - The Best of the Ramones (2002)
- Ramones - Best of the Chrysalis Years (2002)
- Ramones - The Chrysalis Years (2002)
- Beachwood Sparks - Make the Cowboy Robots Cry (2002)
- Lost at Last - Lost at Last (2001)
- Ramones - Masters of Rock: Ramones (2001)
- Ramones - Ramones Mania 2 (2000)
- Dig - Life Like (1999)
- Dig - Defenders of the Universe (1996)
- Dig - Whose Side You On? (1996)
- Ramones - Acid Eaters (1993)
- Dig - Dig (1993)
- Dig - Runt EP (1992)
