= List of punk rock compilation albums =

This is a list of punk rock compilation albums. Compilation albums played a particularly vital role in the development of new punk rock bands, since relatively few local bands had a large enough audience to justify their own albums.

== Multiple-band albums ==
=== United States ===
Album	Released	Label	Description
American Youth Report	1982 LP, 1994 CD	Bomp! Records	Mostly Southern California hardcore
The Blasting Concept	1983 LP	SST Records	SST artists, mostly Southern California hardcore
Can of Pork	1992 2xLP, 1994 CD	Lookout! Records	29 bands mostly from California. Also features bands from other parts of the U.S.
The Decline of Western Civilization (soundtrack)	1981 LP, 1996 CD	Warner Bros.	Live performances from the movie. Mostly L.A. hardcore.
Fat Music	Various 1994-2010	Fat Wreck Chords	Various bands on the Fat Wreck Chords roster
Flex Your Head	1982 LP, 1993 CD	Dischord	11 bands from the Washington D.C. hardcore scene
Flipside Vinyl Fanzine	1984 LP, 1993 CD	Flipside Records	3-record set. The 2-CD version omits a few songs. Hardcore.
Hell Comes to Your House	1981 LP, 1998 CD	Time Bomb/Bemis Brain	Side 1 hardcore, side 2 deathrock
Let Them Eat Jellybeans!	1981 LP	Alternative Tentacles	Side 1 hardcore, side 2 various genres.
Nardcore	1984 LP, 2002 CD	Mystic Records	Hardcore from Oxnard, California. An example of Mystic's "local" records.
International P.E.A.C.E. Benefit Compilation	1984 2-LP, 1997 2-CD	R Radical Records (1984); New Red Archives (1997)	55 punk and hardcore bands from 13 countries around the world.
New York Thrash	1982 cassette, 1998 CD	ROIR	CD has additional tracks. Punk and hardcore.
Not So Quiet on the Western Front	1982 LP, 1999 CD	Alternative Tentacles	47 bands, mostly Northern California hardcore.
Punk-O-Rama	Various 1994-2005	Epitaph Records	Series of low-cost albums featuring Epitaph artists. Early issues are mostly punk.
Punkzilla	Various 2001	Nitro Records	Compilation album consisting of songs by bands on Nitro Records.
Red Scare Industries: Ten Years Of Your Dumb Bullshit	Various 2014 CD & LP	Red Scare Industries	17 artists from the Red Scare roster, unreleased material
Rock Against Bush	Various 2004	Fat Wreck Chords	Punk rock songs against George Bush.
Rodney on the ROQ	Various	Posh Boy Records	Series of three. Punk and New Wave as popularized by the radio program.
Something to Believe in	1984	BYO Records	17 Bands, mostlry early 80's hardcore
Streets	1977 LP	Beggars Banquet Records	Early punk compilation (mostly from UK)
The Thing That Ate Floyd	1988 LP, 2002 CD	Lookout! Records	East Bay punk and hardcore.
This Is Boston, Not L.A.	1982 LP	Modern Method Records	Early Boston hardcore. CD version also includes the Unsafe at Any Speed compilation EP.
Turn It Around!	1987 2x 7", 1991 12"	Maximumrocknroll; Very Small Records	12 bands from the 924 Gilman Street project in Berkeley, California.

=== United Kingdom ===
Album	Released	Label	Description
Raw War (The World Of Punk)	1983 CS	Xcentric Noise Records	International compilation with bands from Brazil, Canada, Finland, Holland, Italy, Norway, and the U.K.

=== Canada ===
Album	Released	Label	Description
Vancouver Complication	1981 LP	Pinned Records – PIN 79330001	Canadian compilation featuring bands from Vancouver and Victoria, British Columbia, Canada

== Single-band albums ==
=== The Clash ===
- 5 Album Studio Set
- 1977 Revisited
- The Clash Hits Back
- Clash on Broadway
- The Essential Clash
- Singles Box
- The Singles (1991 The Clash album)
- The Singles (2007 The Clash album)
- Sound System (album)
- The Story of the Clash, Volume 1
- Super Black Market Clash

=== The Cramps ===
- ...Off the Bone

=== Germs ===
- What We Do Is Secret (EP)

=== Ramones ===
- All the Stuff (And More) Volume One
- All the Stuff (And More) Volume Two
- Best of the Chrysalis Years
- The Best of the Ramones
- The Chrysalis Years
- Essential (Ramones album)
- Greatest Hits (Ramones album)
- Hey! Ho! Let's Go: The Anthology
- Lifestyles of the Ramones
- Loud, Fast Ramones: Their Toughest Hits
- Masters of Rock: Ramones
- Weird Tales of the Ramones

=== The Reverend Horton Heat ===
- 20th Century Masters – The Millennium Collection: The Best of The Reverend Horton Heat

=== The Saints ===
- The Greatest Cowboy Movie Never Made
- Know Your Product: The Best of The Saints

== By punk rock subgenre ==
=== Garage punk ===
- Hell on Earth: A Tribute to the Misfits

=== Protopunk ===
- A-Square (Of Course): The Story of Michigan's Legendary A-Square Records
- Green Crystal Ties, Volume 7: Mind-Expanding Punk of the 60s
- No Thanks! The '70s Punk Rebellion
- Nuggets: Original Artyfacts from the First Psychedelic Era, 1965–1968
- SEX: Too Fast to Live Too Young to Die

=== Punk jazz ===
==== John Zorn compilation albums ====
- Black Box (Naked City album)
- The Classic Guide to Strategy
- Filmworks 1986–1990
- Godard/Spillane
- Naked City: The Complete Studio Recordings
- Painkiller: The Collected Works
- The Parachute Years
- Torture Garden (album)

=== Ska punk ===
==== NOFX compilation albums ====
- 45 or 46 Songs That Weren't Good Enough to Go on Our Other Records
- The Greatest Songs Ever Written (By Us)
- The Longest EP
- Maximum Rocknroll (album)

== See also ==
- Lists of albums
- Mystic Records, a label specializing in compilation albums
- Punk rock subgenres
