= Ramones Mania 2 =

Compilation album by Ramones
- Released: April 18, 2000
- Recorded: 1988–1996
- Genre: Punk rock
- Length: 64:13
- Label: EMI Japan

Ramones compilation album chronology
Hey! Ho! Let's Go: The Anthology (1999)	Ramones Mania 2 (2000)	Masters of Rock: Ramones (2001)

Professional ratings
Review scores
Source	Rating
Allmusic	1.5/5 stars

Ramones Mania 2 is a greatest hits album by American punk band Ramones that serves as a sequel to the band's first compilation album, Ramones Mania. It includes 25 Ramones songs, from the band's last three studio albums—Mondo Bizarro, Acid Eaters and ¡Adios Amigos!—and from the band's third live album, Greatest Hits Live, all of which were released on Radioactive Records. Although this compilation was released a decade after 1989's Brain Drain, it does not feature any songs from that album, as the band was with Sire Records at that time. It was released in 1999 as a Japanese-only release on EMI Japan. Unlike the first album, all the songs here are presented in chronological order. It is currently out of print.

== Track listing ==
No.	Title	Writer(s)	Source album	Length
1.	"Censorshit"	Joey Ramone	Mondo Bizarro (1992)	3:25
2.	"Poison Heart"	Dee Dee Ramone, Daniel Rey	Mondo Bizarro	4:03
3.	"Strength to Endure"	D. Ramone, Rey	Mondo Bizarro	2:59
4.	"It's Gonna Be Alright"	Joey Ramone, Andy Shernoff	Mondo Bizarro	3:19
5.	"Take It as It Comes"	Jim Morrison, John Densmore, Robby Krieger, Ray Manzarek	Mondo Bizarro	2:07
6.	"I Won't Let It Happen"	Joey Ramone, Shernoff	Mondo Bizarro	2:20
7.	"Touring"	Joey Ramone	Mondo Bizarro	2:50
8.	"Journey to the Center of the Mind"	Ted Nugent, Steve Farmer	Acid Eaters (1993)	2:51
9.	"Substitute"	Pete Townshend	Acid Eaters	3:14
10.	"Somebody to Love"	Darby Slick	Acid Eaters	2:31
11.	"7 and 7 Is"	Arthur Lee	Acid Eaters	1:50
12.	"My Back Pages"	Bob Dylan	Acid Eaters	2:26
13.	"Have You Ever Seen the Rain?"	John Fogerty	Acid Eaters	2:21
14.	"I Don't Want to Grow Up"	Tom Waits, Kathleen Brennan	¡Adios Amigos! (1995)	2:43
15.	"The Crusher"	D. Ramone, Rey	¡Adios Amigos!	2:24
16.	"Life's a Gas"	Joey Ramone	¡Adios Amigos!	3:32
17.	"Take the Pain Away"	D. Ramone, Rey	¡Adios Amigos!	2:41
18.	"I Love You"	Johnny Thunders	¡Adios Amigos!	2:19
19.	"Cretin Family"	D. Ramone, Rey	¡Adios Amigos!	2:07
20.	"Have a Nice Day"	Marky Ramone, Garrett Uhlenbrock	¡Adios Amigos!	1:38
21.	"Got a Lot to Say"	C.J. Ramone	¡Adios Amigos!	1:39
22.	"She Talks to Rainbows"	Joey Ramone	¡Adios Amigos!	3:12
23.	"Spiderman"	Robert Harris, Paul Francis Webster	Saturday Morning: Cartoons' Greatest Hits (1995)	2:05
24.	"Anyway You Want It"	Dave Clark	Greatest Hits Live (1996)	2:18
25.	"R.A.M.O.N.E.S."	Lemmy, Würzel, Phil Cambell, Phil "Philthy Animal" Taylor	Greatest Hits Live	1:22

== Personnel ==
- Joey Ramone – lead vocals
- Johnny Ramone – guitar
- C.J. Ramone – bass, backing vocals
- Marky Ramone – drums
