= The Chrysalis Years =

Compilation album by Ramones
- Released: August 29, 2002
- Recorded: 1989–1995
- Genre: Punk rock
- Length: 3 Discs; 84 Tracks
- Label: Chrysalis
- Producer: Jean Beauvoir; Bill Laswell; Daniel Rey; Ed Stasium; Scott Hackwith

Ramones compilation album chronology
Best of the Chrysalis Years (2002)	The Chrysalis Years (2002)	Loud, Fast Ramones: Their Toughest Hits (2002)

Professional ratings
Review scores
Source	Rating
Allmusic	3/5 stars

The Chrysalis Years is a three-disc compilation that includes all five of the Ramones albums on Chrysalis Records (or also the band's final five releases): Brain Drain, Mondo Bizarro, Acid Eaters, ¡Adios Amigos! and Loco Live (some versions include "Animal Boy" from Loco Live). It was released in 2002.

== Track listing ==
=== Disc One ===
1. "I Believe In Miracles"
2. "Zero Zero UFO"
3. "Don't Bust My Chops"
4. "Punishment Fits The Crime"
5. "All Screwed Up"
6. "Palisades Park"
7. "Pet Semetary"
8. "Learn to Listen"
9. "Can't Get You Out of My Mind"
10. "Ignorance Is Bliss"
11. "Come Back Baby"
12. "Merry Christmas (I Don't Want To Fight Tonight)"
13. "Journey to the Centre of the Mind"
14. "Substitute"
15. "Out of Time"
16. "Shape of Things to Come"
17. "Somebody to Love"
18. "When I Was Young"
19. "7 And 7 Is"
20. "My Back Pages"
21. "Can't Seem to Make You Mine"
22. "Have You Ever Seen the Rain?"
23. "I Can't Control Myself"
24. "Surf City"
25. "Spider-Man"

=== Disc Two ===
1. "Censorshit"
2. "Job That Ate My Brain"
3. "Poison Heart"
4. "Anxiety"
5. "Strength to Endure"
6. "It's Gonna Be Alright"
7. "Take It As It Comes"
8. "Main Man"
9. "Tomorrow She Goes Away"
10. "I Won't Let It Happen"
11. "Cabbies On Crack"
12. "Heidi Is a Head Case"
13. "Touring"
14. "I Don't Want to Grow Up"
15. "Makin' Monsters for My Friends"
16. "It's Not for Me to Know"
17. "Crusher"
18. "Life's a Gas"
19. "Take the Pain Away"
20. "I Love You"
21. "Cretin' Family"
22. "Have a Nice Day"
23. "Scattergun"
24. "Got a Lot to Say"
25. "She Talks to Rainbows"
26. "Born to Die In Berlin"

=== Disc Three ===
1. "The Good, the Bad, and the Ugly" (live)
2. "Durango '95" (live)
3. "Teenage Lobotomy" (live)
4. "Psycho Therapy" (live)
5. "Blitzkrieg Bop" (live)
6. "Do You Remember Rock 'n' Roll Radio?" (live)
7. "I Believe In Miracles" (live)
8. "Gimme Gimme Shock Treatment" (live)
9. "Rock N' Roll High School" (live)
10. "I Wanna Be Sedated" (live)
11. "The KKK Took My Baby Away" (live)
12. "I Wanna Live" (live)
13. "Bonzo Goes To Bitzberg" (live)
14. "Too Tough to Die" (live)
15. "Sheena Is a Punk Rocker" (live)
16. "Rockaway Beach" (live)
17. "Pet Semetary" (live)
18. "Don't Bust My Chops" (live)
19. "Palisades Park" (live)
20. "Mama's Boy" (live)
21. "Animal Boy" (live)
22. "Wart Hog" (live)
23. "Surfin' Bird" (live)
24. "Cretin' Hop" (live)
25. "I Don't Wanna Walk Around With You" (live)
26. "Today Your Love Tomorrow The World" (live)
27. "Pinhead" (live)
28. "Somebody Put Something In My Drink" (live)
29. "Beat on the Brat" (live)
30. "Judy Is a Punk" (live)
31. "Chinese Rocks" (live)
32. "Love Kills" (live)
33. "Ignorance Is Bliss" (live)
