= Essential (Ramones album) =

Compilation album by Ramones
- Released: July 9, 2007
- Genre: Punk rock
- Label: Chrysalis

Ramones compilation album chronology
Greatest Hits (2006)	Essential (2007)	Morrissey Curates The Ramones (2014)

Professional ratings
Review scores
Source	Rating
Allmusic	3/5 stars

Essential is a compilation album by the punk rock band the Ramones. It was released on July 9, 2007, by Chrysalis. The record is made up of tracks from the group's five albums on the imprint: Brain Drain, Mondo Bizarro, Acid Eaters, ¡Adios Amigos!, and Loco Live.

== Track listing ==
1. "Can't Get You Outta My Mind'"
2. "Poison Heart"
3. "Scattergun"
4. "Come Back Baby"
5. "Pinhead (Live)"
6. "Chinese Rocks (Live)"
7. "Surf City"
8. "Rockaway Beach (Live)"
9. "Censorshit"
10. "Touring"
11. "Blitzkrieg Bop (Live)"
12. "Sheena Is a Punk Rocker (Live)"
13. "Take It As It Comes"
14. "It's Not For Me To Know"
15. "Pet Sematary"
16. "She Talks To Rainbows"
17. "I Won't Let It Happen"
18. "Surfin' Bird (Live)"
19. "Tomorrow She Goes Away"
20. "Merry Christmas (I Don't Want To Fight Tonight)"

The tracks on this compilation are taken from the following Ramones albums:

- 1, 4, 15, 20 – Brain Drain (1989)
- 2, 9, 10, 13, 17, 19 – Mondo Bizarro (1992)
- 3, 14, 16 – ¡Adios Amigos! (1995)
- 5, 6, 8, 11, 12, 18 – Loco Live (1991)
- 7 – Acid Eaters (1993)
