= Best of the Chrysalis Years =

Greatest hits album by The Ramones
- Released: May 28, 2002
- Recorded: 1989–1995
- Genre: Punk rock
- Length: 42:10
- Label: Chrysalis
- Producers: Jean Beauvoir; Bill Laswell; Daniel Rey; Ed Stasium; Scott Hackwith

Ramones compilation album chronology
Masters of Rock: Ramones (2001)	Best of the Chrysalis Years (2002)	The Chrysalis Years (2002)

Professional ratings
Review scores
Source	Rating
AllMusic	2.5/5 stars

Best of the Chrysalis Years is a compilation album made up of tracks from the Ramones' five albums on Chrysalis Records (UK): Brain Drain, Mondo Bizarro, Acid Eaters, ¡Adios Amigos!, and Loco Live. It was released on May 28, 2002, by EMI International. The album was re-released in 2004 with a new track listing as The Best of The Ramones.

Best of the Chrysalis Years was released nine days before Ramones bassist Dee Dee Ramone's death.

== Track listing ==
1. "Pet Sematary" – (Dee Dee Ramone/Daniel Rey)
2. "Don't Bust My Chops" – (Dee Dee Ramone/Joey Ramone/Daniel Rey)
3. "Ignorance Is Bliss" – (Joey Ramone/Andy Shernoff)
4. "Sheena Is a Punk Rocker (live)" – (Joey Ramone)
5. "Teenage Lobotomy (live)" – (The Ramones)
6. "Surfin' Bird (live)" – (Al Frazier/Sonny Harris/Carl White/Turner Wilson)
7. "Poison Heart" – (Dee Dee Ramone/Daniel Rey)
8. "Anxiety" – (Marky Ramone/Skinny Bones)
9. "Take It as It Comes" – (Jim Morrison/John Densmore/Robby Krieger/Ray Manzarek)
10. "Cretin Hop (live)" – (The Ramones)
11. "Rockaway Beach (live)" – (Dee Dee Ramone)
12. "I Wanna Be Sedated (live)" – (Joey Ramone)
13. "Out of Time" – (Mick Jagger/Keith Richards)
14. "Somebody to Love" – (Darby Slick)
15. "Rock And Roll Radio (Live)" – (Joey Ramone)
16. "Blitzkrieg Bop (live)" – (Tommy Ramone/Dee Dee Ramone)
17. "I Don't Wanna Grow Up" – (Tom Waits/Kathleen Brennan)
18. "Got a Lot to Say" – (C.J. Ramone)

The tracks on this compilation are taken from the following Ramones albums:

- 1, 2, 3 – Brain Drain (1989)
- 4, 5, 6, 10, 11, 12, 15, 16 – Loco Live (1991)
- 7, 8, 9 – Mondo Bizarro (1992)
- 13, 14 – Acid Eaters (1993)
- 17, 18 – ¡Adios Amigos! (1995)
