= Masters of Rock: Ramones =

Compilation album by Ramones
- Released: August 23, 2001
- Recorded: 1989–1995
- Genre: Punk rock
- Label: EMI
- Producers: Jean Beauvoir; Bill Laswell; Daniel Rey; Ed Stasium; Scott Hackwith

Ramones compilation album chronology
Ramones Mania Vol. 2 (2000)	Masters of Rock: Ramones (2001)	Best of the Chrysalis Years (2002)

Professional ratings
Review scores
Source	Rating
Allmusic	2.5/5 stars

Masters of Rock: Ramones is a compilation album by the Ramones. It was released on EMI in 2001. The record is made up of tracks from the five Ramones albums on Chrysalis Records: Brain Drain, Mondo Bizarro, Acid Eaters, ¡Adios Amigos! and Loco Live.

== Track listing ==
1. "Pet Semetary"
2. "I Believe In Miracles"
3. "Poison Heart"
4. "All Screwed Up"
5. "Censorshit"
6. "The Job That Ate My Brain"
7. "Cabbies on Crack"
8. "Strength To Endure"
9. "I Won't Let It Happen"
10. "Substitute"
11. "The Crusher"
12. "Surf City"
13. "Blitzkrieg Bop (Live)"
14. "Rock and Roll Radio (Live)"
15. "Sheena Is a Punk Rocker (Live)"
16. "Rock & Roll High School (Live)"
17. "Rockaway Beach (Live)"
18. "Bonzo Goes to Bitburg (Live)"
19. "Wart Hog (Live)"
20. "Merry Christmas (I Don't Want To Fight Tonight)"

The tracks on this compilation are taken from the following Ramones albums:

- 1, 2, 4, 20 – Brain Drain (1989)
- 3, 5, 6, 7, 8, 9 – Mondo Bizarro (1992)
- 10, 12 – Acid Eaters (1993)
- 11 – ¡Adios Amigos! (1995)
- 13, 14, 15, 16, 17, 18, 19 – Loco Live (1991)
