= Garrett Uhlenbrock =

American songwriter

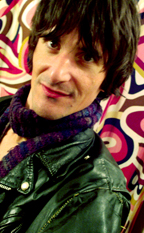
- Uhlenbrock in 2009

Background information
- Also known as: Skinny Bones
- Born: Garrett James Uhlenbrock; 21 August 1964 (age 61)
- Genres: Punk rock
- Occupations: Musician, Songwriter, Record Producer, Audio Engineer
- Instruments: Guitar, slide guitar
- Years active: 1989 - Present
- Labels: Radioactive Records, Capitol Records, V2 Records, Nicotine Records, EMI Records, Chrysalis Records, MCA Records, Beggars Banquet

Garrett Uhlenbrock (born Garrett James Uhlenbrock, 21 August 1964) is an American punk rock musician, songwriter and audio engineer best known for co-writing songs for the New York based band, the Ramones.

Record producer Bill Laswell introduced Uhlenbrock to Dee Dee Ramone in 1989. In 1990 Uhlenbrock and Dee Dee Ramone co wrote the first version of "Poison Heart". Uhlenbrock wrote "The Job That Ate My Brain", and "Anxiety" with Marky Ramone for Mondo Bizarro, which was released in 1992.

In 1995, Uhlenbrock and Marky Ramone co-wrote "Have A Nice Day", which was recorded by the Ramones for the ¡Adios Amigos! album (RARD11273 Radioactive Records). "Anxiety" and "Have A Nice Day" were the shortest songs on both records.

In 1996, Uhlenbrock engineered and played guitar on the album, About to Choke, by Vic Chesnutt for Capitol Records. Two years later he engineered and played slide guitar on the V2 Records album, Deserter's Songs, by Mercury Rev.

In 1996, he and Marky Ramone founded the band called Marky Ramone and the Intruders. That same year they released the self-titled album on Blackout! Records (engineered by Uhlenbrock and produced by Marky Ramone, Skinny Bones and Mark Neuman). The cover art of this album is an advertising poster for the 1958 science fiction movie, Attack of the 50 ft. Woman. In November 1996, the band went to Brazil, and opened for the Sex Pistols during their first reunion tour "Filthy Lucre Tour". In 1999, their second album The Answer to Your Problems? was recorded. One song featured guest vocals by Joan Jett.

In 2009, Uhlenbrock recorded Shot My TV with his group the Gonedaddys for the Italian punk label, Nicotine Records.

In 2024 Uhlenbrock recorded Season of the Peach by Black Lips at Oakley Munsons' SAM recording studio in New Yorks' Catskill Mountains

In 2024 Uhlenbrock recorded "Alex Bell" for a live Guided By Voices record titled Goodnight El Dorado
