= Ramones Museum =

Museum dedicated to the band the Ramones in Berlin, Germany

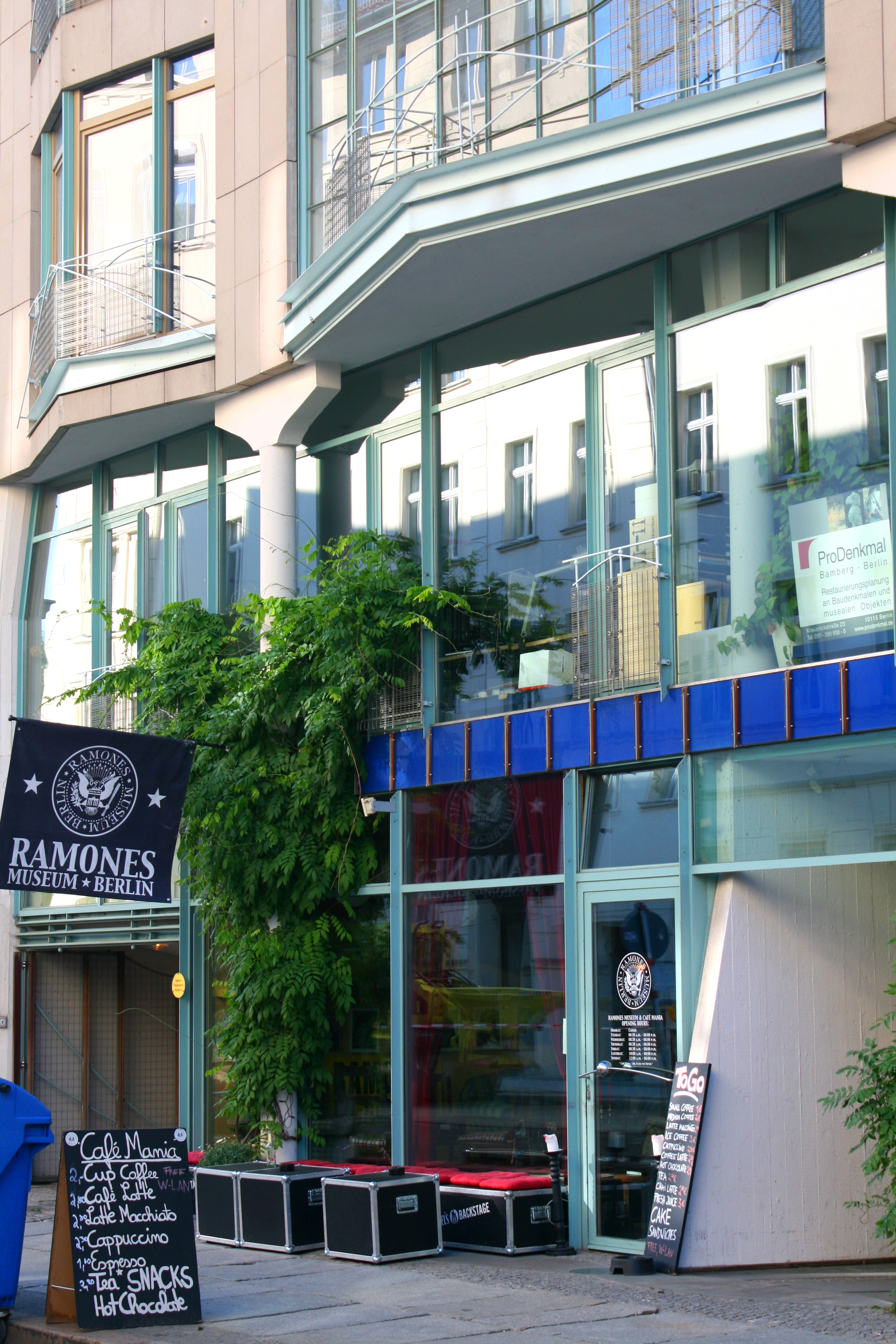
- Established: September 15, 2005; 19 years ago
- Founder: Flo Hayler
- Website: ramonesmuseum.com

The Ramones Museum is a museum dedicated to the American punk rock band the Ramones, which was formerly located in the Kreuzberg borough of Berlin, Germany and is now situated in the Friedrichshain district. While the Ramones are most closely associated with their hometown of New York City, bassist Dee Dee Ramone grew up in Berlin, and the city, and Germany as a whole, was mentioned in numerous Ramones songs.

Originally opening in 2005 in Kreuzberg, the museum moved to Mitte in 2008, then moved back to Kreuzberg in 2017, before relocating to Friedrichshain in 2024. The Kreuzberg site was also used as an occasional concert venue.

In 2014, the museum started releasing records, the first being a split between the Zatopeks and Dee Cracks.

== Layout ==
The museum has more than 1,000 objects of memorabilia originating from the band members themselves, including clothing, set lists, gear, and promotional items of the Ramones from the years 1975–1996. Many of the items were collected by museum founder Flo Hayler, and initially stored in his apartment.

== Live performances ==
After moving to its Kreuzberg location, the museum hosted live performances by bands, starting with Alkaline Trio doing an acoustic set in 2009. Later that year, C.J. Ramone became the first Ramone to perform at the museum. Other acts that have played include Against Me!, Anti-Flag, Brian Fallon, Dave Hause, Dead To Me, The Flatliners, Franz Nicolay, Hop Along, Jet, Mikey Erg (who released a free download of his set on bandcamp), Riverboat Gamblers, Slingshot Dakota, Smoke or Fire, The Static Age, The Subways, and Youth Brigade.

== See also ==
- List of music museums
