= Morrissey Curates The Ramones =

Greatest hits album by The Ramones
- Released: November 28, 2014
- Recorded: 1976–1980
- Genre: Punk rock
- Label: Rhino Records

Ramones compilation album chronology
Essential (2007)	Morrissey Curates The Ramones (2014)

Morrissey Curates The Ramones is a compilation album by the American punk rock band the Ramones, compiled by British musician Morrissey. It consists primarily of songs from their first four albums, Ramones, Leave Home, Rocket to Russia, and Road to Ruin. While Morrissey initially wrote a negative review of the Ramones 1976 debut album in Melody Maker, he was invited by the band's management to pick the tracks for the compilation. The album was released on vinyl on November 28, 2014, and limited to 9,000 copies.

== Track listing ==
1. "Sheena Is a Punk Rocker" – (Joey Ramone)
2. "Rockaway Beach" – (Dee Dee Ramone)
3. "I Wanna Be Sedated" – (Joey Ramone)
4. "Suzy Is a Headbanger" – (Dee Dee Ramone, Joey Ramone)
5. "Loudmouth" – (Dee Dee Ramone, Johnny Ramone)
6. "Pinhead" – (Dee Dee Ramone)
7. "Babysitter" – (Joey Ramone)
8. "Judy Is a Punk" – (Joey Ramone)
9. "I Remember You" – (Joey Ramone)
10. "Here Today, Gone Tomorrow" – (Ramones)
11. "Carbona Not Glue" – (Dee Dee Ramone)
12. "Beat on the Brat" – (Joey Ramone)
13. "Teenage Lobotomy" – (Ramones)
14. "Cretin Hop" – (Ramones)
15. "Blitzkrieg Bop" – (Tommy Ramone, Dee Dee Ramone)
16. "Why Is it Always This Way?" – (Ramones)
17. "Rock & Roll High School" – (Johnny Ramone, Dee Dee Ramone, Joey Ramone)

== Personnel ==
- Joey Ramone – lead vocals
- Johnny Ramone – guitar
- Dee Dee Ramone – bass guitar, backing vocals
- Tommy Ramone – drums
- Marky Ramone – drums
