= Palisades Park (Freddy Cannon song) =

1962 Freddy Cannon song

- The original hit recording by Freddy Cannon

Single by Freddy Cannon

from the album Palisades Park
- B-side: "June, July and August"
- Released: April 1962
- Genre: Rock and roll
- Length: 1:53
- Label: Swan
- Songwriter: Chuck Barris

Freddy Cannon singles chronology
"Teen Queen of the Week" (1962)	"Palisades Park" (1962)	"What's Gonna Happen When Summer's Done" (1962)

"Palisades Park" is a song written by Chuck Barris and recorded by Freddy Cannon.

== Background ==
Barris wrote a song about an amusement park and it was suggested he use the name of an amusement park as the title. One night in Manhattan he looked toward the New Jersey Palisades Cliffs, on which the Palisades Amusement Park sat, and the title was selected. The song is an up-tempo rock and roll tune led by a distinctive organ part (played by Bob Gaudio). The track also incorporates amusement park sound effects, including the sounds of screaming riders on the roller coasters, and the quoting of a slower version of "Entrance of the Gladiators", played on an organ imitating a hurdy-gurdy or calliope. In the song, the singer takes a walk after dark and discovers Palisades Park, where he meets and falls in love with a girl. Among the list of rides and attractions listed in the song are: Shoot the Chute, Rocket Ship, Roller Coaster, Loop the Loop, Merry Go Round, Tunnel of Love, and the Ferris Wheel.

== Chart performance ==
Released by Swan Records as a B-side to "June, July and August," "Palisades Park" broke in when a Flint, Michigan, radio DJ played it by mistake. It peaked at #3 on the Billboard Hot 100 on 23–30 June 1962. On the Hot R&B Sides chart, the song went to #15. "Palisades Park" was the biggest hit of Cannon's career. In Canada it reached #2.

== Cover versions ==
- The song was covered as an album track by Shelley Fabares on her 1962 album The Things We Did Last Summer
- Jan and Dean covered it on their album Jan & Dean's Golden Hits in 1962.
- It was subsequently recorded by Gary Lewis and the Playboys in 1965 on their album A Session With Gary Lewis And the Playboys
- The Beach Boys included it on their 1976 album 15 Big Ones. The song had previously been the source of inspiration for two other Beach Boys songs, "County Fair" (1962) and "Amusement Parks U.S.A." (1965). Brian Wilson said of their rendition, "I looked at the guys, and they looked kinda sad. They didn't look happy; they looked like something was wrong. I said to myself, 'Hey maybe they're upset because we're not having any hit singles! Maybe they're mad at me!' I checked into it, and sure enough, as soon as we did 'Palisades,' everybody was happy again. Know what I mean?"
- New York-based punk band The Ramones released their cover of Palisades Park on their 1989 album Brain Drain. It was also included on the Chrysalis Records 1991 release of their live album Loco Live, but was not on the album's 1992 Sire Records re-release.
- In addition, the song was performed live by The Stompers, a Boston-based band with members from Lynn, Massachusetts (Cannon's home town, although he was born in Swampscott, Massachusetts) beginning in the late 1970s. However, the group only recorded the track on a live album released in 1994.
- New York City garage punk band The Devil Dogs included the song on its 1990 12"EP, Big Beef Bonanza.
