= The Best of the Ramones =

Greatest hits album by the Ramones
- Released: May 25, 2004
- Recorded: 1989–1995
- Genre: Punk rock
- Label: Disky
- Producer: Jean Beauvoir; Bill Laswell; Daniel Rey; Ed Stasium; Scott Hackwith

Ramones compilation album chronology
| Loud, Fast Ramones: Their Toughest Hits (2002) | The Best of the Ramones (2004) | Weird Tales of the Ramones (2005) |

Professional ratings
Review scores
| Source | Rating |
|---|---|
| Allmusic | 2/5 stars |

The Best of the Ramones is a re-release of the 2002 Ramones compilation album Best of the Chrysalis Years, but with a new title, cover, and track sequence. The album was released May 25, 2004, on Disky Records, and is not available in the United States.

== Track listing ==
1. "Pet Sematary" (Dee Dee Ramone, Daniel Rey) – 3:28
2. "Don't Bust My Chops" (Dee Dee Ramone, Daniel Rey) – 2:30
3. "Ignorance Is Bliss" (Joey Ramone, A. Schernoff) – 2:39
4. "Poison Heart" (Ramones) – 4:05
5. "Anxiety" (Ramones) – 2:06
6. "Take It as It Comes" (Frazier, Ruby Turner, White) – 2:08
7. "Out of Time" (Mick Jagger, Keith Richards) – 2:41
8. "Somebody to Love" (Darby Slick) – 2:33
9. "I Don't Want to Grow Up" (Tom Waits, Kathleen Brennan) – 2:46
10. "Got A Lot To Say" (C.J. Ramone)
11. "Sheena Is a Punk Rocker (Live)" (Joey Ramone)
12. "Surfin' Bird (Live)" (Al Frazier/Sonny Harris/Carl White/Turner Wilson)
13. "Cretin Hop (Live)" (The Ramones)
14. "Rockaway Beach (Live)" (Dee Dee Ramone)
15. "I Wanna Be Sedated (Live)" (Joey Ramone)
16. "Rock and Roll Radio (Live)" (Joey Ramone)
17. "Blitzkrieg Bop (Live)" (Tommy Ramone/Dee Dee Ramone)
18. "Teenage Lobotomy (Live)" (The Ramones)
