= Hey Ho Let's Go: Greatest Hits =

Hey Ho Lets Go: Greatest Hits

Greatest hits album by Ramones
- Released: June 5, 2006
- Recorded: 1976–1989
- Genre: Punk rock
- Length: 57:09
- Label: Warner Bros.
- Producer: See the single albums

Ramones compilation albums chronology
| Weird Tales of the Ramones (2005) | Hey Ho Lets Go: Greatest Hits (2006) | Essential (2007) |

Professional ratings
Review scores
| Source | Rating |
|---|---|
| Allmusic | 4.5/5 stars |

Greatest Hits is a 2006 compilation album by the punk rock band Ramones. It was issued one year after the box set Weird Tales of the Ramones, and four years after the single-disc collection Loud, Fast Ramones: Their Toughest Hits. The album contains songs recorded during 1976–1989.

== Track listing ==
Hey Ho Let's Go track listing
| No. | Title | Writer(s) | Source album | Length |
|---|---|---|---|---|
| 1. | "Blitzkrieg Bop" | Tommy Ramone, Dee Dee Ramone | Ramones | 2:12 |
| 2. | "Beat on the Brat" | Joey Ramone | Ramones | 2:32 |
| 3. | "Judy Is a Punk" | Joey | Ramones | 1:32 |
| 4. | "I Wanna Be Your Boyfriend" | Tommy | Ramones | 2:26 |
| 5. | "Sheena Is a Punk Rocker" (ABC Single Version) | Joey | Rocket to Russia | 2:47 |
| 6. | "Pinhead" | Dee Dee | Leave Home | 2:44 |
| 7. | "Commando" | Dee Dee | Leave Home | 1:52 |
| 8. | "Rockaway Beach" | Dee Dee | Rocket to Russia | 2:06 |
| 9. | "We're a Happy Family" | Joey | Rocket to Russia | 2:39 |
| 10. | "Cretin Hop" | Tommy, Dee Dee, Johnny Ramone | Rocket to Russia | 1:55 |
| 11. | "Teenage Lobotomy" | Dee Dee | Rocket to Russia | 2:01 |
| 12. | "I Wanna Be Sedated" | Joey | Road to Ruin | 2:29 |
| 13. | "I Just Want to Have Something to Do" | Joey | Road to Ruin | 2:41 |
| 14. | "Rock 'n' Roll High School" (Ed Stasium Mix) | Joey | Rock 'n' Roll High School | 2:19 |
| 15. | "Baby, I Love You" (The Ronettes cover) | Phil Spector, Jeff Barry, Ellie Greenwich | End of the Century | 3:44 |
| 16. | "Do You Remember Rock 'n' Roll Radio?" | Joey | End of the Century | 3:49 |
| 17. | "The KKK Took My Baby Away" | Joey | Pleasant Dreams | 2:30 |
| 18. | "Outsider" | Dee Dee | Subterranean Jungle | 2:10 |
| 19. | "Pet Sematary" (Single Version) | Dee Dee, Daniel Rey | Brain Drain | 3:32 |
| 20. | "Wart Hog" | Dee Dee, Johnny | Too Tough to Die | 1:54 |

== Charts ==
Chart performance for Hey Ho Let's Go: Greatest Hits
| Chart (2024) | Peak position |
|---|---|
| Hungarian Physical Albums (MAHASZ) | 34 |

== Certifications ==
| Region | Certification | Certified units/sales |
|---|---|---|
| United Kingdom (BPI) | Gold | 100,000^{‡} |
^{‡} Sales+streaming figures based on certification alone.
