= Commando (book) =

2012 autobiography by Johnny Ramone

- Author: Johnny Ramone
- Language: English
- Subject: Autobiography
- Published: 2012 (Abrams Image)
- Publication place: United States
- Pages: 176
- ISBN: 978-0-810-99660-1

Commando is the autobiography of guitarist and songwriter Johnny Ramone of the punk rock band the Ramones. The book was released in 2012 by Linda Ramone, surviving spouse of Johnny Ramone, following the death of Johnny in 2004 from prostate cancer.

== Content ==
Commando is an autobiography on the life of Johnny Ramone. He began writing the book in 1999 when he was diagnosed with prostate cancer. In an interview with Billboard, Linda Ramone stated:

It is a really powerful book because his whole life has gone before him and he knows it's going to come to an end, and he really needs to tell everybody what he's feeling inside, so that's what makes it so amazing. That is the biggest, most powerful thing, writing a book when you know you're dying.

The book is 176 pages and contains pictures that were chosen by Linda Ramone. It contains musings from Johnny's childhood and personal stories of his life and time with the Ramones. Events he includes in the book are his admission to getting a New York City police officer to release mace into an audience at a Ramones concert. Additional events include him beating up Sex Pistols manager Malcolm McLaren as well as his bandmates Joey and Dee Dee. The book also covers his relationship with his wife Linda and the events surrounding her initially dating Joey before she left Joey for Johnny.

The epilogue was written by Lisa Marie Presley, a close friend of Johnny and Linda Ramone. The foreword of the book was written by the only surviving original member of the Ramones at that time, Tommy Ramone. Tommy was quoted as saying:

[the book] is a no holds barred, straight-forward book written in a no-nonsense style that is Johnny personified. His story is written in his own actual words, so the reader gets an insight into what made him the unique, charismatic and exciting individual that he was. It also gives a great view of The Ramones from Johnny's perspective.

== Reception ==
The book was released in April 2012. Prior to and following the release, Linda Ramone promoted the book by giving numerous interviews in both print and televised national media, including Fox News, Billboard Magazine, and MTV. The book was reviewed by numerous well known publications including the Houston Chronicle, the National Post, PopMatters, and MTV, which called the book a must-have for any Ramones fan.
