= Acid Eaters =

Studio album of cover songs by the Ramones
- Released: December 1, 1993
- Recorded: 1993
- Studios: Baby Monster (New York City); Chung King (New York City)
- Genre: Punk rock
- Length: 30:53
- Label: Radioactive
- Producer: Scott Hackwith

Ramones chronology
Mondo Bizarro (1992)	Acid Eaters (1993)	¡Adios Amigos! (1995)

Professional ratings
Review scores
Source	Rating
AllMusic	2/5 stars
Robert Christgau	(1-star Honorable Mention)
Entertainment Weekly	A−
Rock Hard	8.0/10
Rolling Stone	3/5 stars
Spin Alternative Record Guide	7/10
Uncut	4/5 stars

Acid Eaters is the thirteenth studio album by the American punk rock band Ramones.

Released in 1993, towards the end of the Ramones' career, the album is the band's only album entirely composed of covers. Acid Eaters forms a musical tribute to the Ramones' favorite artists of the 1960s and highlights the influences the Ramones took from garage rock bands like the Seeds and the Amboy Dukes, as well as from popular bands such as the Beach Boys, the Who and the Rolling Stones (all of whom are covered on this album).

== Background ==
Although Acid Eaters is specifically made of covers from the sixties, it was not the first time that the Ramones had played or recorded cover songs, with the band having released cover versions on most of their albums, almost all of them from the sixties, starting with a cover of Chris Montez's hit "Let's Dance" (written by and credited to Jim Lee) on their debut album. Other notable covers previously performed by the group include: the Rivieras' "California Sun" (originally recorded by Joe Jones); the Beach Boys' "Do You Wanna Dance?" (originally recorded by Bobby Freeman); the Trashmen's "Surfin' Bird"; the Searchers' "Needles and Pins" (written by Sonny Bono and Jack Nitzsche, originally recorded by Jackie DeShannon); the Ronettes' "Baby, I Love You"; the Music Explosion's "Little Bit O' Soul"; the Chambers Brothers' "Time Has Come Today"; Freddy Cannon's "Palisades Park"; and the Doors' "Take It as It Comes". Jan and Dean's "Surf City" had been performed live by the Ramones on one occasion on August 20, 1982, in New York City, but makes its studio debut here.

== Production ==
Scott Hackwith, the frontman for the alternative rock band Dig, produced Acid Eaters. It was the first time the Ramones had worked with him.

In his 2012 autobiography Commando, Johnny Ramone called the album "hit-and-miss", stating that many of the songs "were done with studio work, arrangements, and tricks, which was really different for us", and that the band "experimented to mixed success". He added that "we were getting all kinds of suggestions from everybody, and it was getting to be a pain in the ass. I mean, 'She's Not There' by the Zombies?" Johnny awarded the album a "B−" grade. Bassist C.J. Ramone gave the album a "D" grade, saying that it was done strictly for the money.

The album features several guest singers on backing vocals, namely Pete Townshend on "Substitute", Sebastian Bach on "Out of Time" and Traci Lords on "Somebody to Love". According to Johnny Ramone, while he considered Townshend "one of the greats and one of my guitar heroes", Townshend was a half an hour late for his session, resulting in Johnny giving up and leaving the studio to watch a Yankee game.

According to C.J. Ramone, Acid Eaters was only going to be an EP before manager Gary Kurfirst promised a bigger advance as well as a bigger cut if they made it a full release.

== Promotion ==
The band promoted the album on the animated Cartoon Network talk show Space Ghost Coast to Coast, in the first-season episode "Bobcat".

== Track listing ==
Side one
No.	Title	Writer(s)	Length
1.	"Journey to the Center of the Mind" (Original by the Amboy Dukes)	Ted Nugent, Steve Farmer	2:52
2.	"Substitute" (Original by the Who)	Pete Townshend	3:15
3.	"Out of Time" (Original by the Rolling Stones, a hit for Chris Farlowe)	Mick Jagger, Keith Richards	2:41
4.	"The Shape of Things to Come" (Original by Max Frost and the Troopers)	Barry Mann, Cynthia Weil	1:46
5.	"Somebody to Love" (Original by the Great Society, popularized by Jefferson Airplane)	Darby Slick	2:31
6.	"When I Was Young" (Original by the Animals)	Eric Burdon, John Weider, Vic Briggs, Danny McCulloch, Barry Jenkins	3:16

Side two
No.	Title	Writer(s)	Length
7.	"7 and 7 Is" (Original by Love)	Arthur Lee	1:50
8.	"My Back Pages" (Original by Bob Dylan, popularized by the Byrds)	Bob Dylan	2:27
9.	"Can't Seem to Make You Mine" (Original by the Seeds)	Sky Saxon	2:42
10.	"Have You Ever Seen the Rain?" (Original by Creedence Clearwater Revival)	John Fogerty	2:22
11.	"I Can't Control Myself" (Original by the Troggs)	Reg Presley	2:55
12.	"Surf City" (Original by Jan and Dean)	Brian Wilson, Jan Berry	2:26

CD Bonus track in Japan and Brazil
No.	Title	Writer(s)	Length
13.	"Surfin' Safari" (Original by the Beach Boys)	Brian Wilson, Mike Love	1:47

== Personnel ==
Ramones

- Joey Ramone – lead vocals (tracks 2, 3, 5–7, 9–13)
- Johnny Ramone – guitar
- Marky Ramone – drums
- C.J. Ramone – bass guitar, lead vocals (tracks 1, 4, 8)

Additional musicians

- Joe McGinty – keyboards
- Pete Townshend – backing vocals (track 2)
- Sebastian Bach – backing vocals (track 3)
- Traci Lords – backing vocals (track 5)

Technical

- Scott Hackwith – producer, mixing
- Gary Kurfirst – executive producer
- Trent Slatton – engineer, mixing
- Bryce Goggin – assistant engineer (Baby Monster)
- Rojo – assistant engineer (Baby Monster)
- Johnny Wydrycs – assistant engineer (Chung King)
- Jack Hersca – assistant engineer (Chung King)
- Diego Garrido – assistant engineer (Chung King)
- Peter Beckerman – assistant engineer (Sound on Sound)
- Scott Hull – mastering

== Charts ==
Chart (1993–94)	Peak position
Canada Top Albums/CDs (RPM)	48
Finnish Albums (The Official Finnish Charts)	25
Japanese Albums (Oricon)	85
Swedish Albums (Sverigetopplistan)	26
US Billboard 200	179

Chart (2025)	Peak position
Croatian International Albums (HDU)	24

== Certifications ==
Region	Certification	Certified units/sales
Argentina (CAPIF)	Gold	30,000^{^}
^{^} Shipments figures based on certification alone.
