= Mondo Bizarro =

Studio album by the Ramones
- Released: September 1, 1992
- Recorded: January–February 1992
- Studios: Magic Shop, New York City; Baby Monster, New York City
- Genre: Punk rock
- Length: 37:25
- Label: Radioactive
- Producer: Ed Stasium

Ramones chronology
Brain Drain (1989)	Mondo Bizarro (1992)	Acid Eaters (1993)

Singles from Mondo Bizarro
- 1. "Poison Heart" Released: 1992; 2. "Strength to Endure" Released: 1992 (promo); 3. "Touring" Released: 1992 (promo)

Professional ratings
Review scores
Source	Rating
AllMusic	3.5/5 stars
Robert Christgau	A−
Entertainment Weekly	B−
Q	3/5 stars
Rock Hard	6.0/10
Rolling Stone	3/5 stars
Spin Alternative Record Guide	6/10

Mondo Bizarro (a misspelled version of "Mondo Bizzarro", meaning "Weird World" in Italian) is the twelfth studio album by American punk rock band Ramones, released on September 1, 1992, by Radioactive Records. It is the first studio album to feature their new bassist, C.J. Ramone, who replaced original member Dee Dee Ramone (although he is still featured on this album and the band's subsequent albums as a songwriter). The album was re-released in the UK by the Captain Oi! record label on August 10, 2004, with the band's cover of the Spider-Man theme song included as a bonus track.

Clocking in at 37 minutes and 25 seconds, Mondo Bizarro has the longest running time of any Ramones studio album.

== Background ==
Mondo Bizarro was the Ramones' first studio album in three years, after the band left Sire Records for a new contract with Radioactive Records. The title was taken from the film of the same name, a 1966 sequel to the film Mondo Cane.

In his 1998 autobiography, Dee Dee Ramone noted that, while he had left the band, he sold them the publishing for three new compositions—"Poison Heart", "Main Man" and "Strength to Endure"—to pay for a lawyer to help get him out of jail, following an arrest for possession of marijuana. He added, "I don't know why no one in New York, or none of the Ramones, couldn't have loaned me a few thousand dollars, instead of forcing me to go through all the paranoia, confusion and extra pain of a maneuver like that. [...] It seemed that the Ramones couldn't live without me, but at the same time they treated me like an enemy." "Poison Heart" and "Strength to Endure" were released as the album's singles, in June and October 1992, respectively.

In a 1992 interview for an Argentinian newspaper, Johnny Ramone said of the album, "Generally I always find two or three songs that I hate. From Mondo Bizarro, I really like almost all the songs and I am very satisfied with the result." However, when he was interviewed about the album for the 2003 documentary End of the Century, he stated, "I don't like it. I don't like it at all." In Johnny's 2012 autobiography, Commando, he awarded the album (along with its predecessor, 1989's Brain Drain) a "C" grade, stating, "we needed more Dee Dee songs on it. [...] The songs are the weak spots on the album. [...] C.J. was in the band, but his writing wasn't up to par yet."

== Songs ==
The song "Censorshit" was written by Joey Ramone about how rock and rap albums were being censored by the Parents Music Resource Center, a group of politicians' wives who sought to put parental advisory warning labels on records, a practice which has since become standard. It refers to Ozzy Osbourne and Frank Zappa in the line, "Ask Ozzy, Zappa, or me, we'll show you what it's like to be free." The song is addressed to Tipper Gore, who was the wife of then-Tennessee Senator and eventual Vice President of the United States, Al Gore. In his book Commando, Johnny Ramone stated that he "didn't like the lyrics on 'Censorshit.' It was stupid. I liked the song, though. Joey wrote this song about Vice President Al Gore's wife, Tipper Gore, then he went on and voted for Bill Clinton."

"Heidi Is a Headcase" was written by Joey Ramone and Daniel Rey. According to an interview on the podcast Ramones of the Day, C.J. Ramone stated that the song was about a girl named Heidi, whom both Joey and C.J. had dated for a period of time.

"Take It as It Comes" is a cover song, originally recorded by the Doors for their 1967 debut album. The 2004 CD reissue bonus track, "Spiderman", is a cover of the theme song from the original Spider-Man animated series. It was originally released as an unlisted bonus track on initial releases of the Ramones' 1995 album ¡Adios Amigos! (omitted on later editions), and a slightly different version was available on the 1995 various artists compilation album Saturday Morning: Cartoons' Greatest Hits.

"I Won't Let It Happen" borrows some lyrics lines and part of the title from the Slade B-side "I Won't Let it 'Appen Agen" from 1972.

== Reception ==
Although Mondo Bizarro was considered to be a "comeback" for the Ramones—following both lineup and label changes, and the dwindling sales of their previous albums from the mid-to-late 1980s (up to and including Brain Drain, which was originally meant to be the band's "comeback")—the album peaked at number 190 on the Billboard 200 chart, the lowest chart position in their career. However, the album's lead single, "Poison Heart", did become one of the Ramones' top ten hits in their native America, peaking at number six on the Billboard Modern Rock Tracks chart. The album was certified gold in Brazil in 1994.

Robert Christgau, who gave it a positive review, stated: "More like an old country singer (George Jones leaving Epic, say) than the world's greatest rock and roll band (greater than Mick's side project, anyway), Joey and whoever [...] do right by their formula. Reasons to believe: the Dee Dee ballad Joey sings, and the Beach Boys tribute that goes, 'Touring, touring, it's never boring.'"

== Track listing ==
Barbed Side
No.	Title	Writer(s)	Length
1.	"Censorshit"	Joey Ramone	3:13
2.	"The Job That Ate My Brain"	Marky Ramone, Garrett Uhlenbrock	2:17
3.	"Poison Heart"	Dee Dee Ramone, Daniel Rey	4:04
4.	"Anxiety"	Marky Ramone, Uhlenbrock	2:04
5.	"Strength to Endure"	Dee Dee Ramone, Rey	2:59
6.	"It's Gonna Be Alright"	Joey Ramone, Andy Shernoff	3:20

Wired Side
No.	Title	Writer(s)	Length
1.	"Take It as It Comes" (The Doors cover)	Jim Morrison, John Densmore, Robby Krieger, Ray Manzarek	2:07
2.	"Main Man"	Dee Dee Ramone, Rey	3:29
3.	"Tomorrow She Goes Away"	Joey Ramone, Rey	2:41
4.	"I Won't Let It Happen"	Joey Ramone, Shernoff	2:22
5.	"Cabbies on Crack"	Joey Ramone	3:01
6.	"Heidi Is a Headcase"	Joey Ramone, Rey	2:57
7.	"Touring"	Joey Ramone	2:51

Bonus track on 2004 editions onward
No.	Title	Writer(s)	Length
8.	"Spiderman"	Bob Harris, Paul Francis Webster	1:56

== Personnel ==
Ramones

- Joey Ramone – lead vocals (except "Strength to Endure" and "Main Man")
- Johnny Ramone – guitar
- Marky Ramone – drums
- C.J. Ramone – bass guitar, lead vocals on "Strength to Endure" and "Main Man"

Additional musicians

- Vernon Reid – guitar solo on "Cabbies on Crack"
- Joe McGinty – keyboards on "Take It as It Comes"
- Flo & Eddie – backing vocals on "Poison Heart" and "Touring"
- Daniel Rey – additional guitar (uncredited)
- Andy Shernoff – additional guitar (uncredited)
- Ed Stasium – additional guitar (uncredited)

Technical

- Ed Stasium – producer, mixing
- Gary Kurfirst – executive producer
- Paul Hamingson – engineer, mixing assistant
- Greg Calbi – mastering
- Joe Warda – assistant engineer (The Magic Shop)
- Bryce Goggin – assistant engineer (Baby Monster)
- Garris Shipon – assistant engineer (Baby Monster)
- UE Nastasi – assistant mixing engineer (East Hill)
- George DuBose – art direction, photography, design

== Charts ==
=== Album ===
Chart (1992)	Peak position
Australian Albums (ARIA)	93
Finnish Albums (The Official Finnish Charts)	11
Japanese Albums (Oricon)	69
Swedish Albums (Sverigetopplistan)	41
US Billboard 200	190

Chart (2025)	Peak position
Croatian International Albums (HDU)	32

=== Singles ===
Year	Single	Chart	Position
1992	"Poison Heart"	Modern Rock Tracks	6

== Certifications ==
Region	Certification	Certified units/sales
Argentina (CAPIF)	Gold	30,000^{^}
Brazil (Pro-Música Brasil)	Gold	100,000^{*}
^{*} Sales figures based on certification alone.^{^} Shipments figures based on certification alone.
