= Brain Drain (album) =

Studio album by the Ramones
- Released: May 23, 1989
- Recorded: December 1988 – March 1989 ("Merry Christmas" recorded in 1987)
- Studio: Sorcerer Sound; Quad Recording; B.C. Studio; Sigma Sound; (New York City)
- Genre: Punk rock; Pop Punk
- Length: 35:02
- Label: Sire
- Producer: Bill Laswell; Jean Beauvoir; Daniel Rey

Ramones chronology
Halfway to Sanity (1987)	Brain Drain (1989)	Mondo Bizarro (1992)

Singles from Brain Drain
- 1. "Pet Sematary" Released: June 1989; 2. "I Believe in Miracles" Released: November 1989 (German promo)

Professional ratings
Review scores
Source	Rating
AllMusic	2/5 stars
Robert Christgau	B
Spin Alternative Record Guide	2/10

Brain Drain is the eleventh studio album by the American punk rock band Ramones, released on May 23, 1989. It is the last Ramones release to feature bassist/songwriter/vocalist Dee Dee Ramone, the first to feature Marky Ramone since his initial firing from the band after 1983's Subterranean Jungle and the band's last studio album on Sire Records. This was also the last Ramones album to be produced by Daniel Rey, until 1995's ¡Adios Amigos! The album ends with their unlikely seasonal song "Merry Christmas (I Don't Want to Fight Tonight)".

== Background ==
In his 1998 autobiography, Dee Dee Ramone recalled: "It was tough recording the Brain Drain album because everyone took their shit out on me. I dreaded being around them. It drove me away—I didn't even end up playing on the album. Everybody in the band had problems; girlfriend problems, money problems, mental problems."

Johnny Ramone expressed similarly unfavorable sentiments in his 2012 posthumous autobiography, Commando, calling it one of his least favorite albums. He elaborated, "Bill Laswell's production is too dense; he had me record the guitars on five or six tracks. So the album took too much time, and there were too many Joey songs on it, which always took more time". However, he added that the album "has a couple of bright spots, like 'I Believe in Miracles' and 'Punishment Fits the Crime.'" He awarded both the Brain Drain album and its follow-up, Mondo Bizarro, a "C" letter grade.

For the first time on a Ramones album, drummer Marky Ramone participated in the songwriting, contributing lyrics to "All Screwed Up" and "Learn to Listen".

== Songs ==
"Palisades Park" is a cover song, originally recorded by Freddy Cannon in 1962.

"Pet Sematary" was written for the Stephen King movie adaptation of the same name and was issued as a single, becoming one of the Ramones' biggest radio hits and a staple of their concerts during the 1990s. Two versions exist of the song: the original recording produced by Jean Beauvoir and Daniel Rey, which ended up on the album (and on most pressings of the single), and the 'Bill Laswell version', a not very different take, with the most evident difference in the refrain not including any keyboard and in the end of the song with the drums being quite different. The Laswell version was released as a UK single in September 1989. Dee Dee appears as the bassist in both of the music videos for "Pet Sematary", while the videos for "I Believe In Miracles" and "Merry Christmas (I Don't Want to Fight Tonight)" feature his replacement, C. J. Ramone.

"Merry Christmas (I Don't Want to Fight Tonight)" was originally released in November 1987 as the B-side of the single "I Wanna Live". It was later included in the 2004 film Christmas with the Kranks.

"Can't Get You Outta My Mind" dates back to the early 1980s, where it was first recorded during sessions for the Ramones' 1981 album Pleasant Dreams. That version remained unreleased until it featured as a bonus track on the 2002 reissue of Pleasant Dreams.

== Reception ==
Brain Drain was originally intended to be a "comeback" album for the Ramones, following the belated success of "I Wanna Be Sedated"; however, despite some good reviews, the album failed to live up to commercial expectations, peaking at number 122 on the Billboard 200 chart. Nonetheless, the album's first single, "Pet Sematary", became the band's highest-charting hit in the US, peaking at number four on the Billboard Modern Rock Tracks chart.

Robert Christgau stated: "Laswellization neither saves their souls for rock and roll nor turns them into a metal band. First side's basically Dee Dee, period-hopping from the pleasantly dreamy 'I Believe in Miracles' to the East Coast surf cover 'Palisades Park.' Second side's basically Joey, pushing the envelope on 'Ignorance Is Bliss,' going flat on 'Come Back, Baby.' For professionalism, not bad."

== Cover versions ==
"I Believe in Miracles" was covered by Eddie Vedder and Zeke for the 2003 album We're a Happy Family: A Tribute to Ramones and is frequently covered by Pearl Jam at their shows.

"Pet Sematary" was performed live by German industrial metal band Rammstein (in conjunction with Clawfinger) and was released as a B-side to their single "Ich will" in 2001. Rammstein was joined onstage by Marky Ramone, C.J. Ramone and Jerry Only of the Misfits when performing the song in New York as a tribute to Joey Ramone, who had died three months prior. The song was later covered by psychobilly band the Creepshow as a bonus track for their second album, Run For Your Life, in 2008. It was also performed by the Plain White T's for the 2012 film Frankenweenie (Unleashed). The end credits of the 2019 version of the film Pet Sematary include a cover version of the title track by the American punk rock band Starcrawler. English rock band Creeper made an acoustic version of the song for their 2021 EP Sounds from the Void.

"Merry Christmas (I Don't Want to Fight Tonight)" was covered by Joey Ramone on his posthumous EP, Christmas Spirit... In My House, and by artists such as Smash Mouth (2005), the Smithereens (2007), Asobi Seksu (2007), Vetiver (2010), Cheap Trick (2017), Little Steven and the Disciples of Soul (2017), Mattiel (2019), L.A. Guns (2019), and Lucinda Williams (2020).

== Track listing ==
Side one
No.	Title	Writer(s)	Length
1.	"I Believe in Miracles"	Dee Dee Ramone, Daniel Rey	3:19
2.	"Zero Zero UFO"	D. Ramone, Rey	2:25
3.	"Don't Bust My Chops"	D. Ramone, Joey Ramone, Rey	2:28
4.	"Punishment Fits the Crime"	D. Ramone, Richie Stotts	3:05
5.	"All Screwed Up"	Joey Ramone, Andy Shernoff, Marky Ramone, Rey	3:59
6.	"Palisades Park" (Freddy Cannon cover)	Chuck Barris	2:22

Side two
No.	Title	Writer(s)	Length
7.	"Pet Sematary"	D. Ramone, Rey	3:30
8.	"Learn to Listen"	D. Ramone, Johnny Ramone, M. Ramone, Rey	1:50
9.	"Can't Get You Outta My Mind"	Joey Ramone	3:21
10.	"Ignorance Is Bliss"	Joey Ramone, Shernoff	2:38
11.	"Come Back, Baby"	Joey Ramone	4:01
12.	"Merry Christmas (I Don't Want to Fight Tonight)"	Joey Ramone	2:04

Captain Oi! reissue CD bonus track
No.	Title	Writer(s)	Length
13.	"Pet Sematary" (Bill Laswell version)	D. Ramone, Rey	3:35

== Personnel ==
Adapted from the album liner notes, except where noted.

Ramones

- Joey Ramone – lead vocals (except track 4)
- Johnny Ramone – guitar
- Dee Dee Ramone – bass, backing vocals, (Note: Daniel Rey has stated that "Dee Dee was kinda zonked during the record because I think it took a lot out of him to write it and do the rehearsals. Maybe he played on one or two (songs).") lead vocals (track 4)
- Marky Ramone – drums

Additional musicians

- Daniel Rey – guitar, bass, backing vocals (Note: Performed backing vocals on at least "Pet Sematary")
- Andy Shernoff – bass (Note: Andy Shernoff and Daniel Rey played the majority of the bass on the album. Shernoff confirmed he performed on at least "All Screwed Up" and "Ignorance Is Bliss". In Monte Melnick's book On the Road with the Ramones, Shernoff was quoted saying, "I played bass on the songs I wrote with Joey.")
- Jean Beauvoir – additional guitar, (Note: Jean Beauvoir performed additional guitar on at least "Merry Christmas (I Don't Want to Fight Tonight)".) bass, (Note: Jean Beauvoir performed bass on at least "Pet Sematary".) keyboards, (Note: Jean Beauvoir performed keyboards on at least "Pet Sematary".) backing vocals
- Artie Smith – additional guitar
- Robert Musso – additional guitar

Technical

- Bill Laswell – producer (except tracks 7, 12)
- Jean Beauvoir – producer (tracks 7, 12)
- Daniel Rey – producer (tracks 7, 12), musical coordinator
- Jason Corsaro – mixing
- Robert Musso – mixing, engineer (at Sorcerer Sound and Quad Recording)
- Oz Fritz – assistant mixing engineer
- Martin Bisi – additional engineer (at B.C. Studio)
- Fernando Kral – engineer (track 7)
- Don Peterkofsky – engineer (track 12)
- Judy Kirschner – assistant engineer (at Sorcerer Sound)
- Robbie Norris – assistant engineer (at Quad Recording)
- Tony Maserati – assistant engineer (track 12)
- Howie Weinberg – mastering
- Gary "Mudbone" Cooper – production assistant
- Nicky Skopelitis – production assistant
- Rachel McBeth – production assistant
- Kim White – production assistant
- Mark Sidgwick – production assistant
- Matt Mahurin – front cover painting
- Bill Fishman – inside photography
- Rick Springer – Brain Drain logo
- George DuBose – cover design and coordination

== Charts ==
Audio

Chart (1989)	Peak position
Finnish Albums (The Official Finnish Charts)	23
German Albums (Offizielle Top 100)	40
Swedish Albums (Sverigetopplistan)	41
UK Albums (Official Charts)	75
US Billboard 200	122

Singles

Pet Sematary

Chart (1989)	Peak position
US Alternative Songs (Billboard)	4
