= Poison Heart =

- 1992 UK CD single cover

Single by Ramones

from the album Mondo Bizarro
- B-side: "Censorshit"
- Released: 1992
- Genre: Punk rock, alternative rock
- Length: 4:04
- Label: Radioactive Records
- Songwriters: Dee Dee Ramone, Daniel Rey
- Producer: Ed Stasium

Ramones singles chronology
"Pet Sematary" (1989)	"Poison Heart" (1992)

"Poison Heart" is a song by the punk rock band Ramones. Written by their former bassist Dee Dee Ramone and given in exchange for bail money, it was included on the 1992 album Mondo Bizarro and also released as a single. It has a slower tempo than most Ramones songs.

A music video was directed by Samuel Bayer and later released in the 2005 compilation box set Weird Tales of the Ramones as bonus content on the documentary DVD Lifestyles of the Ramones. It plays over the end credits of the 1992 American horror film Pet Sematary Two.

== Covers ==
Stiv Bators, former vocalist for the Dead Boys and Dee Dee Ramone's friend, recorded a version of the song which was released posthumously on the 1996 album Last Race.

Finnish rock band the 4 Faces recorded a cover of the song as a B-side to their single ”Best Of Both Worlds” in 2002. The single features Hanoi Rocks members Andy McCoy (on guitar) and Michael Monroe (on backing vocals and as co-producer).

Finnish rock band HIM recorded and released a cover of the song as a B-side to their hit single "Wings of a Butterfly" in 2005.

P. Paul Fenech, lead singer of the psychobilly band the Meteors, covered the song on his solo album The "F" Word in 2006.

Blondie performed acoustic versions of "Poison Heart" and "I Wanna Be Your Boyfriend" at their October 14, 2006, show at CBGB's. It was the penultimate show at the club before its closing. The last show was performed the next day by Patti Smith.

== Track listing ==
UK CHS 3917 - 7"

1. "Poison Heart"
2. "Censorshit"

UK 12CHSS 3917 - 12"

1. "Poison Heart"
2. "Chinese Rocks (Live)"
3. "Sheena Is a Punk Rocker (Live)"
4. "Rockaway Beach (Live)"

UK CDCHSS3917 - CD Part 1

1. "Poison Heart"
2. "Sheena Is a Punk Rocker (Live)"
3. "Rockaway Beach (Live)"

UK CDCHS3917 - CD Part 2

1. "Poison Heart"
2. "Do You Remember Rock & Roll Radio (Live)"
3. "Chinese Rocks (Live)"

== Personnel ==
Ramones

- Joey Ramone – lead vocals
- Johnny Ramone – guitar
- C. J. Ramone – bass
- Marky Ramone – drums

Additional personnel

- Flo & Eddie – backing vocals

== Chart positions ==
Chart (1992)	Peak Position
Australia (ARIA)	143
UK Singles Chart	69
US Billboard Hot 100	98
US Billboard Modern Rock Tracks	2
US Post Modern (Hits)	10
