= Ramones =

American punk rock band (1974–1996)

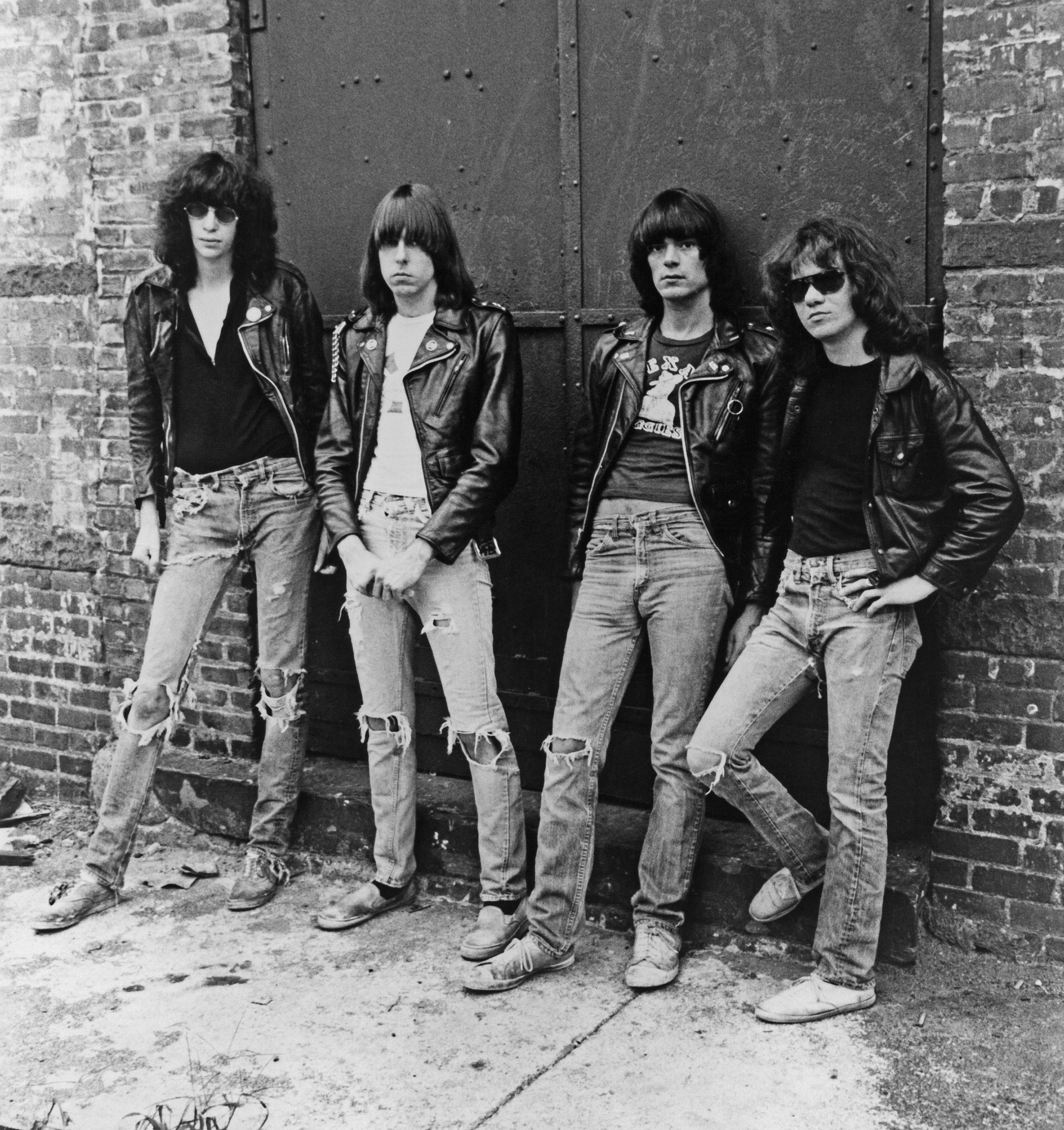
- The Ramones in 1977; From left to right: Joey Ramone, Johnny Ramone, Dee Dee Ramone, and Tommy Ramone

Background information
- Origin: Forest Hills, Queens, New York City, U.S.
- Genres: Punk rock; pop-punk
- Works: Discography; concerts
- Years active: 1974–1996
- Labels: Sire; Warner Bros.; Philips; Beggars Banquet; Radioactive/MCA; Chrysalis; Ariola; RCA; Barclay
- Past members: Joey Ramone; Johnny Ramone; Dee Dee Ramone; Tommy Ramone; Marky Ramone; Richie Ramone; Elvis Ramone; C. J. Ramone
- Website: ramones.com
- Logo
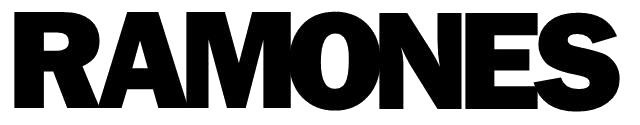

The Ramones (Note: The band is often referred to as the Ramones, though most of the band's releases refer to them as simply "Ramones". Some compilation albums use "The Ramones".) were an American punk rock band formed in the New York City neighborhood Forest Hills, Queens, in 1974. Known for helping establish the punk movement in the United States and elsewhere, the Ramones are often recognized as one of the first bands of the genre. Although they never achieved significant commercial success during their existence, the band is highly influential in punk culture.

All members adopted pseudonyms ending with the surname Ramone, although none were biologically related; they were inspired by Paul McCartney, who used the stage name Paul Ramon when the Beatles were still calling themselves The Silver Beetles. The Ramones performed 2,263 concerts, touring virtually nonstop for 22 years, and released fourteen studio albums. In 1996, after a tour as part of the Lollapalooza music festival, they played a farewell concert in Los Angeles and disbanded.

By 2014, all four original members had died: lead singer Joey Ramone (1951–2001), bassist Dee Dee Ramone (1951–2002), guitarist Johnny Ramone (1948–2004) and drummer Tommy Ramone (1949–2014). The Ramones had experienced a few lineup changes, with Joey and Johnny as the only constant members. Tommy left the band in 1978 to pursue a career in record production, and was replaced by Marky Ramone, who himself was replaced by Richie Ramone in 1983. Following Richie's departure in 1987, and a brief stint with Elvis Ramone, Marky rejoined the band and Dee Dee left two years later, being replaced by C. J. Ramone. From 1989 to their breakup in 1996, the Ramones consisted of Joey, Johnny, Marky and C. J. Ramone.

Recognition of the band's importance has built over the years. The Ramones were ranked number 26 in Rolling Stone magazine's 2004 list of the "100 Greatest Artists of All Time" and number 17 in VH1's 2012 television series 100 Greatest Artists of Hard Rock. In 2002, the Ramones were ranked the second-greatest band of all time by Spin, trailing only the Beatles. On March 18, 2002, the original four members and Tommy's replacement on drums, Marky Ramone, were all inducted into the Rock and Roll Hall of Fame in their first year of eligibility. In 2011, the band was awarded a Grammy Lifetime Achievement Award.

== History ==
=== Formation (1974–1975) ===
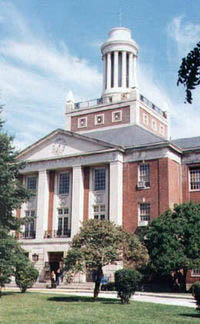
Forest Hills High School, attended by the four original members of the Ramones

The original members of the band met in and around the middle-class neighborhood of Forest Hills in the New York City borough of Queens. John Cummings and Thomas Erdelyi had both been in a high-school garage band from 1965 to 1967 known as the Tangerine Puppets. They became friends with Douglas Colvin, who had recently moved to the area from Germany, and Jeff Hyman, who was the singer for the glam rock band Sniper, founded in 1972.

The Ramones began taking shape in early 1974 when Cummings and Colvin invited Hyman to join them in a band. Colvin wanted to play guitar and sing, Cummings would also play guitar and Hyman would play drums. The lineup was to be completed with their friend Richie Stern on bass. However, after only a few rehearsals it became clear that Stern could not play bass, so the group parted ways with him and became a trio, with Colvin switching from guitar to bass in addition to singing while Cummings became the only guitarist. Colvin was the first to adopt the name "Ramone", calling himself Dee Dee Ramone. He was inspired by Paul McCartney's use of the pseudonym Paul Ramon during his Silver Beetles days. Dee Dee convinced the other members to take on the name and came up with the idea of calling the band the Ramones. Hyman and Cummings became Joey and Johnny Ramone, respectively.

A friend of the band, Monte A. Melnick (later their tour manager), helped to arrange rehearsal time for them at Manhattan's Performance Studios, where he worked. Johnny's former bandmate Erdelyi was set to become their manager. Soon after the band was formed, Dee Dee realized that he could not sing and play his bass guitar simultaneously; with Erdelyi's encouragement, Joey became the band's new lead singer. Dee Dee would continue, however, to count off each song's tempo with his signature rapid-fire shout of "1-2-3-4!" Joey soon similarly realized that he could not sing and play drums simultaneously and left the position of drummer. While auditioning prospective replacements, Erdelyi would often take to the drums and demonstrate how to play the songs. It became apparent that he was able to perform the group's music better than anyone else, and he joined the band as Tommy Ramone.

The Ramones played before an audience for the first time on March 30, 1974, at Performance Studios. The songs they played were very fast and very short; most clocked in at under two minutes. Around this time, a new music scene was emerging in New York centered on two clubs in downtown Manhattan—Max's Kansas City and, more famously, CBGB (usually referred to as CBGB's). The Ramones made their CBGB debut on August 16, 1974. Legs McNeil, who cofounded Punk magazine the following year, later described the impact of that performance: "They were all wearing these black leather jackets. And they counted off this song ... and it was just this wall of noise ... They looked so striking. These guys were not hippies. This was something completely new."

The band swiftly became regulars at the club, playing there seventy-four times by the end of the year. After garnering considerable attention for their performances—which averaged about seventeen minutes from beginning to end—the group was signed to a recording contract in late 1975 by Seymour Stein of Sire Records. Sire A&R man Craig Leon saw the band and brought them to the attention of the label. Stein's wife, Linda Stein, saw the band play at Mothers; she would later co-manage them along with Danny Fields. By this time, the Ramones were recognized as leaders of the new scene that was increasingly being referred to as "punk". The group's unusual frontman had a lot to do with their impact. As Dee Dee explained, "All the other singers [in New York] were copying David Johansen [of the New York Dolls], who was copying Mick Jagger ... But Joey was unique, totally unique."

=== Spearheading punk (1976–1977) ===
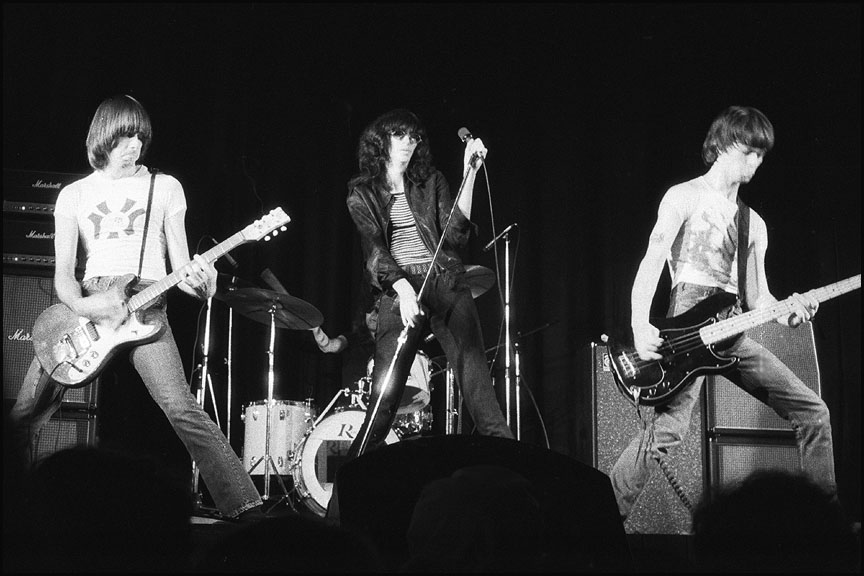
Ramones performing in Toronto in 1976

April 1976 issue of Punk. The cover image of Joey, by Punk cofounder John Holmstrom, was inspired by the work of comic artist Will Eisner. Holmstrom would go on to do album art for Rocket to Russia and Road to Ruin.

The Ramones recorded their debut album, Ramones, in February 1976. Of the fourteen songs on the album, the longest, "I Don't Wanna Go Down to the Basement", barely surpassed two and a half minutes. While the songwriting credits were shared by the entire band, and each member did contribute some writing, much of the writing was done by Dee Dee. The Ramones album was produced by Sire's Craig Leon, with Tommy as associate producer, on an extremely low budget of about $6,400 and released on April 23. The now-iconic front cover photograph of the band was taken by Roberta Bayley, a photographer for Punk magazine. Punk, which was largely responsible for codifying the term for the scene emerging around CBGB, ran a cover story on the Ramones in its third issue, the same month as the album's release.

The Ramones' debut album was greeted by rock critics with glowing reviews. The Village Voice's Robert Christgau wrote, "I love this record—love it—even though I know these boys flirt with images of brutality (Nazi especially) ... For me, it blows everything else off the radio." In Rolling Stone, Paul Nelson described it as "constructed almost entirely of rhythm tracks of an exhilarating intensity rock & roll has not experienced since its earliest days." Characterizing the band as "authentic American primitives whose work has to be heard to be understood", he declared, "It is time popular music followed the other arts in honoring its primitives." Newsday's Wayne Robbins simply anointed the Ramones as "the best young rock 'n' roll band in the known universe."

Despite Sire's high hopes for it, Ramones was not a commercial success, reaching only number 111 on the Billboard album chart. The two singles issued from the album, "Blitzkrieg Bop" and "I Wanna Be Your Boyfriend", failed to chart. At the band's first major performance outside of New York, a June date in Youngstown, Ohio, members of Cleveland punk legends Frankenstein aka the Dead Boys were present and struck up a friendship with the band. It was not until they made a brief tour of England that they began to see the fruits of their labor; a performance at the Roundhouse in London on July 4, 1976, with The Stranglers supporting the Flamin' Groovies, organized by Linda Stein, was a resounding success. T. Rex leader Marc Bolan was in attendance at the Roundhouse show and was invited on stage. Their Roundhouse appearance and a club date the following night—where the band met members of the Sex Pistols and the Clash—helped galvanize the burgeoning UK punk rock scene. The Flamin' Groovies/Ramones double bill was successfully reprised at the Roxy Theatre in Los Angeles the following month, fueling the punk scene there as well. The Ramones were becoming an increasingly popular live act—a Toronto performance in September energized yet another growing punk scene.

Their next two albums, Leave Home and Rocket to Russia, were both released in 1977, and produced by Tommy and Tony Bongiovi, the second cousin of Jon Bon Jovi. Leave Home met with even less chart success than Ramones, though it did include "Pinhead", which became one of the band's signature songs with its chanted refrain of "Gabba gabba hey!" Leave Home also included a fast-paced cover of the oldie "California Sun", written by Henry Glover and Morris Levy, and originally recorded by Joe Jones, though the Ramones based their version on the remake by the Rivieras. Rocket to Russia was the band's highest-charting album to date, reaching number 49 on the Billboard 200. In Rolling Stone, critic Dave Marsh called it "the best American rock & roll of the year". The album also featured the first Ramones single to enter the Billboard charts (albeit only as high as number 81): "Sheena Is a Punk Rocker". The follow-up single, "Rockaway Beach", reached number 66—the highest any Ramones single would ever reach in America. On December 31, 1977, the Ramones recorded It's Alive, a live concert double album, at the Rainbow Theatre in London, which was released in April 1979 (the title is a reference to the 1974 horror film of the same name).

=== Transitional period (1978–1983) ===
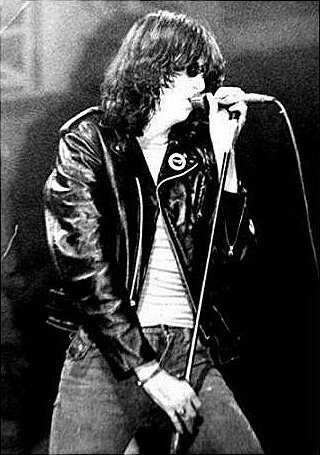
Joey Ramone, c. 1980

Tommy, tired of touring, left the band in early 1978. He continued as the Ramones' record producer under his birth name of Erdelyi. His position as drummer was filled by Marc Bell, who had been a member of the early 1970s hard rock band Dust, Wayne County, and the pioneering punk group Richard Hell and the Voidoids. Bell adopted the name Marky Ramone. Later that year, the band released their fourth studio album, and first with Marky, Road to Ruin. The album, co-produced by Tommy with Ed Stasium, included some new sounds such as acoustic guitar, several ballads, and the band's first two recorded songs longer than three minutes. It failed to reach the Billboard Top 100. However, "I Wanna Be Sedated", which appeared both on the album and as a single, would become one of the band's best-known songs. The artwork on the album's cover was done by Punk magazine cofounder John Holmstrom.

After the band's movie debut in Roger Corman's Rock 'n' Roll High School (1979), producer Phil Spector became interested in the Ramones and produced their fifth album End of the Century (1980). There is a long-disputed rumor that during the recording sessions in Los Angeles, Spector held Dee Dee at gunpoint, forcing him to repeatedly play a riff. Although it was to be the highest-charting album in the band's history—reaching number 44 in the United States and number 14 in Great Britain—Johnny made clear that he favored the band's more aggressive punk material: "End of the Century was just watered-down Ramones. It's not the real Ramones." This stance was also conveyed by the title and track selection of the compilation album Johnny later oversaw, Loud, Fast Ramones: Their Toughest Hits. Despite these reservations, Johnny did concede that some of Spector's work with the band had merit, saying "It really worked when he got to a slower song like 'Danny Says'—the production really worked tremendously. 'Rock 'N' Roll Radio' is really good. For the harder stuff, it didn't work as well." The string-laden Ronettes cover "Baby, I Love You" released as a single, became the band's biggest hit in Great Britain, reaching number 8 on the charts.

Pleasant Dreams, the band's sixth album, was released in 1981. It continued the trend established by End of the Century, taking the band further from the raw punk sound of its early records. As described by Trouser Press, the album, produced by Graham Gouldman of UK pop act 10cc, moved the Ramones "away from their pioneering minimalism into heavy metal territory." Johnny would contend in retrospect that this direction was a record company decision, a continued futile attempt to get airplay on American radio. While Pleasant Dreams reached number 58 on the U.S. chart, its two singles failed to register at all.

Subterranean Jungle, produced by Ritchie Cordell and Glen Kolotkin, was released in 1983. According to Trouser Press, it brought the band "back to where they once belonged: junky '60s pop adjusted for current tastes", which among other things meant "easing off the breakneck rhythm that was once Ramones dogma." Billy Rogers, who had performed with Johnny Thunders and the Heartbreakers, played drums on the album's second single, a cover of the Chambers Brothers' "Time Has Come Today", becoming the only song showing three different drummers: Rogers on recording, Marky on album credits and Richie on video clip. Johnny stated that he was "kinda disappointed" with Subterranean Jungle because he felt it was "too melodic, too 'pop', and too commercial" like End of the Century and Pleasant Dreams. Subterranean Jungle peaked at number 83 in the United States—it would be the last album by the band to crack the Billboard Top 100. In 2002, Rhino Records released a new version of it with seven bonus tracks.

=== Shuffling members (1983–1989) ===
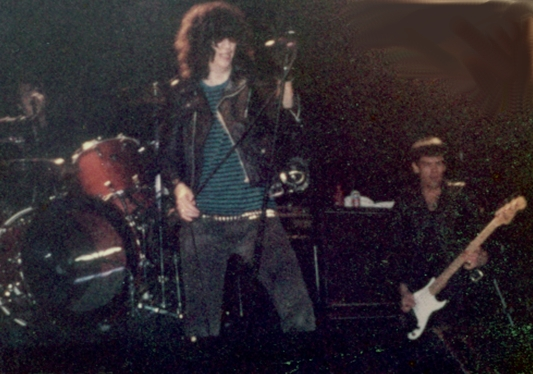
Joey and Dee Dee Ramone performing in Seattle in 1983

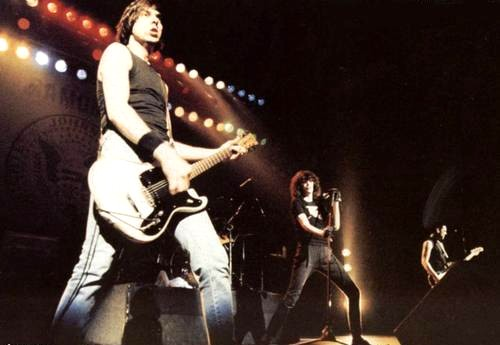
Ramones performing in São Paulo in 1987

After the release of Subterranean Jungle, Marky was fired from the band due to his alcoholism. He was replaced by Richard Reinhardt, who adopted the name Richie Ramone. Joey Ramone remarked that "[Richie] saved the band as far as I'm concerned. He's the greatest thing to happen to the Ramones. He put the spirit back in the band." Richie is the only Ramones drummer to sing lead vocals on Ramones songs, including "(You) Can't Say Anything Nice" as well as the unreleased "Elevator Operator". Joey Ramone commented, "Richie's very talented and he's very diverse ... He really strengthened the band a hundred percent because he sings backing tracks, he sings lead, and he sings with Dee Dee's stuff. In the past, it was always just me singing for the most part." Richie was also the only drummer to be the sole composer of Ramones songs including their hit "Somebody Put Something in My Drink" as well as "Smash You", "Humankind", "I'm Not Jesus", "I Know Better Now" and "(You) Can't Say Anything Nice". Joey Ramone supported Richie's songwriting contributions: "I encouraged Richie to write songs. I figured it would make him feel more a part of the group, because we never let anybody else write our songs." Richie's composition, "Somebody Put Something in My Drink", remained a staple in the Ramones set list until their last show in 1996 and was included in the album Loud, Fast Ramones: Their Toughest Hits. The eight-song bonus disc, The Ramones Smash You: Live '85, is also named after Richie's composition "Smash You".

The first album the Ramones recorded with Richie was Too Tough to Die in 1984, with Tommy Erdelyi and Ed Stasium returning as producers. The album marked a shift to something like the band's original sound. In the description of Allmusic's Stephen Thomas Erlewine, the "rhythms are back up to jackhammer speed and the songs are down to short, terse statements."

The band's only release of 1985 was the British single "Bonzo Goes to Bitburg"; though it was available in the United States only as an import, it was played widely on American college radio. The song was written, primarily by Joey, in protest of Ronald Reagan's visit to a German military cemetery, which included graves of Waffen-SS soldiers. Retitled "My Brain Is Hanging Upside Down (Bonzo Goes to Bitburg)", the song appeared on the band's ninth studio album, Animal Boy (1986). Produced by Jean Beauvoir, formerly a member of the Plasmatics, the album was characterized by a Rolling Stone reviewer as "nonstop primal fuzz pop". Making it his pick for "album of the week", New York Times critic Jon Pareles wrote that the Ramones "speak up for outcasts and disturbed individuals".

The following year the band recorded their last album with Richie, Halfway to Sanity. Richie left in August 1987 after financial conflicts with Johnny that centered around him being refused a small percentage of the merchandising money, which he had requested based on his tenure with the band and their use of his name and image. Richie was replaced by Clem Burke from Blondie, which was disbanded at the time. According to Johnny, the performances with Burke—who adopted the name Elvis Ramone—were a disaster. He was fired after two performances (August 28 and 29, 1987) because his drumming could not keep up with the rest of the band. In September, Marky, now clean and sober, returned to the band.

In December 1988, the Ramones recorded material for their eleventh studio album, and what was originally intended to be a "comeback" for the band, Brain Drain was co-produced by Beauvoir, Rey, and Bill Laswell. However, the bass parts were done by Daniel Rey and the Dictators' Andy Shernoff. Dee Dee Ramone recorded only the additional vocals on the album citing that members of the band (including himself) were going through personal troubles and changes to the point where he did not want to be in the band anymore. Although it received mixed reviews upon its release in May 1989, the album included the band's highest-charting hit in the US, "Pet Sematary".

Despite wanting to leave the band, Dee Dee (who was sober by this point) was present for the world tour for Brain Drain and played his last show with the Ramones on July 5, 1989, at One Step Beyond in Santa Clara. He was replaced by Christopher Joseph Ward (C. J. Ramone), who performed with the band until it disbanded. Dee Dee initially pursued a brief career as a rapper under the name Dee Dee King. He quickly returned to punk rock and formed several bands, in much the same vein as the Ramones. He also continued to write songs for the Ramones, but never rejoined the band.

=== Final years (1990–1996) ===
The band fulfilled their contract with Sire Records in 1991 after being on the label for over a decade and a half, ending with the release of Loco Live. After leaving Sire Records, Brett Gurewitz of Bad Religion offered to sign the band to his label Epitaph Records, even traveling to a concert in Amsterdam and begging Joey and Johnny. Meanwhile, Stormy Shepard from Leave Home Bookings (who was booking then-up-and-coming bands on Epitaph like the Offspring and NOFX) negotiated with the Ramones: "I'll put you on tour with these bands that are huge now. They're your fans; you can do whatever you want. You'll be playing in front of kids who like this style of music." At the same time, the band's manager, Gary Kurfurst had just worked out a deal where he was going to get his own record label, Radioactive Records. When C. J. Ramone heard Johnny talking about signing to Kurfirst's label, he questioned: "Johnny, you've run this band for years. You carried it all yourself. I don't understand how you don't see the conflict of interest in signing to your manager's label. Just in terms of business, I don't understand how you don't see that. You're really throwing away the last few years of your career. Those Epitaph guys grew up listening to you. They will do anything to give you the business success you never had. Your manager will do the same thing he always has. He's going to throw his stuff out there. You're going to break through without anyone's support and you're going to face the rest of your career the way it's been up until now." Johnny replied: "When you have as many years in the business as I do, then you can make the decisions."

By Johnny's decision, the group ended up signing a new contract with Radioactive Records at the end of that year, the Ramones were soon able to start on sessions for what would become Mondo Bizarro (1992), which saw them reunited with producer Ed Stasium. Anticipated as a "comeback" for the band after years of decline in popularity, the album was certified Gold in Brazil after selling 100,000 copies, being the first Gold certification the Ramones were ever awarded, while its lead single "Poison Heart" was an Alternative Airplay top ten hit in the US for the band. Acid Eaters, consisting entirely of cover songs, came out in 1993. That same year, the Ramones were featured in the animated television series The Simpsons, providing music and voices for animated versions of themselves in the episode "Rosebud", marking the series' first guest appearance by a punk band. Executive producer David Mirkin described the Ramones as "gigantic, obsessive Simpsons fans". Marky later called their appearance "a career highlight".

In 1995, the Ramones released their fourteenth and final studio album ¡Adios Amigos! and announced that they would be disbanding the following year. Its sales were unremarkable, garnering it just two weeks on the lower end of the Billboard chart. The band spent late 1995 on what was promoted as a farewell tour, for which a New York City date was recorded for the live album Greatest Hits Live. However, they accepted an offer to appear in the sixth Lollapalooza festival, which toured around the United States during the following summer. After the Lollapalooza tour's conclusion, the Ramones played their final show on August 6, 1996, at the Palace in Hollywood. A recording of the concert was later released on video and CD as We're Outta Here!. In addition to a reappearance by Dee Dee, the show featured several guests including Motörhead's Lemmy, Pearl Jam's Eddie Vedder, Soundgarden's Chris Cornell and Ben Shepherd, and Rancid's Tim Armstrong and Lars Frederiksen.

According to Frederiksen, an unannounced final leg of the farewell tour was being planned for South America, with Rancid as the opener. Joey's brother, Mickey Leigh, elaborated on this, saying that Johnny, Marky, and C.J., all agreed to it, but Joey turned it down due to declining health.

=== Aftermath and deaths of members ===
On July 20, 1999, Dee Dee, Johnny, Joey, Tommy, Marky, and C. J. appeared together at the Virgin Megastore in New York City for an autograph signing. This was the last occasion on which the original four members of the group appeared together. Joey and Marky, who had been involved in a feud, buried the hatchet and made up on live radio on The Howard Stern Show that same year. Joey, who had been diagnosed with lymphoma in 1995, died of the illness in New York on April 15, 2001. Tommy, Richie and C. J. were the only former bandmates to attend his funeral. Joey and Richie had a close friendship during their time together in the band and the latter expressed sadness over not being able to reconnect with Joey before his death.

On March 18, 2002, the Ramones were inducted into the Rock and Roll Hall of Fame, which specifically named Dee Dee, Johnny, Joey, Tommy, and Marky. At the ceremony, the surviving inductees spoke on behalf of the band. Johnny spoke first, thanking the band's fans and blessing George W. Bush and his presidency, and America. Tommy spoke next, saying how honored the band felt, but how much it would have meant for Joey. Dee Dee humorously congratulated and thanked himself, while Marky thanked Tommy for influencing his drum style. Green Day played "Teenage Lobotomy", "Rockaway Beach", and "Blitzkrieg Bop" as a tribute, demonstrating the Ramones' continuing influence on later rock musicians. The ceremony was one of Dee Dee's last public appearances, as he was found dead on June 5, 2002, from a heroin overdose.

The documentary film End of the Century: The Story of the Ramones came out in 2004. Johnny, who had been diagnosed with prostate cancer in 1999, died on September 15, 2004, in Los Angeles, shortly after the film's release. On the same day as Johnny's death, the world's first Ramones Museum opened its doors to the public. Located in Berlin, Germany, the museum features more than 300 items of memorabilia, including a pair of stage-worn jeans from Johnny, a stage-worn glove from Joey, Marky's sneakers, and C. J.'s stage-worn bass strap. Clem Burke, who briefly replaced Richie in the Ramones in 1987, died on April 6, 2025, after a battle with cancer, making him the first non-original member of the band to die.

== Conflicts between members ==
Tension between Joey and Johnny colored much of the Ramones' career. The pair were politically antagonistic, with Joey being a liberal and Johnny a conservative. Their personalities also clashed: Johnny spent two years in military school and lived by a strict code of self-discipline, while Joey struggled with obsessive–compulsive disorder and alcoholism. In the early 1980s, Linda Danielle began a relationship with Johnny after having already been romantically involved with Joey, who had reportedly accused Johnny of "stealing" his girlfriend. This incident is believed to have been the inspiration behind "The KKK Took My Baby Away". Consequently, despite their continued professional relationship, Joey and Johnny had become aloof from each other. Johnny did not contact Joey before his death, although he said that he was depressed for "the whole week" after his death.

Dee Dee's bipolar disorder and repeated relapses into drug addiction also caused significant strains. Tommy would also leave the band after being "physically threatened by Johnny, treated with contempt by Dee Dee, and all but ignored by Joey." As new members joined over the years, disbursement and the band's image frequently became matters of serious dispute. The tensions among the group members were not kept secret from the public as was heard on The Howard Stern Show in 1997, where during the interview Marky and Joey got into a fight about their respective drinking habits.

Political conflicts also existed between Marky and C. J., the latter of whom described it as, "[Marky] made fun of everything conservative and traditional, and I made fun of everything political, both conservative and liberal." A year after the Ramones' breakup, Marky Ramone made disparaging remarks against C. J. in the press, saying he couldn't stand touring with him, and calling him a "bigot", a statement he would reiterate a decade later. C. J. would later respond that he was unsure as to why Marky would make negative comments against him in the press, though he denied that it had anything to do with him marrying Marky's niece. He also denied being a bigot. Many years later, C. J. lamented that despite being the two surviving members of arguably the Ramones' most commercially successful era, and despite reaching out a few times to join him on stage, he and Marky were no longer in contact.

== Artistry ==
=== Musical style ===
The Ramones were described as "rock's premiere punk band". Their loud, fast, straightforward musical style was influenced by pop music that the band members grew up listening to in the 1950s and 1960s, including classic rock groups such as Buddy Holly and the Crickets, the Beach Boys, the Who, the Beatles, the Kinks, Led Zeppelin, the Rolling Stones, the Doors and Creedence Clearwater Revival; bubblegum acts like the 1910 Fruitgum Company and Ohio Express; and girl groups such as the Ronettes and the Shangri-Las. They also drew on the harder rock sound of the MC5, Black Sabbath, the Stooges and the New York Dolls, now known as seminal proto-punk bands. The Ramones' style was in part a reaction against the heavily produced, often bombastic music that dominated the pop charts in the 1970s. "We decided to start our own group because we were bored with everything we heard," Joey once explained. "In 1974 everything was tenth-generation Elton John, or overproduced, or just junk. Everything was long jams, long guitar solos ... . We missed music like it used to be." Ira Robbins and Scott Isler of Trouser Press describe the result:

With just four chords and one manic tempo, New York's Ramones blasted open the clogged arteries of mid-'70s rock, reanimating the music. Their genius was to recapture the short/simple aesthetic from which pop had strayed, adding a caustic sense of trash-culture humor and minimalist rhythm guitar sound.

As leaders in the punk rock scene, the Ramones' music is strongly identified with that label. It has been noted that their recordings also helped the subgenre pop-punk to develop. Some have described certain Ramones songs as power pop. Starting in the 1980s, the band sometimes veered into hardcore punk territory, as can be heard on albums such as Too Tough to Die.

On stage, the band adopted a focused approach directly intended to increase the audience's concert experience. Johnny's instructions to C. J. when preparing for his first live performances with the group were to play facing the audience, to stand with the bass slung low between spread legs, and to walk forward to the front of stage at the same time as he did. Johnny was not a fan of guitarists who performed facing their drummer, amplifier, or other band members.

=== Visual imagery ===
The Ramones' art and visual imagery complemented the themes of their music and performance. The members adopted a uniform look of long hair, leather jackets, T-shirts, torn jeans, and sneakers. This fashion emphasized minimalism—a powerful influence on the New York punk scene of the 1970s—and reflected the band's short, simple songs. Tommy Ramone recalled that, musically and visually, "We were influenced by comic books, movies, the Andy Warhol scene, and avant-garde films. I was a big Mad magazine fan myself."

The band's logo, based on the seal of the president of the United States

The band's logo was created by New York City artist Arturo Vega, with guidance from the Ramones. Vega, a longtime friend, had allowed Joey and Dee Dee to move into his loft. He produced the band's T-shirts—their main source of income—basing most of the images on a black-and-white self-portrait photograph he had taken of his American bald eagle belt buckle, which appeared on the back sleeve of the Ramones' first album. He was inspired to create the band's logo after a trip to Washington, D.C.:

I saw them as the ultimate all-American band. To me, they reflected the American character in general—an almost childish innocent aggression .... I thought, "The Great Seal of the President of the United States" would be perfect for the Ramones, with the eagle holding arrows—to symbolize strength and the aggression that would be used against whomever dares to attack us—and an olive branch, offered to those who want to be friendly. But we decided to change it a little bit. Instead of the olive branch, we had an apple tree branch, since the Ramones were American as apple pie. And since Johnny was such a baseball fanatic, we had the eagle hold a baseball bat instead of the Great Seal's arrows.

The scroll in the eagle's beak originally read "Look out below", but this was soon changed to "Hey ho let's go" after the opening lyrics of the band's first single, "Blitzkrieg Bop". The arrowheads on the shield came from a design on a polyester shirt Vega had bought. "Ramones" was spelled out in block capitals above the logo using plastic stick-on letters. Where the presidential emblem read "Seal of the President of the United States" clockwise in the border around the eagle, Vega placed the pseudonyms of the band members: Johnny, Joey, Dee Dee, and Tommy. Over the years the names in the border would change as the band's line-up fluctuated.

"It's the American presidential seal—anyone can use it," said Marky Ramone of the logo's ubiquity. "We share the royalties on the t-shirt and on the merchandise. A lot of the kids wearing that shirt might not even have heard of the Ramones' music. I guess if you have the shirt, your curiosity might bring you to buy the music. Whatever, it is a strange phenomenon."

== Legacy and influence ==
Never a widely popular band in the United States while active, Gene Simmons of Kiss observed of the Ramones' active period, "They have one gold record to their name. They never played arenas; couldn't sell them out... [i]t doesn't mean they weren't great. It means the masses didn't care."

The Ramones would have a broad and lasting influence on the development of popular music. Music historian Jon Savage writes of their debut album that "it remains one of the few records that changed pop forever." As described by AllMusic critic Stephen Thomas Erlewine, "The band's first four albums set the blueprint for punk, especially American punk and hardcore, for the next two decades." Trouser Press's Robbins and Isler similarly wrote that the Ramones "not only spearheaded the original new wave/punk movement, but also drew the blueprint for subsequent hardcore punk bands". Punk journalist Phil Strongman writes, "In purely musical terms, the Ramones, in attempting to re-create the excitement of pre-Dolby rock, were to cast a huge shadow—they had fused a blueprint for much of the indie future." Writing for Slate in 2001, Douglas Wolk described the Ramones as "easily the most influential group of the last 30 years".

=== Punk and hardcore ===
Locally, several musicians who would play in New York hardcore bands cite the Ramones as an influence. These include members of the Beastie Boys, Gorilla Biscuits, Heart Attack, the Misfits, and the Mob. Roger Miret of Agnostic Front has stated that Leave Home was the first album he bought with his own money. They were also influential to early Boston punk and hardcore groups, Mission of Burma drummer Peter Prescott has highlighted the Ramones self-titled debut as their foremost influence, while SSD guitarist Al Barile was inspired to play guitar after hearing Johnny Ramone. In Washington, D.C., seminal D.C. hardcore band Bad Brains took their name from a Ramones song, and Henry Rollins described seeing a Ramones live set, "as full-on a live experience as I have ever had and almost ruined me for going to other shows."

Canada's first major punk scenes in Toronto and in British Columbia's Victoria and Vancouver, such as Teenage Head, Nomeansno, and D.O.A., were also heavily influenced by the Ramones. Ramones concerts and recordings also influenced many musicians central to the development of California punk, including Greg Ginn of Black Flag, Jello Biafra and East Bay Ray of the Dead Kennedys, Mike Ness of Social Distortion, Brett Gurewitz of Bad Religion, Mike Muir of Suicidal Tendencies, Fat Mike of NOFX, and members of the Descendents, the Zeros, and the Dickies.

The Ramones' eponymous debut album had an outsized effect relative to its modest sales, particularly in the UK. According to Generation X bassist Tony James, "Everybody went up three gears the day they got that first Ramones album. Punk rock—that rama-lama super fast stuff—is totally down to the Ramones. Bands were just playing in an MC5 groove until then." His bandmate, Billy Idol, reiterated this saying that except for the Sex Pistols, every London punk band started speeding up their music up after hearing the Ramones. While Sex Pistols drummer Paul Cook denied a musical influence, he credits the release of the first Ramones album as motivating the Pistols.

The Ramones' two July 1976 shows, like their debut album, are seen as having a significant impact on the style of many of the newly formed British punk acts—as one observer put it, "instantly nearly every band speeded up". The Ramones' first British concert, at London's Roundhouse music venue, was held on July 4, 1976, the United States Bicentennial. The Sex Pistols were playing in Sheffield that evening, supported by the Clash, making their public debut. The next night, members of both bands attended the Ramones' gig at the Dingwall's club. Ramones manager Danny Fields recalls a conversation between Johnny Ramone and Clash bassist Paul Simonon (which he mislocates at the Roundhouse): "Johnny asked him, 'What do you do? Are you in a band?' Paul said, 'Well, we just rehearse. We call ourselves the Clash but we're not good enough.' Johnny said, 'Wait till you see us—we stink, we're lousy, we can't play. Just get out there and do it.'" Another band whose members saw the Ramones perform on the 4th, the Damned, played their first show two days later.

Other U.K. punk bands who were influenced during this period include Chelsea, the Lurkers, the Undertones, and The Vibrators. Jimmy Pursey of Sham 69 has said that he considers the Ramones his band's "only blueprint". The central fanzine of the early UK punk scene, Sniffin' Glue, was named after the song "Now I Wanna Sniff Some Glue", which appeared on the Ramones' debut album. According to Chrissie Hynde, after getting recruited into the Sex Pistols, Sid Vicious learned to play by staying up for three nights on speed playing along to the Ramones first album.

The Ramones' pop-influenced style of punk rock has been credited for paving the way for the birth of pop-punk, being cited as an influence by those of Green Day, the Offspring, Blink-182, Fall Out Boy, New Found Glory, the Ataris, and Alkaline Trio. Green Day frontman Billie Joe Armstrong named his son Joey in homage to Joey Ramone, and drummer Tré Cool named his daughter Ramona. The Riverdales, who Armstrong produced, emulated the sound of the Ramones throughout their career.

=== Other genres ===
The Ramones also influenced musicians associated with genres outside of punk, such as heavy metal. Their influence on metal gave birth to the punk-metal "fusion" genre of thrash. Metallica guitarist Kirk Hammett, one of the originators of thrash guitar, has described the importance of Johnny's rapid-fire guitar playing style to his own musical development. Motörhead lead singer Lemmy, a friend of the Ramones since the late 1970s, mixed the band's "Go Home Ann" in 1985. The members of Motörhead later composed the song "R.A.M.O.N.E.S." as a tribute, and Lemmy performed at the final Ramones concert in 1996. Paul Di'Anno, who sang on Iron Maiden's first two albums called the Ramones his "favorite band", and often performed Ramones material in his live shows. In the realm of alternative rock, the song "53rd & 3rd" lent its name to a British indie pop label cofounded by Stephen Pastel of the Scottish band the Pastels, and Morrissey, while initially giving a negative review to the Ramones debut album, later commented, "three days after writing that Ramones piece, I realized that my love for the Ramones would out-live time itself." In 2014, he was invited by the band's management to pick the tracks for a compilation that became Morrissey Curates The Ramones.

Other artists that have cited the Ramones as an influence include Duff McKagan of Guns N' Roses, Evan Dando of the Lemonheads, Dave Grohl of Nirvana and Foo Fighters, Mike Portnoy of Dream Theater, Frank Black of the Pixies, Eddie Vedder of Pearl Jam (who introduced the band members at their Rock and Roll Hall of Fame induction), Rachel Bolan of Skid Row, Marty Friedman of Hawaii, Cacophony and Megadeth, Scott Ian and Charlie Benante of Anthrax, Bobby "Blitz" Ellsworth of Overkill, Sonic Youth, the Strokes, Parquet Courts, the Smithereens, Guadalcanal Diary, and the Primitives.

=== Tributes ===
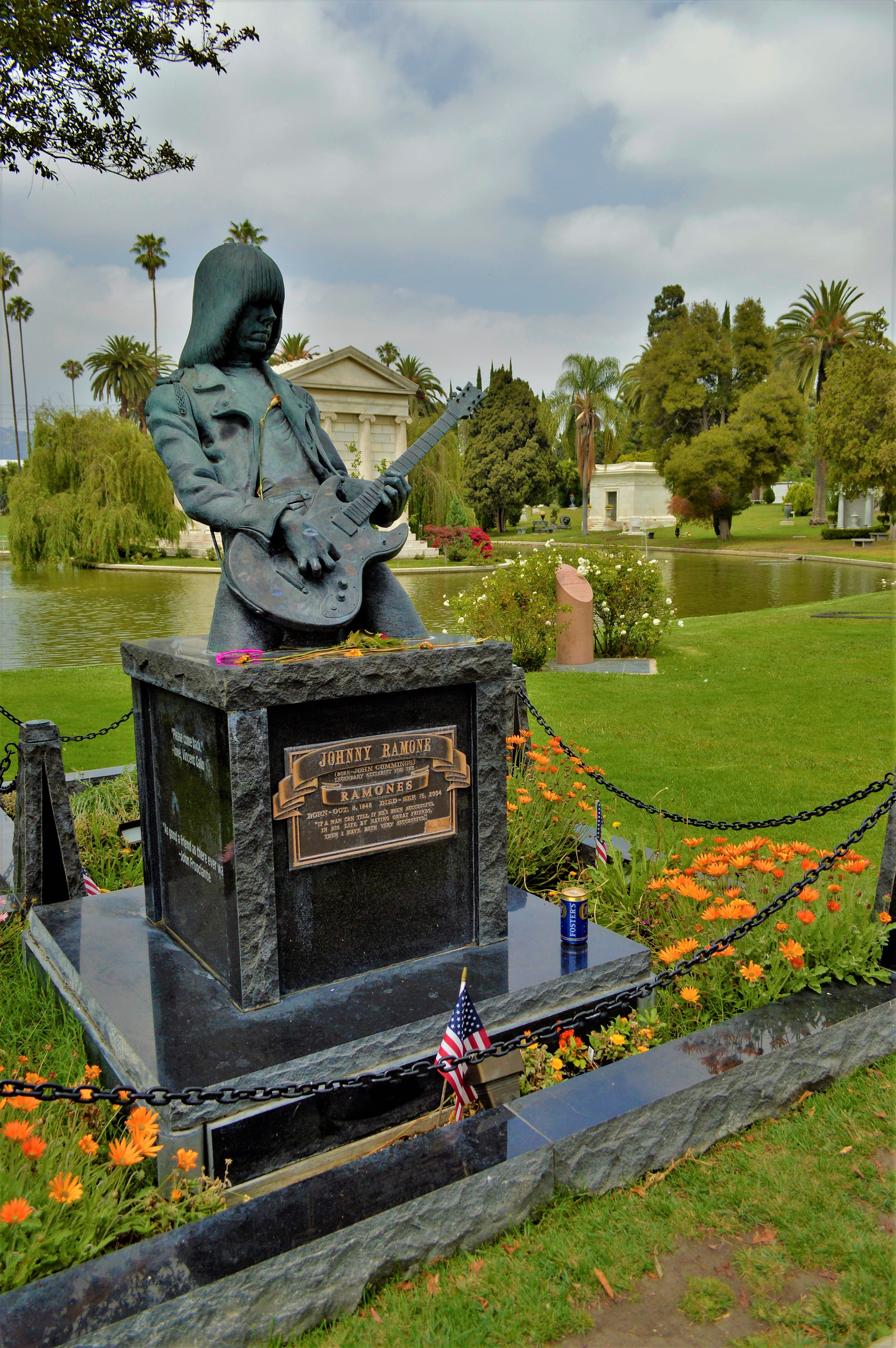
Johnny Ramone's gravestone at Hollywood Forever Cemetery

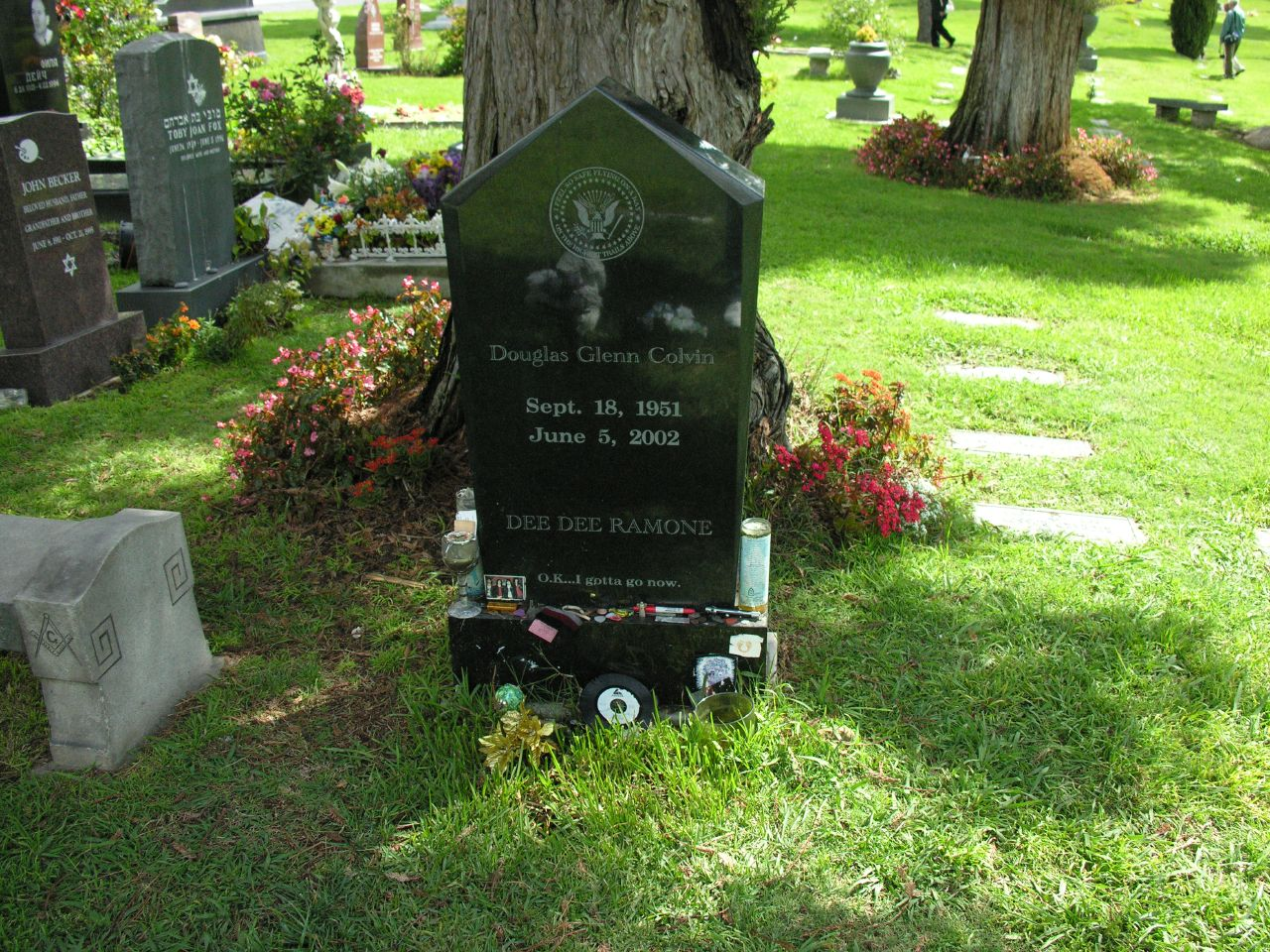
Dee Dee Ramone's gravestone

In April 2009, Spin writer Mark Prindle observed that the Ramones had to date "inspired a jaw-dropping 48 (at least!) full-length tribute records". The first Ramones tribute album featuring multiple performers was released in 1991: Gabba Gabba Hey: A Tribute to the Ramones includes tracks by well-known punk acts like L7 and Bad Religion. In 2001, Dee Dee made a guest appearance on one track of Ramones Maniacs, a multi-artist cover of the entire Ramones Mania compilation album. The Song Ramones the Same, which came out the following year, includes performances by protopunk artists who influenced the Ramones like the Dictators and Wayne Kramer, as well as Ramones-influenced artists like Jesse Malin. We're a Happy Family: A Tribute to Ramones, released in 2003, features several fellow Rock & Roll Hall of Famers such as Green Day, Metallica, Kiss, the Pretenders, the Red Hot Chili Peppers, U2, and Tom Waits.

Punk bands such as Screeching Weasel, the Vindictives, the Queers, Parasites, the Mr. T Experience, Boris the Sprinkler, Beatnik Termites, Tip Toppers, Jon Cougar Concentration Camp, and McRackins have recorded cover versions of entire Ramones albums—Ramones, Leave Home, Rocket to Russia, It's Alive, Road to Ruin, End of the Century, Pleasant Dreams, Subterranean Jungle, two versions of Too Tough to Die, and Halfway to Sanity, respectively. The Huntingtons' File Under Ramones consists of Ramones covers from across the band's history.

Shonen Knife, an all-female trio from Osaka, Japan, was formed in 1981 as a direct result of founder-lead singer-guitarist Naoko Yamano's instant infatuation with the music of the Ramones. In 2012, to observe the band's 30th anniversary, Shonen Knife released Osaka Ramones, which featured thirteen Ramones songs covered by the band. There are also many other tribute albums listed on Jari-Pekka Laitio-Ramone's site.

On September 12, 2004, three days before Johnny's death, a tribute show took place at The Palace, the same venue where the Ramones played their final show. It featured a band made up of C.J., Marky, and Ramones' producer Daniel Rey, performing Ramones songs with Tim Armstrong, Dicky Barrett, Brett Gurewitz, Steve Jones, Henry Rollins, Eddie Vedder, and Pete Yorn. This would later be released as a concert documentary titled Too Tough To Die: A Tribute To Johnny Ramone. Similarly, on October 8 of that same year (which would have been Johnny's 56th birthday), Tommy Ramone, C. J. Ramone, Clem Burke, and Daniel Rey performed together in the "Ramones Beat on Cancer" concert.

After Johnny's death, an annual Johnny Ramone tribute has been held at Hollywood Forever Cemetery, where both Johnny and Dee Dee are buried. It is a benefit for the Johnny Ramone cancer research fund led by Dr. David Agus, and has featured numerous musicians performing Ramones covers including Fred Armisen, Billie Joe Armstrong, Tim Armstrong, Travis Barker, Billy Idol, Steve Jones, The Linda Lindas, Duff McKagan, Morrissey, and C.J. Ramone.

=== Accolades ===
In addition to their 2002 induction into the Rock and Roll Hall of Fame, the Ramones were inducted into the Long Island Music Hall of Fame in 2007. That October saw the release of a DVD set containing concert footage of the band: It's Alive 1974–1996 includes 118 songs from 33 performances over the span of the group's career. In February 2011 the group was honored with a Grammy Lifetime Achievement Award. Drummers Tommy, Marky, and Richie attended the ceremony. Marky declared, "This is amazing. I never expected this. I'm sure Johnny, Joey, and Dee Dee would never have expected this." Richie noted that it was the first time ever that all three drummers were under the same roof, and mused that he couldn't "help thinking that [Joey] is watching us right now with a little smile on his face behind his rose-colored glasses." On April 30, 2014, their debut album, Ramones, became certified Gold by the Recording Industry of America (RIAA) after selling 500,000 copies, 38 years after its release.

The band members were also individually influential. Johnny Ramone was named one of Time's "10 Greatest Electric-Guitar Players" in 2003. That same year, he was number 16 on the "100 Greatest Guitarists of All Time" list in Rolling Stone. On November 30, 2003, New York City unveiled a sign designating East 2nd Street at the corner of Bowery as Joey Ramone Place. The singer lived on East 2nd for a time, and the sign is near the former Bowery site of CBGB.

== Band members ==
- Joey Ramone (Jeffrey Hyman) – lead vocals (1974–1996; died 2001)
- Johnny Ramone (John Cummings) – guitars, (1974–1996; died 2004), backing vocals (1981)
- Dee Dee Ramone (Douglas Colvin) – bass, backing and occasional lead vocals (1974–1989; died 2002)
- Tommy Ramone (Thomas Erdelyi) – drums (1974–1978; died 2014), backing vocals (1976), additional guitar (1976–1978)
- Marky Ramone (Marc Bell) – drums (1978–1983, 1987–1996), backing vocals (1981)
- Richie Ramone (Richard Reinhardt) – drums, backing vocals (1983–1987)
- Elvis Ramone (Clem Burke) – drums (1987; died 2025)
- C. J. Ramone (Christopher Joseph Ward) – bass, backing and occasional lead vocals (1989–1996)

== Discography ==
Studio albums

- Ramones (1976)
- Leave Home (1977)
- Rocket to Russia (1977)
- Road to Ruin (1978)
- End of the Century (1980)
- Pleasant Dreams (1981)
- Subterranean Jungle (1983)
- Too Tough to Die (1984)
- Animal Boy (1986)
- Halfway to Sanity (1987)
- Brain Drain (1989)
- Mondo Bizarro (1992)
- Acid Eaters (1993)
- ¡Adios Amigos! (1995)

== See also ==
- Danny Says (film)
- Gabba Gabba Hey
- List of Ramones concerts
- Ramones Museum

== Sources ==
- Bayles, Martha (1996). Hole in Our Soul: The Loss of Beauty and Meaning in American Popular Music. University of Chicago Press. ISBN 0-226-03959-5.
- Beeber, Steven Lee (2006). The Heebie-Jeebies at CBGB's: A Secret History of Jewish Punk. Chicago Review Press. ISBN 1-55652-613-X.
- Bessman, Jim (1993). Ramones: An American Band. St. Martin's Press. ISBN 0-312-09369-1.
- Colegrave, Stephen, and Chris Sullivan (2005). Punk: The Definitive Record of a Revolution. Thunder's Mouth Press. ISBN 1-56025-769-5.
- Edelstein, Andrew J., and Kevin McDonough (1990). The Seventies: From Hot Pants to Hot Tubs. Dutton. ISBN 0-525-48572-4.
- Isler, Scott, and Ira A. Robbins (1991). "Ramones". Ira A. Robbins, ed. Trouser Press Record Guide (4th ed.). Collier. ISBN 0-02-036361-3. pp. 532–34.
- Johansson, Anders (2009). "Touched by Style". G. F. Mitrano and Eric Jarosinski, ed. The Hand of the Interpreter: Essays on Meaning After Theory. Peter Lang. pp. 41–60. ISBN 3-03911-118-3.
- Keithley, Joe (2004). I, Shithead: A Life in Punk. Arsenal Pulp Press. ISBN 1-55152-148-2.
- Leigh, Mickey, and Legs McNeil (2009). I Slept with Joey Ramone: A Family Memoir. Simon & Schuster. ISBN 0-7432-5216-0.
- McNeil, Legs, and Gillian McCain (1996). Please Kill Me: The Uncensored Oral History of Punk (2nd ed.), Penguin. ISBN 0-14-026690-9.
- Melnick, Monte A., and Frank Meyer (2003). On The Road with the Ramones. Sanctuary. ISBN 1-86074-514-8.
- Miles, Barry, Grant Scott, and Johnny Morgan (2005). The Greatest Album Covers of All Time. Collins & Brown. ISBN 1-84340-301-3.
- Ramone, Dee Dee, and Veronica Kofman (2000). Lobotomy: Surviving the Ramones. Thunder's Mouth Press. ISBN 1-56025-252-9.
- Ramone, Johnny (2004). Commando. Abrams Press. ISBN 978-0-8109-9660-1.
- Roach, Martin (2003). The Strokes: The First Biography of the Strokes. Omnibus Press. ISBN 0-7119-9601-6.
- Robb, John (2006). Punk Rock: An Oral History. Elbury Press. ISBN 0-09-190511-7.
- Sandford, Christopher (2006). McCartney. Century. ISBN 1-84413-602-7.
- Savage, Jon (1992). England's Dreaming: Anarchy, Sex Pistols, Punk Rock, and Beyond. St. Martin's Press. ISBN 0-312-08774-8.
- Schinder, Scott, with Andy Schwartz (2007). Icons of Rock: An Encyclopedia of the Legends Who Changed Music Forever. Greenwood Press. ISBN 0-313-33847-7.
- Shirley, Ian (2005). Can Rock & Roll Save the World?: An Illustrated History of Music and Comics. SAF Publishing. ISBN 978-0946719808.
- Spicer, Al (2003). "The Lurkers". Peter Buckley, ed. The Rough Guide to Rock (3rd ed.). Rough Guides. p. 349. ISBN 1-84353-105-4.
- Spitz, Mark, and Brendan Mullen (2001). We Got the Neutron Bomb: The Untold Story of L.A. Punk. Three Rivers Press. ISBN 0-609-80774-9.
- Stim, Richard (2006). Music Law: How to Run Your Band's Business. Nolo. ISBN 1-4133-0517-2. OCLC 69104345.
- Strongman, Phil (2008). Pretty Vacant: A History of UK Punk. Chicago Review Press. ISBN 1-55652-752-7.
- Taylor, Steven (2003). False Prophet: Field Notes from the Punk Underground. Wesleyan University Press. ISBN 0-8195-6668-3.
