= Loud, Fast Ramones: Their Toughest Hits =

Greatest hits album by The Ramones
- Released: October 15, 2002
- Recorded: 1975–1995
- Genre: Punk rock
- Length: 75:06
- Labels: Rhino Entertainment; Sire Records
- Producers: Bill Inglot; Gary Stewart; Tony Bongiovi; Graham Gouldman; Jean Beauvoir; Craig Leon; Glen Kolotkin; Phil Spector; Tommy Ramone; Ritchie Cordell; Daniel Rey; Bill Laswell; Ed Stasium; Ramones

Ramones compilation album chronology
The Chrysalis Years (2002)	Loud, Fast Ramones: Their Toughest Hits (2002)	The Best of The Ramones (2004)

Professional ratings
Review scores
Source	Rating
AllMusic	4/5 stars
Punknews.org	3.5/5 stars
The Rolling Stone Album Guide	3/5 stars

Loud, Fast Ramones: Their Toughest Hits is a compilation of Ramones songs. Curated by Johnny Ramone, the initial 50,000 copies of the album include the 8-song bonus disc Ramones Smash You: Live ’85. The bonus disc features previously unreleased live recordings made on February 25, 1985 at the Lyceum Theatre in London. It is notable for being the only officially released live recording on CD to feature Richie Ramone on drums.

== Track listing ==
All songs were written by the Ramones except where indicated.

=== Disc one ===
1. "Blitzkrieg Bop" – 2:11 (Ramones)
2. "Beat on the Brat" – 2:31 (Joey Ramone)
3. "Judy Is a Punk" – 1:31 (Joey R.)
4. "Gimme Gimme Shock Treatment" – 1:40
5. "Commando" – 1:51
6. "Glad to See You Go" – 2:10 (Lyrics: Dee Dee R. / Music: Joey R.)
7. "Pinhead" – 2:42 (Dee Dee R.)
8. "Rockaway Beach" – 2:06 (Dee Dee R.)
9. "We're a Happy Family" – 2:39
10. "Sheena Is a Punk Rocker" – 2:48 (Joey R.) - (Original ABC distributed single version)
11. "Teenage Lobotomy" – 2:01
12. "I Wanna Be Sedated" – 2:29 (Joey R.)
13. "I'm Against It" – 2:06
14. "I Wanted Everything" – 3:13 (Dee Dee R.)
15. "I Just Want to Have Something to Do" – 2:41 (Joey R.)
16. "Rock 'n' Roll High School" – 2:17 (Joey R.)
17. "Do You Remember Rock 'n' Roll Radio?" – 3:49 (Joey R.)
18. "The KKK Took My Baby Away" – 2:29 (Joey R.)
19. "Psycho Therapy" – 2:35 (Dee Dee Ramone / Johnny Ramone) - (Sire single version)
20. "Outsider" – 2:09 (Dee Dee R.)
21. "Highest Trails Above" – 2:09 (Dee Dee R.)
22. "Wart Hog" – 1:54 (Dee Dee R. / Johnny R.) /3
23. "Mama's Boy" – 2:10 (Dee Dee R. / Johnny R. / Tommy R.)
24. "Somebody Put Something in My Drink" – 3:19 (Richie Ramone)
25. "I Wanna Live" – 2:36 (Dee Dee R. / Daniel Rey)
26. "Garden of Serenity" – 2:26 (Dee Dee R. / D. Rey)
27. "I Believe in Miracles" – 3:18 (Dee Dee R. / D. Rey)
28. "Main Man" – 3:26 (Dee Dee R. / D. Rey) /4
29. "Strength to Endure" – 2:59 (Dee Dee R. / D. Rey) /4
30. "The Crusher" – 2:26 (Dee Dee R. / D. Rey) /4

The tracks on this compilation are taken from the following Ramones albums:

- 1, 2, 3 – Ramones (1976)
- 4, 5, 6, 7 – Leave Home (1977)
- 8, 9, 10, 11 – Rocket to Russia (1977)
- 12, 13, 14, 15 – Road to Ruin (1978)
- 16 – Rock 'n' Roll High School (Music From The Original Motion Picture Soundtrack) (1979)
- 17 – End of the Century (1980)
- 18 – Pleasant Dreams (1981)
- 19, 20, 21 – Subterranean Jungle (1983)
- 22, 23 – Too Tough to Die (1984)
- 24 – Animal Boy (1986)
- 25, 26 – Halfway to Sanity (1987)
- 27 – Brain Drain (1989)
- 28, 29 – Mondo Bizarro (1992)
- 30 – ¡Adios Amigos! (1995)

=== Bonus Disc ===
All live recorded at the Lyceum Theatre in London, on February 25, 1985.

1. "Do You Remember Rock 'n' Roll Radio?" – 3:16 (Joey Ramone)
2. "Psycho Therapy" – 2:04 (Dee Dee Ramone / Johnny Ramone)
3. "Suzy Is a Headbanger" – 1:37
4. "Too Tough to Die" – 2:09 (Dee Dee R.)
5. "Smash You" – 2:17 (Richie Ramone)
6. "Chinese Rock" – 1:59 (Dee Dee R. / Richard Hell)
7. "Howling at the Moon (Sha–La–La)" – 2:57 (Dee Dee R.)
8. "I Don't Wanna Go Down to the Basement" – 1:50 (Dee Dee R. / Johnny R.)

== Personnel ==
Ramones

- Joey Ramone – lead vocals
- Johnny Ramone – guitar
- Dee Dee Ramone – bass, backing vocals, lead vocals on "Wart Hog", bridge lead vocals on "Outsider"
- C. J. Ramone – bass, backing vocals, lead vocals on "Main Man", "Strength to Endure", "The Crusher"
- Marky Ramone – drums
- Richie Ramone – drums, backing vocals
- Tommy Ramone – drums

Additional musicians

- Barry Goldberg – organ, piano
- Dick Emerson – keyboards
- David Hassel – percussion
- Steve Douglas – saxophone
- Graham Gouldman – backing vocals
- Russell Mael – backing vocals
- Ian Wilson – backing vocals
- Rodney Bingenheimer – handclaps
- Harvey Robert Kubernik – handclaps
- Phast Phreddie – handclaps

Production

- Bob Gruen – Artwork, Photography
- Hugh Brown – Art Direction
- Tony Bongiovi, Graham Gouldman, Jean Beauvoir, Craig Leon, Glen Kolotkin, Phil Spector, Ritchie Cordell, Daniel Rey, Bill Laswell, The Ramones – Producer
- B.J. Papas, Jill Furmanovsky, Michael Ochs, Robert Matheu, Clemens Rikken, Danny Fields – Photography
- Brian Kehew – Mixing
- David Fricke – Liner Notes
- Johnny Ramone – Compilation
- Sean Donahue – DJ
- Dan Hersch – Remastering
- Steven P. Gorman – Photo Research
- Randy Perry, Leigh Hall – Project Assistant
- Mick McKenna – Engineer
- Bryan Lasley – Art Direction, Design
- Sheryl Farber – Editing, Editorial Supervision
- Marc Salata – Product Manager
- Steve Woolard – Discographical Annotation, Liner Notes
- George DuBose – Photography, Cover Design, Detail Analysis, Jacket Design, Inlay Design
- Ed Stasium – Producer, Engineer
- Tommy Ramone – Producer, Associate Producer, Engineer
- Bill Inglot – Compilation Producer, Remastering, Mixing
- Gary Stewart – Compilation Producer
