= Hey! Ho! Let's Go: The Anthology =

Greatest hits album by Ramones
- Released: July 20, 1999
- Recorded: 1975–1995
- Genre: Punk rock
- Length: 2:36:17
- Label: Rhino Entertainment; Sire Records
- Producer: Craig Leon; Tony Bongiovi; Tommy Ramone; Ed Stasium; Daniel Rey; Bill Inglot; Gary Stewart; Don Williams; Jean Beauvoir; Ritchie Cordell; Graham Gouldman; Glen Kolotkin; Phil Spector; Bill Laswell; Dave Stewart; The Ramones

Ramones compilation album chronology
All the Stuff (And More!) Volume 2 (1990)	Hey! Ho! Let's Go: The Anthology (1999)	Ramones Mania 2 (2000)

Professional ratings
Review scores
Source	Rating
AllMusic	4.5/5 stars
Alternative Press	4/5 stars
Entertainment Weekly	B
Q	5/5 stars
The Rolling Stone Album Guide	3.5/5 stars

Hey! Ho! Let's Go: The Anthology is a two–disc compilation that attempts to summarize the Ramones' career in its entirety. Every Ramones studio album is represented with the exception of Acid Eaters, their 1993 covers album. Some versions of this album include a hardcover 80-page booklet with liner notes by David Fricke and Danny Fields.

Two songs are billed as being previously unissued song versions: "Rock 'n' Roll High School" and "I Want You Around" are the original Ed Stasium mixes for the film Rock 'n' Roll High School, before they were remixed by Phil Spector for the accompanying soundtrack album. However, the Ed Stasium mix of "Rock 'n' Roll High School" had previously appeared on the 1988 compilation album Ramones Mania.

The album was certified platinum in Argentina as of April 24, 2001, selling more than 40,000 copies. It was also certified silver in the UK (more than 60,000 copies sold) as of December 24, 2004, and gold in Australia by 2006 selling more than 35,000 copies.

Stickers on the original boxset release advertised the collection humorously with the sum: "2 minutes + 3 chords x 58 tracks".

== Track listing ==
=== Disc one ===
All tracks are written by Ramones; except where indicated. Actual writers of all songs credited to the Ramones listed below in small font.

No.	Title	Writer(s)	Original release	Length
1.	"Blitzkrieg Bop"	Tommy Ramone, Dee Dee Ramone	1976 ~ Ramones	2:14
2.	"Beat on the Brat"	Joey Ramone	1976 ~ Ramones	2:32
3.	"Judy Is a Punk"	Joey Ramone	1976 ~ Ramones	1:32
4.	"I Wanna Be Your Boyfriend"	Tommy Ramone	1976 ~ Ramones	2:27
5.	"53rd & 3rd"	Dee Dee Ramone	1976 ~ Ramones	2:20
6.	"Now I Wanna Sniff Some Glue"	Dee Dee Ramone	1976 ~ Ramones	1:37
7.	"Glad to See You Go"	Dee Dee Ramone, Joey Ramoone	1977 ~ Leave Home	2:13
8.	"Gimme Gimme Shock Treatment"	Dee Dee Ramone, Johnny Ramone	1977 ~ Leave Home	1:44
9.	"I Remember You"	Joey Ramone	1977 ~ Leave Home	2:20
10.	"California Sun"	Henry Glover, Morris Levy	1977 ~ Leave Home	2:03
11.	"Commando"	Dee Dee Ramone, Johnny Ramone	1977 ~ Leave Home	1:54
12.	"Swallow My Pride" (Sire single version)	Joey Ramone, Dee Dee Ramone	1977 ~ Leave Home	2:07
13.	"Carbona Not Glue" (Previously only available on first LP pressings of Leave Home)	Tony Bongiovi, Tommy Ramone	1977 ~ Leave Home	1:53
14.	"Pinhead"	Joey Ramone, Johnny Ramone, Dee Dee Ramone, Tommy Ramone	1977 ~ Leave Home	2:44
15.	"Sheena Is a Punk Rocker" (Original ABC distributed single version)	Joey Ramone	1977 ~ Rocket to Russia	2:49
16.	"Cretin Hop"	Joey Ramone, Johnny Ramone, Dee Dee Ramone, Tommy Ramone	1977 ~ Rocket to Russia	1:58
17.	"Rockaway Beach"	Dee Dee Ramone	1977 ~ Rocket to Russia	2:08
18.	"Here Today, Gone Tomorrow"	Joey Ramone	1977 ~ Rocket to Russia	2:50
19.	"Teenage Lobotomy"	Tony Bongiovi, Tommy Ramone	1977 ~ Rocket to Russia	2:03
20.	"Surfin' Bird"	Carl White, Alfred Frazier, John Harris, Turner Wilson	1977 ~ Rocket to Russia	2:37
21.	"I Don't Care" (Sire single version)	Joey Ramone	1977 ~ Rocket to Russia	1:40
22.	"I Just Want to Have Something to Do"	Joey Ramone	1978 ~ Road to Ruin	2:43
23.	"I Wanna Be Sedated"	Joey Ramone	1978 ~ Road to Ruin	2:31
24.	"Don't Come Close"	Dee Dee Ramone, Joey Ramone, Johnny Ramone	1978 ~ Road to Ruin	2:46
25.	"She's the One"	Dee Dee Ramone, Joey Ramone, Johnny Ramone	1978 ~ Road to Ruin	2:15
26.	"Needles and Pins" (Sire remixed single version)	Sonny Bono, Jack Nitzsche	1978 ~ Road to Ruin	2:23
27.	"Rock 'n' Roll High School" (Ed Stasium Mix)	Johnny Ramone, Dee Dee Ramone, Joey Ramone	Rock 'n' Roll High School film	2:21
28.	"I Want You Around" (Ed Stasium Mix)	Dee Dee R. / Joey R. / Johnny Ramone	Rock 'n' Roll High School film	3:02
29.	"Do You Remember Rock 'n' Roll Radio?"	Dee Dee Ramone, Joey Ramone, Johnny Ramone	1980 ~ End of the Century	3:52
30.	"I Can't Make It on Time"	Dee Dee Ramone, Joey Ramone, Johnny Ramone	1980 ~ End of the Century	2:33
31.	"Chinese Rocks"	Dee Dee Ramone, Richard Hell	1980 ~ End of the Century	2:30
32.	"I'm Affected"	Joey Ramone	1980 ~ End of the Century	2:54
33.	"Danny Says"	Joey Ramone	1980 ~ End of the Century	3:06

=== Disc two ===
No.	Title	Writer(s)	Original release	Length
1.	"The KKK Took My Baby Away"	Joey Ramone	1981 ~ Pleasant Dreams	2:31
2.	"She's a Sensation"	Joey Ramone	1981 ~ Pleasant Dreams	3:26
3.	"It's Not My Place (In the 9 to 5 World)"	Joey Ramone	1981 ~ Pleasant Dreams	3:23
4.	"We Want the Airwaves"	Joey Ramone	1981 ~ Pleasant Dreams	3:22
5.	"Psycho Therapy"	Johnny Ramone, Dee Dee Ramone	1983 ~ Subterranean Jungle	2:39
6.	"Howling at the Moon (Sha–La–La)"	Dee Dee Ramone	1984 ~ Too Tough to Die	4:06
7.	"Mama's Boy"	Johnny Ramone, Dee Dee Ramone, Tommy Ramone	1984 ~ Too Tough to Die	2:12
8.	"Daytime Dilemma (Dangers of Love)"	Joey Ramone, Daniel Rey	1984 ~ Too Tough to Die	4:33
9.	"I'm Not Afraid of Life"	Dee Dee Ramone	1984 ~ Too Tough to Die	3:13
10.	"Too Tough to Die"	Dee Dee Ramone	1984 ~ Too Tough to Die	2:38
11.	"Endless Vacation"	Dee Dee Ramone, Johnny Ramone	1984 ~ Too Tough to Die	1:50
12.	"My Brain Is Hanging Upside Down (Bonzo Goes to Bitburg)" (UK 12" version)	Dee Dee Ramone, Joey Ramone, Jean Beauvoir	1986 ~ Animal Boy	3:57
13.	"Somebody Put Something in My Drink"	Richie Ramone	1986 ~ Animal Boy	3:23
14.	"Something to Believe In" (Sire single version)	Dee Dee Ramone, Jean Beauvoir	1986 ~ Animal Boy	4:09
15.	"I Don't Want to Live This Life (Anymore)"	Dee Dee R.	Originally issued as a B–side on the "Crummy Stuff" UK 12" single.	3:29
16.	"I Wanna Live"	Dee Dee R. / D. Rey	1987 ~ Halfway to Sanity	2:39
17.	"Garden of Serenity"	Dee Dee R. / D. Rey	1987 ~ Halfway to Sanity	2:28
18.	"Merry Christmas (I Don't Want to Fight Tonight)" (Sire single version)	Joey R.	1989 ~ Brain Drain	2:05
19.	"Pet Sematary" (Sire single version)	Dee Dee R. / D. Rey	1989 ~ Brain Drain	3:34
20.	"I Believe in Miracles"	Dee Dee R. / D. Rey	1989 ~ Brain Drain	3:21
21.	"Tomorrow She Goes Away"	Joey R. / D. Rey	1992 ~ Mondo Bizarro	2:41
22.	"Poison Heart"	Dee Dee R. / D. Rey	1992 ~ Mondo Bizzaro	4:04
23.	"I Don't Want to Grow Up"	Tom Waits / Kathleen Brennan	1995 ~ ¡Adios Amigos!	2:46
24.	"She Talks to Rainbows"	Joey R.	1995 ~ ¡Adios Amigos!	3:14
25.	"R.A.M.O.N.E.S." (Bonus track from the Japanese edition of ¡Adios Amigos! with vocals by C. J. Ramone)	Lemmy / Würzel / Phil Campbell / Phil Taylor	1995 ~ ¡Adios Amigos!	1:24

== Reissue ==
In 2001 (possibly because of Joey Ramone's death), Hey! Ho! Let's Go: The Anthology was re-released. This new version did not include the 80-page booklet and altered the track listing of CD 1. "I'm Affected" and "I Can't Make it on Time" were removed and replaced with "Baby I Love You", which was the band's highest-charting hit in the UK.

== Personnel ==
Ramones

- Joey Ramone – lead vocals
- Johnny Ramone – guitar
- Dee Dee Ramone – bass guitar, backing vocals (disc 1: all tracks; disc 2: tracks 1–20)
- C. J. Ramone – bass guitar, backing vocals (disc 2: tracks 21–25)
- Marky Ramone – drums (disc 1: tracks 22–33; disc 2: tracks 1–5, 18–25)
- Richie Ramone – drums (disc 2: tracks 6–17)
- Tommy Ramone – drums (disc 1: tracks 1–21)

Additional musicians

- Barry Goldberg – organ, piano
- Benmont Tench – keyboards
- Steve Douglas – saxophone
- Graham Gouldman – backing vocals
- Russell Mael – backing vocals
- Ian Wilson – backing vocals
- Rodney Bingenheimer – handclaps
- Harvey Robert Kubernick – handclaps

Production

- Jean Beauvoir – mixing, original version recording producer, producer
- Don Berman, Ian Bryan, Ron Cote, John Dixon, DJ Walker Bruce, Gold Andy Hoffman, Don Hünerberg, Ray Janos, Tom Lester, Robbie Norris, Garris Shipon, Harry Spiridakis, Joe Warda – assistant engineer
- Keith Bessey, Robert Musso, Anders Oredson – engineer, mixing
- Martin Bisi, Jorge Esteban, Harvey Goldberg, Judy Kirschner, Larry Levine, Boris Menart, Chris Nagle – engineer
- Joe Blaney, Jason Corsaro – mixing
- Tony Bongiovi, Ritchie Cordell, Graham Gouldman, Glen Kolotkin, Craig Leon, The Ramones, Phil Spector – original recording producer, producer
- Sean Donahue – DJ
- Tommy Ramone – associate producer, engineer, original recording producer, producer
- Danny Fields, David Fricke – liner notes
- Oz Fritz, Glenn Rosenstein – mixing assistant
- Bryce Goggin – assistant engineer, engineer
- Paul Hamingson – engineer, mixing assistant
- Bill Inglot, Gary Stewart, Don Williams – compilation producer
- Gary Kurfirst – executive producer
- Bill Laswell, Dave Stewart – producer
- Daniel Rey – musical coordination, original recording producer, producer
- Donna Sekulidis – production coordination
- Joel Soiffer – remixing
- Ed Stasium – engineer, mixing, musical director, original recording producer, producer

== Charts ==
Chart (1999–2001)	Peak position
Belgian Albums (Ultratop Wallonia)	46
Italian Albums (FIMI)	39
Scottish Albums (OCC)	44
Swedish Albums (Sverigetopplistan)	13
UK Albums (OCC)	74
UK Rock & Metal Albums (OCC)	6

Chart (2006)	Peak position
Spanish Albums (PROMUSICAE)	32

Chart (2024)	Peak position
Croatian International Albums (HDU)	25

== Certifications ==
Region	Certification	Certified units/sales
Argentina (CAPIF)	Platinum	60,000^{^}
Australia (ARIA)	Gold	35,000^{^}
Spain (PROMUSICAE)	Gold	50,000^{^}
United Kingdom (BPI)	Gold	100,000^{^}
^{^} Shipments figures based on certification alone.
