= Ramones Mania =

Greatest hits album by Ramones
- Released: May 31, 1988
- Recorded: 1976–1987
- Genre: Punk rock
- Length: 76:45
- Label: Sire
- Producers: Ramones, Jean Beauvoir, Tony Bongiovi, Ritchie Cordell, Tommy Ramone, Graham Gouldman, Glen Kolotkin, Kevin Laffey, Craig Leon, Daniel Rey, Phil Spector, Ed Stasium, Dave Stewart

Ramones compilation album chronology
| Ramones Mania (1988) | All the Stuff (And More!) Vol. 1 (1990) |

Professional ratings
Review scores
| Source | Rating |
|---|---|
| AllMusic | 4.5/5 stars |
| Robert Christgau | B |
| The Rolling Stone Album Guide | 4/5 stars |

Ramones Mania is the first greatest hits album by the American punk rock band the Ramones. It was released on May 31, 1988, through Sire Records and consists of 30 Ramones songs, including some single versions ("Sheena Is a Punk Rocker", "Needles & Pins" and "Howling at the Moon"), a single B-side ("Indian Giver") and one previously unreleased take (the film version of "Rock 'n' Roll High School").

The album contains a booklet with a short history of the Ramones, including the release dates of all their albums. Their best-selling album, the compilation was their only album certified Gold in the United States, until their debut album went Gold in 2014.

Ramones Mania was re-released on multi-colored vinyl for Record Store Day in 2010. A sequel was released in Japan in 2000. A tribute album titled Ramones Maniacs was released in 2001; it featured turn-of-the-century punk bands covering every song from Mania in the same order.

== Track listing ==
Side one
| No. | Title | Writer(s) | Source album | Length |
|---|---|---|---|---|
| 1. | "I Wanna Be Sedated" | Joey Ramone | Road to Ruin (1978) | 2:29 |
| 2. | "Teenage Lobotomy" | Dee Dee Ramone | Rocket to Russia (1977) | 2:00 |
| 3. | "Do You Remember Rock 'n' Roll Radio?" | Joey | End of the Century (1980) | 3:50 |
| 4. | "Gimme Gimme Shock Treatment" | Dee Dee, Johnny Ramone | Leave Home (1977) | 1:40 |
| 5. | "Beat on the Brat" | Joey | Ramones (1976) | 2:30 |
| 6. | "Sheena Is a Punk Rocker" (single version) | Joey | Rocket to Russia | 2:47 |
| 7. | "I Wanna Live" | Dee Dee, Daniel Rey | Halfway to Sanity (1987) | 2:36 |
| 8. | "Pinhead" | Dee Dee | Leave Home | 2:42 |

Side two
| No. | Title | Writer(s) | Source album | Length |
|---|---|---|---|---|
| 1. | "Blitzkrieg Bop" | Tommy Ramone, Dee Dee | Ramones | 2:12 |
| 2. | "Cretin Hop" | Tommy, Dee Dee, Johnny | Rocket to Russia | 1:55 |
| 3. | "Rockaway Beach" | Dee Dee | Rocket to Russia | 2:06 |
| 4. | "Commando" | Dee Dee | Leave Home | 1:50 |
| 5. | "I Wanna Be Your Boyfriend" | Tommy | Ramones | 2:24 |
| 6. | "Mama's Boy" | Dee Dee, Johnny, Tommy | Too Tough to Die (1984) | 2:09 |
| 7. | "Bop 'Til You Drop" | Dee Dee, Johnny | Halfway to Sanity | 2:09 |
| 8. | "We're a Happy Family" | Joey | Rocket to Russia | 2:39 |

Side three
| No. | Title | Writer(s) | Source album | Length |
|---|---|---|---|---|
| 1. | "Bonzo Goes to Bitburg" | Dee Dee, Joey, Jean Beauvoir | Animal Boy (1986) | 3:57 |
| 2. | "Outsider" | Dee Dee | Subterranean Jungle (1983) | 2:10 |
| 3. | "Psycho Therapy" | Johnny, Dee Dee | Subterranean Jungle | 2:35 |
| 4. | "Wart Hog" | Dee Dee | Too Tough to Die | 1:54 |
| 5. | "Animal Boy" | Dee Dee, Johnny | Animal Boy | 1:50 |
| 6. | "Needles & Pins" (single version) | Sonny Bono, Jack Nitzsche | Road to Ruin | 2:22 |
| 7. | "Howling at the Moon (Sha-La-La)" (single edit) | Dee Dee | Too Tough to Die | 3:25 |

Side four
| No. | Title | Writer(s) | Source album | Length |
|---|---|---|---|---|
| 1. | "Somebody Put Something in My Drink" | Richie Ramone | Animal Boy | 3:23 |
| 2. | "We Want the Airwaves" | Joey | Pleasant Dreams (1981) | 3:20 |
| 3. | "Chinese Rock" | Dee Dee, Richard Hell | End of the Century | 2:28 |
| 4. | "I Just Wanna Have Something to Do" | Joey | Road to Ruin | 2:41 |
| 5. | "The KKK Took My Baby Away" | Joey | Pleasant Dreams | 2:31 |
| 6. | "Indian Giver" | Bobby Bloom, Ritchie Cordell, Bo Gentry | B-side of "Real Cool Time" single (1987) | 2:45 |
| 7. | "Rock 'n' Roll High School" (stereo movie mix) | Joey | Rock 'n' Roll High School film (1979) | 2:14 |
| Total length: | | | | 76:45 |

== Personnel ==
Ramones

- Joey Ramone – vocals
- Johnny Ramone – guitar
- Dee Dee Ramone – bass, background vocals; lead vocals ("Wart Hog")
- Tommy Ramone – drums (Ramones, Leave Home, Rocket to Russia)
- Marky Ramone – drums (Road to Ruin, "Rock 'n' Roll High School", End of the Century, Pleasant Dreams, Subterranean Jungle, "Indian Giver")
- Richie Ramone – drums, background vocals (Too Tough to Die, Animal Boy, Halfway to Sanity)

Technical

- Craig Leon – producer (Ramones)
- Tony Bongiovi – co-producer (Leave Home, Rocket to Russia)
- Tommy Ramone – co-producer (Leave Home, Rocket to Russia, Road to Ruin, Too Tough to Die)
- Ed Stasium – producer ("Rock 'n' Roll High School"), co-producer (Road to Ruin, Too Tough to Die), digital remastering
- Phil Spector – producer (End of the Century)
- Graham Gouldman – producer (Pleasant Dreams)
- Ritchie Cordell – co-producer (Subterranean Jungle, "Indian Giver")
- Glen Kolotkin – co-producer (Subterranean Jungle, "Indian Giver")
- Jean Beauvoir – producer (Animal Boy)
- Daniel Rey – co-producer (Halfway to Sanity)
- Ramones – co-producer (Halfway to Sanity)
- Arturo Vega – collage design, lighting director
- George DuBose – design coordinator, front cover photo
- Mark Weinberg – art director
- Ebet Roberts – back cover photo
- Ed Valentine – inner sleeve illustration
- Greg Calbi – digital remastering
- Kevin Laffey – compilation producer

== Charts ==
| Chart (1988) | Peak position |
|---|---|
| Canada Top Albums/CDs (RPM) | 84 |
| Japanese Albums (Oricon) | 95 |
| US Billboard 200 | 166 |

== Certifications ==
| Region | Certification | Certified units/sales |
|---|---|---|
| Argentina (CAPIF) | Gold | 30,000^{^} |
| United States (RIAA) | Gold | 500,000^{^} |
^{^} Shipments figures based on certification alone.
