= I Just Want to Have Something to Do =

Song by Ramones

from the album Road to Ruin
- Released: September 21, 1978
- Recorded: 1978
- Genre: Punk rock
- Length: 2:42
- Label: Sire
- Songwriter: Joey Ramone
- Producers: Tommy Ramone, Ed Stasium

"I Just Want to Have Something to Do" is a song credited to the Ramones. It was written by Joey Ramone and was released as the opening song of the band's 1978 album Road to Ruin. It was also released on several of the band's compilation albums, and was used in the film Rock 'n' Roll High School.

Allmusic critic Donald A. Guarisco described "I Just Want to Have Something to Do" as "one of the best expressions of frustrated desire to ever grace the world of pop music." The song is taken at midtempo, slower than the typical Ramones song. The lyrics describe the singer's need to connect with the listener, and themes include ambivalence and anomie. Authors Scott Schinder and Andy Schwartz comment on the surprising rhyme of Second Avenue with chicken vindaloo. Ramones biographer Everett True calls this rhyme "evocative". Music professor Robert Pattison suggests that this lyric was too much "fun", as opposed to "joyous", to be respectable enough to be included in a freshman anthology, but he nonetheless considers it a "rock classic".

Guarisco considers the music to effectively evoke the frustration described in the lyrics by using "twisted, ascending note patterns" in the verses to create a "yearning feel". He also states that the music in the refrain enhances the yearning effect with its "sense of swing". True states that the song evokes a sense of "pent-up energy" through "shards of guitar and feedback" which "riccochet past your ear". Guarisco also praises Joey Ramone's lead vocal for the way his snarling and pleading build to an angry peak in the refrain.

"I Just Want to Have Something to Do" was included on several Ramones compilation albums, including Hey! Ho! Let's Go: The Anthology in 1999 and Greatest Hits in 2006.
