= Halfway to Sanity =

Studio album by Ramones
- Released: September 15, 1987
- Recorded: April 1987
- Studio: Intergalactic, New York City
- Genre: Punk rock; hard rock
- Length: 29:53
- Label: Sire
- Producer: Daniel Rey; Ramones

Ramones chronology
Animal Boy (1986)	Halfway to Sanity (1987)	Brain Drain (1989)

Singles from Halfway to Sanity
- 1. "Real Cool Time" b/w "Indian Giver" Released: September 1987; 2. "I Wanna Live" b/w "Merry Christmas (I Don't Want To Fight Tonight)" Released: November 1987

Halfway to Sanity is the tenth studio album by the American punk rock band Ramones, and their last album to feature drummer Richie Ramone. It was produced by Daniel Rey and released on September 15, 1987, by Sire Records. Recording sessions began that April at Intergalactic Studios in New York City, with the band recording instruments before vocals in order to learn songs more quickly. It fared well on charts outside the United States, but peaked at No. 172 on the Billboard 200.

The band members disagreed on many things during the album's production, and producer Rey described them as impatient. The band toured the world following the album's release, but certain show dates were cancelled after Richie left the band due to financial conflicts with Johnny. The band hired Blondie drummer Clem Burke (who took the pseudonym "Elvis Ramone") for two shows, until Marky Ramone returned.

Genres varied significantly throughout the album, with some songs showing the influence of hard rock, heavy metal music, and crossover thrash, while others showcased a bubblegum pop sound. Additionally, Joey is heard singing a duet with Blondie vocalist Debbie Harry on "Go Lil' Camaro Go". Despite receiving mixed critical reviews, Stephen Thomas Erlewine later wrote that the album was the last time the band "still sounded like they mattered."

== Background ==
Before producing the album, Daniel Rey had opened for the Ramones in the late 1970s as a member of Shrapnel. He had worked with lead singer Joey Ramone and lead guitarist Johnny Ramone separately when writing songs for Too Tough to Die. "I was producing a lot of young bands in my basement," Rey explained. "Johnny heard one and said, 'It's better than our last record.' He knew that he could get me cheap and I was the only person who got along with Johnny and Joey at the same time." In his 2012 autobiography, Commando, Johnny Ramone stated that this period was a "stressful time" for the band.

== Production ==
Recording sessions for Halfway to Sanity began in early 1987 at Intergalactic Studios in New York City, described by Rey as "a dingy place in midtown". Drums, guitars and bass guitar were all recorded earlier in the afternoon, while the vocal track was always recorded later in the evening. Rey explained that they did this because "it was quicker to learn songs without any vocal, so they did." Joey, however, wanted to work out "how to phrase his singing" and was not a fan of this method of recording. Johnny stated that Dee Dee Ramone, while credited as bass player on the album, didn't actually play on it, with producer Daniel Rey playing his parts instead.

On the band's relationship with producer Daniel Rey, Johnny stated that no one involved with the album would listen to Rey nor let him make the decisions he needed to, adding that Joey and drummer Richie Ramone made it particularly difficult for Rey because they wanted to remix or change tracks. Richie did not get along with Rey, saying that the two would "butt heads" often because he only liked writing songs with one other person. Richie has explained that this may have been the reason why he never co-wrote any songs on the album with Joey, saying that Rey "always came with the package". Tour manager Monte Melnick, on the other hand, said Rey eventually befriended all the band members. In 2018, Richie stated that the rift between him and Rey occurred when Richie remixed five songs on the album on a request from Joey and although Johnny approved the work, he refused to credit him for it on the album.

Richie added that Johnny, along with their manager Gary Kurfirst, made the album process difficult by keeping the band on a tight budget. He explained that he wanted the music to be more radio-friendly and promote it more so they might have a hit album, but Johnny and Kurfirst did not think it would make a difference. Richie would later recall: "Why would you not want an album to be as successful as it could be? Gary Kurfirst seemed to want to keep the Ramones an underground band, I guess his thinking was, he'd profit more."

The band's publicist Ida Langsam agreed that the band and their record company all felt the need to keep to a strict budget for recording, production and promotion of the Ramones' music. She pointed out that just because much of their album process was done "cut-rate," it did not mean that their performance on the album was not done well. Rather they were trying to find people who could do things more cheaply, along with cheaper places to record, such as Intergalactic Studios, where they had also recorded their previous album, Animal Boy. Langsam went on to say that the Ramones were "never afforded the respect a band of their caliber should have," insisting that other bands who were "much less worthy" were more respected. "Everybody thought of them as the local band," she continued, "everybody's friends—'when are you going to break, when are you going to get big, when are you going to reach stardom?'"

Rey claimed that the band was very impatient during the album process, and noted that members, especially Johnny and Joey, weren't getting along. "John was fast in the studio," recalls George Tabb, who was recording with his band the False Prophets at Intergalactic at the same time the Ramones recorded Halfway to Sanity. He called it humorous "because John would be going, 'Enough, enough, it sounds right.' And Joey, the artist, would go, 'I gotta do my vocals, I gotta do my vocals,' and the drummer's going, 'But my drums!' Johnny was like, 'Fuck it. It's the Ramones. It is what it is and comes out like that.' And he was right. It was the Ramones. He was a good businessman about it."

In his book Commando, Johnny Ramone concluded that "the tracks on this one aren't the best. I always had a problem bringing songs into the band unless I was sure they were going to be very good. [...] The other guys brought in things that sucked, but they acted like they were great." However, he cited "I Wanna Live", "Weasel Face", "Bop 'til You Drop" and "Garden of Serenity" as the album's highlights and awarded the album a "B−" grade.

This is the first Ramones album since Leave Home—and their last—to clock in at under 30 minutes.

== Musical style and lyrics ==
The album's opening track, "I Wanna Live", features heavy feedback and a musical style closer to hard rock than punk. Described by author Dave Thompson as similar to contemporary "romantic melodies," the song was written by Dee Dee, who quoted the lyrics "As I load my pistol / Fine German steel" years later in a photo session with Ken Hinchey and Mike Vought as he loaded a gun. The song runs 2 minutes 39 seconds and despite its brevity was called "too long" by music journalist Everett True. Both the next track, "Bop 'Til You Drop", and the fifth track, "Go Lil' Camaro Go", were described by True as "dire 'fun,'" saying it sounded "as if they've been tossed off in a couple seconds—and probably were" and that Joey sang with a "drink-ravaged voice". Thompson wrote that "Go Lil' Camaro Go", a duet with Blondie's Debbie Harry, had a style similar to bubblegum pop. Track three, "Garden of Serenity", incorporates elements used in crossover thrash. The next track is "Weasel Face", written by Dee Dee and Johnny about, according to Johnny, a fan "who had a real weasel face. He came to all our gigs in the South; he followed us around. I think he was from Mississippi." Side A concludes with Richie's "I Know Better", which, along with "Go Lil' Camaro Go", was described by AllMusic reviewer Stephen Thomas Erlewine as having a "solid" hook.

Joey wrote the opening track for Side B, "Death of Me", as well as "A Real Cool Time", which True said was a tribute to "summer beach" parties and "New York Cat Clubs," and compared the melody line to the Who's "The Kids Are Alright". The album's longest song is track 11, "Bye Bye Baby", at 4 minutes 33 seconds. It was described as a "tear-jerking" piece by True, and was influenced by '50s/early '60s girl group pop. He wrote that it features a "beautiful chiming guitar sound" that "stands out like a sore thumb" compared to the other songs on the album, because Joey "sings instead of shouting". The song was deemed "Phil Spector-ish" in the WEG Publication's Digital Audio and Compact Disc Review, who also described the album's final track, "Worm Man", as having a "hardcore punk thrashing" style. while True said the latter was similar to the work of Black Flag.

== Cover art and photography ==
I shoot three rolls, Johnny says, 'That's enough.' I say, 'Okay, Johnny. Want to go to another location?' and he says, 'No.' So I say, 'Monte [Melnick], Warner Brothers gave me $7,500, I can't give them three rolls of film. They'll skin me.' Monte shrugs, 'Don't worry about it. Johnny doesn't want any more pictures.'

— George DuBose

The photography for Halfway to Sanity was done by George DuBose, who had also done photography for the band's previous three releases (Subterranean Jungle, Too Tough to Die, and Animal Boy). The front cover's picture was taken in an old stairwell in Chinatown, where they had DuBose's cousin and his cousin's friend—who are credited as "Husky Bros." on the Halfway to Sanity liner notes—block off the crowd while the photo session was in place. DuBose and other crew members set up red lighting and a fog machine. After DuBose's camera went through three reels of film, Johnny insisted that was enough, to which DuBose replied that the record company was paying him a lot of money for the shoot, so they should make it worthwhile. The session, however, only lasted 10 to 15 minutes, and was done in a poorly lit area, which Johnny said was "pretty good not to make us look old, and it was getting harder and harder." The back cover photograph features green tombstones in a Jewish cemetery. Dubose's photos for the inner sleeve depict "Peking ducks hanging in the window of a restaurant, with glaze dripping off their tails."

== Tour and personnel changes ==
To promote the album, the band played a handful of gigs in South America in February 1987. During the spring and summer of 1987, they toured the United States. At a concert on August 12 in East Hampton, New York, Richie left the band due to financial conflicts with Johnny. Richie stated that he had asked to be given a small percentage of the merchandise income based on his tenure with the band and their use of his name and image, which he claimed Joey and Dee Dee was in favor of, but Johnny would refuse. Richie said that he never felt entitled to a large share as he was not a founding member, but that it was about being a part of the band rather than a hired hand and mentioned feeling left out on tours when the other members would go cash their merchandise checks. Joey would later state, "I felt screwed. Me and Richie were friends. He was more than just the drummer. But he was out for himself. He said he would do the New York shows for $500 a night. I'm sure he felt he had us by the balls, as our album was coming out." Richie later said that he had heard a rumour that Johnny was going to fire him even if he played the shows and that convinced him not to come back to the band. DuBose also explained that Richie "quit right before a gig and wasn't very professional."

Johnny began asking around to see if they could find a replacement drummer, at least for the remainder of the tour. Clem Burke of Blondie filled in for Richie for two shows, performing under the alias Elvis Ramone, on August 28 in Providence, Rhode Island and August 29 in Trenton, New Jersey. Johnny deemed the whole situation a "disaster" because of Burke's drumming style, commenting that "double-time on the hi-hat was totally alien to him". Burke was criticized for playing "Durango 95"'s fills incorrectly, and for misplaying the introduction on "Do You Remember Rock 'n' Roll Radio?", forcing Johnny and Dee Dee to improvise on stage. He was also reportedly unable to maintain the faster tempo of the songs "Freak of Nature" and "Gimme Gimme Shock Treatment".

Because of this, the band's previous drummer, Marky Ramone (who had replaced original drummer Tommy Ramone), was asked to return. He had been fired after Subterranean Jungle, partially for his drumming style but mostly because of his alcoholism. Once he was sober, however, he began playing in Richie Stotts's heavy metal band King Flux, as well as his own band, M-80. Richie's response to Marky's return was that it "would never happen" but it did. Marky had a meeting with John, rehearsed a couple of Ramones songs and said, "Marc, it's like you never left."

Within a week of Burke's departure, Marky was touring with the band again. The first show Marky played was on September 4 in Oyster Bay, Long Island.

During a sold-out Paris concert, fans who were not able to get in to see the performance began to throw stones at the venue, and were consequently tear-gassed by police. It was also common to see moshing and stage diving at their shows, but the band members discouraged this type of behavior. "They hated it and they tried to stop it as much as possible," artist and the band's lighting director Arturo Vega recalled, "but it would happen. Kids are really resourceful. Once the lawsuits started coming in, a lot of clubs tried to ban it, too. Sometimes the security made it difficult for them, you know. Once, we were in Tijuana—and of course in Tijuana, who cares! They were jumping from a balcony that was at least 20 feet (6 m) high. Jumping into the crowd. It was too much. It was great."

The band was banned from playing at Boston University on the grounds that they promoted "rowdiness, destructiveness, and drug use". In response, the university's Program Council organized an anti-censorship protest rally in Marsh Plaza. At the rally, Joey announced, "We're here to uphold the honor of the students and the Ramones," and pointed out that their performances never incited violence. The Ramones' 1988 tour would have roughly a hundred gigs in the United States, Finland, Japan, United Kingdom, and elsewhere. While touring in Puerto Rico, the band performed for around 2,000 surfers at the World Surfing Championships. These shows were dubbed the "Ramones Non-Stop World Tour" by fans.

== Reception ==
Professional ratings
Review scores
Source	Rating
AllMusic	1.5/5 stars
Robert Christgau	C+
Spin Alternative Record Guide	2/10

=== Critical ===
Halfway to Sanity received mixed reviews from critics. When it was released in September 1987, the New York Post praised it as another well produced album by the Ramones, and Billboard said Sire should have released "Go Lil' Camaro Go" as a single. Village Voice critic Robert Christgau gave the album a "C+", writing that, while he felt pained to say it, "with Richie or whoever on the lam, Dee Dee moonlighting as a punk-rapper, Joey frequenting all-acoustic showcases, and Johnny Johnny, a great band has finally worn down into a day job for night people." However, in the United Kingdom, the album received virtually no attention from professional critics. Ramones fanzine writer Mark Bannister explained that critics there thought the album "didn't sound right without some more of Joey's songs to balance out Dee Dee's. There was no equilibrium."

In a retrospective review, Stephen Thomas Erlewine of AllMusic gave the album one and a half stars out of five, calling it a "much sharper record" than its predecessor only because it did not overlook the band's "trashy pop roots". While he found the album to be "inconsistent", he praised it as the last release where the band "still sounded like they mattered".

=== Commercial ===
The album entered the US Billboard 200 on October 10, 1987, at position 174, moving to its peak at 172 one week later, and spent its last week on the chart at No. 200 on October 24. It peaked at No. 78 on the UK Albums Chart the same day it entered the Billboard chart, although it only ranked in the United Kingdom for one week. On the Netherlands MegaCharts, the album entered at its peak position of 68 on October 10, 1987, staying on the chart for a single week as well. Likewise, it only stayed on the on Swedish Sverigetopplistan chart for one week, peaking at No. 43 on September 14, 1987.

== Later use ==
Two of the tracks on Halfway to Sanity, "Bop 'Til You Drop" and "I Wanna Live", were featured on the band's first compilation album release, Ramones Mania. Both "Garden of Serenity" and "I Wanna Live" were included on the Hey! Ho! Let's Go: The Anthology greatest hits compilation, but no songs from the album were featured on Greatest Hits. The 2006 video game Tony Hawk's Project 8 featured "I Wanna Live" on the soundtrack, and the Polish metal band Behemoth covered "I'm Not Jesus" on their 2008 extended play Ezkaton.

== Track listing ==
Side one
No.	Title	Writer(s)	Length
1.	"I Wanna Live"	Dee Dee Ramone, Daniel Rey	2:36
2.	"Bop 'Til You Drop"	D. Ramone, Johnny Ramone	2:09
3.	"Garden of Serenity"	D. Ramone, Rey	2:35
4.	"Weasel Face"	D. Ramone, Johnny Ramone	1:49
5.	"Go Lil' Camaro Go"	D. Ramone	2:00
6.	"I Know Better Now"	Richie Ramone	2:37

Side two
No.	Title	Writer(s)	Length
7.	"Death of Me"	Joey Ramone	2:39
8.	"I Lost My Mind"	D. Ramone, Johnny Ramone	1:33
9.	"A Real Cool Time"	Joey Ramone	2:38
10.	"I'm Not Jesus"	R. Ramone	2:52
11.	"Bye Bye Baby"	Joey Ramone	4:33
12.	"Worm Man"	D. Ramone	1:52

== Personnel ==
Ramones

- Joey Ramone – lead vocals (tracks 1–7, 9–12)
- Johnny Ramone – guitar
- Dee Dee Ramone – bass guitar, backing vocals, lead vocals (track 8)
- Richie Ramone – drums, backing vocals

Additional musicians

- Debbie Harry – backing vocals (track 5)
- Walter Lure – additional guitar
- Daniel Rey – bass guitar

Production

- Jorge Esteban – engineering
- Howard Shillingford – assistant engineer
- DJ Walker – assistant engineer
- Joe Blaney – mixing
- Richie Ramone – mixing (uncredited)
- Jack Skinner – mastering
- George DuBose – photography, cover design
- Mark Weinberg – art direction

== Charts ==
Chart (1987)	Peak position
Dutch Albums (Album Top 100)	68
Finnish Albums (The Official Finnish Charts)	24
Swedish Albums (Sverigetopplistan)	43
UK Albums (OCC)	78
US Billboard 200	172

== See also ==
- 1987 in music
- Ramones discography
