= Richard Whitley =

American screenwriter and producer

- Born: Elmhurst, Illinois, U.S.
- Occupations: Screenwriter; Producer; Lyricist; Actor
- Years active: 1978–present
- Notable work: Rock 'n' Roll High School

Richard Whitley is an American screenwriter, producer, lyricist, and actor best known for his work on Rock 'n' Roll High School.

== Career ==
Richard Whitley was born in Elmhurst, Illinois, to Marian and Edward F. Whitley. He had an older half-brother, John Hill, who was a game designer. Whitley began his career by writing the script for Roger Corman's Rock 'n' Roll High School (1979). His work on Rock 'n' Roll High School led to writing for several TV shows, including Delta House, Homefront, TV Nation, Space: Above and Beyond, Roseanne, Millennium, Recess, Roswell, The Others, Lloyd in Space, Canterbury's Law, and Pound Puppies. On July 31, 2008, it was announced that actor/writer Alex Winter had been hired to script a remake of Rock 'n' Roll High School for Howard Stern's production company.

== Filmography ==
=== Film ===
Year	Title	Credited as			Notes
Year	Title	Writer	Producer	Actor	Notes
1978	Deathsport	No	No	Yes	Role: Mutant
1979	Rock 'n' Roll High School	Yes	No	No	
1982	Pandemonium	Yes	Associate	Yes	Role: Man #3 in Restaurant
1991	Rock 'n' Roll High School Forever	Yes	No	No	Based on characters created by
2004	Straight into Darkness	No	No	No	Special thanks
2006	America: Freedom to Fascism	No	Yes	No	
TBA	Untitled Rock 'n' Roll High School remake	Yes	No	No	Based on characters created by

=== Television ===
Year	Title	Credited as		Notes
Year	Title	Writer	Lyricist	Notes
1979	Delta House	Yes	No	Episode: "The Guns of October"
1992–1993	Homefront	Yes	Yes	Episodes: "The Lemo Tomato Juice Hour", "Signed, Crazy in Love", "On the Rebound"
1994	TV Nation	Yes	No	Also producer
1996	Space: Above and Beyond	Yes	No	Episodes: "Dear Earth", "Pearly"
1997	Roseanne	Yes	No	Episodes: "Lanford's Elite", "Roseanne-Feld"
1998	Millennium	Yes	No	Episode: "Goodbye Charlie"
1999	Recess	Yes	No	Episodes: "The First Picture Show", "Gus' Fortune", "The Dude"
2000	Roswell	Yes	No	Episode: "Tess, Lies and Videotape"
2000	The Others	Yes	No	Episode: "$4.95 a Minute"
2001–2002	Lloyd in Space	Yes	No	Episodes: "Lloyd Changes His Mind", "Francine's Power Trip", "Lloyd's Lost Weekend", "Neither Boy Nor Girl"
2008	Canterbury's Law	Yes	No	Episode: "Sick as Your Secrets"
2012	Pound Puppies	Yes	Yes	Episode: "No Dogs Allowed"
