= Richie Ramone =

American drummer (born 1956)

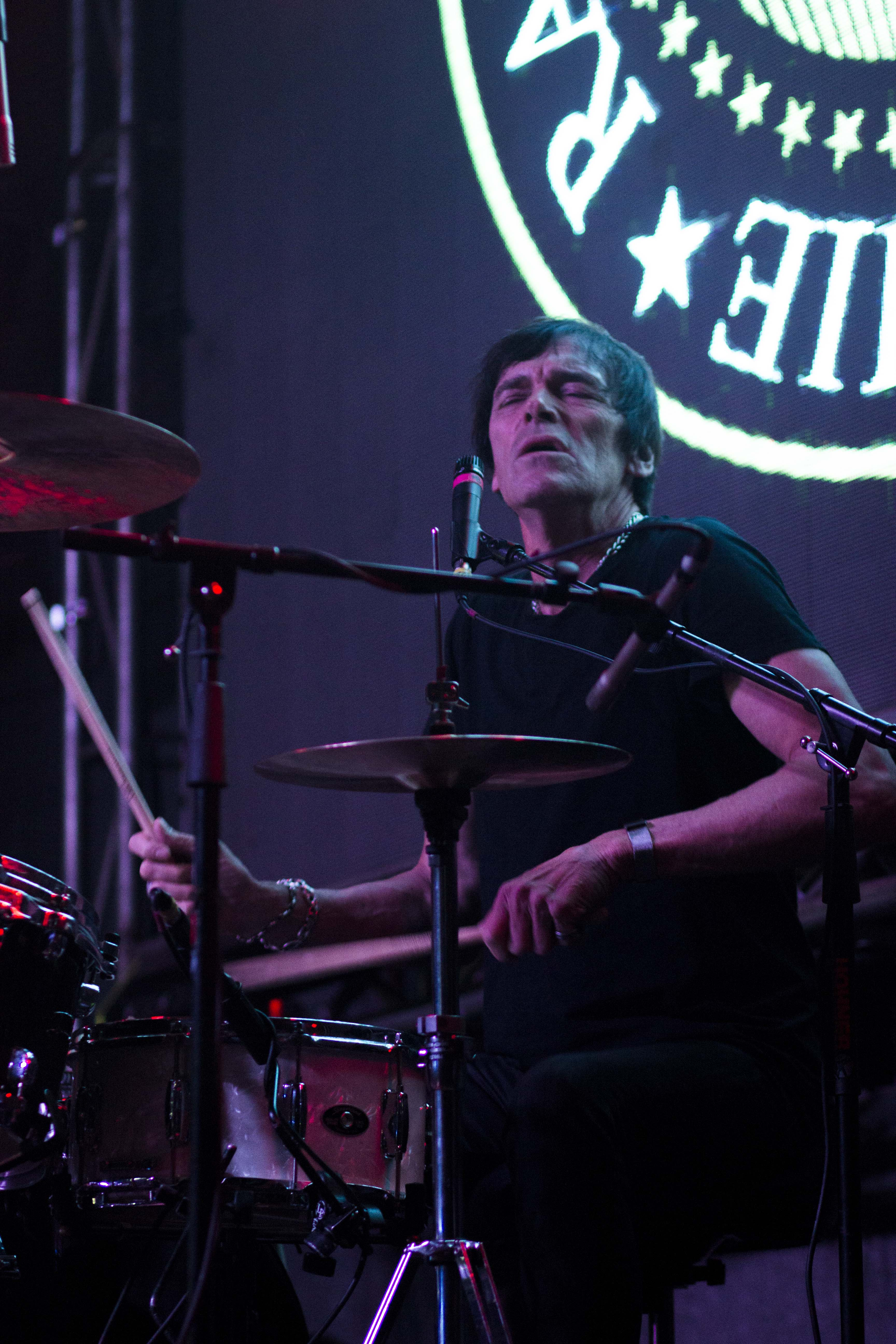
- Richie Ramone performing in 2018

Background information
- Born: Richard Reinhardt; August 11, 1956 (age 70); Passaic, New Jersey, U.S.
- Genre: Punk rock
- Occupation: Musician
- Instrument: Drums
- Years active: 1975–present
- Formerly of: Ramones; Shirts; Velveteen; Remod
- Website: richieramone.com

Signature
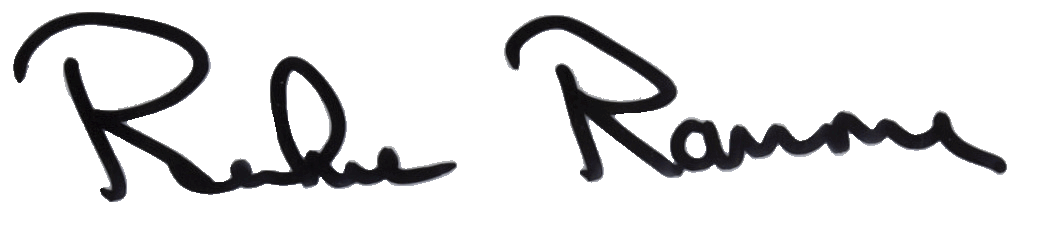

Richard Reinhardt (born August 11, 1956) is an American drummer best known by his stage name Richie Ramone, and for being the drummer for the punk band the Ramones from February 1983 until August 1987. As of 2026, he is one of three surviving members of the band, the others being Marky Ramone and C.J. Ramone. Richie appeared on three studio albums with the Ramones and played on Joey Ramone's second solo album ...Ya Know? He has later released three solo albums and currently fronts his own solo band.

== Early life ==
Reinhardt was born into a middle-class family in Passaic, New Jersey, on August 11, 1956. Reinhardt is the third child of homemaker Mary Ann (née Kublaek) and landscaper Leonard Reinhardt. His mother was originally from Wisconsin and was of Slavic descent. His father was the son of Dutch immigrants from Den Bommel, a village in South Holland. Reinhardt grew up Catholic and described his family as "hardcore" Republicans.

Reinhardt's first experience with music was singing hymns in the church choir. Though, Reinhardt's first experience playing drums would not occur until he was eight, due to his parents wanting each of their children to play a musical instrument. Reinhardt would occasionally play drums in his brothers band The Exceptions.

Reinhardt would not join his first band until 1972, where he had played in Tapestry. Reinhardt would later leave the band in 1974 and start playing in Windfall, which was an eight-piece horn band. Reinhardt would use the pseudonym Richie Rainbow during this time. He would later change it to Beau following the formation of Ritchie Blackmore's band, Rainbow.

In 1976, Reinhardt would leave Windfall. During this time, Reinhardt would answer a classified ad in the Aquarian for the funk band Madison. Reinhardt would subsequently leave New Jersey and take up a residency in Cocoa Beach, Florida. The band would additionally play tours in Canada.

== Career ==
=== Ramones ===
Prior to joining the Ramones, Reinhardt played drums for Velveteen and the Shirts. He joined the Ramones in February 1983 before the release of Subterranean Jungle, and appeared in two music videos from that album, although he did not play on the record itself. In his first months with the group he broke the tradition of adopting the Ramones surname and instead performed under the stage name Richie Beau. However, by the time of his first recordings with the band he had switched to the name Richie Ramone. He played on the Ramones albums Too Tough to Die, Animal Boy and Halfway to Sanity and appears on their compilation albums Greatest Hits, Loud, Fast Ramones: Their Toughest Hits and Weird Tales of the Ramones, and on the Ramones live video album It's Alive 1974–1996. He wrote the Ramones' hit song "Somebody Put Something in My Drink" off the Animal Boy album and later included on the compilation album Ramones Mania, the first Ramones album to go gold. Richie also wrote the songs "Smash You", "Humankind", "I'm Not Jesus", "I Know Better Now" and "(You) Can't Say Anything Nice". Richie's songs "I'm Not Jesus" and "Somebody Put Something in my Drink" have later been covered by new generations of bands worldwide, notably by metal bands Children of Bodom and Behemoth.

Richie was the only drummer to sing lead vocals on a Ramones song, including "(You) Can't Say Anything Nice" and the unreleased 1985 demo "Elevator Operator" written by Joey Ramone, which also featured Joey's brother Mickey Leigh on guitar and Dave U. Hall on bass, both from The Rattlers, as well a multitude of Ramones demos. Joey said of Richie: "Richie's very talented and he's very diverse . . . He really strengthened the band a hundred percent because he sings backing tracks, he sings lead, and he sings with Dee Dee's stuff. In the past, it was always just me singing for the most part." Richie performed over 500 shows with the Ramones all over the world, including South America, where rabid fans held up signs proclaiming "Richie" and "Drink", the latter referring to the song "Somebody Put Something in My Drink," written by Richie.

The relationship of the Ramones members was often rocky, as documented in 22-year tour manager Monte Melnick's book, On the Road with the Ramones, and Mickey Leigh's book, I Slept with Joey Ramone. In the documentary End of the Century: The Story of the Ramones, Richie reveals that he had artistic differences with Johnny Ramone that escalated in the recording studio while Richie was re-mixing Halfway to Sanity at the late night request of Joey Ramone to fix the album. Johnny would also refuse to credit Richie for the mixing on the album and did not allow him to write more than one or two songs per album. However, Richie enjoyed close bonds with songwriter/bassist Dee Dee Ramone and Joey Ramone who stated, "[Richie] saved the band as far as I'm concerned. He's the greatest thing to happen to the Ramones. He put the spirit back in the band."

=== Leaving the Ramones ===
Richie left the band abruptly in August 1987 after financial conflicts with Johnny Ramone. Richie stated in an interview that he had asked for a small percentage of the merchandise income based on his tenure with the band and their use of his name and image, which he claimed Joey and Dee Dee were in favor of, but Johnny refused. Richie added that he never felt entitled to a large share as he was not a founding member and mentioned feeling left out when the other members would go to cash their merchandise checks while on tour. After leaving the Ramones, Richie remained friends with Dee Dee and worked on some of his solo recordings. He was briefly replaced by Clem Burke of Blondie and The Romantics, before the latter was replaced by Richie's predecessor Marky Ramone. After Joey's passing in 2001, the only Ramones to attend his funeral were Richie, Tommy and C. J. Richie would later express sadness over not being able to reconnect with Joey before his death given their close friendship while in the band.

In September 2007, Richie filed a federal lawsuit titled Reinhardt v. Wal-mart Stores, Inc. et al. in the Southern District of New York. He alleged that the copyright on the six tunes he wrote for the Ramones had been infringed when the band's management licensed the band's recordings for sale as digital downloads. The defendants were Wal-mart Stores, Inc., Apple, Inc., RealNetworks, Inc., Taco Tunes, Inc., Ramones Productions, Inc., Estate of John Cummings, Herzog & Strauss, and Ira Herzog (i.e., he was suing the band, its managers, its publishing company, and three leading sellers of digital downloads.) Judge Shira Scheindlin dismissed the case in May 2008, on the grounds that no copyright infringement had occurred, but acknowledged that there might be other unsettled issues between Richie Ramone and his former band. These issues were subsequently resolved and resulted in Richie Ramone obtaining full writing and publishing rights to the songs.

=== Other work and solo career ===
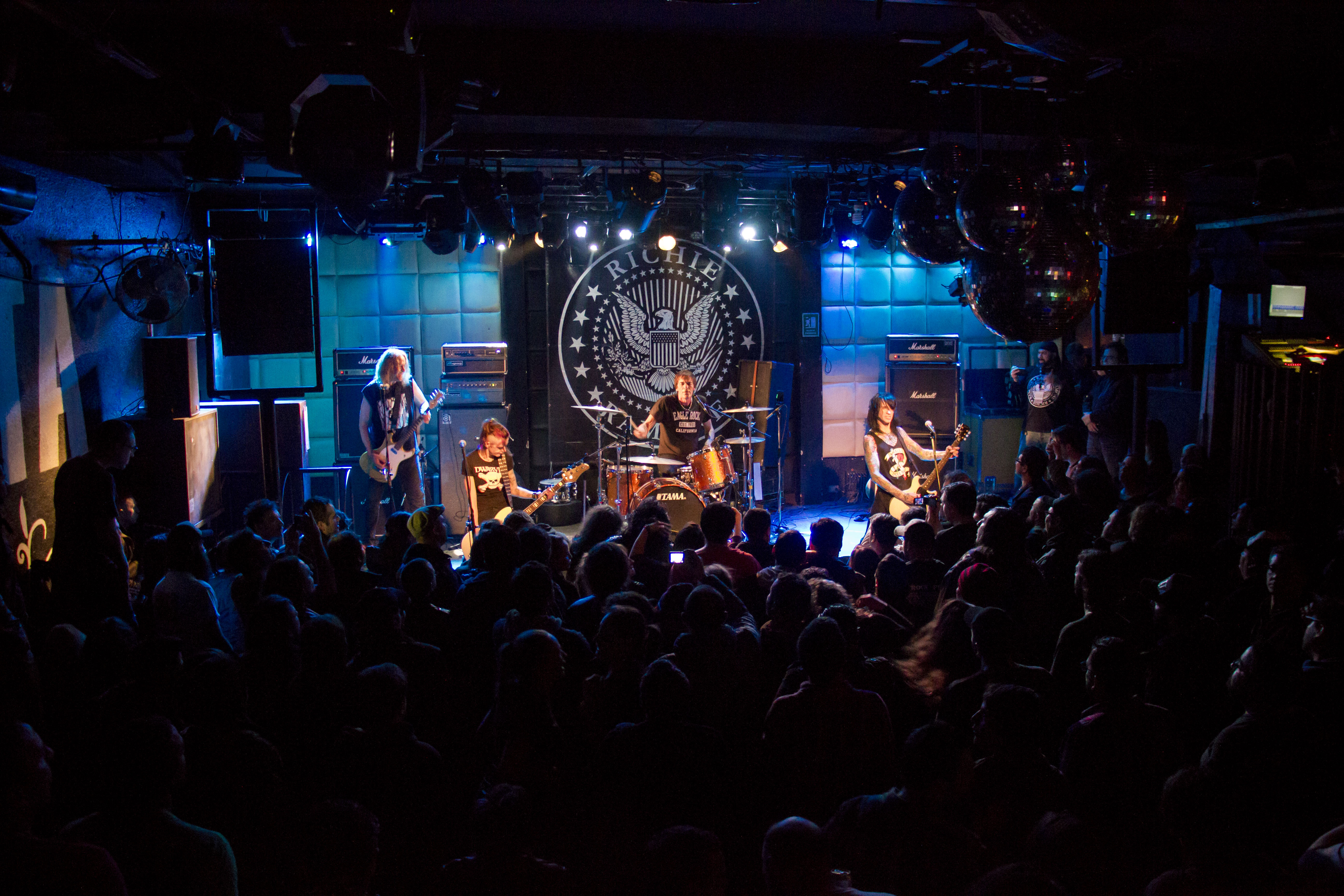
Richie Ramone performing with his solo band in 2017. From left to right: Ben Reagan, Clare Misstake, Richie Ramone and Ronnie Simmons.

In August 2007, Richie debuted a classical composition entitled "Suite for Drums and Orchestra" (based on themes from West Side Story) with the Pasadena Pops. Richie Ramone was both the featured soloist and the concerto's co-composer, a feat no other punk rock drummer had done before. The work was commissioned by Pops music director Rachael Worby and was met with acclaim by critics who noted that Richie "brought the audience to its feet after his faster-than-the-human-eye-can-follow drumming". Richie regularly plays at the annual "Joey Ramone Birthday Bash" with Joey's brother Mickey Leigh, including songs with Tommy Ramone before his passing in 2014. In 2011, the Ramones were awarded a Grammy Lifetime Achievement Award. Leigh invited Richie to give a short speech at the awards ceremony where Richie noted that it was the first time in history that all three Ramones drummers were gathered and mused that Joey would be proud of the Achievement Award. Richie would later be the only surviving Ramone to feature on the long-anticipated second Joey Ramone solo album ...Ya Know?, released in 2012.

In 2013, Richie Ramone signed with DC-Jam Records and released his first solo album, Entitled, on October 8, 2013. Billboard debuted the LP's first single, "Criminal" and noted, "Back to holding the songwriting reins, Ramone's 12 freshest cuts aim to please fans of both rock and metal with its blend of barre chord-chugging simplicity and guitar hero virtuosity." Richie released his second solo album, Cellophane, in 2016. In 2018, Richie's autobiography, I Know Better Now: My Life Before, During and After the Ramones, was published by Backbeat Books. The book was written in collaboration with Peter Aaron. Richie's third studio album, Live to Tell, was released in 2023. He continues to tour with his solo band and occasionally plays with former Ramones bassist C. J. Ramone.

== Discography ==
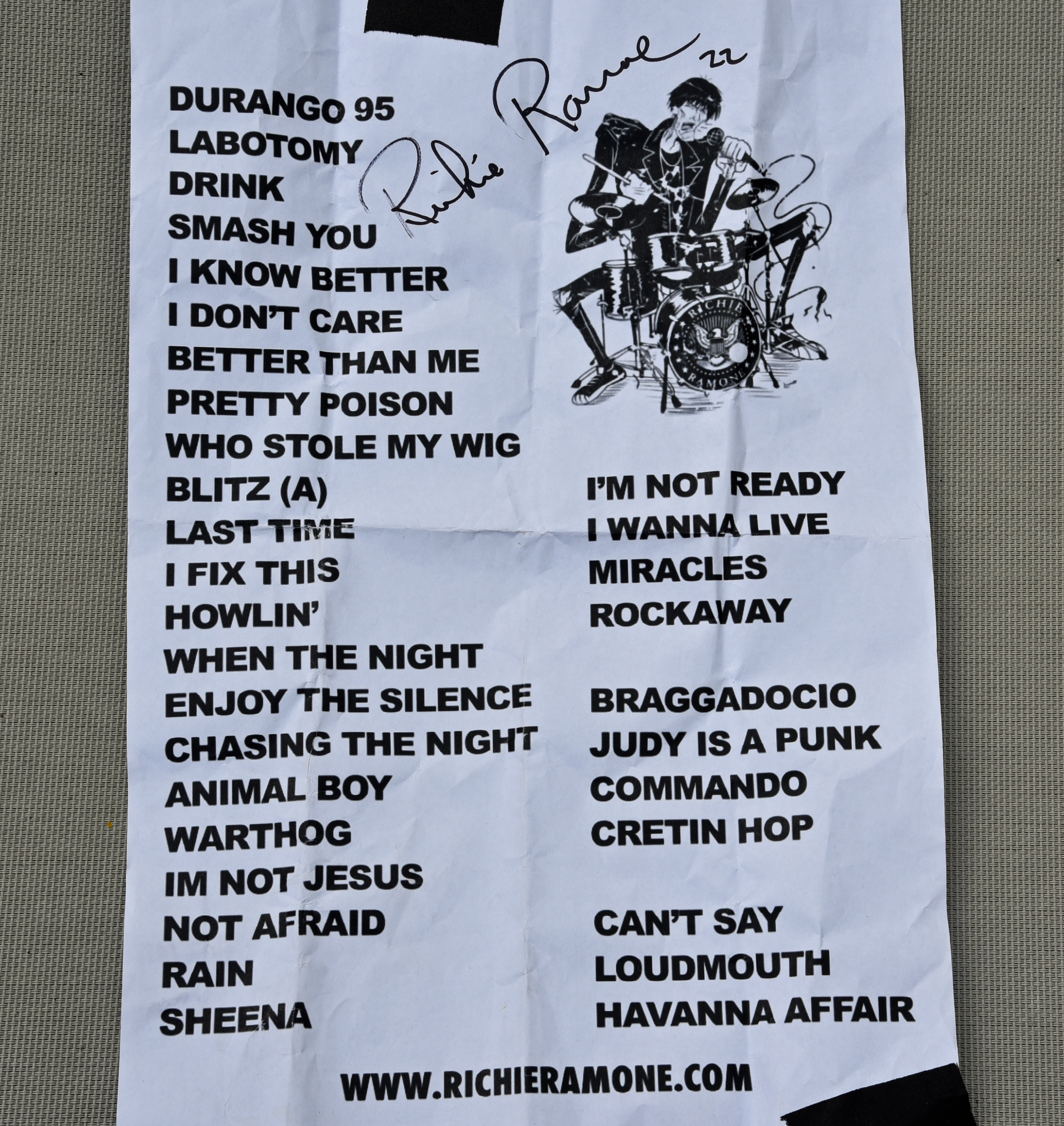
Concert setlist

=== With the Ramones ===
- Too Tough to Die (1984)
- Animal Boy (1986)
- Halfway to Sanity (1987)
- Smash You: Live '85 (2002)
  - Live disc recorded in 1985 and released as the second disc on initial copies of Loud, Fast Ramones: Their Toughest Hits

=== With the Rock n Roll Rats ===
- Rebel 67 (2013)

=== With the Gobshites ===
- The Whistle Before the Snap (2013)
- Live from the Dogghouse (2013)

=== Solo ===
- Entitled (2013)
- Cellophane (2016)
- Live to Tell (2023)

=== Guest appearances ===
- Velveteen – After Hours (1983) (as Richard Beau)
- Fred Schneider – Fred Schneider and the Shake Society (1984) (as Richard Beau)
- Joey Ramone – ...Ya Know? (2012)
- Ambulance – Planet You (2012)
- Dan Sartain – Love Is Suicide (2013)
- Bloody Mess Rock Circus – Mountain Rock (2013)
- The Anderson Stingrays – Summerville Beach (2015)
- Aaron Stingray and the Brooklyn Apostles – Songs in the Key of Joey (2018)

== Cited works ==
- Ramone, Richie; Aaron, Peter (2018). I Know Better Now: My Life Before, During and After the Ramones. Milwaukee, Wisconsin: Backbeat. ISBN 978-1617137105.
- Leigh, Mickey (2009). I Slept with Joey Ramone. New York City: Touchstone. ISBN 978-0-7432-5216-4.
- True, Everett (2005). Hey Ho Let's Go: The Story of the Ramones. Omnibus. ISBN 1-84449-413-6.
- Melnick, Monte (2007). On the Road with the Ramones. London: Bobcat. ISBN 978-1-84772-103-7.
- Bowe, Brian J. (2019). The Ramones. New York City: Enslow. ISBN 978-1-9785-0410-3.
