= Rock 'n' Roll High School =

1979 film directed by Allan Arkush

- Theatrical release poster by William Stout
- Directed by: Allan Arkush
- Screenplay by: Richard Whitley; Russ Dvonch; Joseph McBride
- Story by: Allan Arkush; Joe Dante
- Produced by: Michael Finnell
- Starring: P. J. Soles; Vince Van Patten; Clint Howard; Dey Young; Ramones
- Cinematography: Dean Cundey
- Edited by: Larry Bock; Gail Werbin
- Music by: Ed Stasium
- Distributed by: New World Pictures
- Release date: April 20, 1979
- Running time: 93 minutes
- Country: United States
- Language: English
- Budget: $200,000

Rock 'n' Roll High School is a 1979 American musical comedy film directed by Allan Arkush, produced by Michael Finnell, and starring P. J. Soles, Vince Van Patten, Clint Howard, and Dey Young. The film features punk rock group the Ramones.

== Plot ==
Vince Lombardi High School keeps losing principals to nervous breakdowns because of the students' love of rock and roll and their disregard for education. The leader of the students, Riff Randell, is the biggest Ramones fan at the school and also the worst behavioral problem, with a disciplinary record that fills an entire filing cabinet. She waits in line for three days to get tickets to see the band, hoping to meet Joey Ramone, so she can give him a song she wrote for them, "Rock 'n' Roll High School".

When the new tyrannical Principal Togar takes her ticket away, Riff and her best friend Kate Rambeau have to find another way to meet their heroes, winning a radio contest. Riff succeeds in delivering her song to Joey Ramone, but the next day, Principal Togar and a group of parents attempt to burn a pile of the kids' mostly Ramones rock records. In response, the students and music teacher Mr. McGree (who develops a change of heart for Rock and Roll throughout the film), joined by the Ramones (who have made Riff an honorary Ramone), overthrow the teachers and hall monitors Fritz Gretel and Fritz Hansel to take over the high school, with Principal Togar asking the musicians, "Do your parents know you're Ramones?" When the police are summoned and demand that the students evacuate the building, they do so, but then the students and the Ramones blow up the school as a final act of youthful rebellion, driving Principal Togar insane as radio host "Screamin'" Steve Stevens wraps up the film.

== Cast ==
- P. J. Soles as Riff Randell
- Vince Van Patten as Tom Roberts
- Clint Howard as Eaglebauer
- Dey Young as Kate Rambeau
- Mary Woronov as Principal Evelyn Togar
- Paul Bartel as Mr. McGree
- Dick Miller as Police Chief
- Don Steele as Screamin' Steve Stevens
- Alix Elias as Coach Steroid
- Daniel Davies as Fritz Gretel
- Loren Lester as Fritz Hansel
- Gillian Farrell as Angel Dust
- Herbie Braha as Sal
- Grady Sutton as School Board President
- Joey Ramone as Himself
- Johnny Ramone as Himself
- Dee Dee Ramone as Himself
- Marky Ramone as Himself
- Chris Somma as Shawn
- Marla Rosenfield as Cheryl
- Barbara Ann Walters as Cafeteria Lady
- Terry Soda as Norma
- Joe Van Sickle as Cop

== Production ==
Roger Corman was looking to make a modern teen film similar to the ones he made in his early career during the 1960s, but with the focus on current music of the time. The initial title Disco High was selected for a story idea from Allan Arkush and Joe Dante. A script was developed by Richard Whitley, Russ Dvonch, and Joseph McBride. During this time, the film went through several different title changes including Heavy Metal Kids and Girl's Gym. Arkush directed the majority of the film, but Dante also helped when Arkush was suffering from exhaustion.

Corman originally wanted Cheap Trick or Todd Rundgren to play the band, but due to schedule conflicts, he was forced to find an alternative. The Ramones were suggested by Paul Bartel, one of the actors in the film. During their visit to LA, the Ramones stayed at the Tropicana Motel, where they wrote songs for their next album, End of the Century. The genesis for the plot was a favorite story told to the film's original writer by his father, Raymond E. McBride of the Milwaukee Journal, who staged a walkout from his Superior (Wis.) Central High school in the 1920s.

The film was shot on the campus of the defunct Mount Carmel High School in South Central Los Angeles, which had been closed in 1976. The nighttime school explosions and fires were so great that many people were scared away and, temporarily, would not return to the on-campus sets. Extras were students from Mira Costa High School in Manhattan Beach, California. The opening sequence, the food fight scene, and the dance number “Do You Wanna Dance” featured the drill team and football team wearing their actual uniforms from MCHS.

== Release ==
The film had a sneak preview in Hollywood. It then had showings in Texas and New Mexico in April, 1979. It then went to San Francisco, then in July to Chicago, and opened in Manhattan on August 3 of that year, then continued on to further markets.

=== Home media ===
Rock 'n' Roll High School was originally released on VHS by Warner Home Video in 1983, and was later re-released on VHS in 1996 by New Horizons Home Video (OCLC 36127344). A year later, in 1997, it was issued on DVD by Lumivision. A second DVD release occurred in 1999 from Slingshot. Shortly after Joey Ramone's death in 2001, New Concorde produced a third DVD release. The film was once again issued on DVD in 2005 by Buena Vista Home Entertainment (ISBN 978-0-7888-6342-4 OCLC 62756806). DVDs in the PAL format were issued by Umbrella Entertainment in 2003 (OCLC 223658430) and again in 2007 (OCLC 368008921).

The film was a part of Shout! Factory's Roger Corman Cult Classics series, reissued on DVD in May 2010. Shout! Factory released the film with exclusive content on Blu-ray on May 11, 2010 and again on November 19, 2019, with a new 4K restoration.

== Soundtrack ==
Professional ratings
Review scores
Source	Rating
Christgau's Record Guide	B

A soundtrack album on Sire/Warner Bros. Records was released around the same time, but it included only a limited number of songs from the film. The two main Ramones songs (the title song and "I Want You Around") were recorded by Ed Stasium but remixed by Phil Spector for the soundtrack album. The original Ed Stasium mixes were not issued until the compilation album Ramones Mania (1988) and the compilation album Hey! Ho! Let's Go: The Anthology (1999), respectively.

Side One
No.	Title	Writer(s)	Performer(s)	Length
1.	"Rock 'n' Roll High School" (Phil Spector remix)	Ramones	Ramones	2:20
2.	"I Want You Around" (Phil Spector remix)	Ramones	Ramones	3:04
3.	"Come On Let's Go" (Cover of Ritchie Valens, 1959)	Ritchie Valens	The Paley Brothers and Ramones	2:14
4.	"Ramones Medley: Blitzkrieg Bop / Teenage Lobotomy / California Sun / Pinhead / She's the One" (recorded live at The Roxy, Los Angeles)	Ramones, Henry Glover, Morris Levy	Ramones	11:04
5.	"So It Goes" (from Pure Pop for Now People, 1978)	Lowe	Nick Lowe	2:31
6.	"Energy Fools the Magician" (from Before and After Science, 1977)	Eno	Brian Eno	2:05

Side Two
No.	Title	Writer(s)	Performer(s)	Length
1.	"Rock 'n' Roll High School"	Ramones	P. J. Soles	2:12
2.	"Come Back Jonee" (from Q: Are We Not Men? A: We Are Devo!, 1978)	Gerald V. Casale, Mark Mothersbaugh	Devo	3:47
3.	"Teenage Depression" (from Teenage Depression, 1976)	Dave Higgs	Eddie and the Hot Rods	2:57
4.	"Smokin' In the Boys Room" (from Yeah!, 1973)	Cub Koda, Michael Lutz	Brownsville Station	2:57
5.	"School Days" (single, 1957)	Berry	Chuck Berry	2:44
6.	"A Dream Goes on Forever" (from Todd, 1974)	Rundgren	Todd Rundgren	2:24
7.	"School's Out" (from School's Out, 1972)	Alice Cooper, Glen Buxton, Michael Bruce, Dennis Dunaway, Neal Smith	Alice Cooper	3:26

Other songs appearing in the film include:

- Bent Fabric – "Alley Cat"
- Brian Eno – "Spirits Drifting"
- Brian Eno – "Alternative 3"
- Brian Eno – "M386"
- Fleetwood Mac – "Albatross"
- Fleetwood Mac – "Jigsaw Puzzle Blues"
- Paul McCartney – "Did We Meet Somewhere Before?"
- MC5 – "High School"
- The Paley Brothers – "You're the Best"
- The Velvet Underground – "Rock & Roll"
- Huey Lewis and the News - "Who Cares"

As well as the following songs by the Ramones:

- "Blitzkrieg Bop"
- "Do You Wanna Dance?"
- "I Just Want to Have Something to Do"
- "I Wanna Be Sedated"
- "I Wanna Be Your Boyfriend"
- "Questioningly"
- "Sheena Is a Punk Rocker"

== Reception ==
Rock 'n' Roll High School received generally positive reviews. On the review aggregator website Rotten Tomatoes, 83% of 29 critics' reviews are positive, with an average rating of 7/10. On Metacritic, the film has a weighted average score of 70 out of 100, based on 7 critics, indicating "generally favorable reviews". The Globe and Mail wrote that "the plot owes something to Animal House (but Rock 'n' Roll High School is funnier) and something to Beach Blanket Bingo and something to many other movies too numerous to mention; it is not, how you say, original." The Boston Globe opined: "It has the look of Grease and the soul of Animal House—and it's better than both. The anarchic rock of The Ramones electrifies the film with a driving beat that never lets up. The film, like rock and roll, is just plain fun." Zack Handlen of The A.V. Club wrote: "Underneath its chipper, anything-for-laugh grin, Rock ‘N’ Roll is as subversive as teen movies get, with an ending that, for all its absurdity, is still surprisingly shocking."

== Sequel ==
In 1991 a sequel called Rock 'n' Roll High School Forever was released. The sequel starred Corey Feldman. Mary Woronov, who played Principal Togar in the original film, appeared in the sequel as Vice Principal Doctor Vadar. The movie was met with poor reviews but over the years it has gained a cult following.

== Proposed remake ==
In July 2008, actor/writer Alex Winter was hired to script a remake of the film for Howard Stern's production company.

== In other media ==
Corman's short-lived comic book publishing imprint, Roger Corman's Cosmic Comics, released a two-issue take on the film in 1995, written by Bob Fingerman with art by Shane Oakley and Jason Lutes. Unable to acquire likeness licenses for the Ramones, the comic instead featured the Melvins.

== See also ==
- List of cult films
