= I Wanna Be Sedated =

- Netherlands picture sleeve

Single by Ramones

from the album Road to Ruin
- A-side: "She's the One"
- Released: September 21, 1978
- Recorded: 1978
- Genre: Punk rock; pop-punk
- Length: 2:29
- Label: Sire
- Songwriters: Dee Dee Ramone; Joey Ramone; Johnny Ramone
- Producers: Tommy Ramone; Ed Stasium

Ramones singles chronology
"Do You Remember Rock 'n' Roll Radio?" (1980)	"I Wanna Be Sedated" (1978)	"The KKK Took My Baby Away" (1981)

Music video
- "I Wanna Be Sedated" on YouTube

"I Wanna Be Sedated" is a song by American punk rock band Ramones, originally released on the band's fourth studio album, Road to Ruin (1978), in September 1978 and as the B-side of the UK single "She's the One" released on September 21, 1978. The song was later released as a single in the Netherlands in 1979, and in the U.S. in 1980 by RSO Records from the Times Square soundtrack album. It has since remained one of the band's best known songs.

== History ==
"I Wanna Be Sedated" was written by Joey Ramone. In an interview about the song, Joey explains the chorus:

It's a road song. I wrote it in 1977, through to 78'. Well, Danny Fields was our first manager and he would work us to death. We would be on the road 360 days a year, and we went over to England, and we were there at Christmas time, and in Christmas time, London shuts down. There's nothing to do, nowhere to go. Here we were in London for the first time in our lives, and me and Dee Dee Ramone were sharing a room in the hotel, and we were watching The Guns of Navarone. So there was nothing to do, I mean, here we are in London finally, and this is what we are doing, watching American movies in the hotel room.

In an interview with Loudwire in 2015, Marky Ramone claimed Joey wrote the song inspired by the time he was in a hospital while being treated for burns on his face and his throat:

He got burnt by an humidifier, an inhaler, to clear his nostrils and his breathing passages. It exploded. So that's where 'Sedated' came from. [...] That must've hurt. Because you see pictures afterwards, and you can see his skin's melted away.

== Music video ==
The music video for the song, directed by Bill Fishman, was released in September 1988, about ten years after the song was originally released, to promote the compilation album Ramones Mania. The iconic video features the Ramones sitting at a table (left to right: Johnny, Joey, Marky and Dee Dee), nonchalantly reading and eating generic corn flakes (branded "Corn Flakes") while the background hallway erupts into a venue for nuns, acrobats, ballerinas, superheroes, monsters, cheerleaders, clowns, doctors, fetish nurses, and smoking schoolgirls. The film is intentionally sped up to show the excitement of the background, while the band's actions are in regular motion. This was achieved by having the band members move very slowly, while the crowd moved normally, and then speeding up the film. One of the video's characters, the bride, is played by a young Courtney Love. Olivia Barash and Dorothy Lyman also appear in the music video.

A still from the video was featured in the liner notes of the band's 1989 album Brain Drain, though the song itself does not appear on that album.

== Reception ==
"I Wanna Be Sedated" was number 145 on the Rolling Stone's 500 Greatest Songs of All Time. Marky Ramone is the drummer on this track.

In 1999, National Public Radio included the song in the "NPR 100", in which NPR's music editors sought to compile the one hundred most important American musical works of the 20th century.

Kelefa Sanneh said of the song, "I loved it because it seemed like the beginning of a tradition, pointing away from all the conventional thing a rock 'n' roll band might do, and pointing toward anything and everything else."

According to Alice Cooper, Joey Ramone acknowledged the similarity to Cooper's earlier 1972 song "Elected", explaining that the Ramones listened to a lot of Alice Cooper.

== In popular culture ==
A shortened version of "I Wanna Be Sedated", arranged for strings by Benjamin Wallfisch and performed by Mirel Wagner, appears as the last track on the soundtrack album for the 2016 film A Cure for Wellness, composed by Wallfisch. This was featured in the film's first trailer released in October 2016, but doesn't actually appear in the film itself.

The song was featured in the official teaser trailer of the 2019 film Spider-Man: Far From Home, after Ramones song "Blitzkrieg Bop" was prominently featured in the film's 2017 predecessor Spider-Man: Homecoming.

The song was featured in the penultimate episode of The Magicians, which aired on 25 March, 2020, sung by most of the cast during a heist operation in a musical episode.

At 12:00 am on December 31, 2020, an internet meme began trending on social media that said it was "2020, 24 hours to go". This was a reference to the song's opening lyric, "twenty, twenty, twenty-four hours to go".

== Certifications ==
Certifications for "I Wanna Be Sedated"
Region	Certification	Certified units/sales
New Zealand (RMNZ)	Gold	15,000^{‡}
United States (RIAA)	Platinum	1,000,000^{‡}
^{‡} Sales+streaming figures based on certification alone.
