= Rock 'n' Roll High School (song) =

Single by the Ramones

from the album Rock 'n' Roll High School and End of the Century
- B-side: "Do You Wanna Dance?"
- Released: June 1, 1979
- Recorded: November 1978
- Studio: Cherokee Studios, Los Angeles, California
- Genre: Punk rock, rock and roll
- Length: 2:20 (Rock 'n' Roll High School & single version); 2:38 (End of the Century version)
- Label: Sire
- Songwriters: Joey Ramone, Dee Dee Ramone
- Producers: Version 1 - Ed Stasium Version 2 - Ed Stasium, Phil Spector Version 3 - Phil Spector

The Ramones singles chronology
"Needles and Pins" (1979)	"Rock 'n' Roll High School" (1979)	"Baby, I Love You" (1980)

Music video
- "Rock 'n' Roll High School" on YouTube

"Rock 'n' Roll High School" is a song by American punk rock band Ramones, from the soundtrack album Rock 'n' Roll High School. The single did not chart in the U.S. but peaked at number 67 on the UK Singles Chart and was top ten in Belgium and the Netherlands,

There are three versions of the song. The first was recorded in early 1979 by Ed Stasium and was intended for the Rock 'n' Roll High School soundtrack. This version opens with an extended drum beat first, with Joey eventually singing the opening line, "rock, rock, rock, rock, rock 'n' roll high school". This is also the version they usually performed live. This version was not issued until the 1988 compilation album Ramones Mania.

The second version is a slight remix of the Ed Stasium version by producer Phil Spector, who produced the Ramones' next album End of the Century. This version features Spector's Wall of Sound mixing technique and was the version featured on the Rock 'n' Roll High School soundtrack album and accompanying 7" single.

The third version is a complete re-recording by Phil Spector for the End of the Century album. This version opens with a long, sustained guitar chord and has a slightly different arrangement. This version was featured in the music video for the song.

In the music video, drummer Marky Ramone, dressed in drag, plays the role of the female teacher. Three of the band members' girlfriends/wives can also be seen; Dee Dee's first wife Vera Boldis, Johnny's then-girlfriend Roxy and Joey's then-girlfriend (who later married bandmate Johnny) Linda Ramone. The only time the Spector-produced version was played was on The Sha Na Na Show, where the band mimed the song.

The Ramones performed the song on The Old Grey Whistle Test in 1980.

== Charts ==
=== Weekly charts ===
Chart (1979–1980)	Peak position
Australia (Kent Music Report)	41
Belgium (Ultratop 50 Flanders)	7
Netherlands (Dutch Top 40)	8
Netherlands (Mega Top 30)	5
Netherlands (Single Top 100)	5
UK Singles (Official Charts)	67

=== Year-end charts ===
Chart (1980)	Position
Belgium (Ultratop Flanders)	59
Netherlands (Dutch Top 40)	68
Netherlands (Single Top 100)	32
