= Road to Ruin (Ramones album) =

Studio album by the Ramones
- Released: September 22, 1978
- Recorded: May–July 1978
- Studios: Mediasound, New York City
- Genres: Punk rock; pop punk; hard rock; rock and roll
- Length: 31:02
- Label: Sire
- Producers: T. Erdelyi; Ed Stasium

Ramones chronology
Rocket to Russia (1977)	Road to Ruin (1978)	End of the Century (1980)

Singles from Road to Ruin
- 1. "Don't Come Close" Released: 1978; 2. "Needles and Pins" Released: 1978; 3. "I Wanna Be Sedated" Released: September 21, 1978; 4. "She's the One" Released: 1979 (UK)

Road to Ruin is the fourth studio album by the American punk rock band Ramones, released on September 22, 1978, through Sire Records as LP record, 8 track cartridge & audio cassette. It was the first Ramones album to feature new drummer Marky Ramone, who replaced Tommy Ramone. Tommy left the band due to low sales of previous albums as well as stress he experienced while touring; however, he stayed with the band to produce the album (credited as T. Erdelyi) with Ed Stasium. The artwork's concept was designed by Ramones fan Gus MacDonald and later modified by John Holmstrom to include Marky instead of Tommy.

The album incorporated musical elements that were less prominent in punk rock, such as heavy metal-influenced guitar solos and 1960s-style ballads. The songs on Road to Ruin are considered by some as an attempt to get the band more airplay. The album did not sell as well as the band had hoped, peaking at number 103 on the Billboard 200, more than 50 places behind its predecessor, Rocket to Russia. However, Road to Ruin lives on decades later as a fan favorite. "I Wanna Be Sedated", which had a successful music video produced almost a decade after its release, has since become one of the band's most well-known tracks, as well as their second most-streamed track on Spotify after "Blitzkrieg Bop". The album has had multiple re-releases with new work from producer Ed Stasium.

== Conception ==
After the band's previous album Rocket to Russia saw poor album sales, drummer Tommy Ramone left his performing position to focus primarily on producing for the band. After Tommy suggested they search for a new drummer, they began looking in New York City based clubs. While at CBGBs, Ramones bassist Dee Dee Ramone approached Marc Bell (Marky Ramone) – who was his friend and had previously been the drummer in Richard Hell and the Voidoids – asking him if he was interested in joining the Ramones. A month after this encounter, manager Danny Fields formally asked Marky to audition for the band. Around twenty others auditioned to be the drummer, though Johnny, Joey and Dee Dee wanted to hire Marky after his performances of "I Don't Care" and "Sheena Is a Punk Rocker". Marky stayed close to Tommy's straightforward technique, with a bit more technical sophistication.

Three weeks after Marky joined the band, the Ramones began recording Road to Ruin in Midtown Manhattan at Mediasound Studios, the premises of a former Episcopalian Church. Album engineer Ed Stasium explained the recording process: "After Tommy left the band, we went straight into working on the Road to Ruin album with Marky Ramone. We rehearsed with Marky, just getting it down. Then we went into the studio, recorded, and mixed the record at Media Sound. We spent a lot of money, and the entire summer, on Road to Ruin." Music critic Charles Young of Rolling Stone called the album's production "clean and simple", but pointed out that the track "Bad Brain" contained "funny noises" suggested by the producers in between drum beats, which prevents the song from having the humorous asperity that was intended.

The artwork's concept was originated by Ramones fan Gus MacDonald, who illustrated the members performing with a lobster claw coming out of an amplifier and a snake around their feet. Following the drawing's completion, MacDonald sent it to the band and they decided to make it their Road to Ruin album cover. This sketch did, however, include original drummer Tommy, so the drawing had to be modified to depict Marky instead. This alteration was undertaken by artist John Holmstrom, a Punk magazine associate and designer.

== Lyrics and composition ==
The album introduced some characteristics that were new to Ramones records, such as guitar solos, acoustic rhythm guitars, and ballads. These attributes were debated by the band's fans as well as critics, who questioned whether these changes sought to expand their musical fashion or the band was simply selling out and abandoning their punk-rock edge. Though "Bad Brain", "I Wanted Everything", and "I'm Against It" each serves as basic punk songs to intensify the behavior of the audience, the most popular tracks on the album are the pieces which part from their initial style. "Bad Brain" would inspire the name of the pioneering hardcore band.

Tommy Ramone said of the album's content:

"I Wanna Be Sedated"
"I Wanna Be Sedated" was described by the author Brian J. Bowe as one of the band's "most classic" pieces of music. After a show in London, Joey told manager Linda Stein: "Put me in a wheelchair and get me on a plane before I go insane." This quote would be the chorus to "I Wanna Be Sedated", whose lyrics invoke the stress which the band was under during touring. It is the most downloaded song from the catalog by The Ramones.

Road to Ruin reflected not just the Ramones' enduring love for the sixties pop, but a nagging desire to expand beyond the confines of 120 seconds in search of a new vocabulary of harmonic hooks, albeit linked to the guitar-crunching sonics established on their first three albums.

The album opens with the midtempo piece "I Just Want to Have Something to Do", which contains lyrics pertaining to ambivalence and anomie. The next track, "I Wanted Everything", is compared to Merle Haggard's song "If We Make It Through December", being called its "punk counterpart" by Rock: A Canadian Perspective author Larry Starr. "Questioningly" is a ballad focusing on failing relationships and heartbreak. "Don't Come Close" uses elements that can also be heard in country music, such as twang.

"She's the One" suggests that the band will continue making records, while "Needles and Pins" is a cover. Rolling Stone critic Charles Young noted that the song could have easily been a joke, but was not since Joey "really puts his guts into these antiquated but beautiful lyrics and pulls it off." "I Wanna Be Sedated" was written by Joey while in the hospital where he was treated for burns on his face and in his throat. The injury was the result of an exploding kettle full of boiling water which served to treat sinuses. The album concludes with "It's a Long Way Back", which was written by Dee Dee and depicts his childhood in Germany.

== Release ==
With the band's slight change in musical style, material included on the album was intended to gain a sense of mainstream acceptance, though the band members felt that this was not achieved. Tommy relates: "Road to Ruin was a flop Stateside, even though it had been a very deliberate attempt to secure American radioplay." The album's lack of commercial success showed for a negative impact on the members' morale, and this exasperation would continue into the band's future records and tours. On the US Billboard 200, Road to Ruin peaked at number 103, while on the UK Albums Chart it reached 32. The album also debuted at 25 on the Swedish Sverigetopplistan chart. The drive to sell more albums in the United States failed, which is evident when comparing the charting positions to Road to Ruin's predecessor Rocket to Russia, which peaked at 49 on the Billboard 200.

== Reception ==
Professional ratings
Review scores
Source	Rating
AllMusic	4.5/5 stars
The Austin Chronicle	4/5 stars
Blender	5/5 stars
NME	10/10
Q	4/5 stars
The Rolling Stone Album Guide	3.5/5 stars
Sounds	3/5 stars
Spin Alternative Record Guide	9/10
Uncut	8/10
The Village Voice	A

Initially, Road to Ruin received mixed reviews from critics. Roy Trakin of the New York Rocker called the album "uneven" and "sometimes lazy", and preferred Tommy's drumming style over Marky's, writing: "...his light, distinctive, jazz-influenced drumming is sorely missed on Road to Ruin as Marky is of the heads-down basher school." Jon Savage of Sounds felt that the Ramones' music had become formulaic and accused the band of "calculated negativity". Rolling Stone critic Charles M. Young found the album to be neither as humorous nor as innovative as the Ramones' debut, but noted that the band was not at all "losing its grip". He observed that the band had modified their style because "dumb" people did not understand the music, while "smart" people did. Young cited "I Wanna Be Sedated" as the album's "killer cut", comparing it to "Blitzkrieg Bop", "Loudmouth", and "Cretin Hop". In a highly positive review, The Village Voice's Robert Christgau wrote that the band was constantly "topping itself", and implied that each track on the album was very listenable except "Bad Brain", the theme of which he called "repetitious".

Cash Box said of "Don't Come Close" that "the production values emphasize clear guitar lines" and "Joey's lead vocals are effective and reminiscent of early British rockers." Record World called it "a fine pop outing" and said that "The vocals are familiar but the mid-'60s English rock beat and instrumentation have a smoother and finer edge."

Critical acclaim for Road to Ruin did not fully transpire until decades after its release. AllMusic senior editor Stephen Thomas Erlewine found that the album does not reach the quality of the Ramones' previous albums, taking issue with its "undistinguished" songs, but the music nonetheless "sounds good" despite lacking in "exuberant energy or abundant hooks". In a later retrospective review for AllMusic, Tim Sendra was more enthusiastic, writing that the more elaborate arrangements "worked well with the more diverse songs the band brought to the album".

The album is popular among the band's work today, often considered a fan favorite. In 2014 the album was voted their third best in a Rolling Stone top 10 article.

The hardcore punk band Bad Brains took their name from the song "Bad Brain". The title of Supergrass' 2005 album Road to Rouen is a reference to Road to Ruin.

== Track listing ==
All tracks originally credited to the Ramones (except "Needles and Pins"). Actual writers are listed alongside the tracks where applicable.

Side one
No.	Title	Writer(s)	Length
1.	"I Just Want to Have Something to Do"	Joey Ramone	2:42
2.	"I Wanted Everything"	Dee Dee Ramone	3:18
3.	"Don't Come Close"	Dee Dee Ramone	2:44
4.	"I Don't Want You"		2:26
5.	"Needles and Pins"	Sonny Bono, Jack Nitzsche	2:21
6.	"I'm Against It"		2:07

Side two
No.	Title	Writer(s)	Length
7.	"I Wanna Be Sedated"	Joey Ramone	2:29
8.	"Go Mental"		2:42
9.	"Questioningly"	Dee Dee Ramone	3:22
10.	"She's the One"		2:13
11.	"Bad Brain"		2:25
12.	"It's a Long Way Back"	Dee Dee Ramone	2:20
Total length:			31:02

2001 expanded edition CD (Warner Archives/Rhino) bonus tracks
No.	Title	Writer(s)	Length
13.	"I Want You Around" (Ed Stasium version)		3:02
14.	"Rock 'n' Roll High School" (Ed Stasium version)	Joey Ramone	2:20
15.	"Blitzkrieg Bop"/"Teenage Lobotomy"/"California Sun"/"Pinhead"/"She's the One" (Live)	Ramones, Henry Glover, Morris Levy	11:00
16.	"Come Back, She Cried aka I Walk Out" (demo)		2:21
17.	"Yea, Yea" (demo)	Joey Ramone	2:08
Total length:			52:01

Notes

- Tracks 13–14 first issued on Hey Ho! Let's Go: The Anthology, Rhino #75817 (7/20/99).
- Track 15 is from the original soundtrack album Rock 'n' Roll High School, Sire #6070 (4/79). Produced and engineered by Ed Stasium. Remix engineer: Joel Soifer.
- Track 16 is previously unreleased. Outtake from Road to Ruin sessions.
- Track 17 was first issued on All the Stuff (And More!) Volume 2, Sire #26618 (7/91). Produced by Tommy Erdelyi, recorded during demo sessions for Pleasant Dreams.

=== 2018 40th anniversary deluxe edition (Sire/Rhino) ===
Disc 1

Original album

- Features both the remastered original mixes (tracks 1–12) and the 40th anniversary Road revisited mix (tracks 13–24). Track listings as per original album.
- Tracks 13–24 mixed by Ed Stasium at Eight Palms Ranchero, Poway, California, 2018.

Disc 2

Rough mixes and 40th anniversary extras
No.	Title	Writer(s)	Length
1.	"I Walk Out" (2018 mix)		2:26
2.	"S.L.U.G." (2018 mix)	Joey Ramone	2:22
3.	"Don't Come Close" (single mix)	Dee Dee Ramone	2:44
4.	"Needles and Pins" (single mix)	Bono, Nitzsche	2:22
5.	"I Just Want to Have Something to Do" (basic rough mix)	Joey Ramone	2:42
6.	"I Don't Want You" (basic rough mix)		2:27
7.	"I'm Against It" (basic rough mix)		2:07
8.	"It's a Long Way Back" (basic rough mix)	Dee Dee Ramone	2:22
9.	"I Walk Out" (basic rough mix)		2:20
10.	"Bad Brain" (basic rough mix)		2:12
11.	"Needles and Pins" (basic rough mix)	Bono, Nitzsche	2:20
12.	"I Wanna Be Sedated" (take 2, basic rough mix)	Joey Ramone	2:25
13.	"I Wanted Everything" (basic rough mix)	Dee Dee Ramone	3:25
14.	"Go Mental" (basic rough mix)		2:47
15.	"She's the One" (basic rough mix)		2:14
16.	"Questioningly" (take 2, basic rough mix)	Dee Dee Ramone	3:12
17.	"S.L.U.G." (basic rough mix)	Joey Ramone	2:16
18.	"Don't Come Close" (basic rough mix)	Dee Dee Ramone	2:43
19.	"I Wanna Be Sedated" (backing track)	Joey Ramone	2:28
20.	"I Don't Want You" (Brit pop mix)		2:27
21.	"Questioningly" (acoustic version)	Dee Dee Ramone	3:23
22.	"Needles and Pins" (acoustic version)	Bono, Nitzsche	2:20
23.	"Don't Come Close" (acoustic version)	Dee Dee Ramone	2:45
24.	"I Wanna Be Sedated" ("Ramones-On-45 Mega-Mix")	Joey Ramone	5:12
Total length:			64:15

Notes

- All tracks produced and engineered by T. Erdelyi and Ed Stasium, assisted by Ray Janos and Ramona Jan, at Mediasound, New York, 1978.
- Tracks 1 and 2 are outtakes from the Road to Ruin sessions.
- Tracks 3, 5–18 mixed by T. Erdelyi and Ed Stasium, 1978.
- Track 4 remixed by Ed Stasium, 1979.
- Tracks 1, 2, 19–23 mixed by Ed Stasium, 2018.
- Track 24 remixed by Ed Stasium and Paul Robb at Right Track Recording, New York, 1988. Edits by Paul Brown, concept by Kevin Laffey.
- All tracks, except 3, 4 and 24, previously unissued.

Disc 3

Live at The Palladium, New York City (December 31, 1979)
No.	Title	Writer(s)	Length
1.	"Blitzkrieg Bop" (live)	Tommy Ramone, Dee Dee Ramone	2:35
2.	"Teenage Lobotomy" (live)	Ramones	2:08
3.	"Rockaway Beach" (live)	Dee Dee Ramone	2:01
4.	"I Don't Want You" (live)		2:16
5.	"Go Mental" (live)		1:59
6.	"Gimme Gimme Shock Treatment" (live)	Dee Dee Ramone, Johnny Ramone	1:27
7.	"I Wanna Be Sedated" (live)	Joey Ramone	2:16
8.	"I Just Want to Have Something to Do" (live)	Joey Ramone	2:33
9.	"She's the One" (live)		1:59
10.	"This Ain't Havana" (live)		2:06
11.	"I'm Against It" (live)		2:00
12.	"Sheena Is a Punk Rocker" (live)	Joey Ramone	2:12
13.	"Havana Affair" (live)		1:32
14.	"Commando" (live)	Dee Dee Ramone, Johnny Ramone	1:34
15.	"Needles and Pins" (live)	Bono, Nitzsche	2:25
16.	"I Wanna Be Your Boyfriend" (live)	Tommy Ramone	1:47
17.	"Surfin' Bird" (live)	Al Frazier, Carl White, Sonny Harris, Turner Wilson	2:33
18.	"Cretin Hop" (live)	Ramones	1:27
19.	"All the Way" (live)		2:04
20.	"Judy Is a Punk" (live)	Joey Ramone	1:13
21.	"California Sun" (live)	Henry Glover, Morris Levy	1:41
22.	"I Don't Wanna Walk Around With You" (live)	Dee Dee Ramone	1:20
23.	"Today Your Love, Tomorrow the World" (live)	Dee Dee Ramone	1:42
24.	"Pinhead" (live)	Ramones	2:17
25.	"Do You Wanna Dance?" (live)	Bobby Freeman	1:34
26.	"Suzy Is a Headbanger" (live)		1:47
27.	"Let's Dance" (live)	Jim Lee	1:40
28.	"Chinese Rock" (live)	Dee Dee Ramone, Richard Hell	2:16
29.	"Beat on the Brat" (live)	Joey Ramone	2:17
30.	"We're a Happy Family" (live)	Ramones	2:01
31.	"Bad Brain" (live)		1:48
32.	"I Wanted Everything" (live)	Dee Dee Ramone	2:37
Total length:			63:29

Notes

- All tracks mixed live by Ed Stasium, and aired on WNEW-FM in New York. Sourced from Tommy Ramone's original cassette of the console recording. All tracks previously unissued.

LP

Original album - 40th anniversary Road revisited mix

- Track listing as per original album.

== Personnel ==
Adapted from AllMusic, except where noted.

Ramones

- Joey Ramone – lead vocals
- Johnny Ramone – guitar
- Dee Dee Ramone – bass, backing vocals
- Marky Ramone – drums

Additional musicians

- Ed Stasium – guitar, bass, backing vocals
- Tommy Ramone – guitar

Technical

- T. Erdelyi (Tommy Ramone) – producer, engineer
- Ed Stasium – producer, engineer
- Ray Janos – assistant engineer
- Ramona Jan – assistant engineer
- Greg Calbi – mastering
- Gus MacDonald – front cover concept
- John Holmstrom – front cover art
- John Gillespie – art direction
- Spencer Drate – design
- Danny Fields – photography
- Bob Gruen – photography
- Chip Rock – photography

== Charts ==
Chart (1978–1979)	Peak position
Australian Albums (Kent Music Report)	99
Finnish Albums (The Official Finnish Charts)	23
Swedish Albums (Sverigetopplistan)	25
UK Albums (Official Charts)	32
US Billboard 200	103

Chart (2018)	Peak position
Belgian Albums (Ultratop Wallonia)	97
Spanish Albums (Promusicae)	58
Scottish Albums (Official Charts)	72
