= Teenage Lobotomy =

- 1977 UK 7" single cover

Song by Ramones

from the album Rocket to Russia
- Released: November 1977
- Recorded: August–October 1977
- Genre: Punk rock
- Length: 2:00
- Label: Sire/Philips
- Songwriter(s): Ramones
- Producer(s): Tony Bongiovi, Tommy Ramone

"Teenage Lobotomy" is a song by the American punk rock band Ramones. It was released on their 1977 album Rocket to Russia, and became one of their most popular songs.

The song's lyrics are about a teenager who had a lobotomy because of the brain damage caused by overexposure to DDT. The lyrics also outline how this procedure can cause serious consequences to the brain, with the line "Gonna get my Ph.D, I'm a teenage lobotomy." The composition features more complex melodies than that of other songs from the album, with the album's engineer Ed Stasium proclaiming it to be a "mini-Ramones Symphony".

"Teenage Lobotomy" has been released as downloadable content for the music video game Rock Band.

== Personnel ==
- Joey Ramone – lead vocals
- Johnny Ramone – guitar
- Dee Dee Ramone – bass, backing vocals
- Tommy Ramone – drums, producer

=== Production ===
- Tony Bongiovi – producer
- Ed Stasium – engineer
- Don Berman – assistant engineer
- Greg Calbi – mastering
