= Too Tough to Die =

Studio album by the Ramones
- Released: October 1, 1984
- Recorded: July 1984
- Studio: Mediasound (New York City)
- Genres: Punk rock; heavy metal; hardcore punk
- Length: 36:13
- Label: Sire
- Producers: T. Erdelyi; Ed Stasium

Ramones chronology
Subterranean Jungle (1983)	Too Tough to Die (1984)	Animal Boy (1986)

Singles from Too Tough to Die
- 1. "Howling at the Moon (Sha-La-La)" b/w "Wart Hog" Released: December 1984 (US)

Too Tough to Die is the eighth studio album by the American punk rock band Ramones. It was released on October 1, 1984, and is the first Ramones record to feature Richie Ramone on drums. With ex-member Tommy Ramone producing (credited as T. Erdelyi), the recording process was similar to that of the band's 1976 self-titled debut album. Likewise, the record's style—both lyrically and compositionally—saw the band returning to their roots. The photograph on the album cover, which features silhouettes of the band members, resulted from a "lucky accident" after photographer George DuBose's camera malfunctioned.

The album's overall style leaned toward that of punk rock and heavy metal music, rather than pop music which had been a focus of several of the band's previous albums. Too Tough to Die borrows upon elements such as guitar riffs from 1983's Subterranean Jungle. For the second time, after "Time Bomb" on Subterranean Jungle, bassist Dee Dee Ramone performs lead vocals on the album and receives vocal credits for two tracks. The album also contains the band's only instrumental piece, "Durango 95".

Critics appreciated the band's return to earlier methods of writing, recording, and production, noting they had strayed from the pop music genre. Despite critical acclaim, Too Tough to Die performed poorly in album sales. At this point in their career, the album was the band's lowest peaking record on the Billboard 200.

== Recording and production ==
The recording of Too Tough to Die began in the summer of 1984 at the Mediasound Studios in New York City. The album's recording process used similar techniques which were used to record their 1976 eponymous album, with Rolling Stone's Kurt Loder describing it as "virtually live in the studio". The album marked the debut of new drummer Richie Ramone, who replaced Marky Ramone after he was fired for excessive drinking. The album's songs were written mainly by bassist Dee Dee Ramone and guitarist Johnny Ramone, while lead singer Joey Ramone did not participate in the process as much as usual because he "wasn't feeling well" prior to recording. Joey did, however, write the songs "No Go" and "Daytime Dilemma (Dangers of Love)" after receiving help with the guitar part for the latter song by Daniel Rey. Johnny Ramone recalled:

As we got ready to make Too Tough To Die, we were focused in the same direction, and it made a difference. We knew we needed to get back to the kind of harder material we'd become known for. The pop stuff hadn't really worked, and we knew we were much better off doing what we did best.

Previous Ramones records featured celebrity record producers in an attempt to gain some sort of popularity. Since this method did not yield the results which they were expecting, Sire Records contacted the producers of 1978's Road to Ruin: Ed Stasium and ex-band member Tommy Ramone. Too Tough to Die has less production value than previous recordings by the Ramones. Because critics often disapproved of the sound quality on End of the Century and Pleasant Dreams, the band leaned towards a harsher sound.

Too Tough to Die was also the first of three studio albums that were licensed from Sire Records to the independent record label Beggars Banquet Records for release in the UK. The deal saw the group's work promoted better and resulted placings on the UK album and singles charts. The group had not charted in the UK since 1980's End of the Century.

== Cover art ==
The cover photo for the album was taken by photographer George DuBose in a tunnel in Central Park, New York City, near the Central Park Zoo. In the photo, the band members are standing side-by-side underneath an underpass arch, with their dark silhouettes illuminated in the background with blue lighting and dry ice fog. Johnny wanted the artwork to conceptually refer to the film A Clockwork Orange, released in 1971. DuBose relates: "Johnny wanted a picture that would evoke memories of the gang in A Clockwork Orange." DuBose also stated that the band did not need their faces on the cover because they had grown significantly in popularity; however, he originally intended to include their faces. The photograph on the album cover was a "lucky accident" after DuBose's flashes failed to fire and he unintentionally shot the band members in silhouette.

== Music and compositions ==
Just as the recording methods resembled that of the band's 1970s era, the musical style which they produced also favored the band's earlier approach to punk rock. Even though "Howling at the Moon (Sha-La-La)" featured a synthpop feel, the overall sound leaned more toward heavy metal music rather than pop music, which had been a major focus of the band's writing process throughout the 1980s. Authors Scott Schinder and Andy Schwartz explained:

With Tommy Ramone/Erdelyi and Ed Stasium returning as producers, the album was, to some degree, the Ramones' response to America's burgeoning hard-core punk scene, and did much to restore the band's musical credibility ... Too Tough to Die reclaimed the Ramone's original values of energy, catchiness, and brevity without resorting to retro pandering. It also featured the band's strongest set of songs since Rocket to Russia, with Dee Dee (who wrote or co-wrote nine of the album's thirteen songs) demonstrating a thoughtful, introspective edge on 'I'm Not Afraid of Life' and an apocalyptic social conscience on 'Planet Earth 1988.'

Stephen Thomas Erlewine of AllMusic wrote that the album uses the "big guitar riffs" featured on Subterranean Jungle and transfigures them to be "shorter and heavier". The songs featured on the album are mostly rather short and have a considerably fast tempo, which was a typical quality of the band's early work. The album features the only instrumental piece which the band released: "Durango 95", which clocks in at under a minute, being the shortest Ramones track on a studio album. (The album also includes one of the longest Ramones studio recordings, "Daytime Dilemma (Dangers of Love)" on side two.) The title of "Durango 95" is a reference to a car driven in A Clockwork Orange. "Durango 95" and "Wart Hog" are two songs which are 7/4 in certain parts of both songs, a meter which is extremely rare in punk rock.

Too Tough to Die is also the second Ramones release which did not feature lead singer Joey Ramone on each track; both "Wart Hog" and "Endless Vacation" feature bassist Dee Dee Ramone as lead vocalist, while "Durango 95" is a short instrumental. Initially, "Wart Hog"'s appearance on the album was declined by Joey Ramone, but guitarist Johnny Ramone argued for including the song, later stating, "If I hadn't lobbied for them, they wouldn't be on the [album]." The lyrics to the song were not included on the initial printing of the album because Sire considered the drug-inspired lyrics to be too explicit for potential fans. In his autobiography, Commando, Johnny Ramone stated the album title was in reference to a near fatal beating he received in 1983 that required emergency brain surgery.

== Reception ==
Professional ratings
Review scores
Source	Rating
AllMusic	4.5/5 stars
Robert Christgau	A
Rolling Stone	4/5 stars
Spin Alternative Record Guide	6/10

Too Tough to Die was generally well received by critics. Music critic Robert Christgau suggested that the album's sound was a retreat to their earlier styles "with the cleansing minimalism of their original conception evoked", saying their initial sound was "augmented rather than recycled". Kurt Loder of Rolling Stone concluded his review by saying that "Too Tough to Die is a return to fighting trim by the kings of stripped-down rock & roll." In a retrospective review, Stephen Thomas Erlewine of AllMusic called it "the last great record [the Ramones] would ever make" and noted that the use of Tommy Ramone as the album's producer was beneficial since it aided in the group returning "to simple, scathing punk rock". He also stated that the album reads "like a reaction to hardcore punk", while still maintaining their more melodic style in songs.

The album was the band's lowest peaking record at that point in their career, debuting at number 171 on the US Billboard 200. It also peaked at number 49 on the Swedish Sverigetopplistan chart, and in a revival of fortunes spent three weeks on the UK Albums Chart where it peaked at number 63. The only single released from the album, "Howling at the Moon (Sha-La-La)" (backed with "Wart Hog" in the US and "Chasing the Night" in the UK) peaked at number 85 on the UK Singles Chart, where it spent two weeks.

Guitar World magazine placed the album on their list of "New Sensations: 50 Iconic Albums That Defined 1984".

== Track listing ==
Track listing adapted from the Too Tough to Die expanded edition liner notes.

Side one
No.	Title	Writer(s)	Length
1.	"Mama's Boy"	Johnny Ramone, Dee Dee Ramone, T. Erdelyi	2:09
2.	"I'm Not Afraid of Life"	Dee Dee Ramone	3:12
3.	"Too Tough to Die"	Dee Dee Ramone	2:35
4.	"Durango 95" (Instrumental)	Johnny Ramone	0:55
5.	"Wart Hog"	Dee Dee Ramone, Johnny Ramone	1:54
6.	"Danger Zone"	Dee Dee Ramone, Johnny Ramone	2:03
7.	"Chasing the Night"	Joey Ramone, Dee Dee Ramone, Busta Jones	4:25

Side two
No.	Title	Writer(s)	Length
8.	"Howling at the Moon (Sha-La-La)"	Dee Dee Ramone	4:06
9.	"Daytime Dilemma (Dangers of Love)"	Joey Ramone, Daniel Rey	4:31
10.	"Planet Earth 1988"	Dee Dee Ramone	2:54
11.	"Humankind"	Richie Ramone	2:41
12.	"Endless Vacation"	Dee Dee Ramone, Johnny Ramone	1:45
13.	"No Go"	Joey Ramone	3:03

2002 Expanded Edition CD (Warner Archives/Rhino) bonus tracks
No.	Title	Writer(s)	Length
14.	"Street Fighting Man" (B-side)	Mick Jagger, Keith Richards	2:56
15.	"Smash You" (B-side)	Richie Ramone	2:23
16.	"Howling at the Moon (Sha-La-La)" (demo)	Dee Dee Ramone	3:17
17.	"Planet Earth 1988" (demo; Dee Dee vocal version)	Dee Dee Ramone	3:02
18.	"Daytime Dilemma (Dangers of Love)" (demo)	Joey Ramone, Daniel Rey	4:06
19.	"Endless Vacation" (demo)	Dee Dee Ramone, Johnny Ramone	1:46
20.	"Danger Zone" (demo; Dee Dee vocal version)	Dee Dee Ramone, Johnny Ramone	2:07
21.	"Out of Here" (demo)	Ramones	4:10
22.	"Mama's Boy" (demo)	Johnny Ramone, Dee Dee Ramone, T. Erdelyi	2:15
23.	"I'm Not an Answer" (demo)	Ramones	2:16
24.	"Too Tough to Die" (demo; Dee Dee vocal version)	Dee Dee Ramone	2:35
25.	"No Go" (demo)	Joey Ramone	3:05

Note

- Tracks 14 and 15 released in January 1985 as B-sides to the UK single release of "Howling at the Moon (Sha-La-La)".
- Tracks 14–16, 18, 21–25 produced by T. Erdelyi and Ed Stasium. Tracks 17, 19 and 20 produced and mixed by T. Erdelyi.
- Tracks 16–25 previously unissued. Recorded at Daily Planet Studios, New York, 1984.

== Personnel ==
Personnel adapted from the Too Tough to Die expanded edition liner notes, except where noted.

Ramones

- Joey Ramone – lead vocals (tracks 1–3, 6–11, 13–18, 21–23, 25)
- Johnny Ramone – guitar
- Dee Dee Ramone – bass, backing vocals, lead vocals (tracks 5, 12, 17, 19, 20, 23, 24)
- Richie Ramone – drums, backing vocals

Additional musicians

- Walter Lure – additional guitar
- Jerry Harrison – synthesizer (track 7)
- Benmont Tench – keyboards (track 8)
- Ed Stasium – additional guitar (uncredited)
- David A. Stewart – additional guitar (track 8) (uncredited)
- Daniel Rey – additional guitar (track 9) (uncredited)

Production

- Tommy Ramone (credited as T. Erdelyi) – producer, associate producer (track 8)
- Ed Stasium – producer, associate producer (track 8), engineer
- David A. Stewart – producer (track 8)
- Mark Cobrin – assistant engineer
- Steven Rinkoff – assistant engineer
- Glenn Rosenstein – assistant mixing engineer
- Jack Skinner – mastering
- Tony Wright – cover design
- George DuBose – photography

== Charts ==
Chart (1984)	Peak position
Finnish Albums (The Official Finnish Charts)	26
Swedish Albums (Sverigetopplistan)	49
UK Albums (Official Charts)	63
US Billboard 200	171
