= Subterranean Jungle =

Studio album by the Ramones
- Released: February 28, 1983
- Recorded: October 1982
- Studio: Kingdom Sound (Syosset, Long Island)
- Genres: Punk rock; power pop; hard rock
- Length: 33:21
- Label: Sire
- Producers: Ritchie Cordell; Glen Kolotkin

Ramones chronology
Pleasant Dreams (1981)	Subterranean Jungle (1983)	Too Tough to Die (1984)

Singles from Subterranean Jungle
- 1. "Time Has Come Today" b/w "Psycho Therapy" Released: March 1983

Subterranean Jungle is the seventh studio album by the American punk rock band Ramones, released by Sire Records on February 28, 1983. Overall, the album featured a return to a somewhat more hard punk rock style compared to the band's previous two albums End of the Century in 1980, and Pleasant Dreams in 1981, which were the most pop-focused of the band's career. This direction was encouraged by guitarist Johnny Ramone. The recording sessions saw disputes between band members, mainly due to struggles with alcohol addiction by Joey Ramone and Marky Ramone, and the drug addiction of Dee Dee Ramone.

The album begins with two cover songs, and features a third on side two. The band's signature punk rock is supplemented by touches of hard rock, and psychedelic rock. The album was deemed by critics to be a return to the band's roots, and received mostly positive reviews. Subterranean Jungle peaked at number 83 on the US Billboard 200, but failed to chart internationally. The singles released from the album did not chart. This is the last album by the band to feature Marky Ramone on drums until the 1989 album Brain Drain. It is the first album by the band to feature lead vocals from someone other than Joey Ramone, with Dee Dee Ramone singing lead on "Time Bomb", as well as the bridge of "Outsider".

== Conception ==
Compared to their previous two albums, Subterranean Jungle marked a shift back to the band's punk rock roots. Johnny Ramone felt as though the band needed to "be focused and stop worrying about getting played [on the radio] and just make a good record." Lead singer Joey Ramone was given less stylistic freedom than on the previous two releases, and the album was shaped mostly by Johnny's preference for harder rocking material.

I guess I felt a little short-changed before. I was just writin' a lotta diverse stuff and maybe I felt I was gonna get restricted, I dunno [sic]. Now that we've done it and we've been playing around for about a month, though, we're unanimous. 'Cause it has that real edge again, it has a real powerful sound—somethin' we lost a little on the last two albums.

— Joey Ramone

Three of the four members of the band, Johnny being the exception, were facing issues with addiction. Both Joey and drummer Marky Ramone were dealing with alcoholism, while bassist Dee Dee Ramone was severely addicted to cocaine and was undergoing psychotherapeutic treatment. Since the Ramones' previous two releases had producers who proved disappointing to the members, they were skeptical of the producer for Subterranean Jungle, Ritchie Cordell. Marky relates: "I hated the production, I hated the producer."

The artwork for Subterranean Jungle features an image of the band inside a subway car. The photograph was taken by George DuBose at the subway station on 57th Street and Sixth Avenue in Manhattan. This cover concept was designed by Dubose, who suggested that since the B Sixth Avenue Express train stopped at the empty station for about 20 minutes. In the photograph, Marky is featured peering out the subway window—Marky was positioned this way after Johnny asked DuBose to do so, because "they were kicking him out of the band, but he didn't know it yet." Marky recalled that he "liked that shot, but [he] knew something was up."

I was lying on my bed, watching Kojak when Joey calls me and says, 'Mark, I feel bad about this, but, uh, you can't be in the band anymore.' I deserved it. Joey was okay about it, but the others, forget it. No one called me after that. If it was today, Joey would've said, 'Why don't we take off for a month and you get sober?' But I didn't want to tell Joey or the band about my being in rehab, because I would've been admitting my guilt.

— Marky Ramone

The internal conflicts during recording sessions would cause band members to fire Marky during the album's recording, consequently substituting him with drummer Billy Rogers on "Time has Come Today." Johnny recounts, "We were having trouble with Mark because his drinking problem was really bad. So we did "Time Has Come Today" with a different drummer, Billy Rogers, from Walter Lure's band." "Time Has Come Today" became the Ramones' only song to involve three drummers: Marky Ramone on the album credits, Billy Rogers on the recording and Richie Ramone in the music video.

== Compositions and lyrics ==
The album opens with two cover songs; the first, "Little Bit O' Soul", popularized by the Music Explosion in 1967, was originally written by John Carter and Ken Lewis, and the second, "I Need Your Love", was first performed by the song's writer Bobby Dee Waxman in local New York band the Boyfriends in the late 1970s. Subterranean Jungle is the first Ramones release to begin with a song not written by the band. This track list structure was criticized by author Everett True, who said that it was "disorientating." Johnny also thought that the fact that including three covers on the album was a bad idea, saying, "we shouldn't have, but I was happy with the guitar sound on it." The album's third track, "Outsider", was written by Dee Dee and, in 2002, it was covered by Green Day on Shenanigans. "What'd Ya Do?" was track number four, and was described by music journalist Chuck Eddy as "crudely metallic." Eddy also deemed the next track, "Highest Trails Above", as "AOR-mystic." "Somebody Like Me" was called a "full-on rock anthem" by True, who went on to say that the lyrics contained "no-nonsense lines."

"Psycho Therapy"
The music featured on Subterranean Jungle was an attempted return to the band's origins. "Psycho Therapy", which was released on the album, serves as an example of this, and was said by Dave Thompson to be "searing".

Side two of the album begins with "Psycho Therapy", which was written by both Johnny and Dee Dee; the song has since grown into one of the Ramones' most popular songs. Dee Dee recalled: "I knew we needed a real 'Ramones song' for the album, and I knew [Johnny] was depressed about how things were going. He needed that song to get excited about the band again," while Johnny stated, “I wanted to do a hardcore song to show the hardcore people that we can play as fast or faster than they can. Nobody plays faster than us.” The next track is another cover song, "Time Has Come Today", which was originally recorded in 1967 by the soul music group the Chambers Brothers. The Ramones' version of the song featured a psychedelic rock influence, and was said by Eddy to have more of a "garage" feel to it, as compared to the original. "My-My Kind of a Girl" was directed specifically toward the band's female fandom. The lyrics were written by Joey about meeting a girl on 8th Street in Manhattan and wanting to spend his life with her. In Vanity Fair, the song was regarded as a "lingering affection for Phil Spector's pop grandeur." Dee Dee's "Time Bomb", which was track number eleven, was described by True as "more ridiculous than frightening." The album concludes with "Everytime I Eat Vegetables It Makes Me Think of You", which author Todd Anderson called a "sing along."

== Release and reception ==
Professional ratings
Review scores
Source	Rating
AllMusic	3.5/5 stars
Robert Christgau	A−
The Rolling Stone Album Guide	2/5 stars
Spin Alternative Record Guide	4/10

Subterranean Jungle was released by Sire Records in February 1983. In a contemporary review for The Village Voice, music journalist Robert Christgau wrote that despite containing two inferior pieces ("Highest Trails Above" and "I Need Your Love"), the album is "more worthy of an audience than anything they've done in the '80s." Stereo Review magazine strongly recommended it to "headbangers of all ages" as "a textbook Ramones album" whose unintellectual lyrics about mental illness and drug abuse "can actually be refreshing." The album peaked at number 83 in on the Billboard 200 in the US, but failed to chart elsewhere. Neither of the album's singles—"Psycho Therapy" and "Time Has Come Today"—charted.

In a retrospective review for AllMusic, author Stephen Thomas Erlewine called Subterranean Jungle the band's "most enjoyable record since Rocket to Russia," and said that the producers "steered the Ramones back toward the '60s pop infatuation that provided the foundation for their early records." He ended his review by stating that it may not be defined as the "strictest sense" of punk rock; however, he strongly suggested that the band had not sounded so "alive" since their earlier days. Douglas Wolk, writing in The Rolling Stone Album Guide (2004), was less enthusiastic and called it an "attempt at radio-friendly production," with a series of cover songs that "almost recasts the group as an oldies act." In a 2004 interview for New York magazine, Johnny Ramone graded the album a "B" and said that he was pleased with its guitar sound, despite the three cover songs, while remarking "I was watching the Brewers-Cardinals World Series when we were recording it."

== Track listing ==
The following track listing can be verified through the Subterranean Jungle expanded edition liner notes.

Side one
No.	Title	Writer(s)	Length
1.	"Little Bit O' Soul"	Ken Lewis, John Carter	2:43
2.	"I Need Your Love"	Bobby Dee Waxman	3:03
3.	"Outsider"	Dee Dee Ramone	2:10
4.	"What'd Ya Do?"	Joey Ramone	2:24
5.	"Highest Trails Above"	Dee Dee Ramone	2:09
6.	"Somebody Like Me"	Dee Dee Ramone	2:34

Side two
No.	Title	Writer(s)	Length
7.	"Psycho Therapy"	Dee Dee Ramone, Johnny Ramone	2:35
8.	"Time Has Come Today"	Willie Chambers, Joseph Chambers	4:25
9.	"My-My Kind of a Girl"	Joey Ramone	3:31
10.	"In the Park"	Dee Dee Ramone	2:34
11.	"Time Bomb"	Dee Dee Ramone	2:09
12.	"Everytime I Eat Vegetables It Makes Me Think of You"	Joey Ramone	3:04

2002 expanded edition CD (Warner Archives/Rhino) bonus tracks
No.	Title	Writer(s)	Length
13.	"Indian Giver" (original mix)	Bobby Bloom, Ritchie Cordell, Bo Gentry	2:45
14.	"New Girl in Town" (album outtake)	Ramones	3:33
15.	"No One to Blame" (demo)	Ramones	2:24
16.	"Roots of Hatred" (demo)	Ramones	3:36
17.	"Bumming Along" (demo)	Ramones	2:20
18.	"Unhappy Girl" (demo)	Ramones	2:20
19.	"My-My Kind of Girl" (acoustic demo)	Joey Ramone	3:10

Notes

- Track 13: a different mix was issued as the B-side of the UK single "Real Cool Time" in September 1987.
- Track 14: previously unissued.
- Tracks 15–19: previously unissued. Recorded at Daily Planet Studios, New York City, July 1982.

== Personnel ==
The following credits are adapted from AllMusic.

Ramones

- Joey Ramone – lead vocals (tracks 1–10, 12)
- Johnny Ramone – guitar
- Dee Dee Ramone – bass guitar, backing vocals, lead vocals (track 11), co-lead vocals (track 3)
- Marky Ramone – drums (tracks 1–7, 9–12)

Additional musicians

- Walter Lure – additional guitar
- Billy Rogers – drums (track 8)

Production

- Ritchie Cordell – production
- Glen Kolotkin – production
- Ron Cote – engineering
- Stuart J. Romaine – mastering
- George DuBose – photography
- Tony Wright – cover art

== Charts ==
Chart (1983)	Peak position
US Billboard 200	83
