= Tommy Ramone =

American drummer (1949–2014)

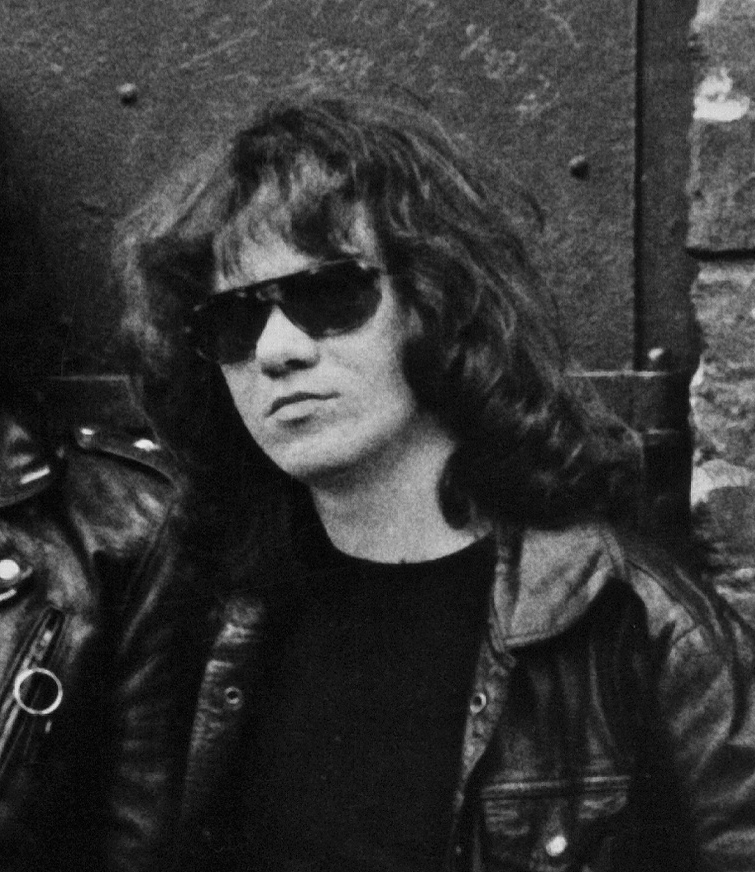
- Ramone in 1977

Background information
- Born: Tamás Erdélyi; January 29, 1949; Budapest, Hungary
- Origin: New York City, U.S.
- Died: July 11, 2014 (aged 65) Ridgewood, New York City, U.S.
- Genres: Punk rock; bluegrass
- Occupations: Musician; record producer
- Instruments: Drums; guitar
- Years active: 1965–2014
- Formerly of: Ramones
- Website: ramones.com

Signature
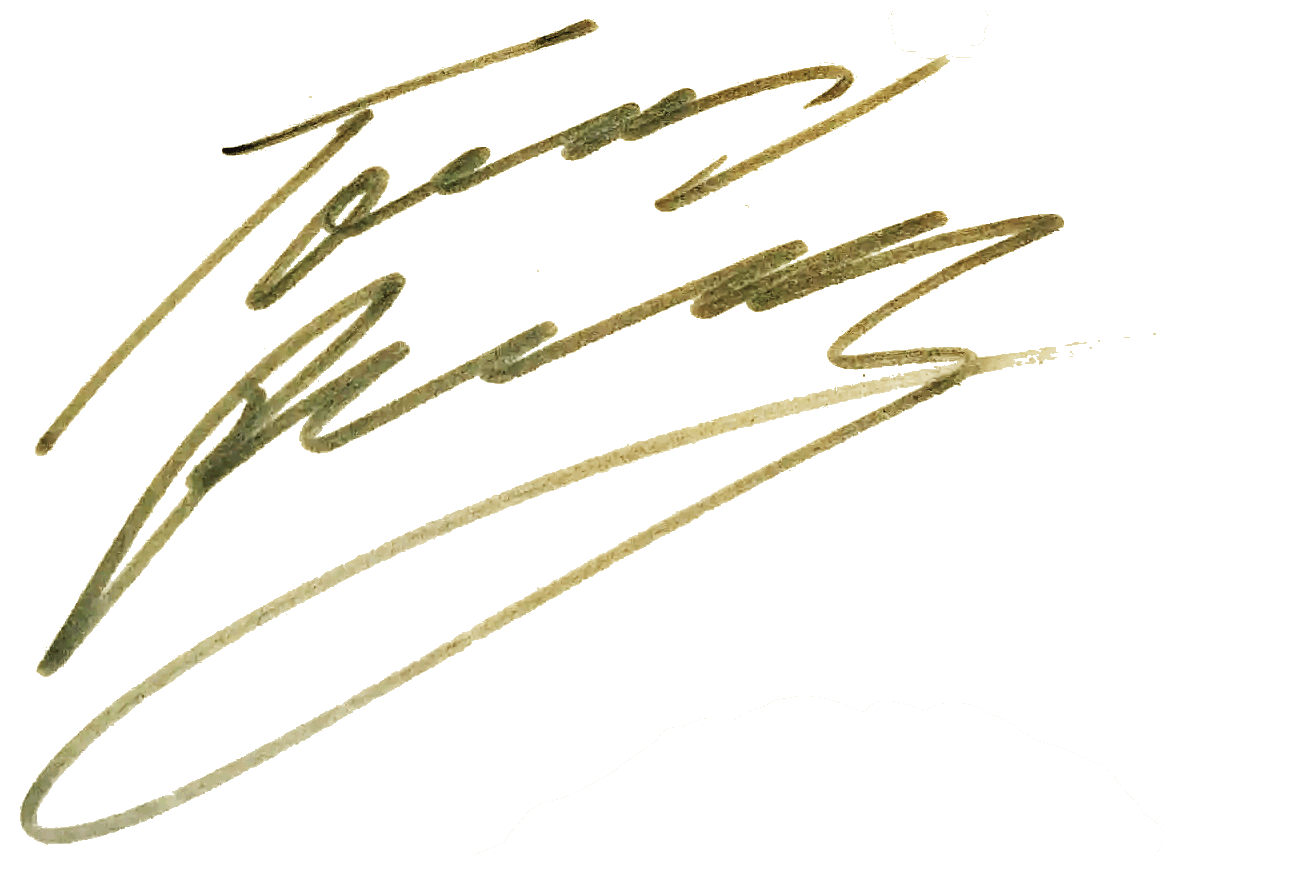

Thomas Erdelyi (born Tamás Erdélyi, [ˈɛrdeːji ˈtɒmaːʃ]; January 29, 1949 – July 11, 2014), known professionally as Tommy Ramone, was an American musician. He was the drummer for the influential punk rock band the Ramones from its debut in 1974 to 1978, also serving as its producer, and continued on as producer after stepping down as drummer. He was the longest-surviving original member of the Ramones.

== Background ==
Tamás Erdélyi was born on January 29, 1949, in Budapest. His Jewish parents were professional photographers who survived the Holocaust by being hidden by neighbors. Many of his relatives were killed by the Nazis.

The family left Hungary during the Hungarian Revolution of 1956. In 1957 he emigrated with his family to the United States. Initially settling in the South Bronx, the family moved to the middle-class neighborhood of Forest Hills in Queens, New York. Verona Estates in Forest Hills was the place where Tamás grew up and later described as "home sweet home". He changed his name to Thomas Erdelyi.

In high school, Tommy played guitar in a mid-1960s four-piece garage band, the Tangerine Puppets, with a schoolmate and guitarist, John Cummings, the future Johnny Ramone. After leaving school at 18, he started working as an assistant engineer at the Record Plant studio, where he worked on the production of the 1970 Jimi Hendrix album Band of Gypsys.

== Producer and drummer for the Ramones ==
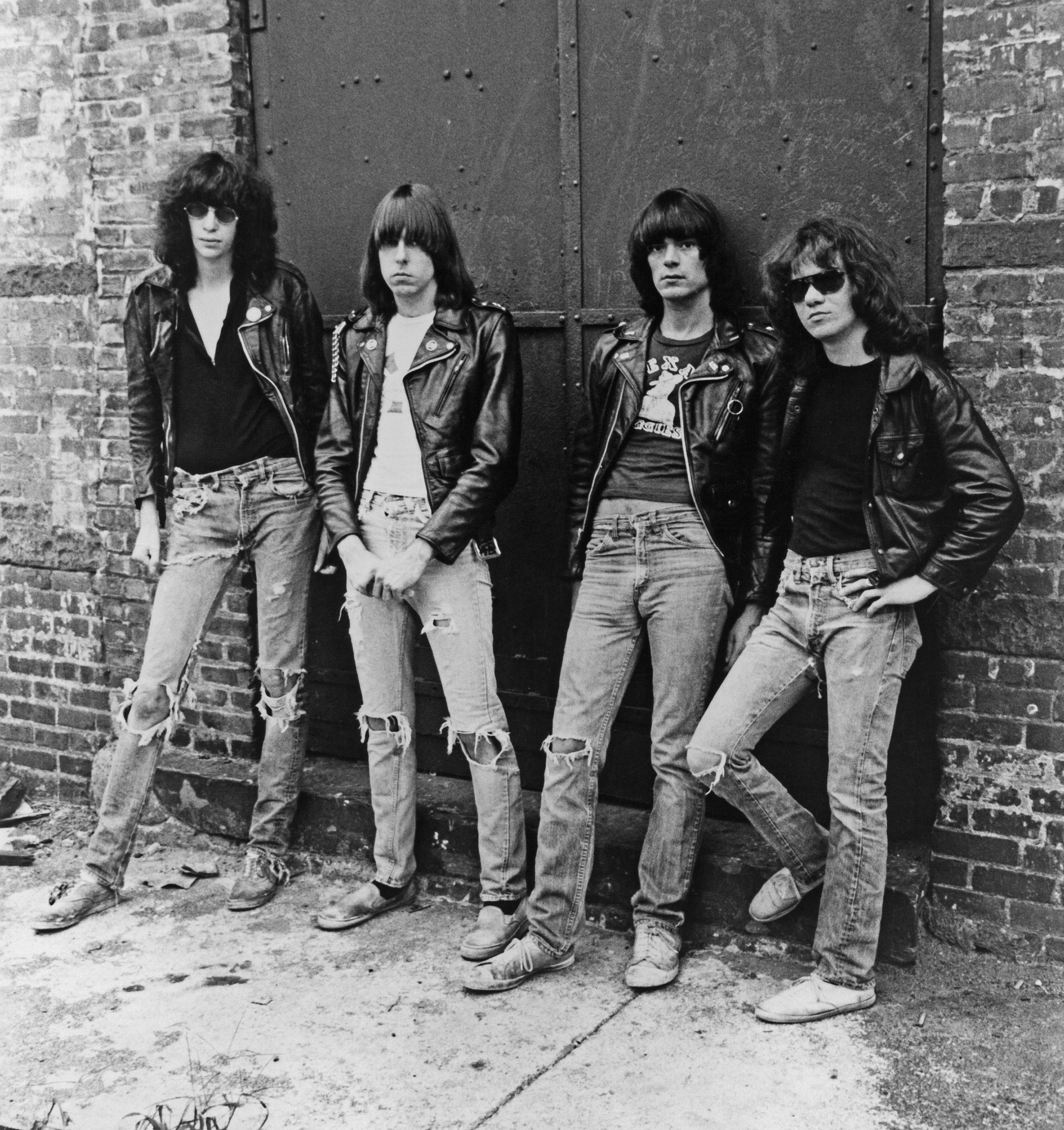
Tommy (far right) with the Ramones in 1977

When the Ramones first came together, with Johnny Ramone on guitar, Dee Dee Ramone on bass and Joey Ramone on drums, Erdelyi was supposed to be the manager, but, even though he never played drums before, was drafted as the band's drummer when Joey became the lead singer, after realizing that he couldn't keep up with the Ramones' increasingly fast tempos. "Tommy Ramone, who was managing us, finally had to sit down behind the drums, because nobody else wanted to," Dee Dee later recalled.

He remained as drummer from 1974 to 1978, playing on and co-producing their first three albums, Ramones, Leave Home, and Rocket to Russia, as well as the live album It's Alive. His final show as a Ramones drummer was at Johnny Blitz's benefit event at CBGB in New York on May 4, 1978.

In a 2007 interview with the BBC, Tommy Ramone said the band had been heavily influenced by 1970s glam-rock band the New York Dolls, by singer-songwriter Lou Reed and by pop-art figure Andy Warhol. He said, "The scene that developed at CBGB wasn't [for] a teenage or garage band; there was an intellectual element and that's the way it was for The Ramones."

== Equipment ==
Throughout his time with the Ramones, Erdelyi primarily used Rogers Drums, Slingerland snare drums, and Paiste 2002 series cymbals, live and in the studio. During the band's earliest documented shows around New York between 1974 and 1975, he used an older Rogers set in a dark wood finish that was soon replaced once Danny Fields became their manager. This new set, finished in "New England White", was used heavily between 1975 and 1977, and featured a 22-inch bass drum with 9x13 and 16x16 tom-toms. Several photos taken of Ramone during these years occasionally show him using Ludwig Drums onstage as well.

On October 22, 1977, the band lost most of their equipment after it was stolen following a show in Chicago at the Aragon Ballroom and a new, larger set of Rogers "Big R" series drums was obtained shortly afterward. This set, also finished in "New England White", featured oversized 12x15 and 18x16 tom-toms and a 24-inch bass drum and was used by Tommy for the rest of his tenure with the band, and then by Marky Ramone from the time that he joined the band in May, 1978 until his first departure in February, 1983. Featured on the recordings for It's Alive and Road To Ruin, as well as in prominent performance scenes from the film Rock 'n' Roll High School, the set was later sold to a private collector for $10,500.

== Behind the scenes with the Ramones ==
Following his decision to leave, Tommy Ramone was replaced on drums in 1978 by Marky Ramone, but continued to handle band management and co-production for their fourth album, Road to Ruin; he later returned as producer for their eighth album, 1984's Too Tough to Die.

Tommy Ramone wrote "I Wanna Be Your Boyfriend" and the majority of "Blitzkrieg Bop" while bassist Dee Dee suggested the title. He and Ed Stasium played all the guitar solos on the albums he produced, as Johnny Ramone largely preferred playing rhythm guitar. In the 1980s he produced the Replacements album Tim, as well as Redd Kross's Neurotica. He returned to the producer's chair in 2002, overseeing the reunion of former Ramones C.J. and Marky for their recording of Jed Davis' Joey Ramone tribute "The Bowery Electric".

On October 8, 2004, on what would have been Johnny Ramone's 56th birthday, he played as a Ramone once again, when he joined C.J. Ramone, Daniel Rey, and Clem Burke (also known as Elvis Ramone) in the "Ramones Beat Down on Cancer" concert. In October 2007 in an interview to promote It's Alive 1974–1996 a two-DVD set of the band's best televised live performances he paid tribute to his deceased bandmates:

They gave everything they could in every show. They weren't the type to phone it in, if you see what I mean.

Ramone and Claudia Tienan (formerly of underground band the Simplistics) performed as a bluegrass-based folk duo called Uncle Monk. Ramone stated: "There are a lot of similarities between punk and old-time music. Both are home-brewed music as opposed to schooled, and both have an earthy energy. And anybody can pick up an instrument and start playing." He joined songwriter Chris Castle, Garth Hudson, Larry Campbell and the Womack Family Band in July 2011 at Levon Helm Studios for Castle's album Last Bird Home.

== Illness and death ==
Tommy Ramone died at his home in Ridgewood, Queens, New York, on July 11, 2014, aged 65. He had received hospice care following unsuccessful treatment for bile duct cancer. His body is interred at New Montefiore Cemetery, in West Babylon, Suffolk County, New York.

In The Independent, Loulla-Mae Eleftheriou-Smith wrote that "before Tommy left the line-up, the Ramones had already become one of the most influential punk bands of the day, playing at the infamous CBGB in the Bowery area of New York and touring for each album incessantly." In response to Ramone's death, the band's official Twitter account had been tweeting previous quotes from band members, including his own 1976 comment that New York was the "perfect place to grow up neurotic". He added: "One of the reasons that the Ramones were so unique and original was that they were four original, unique people."

Writing in Variety, Cristopher Morris said: "Tommy's driving, high-energy drum work was the turbine that powered the leather-clad foursome's loud, antic sound."

== Discography ==
=== With the Ramones ===
- Ramones (1976)
- Leave Home (1977)
- Rocket to Russia (1977)
- It's Alive (recorded at Rainbow Theatre, on 31 December 1977, released in 1979)
- NYC 1978 (2003)

=== With Uncle Monk ===
- Uncle Monk (2006)

=== Production ===
- Road to Ruin – Ramones (1978)
- Too Tough to Die – Ramones (1984)
- Rattled! – The Rattlers (1985)
- Tim – The Replacements (1985)
- Neurotica – Redd Kross (1987)
- Been There, Seen That, Done That – Something Happens (1988)
