= Ed Stasium =

American record producer and audio engineer

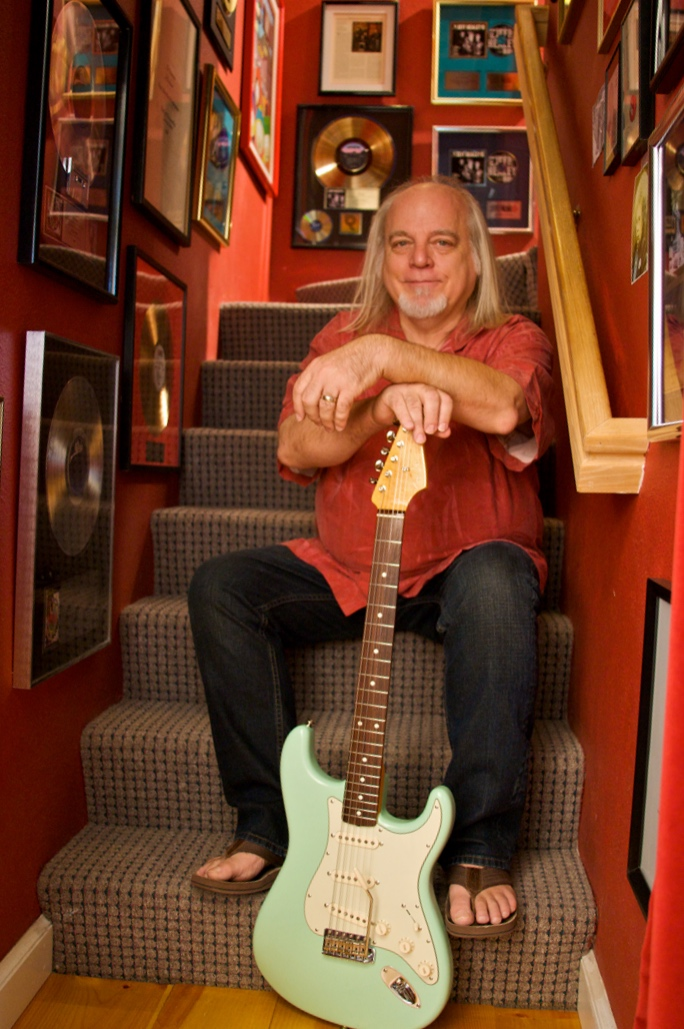
- Stasium in 2013

Background information
- Born: 1948 or 1949 (age 76–77); New Jersey, U.S.
- Genres: Rock
- Occupations: Record producer; audio engineer
- Instrument: Guitar
- Years active: 1969–present
- Labels: Warner Brothers; Enigma; Capitol; Epic

Ed Stasium is an American record producer and audio engineer, who has worked on albums by the Ramones, Talking Heads, Biohazard, the Smithereens and Living Colour.

== Early life and education ==
At ten years old in 1959, Stasium began taking piano lessons and experienced a "defining moment" when a family friend showed him how to use a reel-to-reel tape recorder. He was further influenced by seeing The Beatles make their U.S. television debut in 1964, after which he began playing guitar and forming bands as a high schooler. Stasium was raised in Green Brook Township, New Jersey and graduated from Dunellen High School.

== History ==
Stasium began his recording career in 1970 fronting the band Brandywine. He appeared on their sole LP, Aged. When he returned to the music industry three years later, it was as a recording engineer. By the end of 1975 he was hired as a staff engineer at Le Studio Morin Heights in Quebec, Canada. There he would assist with the recording of several albums by the French-Canadian band Garolou. In 1976 he was involved as a sound engineer in the production of the album Morin Heights by the Scottish band Pilot, which was recorded in Canada in the studios of the same name.

Stasium's long affiliation with the American punk and new wave, and the latter-day alternative rock, began in 1977, the year he engineered both the Ramones' Leave Home and Talking Heads' Talking Heads: 77. His production career began a year later with the Ramones' Road to Ruin, followed in 1979 by work on the group's It's Alive and the soundtrack to the film Rock 'n' Roll High School.

Stasium enjoyed perhaps his greatest success during the latter half of the 1980s. In addition to engineering Mick Jagger's Primitive Cool, he scored a major hit with Living Colour's Vivid, and also produced Soul Asylum (Hang Time), the Long Ryders (Two Fisted Tales) and Julian Cope (Saint Julian).

In 1990, he helmed the Smithereens' album, 11, reuniting with the group a year later for Blow Up; Marshall Crenshaw's Life's Too Short and Motörhead's 1916 appeared around the same time. Productions from acts including the Hoodoo Gurus (Crank) and the Reverend Horton Heat (Space Heater) followed as the decade progressed.

In 2014, he produced an album by The Empty Hearts on 429 Records. The band included Blondie drummer Clem Burke, The Chesterfield Kings bassist Andy Babiuk, The Cars guitarist Elliot Easton, The Romantics guitarist and vocalist Wally Palmar, and Small Faces and Faces pianist Ian McLagan. The album was released on August 5, 2014.

Previously living in Bayfield, Colorado, Stasium currently resides in Poway, California.

== Selected discography ==
=== As engineer ===
- Dynomite - Bazuka (1975) (engineer)
- Morin Heights - Pilot (1976) (engineer)
- Talking Heads: 77 - Talking Heads (1977) (engineer)
- Leave Home - Ramones (1977) (engineer)
- Rocket to Russia - Ramones (1977) (engineer)
- Au nord de notre vie - CANO (1977) (engineer)
- Lights Out - Peter Wolf (1984) (engineer, guitar, percussion)
- Evergreen Nights - Lisa Lougheed (1987) (engineer)

=== As producer ===
- Road to Ruin - Ramones (1978) (producer)
- It's Alive - Ramones (1979) (engineer/producer)
- Face Facts - T. Roth and Another Pretty Face (1980) (producer)
- Love's Melodies - The Searchers (1981) (co-producer)
- Code Breaker - Morse Code (1983) (producer, engineer)
- Stukas Over Disneyland - The Dickies (1983)
- Too Tough to Die - Ramones (1984) (producer)
- Translator - Translator (1984) (producer
- Evening of the Harvest - Translator (1986) (producer)
- Two Fisted Tales - The Long Ryders (1987) (producer)
- Vivid - Living Colour (1988) (producer)
- Hang Time - Soul Asylum (1988) (co-producer)
- 11 - The Smithereens (1989) (producer)
- Monster - Fetchin' Bones (1989) (producer)
- Time's Up - Living Colour (1990) (producer)
- Hell to Pay - The Jeff Healey Band (1990) (producer)
- 1916 - Motörhead (1991) (co-producer)
- Mondo Bizarro - Ramones (1992) (producer)
- The Downward Road - The Pursuit Of Happiness (1993) (producer)
- Shaved and Dangerous - Baby Animals (1993) (co-producer with Nuno Bettencourt)
- State of the World Address - Biohazard (1994) (producing, mixing)
- The Edges of Twilight - The Tea Party (1995) (producer, recorded by, mixing)
- A Search for Reason - Kilgore (1998) (producer, mixing)
- Space Heater - Reverend Horton Heat (1998) (producer)
- New World Disorder (album) - Biohazard (1999) (producer)
- Overbluecity - Skypark (2000) (producer)
- Lucky 7 - Reverend Horton Heat (2002) (producer)
- Far From Nowhere - Slick Shoes (2003) (producer)
- Knock Yourself Out - Handsome Devil (2004) (producer)
- Revival - Reverend Horton Heat (2004) (producer)
- The Devil's Rain - Misfits (2011) (producer)
- Famous Monsters - Misfits (producer, mixer, guitar)

=== Mixing ===
- More Songs About Buildings and Food - Talking Heads (1978) (mixing on "Found a Job")
- Kinky - The Hoodoo Gurus (1992) (mixing)
- The Replacements - Tim: Let It Bleed Edition (remixing)
