= It's Alive (Ramones album) =

Live album by Ramones
- Released: April 1979
- Recorded: December 31, 1977
- Venue: The Rainbow Theatre, London
- Genre: Punk rock
- Length: 53:49
- Label: Sire
- Producer: Tommy Ramone; Ed Stasium

Ramones live album chronology
It's Alive (1979)	Loco Live (1991)

It's Alive is the first live album by the American punk rock band the Ramones, titled after the 1974 horror film of the same name. It was recorded at the Rainbow Theatre in London on December 31, 1977, and released in April 1979 as a 2-LP set. The album draws from the band's first three studio albums: Ramones (1976), Leave Home (1977), and Rocket to Russia (1977). Four concerts during the UK tour were recorded, but the New Year's Eve one was chosen because ten rows of seats were thrown at the stage after the concert and it was considered the best of the performances at the venue.

"Since it was New Year's Eve, our management brought in some balloons and gave everybody these 'Gabba gabba hey' signs to wave around. It was very celebratory. Johnny Thunders was there, and Sid Vicious with his new girlfriend, Nancy Spungen. Elton John was there, dressed up like Marlon Brando in The Wild One. We'd honed our craft really sharp by then. The Ramones' sound was basically the essence of rock 'n' roll. That's what we were going for." – Tommy Ramone

The album and concert have been referred to as the band at its live peak. The concert was filmed and later released in truncated form on the 2007 compilation DVD It's Alive 1974–1996. The album was certified gold in Argentina in 1993.

== Critical reception ==
Professional ratings
Review scores
Source	Rating
AllMusic	4/5 stars
American Songwriter	4.5/5 stars
Classic Rock	9/10
Encyclopedia of Popular Music	3/5 stars
Q	4/5 stars
Record Collector	5/5 stars
The Rolling Stone Album Guide	4/5 stars
Smash Hits	8/10
Tom Hull – on the Web	B+
The Village Voice	A−

In a 1996 retrospective review, Robert Christgau of The Village Voice wrote: "Redundant when it was dropped on the punk-besotted U.K. in 1979, this concert is precious history now—seems so impossibly light and quick it makes you suspect they didn't fully sustain their live pace into their forties after all."

Paul Rigby of Record Collector described the album as a "high energy, one-hour blitz" that attests to "how high-octane they really were".

AllMusic critic Mark Deming deemed It's Alive to be "not only the best Ramones live album," but also "one of the best and most effective live albums in the rock canon, and every bit as essential as Ramones, Leave Home, or Rocket to Russia."

In 2005, It's Alive was ranked number 279 in Rock Hard magazine's book The 500 Greatest Rock & Metal Albums of All Time.

== Track listing ==
Side one
No.	Title	Writer(s)	Original release	Length
1.	"Rockaway Beach"	Dee Dee Ramone	Rocket to Russia (1977)	2:24
2.	"Teenage Lobotomy"	Ramones	Rocket to Russia (1977)	1:55
3.	"Blitzkrieg Bop"	Tommy Ramone, Dee Dee Ramone	Ramones (1976)	2:05
4.	"I Wanna Be Well"	Joey Ramone	Rocket to Russia (1977)	2:23
5.	"Glad to See You Go"	Joey Ramone, Dee Dee Ramone	Leave Home (1977)	1:51
6.	"Gimme Gimme Shock Treatment"	Johnny Ramone, Dee Dee Ramone	Leave Home (1977)	1:37
7.	"You're Gonna Kill That Girl"	Joey Ramone	Leave Home (1977)	2:28

Side two
No.	Title	Writer(s)	Original release	Length
8.	"I Don't Care"	Joey Ramone	Rocket to Russia (1977)	1:41
9.	"Sheena Is a Punk Rocker"	Joey Ramone	Rocket to Russia (1977)	2:16
10.	"Havana Affair"	Dee Dee Ramone, Johnny Ramone	Ramones (1976)	1:35
11.	"Commando"	Dee Dee Ramone, Johnny Ramone	Leave Home (1977)	1:40
12.	"Here Today, Gone Tomorrow"	Joey Ramone	Rocket to Russia (1977)	2:55
13.	"Surfin' Bird"	Al Frazier, Sonny Harris, Carl White, Turner Wilson	Rocket to Russia (1977)	2:20
14.	"Cretin Hop"	Ramones	Rocket to Russia (1977)	1:46

Side three
No.	Title	Writer(s)	Original release	Length
15.	"Listen to My Heart"	Dee Dee Ramone	Ramones (1976)	1:36
16.	"California Sun"	Henry Glover	Leave Home (1977)	1:45
17.	"I Don't Wanna Walk Around With You"	Dee Dee Ramone	Ramones (1976)	1:25
18.	"Pinhead"	Ramones	Leave Home (1977)	2:46
19.	"Do You Want to Dance"	Bobby Freeman	Rocket to Russia (1977)	1:39
20.	"Chain Saw"	Joey Ramone	Ramones (1976)	1:29
21.	"Today Your Love, Tomorrow the World"	Dee Dee Ramone	Ramones (1976)	1:55

Side four
No.	Title	Writer(s)	Original release	Length
22.	"Now I Wanna Be a Good Boy"	Dee Dee Ramone	Leave Home (1977)	2:03
23.	"Judy Is a Punk"	Joey Ramone	Ramones (1976)	1:14
24.	"Suzy Is a Headbanger"	Ramones	Leave Home (1977)	1:53
25.	"Let's Dance"	Jim Lee	Ramones (1976)	2:03
26.	"Oh Oh I Love Her So"	Joey Ramone	Leave Home (1977)	1:40
27.	"Now I Wanna Sniff Some Glue"	Dee Dee Ramone	Ramones (1976)	1:18
28.	"We're a Happy Family"	Ramones	Rocket to Russia (1977)	2:07

== Release history ==
It's Alive was first released on CD in the US in 1995. The album was reissued as a 4 CD/2 LP 40th Anniversary Deluxe Edition on September 20, 2019, limited to 8,000 copies. The set includes all four concerts that were recorded during the Ramones' UK tour in December 1977 and is housed in a 12x12 hardcover book, with liner notes written by Steve Albini and Ed Stasium.

== Personnel ==
Ramones

- Joey Ramone – lead vocals
- Johnny Ramone – guitar
- Dee Dee Ramone – bass, backing vocals
- Tommy Ramone – drums

Production

- Ed Stasium – engineer
- Tommy Ramone, Ed Stasium – producers
- Basing Street Studios Ltd. – mobile recording facilities
- Greb Cobb, Frank Owen, Jo Yu, Ray Doyle – mobile crew
- Ramona Janquito, Phil Shrago – studio crew
- Monte Melnick – tour manager
- Arturo Vega – lighting
- Tasco – sound, lighting

Album Design-Spencer Drate Art Director-John Gillespie Photography-Various Photographers

== Charts ==
Chart (1979)	Peak position
Swedish Albums (Sverigetopplistan)	38
UK Albums (OCC)	27

== Certifications ==
Region	Certification	Certified units/sales
Argentina (CAPIF)	Gold	30,000^{^}
Spain (Promusicae)	Gold	50,000^{^}
^{^} Shipments figures based on certification alone.
