= All the Stuff (And More) Volume One =

Compilation album by Ramones
- Released: May 31, 1990
- Recorded: 1976
- Genre: Punk rock
- Length: 1:08:52
- Label: Sire Records
- Producer: Tony Bongiovi, Tommy Ramone, Craig Leon, The Ramones

Ramones compilation album chronology
Ramones Mania (1988)	All the Stuff (And More) Volume One (1990)	All The Stuff (And More!) Volume 2 (1990)

Professional ratings
Review scores
Source	Rating
Allmusic	5/5 stars
Select	5/5 medals

All the Stuff (And More) Volume One is a compilation album by the Ramones. It includes their first two albums, Ramones and Leave Home, in their entirety, with the exception of "Carbona Not Glue", a song that was on the original release of Leave Home but was later removed from the album under pressure from the Carbona company and replaced with an early mix of "Sheena is a Punk Rocker". Also included are a handful of bonus tracks of varying origins: "I Don't Wanna Be Learned/I Don't Wanna Be Tamed" and "I Can't Be" were early, previously unreleased demos; "Babysitter" had originally been the b-side to the "Do You Wanna Dance?" single and was the first replacement of "Carbona Not Glue"; and the final two tracks, "California Sun" and "I Don't Wanna Walk Around With You", are live recordings. Liner notes were written by Oedipus of Boston punk fame.

== Track listing ==
All songs written by the Ramones, except where indicated.

1. "Blitzkrieg Bop" (Tommy Ramone) – 2:12
2. "Beat on the Brat" (Joey Ramone) – 2:31
3. "Judy Is a Punk" (Dee Dee Ramone, Joey Ramone) – 1:30
4. "I Wanna Be Your Boyfriend" (Tommy Ramone) – 2:15
5. "Chain Saw" (Joey Ramone) – 1:55
6. "Now I Wanna Sniff Some Glue" (Dee Dee Ramone) – 1:35
7. "I Don't Wanna Go Down to the Basement" (Dee Dee Ramone / Johnny Ramone) – 3:37
8. "Loudmouth" (Dee Dee Ramone / Johnny Ramone) – 2:14
9. "Havana Affair" (Dee Dee Ramone / Johnny Ramone) – 1:56
10. "Listen to My Heart" – 1:57
11. "53rd & 3rd" (Dee Dee Ramone) – 2:21
12. "Let's Dance" (Jimmy Lee) – 1:52
13. "I Don't Wanna Walk Around With You" (Dee Dee Ramone) – 1:43
14. "Today Your Love, Tomorrow the World" (Dee Dee Ramone) – 2:10
15. "I Don't Wanna Be Learned / I Don't Wanna Be Tamed" (Joey Ramone) – 1:03
16. "I Can't Be" (Joey Ramone) – 1:51
17. "Glad to See You Go" (lyrics by Dee Dee Ramone, music by Joey Ramone) – 2:10
18. "Gimme Gimme Shock Treatment" (Dee Dee Ramone, Johnny Ramone) – 1:38
19. "I Remember You" (Joey Ramone) – 2:15
20. "Oh Oh I Love Her So" (Joey Ramone) – 2:03
21. "Sheena Is a Punk Rocker" (Joey Ramone) – 2:44
22. "Suzy Is a Headbanger" – 2:08
23. "Pinhead" (Dee Dee Ramone) – 2:42
24. "Now I Wanna Be a Good Boy" (Dee Dee Ramone) – 2:10
25. "Swallow My Pride" (Joey Ramone) – 2:03
26. "What's Your Game" (Joey Ramone) – 2:33
27. "California Sun" (Henry Glover, Morris Levy) – 1:58
28. "Commando" (Dee Dee Ramone) – 1:51
29. "You're Gonna Kill That Girl" (Joey Ramone) – 2:36
30. "You Should Never Have Opened That Door" (Dee Dee Ramone, Johnny Ramone) – 1:54
31. "Babysitter" (Joey Ramone) – 2:45
32. "California Sun" (Live) (Henry Glover / Morris Levy) – 1:45
33. "I Don't Wanna Walk Around With You" (Live) (Dee Dee Ramone) – 1:35

== Charts ==
Chart (1990)	Peak position
Finnish Albums (The Official Finnish Charts)	35
