= All the Stuff (And More) Volume Two =

All the Stuff (And More) Volume 2

Compilation album by Ramones
- Released: May 31, 1990
- Recorded: 1977, 1978
- Genre: Punk rock
- Length: 73:48
- Label: Sire Records
- Producer: Tony Bongiovi, Tommy Ramone, Ed Stasium

Ramones compilation album chronology
All the Stuff (And More) Volume 1 (1990)	All the Stuff (And More) Volume 2 (1990)	Hey! Ho! Let's Go: The Anthology (1999)

Professional ratings
Review scores
Source	Rating
Allmusic	5/5 stars

All the Stuff (And More) Volume 2 is a compilation album by the Ramones. It includes their third and fourth albums, Rocket to Russia and Road to Ruin, excluding the song "Go Mental", plus bonus tracks. Some versions of the album do include "Go Mental" in its rightful place as track 24, after "I Wanna Be Sedated" and before "Questioningly", for a total of 30 tracks.

As with its companion volume All the Stuff (And More!) Volume 1, the disc includes a number of bonus tracks of varying origins: "Slug" and "Yea Yea" were early demos; "I Want You Around" is a demo version of a song included in the film Rock 'n' Roll High School; and "I Don't Want to Live This Life (Anymore)" was first issued as the b-side of the UK single "Crummy Stuff" in 1986.

== Track listing ==
All songs written by the Ramones except where indicated.

1. "Cretin Hop"
2. "Rockaway Beach" (Dee Dee Ramone)
3. "Here Today, Gone Tomorrow" (Joey Ramone)
4. "Locket Love"
5. "I Don't Care" (Joey Ramone)
6. "Sheena Is a Punk Rocker" (Joey Ramone)
7. "We're a Happy Family"
8. "Teenage Lobotomy"
9. "Do You Wanna Dance?" (Bobby Freeman)
10. "I Wanna Be Well"
11. "I Can't Give You Anything"
12. "Ramona"
13. "Surfin' Bird" (Carl White / Alfred Frazier / John Harris / Turner Wilson)
14. "Why Is It Always This Way?"
15. "Slug"
16. "I Want You Around (Original Version)"
17. "I Just Want to Have Something to Do" (Joey Ramone)
18. "I Wanted Everything" (Dee Dee Ramone)
19. "Don't Come Close"
20. "I Don't Want You"
21. "Needles and Pins" (Sonny Bono / Jack Nitzsche)
22. "I'm Against It"
23. "I Wanna Be Sedated" (Joey Ramone)
24. "Go Mental"
25. "Questioningly" (Dee Dee Ramone)
26. "She's the One"
27. "Bad Brain"
28. "It's a Long Way Back" (Dee Dee Ramone)
29. "I Don't Want To Live This Life (Anymore)"
30. "Yea, Yea"
