= It's Alive 1974–1996 =

Video by Ramones
- Released: October 2, 2007
- Recorded: 1974–1996
- Genre: Punk rock
- Length: 262 min.
- Label: Rhino Records

Professional ratings
Review scores
| Source | Rating |
|---|---|
| AbsolutePunk.net | (92%) link |

It's Alive 1974–1996 is a live DVD by the Ramones. It was released on October 2, 2007, by Rhino Records. It's a two-disc set and includes 118 tracks from 33 performances in eight countries, which span the group's career, from 1974 and 1996. Most of the performances were at concerts, but some were from TV shows like The Old Grey Whistle Test and Top of the Pops. Bonus features on Disc One include interviews, photos submitted by fans and their managers, and very rare music videos, such as "It's Not My Place (In The 9 To 5 World)", "The KKK Took My Baby Away" and "Somebody Put Something In My Drink (Rough Cut)".

== Recording dates and locations ==
=== Disc one ===
- Tracks 1 – 3 recorded at CBGB in New York, New York, USA on September 15, 1974
- Tracks 4 and 5 recorded at Max's Kansas City in New York, New York, USA on April 18, 1976
- Track 6 recorded at The Club in Cambridge, Massachusetts, USA on May 12, 1976
- Tracks 7 and 8 recorded at Max's Kansas City in New York, New York, USA on October 8, 1976
- Tracks 9 and 10 recorded at My Father's Place in Roslyn, New York, USA on April 13, 1977.
- Tracks 11 – 18 recorded at CBGB in New York, New York, USA on June 11, 1977
- Tracks 19 and 20 recorded at The Second Chance in Ann Arbor, Michigan, USA on June 26, 1977
- Tracks 21 and 22 recorded at The Ivanhoe Theater in Chicago, Illinois, USA on July 6, 1977
- Tracks 23 and 24 recorded at the early show at The Armadillo in Austin, Texas, USA on July 14, 1977
- Tracks 25 – 27 recorded at the late show at The Armadillo in Austin, Texas, USA on July 14, 1977
- Tracks 28 – 30 recorded at Liberty Hall (Houston, Texas), USA on July 15, 1977
- Tracks 31 and 32 recorded at Liberty Hall (Houston, Texas), USA on July 16, 1977
- Tracks 33 – 36 recorded at Don Kirshner's Rock Concert in Los Angeles, USA on August 9, 1977
- Tracks 37 – 39 recorded at The Camera Mart Stages in New York, New York, USA on September 3, 1977
- Tracks 40 – 53 recorded at The Rainbow Theatre in London, England on December 31, 1977

=== Disc two ===
- Tracks 1 – 11 recorded at Musikladen in Bremen, Germany on September 13, 1978
- Tracks 12 – 14 recorded at The Old Grey Whistle Test in London, England on September 19, 1978
- Track 15 recorded at Top of the Pops in London, England on September 28, 1978
- Tracks 16 and 17 recorded in Oakland, California, USA on December 28, 1978
- Tracks 18 – 20 recorded at Civic Center in San Francisco, California, USA on June 9, 1979
- Tracks 21 and 22 recorded at The Old Grey Whistle Test in London, England on January 15, 1980
- Track 23 recorded at Top of the Pops in London, England on January 31, 1980
- Track 24 recorded at Sha Na Na in Los Angeles, California, USA on May 19, 1980
- Track 25 recorded at Mandagsborsen in Stockholm, Sweden on October 26, 1981
- Tracks 26 and 27 recorded at TVE Musical Express in Madrid, Spain on November 17, 1981
- Tracks 28 – 36 recorded at US Festival in San Bernardino, California, USA on September 3, 1982
- Tracks 37 and 38 recorded at The Old Grey Whistle Test in London, England on February 26, 1985
- Tracks 39 – 45 recorded at Obras Sanitarias in Buenos Aires, Argentina on February 3, 1987
- Tracks 46 – 53 recorded at Provinssirock Festival in Seinäjoki, Finland on June 4, 1988
- Tracks 54 and 55 recorded at Rochester Institute of Technology in Rochester, New York, USA on October 8, 1988
- Tracks 56 – 62 recorded at Rolling Stone Club in Milan, Italy on March 16, 1992
- Track 63 recorded at Top of the Pops in London, England on June 29, 1995
- Tracks 64 – 66 recorded at River Plate Stadium – Estadio Antonio V. Liverti in Buenos Aires, Argentina on March 16, 1996

== Track listing ==
=== Disc one ===
1. "Now I Wanna Sniff Some Glue"
2. "I Don't Wanna Go Down to the Basement"
3. "Judy Is a Punk"
4. "I Wanna Be Your Boyfriend"
5. "53rd & 3rd"
6. "Chain Saw"
7. "Havana Affair"
8. "Listen to My Heart"
9. "I Remember You"
10. "Carbona Not Glue"
11. "Blitzkrieg Bop"
12. "Sheena Is a Punk Rocker"
13. "Beat on the Brat"
14. "Now I Wanna Sniff Some Glue"
15. "Rockaway Beach"
16. "Cretin Hop"
17. "Oh Oh I Love Her So"
18. "Today Your Love, Tomorrow the World"
19. "Rockaway Beach"
20. "Carbona Not Glue"
21. "Pinhead"
22. "Suzy Is a Headbanger"
23. "Commando"
24. "I Wanna Be Your Boyfriend"
25. "Now I Wanna Be a Good Boy"
26. "53rd & 3rd"
27. "Today Your Love, Tomorrow the World"
28. "Loudmouth"
29. "I Remember You"
30. "Gimme Gimme Shock Treatment"
31. "Oh Oh I Love Her So"
32. "Today Your Love, Tomorrow the World"
33. "Loudmouth"
34. "Judy Is a Punk"
35. "Glad to See You Go"
36. "Gimme Gimme Shock Treatment"
37. "Swallow My Pride"
38. "Pinhead"
39. "Sheena Is a Punk Rocker"
40. "Blitzkrieg Bop"
41. "I Wanna Be Well"
42. "Glad to See You Go"
43. "You're Gonna Kill That Girl"
44. "Commando"
45. "Havana Affair"
46. "Cretin Hop"
47. "Listen to My Heart"
48. "I Don't Wanna Walk Around With You"
49. "Pinhead"
50. "Do You Wanna Dance?"
51. "Now I Wanna Be a Good Boy"
52. "Now I Wanna Sniff Some Glue"
53. "We're a Happy Family"

=== Disc two ===
1. "Rockaway Beach"
2. "Teenage Lobotomy"
3. "Blitzkrieg Bop"
4. "Don't Come Close"
5. "I Don't Care"
6. "She's the One"
7. "Sheena Is a Punk Rocker"
8. "Cretin Hop"
9. "Listen to My Heart"
10. "I Don't Wanna Walk Around With You"
11. "Pinhead"
12. "Don't Come Close"
13. "She's the One"
14. "Go Mental"
15. "Don't Come Close"
16. "I'm Against It"
17. "Needles and Pins"
18. "I Want You Around"
19. "I'm Affected"
20. "California Sun"
21. "Rock ‘n’ Roll High School"
22. "Do You Remember Rock 'n' Roll Radio?"
23. "Baby I Love You"
24. "Rock ‘n’ Roll High School"
25. "We Want the Airwaves"
26. "This Business Is Killing Me"
27. "All Quiet on the Eastern Front"
28. "Do You Remember Rock ‘n’ Roll Radio?"
29. "Gimme Gimme Shock Treatment"
30. "Rock ‘n’ Roll High School"
31. "I Wanna Be Sedated"
32. "Beat on the Brat"
33. "The KKK Took My Baby Away"
34. "Here Today, Gone Tomorrow"
35. "Chinese Rocks"
36. "Teenage Lobotomy"
37. "Wart Hog"
38. "Chasing the Night"
39. "Blitzkrieg Bop"
40. "Freak Of Nature"
41. "Crummy Stuff"
42. "Love Kills"
43. "I Don't Care"
44. "Too Tough to Die"
45. "Mama's Boy"
46. "I Don't Want You Anymore"
47. "Weasel Face"
48. "Garden Of Serenity"
49. "I Just Want to Have Something to Do"
50. "Surfin’ Bird"
51. "Cretin Hop"
52. "Somebody Put Something in My Drink"
53. "We're a Happy Family"
54. "Do You Remember Rock ’n’ Roll Radio?"
55. "Wart Hog"
56. "Psycho Therapy"
57. "I Believe in Miracles"
58. "I Wanna Live"
59. "My Brain Is Hanging Upside Down (Bonzo Goes to Bitburg)"
60. "Pet Sematary"
61. "Animal Boy"
62. "Pinhead"
63. "I Don't Wanna Grow Up"
64. "I Wanna Be Sedated"
65. "R.A.M.O.N.E.S."
66. "Blitzkrieg Bop"

== Certifications ==
| Region | Certification | Certified units/sales |
|---|---|---|
| Australia (ARIA) | Gold | 7,500^{^} |
^{^} Shipments figures based on certification alone.
