= Carbon tetrachloride =

Carbon compound

Structural formula of tetrachloride
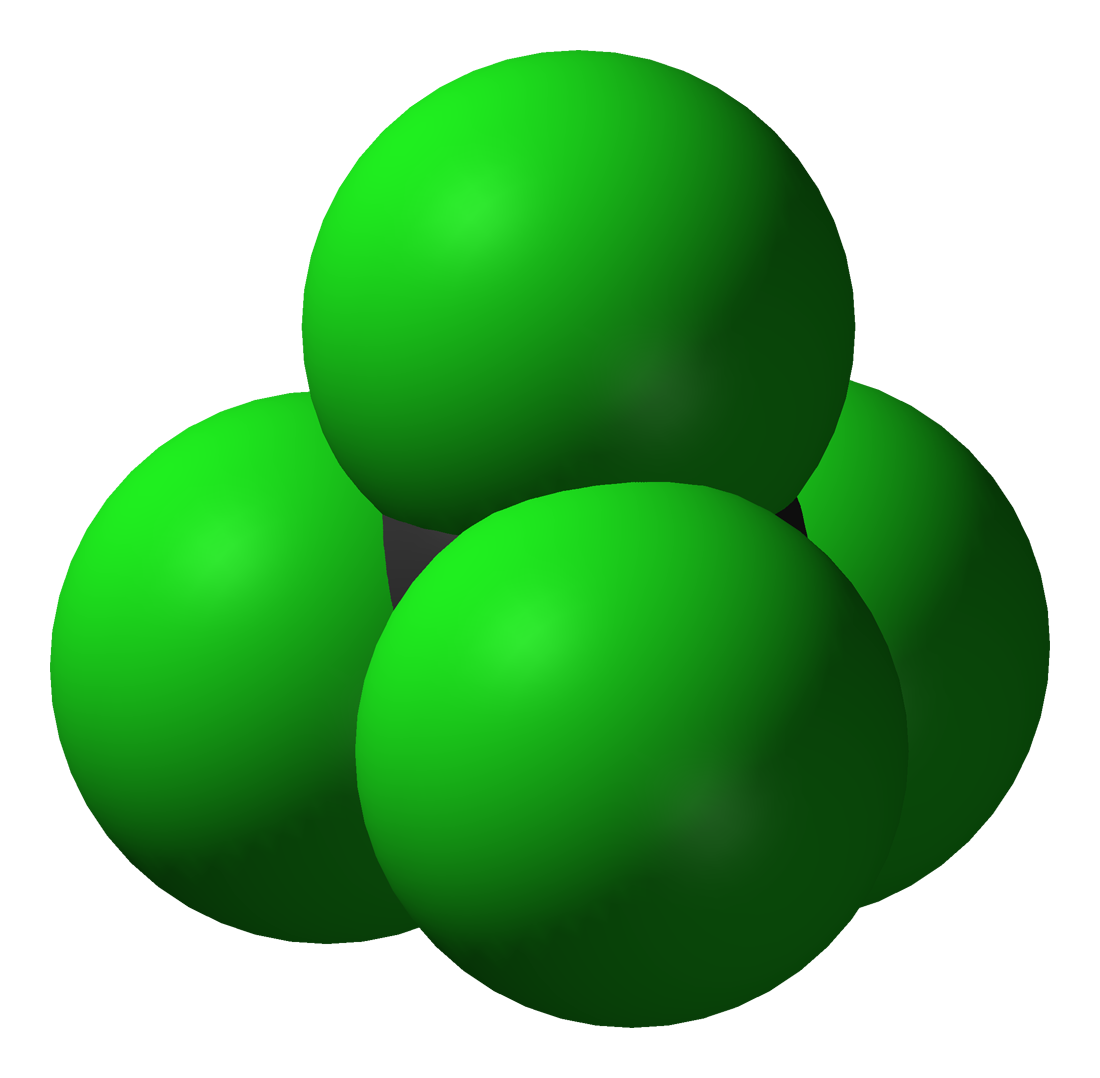
Space-filling model carbon tetrachloride
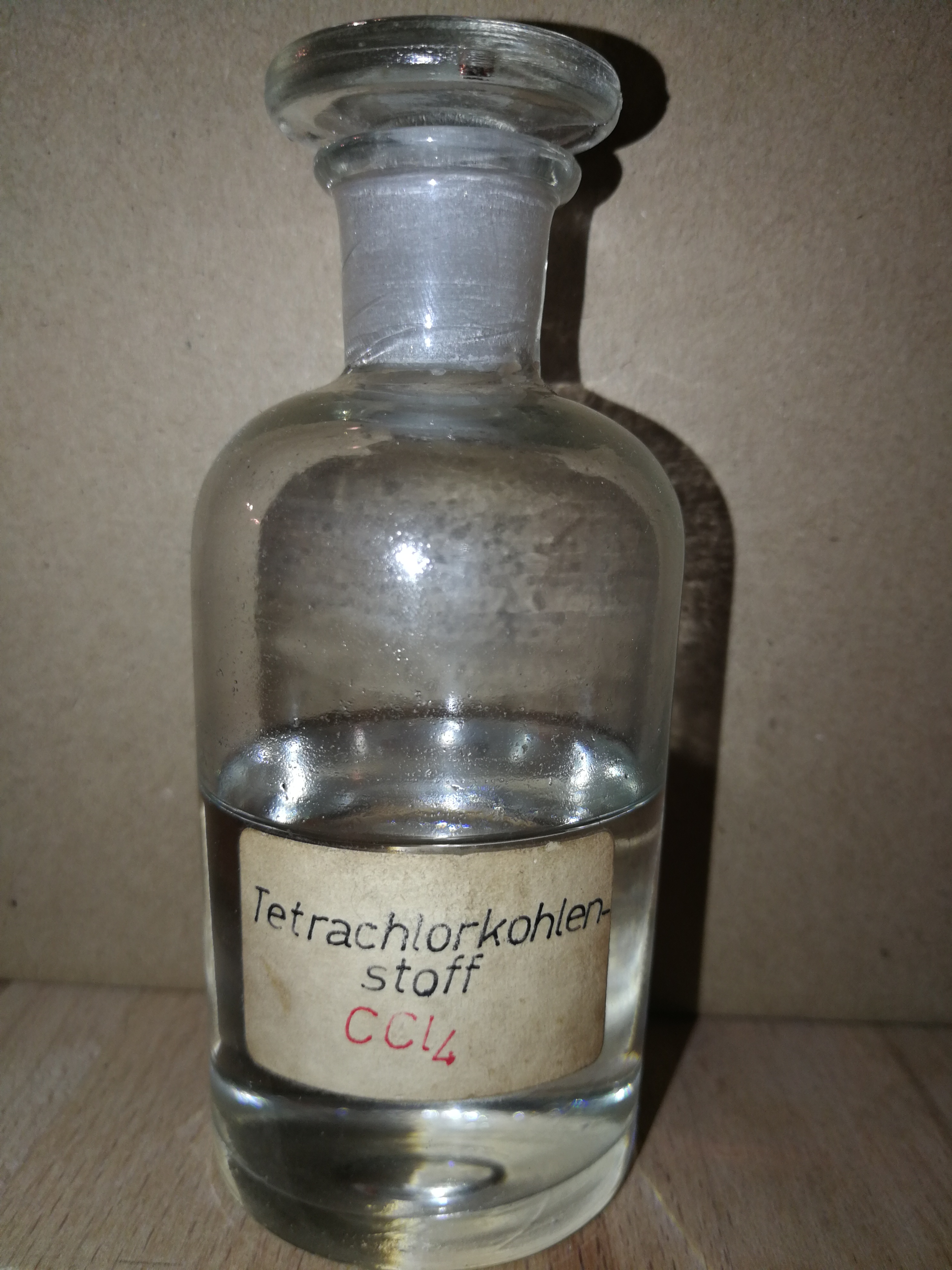
- Carbon tetrachloride

Names
- Preferred IUPAC name Tetrachloromethane
- Other names Benzinoform carbon(IV) chloride carbon tet Carboneum Tetrachloratum / Carbonei tetrachloridum Carboneum Chloratum / Carbonei chlorurum chloride of carbon Freon-10; Halon-104 methane tetrachloride methyl tetrachloride Necatorina perchloromethane Refrigerant-10; Tetrachloretum Carbonicum; Tetrachlorocarbon; Tetraform; Tetrasol

Identifiers
CAS Number	56-23-5
3D model (JSmol)	Interactive image
Abbreviations	CTC, TCM, PCM, R-10
Beilstein Reference	1098295
ChEBI	CHEBI:27385
ChEMBL	ChEMBL44814
ChemSpider	5730
ECHA InfoCard	100.000.239
EC Number	200-262-8
Gmelin Reference	2347
KEGG	C07561
PubChem CID	5943
RTECS number	FG4900000
UNII	CL2T97X0V0
UN number	1846
CompTox Dashboard (EPA)	DTXSID8020250
- InChI: InChI=1S/CCl4/c2-1(3,4)5 Key: VZGDMQKNWNREIO-UHFFFAOYSA-N; InChI=1/CCl4/c2-1(3,4)5 Key: VZGDMQKNWNREIO-UHFFFAOYAV
- SMILES: ClC(Cl)(Cl)Cl

Properties
Chemical formula	CCl_{4}
Molar mass	153.81 g·mol^{−1}
Appearance	Colourless liquid
Odor	chloroform-like odor
Density	1.5867 g·cm^{−3} (liquid); 1.831 g·cm^{−3} at −186 °C (solid); 1.809 g·cm^{−3} at −80 °C (solid)
Melting point	−22.92 °C (−9.26 °F; 250.23 K)
Boiling point	76.72 °C (170.10 °F; 349.87 K)
Solubility in water	0.097 g/100 mL (0 °C); 0.081 g/100 mL (25 °C)
Solubility	Soluble in alcohol, ether, chloroform, benzene, naphtha, CS_{2}, formic acid
log P	2.64
Vapor pressure	11.94 kPa at 20 °C
Henry's law constant (k_{H})	2.76×10^{−2} atm·m^{3}/mol
Magnetic susceptibility (χ)	−66.60×10^{−6} cm^{3}/mol
Thermal conductivity	0.1036 W/m·K (300 K)
Refractive index (n_{D})	1.4607
Viscosity	0.86 mPa·s
Dipole moment	0 D

Structure
Crystal structure	Monoclinic
Coordination geometry	Tetragonal
Molecular shape	Tetrahedral
Dipole moment	0 D

Thermochemistry
Heat capacity (C)	132.6 J/mol·K
Std molar entropy (S^{⦵}_{298})	214.39 J/mol·K
Std enthalpy of formation (Δ_{f}H^{⦵}_{298})	−95.6 kJ/mol
Gibbs free energy (Δ_{f}G^{⦵})	−87.34 kJ/mol

Hazards
- Occupational safety and health (OHS/OSH)
Main hazards	Highly toxic to the liver and kidneys, suspected carcinogen, harmful to the ozone layer
- GHS labelling
Pictograms	(GHS06: Toxic) (GHS08: Health hazard)
Signal word	Danger
Hazard statements	H301, H302, H311, H331, H351, H372, H412, H420
Precautionary statements	P201, P202, P260, P264, P270, P271, P273, P280, P281, P301+P310, P302+P352, P304+P340, P308+P313, P311, P312, P314, P321, P322, P330, P361, P363, P403+P233, P405, P501, P502
NFPA 704 (fire diamond)	3 0 0
Flash point	non-flammable
- Lethal dose or concentration (LD, LC)
LD_{50} (median dose)	7749 mg/kg (oral, mouse); 5760 mg/kg (oral, rabbit); 2350 mg/kg (oral, rat)
LC_{50} (median concentration)	5400 ppm (mammal); 8000 ppm (rat, 4 hr); 9526 ppm (mouse, 8 hr)
LC_{Lo} (lowest published)	1000 ppm (human); 20,000 ppm (guinea pig, 2 hr); 38,110 ppm (cat, 2 hr); 50,000 ppm (human, 5 min); 14,620 ppm (dog, 8 hr)
- NIOSH (US health exposure limits)
PEL (Permissible)	TWA 10 ppm C 25 ppm 200 ppm (5-minute maximum peak in any 4 hours)
REL (Recommended)	Ca ST 2 ppm (12.6 mg/m^{3}) [60-minute]
IDLH (Immediate danger)	200 ppm
Safety data sheet (SDS)	ICSC 0024

Related compounds
Other anions	Carbon tetrafluoride Carbon tetrabromide Carbon tetraiodide
Other cations	Silicon tetrachloride Germanium tetrachloride Tin tetrachloride Lead tetrachloride
Related chloromethanes	Chloromethane; Dichloromethane; Trichloromethane

Supplementary data page
- Carbon tetrachloride (data page)
- Except where otherwise noted, data are given for materials in their standard state (at 25 °C [77 °F], 100 kPa). verify (what is ?) Infobox references

Carbon tetrachloride, also known by many other names (such as carbon tet for short and tetrachloromethane, also recognised by the IUPAC), is an organochlorine compound and a tetrahalomethane with the chemical formula CCl_{4}. It is a volatile, non-flammable, dense, colourless liquid with a chloroform-like sweet odour that can be detected at low levels. It was formerly widely used in fire extinguishers, as a precursor to refrigerants, an anthelmintic and a cleaning agent, but has since been phased out because of environmental and safety concerns. Exposure to high concentrations of carbon tetrachloride can affect the central nervous system and degenerate the liver and kidneys. Prolonged exposure can be fatal.

== Properties ==
In the carbon tetrachloride molecule, four chlorine atoms are positioned symmetrically as corners in a tetrahedral configuration joined to a central carbon atom by single covalent bonds. Because of this symmetric geometry, CCl_{4} is non-polar. Methane (CH_{4}) has the same structure, making carbon tetrachloride a halomethane. As a solvent, it is well suited to dissolving other non-polar compounds such as fats and oils. It can also dissolve iodine. Carbon tetrachloride is miscible with organic solvents such as acetone, acetylacetone, aniline, benzaldehyde, benzene, benzyl alcohol, 1-butanol, butyl acetate, diethyl ether, ethanol, isoamyl alcohol, methyl isobutyl ketone, nitromethane, and pyridine; however, carbon tetrachloride is insoluble in diacetone alcohol, diethanolamine, ethylene glycol, formamide, glycerol, hydroxyethyl-ethylenediamine, and 1,3-propanediol. It is volatile, giving off vapors with an odor characteristic of other chlorinated solvents.

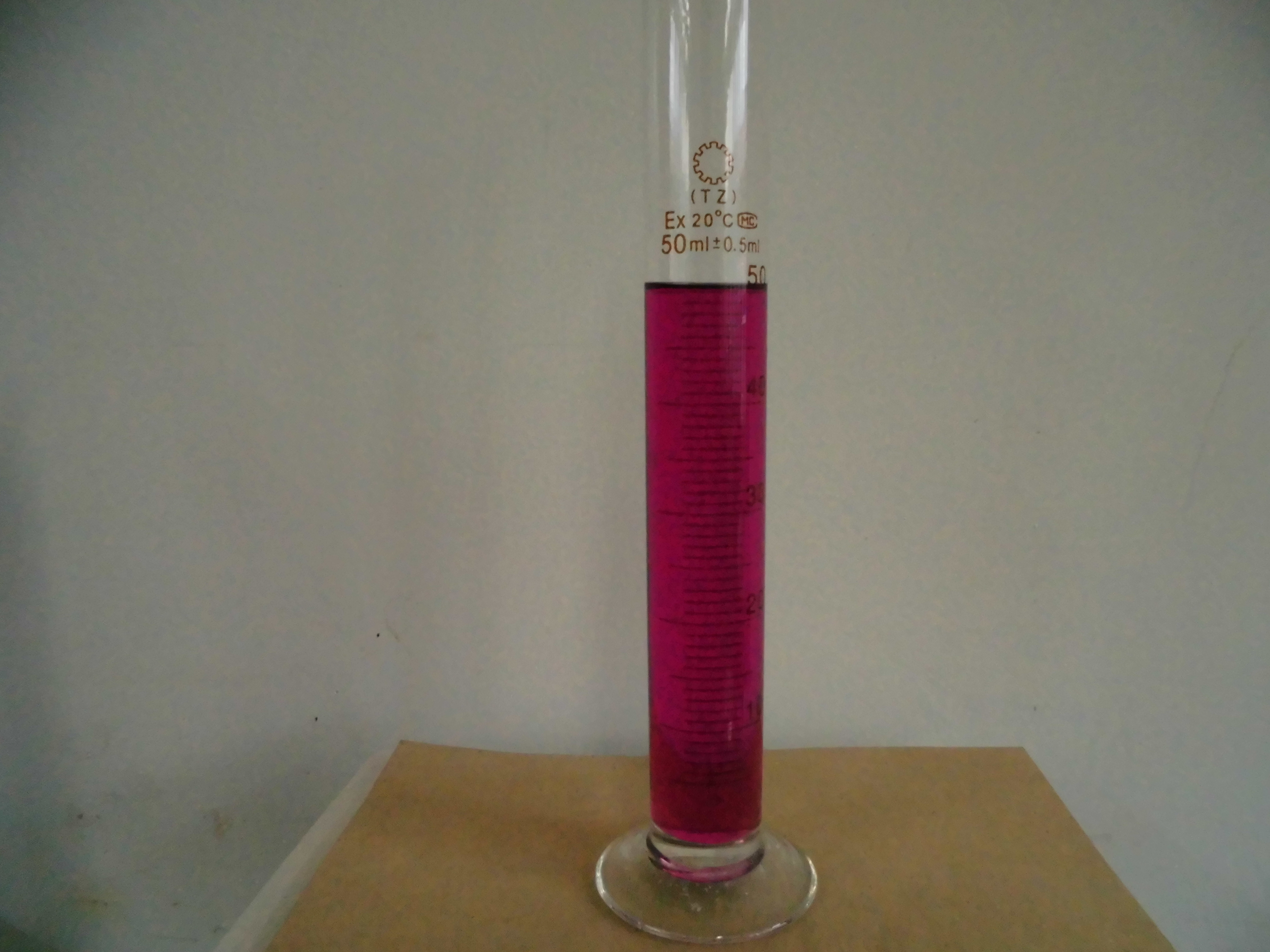
Dilute iodine solution in carbon tetrachloride

Solid carbon tetrachloride has two polymorphs: crystalline II below −47.5°C (225.6 K) and crystalline I above −47.5°C. At −47.3°C it has monoclinic crystal structure with space group C2/c and lattice constants a = 20.3, b = 11.6, c = 19.9 (.10^{−1} nm), β = 111°.

With a specific gravity greater than 1, carbon tetrachloride will be present as a dense nonaqueous phase liquid if sufficient quantities are spilt in the environment.

== Reactions ==
Despite being generally inert, carbon tetrachloride can undergo various reactions. Hydrogen or an acid in the presence of an iron catalyst can reduce carbon tetrachloride to chloroform, dichloromethane, chloromethane and even methane. When its vapours are passed through a red-hot tube, carbon tetrachloride dechlorinates to tetrachloroethylene and hexachloroethane.

Carbon tetrachloride, when treated with HF, gives various compounds such as trichlorofluoromethane (R-11), dichlorodifluoromethane (R-12), chlorotrifluoromethane (R-13) and carbon tetrafluoride with HCl as the by-product:

CCl_{4} + HF → CCl_{3}F + HCl
CCl_{4} + 2 HF → CCl_{2}F_{2} + 2 HCl
CCl_{4} + 3 HF → CClF_{3} + 3 HCl
CCl_{4} + 4 HF → CF_{4} + 4 HCl

This was once one of the main uses of carbon tetrachloride, as R-11 and R-12 were widely used as refrigerants.

An alcohol solution of potassium hydroxide decomposes it to potassium chloride and potassium carbonate in water:

CCl_{4} + 6 KOH → 4 KCl + K_{2}CO_{3} + 3 H_{2}O

Carbon is sufficiently oxophilic that many compounds react to give phosgene:

Reactants		Products	Conditions^{cite}
CO_{2} + CCl_{4}	→	2 COCl_{2}	350°C
CO + CCl_{4}	→	COCl_{2} + 1/3C_{2}Cl_{4}	
2 SO_{3} + CCl_{4}	→	COCl_{2} + (SO_{2}Cl)_{2}O	
1/3P_{2}O_{5} + CCl_{4}	→	COCl_{2} + 2/3POCl_{3}	
3 ZnO + 2 CCl_{4}	→	COCl_{2} + CO_{2} + 3 ZnCl_{2}	ZnO dry; 200°C

Reaction with hydrogen sulfide gives thiophosgene:

CCl_{4} + H_{2}S → CCl_{2}S + 2 HCl

== History and synthesis ==
Carbon tetrachloride was first obtained by the French chemist Henri Victor Regnault around 1839 from carbon compounds such as chloroform and methanol with abundant chlorine. Regnault added chlorine to chloroform under sunlight and separated the resulting liquid from chloroform by distillation. He noted the density of the liquid as 1.599 g/cm^{3} and its boiling point as 78 °C. He analyzed the elemental composition of the compound; he calculated that it consisted of 92.05% chlorine and 7.95% carbon. (Note: The actual elemental percentage of carbon and chlorine are 7.81% and 92.19% respectively.) He found the vapor density to be 5.302.

Hermann Kolbe made carbon tetrachloride in 1843 by passing chlorine over carbon disulfide through a porcelain tube. Prior to the 1950s, carbon tetrachloride was manufactured by the chlorination of carbon disulfide at 105 to 130 °C:

CS_{2} + 3 Cl_{2} → CCl_{4} + S_{2}Cl_{2}
Disulfur dichloride can further chlorinate CS_{2} to CCl_{4}:

CS_{2} + 2 S_{2}Cl_{2} → CCl_{4} + 6 S

But now it is mainly produced from methane:

CH_{4} + 4 Cl_{2} → CCl_{4} + 4 HCl

The production often utilizes by-products of other chlorination reactions, such as from the syntheses of dichloromethane and chloroform. Higher chlorocarbons are also subjected to this process named "chlorinolysis":

C_{2}Cl_{6} + Cl_{2} → 2 CCl_{4}

The production of carbon tetrachloride has steeply declined since the 1980s because of environmental concerns and the decreased demand for CFCs, which were derived from carbon tetrachloride. In 1992, production in the U.S./Europe/Japan was estimated at 720,000 tonnes. In the 2010s, the total amount of CCl_{4} produced and imported into the US annually was under 70,000 tonnes.

=== Natural occurrence ===
Carbon tetrachloride was discovered along with chloromethane and chloroform in oceans, marine algae and volcanoes. Natural emissions of carbon tetrachloride are insignificant compared to anthropogenic sources; for example, the Momotombo volcano in Nicaragua emits carbon tetrachloride at a flux of 82 grams per year while the global industrial emissions were at 2 × 10^{10} grams per year.

Carbon tetrachloride was found in red algae, specifically Asparagopsis taxiformis and Asparagopsis armata. It was detected in Southern Californian ecosystems, salt lakes of the Kalmykian steppe and a common liverwort in the Czech Republic.

== Safety ==
At high temperatures in air, it decomposes or burns to produce poisonous phosgene. This was a common problem when carbon tetrachloride was used as a fire extinguisher and there have been deaths due to its conversion to phosgene.

Carbon tetrachloride is a suspected human carcinogen, although there is no sufficient evidence of carcinogenicity in humans. The World Health Organization reported repeated long-term exposure to carbon tetrachloride can induce hepatocellular carcinomas (hepatomas) in mice and rats. The doses inducing hepatic tumors in mice and rats are higher than those inducing cell toxicity. The International Agency for Research on Cancer (IARC) classified this compound in Group 2B, "possibly carcinogenic to humans".

Carbon tetrachloride is one of the most potent hepatotoxins (toxic to the liver), so much so that it is widely used in scientific research to evaluate hepatoprotective agents. Exposure to high concentrations of carbon tetrachloride (including vapor) can affect the central nervous system and degenerate the liver and kidneys, and prolonged exposure may lead to coma or death. Chronic exposure to carbon tetrachloride can cause liver and kidney damage.

Consumption of alcohol increases the toxic effects of carbon tetrachloride and may cause more severe organ damage, such as acute renal failure, in heavy drinkers. The doses that can cause mild toxicity to non-drinkers can be fatal to drinkers.

The effects of carbon tetrachloride on human health and the environment have been assessed under REACH in 2012 in the context of the substance evaluation by France.

In 2008, a study of common cleaning products found the presence of carbon tetrachloride in "very high concentrations" (up to 101 mg/m^{3}) as a result of manufacturers' mixing of surfactants or soap with sodium hypochlorite (bleach).

Carbon tetrachloride is also both ozone-depleting and a greenhouse gas. However, since 1992 its atmospheric concentrations have been in decline for the reasons described above (see atmospheric concentration graphs in the gallery). CCl_{4} has an atmospheric lifetime of 85 years.

== Uses ==
Prior to being phased out due to toxicity and environmental impact, carbon tetrachloride was widely used as a dry cleaning solvent, as a refrigerant, and in lava lamps. In the last case, carbon tetrachloride is a key ingredient that adds weight to the otherwise buoyant wax.

One speciality use of carbon tetrachloride was in stamp collecting, to reveal watermarks on postage stamps without damaging them. A small amount of the liquid is placed on the back of a stamp, sitting in a black glass or obsidian tray. The letters or design of the watermark can then be seen clearly. Today, this is done on lit tables without using carbon tetrachloride.

In organic chemistry, carbon tetrachloride serves as a source of chlorine in the Appel reaction.

The mechanism of the Appel reaction

Carbon tetrachloride made from heavy chlorine-37 has been used in the detection of neutrinos and antineutrinos. Raymond Davis Jr. used carbon tetrachloride in his experiments to detect antineutrinos.

=== Cleaning ===
Being a good solvent for many materials (such as grease and tar), carbon tetrachloride was widely used as a cleaning fluid for nearly 70 years. It is nonflammable and nonexplosive and did not leave any odour on the cleaned material, unlike gasoline, which was also used for cleaning at the time. It was used as a "safe" alternative to gasoline. It was first marketed as Katharin, in the early 1890s and as Benzinoform later.

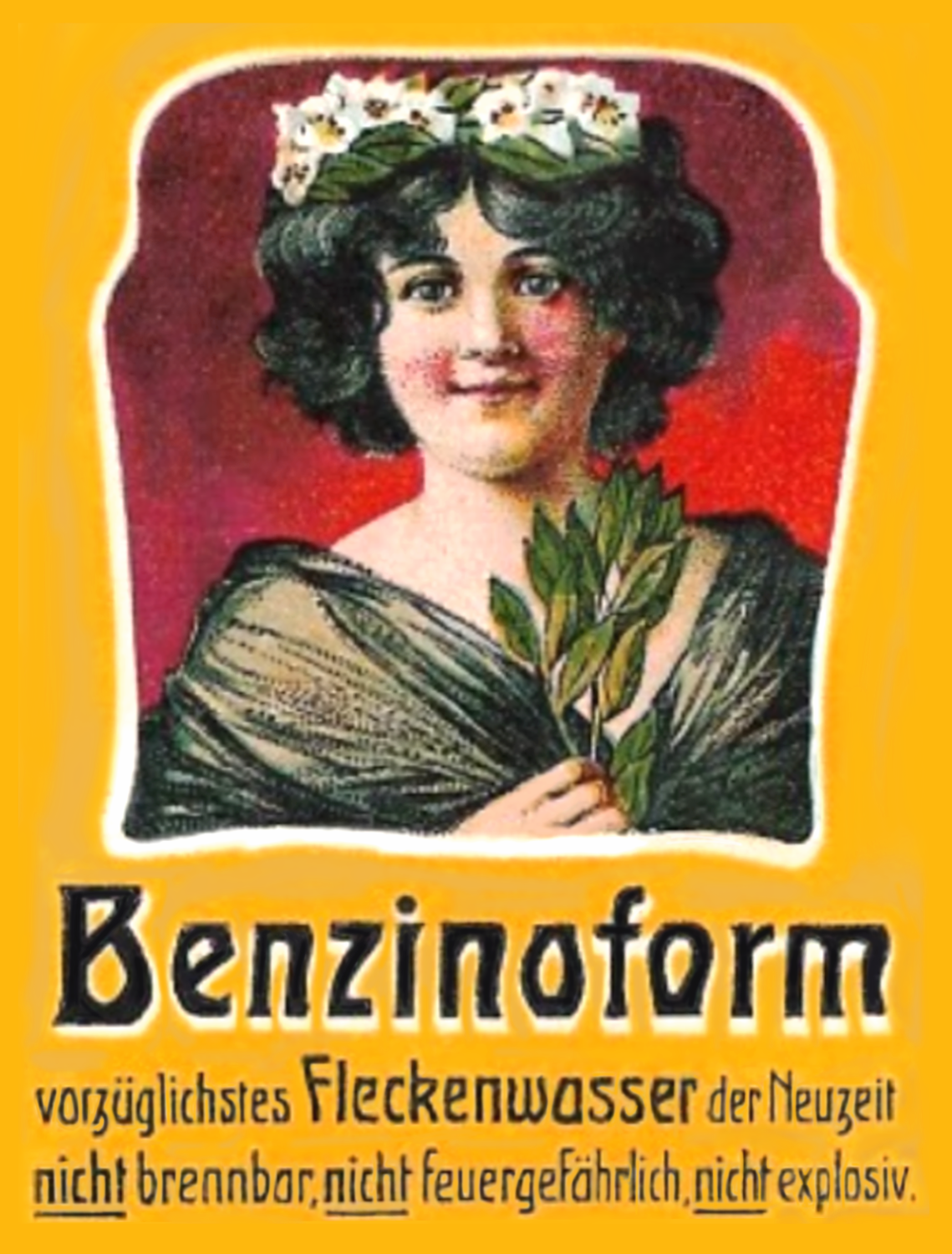
German advertisement stamp for Benzinoform (carbon tetrachloride) stain remover, 1912

Carbon tetrachloride was recommended for regularly cleaning the type slugs of typewriters in office settings in the 1940s.

Carbon tetrachloride was the first chlorinated solvent to be used in dry-cleaning and was used until the 1950s. It had the downsides of being corrosive to the dry-cleaning equipment and causing illness among dry-cleaning operators, and was replaced by less toxic and overall safer solvents such as trichloroethylene, tetrachloroethylene and methyl chloroform (trichloroethane).

Carbon tetrachloride was also used as an ingredient in dry shampoos due to its solvent properties and quick evaporation from 1903 until the 1930s, when it was discontinued due to health and safety concerns. Several women had fainted from its fumes during the hair wash at the hairdressers, and electric fans were used to blow the fumes away. In 1909, a baronet's 29-year-old daughter, Helenora Elphinstone-Dalrymple, died after having her hair shampooed with carbon tetrachloride.

It is assumed that carbon tetrachloride was still used as a dry cleaning solvent in North Korea as of 2006.

=== Medical uses ===
==== Anaesthetic and analgesic ====
Carbon tetrachloride was briefly used as a volatile inhalation anaesthetic and analgesic for intense menstruation pains and headaches in the mid-19th century.

It was introduced as a safer alternative to chloroform by the doctor Protheroe Smith in 1864. In December 1865, the Scottish obstetrician who discovered the anaesthetic effects of chloroform on humans, James Young Simpson, had experimented with carbon tetrachloride as an anaesthetic. Simpson named the compound "Chlorocarbon" for its similarity to chloroform. His experiments involved injecting carbon tetrachloride into two women's vaginas. Simpson orally consumed carbon tetrachloride and described it as having "the same effect as swallowing a capsule of chloroform".

Because of the higher amount of chlorine atoms (compared to chloroform) in its molecule, carbon tetrachloride has a stronger anaesthetic effect than chloroform and required a smaller amount. Its anaesthetic action was likened to ether, rather than the related chloroform. It is less volatile than chloroform, therefore it was more difficult to apply and needed warm water to evaporate. Its smell has been described as "fruity", quince-like and "more pleasant than chloroform", and had a "pleasant taste". Carbon tetrachloride for anaesthetic use was made by the chlorination of carbon disulfide. It was used on at least 50 patients, of which most were women in labour. During anaesthesia, carbon tetrachloride has caused such violent muscular contractions and negative effects on the heart in some patients that it had to be replaced with chloroform or ether. Such use was experimental and the anaesthetic use of carbon tetrachloride never gained popularity due to its potential toxicity.

==== Parasite medication ====
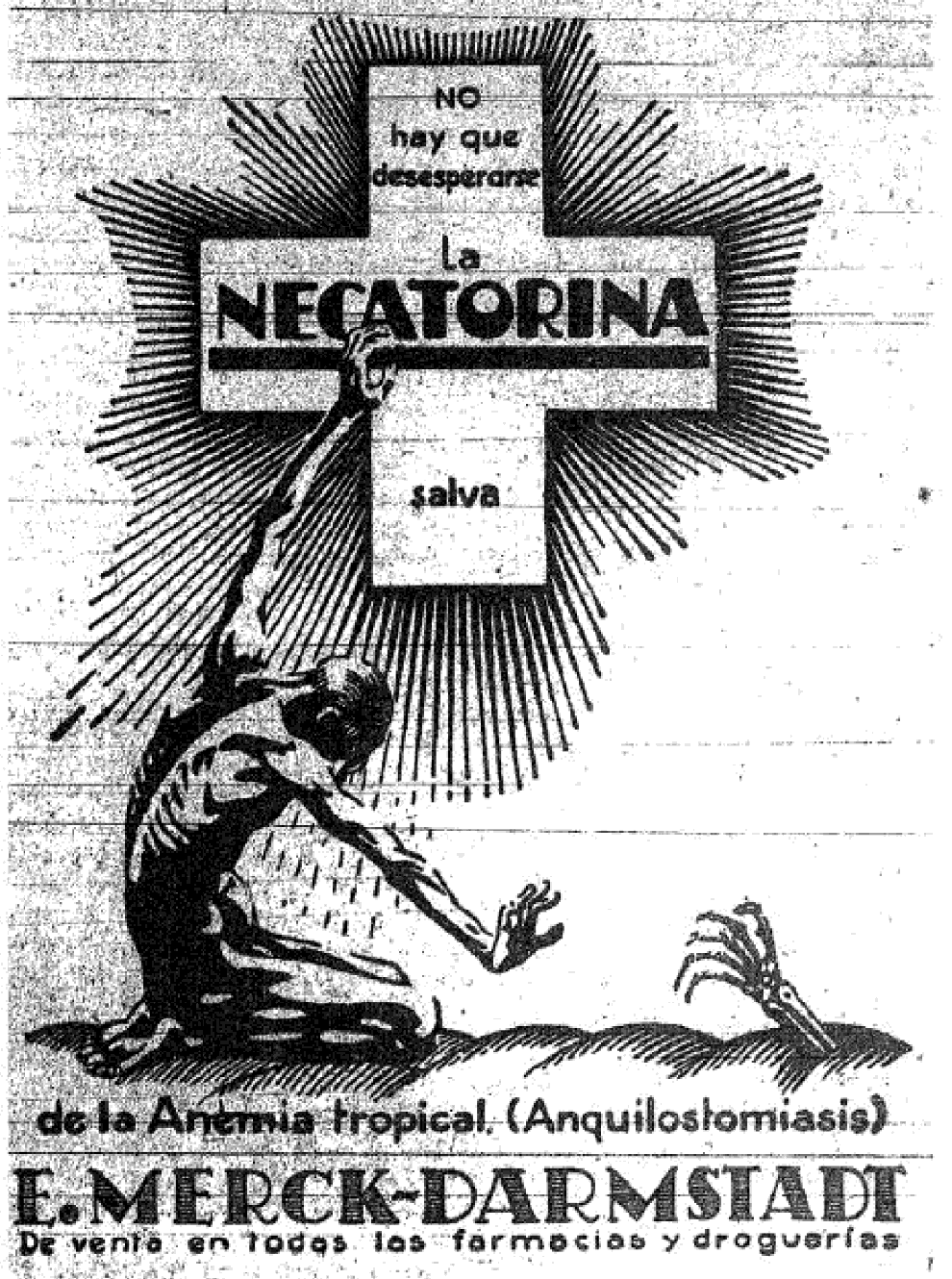
No hay que desesperarse, la Necatorina salva (do not despair, Necatorina saves) Advertisement for Merck's Necatorina, Colombia, 1942

The veterinary doctor Maurice Crowther Hall (1881–1938) discovered in 1921 that carbon tetrachloride was highly effective as an anthelmintic in eradicating hookworm via ingestion. In one of the clinical trials of carbon tetrachloride, it was tested on criminals to determine its safety for use on humans. Beginning in 1922, capsules of pure carbon tetrachloride were marketed by Merck under the name Necatorina (variants include Neo-necatorina and Necatorine). Necatorina was used as a medication against parasitic diseases in humans. This medication was most prevalently used in Latin American countries. Its toxicity was not well understood at the time and toxic effects were attributed to impurities in the capsules rather than carbon tetrachloride itself. Due to carbon tetrachloride's toxicity, tetrachloroethylene (which was also investigated by Hall in 1925) replaced its use as an anthelmintic by the 1940s.

=== Solvent ===
Carbon tetrachloride once was a popular solvent in organic chemistry, but because of its adverse health effects, it is rarely used today. It is sometimes useful as a solvent for infrared spectroscopy, because it lacks significant absorption bands above 1600 cm^{−1}. Because carbon tetrachloride does not have any hydrogen atoms, it is also used in proton NMR spectroscopy. In addition to being toxic, its dissolving power is low. Its use in NMR spectroscopy has been largely superseded by deuterated solvents (mainly deuterochloroform). The use of carbon tetrachloride in the determination of oil has been replaced by various other solvents, such as tetrachloroethylene. Because it has no C–H bonds, it is a useful solvent for halogenations either by the elemental halogen or by a halogenation reagent such as N-bromosuccinimide (these conditions are known as Wohl–Ziegler bromination).

=== Fire suppression ===
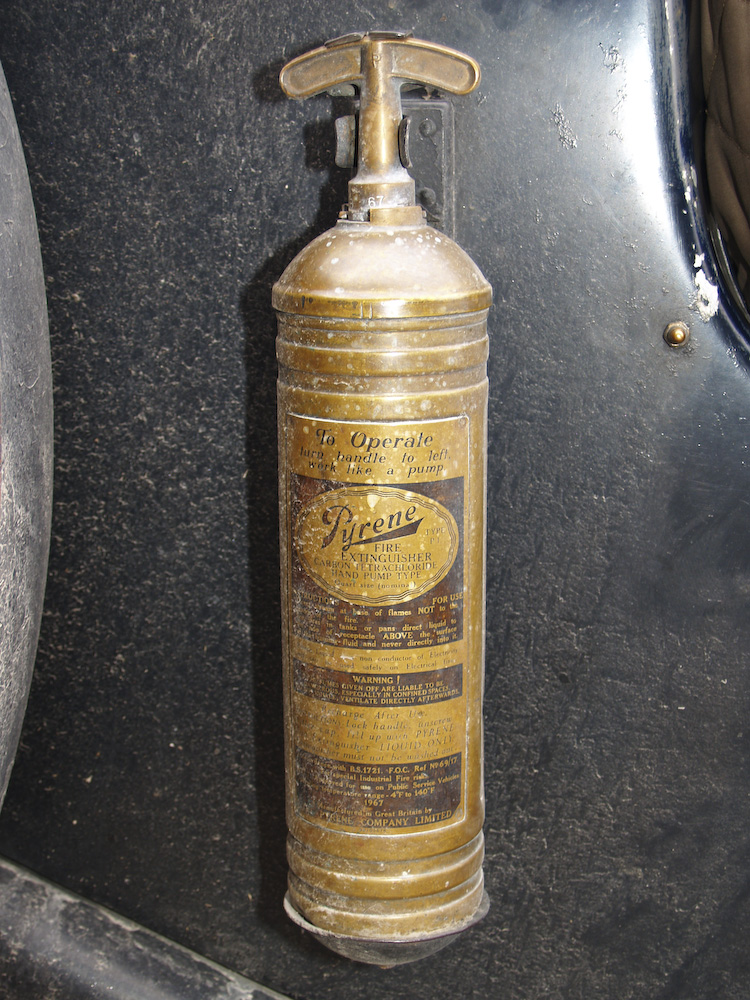
A brass Pyrene carbon tetrachloride fire extinguisher

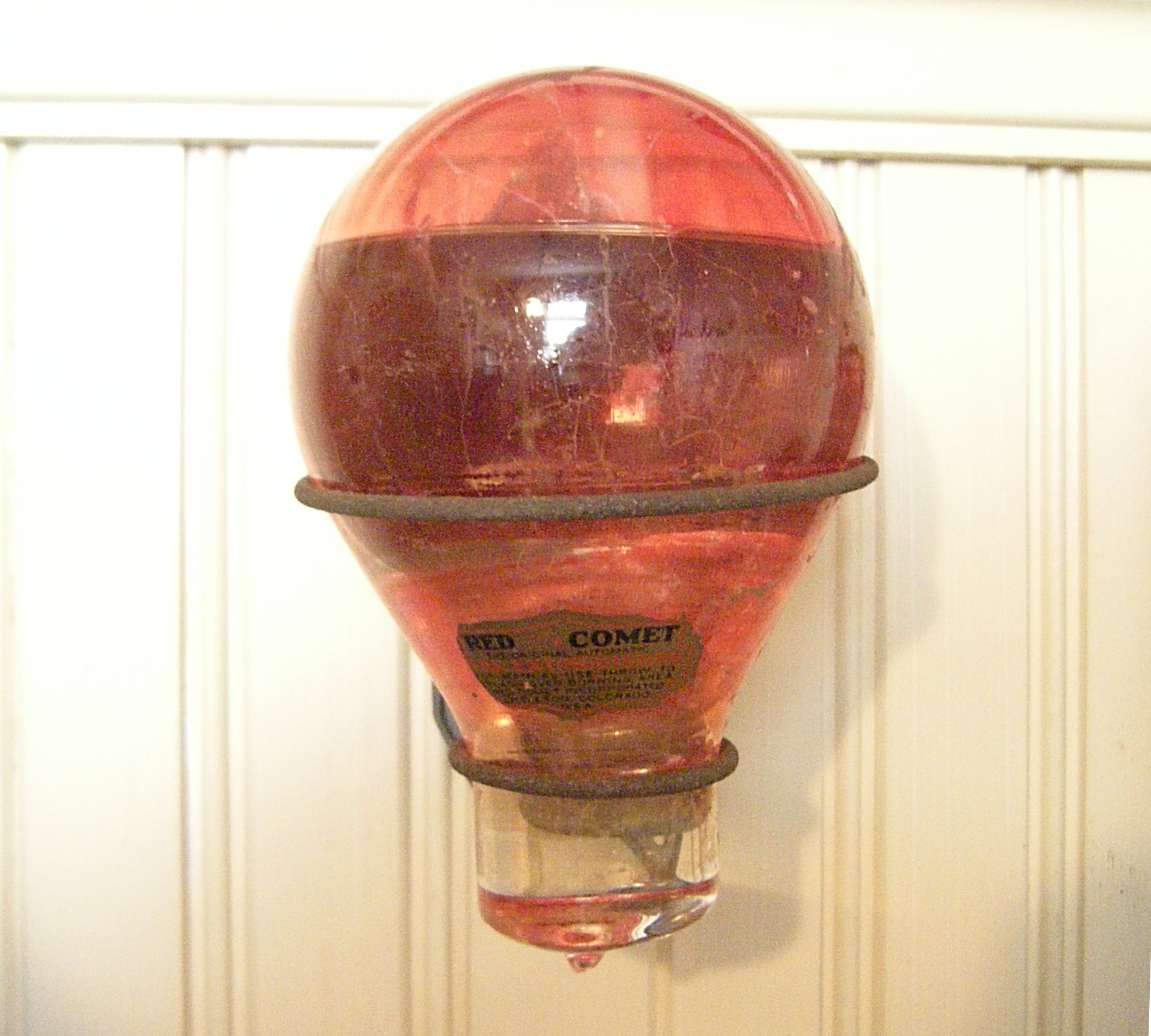
A Red Comet brand glass globe ("fire grenade") containing carbon tetrachloride

Between 1902 and 1908, carbon tetrachloride-based fire extinguishers began to appear in the United States, years after Europe.

In 1910, the Pyrene Manufacturing Company of Delaware filed a patent to use carbon tetrachloride to extinguish fires. The liquid was vaporized by the heat of combustion and extinguished flames, an early form of gaseous fire suppression. At the time it was believed the gas displaced oxygen in the area near the fire, but later research found that the gas inhibited the chemical chain reaction of the combustion process.

In 1911, Pyrene patented a small, portable extinguisher that used the chemical. The extinguisher consisted of a brass bottle with an integrated hand-pump that was used to expel a jet of liquid toward the fire. As the container was unpressurized, it could easily be refilled after use. Carbon tetrachloride was suitable for liquid and electrical fires and the extinguishers were often carried on aircraft or motor vehicles. However, as early as 1920, there were reports of fatalities caused by the chemical when used to fight a fire in a confined space.

In the first half of the 20th century, another common fire extinguisher was a single-use, sealed glass globe, a "fire grenade", filled with carbon tetrachloride or salt water. The bulb could be thrown at the base of the flames to quench the fire. The carbon tetrachloride type could also be installed in a spring-loaded wall fixture with a solder-based restraint. When the solder melted by high heat, the spring would either break the globe or launch it out of the bracket, allowing the extinguishing agent to be automatically dispersed into the fire.

Since carbon tetrachloride freezes at –23 °C, the fire extinguishers would contain only 89–90% carbon tetrachloride and 10% trichloroethylene (m.p. –85 °C) or chloroform (m.p. –63 °C) for lowering the extinguishing mixture's freezing point down to temperatures as low as –45 °C. The extinguishers with 10% trichloroethylene would contain 1% carbon disulfide as a stabiliser.

=== Refrigerants ===
Prior to the Montreal Protocol, large quantities of carbon tetrachloride were used to produce the chlorofluorocarbon refrigerants R-11 (trichlorofluoromethane) and R-12 (dichlorodifluoromethane). However, these refrigerants play a role in ozone depletion and have been phased out. Carbon tetrachloride is still used to manufacture less destructive refrigerants.

=== Fumigant ===
Carbon tetrachloride was widely used as a fumigant to kill insect pests in stored grain. It was employed in a mixture known as 80/20, that was 80% carbon tetrachloride and 20% carbon disulfide. The United States Environmental Protection Agency banned its use in 1985.

Another carbon tetrachloride fumigant preparation mixture contained acrylonitrile. Carbon tetrachloride reduced the flammability of the mixture. Most common trade names for the preparation were Acritet, Carbacryl and Acrylofume. The most common preparation, Acritet, was prepared with 34 percent acrylonitrile and 66 percent carbon tetrachloride.

== Society and culture ==
- The French writer René Daumal intoxicated himself by inhalation of carbon tetrachloride which he used to kill the beetles he collected, to "encounter other worlds" by voluntarily plunging himself into intoxications close to comatose states.
- Carbon tetrachloride is listed (along with salicylic acid, toluene, sodium tetraborate, silica gel, methanol, potassium carbonate, ethyl acetate and "BHA") as an ingredient in Peter Parker's (Spider-Man) custom web fluid formula in the book The Wakanda Files: A Technological Exploration of the Avengers and Beyond.
- Australian YouTuber Tom of Explosions&Fire and Extractions&Ire made a video on extracting carbon tetrachloride from an old fire extinguisher in 2019, and later experimenting with it by mixing it with sodium, and the chemical gained a fan base called "Tet Gang" on social media (especially on Reddit). The channel owner later used carbon tetrachloride-themed designs in the channel's merch.
- In the Ramones song "Carbona Not Glue" released in 1977, the narrator says that huffing the vapours of Carbona, a carbon tetrachloride-based stain remover, was better than huffing glue. They later removed the song from the album as Carbona was a corporate trademark.

=== Famous deaths from carbon tetrachloride poisoning ===
- Evalyn Bostock (1917–1944), British actress who died from accidentally drinking carbon tetrachloride after mistaking it for her drink while working in a photographic darkroom.
- Harry Edwards (1887–1952), an American director who died from carbon tetrachloride poisoning shortly after directing his first television production.
- Zilphia Horton (1910–1956), American musician and activist who died from accidentally drinking a glass full of carbon tetrachloride-based typewriter cleaning fluid that she mistook for water.
- Margo Jones (1911–1955), American stage director who was exposed to the fumes of carbon tetrachloride that was used to clean off paint from a carpet. She died a week later from kidney failure.
- Jim Beck (1919–1956), American record producer, died after exposure to carbon tetrachloride fumes while cleaning recording equipment.
- Tommy Tucker (1933–1982), American blues singer, died after using carbon tetrachloride in floor refinishing.

== Gallery ==
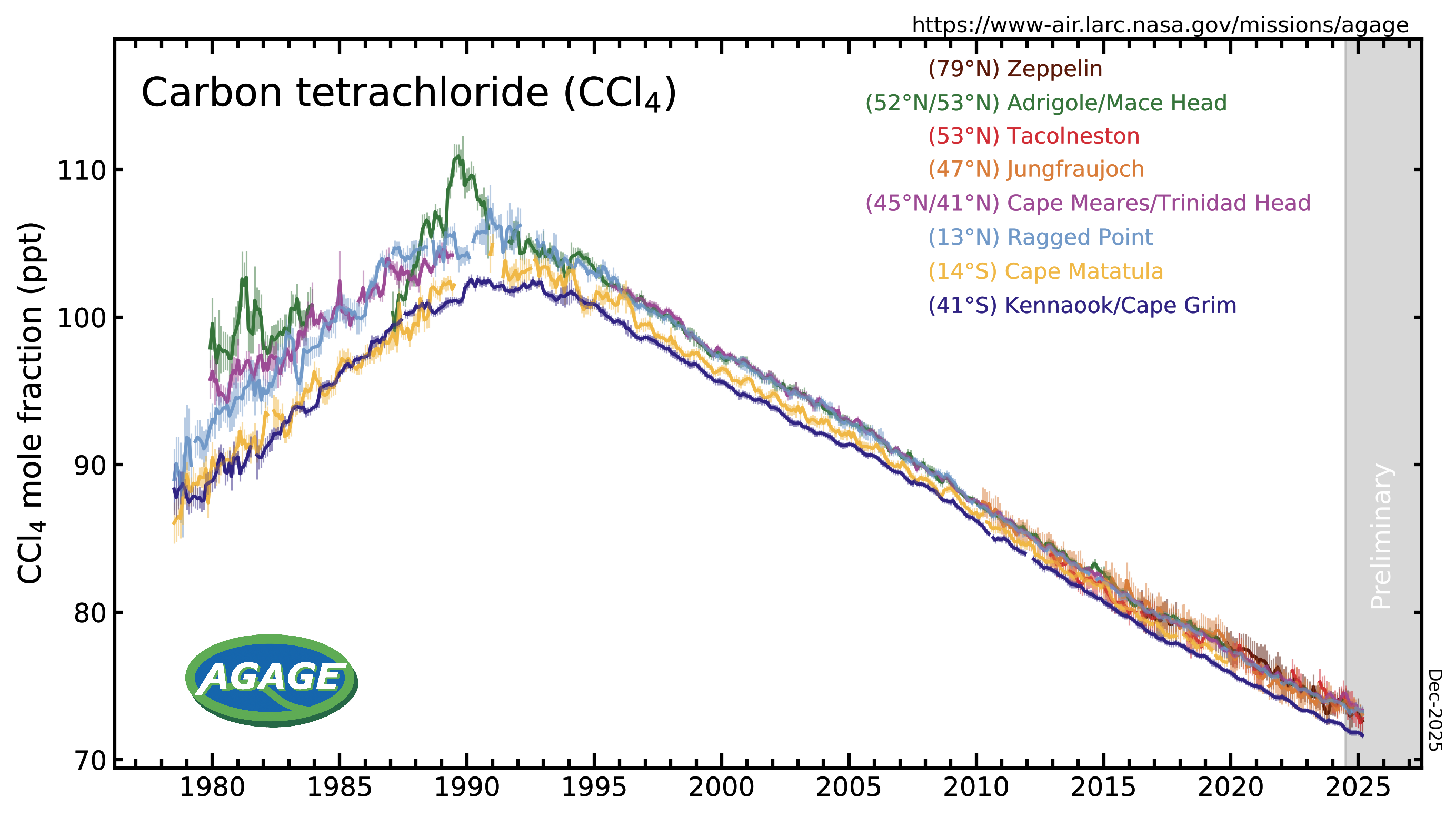
CCl_{4} measured by the Advanced Global Atmospheric Gases Experiment (AGAGE) in the lower atmosphere (troposphere) at stations around the world. Abundances are given as pollution-free monthly mean mole fractions in parts-per-trillion.

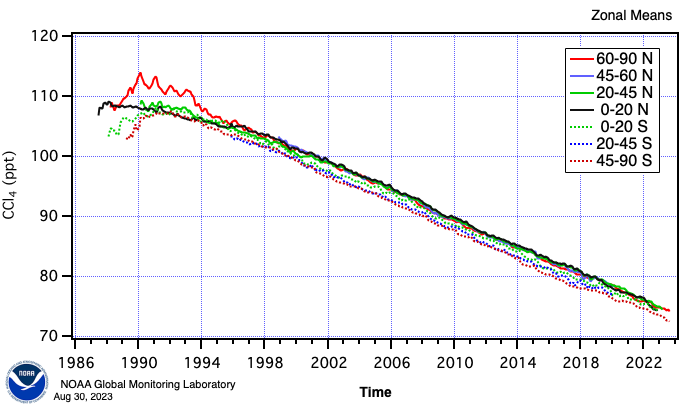
Hemispheric and Global mean concentrations of CCl_{4} (NOAA/ESRL).

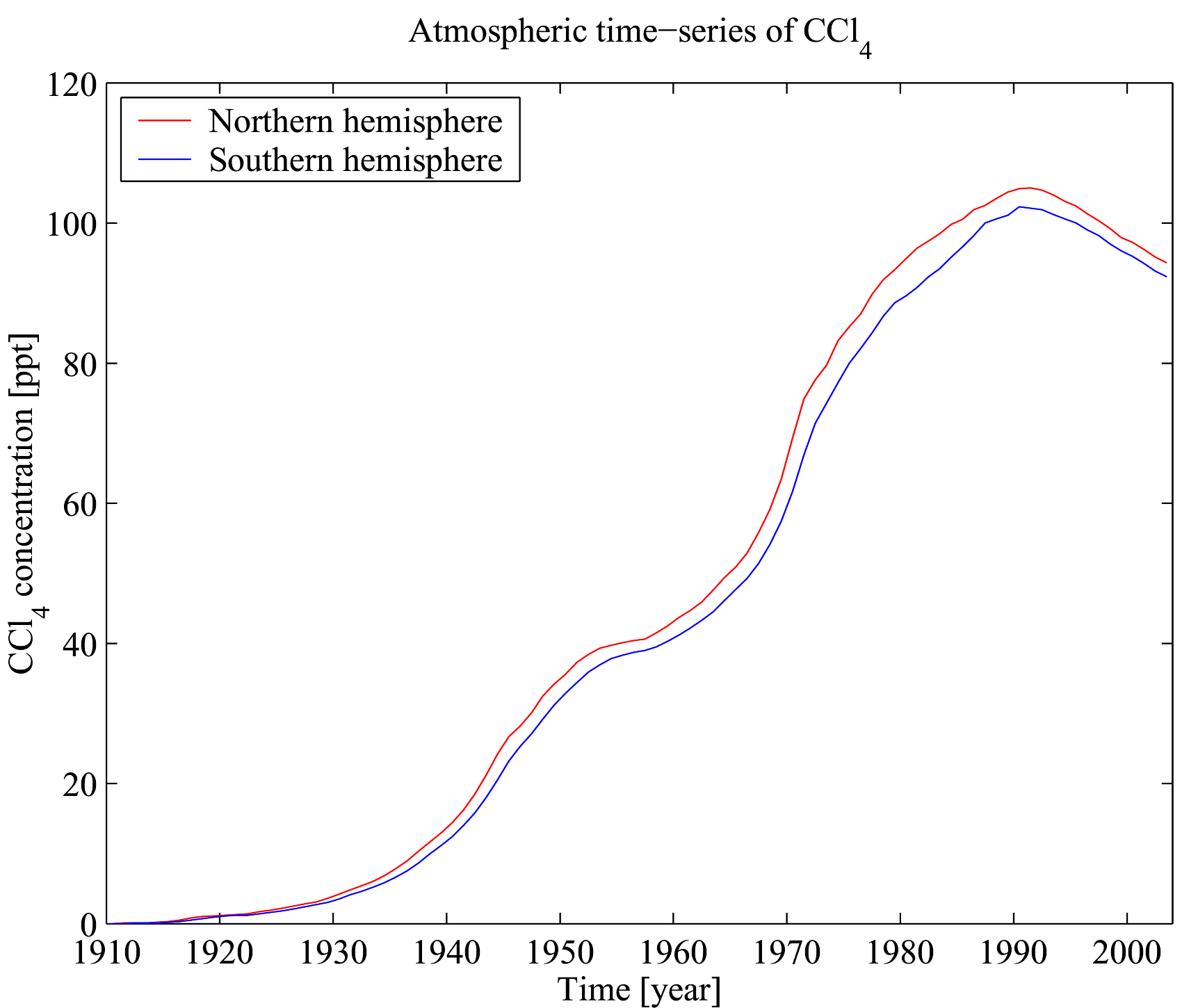
Time-series of atmospheric concentrations of CCl_{4} (Walker et al., 2000).
