= John Holmstrom =

American underground cartoonist and writer

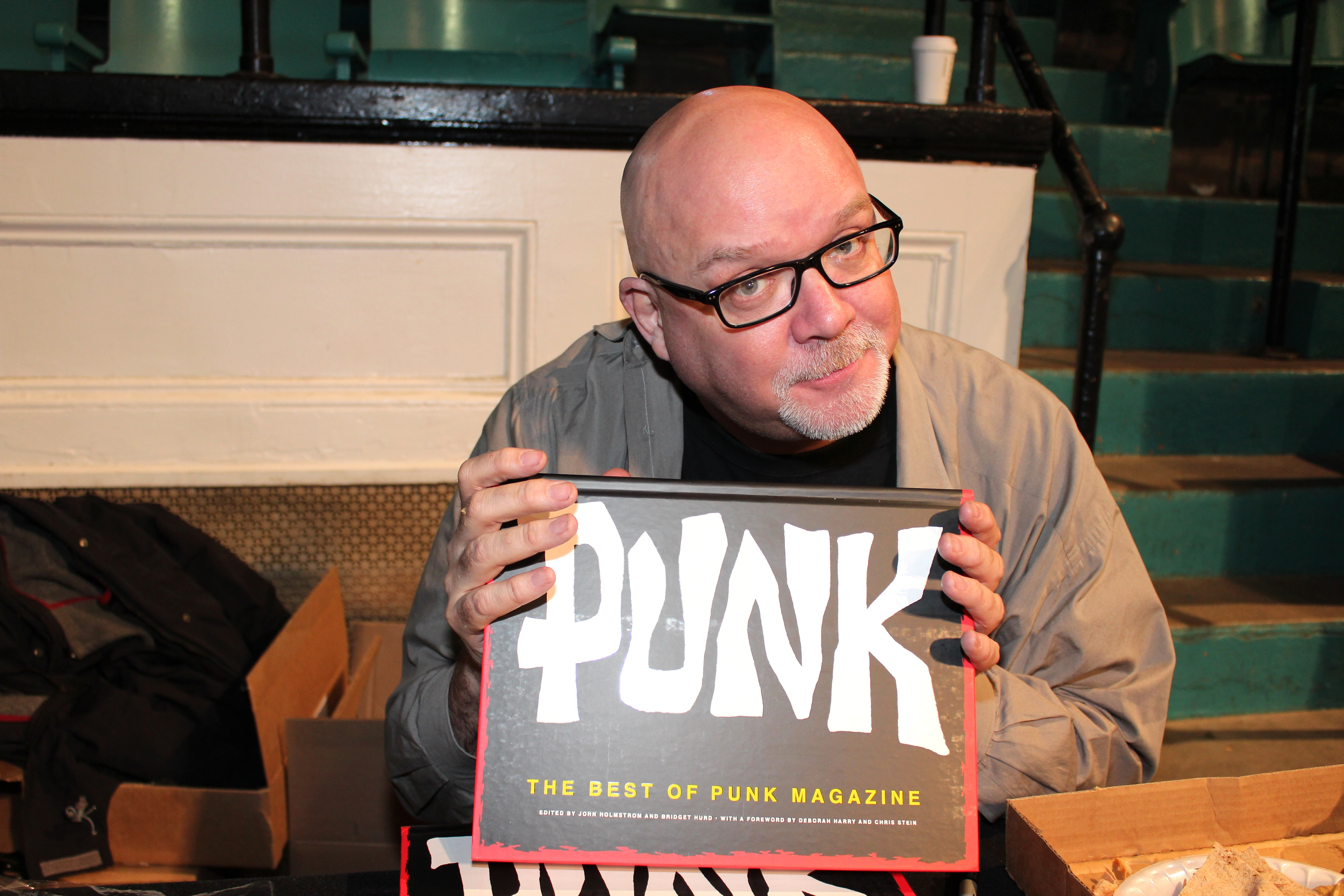
Holmstrom in 2013

John Holmstrom (born 1954) is an American underground cartoonist and writer. He is best known for illustrating the cover of the Ramones album Road to Ruin, and the innersleeve of the album Rocket to Russia, as well as his characters Bosko and Joe (published in Scholastic's Bananas magazine from 1975 to 1984).

At age 21, Holmstrom was the founding editor of Punk Magazine. After Punk ceased publication in 1979, he worked for several publications, including The Village Voice, Video Games magazine, K-Power, and Heavy Metal.

In 1986, Holmstrom contributed a comic-based chronology of punk rock for Spin magazine's special punk issue. In 1987, Holmstrom began to work for High Times magazine as Managing Editor, was soon promoted to Executive Editor, and in 1991 was promoted to Publisher and President. In 1996 he stepped aside to launch the High Times website.

He left High Times in 2000, and went on to work on other projects. He relaunched Punk for a few issues (before the events of 9/11 ended it), published a Bosko comic book, and got involved in several Japanese clothing deals. He was quoted in a September 2007 New York Times article about the CBGB.

== Acting ==
Holmstrom has appeared in the films School for Vandals, End of the Century: The Story of the Ramones, and Loren Cass.
