= Carbon tetrachloride (data page) =

Chemical data page

This page provides supplementary chemical data on carbon tetrachloride.

== Material Safety Data Sheet ==
The handling of this chemical may incur notable safety precautions. It is highly recommend that you seek the Material Safety Datasheet (MSDS) for this chemical from a reliable source such as SIRI, and follow its directions. MSDS for carbon tetrachloride is available at Fisher Scientific.

== Structure and properties ==
Structure and properties
Index of refraction, n_{D}	1.460
Abbe number	?
Dielectric constant, ε_{r}	2.2379 ε_{0} at 20 °C
Bond strength	?
Bond length	175pm
Bond angle	109.5° Cl–C–Cl
Magnetic susceptibility	?
Surface tension	28.0 dyn/cm at 10 °C; 26.8 dyn/cm at 20 °C; 22.2 dyn/cm at 75 °C
Viscosity	0.9578 mPa·s at 21 °C; 0.901 mPa·s at 25 °C; 0.7928 mPa·s at 35 °C; 0.4056 mPa·s at 99 °C
Thermal conductivity (units of W m^{−1} K^{−1})	0.1093 at 270 K 0.1074 at 280 K 0.1055 at 290 K 0.1036 at 300 K 0.1017 at 310 K 0.0997 at 320 K

== Thermodynamic properties ==
Phase behavior
Triple point	249 K (–24 °C), ? Pa
Critical point	556.4 K (283.3 °C), 4493 kPa, 3.625 mol.dm^{−3}
Std enthalpy change of fusion, Δ_{fus}H^{~~o~~}	2.52 kJ/mol
Std entropy change of fusion, Δ_{fus}S^{~~o~~}	10.1 J/(mol·K)
Std enthalpy change of vaporization, Δ_{vap}H^{~~o~~}	32.54 kJ/mol
Std entropy change of vaporization, Δ_{vap}S^{~~o~~}	92.82 J/(mol·K) at 76 °C
Solid properties
Std enthalpy change of formation, Δ_{f}H^{~~o~~}_{solid}	? kJ/mol
Standard molar entropy, S^{~~o~~}_{solid}	? J/(mol K)
Heat capacity, c_{p}	44.22 J/(mol K) at -227 °C (46 K)
Liquid properties
Std enthalpy change of formation, Δ_{f}H^{~~o~~}_{liquid}	–128.4 kJ/mol
Standard molar entropy, S^{~~o~~}_{liquid}	214.39 J/(mol K)
Enthalpy of combustion, Δ_{c}H^{~~o~~}	–359.9 kJ/mol
Heat capacity, c_{p}	131.3 J/(mol K)
Gas properties
Std enthalpy change of formation, Δ_{f}H^{~~o~~}_{gas}	–95.98 kJ/mol
Standard molar entropy, S^{~~o~~}_{gas}	309.65 J/(mol K)
Heat capacity, c_{p}	82.65 J/(mol K)
van der Waals' constants	a = 2066 L^{2} kPa/mol^{2} b = 0.1383 liter per mole

== Vapor pressure of liquid ==
P in mm Hg	1	10	40	100	400	760	1520	3800	7600	15200	30400	45600
T in °C	–50.0_{(s)}	–19.6	4.3	23.0	57.8	76.7	102.0	141.7	178.0	222.0	276.0	—

Table data obtained from CRC Handbook of Chemistry and Physics 47th ed. Note that "(s)" annotation indicates equilibrium temperature of vapor over solid. Otherwise the temperature is equilibrium of vapor over liquid.

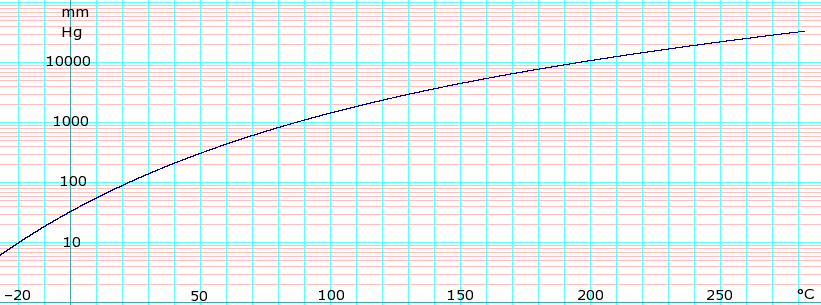
log_{10} of Carbon tetrachloride vapor pressure. Uses formula: $\scriptstyle \log_e P_{mmHg} =$$\scriptstyle \log_e (\frac{760}{101.325}) - 9.113968 \log_e(T+273.15) - \frac {6263.383}{T+273.15} + 74.99482 + 7.411446 \times 10^{-06} (T+273.15)^2$ obtained from CHERIC

== Distillation data ==
Vapor-liquid Equilibrium for Carbon tetrachloride/n-hexane P = 760 mmHg
BP Temp. °C	% by mole CCl_{4}
BP Temp. °C	liquid	vapor
68.8	2.6	2.3
68.9	8.1	7.1
69.0	14.0	12.5
69.2	20.3	17.9
69.4	26.4	23.3
69.6	32.5	28.6
69.9	38.5	33.8
70.3	44.8	39.4
70.7	50.9	44.8
70.7	51.6	45.5
71.1	57.0	50.5
71.6	63.1	56.2
72.2	69.1	62.2
72.9	74.8	68.1
73.6	80.7	74.5
74.4	86.5	81.2
75.4	92.5	88.8
76.4	98.2	97.2

Vapor-liquid Equilibrium for Carbon tetrachloride/benzene P = 760 mmHg
BP Temp. °C	% by mole CCl_{4}
BP Temp. °C	liquid	vapor
79.9	2.1	2.5
79.7	6.1	7.2
79.2	12.4	14.4
78.8	18.8	21.3
78.5	25.1	28.1
78.1	31.3	34.4
77.8	37.6	40.7
77.6	43.9	46.7
77.3	49.5	52.0
77.3	50.1	52.5
77.1	55.9	58.2
77.0	62.2	64.1
76.8	68.6	70.1
76.7	75.1	76.0
76.7	81.5	82.0
76.7	87.8	88.1
76.7	93.9	94.1
76.7	97.8	97.9

Vapor-liquid Equilibrium for Carbon tetrachloride/acetone P = 760 mmHg
BP Temp. °C	% by mole acetone
BP Temp. °C	liquid	vapor
76.74	0.00	0.00
70.80	5.90	20.25
68.74	8.70	27.10
64.45	17.90	40.75
61.91	26.40	48.95
59.83	37.40	56.55
58.74	45.10	61.25
57.94	52.55	65.50
57.18	61.65	70.65
56.67	69.60	75.60
56.36	76.20	79.85
56.15	82.95	84.60
56.01	89.50	89.80
56.02	91.40	91.50
55.99	95.30	95.20
56.08	100.00	100.00

== Spectral data ==
UV-Vis
λ_{max}	? nm
Extinction coefficient, ε	?
IR
Major absorption bands	? cm^{−1}
NMR
Proton NMR
Carbon-13 NMR
Other NMR data
MS
Masses of main fragments
