= Rocket to Russia =

Studio album by the Ramones
- Released: November 4, 1977
- Recorded: April, August–September 1977
- Studios: Mediasound and Sundragon, New York
- Genres: Punk rock; pop punk; surf punk
- Length: 31:46
- Label: Sire
- Producers: Tony Bongiovi; T. Erdelyi

Ramones chronology
Leave Home (1977)	Rocket to Russia (1977)	Road to Ruin (1978)

Singles from Rocket to Russia
- 1. "Sheena Is a Punk Rocker" Released: May 1977; 2. "Rockaway Beach" Released: November 1977; 3. "Do You Wanna Dance?" Released: March 1978

Rocket to Russia is the third studio album by the American punk rock band Ramones, released on November 4, 1977, through Sire Records. It is the band's last album to feature original drummer Tommy Ramone, who left the band in 1978 to focus on production. The album's origins date back to the summer of 1977, when "Sheena Is a Punk Rocker" was released as a single. That summer was known as the peak of the punk rock genre since many punk bands were offered recording contracts. The album's recording began in August 1977, and the band had a considerably larger budget with Sire allowing them between $25,000 and $30,000; much of this money went toward the album's production rather than recording.

The album's cover art was directed by John Gillespie. John Holmstrom and guitarist Johnny Ramone both worked on illustration, with the entire back cover contemplating a military theme, while the inner sleeve artwork depicted many of the themes portrayed in songs. The subject matter of songs varied throughout the album, though nearly all the tracks on the album incorporated humor into the lyrics. The musical style showed more of a surf rock influence, and many songs had minimal structuring.

The album received positive reviews, with many critics appreciating the matured production and sound quality as compared to Rocket to Russia's predecessors. Music critic Stephen Thomas Erlewine called it his favorite Ramones album as it contained several hooks and featured more variety of tempos. The album was not as commercially successful as the band had hoped, peaking at number 49 on the Billboard 200. Band members blamed the Sex Pistols for their lack of sales, saying that they changed the punk image for the worse. The album was ranked at number 106 in Rolling Stone's "500 Greatest Albums of All Time" in 2012, and was ranked number 385 in the 2020 edition.

== Background ==
In the summer of 1977, the single "Sheena Is a Punk Rocker" was released shortly after the release of the band's second album, Leave Home. This period was extremely significant to the punk rock genre, as it was the initial wave of New York City's underground punk bands receiving recording contracts. New York-based clubs CBGB and Max's Kansas City began to see bigger audiences crowd in to hear these bands. Punk fans commonly believed that this musical style would soon top the market, to which author Tom Carson explains: "To be in New York that summer was to have some sense of what it might have been like to live in San Francisco in 1966 or '67, or in London when the Beatles and the [Rolling] Stones first hit."

== Recording and production ==
Sire Records allowed the band between $25,000 and $30,000 to fully record and produce the album, which is a considerably larger budget compared to the band's previous albums. The band spent most of the money Sire had given them on the album's production value. The studio rent was $150 per hour, usually using the first take of a song as its final recording. Johnny explained that "it's best to do it quickly ... You do not wanna sit there and bullshit. It's your money they're spending."

The recording began on August 21, 1977, and took place in Midtown Manhattan at Mediasound Studios, in a former Episcopalian Church. On the first day of sessions, guitarist Johnny Ramone brought a copy of the Sex Pistols' single "God Save the Queen" with him, remarking that their type of music "robbed" the band. He emphasized that the album's sound engineer Ed Stasium needed to incorporate better production than that of the Sex Pistols, to which Stasium replied "no problem". Johnny relates: "These guys ripped us off and I want to sound better than this."

Although the album cites Tony Bongiovi and Tommy Ramone (credited as T. Erdelyi) as the head producers, much of the album's production was done by Stasium; Johnny went so far as to insist that Bongiovi was "not even there" during the band's recording sessions. Rocket to Russia's final mastering was mainly done in Bongiovi's Power Station studio. Infamous record producer Phil Spector offered to fabricate Rocket to Russia, but the band declined, feeling as though the album would not be the same without Tommy and Bongiovi.

== Title and packaging ==
The back cover of Rocket to Russia has illustrations by John Holmstrom.

The album was released on November 4, 1977, under the name Rocket to Russia, although it had a working title of Get Well. John Gillespie directed the artwork on the album, and the cover photo was taken by Danny Fields. The photo was taken in Extra Place, an alley in East Village, Manhattan. Arturo Vega is credited as Artistic Coordinator, and Punk magazine editor John Holmstrom illustrated for the album. Holmstrom and Johnny collaborated on the back cover's concept, eventually conceiving a military theme with an anti-communist cartoon drawing. The back cover art depicts a "pinhead" riding a rocket from the United States to Russia. The drawing includes many landmarks which pertain to their global position, including The Empire State Building and Capitol Building, and Saint Basil's Cathedral in Moscow, along with highly stereotypical caricatures of certain ethnicities. The original artwork is now in the Rock and Roll Hall of Fame in Cleveland, Ohio. Cartoons on the inside sleeve illustrate each song's basic concept.

== Lyrics and composition ==
Compared to the band's previous albums, the songs from Rocket to Russia were more surf music and bubblegum pop influenced. But similar to their previous releases, the lyrics integrated humor, specifically black comedy with themes circling mental disorders and psychiatry.

"Sheena Is a Punk Rocker"
"Sheena Is a Punk Rocker", a song about a young female punk fan, was said by Joey's brother Mickey Leigh to have "handily summed up the spirit of the scene and put punk rock on the map.

The album opens with "Cretin Hop", which pays homage to Ramones fans, and was inspired by Cretin Avenue of St. Paul, Minnesota, named after former bishop Joseph Crétin. When the piece was performed at concerts, the band would pogo dance on stage. "Rockaway Beach" was written by bassist Dee Dee Ramone, and was inspired by the Beach Boys along with other surf music bands. The title refers to a neighborhood and beach in Queens which Dee Dee was a fan of, as confirmed by Tommy and Joey. "I Don't Care" is composed of three chords and features minimal text composition. The song is among the first pieces written by the band and was originally recorded as a demo that was released on the 2001 expanded edition of the Ramones debut album. "Sheena Is a Punk Rocker" was written by Joey, who explains that the lyrics are about a young female outsider named Sheena who strayed away from the popular disco and surf music and instead visited nightclubs and listened to punk rock. The mid-tempo song deviates from a three-chord pattern and starts off with Dee Dee shouting "Four!", which, according to engineer Ed Stasium, was the result of Dee Dee starting his iconic countdown before the tape started rolling. This is followed by guitar riffs deemed to have a "raucous" texture by author Tom Carson. The author also suggests that these chords "bump[ed]" into each other until the song's fade-out ending.

"We're a Happy Family" is a caricature of the conditions which 20th-century middle-class American families lived in. The song's lyrics depict a dysfunctional family where the father is a lying homosexual, the mother is addicted to prescription drugs, the infant has chills. The writing also tells of how the family are friends with the President of the United States and the Pope and indicate that the family sells "dope". The song fades out with various different lines taken from fake dialogue, which illustrate a side of Joey's personality according to his brother Mickey Leigh.

Side B of the album begins with "Teenage Lobotomy", which deals with the brain surgical operation lobotomy. The lyrics outline how this procedure can cause serious consequences to the brain, with the line "Gonna get my Ph.D, I'm a teenage lobotomy." The composition features more complex melodies than that of other songs from the album, with Stasium proclaiming it to be a "mini-Ramones Symphony". Rocket to Russia is the first Ramones album to feature two cover songs: "Do You Wanna Dance?" (originally performed by Bobby Freeman) and "Surfin' Bird" (originally performed by the Trashmen).

== Critical reception ==
Professional ratings
Review scores
Source	Rating
AllMusic	5/5 stars
The Austin Chronicle	5/5 stars
Christgau's Record Guide	A
Mojo	4/5 stars
NME	10/10
Record Collector	5/5 stars
The Rolling Stone Album Guide	5/5 stars
Slant Magazine	4.5/5 stars
Spin Alternative Record Guide	10/10
Uncut	5/5 stars

Rocket to Russia was well received by critics, and was often given a positive review. Many critics appreciated the band's progression of sound quality and production value, as opposed to the album's predecessors.

Critic Robert Christgau reaffirms that the album's content evolved significantly since previous releases. Writing in Christgau's Record Guide: Rock Albums of the Seventies (1981), he noted that the album had "something for everyone" and called it a "ready-made punk-rock classic". Rolling Stone critic Dave Marsh began his review of the album by stating: "Rocket to Russia is the best American rock & roll of the year and possibly the funniest rock album ever made." Like other critics, Marsh recognized the advanced sound quality, explaining that "the guitars still riff relentlessly, but they are freer within the murky sound, and the songs give them much more to work with."

John Rockwell of The New York Times deemed Rocket to Russia the band's best album "because the humor and the role-playing have become more overt than ever". The Los Angeles Times labeled it "an important breakthrough album", and praised the "inspired lunacy". UPI listed Rocket to Russia as the second best album of 1977, writing that the Ramones were "the undisputed kings of American Punk."

Stephen Thomas Erlewine, a music critic at AllMusic, said that the production "only gives the Ramones' music more force". He stated that although it lacks the revolutionary impact that their debut had, Rocket to Russia is the band's "most listenable and enjoyable album" because of its surplus of hooks and varying tempo.

== Commercial performance ==
Although the band expected the album to spawn a few hit songs, Rocket to Russia sold few records. The album charted on the US Billboard 200 at number 49, making this album one of the most successful of the Ramones' releases. It also debuted at number 31 on the Swedish charts, 36 on the Canadian charts, and 60 on the UK Albums Chart.

The lack of record sales was largely due to fellow punk band Sex Pistols turning people off the genre "with their antisocial behavior", as put by author Brian J. Bowe. Rock music historian Legs McNeil relates: "Safety pins, razor blades, chopped haircuts, snarling, vomiting—everything that had nothing to do with the Ramones was suddenly in vogue, and it killed any chance Rocket to Russia had of getting any airplay." Joey also insisted that the Sex Pistols were partially responsible for the low sale numbers, concluding that before 60 Minutes focused on the Sex Pistols, Rocket to Russia had decent airplay. After this, Joey asserted that "everyone flipped out and then things changed radically. It really kind of screwed things up for ourselves."

== Tommy's departure ==
Drummer Tommy, who had also worked to co-produce the album, was troubled by the lack of sales and began debating on continuing with the Ramones. He also considered touring to be "depressing", and that the audience at unfamiliar gigs were "a bunch of very eccentric, high-strung, crazy people, from one shit-hole club to another." The drummer left the band in 1978 but continued as producer on their next album Road to Ruin. He said:

I was thinking, 'What's best for the Ramones?' There was all this tension between me and Johnny. I was trying to release the pressure, to keep the band going. I told Dee Dee and Joey first that I was leaving the band. They said, 'Oh no, don't go, don't go, blah, blah, blah.' I told them we had to do something because I was losing my mind.

== Track listing ==
=== Original release ===
All tracks originally credited to the Ramones (except "Do You Wanna Dance?" and "Surfin' Bird"). Actual writers are listed alongside the tracks.

Side one
No.	Title	Writer(s)	Length
1.	"Cretin Hop"	Ramones	1:55
2.	"Rockaway Beach"	Dee Dee Ramone	2:06
3.	"Here Today, Gone Tomorrow"	Joey Ramone	2:47
4.	"Locket Love"	Dee Dee Ramone	2:09
5.	"I Don't Care"	Joey Ramone	1:38
6.	"Sheena Is a Punk Rocker"	Joey Ramone	2:49
7.	"We're a Happy Family"	Ramones	2:47

Side two
No.	Title	Writer(s)	Length
1.	"Teenage Lobotomy"	Ramones	2:00
2.	"Do You Wanna Dance?" (Bobby Freeman cover)	Bobby Freeman	1:52
3.	"I Wanna Be Well"	Joey Ramone	2:28
4.	"I Can't Give You Anything"	Dee Dee Ramone	1:57
5.	"Ramona"	Ramones	2:35
6.	"Surfin' Bird" (The Trashmen cover)	Carl White, Alfred Frazier, John Harris, Turner Wilson	2:37
7.	"Why Is It Always This Way?"	Ramones	2:32
Total length:			31:46

2001 expanded edition CD (Warner Archives/Rhino) bonus tracks
No.	Title	Writer(s)	Length
15.	"Needles & Pins" (early version)	Sonny Bono, Jack Nitzsche	2:24
16.	"Slug" (demo)	Joey Ramone	2:23
17.	"It's a Long Way Back to Germany" (UK B-side)	Dee Dee Ramone	2:22
18.	"I Don't Care" (single version)	Joey Ramone	1:40
19.	"Sheena Is a Punk Rocker" (single version)	Joey Ramone	2:48
Total length:			43:48

- Track 15 previously unissued.
- Track 16 produced and arranged by Dan Kessel and David Kessel. Recorded at Gold Star Studios, Los Angeles, December 1978. First issued on All the Stuff (And More) Volume Two (1991).

=== 2017 40th anniversary deluxe edition (Sire/Rhino) ===
Adapted from the album's liner notes.

Disc 1

Remastered original mixes

- Tracks 1–14 (original mixes) as per original album

40th anniversary tracking mix
No.	Title	Writer(s)	Length
15.	"Cretin Hop"	Ramones	1:55
16.	"Rockaway Beach"	Dee Dee Ramone	2:06
17.	"Here Today, Gone Tomorrow"	Joey Ramone	2:47
18.	"Locket Love"	Dee Dee Ramone	2:09
19.	"I Don't Care" (version 2)	Joey Ramone	1:38
20.	"It's a Long Way Back to Germany" (version 1)	Dee Dee Ramone	2:49
21.	"We're a Happy Family"	Ramones	2:47
22.	"Teenage Lobotomy"	Ramones	2:00
23.	"Do You Wanna Dance?"	Freeman	1:52
24.	"I Wanna Be Well"	Joey Ramone	2:28
25.	"I Can't Give You Anything"	Dee Dee Ramone	1:57
26.	"Ramona"	Ramones	2:35
27.	"Surfin' Bird"	White, Frazier, Harris, Wilson	2:37
28.	"Why Is It Always This Way?"	Ramones	2:32
Total length:			65:46

- Tracks 15–28 mixed by Ed Stasium at Eight Palms Ranchero, Poway, California, 2017.

Disc 2

Mediasound/Power Station rough mixes
No.	Title	Writer(s)	Length
1.	"Why Is It Always This Way?" (Mediasound rough, alternate lyrics)	Ramones	1:58
2.	"Rockaway Beach" (Power Station Rough)	Dee Dee Ramone	2:06
3.	"I Wanna Be Well" (Power Station rough)	Joey Ramone	2:28
4.	"Locket Love" (Power Station rough)	Dee Dee Ramone	2:15
5.	"I Can't Give You Anything" (Power Station rough)	Dee Dee Ramone	2:02
6.	"Cretin Hop" (Power Station rough)	Ramones	1:55
7.	"We're a Happy Family" (Power Station rough)	Ramones	2:14
8.	"Ramona" (Mediasound rough, alternate lyrics)	Ramones	3:06
9.	"Do You Wanna Dance?" (Mediasound rough)	Freeman	1:52
10.	"Teenage Lobotomy" (Mediasound rough)	Ramones	2:02
11.	"Here Today, Gone Tomorrow" (Mediasound rough)	Joey Ramone	2:47
12.	"I Don't Care" (version 2, Mediasound rough)	Joey Ramone	1:46

40th anniversary extras
No.	Title	Writer(s)	Length
13.	"Here Today, Gone Tomorrow" (acoustic version)	Joey Ramone	2:48
14.	"It's a Long Way Back to Germany" (version 1, Dee Dee vocal)	Dee Dee Ramone	2:24
15.	"Ramona" (Sweet Little Ramona Pop Mix)	Ramones	3:07
16.	"Surfin' Bird" (alternate vocal)	White, Frazier, Harris, Wilson	2:40
17.	"Teenage Lobotomy" (backing track)	Ramones	2:06
18.	"We're a Happy Family" (at home with the family)	Ramones	1:02
19.	"Cretin Hop" (backing track)	Ramones	1:58
20.	"Needles and Pins" (demo version)	Bono, Nitzsche	2:44
21.	"Babysitter" (B-Side version, remastered)	Ramones	2:45
22.	"It's a Long Way Back to Germany" (B-Side version, remastered)	Dee Dee Ramone	2:21
23.	"Joey RTR radio spot promo"		0:52
24.	"We're a Happy Family" (Joey and Dee Dee dialogue)	Ramones	1:12
Total length:			52:45

- Tracks 1–12 mixed by Ed Stasium at Mediasound and the Power Station, New York, 1977.
- Tracks 13–19 and 24 mixed by Ed Stasium, 2017.
- Track 21 produced by Tony Bongiovi and T. Erdelyi, engineered by Ed Stasium. Recorded at Sundragon, New York, 1976. Mixed by Ed Stasium at Mediasound, New York, 1977.
- Track 22 produced by Tony Bongiovi and T. Erdelyi, engineered by Ed Stasium, assisted by Don Berman. Recorded at Mediasound, New York, 1977. Mixed by Ed Stasium.
- Track 23: Joey's voice recorded at Sire Records' basement studio, October 1977.
- All tracks, except 21 and 22, previously unissued.

Disc 3

Live at Apollo Centre, Glasgow, Scotland (December 19, 1977)
No.	Title	Writer(s)	Length
1.	"Rockaway Beach" (live)	Dee Dee Ramone	3:00
2.	"Teenage Lobotomy" (live)	Ramones	2:08
3.	"Blitzkrieg Bop" (live)	Tommy Ramone, Dee Dee Ramone	2:03
4.	"I Wanna Be Well" (live)	Joey Ramone	2:21
5.	"Glad to See You Go" (live)	Joey Ramone, Dee Dee Ramone	1:51
6.	"Gimme Gimme Shock Treatment" (live)	Dee Dee Ramone, Johnny Ramone	1:37
7.	"You're Gonna Kill That Girl" (live)	Joey Ramone	2:27
8.	"I Don't Care" (live)	Joey Ramone	1:40
9.	"Sheena Is a Punk Rocker" (live)	Joey Ramone	2:26
10.	"Carbona Not Glue" (live)	Ramones	1:34
11.	"Commando" (live)	Dee Dee Ramone, Johnny Ramone	1:58
12.	"Here Today, Gone Tomorrow" (live)	Joey Ramone	3:14
13.	"Surfin' Bird" (live)	White, Frazier, Harris, Wilson	2:23
14.	"Cretin Hop" (live)	Ramones	1:45
15.	"Listen to My Heart" (live)	Dee Dee Ramone	1:38
16.	"California Sun" (live)	Henry Glover, Morris Levy	1:48
17.	"I Don't Wanna Walk Around With You" (live)	Dee Dee Ramone	1:24
18.	"Pinhead" (live)	Ramones	3:47
19.	"Do You Wanna Dance?" (live)	Freeman	1:41
20.	"Chain Saw" (live)	Joey Ramone	1:31
21.	"Today Your Love, Tomorrow the World" (live)	Dee Dee Ramone	3:25
22.	"Now I Wanna Be a Good Boy" (live)	Dee Dee Ramone	2:03
23.	"Judy Is a Punk" (live)	Joey Ramone	1:15
24.	"Now I Wanna Sniff Some Glue" (live)	Dee Dee Ramone	1:22
25.	"We're a Happy Family" (live)	Ramones	2:26
Total length:			53:03

- Recorded by the Basing Street Studios Mobile. Engineered by Frank Owen, assisted by Greg Cobb. Mixed by Ed Stasium at Eight Palms Ranch, Poway, California, 2017.

LP

40th anniversary tracking mix

- Track listing as disc 1, tracks 15–28

== Personnel ==
Adapted from AllMusic and the album's liner notes, except where noted.

Ramones

- Joey Ramone – lead vocals
- Johnny Ramone – guitar
- Dee Dee Ramone – bass guitar, backing vocals
- Tommy Ramone – drums

Additional musicians

- Ed Stasium – additional guitar, backing vocals
- Kathie Baillie – backing vocals on "Sheena Is a Punk Rocker"
- Alan LeBoeuf – backing vocals on "Sheena Is a Punk Rocker"
- Michael Bonagura – backing vocals on "Sheena Is a Punk Rocker"

Production

- Tony Bongiovi – producer
- Tommy Ramone – producer (credited as T. Erdelyi)
- Ed Stasium – engineer, mixing
- Don Berman – assistant engineer
- Greg Calbi – mastering
- Danny Fields – photography (front cover)
- John Gillespie – art direction
- John Holmstrom – artwork (back cover and inside drawings)
- Arturo Vega – artistic coordination

== Charts ==
Chart (1977–1978)	Peak position
Australian Albums (Kent Music Report)	79
Canada Top Albums/CDs (RPM)	36
Finnish Albums (The Official Finnish Charts)	11
Swedish Albums (Sverigetopplistan)	31
UK Albums (Official Charts)	60
US Billboard 200	49

== Certifications ==
Region	Certification	Certified units/sales
United Kingdom (BPI)	Silver	60,000^{‡}
^{‡} Sales+streaming figures based on certification alone.
