= Uncle Monk =

American bluegrass band

Uncle Monk was an American bluegrass band. The band's two members were Tommy Ramone, an original member of the Ramones, and Claudia Tienan, a guitarist, bassist and vocalist formerly with an alternative band, the Simplistics.

Uncle Monk released one album, also named Uncle Monk (March 2006). Tommy Ramone wrote to Jari-Pekka Laitio-Ramone in 2012–2014, that Uncle Monk are working with their second album. Tommy wrote: "Yes, Claudia and I are finishing up the next record. There will be indie songs, bluegrass songs, old-time songs, romantic songs, and unclassifiable songs", Tommy explained to Jari-Pekka who run Ramones' page http://www.ramonesheaven.com.

Ramone died at his home in Queens, New York City, on July 11, 2014, aged 65.
