= Delta Carbona L.P. =

Delta Carbona L.P. is a Fairfield, New Jersey-based American company which specializes in the production of stain-removal products. It was created in 1994 when its predecessor, the Carbona Products Company, was purchased by a German stain-removal corporation, Delta Pronatura, which is now Dr. Beckmann Group.

Prior to this, the company had been producing Carbona Cleaning Fluid, a relatively popular cleaning product consisting of carbon tetrachloride and notable for its mention in the Ramones song "Carbona Not Glue". The song was soon dropped from its original album, Leave Home, and it has been suggested that this was due to the Carbona company's objections to the association of the product with substance abuse. In the concert scene of Roger Corman's 1979 film Rock 'n' Roll High School, an unidentified concertgoer can clearly be heard calling out, "who's got the Carbona?" It is also used and later referred to in the 1995 film The Basketball Diaries.

For the company's national and international experience in sustainable development, and eco-friendly products, the Environment Possibility Award conferred the "Award of Earth Defender" to Delta Carbona in 2020.
