= Carbona Not Glue =

- 1991 US 7" single cover

Single by Ramones

from the album Leave Home
- Released: January 10, 1977
- Recorded: October 1976
- Genre: Punk rock
- Length: 1:56
- Label: Sire/Philips
- Songwriter: Ramones
- Producers: Tony Bongiovi, Tommy Ramone

Ramones singles chronology
"I Wanna Be Your Boyfriend" (1976)	"Carbona Not Glue" (1977)	"Sheena Is a Punk Rocker" (1977)

"Carbona Not Glue" is a song by the Ramones from their second album, Leave Home (1977).

== Story ==
"Carbona Not Glue" is a follow-up to "Now I Wanna Sniff Some Glue", a song that appeared on their first album. The band sarcastically suggested that the high obtained from sniffing Carbona cleaning solvent (carbon tetrachloride) was more pleasurable than that of airplane glue. In the hardcover book included in some versions of Hey! Ho! Let's Go: The Anthology, Tommy Ramone says, "Something like 'Carbona Not Glue' has to be tongue-in-cheek. It's absurd, like saying that you should try something more poisonous." It was featured prominently in the graphic novel Ghost World by Dan Clowes.

== Controversy ==
The original release of Leave Home included "Carbona Not Glue" as the fifth track on the album. However, the song was deleted from the album to avoid a potential lawsuit, as Carbona was a corporate trademark. The album was re-released with the outtake "Babysitter", which was also released as the B-side of "Do You Wanna Dance?", in its place. On the British version, "Babysitter" is not listed on the back cover or inner sleeve, but it is listed on the label. Most collectors believe that the "Babysitter" version is rarer than the "Carbona" version.

When Sire Records suddenly switched distributors from ABC Records to Warner Bros. Records (who had bought the label), yet another version of the album was released, with "Babysitter" being replaced by "Sheena Is a Punk Rocker", then a non-LP single already planned to be on the next Ramones album in a different mix.

"Carbona Not Glue" was restored to its original position in the running order for the 2001 expanded edition of Leave Home, and the deluxe 40th anniversary edition included additional mixes of the track.

== See also ==
- Ramones discography
- Songs about drug use
