= Leave Home =

Studio album by the Ramones
- Released: January 10, 1977
- Recorded: October–November 1976
- Studios: Sundragon, New York City
- Genres: Punk rock; rock and roll
- Length: 29:57
- Label: Sire
- Producers: Tony Bongiovi; T. Erdelyi

Ramones chronology
Ramones (1976)	Leave Home (1977)	Rocket to Russia (1977)

Singles from Leave Home
- 1. "Swallow My Pride" Released: February 1977; 2. "I Remember You" Released: February 1977 (UK)

Leave Home is the second studio album by the American punk rock band Ramones. It was released on January 10, 1977, through Sire Records, with the expanded CD being released through Rhino Entertainment on June 19, 2001. The front photo was taken by Moshe Brakha and the back cover, which would become the band's logo, was designed by Arturo Vega. The album spawned three singles, but only one succeeded in charting. It was also promoted with several tour dates in the United States and Europe.

The songs in Leave Home concentrate on various themes, with the musical tones being diverse as well. Some tunes were more pop-oriented, while others, like "Gimme Gimme Shock Treatment" and "Pinhead" were loaded with distorted guitars and had a more punk rock sound. The song "Carbona Not Glue" was taken off the album because it potentially violated the trademark of the stain-removal product Carbona. The track was replaced with "Babysitter" in the United Kingdom and "Sheena Is a Punk Rocker" in the United States (prior to its inclusion on Rocket to Russia); both "Carbona" and "Babysitter" were included on the 2001 expanded edition.

Critical reception for the album was generally favorable, with several reviewers pointing out the fact that it highly resembled the band's debut album. Critics also said the album was less groundbreaking than their debut but had humorous and enjoyable pieces. The album peaked at 148 on the Billboard 200 despite its critical acclaim as well as the band members expecting more commercial success.

== Background ==
The writing and structure are both somewhat more sophisticated than the songs on their previous record. Guitarist Johnny Ramone relates: "We recorded them in the order they were written; we wanted to show a slight progression in song structure." Most of the songs were written in the band members' homes, rather than at a studio; "Suzy Is a Headbanger" was written in drummer Tommy Ramone's loft apartment. Joey Ramone later recalled:

I wrote most of the stuff I contributed at my apartment in Forest Hills before I left and moved back to a place in the city. I had no amp at home, just an electric guitar. I recorded it onto a cassette and played that back at rehearsal. We had better production, we were playing a little faster, and we had a lot of songs accumulated. We were in really good shape for that album.

Recorded October and November 1976 in New York City at Sundragon Studios through Sire Records, Leave Home featured increased sound quality through more advanced output methods. Sire set their budget at about $10,000 ($56,000 in 2025), hiring Tony Bongiovi to produce the album, and Tommy Ramone (credited as T. Erdelyi) to co-produce. More emphasis was placed on the album's mixing and engineering than their debut album, which received merely $6,400 ($35,970 in 2025) to record and produce. With a more fine-tuned and exceptional sound, Leave Home also presented a production value superior to other punk rock bands at the time. Author Joe S. Harrington called the band's production "brilliant", and noted that it "put them ahead of the run-of-the-mill garage band."

The title Leave Home refers to the Ramones' leaving New York City to go on tour around the world. The album cover was designed by Moshe Brakha, who had worked with the Rolling Stones to yield the Black and Blue (1976) cover art, and would later work with artists like Devo and Iron Maiden. The back cover of the album was a drawing of a bald eagle by graphic designer Arturo Vega. The image would soon become the band's logo.

=== Carbona controversy ===
The original release included "Carbona Not Glue" as the fifth track. However, a month before the band released Leave Home, Ramones' manager Danny Fields announced to the band that Carbona was a registered trademark and that their record label had to remove the song from the album's track listing. Legs McNeil recalled: "I was shocked. It was such a great song, so radio-friendly—like a song the Beatles or the Rolling Stones would have written if they were just starting out in 1976, with great harmonies and catchy lyrics." Although early purchasers of the Sire release got an album that included the song, "Carbona Not Glue" was later replaced by "Sheena Is a Punk Rocker" for the US release, and "Babysitter" for the UK release. In the early ‘90s, after being unavailable for years, the song was bootlegged as a 45 RPM single with "I Can't Be" as the B-side. The single's cover sported a faux Sub Pop Singles design, despite not actually being released by the label. The song was revived on the 2001 Extended Edition of the album, which also included "Babysitter".

== Promotion ==
There were three singles released from Leave Home: "I Remember You", "Swallow My Pride", and "Carbona Not Glue". "Swallow My Pride" was the only single from Leave Home that charted, peaking at thirty-six on the United Kingdom singles chart. The album's final single, "Carbona Not Glue"/"I Can't Be", was released in 1991 as a bootleg. The single was given four out of five stars by AllMusic's Matt Whalley, who said that the song "could have been one of the Ramones' most popular tracks if it was not pulled from the album for legal reasons." Whalley called the B-side "I Can't Be" "simple", describing it as "in the same vein as 'Carbona Not Glue,' only shifting focus to relationships."

After the album came out in February, the band began a four-week tour of the United States starting with Los Angeles. On February 4, the band played at the Nassau Coliseum with Blue Öyster Cult, and played with Suicide the next day at CBGB. A week after this, the band played with Blue Öyster Cult again in Poughkeepsie, to which Johnny relates: "Those arena shows were a little better for us, although we would have more bad experiences in those big places. I never really enjoyed playing them." The band used their newly designed logo as a backdrop at concerts. They also had more advanced lighting techniques, but still only used white lights.

In April 1977, the band left the United States to begin their tour of Europe. Ramones co-headlined with Talking Heads, who were a new wave band formed in 1975. During a Marseille gig, the Ramones caused a power outage to a quarter of the city during a sound check. The gig was cancelled when police arrived and dispersed the fans. When their tour manager arranged for a stop at Stonehenge in Wiltshire, Johnny refused to leave the bus, saying he refused to see "a bunch of old rocks". The band's Europe tour came to an end on June 6, 1977.

== Composition ==
Leave Home has various lyrical themes throughout its track list. The opening song, "Glad to See You Go", is rather uptempo and frenetic. The track was about Dee Dee's then-girlfriend Connie, who was well known in the punk rock scene as having once dated New York Dolls bassist Arthur Kane and attempting to cut his finger off with a knife. Connie also harmed Dee Dee in several ways, such as slicing his buttocks with a beer bottle. At the time, every other member of the band despised Dee Dee's girlfriend and he eventually broke up with her. Joey recalls: "Dee [Dee] and I came up with the song 'Glad to See You Go,' about Connie's leaving." In the mid-1980s, Connie died from a drug overdose. "Gimme Gimme Shock Treatment" utilizes Joey's singing abilities with its vocal-demanding melody. Author Scott Schinder called the song a "sing-along mental-illness ode". The next song, "I Remember You", was said by author Greil Marcus to be all about the moment where "Joey's voice turns the single word 'you' into pure poetry." "Oh, Oh, I Love Her So" pays homage to the 1950s doo-wop genre, and consists of a three-chord barrage. The song was written solely by Joey, where in the song he humorously tells of how he met a girl at Burger King and they fell in love by a soda machine.

"Carbona Not Glue" was written as a follow-up to "Now I Wanna Sniff Some Glue" from their debut album. The song was Legs McNeil's favorite song from Leave Home, who relates: "[The song] was meant to clarify that while glue might not be good for you, the cleaning fluid Carbona was definitely a better high." The song contemplates around Beach Boys harmonies, and it uses "bouncy" guitar riffs. "Suzy Is a Headbanger" was inspired by the 1947 film noir Nightmare Alley, with the lyrics detailing a female involved in the punk rock scene.

"Pinhead"
The song "Pinhead" begins with a chant "Gabba gabba we accept you, we accept you, one of us." Tommy Ramone explained that the song was about how "all the freaks were welcome to join the Ramones. It was our way of goofing on the media, for saying we were not too bright."

The lines "Gabba Gabba Hey" at the end of "Pinhead" were taken from the horror film Freaks, which the band saw in Cleveland, Ohio after their gig was cancelled. Joey's brother Mickey Leigh said that it was specifically taken from the scene where "the midget groom does a dance on the banquet table and sings 'Gobble gobble, we accept you, one of us' to his bride." The song is an audience participation song, and during live performances, Leigh appears on stage holding a sign that bore the text "Gabba Gabba Hey". "Pinhead", the album's longest piece, leads into "Now I Wanna Be a Good Boy", which portrays a confused adolescent wanting to be good, yet also yearning to run away from home. The next song on the album, "Swallow My Pride", was a piece written solely by lead singer Joey Ramone, who states that the concept deals with their record company Sire Records; Tommy used the expression "you gotta swallow your pride" when signing to their record company. Record World said of "Swallow My Pride" that the Ramones "pack more energy into a two minute song than just about anyone else." "What's Your Game" is one of the band's most melodic songs and was called "wistful" by Marcus. It was written by Joey about how he yearns for a girl to be herself instead of something she's not.

The album's only cover song, "California Sun", was written by Henry Glover and Morris Levy, and originally recorded by The Rivieras. While the lyrics and musical structure remain the same throughout the piece, Joey's pronunciation upon words significantly lessened the similarity to the original song. The sound output tone also differs from the original, with more distortion as well as a faster tempo. Author Steve Waksman relates: "From the opening bars, 'California Sun' becomes subject to the Ramones' distinctive brand of musical minimalism paired with sonic excess. The chords go by in a blur of distortion; the drums and bass kick at seemingly twice the speed of the Rivieras." The twelfth track "Commando" has a theme which deals with war movies and contains multiple military references. Author Avram Mednick said the song was a successor to "Blitzkrieg Bop", released on the band's debut album. He also noted that it has a "bouncy melody and an infectious call-and-response chorus." "You're Gonna Kill that Girl", which was written very early in the band's career, was also rooted in doo-wop genre. Mednick commented that it appealed highly to those tuning into the Ramones in the UK, and also said it has a "lovely misogynistic tune." The final guitar chord on the track is played by drummer Tommy since Johnny rarely played acoustic. The album's final track, "You Should Never Have Opened That Door", was written by Dee Dee and Johnny, and circles themes of horror films and hints that people in these movies tend to be naïve and unintelligent.

== Critical reception ==
Professional ratings
Review scores
Source	Rating
AllMusic	4.5/5 stars
The Austin Chronicle	5/5 stars
Christgau's Record Guide	A
NME	10/10
Pitchfork	9.5/10
Q	4/5 stars
Record Collector	4/5 stars
The Rolling Stone Album Guide	4.5/5 stars
Spin Alternative Record Guide	9/10
Uncut	5/5 stars

Leave Home was released on January 10, 1977, and was well received by critics. Although the album did not receive much initial reception, Ken Tucker of Rolling Stone gave the album a favorable review in 1977, saying that it is very similar to their debut yet more experienced sounding. He sums up the album with: "The Ramones are as direct and witty as before. They've also lost just a pinch of their studied rawness: whether this is a sign of maturity or sellout is a matter for debate. The Ramones make rousing music and damn good jokes, but they're in a bind: the hard rock of this group is so pure it may be perceived as a freak novelty by an awful lot of people." The Los Angeles Times deemed the songs of Leave Home "two-minute metal operettas for the Blank Generation." In Christgau's Record Guide: Rock Albums of the Seventies (1981), Robert Christgau wrote, "People who consider this a one-joke band aren't going to change their minds now. People who love the joke for its power, wit, and economy will be happy to hear it twice. Hint: read the lyrics." The year-end critics' poll at NME ranked it at No. 9 among the top "Albums of the Year" for 1977, with "Sheena" ranked at No. 5 among the year's top tracks.

Retrospective reviews have also been positive. Writing for AllMusic, Stephen Thomas Erlewine found it very similar to their debut. Though he did consider it to be slightly more pop music oriented, Erlewine writes that despite being "weaker" than its preceding album, Leave Home "deliver[s] at breakneck speed and conclude[s] in under a half-hour." April Long from NME especially favored "Sheena Is a Punk Rocker", calling it "a punk-surf-pop crossover that has never been rivalled." It was given a favorable review by PopMatters editor Adrien Begrand, who called it his favorite Ramones album, saying: "In this album, the Ramones are witty, menacing, goofy, cynical, and head-over-heels in love, all at the same time." During his extensive review, he called "I Remember You" a "perfect bubblegum pop song", while saying that "Pinhead" urges "all the freaks of the world to unite as one" with the lines "D-U-M-B / Everyone's accusing me."

== Commercial performance ==
The album did not chart as well in the United States as its predecessor, peaking at number 148 on the Billboard 200. It was, however, the band's first album to chart on the UK Albums Chart, debuting at number 45. Many of the songs on Leave Home were not considered by Mickey Leigh to be "radio–friendly" because "Carbona Not Glue" was about Intoxicative inhalant. Joey relates: "We thought we had a lotta songs that should've been hits. If you grew up in the sixties, things would just get played and be hits right off the bat. So we thought since our music was doin' something unique that everyone would pick up on that. What really happened was we were so alien that no one wanted to touch us. And so we wouldn't get played."

== Track listing ==
All tracks originally credited to the Ramones (except "California Sun"). Actual writers are listed alongside the tracks. Writing credits are credited to Mickey Leigh's book I Slept with Joey Ramone: A Family Memoir.

=== Original release ===
Side one
No.	Title	Writer(s)	Length
1.	"Glad to See You Go"	Dee Dee Ramone, Joey Ramone	2:10
2.	"Gimme Gimme Shock Treatment"	Dee Dee Ramone, Johnny Ramone	1:38
3.	"I Remember You"	Joey Ramone	2:15
4.	"Oh Oh I Love Her So"	Joey Ramone	2:03
5.	"Carbona Not Glue"	Ramones	1:56
6.	"Suzy Is a Headbanger"	Ramones	2:08
7.	"Pinhead"	Ramones	2:42
Total length:			14:52

Side two
No.	Title	Writer(s)	Length
8.	"Now I Wanna Be a Good Boy"	Dee Dee Ramone	2:10
9.	"Swallow My Pride"	Joey Ramone	2:03
10.	"What's Your Game"	Joey Ramone	2:33
11.	"California Sun" (Joe Jones cover)	Henry Glover, Morris Levy	1:58
12.	"Commando"	Dee Dee Ramone, Johnny Ramone	1:51
13.	"You're Gonna Kill That Girl"	Joey Ramone	2:36
14.	"You Should Never Have Opened That Door"	Dee Dee Ramone, Johnny Ramone	1:54
Total length:			15:05 29:57

=== US reissue ===
- Track listing as per original release with "Sheena Is a Punk Rocker" replacing "Carbona Not Glue" as track 5.

=== UK reissue ===
- Track listing as per original release with "Babysitter" replacing "Carbona Not Glue" as track 5. Released April 1977.

=== 2001 expanded edition CD bonus tracks ===
No.	Title	Writer(s)	Length
15.	"Babysitter"	Ramones	2:44
16.	"Loudmouth" (live)	Dee Dee Ramone, Johnny Ramone	2:08
17.	"Beat on the Brat" (live)	Joey Ramone	2:36
18.	"Blitzkrieg Bop" (live)	Tommy Ramone, Dee Dee Ramone	2:13
19.	"I Remember You" (live)	Ramones	2:17
20.	"Glad to See You Go" (live)	Joey Ramone, Dee Dee Ramone	2:03
21.	"Chain Saw" (live)	Joey Ramone	1:51
22.	"53rd & 3rd" (live)	Dee Dee Ramone	2:27
23.	"I Wanna Be Your Boyfriend" (live)	Tommy Ramone	2:22
24.	"Havana Affair" (live)	Dee Dee Ramone	1:53
25.	"Listen to My Heart" (live)	Dee Dee Ramone	1:47
26.	"California Sun" (live)	Glover, Levy	1:58
27.	"Judy Is a Punk" (live)	Joey Ramone	1:23
28.	"I Don't Wanna Walk Around With You" (live)	Dee Dee Ramone	1:31
29.	"Today Your Love, Tomorrow the World" (live)	Dee Dee Ramone	2:52
30.	"Now I Wanna Sniff Some Glue" (live)	Dee Dee Ramone	1:28
31.	"Let's Dance" (live)	Jim Lee	2:06
Total length:			67:04

Notes

- Track 15 is a Leave Home outtake that replaced "Carbona Not Glue", later released as the B-side of "Do You Wanna Dance?" in 1978.
- Tracks 16–31 recorded live at the Roxy in Hollywood, CA (August 11, 1976). Mixed by T. Erdelyi.

=== 2017 40th anniversary deluxe edition ===
Disc 1

Original album

- Features both the remastered original mixes (tracks 1–14) and the 40th anniversary mix by Ed Stasium (tracks 15–28). Track listings as per original album.

Disc 2

Sundragon rough mixes
No.	Title	Writer(s)	Length
1.	"Glad to See You Go" (rough mix)	Dee Dee Ramone, Joey Ramone	2:13
2.	"Gimme Gimme Shock Treatment" (rough mix)	Dee Dee Ramone, Johnny Ramone	1:43
3.	"I Remember You" (rough mix)	Joey Ramone	2:20
4.	"Oh Oh I Love Her So" (rough mix)	Joey Ramone	2:08
5.	"Carbona Not Glue" (rough mix)	Ramones	1:53
6.	"Suzy Is a Headbanger" (rough mix)	Ramones	2:13
7.	"Pinhead" (rough mix)	Ramones	2:44
8.	"Now I Wanna Be a Good Boy" (rough mix)	Dee Dee Ramone	2:15
9.	"Swallow My Pride" (rough mix)	Joey Ramone	2:08
10.	"What's Your Game" (rough mix)	Joey Ramone	2:38
11.	"California Sun" (rough mix)	Glover, Levy	2:04
12.	"Commando" (rough mix)	Dee Dee Ramone, Johnny Ramone	1:55
13.	"You're Gonna Kill That Girl" (rough mix)	Joey Ramone	2:42
14.	"You Should Never Have Opened That Door" (rough mix)	Dee Dee Ramone, Johnny Ramone	1:54
15.	"Babysitter" (rough mix)	Ramones	2:54

40th anniversary extras
No.	Title	Writer(s)	Length
16.	"Sheena Is a Punk Rocker" (single version)	Joey Ramone	2:45
17.	"I Don't Care" (B-side version)	Joey Ramone	1:38
18.	"Babysitter" (UK album version)	Ramones	2:47
19.	"Glad to See You Go" (Bubblegum Mix)	Dee Dee Ramone, Joey Ramone	2:13
20.	"I Remember You" (instrumental)	Joey Ramone	2:20
21.	"Gimme Gimme Shock Treatment" (Forest Hills Mix)	Dee Dee Ramone, Johnny Ramone	1:43
22.	"Oh Oh I Love Her So" (Soda Machine Mix)	Joey Ramone	2:08
23.	"Carbona Not Glue" (Queens Mix)	Ramones	1:53
24.	"Suzy Is a Headbanger" (Geek Mix)	Ramones	2:13
25.	"Pinhead" (Psychedelic Mix)	Ramones	2:44
26.	"Pinhead" (Oo-Oo-Gabba-Uhuh Mix)	Ramones	2:44
27.	"Now I Wanna Be a Good Boy" (Bowery Mix)	Dee Dee Ramone	2:15
28.	"Swallow My Pride" (instrumental)	Joey Ramone	2:08
29.	"What's Your Game" (Sane Mix)	Joey Ramone	2:38
30.	"California Sun" (instrumental)	Glover, Levy	2:04
31.	"Commando" (TV Track)	Dee Dee Ramone, Johnny Ramone	1:55
32.	"You're Gonna Kill That Girl" (Doo Wop Mix)	Joey Ramone	2:42
33.	"You Should Never Have Opened That Door" (Mama Mix)	Dee Dee Ramone, Johnny Ramone	1:54
Total length:			75:10

Notes

- Tracks 16–18 produced by Tony Bongiovi and T. Erdelyi, engineered by Ed Stasium. Tracks 1–17, 19–33 mixed by Ed Stasium. Track 18 mixed by Bob Clearmountain.
- All tracks, except 16–18, are previously unissued.

Disc 3

Live at CBGB, New York City (April 2, 1977)
No.	Title	Writer(s)	Length
1.	"I Don't Wanna Go Down To The Basement" (live)	Dee Dee Ramone, Johnny Ramone	2:07
2.	"Now I Wanna Sniff Some Glue" (live)	Dee Dee Ramone	1:36
3.	"Blitzkrieg Bop" (live)	Tommy Ramone, Dee Dee Ramone	2:09
4.	"Swallow My Pride" (live)	Joey Ramone	2:06
5.	"Suzy Is a Headbanger" (live)	Ramones	2:13
6.	"Teenage Lobotomy" (live)	Ramones	2:06
7.	"53rd & 3rd" (live)	Dee Dee Ramone	2:10
8.	"Now I Wanna Be a Good Boy" (live)	Dee Dee Ramone	2:12
9.	"Sheena Is a Punk Rocker" (live)	Joey Ramone	2:39
10.	"Let's Dance" (live)	Lee	2:03
11.	"Babysitter" (live)	Ramones	2:52
12.	"Havana Affair" (live)	Dee Dee Ramone, Johnny Ramone	1:51
13.	"Listen To My Heart" (live)	Dee Dee Ramone	1:46
14.	"Oh Oh I Love Her So" (live)	Joey Ramone	1:53
15.	"California Sun" (live)	Glover, Levy	1:53
16.	"I Don't Wanna Walk Around With You" (live)	Dee Dee Ramone	1:32
17.	"Today Your Love, Tomorrow the World" (live)	Dee Dee Ramone	2:36
18.	"Judy Is a Punk" (live)	Joey Ramone	1:40
19.	"Pinhead" (live)	Ramones	2:42
Total length:			39:45

Note

- Disc 3 is a one-microphone audience tape recording. Previously unissued.

LP

Original album - 40th anniversary mix

- Track listing as per original album.

== Personnel ==
Credits adapted from AllMusic and the 2017 deluxe edition booklet.

Ramones

- Joey Ramone – lead and backing vocals
- Johnny Ramone – guitar
- Dee Dee Ramone – bass, backing vocals
- Tommy Ramone – drums, additional guitar

Additional musicians

- Ed Stasium – additional guitar, Hammond organ on "Oh Oh I Love Her So", backing vocals
- Tony Bongiovi – percussion

Technical

- Tony Bongiovi – producer
- Tommy Ramone – producer (credited as T. Erdelyi), mixing
- Ed Stasium – engineer, mixing
- Bob Clearmountain – engineer
- Ray Janos – mastering
- Moshe Brakha – front cover photography
- John Gillespie – art direction
- Pat Chiono – design
- Arturo Vega – back cover art

== Charts ==
Chart (1977)	Peak position
UK Albums (Official Charts)	45
US Billboard 200	148

Chart (2025)	Peak position
Greek Albums (IFPI)	18
