= Arturo Vega =

Mexican-American graphic designer

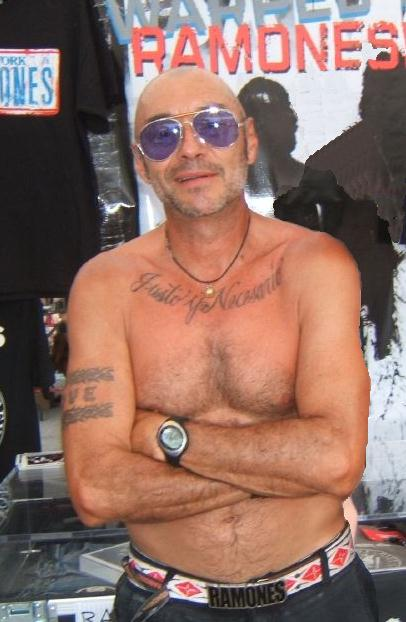
- Vega in 2006
- Born: October 13, 1947; Chihuahua, Mexico
- Died: June 8, 2013 (aged 65); New York City, New York
- Occupation: Graphic designer
- Years active: 1975–2013
- Employer: The Ramones

Arturo Vega (13 October 1947 – 8 June 2013) was a Mexican-American graphic designer best known for his long association with the punk rock group The Ramones. He designed the group's iconic logo, and was sometimes called the fifth Ramone. Officially dubbed the group's artistic director, he was also charged with designing stage lighting for concerts, supervised sales of shirts and other merchandise and was the band's sometimes spokesman.

In 1973, Vega became friends with Dee Dee Ramone (born Douglas Colvin) whose girlfriend lived in Vega's apartment building. During the band's existence between 1974 and 1996, Vega attended all but a handful of their over 2,200 concerts.

Vega's logo for the Ramones was inspired by the U.S. Presidential Seal, with several alterations including the band member's names arranged in a circle, and the eagle gripping a baseball bat rather than a quiver of arrows (a reference to their song "Beat on the Brat" and Johnny Ramone's love of baseball). He adapted the Presidential Seal to reflect his belief that Ramones were "the ultimate all-American band”.

Vega died from cancer on 8 June 2013 at the age of 65.

== Career ==
Inspired by Andy Warhol, the exploration of geometric abstractions by the De Stijl works of Piet Mondrian, and the playfulness of Roy Lichtenstein in his artistic approach, Vega liked to experiment with shapes, words and bright colors in the pop art style.

In 2008, Arturo moved to Berlin to mount the permanent exhibition that is the Ramones Museum. The Ramones Museum team stated "He was constantly urging us to shake things up and move things around, to see things differently, to experiment and not to keep anything set in stone."

A photograph of the Ramones by Vega was exhibited at MoMa in 2014 as part of the exhibition Designing Modern Women 1890 - 1990. In 2017, a retrospective exhibition was held at Howl Art in New York City, titled "Empire: An Arturo Vega Retrospective".

The non-profit organization Howl! Arts, located in New York City's East Village and founded in 2015 by Jane Friedman, offers regular retrospectives that include Vega's work. The exhibition Icons, Iconoclasts and Outsiders held from September 2021 to March 2022, included several of his paintings as did the 2015 exhibition Arturo Vega American Treasure at Howl! and Empire: An Arturo Vega Retrospective in 2016 at the Bob Rauschenberg Gallery.
