= Sheena Is a Punk Rocker =

1977 single by Ramones

Single by Ramones

from the album Rocket to Russia
- B-side: "I Don't Care"
- Released: May 1977
- Recorded: April 1977
- Genre: Punk rock; surf rock; power pop
- Length: 2:49
- Label: Sire
- Songwriter: Joey Ramone
- Producers: Tony Bongiovi, Tommy Ramone

Ramones singles chronology
"Carbona Not Glue" (1977)	"Sheena Is a Punk Rocker" (1977)	"Rockaway Beach" (1977)

Music video
- "Sheena Is a Punk Rocker" on YouTube

"Sheena Is a Punk Rocker" is a song by American punk rock band Ramones, released in 1977 through Sire Records. Written by front man and lead vocalist Joey Ramone, it appears on the band's third studio album, Rocket to Russia (1977). The song is well known for its early 1960s influence of surf rock and bubblegum pop that influenced Joey; it has since remained one of the band's most popular songs.

The song first appeared in May 1977 as a single in the UK, where it charted at number 22 in the UK Singles Chart. In the US, it was released as a single in July 1977, and reached number 81 in the Billboard Hot 100, and appeared on copies of the second issue of the band's 1977 album Leave Home (replacing the track "Carbona Not Glue"). The track, as well as its B-side, "I Don't Care", was remixed and re-released for their third LP, Rocket to Russia.

== Background ==
The "Sheena" referred to in the title is the comic-book character Sheena, Queen of the Jungle; the idea being that punk rock music would appeal to a savage jungle girl brought to civilization. Several online articles focused on the artist reference an interview in which Joey Ramone said of the track, "To me 'Sheena' was the first surf/punk rock teenage rebellion song. I combined Sheena, Queen of the Jungle, with the primalness of punk rock. Then Sheena is brought into the modern day."

The song is notable for being one of the first to explicitly refer to "punk rock" in its title and lyrics in terms of a subculture.

== Reception ==
Record World said that the single "recalls California surf instrumentals, and it could be [the Ramones'] first hit". Cash Box said that "this combination of grinding guitars, rock nostalgia and Anglophiliac delivery could only belong to the Ramones" and that it "is their slickest effort to date".

The song was ranked at number 5 among the top "Tracks of the Year" for 1977 by NME; it is ranked number 461 on Rolling Stone's list of the 500 Greatest Songs of All Time in 2010, number 457 in 2004, and number 434 in 2021 and is included in the Rock and Roll Hall of Fame's 500 Songs that Shaped Rock and Roll.

== Charts ==
Chart (1977)	Peak position
Sweden (Sverigetopplistan)	20
UK Singles (The Official Charts Company)	22
US Billboard Hot 100	81
