= Benjamin Bronfman =

American entrepreneur and musician (born 1982)

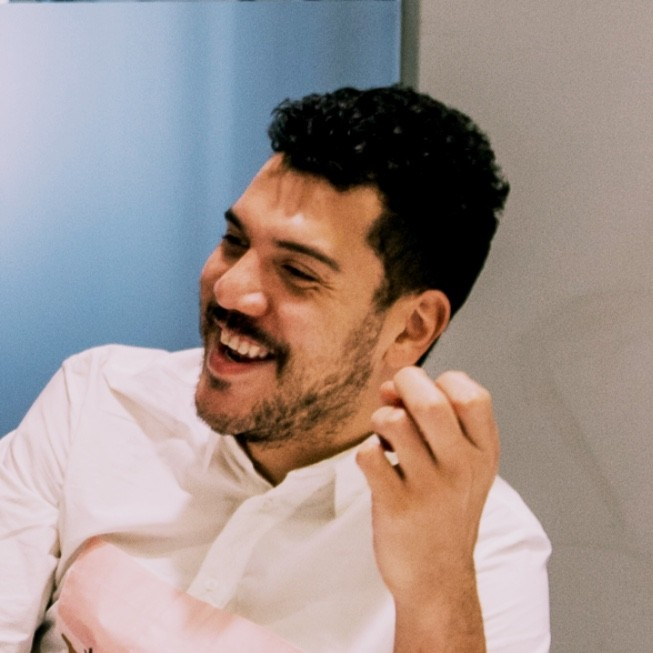
- Bronfman in 2023
- Born: August 6, 1982 (age 44); New York City, U.S.
- Occupations: Businessman, musician
- Partner: Mathangi Arulpragasam (2008–2012)
- Children: 1
- Father: Edgar Bronfman Jr.
- Relatives: John Langeloth Loeb Sr. (great-grandfather); Samuel Bronfman (great-grandfather); Edgar Miles Bronfman (grandfather); Hannah Bronfman (sister)

Benjamin Zachary Bronfman (born August 6, 1982) is an American businessman and musician. Bronfman is a founding partner and board member of Global Thermostat, a direct air capture company that removes carbon dioxide from the atmosphere.

== Early life ==
Benjamin Zachary Bronfman was born on August 6, 1982, in New York City to Black American actress Sherry Brewer Bronfman and Edgar Bronfman Jr., former chief executive officer of Warner Music Group. He has two sisters, Hannah and Vanessa.

Through his paternal grandmother, Ann Loeb Bronfman, he is a member of the prominent Lehman family of Jewish Americans who founded the investment bank Lehman Brothers.

Bronfman lived in London briefly when his father was managing director of Seagram Distilleries Europe. The family returned to New York in 1984 after his father became president of Seagram's US marketing division.

Bronfman attended Collegiate High School in New York City, graduating in 2000. He enrolled in Emerson College in Boston, Massachusetts, where he studied politics and law.

== Environment and technology ==
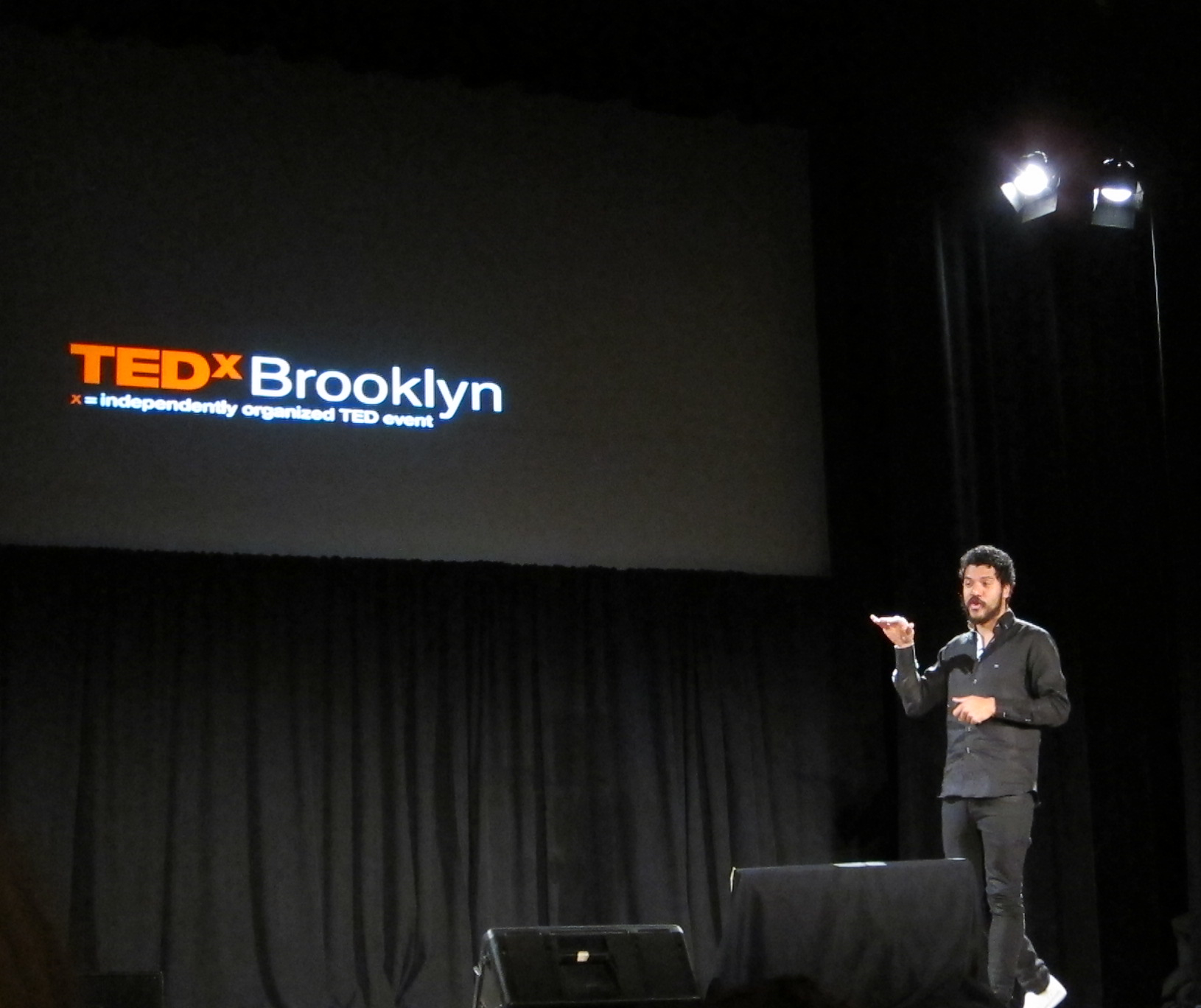
Bronfman at TEDx Brooklyn on November 13, 2010, presenting Global Thermostat vision and process

In 2007, Bronfman became interested in direct carbon dioxide removal from the Earth's atmosphere, teamed up with Columbia University economist Graciela Chichilnisky and founded Global Thermostat, where he is a founding partner and a director. Global Thermostat completed the construction of its first pilot plant at The Stanford Research Institute in November 2010. In the year 2018, Bronfman founded DGH, an investment firm for the medical cannabis industry which invested in Bedrocan International. He then contributed as a member of the board of directors from 2018 - 2023 at Bedrocan International., a pharmaceutically focused medical cannabis API supply company in Europe.

== Music ==
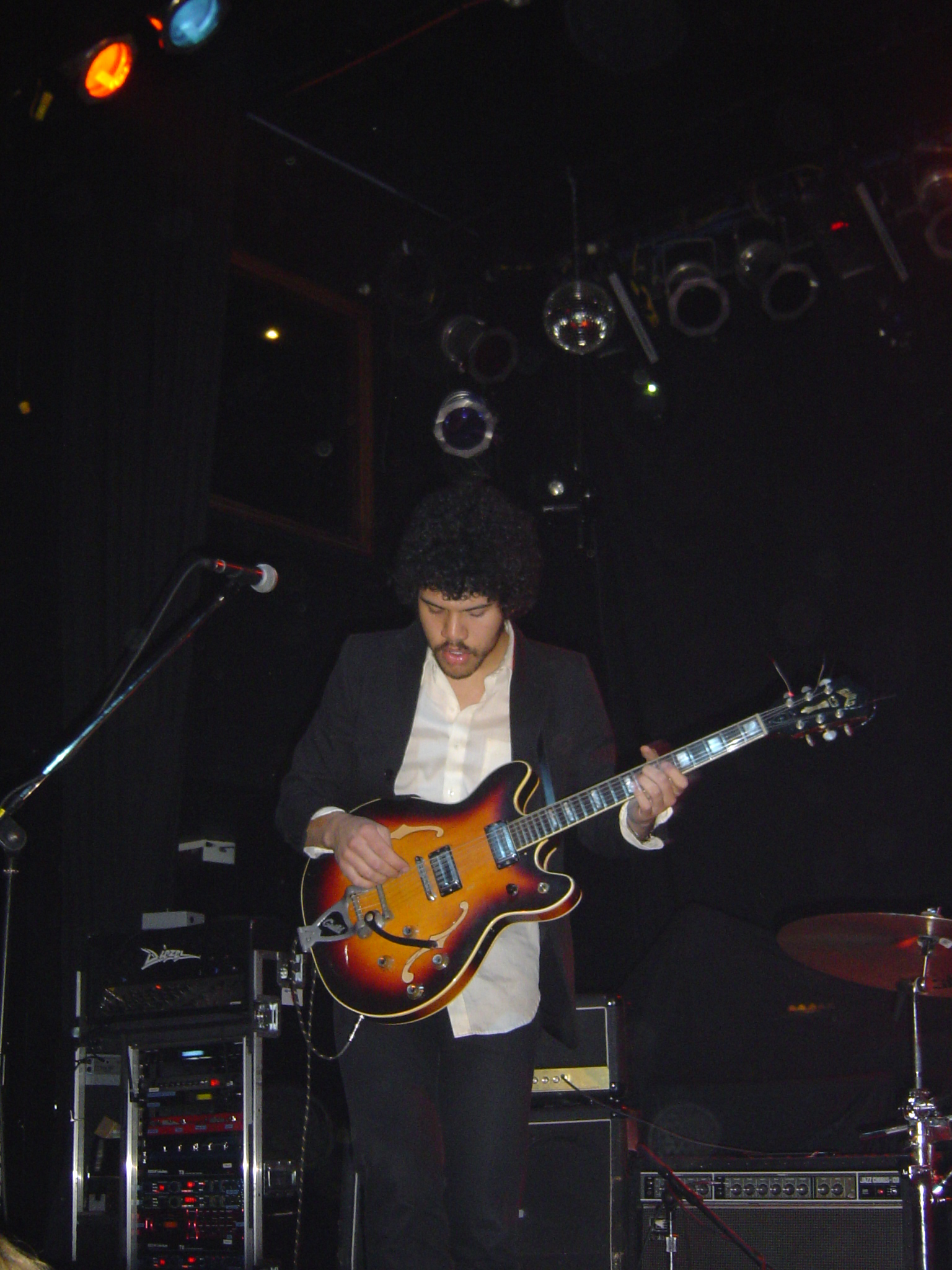
Bronfman performing with The Exit in 2004

A music enthusiast since his childhood, Bronfman met Gunnar Olsen in high school and both performed in various bands. One of those bands became an early incarnation of The Exit in 2000, when Bronfman met Jeff DaRosa, while attending Emerson College in Boston.

Bronfman received a Grammy nomination for Best rap song for his contribution to Kanye West's single "New Slaves" featured on the album Yeezus. He co-produced the track "Monster", which was included on Kanye West's Grammy Award-winning album My Beautiful Dark Twisted Fantasy.

Bronfman is the founder of Green Owl, which claims to be the world's first sustainability-focused record label.

Albums
| Year | Album | Track list |
|---|---|---|
| 2002 | New Beat | 1. Worthless; 2. Lonely Man's wallet 3. Sit and wait 4. Scream and shout 5. Trapped; 6. Find me 7. Still waiting 8. When I'm Free; 9. Defacto; 10. Question the Chorus; 11. Watertown |
| 2004 | Home for an Island | 1. Don't Push; 2. Let's go down the Haiti; 3. Back to the Rebels; 4. Home for an Island; 5. Pressure cooker 6. Tell me all again 7. The sun will rise in Queens; 8. Soldier; 9. Warm summer days 10. Darlin; 11. So leave then 12. Already gone |

EPs
| Year | Title |
|---|---|
| 2004 | Sing four favorites |
| 2006 | The live session EP (iTunes exclusive release) |

Music video
| Year | Title | Directed by |
|---|---|---|
| 2002 | Lonely Man's wallet | Major Lightner |
| 2004 | Let's go to Haiti | Major Lightner |
| 2005 | Don't push | Terry Timley |
| 2005 | Soldier | Lightner |
| 2006 | Back to the Rebels | Lightner and Javier Hernandez |

== Personal life ==
Bronfman met British rapper M.I.A. in 2008. They became engaged and M.I.A. gave birth to their son on February 13, 2009. In February 2012, it was announced that they had separated.

== Non-profit work and activism ==
Since 2010, Bronfman has engaged in cannabis advocacy efforts aimed at promoting legislative changes to grant patients access to cannabis.

He has been on the boards of the non-profit organizations: Pioneer Works, Liberty Science Center, Americans for Safe Access, and 15 Percent Pledge.

In 2017, Bronfman fought Kweku Mandela in a charity boxing match in London to raise awareness and funds against animal poaching.
