= I Hate Freaks Like You =

Studio album by Dee Dee Ramone I.C.L.C.
- Released: April 17, 1994
- Recorded: February–March 1994
- Studio: Klank Studios, Tegelen, The Netherlands
- Genre: Punk rock
- Length: 31:46
- Label: World Service/Rough Trade Records
- Producer: Gert Jan "Joe" Avesaath

Dee Dee Ramone I.C.L.C. chronology
Standing in the Spotlight (1989)	I Hate Freaks Like You (1994)	Zonked! (1997)

Professional ratings
Review scores
Source	Rating
AllMusic	2/5 stars

I Hate Freaks Like You is the second studio album by Dee Dee Ramone, released under the name Dee Dee Ramone I.C.L.C. It was released in Europe in 1994 through World Service, a sublabel of Rough Trade Records.

German singer Nina Hagen guests on two of the album's fourteen tracks. "All's Quiet on the Eastern Front" was originally recorded by the Ramones on Pleasant Dreams (1981) and two songs were later recorded by the Ramones for ¡Adios Amigos! (1995): "I'm Making Monsters for My Friends" and "It's Not for Me to Know".

The Argentinian edition was released on Sick Boy Records in 1994 and contains the Chinese Bitch EP as bonus tracks.

== Track listing ==
All tracks are written by Dee Dee Ramone and Daniel Rey except where noted.

No.	Title	Writer(s)	Length
1.	"I'm Making Monsters for My Friends"		2:42
2.	"Don't Look in My Window"		2:39
3.	"Chinese Bitch"	Ramone, Andy Shernoff	1:48
4.	"It's Not for Me to Know"		3:03
5.	"Runaway"		3:45
6.	"All's Quiet on the Eastern Front"	Ramone	2:18
7.	"I Hate It"		1:51
8.	"Life Is Like a Little Smart Alleck"		2:33
9.	"I Hate Creeps Like You"		1:46
10.	"Trust Me"		4:28
11.	"Curse on Me"		2:56
12.	"I'm Seeing Strawberry's Again"		4:03
13.	"Lass Mich in Ruhe"	Ramone, John Carco, Nina Hagen	2:31
14.	"I'm Making Monsters for My Friends" (Alternate version)		2:36

Argentinian bonus tracks
No.	Title	Writer(s)	Length
15.	"Chinese Bitch"	Ramone, Shernoff	1:30
16.	"I Don't Wanna Get Involved With You"	Ramone	1:36
17.	"That's What Everybody Else Does"		2:39
18.	"We're A Creepy Family"	Ramone, John Carco	1:22

== Personnel ==
- Dee Dee Ramone – vocals, guitars
- Johnny Carco – electric bass, vocals
- Danny Arnold Lommen – drums, percussion

Additional musicians

- Nina Hagen – vocals (13, 14)
- Jan Willem Eleveld – guitar (10), lead guitar (5, 12)
