= Dee Dee Ramone and the Chinese Dragons =

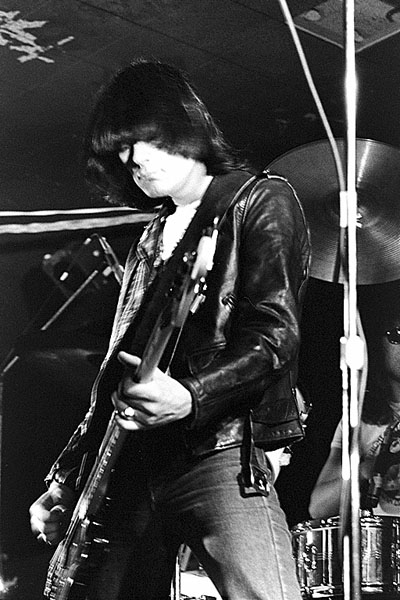
- Dee Dee Ramone with The Ramones, July 1, 1977 Kelly's Pub, St. Paul, MN

Background information
- Origin: Ann Arbor
- Genre: Punk rock
- Years active: 1992–1993
- Label: American Gothic
- Past members: Dee Dee Ramone; Richie Screech; Alan Valentine; Scott Goldstein

Dee Dee Ramone and the Chinese Dragons was a band fronted by former Ramones bassist Dee Dee Ramone. It was formed in March 1992, and was the second post-Ramones band for Dee Dee, following Dee Dee Ramone and the Spikey Tops. The band was made up of Ramone on guitar and vocals, former Liars, Cheats and Thieves members Richie Screech (a.k.a. Richie Karaczynski) and Alan Valentine on guitar and bass respectively, and Scott Goldstein on drums. In the band's short time together, they only released one 7" single which featured an original song on the a-side and a cover of the New York Dolls' "Chatterbox" on the b-side. Ramone's next project after this was Dee Dee Ramone I.C.L.C.

== "What About Me" single ==
1. "What About Me" (Dee Dee Ramone) – 3:22
2. "Chatterbox" (Johnny Thunders) – 1:59
