= Greatest & Latest (Dee Dee Ramone album) =

Studio album by Dee Dee Ramone
- Released: June 2000
- Recorded: March 2000
- Studio: TON Studios, Hollywood, California
- Genre: Punk rock
- Length: 38:31
- Label: Conspiracy Music (US); Eagle Records (Europe)
- Producer: Chris Spedding

Dee Dee Ramone chronology
| Hop Around (2000) | Greatest & Latest (2000) |

Professional ratings
Review scores
| Source | Rating |
|---|---|
| AllMusic | 2.5/5 stars |

Greatest & Latest is the fifth and final studio album by Dee Dee Ramone, released in 2000. It consists of re-recordings of Ramones songs, a re-recorded solo song ("Fix Yourself Up"), cover songs and an unreleased new song ("Sidewalk Surfin'").

The album was first available for sale online through the Los Angeles based independent record label Conspiracy Music. It was released in Japan in June 2000 and in Europe in August 2000.

== Track listing ==
| No. | Title | Writer(s) | Original artist(s) | Length |
|---|---|---|---|---|
| 1. | "Blitzkrieg Bop" | Ramones | Ramones | 2:05 |
| 2. | "Time Bomb" | Dee Dee Ramone | Ramones | 1:57 |
| 3. | "Sheena Is a Punk Rocker" | Ramones | Ramones | 2:39 |
| 4. | "Shakin' All Over" | Johnny Kidd | Johnny Kidd & the Pirates | 2:50 |
| 5. | "I Wanna Be Sedated" | Ramones | Ramones | 2:28 |
| 6. | "Cretin Hop" | Ramones | Ramones | 1:59 |
| 7. | "Teenage Lobotomy" | Ramones | Ramones | 1:57 |
| 8. | "Gimme Gimme Shock Treatment" | Ramones | Ramones | 1:36 |
| 9. | "Motorbikin'" | Chris Spedding | Chris Spedding | 2:21 |
| 10. | "Come On Now" | Ramone | Ramones | 2:48 |
| 11. | "Cathy's Clown" | Don Everly | The Everly Brothers | 3:00 |
| 12. | "Pinhead" | Ramones | Ramones | 2:55 |
| 13. | "Rockaway Beach" | Ramones | Ramones | 2:11 |
| 14. | "Fix Yourself Up" | Ramones, John Carco | Dee Dee Ramone | 2:42 |
| 15. | "Sidewalk Surfin'" | Ramones, Barbara Zampini | Dee Dee Ramone | 2:51 |
| 16. | "Beat on the Brat" | Ramones | Ramones | 2:14 |

Non-US bonus track
| No. | Title | Writer(s) | Original artist(s) | Length |
|---|---|---|---|---|
| 17. | "Sidewalk Surfin' (Instrumental)" | Ramone, Zampini | Dee Dee Ramone | 2:12 |

== Personnel ==
- Dee Dee Ramone – vocals, guitar
- Barbara Ramone – bass, vocals
- Chase Manhattan – drums
- Chris Spedding – guitar

Technical

- Chris Spedding – production, mixing
- Josh Achziger – engineering, mixing
- Kevin Bartley – mastering
- Louie Mandrapilias – graphics
- Jim Steinfeldt – photography
