= Greatest & Latest =

Greatest & Latest may refer to:

- Greatest & Latest (Dee Dee Ramone album), 2000
- Greatest & Latest (Warrant album), 1999

== See also ==
- Latest & Greatest, a 2000 album by Great White
