= Easy Living =

Easy Living or Easy Livin' may refer to:

== Films ==
- Easy Living (1937 film), a screwball comedy directed by Mitchell Leisen
- Easy Living (1949 film), starring Victor Mature and directed by Jacques Tourneur
- Easy Living (2017 film), starring Caroline Dhavernas

== Music ==
=== Albums ===
- Easy Living (Paul Desmond album), 1966
- Easy Livin' (Clare Fischer album), 1966
- Easy Living (Ella Fitzgerald and Joe Pass album), 1986
- Easy Living (Etta Jones album), 2000
- Easy Living (Frank Morgan album), 1985
- Easy Living (Ike Quebec album), 1987
- Easy Living (Enrico Rava album), 2003
- Easy Living (Sonny Rollins album), 1977
- Easy Livin': Singles A's & B's, an album by Uriah Heep, 2006

=== Songs ===
- "Easy Living" (song), a song written by Ralph Rainger and Leo Robin for the 1937 film
- "Easy Livin'" (song), a 1972 song by Uriah Heep
- "Easy Livin'", a 1983 song by Fastway from the album Fastway
- "Easy Living", a song by Catherine Britt from the album Dusty Smiles and Heartbreak Cures
- "Easy Living", a song by Gluecifer from Basement Apes

== Other uses ==
- Easy Living (magazine), a magazine published by Advance Publications
- Easy Living, a brand of interior paint produced by Sears Holdings
