= Tender Is the Savage =

Studio album by Gluecifer
- Released: 2000
- Recorded: Gula Studion, Malmö, Sweden
- Genre: Hard rock
- Length: 34:20
- Label: White Jazz; Sub Pop
- Producer: Daniel Rey

Gluecifer chronology
Soaring with Eagles at Night, to Rise with the Pigs in the Morning (1998)	Tender Is the Savage (2000)	Basement Apes (2003)

Professional ratings
Review scores
Source	Rating
AllMusic	3/5 stars
Ox-Fanzine	4.5/5 stars
Rock Hard	7/10

Tender Is the Savage is the third studio album by the Norwegian band Gluecifer. It was originally released in 2000 on White Jazz Record and re-released with bonus tracks later that year. The album was produced by Daniel Rey.

== Critical reception ==
The Austin Chronicle called the album "a sleazy, raucous, brash, and unapologetically paint-by-numbers take on AC/DC." AllMusic wrote that "the potential cheese is made up for by [Gluecifer's] high-energy, guitar-based roots of when 'sex and drugs' were synonymous with the rock star lifestyle." Exclaim! wrote that "if you're too young to remember bands like Junkyard, and just want to hear some basic hard rock with no postmodern twists or surprises, then Tender is the Savage could be your new car cruisin', joint smokin' record of choice." CMJ New Music Monthly called it a "perfect album."

== Track listing ==
All tracks are written by Gluecifer.

No.	Title	Length
1.	"I Got a War"	3:28
2.	"Chewin' Fingers"	2:22
3.	"Ducktail Heat"	2:41
4.	"The General Says Hell Yeah"	3:48
5.	"Red Noses, Shit Poses"	4:11
6.	"Drunk and Pompous"	3:21
7.	"Rip-Off Strasse"	4:16
8.	"Dog Day, Dog Night"	2:52
9.	"Sputnik Monroe"	2:57
10.	"Exit at Gate Zero"	4:16
Total length:		34:20

Re-release bonus tracks
No.	Title	Length
11.	"Thunder And Lightning"	2:59
12.	"Wham Bam Thank You Mam"	3:04
13.	"Get That Psycho Out Of My Face"	3:08
Total length:		44:31

== Personnel ==
Gluecifer

- Biff Malibu – vocals
- Captain Poon – guitar
- Raldo Useless – guitar
- Jon Average – bass
- Danny Young – drums

Additional personnel

- Daniel Rey – production, mixing
- David Carlsson – recording engineer
- Jon Marshall Smith – mixing
- Howie Weinberg – mastering
- Elektralux – photography
