= Ridin' The Tiger =

Studio album by Gluecifer
- Released: May 1997
- Recorded: January – February 1997
- Studio: Sunlight Studios
- Genre: Hard rock
- Length: 37:55
- Label: White Jazz Records

Gluecifer chronology
Ridin' The Tiger (1997)	Soaring with the Eagles at Night, to Rise with the Pigs in the Morning (1998)

Alternative cover

Ridin' The Tiger is the debut album of Norwegian hard rock band Gluecifer. The album was released in May 1997. The songwriting credits on the album refers to several well-known musicians, however these artists did not actually participate in the songwriting for this album and the credits are tributes to musicians that inspired the band.

== Track listing ==
No.	Title	Writer(s)	Length
1.	"Leather Chair"	Captain Poon, Chuck Berry	3:13
2.	"Rock'n'Roll Asshole"	Captain Poon, Angus Young	2:58
3.	"Bounced Checks"	Captain Poon, Keith Richards	4:32
4.	"The Evil Matcher"	Raldo Useless, Ian Kilmister	2:48
5.	"Rockthrone"	Captain Poon, Ron Asheton	3:11
6.	"Burnin' White"	Captain Poon, Malcolm Young	2:45
7.	"Titanium Sunset"	Captain Poon, Tony Iommi	4:58
8.	"We're Out Loud"	Captain Poon, Ted Nugent	2:43
9.	"Obi Damned Kenobi"	Captain Poon, Glenn Danzig	4:04
10.	"Under My Hood"	Captain Poon	3:44
11.	"Prime Mover" (Zodiac Mindwarp and the Love Reaction cover)	Zodiac Mindwarp	2:54
Total length:			37:55

== Personnel ==
Gluecifer

- Biff Malibu – lead vocals
- Captain Poon – guitar, vocals
- Raldo Uselss – guitar
- Jon Average – bass, vocals
- Glueros Bagfire – drums

Additional personnel

- Hellanderson – backing vocals (tracks 2, 5)
- Boba Fett – recording, piano, handclaps
- Fred Spector – mixing
- Peer In de Betou – mastering
- Are Kleivan – design, photography
- Morten Andersen – photography
