= New Beat (album) =

Studio album by The Exit
- Released: May 7, 2002
- Label: Some Records
- Producer: Daniel Rey

The Exit chronology
New Beat (2002)	Home for an Island (2005)

Professional ratings
Review scores
Source	Rating
Allmusic	4/5 stars
Pitchfork Media	2/10 stars

New Beat is a rock album released in 2002 by New York City-based trio The Exit.

== Track listing ==
1. "Worthless"
2. "Lonely Man's Wallet"
3. "Sit and Wait"
4. "Scream and Shout"
5. "Trapped"
6. "Find Me"
7. "Still Waiting"
8. "When I'm Free"
9. "Defacto"
10. "Question the Chorus"
11. "Watertown"
