= Chelsea Horror Hotel =

Book by Dee Dee Ramone

- Front cover of the novel
- Author: Dee Dee Ramone
- Illustrator: Dee Dee Ramone
- Cover artist: Paul Kostabi
- Language: English
- Genre: Horror
- Set in: Chelsea, Manhattan
- Published: May 10, 2001
- Publisher: Thunder's Mouth Press
- Publication place: United States
- Pages: 252
- ISBN: 1-56025-304-5

Chelsea Horror Hotel: A Novel is a 2001 novel by Dee Dee Ramone, a member of the punk band The Ramones. It was released 13 months before the author's fatal heroin overdose The book follows Dee Dee as he dictates daily events at the Hotel Chelsea in New York City with his wife Barbara and dog Banfield. Dee Dee is convinced that the room he stays in is the same where his old friend Sid Vicious killed his girlfriend, Nancy Spungen. Dee Dee is further visited by other dead punks, including Johnny Thunders and Stiv Bators. Throughout the book, Dee Dee tries to buy drugs, and eventually gets mixed up with other addicts. Cover illustrated by Paul Kostabi.
