= Automatic Thrill =

Studio album by Gluecifer
- Released: 2004
- Recorded: August–October 2003
- Studio: Propeller Studios, Oslo; Bruket Studios, Varteig
- Genre: Hard rock
- Length: 36:12
- Label: Sony, Epic, Steamhammer
- Producer: Kåre Christoffer Vestrheim

Gluecifer chronology
Basement Apes (2003)	Automatic Thrill (2004)

Automatic Thrill is the fifth studio album released by the Norwegian band Gluecifer. It was released in 2004 and is the band's last album before disbanding in 2005. Gluecifer would later reunite in 2017. Automatic Thrill was later reissued on vinyl with the additional track "Speedfoot".

== Track listing ==
All tracks are written by Gluecifer.

No.	Title	Length
1.	"Automatic Thrill"	3:26
2.	"Take It"	2:45
3.	"Car Full of Stash"	3:15
4.	"Here Come the Pigs"	3:33
5.	"Dingdong Thing"	2:41
6.	"A Call from the Other Side"	2:52
7.	"Shaking So Bad"	3:49
8.	"Freeride"	3:45
9.	"Put Me on a Plate"	2:44
10.	"Dr. Doktor"	2:37
11.	"The Good Times Used to Kill Me"	4:45
Total length:		36:12

Vinyl tracklist
No.	Title	Length
1.	"Automatic Thrill"	3:26
2.	"Take It"	2:45
3.	"Car Full of Stash"	3:15
4.	"Here Come the Pigs"	3:33
5.	"Dingdong Thing"	2:41
6.	"Speedfoot"	3:04
7.	"A Call from the Other Side"	2:52
8.	"Shaking So Bad"	3:49
9.	"Freeride"	3:45
10.	"Put Me on a Plate"	2:44
11.	"Dr. Doktor"	2:37
12.	"The Good Times Used to Kill Me"	4:45
Total length:		39:16

== Personnel ==
Gluecifer

- Biff Malibu – vocals
- Captain Poon – guitar
- Raldo Useless – guitar
- Stu Manx – bass
- Danny Young – drums

Additional personnel

- Kåre Christoffer Vestrheim – producer, recording, theremin (track 4), piano, sitar (track 8)
- Michael Hartung – recording, mixing (tracks 9, 10)
- Rune Elli – engineer (additional)
- Vidar Ersfjord – engineer (additional)
- Ulf Holand – mixing (tracks 1–8, 11)
- Howie Weinberg – mastering (tracks 1–6, 8–11)
- Espen Berg – mastering (track 7)
- Cato Salsa – mellotron (track 2), piano, organ (tracks 3, 5)
- Maria Zahl Cortés – castanets
- Senôr Gomp – castanets
- Krisvaag – percussion (extra)
- Observatoriet – photography
- Martin Kvamme – artwork, design
