= Hop Around =

Studio album by Dee Dee Ramone
- Released: January 2000
- Recorded: October–November 1998
- Studio: Signal to Noise, Toronto
- Genre: Punk rock
- Length: 32:35
- Label: Other Peoples Music (North America); Corazong Records (Europe); Woimasointu (Finland)
- Producer: Chris Spedding

Dee Dee Ramone chronology
Zonked! (1997)	Hop Around (2000)	Greatest & Latest (2000)

Alternative cover
- 2002 Finnish vinyl reissue

Professional ratings
Review scores
Source	Rating
AllMusic	1.5/5 stars
Kerrang!	2/5 stars

Hop Around is the fourth studio album by Dee Dee Ramone, released in 2000. It was his final album to contain mostly original material before his death in 2002. The album features, among others, producer Chris Spedding on keyboards and guitar, drummer Billy Rogers, who notably played with Johnny Thunders and the Ramones, and Ramone's wife Barbara on bass and vocals.

== Background ==
Dee Dee Ramone and Chris Spedding met each other in Toronto in 1998 just before recording Hop Around. Spedding had been hired by Ramone's label, the Toronto-based Other Peoples Music, to produce the album. According to Spedding, they both enjoyed working together, and he found Ramone to be very professional, "which I didn't expect because he had a strange reputation." Spedding remembered that they worked quickly, "because Dee Dee uses a lot of energy in the studio and got bored quickly. Because of this I think we were well suited."

Recorded in fall 1998, Hop Around was released over a year later in January 2000. Spedding: "Dee Dee was disappointed with the record company (OPM) delaying its release and then not promoting it properly. He wanted to rerecord everything again and put it out on a different label. He asked me to produce the new one. ... I dissuaded him from rerecording the songs from the previous album and we recorded what was to become our last album together, Greatest & Latest.

== Critical reception ==
Allmusic's Stewart Mason gave the album 1½ stars out of 5, describing it as "a pathetic mess made by a guy whose best work was over two decades in his past and who was reduced to Rutles-style imitations of those past glories." He went on to say that Chris Spedding's production gives the album "a crisp '70s punk sheen that's actually rather nice on its own merits but which really only points up the complete lack of inspiration in the songs."

== Track listing ==
All tracks are written by Dee Dee Ramone except where noted.

No.	Title	Writer(s)	Length
1.	"I Don't Wanna Die in the Basement"		1:52
2.	"Mental Patient"		1:40
3.	"Now I Wanna Be Sedated"		2:21
4.	"Rock & Roll Vacation in L.A."		1:59
5.	"Get Out of this House"		1:35
6.	"38th & 8th"		2:38
7.	"Nothin'"	Dave Bingham, Roger Mayne	2:39
8.	"Hop Around"		1:32
9.	"What About Me"		2:26
10.	"I Saw a Skull Instead of My Face"		2:23
11.	"I Wanna You"		2:02
12.	"Master Plan"		2:29
13.	"Born to Lose"	Johnny Thunders	2:35
14.	"Hurtin' Kind"	Doug McCutcheon	2:20
15.	"I'm Horrible"	Ramone, Barbara Ramone, Chris Spedding	2:04

European edition
No.	Title	Writer(s)	Length
1.	"I Don't Wanna Die in the Basement"		1:52
2.	"Mental Patient"		1:40
3.	"Now I Wanna Be Sedated"		2:21
4.	"Rock & Roll Vacation in L.A."		1:59
5.	"Get Out of this House"		1:35
6.	"38th & 8th"		2:38
7.	"Nothin'"	Bingham, Mayne	2:39
8.	"Hop Around"		1:32
9.	"What About Me"		2:26
10.	"I Saw a Skull Instead of My Face"		2:23
11.	"I Wanna You"		2:02
12.	"Master Plan"		2:29
13.	"Chinese Rocks"	Ramone, Richard Hell	2:35
14.	"Hurtin' Kind"	McCutcheon	2:20
15.	"I'm Horrible"	Ramone, Ramone, Spedding	2:04

2002 Finnish vinyl reissue
No.	Title	Writer(s)	Length
1.	"I Don't Wanna Die in the Basement"		1:52
2.	"Mental Patient"		1:40
3.	"Now I Wanna Be Sedated"		2:21
4.	"Rock & Roll Vacation in L.A." (Alternate version)		1:59
5.	"Get Out of this House"		1:35
6.	"38th & 8th"		2:38
7.	"Nothin'"	Bingham, Mayne	2:39
8.	"Hop Around" (Alternate version)		1:32
9.	"What About Me"		2:26
10.	"I Saw a Skull Instead of My Face"		2:23
11.	"I Wanna You"		2:02
12.	"Master Plan"		2:29
13.	"Chinese Rocks"	Ramone, Hell	2:35
14.	"Hurtin' Kind"	McCutcheon	2:20
15.	"I'm Horrible"	Ramone, Ramone, Spedding	2:04
16.	"Be My Baby"	Jeff Barry, Ellie Greenwich, Phil Spector

== Personnel ==
Credits adapted from the album's liner notes.

- Dee Dee Ramone - vocals, guitar
- Barbara Ramone - bass, lead vocals on "Rock & Roll Vacation in L.A.", "Hop Around", "I Wanna You" and "Hurtin' Kind"
- Billy Rogers - drums
- Chris Spedding - mellotron, acetone organ, guitar

Additional musicians

- Jon Drew - drums on "I'm Horrible"
- Gordie Lewis - guitar on "Born to Lose"
- Roger Mayne - guitar on "Nothin'"

Technical

- Chris Spedding - production
- Rob Sanzo - engineering
- Peter J. Moore - mastering
- Sasha - artwork
- Beresford Egan - ink drawings
- Tom Skudra - photography
- Tara Fallaux - photography
