= Standing in the Spotlight =

Studio album by Dee Dee King
- Released: March 1989
- Recorded: 1989
- Studios: Chung King Studios, New York City
- Genres: Old school hip hop; doo-wop; rock and roll; punk rock
- Length: 31:46
- Labels: Sire; Warner Bros.
- Producer: Daniel Rey

Dee Dee Ramone chronology
Standing in the Spotlight (1989)	I Hate Freaks Like You (1994)

Professional ratings
Review scores
Source	Rating
AllMusic	1.5/5 stars
Robert Christgau	C

Standing in the Spotlight is the debut solo studio album by Dee Dee Ramone, released in 1989 under the rap moniker Dee Dee King. The album is sometimes considered to be one of the biggest failures in recording history.

Musically, the songs vary from old school hip hop and doo-wop (e.g., "Mashed Potato Time", "Commotion In The Ocean") to rock and roll (e.g., "Baby Doll") and punk rock (e.g. "Poor Little Rich Girl", "The Crusher"). In an article for The Village Voice in 2014, Chaz Kangas wrote that the album "sound less like a rap record and more like a Ramones album that has rapping on it".

== Background ==
Standing in the Spotlight was released in spring 1989, a few months before Dee Dee left the Ramones. The album marks a radical shift from the Ramones guitar-based punk rock on some songs. Dee Dee learned about rap music during drug rehabilitation, which led him to record the boastful "Funky Man" in 1987, although that song did not end up on the album. Prior to leaving the group, Dee Dee would show up to Ramones gigs in full rap regalia, which frustrated his bandmates.

Dee Dee was struggling with sobriety at this time and was accompanied on the album by the newly sober drummer Marky Ramone, according to Dee Dee's then-wife, Vera. In his book Punk Rock Blitzkrieg: My Life as a Ramone, Marky Ramone writes that he was asked to play drums on the album, but declined: "I preferred just to advise him on the beats to use and quietly take an acknowledgement. I was a rocker, not a rapper."

Dee Dee Ramone was paid a $25,000 advance by Warner Bros. Records to record the album. It was recorded at New York City's Chung King Studios, which at the time had become one of the top recording studios due to their work with Beastie Boys, Run-D.M.C., and LL Cool J. Standing in the Spotlight was not recorded using hip hop production techniques, according to engineer Greg Gordon: "Other hip-hop guys would come in and dig through old records and find grooves and try to play stuff off each other. But this was made more like an old-time rock record with a drum machine".

According to producer and co-writer Daniel Rey, Dee Dee Ramone would come to his house to work in the afternoon: "He would just write down an idea and we'd talk about what kind of song it would be—an angry song or a happy song or a beach song or a ballad. And then I would try to come up with some music that matched the lyrics and we'd put it down on a four-track. He would write the lyrics in like 20 minutes, and then the music would come together pretty quickly".

Talking about the album's lyrics, Rey said in 2016: "I think he was doing what you were supposed to do. Pride and positive thinking. ... I think Dee Dee associated with the whole Gucci gangster thing, where you may be poor, but you have a thousand-dollar chain on. It was like a party record." Gordon surmised that "there was certainly a huge tongue-in-cheek factor. The whole macho hip-hop persona back then. ... I think even when he's saying, 'I'm the master of hip-hop,' he wasn't trying to be Chuck D. I think he believed he was the king of being Dee Dee Ramone. ... I think that is what he was struggling with: being himself. And I think there's a big part of Dee Dee's heart in that record".

Despite the departure from the band's music, Joey Ramone wanted Standing in the Spotlight to be well received, to help kickstart his own solo career. Debbie Harry sings backup vocals on "Mashed Potato Time" and "German Kid". "German Kid" also features Dee Dee rapping in both English and German, the latter of which Dee Dee had learned as an army brat. "Baby Doll" was a ballad he wrote for Vera, his wife. According to her book Poison Heart, when he played it for her, they both cried.

After his departure from the Ramones, Dee Dee left his rap career behind and formed the punk rock band Spikey Tops.

"The Crusher" was recorded by the Ramones and released in 1995 on the ¡Adios Amigos! album.

== Track listing ==
All tracks are written by Dee Dee King and Daniel Rey, except where noted.

No.	Title	Writer(s)	Length
1.	"Mashed Potato Time"	King, Rey, William Garrett, Robert Bateman, Georgia Dobbins, Eddie Holland, Freddie Gorman, Kal Mann	3:15
2.	"2 Much 2 Drink"		3:32
3.	"Baby Doll"		4:41
4.	"Poor Little Rich Girl"		2:31
5.	"Commotion in the Ocean"		3:23
6.	"German Kid"		4:05
7.	"Brooklyn Babe"		3:27
8.	"Emergency"		3:23
9.	"The Crusher"		3:29
10.	"I Want What I Want When I Want It"		4:31

== Personnel ==
Credits adapted from the album's liner notes.

- Dee Dee King – vocals
- Debbie Harry – background vocals on "Mashed Potato Time" and "German Kid"
- Chris Stein – guitar on "German Kid"
- Spyder Mittleman – saxophone on "Mashed Potato Time"
- Daniel Rey – additional music

Technical

- Daniel Rey – producer
- Greg Gordon – engineer
- George Marino – mastering engineer
- Spencer Drate – art direction, design
- Judith Salavetz – art direction, design
- Vera Ramone King (credited as "Baby Doll King") – direction, inspiration, album concept, styling
- Bob Gruen – cover photography
