= Adios Amigos (Ramones album) =

¡Adios Amigos!

Studio album by the Ramones
- Released: July 18, 1995
- Recorded: January–February 1995
- Studios: Baby Monster, New York City
- Genre: Punk rock
- Length: 34:01
- Label: Radioactive
- Producer: Daniel Rey

Ramones chronology
Acid Eaters (1993)	¡Adios Amigos! (1995)

¡Adios Amigos! (in Spanish, "Goodbye Friends") is the fourteenth and final studio album by the American punk rock band Ramones. It was released on July 18, 1995, through Radioactive Records. The Ramones disbanded a year after its release and subsequent tour.

== Background ==
The album was recorded at Baby Monster Studios in New York City, and was the band's third album on Radioactive Records after leaving Sire due to lack of significant sales and chart success. Relations within the band were strained, due to Joey Ramone's deteriorating health—having been diagnosed with Non-Hodgkin lymphoma—Joey and Johnny Ramone’s decade-long feud and a burgeoning rift between Marky and C.J. Long-time friend Daniel Rey was once again recruited to produce, as he was liked by the entire band and knew how to provide a comfortable, pleasant experience for them in the studio.

== Composition and songs ==
In his 2012 autobiography, Commando, Johnny Ramone awarded the album a "B+" grade, stating, "Some of our albums would have three or four really strong songs, and then the rest would be pretty weak. But on this one, even the lesser stuff is decent."

While bassist and songwriter Dee Dee Ramone had left the band following 1989's Brain Drain, ¡Adios Amigos! features six of his compositions, including three previously released: "The Crusher" was originally recorded for his 1989 debut solo album, Standing in the Spotlight (a rap album released under the name Dee Dee King), while "Making Monsters for My Friends" and "It's Not for Me to Know" were originally recorded for the 1994 album I Hate Freaks Like You, which he performed with I.C.L.C. ¡Adios Amigos! also contains cover versions of Tom Waits' "I Don't Want to Grow Up" and The Heartbreakers' "I Love You".

The American version of the album features a hidden track, "Spiderman", slightly different from the version the Ramones originally recorded for the Saturday Morning tribute album. The Japanese version and Captain Oi reissue of the album feature the bonus track "R.A.M.O.N.E.S.", originally recorded by Motörhead as a tribute to the Ramones on their 1991 album 1916.

== Production and recording ==
Johnny Ramone stated that ¡Adios Amigos! had "perhaps the best of all the guitar sounds I ever got."

C.J. Ramone sings lead vocals on the album tracks "Makin Monsters for My Friends", "The Crusher", "Cretin Family" and "Scattergun", as well as the bonus track "R.A.M.O.N.E.S." Dee Dee Ramone makes his first appearance on a Ramones album since 1989 during the bridge of the closing track "Born to Die in Berlin", singing in German and recorded via telephone.

== Artwork ==
The album cover of ¡Adios Amigos!, which features two Allosaurus wearing sombreros, is a digitally altered version of a painting by artist Mark Kostabi, named Enasaurs, which features the dinosaurs wearing yellow witch hats. Johnny Ramone added that the dinosaurs were "what we felt like." Kostabi's painting was in turn modified from a painting by George Geselschap.

The back cover shows the band tied and bound before being executed by a firing squad. Johnny said that he stipulated that the band not be photographed from the front, reasoning, "I was very protective of how we looked at that point, and some of us looked worse than others." He added, "I had asked that they put the name of the record company on the backs of the firing squad executing us, and they wouldn't go with that."

The sleeping Mexican man seated next to the band is their longtime road manager Monte Melnick. Melnick explained, "They'd always have a Mexican sleeping on the floor in the old cowboy movies so they thought it'd be a nice touch. Shooting the back cover was a gas. A lot of people hate the front though." According to Melnick, Marky Ramone loved the album, due to Daniel Rey's production, but thought the cover was "terrible". "I can relate to a little bit 'cos I felt like a dinosaur," said Johnny, "but I don't know where they fit in with the Mexican hats and all that."

Melnick explained that several of the Ramones' later album covers were designed by manager Gary Kurfirst, with no input from the band, due to a dispute over merchandising royalties. Kurfirst was an art collector and "would buy the art and stick it on the cover and figured it would increase the value of his painting."

== Reception ==
Professional ratings
Review scores
Source	Rating
AllMusic	2.5/5 stars
Robert Christgau	(neither)
Entertainment Weekly	A−
Punknews.org	4/5 stars
Q	3/5 stars
Rock Hard	7.0/10
Rolling Stone	3/5 stars
Uncut	3/5 stars

=== Critical ===
¡Adios Amigos! received mixed to positive reviews and was viewed by many fans as a return to form for the band. Evelyn McDonnell of Entertainment Weekly gave the album an "A−", stating, "their blitzkrieg bop not only hasn't aged but is timelier than ever."

In a retrospective review for AllMusic, Stephen Thomas Erlewine called it "an admirable way to bow out". He added that it recaptured some of the inspiration of Too Tough to Die and was an improvement upon their previous two albums Brain Drain and Mondo Bizarro, but also veered close to self parody. Ultimately, he concluded that it "was the right way to call it a day—it rocks and it rolls, and it's not an embarrassment."

=== Commercial ===
In contrast to the Ramones' long-running inability to break through on singles charts, the band's cover of Tom Waits' "I Don't Want to Grow Up" became a minor hit for the group, breaching the top 40 of Billboard's Modern Rock Tracks chart and peaking at No. 30.

== Track listing ==
All lead vocals by Joey Ramone, except where noted.

Side one
No.	Title	Writer(s)	Lead vocals	Length
1.	"I Don't Want to Grow Up" (Tom Waits cover)	Tom Waits, Kathleen Brennan		2:46
2.	"Makin Monsters for My Friends"	Dee Dee Ramone, Daniel Rey	C.J.	2:35
3.	"It's Not for Me to Know"	D. Ramone, Rey		2:51
4.	"The Crusher"	D. Ramone, Rey	C.J.	2:27
5.	"Life's a Gas"	Joey Ramone		3:34
6.	"Take the Pain Away"	D. Ramone, Rey		2:42
7.	"I Love You" (The Heartbreakers cover)	Johnny Thunders		2:21

Side two
No.	Title	Writer(s)	Lead vocals	Length
8.	"Cretin Family"	D. Ramone, Rey	C.J.	2:09
9.	"Have a Nice Day"	Marky Ramone, Garrett James Uhlenbrock		1:39
10.	"Scattergun"	C.J. Ramone	C.J.	2:30
11.	"Got a Lot to Say"	C.J. Ramone		1:41
12.	"She Talks to Rainbows"	Joey Ramone		3:14
13.	"Born to Die in Berlin"	D. Ramone, John Carco	Joey/Dee Dee	3:32

Unlisted/hidden track on 1995 American version initial releases
No.	Title	Writer(s)	Length
14.	"Spiderman"	Paul Francis Webster, Robert Harris	1:56

1995 Japanese edition & 2004 Captain Oi! CD Bonus track
No.	Title	Writer(s)	Lead vocals	Length
14.	"R.A.M.O.N.E.S." (Motörhead cover)	Motörhead	C.J.	1:24

== Personnel ==
Ramones

- Joey Ramone – lead vocals (tracks 1, 3, 5–7, 9, 11–13 and "Spiderman"), backing vocals (track 4)
- Johnny Ramone – guitars
- Marky Ramone – drums
- C.J. Ramone – bass; lead vocals (tracks 2, 4, 8, 10 and "R.A.M.O.N.E.S.")

Additional musicians

- Daniel Rey – lead guitar
- Dee Dee Ramone – co-lead vocals (track 13)

Technical

- Daniel Rey – producer
- Gary Kurfirst – executive producer
- Bryce Goggin – engineer
- Ian Bryan – assistant engineer
- Tom Lester – assistant engineer
- George Marino – mastering
- Tim Stedman – art direction, design
- Jen Cohen – design
- Todd Gallopo – design
- George DuBose – photography
- Mark Kostabi – cover painting
- Ivory – additional paintings

== Charts ==
=== Album ===
Chart (1995)	Peak position
Japanese Albums (Oricon)	61
Scottish Albums (Official Charts)	81
Swedish Albums (Sverigetopplistan)	16
UK Albums (Official Charts)	62
US Billboard 200	147

=== Singles ===
Single	Chart (1995)	Position
"I Don't Want to Grow Up"	US Mainstream Rock Airplay (Billboard)	30
"I Don't Want to Grow Up"	Canada Rock/Alternative (RPM)	18
