= Funky Man (Dee Dee King song) =

Single by Dee Dee King
- B-side: "Funky Man (Dub)"
- Released: 1987
- Studio: Chung King House of Metal (New York City)
- Genre: Hip-hop
- Length: 4:48
- Label: Rock Hotel
- Songwriter: Dee Dee King
- Producers: Chris Williamson; Rich Reinhardt

"Funky Man" is a single by Dee Dee King, the rapper alias of Ramones bassist Dee Dee Ramone. It was released as a 12-inch single by Profile Records imprint Rock Hotel Records, with the B-side being an extended dub version of the song. The cover art work was by James Rizzi.

The single was recorded after Ramone was in a drug treatment center where he was introduced to rap. He was still in the Ramones when it was released, although he left the band in 1989 and then released a full album under his King alias, Standing in the Spotlight.

== Track listing ==
1. "Funky Man" – 4:48
2. "Funky Man (Dub)" – 6:50
