= Conspiracy Music =

Independent record label

Conspiracy Music, the trade name of Robison Records Limited, is an independent record label formed in 1999 by brothers Monte J. Robison and Taylor Robison. It ceased operations in 2002.

The label produced and released studio and live album recordings by artists such as Gene Loves Jezebel, The Alarm, The Call, and Dee Dee Ramone of The Ramones.

Many of these albums and select tracks were sublicensed by other record labels, including (Toshiba-EMI Limited, Eagle Rock Records, Universal Music Group), and released in countries such as Canada, Japan, Australia, Germany, the United Kingdom and Portugal.

The label organized the Resurrection Tour in 1999 featuring Mission UK, Gene Loves Jezebel and Mike Peters of The Alarm. The tour was sponsored by eMusic and had scheduled concert dates in North America and Europe.

In 2000, the label produced a tribute album to glam rock along with KROQ-FM DJ, Rodney Bingenheimer, featuring tracks from Cyclefly, The Donnas, Nick Heyward and Tube Tops 2000 featuring Eric Erlandson, Melissa Auf der Maur, Clem Burke and Kathy Valentine.

Monte J. Robison appears briefly in the Mayor of the Sunset Strip, the documentary biography of Rodney Bingenheimer, directed by George Hickenlooper.

== Selected discography ==
- Gene Loves Jezebel – VII, (1999)
- Gene Loves Jezebel – Live In The Voodoo City (1999)
- Gene Loves Jezebel – The Dog House Sessions, (1997)
- Gene Loves Jezebel – Heavenly Bodies, (1999, rerelease)
- Dee Dee Ramone – Greatest & Latest (2000)
- The Call – Live Under The Red Moon, (2000)
- Various Artists – Rodney Bingenheimer Presents Blockbuster: A Tribute To 70's Glitter Glam Rock (2000)
- The Alarm – Acoustic Alarm Standards (2002)
- Matt Sorum – Hollywood Zen (2002, unreleased)
