= Bloodlights =

Norwegian hard rock/melodic rock band

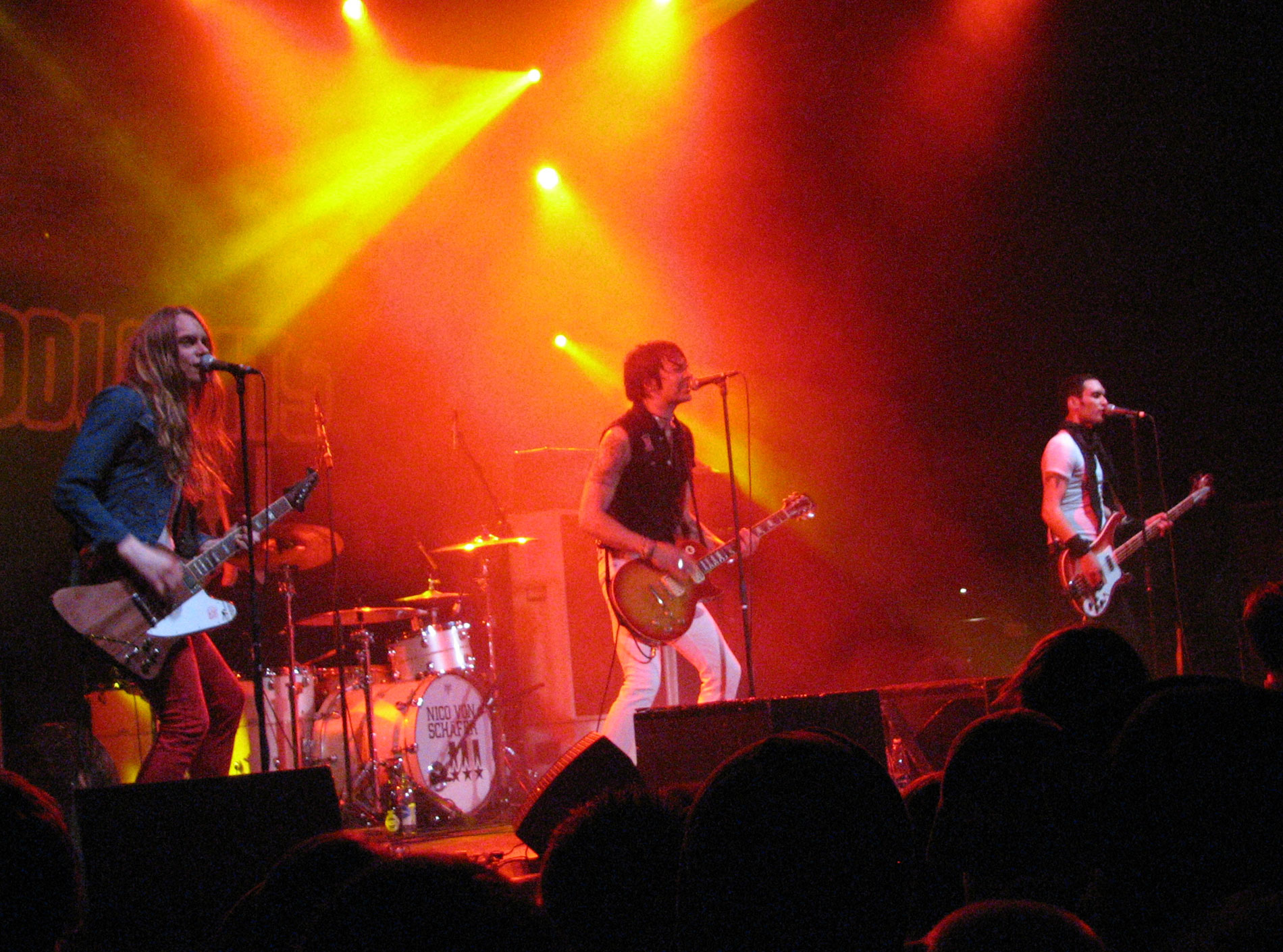
- Bloodlights at Conventum, Örebro, Sweden April 12, 2008.

Background information
- Origin: Oslo, Norway
- Genre: Hard rock
- Years active: 2006–present
- Labels: Mate In Germany, Playground Music Scandinavia, People Like You Records
- Members: Captain Poon (Arne Skagen); Chris Banjo (Geir Kristian Egenes); Sonny Bones
- Past members: Jonas Thire; Nico Von Schäfer; Ron Elly; Kristian Nygaard Solhaug; Woody Lee (Vidar Åsly); Howie B (Håvard Lunøe-Nielsen)
- Website: http://www.bloodlights.com

Bloodlights is a Norwegian hard rock/melodic rock four-piece from Oslo, and formed by Captain Poon, former guitarist of Gluecifer.

== History ==
Guitarist Captain Poon formed Bloodlights in 2006, after his hard rock outfit Gluecifer broke up in 2005. The name comes from the phenomenon of seeing red flashes right before passing out after consuming too much "of everything". After some time writing songs, Captain Poon stepped into the role as both guitar player and vocalist, taking a more melodic approach. After some rehearsals with drummer Jonas Thire of Amulet, bassist Ron Elly joined. Guitarist Howie B joined in March the same year, and the band spent most of their time recording demos and rehearsing. Their first single, produced by the band, "One Eye Open", was part of a soundtrack for the Norwegian horror movie Fritt Vilt. The song was later re-recorded for their debut album.

In early 2007, the band recorded their debut album in Berlin with producer Phil Caivano from Monster Magnet. The self-titled album was released in November 2007 on German label Mate In Germany, owned by the band's manager, Ole Kirchoff, and distributed in Scandinavia by Playground Music Scandinavia. In 2010, Nico Von Schäfer was replaced by Woody Lee.

In May 2013 the band released their third album Stand Or Die. On October 9, 2015 the band released an EP called Somebody Else's Nightmare on Captain Poon's own label Konkurs Productions.

In 2016 Captain Poon was on tour as guitarist in Marky Ramone's Blitzkrieg.

Their fourth album Pulling no Punches was released on 26 May 2017, also on Konkurs Productions. Nicke Andersson was involved in the production.

== Influences ==
Bloodlights' style and material are heavily influenced by 1970s and 1980s melodic rock, often combining melodic vocals with hard rock riffs, such as Thin Lizzy. The band is also influenced by harder rock acts such as Judas Priest, Black Sabbath, and AC/DC. There's also boogie rock tendencies to trace, influenced by general Scandinavian rock, and seventies classic rock acts such as early Status Quo and Cheap Trick.

== Discography ==
=== Albums ===
- Bloodlights (Mate In Germany/Playground, 2007)
- Simple Pleasures (Silversonic, 2010)
- Stand or Die (People Like You Records, 2013)
- Pulling no Punches (Konkurs Productions, 2017)

=== Soundtracks ===
- "One Eye Open " (Fritt Vilt)

=== Singles & EPs ===
- The Hammer and The Wheel, On "Øya Oslo 2007" (Compilation from the Øya festival, 2007)
- One Eye Open, On "Prosjekt 101" (Meet Productions/Musikkoperatørene)
- Bloodlights, On "All Areas Volume 87" (Visions Magazine, 2007)
- God of Rock! (Split with Imperial State Electric) (Soulseller Records, 2011)
- Bloodlights vs. Gonzales, (Split with Gonzales) (Kornalcielo Records, 2011)
- When Your Train Comes (Ghost Highway Recordings, 2012)
- Bloodlights / Dieter Jackson, (Split with Dieter Jackson) (Janml Records, 2015)
- Somebody Else's Nightmare, (Konkurs Productions, 2015)
- Bloodlights/The Hip Priests, (Split with The Hip Priests) (Ghost Highway Recordings / Self Destructo Records, 2016)
