= Daniel Rey =

American record producer

Daniel Rey (born Daniel Rabinowitz) is an American musician, record producer and songwriter from New York City, best known for his work with the punk rock band Ramones.

As a teenager Rey played in punk band Shrapnel, which also featured Dave Wyndorf, later of Monster Magnet. Shrapnel put out two 45 singles (Combat Love and Go Cruisin') and a five-song self-titled e.p., and played CBGB regularly in their brief career. He first collaborated with the Ramones on their 1984 album Too Tough to Die, where he co-wrote the song "Daytime Dilemma (Dangers of Love)" with Joey Ramone, and from there produced three of the band's albums, Halfway to Sanity, Brain Drain and ¡Adios Amigos!. He co-wrote the popular Ramones single Pet Sematary with Dee Dee Ramone. Rey did all of the guitar work for 9 of the 11 songs on Joey Ramone's 2002 solo album Don't Worry About Me.

Rey also co-wrote the song 'Everglade' with Jennifer Finch of L7, which became the second-highest selling single in the band's history.

Rey was also the guitarist for the band Manitoba's Wild Kingdom, which he formed in 1986 with Handsome Dick Manitoba and Andy Shernoff of The Dictators. Wild Kingdom released a version of "New York New York" on the 1988 soundtrack to Mondo New York, before Rey left the band and was replaced by Ross "The Boss" Friedman. He was also the guitarist/producer for Ronnie Spector since the mid 1990s.

Among dozens of other production credits, Rey produced both albums that the reunited Misfits did with replacement vocalist Michale Graves.

Rey recorded the theme song to Todd Solondz's cult comedy Welcome to the Dollhouse (1995), as well as a number of other tracks on the soundtrack. In the movie, Rey's recording of the theme song is the one that is heard while a young actor's character plays the song with his garage band.

In the 2010s, he played with The Martinets.

== Production discography ==
- Ramones – Halfway to Sanity (1987)
- The Skulls – Blacklight 13 (1987)
- Gang Green – I81B4U EP (1988)
- Circus of Power – Circus of Power (1988)
- Adrenalin O.D. – Cruising with Elvis in Bigfoot's UFO (1988)
- Ramones – Brain Drain (1989)
- White Zombie – God of Thunder EP (1989)
- Dee Dee King (Dee Dee Ramone) – Standing in the Spotlight (1989)
- Circus of Power – Vices (1990)
- The Golden Horde – The Golden Horde (1991)
- Raging Slab – Raging Slab (1989)
- Rhino Bucket – Rhino Bucket (1991)
- Wax – What Else Can We Do (1992)
- Doughboys – Crush (1993)
- D Generation – No Way Out EP (1993)
- Green Apple Quick Step – Wonderful Virus (1993)
- White Trash – Si O Si Que? (1993)
- King Missile – King Missile (1994)
- Ramones – ¡Adios Amigos! (1995)
- Richard Hell – Go Now (1995)
- Banlieue Rouge – Sous un ciel écarlate (1996)
- Murphy's Law – Dedicated (1996)
- Doughboys – Turn Me On (1996)
- The Independents – Stalker EP (1997)
- The Misfits – American Psycho (1997)
- Dee Dee Ramone – Zonked (1997)
- Blanks 77 – C.B.H. (1998)
- Entombed – Same Difference (1998)
- Pure Rubbish – Tejas Waste EP (1999)
- Pist.On – $ell.Out (1999)
- The Misfits – Famous Monsters (1999)
- (REO) Speedealer – Here Comes Death (1999)
- Ronnie Spector – She Talks to Rainbows (1999)
- Gluecifer – Tender Is the Savage (2000)
- The Exit – New Beat (2002)
- Joey Ramone – Don't Worry About Me (2002)
- Joey Ramone – Christmas Spirit... In My House EP (2002)
- The Independents – Back from the Grave (2002)
- Tequila Baby – Punk Rock até os Ossos (2002)
- The Valentines – Life Stinks (2005)
- Nashville Pussy – Get Some (2005)
- Sour Jazz – Rock & Roll Ligger (2005, Acetate Records)
- Nebula – Apollo (2006)
- Teenage Head with Marky Ramone – Teenage Head with Marky Ramone (2008)
- Sour Jazz – American Seizure (2009, Acetate Records)
- Joey Ramone – "Ya Know?" (2012)
