= The Exit =

American band

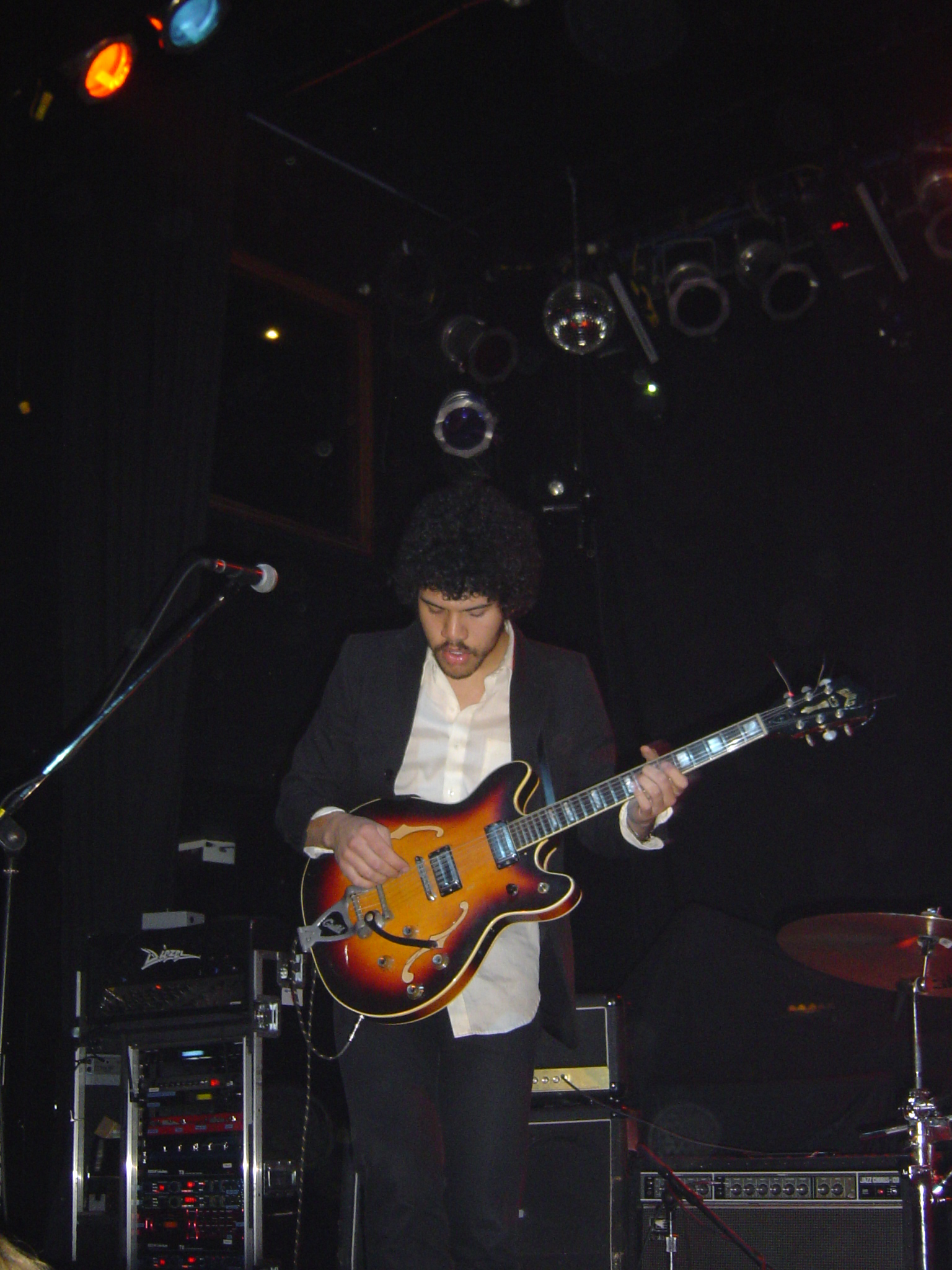
- The Exit performing at The Mod Club, Toronto, in April 2004

Background information
- Origin: New York City, U.S.
- Genres: Indie rock, reggae, post-punk
- Years active: 2000–2007
- Labels: Some, Wind-up
- Past members: Ben Brewer; Gunnar Olsen; Jeff DaRosa

The Exit was a New York City-based band indie/post-punk/reggae group, formed in 2000. The band's music blended 1980s dub and reggae with 1990s punk and indie rock. The band's members included Ben Brewer on lead guitar and vocals, and Gunnar Olsen on drums. Jeff DaRosa was formerly the band's lead vocals and bass player.

== History ==
Ben Brewer, a.k.a. Benjamin Bronfman, son of billionaire Edgar Bronfman Jr., met Olsen in high school. The two have played in several bands together. One of these bands turned into an early incarnation of The Exit. In 2000 Brewer met Jeff DaRosa while attending Emerson College in Boston. DaRosa grew up in Watertown, Massachusetts and was the bassist of the local punk band The Vigilantes. Brewer convinced DaRosa to join the group, and they started practicing in basements around Boston. The band made a demo tape which made its way into the hands of Daniel Rey known for his work with The Ramones. Rey produces the band's first record, New Beat, which came out on Some Records, a label started by Walter Schreifels.

The band started touring in early 2001, booking their own shows. New Beat received favorable reviews, many of which likened the band to The Clash, The Police and U2. The artwork was done by Damian Genuardi of the Explosion.

The Exit then entered the studio with producer Ron Saint Germain (Bad Brains, Tool, Sonic Youth) to produce a follow-up, Home For An Island. The album featured Brewer singing lead for the first time, tribal rhythms, dubbed out guitars, and psychedelic bridges. The album was a political response to life in post-9/11 New York City. Songs include "Soldier," "Home For an Island," "Let's Go to Haiti" and "Back to the Rebels." The album was originally released in 2004 on Some Records, but in 2005 The Exit signed to Wind-Up Records and re-released Home for an Island, adding three new songs "Sun Will Rise in Queens," "Pressure Cooker" and "Warm Summer Days." Reviews were good. The Exit supported Muse on two different US tours.

On August 15, 2006, through a post on their MySpace blog, the band announced the departure of Jeff DaRosa. Olsen and Brewer noted the band will continue with a yet-to-be-announced lineup. The band was officially disbanded in 2007.

== Tours ==
- Toured with Taking Back Sunday and Coheed and Cambria in 2002
- Toured with RX Bandits in 2002, 2003, and 2005, playing both the US and the UK
- Supported Muse during spring and winter of 2004
- Supported for 311 during the winter of 2005
- Supported OAR
- Supported Against Me

== Band members ==
- Benjamin Brewer - vocals, guitar
- Gunnar Olsen - drums, vocals
- Jeff DaRosa - vocals, bass guitar

== Discography ==
=== Albums ===
- New Beat (May 4, 2002)
- Home for an Island (original release September 7, 2004; re-released October 11, 2005)

=== EPs ===
- Sing Four Favorites (October 1, 2004)
- The Live Sessions EP (June 20, 2006) (iTunes exclusive release)

=== Live albums ===
- Live at the Metro 4/24/04 (2004)
- Live EP (2006)

== Music videos ==
- "Lonely Man's Wallet" (2002), directed by Major Lightner
- "Let's Go to Haiti" (2004), directed by Major Lightner
- "Don't Push" (2005), directed by Terry Timely
- "Soldier" (2005), directed by Lightner
- "Back to the Rebels" (2006), directed by Lightner and Javier Hernandez
