= Jeff DaRosa =

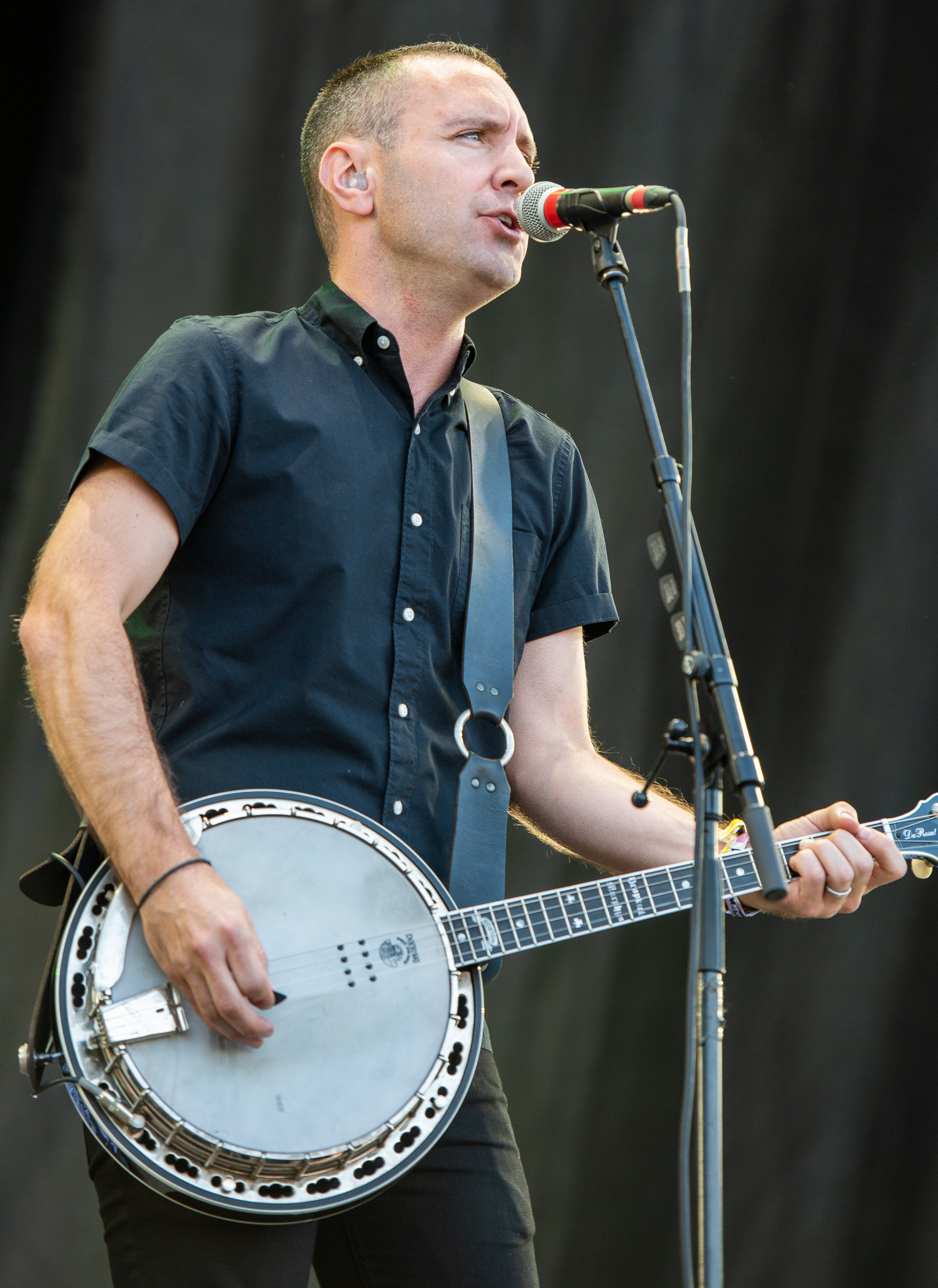
- DaRosa in 2019

Background information
- Born: Jeffrey DaRosa; July 31, 1982 (age 44); Watertown, Massachusetts, U.S.
- Genres: Celtic punk; folk punk
- Occupation: Musician
- Instruments: Guitar; bass; banjo; harmonica; mandolin; bouzouki; keyboards; tin whistle
- Years active: 2000–2010; 2012–present
- Member of: Dropkick Murphys

Jeffrey DaRosa (born July 31, 1982) is an American multi-instrumentalist musician, and occasional marathon runner, who is a member of the Boston-based Celtic punk band Dropkick Murphys.

== Early life and career ==
Growing up in Watertown, Massachusetts (a suburb of Boston) and Somerville, Massachusetts (a suburb of Boston), DaRosa later moved to New York City, where he joined The Exit.

On November 26, 2007, an announcement was made that DaRosa would be joining Boston's Dropkick Murphys after Marc Orrell left the band.

== Personal life ==
DaRosa married Michelle Nolan of Straylight Run in October 2006 and has also toured with them as a backup musician.
