= Dee Dee Ramone I.C.L.C. =

American punk rock group

- Origin: New York City, U.S.
- Genre: Punk rock
- Years active: 1994–1996
- Labels: World Service; Rough Trade
- Past members: Dee Dee Ramone; John Carco; Danny Arnold Lommen

Dee Dee Ramone I.C.L.C. (Inter-Celestial Light Commune) was an American punk rock group featuring Ramones bassist Dee Dee Ramone.

== History ==
The band was formed by Ramone and Carco in 1994 in New York City. In 1989 Dee Dee had quit performing with The Ramones, the group he co-founded, but stayed on good terms with the other Ramones and often wrote songs for the group while dabbling in other musical projects. Dee Dee and Carco quickly became friends after a chance meeting at an infamous Green Door party on St. Mark's Place in 1992. After several live shows and drummers in the three piece line up the two members decided to move to Amsterdam to record for Rough Trade Records' World Services. The four-song EP Chinese Bitch and the album I Hate Freaks Like You were both released in 1994. The band were well known for their exciting live shows and would go on to tour 22 countries in a 10-month period, though never touring the U.S. During work on their second full-length album, the band were dropped by their label. Some of those songs would eventually be recorded by the Ramones on their final album !Adios Amigos!

With this development, John Carco left the band and moved to Los Angeles where he formed the band Metro with Pete Stahl. Dee Dee Ramone formed the Ramones tribute band The Ramainz with his wife Barbara Zampini and former Ramones members Marky Ramone and C. J. Ramone.

== Members ==
- Dee Dee Ramone – vocals, guitar (1994–1996)
- Johnny Carco – bass, vocals (1994–1996)
- Danny Arnold Lommen – drums (1994–1996)

== Discography ==
- Chinese Bitch EP (1994)
- I Hate Freaks Like You (1994)
