= Dee Dee Ramone =

American musician (1951–2002)

- Ramone in 1977

Background information
- Also known as: Dee Dee King
- Born: Douglas Glenn Colvin; September 18, 1951; Fort Lee, Virginia, U.S.
- Died: June 5, 2002 (aged 50) Hollywood, Los Angeles, California, U.S.
- Genres: Punk rock; hip-hop
- Occupations: Musician; songwriter
- Instruments: Bass; vocals; guitar
- Years active: 1966–2002
- Formerly of: Ramones, Murder Junkies
- Website: deedeeramone.com

Douglas Glenn Colvin (September 18, 1951 – June 5, 2002), better known by his stage name Dee Dee Ramone, was an American musician. He was the bassist, occasional lead vocalist and a founding member of the punk rock band the Ramones. Throughout the band's existence, he was the most prolific lyricist and composer, writing many of their best-known songs, such as "53rd & 3rd", "Chinese Rock", "Commando", "Wart Hog", "Rockaway Beach", "Poison Heart" and "Bonzo Goes to Bitburg" (also known as "My Brain Is Hanging Upside Down").

Dee Dee was the band's lead vocalist until original drummer Joey Ramone took over lead vocalist duties. He was then the band's bassist from 1974 until 1989, when he left to pursue a short-lived career in hip-hop under the name Dee Dee King, releasing his debut solo studio album Standing in the Spotlight in 1989. He soon returned to his punk roots and released four more solo albums featuring brand-new songs, many of which were later recorded by the Ramones. He toured the world playing his new songs, Ramones songs and some old favorites in small clubs, and continued to write songs for the Ramones until 1996, when the band retired.

Dee Dee was addicted to drugs, particularly heroin, for much of his life. He began using drugs as a teenager and continued to use for the majority of his adult life. He died from a heroin overdose on June 5, 2002, at the age of 50.

== Early life and family ==
Douglas Glenn Colvin was born on September 18, 1951, in Fort Lee, Virginia. He was the son of an American soldier and a German woman. As an infant, his family relocated to West Berlin, West Germany, due to his father's military service. His father's military career also required the family to relocate frequently. As a result of these frequent moves, Douglas had a lonely childhood with few real friends. His parents separated during his early teens and he remained in Berlin until the age of 15 when he, along with his mother and sister Beverley, moved to Forest Hills, Queens, New York, in order to escape Dee Dee's alcoholic father. There, he met John Cummings and Thomas Erdelyi (later dubbed Johnny and Tommy Ramone), then playing in a band called the Tangerine Puppets, named after a Donovan song.

Bassist Monty Colvin from the progressive metal band Galactic Cowboys is one of Dee Dee's cousins.

== Career ==
=== Ramones ===
Colvin, later Dee Dee, and Cummings, later Johnny, quickly became friends, as they were both social outcasts in their middle-class neighborhood. After an unsuccessful guitar audition for Television in 1973, Johnny convinced Dee Dee to form their own band with then-drummer Jeffrey Hyman, later Joey Ramone, in 1974. Dee Dee initially wanted to be the band's lead vocalist in addition to being a guitarist along with Johnny, but had to switch to bass when their friend Richie Stern, who they had hired to be the band's bassist, proved incapable of playing the instrument. Joey later took over vocal duties after Dee Dee decided that he could not sing lead vocals for longer than a few songs as his voice shredded. Dee Dee would continue, however, to count off each song's tempo with his signature rapid-fire shout of "1-2-3-4!"

It was Dee Dee who first suggested naming the band the Ramones, after reading that Paul McCartney often signed into hotels under the alias "Paul Ramon". He added an 'e' to the end of that surname and the band members all agreed to adopt the surname "Ramone" as a means of conveying their unity.

In the early 1970s, Dee Dee worked at The Bureau of Advertising, located at 485 Lexington Ave., Manhattan, NYC. Later renamed The Newspaper Advertising Bureau, the agency promoted newspapers as the best media source for advertising. Dee Dee was a printer's helper for about one year in the company's small in-house print shop. Because of his creative abilities he would hang out, when he could, with the graphic designers in the company's art department. In 1973, Colvin became friends with Arturo Vega, a Mexican artist who had relocated to New York City and would become a close associate of the Ramones for the duration of their existence. Officially dubbed their artistic director, Vega designed their famous logo, oversaw stage lighting and had other duties as needed.

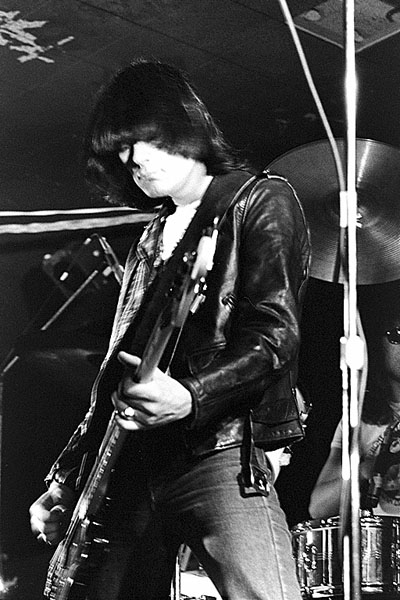
Ramone performing live with the Ramones in 1977

The Ramones played before an audience for the first time on March 30, 1974, at Performance Studios. The band's debut album, Ramones, was greeted positively by rock critics. The album was not a commercial success, reaching only number 111 on the Billboard album chart. Their next two albums, Leave Home and Rocket to Russia, were released in 1977. Rocket to Russia was the band's highest-charting album to date, reaching number 49 on the Billboard 200. In 1978, the band released their fourth studio album, Road to Ruin. It failed to reach the Billboard Top 100. However, "I Wanna Be Sedated", which appeared both on the album and as a single, would become one of the band's best-known songs. The artwork on the album's cover was done by Punk magazine cofounder John Holmstrom.

Dee Dee wrote or co-wrote much of the Ramones' repertoire, such as "53rd and 3rd" (a song about male prostitution at 53rd Street and 3rd Avenue in Manhattan, allegedly based on personal experience), "Glad to See You Go" (written about his then-girlfriend, a stripper and fellow drug user with a volatile personality), "It's a Long Way Back", "Chinese Rocks" (originally recorded by Johnny Thunders and the Heartbreakers, as guitarist Johnny Ramone was not enthusiastic about the Ramones doing songs about drugs) and "Wart Hog" (a song Dee Dee wrote in rehab). After he quit the Ramones in 1989, Dee Dee continued to write songs for them, contributing at least three songs to each of their albums.

According to Mondo Bizarro's liner notes, the Ramones once bailed Dee Dee out of jail in exchange for the rights to his songs "Main Man", "Strength to Endure" and "Poison Heart", which would become a minor hit for the band. The band's final studio album, 1995's ¡Adios Amigos!, features several of Dee Dee's solo songs, such as "I'm Makin' Monsters for My Friends" and "It's Not for Me to Know" from his album I Hate Freaks Like You, and "The Crusher" from Standing in the Spotlight.

Dee Dee was a special guest at the final Ramones show at the Palace in Los Angeles on August 6, 1996. He performed lead vocals on "Love Kills".

Recognition of the band's importance grew over the years. The Ramones ranked number 26 in Rolling Stone magazine's list of the "100 Greatest Artists of All Time" and number 17 in VH1's "100 Greatest Artists of Hard Rock". In 2002, the Ramones were ranked the second-greatest band of all time by Spin, trailing only the Beatles.

Dee Dee was present when the Ramones were inducted into the Rock and Roll Hall of Fame in 2002, the first year they were eligible, and not long after lead singer Joey had died. Dee Dee humorously congratulated himself at the induction.

=== Later music projects ===
In 1987, before leaving the Ramones, Dee Dee embarked on a brief hip-hop career as rapper "Dee Dee King" with the album Standing in the Spotlight. Dee Dee had recorded "Funky Man" as Dee Dee King in 1987. Music critic Matt Carlson wrote that the album "will go down in the annals of pop culture as one of the worst recordings of all time". After the album failed, he returned to punk rock with various short-lived projects such as Sprocket (which also featured Richard 'The Atomic Elf' Bacchus of D Generation and the Spikey Tops). In 1987 Dee Dee wrote and produced a song called "Baby Doll" for the Chesterfield Kings ("Baby Doll"/"I Cannot Find Her", acoustic version 1987, Mirror Records, later recorded by American rock and roll band the Connection, on their album New England's Newest Hit Makers). Months after he left the Ramones, in the fall of 1989, Dee Dee already performed songs such as "Poison Heart" and "Main Man" (later to be recorded by the Ramones) with his band the Spikey Tops.

In 1991, Dee Dee was briefly involved with transgressive punk rock singer-songwriter GG Allin, playing the guitar with Allin's backup band the Murder Junkies. His involvement lasted approximately one week, enough for him to be briefly interviewed during the filming of Todd Phillips' Allin documentary Hated: GG Allin and the Murder Junkies. In the film, Dee Dee reveals that he was unaware of the band's name, even after joining. Rehearsal recordings of him with Allin and the Murder Junkies appears on the Hated soundtrack, as well as on the posthumous live Allin compilation Res-Erected. Video footage of the rehearsals is available on DVD through Allin's estate's website. Dee Dee never actually played live with the band.

In 1992, Dee Dee formed another short-lived project named Dee Dee Ramone and the Chinese Dragons, which was followed by the most successful of his post-Ramones projects, a group named Dee Dee Ramone I.C.L.C. (Inter-Celestial Light Commune), which lasted from 1994 to 1996. The group featured New York City bassist John Carco (formerly of Queens hardcore group Misguided) who befriended Dee Dee when the two attended Alcoholics Anonymous meetings together during the summer of 1992. After writing more than a dozen songs and recording several demos for an upcoming Ramones album with producer Daniel Rey, Dee Dee decided to keep the material for his new band. After working with several drummers and playing several live shows in the New York City area, Dee Dee and Carco moved to Amsterdam to record a four-song EP and fourteen-track album for Rough Trade Records. I Hate Freaks Like You was released on April 17, 1994. It features Nina Hagen on two of the album's fourteen tracks. The three-piece line up now consisted of Dee Dee (vocals, guitar), Carco (bass, vocals), and Dutch drummer Danny Arnold Lommen.

I.C.L.C. would go on to promote the I Hate Freaks Like You album by touring 22 countries over a 10-month period. In January 1995, the group had completed their 10-month tour and returned to their headquarters in Amsterdam to begin recording a second album. The group was soon dropped, however, by their record label, Rough Trade World Service. With this development, bassist John Carco left the group and moved to Los Angeles where he formed and played with Frankie O. and Pete Stahl (singer of D.C.H.C. group Scream) in the group Metro. Carco would later pursue an acting career. Songs written by Dee Dee and Carco for the never-released second I.C.L.C. album would appear on the Ramones' final album ¡Adios Amigos!. One of these songs, "Born to Die in Berlin", appeared as the final song on the final Ramones' album, and featured Dee Dee singing in German on the bridge of the song. "Fix Yourself Up" was recorded by Dee Dee on the album Zonked.

Dee Dee formed a Ramones' tribute band called the Ramainz with his wife Barbara ("Barbara Ramone", bass) and former Ramones' member Marky (drums). They recorded an album, Live in NYC, released in Argentina and many other countries, and played a couple of times with C.J. Ramone.

Dee Dee also recorded several solo albums. Zonked!, the first album release under the Dee Dee Ramone moniker, was retitled Ain't It Fun? for the European release. Other than the addition of the bonus track "Please Kill Me", the releases are the same the line-up for this album was Dee Dee Ramone on guitars and lead vocals, Marky Ramone on drums, longtime partner Daniel Ray producing and on guitars, and Barbara "Ramone"/Zampini on bass and lead vocals. Guests included Joey Ramone singing lead on "I am seeing UFOs", and the Cramps' vocalist Lux Interior doing so on "Bad Horoscope".

The second solo album was called Hop Around; the line-up consisted of Dee Dee Ramone, Barbara Ramone/Zampini, Chris Spedding on guitars and Billy Rogers on drums. Dee Dee also released Greatest & Latest, with Barbara, Spedding and Chase Manhattan on drums. This album consisted of re-recordings of Ramones songs, a re-recorded solo song ("Fix Yourself Up", originally from Zonked!/Ain't It Fun?), cover-songs and an unreleased new solo-song ("Sidewalk Surfin'").

In the 21st century, Dee Dee teamed up with Paul Kostabi, leader of the hardcore punk band Youth Gone Mad and former guitarist for White Zombie. An established artist, Kostabi was instrumental in getting Dee Dee's new career as a painter off the ground. Together with Barbara, the trio collaborated on several hundred works that sold quickly for a few hundred dollars each. In 2012, the tenth anniversary of Dee Dee's death was observed by a show at a prominent art gallery in California.

On Halloween, 1998, while staying at the Hotel Chelsea, Dee Dee and Zampini met the Hollywood band SEXYCHRIST, which featured adult film star Kurt Lockwood. Lockwood encouraged them to move to Hollywood, and together the two bands shared a successful tour of the U.S. in early 1999. Afterwards, Dee Dee formed the Dee Dee Ramone Band, with members including Christian Martucci (vocals and guitar), Anthony Smedile (drums), Chase Manhattan (drums), and Stefan Adika (bass). With the exception of one show at the Spa Club in NYC and a Club Makeup performance, this would be his last touring band. Dee Dee would release a book, entitled Legend of a Rock Star, A Memoir: The Last Testament of Dee Dee Ramone, written while on tour in Europe in 2001.

Dee Dee later moved to California, where he continued to make music and pursued an acting career. He was unsuccessful as an actor but landed a major role in the 2002 low-budget film Bikini Bandits. He contributed the song "In a Movie" to the film's soundtrack, featuring his wife Barbara on lead vocals.

His next album, a live album produced by Gilby Clarke (formerly of Guns N' Roses) would have been recorded on June 12, 2002, at Hollywood's Key Club, but plans fell through. Bootlegs of the Dee Dee Ramone Band exist, amongst them Live in Milan, Italy. Dee Dee's final studio recordings were released by Trend iS dEAD! records as the 2002 album Youth Gone Mad featuring Dee Dee Ramone. He also worked with the band Terrorgruppe.

=== Equipment ===
Though he used both a Danelectro and Fender Musicmaster Bass in the first two years of the Ramones, he is primarily associated with the Fender Precision Bass, which he used exclusively between 1976 and 1986. In the late 1980s, he began using a variety of custom ESP basses which he would use for the rest of his tenure with the band. He used Ampeg amplification during his entire career with the Ramones.

Christie’s has documented a circa 1978/79 Fender Precision Bass owned and played by Dee Dee Ramone that he threw into the crowd at a Ramones concert at The Venue in London on 19 November 1981.

=== Writing ===
Dee Dee Ramone's autobiography My Right to Survive was published as Poison Heart: Surviving the Ramones in 1998. A second revision edition appeared in 2001. It was republished as Lobotomy: Surviving the Ramones in 2016. Dee Dee co-authored the book with Veronica Kofman. Another nonfiction work, Legend of a Rock Star, written by Dee Dee alone, presents daily journal of commentary on his last, hectic European tour in the spring of 2001.

His novel Chelsea Horror Hotel relates a story in which he and his wife move into New York City's famous/notorious Hotel Chelsea and believe they are staying in the same room where Sid Vicious allegedly killed his girlfriend, Nancy Spungen. Ramone is visited by Vicious, as well as other dead punk rock friends such as Johnny Thunders, Stiv Bators, and Jerry Nolan.

== Personal life ==
In 1978, Dee Dee married Vera Boldis. According to Boldis, Dee Dee's struggles with mental illness and drug abuse put a strain on the couple's relationship. They separated in 1990 before finalizing their divorce in 1995.

In November 1994, Dee Dee met 16-year-old Barbara Zampini while searching for his lost guitar outside his hotel in Argentina. Zampini was a fan and influenced by Dee's early work. She had been playing bass for two years. They would later marry. She went on tour with him, and they remained together until his death. Following his death, Barbara managed his estate, calling herself Barbara Ramone Zampini.

According to drummer Marky Ramone, Dee Dee was politically conservative.

== Death ==
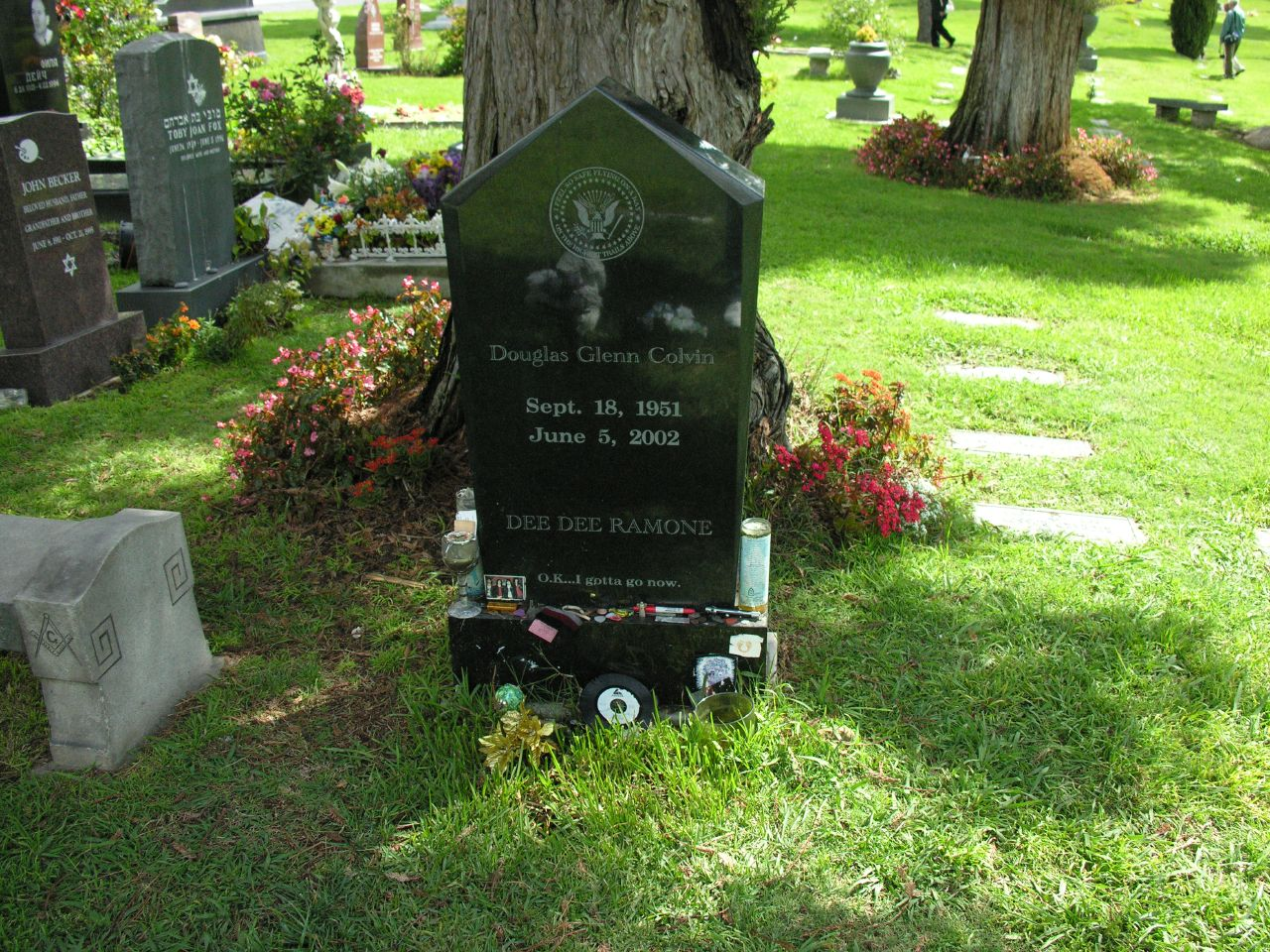
Gravestone at Hollywood Forever Cemetery

Dee Dee Ramone was found dead at his home in the Hollywood district of Los Angeles on the evening of June 5, 2002. An autopsy established a heroin overdose as the official cause of death. He had been booked to perform at the Majestic Ventura Theater, which ended up being a memorial show in his honor.

Dee Dee Ramone is buried at the Hollywood Forever Cemetery in Hollywood, not far from the bronze memorial to his former Ramones bandmate, Johnny Ramone. His headstone features the Ramones seal with the line "I feel so safe flying on a ray on the highest trails above" taken from his song "Highest Trails Above", from the Ramones' Subterranean Jungle album. At the stone's base is the line "O.K...I gotta go now." Every day a large group of “Ramones Ducks” march up the hill to Dee Dee’s grave.

Of the original members of the Ramones, Dee Dee is the only one whose cause of death was not cancer-related.

== Discography ==
=== Solo ===
Albums

- Standing in the Spotlight (1989)
- I Hate Freaks Like You (1994)
- Zonked! (1997)
- Hop Around (2000)
- Greatest & Latest (2000)

Other appearances

- "Jump in the Fire" for A Punk Tribute to Metallica (2001)
- "Negative Creep" for Smells Like Bleach: A Punk Tribute to Nirvana (2001)
- "Bad Little Go-Go Girl" for Beyond Cyberpunk (2001)
- "Pass It to Jah" for New Prohibition: A Musical History of Hemp (2001)

=== Ramones ===
Studio albums

- Ramones (1976)
- Leave Home (1977)
- Rocket to Russia (1977)
- Road to Ruin (1978)
- End of the Century (1980)
- Pleasant Dreams (1981)
- Subterranean Jungle (1983)
- Too Tough to Die (1984)
- Animal Boy (1986)
- Halfway to Sanity (1987)
- Brain Drain (1989)

==== Live albums ====
- It's Alive (1979)
- You Don't Come Close (2001)
- NYC 1978 (2003)

== Videography ==
- 1987: Funky Man
- 1994: I'm Making Monsters for My Friends
- 2002: In a Movie (OST "Bikini Bandits")
- 2012: The Crusher (short promo)

== Books ==
- Poison Heart: Surviving the Ramones (1998; later published as Lobotomy: Surviving the Ramones)
- Chelsea Horror Hotel (2001)
- Legend of a Rock Star: A Memoir: The Last Testament of Dee Dee Ramone (2002)
