= Gluecifer =

Norwegian rock band

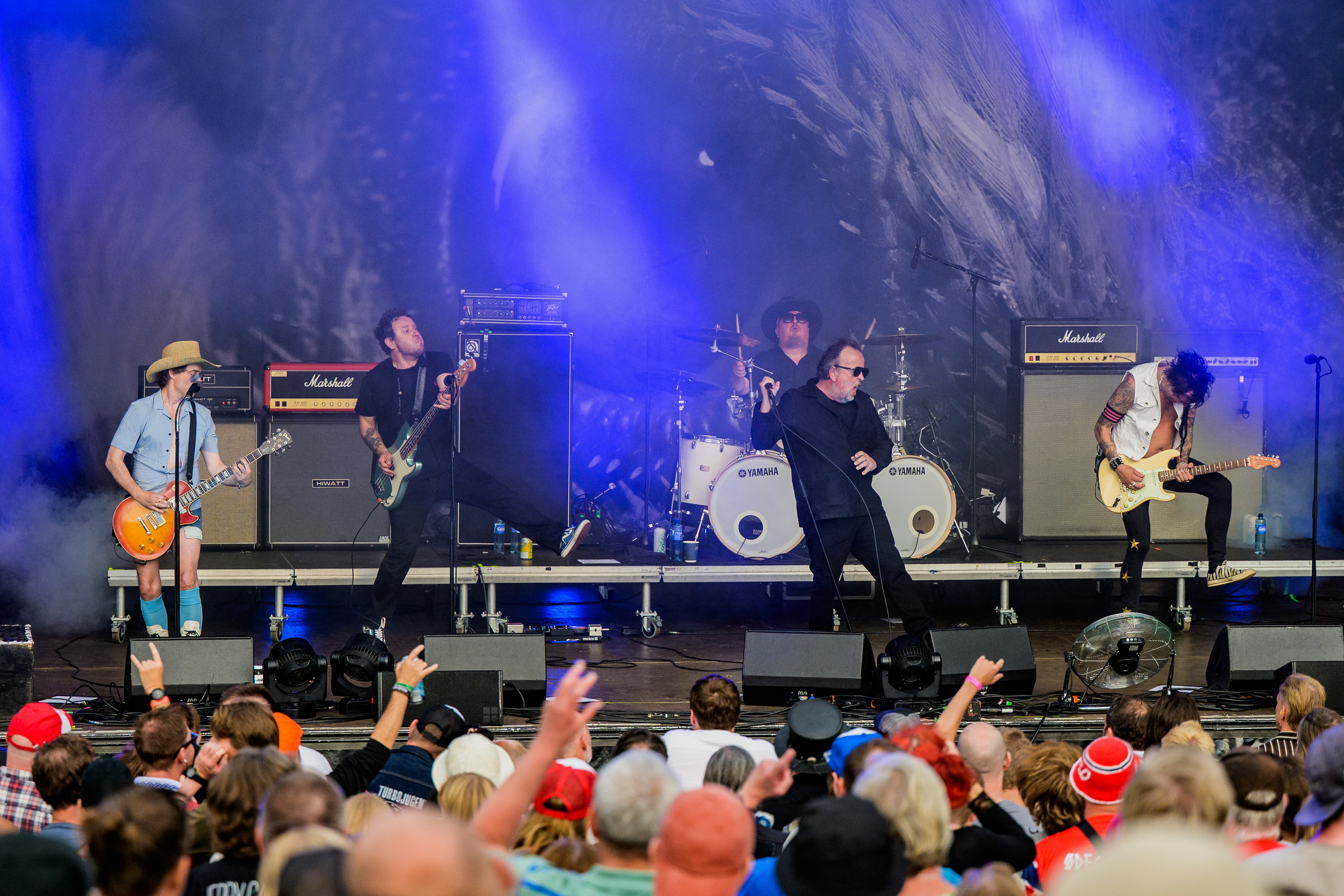
- Gluecifer at Måkeskrik, 2026

Background information
- Origin: Oslo, Norway
- Genres: Hard rock, garage rock revival
- Years active: 1994–2005, 2017–present
- Labels: White Jazz, Konkurs Productions
- Members: Biff Malibu; Captain Poon; Raldo Useless; Peter Larsson; Danny Young
- Past members: Kåre João Pedersen; Sinduru Khan; Glueros Bagfire; Jon Average; Stu Manx
- Website: https://www.gluecifer.net/

Gluecifer is a Norwegian hard rock band based in Oslo. Formed in 1994, the band gained fame as a part of the Scandinavian hard rock wave in the late 1990s and early 2000s alongside Turbonegro and The Hellacopters. Gluecifer released five studio albums before disbanding in 2005 and later reuniting in 2017.

== History ==
In 1997, the album Ridin' the Tiger (released on record label White Jazz) provided an artistic and commercial breakthrough and placed Gluecifer along Hellacopters from Sweden at the forefront of the Scandinavian hard rock wave of the late 1990s. Basement Apes, their fourth album, saw them signing with Sony Music, and Automatic Thrill became their biggest-selling record to date.

The band played at the 2004 Quart Festival as warmup for Monster Magnet.

In July 2005, the band announced their break-up.

Gluecifer counted as one of the most successful rock bands of Norway.

To the Norwegian Film Izzat Gluecifer contributed the Song Desolate City. The song was released on the compilation Kings of Rock – B-Sites and Rarities in 2008.

In 2006, Captain Poon started his new band Bloodlights.

In the film The Social Network the song Black Book Lodge can be heard as a part of the soundtrack.

On 9 October 2015, all regular studio albums by Gluecifer were re-released on Captain Poon's own label Konkurs Productions as LPs.

In 2016, Captain Poon toured as guitarist for Marky Ramone's Blitzkrieg.

In 2017, Gluecifer reunited for several festival shows in 2018 and reunion shows in their hometown Oslo.

== Members ==
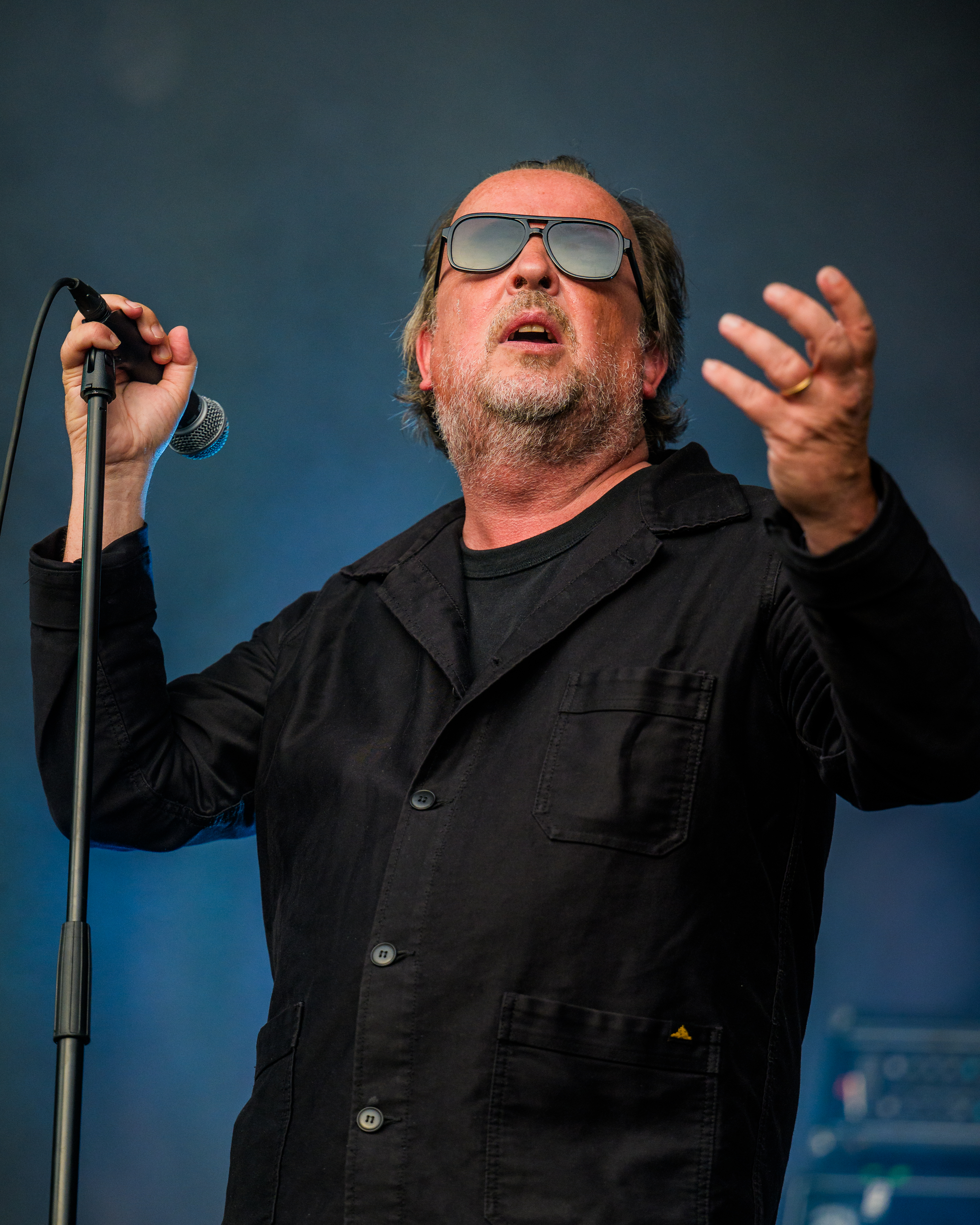
Biff Malibu

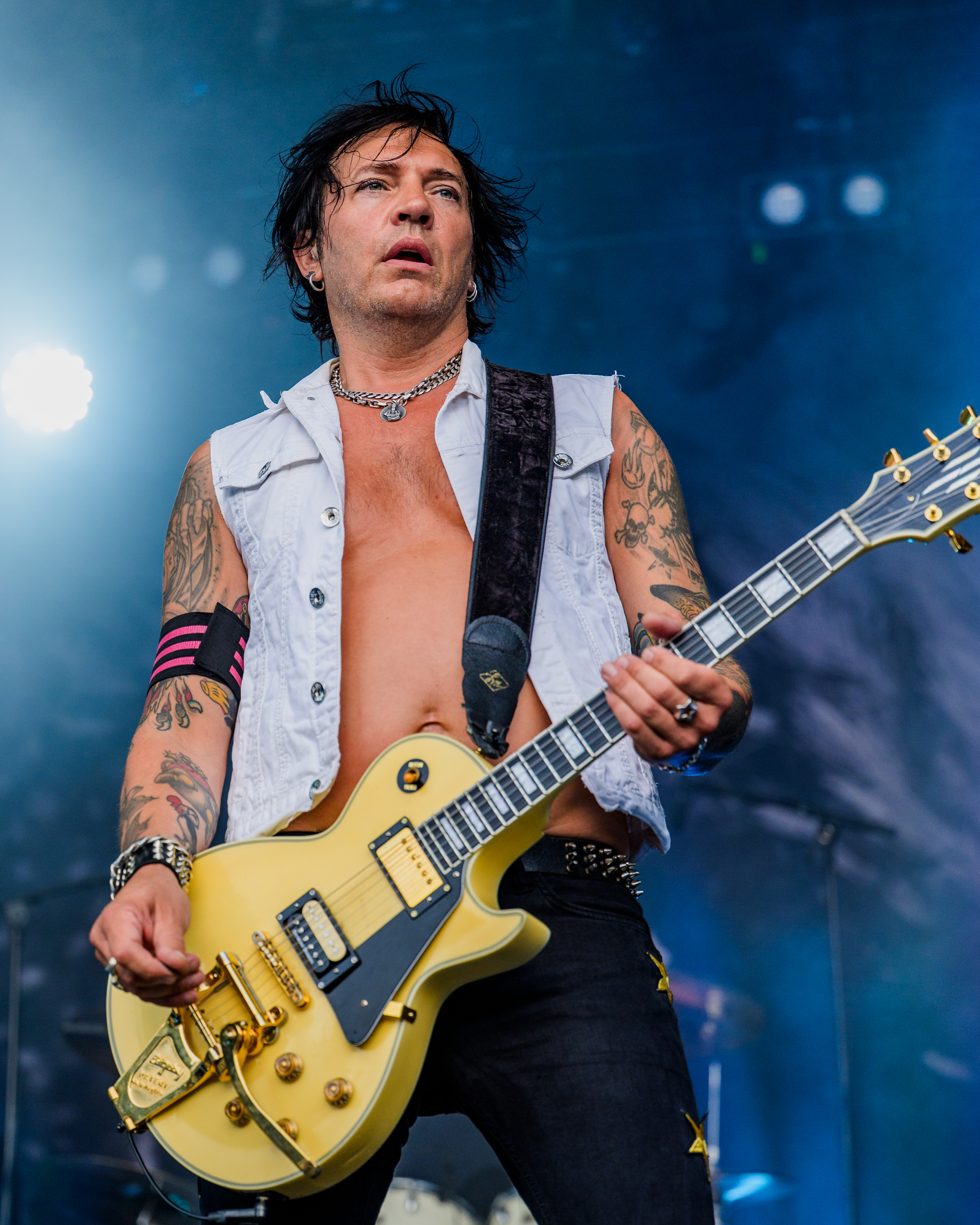
Captain Poon

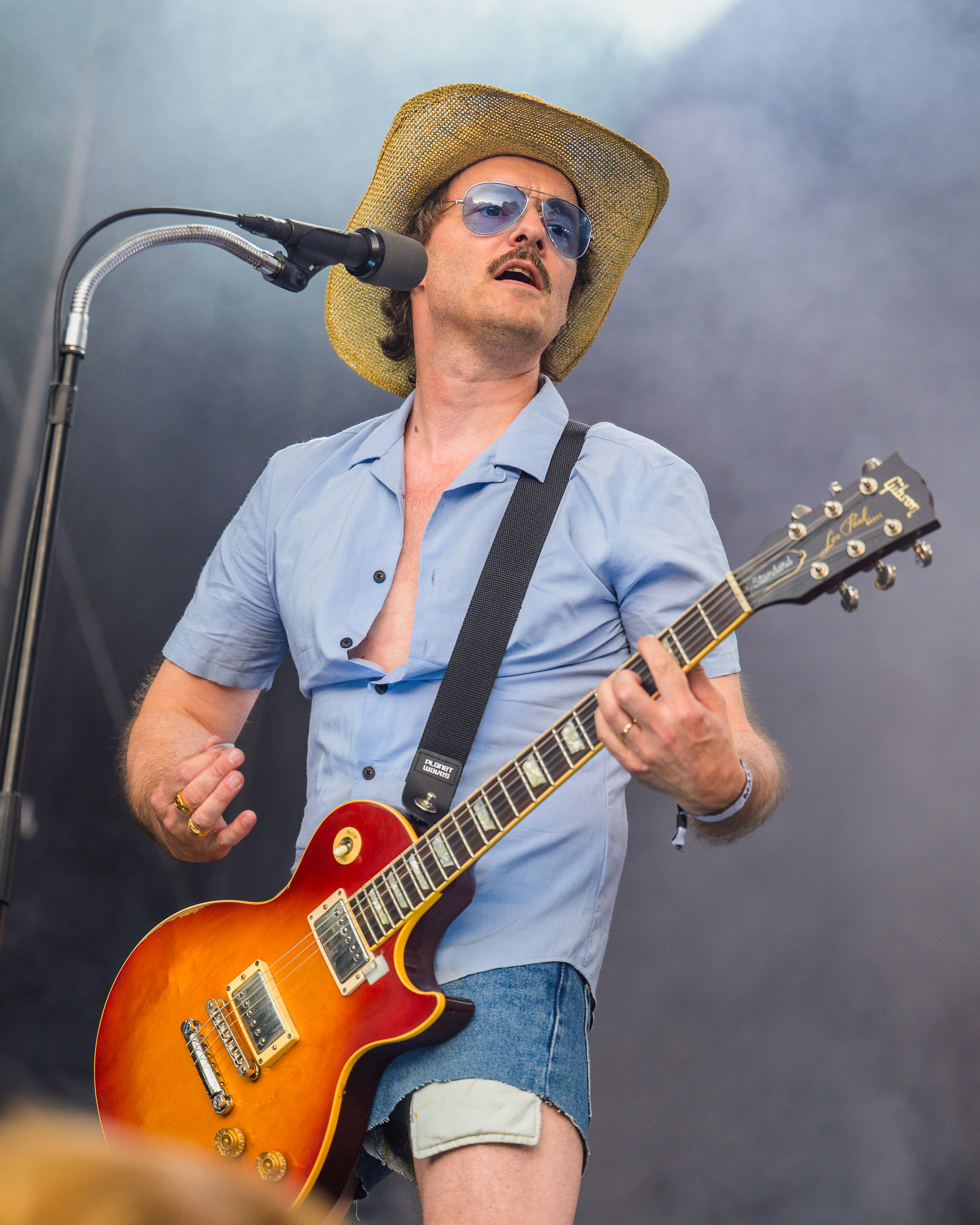
Raldo Useless

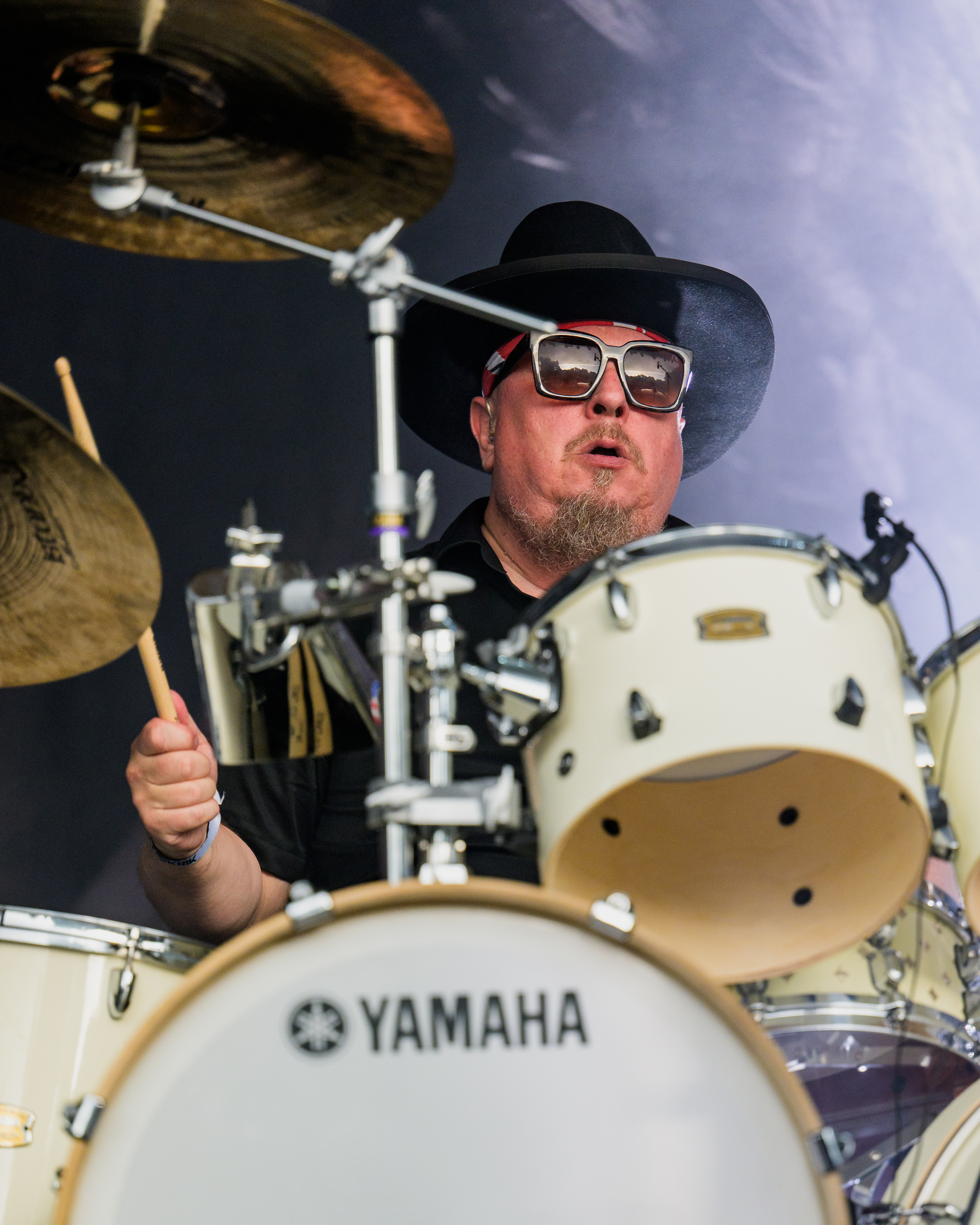
Danny Young

=== Current members ===
- Biff Malibu (Frithjof Jacobsen) – vocals (1994–2005, 2017–present)
- Captain Poon (Arne Skagen) – guitar, backing vocals (1994–2005, 2017–present)
- Raldo Useless (Rolf Yngve Uggen) – guitar, backing vocals (1996–2005, 2017–present)
- Peter Larsson – bass, backing vocals (2017–present)
- Danny Young – drums and percussion (1997–2005, 2017–present)

=== Former members ===
- Kåre João Pedersen – guitar (1994–1995)
- Sinduru Khan (Sindre Wexelsen Goksøyr) – guitar (1995–1996)
- Glueros Bagfire (Anders Møller) – drums and percussion (1994–1996)
- Jon Average (Jon Hærnes) – bass, backing vocals (1994–2000)
- Stu Manx (Stig Amundsen) – bass, backing vocals (2000–2005)

== Discography ==
=== Studio albums ===
- Ridin' The Tiger (1997)
- Soaring with Eagles at Night, to Rise with the Pigs in the Morning (1998)
- Tender Is the Savage (2000)
- Basement Apes (2002)
- Automatic Thrill (2004)
- Same Drug New High (2026)

=== Studio EPs ===
- Dick Disguised as Pussy (1996)
- Gary O'Kane (1999)
- Respect the Rock (1997)
- Respect the Rock America (1999)
- Get the Horn (2000)
- Reversed EP (2002)
- Ritual Savage (2003)

=== Compilations ===
- Nineteen Inches of Rock (1996)
- Head to Head Boredom (1999)
- B-Sides and Rarities (1994-2005) (2008)
