= Basement Apes =

Studio album by Gluecifer
- Released: 2002
- Recorded: 2000–2001
- Studio: Livingroom Studios, Oslo; Bruket Studios, Varteig; Barracuda Studios, Oslo
- Genre: Hard rock
- Length: 38:57
- Label: Sony Music Entertainment
- Producer: Kåre Christoffer Vestrheim, Gluecifer

Gluecifer chronology
Tender is the Savage (2000)	Basement Apes (2002)	Automatic Thrill (2004)

Basement Apes is the fourth album released by the Norwegian band Gluecifer. It was released in 2002 and produced by Kåre Christoffer Vestrheim and Gluecifer. The album's title is a pun on The Basement Tapes, a 1975 album by Bob Dylan and The Band. Basement Apes became the band's best-selling album in Norway, selling 17,000 copies in its first year of release, and peaked at number two on the Norwegian Charts.

== Track listing ==
All tracks are written by Gluecifer, except where noted.

No.	Title	Writer(s)	Length
1.	"Reversed"		2:52
2.	"Brutus"		2:54
3.	"Losing End"		3:22
4.	"Easy Living"		3:02
5.	"Little Man"		2:55
6.	"Not Enough for You"		2:39
7.	"Round and Round"	Gluecifer; Kåre Christoffer Vestrheim	3:40
8.	"Black Book Lodge"		3:21
9.	"It Won't Be"		4:21
10.	"Shotgun Seat"		2:23
11.	"Powertools and Piss"		3:43
12.	"I Saw the Stones Move"		3:45
Total length:			38:57

== Personnel ==
Gluecifer

- Biff Malibu – vocals
- Captain Poon – guitar, backing vocals
- Raldo Useless – guitar
- Stu Manx – bass, backing vocals
- Danny Young – drums

Additional personnel

- Kåre Christoffer Vestrheim – producer, engineer, mixer (track 8), piano, organ, mellotron, backing vocals
- Bjørn Fløystad – engineer (additional)
- Rune Elli – engineer (additional)
- Vidar Ersfjord – engineer (additional)
- Ola Haampland – engineer (additional)
- Ulf Holand – mixer (tracks 1–7, 9–12)
- Michael Hartung – assistant mixer (track 8)
- Howie Weinberg – mastering
- Line Lockert – backing vocals
- Cato Salsa – piano, organ, mellotron
- Martin Hederos – piano, organ, mellotron
- Dr. Gong – percussion
- Hector – percussion
- Kristian Dons Kirkvaag – percussion
- Sven Risnes – percussion
- Tord Risnes – percussion
- Mackan Juhlin – Gluecifer logo design
- Motorfinger – sleeve design
