= Home for an Island =

Studio album by The Exit
- Released: September 7, 2004; October 11, 2005 (re-release)
- Labels: Some; Wind-up

The Exit chronology
New Beat (2002)	Home for an Island (2004)	The Live Sessions EP (2006)

Professional ratings
Review scores
Source	Rating
AbsolutePunk	(70%) link
Allmusic	link

Home for an Island is the second studio album by The Exit. It was originally released on September 7, 2004, on Some Records. On October 11, 2005, the album was re-released by Wind-up Records with a different track list and a number of changes to the recording.

== Track listing ==
=== Some Records 2004 release ===
1. "Don't Push"
2. "Home for an Island"
3. "Tell Me All Again"
4. "Back to the Rebels"
5. "Italy"
6. "Let's Go to Haiti"
7. "Darlin"
8. "So Leave Then"
9. "Soldier"
10. "Already Gone"

=== Wind-Up Records 2005 release ===
1. "Don't Push"
2. "Let's Go to Haiti"
3. "Back to the Rebels"
4. "Home for an Island"
5. "Pressure Cooker"
6. "Tell Me All Again"
7. "The Sun Will Rise in Queens"
8. "Soldier"
9. "Warm Summer Days"
10. "Darlin"
11. "So Leave Then"
12. "Already Gone"
