= Zonked! =

Studio album by Dee Dee Ramone
- Released: 14 October 1997
- Studio: Spa Studios, New York City
- Genre: Punk rock
- Length: 35:55
- Label: Other Peoples Music (North America); Blackout! Records (Europe)
- Producer: Daniel Rey

Dee Dee Ramone chronology
I Hate Freaks Like You (1994)	Zonked! (1997)	Hop Around (2000)

Alternative cover
- European edition

Professional ratings
Review scores
Source	Rating
AllMusic	3/5 stars

Zonked!, known in Europe as Ain't it Fun?, is the third studio album by Dee Dee Ramone, released in October 1997 by Other Peoples Music. The album features contributions from former Ramones members Joey and Marky Ramone, guitarist and producer Daniel Rey, and Cramps lead singer Lux Interior. The European edition of the album contains the bonus track "Please Kill Me".

== Track listing ==
All tracks are written by Dee Dee Ramone except where noted.

No.	Title	Writer(s)	Length
1.	"I'm Zonked, Los Hombres"		1:56
2.	"Fix Yourself Up"	Ramone, John Carco	2:51
3.	"I Am Seeing UFOs"	Ramone, Daniel Rey	4:04
4.	"Get Off of the Scene"		2:10
5.	"Never Never Again"		2:39
6.	"Bad Horoscope"		2:24
7.	"It's So Bizarre"		3:32
8.	"Get Out of My Room"		2:49
9.	"Someone Who Don't Fit In"	Ramone, Rey	2:05
10.	"Victim of Society"	Ramone, Rey	2:16
11.	"My Chico"		2:38
12.	"Disguises"	Ramone, Rey	3:54
13.	"Why Is Everybody Always Against Germany"	Ramone, Rey	2:37

European bonus track
No.	Title	Length
14.	"Please Kill Me"	3:00

== Personnel ==
- Dee Dee Ramone – vocals, guitar
- Barbara Ramone – bass, lead vocals on "Never Never Again", "Get Out of My Room" and "My Chico"
- Daniel Rey – guitar, backing vocals
- Marky Ramone – drums

Additional musicians

- Joey Ramone – lead vocals on "I Am Seeing UFOs"
- Lux Interior – lead vocals on "Bad Horoscope"
- Peter Arsenault – backing vocals on "Disguises"
- Dave Thomas – drums on "Please Kill Me"
- Tim Sullivan – Farfisa organ on "Please Kill Me"

Technical

- Daniel Rey – producer
- Hillary Johnson – engineer
- Mixed at Baby Monster Studio, New York City
- Ian Bryan – mixing engineer
- Howie Weinberg – mastering
- "Please Kill Me" recorded at Brass Giraffe Studio, New York City
- Craig Randal – engineer
- Rich Tapper – assistant engineer
