= Greatest Hits (Monster Magnet album) =

Greatest hits album by Monster Magnet
- Released: September 15, 2003
- Recorded: 1993–2001
- Length: Disc 1 - 76:07; Disc 2 - 20:46 (minus music videos)
- Label: A&M

Monster Magnet chronology
Love Monster (2001)	Greatest Hits (2003)	Monolithic Baby! (2004)

Professional ratings
Review scores
Source	Rating
AllMusic	3.5/5 stars

Greatest Hits is a compilation album by American rock band Monster Magnet, released in 2003 through A&M Records. The first disc contains the band's best-known material, and includes tracks from 1991's Spine of God (albeit re-recorded) up until their 2000 release God Says No, while the second disc contains the band's music videos, a few B-sides and rarities.

== Track listing ==
=== Disc one ===
No.	Title	Originally appears on:	Length
1.	"Tractor"	Monster Magnet, re-recorded for Powertrip	3:27
2.	"Medicine"	Spine of God, re-recorded for God Says No	3:53
3.	"Dopes to Infinity"	Dopes to Infinity	5:46
4.	"Melt"	God Says No	5:45
5.	"Space Lord"	Powertrip	5:56
6.	"Powertrip"	Powertrip	3:32
7.	"Atomic Clock"	Powertrip	5:07
8.	"Heads Explode"	God Says No	3:49
9.	"Bummer"	Powertrip	7:36
10.	"Negasonic Teenage Warhead"	Dopes to Infinity	4:28
11.	"Dead Christmas"	Dopes to Infinity	3:55
12.	"Silver Future"	God Says No (bonus track)	4:59
13.	"Black Balloon"	Superjudge	3:06
14.	"Crop Circle"	Powertrip	5:33
15.	"Kiss of the Scorpion"	God Says No	4:02
16.	"Space Lord (Intergalactic 7 Remix)"	Previously unreleased	5:25
Total length:			76:07

=== Disc two ===
No.	Title	Originally appears on:	Length
1.	"Unsolid"	B-side of "Face Down"	2:51
2.	"Big God"	B-side of "Let It Ride", Powertrip (bonus track)	5:58
3.	"Into the Void" (Black Sabbath cover)	Nativity in Black II: A Tribute to Black Sabbath	8:05
4.	"I Want More"	God Says No (bonus track)	3:51
5.	"Space Lord" (video)
6.	"Powertrip" (video)
7.	"See You in Hell" (video)
8.	"Heads Explode" (video)
9.	"Twin Earth" (video)
10.	"Face Down" (video)
11.	"Negasonic Teenage Warhead" (video)
12.	"Space Lord (Intergalactic 7 Remix)" (video)

== Personnel ==
- Dave Wyndorf – vocals, guitar
- Ed Mundell – lead guitar
- Phil Caivano – guitar on tracks 2, 4, 8, 12, and 15 on first disc; tracks 3 and 4 on second disc
- Joe Calandra – bass
- Jon Kleiman – drums
