= Captain Lockheed and the Starfighters =

Studio album by Robert Calvert
- Released: 1974
- Recorded: March 1973 – January 1974
- Studios: Island (London); Olympic (London); Radio Luxembourg
- Length: 42:24
- Label: United Artists
- Producer: Roy Thomas Baker

Robert Calvert chronology
Captain Lockheed and the Starfighters (1974)	Lucky Leif and the Longships (1975)

Professional ratings
Review scores
Source	Rating
AllMusic	3/5 stars

Captain Lockheed and the Starfighters is a 1974 satirical concept album by Robert Calvert, the former frontman of British space-rock band Hawkwind. The album contains a mixture of songs and comic spoken interludes with an overall concept based on the German Air Ministry's purchase of the Lockheed F-104G Starfighter, which was eventually nicknamed Widowmaker by Luftwaffe pilots. In German service these planes had a poor safety record, with 262 out of 916 Luftwaffe Starfighters lost in accidents during the aircraft's time in service from the early 1960s until the mid-1980s.

Musicians who appeared on the album include members of Hawkwind, The Pink Fairies, Brian Eno (credited as Brian Peter George St John La Baptiste De La Salle), Arthur Brown and Adrian Wagner. The spoken sketches are primarily performed by Calvert, Viv Stanshall and Jim Capaldi.

"Ejection" (coupled with "Catch a Falling Starfighter") was released as a single, although both songs are slightly different versions to those on the album. "The Widow's Song" was included in the libretto and Calvert had hoped to record it with Nico singing. It wasn't recorded at the time but it was eventually recorded in 1984 with Calvert's wife Jill Riches on lead vocals and included on the Hawkwind, Friends and Relations Vol.3 compilation.

The album was re-released in the late 1990s by BGO Records and later became available on Eclectic Records (ECLCD1056) with bonus tracks.

== Track listing ==
All songs by Robert Calvert except where stated.

1. "Franz Josef Strauss, Defence Minister, Reviews The Luftwaffe in 1958. Finding It Somewhat Lacking in Image Potential" – 1:40
2. "The Aerospaceage Inferno" – 4:35
3. "Aircraft Salesman (A Door in the Foot)" – 1:41
4. "The Widow Maker" (Dave Brock, Calvert) – 2:42
5. "Two Test Pilots Discuss the Starfighter's Performance" – 0:41
6. "The Right Stuff" – 4:23
7. "Board meeting (Seen Through a Contract Lense)" – 0:58
8. "The Song of the Gremlin (Part One)" (Arthur Brown, Calvert, Adrian Wagner) – 3:21
9. "Ground Crew (Last Minute Reassembly Before Take Off)" – 3:17
10. "Hero with a Wing" – 3:20
11. "Ground Control to Pilot" – 0:52
12. "Ejection" – 3:35
13. "Interview" – 3:55
14. "I Resign" – 0:27
15. "The Song of the Gremlin (Part Two)" (Arthur Brown, Calvert, Adrian Wagner) – 3:10
16. "Bier Garten" – 0:38
17. "Catch a Falling Starfighter" – 2:54

=== Bonus tracks ===
1. "The Right Stuff" (extended version) – 8.07
2. "Ejection" (single version) – 3.47
3. "Catch A Falling Starfighter" (single version) – 3.00

Hawkwind has incorporated some of the songs in their live set through the years including "The Right Stuff", "Ejection", "The Widow Maker" and "The Song of the Gremlin" and they have also been recorded and included on several of their live albums and compilations.

Monster Magnet did covers of "The Right Stuff" on their 2004 album, Monolithic Baby! and "Ejection" on their 2018 album Mindfucker.

== Personnel ==
=== Musicians ===
- Robert Calvert - vocals
- Arthur Brown - vocals on "The Song of the Gremlin (Parts 1 and 2)"
- Paul Rudolph - lead and rhythm guitar (all), bass guitar on "The Song of the Gremlin (Parts 1 and 2)", "Hero with a Wing"
- Dave Brock - lead guitar on "The Widow Maker"
- Lemmy - bass guitar
- Nik Turner - saxophone
- Brian Eno (credited as Brian Peter George St John La Baptiste De La Salle) - synthesizer, electronic effects
- Del Dettmar - synthesizer
- Adrian Wagner - keyboards on "The Song of the Gremlin (Parts 1 and 2)"
- Simon King - drums
- Twink Alder - Funeral drum on "Catch a Falling Starfighter"
- The Ladbroke Grove Hermaphroditic Voice Ensemble - backing vocals

=== Actors ===
- Vivian Stanshall - most leads (e.g. Ground Control, Bright Mechanic)
- Jim Capaldi - American Salesman, Recruiting Officer, Dim Mechanic
- Robert Calvert - Pilot
- Tom Mittledorf
- Richard Elen (mis-credited as "Richard Ealing")

=== Recording ===
- Technicians: Phill Brown, Frank Owen, Rufus Cartwright, Anton Matthews, Phil Chapman
- Producer: Roy Thomas Baker
- Studios: Island, Olympic, Radio Luxembourg (dialogue) between March 1973 and January 1974
- Mixing: Trident Studios

=== Sleeve ===
- Concept: Bob Calvert
- Art Directions: Pierre Tubbs
- Illustrator: Stanislaw Ferdandes
