= 4-Way Diablo =

Studio album by Monster Magnet
- Released: November 6, 2007
- Recorded: 2006–2007
- Studio: Sound City Studios, American Studios, The Sunset Lodge and Hydeaway Studios
- Genre: Stoner rock; psychedelic rock; garage rock
- Length: 57:47
- Label: SPV
- Producer: Dave Wyndorf, Matt Hyde

Monster Magnet chronology
Monolithic Baby! (2004)	4-Way Diablo (2007)	Mastermind (2010)

Singles from 4-Way Diablo
- 1. "Wall of Fire" Released: 2007

Professional ratings
Review scores
Source	Rating
AllMusic	3.5/5 stars
The A.V. Club	(B−)
Blabbermouth.net	7/10

4-Way Diablo is the seventh studio album by American rock band Monster Magnet, released in November 2007. The album was recorded between 2006 and 2007, following frontman Dave Wyndorf's overdose on anxiolytics in February 2006. 4-Way Diablo sold 1,800 copies on its first week of release in the United States and is the band's first album since Dopes to Infinity (1995) to not feature guitarist Phil Caivano.

Following the album's release, none of its songs were included in the concert sets. According to frontman Dave Wyndorf, they were not written as live songs and he deemed them too delicate to work as such. The album includes a cover of The Rolling Stones' "2000 Light Years from Home" from their 1967 psychedelic rock album Their Satanic Majesties Request. The track "No Vacation" is a re-recording of the song "Atom Age Vampire" originally featured on the EP Love Monster, a demo collection recorded by Wyndorf in 1988.

== Track listing ==
All tracks are written by Dave Wyndorf, except where noted.

No.	Title	Length
1.	"4-Way Diablo"	3:19
2.	"Wall of Fire"	3:44
3.	"You're Alive"	4:03
4.	"Blow Your Mind"	4:27
5.	"Cyclone"	5:32
6.	"2000 Light Years from Home" (The Rolling Stones cover)	4:51
7.	"No Vacation"	5:01
8.	"I'm Calling You"	4:21
9.	"Solid Gold"	5:51
10.	"Freeze and Pixillate"	4:25
11.	"A Thousand Stars"	5:29
12.	"Slap in the Face"	4:26
13.	"Little Bag of Gloom"	2:18
Total length:		57:47

Vinyl bonus track
No.	Title	Length
14.	"Tomorrow's Sun"	5:25

== Personnel ==
- Dave Wyndorf – lead vocals, rhythm guitar
- Ed Mundell – lead guitar
- Bob Pantella – drums
- Jim Baglino – bass

== Charts ==
Chart (2007)	Peak position
German Albums Chart	81
Swedish Albums Chart	51
