= Last Patrol =

Studio album by Monster Magnet
- Released: October 15, 2013
- Genre: Space rock; psychedelic rock; garage rock
- Length: 60:58
- Label: Napalm Records
- Producer: Dave Wyndorf, Phil Caivano

Monster Magnet chronology
Mastermind (2010)	Last Patrol (2013)	Milking the Stars: A Re-Imagining of Last Patrol (2014)

Singles from Last Patrol
- 1. "Mindless Ones" Released: 2013; 2. "The Duke (of Supernature)" Released: 2013

Professional ratings
Review scores
Source	Rating
AllMusic	4/5 stars
Blabbermouth.net	9/10
Blurt	4/5 stars
Classic Rock	9/10
CraveOnline	5/10
Metal Forces	8/10
Revolver	4/5 stars
The Rockpit	4.5/5 stars
Sputnikmusic	3.5/5 stars

Last Patrol is the ninth studio album by American rock band Monster Magnet, released on October 15, 2013. It is the band's first recording since their 1991 debut album Spine of God to not feature long-time member Ed Mundell who left the band shortly after their 2010 album Mastermind. Last Patrol sold around 2,300 copies in the United States in its first week of release, peaking at number 188 on the Billboard Top 200. The band would perform the entire album for each show of the European leg in January and February 2014.

== Music and lyrics ==
Frontman Dave Wyndorf described the album as "a return to our roots in terms of vibe and recording style. It's full-on psychedelic space-rock with a '60s garage feel, recorded almost exclusively with vintage guitars, amps and effects in our hometown of Red Bank, New Jersey. The songs are a kind of space-noir, tales of cosmic revenge, peaking libidos, alienation and epic strangeness. It's a weird trip through the back alleys of a dark, retro-future, which not by coincidence very much resembles my own life. [laughs] The lyrics aren't fantasy really, rather a recounting of my musings on, observations of and general emotional reaction to my life and environment during a 1 week writing period in February of 2013. But I tend to use the vernacular and imagery of science fiction and surrealism to express myself and that's where these lyrics get trippy. There's also our cover version of Donovan's 'Three Kingfishers', which I thought fit the mood of the album."

== Track listing ==
All tracks are written by Dave Wyndorf, except where noted.

No.	Title	Writer(s)	Length
1.	"I Live Behind the Clouds"		4:25
2.	"Last Patrol"		9:23
3.	"Three Kingfishers"	Donovan	4:33
4.	"Paradise"		4:31
5.	"Hallelujah"		4:13
6.	"Mindless Ones"		5:30
7.	"The Duke of Supernature"	Dave Wyndorf, Phil Caivano	4:59
8.	"End of Time"		7:45
9.	"Stay Tuned"		5:54
Total length:			60:58

Bonus tracks
No.	Title	Length
10.	"Strobe Light Beatdown"	4:26
11.	"One Dead Moon"	5:19

== Personnel ==
- Dave Wyndorf – guitar, keyboards, vocals
- Philip Caivano – bass, guitar
- Bob Pantella – percussion, drums
- Garrett Sweeny – guitar, sitar

=== Production and art ===
- Tim Cronin – contributor
- Dave Wyndorf – producer
- Philip Caivano – producer
- Matt Hyde – additional production
- Joe Barresi – mixing
- Ryan Smith – mastering
- John Sumrow – paintings, cover art

== Chart positions ==
Chart (2013)	Peak position
Austrian Albums Chart	50
Belgian Albums Chart (VL)	100
Belgian Albums Chart (WA)	198
Finnish Albums Chart	43
Swiss Albums Chart	44
US Billboard 200	188
