= Space Lord =

Single by Monster Magnet

from the album Powertrip
- Released: June 16, 1998
- Studio: North Vine Studios, NRG Studios
- Genre: Stoner rock; hard rock; psychedelic rock
- Length: 5:55
- Label: A&M
- Songwriter: Dave Wyndorf
- Producers: Dave Wyndorf, Matt Hyde

Monster Magnet singles chronology
"Dead Christmas" (1998)	"Space Lord" (1998)	"Powertrip" (1998)

"Space Lord" is a 1998 single by American rock band Monster Magnet from the album Powertrip. The song is in the key of C minor. It brought them mainstream success, with its accompanying music video directed by Joseph Kahn. The song peaked at number three on the Billboard Mainstream Rock Songs chart, and number twenty-nine on the Billboard Alternative Songs chart. A remixed version of the song was also made, and was featured (along with the original) on their compilation album Greatest Hits. The music video is notable for being the first video ever aired on MTV's Total Request Live on September 14, 1998. It appeared on the countdown five times climbing no higher than the No. 7 position.

The line "Space lord, motherfucker" was truncated and an echo added to make the song more radio- and TV-friendly (the lyric is heard as "Space lord, mother, mother"), but the vocal rhythm is unchanged, and a band version with the original lyric has never been released. The original lyric can be heard uncensored on the "Intergalactic 7 Remix" on international releases of the aforementioned Greatest Hits album and also on the unofficial Boys Noize "Monster Bootnet" remix.

== Background ==
Singer Dave Wyndorf told Kerrang, "I'd hurt my knee, and had time off, so spent it in a dominatrix's apartment in New Orleans. Our record company forwarded me press from Europe and in Germany they called me 'Space Lord'. She saw it and took the piss, saying 'So you think you're the space lord?' I said, 'Someday when I can walk. I'll make you pay for taunting me by writing a song.'"

== Music video ==
The music video was an unintended spoof of the music video for the single "Feel So Good" by rapper Mase, while the opening of the video is an homage to Metallica's "Enter Sandman" video. Twiggy Ramirez appeared as a guest star in the video.

The basic concept for the video came from Wyndorf. He felt the only rock stars of the current era were in the rap genre. He instructed Kahn to make them a flashy rap video in Las Vegas. Kahn was eager to please and accommodated the request by tracking down locations Hype Williams had used in a recent video he had done for Mase. He even wound up recreating certain scenes shot-for-shot. When Wyndorf realized how much of the video was a direct reference he became worried Mase would be upset but Mase didn't mind and was even amused when he saw the video.

== Charts ==
Chart (1998)	Peak position
US Alternative Airplay (Billboard)	29
US Mainstream Rock (Billboard)	3

UK: #45
