= Cobras and Fire (The Mastermind Redux) =

Remix album by Monster Magnet
- Released: October 9, 2015
- Genre: Garage rock; psychedelic rock
- Length: 63:48
- Label: Napalm Records
- Producer: Dave Wyndorf, Phil Caivano

Monster Magnet chronology
Milking the Stars: A Re-Imagining of Last Patrol (2014)	Cobras and Fire (The Mastermind Redux) (2015)	Mindfucker (2018)

Professional ratings
Review scores
Source	Rating
AllMusic	3.5/5 stars
PopMatters	7/10
The Rockpit	4/5 stars
Sputnikmusic	3.5/5 stars

Cobras and Fire (The Mastermind Redux) is a redux studio album by the American rock band Monster Magnet, released on October 9, 2015. The album is a reworking of material previously included on their album 2010 Mastermind. It is the band's second release focusing on reworking material from a studio album following their 2014 remix album Milking the Stars: A Re-Imagining of Last Patrol. In regards to the album, Dave Wyndorf told Blabbermouth:

"With 'Cobras And Fire', I wanted to present these songs in a much stranger and dirtier atmosphere. Less 'classic rock' and more… well, I'd guess I'd call it a deranged fusion of garage-psych, fuzz punk and movie soundtrack music. It's almost completely re-recorded and, as in 'Milking The Stars', I've added organ, piano, sitars and more to flesh out a completely new sound for these tunes."

== Track listing ==
No.	Title	Length
1.	"She Digs That Hole"	5:48
2.	"Watch Me Fade"	3:06
3.	"Mastermind '69"	6:28
4.	"Cobras and Fire (Hallucination Bomb)"	9:16
5.	"Gods, Punks, and the Everlasting Twilight"	6:57
6.	"The Titan"	3:48
7.	"When the Planes Fall from the Sky (Sitar and Psych Version)"	5:50
8.	"Ball of Confusion" (The Temptations cover)	7:23
9.	"Time Machine"	6:18
10.	"I Live Behind the Paradise Machine: Evil Joe Barresi's Magnet Mash Vol. 1"	8:54
Total length:		63:48

== Personnel ==
- Dave Wyndorf – guitar, keyboards, vocals
- Philip Caivano – bass, guitar
- Bob Pantella – percussion, drums
- Garrett Sweeny – guitar
- Tim Cronin – backing vocals on "Ball of Confusion"
- Jeff Levine – organ on "Watch Me Fade" and "Mastermind '69"
- Robert Ryan – tambora on "Cobras and Fire (Hallucination Bomb)"
