= Mastermind (Monster Magnet album) =

Studio album by Monster Magnet
- Released: October 25, 2010
- Genre: Space rock; stoner rock; psychedelic rock; hard rock
- Length: 66:23
- Label: Napalm Records
- Producer: Dave Wyndorf, Matt Hyde

Monster Magnet chronology
4-Way Diablo (2007)	Mastermind (2010)	Last Patrol (2013)

Singles from Mastermind
- 1. "Gods and Punks" Released: 2010; 2. "100 Million Miles" Released: 2011

Professional ratings
Review scores
Source	Rating
About.com	3.5/5 stars
AllMusic	3/5 stars
Blabbermouth.net	8/10
The Guardian	3/5 stars
Jukebox:Metal	4/5 stars
PopMatters	7/10

Mastermind is the eighth studio album by American rock band Monster Magnet, released on October 25, 2010. It debuted at No. 165 on the Billboard 200 selling around 3,000 copies, becoming the band's first album since 2001's God Says No to chart on the Billboard 200. Mastermind was the final album to feature long-time lead guitarist Ed Mundell and bassist Jim Baglino. The album marked the return of guitarist Phil Caivano after his four-year hiatus. A video for the first single, "Gods and Punks", was released on October 1, 2010.

== Track listing ==
All tracks are written by Dave Wyndorf, except where noted.

No.	Title	Writer(s)	Length
1.	"Hallucination Bomb"		5:27
2.	"Bored with Sorcery"		4:02
3.	"Dig That Hole"	Dave Wyndorf, Phil Caivano	5:34
4.	"Gods and Punks"		5:32
5.	"The Titan Who Cried Like a Baby"		3:36
6.	"Mastermind"		5:08
7.	"100 Million Miles"		5:01
8.	"Perish in Fire"		4:42
9.	"Time Machine"		5:30
10.	"When the Planes Fall from the Sky"		5:46
11.	"Ghost Story"		5:20
12.	"All Outta Nothin'"		4:29
Total length:			66:23

Bonus tracks
No.	Title	Length
13.	"Watch Me Fade"	3:05
14.	"Fuzz Pig"	3:13

== Personnel ==
- Dave Wyndorf – guitar, vocals
- Philip Caivano – guitar
- Ed Mundell – guitar
- Bob Pantella – drums
- Jim Baglino – bass

=== Production and art ===
- Matt Hyde – producer, engineer
- Dave Wyndorf – producer, art direction
- Philip Caivano – engineer, additional production
- Chris Rakestraw – engineer
- Tom Baker – mastering
- Ryan Clark – illustrations

== Charts ==
Chart (2010)	Peak position
Austrian Albums Chart	70
Swedish Albums Chart	34
Swiss Albums Charts	84
UK Albums Chart	192
UK Indie Chart	18
US Billboard 200	165
US Indie Chart	23
US Rock Albums	47
US Hard Rock Albums	14
