= Unicorn (English band) =

English country rock band

- Also known as: The Late
- Origin: Send, Surrey, England
- Genres: Alternative country; country rock; folk rock; soft rock
- Years active: 1971–1977
- Labels: Transatlantic; Charisma; Harvest
- Past members: Ken Baker; Pat Martin; Trevor Mee; Pete Perryer; Kevin Smith
- Website: Facebook group

Unicorn were an English country rock band, notable for their association with David Gilmour of Pink Floyd from 1973.

== History ==
=== 1963–1972 ===
Although Unicorn didn't release their first album until 1971, most of the group had been playing together since 1963 under various band names, including The Senders, The Pink Bears, The Late Edition, The Late, and Late. They started as a beat group and focused on playing covers of bands like The Beatles, The Searchers and The Hollies but began writing their own material from 1967, with Ken Baker as the songwriter.

In the early years they also found work backing other singers, including Sue and Sunny. After recording a number of their songs in 1967 they got a month-long residency at the Carousel Club in Copenhagen and then nine months touring as Billy J. Kramer's backing band.

Inspired by the 1969 Crosby, Stills & Nash album, they began developing their country-rock sound and it was demos in this style which their manager (Pat Martin's father, also called Pat) used to secure them a deal with Transatlantic to record an album. The label insisted on a change of name and Unicorn's first album, Uphill All the Way, was released in 1971 along with a single, "P.F. Sloan". In the same year they were the support act for Lindisfarne at the Royal Festival Hall. This was followed by a tour of Britain supporting Stefan Grossman and other gigs arranged by Transatlantic, including supporting Quiver at the Roundhouse.

In 1972 the band's guitarist, Trevor Mee (who had rehearsed with Tony Rivers and the Castaways before joining the band), left Unicorn to move to Guernsey, having met a woman there during their series of gigs in the Channel Islands. He was replaced by Kevin Smith, who had previously played with Camel. There were then a couple of disappointing tours of Italy and Sweden, although the band had more success in The Netherlands, including on a television show opening for The Flying Burrito Brothers.

=== 1973–1977 ===
In early 1973 they played at the wedding of former Transatlantic records publicist Ricky Hopper. At the end of that evening one of the guests, Pink Floyd's David Gilmour, jumped up on stage and began jamming with them on Neil Young's "Heart of Gold". Gilmour recalls that, "Their playing was spot-on, and the harmonies perfect". A week later Gilmour invited them to record at his new home studio, after which he agreed to finance the recording of a new Unicorn album and they were taken on by Steve O'Rourke's management company EMKA.

The resulting album, recorded at Olympic Studios, was Blue Pine Trees. Gilmour was the producer and also pedal steel guitarist. The artwork for this and Unicorn's subsequent two albums was designed by Hipgnosis. The album was sold to Charisma Records in the UK, Capitol Records in the US, and EMI International for the rest of the world.

In August 1973 two of the band's members, Pat Martin and Pete Perryer, played on Kate Bush's first recording session at David Gilmour's studio. The session fee was a meatloaf made by Gilmour’s then wife, Ginger.

Unicorn toured the United States in the fall of 1974, the first night of which they headlined at the Whisky a Go Go on Sunset Strip and were supported by Patti Smith. During the tour they supported a range of different acts including Fleetwood Mac, Billy Joel, Doobie Brothers and Linda Ronstadt. Blue Pine Trees went to No. 3 on Billboard's FM Action chart in late October 1974.

1975 was mainly spent recording their third album, Too Many Crooks (Released in America as Unicorn 2). Produced again by David Gilmour, it was recorded at Olympic Studios and mixed at Air Studios. Released on EMI's Harvest label, it featured the song "No Way Out of Here" which was covered by David Gilmour in 1978 for his first solo album, David Gilmour. The song has also been recorded by stoner rock band Monster Magnet for their 2004 album Monolithic Baby! and by Iron & Wine and Ben Bridwell for their 2015 covers album Sing into My Mouth.

Unicorn were the support act for a number of well-known bands during this period, including John Entwistle on his 1975 tour, and Hawkwind, Nils Lofgren and Steeleye Span in 1976. They also supported two UK tours for Dr. Hook in 1975 and 1976.

They were the first group to use Pink Floyd's new Britannia Row Studios when they began recording their fourth album. It was half-produced by David Gilmour and, after he had to go on tour with Pink Floyd, the remaining tracks were produced by Muff Winwood, who was brought on in an attempt to make the album more commercial. One More Tomorrow was released by Harvest in 1977. The album's single, "Slow Dancing", was Record of the Week on Johnnie Walker's BBC show, as "Ooh Mother" and "Disco Dancer" had been previously.

The band had a few more gigs but by this time the growth of punk had made Unicorn's country rock unfashionable. As David Gilmour has suggested, "they just weren't prepared to compromise their music to better fit into the competitive world of popular music". Harvest Records ended Unicorn's contract in 1977 and their last performance was at The Music Machine in Camden Town, to an audience that was so small the band cut the performance short. There was talk at this stage of the band moving to America, where their sound might have had a bigger audience, but this was never realized.

In recent years previously unreleased material has been made available, including the original 1973–1974 demos produced by David Gilmour (Laughing Up Your Sleeve, 2018) and from their early days as The Late (Songs from the Family Tree, 2008).

In 2020 the Unicorn song "Ooh Mother" featured on the soundtrack of the NBC series Good Girls (season 3, episode 11).

== Discography ==
=== Albums ===
- Uphill All the Way (Transatlantic, 1971)
- Blue Pine Trees (Charisma, late 1974)
- Too Many Crooks (Harvest, 1975), released in North America as Unicorn 2
- One More Tomorrow (Harvest, 1977)

Compilations

- The Best of Unicorn (2000)
- Shed No Tear: The Shed Studio Sessions (2002, demos from 1977)
- Songs from the Family Tree (2008, recordings from 1967–69 as The Late)
- No Way Out Of Here - The Anthology (2009)
- Laughing Up Your Sleeve (2018, previously unissued recordings produced by David Gilmour, 1973–74)
- Slow Dancing: The Recordings, 1974-1979 (2020, boxed set with a disc of previously unreleased archive material)
- Shed No Tear The Early Late Unicorn (2024)

=== Singles ===
- "P.F. Sloan" (1971)
- "Cosmic Kid" (1973)
- "Ooh Mother" (1974)
- "I'll Believe In You (The Hymn)" (1975)
- "Disco Dancer" (1976)
- "Slow Dancing" (1977)
- "Have You Ever Seen The Rain" (1977)
