= Negasonic Teenage Warhead (song) =

Single by Monster Magnet

from the album Dopes to Infinity
- Released: 1995
- Studio: Magic Shop, New York City
- Genre: Stoner rock; grunge
- Length: 4:28; 5:00 (S.F.W. version)
- Label: A&M
- Songwriter(s): Dave Wyndorf
- Producer(s): Dave Wyndorf, Steve Rosenthal

Monster Magnet singles chronology
"Cage Around the Sun" (1993)	"Negasonic Teenage Warhead" (1995)	"Dopes to Infinity" (1995)

"Negasonic Teenage Warhead" is the second track on Monster Magnet's 1995 album, Dopes to Infinity. It became the band's first successful single.

== History ==
"Negasonic Teenage Warhead" was the first song recorded by Monster Magnet after the release of their previous album Superjudge because a five-minute version of it had to appear in the 1994 movie S.F.W. The version of the song which appeared on the album was recorded at The Magic Shop in New York City. It was released in its album, Dopes to Infinity, and as a single, the first one of the album, (with a version of 4:23 minutes) in 1995. The song would become the band's first hit single, garnering play on modern rock radio and MTV. The 1999 Japanese reissue of Dopes to Infinity includes a live version of the song.

=== Albums where it has been featured ===
The track was later included on the two Monster Magnet's greatest hits albums: Greatest Hits and 20th Century Masters - The Millennium Collection: The Best of Monster Magnet. It was also featured in a CD which includes an interview of Dave Wyndorf by Sean Yseult. S.F.W.'s soundtrack album also has the song. The compilation album Unstoppable 90's: Alternative also featured the song.

== Title and meaning of the lyrics ==
According to Dave Wyndorf, the writer, he chose such a curious title for the song because it deals with those rock stars who, from his point of view, always seem to be negative (hence the word "negasonic" in the title) and apparently hate being what they are; more specifically, grunge musicians. He wanted to show with the song that he doesn't like artists whose lyrics always deal with depression, unhappiness, and such things. However, he doesn't see the song as a manifesto.

== Video ==
The video of the song, which featured the work of director Gore Verbinski and film editor Craig Wood shows all members of Monster Magnet performing ordinary activities on asteroids while they are being watched by an enormous woman. As the clip goes on, the members of the band begin trashing the things on their asteroids, whose stability begins to wane. Then, Dave Wyndorf is shown moving his hands around the Earth. At the end all members are seen riding a car through space.

It was featured on MTV's Beavis & Butt-head and was included on the first volume of the three-DVD sets called Beavis and Butt-Head: The Mike Judge Collection. The single for "I Talk to Planets" features it as well.

== Single ==
The song had several releases as a single. A live version of the song was also released as a B-side for "Dead Christmas".

Label	Year	Format	B-sides	Notes	Source
A&M Records	1994	CD single	—	S.F.W. version	
A&M Records	1995	CD single	"Eclipse This" "Third Alternative" "Look to Your Orb for the Warning"	The song "Eclipse This" hadn't been available previously.	
A&M Records	1995	7" vinyl picture disc	"Eclipse This"	—	
A&M Records	1995	CD single	"Murder" (live BBC) "Superjudge" (live BBC) "Blow 'em Off" (spaghetti western mix) "Eclipse This" "Third Alternative" (edit) "Look to Your Orb for the Warning"	Double CD single; the song is featured in both discs.	

=== Chart performance ===
Released during the era of grunge, when Monster Magnet's retro-rock style was highly unfashionable, the song didn't attract enough attention of radio stations so it was only a moderate hit. It charted in the United States.

Year	Chart	Position
1995	US Mainstream Rock (Billboard)	19
	US Alternative Airplay (Billboard)	26

== In popular culture ==
The X-Men character who shares a name with this song was named after this song. Her creator, Grant Morrison, has admitted being indebted to Monster Magnet.
