= Dave Wyndorf =

American rock musician (born 1956)

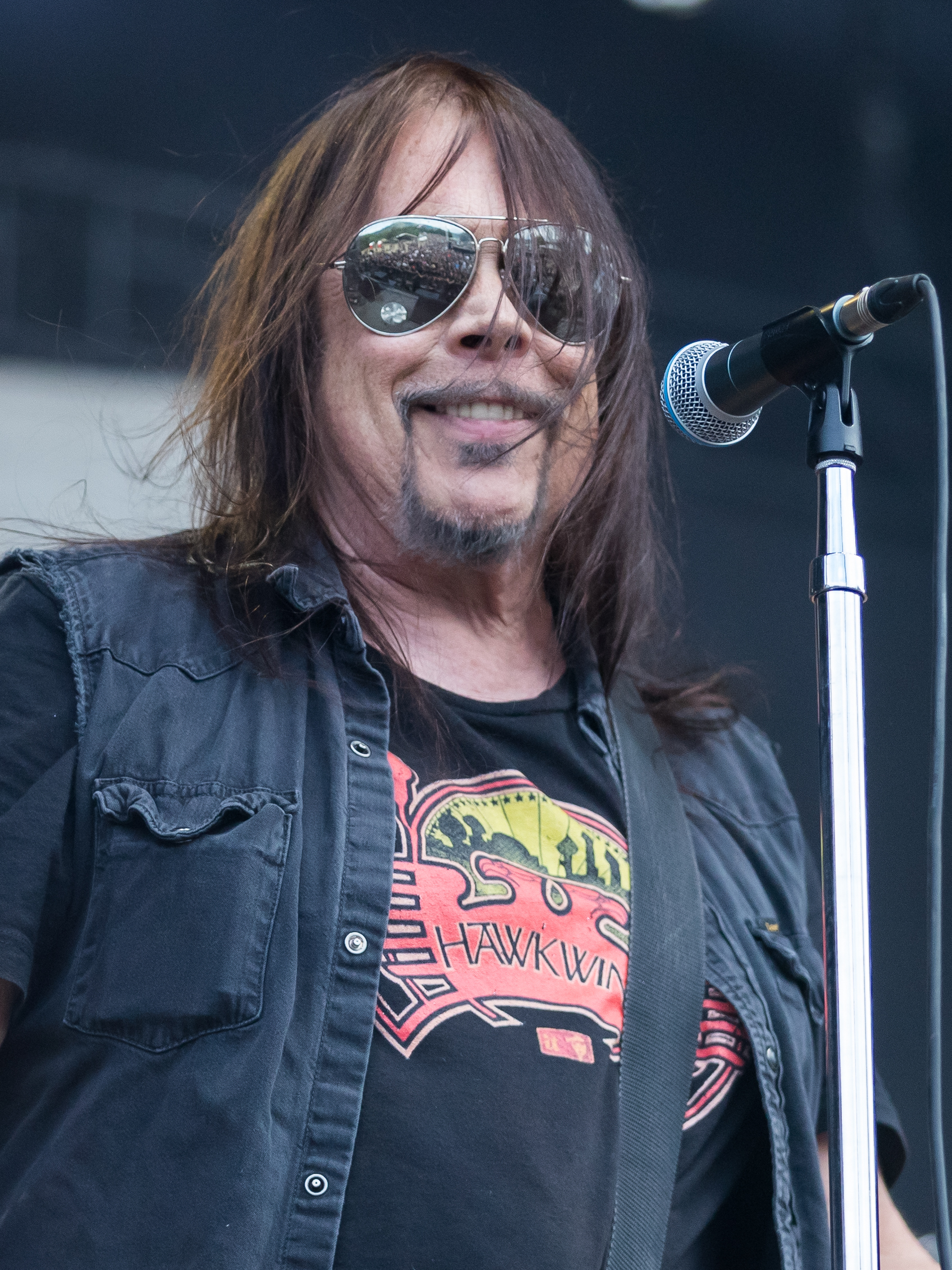
- Wyndorf performing in 2023

Background information
- Born: David Albert Wyndorf; October 28, 1956 (age 70); Red Bank, New Jersey, U.S.
- Genres: Stoner rock; space rock; hard rock
- Occupations: Singer; musician; songwriter
- Instruments: Vocals; guitar
- Years active: 1978–present
- Member of: Monster Magnet
- Formerly of: Shrapnel

David Albert Wyndorf (born October 28, 1956) is an American musician, best known as the lead vocalist and rhythm guitarist of hard rock band Monster Magnet. He is the band's frontman, songwriter and only remaining founding member. Monster Magnet has released eleven studio albums and is considered one of the pioneers of the stoner rock genre. Prior to forming Monster Magnet, Wyndorf was the frontman of punk band Shrapnel.

== Early life ==
Wyndorf was born in Red Bank, New Jersey on October 28, 1956 and grew up in a family of eight children. Although the family was poor, Wyndorf has stated that his childhood was idyllic. Wyndorf started attending concerts at age 14 and joined his first band as a singer while in high school.

== Career ==
From the late 1970s to the early 1980s, Wyndorf fronted the punk band Shrapnel, releasing two singles, "Combat Love" and "Go Cruisin'", and a five-song self-titled EP on Elektra Records. In 1980, the band made a cameo appearance in an issue of The Amazing Spider-Man Annual written by Dennis O’Neil and drawn by Frank Miller. After learning how to play guitar, Wyndorf started writing songs and formed a new project called Love Monster. He later joined the band Dog of Mystery, which would eventually become Monster Magnet.

Monster Magnet released their debut album, Spine of God, in 1991. The album was praised by critics upon release and is considered a major influence on stoner rock bands. The band's second album, Superjudge, was released in 1993 through major label A&M Records. Although the album was not a commercial success, it would become an influential release in the stoner rock genre like its predecessor. With the release of Monster Magnet's third studio album, Dopes to Infinity, in 1995, the band achieved their first hit single with the song "Negasonic Teenage Warhead". Following the band's tour in support of the album, Wyndorf traveled to Las Vegas for 21 days where he wrote the songs for the band's next album, Powertrip. Released in 1998, the album would become Monster Magnet's commercial breakthrough, spearheaded by the single "Space Lord". Peaking at number 97 on the Billboard 200, Powertrip was certified gold by the RIAA in January 1999 and became a multi-platinum record. The band followed-up the album with God Says No in 2000, with Wyndorf's life following the success of Powertrip serving as inspiration for the new songs. Although God Says No reached number 153 on the Billboard 200, promotional support by the band's label was lacking and the album polarized fans. After being dropped by A&M, Monster Magnet's sixth studio album, Monolithic Baby!, was released through German independent label SPV in May 2004. The album was considered a rebirth for the band, with the sound described as a "strip down (...) to its familiarly aggressive, in-your-face, though still eclectic manifesto."

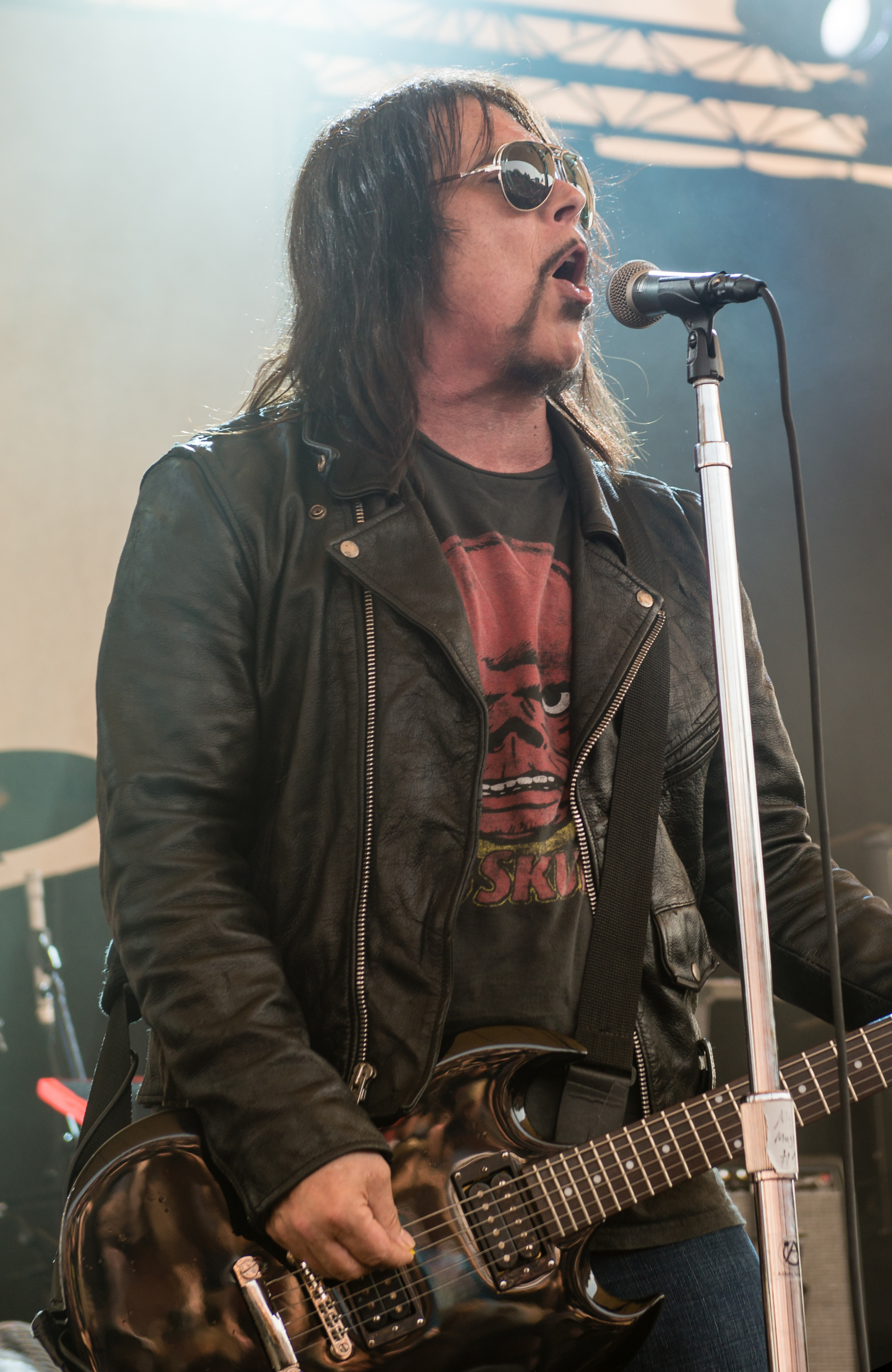
Wyndorf with Monster Magnet in 2014

On February 27, 2006, Wyndorf overdosed on prescription drugs. An upcoming European tour for Monster Magnet was subsequently canceled. His management released the following statement:

"The battle with one's inner demons is the most personal fight any of us can undertake. The fight is at times a lonely, confusing journey. On the evening of February 27, Dave Wyndorf suffered a setback in his own fight and was hospitalized due to a drug overdose. His full recovery is expected. We ask that all those he has encountered over the years or simply affected by his music to take a moment to think good thoughts of and for him and his family. With the grace of God and those who love him we are all confident that Dave will rebound from this setback and continue to play and make great rock and roll."

More than a year later, in September 2007, Wyndorf spoke to UK-based music journalist Dave Ling about his overdose. He stated that he was prescribed anxiolytics due to suffering from insomnia while touring, which he began to use regularly. Wyndorf further explained that the drugs strengthened his mental problems once their effect wore off and while feeling very weak one day, he consumed a full bottle of sleeping pills, causing the overdose. Following his overdose, Wyndorf began working on Monster Magnet's next album, 4-Way Diablo, released in November 2007.

After extensive touring in 2008 and 2009, Monster Magnet returned to the studio to record new material. The album Mastermind was released in October 2010, peaking at number 165 on the Billboard 200. During Monster Magnet's tours in 2011 and 2012, the band performed the albums Dopes to Infinity and Spine of God in their entirety. The band's ninth studio album, Last Patrol, was released in October 2013. Wyndorf later described the band's recent albums as "long-form psych records that were decidedly melancholy" and made a return to a more rock-oriented sound for their 2018 album Mindfucker. In May 2021, Monster Magnet released the album A Better Dystopia, consisting of cover songs by psychedelic rock and garage rock bands of the 1960s and 1970s.

== Personal life ==
Having spent most of his career writing about drugs, Wyndorf now upholds that drugs are not an inspiration for music nor a gateway into creativity. In a 1995 interview, Wyndorf stated that legalizing mushrooms in America might be a bad idea, stating "Americans have been so suppressed for so long that given that kind of freedom they would tend to abuse it."

He is not married nor has any children.

== Discography ==
=== With Monster Magnet ===
Studio albums

- Spine of God (1991)
- Superjudge (1993)
- Dopes to Infinity (1995)
- Powertrip (1998)
- God Says No (2000)
- Monolithic Baby! (2004)
- 4-Way Diablo (2007)
- Mastermind (2010)
- Last Patrol (2013)
- Mindfucker (2018)
- A Better Dystopia (2021)

Studio EPs

- Monster Magnet (1990)
- Tab (1991)
- Love Monster (2001)

Remix/redux albums

- Milking the Stars: A Re-Imagining of Last Patrol (2014)
- Cobras and Fire (The Mastermind Redux) (2015)

Compilation albums

- It's a Satanic Drug Thing...You Wouldn't Understand (1992)
- Greatest Hits (2003)
- The Best of Monster Magnet – The Millennium Collection (2007)
- Space Lords (2012)

=== With Shrapnel ===
Studio EPs

- Shrapnel (1984)

=== Other appearances ===
- We Will Fall: The Iggy Pop Tribute (1997) – "Gimme Danger"
- For the Masses (1998) – "Black Celebration"
- Nativity in Black II (2000) – "Into the Void"
- New Tales to Tell: A Tribute to Love and Rockets (2009) – "Mirror People"
