= Shrapnel (American punk band) =

American punk rock band

- Origin: Red Bank, New Jersey, U.S.
- Genres: Punk rock, power pop
- Years active: 1978–1985
- Labels: Elektra, Salute
- Past members: Dave Wyndorf; Phil Caivano; Dave Vogt; Danny Clayton; Daniel Rey
- Website: Shrapnel on Facebook

Shrapnel was an American punk and power pop band formed in Red Bank, New Jersey in the late-1970s, when its members were still teenagers.

== History ==
Originating as Hard Attack (named after the second Dust album), the band evolved and changed their name to Shrapnel, which became a militaristic, jingoistic concept band in its first few years of existence. Guitarist Daniel Rey cites the Alice Cooper stage show as an inspiration to develop a "schtick". The concept drew from singer Dave Wyndorf's strong interest in history, a desire to counter the hippie feeling still present in 70s rock, and memories of childhood games of play acting as soldiers (a practice that the band and manager Legs McNeil continued during the band's formative days). The band and McNeil also conceived of war as a relevant metaphor for both life on the NYC streets, and also for opposition to elements of late 70s culture that they felt alienated from.

The band's stage show and lyrics were entertaining and helped them develop a local following, but were also controversial, not least for a masked character named "the gook". The band (and McNeil) had artistic intentions for these elements, such as satirically redefining slang terms that were used by soldiers during World War II, the Korean conflict, and the Vietnam War. Rey describes the net effect as being a display of "comic book politics", and McNeil provides the perspective that they were all "white liberals", albeit ones that had (to use contemporary parlance) a very un-PC sense of humor. Wyndorf has compared the band's antics in the earlier part of their history to Vaudeville, and has stated that it was amusing to provoke the easily offended.

At the outset, Shrapnel wore military uniforms onstage. The band's aesthetic included glorification of war, carrying prop M16 rifles onstage, and stances criticizing earlier anti-Vietnam War sentiment: "Hey, you asshole creep, I bet you were against the war." This satirical but straight faced outlook was criticized, including being labeled as "proto-fascist" by the Village Voice, due to the provocative stage antics, and song titles such as Hey Little Gook. Although the band gained popularity in the NYC punk scene, they may have "suffered a virtual press blackout because they flirt(ed) with attitudes (which)... the rock press apparently deem(ed) unacceptable even as satire."

The band played CBGB often, and drew comparison to the Ramones. On April 9, 1979, Shrapnel opened for the Ramones in the latter band's last ever concert at CBGB. The concert was a benefit to buy bulletproof vests for NYPD. The concert was attended by Norman Mailer, who was a friend of McNeil. Shrapnel would soon play at parties at Mailer's Brooklyn home, including one that was attended by Kurt Vonnegut, Woody Allen, Glen Buxton and José Torres. The event was covered by Rolling Stone, with that magazine's Kurt Loder writing "It figures that author Norman Mailer would go for Shrapnel, a New York punk band whose act is derived from endless reruns of the old Combat! series." Vonnegut apparently was particularly impressed; Loder reported that while many guests danced, the author "stood transfixed by the spectacle", and later complemented Rey on the song I lost my baby on the Siegfried Line, saying that it was a "damn good song, lots of feeling."

In 1980, Amazing Spider-Man Annual #14 (by Frank Miller and Dennis O'Neil) featured a plot in which Peter Parker goes to see Shrapnel play at CBGB. A super-villain mind-controls the crowd and band, forcing Spider-Man and Doctor Strange to save the day. The comic also contained an ad for Shrapnel's Combat Love b/w Hey 45.

By 1983, Shrapnel had softened their image. Michael Alago, who would go on to broker the band's Elektra Records deal (and who would later help major acts including Metallica and White Zombie sign record deals), had replaced Legs McNeil as manager. Gone were the combat fatigues, sandbags, and masked characters, although the band would still use a "bomb" as a prop during their performance of the song Chrome Magnum Man, to Alagro's chagrin. Wyndorf, always an avid comic book enthusiast, explained that although the song uses war themes (bombs), it is actually a superhero song. He also stated that the band's use of a patriotic star in their imagery was a tribute to Captain America. During this period, the band retired some older material that, while amusing at the time, was written "while drunk" and started to "feel hypocritical". Wyndorf now wrote songs, such as Hope For Us All, that had explicitly positive messages. This song would appear on the EP that would serve as both their major label debut, and their swan song.

Two Shrapnel songs, "Sleepover" and "Come Back to Me", are used in the 1983 cult film The First Turn-On! by Troma Films.

Shrapnel released two 7 inch indie singles in 1979 and 1981 respectively, and also had a major label (Elektra Records) 5 song self-titled 12" EP released in 1984, before disbanding in 1985. The members were Dave Wyndorf (vocals), Daniel Rabinowitz, aka Daniel Rey (guitar), Dave Vogt (guitar), Phil Caivano (bass), and Danny Clayton (drums). Wyndorf would go on to co-found eventual gold selling rock band Monster Magnet in 1989 and continues to lead that band 35+ years later. Caivano has also been a long-time member of Monster Magnet and has played in other bands including Blitzspeer and Murphy's Law. Rey has produced over 40 albums since 1987, including for artists such as Ramones, Misfits, White Zombie, Murphy's Law, Richard Hell, and Ronnie Spector, and served as Joey Ramone's guitarist during his solo career.

== Discography ==
=== Singles ===
Year	Title	Label	Format	B-side	Other info
1979	"Combat Love"	Salute Records	7" single	"Hey"	The band were filmed miming to the A-side on The Uncle Floyd Show. The clip is on YouTube. Features background vocals by Joey Ramone.
1981	"Go Cruisin'"	Salute Records	7" single	"Way Out World"	Produced by Ed Stasium.

=== EP ===
Year	Title	Label	Format	Other information
1984	Shrapnel	Elektra Records	Cassette/12" EP	This major label release was brokered by then-manager Michael Alago, who went on to get bands like Metallica and White Zombie record deals. Cover data also shows management by Peter Morticelli, Pelican Productions, Rochester, New York.
