= Monolithic Baby! =

Studio album by Monster Magnet
- Released: May 25, 2004
- Recorded: September/October 2003
- Length: 54:23
- Label: SPV
- Producer: Dave Wyndorf, Scott Humphrey

Monster Magnet chronology
Greatest Hits (2003)	Monolithic Baby! (2004)	4-Way Diablo (2007)

Singles from Monolithic Baby!
- 1. "Unbroken (Hotel Baby)" Released: 2004; 2. "Monolithic" Released: 2004

Professional ratings
Review scores
Source	Rating
AllMusic	4/5 stars
KNAC	4/5 stars
The Guardian	2/5 stars

Monolithic Baby! is the sixth studio album by American rock band Monster Magnet, released in 2004. It is a follow-up to 2000's God Says No. It would also be the first album featuring bassist Jim Baglino. Bob Pantella was hired to fill the band's drum position after the album's recording; the drums on the album were performed by Michael Wildwood.

The album features three cover songs – "There's No Way Out of Here" written by Ken Baker and originally recorded by Baker's English country rock band Unicorn, "The Right Stuff" by Robert Calvert and Velvet Underground's "Venus in Furs", the latter being available on the US edition of the album only.

The song "Master of Light" was written for the movie Torque (2004) where the band appears performing it in the nightclub, but the version heard in the movie is a remix with a greater presence of electronic touches.

Monolithic Baby! charted in seven countries and peaked at #7 in Sweden and #13 in Germany.

== Track listing ==
All tracks are written by Dave Wyndorf, except where noted.

No.	Title	Length
1.	"Slut Machine"	3:28
2.	"Supercruel"	3:40
3.	"On the Verge"	5:54
4.	"Unbroken (Hotel Baby)"	3:42
5.	"Radiation Day"	4:56
6.	"Monolithic"	4:39
7.	"The Right Stuff" (Robert Calvert cover)	4:32
8.	"There's No Way Out of Here" (Unicorn cover)	4:10
9.	"Master of Light"	4:45
10.	"Too Bad"	3:33
11.	"Ultimate Everything"	7:26
12.	"CNN War Theme"	3:35
Total length:		54:23

US bonus tracks
No.	Title	Length
13.	"King of Mars 2004"	4:27
14.	"Venus in Furs" (The Velvet Underground cover)	4:51

=== Special edition ===
Some special edition copies contain the US bonus tracks and a bonus DVD with an interview with the band, live performances, and the uncensored music videos for "Unbroken (Hotel Baby)" and "The Right Stuff".

== Personnel ==
- Dave Wyndorf – vocals, guitar
- Ed Mundell – lead guitar
- Phil Caivano – guitar
- Jim Baglino – bass
- Michael Wildwood – drums

== Chart positions ==
=== Weekly charts ===
Chart (2004)	Peak position
Austrian Albums Chart	46
Belgian Albums Chart (VL)	37
German Albums Charts	13
French Albums Chart	140
Finnish Albums Chart	19
Norwegian Albums Chart	26
Swedish Albums Chart	7

Year	Single	Mainstream Rock Tracks
2004	"Unbroken (Hotel Baby)"	#31
