= Tab (album) =

EP by Monster Magnet
- Released: 1991
- Genre: Psychedelic rock; space rock
- Length: 48:51
- Label: Glitterhouse Records
- Producer: Monster Magnet

Monster Magnet chronology
Monster Magnet (1990)	Tab (1991)	Spine of God (1991)

Professional ratings
Review scores
Source	Rating
AllMusic	4/5 stars
Collector's Guide to Heavy Metal	5/10

Tab (alternately referred to as MONSTER MAGNET 25............TAB, Tab 25, or 25 Tab) is the second EP by American rock band Monster Magnet, released in 1991. Initially released only in Europe, it was recorded before the band's 1991 debut full-length album Spine of God and was not released in North America until after the group's 1993 album Superjudge became a minor hit. The EP is generally viewed as Monster Magnet's most psychedelic release, with the first two tracks alone totaling almost 45 minutes.

== Track listing ==
No.	Title	Writer(s)	Length
1.	"Tab..."	Dave Wyndorf, John McBain, Tim Cronin	32:14
2.	"25 / Longhair"	Wyndorf, McBain	12:28
3.	"Lord 13"	Wyndorf	4:09
Total length:			48:51

2006 reissue
No.	Title	Writer(s)	Length
1.	"Tab..."	Dave Wyndorf, John McBain, Tim Cronin	32:14
2.	"25 / Longhair"	Wyndorf, McBain	12:28
3.	"Lord 13"	Wyndorf	4:09
4.	"Spine of God" (Live)	Wyndorf	7:25
Total length:			56:16

Note: some Caroline Records versions include the songs "Murder" and "Tractor", taken from the band's self-titled debut EP, as hidden bonus tracks.

== In popular culture ==
The 1999 film Beowulf features the track "Lord 13" on its soundtrack. It is played during the ending credits of the film.

== Personnel ==
- Dave Wyndorf – guitar, vocals
- John McBain – guitar
- Joe Calandra – bass
- Jon Kleiman – drums
- Tim Cronin – bass, additional vocals, additional drums
