= A Better Dystopia =

Studio album by Monster Magnet
- Released: May 22, 2021
- Recorded: Freak Shop, Port Monmouth, New Jersey
- Genre: Stoner rock; hard rock
- Length: 47:32
- Label: Napalm
- Producer: Dave Wyndorf; Philip Caivano; Bob Pantella

Monster Magnet chronology
Mindfucker (2018)	A Better Dystopia (2021)

Singles from A Better Dystopia
- 1. "Mr. Destroyer" Released: March 23, 2021; 2. "Motorcycle (Straight to Hell)" Released: May 19, 2021

A Better Dystopia is the eleventh studio album by American rock band Monster Magnet, released on May 22, 2021 by Napalm Records. It is a cover album, mostly made up of songs from psychedelic rock and garage rock bands of the 1960s and 1970s.

== Track listing ==
A Better Dystopia track listing
No.	Title	Length
1.	"The Diamond Mine" (Dave Diamond cover)	1:58
2.	"Born to Go" (Hawkwind cover)	5:47
3.	"Epitaph for a Head" (J.D. Blackfoot cover)	2:08
4.	"Solid Gold Hell" (The Scientists cover)	3:27
5.	"Be Forewarned" (Pentagram cover)	3:26
6.	"Mr. Destroyer" (Poobah cover)	5:41
7.	"When the Wolf Sits" (Jerusalem cover)	4:58
8.	"Death" (The Pretty Things cover)	2:58
9.	"Situation" (Josefus cover)	2:16
10.	"It's Trash" (The Cave Men cover)	2:10
11.	"Motorcycle (Straight to Hell)" (Table Scraps cover)	3:24
12.	"Learning to Die" (Dust cover)	6:28

Bonus track
No.	Title	Length
13.	"Welcome to the Void" (Morgen cover)	2:49

== Personnel ==
- Dave Wyndorf – vocals, guitar, keyboards
- Philip Caivano – guitar, bass, background vocals, engineer
- Bob Pantella – drums, percussion, engineer
- Garrett Sweeny – guitar
- Alec Morton – bass
- Carrie Wyndorf – background vocals on "Epitaph for a Head"
- Betty Wyndorf – background vocals on "Welcome to the Void"

Technical

- Produced by Dave Wyndorf, Philip Caivano and Bob Pantella
- Covert art by Joe Tait

== Charts ==
Chart performance for A Better Dystopia
Chart (2021)	Peak position
Austrian Albums (Ö3 Austria)	22
Belgian Albums (Ultratop Flanders)	87
German Albums (Offizielle Top 100)	10
Swiss Albums (Schweizer Hitparade)	25
US Top Album Sales (Billboard)	53
