= Milking the Stars: A Re-Imagining of Last Patrol =

Remix album by Monster Magnet
- Released: November 14, 2014
- Genre: Psychedelic rock
- Length: 74:43
- Label: Napalm Records
- Producer: Dave Wyndorf, Phil Caivano

Monster Magnet chronology
Last Patrol (2013)	Milking the Stars: A Re-Imagining of Last Patrol (2014)	Cobras and Fire (The Mastermind Redux) (2015)

Professional ratings
Review scores
Source	Rating
AllMusic	3.5/5 stars
The Rockpit	4/5 stars
Sputnikmusic	3.5/5 stars
Ultimate Guitar	7.4/10

Milking the Stars: A Re-Imagining of Last Patrol is a remix studio album by the American rock band Monster Magnet, released on November 14, 2014. According to frontman Dave Wyndorf, the album is a "reimagined" version of their previous album, 2013's Last Patrol, featuring four new songs and two live tracks. The album is not strictly a remix of Last Patrol, as songs feature new recordings and arrangements aimed at giving the album what Wyndorf describes as "a weird 1960s vibe". The album concludes with two live tracks recorded at the AB in Brussels in 2014, and which feature the debut performance of the band's new bassist, Chris Kosnik.

== Track listing ==
No.	Title	Length
1.	"Let the Circus Burn"	7:25
2.	"Mindless Ones '68"	5:22
3.	"No Paradise for Me"	5:34
4.	"End of Time (B-3)"	6:36
5.	"Milking the Stars"	7:19
6.	"Hallelujah (Fuzz and Swamp)"	5:01
7.	"I Live Behind the Clouds (Roughed Up and Slightly Spaced)"	4:35
8.	"Goliath Returns"	3:30
9.	"Stay Tuned (Even Sadder)"	6:01
10.	"The Duke (Full On Drums 'n Wah)"	5:25
11.	"Last Patrol" (Live at the AB, 2014)	11:14
12.	"Three Kingfishers" (Live at the AB, 2014)	6:41
Total length:		74:43

== Personnel ==
- Dave Wyndorf – guitar, keyboards, vocals
- Philip Caivano – bass, guitar
- Bob Pantella – percussion, drums
- Garrett Sweeny – guitar, sitar
- Chris Kosnik – bass on "Last Patrol", "Three Kingfishers"
