= Perseverance (Hatebreed album) =

Studio album by Hatebreed
- Released: March 26, 2002
- Genre: Metalcore; hardcore punk
- Length: 38:33
- Label: Universal
- Producer: Matt Hyde

Hatebreed chronology
Satisfaction Is the Death of Desire (1997)	Perseverance (2002)	The Rise of Brutality (2003)

Singles from Perseverance
- 1. "I Will Be Heard" Released: 2001; 2. "Perseverance" Released: 2002

Perseverance is the second studio album by American metalcore band Hatebreed. It was released in 2002 by Universal Records. It is the band's last album to feature Lou Richards on guitar before his departure in 2002 and suicide in 2006.

== Recording ==
Hatebreed initially began recording for their follow up to their 1997 debut album Satisfaction Is the Death of Desire in November of 2000, with a scheduled release of sometime in 2001. However in June of 2001 drummer Rig Ross departed from the band. Hatebreed then got Matt Byrne to step in during the rest of the recording process, and by August of 2001 they officially began pre production. Prior to the album Hatebreed recorded a demo in New York that contained the song “I Will Be Heard” which was demoed in New York. Lead singer Jamey Jasta who was looking to get the band off of the indie labels they sent the demo to several major labels and began interviewing 10+ major record producers. The demo became well liked by multiple major labels and Hatebreed eventually signed with Universal Records. The group then began recording at Farms Studios North Brookfield, Massachusetts with producer Matt Hyde and in October of that year they dropped of a tour with Slayer to finish the album. In December of 2001 they then went to A&M Studios in Los Angeles to mix the record with Randy Staub.

== Background and release ==
Many tracks are short, explosive bursts rather than long compositions a common trait in hardcore/metalcore of that period. Lyrically, Perseverance emphasizes resilience, fighting against adversity, not giving up, themes of strength in the face of opposition. The track “I Will Be Heard” is especially iconic for its call-to-action / motivational tone. Jasta stated in an interview “I knew it was definitely different from what we had done on the first album, and I knew that we'd have to grow as a band and get away from some of that stuff that we did on the first album so that people would take us a little more seriously.”

As for the lyrics AllMusic wrote "Jasta seems to have a bone to pick with an assortment of unnamed characters, as almost every song on Perseverance is made up of lyrics that communicate the fact that Hatebreed will remain despite any ill words or empty threats."

The album debuted at number 50 on the Billboard 200, and as of 2022 it has sold over 250,000 units.

The lead single from Perseverance, "I Will Be Heard", was accompanied by a music video which was directed by The Amazing Spider-Man director Marc Webb. The video, which featured intense live performance footage and aggressive imagery, ended up getting banned from MTV which was a huge blow to the band. However the song eventually got significant play time on MTV2's Headbangers Ball, when vocalist Jamey Jasta became the host in 2003. The title track also got a music video which was directed by Dale Resteghini.

"I Will Be Heard" is featured in the film XXX and on its soundtrack. "Below the Bottom" appeared in The Texas Chainsaw Massacre soundtrack. More recently it appeared in The Punisher: One Last Kill.

== Critical reception and legacy ==
Professional ratings
Review scores
Source	Rating
AllMusic	4.5/5 stars
Collector's Guide to Heavy Metal	10/10
Lollipop Magazine	Positive
Ultimate Guitar	10/10
Lambgoat	7/10
sputnikmusic	3/5
Ox-Fanzine	10/10
Metal.de	8/10

Perseverance is a celebrated album in the hardcore genre and received positive reviews upon release. Jason Taylor of AllMusic wrote “Perseverance is an excellent introduction for those who have not yet experienced Hatebreed and matches the group's debut -- possibly even bettering past efforts.” A reiview from Ultimate Guitar simply stated “ This album is a great hardcore album” adding “Jamey Jasta should be the most celebrated hardcore lyricist.” Sputnikmusic praised the albums energy, but also mentioned that it might get repetitive to a regular listener. Geoff Harman of Lambgoat claimed “This release marks a milestone for the hardcore community and surpasses every possible expectation you could have for a band that is returning after such a long time without new material.” A reviewer from Ultimate Guitar fame the album a perfect score stating "This album has the most heavy riffs I've heard from a hardcore band in a while. Great sing a long anthems like "Hollow Ground" and "You're Never Alone". One of the few hardcore bands to put solos in their songs. Great tempo keeping drummer and bassist. Learn how many ways a band can play off the "E" chord and still make it sound original."

Ox-Fanzine dubbed it "The undisputed hardcore album of the year" adding "one that all the imitators are bound to fail miserably at copying."

The album was named #64 on Decibels list of The Top 100 Greatest Metal Albums of the 2000s. In 2014 the album was inducted into Rock Sound Hall of Fame for its impact on both the metalcore and hardcore genres.

In 2020 Metal Hammer named it to their list of the top 20 best metalcore albums of all time. They stated "Perseverance leans in more on the metal side of things far more than ever before – particularly their love of Slayer riffs – it was a huge breakthrough for Jamey Jasta and co. It’s hard to imagine a Hatebreed set without the likes of I Will Be Heard, Proven or the title track, and it’s this album that kicked the hardest at the doors of the mainstream just before metalcore’s early 00’s commercial boom happened."

In addition both Metal Hammer and Loudwire have ranked it as the bands best album. With Loudwire writing that "Hatebreed would capture the attention of punk and more mainstream metal audiences thanks to their 2002 release ‘Perseverance, adding "For many fans of metal, it opened their door to hardcore, along with its ethos. Its tough-love attitude welcomes and challenges anyone who is willing to listen, remaining one of the genre’s best to date."

Loudwire dubbed the single "I Will Be Heard" as one of the 66 best metal songs of the 21st century stating " Pontiff of PMA (positive mental attitude) Jamey Jasta served as a megaphone for the downtrodden, urging them to cut through the bullshit and to make their presence known on "I Will Be Heard."

== Anniversary tours ==
Hatebreed held the first anniversary tour for the album in 2012 in celebration of its 10th anniversary. The tour took place in the US spanning from September 13, to October 12, with Whitechapel, All Shall Parish and Deez Nuts serving as the supporting acts. The second tour took place in 2017 during the albums 15th anniversary which served as a double celebration along with 20th anniversary of their debut album Satisfaction Is the Death of Desire. The first leg of the tour went from October 26, 2017, to December 9, additional dates were later added in March of 2018, with Crowbar, Twitching Tongues and The Acacia Strain. The most recent tour took place in 2022, for the 20th anniversary, which went from October 27, to November 20, all dates taking place in the US.

== Track listing ==
All tracks are written by Hatebreed.

No.	Title	Length
1.	"Proven"	2:35
2.	"Perseverance"	2:20
3.	"You're Never Alone"	3:21
4.	"I Will Be Heard"	2:58
5.	"A Call for Blood"	3:05
6.	"Below the Bottom"	2:25
7.	"We Still Fight"	1:35
8.	"Unloved"	2:37
9.	"Bloodsoaked Memories"	2:52
10.	"Hollow Ground"	2:39
11.	"Final Prayer"	2:12
12.	"Smash Your Enemies"	2:09
13.	"Healing to Suffer Again"	2:49
14.	"Judgement Strikes (Unbreakable)"	1:25
15.	"Remain Nameless"	2:50
16.	"Outro"	0:38
Total length:		38:33

== Credits ==
Writing, performance and production credits are adapted from the album liner notes.

=== Personnel ===
==== Hatebreed ====
- Jamey Jasta – vocals
- Lou "Boulder" Richards – rhythm guitar
- Sean Martin – lead guitar
- Chris "The Xmas Bitch" Beattie – bass
- Matt Byrne – drums

==== Guest musicians ====
- Kerry King – guitar on "Final Prayer"

==== Additional musicians ====
- Joseph Ianucci – gang vocals
- Jason Gelabert – gang vocals
- Joseph Harrington – gang vocals
- Christopher Harris – gang vocals
- Paul Romanko (Shadows Fall) – gang vocals
- Kyle Tanguay – gang vocals
- Brian Murphy – gang vocals
- Jim Connolly – gang vocals
- Jonathan Donais (Shadows Fall) – gang vocals
- Chris Bailey – gang vocals
- Ivan Murillo – gang vocals

==== Production ====
- Steve Richards – executive production
- Matt Hyde – production, recording
- Jay Gelabert – production assistant
- Josh Grden – production coordination
- Zeuss – recording
- Paul Forgues – recording assistant, digital editing
- Phil Caivano – recording assistant, guitar tech
- Rob Gil – engineering assistant
- Randy Staub – mixing
- German Villacorta – engineering assistant
- Dave Collins – mastering

==== Artwork and design ====
- Dean Karr – art direction, photography
- Steven R. Gilmore – design, photo editing

=== Studios ===
- Long View Farm Studios, North Brookfield, MA – recording
- Henson Recording Studios, Los Angeles, CA – mixing
- Marcussen Mastering, Los Angeles, CA – mastering

== Charts ==
Weekly chart performance for Perseverance by Hatebreed
Chart (2002)	Peak position
UK Albums (Official Charts)	195
UK Rock & Metal Albums (Official Charts)	22
US Billboard 200	50

=== Year-end charts ===
Year-end chart performance for Perseverance by Hatebreed
Chart (2002)	Position
Canadian Alternative Albums (Nielsen SoundScan)	149
Canadian Metal Albums (Nielsen SoundScan)	74
