= The Rise of Brutality =

Studio album by Hatebreed
- Released: October 28, 2003
- Genres: Metalcore; hardcore punk
- Length: 31:58
- Label: Universal
- Producer: Zeuss

Hatebreed chronology
Perseverance (2002)	The Rise of Brutality (2003)	Supremacy (2006)

Singles from The Rise of Brutality
- 1. "This Is Now"; 2. "Live for This"

The Rise of Brutality is the third studio album by American metalcore band Hatebreed. It was released on October 28, 2003 by Universal Records.

== Background ==
"This is Now" proved to be the album's first single, frequently being played on MTV2's Headbangers Ball, a program which vocalist Jamey Jasta often hosted. The song was also included on the first MTV2 Headbangers Ball compilation album that same year. A second single would be found in "Live for This," with its music video dedicated to a deceased friend of the band. The song "Another Day, Another Vendetta," greatly samples the song "Just Look Around," by Sick of it All, borrowing the first verse.

The album sold 32,515 copies in its first week and debuted at number 30 on the Billboard 200. It has since sold over 150,000 units.

The first song, "Tear It Down", is an extended version of the song "Outro" from the previous album Perseverance. Their song "Live for This" was nominated for a Grammy award in 2005. The bonus track "Bound to Violence" appeared on The Punisher soundtrack.

In 2023 the band embarked on a North American tour in celebration of the albums 20th anniversary.

== Composition ==
The group started working on The Rise of Brutality in early 2003 , with the band seeking to make their sound into something heavier and more aggressive while growing in popularity following their previous album Perseverance. Lead singer Jamey Jasta compared the recording process to gathering in a basement and jamming, very similar to the way they recorded their debut demo. Jasta added “We wanted to make this one a little more brutal than Perseverance but at the same time catchier. It’s a good balance.” Zeuss served as both producer and recording engineer, overseeing the recording sessions which were done at Planet Z Studios.

== Critical reception ==
Professional ratings
Review scores
Source	Rating
AllMusic	4.5/5 stars
Collector's Guide to Heavy Metal	9/10
Exclaim!	favorable
MusicOMH	favorable
PopMatters	mixed
Punknews.org	2.5/5 stars
Sputnikmusic	3.0/5
Ultimate Guitar	10/10
Metal.de	9/10

The album was met with positive reviews, Johnny Loftus of AllMusic gave the album a 4.5/5 stating “ Hatebreed have turned in 32 minutes of hard, visceral music that knocks the chip off your shoulder so that it might scream louder in your ear. Songs seem specially designed to incite the crowd.” Jasamine White-Gluz of Exclaim! wrote “Hatebreed sticks to what they do best: growling vocals, thrashing guitars and writing every song as if it were an anthem. The bands passion is unmistakable in each concise blast of positive hardcore. Adding “Lead vocalist Jamey Jastas lyrics sound more heartfelt, as if he doesn’t feel he needs to prove himself anymore.” A reviewer from Ultimate Guitar wrote “This album has it all it has songs with more melodic sounds, like "Live for This," and it has the songs that are just pure destruction, like "Doomsayer" or "Voice Of Contention." The overall sound of the album is great.”

Darmond of Sputnikmusic wrote 'Rise of Brutality' is a good and a bad record at the same time. The little change in sound makes it great for people who just look for hard pounding music. But the variation stays behind because of this.” Metal.de added "The Rise of Brutality" can really only be described as *the* hard-/metalcore album of this year—and the last few. Or, to put it in a single word: Brutaaaaal."

In December 2004, the song "Live for This" was nominated for a Grammy Award for Best Metal Performance at the 47th Grammy Awards The award was ultimately given to Motörhead for their cover of the Metallica song "Whiplash".

== Track listing ==
All tracks are written by Hatebreed.

No.	Title	Length
1.	"Tear It Down"	1:47
2.	"Straight to Your Face"	2:17
3.	"Facing What Consumes You"	3:29
4.	"Live for This"	2:50
5.	"Doomsayer"	3:23
6.	"Another Day, Another Vendetta"	3:05
7.	"A Lesson Lived Is a Lesson Learned"	2:03
8.	"Beholder of Justice"	2:44
9.	"This Is Now"	3:36
10.	"Voice of Contention"	2:27
11.	"Choose or Be Chosen"	1:39
12.	"Confide in No One"	2:38
Total length:		31:58

UK bonus track
No.	Title	Length
13.	"Bound to Violence"	2:23
Total length:		34:21

== Credits ==
Writing, performance and production credits are adapted from the album liner notes.

=== Personnel ===
==== Hatebreed ====
- Jamey Jasta – vocals
- Sean Martin – guitar
- Chris "The Xmas Bitch" Beattie – bass
- Matt Byrne – drums

==== Production ====
- Steve Richards – executive production
- Zeuss – production, engineering
- Rob Gil – recording assistant, digital editing
- Phil Caivano – recording assistant, guitar tech
- Michael "Sully da Bull" Sullivan – production coordination
- Mike Fraser – mixing
- Misha Rajaratnam – mixing assistant
- George Marino – mastering

==== Artwork and design ====
- Jamey Jasta – packaging concept
- Devastation Media – layout, design
- Jay Gelabert – packaging coordination

=== Studios ===
- Planet-Z, Hadley, MA, U.S.– recording
- Armoury Studios, Vancouver, BC, Canada – mixing
- Sterling Sound, New York City, NY, U.S. – mastering

== Charts ==
Chart	Peak position
US Billboard 200	30
UK Rock & Metal Albums Chart	22
