= The Lucky Ones (Pride Tiger album) =

Studio album by Pride Tiger
- Released: June 18, 2007
- Studio: Hideaway & Sunset Lodge Recording in Los Angeles, California
- Genre: Rock
- Length: 43:46
- Label: EMI Music Canada
- Producer: Matt Hyde

The Lucky Ones is the only full-length album from the Canadian rock band Pride Tiger. The music is 1970s-style rock with strong melodies and dual guitar harmonies.

It was nominated for a 2008 Juno Award in the Rock Album of the Year category.

== Track listing ==
1. "Let 'Em Go"
2. "What It Is"
3. "Fill Me In"
4. "A Long Way Down"
5. "White Witch Woman Blues"
6. "The Lucky Ones"
7. "It's Only You"
8. "No-One's Listening"
9. "Sweet Dreams"
10. "Forget Everything"
11. "A New Jones"
12. "56 Days"
