= Superjudge =

Studio album by Monster Magnet
- Released: April 6, 1993
- Recorded: October 1992
- Genre: Stoner metal; space rock
- Length: 53:43
- Label: A&M
- Producer: Dave Wyndorf

Monster Magnet chronology
Spine of God (1991)	Superjudge (1993)	Dopes to Infinity (1995)

Singles from Superjudge
- 1. "Twin Earth" Released: 1993; 2. "Cyclops Revolution" Released: 1993; 3. "Face Down" Released: 1993; 4. "Cage Around the Sun" Released: 1993

Professional ratings
Review scores
Source	Rating
AllMusic	3/5 stars
Collector's Guide to Heavy Metal	7/10
Entertainment Weekly	B+
Riff Raff	B

Superjudge is the second album by American rock band Monster Magnet, released on April 6, 1993. It is the first Monster Magnet album to feature lead guitarist Ed Mundell, who replaced founding member John McBain in 1992. The tracks "Twin Earth" and "Face Down" were released as singles with accompanying music videos.

== Overview ==
Superjudge was Monster Magnet's second album, after Spine of God (in addition to the mini-album Monster Magnet and the EP Tab). Notably, Superjudge was the band's debut on a major label via A&M Records. It was recorded and mixed by Steve Rosenthal at New York's "The Magic Shop" studio in October, 1992, with all original material composed by the band's lead vocalist Dave Wyndorf.

The album fared poorly commercially, largely due to its release coinciding with the advent of the grunge era, which ultimately resulted in a dramatic decline in the popularity of heavy metal in general. Though a commercial disappointment after its release, Superjudge has since become an influential album in the stoner rock genre.

The album includes covers of Willie Dixon's "Evil" (utilizing an arrangement used by the band Cactus on their 1971 cover of the song), and Hawkwind's "Brainstorm" from their 1972 album, Doremi Fasol Latido.

== Music and lyrics ==
Superjudge is overall heavier than the band's debut album Spine of God, and makes use of fewer vocal effects. The album incorporates elements of hard rock, psychedelia, heavy metal, blues rock and punk rock.

According to Wyndorf, Superjudge began as something of a concept album, but the only surviving part is the band's cover of Willie Dixon's "Evil (Is Going On)". Also according to Wyndorf, "For a while, we were thinking of doing a total blues record, old Ten Years After stuff and old Howlin' Wolf stuff," Wyndorf says. "But we couldn't pull it off. It didn't sit right with us, so we kept 'Evil' and a couple others, but only 'Evil' made it to the tape."

The album's lyrics make references to various sci-fi topics, with Wyndorf saying he writes "ambiguous and coded" lyrics because if he didn't, "I'd get bored singing them after three gigs." "The songs I like aren't explained," he says. "You can try to figure them out. I write stream-of-consciousness and I don't rewrite much. A lot of times, I'll have one foot in reality-something going on in Belgium or whatever-and the other in what I wish could happen-planets, spaceships-and try to fit them together and make sense out of it."

== Track listing ==
All tracks are written by Dave Wyndorf, except where noted.

No.	Title	Length
1.	"Cyclops Revolution"	5:43
2.	"Twin Earth"	3:55
3.	"Superjudge"	6:49
4.	"Cage Around the Sun"	4:55
5.	"Elephant Bell"	3:59
6.	"Dinosaur Vacume"	6:02
7.	"Evil" (Willie Dixon; originally performed by Howlin' Wolf)	3:14
8.	"Stadium"	3:41
9.	"Face Down"	4:11
10.	"Brainstorm" (Nik Turner; originally performed by Hawkwind)	8:04
11.	"Black Balloon"	3:05
Total length:		53:43

Import version bonus tracks
No.	Title	Length
12.	"Nod Scene" (Live)	6:26
13.	"Snake Dance" (Live)	3:33
14.	"Medicine" (Live)	4:24

== Personnel ==
Monster Magnet

- Dave Wyndorf – guitar, vocals, producer
- Ed Mundell – lead guitar
- Joe Calandra – bass
- Jon Kleiman – drums

Additional musicians

- Tim Cronin – "Mountain of Judgement" according to album's liner notes

Technical staff and artwork

- Steve Rosenthal – mixing
- Edward Douglas – assistant engineer
- Joe Warda – assistant engineer
- Bogdan Hernik – assistant engineer
- Bernie Grundman – mastering
- Rich Frankel – art direction
- Rob Leecock – cover "Bull God" painting
- Michael Lavine – photography
