= Monster Magnet (EP) =

EP by Monster Magnet
- Released: February 1, 1990
- Recorded: 1989
- Length: 27:41
- Label: Glitterhouse
- Producer: Monster Magnet

Monster Magnet chronology
Monster Magnet (1990)	Tab (1991)

Singles from Monster Magnet
- 1. "Lizard Johnny" Released: 1990; 2. "Murder" Released: 1990

Professional ratings
Review scores
Source	Rating
AllMusic	2/5 stars

Monster Magnet is the debut EP by American rock band Monster Magnet, released through the German label Glitterhouse Records in 1990. The songs "Snake Dance" and "Nod Scene" would later be re-recorded for the group's debut full-length album Spine of God, released in 1991. The song "Tractor" would later be re-recorded for the group's Powertrip album, released in 1998.

== Track listing ==
No.	Title	Writer(s)	Length
1.	"Snake Dance"	Dave Wyndorf	3:21
2.	"Tractor"	Wyndorf	3:25
3.	"Nod Scene"	John McBain, Wyndorf	7:15
4.	"Freak Shop USA"	McBain, Wyndorf	4:37
5.	"Lizard Johnny"	McBain, Wyndorf	5:25
6.	"Murder"	Wyndorf	3:37
Total length:			27:41

== Personnel ==
- Dave Wyndorf – guitar, vocals
- John McBain – guitar
- Tom Diello – drums
- Tim Cronin – bass, additional vocals
