= S.F.W. =

- Theatrical release poster
- Directed by: Jefery Levy
- Screenplay by: Danny Rubin; Jefery Levy
- Based on: S.F.W. by Andrew Wellman
- Produced by: Dale Pollock
- Starring: Stephen Dorff; Reese Witherspoon
- Cinematography: Peter Deming
- Edited by: Lauren Zuckerman
- Music by: Graeme Revell
- Production companies: PolyGram Filmed Entertainment; A&M Films; Propaganda Films
- Distributed by: Gramercy Pictures
- Release dates: September 15, 1994 (TIFF); October 14, 1994 (United States)
- Running time: 96 minutes
- Country: United States
- Language: English
- Box office: $63,513

S.F.W. (or So Fucking What) is a 1994 American black comedy film directed by Jefery Levy and written by Levy and Danny Rubin. Based on the 1991 novel of the same name by Andrew Wellman, it stars Stephen Dorff and Reese Witherspoon.

S.F.W. premiered at the Toronto International Film Festival on September 15, 1994 and was released by Gramercy Pictures on October 14, 1994. The film received negative reviews from critics and grossed $63,513.

== Plot ==
Cliff Spab and his friend Joe Dice go out one evening to buy beer from a convenience store, where a group of armed, masked terrorists take them and three other people hostage. The terrorists, who call themselves S.P.L.I.T. Image, have a video camera with which they tape their hostages' every word and action. S.P.L.I.T. Image's only demand is that their broadcasts be televised live on worldwide television, or else the hostages will be killed. The terrorists make good on the said threat by killing two hostages. Cliff, Joe, and teenager Wendy Pfister are the only surviving captives. Cliff eventually becomes indifferent to being killed. While being filmed, he demonstrates his new-found nihilistic world-view in an improvised monologue in which he repeatedly asks, "So Fucking What?". The coverage of this makes Cliff a media icon.

After 36 days of captivity, Joe manages to kill one of the terrorists. In the ensuing shoot out, Cliff shoots his way to freedom, taking a bullet in the shoulder while Joe is killed. Despite Joe's demise, Cliff is branded a hero for saving Wendy and killing the terrorists. He is picked up from the hospital by his brother Scott. He is welcomed awkwardly by his domineering father and weak-willed mother.

Back on the street, Cliff finds his life changed forever by the convenience store incident. His line – abbreviated as S.F.W. – is on banners, newspapers, CDs, and billboard advertisements. At Burger Boy, the fast-food restaurant where he works, Cliff finds his name and image posted alongside a "Special $.36 Spaburger" (named after him), being marketed in commemoration of his 36 days in captivity.

Cliff visits Joe's older sister Monica. She resents the media idolization directed at Cliff, while Joe has gotten neither sympathy nor attention. Cliff eventually has sex with Monica. The following morning, Cliff, who is disenchanted with the reporters camped on his front lawn, moves out. He visits another friend, Morrow Streeter, who lets Cliff hide out at the elegant home of his lawyer sister Janet. She advises Cliff to exploit his notoriety for personal gain. Lacking in any sense of purpose, Cliff hitchhikes out of town. He gets a ride with a couple, who idolize him. Cliff eventually stops fleeing from the journalists following him; he hosts a videoclip show, holds press conferences and makes public appearances.

More than anything, Cliff aspires to reunite with Wendy, but her parents will not let him. Wendy eventually visits him. They evade the media and revisit the convenience store, which has been closed down and boarded up as a crime scene. Wendy tells Cliff that it might be turned into a memorial park. The two later have sex.

Days later, Cliff and Wendy make a public appearance at a high school. They receive a standing ovation from a crowd of adoring students, who chant "So Fucking What!" One student, Barbara "Babs" Wyler, does not join in the cheering. After sitting in angry silence, Babs takes a gun from her book bag and stands up. With a yell of "Everything matters!" she fires on Cliff and Wendy, seriously wounding them both. Media attention switches to Babs as she is arrested, booked, and indicted for attempted murder. Her line of "Everything matters" becomes the new public catchphrase, replacing Cliff's "S.F.W.". It represents a less-disaffected philosophy than the one Cliff supposedly believes in, but it becomes equally popular. Reporters and other media people cannot stop talking about Babs' actions. Sharing their own hospital ward, the recovering Cliff and Wendy decide to get married.

== Cast ==
- Stephen Dorff as Cliff Spab
- Reese Witherspoon as Wendy Pfister
- Jake Busey as Morrow Streeter
- Joey Lauren Adams as Monica Dice
- Pamela Gidley as Janet Streeter
- David Barry Gray as Scott Spab
- Jack Noseworthy as Joe Dice
- Richard Portnow as Gerald Parsley
- Edward Wiley as Mr. Spab
- Lela Ivey as Mrs. Spab
- Amber Benson as Barbara "Babs" Wyler
- Tobey Maguire as Al
- Francesca P. Roberts as Kim Martin
- Soon-Tek Oh as Milt Morris
- Gary Coleman as himself

== Production ==
S.F.W. was filmed in October and November 1993, in Los Angeles.

== Reception ==
S.F.W. received negative reviews from critics. In a one-star review, critic Roger Ebert said "the film is intended as a satirical attack on the cult of celebrity", but its central figure is "the most singularly stupid, obnoxious character I've seen on the screen in many a day - which would be promising, if he were not boring, as well."

On Rotten Tomatoes, the film has an approval rating of 12% based on reviews from 17 critics.

== Soundtrack ==
S.F.W.: The Original Motion Picture Soundtrack was released on CD on September 27, 1994 by A&M Records.

It contains 13 tracks, with two of them, "S.F.W." and "Spab 'N' Janet Evening/The Green Room", being written especially for this movie:

1. "Jesus Christ Pose" (Soundgarden) – 5:51
2. "Get Your Gunn" (Marilyn Manson) – 3:19
3. "Can I Stay?" (Pretty Mary Sunshine) – 3:04
4. "Teenage Whore" (Hole) – 2:58
5. "Negasonic Teenage Warhead" (Monster Magnet) – 5:00
6. "Like Suicide (Acoustic Version)" (Chris Cornell) – 6:11
7. "No Fu**'n Problem" (Suicidal Tendencies) – 3:31
8. "Surrender" (cover of Cheap Trick song) (Paw) – 3:56
9. "Creep" (Radiohead) – 3:57
10. "Two at a Time" (Cop Shoot Cop) – 4:01
11. "Say What You Want" (Babes in Toyland) – 3:35
12. "S.F.W." (Gwar) – 2:18
13. "Spab 'N' Janet Evening/The Green Room" (Graeme Revell) – 2:56

The director, when discussing the soundtrack, stated "In a way, this story parallels what happened to [Kurt] Cobain. It's a movie about a regular kid (Stephen Dorff) with an extraordinary sensitivity." Levy wanted to include Nirvana's "All Apologies" and asked Cobain to screen a rough cut of the film. While he states that "Kurt really responded to the movie", Levy missed getting permission to include the song due to Cobain's suicide. The soundtrack does include "Teenage Whore", a tune by Cobain's widow Courtney Love and her band Hole. Levy recalled "When she was responding (to Cobain's suicide note in a taped broadcast) she kept using the term 'So f -- -ing what'. It was weird."

The song "S.F.W." by Gwar was nominated for the Grammy Award for Best Metal Performance at the 38th Annual Grammy Awards in 1996.

Other songs featured in the film but not on the soundtrack:

- Stephen Dorff - "Spabs Theme"
- Rainbow - "A Light in the Black"
- Mantissa - "Mary Mary"
- Therapy? - "Speedball"

Almost all of the score was composed by Graeme Revell.
