= Powertrip =

Studio album by Monster Magnet
- Released: June 16, 1998
- Recorded: 1997
- Studios: North Vine, NRG
- Genres: Stoner rock; hard rock; heavy metal
- Length: 60:42
- Label: A&M
- Producers: Dave Wyndorf, Matt Hyde

Monster Magnet chronology
Dopes to Infinity (1995)	Powertrip (1998)	God Says No (2000)

Singles from Powertrip
- 1. "Space Lord" Released: 1998; 2. "Powertrip" Released: 1998; 3. "Temple of Your Dreams" Released: 1999; 4. "See You in Hell" Released: 1999

Professional ratings
Review scores
Source	Rating
AllMusic	4/5 stars
Chicago Sun-Times	3.5/4 stars
Christgau's Consumer Guide	(1-star Honorable Mention)
Collector's Guide to Heavy Metal	9/10
Drowned in Sound	8/10
Entertainment Weekly	A−
Metal Hammer	10/10
NME	6/10
The Rolling Stone Album Guide	3.5/5 stars

Powertrip is the fourth studio album by American rock band Monster Magnet, released on June 16, 1998. The album was the band's commercial breakthrough, achieving mainstream success due largely to the hit single "Space Lord". Other hit songs on the album include "Powertrip", "Temple of Your Dreams", and "See You in Hell". The album reached #1 on the Heatseekers Charts, #21 in the German Charts, #65 in the UK Charts, and #97 on the Billboard 200. The album was certified gold by the RIAA on January 25, 1999. Music videos were made for the songs "Space Lord", "Powertrip", and "See You in Hell".

== Recording ==
After the Dopes to Infinity tour, Dave Wyndorf flew to Las Vegas to work on the group's next album. He got a hotel room 10 miles (16 km) outside the city, where he would write one song a day for twenty-one days. Most of the songs were based on the themes of Las Vegas, such as naked women and people losing their money. The song "Tractor" is a re-recorded version of the song originally released on the band's 1990 EP Monster Magnet.

== In popular culture ==
- "Powertrip" is featured in the film Soldier, starring Kurt Russell, and was the official theme song for the WWE pay-per-view event No Way Out (2007).
- "Space Lord" is featured in the film Talladega Nights: The Ballad of Ricky Bobby, starring Will Ferrell and John C. Reilly.
- "Crop Circle" is featured in the film Urban Legend.
- "See you in Hell" is featured in the film Bride of Chucky.
- "Powertrip" was included on the soundtracks of the video games MotorStorm and Far Cry 5.

== Track listing ==
All tracks are written by Dave Wyndorf, except where noted.

No.	Title	Length
1.	"Crop Circle"	5:32
2.	"Powertrip"	3:31
3.	"Space Lord"	5:55
4.	"Temple of Your Dreams"	4:35
5.	"Bummer"	7:35
6.	"Baby Götterdämerung" (misspelling of Götterdämmerung)	3:09
7.	"19 Witches"	4:02
8.	"3rd Eye Landslide"	5:10
9.	"See You in Hell"	4:05
10.	"Tractor"	3:26
11.	"Atomic Clock"	5:06
12.	"Goliath and the Vampires"	4:13
13.	"Your Lies Become You"	4:18
Total length:		60:42

Japanese bonus tracks
No.	Title	Length
14.	"Big God"	5:58
15.	"Kick Out the Jams" (MC5 cover)	2:35
16.	"The Game"	4:54

A Limited Tour Edition was also released with a bonus disc entitled Viva Las Vegas (Live in Las Vegas). The Japanese version contains this bonus disc and three bonus tracks on the original.

=== Viva Las Vegas (Live in Las Vegas) ===
No.	Title	Length
1.	"Temple of Your Dreams"	5:34
2.	"Dinosaur Vacuum"	5:19
3.	"Baby Götterdämmerung"	4:00
4.	"Cage Around the Sun"	8:18
5.	"Bummer"	7:35
6.	"Space Lord"	9:32

== Personnel ==
- Dave Wyndorf – vocals, guitar
- Ed Mundell – guitar
- Philip Caivano – guitar
- Joe Calandra – bass
- Jon Kleiman – drums

=== Additional personnel ===
- Matt Hyde – guitar, engineer, mixing
- John Flannery – guitar
- Scott Garrett – drums
- Tim Cronin – autovisuals, misinformation, herald of galactus

=== Production ===
- Steve Mixdorf – assistant engineer
- Jesse Fishman – assistant engineer
- Cameron Webb – assistant engineer
- Paul Silveira – assistant engineer
- Randy Staub – mixing
- John Travis – mixing
- Ron Boustead – digital editing
- Don C. Tyler – digital editing
- Stephen Marcussen – mastering

== Chart positions ==
=== Album ===
Chart (1998)	Peak position
Belgian Albums Chart (VL)	31
German Albums Chart	21
Swedish Albums Chart	23
UK Albums Chart	65
US Billboard 200	97
US Top Heatseekers	1

=== Singles ===
Year	Single	Modern Rock Tracks	Mainstream Rock Tracks
1997	"Temple of Your Dreams"	–	#25
1998	"Space Lord"	#29	#3
1998	"Powertrip"	–	#20

== Certifications ==
Country	Provider	Certification
United States	RIAA	Gold
