= Love Monster (EP) =

EP by Monster Magnet
- Released: 2001
- Recorded: 1988
- Genre: Stoner rock
- Length: 37:26
- Label: Wrong Way Records
- Producer: Monster Magnet

Monster Magnet chronology
God Says No (2000)	Love Monster (2001)	Greatest Hits (2003)

Love Monster is the third EP by American rock band Monster Magnet, released in 2001. All songs on the EP were recorded by lead singer Dave Wyndorf in 1988, a year before the band was formed. Only 3,000 copies of Love Monster was made, making it Monster Magnet's rarest recording material.

== Track listing ==
All tracks are written by Dave Wyndorf, except where noted.

No.	Title	Length
1.	"Love Monster"	4:53
2.	"War Hippie"	4:00
3.	"Poster"	5:03
4.	"Atom Age Vampire"	4:58
5.	"Brighter Than the Sun"	3:50
6.	"I'm Five Years Ahead of My Time" (The Third Bardo cover)	4:02
7.	"Snoopy"	10:40
Total length:		37:26
