= Pride Tiger =

- Origin: Vancouver, British Columbia, Canada
- Genres: Hard rock
- Years active: 2005–2009
- Labels: EMI, Powerage
- Spinoff of: 3 Inches of Blood
- Members: Matt Wood; Bob Froese; Sunny Dhak; Mike Payette

Pride Tiger was a Canadian hard rock music group based in Vancouver, British Columbia. The band members were vocalist and drummer Matt Wood, guitarists Bob Froese and Sunny Dhak, and bassist Mike Payette.

== History ==
Pride Tiger formed 2005 in Vancouver. The name "Pride Tiger" came from a mix of "Ride the Tiger" (a lyric from the Dio song, "Holy Diver") and "Pride Pops" (a drink similar to apple cider). Dhak, Froese and Wood were all former members of 3 Inches of Blood; Payette was a former member of S.T.R.E.E.T.S.

The band released their debut EP in 2006. They subsequently signed with EMI Music Canada, who released their full-length debut album, The Lucky Ones, in June 2007. In 2008, the band performed at the South by South West festival.

The band's single "White Witch Woman Blues" was playlisted on CBC Radio 3 and other Canadian radio stations. It was noted, by many fans and other musicians–including Alice Cooper–that Pride Tiger bore a resemblance to the classic rock band Thin Lizzy.

As of June 2009, the band had broken up. Froese and Payette went on to open a coffee shop together.

== Discography ==
- Wood, Dhak, Froese, Payette EP (2006)
- The Lucky Ones (2007)
