= Mindfucker (album) =

Studio album by Monster Magnet
- Released: March 23, 2018
- Recorded: Shorefire (Long Branch, New Jersey); Studio 13 (Red Bank, New Jersey)
- Genre: Garage rock; psychedelic rock
- Length: 49:58
- Label: Napalm
- Producer: Dave Wyndorf; Phil Caivano

Monster Magnet chronology
Cobras and Fire (The Mastermind Redux) (2015)	Mindfucker (2018)	A Better Dystopia (2021)

Singles from Mindfucker
- 1. "Mindfucker" Released: February 18, 2018; 2. "Ejection" Released: March 8, 2018

Professional ratings
Review scores
Source	Rating
Blabbermouth.net	8.5/10
Distorted Sound	7/10
Metal Hammer	2.5/5 stars
Sputnikmusic	3.5/5

Mindfucker is the tenth studio album by the American rock band Monster Magnet, released on March 23, 2018, through Napalm Records. Frontman Dave Wyndorf described the band's recent albums as "long-form psych records that were decidedly melancholy" and chose to make a return to a more rock-oriented sound for Mindfucker. The album yielded two singles, "Mindfucker" and "Ejection", the latter being a Robert Calvert cover.

== Track listing ==
All tracks are written by Dave Wyndorf, except where noted.

No.	Title	Length
1.	"Rocket Freak"	3:30
2.	"Soul"	5:27
3.	"Mindfucker"	4:59
4.	"I'm God"	6:16
5.	"Drowning"	7:21
6.	"Ejection" (Robert Calvert cover)	3:27
7.	"Want Some"	5:49
8.	"Brainwashed"	3:22
9.	"All Day Midnight"	3:59
10.	"When the Hammer Comes Down"	5:47
Total length:		49:58

== Personnel ==
- Dave Wyndorf – vocals, guitar, keyboards
- Philip Caivano – guitar, bass, background vocals
- Bob Pantella – drums, percussion
- Garrett Sweeny – guitar
- Chris Kosnik – bass
- Tim Cronin – third eye, overkill horn
- Carrie Wyndorf – background vocals on "Ejection"

Technical

- Mixed by Joe Barresi at JHOC Studios
- Mastered by Dave Collins
- Produced by Dave Wyndorf and Philip Caivano
- Additional production by Joe Barresi and Morgan Stratton
- Covert art by Rob Leecock
- Layout by Forefathers

== Charts ==
Chart performance for Mindfucker
Chart (2018)	Peak position
Austrian Albums (Ö3 Austria)	29
Belgian Albums (Ultratop Flanders)	54
German Albums (Offizielle Top 100)	19
Swiss Albums (Schweizer Hitparade)	29
US Independent Albums (Billboard)	9
US Top Album Sales (Billboard)	58
