= Dopes to Infinity =

Studio album by Monster Magnet
- Released: March 21, 1995
- Recorded: 1994
- Studio: Magic Shop, New York City; Electric Lady, New York City
- Genre: Space rock; stoner rock; heavy metal
- Length: 62:21
- Label: A&M
- Producer: Dave Wyndorf

Monster Magnet chronology
Superjudge (1993)	Dopes to Infinity (1995)	Powertrip (1998)

Singles from Dopes to Infinity
- 1. "Negasonic Teenage Warhead" Released: 1995; 2. "Dopes to Infinity" Released: 1995; 3. "Dead Christmas" Released: 1995; 4. "Look to Your Orb for the Warning" Released: 1995

Dopes to Infinity is the third album by American rock band Monster Magnet, released on March 21, 1995. The album includes the song "Negasonic Teenage Warhead", the band's first hit single.

== Overview ==
The song "Negasonic Teenage Warhead" became the band's first hit single, after having appeared the previous year in different form in the American movie S.F.W.. Other tracks, such as the title track and "Dead Christmas" however, received little or no airplay, resulting in sales of the album being only slightly better than their previous album, Superjudge. The album did reach #51 on the UK Charts and #30 in the German Charts.

A music video was made for the song "Negasonic Teenage Warhead," directed by Gore Verbinski.

In 2011, Monster Magnet revisited the album when they embarked on "Dopes To Infinity 2011: The European Tour", performing the album live in its entirety at several European locations.

== Reception ==
Professional ratings
Review scores
Source	Rating
AllMusic	4/5 stars
Collector's Guide to Heavy Metal	8/10
Entertainment Weekly	A−
Rock Hard	10/10
The Rolling Stone Album Guide	3/5 stars

In 2005, Dopes to Infinity was ranked number 406 in Rock Hard magazine's book of The 500 Greatest Rock & Metal Albums of All Time.

== Track listing ==
All tracks are written by Dave Wyndorf, except where noted.

No.	Title	Writer(s)	Length
1.	"Dopes to Infinity"		5:43
2.	"Negasonic Teenage Warhead"		4:28
3.	"Look to Your Orb for the Warning"		6:32
4.	"All Friends and Kingdom Come"		5:38
5.	"Ego, the Living Planet"		5:07
6.	"Blow 'Em Off"		3:51
7.	"Third Alternative"		8:33
8.	"I Control, I Fly"	Wyndorf, Jon Kleiman	3:18
9.	"King of Mars"		4:33
10.	"Dead Christmas"		3:54
11.	"Theme from "Masterburner""	Wyndorf, Joe Calandra	5:06
12.	"Vertigo"		5:41
Total length:			62:21

UK/European release
No.	Title	Length
12.	"Vertigo" (contains a 3:34 edit of "Forbidden Planet" after 2 minutes of silence)	11:15
Total length:		68:04

Japan bonus tracks
No.	Title	Length
13.	"Eclipse This"	4:33
14.	"Negasonic Teenage Warhead" (live)	10:26
Total length:		77:20

=== Australian Tour edition bonus disc ===
No.	Title	Length
1.	"Intro" (live)	0:36
2.	"Snake Dance" (live)	3:33
3.	"Twin Earth" (live)	3:59
4.	"Nod Scene" (live)	3:15
5.	"Evil" (live)	3:12
Total length:		14:25

=== Vinyl double-LP ===
Side A
No.	Title	Length
1.	"Dopes to Infinity"	5:43
2.	"Negasonic Teenage Warhead"	4:28
3.	"Look to Your Orb for the Warning"	6:32
4.	"All Friends and Kingdom Come"	5:38

Side B
No.	Title	Writer(s)	Length
5.	"Ego, the Living Planet"		5:07
6.	"Blow 'Em Off"		3:51
7.	"Third Alternative"		8:33
8.	"I Control, I Fly"	Wyndorf, Jon Kleiman	3:18

Side C
No.	Title	Writer(s)	Length
9.	"King of Mars"		4:33
10.	"Dead Christmas"		3:54
11.	"Theme from "Masterburner""	Wyndorf, Joe Calandra	5:06
12.	"Vertigo"		5:41

Side D
No.	Title	Length
13.	"Forbidden Planet"	16:08
Total length:		78:29

== Personnel ==
- Dave Wyndorf – vocals, bass, guitar, percussion, theremin, organ, bells, mellotron, producer
- Ed Mundell – bass, guitar, background vocals
- Joe Calandra – guitar, bass, background vocals
- Jon Kleiman – percussion, drums, bass, background vocals

== Chart positions ==
=== Weekly charts ===
Chart (1995–1996)	Peak position
Australian Albums (ARIA)	69
Dutch Albums (Album Top 100)	77
German Albums (Offizielle Top 100)	30
Swedish Albums (Sverigetopplistan)	17
UK Albums (OCC)	51
US Top Heatseekers (Billboard)	22

Chart (2026)	Peak position
German Rock & Metal Albums (Offizielle Top 100)	18

Singles

Year	Single	Modern Rock Tracks	Mainstream Rock Tracks
1995	"Negasonic Teenage Warhead"	26	19
