= God Says No =

Studio album by Monster Magnet
- Released: November 12, 2000
- Genre: Stoner rock; hard rock; stoner metal
- Length: 60:43
- Label: A&M
- Producer: Dave Wyndorf, Matt Hyde

Monster Magnet chronology
Powertrip (1998)	God Says No (2000)	Love Monster (2001)

Singles from God Says No
- 1. "Silver Future" Released: 2000; 2. "Heads Explode" Released: 2001; 3. "Melt" Released: 2001

Professional ratings
Aggregate scores
Source	Rating
Metacritic	67/100
Review scores
Source	Rating
AllMusic	3/5 stars
Robert Christgau	(dud)
Drowned in Sound	8/10
The Encyclopedia of Popular Music	4/5 stars
Rolling Stone	3.5/5 stars

God Says No is the fifth studio album by American rock band Monster Magnet. It was released in the United Kingdom on November 12, 2000, and in the United States on April 10, 2001. It was a commercial failure compared to their previous album, Powertrip. It was their last release recorded for A&M Records, due to problems with promotion of the album but it reached #17 in Germany. It would also be the last release with bassist Joe Calandra and drummer Jon Kleiman.

The track "Medicine", which appears on the US release, is a re-recording of a track which originally appeared on the band's 1991 album Spine of God. A music video was made for the 1991 version.

Two different music videos were produced for the song "Heads Explode" and one for "Melt", consisting mostly of live footage over the studio version of the track. The former song was featured in the film Dracula 2000 and included on its soundtrack.

== Track listing ==
All tracks written by Dave Wyndorf, except where noted.

=== UK track listing ===
No.	Title	Length
1.	"Melt"	5:44
2.	"Heads Explode"	3:48
3.	"Doomsday"	3:48
4.	"God Says No"	4:29
5.	"Kiss of the Scorpion"	4:01
6.	"All Shook Out"	4:16
7.	"Gravity Well"	3:20
8.	"My Little Friend"	4:12
9.	"Queen of You"	7:02
10.	"Down in the Jungle"	4:49
11.	"Cry"	7:23
12.	"Take It"	2:53

Bonus tracks
No.	Title	Length
13.	"Silver Future"	4:59
14.	"I Want More" (cover of Union Carbide Productions "Financial Declaration")	3:51

=== US track listing ===
No.	Title	Length
1.	"Melt"	5:44
2.	"Heads Explode"	3:48
3.	"Doomsday"	3:48
4.	"Medicine"	3:52
5.	"God Says No"	4:29
6.	"Kiss of the Scorpion"	4:01
7.	"All Shook Out"	4:16
8.	"Gravity Well"	3:20
9.	"My Little Friend"	4:12
10.	"Queen of You"	6:30
11.	"Cry"	7:23
12.	"Take It"	2:53

Bonus track
No.	Title	Length
13.	"Silver Future"	4:59

== Personnel ==
- Dave Wyndorf – vocals, guitar
- Ed Mundell – lead guitar
- Phil Caivano – guitar
- Joe Calandra – bass
- Jon Kleiman – drums

== Charts ==
=== Weekly charts ===
Chart (2001)	Peak position
German Albums Charts	17
Swedish Albums Chart	17
US Billboard 200	153

Year	Single	Mainstream Rock Tracks
2000	"Silver Future"	15
2001	"Heads Explode"	26

=== Album notes ===
- "Heads Explode" was featured on the soundtrack for the movie Dracula 2000 and "Silver Future" was featured on the soundtrack for the movie Heavy Metal 2000.
- The lyrics to "Melt" feature a reference to comic book pioneer Jack Kirby: "...I was thinking how the world should have cried // On the day Jack Kirby died..."
