= Ed Mundell =

American guitarist

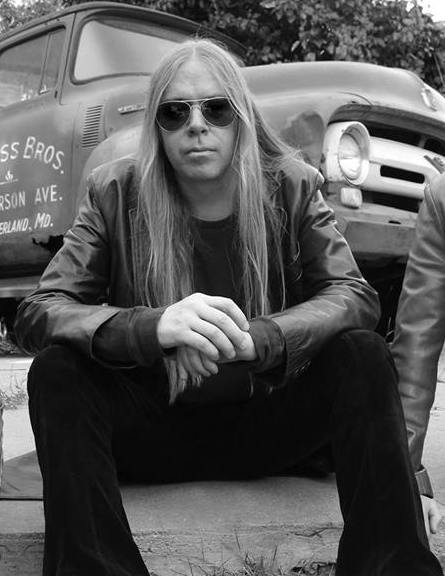
- Mundell in 2022

Background information
- Origin: New Jersey, U.S.
- Genres: Stoner rock; hard rock; space rock; psychedelic rock; heavy metal
- Occupation: Guitarist
- Formerly of: Monster Magnet; The Atomic Bitchwax; Ultra Electric Mega Galactic

Edward Mundell is an American rock guitarist. From 1992 to 2010, he was the lead guitarist for stoner rock band Monster Magnet, contributing to eight albums in total. As of 2024, Mundell contributes to various recordings and soundtracks as a studio musician based in Los Angeles.

== Career ==
Mundell is a self-taught guitar player who grew up in New Jersey. He joined Monster Magnet as lead guitarist in 1992. His first recorded appearance with the band was a 1992 single for GLitterhouse, titled Evil/elephant Bell, followed by the iconic stoner rock album 1993's Superjudge album. In the span of 18 years, he played on eight Monster Magnet albums in total between 1992 and 2010 receiving a certified gold Album for 1998's Powertrip. Mundell founded New Jersey stoner band The Atomic Bitchwax as a side project in order to keep playing in between Monster Magnet touring. He left Monster Magnet in 2010 to "collaborate with new producers, songwriters and musicians". In an interview with Everyone Loves Guitar, Mundell stated “I don’t seek out approval anymore…”

Mundell's style is heavily influenced by psychedelic 1970s rock such as Jimi Hendrix and Tommy Bolin.

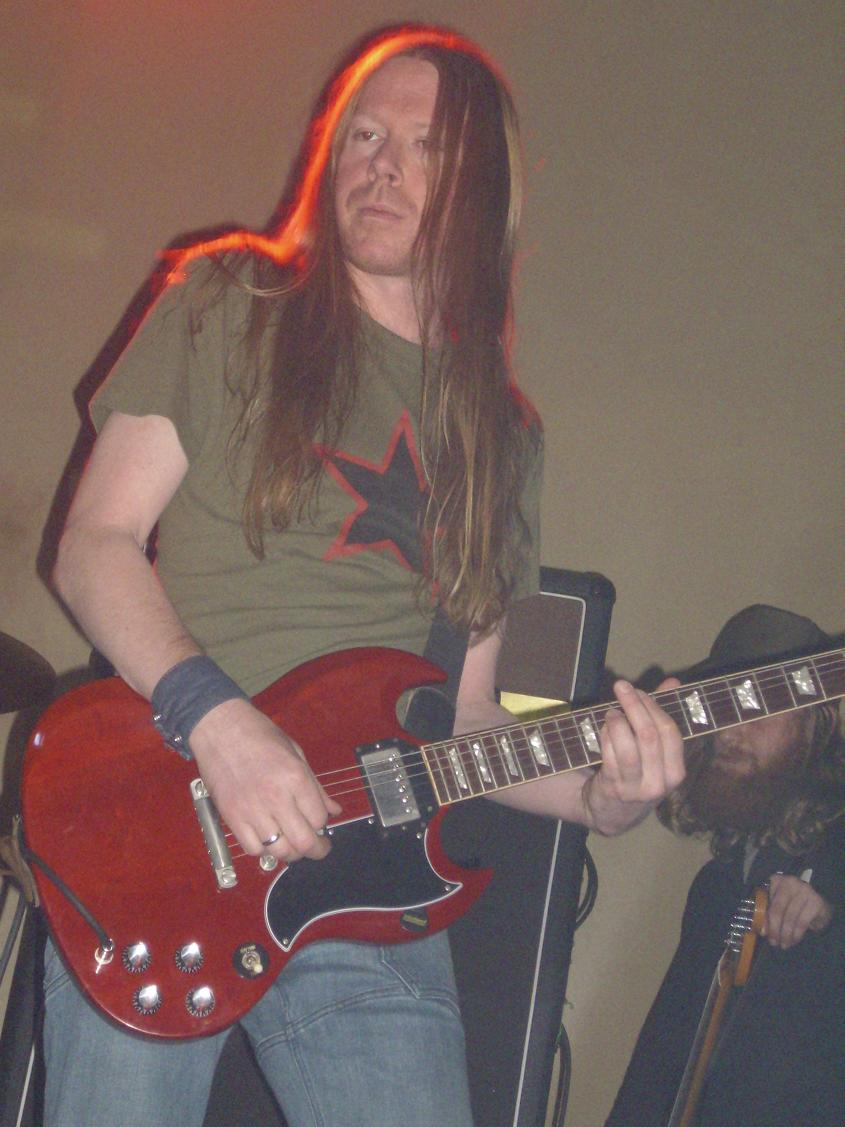
Mundell in 2008

In 2011, it was announced that Mundell had formed a new project, "The Ultra Electric Mega Galactic" (UEMG). The debut album was released January 2013 with a 2014 follow-up extended EP titled Through the Dark Matter released in conjunction with UEMG's first European tour. A new The Ultra Electric Mega Galactic Album scheduled for fall of 2025.

Mundell is currently working on a third The Ultra Electra Mega Galactic Album and actively contributes to various recordings and soundtracks as a studio musician in Los Angeles. Recent recordings with Desert stoner rock Val Chillmore and the band Volume. Ed Mundell in conjunction with Creepy Fingers Effects Pedals has released his ED MUNDELL INFINITY FUZZ PEDAL in 2009, with an update to the pedal in 2022.

== Personal life ==
Mundell has been married to film producer/rock photographer Karen M. Murphy since 2006.

== Musical equipment ==
- Ed Mundell signature Infinity Fuzz Pedal by Creepy Fingers
- Gibson SG reissue '62
- Angry Angus Stratocaster copy
- Roland Space Echo
- Ibanez Analog Delay
- ADA Flanger
- KR Musical Products Mega-Vibe
- Mesa Boogie Dual Rectifiers
- Orange Amplifiers 1976 Overdrive 120W
- Marshall Amplification cabinets
- Moog Voyager
- Mellotron D4000
- Echoplex

== Discography ==
=== Monster Magnet ===
- Evil/elephant Bell, single (1992, Glitterhouse)
- Twin Earth (1992, A&M Records)
- Superjudge (1993, A&M Records)
- Dopes to Infinity (1995, A&M Records)
- Powertrip (1998, A&M Records)
- God Says No (2001, A&M Records)
- Monolithic Baby! (2004, SPV)
- 4-Way Diablo (2007, SPV)
- Mastermind (2010, Napalm Records)

=== Atomic Bitchwax ===
- Atomic Bitchwax I (1999, Tee Pee Records)
- Atomic Bitchwax II (2000, Tee Pee Records)
- Spit Blood (2002, MeteorCity)

=== The Ultra Electric Mega Galactic ===
- The Ultra Electric Mega Galactic (2013, Orbit Unlimited Records)
- Through the Dark Matter (2014, Orbit Unlimited Records)

=== Other ===
- Daisycutter – Shithammer Deluxe (1993, Rockville Records)
- Solarized – Neanderthal Speedway (1999, Man's Ruin)
- Scene Killer – Scene Killer (2001, Meteor City)
- Gallery of Mites – Bugs on the Bluefish (2003, Meteor City)
- Michael F. Thomas – Ruby in the Dust (2003, Raindrop Records)
- "High Times" High Volume: The Stoner Rock Collection (The Formula – "Hello to Oblivion") – (2004, High Times Records)
- The Glasspack – Bridgeburner (2004, Small Stone Records)
- Percy Sledge – Shining Through the Rain (2004, Varese Records)
- Faster Pussycat – The Power and the Glory Hole (2006, Full Effect Records)
- Waxy – Chainsaw Holiday (2007, Bowlleg Records)
- Sasquatch – III (2010, Small Stone Records)
- "Awaken" Poison Tree Records compilation (Ed Mundell: Ultra Electric Mega Galactic – "7,000 Years Through Time") (2010)
- 9 Chambers – "9 Chambers" (2012 Sampson)
- Abrahma – Through the Dusty Paths of Our Lives (2012, Small Stone Records)
- The Ultra Electric Mega Galactic– The Ultra Electric Mega Galactic (2012, Orbit Unlimited Records)
- The Ultra Electric Mega Galactic– Through the Dark Matter (2014, Orbit Unlimited Records)
- Abrahma – Reflections In The Bowels Of A Bird (2015, Small Stone Records)
- Bunny Racket – Bunny Racket in Space (2020, Racket Records)
- The Freeks – Miles of Blues (2022, Heavy Psych Sounds Records)
- Snail – Fractal Altar (2022, Snail Records)
- Volume – Joy of Navigation (2024)
