= Matt Hyde =

American record producer

- Born: June 19, 1964 (age 60)
- Genres: Heavy metal
- Occupation(s): Record producer, engineer, mixer
- Years active: 1979–present
- Website: matthyde.com

Matt Hyde (born June 19, 1964) is an American record producer, engineer and mixer. He has been credited as engineer, producer, mixer and/or mastering engineer on notable albums such as No Doubt's Tragic Kingdom, Monster Magnet's Powertrip, Slayer's God Hates Us All, Hatebreed's Perseverance, Parkway Drive's Atlas, and Deftones' Gore.

== Biography ==
From 1982 to 1985, Hyde attended Berklee College of Music in Boston. While still at Berklee in 1984, he obtained an internship at Pyramid Recording Studio in Boston. After two semesters at Berklee, Hyde took a break from classes to tour for the Department of Defense overseas entertainment program, playing guitar and keyboards in several top 40 cover bands that played shows at U.S. military bases in foreign countries throughout Europe and the Pacific. When he returned to the U.S., he began working at recording studios, first in Boston and from 1989 in Los Angeles.

While working as a staff engineer at Paramount Recording Studios in Los Angeles, Hyde worked with Cypress Hill in preparation for their debut album. He produced several other notable hip hop acts including Freestyle Fellowship, Boo Yaa T.R.I.B.E., and Daddy Freddy.

Matt Hyde met Perry Farrell and produced (with Perry) tracks on the debut album for Porno for Pyros, as well as Good God's Urge. Hyde was so involved with the group that he appeared on the artwork for the single "Sadness" (he is in the center holding the small keyboard), as well as in the video for that song.

In 2006, Hyde was recognized for engineering Jonny Lang's album Turn Around, which won a Grammy in the Best Rock or Rap Gospel category.

== Discography ==
Artist	Album	Credit	Accolades
Red Sun Rising	Thread	Produced, engineered	
Treble Charger	Wide Awake Bored	Produced, engineered	
Big Jesus	Oneiric	Co-produced, engineered, mixed	
Deftones	Gore[7]	Co-produced, engineered, mixed	#2 debut, Billboard Top 200
ASG	Blood Drive	Produced, engineered, mixed	Named #13 best album of 2013 by Spin Magazine
Parkway Drive	Atlas	Produced, engineered, mixed	Triple J "Album of the Year" nominee (2012)
Deftones	Koi No Yokan	Engineered	
The 69 Eyes	Back in Blood	Produced, engineered, mixed	
Pride Tiger	The Lucky Ones	Produced, engineered, mixed, co-wrote	Juno nominee for "Rock Album of the Year"
Hatebreed	Perseverance	Produced, engineered	CMJ Loud Rock Album of the Year
Slayer	God Hates Us All	Produced, engineered, mixed	Includes "Disciple" which was nominated for a Grammy for "Best Metal Performance"
Monster Magnet	Powertrip	Produced, engineered, mixed	
Children of Bodom	Relentless Reckless Forever	Produced, engineered, mixed	
Nekrogoblikon	Heavy Meta	Produced	
Behemoth	The Satanist	Mixed	
