= Monster Magnet =

American rock band

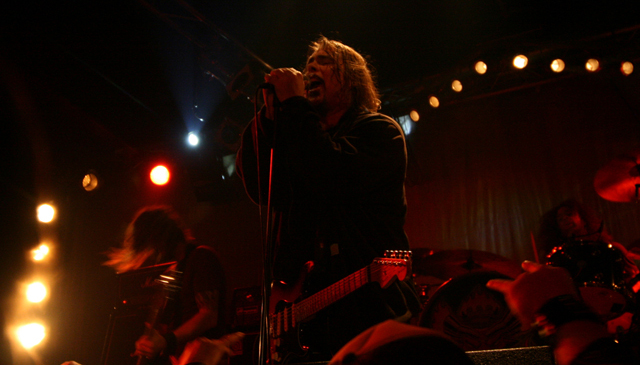
- Monster Magnet live in Hungary, 2008

Background information
- Origin: Red Bank, New Jersey, U.S.
- Genres: Stoner rock; space rock; hard rock; heavy metal
- Years active: 1989–present
- Labels: Circuit; Glitterhouse; Caroline; Atypeek; A&M; SPV; Napalm
- Members: Dave Wyndorf; Garrett Sweeny; Phil Caivano; Bob Pantella; Alec Morton
- Past members: Ed Mundell; Joe Calandra; Jon Kleiman; Michael Wildwood; John McBain; Tim Cronin; Jim Baglino; Chris Kosnik

Monster Magnet is an American rock band formed in Red Bank, New Jersey, in 1989 by Dave Wyndorf (vocals and guitar), John McBain (guitar), and Tim Cronin (vocals and drums). The band has since undergone several lineup changes, with Wyndorf remaining the only constant member. Monster Magnet has released 11 studio albums to date and is best known for their 1990s hits "Negasonic Teenage Warhead" and "Space Lord". The band is also credited with developing and popularizing the stoner rock genre, along with Masters of Reality, Kyuss, Fu Manchu, and Sleep.

== History ==
=== Beginnings and Spine of God (1989–1992) ===
Original names considered for the band included Dog of Mystery, Airport 75, Triple Bad Acid, and King Fuzz before they ultimately settled on Monster Magnet, a name taken from a 1960s toy made by Wham-O, which Wyndorf liked as a child.

In 1989, Monster Magnet released two demo cassettes: Forget About Life, I'm High on Dope and I'm Stoned, What Ya Gonna Do About It? The band's first "official" release was the single "Lizard Johnny/Freakshop USA" on Long Island-based Circuit Records. The first demo and single were recorded as a three-piece (McBain on bass, Wyndorf on guitar and vocals, and Cronin on drums and vocals). Before the second demo, Tom Diello joined on drums, and McBain and Cronin switched to guitar and bass, respectively. This new lineup featured McBain on guitar, Wyndorf on guitar and vocals, Cronin on bass and vocals, and Diello on drums. The EP Monster Magnet followed on Glitterhouse Records of Germany, containing the songs "Snake Dance" and "Nod Scene" (both of which would appear again on Spine of God), and "Tractor" (which would be re-recorded later for Powertrip).

In 1990, the band signed with Caroline Records and released the single "Murder/Tractor." Cronin left shortly after, although he would remain involved in the background, particularly at live shows, contributing to auditory effects, lights, and visuals for many years. After Cronin's departure, Joe Calandra joined on bass. In 1991, Monster Magnet released their first full-length album, Spine of God, on the labels Go Get Organized/Atypeek Music, Primo Scree, Glitterhouse Records, and Caroline Records. Shortly afterward, drummer Tom Diello left the band and was replaced by Jon Kleiman. Although not a commercial success, Spine of God was praised by critics and is hailed as one of the classics of the stoner rock genre. It is also considered a major influence on the genre. The album included the single "Medicine" (which would be re-recorded 10 years later on God Says No), which was also the band's first music video. The band followed with a tour alongside rising grunge band Soundgarden. The tour helped the band secure a recording contract with major record label A&M Records.

Their final release with Caroline Records was an EP titled Tab, which included, among two other marathon-length songs, a 32-minute track called "Tab...." The Tab EP was recorded before Spine of God, yet released afterward. McBain left the band soon after and was replaced by Atomic Bitchwax guitarist Ed Mundell.

=== A&M Records era and popularity (1992–2002) ===
In 1992, Monster Magnet signed with A&M Records, and their first album on the label, Superjudge, was released the following year. Despite being released on a major label, it fared poorly commercially. Like its predecessor, Superjudge became an influential release in the stoner rock genre. The songs "Twin Earth" and "Face Down" were released as singles (with accompanying videos), but they did little to promote the album. In 1995, Monster Magnet released their third studio album, Dopes to Infinity. The album included the band's first hit single, "Negasonic Teenage Warhead," which benefited from a music video that received regular rotation on MTV. Still, the album was not as successful as the band had hoped.

After touring in support of Dopes to Infinity, Wyndorf moved to Las Vegas, Nevada, to begin working on Powertrip (1998), a breakthrough hit that finally earned the band a gold record. Guitarist Phil Caivano joined the band in 1998. "Space Lord," the album's first single, was a major radio hit, and the band toured with successful acts such as Aerosmith, Metallica and Rob Zombie. The band also toured as one of the opening acts for Hole and Marilyn Manson on their joint Beautiful Monsters Tour. Following the well-publicized falling out between the outspoken vocalists of Hole and Marilyn Manson, Monster Magnet continued touring with Marilyn Manson and opened the first three shows of their Rock is Dead Tour. The songs "Powertrip," "Temple of Your Dreams" and "See You in Hell" also received airplay on rock radio stations. The album charted at number 97 on the Billboard 200 and later went multi-platinum.

After a two-year tour supporting Powertrip, the band released God Says No (2001), which charted at number 153 on Billboard. However, it failed to match the commercial success of the band's previous release. Following the album's release, Joe Calandra and Jon Kleiman left the band. They were replaced by Jim Baglino and Michael Wildwood, who recorded Monolithic Baby!. After a short stint, Wildwood was replaced by former Love Among Freaks drummer Bob Pantella. During this period, the band also parted ways with A&M Records.

Following the split from A&M Records, Monster Magnet wrote and performed "Live for the Moment," which served as the entrance theme for WWE wrestler Matt Hardy from 2002 to 2010. The song also appeared on the WWF Forceable Entry compilation.

=== Monolithic Baby! and 4-Way Diablo (2003–2008) ===
In 2003, Monster Magnet released Greatest Hits, a double album featuring their best songs, some rarities, and music videos from their time with A&M. They then signed to the European label SPV, and in early 2004 released Monolithic Baby! throughout Europe. The US release followed in May on SPV America. The band had a minor hit with the song "Unbroken (Hotel Baby)."

In March 2005, Caivano departed after seven years of service in a split described as amicable by Wyndorf. A follow-up to Monolithic Baby! was expected in March 2006 to coincide with their European tour, along with re-releases of Spine of God and Tab, both featuring new artwork and liner notes; however, the tour and album releases failed to materialize.

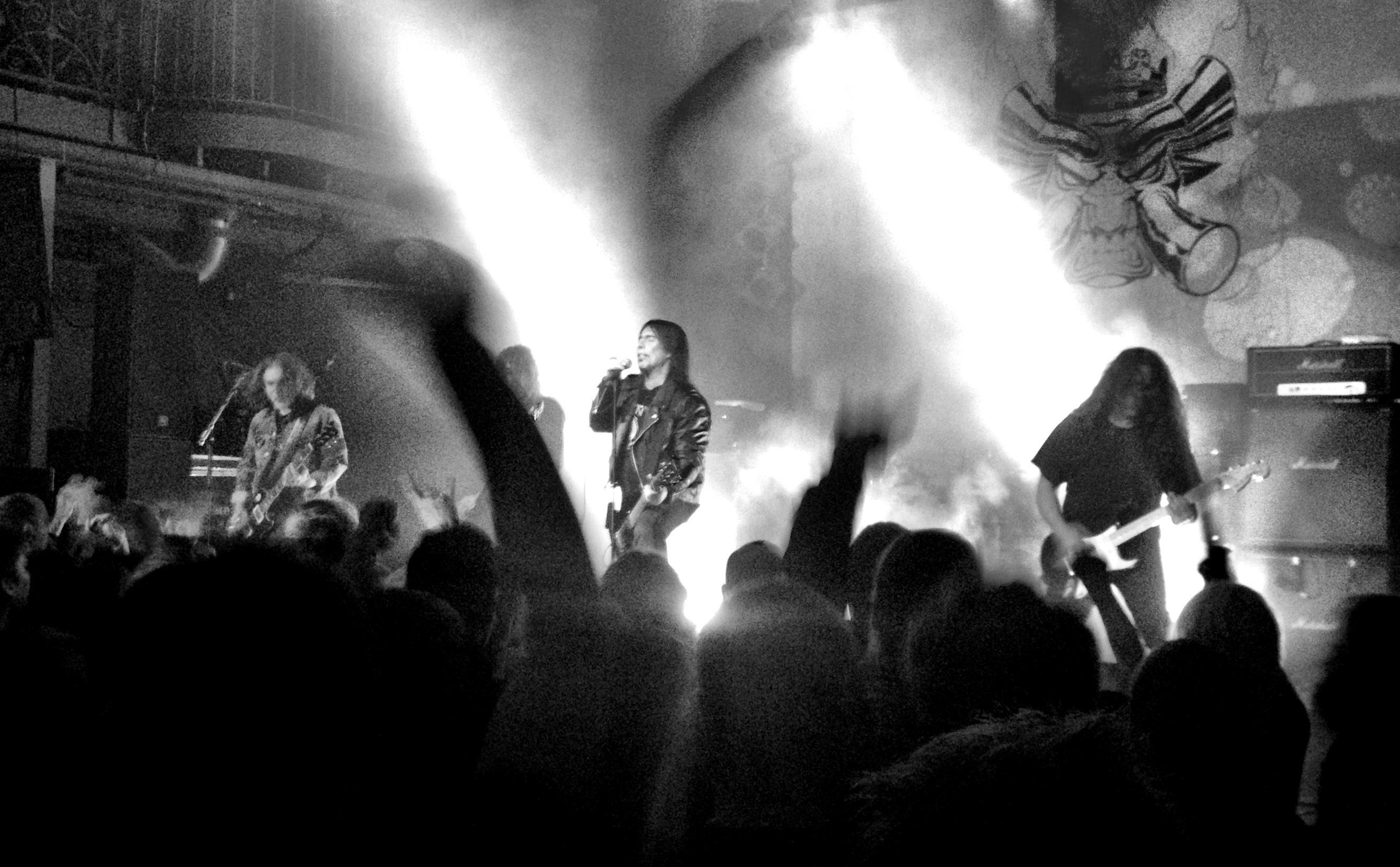
Monster Magnet live in 2012

On February 27, 2006, Dave Wyndorf overdosed on prescription drugs and was hospitalised.

In 2007, it was announced that Monster Magnet would release a new album, 4-Way Diablo, which had been held back for a year because of Wyndorf's overdose. It was released later that year. Also in 2007, another greatest hits collection, 20th Century Masters – The Millennium Collection: The Best of Monster Magnet, was released. "Powertrip" was used as the official theme song for the WWE pay-per-view event No Way Out 2007.

Prior to Monster Magnet's 2008 European tour, Caivano returned to the band.

=== Mastermind, Last Patrol and Mindfucker (2009–2019) ===
On November 24, 2009, it was announced that Monster Magnet had signed a new deal with Napalm Records. The band also announced that they would enter the studio in January 2010 to record a new album for a summer release. According to Wyndorf, the band is very pleased with the label, which is "doing a good job."

The band embarked on a massive European tour in August 2010. A new album, Mastermind, was released in October of that year, and the band again hit the road in November–December 2010 to promote it. During that tour, Ed Mundell left the band after 18 years "to collaborate with other musicians and producers," forming The Ultra Electric Mega Galactic. Wyndorf stated that Garrett Sweeny (Riotgod) replaced Ed on the tour.

In the fall of 2011, Monster Magnet toured and performed the seminal Dopes to Infinity record in its entirety throughout Europe. One year later, they did the same with their 1992 album Spine of God.

Last Patrol was released in North America on October 15, 2013. Monster Magnet's website also announced a North American tour for the album, their first in 10 years. However, the remaining shows in mid-December were cancelled because of Wyndorf's influenza. The tour resumed in Europe in January and continued through February. Wyndorf stated that the band would play the entire Last Patrol at each show.

In November 2014, a reworked version of Last Patrol called Milking the Stars: A Re-Imagining of Last Patrol was released, and in October 2015, a reworked version of Mastermind called Cobras and Fire (The Mastermind Redux) was released. Featuring re-recordings and new arrangements, they contained a less polished, psychedelic production. In 2016, the band reissued the A&M era LPs with bonus content via Spinefarm Records. They toured Europe again.

Monster Magnet's first studio album in five years, Mindfucker, was released on March 23, 2018.

=== A Better Dystopia (2020–present) ===
In December 2020, Monster Magnet began work on their 11th studio album, A Better Dystopia, a collection of song covers. That same month, Loudwire included it in their "88 of 2021's Most Anticipated Rock + Metal Albums" list. The band released the first single from the album on March 23, 2021: "Mr. Destroyer," a cover of the Poobah song. A Better Dystopia was released two months later. Monster Magnet toured Europe in the fall of 2024 as part of the band's 35th anniversary. The last 10 dates of the 35th-anniversary European tour were cancelled due to Wyndorf falling ill.

On July 8, 2025, original Monster Magnet drummer Tim Cronin died from ALS. He was 63.

== Musical style and influences ==
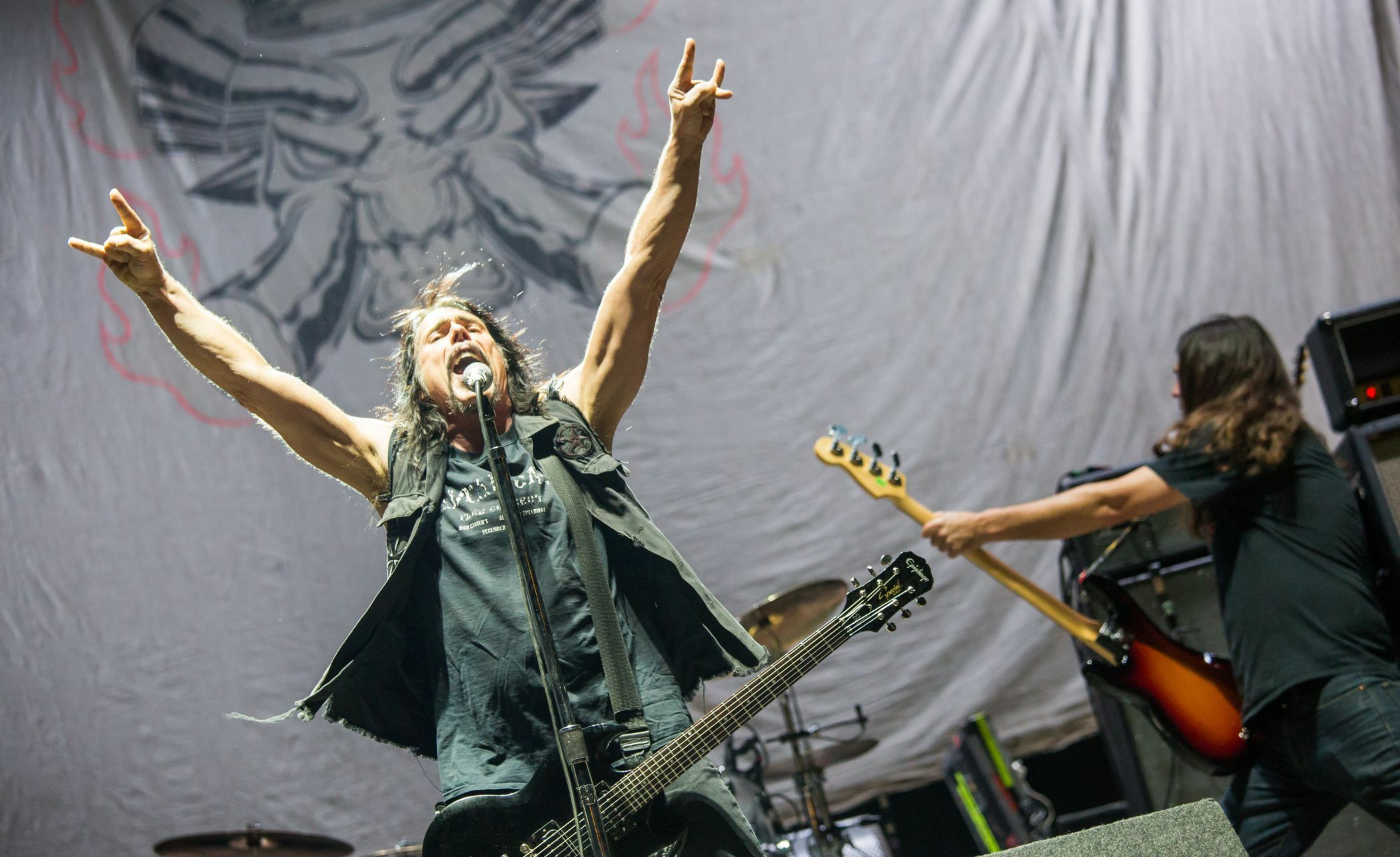
Monster Magnet performing in 2017

Monster Magnet is noted for having a "heavy and spacy sound." They have been described as a "space-metal outfit [that] helped codify the stoner-rock template with their landmark efforts in the early 1990s." The album Superjudge, according to Metal Injection, "helped forge a sound that crafted a band and a genre." Their sound has been described as "heady heavy metal." Monster Magnet is also regarded as space rock, hard rock, psychedelic rock, garage rock and as part of the first wave of alternative metal. Their style is heavily influenced by 1970s space rock bands such as Hawkwind and psychedelia.

In addition to recording covers such as Black Sabbath's "Into the Void" (Master of Reality, 1971) and Hawkwind's "Brainstorm" (Doremi Fasol Latido, 1972), Wyndorf sometimes incorporated elements of space rock staples into his own songs. For instance, the Dopes to Infinity title track borrows some of its lyrics from "Lord of Light" (ibid.), and Superjudge's "Twin Earth" is a reinterpretation of Captain Beyond's "Mesmerization Eclipse" (Captain Beyond, 1972). The main guitar riff to the track Dopes to Infinity is lifted from The Sir Lord Baltimore song "Woman Tamer" (Sir Lord Baltimore, 1971). The band has cited the British band Depeche Mode as an influence on its music. They covered Depeche Mode's "Black Celebration" for For the Masses, a 1998 Depeche Mode tribute album.

Wyndorf is a fan of 1960s comic books, particularly those by Jack Kirby. He mentions Kirby in the song "Melt" from God Says No. He mentions Marvel Comics characters MODOK (on "Baby Götterdämmerung" from Powertrip) and Ego the Living Planet (on "Ego, The Living Planet" from Dopes to Infinity). "Mindless Ones" from the album Last Patrol mentions the race of the same name, Dormammu, Vishanti and The Ancient One from Marvel's Doctor Strange mythos. "All Shook Out" from God Says No mentions "children of the atom," a reference to the X-Men. Marvel's Fantastic Four are mentioned in the song "The Titan Who Cried Like a Baby" on Mastermind.

== In other media ==
=== Television ===
The television drama series Sons of Anarchy frequently used Monster Magnet tracks. Featured songs include "Monolithic" in season 1 (episode 10); "Radiation Day," "Slut Machine," and "Freeze and Pixelate" in season 2 (episodes 1, 4, and 13); and "100 Million Miles" in season 3 (episode 12).

Tracks from the 2001 album God Says No have appeared in television series, including the sci-fi series Alphas ("Heads Explode") and The Shield, which featured the track "God Says No" in an early episode.

The reality series Viva La Bam used several tracks from Monolithic Baby!, such as "Slut Machine," "Supercruel," and "Unbroken" during multiple episodes.

=== Film ===
Tracks from the 1995 album Dopes to Infinity were included on the soundtrack for The Matrix ("Look to Your Orb for the Warning") and The Girl Next Door ("Dopes to Infinity"). The soundtrack of the 1994 movie S.F.W. features an early, otherwise unreleased version of a song originally from Dopes to Infinity, "Negasonic Teenage Warhead." The 1999 film Beowulf features the track "Lord 13" from Monster Magnet's early 1990s EP Tab during its end credits. The film Boys (1996) features the track "The Secret."

Several tracks from the 1998 Monster Magnet album Powertrip have been featured in film soundtracks, including "See You in Hell" in Bride of Chucky (1998), "Powertrip" in Soldier (1998), "Crop Circle" in Urban Legend (1998), and "Space Lord" in Talladega Nights: The Ballad of Ricky Bobby (2006). "Big God," the bonus track on the Japanese edition of the album (and also B-side to "Space Lord"), appears in The Crow: Salvation (2000).

Tracks from the 2001 album God Says No have also been used in films. Heavy Metal 2000 (2000) includes "Silver Future," Made (2001) includes "Down in the Jungle," and Dracula 2000 (2000) includes "Heads Explode"; part of the music video for "Heads Explode" is also shown in Dracula 2000. The 2004 mountain bike film New World Disorder V – Disorderly Conduct features "Radiation Day" and "Slut Machine" on its soundtrack.

Monster Magnet contributed a cover of the MC5 song "Kick Out the Jams" to the Varsity Blues soundtrack. They also performed their track "Master of Light" from Monolithic Baby! live in a scene in the movie Torque.

The Marvel Comics character Negasonic Teenage Warhead, featured in the 2016 film Deadpool and its sequel, is named after the song of the same name from the band's album Dopes to Infinity.

=== Video games ===
- Sony Computer Entertainment's 2007 PlayStation 3 release MotorStorm and Ubisoft's 2018 release Far Cry 5 featured "Powertrip" from Powertrip.
- Electronic Arts' early 1990s release Road Rash featured "Dinosaur Vacuum" from Superjudge.
- Activision Value's 2006 release American Chopper featured "Space Lord."
- MercurySteam's 2017 release Raiders of the Broken Planet, later renamed Spacelords, featured "Space Lord" as the opening theme.

=== Promotional use ===
- The Crusty Demons Freestyle Motocross series has used both "Powertrip" from Powertrip and "Melt" from God Says No.
- "Live for the Moment" was the theme song of WWE wrestler Matt Hardy and was featured on WWF Forceable Entry.
- "Space Lord" is used in a commercial for the Swedish chain store JC (Jeans and Clothes).
- "Powertrip" from Powertrip was the official theme song for No Way Out 2007 for WWE.

== Band members ==
Current members

- Dave Wyndorf – vocals, rhythm guitar (1989–present), lead guitar (1989, 2010)
- Phil Caivano – rhythm and lead guitar (1998–2005, 2008–present)
- Bob Pantella – drums (2003–present)
- Garrett Sweeny – lead guitar (2010–present)
- Alec Morton – bass (2020–present)

Former members

- John McBain – lead guitar (1989–1992), bass (1989)
- Tim Cronin – vocals (1989–1990), drums (1989), bass (1989–1990; died 2025)
- Ed Mundell – lead guitar (1992–2010)
- Tom Diello – drums (1989–1991)
- Joe Calandra – bass (1990–2001)
- Jon Kleiman – drums (1991–2001)
- Jim Baglino – bass (2001–2013)
- Michael Wildwood – drums (2001–2003)
- Chris Kosnik – bass (2013–2020)

== Members' other projects ==
As teenagers, Wyndorf and Caivano played in the punk/power pop band Shrapnel from the late 1970s until 1985. The band was managed by Legs McNeil, released two indie singles and an EP on Elektra Records, played with the Ramones at CBGB, featured guitar from future producer Daniel Rey, and appeared on the Uncle Floyd Show and in a Frank Miller issue of The Amazing Spider-Man.

Founding member John McBain joined the psychedelic/garage-influenced bands Hater, Wellwater Conspiracy and Devilhead after leaving Monster Magnet, playing alongside members of Soundgarden, Malfunkshun, The Walkabouts, Pearl Jam and other well-known Seattle bands, releasing several albums until the early 2000s. He also contributed to projects such as The Desert Sessions and The Freeks, and released the solo album The In-Flight Feature in 2006 with guest appearances by Cronin on guitar and Kleiman on drums.

Since the mid-1990s, Cronin and Kleiman have fronted The Ribeye Bros. In 2003, Pantella mixed and played bass on The Glasspack's Bridgeburner album. Mundell also played lead guitar on The Glasspack's track "Peepshow." The album was released on Small Stone Records in May 2004.

In 2010, Ed Mundell left Monster Magnet to collaborate with new musicians and producers. In 2011, he formed The Ultra Electric Mega Galactic, and has contributed to albums for Sasquatch, Abrahma, and 9 Chambers. His solo album Space Time Employment Agency was released in 2013.

In 2007, Pantella joined The Atomic Bitchwax. Also in 2007, Pantella and Baglino formed RIOTGOD, along with Garrett Sweeny (of Psycho Daisy) and Mark Sunshine.

In 2010, Pantella appeared on LadyKiller's self-titled debut release. He is credited with playing drums on 13 of the 16 songs, in addition to having tracked more than half of the album at his recording studio in Sayreville, New Jersey.

In 2010, the first single "American Dream" was released on One Voice by Capricorn, a band formed by Phil Caivano, Todd Youth (of Murphy's Law, Danzig, Ace Frehley, Glen Campbell and The Chelsea Smiles) and Karl Rosqvist (of Danzig, The Chelsea Smiles and Michael Monroe).

Chris Kosnik has played in The Atomic Bitchwax since its formation in 1993.

== Discography ==
=== Studio albums ===
- Spine of God (1991)
- Superjudge (1993)
- Dopes to Infinity (1995)
- Powertrip (1998)
- God Says No (2000)
- Monolithic Baby! (2004)
- 4-Way Diablo (2007)
- Mastermind (2010)
- Last Patrol (2013)
- Mindfucker (2018)
- A Better Dystopia (2021)

=== Remix/redux albums ===
- Milking the Stars: A Re-Imagining of Last Patrol (2014)
- Cobras and Fire (The Mastermind Redux) (2015)

=== EPs ===
- Monster Magnet (1990)
- Tab (1991)
- Love Monster (2001)

=== Compilation albums ===
- It's a Satanic Drug Thing...You Wouldn't Understand (1992)
- Greatest Hits (2003)
- The Best of Monster Magnet – The Millennium Collection (2007)
- Space Lords (2012)

=== Singles ===
Year	Song	Peak chart positions					Album
Year	Song	US Alt	US Main	CAN	CAN Alt	UK	Album
1990	"Lizard Johnny"	—	—	—	—	—	Monster Magnet
1990	"Murder"	—	—	—	—	—	Monster Magnet
1993	"Twin Earth"	—	—	—	—	—	Superjudge
1993	"Cyclops Revolution"	—	—	—	—	—	Superjudge
1993	"Face Down"	—	—	—	—	—	Superjudge
1993	"Cage Around the Sun"	—	—	—	—	—	Superjudge
1995	"Negasonic Teenage Warhead"	26	19	—	17	49	Dopes to Infinity
1995	"Dopes to Infinity"	—	—	—	—	58	Dopes to Infinity
1995	"Dead Christmas"	—	—	—	—	—	Dopes to Infinity
1995	"Look to Your Orb for the Warning"	—	—	—	—	—	Dopes to Infinity
1998	"Space Lord"	29	3	—	5	45	Powertrip
1998	"Powertrip"	—	20	49	8	39	Powertrip
1999	"Temple of Your Dreams"	—	25	—	—	—	Powertrip
1999	"See You in Hell"	—	—	—	—	—	Powertrip
2000	"Silver Future"	—	15	—	—	—	God Says No
2001	"Heads Explode"	—	26	—	—	—	God Says No
2001	"Melt"	—	—	—	—	—	God Says No
2004	"Unbroken (Hotel Baby)"	—	31	—	—	—	Monolithic Baby!
2004	"Monolithic"	—	—	—	—	—	Monolithic Baby!
2007	"Wall of Fire"	—	—	—	—	—	4-Way Diablo
2010	"Gods and Punks"	—	—	—	—	—	Mastermind
2011	"100 Million Miles"	—	—	—	—	—	Mastermind
2013	"Mindless Ones"	—	—	—	—	—	Last Patrol
2013	"The Duke (of Supernature)"	—	—	—	—	—	Last Patrol
2018	"Mindfucker"	—	—	—	—	—	Mindfucker
2018	"Ejection"	—	—	—	—	—	Mindfucker
2021	"Mr. Destroyer"	—	—	—	—	—	A Better Dystopia
2021	"Motorcycle (Straight to Hell)"	—	—	—	—	—	A Better Dystopia
"—" denotes a release that did not chart.
