= Spine of God =

Studio album by Monster Magnet
- Released: 1991
- Recorded: 1991
- Studios: Subterranean Sound, (High Street, USA) Long Branch, New Jersey
- Genres: Acid rock; hard rock; psychedelic rock; heavy metal; stoner rock; grunge
- Length: 49:48
- Labels: Caroline, Glitterhouse, Go Get Organized
- Producers: Dave Wyndorf, John McBain

Monster Magnet chronology
Tab (1991)	Spine of God (1991)	Superjudge (1993)

2006 reissue
- Cover of the 2006 reissue

Spine of God is the debut studio album by American rock band Monster Magnet, released in Europe in 1991 and in the United States the following year. The album represents one of the earliest examples of the emerging 1990s sub-genre of stoner rock. Spine of God did not perform well commercially upon its initial release, but was praised by critics and would later be considered a major influence on stoner rock bands. The song "Medicine" was released as a single with accompanying music video.

== Overview ==
Spine of God features a cover of Grand Funk Railroad's "Sin's a Good Man's Brother". It was re-released in March 2006 on Steamhammer records with new artwork, new liner notes, compressed dynamic range, and a previously unreleased demo version of "Ozium" included as a bonus track.

== Critical reception ==
Professional ratings
Review scores
Source	Rating
AllMusic	4.5/5 stars
Blabbermouth.net	9.5/10
Collector's Guide to Heavy Metal	7/10
Kerrang!	4/5 stars

The Philadelphia Inquirer called the album "a mixture of grunge, metal, and late '60s acid rock, loaded with feedback noise, and more than a little depravity". Spin, in its December 1991 issue, referred to the album as "a total KO" while comparing it favorably to the work of grunge rock icons of the day such as Soundgarden, Tad, and Mudhoney; it was listed on Spin's "Ten Best Albums of the Year You Didn't Hear" for 1991.

== Track listing ==
All tracks are written by Dave Wyndorf, except where noted.

No.	Title	Length
1.	"Pill Shovel" (McBain, Wyndorf)	4:00
2.	"Medicine"	3:21
3.	"Nod Scene" (McBain, Wyndorf)	6:46
4.	"Black Mastermind" (McBain, Wyndorf)	8:13
5.	"Zodiac Lung"	4:44
6.	"Spine of God"	8:02
7.	"Snake Dance"	3:10
8.	"Sin's a Good Man's Brother" (Mark Farner)	3:31
9.	"Ozium"	8:01
Total length:		49:48

== Personnel ==
Musicians

- Dave Wyndorf – guitar, vocals
- John McBain – guitar
- Joe Calandra – bass
- Jon Kleiman – drums
- Tim Cronin – (credited as "Dope/Lights/Center of the Universe")

Production

- Dave Wyndorf – producer
- John McBain – producer
- Stacy "Springdale" Phelon – engineer

Art and design

- Rob Leecock – bullgod design
- Samantha Muccini – photography
- Reed Linkletter Jr. – art direction
- Alexander von Wieding – reissue artwork
