= Cassette Store Day =

Annual event celebrating the cassette tape

- Observed by: Record shops Audiophiles; Musicians; Record labels
- Type: Cultural, commercial
- Celebrations: Live performances, special music releases
- Frequency: annual

Cassette Store Day was an international, annual observance intended to recognise the value of Compact Cassettes as a music format. Cassette Store Day was first held in 2013. The celebration was inspired by Record Store Day, which acknowledges the importance of record stores and the vinyl music format.

== Origin ==
Cassette Store Day was conceived by a group of record labels based in the UK. In a blog post for NME, BBC Radio 1 DJ Jen Long explained that she collaborated with Steve Rose of Sexbeat/Transgressive Records and Matt Flag of Suplex Cassettes to establish the observance. According to Long, although Cassette Store Day was inspired by Record Store Day, the intention of Cassette Store Day is focused on celebrating cassettes rather than supporting shops—whereas the latter is the main goal of RSD. The first Cassette Store Day was observed on 7 September 2013. More than twenty-eight shops, including Rough Trade in London, participated by stocking special limited-edition cassettes. Some stores also hosted live performances.

Cassette Store Day 2013 releases were led by the labels Sexbeat, Kissability, and Suplex Cassettes. New releases for Cassette Store Day 2013 included albums by Fucked Up and Fair Ohs, as well as cassettes reissues of material by artists including The Flaming Lips, At the Drive-In, and Haim. Despite a major decline in popularity after the introduction of compact discs, cassette sales are slowly increasing along with sales of other analogue formats.

In June 2014, Cassette Store Day confirmed that the observance would continue into a second year. Despite continually unsteady cassette sales in recent years, founder Steve Rose expressed confidence in the cassette tape's "currentness" in the "DIY and underground scenes due to its affordability and ease". By 2016, shops in the US and UK were joined by participants in Australia, New Zealand, Germany, France, and Japan. Upon entering its seventh year in 2019, International Cassette Store Day was managed in collaboration by Blak Hand Records (UK), Burger Records (USA) and Side-B Creations (Japan).

Cassette Store Day was officially retired in 2020, but has since been resurrected by Tapehead City as “Cassette Week”.

== Reception ==
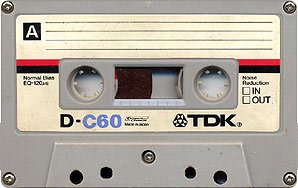
Cassette Store Day aims to repopularize Compact Cassettes.

Founder Steve Rose did not anticipate resounding success for Cassette Store Day. However, he has predicted that the inexpensive and easy manufacturing of cassettes will help to steadily encourage their reintroduction. On the other hand, Bobby Owsinski wrote in Forbes that cassettes were too dilapidated to see the same resurgence as vinyl records.

Writing for Washington City Paper, Sean Gray expressed reservations about Cassette Store Day and Record Store Day. Gray observes that as cassettes and records become more popular, prices may rise to exorbitant rates, making it difficult for collectors to enjoy the formats. Emma Garland of The Four Oh Five stated that while Record Store Day may overshadow small labels and artists, Cassette Store Day gives small labels better access to the celebration of analogue formats.

== Releases ==
=== 2013 ===
In 2013, more than 50 cassette editions of releases were issued for Cassette Store Day. The three founding labels, Sexbeat, Kissability, and Suplex, were supplemented by 4AD, Transgressive Records, Bella Union, and other small independent labels. Exclusive releases and reissues included:

- Deerhunter – Monomania (4AD)
- The Flaming Lips – The Terror (Bella Union)
- Fucked Up – Hidden World (Sexbeat)
- Haim – Forever (Polydor Records)
- Los Campesinos! – A Good Night For a Fist Fight (Kissability)
- Twink – Think Pink (Burger Records)

=== 2014 ===
Over 300 cassette releases were coordinated for the second Cassette Store Day. Notable releases included:

- J Dilla - Donuts (Stones Throw Records)
- Andrew Jackson Jihad – Christmas Island (SideOneDummy Records)
- Julian Casablancas + The Voidz - Tyranny (Cult Records)
- The Gaslight Anthem – The '59 Sound (SideOneDummy Records)
- Karen O - Crush Songs (Cult Records)
- They Might Be Giants – They'll Need a Crane, (She Was A) Hotel Detective, They Might Be Giants, Lincoln (Idlewild Recordings)

=== 2015 ===
In 2015, over 100 titles were released exclusively for Cassette Store Day. Shops in the US, UK, Australia, New Zealand, and Germany participated. Exclusive releases included:

- Alex G – Beach Music (Domino Recording Company)
- Beach Slang – HERE, I MADE THIS FOR YOU (Polyvinyl Record Co.)
- Foals – What Went Down (Warner Bros. Records)
- The Gaslight Anthem – The '59 Sound, American Slang (SideOneDummy Records)
- Green Day – Dookie (Burger Records)
- Kylesa – Spiral Shadow, Ultraviolet (Season of Mist)
- Motörhead – Bad Magic (UDR)
- Muse – Drones (Warner Bros. Records, Helium 3)
- Philiac - This Appalling Ocean

=== 2016 ===
Cassette Store Day 2016 took place on 8 October 2016. In addition to the original founding labels, CSD was to be led in the US by Burger Records, in Germany by Späti Palace and Mansions and Millions, in France by Balades Sonores, and in Japan by VSI.

=== 2017 ===
Cassette Store Day 2017 took place on 14 October 2017. Management for International Cassette Store Day was assumed by Brit Williams (Blak Hand Records), Sean Bohrman (Burger Records) and Takamasa Endo (VSI). Events took place in the US, Japan, UK, China, Australia, Indonesia, and Europe.

Having taken over UK duties from Cassette Store Day's founders, Brit Williams stated "For the past few years, Cassette Store Day has been the most anticipated release we do at Blak Hand. It gives us a chance to showcase some of our best bands by throwing out a mixtape so people can hear the distinct sound of what we do. I know for many, CSD is the perfect chance to get music heard to broader audience and bring people together through the art of the tape. We’re thrilled to once again celebrate all things analogue and help bring attention to some up and coming artists and labels in the country." Sean Bohrman of Burger Records also commented on the success that CSD has had at increasing the relevancy of cassettes.

Over 300 bands and labels worldwide participated in the event. Notable releases included The White Stripes reissues of their first three albums, The White Stripes, De Stijl and White Blood Cells which were printed onto white tape exclusively for Cassette Store Day through Third Man Records.

=== 2019 ===
The 2019 edition featured Oil Wars by Philiac, Jay Reatard's Blood Visions, Old LP by that dog., and Midi Swamp from Dr. Dog but print runs were curtailed by a shortage of ferric oxide.

=== 2022 ===
In 2022 Cassette Week was launched by Tapehead City in homage to CSD. It took place from 9th to 15th of October.

=== 2024 ===
For 2024, Cassette Store Day is being relaunched in the UK as 'Cassette Week UK' by duplicators Disc-Phalanx in collaboration with Coventry based indie store, Just Dropped In, and is set to take place between October 14th - 20th.
