= The Way Forward (disambiguation) =

The Way Forward was a restructuring plan by the Ford Motor company

The Way Forward may also refer to:

- The Way Forward: Renewing the American Idea, 2014 book by Paul Ryan
- The Way Forward (Intervals album), 2017
- The Way Forward (Black Tusk album), 2024
