= Years in Black =

Compilation album by Black Tusk
- Released: November 6, 2020
- Genres: Sludge metal; hardcore punk; stoner metal
- Length: 46:12
- Label: Another Riff Raff Label

Black Tusk chronology
T.C.B.T. (2018)	Years in Black (2020)	The Way Forward (2024)

Years in Black is a compilation album from American sludge metal band Black Tusk. It was released digitally in 2020. A physical release was issued in 2021 by Another Riff Raff Label.

== Background ==
Years in Black is a collection of B-sides and rare tracks, including songs from several split releases. "Beneath" and "Fatal Kiss" were originally released in 2009 on split 7" singles with The Holy Mountain and Fight Amp. Both songs were later included as bonus tracks on a remastered edition of Passage Through Purgatory. "Rift of Men", "Cease Fire", and "Death March" are from a 2009 split EP with ASG titled Low Country. "The Take Off", originally from Taste the Sin, was remixed by RZA of Wu-Tang Clan for a Nike video series. It was available for download from Nike's website "Toe Fry" is a Buzzoven cover recorded for a tribute album that never came to fruition. It was included as a bonus track on Taste the Sin. "Iron Giant" and "Fearing Your Mind" are from a 2012 split with Dead Yet?. The latter song is a cover. "Screaming Inside Myself" and "Vultures Eye" were released together as an EP in 2014. "Seeing Visions" is an outtake from Pillars of Ash that was released on a 7" flexi disc with a 2016 issue of New Noise Magazine. "Weediquette Theme" is the theme song for the Viceland documentary television series Weediquette. An episode featuring Black Tusk's version of the song aired in May 2017. "Gallows Hill" was released in 2019 on the Graveface Records compilation Beyond Human.

== Release ==
Black Tusk released Years in Black through their Bandcamp page on November 6, 2020, as part of Bandcamp Friday. To promote the compilation, the band premiered a music video for the song "Seeing Visions". In 2021, Another Riff Raff Label manufactured copies of Years in Black on cassette tape, with a limited run of 100.

== Track listing ==
All songs were written by Black Tusk, except where noted.

Years in Black track listing
No.	Title	Length
1.	"Beneath"	4:24
2.	"Rift of Men"	4:15
3.	"Cease Fire"	2:32
4.	"Death March"	3:58
5.	"Fatal Kiss"	3:59
6.	"The Take Off" (RZA remix)	1:53
7.	"Toe Fry" (originally by Buzzoven)	2:33
8.	"Iron Giant"	4:08
9.	"Fearing Your Mind" (originally by Dead Yet?)	2:27
10.	"Screaming Inside Myself"	3:46
11.	"Vultures Eye"	4:01
12.	"Weediquette Theme"	2:02
13.	"Seeing Visions"	2:33
14.	"Gallows Hill"	3:41
Total length:		46:12

== Personnel ==
Years in Black personnel adapted from liner notes.

Black Tusk

- Andrew Fidler – guitar, vocals
- James May – drums, vocals
- Jonathan Athon – bass, vocals
- Corey Barhorst – bass, vocals
- Chris "Scary" Adams – guitar, vocals

Other personnel

- Brian Mercer – artwork
