= Dusty Roads =

Dusty Roads may refer to:

- "Dusty Roads", song by ASG from Feeling Good Is Good Enough
- "Dusty Roads", song by Irwin Chusid from Songs in the Key of Z
- "Dusty Roads", song by Downhere from Downhere
- "Dusty Roads", song by Honey Ltd. as Eve, Marsha Temmer & Laura Polkinghorne 1970
- "Dusty Roads", song by B. J. Thomas, written Chips Moman 1978
- The Dusty Roads EP, by Jinder
- Barbara "Dusty" Roads, flight attendant and labor activist (1928–2023)

== See also ==
Dusty Rhodes (disambiguation)
