= Tend No Wounds =

EP by Black Tusk
- Released: July 23, 2013
- Recorded: February 2013
- Studios: Jam Room Studio; Columbia, South Carolina
- Genres: Sludge metal; hardcore punk; stoner metal
- Length: 22:48
- Label: Relapse Records
- Producer: Phillip Cope

Black Tusk chronology
| Set the Dial (2011) | Tend No Wounds (2013) | Pillars of Ash (2016) |

Tend No Wounds is an extended play from American sludge metal band Black Tusk. It was released in 2013 by Relapse Records.

== Background ==
Tend No Wounds was recorded February 2013 at The Jam Room studio in Columbia, South Carolina, with engineers Phillip Cope and Jay Matheson. The album artwork was illustrated by Brian Mercer.

When discussing the EP, drummer James May said "This new release is a mean one. It reminds me of a new twist on an old days Black Tusk sound. We got back together with Jay and Phillip Cope to turn this out with some of that earlier, brutal sound you might have heard back in the beginning albums. We figured it was about time to see what the old gang could do years later."

Relapse Records released Tend No Wounds on CD and vinyl formats.. A week before the official release date, Punknews.org made the entire EP available for streaming on its website. Music videos were created for "In Days of Woe" and "Truth Untold", the latter of which was directed by Brad Kremer

== Reception ==
Professional ratings
Review scores
| Source | Rating |
|---|---|
| AllMusic | 3/5 stars |
| The Aquarian | Positive |
| Ave Noctum | 7.5/10 |
| Dead Rhetoric | 6.5/10 |
| Ghost Cult | 7/10 |
| Metal Injection | Mixed |
| Metal Kaoz | 8/10 |
| MetalSucks | 2/5 stars |
| PopMatters | 4/10 |
| Punknews.org | 3/5 stars |
| Sea of Tranquility | 3.5/5 stars |
| SLUG | Positive |

In a review for The Aquarian, critic Robert Gluck named “Truth Untold” as his favorite track, with particular praise for the drumming. He said, "Black Tusk are often put into the same sentence as Kylesa, Baroness and Mastodon due to the 'Savannah' sludge sound. This EP is a solid one, and will hold fans over until the band’s next full-length release." AllMusic's Gregory Heaney wrote, "Tend No Wounds finds [Black Tusk] slowing things down a bit with a midtempo sound that gives their murky riffage a little breathing room... the sound on the EP definitely feels cleaned up, removing some of the suffocating sludge of their previous efforts while still keeping things plenty heavy. The thing is, that sense of claustrophobic hostility is what made Black Tusk such a thriving and volatile band, and without it Tend No Wounds feels a bit tentative." Joe Pelone of Punknews.org said "Black Tusk sound just as brutal on new EP Tend No Wounds as they did on Passage Through Purgatory," but noted that their songs are starting to blur together. "They tend to recycle the same barked cadences. The guitars still shred nards, but the vox lose a little more power with each release." Sea of Tranquility's Carl Sederholm wrote, "With this release, Black Tusk is still awesome, but they seem comfortable, in need of a short creative recharging. Still, any Black Tusk is worth a spin and this EP is no exception."

== Track listing ==
All songs were written by Black Tusk.

Tend No Wounds track listing
| No. | Title | Length |
|---|---|---|
| 1. | "A Cold Embrace" | 1:55 |
| 2. | "Enemy of Reason" | 3:27 |
| 3. | "The Weak and the Wise" | 5:34 |
| 4. | "Internal/Eternal" | 4:51 |
| 5. | "Truth Untold" | 3:49 |
| 6. | "In Days of Woe" | 3:12 |
| Total length: | | 22:48 |

== Personnel ==
Tend No Wounds personnel adapted from liner notes.

Black Tusk

- Andrew Fidler – guitar, vocals
- James May – drums, vocals
- Jonathan Athon – bass, vocals

Other musicians

- Ricardo Ochoa – strings on "The Weak and the Wise"

Production

- Phillip Cope – producer, engineering
- Jay Matheson – engineering
- Chris Adams – additional recording on "The Weak and the Wise"
- Dave Harris – mastering
- Brian Mercer – artwork
