= Win Us Over =

Studio album by ASG
- Released: September 11, 2007
- Recorded: July 2007
- Studios: Sunset Lodge Recording; Los Angeles
- Genres: Stoner rock; stoner metal; hard rock
- Length: 46:14
- Language: English
- Label: Volcom
- Producer: Richard Woolcott

ASG chronology
Feeling Good Is Good Enough (2005)	Win Us Over (2007)	Blood Drive (2013)

Win Us Over is the fourth album by hard rock band ASG. The album was released on September 11, 2007, through Volcom Entertainment.

== Critical reception ==
Professional ratings
Review scores
Source	Rating
AllMusic	4/5 stars
Encyclopedia Metallum	9/10 stars
MetalSucks	3.5/5 stars
PopMatters	6/10
Punk Rock Theory	Positive
Scene Point Blank	4/5 stars
Sea of Tranquility	3/5 stars
Spike Magazine	Positive
Treble	3.5/5 stars
Ultimate Guitar	8.3/10

Win Us Over received generally positive reviews from contemporary music critics. Cosmo Lee, writing for AllMusic, awarded the album four stars out of five. Lee described the album as "not purely metal" and that "the band isn't afraid to rock". Further, Lee said of the music itself that "the riffs are stronger and catchier than the vast majority of stoner metal. That's because ASG write songs, not genre exercises." Eric Saeger, writing for Spike Magazine described it as larger a stoner metal album but with elements of emo, saying "negligible, yes, but it does show – comes from Taking Back Sunday, as good a choice as you’d ever get, but they’ve apparently dug The Offspring and Tool in the past and even ghouled up a few old Riot albums."

Jeff Terich in his review for Treble Magazine compared the band to the likes of Torche, saying "Torche may be the band most often slapped with the tag `doom pop,’ though they’re certainly not alone in their shared love for heavy-as-fuck riffs and catchy melodies better fit for summer fun than a night in the abyss. Wrightsville Beach, North Carolina band ASG, whose name stands for (ahem) `Amplification of Self-Gratification,’ similarly get their kicks in jackhammer guitars and maximally accessible, soaring choruses. As a fan of both sides of this ass-kicking equation, I can say this heavy metal peanut butter & chocolate mixture can almost never go wrong."

Writing for PopMatters, Mark Desrosiers, expressed some skepticism of the music, particularly apparent Christian overtones on several of the songs. Desrosiers, on the album said "there is something weird about this album. I was alerted by the opening line of the opening track: “God speaks his love through splits in tongues.” Not only is this nonsensical, it’s not very often that you get a supposedly whiskey-fueled southern-rock-sludge-psych-metal record drawing attention to a phrase like “God speaks his love”." Desrosiers went to length to say "is ASG a closet Christian metal band? I think so. Or, at the very least, Christian imagery plays a major role in their mindscape, even if they’re trying to be subversive. This isn’t necessarily a bad thing, of course, but it also might explain why Win Us Over seems a little too safe for my danger-driven (not to mention whiskey-fueled) tastes." Desrosiers awarded the album a 6 out of 10.

== Appearances in other media ==
"Dream Song" was featured in the soundtrack for the 2010 video game Splatterhouse; "The Dull Blade" was included in the Skate 2 soundtrack.

== Track listing ==
All music is composed by Jonah Citty, Andy Ellis, Scott Key, Blake Riot, and Jason Shi.

Win Us Over track listing
No.	Title	Length
1.	"Right Death Before"	3:05
2.	"Dream Song"	3:50
3.	"Low End Insight"	4:20
4.	"Glow"	3:19
5.	"Coffee Depression Sunshine"	4:12
6.	"The Dull Blade"	4:50
7.	"Ballad of Richard K."	4:00
8.	"Taking Me Over"	3:11
9.	"A Number to Murder Two"	3:32
10.	"Gallop Song"	3:32
11.	"Palm Springs"	2:43
12.	"Win Us Over"	3:26
13.	"Bombs Away"	2:15
Total length:		46:14

== Personnel ==
- Artwork – Malleus
- Bass – Andy Ellis
- Drums – Scott Key
- Executive-Producer – Richard Woolcott
- Guitar – Jonah Citty
- Mastered By – Dan Shike
- Recorded By, Mixed By, Engineer – Chris Rakestraw
- Vocals, Guitar – Jason Shi
