= Mercury Men =

Mercury Men can refer to:

- The Mercurymen, a British acoustical band
- The Mercury Men, a web series produced by the Syfy network
