= Taste the Sin =

Studio album by Black Tusk
- Released: May 25, 2010
- Recorded: January 2010
- Studios: Jam Room Studio; Columbia, South Carolina
- Genres: Sludge metal; hardcore punk; stoner metal; thrash metal
- Length: 34:08
- Label: Relapse Records
- Producer: Black Tusk

Black Tusk chronology
Passage Through Purgatory (2008)	Taste the Sin (2010)	Set the Dial (2011)

Taste the Sin is the second studio album from American sludge metal band Black Tusk, and their debut for Relapse Records. It was released on May 25, 2010.

== Background ==
Taste the Sin was recorded January 2010 at the Jam Room Studio in Columbia, South Carolina with engineers Jay Matheson and Steve Slavich. The album blends elements of sludge metal, stoner metal, thrash metal and hardcore punk, combined with shouted vocals by each of the band members. Its sound is similar to that of Kylesa and Baroness, two other bands that were involved in Savannah, Georgia's heavy music scene. The tracks "Redline", "The Take Off", "The Ride", and "The Crash" are all sub-chapters of a longer song called "Double Clutchin". The bonus track "Toe Fry" was recorded years earlier for a Buzzoven tribute album that never came to fruition.

Relapse Records released Taste the Sin on May 25, 2010. It is available on CD and vinyl formats. A music video for "Red Eyes, Black Skies" was directed by Kevin Custer. "The Take Off" was remixed by RZA of Wu-Tang Clan for the RZA Vs. Nike 6.0 video series. The remix was available for download from Nike's website and later included on the B-sides and rarities compilation album Years in Black. In 2016, Southern Druid released Taste the Sin on cassette tape.

== Reception ==
Professional ratings
Review scores
Source	Rating
AllMusic	4/5 stars
Dead Rhetoric	6/10
Exclaim!	Positive
Last Rites	Positive
Metal Reviews	73/100
Pitchfork	7.6/10
The Punk Vault	3.5/5 stars
Punknews.org	3.5/5 stars
Sputnikmusic	3/5
Treble Zine	Positive

In a review for Exclaim!, Keith Carman said "Black Tusk create a vortex of intensity and beastliness on Relapse debut Taste the Sin. Brutal, yet patient, the album is a ceaseless barrage of gruelingly abrasive riffs and scorching vocals that consistently impress and incite the listener." Grayson Currin of Pitchfork gave the album a score of 7.6 out of 10. "Churning like hardcore and viscous like stoner metal, Taste the Sin is the rare crossover record that works to capitalize on the immediacy of its chosen genres and not to bend them into obscurity." AllMusic's Gregory Heaney described their sound as "the murkiest, dirtiest sludge to come out of Savannah since Kylesa." He had high praise for the album, calling it "a condensed and incredibly satisfying listening experience." In a mixed review for Dead Rhetoric, David Gehlke wrote, "Taste the Sin borrows heavily from just about every band under the Southern doom banner... resulting in an album that fails to resonate."

== Track listing ==
All songs were written by Black Tusk.

Taste the Sin track listing
No.	Title	Length
1.	"Embrace the Madness"	3:11
2.	"Snake Charmer"	4:15
3.	"Red Eyes, Black Skies"	3:45
4.	"Way of Horse and Bow"	3:43
5.	"Unleash the Wrath"	3:38
6.	"Twist the Knife"	3:36
7.	"Redline"	2:41
8.	"The Take Off"	2:32
9.	"The Ride"	3:03
10.	"The Crash"	3:44
Total length:		34:08

Vinyl and Japanese Edition bonus track
No.	Title	Length
11.	"Toe Fry" (Buzzoven cover)	2:37

== Personnel ==
Taste the Sin personnel adapted from liner notes.

Black Tusk

- Andrew Fidler – guitar, vocals, production
- Jonathan Athon – bass, vocals, production
- James May – drums, vocals, production

Other musicians

- Jason Statts – vocals on "Unleash the Wrath"

Technical personnel

- Steve Slavich – engineering
- Jay Matheson – engineering
- Dave Harris – mastering
- Chris "Scary" Adams – recording

Art and design

- John Dyer Baizley – cover art, design
- Orion Landau – design
- Geoff L. Johnson – photography
