= Kylesa (album) =

Studio album by Kylesa
- Released: April 2, 2002
- Recorded: May/August 2001
- Studios: The Jam Room; Columbia, South Carolina
- Genre: Sludge metal
- Length: 31:59
- Label: Prank Records
- Producer: Kylesa

Kylesa chronology
| Kylesa (2002) | To Walk a Middle Course (2005) |

Singles from Kylesa
- 1. "Point of Stillness" Released: 2002

Professional ratings
Review scores
| Source | Rating |
|---|---|
| Collective Zine | Positive |

Kylesa is the debut album by American sludge metal band Kylesa. It was released on April 2, 2002, by Prank Records.

== Background ==
Kylesa formed in 2001 and began recording their debut album in May. The band played its first live show on June 2, 2001, with Mastodon and Cream Abdul Babar in Savannah, Georgia. Four days later, bassist Brian Duke died from an epileptic seizure. At the time of his death, most of the album had been finished. Kylesa returned to the studio in August, recording two songs with session bassist Michael Redmond.

== Track listing ==
| No. | Title | Length |
|---|---|---|
| 1. | "No Remorse" | 3:03 |
| 2. | "Ceaseless Becoming" | 3:02 |
| 3. | "The Scarab" | 4:37 |
| 4. | "Point of Stillness" | 4:25 |
| 5. | "Testing the Good of Man" | 5:07 |
| 6. | "Descend Within" | 4:14 |
| 7. | "Dream of the Freedom to Come" | 5:05 |
| 8. | "Parent's Song" | 2:31 |
| Total length: | | 31:59 |

== Personnel ==
Kylesa

- Phillip Cope – guitar, vocals, samples
- Laura Pleasants – guitar, vocals
- Christian Depken – drums
- Brian Duke – bass (tracks 1, 3, 4, 6, 7), vocals (1, 3, 4, 7, 8)

Other musicians

- Michael Redmond – bass (2, 5), backing vocals (5)
- Kevin Bressler – backing vocals (2, 5)
- Chris Bickel – backing vocals (3)

Technical personnel

- Jay Matheson – engineering
- Steve Slavich – engineering
- George Horn – mastering
