= Victoria Scalisi =

American singer (1964–2017)

Victoria Scalisi (1964 – August 2, 2017) was an American vocalist and artist associated with punk, sludge, and heavy metal music. She was from Savannah, Georgia.

== Musical career ==
Scalisi was best known as the vocalist for the heavy metal/punk band DAMAD. DAMAD was an underground band formed in the early 1990s. The band helped define a distinctive punk/hardcore-influenced metal style in Savannah, which had a significant impact on later bands such as Mastodon, Baroness, and Black Tusk. Members of DAMAD went on to form the bands Kylesa and Karst. Scalisi is considered one of the first women to utilize an intense guttural screaming vocal style. Around the time of her cancer diagnosis, she announced the formation of a new project called Lies in Stone.

== Artistic career ==
Scalisi's artistic talents extended beyond her vocal performances. She designed artwork and layout for DAMAD albums, including Rise and Fall and Centric. She also created the cover art for Serenity Through Pain by the band Phobia. Her contributions to visual design were an important part of her creative legacy.

== Death ==
Scalisi died of colorectal cancer on August 2, 2017, at the age of 53.
