= Jinder =

Jinder is both a surname and a given name. Notable people with the name include:

Surname:

- Åsa Jinder (born 1963), Swedish folk musician
- Little Jinder (born 1988), Swedish singer-songwriter, daughter of above

Given name:

- Jinder (musician) (born 1981), English singer/songwriter and guitarist
- Jinder Mahal (born 1986), Indo-Canadian professional wrestler
- Jinder (writer) (born 1954), Punjabi writer
