= Jinder (writer) =

Punjabi writer

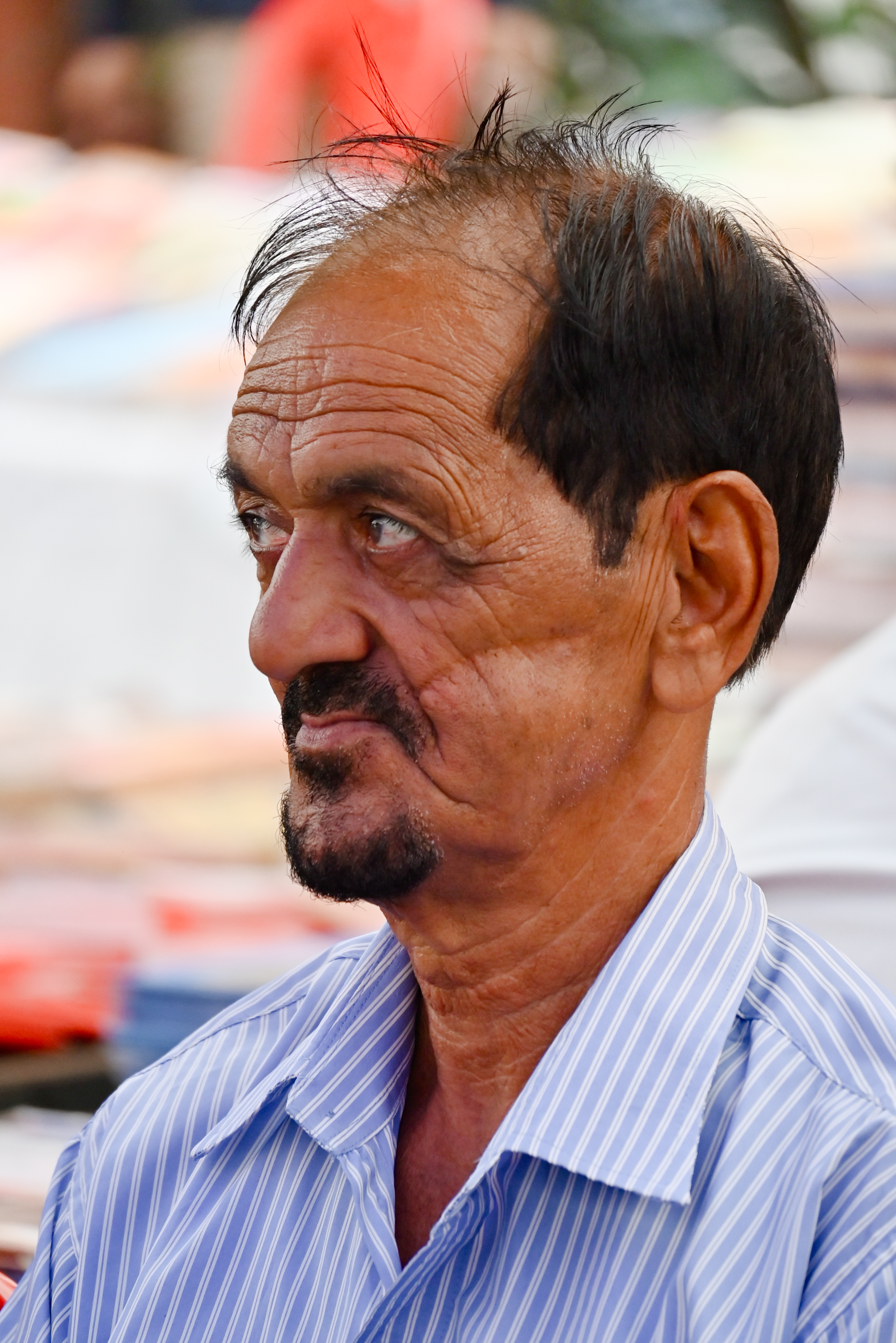
- Jinder in 2024
- Born: Harjinder Pal; February 2, 1954 (age 72) Ladhran, Punjab, India
- Occupation: Writer
- Notable works: Safety Kit
- Notable awards: Sahitya Akademi Award (2025)

Harjinder Pal (born 2 February 1954), known by his pen name Jinder, is an Indian writer. He won the Sahitya Akademi Award in 2025 for his short story collection Safety Kit. He also won CAD $25,000 at the 11th annual Dhahan Prize for the same collection.

== Biography ==
Jinder was born on 2 February 1954 in the village of Ladhran, Jalandhar, Punjab, India. He completed his Master of Arts in English literature from DAV College, Jalandhar, in 1977.

He had to struggle to find a job after completing his education. He first worked as an auction recorder in the market committee of Nakodar. He then worked as a clerk in a farm company. He then worked as a proofreader with the MBD Press, Jalandhar for four years. He then got a job at the Punjab Transport Department as an auditor, where he worked until his retirement.

He began writing in 1992 and he has written eight short story collections, two travelogues, and an autobiography. His stories are included in the syllabus of many universities and colleges in India, such as Guru Nanak Dev University (Amritsar), Punjabi University (Patiala), Maharaja Ganga Singh University (Bikaner), and other colleges. Much of his literary work has been translated into many Indian and Pakistani languages including Urdu and Sindhi.

== Awards ==
- 2024 – The Dhahan Prize for Safety Kit
- 2025 – Sahitya Akademi Award for Safety Kit
- Gurdev Singh Birha, Bhathal Kahani Award
- Translation Award of Sahitya Academy Delhi
- Harbhajan Singh Halwarvi Yadgar Award
