= Blood Drive (album) =

Studio album by ASG
- Released: May 28, 2013
- Genre: Stoner metal
- Language: English
- Label: Relapse
- Producer: Matt Hyde

ASG chronology
Win Us Over (2007)	Blood Drive (2013)	Survive Sunrise (2018)

Professional ratings
Review scores
Source	Rating
AllMusic	4/5 stars
Pitchfork	7.6/10

Blood Drive is the fifth album by stoner metal band ASG. It was produced by Matt Hyde (Slayer, Fu Manchu, Monster Magnet).The album was released on May 28, 2013.

== Track listing ==
1. "Avalanche" (4:17)
2. "Blood Drive" (3:16)
3. "Day's Work" (4:20)
4. "Scrappy's Trip" (3:37)
5. "Castlestorm" (3:55)
6. "Blues for Bama" (4:22)
7. "Earthwalk" (4:11)
8. "Children's Music" (4:41)
9. "Hawkeye" (2:42)
10. "Stargazin" (3:42)
11. The Ladder" (4:03)
12. "Good Enough To Eat (3:16)
13. "Mourning of the Earth"
