= Sierra (metal band) =

Canadian progressive metal band

Sierra was a Canadian progressive metal band formed in Kitchener-Waterloo, Ontario. Their music fuses elements of progressive rock, heavy metal, and instrumental music. Sierra have been touring since 2012, opening for bands such as Weedeater, The Obsessed, Kylesa, Unsane, and Karma to Burn.

== History ==
The band was formed by Jason Taylor and Robbie Carvalho who have been playing together since they were kids. They met after Jason posted an ad in a music store looking for young musicians into 1970s progressive rock. Jason was 15 and Robbie was 12 at the time.

Their first album, Pslip, was the first release on the Kylesa operated record label Retro Futurist Records. The album, as with all of their albums since, was recorded at The Jam Room Studios in North Carolina, by Phillip Cope of Kylesa.

The band signed to Tone Deaf Touring after the release of Pslip and have been on the road consistently since. Their first tour was across North America with Kylesa and Pinkish Black, shortly followed by a European tour with Kylesa and label mates Jagged Vision. They have since been on the road with Weedeater, 1000mods, the Obsessed and Wretch.

In 2016 they recorded the 'EP 72, a concept album based on a murder that took place in their hometown in 1972. It is written from the point of view of the 16-year-old boy who was wrongfully accused of the murder. They played the piece in its entirety at Starlight Social Club in Waterloo, steps away from where the crime scene began.

In 2017 Sierra embarked on their first headlining North American tour. Joining them was Witches of God from Los Angeles. Jason played rhythm guitar and Robbie played drums for them on that tour. The tour kicked off at the Maryland Doomfest.

Their most recent work, The Mirror, was self-released through their Bandcamp page. Steve Howe from Outlaws of the Sun wrote, "You can still feel and hear the sounds from their earlier releases but this album definitely sees Sierra playing a more confident 70s Progressive and Hard Rock sound."

== Current members ==
- Robbie Carvalho – bass, drums, vocals
- Jason Taylor - lead vocals, guitars

== Past members ==
- Ky Anto – drums
- Sam Hill – drums
- Kevin Costa – drums

== Discography ==
Albums

- Pslip (2013, Retro Futurist Records)
- The Mirror (2018, self-released)

EPs

- 1st EP (2012, self-released)
- 72 (2016, self-released)
