= Exhausting Fire =

- Album cover artwork by Shaun Beaudry

Studio album by Kylesa
- Released: October 2, 2015
- Recorded: February–March 2015
- Studios: The Jam Room; Columbia, South Carolina
- Genres: Sludge metal, heavy metal
- Length: 40:22
- Label: Season of Mist
- Producer: Philip Cope

Kylesa chronology
Ultraviolet (2013)	Exhausting Fire (2015)

Professional ratings
Aggregate scores
Source	Rating
Metacritic	82/100
Review scores
Source	Rating
About.com	4.5/5 stars
AllMusic	4/5 stars
Consequence of Sound	B
Exclaim!	8/10
Magnet	8.5/10 stars
Metal Storm	6.5/10
Pitchfork	7.4/10
Punknews.org	3.5/5 stars
Spin	8/10

Exhausting Fire is the seventh full-length studio album by American sludge metal band Kylesa. It is the group's fourth album to be released through Season of Mist.

== Reception ==
The aggregate review site Metacritic assigned an average score of 82 out of 100 to the album based on 6 reviews, indicating "universal acclaim".

== Track listing ==
Exhausting Fire track listing
No.	Title	Length
1.	"Crusher"	4:55
2.	"Inward Debate"	2:35
3.	"Moving Day"	2:46
4.	"Lost and Confused"	3:18
5.	"Shaping the Southern Sky"	5:48
6.	"Falling"	4:17
7.	"Night Drive"	4:35
8.	"Blood Moon"	4:37
9.	"Growing Roots"	4:05
10.	"Out of My Mind"	3:26
Total length:		40:22

Deluxe Edition bonus track
No.	Title	Length
11.	"Paranoid" (Black Sabbath cover)	4:40

== Personnel ==
Exhausting Fire album personnel adapted from the CD liner notes.

Kylesa

- Laura Pleasants – vocals, guitar
- Philip Cope – vocals, guitar, bass, keyboards
- Carl McGinley – drums

Other musicians

- Jay Matheson – bass on "Moving Day", "Night Drive", "Growing Roots", "Out of My Mind", Shaping the Southern Sky", "Blood Moon", "Lost and Confused", and "Paranoid" (Deluxe Edition)
- Andrew J. Ripley – oboe on "Blood Moon"

Production

- Philip Cope – producer, head engineer
- Zac Thomas – head engineer
- Steve Slavish – assistant engineer
- Jay Matheson – assistant engineer
- Carl McGinley – assistant engineer
- FatRat Da Czar – assistant engineer
- Dave Harris – mastering at Studio B, Columbia, South Carolina

Album artwork

- Shaun Beaudry – album art
- Laura Pleasants – art direction and additional graphics
- Edley O'Dowd – Kylesa "K" logo

== Charts ==
Chart	Peak position
Billboard Top Independent Albums	48
Billboard Top Hard Rock Albums	22
Billboard Top Heatseeker Albums	7
