= Static Tensions =

Studio album by Kylesa
- Released: March 17, 2009
- Recorded: July–October 2008
- Studios: The Jam Room; Columbia, South Carolina
- Genres: Sludge metal; progressive metal
- Length: 40:24
- Label: Prosthetic
- Producer: Phillip Cope

Kylesa chronology
Time Will Fuse Its Worth (2006)	Static Tensions (2009)	Spiral Shadow (2010)

Singles from Static Tensions
- 1. "Unknown Awareness" Released: January 2009

Static Tensions is the fourth studio album by the American heavy metal band Kylesa, released on March 17, 2009, by Prosthetic Records. The artwork and layout was created by John Dyer Baizley of the band Baroness. Like its predecessor, Time Will Fuse Its Worth (2006), the record features two drummers.

== Composition and music ==
Static Tensions is a sludge metal album. On the album, Kylesa features a three-singer- and two-drummer lineup, which distinguishes the band's "technically busy brand of post-progressive metal from contemporary competitors (and fellow Southerners) like Baroness and Mastodon," according to AllMusic's Eduardo Rivadiava. Rivadiava also noted the use of downtuned guitars and different singing styles such as shouting, crooning or croaked singing styles, along with elements from stoner rock, sludge rock, psych-rock and alternative rock. Pitchfork critic Cosmo Lee characterized the track "Scapegoat" as "a hardcore punk two-step" and added: "But despite this newfound efficiency, the songs are more baroque than ever. They flaunt melodies shamelessly now. Choruses are insistent. Practically the whole record is hummable." Lee also noted that "the track 'Running Red' alternates Slayer harmonies with riffs redolent of Black Sabbath's 'Iron Man'" while Laura Pleasants' singing, once a buried gem, is often upfront." Spin critic David Marchese thought that the band's guitarists "summon amorphous detuned riffs covered in reverb that suddenly snap into distorted single-note flurries. Throughout, drummers Carl McGinley and Eric Hernandez play tight, tribal beats."

== Critical reception ==
Professional ratings
Aggregate scores
Source	Rating
Metacritic	79/100
Review scores
Source	Rating
AllMusic	3.5/5 stars
Alternative Press	4/5 stars
The Austin Chronicle	3/4 stars
Pitchfork	8.2/10
Tiny Mix Tapes	4/5 stars

Upon its release, Static Tensions generally received positive reviews from music critics. At Metacritic, which assigns a normalized rating out of 100 to reviews from critics, the album received an average score of 79, which indicates "generally favorable reviews", based on eight reviews.

AllMusic critic Eduardo Rivadiava wrote: "At the end of the day, the best single word for describing Static Tensions is 'unpredictable,' and although this characteristic may demand a few more listens before the album's many amazing qualities can sink in properly, the ultimate payoff is very much worth the effort."

Jesse Raub of Alternative Press stated: "Though some might fear the band have lost their edge, their latest album is more focused and, like a laser beam, ultimately more destructive when concentrated." Raub further commented: "Although a more varied use of the two drummers would be appreciated, the overall echoed effect with the cleaner production offers a complete, homogenized sound, which, when consumed en masse, makes for a killer album."

The Austin Chronicle's Raoul Hernandez thought: "While not as compositionally right-angled as 2006 Prosthetic disc Time Will Fuse Its Worth, liquefies massively ("Perception") and even psychedelically ("Unknown Awareness") into a multiton Teutonic corkscrew ("Only One")."

Pitchfork critic Cosmo Lee wrote: "The band has etched light, dark, sky, and earth so deftly onto wax that it vibrates the very soul." David Marchese of Spin commented: "The heat subsides at times, but it never breaks." Tiny Mix Tapes' Bryan Reed wrote: "This is a dynamic, densely-packaged slab of rock 'n' roll, which not only stands alongside the titans of the genre, but gives Kylesa a name of their own."

== Track listing ==
All songs written by Phillip Cope, Carl McGinley and Laura Pleasants, except where noted.

No.	Title	Length
1.	"Scapegoat"	3:25
2.	"Insomnia for Months" (Eric Hernandez)	2:04
3.	"Said and Done"	4:09
4.	"Unknown Awareness"	4:22
5.	"Running Red"	5:46
6.	"Nature's Predators"	4:10
7.	"Almost Lost"	3:03
8.	"Only One"	5:20
9.	"Perception"	3:43
10.	"To Walk Alone"	4:22

== Personnel ==
Kylesa

- Phillip Cope – guitar, vocals, samples
- Laura Pleasants – guitar, vocals
- Carl McGinely – drums, piano
- Eric Hernandez – drums (bass, guitar, drums on track 2)
- Javier Villegas – bass

Production

- Phillip Cope – producer, assistant engineering
- Jay Matheson – engineering
- Steve Slavich – engineering
- Carl McGInley – assistant engineering
- Zac Thomas – assistant engineering
- Dave Harris – mastering
- John Dyer Baizley – artwork, layout
