= Dusty Rhodes (disambiguation) =

Dusty Rhodes (1945–2015) was an American professional wrestler

Dusty Rhodes may also refer to:

== Sports ==
- Dusty Rhodes (footballer) (1882–1960), English association football player
- Dusty Rhodes (cricketer) (1916–1983), English cricketer and umpire
- Dusty Rhodes (outfielder) (1927–2009), Major League Baseball player
- Dusty Rhodes (pitcher), Negro leagues baseball player
- Dusty Rhodes (baseball coach) (born 1946), former head coach of the North Florida Ospreys baseball team
- Dusty Rhodes Tag Team Classic, a yearly tournament created in 2015 named after the wrestler

== Music ==
- Dusty Rhodes, album by John Holt
- "Dusty Rhodes", a song by Lotus Plaza from the album Spooky Action at a Distance
- Dusty Rhodes (fl. 1960s), country music producer on Willis Alan Ramsey
- Dusty Rhodes and the River Band, an indie rock group from Anaheim, California
- Robert Fripp (born 1946), guitarist who used the pseudonym "Dusty Rhodes"

== Other ==
- Thomas L. Rhodes (1939–2018), nicknamed Dusty, American political editor and president of National Review
- Raleigh Rhodes (1918–2007), nicknamed Dusty, American World War II fighter pilot
- Cornelius P. Rhoads (1898-1959), nicknamed Dusty, American pathologist, oncologist, first director of Memorial Sloan Kettering Cancer Center
- Dusty Rhodes, radio presenter/DJ on various Irish radio stations, including Atlantic 252 and RTÉ 2fm

== See also ==
- Bob Rhoads (1879–1967), Major League Baseball pitcher nicknamed "Dusty"
- Dustin Rhodes (born 1969), known professionally as Goldust, Dustin Runnels or Dusty Rhodes Jr., son of professional wrestler
- Dusty Roads (disambiguation)
