= Mira (band) =

American band

- Origin: Tallahassee, Florida, U.S.
- Genres: Dream pop, shoegaze, indie pop, ethereal wave
- Years active: 1996–2006
- Labels: Tesseract, Projekt Records
- Past members: Regina Sosinski; Alan Donaldson; Tom Parker; Sam Riles; Max Fresen; Jeff Engel; Mark Davidson; Melody Fleck
- Website: http://www.mira.nu

Mira were an American five-piece dream pop/shoegaze band from Tallahassee, Florida, United States, formed in 1996.

== History ==
Mira was formed by vocalist Regina Sosinski, guitarist Tom Parker, bassist Sam Riles and drummer Alan Donaldson. Originally called Still, they were influenced by shoegaze bands such as Slowdive and Cocteau Twins.

After releasing several EPs on their own Tesseract label, the band signed to Projekt Records, and their song "Cayman" appeared on Projekt's cat-themed 1999 compilation A Cat-Shaped Hole in My Heart.

Max Fresen replaced Riles, and the band briefly added guitarist Jeff Engel. Mark Davidson would replace Engel. Then Fresen left to be replaced by Melody Fleck.

Mira released their eponymous debut studio album on April 4, 2000.

For second album Apart, Melody Fleck replaced Fresen on bass, and the band toured the US.

In 2002, they collaborated on a self-released split single with Cream Abdul Babar, covering each other's songs.

Following 2005's There I Go Daydreamer, the band ceased activity and members moved on to other musical projects.

In 2011, Projekt released a compilation of rare and early Mira recordings, titled The Echo Lingers On (Demos, Outtakes and Rehearsals).

== Other projects ==
Sosinski later formed Warm Orange with Paul Burdack.

Donaldson formed Florida shoegaze band Fantome, later succeeded by Book of the Chow Chow. He also played in Kid Hart.

Davidson played in Welcome to Nagaland and Done Beginner.

== Discography ==
=== Studio albums ===
- Mira (2000, Projekt)
- Apart (2001, Projekt)
- There I Go Daydreamer (2005, Projekt)

=== Singles and EPs ===
- Something Ventured EP (1997, Tesseract)
- Dry EP (1998, Tesseract)
- Cowhausexclusive EP (1999, Tesseract)
- The Space split 7-inch with Cream Abdul Babar (2002, self-released)
- Pieces EP (2005, Projekt)

=== Compilation albums ===
- The Echo Lingers On (Demos, Outtakes and Rehearsals) (2011, Projekt)

=== Compilation appearances ===
- "Cayman" on A Cat-Shaped Hole in My Heart (1999, Projekt)
- "Divine" on Seireenia (2000, Projekt)
