= Passage Through Purgatory =

Studio album by Black Tusk
- Released: February 5, 2008
- Studios: Jam Room Studio; Columbia, South Carolina
- Genres: Sludge metal; hardcore punk; stoner metal
- Length: 25:01
- Labels: Hyperrealist Records; Relapse Records (reissue)
- Producer: Phillip Cope

Black Tusk chronology
The Fallen Kingdom (2007)	Passage Through Purgatory (2008)	Taste the Sin (2010)

Passage Through Purgatory is the first studio album from American sludge metal band Black Tusk. The album was originally released in 2008 by Hyperrealist Records. A remastered expanded edition was issued in 2011 by Relapse Records.

== Background ==
Passage Through Purgatory was recorded at the Jam Room Studio in Columbia, South Carolina and engineered by Jay Matheson, Steve Slavich and Phillip Cope. The album blends sludge metal, stoner metal, and hardcore punk, combined with shouted vocals by each of the three band members. Its sound has drawn comparisons to fellow Savannah bands Kylesa and Baroness, as well as High on Fire and Corrosion of Conformity.

The album was released on CD and vinyl by Hyperrealist Records. The original CD release included an extra song and a bonus DVD of music videos, a live set, and a photo gallery. In 2011, Relapse Records released a remastered edition of the album which included two bonus tracks. The extra songs, “Beneath” and “Fatal Kiss”, were previously released in 2009 on split 7" singles with The Holy Mountain and Fight Amp. Both tracks were later included on the B-sides and rarities compilation album Years in Black.

Music videos were created for "Fixed in the Ice" and "Mind Moves Something", which were directed by Alixandra Petrovich and Jay Reiter, respectively.

== Reception ==
Professional ratings
Review scores
Source	Rating
Exclaim!	Positive
V13 Media	Positive

In a review for V13 Media Group, Bruce Moore described Passage Through Purgatory as "slow burning, super gloomy, and heavy as hell; a lethal mix of heavy guitars and growling vocals." He praised the band for "their ability to take something so heavy and so raw and make it almost catchy," stating, "As gloomy and sludgy as it gets... the disc includes quite a few terrifically infectious grooves." Mike Simpson gave the album a positive review for Exclaim!, saying, "Thanks to hefty co-signs via the now instantly recognizable artwork of Baroness's John Baizley, as well as the crusty but thorough production of Kylesa's Phillip Cope, this band have received the full-on Southern sludge treatment... Passage Through Purgatory is a gritty combo of the aforementioned stalwarts' riff-driven, groove-based greatness alongside crossover-era C.O.C. thrash vitriol and some of the crawling chaos of High on Fire. The simplicity of Tusk's formula is enticing, even demonstrating a touch of classic metal abandon sadly absent in their big brother bands' output."

== Track listing ==
All songs were written by Black Tusk.

Passage Through Purgatory track listing
No.	Title	Length
1.	"Witch's Spell"	0:57
2.	"Fixed in the Ice"	2:54
3.	"Mind Moves Something"	2:55
4.	"Interlude"	1:25
5.	"End of Days"	3:49
6.	"Prophecy One By One"	3:24
7.	"Falling Down"	3:15
8.	"Breaking the Backs of Men"	3:28
9.	"Call of the Sewer Rat"	2:52
Total length:		25:01

Hyperrealist CD bonus track
No.	Title	Length
10.	Untitled (hidden remix of "Facedriver")	2:48

Relapse bonus tracks
No.	Title	Length
10.	"Beneath"	4:20
11.	"Fatal Kiss"	3:55

== Personnel ==
Passage Through Purgatory personnel adapted from liner notes.

Black Tusk

- Andrew Fidler – guitar, vocals
- Jonathan Athon – bass, vocals
- James May – drums, vocals

Production

- Phillip Cope – producer, engineering, vocals on "Fixed in the Ice"
- Jay Matheson – engineering
- Steve Slavich – engineering
- Scott Hull – mastering
- Zach Thomas – engineering (Relapse bonus tracks)
- Dave Harris – mastering (Relapse bonus tracks)
- John Dyer Baizley – cover art, design
