= Set the Dial =

Studio album by Black Tusk
- Released: October 25, 2011
- Recorded: June 2011
- Studios: Soundhouse Studios; Seattle, Washington
- Genres: Sludge metal; hardcore punk; stoner metal
- Length: 34:01
- Label: Relapse Records
- Producer: Jack Endino

Black Tusk chronology
Taste the Sin (2010)	Set the Dial (2011)	Tend No Wounds (2013)

Set the Dial is the third studio album from American sludge metal band Black Tusk. The album was released in 2011 by Relapse Records.

== Background ==
Set the Dial was recorded at Soundhouse Studios in Seattle, Washington with producer Jack Endino. The album blends elements of sludge metal, doom metal, and hardcore punk, with shouted vocals by all three band members. When asked how the album differs from their previous releases, drummer James May said, "It's a little less thrashy, a little slower and a little heavier... We would describe this one as more of a heavy rock album." Ahead of the Set the Dial's release, the band shared a demo recording of the song "Ender of All". It was later included on the Deluxe Edition of the album, along with three live tracks that were recorded in 2004.

== Reception ==
Professional ratings
Review scores
Source	Rating
Dead Rhetoric	7.5/10
Exclaim!	Positive
The Heavy Chronicles	4/5 stars
Metal Injection	7/10
Metal Kaoz	7/10
Metalitalia.com	7.0/10
MetalReviews.com	80/100
Punknews.org	3.5/5 stars
Sea of Tranquility	3.5/5 stars
The Sleeping Shaman	Positive
SonicAbuse	Positive
Stereogum	Positive
Trebuchet Magazine	8/10

Stereogum named Set the Dial its "Album of the Week". In a review for The Sleeping Shaman, Mark Hunt-Bryden praised Black Tusk's "raw enthusiasm", saying "the album is a joy from start to finish." Phil of SonicAbuse called Set the Dial "arguably a flawless album, a shining gem in Black Tusk’s swamp-muck encrusted crow..." He complimented its "searing riffs, intelligent lyrics and memorable tunes", asserting that "Black Tusk may well have just unleashed a genre benchmark." Metal Injection gave the album a 7 out of 10 and said, "No one will ever mistake Set the Dial for a forward-thinking masterpiece, but in a market that is arguably the most glutted in all of American heavy metal (sludge/doom) it certainly doesn't hurt to have an alternative." Punknews.org's Joe Pelone said the album "generally still finds Black Tusk sticking to its strengths. These tunes are sludgy rockers with throaty vocals and punishing rhythms. It's straightforward and fun all the way."

== Track listing ==
All songs were written by Black Tusk.

Set the Dial track listing
No.	Title	Length
1.	"Brewing the Storm"	1:56
2.	"Bring Me Darkness"	3:05
3.	"Ender of All"	4:40
4.	"Mass Devotion"	2:39
5.	"Carved in Stone"	3:36
6.	"Set the Dial to Your Doom"	2:58
7.	"Resistor"	4:27
8.	"This Time Is Divine"	2:56
9.	"Growing Horns"	3:27
10.	"Crossroads and Thunder"	4:21
Total length:		34:01

Deluxe Edition bonus tracks
No.	Title	Length
11.	"Full Circle" (live)	3:21
12.	"Facedriver" (live)	2:04
13.	"Confined to Struggle" (live)	4:17
14.	"Ender of All" (demo)	4:40

== Personnel ==
Set the Dial personnel adapted from liner notes.

Black Tusk

- Andrew Fidler – guitar, vocals
- Jonathan Athon – bass, vocals
- James May – drums, vocals

Production

- Jack Endino – producer, engineering
- Alan Douches – mastering
- John Dyer Baizley – cover art
- Orion Landau – design
