= ASG (band) =

American rock band

- ASG in Barcelona in June 2015. Left to right: Jonah Citty, Scott Key, Jason Shi and Andy Ellis

Background information
- Origin: Wilmington, North Carolina, U.S.
- Genres: Stoner rock, stoner metal, alternative metal
- Years active: 2001–present
- Labels: Relapse Records, Volcom
- Members: Jason Shi; Andy Ellis; Scott Key; Jonah Citty

ASG is an American stoner rock/metal band signed to Relapse Records, originating from Wilmington, North Carolina. It is a four-piece band, with Jason Shi on vocals and guitar, Andy Ellis on bass, Scott Key on drums and Jonah Citty on guitar. The band has acquired an underground following, as a number of its songs have been featured in skateboarding, surfing, and snowboarding videos.

== History ==
ASG started with the name All Systems Go in 2001, but shortened to the acronym ASG after a brief copyright issue with another band of the same name. Through the years the band has claimed in jest that 'ASG' has several alternate meanings, including "amplification of self gratification", "all systems gone", "anarchist school for girls" among others.

ASG recorded and self released their debut album/demo in 2002 (later released by Volcom in 2005). Soon after in 2003 they signed with Volcom Entertainment. In 2003, they released their first full-length with Volcom, The Amplification of Self-Gratification, and immediately began a tour to promote it, playing portions of the 2003 and 2004 Vans Warped Tour.

After the '04 Vans Warped Tour, ASG went to Los Angeles to record their second Volcom release, Feeling Good Is Good Enough, produced by Matt Hyde. Shortly after completing Feeling Good Is Good Enough, second guitarist Jonah Citty (formerly of the band Ergot) was added to help recreate the album's sounds live. John Staton of Star-News called the album one of the ten best of 2005.

In 2008, ASG released their fourth album, Win Us Over, which was again produced by Matt Hyde and features vocal guest, Blag Dahlia, on the track "Palm Springs". In June 2009, ASG released a split EP with Black Tusk, Low Country, that was recorded live at the Jam Room in Columbia, SC and was produced by Phillip Cope of Kylesa. The artwork for "Low Country" was done by John Dyer Baizley from Baroness.

In 2009, ASG released a split CD with Savannah, Georgia band Black Tusk. It was recorded by Phillip Cope of Kylesa at the Jam Room in Columbia S.C. John Baizley of Baroness did the album's artwork. This split was self released by ASG and also by the Hyperrealist record label. In 2010, ASG released a split 7' vinyl with West Virginia's Karma to Burn as part of Volcom Entertainment's vinyl club series. ASG included the song 'All Over Creation' and Karma to Burn included 'Twenty in TwentyTen.'

In late 2011, ASG signed with Relapse Records out of Philadelphia. According to the band's Facebook page, they entered the studio to record their Relapse debut, Blood Drive, with producer Matt Hyde in August 2012. It was released on May 28, 2013, soon followed by videos for "Day's Work" and "Scrappy's Trip" (premiered by VEVO and Stereogum respectively).

== Overview ==
The band plays a mixture of punk, southern rock, stoner metal and alternative metal. Tracks from the band's albums have been played on MTV shows, including Viva La Bam, Rob & Big, Living Lahaina, Homewrecker, Bam's Unholy Union, Road Rules/Real World Challenge and Remaking Vince Neil, and as background music in numerous surfing and snowboarding videos. Their song "The Dull Blade" from the album Win Us Over was included in the soundtrack of the skateboarding video game Skate 2, and "Dream Song" (also from Win Us Over) was included in the soundtrack for the 2010 video game Splatterhouse.

ASG has toured with bands such as Motörhead, Weedeater, The Dwarves, Saviours, Helmet, Graveyard, Orange Goblin, High on Fire, and Torche. ASG played the 2007 Volcom Tour with Valient Thorr and Riverboat Gamblers. In September 2008, the band was part of that year's Volcom Tour along with Motörhead, Valient Thorr and Year Long Disaster. They were replacing both The Misfits and Airbourne who had pulled out of the tour. In 2009, ASG opened for CKY on their summer tour alongside Sweden's Graveyard.

Vocalist-guitarist Jason Shi is the main songwriter for the band. ASG has credited influences such as Queens of the Stone Age, Jane's Addiction, Torche, Zeke, and Ween. In a review of the album Win Us Over, AllMusic wrote that the band's sound combines "the best qualities of Kyuss and Queens of the Stone Age".

== Band members ==
- Jason Shi – vocals, guitars
- Jonah Citty – guitars
- Andy Ellis – bass
- Scott Key – drums
- Blake Riot – guitars

== Discography ==
- ASG (2002)
- The Amplification of Self-Gratification (2003)
- Feeling Good Is Good Enough (2005)
- Win Us Over (2007)
- Low Country (split with Black Tusk) (2009)
- Blood Drive (2013)
- Survive Sunrise (2018)
- Pyramid Wheels (EP) (2022)
