= To Walk a Middle Course =

Studio album by Kylesa
- Released: March 22, 2005
- Recorded: October 2004
- Studios: Hot Head Recording; Los Angeles, CA
- Genres: Sludge metal; alternative metal; stoner rock
- Length: 40:05
- Label: Prosthetic
- Producer: Alex Newport

Kylesa chronology
Kylesa (2002)	To Walk a Middle Course (2005)	Time Will Fuse Its Worth (2006)

To Walk a Middle Course is the second studio album by American heavy metal band Kylesa. Released on March 22, 2005, by Prosthetic Records, it was produced by English record producer Alex Newport, who is known for his projects Fudge Tunnel and Nailbomb.

== Music and composition ==
To Walk a Middle Course incorporates elements of sludge metal, alternative metal and stoner rock. The album features a variety of metal and non-metal influences, including doom metal, stoner rock, punk rock, and gothic rock. AllMusic critic Alex Henderson wrote, "Elements of Neurosis, Eyehategod, Orange Goblin, and Black Sabbath assert themselves, as do elements of the Melvins, Lydia Lunch, and X. Kylesa often employ the punky male vocals/punky female vocals contrast that worked so well for X in the '80s, although they're a much heavier band." Blabbermouth.net's Keith Bergman stated that the band "are all about throwing murky riffs, bottom-of-a-well screams, and lugubrious rhythms into a dour punk stew that name-checks everyone from old Neurosis to Amebix to Eyehategod to Unsane. Exclaim! critic Jill Mikkelson thought that the record has "prolonged, tension-building moments that sound similar to Keelhaul, mid-tempo riffing reminiscent of Mastodon and more emotionally driven, rock-chord progressions that add dynamic to the mud."

== Critical reception ==
Professional ratings
Review scores
Source	Rating
AllMusic	3/5 stars
Aversionline	Positive
Blabbermouth.net	6/10
The Daily Vault	B–
Exclaim!	Mixed

The album generally received mixed-to-positive reviews from music critics. AllMusic's Alex Henderson wrote: "Kylesa can be very dissonant, noisy, and discordant, but they aren't that way all the time; moments of sensory assault can easily be followed by passages that are moody, eerie, and darkly atmospheric." Henderson further stated that the record "isn't as consistent as it could have been, but more often than not, Kylesa's risk-taking pays off on this intriguing, if uneven, effort." Keith Bergman of Blabbermouth.net commented: "After a few tracks, Kylesa's zanily unpredictable mishmash of sound becomes… well… predictable. You'll get the idea after ten minutes — this sort of dirty, dreadlocked psychedelia blown out of the basement of an abandoned punk squat, hoarsely shouted, with riffs that sound apocalyptic in a blown-tube-amp kind of way." Exclaim! critic Jill Mikkelson wrote: "Though most of the lacklustre melodies are easily forgotten, they do experiment in bending the confines of their genre. Duelling male and female vocals give the songs a memorable quality that distinguishes it from the typical whiskey throat grunt-singing of the other stoners." She concluded by saying, "This record will appeal to fans of stoner rock but isn't anything special." In a review for The Daily Vault, Christopher Thelen called To Walk a Middle Course "a worthwhile, though challenging, listen." He gave the album a B– rating, saying, "They show some incredible power within these ten tracks, even if it sometimes seems like they’re still one step away from true musical domination. Andrew of Aversionline said the album "is easily Kylesa's finest material to date, and they're creeping extremely close to the next level of sheer force and impact. They've yet to complete rip my head off, but there are some killer tunes here, and I'm absolutely looking forward to their future efforts."

== Track listing ==
No.	Title	Length
1.	"In Memory"	4:29
2.	"Fractured"	2:43
3.	"Train of Thought"	3:29
4.	"Motion and Presence"	4:26
5.	"Welcome Mat to an Abandoned Life"	3:38
6.	"Bottom Line"	2:48
7.	"Eyes Closed from Birth"	3:56
8.	"Shatter the Clock"	4:46
9.	"Phantoms"	6:15
10.	"Crashing Slow"	3:35

== Personnel ==
Kylesa

- Phillip Cope – guitar, sampling, vocals
- Laura Pleasants – guitar, vocals
- Corey Barhorst – bass, sampling, vocals
- Brandon Baltzley – drums

Production

- Alex Newport – audio engineer, production
- Louie Teran – mastering
- Drew Speziale – cover art
