= Time Will Fuse Its Worth =

Studio album by Kylesa
- Released: October 30, 2006
- Recorded: June 2006
- Studios: The Jam Room; Columbia, South Carolina
- Genre: Sludge metal
- Length: 39:26
- Label: Prosthetic
- Producer: Phillip Cope

Kylesa chronology
To Walk a Middle Course (2005)	Time Will Fuse Its Worth (2006)	Static Tensions (2009)

Time Will Fuse Its Worth is the third full-length album by American sludge metal band Kylesa. It was released October 30, 2006 by Prosthetic Records.

== Critical reception ==
Professional ratings
Review scores
Source	Rating
AllMusic	4/5 stars
The Austin Chronicle	3/5 stars
Metal Injection	7.5/10 stars
Rock Hard	7.5/10 stars
Scene Point Blank	7/10 stars

Critical reception for Time Will Fuse Its Worth was positive, with reviews rating it as significantly improved and more composed than previous albums. AllMusic approved of its "admirable experimental streak [...] in the near-psychedelic interludes" while Exclaim! approved of the melding of different influences with an array of vocals. Reviews were indifferent regarding the benefits of the new dual-drummer set-up, with reviewers noting that it rarely added anything extra to the songs.

== Track listing ==
No.	Title	Length
1.	"Intro"	0:34
2.	"What Becomes an End"	4:02
3.	"Hollow Severer"	4:12
4.	"Where the Horizon Unfolds"	4:53
5.	"Between Silence and Sound"	6:18
6.	"Intermission"	2:01
7.	"Identity Defined"	3:20
8.	"Ignoring Anger"	5:17
9.	"The Warning"	6:26
10.	"Outro"	2:23

== Personnel ==
Kylesa

- Phillip Cope – vocals, guitar, keyboards
- Laura Pleasants – guitar, vocals
- Corey Barhorst – bass, vocals, keyboards
- Carl McGinley – drums
- Jeff Porter – drums

Production

- Phillip Cope – producer, engineering
- Jay Matheson – engineering
- Steve Slavich – engineering
- Carl McGInley – assistant engineering
- Bobby Scandissio – "additional musicianship" (track 6), custom effects
- Scott Hull – mastering
