= Black Tusk (band) =

American sludge metal band

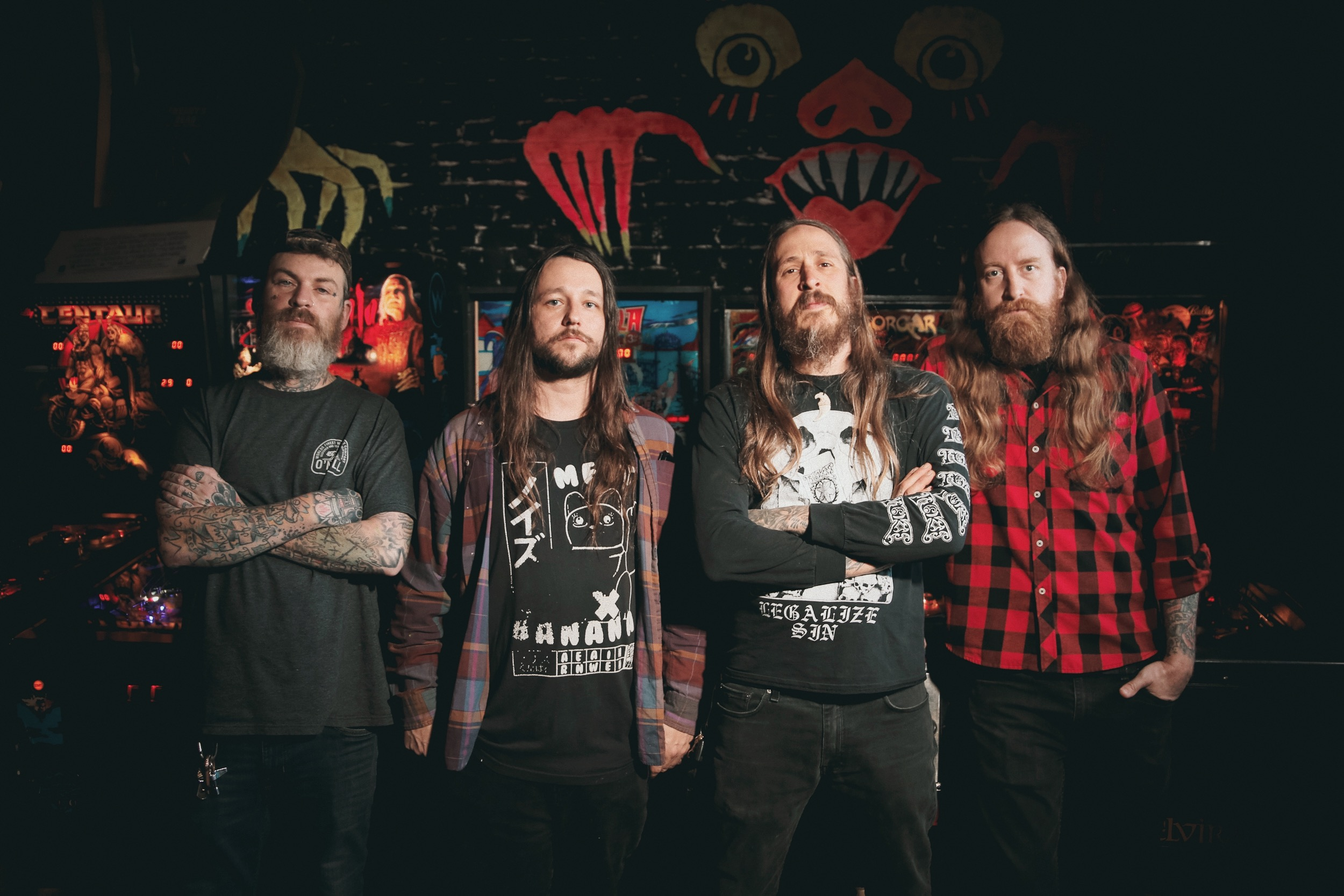
- Black Tusk in 2024

Background information
- Origin: Savannah, Georgia, U.S.
- Genres: Sludge metal; hardcore punk; stoner metal
- Years active: 2004–present
- Labels: Season of Mist; Relapse; Brutal Panda; No Idea; Hyperrealist; Wrecked Signal
- Members: Andrew Fidler; James May; Chris "Scary" Adams; Derek Lynch
- Past members: Jonathan Athon; Corey Barhorst
- Website: blacktuskband.com

Black Tusk is an American heavy metal band from Savannah, Georgia. Active since 2004, the band is closely associated with Kylesa and Baroness for their shared hometown and sludge metal sound.

== History ==
Black Tusk began in late 2004 and early 2005, when its members were all living on the same street in Savannah. Guitarist Andrew Fidler previously played bass in Unpersons and later became a part-owner of independent label Hyperrealist Records. Fidler and bassist Jonathan Athon were in a crust punk band called HammÜrd Shit, while drummer James May was in a street punk band named The Bricks. After the dissolution of both groups, Fidler and Athon went down the street to May's house and asked him if he wanted to play music with them. They jammed during the next few days and began touring together within a few months. In January 2005, Black Tusk recorded their debut extended play, When Kingdoms Fall, which was released by Wrecked Signal Records. It was produced by Phillip Cope, who would work on many of their early recording sessions.

After distributing an untitled demo in 2006 and touring with Baroness, the band self-released another EP, The Fallen Kingdom, in 2007. Their debut studio album, Passage Through Purgatory, was released the following year through Hyperrealist. In 2009, Black Tusk released a series of split EPs with bands such as ASG, The Holy Mountain, and Fight Amp, before signing to Relapse Records in November. The band's debut for Relapse, Taste the Sin, was released in May 2010. A song from the album, "The Take Off", was remixed by RZA of Wu-Tang Clan for the RZA Vs. Nike 6.0 video series. The remix was available for download from Nike's website. In 2011, Relapse re-issued a remastered edition of Passage Through Purgatory and released Black Tusk's third full-length album, Set the Dial. The Fallen Kingdom was also issued on vinyl by Hyperrealist. Over the next few years, the band released a split 7" with Savannah punk band Dead Yet? (through Hyperrealist), an EP titled Tend No Wounds (via Relapse), and a 7" titled Vulture's Eye (Hyperrealist).

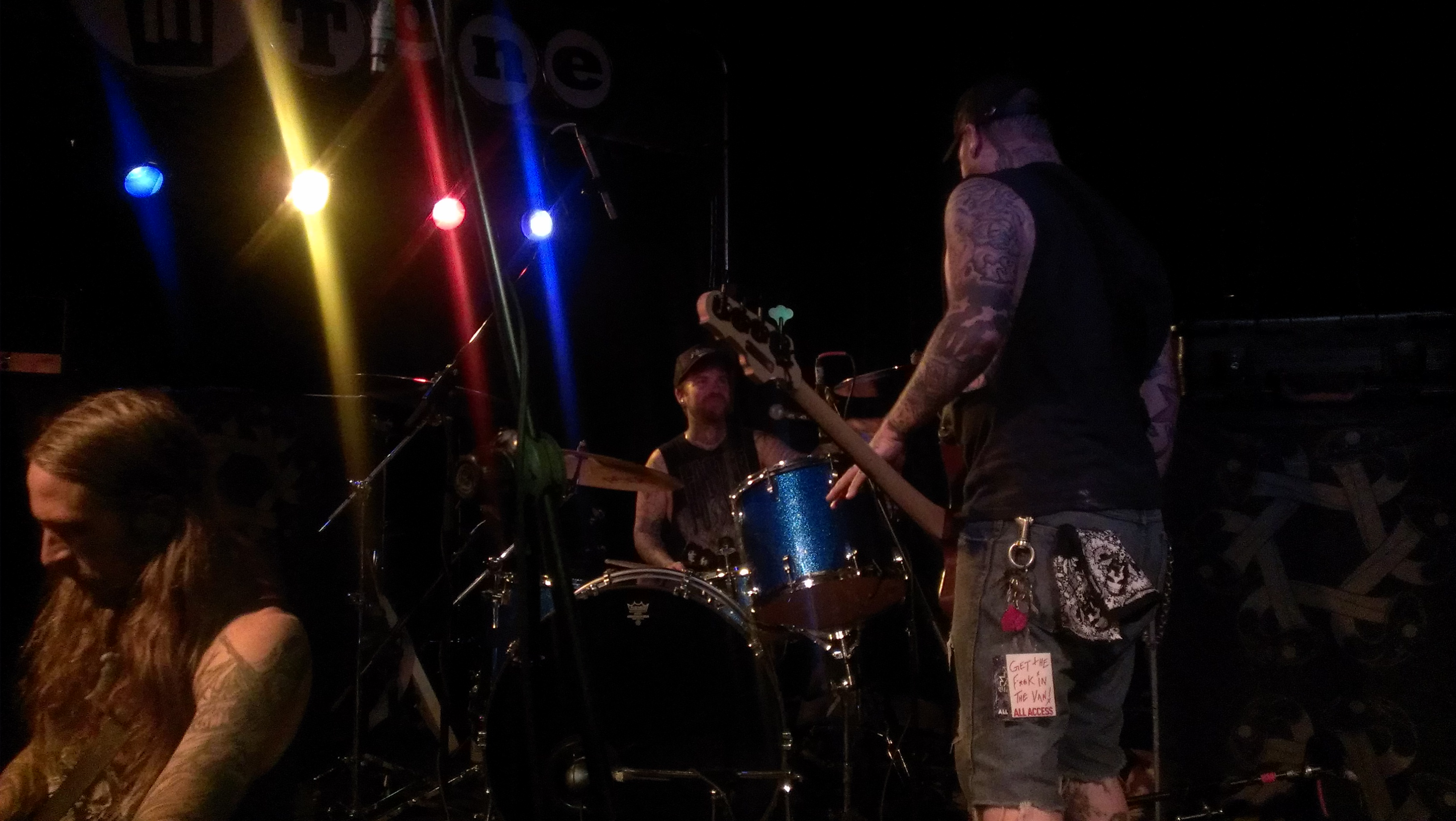
Black Tusk performing in 2012

On November 9, 2014, band member Jonathan Athon died due to injuries sustained from a motorcycle accident. He was placed in a medically induced coma and, per his wishes, was pulled from life support after it was determined that he had irreparable brain damage. On December 10, 2014, Black Tusk announced a 2015 European tour with Black Label Society, and that Corey Barhorst (formerly of Kylesa) would fill in on bass duties. The band also confirmed that they had finished recording their next album before Athon's death. In November 2015, Black Tusk shared "God's On Vacation" from their upcoming album. The song was later featured in the launch trailer for Mortal Kombat XL. Black Tusk's fourth studio album, Pillars of Ash, was released in January 2016 via Relapse. In support of the album, the band toured with Royal Thunder, Holy Grail, and Bask. “Seeing Visions”, a leftover track from the Pillars of Ash recording sessions, was released with issue #24 of New Noise Magazine as part of their flexi disc series.

Black Tusk recorded a theme song for an episode of the Viceland documentary television series Weediquette, which aired in May 2017. In March 2018, it was reported that the band signed to Season of Mist and was recording a new album, which would be the first to feature bassist Corey Barhorst. The album, T.C.B.T., was released in August 2018 and supported by tours with Cloak and Child Bite. In October 2019, the band shared a new song called "Gallows Hill". Released on the Graveface Records compilation Beyond Human, it was the first song written with longtime collaborator Chris "Scary" Adams, who had joined Black Tusk as a second guitarist. The track was later included on the compilation album Years in Black, which was released in November 2020. Corey Barhorst left the band during the COVID-19 pandemic and was replaced by bassist Derek Lynch. Around this time, Black Tusk collaborated with Child Bite on cover versions of Prong's "Snap Your Fingers, Snap Your Neck" and Butthole Surfers' "Who Was in My Room Last Night?" The latter features vocals from actor Bill Moseley, who appears in the music video.

In February 2024, Black Tusk announced their sixth studio album, The Way Forward, which was released in April via Season of Mist. It is their first album to feature Chris Adams and Derek Lynch as official members of the band. Adams contributed guitar and vocals, and also recorded, mixed, and produced the album at his studio, Hidden Audio. In 2025, Black Tusk contributed to the Nine Inch Nails tribute album The Downward Spiral Redux, with a cover version of "Mr. Self Destruct". Longtime collaborator and touring musician Tanner Hamilton played drums on the track. Black Tusk released a new EP, Systems of Solitude, in June 2026. In July, the band canceled their remaining 2026 tour dates due to "health issues and personal matters," but announced plans to return to the studio to work on a new record.

== Musical style ==
Black Tusk's members refer to their music as "swamp metal", a style that AllMusic described as "the murkiest, dirtiest sludge to come out of Savannah since Kylesa". The term is a reference to the climate of Savannah in relation to the music that the band creates. Pitchfork Media said that the band's blend of hardcore punk and stoner metal "works to capitalize on the immediacy of its chosen genres and not to bend them into obscurity." Revolver called their output "insistent, immediate music that, despite its frequently rapid tempos and punk-ish vocals, was widely referred to as 'swamp metal' due to its muddy distortion and repetitive riffs." Black Tusk acknowledges its punk rock origins, but prefer not to cite a list of bands that influence them because they are not "trying to emulate any one band's style or any one genre's sound."

== Visual artwork ==
Baroness frontman John Baizley has created much of Black Tusk's artwork. He and the band developed "Agatha", a recurring female figure who is often featured on their album covers. When asked about the character, drummer James May cited Iron Maiden mascot Eddie as an inspiration. "We wanted to have a character that you would instantly recognize without seeing the band name. For me, Agatha represents the beauty and ugliness of the band. There’s something very sexual about her, even if she’s put in these disgusting settings." The figure appears in the band's music video for “God’s on Vacation”, which was directed by Alixandra Petrovich. Other artists who have made album covers for Black Tusk include Jeremy "Hush" Clark and Brian Mercer, both of whom created their own illustrations of the Agatha character.

== Members ==
Current

- Andrew Fidler – guitar, vocals (2004–present)
- James May – drums, vocals (2004–present)
- Chris "Scary" Adams – guitar, vocals (2018–present)
- Derek Lynch – bass, synthesizer, vocals (2021–present)

Former

- Jonathan Athon – bass, vocals (2004–2014; his death)
- Corey Barhorst – bass, synthesizer, vocals (2014–2020)

Session/touring

- Tanner Hamilton – drums, bass, guitar

== Discography ==
Studio albums

- Passage Through Purgatory (2008)
- Taste the Sin (2010)
- Set the Dial (2011)
- Pillars of Ash (2016)
- T.C.B.T. (2018)
- The Way Forward (2024)

Extended plays

- When Kingdoms Fall (2005)
- Untitled demo (2006)
- The Fallen Kingdom (2007)
- Tend No Wounds (2013)
- Vulture's Eye (2014)
- Systems of Solitude (2026)

Compilation albums

- Years in Black (2020)

Split releases

- split with The Holy Mountain (2009)
- Low Country with ASG (2009)
- split with Fight Amp (2009)
- split with Dead Yet? (2012)

Non-album singles

- "Seeing Visions" (2016)

Other appearances

- "Ender of All" (live) and "Set the Dial to Your Doom" (live) on Label Showcase - Relapse Records (Scion A/V, 2012)
- "Gallows Hill" on Beyond Human (Graveface, 2019)
- "Mr. Self Destruct" (Nine Inch Nails cover) on The Downward Spiral Redux (Magnetic Eye, 2025)

== Music videos ==
List of music videos, showing year released and director(s) names
Title	Year	Director(s)	Album	Ref.
"Triumph of the Wolves"	2007		The Fallen Kingdom	
"Facedriver"	2007	Alixandra Petrovich	The Fallen Kingdom	
"Fixed in the Ice"	2007	Alixandra Petrovich	Passage Through Purgatory	
"Mind Moves Something"	2008	Jay Reiter	Passage Through Purgatory	
"Red Eyes, Black Skies"	2010	Kevin Custer	Taste the Sin	
"In Days of Woe"	2013		Tend No Wounds	
"Truth Untold"	2013	Brad Kremer	Tend No Wounds	
"God's on Vacation"	2016	Alixandra Petrovich	Pillars of Ash	
"Seeing Visions"	2020		Years in Black	
"Dance on Your Grave"	2024	Chris "Scary" Adams	The Way Forward	
"Breath of Life"	2024	Alixandra Petrovich	The Way Forward	
