= The Mercurymen =

British acoustic music trio

- Origin: London, United Kingdom
- Genres: Acoustic, folk rock
- Years active: 2006–2009, 2013–present
- Labels: Formerly Arista SONY BMG, Currently unsigned.
- Members: Jinder, Simon Johnson & Gavin Wyatt
- Past members: all original members
- Website: www.mercurymenmusic.com

The Mercurymen are a British acoustic music trio. They were signed by Arista Records in the UK in 2008. Their first album, Postcards From Valonia received a limited release in 2008.

The Mercurymen originally parted company in 2009 after being dropped by their record label and splitting from their management. However, at the time they expressed their hope to play again together when they were 'old and crinkly and hopefully not dead', a hope borne out by the band's decision to reunite in 2013.

During their "first" career, spanning the years 2006-2009, the band performed many live dates around the United Kingdom including acclaimed tours in support of Melody Gardot, Sinéad O'Connor and Deacon Blue.

Key influences include Crosby, Stills & Nash, Paul Simon, Del Amitri, Richard Thompson, Crowded House and Townes Van Zandt. The Mercurymen's contemporaries include Fleet Foxes and Bon Iver.

The Mercurymen also toured with Level 42, playing venues such as the Royal Albert Hall.

They performed live and appeared in interview on BBC Radio 2 on Janice Long's show in November 2008 and also played live on Bob Harris and Johnnie Walker.

The Mercurymen are Jinder, Simon Johnson and Gavin Wyatt. Wyatt and Johnson worked with music mogul Mickie Most before his death and are session musicians, working with, amongst others, Lana Del Rey, Aynsley Lister, Ed Drewitt, Jamelia, Rhys Morgan and Jon Allen. Johnson is also a songwriter for other artists.

Jinder continues to enjoy a lengthy solo career, resumed following the initial Mercurymen split. After The Mercurymen's departure from Sony BMG, Jinder signed to Universal Records subsidiary Mighty Village, who released his sixth solo album Crumbs Of Comfort (co-produced by fellow Mercuryman Simon Johnson) in September 2012.

In early 2013, after five years of requests and growing public demand, The Mercurymen announced that the band were to reunite, for an ongoing run of live dates and new material. There was an EP release in 2013, followed by the band's second album in 2014.
