= Pillars of Ash =

Studio album by Black Tusk
- Released: January 29, 2016
- Recorded: October 2014
- Studios: Cloud City Studios; Falcon Studios; Portland, Oregon
- Genres: Sludge metal; hardcore punk; stoner metal
- Length: 34:39
- Label: Relapse Records
- Producer: Joel Grind

Black Tusk chronology
Tend No Wounds (2013)	Pillars of Ash (2016)	T.C.B.T. (2018)

Pillars of Ash is the fourth studio album from American sludge metal band Black Tusk. The album was released in 2016 by Relapse Records.

== Background ==
Pillars of Ash was recorded in October 2014 at Cloud City Studios and Falcon Studios in Portland, Oregon with producer Joel Grind.

On the evening of November 7, bassist Jonathan Athon and his girlfriend were in motorcycle accident in downtown Savannah. Athon was placed in a medically induced coma and pulled from life support once it was determined that he had irreparable brain damage. The band confirmed his passing on November 9, 2014. In December, Black Tusk confirmed that they had finished recording their next album before Athon's death. They also announced a 2015 European tour with Black Label Society, and that Corey Barhorst (formerly of Kylesa) would fill in on bass duties.

In November 2015, Black Tusk shared "God's On Vacation" from their upcoming album. A music video directed by Alixandra Petrovich features the recurring Agatha figure that is on many of the band's album covers. "God's On Vacation" was later used in the launch trailer for Mortal Kombat XL. The songs "Born of Strife" and "Desolation of Endless Times" were made available to stream in December 2015 and January 2016, respectively.

Relapse Records released Pillars of Ash on January 29, 2016 on CD and vinyl formats. Black Tusk toured with Royal Thunder, Holy Grail, and Bask in support of the album. “Seeing Visions”, a leftover track from the Pillars of Ash recording sessions, was released in March with issue #24 of New Noise Magazine as part of their flexi disc series.

== Reception ==
Professional ratings
Aggregate scores
Source	Rating
Metacritic	80/100
Review scores
Source	Rating
AllMusic	4/5 stars
The Alternative	7.25/10
Consequence	B–
Dead Rhetoric	8/10
Exclaim!	8/10
Heavy Blog is Heavy	4.5/5 stars
The Heavy Chronicles	Positive
Last Rites	Positive
Louder Sound	4/5 stars
Metal Injection	7.5/10
New Noise Magazine	3.5/5 stars
Nine Circles	Positive
Pitchfork	8.2/10
The Sleeping Shaman	Positive

Exclaim! critic Natalie Zina Walschots gave Pillars of Ash an eight out of ten rating and wrote, "The heart of this record is a furious commitment to survival. It's gutting. It's heartbreaking. And it's pretty goddamn beautiful." Pitchfork writer Zoe Camp said "Black Tusk's combination of sludge, rock, hardcore, and death metal remains fluid, fertile, and most importantly, full of life, in spite of the tragedy that threatens to define it. Far from funereal, Pillars of Ash has plenty of love for good ol' heavy-metal melodies." Chris Aitkens of Montreal Rampage called the album "a powerful final chapter for the Savannah trio," declaring it a "posthumous masterpiece." AllMusic's James Christopher Monger wrote, "Pillars of Ash is a straight-up haymaker of an album; an oil-stained middle finger rising out of the brackish water of a swamp forest. The last Black Tusk offering to feature bass player Jonathan Athon, who passed away in November 2014 from injuries sustained in a motorcycle accident, the 11-track set is both workmanlike and punitive, and its charms are rank and crust-lined." In a review for Consequence, Adam Kivel gave the album a B– and said, "Pillars of Ash rockets through 11 tracks without looking back, without room for breath. The songs tend to blend together in the spin cycle, one screamed vocal track melting its way into the next, one thundering drum fill inseparable from another."

== Track listing ==
All songs were written by Black Tusk, except where noted.

Pillars of Ash track listing
No.	Title	Length
1.	"God's on Vacation"	2:48
2.	"Desolation of Endless Times"	2:25
3.	"Bleed on Your Knees"	4:05
4.	"Born of Strife"	3:06
5.	"Damned in the Ground"	2:59
6.	"Beyond the Divide"	2:35
7.	"Black Tide"	3:54
8.	"Still Not Well"	3:28
9.	"Walk Among the Sky"	4:10
10.	"Punkout" (originally by Tank 18)	2:16
11.	"Leveling"	2:53
Total length:		34:39

== Personnel ==
Pillars of Ash personnel adapted from liner notes.

Black Tusk

- Andrew Fidler – guitar, vocals, piano
- James May – drums, percussion, vocals
- Jonathan Athon – bass, vocals

Additional musicians

- Joel Grind – guitars on "Born of Strife"
- Chris Coyle – percussion on "Damned in the Ground"

Production

- Joel Grind – producer, engineering, mixing
- Brad Boatright – mastering
- Jeremy "Hush" Clark – cover art
- Jacob Speis – layout, illustrations
