= T.C.B.T. =

Studio album by Black Tusk
- Released: August 17, 2018
- Recorded: December 2017
- Studios: The Garage; Savannah, Georgia
- Genres: Sludge metal; hardcore punk; stoner metal
- Length: 42:27
- Label: Season of Mist
- Producers: Aphelion; Black Tusk

Black Tusk chronology
Pillars of Ash (2016)	T.C.B.T. (2018)	Years in Black (2020)

T.C.B.T. (an abbreviation for Taking Care of Black Tusk) is the fifth studio album from American sludge metal band Black Tusk. The album was released in 2018 by Season of Mist.

== Background ==
In March 2018, it was reported that Black Tusk signed to Season of Mist and was recording a new album. It is the band's first record with bassist Corey Barhorst, who replaced the late Jonathan Athon. T.C.B.T. was recorded at The Garage Savannah and co-produced by the band in conjunction with Aphelion, a production duo. Engineer and long-time collaborator Chris "Scary" Adams mixed the album, while the mastering was done by Brad Boatright at Audiosiege. Adams later joined the band as a second guitar player after the recording was finished.

In May 2018, Black Tusk premiered the song "Agali" from their upcoming album. In June, the band debuted “Burn the Stars” and announced a summer tour with Whores and WhiteNails. Two more songs, "Scalped" and "Closed Eye", were released in July and August, respectively. Season of Mist released T.C.B.T. on August 17, 2018, on CD, vinyl, and cassette formats.

== Reception ==
Professional ratings
Review scores
Source	Rating
Angry Metal Guy	3/5 stars
Everything Is Noise	Positive
Exclaim!	7/10
Ghost Cult	8/10
The Heavy Chronicles	Positive
Heavy Music HQ	4/5 stars
Louder Sound	3/5 stars
Metal Injection	7/10
MXDWN	Positive

In a review for Exclaim!, critic Mark Tremblay called T.C.B.T. the band's "finest work to date" and said, "Black Tusk have trimmed the fat and have rebuilt their sound in a way that brings the energy and vigor back. It is not only a sound longtime fans will appreciate, but a record that would make their long lost brother Athon proud." Chad Bowar of Metal Injection wrote, "Though the vocals vary from song to song, one thing that's consistent throughout is the killer riffs. Andrew Fidler provides a seemingly endless supply of memorable riffage that burrows their way into the listener's cortex." He gave the album a rating of 7 out of ten and said, "Black Tusk isn't flashy, but they take care of business, fulfilling the mission of T.C.B.T." MXDWN writer Jon Weigell described the album as "an adventure through Black Tusk’s astounding ability to turn chaos into catchy, flowing musicianship... TCBT represents hard work, heartbreak and a persevering group of lively musicians. This LP has all the elements to be one of the best of Black Tusk’s lengthy catalog."

== Track listing ==
All songs were written by Black Tusk.

T.C.B.T. track listing
No.	Title	Length
1.	"A Perfect View of Absolutely Nothing"	1:22
2.	"Closed Eye"	2:27
3.	"Agali"	3:47
4.	"Lab Rat"	4:10
5.	"Scalped"	4:47
6.	"Ghosts Roam"	4:10
7.	"Ill at Ease"	4:02
8.	"Rest With the Dead"	4:55
9.	"Never Ending Daymare"	2:56
10.	"Orange Red Dead"	4:05
11.	"Whispers"	3:29
12.	"Burn the Stars"	4:13
Total length:		42:27

== Personnel ==
T.C.B.T. personnel adapted from liner notes.

Black Tusk

- Andrew Fidler – guitar, vocals, production
- James May – drums, vocals, production
- Corey Barhorst – bass, synthesizer, vocals, production

Technical personnel

- Aphelion – production
- Chris "Scary" Adams – engineering, mixing
- Brad Boatright – mastering
- Brian Mercer – artwork
- Geoff Johnson – photography
