= From the Vaults, Vol. 1 =

- Album cover art by Shaun Beaudry

Compilation album by Kylesa
- Released: November 16, 2012
- Recorded: 2005–2012
- Studios: The Jam Room; Columbia, South Carolina
- Genre: Sludge metal
- Length: 41:48
- Label: Season of Mist
- Producer: Phillip Cope

Kylesa chronology
Spiral Shadow (2010)	From the Vaults, Vol. 1 (2012)	Ultraviolet (2013)

Professional ratings
Review scores
Source	Rating
AllMusic	4/5 stars

From the Vaults, Vol. 1 is a compilation album by American sludge metal band Kylesa, collecting previously unreleased tracks, alternate versions of released tracks, and one new song. It was released on November 16, 2012, in Europe and November 20, 2012, in North America through Season of Mist. The collection features a newly recorded track titled "End Truth" as well as a cover of Pink Floyd's "Set the Controls for the Heart of the Sun" and Buzzoven's "Drained".

== Track listing ==
1. "Intro"
2. "Inverse"
3. "111 Degree Heat Index"
4. "Between Silence and Sound II"
5. "Paranoid Tempo"
6. "End Truth"
7. "Bottom Line II"
8. "Wavering"
9. "Bass Salts"
10. "Drained"
11. "Set the Controls for the Heart of the Sun"
12. "Drum Jam"

== Personnel ==
From the Vaults, Vol. 1 album personnel adapted from the CD liner notes.

Kylesa

- Phillip Cope – vocals (2–8), guitar (2–8, 10, 11), bass (4, 6, 10), keyboards (4,6), theremin (1)
- Laura Pleasants – vocals (2–8, 10, 11), guitar (1, 3–7, 10, 11), keyboards (6)
- Carl McGinley – drums (1–8, 10–12)
- Tyler Newberry – percussion (1, 3, 4, 6, 7), keyboards (4)
- Eric Hernandez – bass (1, 3, 7, 9), drums (2, 12)
- Corey Barhorst – bass (5,8)
- Javier Villegas – bass (2)
- Jay Matheson – bass (11)

Additional personnel

- Philip Cope – producer, assistant engineer
- Jay Matheson – head engineer
- Steve Slavich – assistant engineer
- Zac Thomas – assistant engineer
- Dave Harris – mastering at Studio B
- Shaun Beaudry – art
- Casey McKinley – layout
