= Feeling Good Is Good Enough =

Studio album by ASG
- Released: October 11, 2005
- Recorded: May 2005
- Studios: Sound City Studios, Los Angeles, CA
- Genre: Stoner metal
- Length: 39:04
- Label: Volcom
- Producers: Matt Hyde; Philip Caivano

ASG chronology
The Amplification of Self-Gratification (2003)	Feeling Good Is Good Enough (2005)	Win Us Over (2007)

Feeling Good Is Good Enough is the third studio album by American stoner metal band ASG. It was their third studio album released by Volcom Entertainment. Singles from the album include "John Wayne", "Horse Whipper", and the title track. The quote "Feeling good is good enough" is a direct homage to the feature film Platoon when the words were said by Willem Dafoe to Charlie Sheen before he smoked marijuana out of a shotgun.

== Track listing ==
No.	Title	Length
1.	"Feeling Good Is Good Enough"	3:54
2.	"Dusty Roads"	3:51
3.	"Act Like You Know"	3:35
4.	"John Wayne"	3:43
5.	"Killers for Hire"	3:45
6.	"Horse Whipper"	4:24
7.	"Going Through Hell"	2:55
8.	"Yes, We Are Aware"	2:58
9.	"Matadors of the Heart"	2:53
10.	"Thirsting for More"	3:43
11.	"Cracks in the Sky"	3:21

== Personnel ==
Credits adapted from AllMusic:

ASG

- Jason Shi – lead vocals, guitar
- Jonah Citty – guitar
- Andy Ellis – bass, backing vocals
- Scott Key – drums

Additional

- Matt Hyde – audio production, engineer, mixing, producer
- Philip Caivano – audio production, producer
- Richard Woolcott – executive producer
- Mike Masters – audio engineer
- Edmond Monsef – mixing assistant
- Ryan Immegart – A&R, artwork, concept, layout design, photography
- Todd Messick – photography
