= The Way Forward (Black Tusk album) =

Studio album by Black Tusk
- Released: April 26, 2024
- Studios: Hidden Audio; Savannah, Georgia
- Genres: Sludge metal; hardcore punk; stoner metal
- Length: 35:52
- Label: Season of Mist
- Producer: Black Tusk

Black Tusk chronology
Years in Black (2020)	The Way Forward (2024)	Systems of Solitude (2026)

The Way Forward is the sixth studio album from American sludge metal band Black Tusk. The album was released in 2024 by Season of Mist.

== Background ==
In February 2024, Black Tusk announced their sixth studio album, The Way Forward. It is their first album to feature guitarist Chris Adams and bassist Derek Lynch as official members of the band. Adams contributed guitar and vocals, and also recorded and mixed the album at his studio, Hidden Audio. Mastering was done by Brad Boatright at Audiosiege. The Way Forward was released on April 26, 2024, via Season of Mist. Music videos were created for "Dance on Your Grave" and "Breath of Life", which were directed by Chris Adams and Alixandra Petrovich, respectively.

== Reception ==
Professional ratings
Review scores
Source	Rating
Angry Metal Guy	3/5 stars
Distorted Sound	8/10
Grave Noise	8.5/10
Head-Banger Reviews	4/5 stars
The Heavy Chronicles	Positive
Metal Epidemic	4/5 stars
Metal Hammer	5/7
Metal Temple	8/10
MetalSucks	4/5 stars
Visions	8/12

Distorted Sound magazine writer Tom Lewis said, "Black Tusk have made a fresh, uncompromising album with The Way Forward. Aside from a slight dip in the second half, this is powerful, defiant music – whatever the genre – that does an awful lot in its blistering 36 minutes." Mandy Scythe gave a positive review for MetalSucks, saying "Black Tusk are reinventing themselves fully on this new LP, The Way Forward... While it’s natural for any band’s sound to evolve over time, Black Tusk feel especially innovative..." Grave Noise Media critic Carl Fisher wrote, "Black Tusk return with an absolute banger of an album. A high energy, sludgy, punky, groovy, and riffy album that delivers passion and excitement from the very beginning with heavy power of Out of Grasp. The thick riffs are one thing, the hooky beat is another, but those dueling vocals are just exceptional." Pierro of The Heavy Chronicles said "The Way Forward stands proud at the crossroads of sludge-punk, hardcore metal and stoner thrash: sonic violence at its vilest. As soon as you press play, you’re plunged straight into the pit and start feeling kicks and blows with this unstoppable surge as a soundtrack."

== Track listing ==
All songs were written by Black Tusk.

The Way Forward track listing
No.	Title	Length
1.	"Out of Grasp"	2:47
2.	"Brushfire"	2:22
3.	"Harness (The Alchemist)"	2:35
4.	"Lessons Through Deception"	2:14
5.	"Breath of Life"	5:12
6.	"Dance on Your Grave"	2:54
7.	"Against the Undertow"	3:06
8.	"Lift Yourself"	3:31
9.	"Ocean of Obsidian"	2:50
10.	"Flee from Dawn"	3:38
11.	"The Way Forward"	4:39
Total length:		35:52

== Personnel ==
The Way Forward personnel adapted from liner notes.

Black Tusk

- Andrew Fidler – guitar, vocals, production
- James May – drums, vocals, production
- Chris "Scary" Adams – guitar, vocals, production, engineering
- Derek Lynch – bass, vocals, production

Other personnel

- Brad Boatright – mastering
- Brian Mercer – artwork
