= Ultraviolet (Kylesa album) =

- Album cover artwork by Sean Beaudry

Studio album by Kylesa
- Released: May 24, 2013
- Recorded: October–December 2012
- Studios: The Jam Room; Columbia, South Carolina
- Genres: Stoner rock, sludge metal, biker metal, psychedelic rock
- Length: 38:50
- Labels: Season of Mist (CD, vinyl, digital); SOM275
- Producer: Phillip Cope

Kylesa chronology
From the Vaults, Vol. 1 (2010)	Ultraviolet (2013)	Exhausting Fire (2015)

Professional ratings
Aggregate scores
Source	Rating
Metacritic	78/100
Review scores
Source	Rating
About.com	4.5/5 stars
AllMusic	4/5 stars
The A.V. Club	(B+)
Consequence of Sound	4/5 stars
CraveOnline	8.5/10 stars
Decibel	8/10 stars
Exclaim!	8/10 stars
Loudwire	4/5 stars
Metal Storm	(8.0/10)
Metalsucks	4/5 stars
Outburn	(9/10)
Paste	(8.7/10)
Pitchfork	(7.0/10)
PopMatters	5/10 stars
Punknews.org	4/5 stars
Slant Magazine	4/5 stars
Spin	(7/10)

Ultraviolet is the sixth full-length studio album by American sludge metal band Kylesa. It is the group's third album to be released through Season of Mist.

== Writing and recording ==
Writing for Ultraviolet was done periodically throughout the span of two years, unlike previous albums which were written and recorded during shorter periods of time. In an interview with Echoes and Dust, Philip Cope stated it was the first time he played the theremin a lot for an album, as well as incorporating instruments such as synthesizers and a skateboard guitar for the recording. According to Cope in an interview with HEAVY, "The biggest difference with Ultraviolet is that everybody now pretty much plays multiple instruments and we let everybody do what they want. Nobody has a particular role; no one has to play just guitar or just drums." It was also noted that Cope took on more of a "director" role during the recording process, with Laura Pleasants contributing more vocals compared to previous efforts.

== Theme ==
Speaking with Bearded Gentlemen Music, Cope stated that the album cover was done by Sean Beaundry. Explaining the imagery of the scarab beetle, Cope stated "I thought that it fit pretty well with this album, you know, just kinda look at it as scarabs basically being dung beetles that make things out of shit." continuing, "We kinda had a huge pile and we're making an album out of it. There's other symbolism like that on there as well."

The album title "Ultraviolet" is a reference to "reaching for the intangible; something that lies beyond our earthly reach." In an interview with eMusic, Cope explains, "I wouldn't be doing what I do now if I wasn't reaching for something more — even if I don't know exactly what that is.

== Promotion and release ==
The group released three tracks from Ultraviolet: "Quicksand", "Vulture's Landing" and "We're Taking This", prior to the album's release. Eventually, the album was made available for streaming in its entirety through Metal Hammer. It was ultimately released on May 24, 2013, in Europe and on May 28, 2013, in North America in CD, vinyl and digital download formats through Season of Mist. A coinciding North American headlining tour with Blood Ceremony, White Hills, and Lazer/Wulf from May 28 to June 22, 2013, in support of the release was scheduled as well.

== Reception ==
The aggregate review site Metacritic assigned an average score of 78 out of 100 to the album based on 19 reviews, indicating "generally favorable reviews".

Praising the album as one of the group's strongest efforts, Gregory Heaney of AllMusic remarked, "With such a layered and melodic sound, Ultraviolet represents a further refinement of the new direction they've been heading in, making it not only the band's most accessible work to date, but also their most purposefully written and solidly constructed, putting it in the running for the best album of their career." In regards to the band drawing more from their various influences, Sammy O'Hagar of Metalsucks commented, "Kylesa have never been shy about the fact that they're a multi-headed beast, but Ultraviolet may be the truest expression of the wildly varying nature of the band's personality thus far." CraveOnline's Iann Robinson lauded the effort as an "acid trip", stating, "Ultraviolet is the inside of the Monolith, the theme in God's mind's eye and a commanding, visceral record that invites us to think, feel and experience the music all at once." At Outburn, Jeff Treppel called this "possibly the best release yet from a consistently great band, but then, that's the case with every new album they put out."

In a somewhat mixed response, Pitchfork's Grayson Currin expressed, "Ultraviolet rarely feels singular or confident; it's the sound of a band attempting to underline its claims to distinction." He continued, "But when Kylesa allows those extrinsic factors to emphasize their momentum rather than detract from it, they are unstoppable..."

On the day of the album's release, Stereogum named the record their "album of the week".

== Track listing ==
No.	Title	Length
1.	"Exhale"	3:02
2.	"Unspoken"	4:47
3.	"Grounded"	3:13
4.	"We're Taking This"	2:41
5.	"Long Gone"	3:26
6.	"What Does It Take"	2:04
7.	"Steady Breakdown"	4:48
8.	"Low Tide"	3:35
9.	"Vulture's Landing"	3:15
10.	"Quicksand"	2:34
11.	"Drifting"	5:25
Total length:		38:50

== Personnel ==
Ultraviolet album personnel adapted from the CD liner notes.

Kylesa

- Laura Pleasants – vocals, guitar, bass
- Philip Cope – vocals, guitar, bass, keyboards, theremin, percussion
- Carl McGinley – drums, percussion
- Eric Hernandez – bass, drums, guitar

Guest musicians

- Jay Matheson – bass on "Exhale", "Quicksand", and "Drifting"
- Brett Kent – keyboard on "Drifting"
- Steve Sancho – percussion on "Low Tide"

Production

- Philip Cope – producer, engineering
- Jay Matheson – engineer
- Steve Slavish – assistant engineer
- Jamey Rogers – assistant engineer
- Zac Thomas – assistant engineer
- Greg Slattery – studio assistant
- Brett Kent – studio assistant
- Dave Harris – mastering at Studio B, Charlotte, North Carolina

Album artwork

- Shaun Beaudry – illustrations
- Casey Mckinley – layout

== Charts ==
Chart	Peak position
Billboard 200	173
Billboard Hard Rock Albums	14
Billboard Heatseeker Albums	4
