= The Way Forward: Renewing the American Idea =

2014 book by Paul Ryan

- First edition
- Authors: Paul Ryan
- Language: English
- Publisher: Twelve
- Publication date: 2014

The Way Forward: Renewing the America Idea is a 2014 political book written by Paul Ryan, an American Republican Congressman from Wisconsin and 2012 vice presidential nominee.

== Content ==
The book starts with an autobiographical account of Ryan's childhood in Janesville, Wisconsin, up to the point when he found his alcoholic father's dead body when he was sixteen. He reveals that he used government assistance to survive during that period.

He goes on to explain that this tragedy motivated him to work harder and eventually run for office. He then explains how he handles congressional bills and politics in general, including his experience as a vice presidential nominee in 2012. He stresses the idea that civil society, not government, is what leads to job creation and growth.

Ryan goes on to argue that Republicans should stop preaching to the choir and start reaching out to new voters like Hispanics and African Americans.

== Critical reception ==
The book was only sold as an e-book on Amazon.com until Ryan complained about it on television. It was then sold at a discounted price with a quick shipping period.

In The National Review, George Will praised the book, suggesting it was a response to President Barack Obama from "a man who has a better mind and better manners". Similarly, Peter Wehner of Commentary Magazine described it as "both candid and self-reflective, and at times even self-critical".

Writing for The American Conservative, Ross Kaminsky suggested, "It is not an election tell-all, nor a screed intended to rile up the right-wing or harangue Democrats." He added, "Ryan's book is reasoned and explained well enough that even the mainstream media is having a hard time criticizing it." He concluded that the book was "a welcome and valuable addition to our ongoing political conversation". In The Washington Post, Matt Miller compared it to "drooled-upon pages of Ayn Rand". However, he agreed with Ryan that health-care expenditure would have to be curtailed.
