= Spike Magazine =

English internet cultural magazine

- Editor: Chris Mitchell
- Categories: Internet cultural
- Frequency: Monthly
- Founder: Chris Mitchell
- First issue: 1995
- Country: England
- Based in: Brighton
- Language: English
- Website: spikemagazine.com

Spike Magazine is an internet cultural journal which began in 1995, founded by its editor Chris Mitchell in Brighton, England. Updated monthly, its motto is "picking the brains of popular culture", though it has an intellectual inclination.

== Description ==
The focus of the magazine is mainly literary, and it features an extensive and eclectic back catalogue of book reviews, all available from the site's front page. It also includes features on a variety of subjects (including cinema and politics), music reviews, interviews, and the ongoing "blog" journal Splinters

Spike has had contributors from around the world over the years making for very varied outlooks. The general tone however tends towards the counter-cultural, controversial and left-wing, with a frequent championing of lesser-known writers. Nonetheless, Spike has managed to obtain interviews with a variety of big-name authors over the years, including J. G. Ballard, Will Self, Jeff Noon, Iain Banks, Hubert Selby Jr, Gitta Sereny, P. J. O'Rourke, Quentin Crisp, Nick Hornby, and Julie Burchill.

It contains separate sections devoted to news on Ballard, Noon, Self and Irvine Welsh.

Some of the main writers over the years have been Chris Mitchell himself, Stephen Mitchelmore, Ben Granger, Ismo Santala (the former three also having been regular contributors to the Splinters blog), Chris Hall, Gary Marshall, Eric Saeger, Ian Hocking, Robin Askew, Nick Clapson, Jayne Margetts, Craig Johnson, Katrina Gulliver, Nathan Cain, Nick Clapson, Dan Coxon and Adam Baron.

Spike Magazine ceased to run new articles in 2012, but the archive is still available online.
