= Cream Abdul Babar =

- Origin: Tallahassee, Florida, United States
- Genres: Noisecore
- Years active: 1994-present
- Labels: Underadar Records, Hyperrealist Records, Public Guilt Records, At A Loss Records
- Members: Jason Caldwell; Danny Rozenblum; Ian Powell; Tradd Sanderson; David Sanderson; Michael Hagerty; Derek Mitchka; Will Galotti
- Website: creamabdulbabar.com

Cream Abdul Babar is one of the longest-standing bands in the Tallahassee scene. The band formed in 1994, combining elements of punk, metal, industrial, and noise to create their brand of experimental rock. The band's name is a play on Kareem Abdul-Jabbar.

== History ==
The band's original 5-piece lineup was [singer] Ian Powell, Tradd Sanderson and Dan Rozenblum playing guitar, David Sanderson on bass and Jason Caldwell on drums. In 1995 they released their first EP titled Chlamydia Lunch. Shortly following their first release and tour, trombonist Mike Hagerty joined the band and appeared on the 1996 Cream Abdul Babar/I Guard the Sheep 7-inch split.

In 1997, Cream Abdul Babar entered the studio with Tallahassee-based recording engineer, Tommy Hamilton, and exited with their first full-length record, "The Backwater of Masculine Ethics." The band toured the entire US several times on this release, including 10–15 shows in Atlanta, GA alone.

In 1998, the band re-entered the studio, again with Tommy Hamilton, and also with new-found member Derek Mitchka on keyboards. The result was the "Buried in Broken Glass" EP. The band hit the road again, establishing themselves a dedicated following in Baltimore, Savannah and San Francisco, the entire state of Florida, and their already-solidified fan base in Atlanta.

The next several years involved writing and various U.S. tours, including tours with Mastodon, Dragbody, Meatjack, Damad, & Hawg Jaw. In 2002, CAB released their second full-length entitled "Catalyst To Ruins," which was released on Baltimore-based label At A Loss Recordings.

In 2003, Cream Abdul Babar released 2 split CDs, both recorded and engineered by Billy Anderson. The first, again released on At A Loss Recordings, was a split full-length LP & CD with Kylesa. The second was with Seattle-based art/noise/metal band Teen Cthulhu. This was released on Hyperrealist Records, based out of Savannah, GA. At this time, the band added their eighth member, Will Galloti, as second guitarist, moving Tradd Sanderson exclusively to noise / soundscapes.

In 2004, the Public Guilt label, also based out of Baltimore, released a double-disc remastered re-issue of all of Cream Abdul Babar's older self-released material and out of print splits, 7-inch releases, remixes and live material. This compilation is entitled "Excavation 1995-1998. It includes "Backwater of Masculine Ethics," "Buried in Broken Glass," the I Guard The Sheep split 7-inch, and a slew of other material, all remastered.

Cream Abdul Babar continue to be an influential band in the avant-metal scene, and are known to play live on occasion.

The band played a reunion show in Tallahassee, Florida, on April 8, 2017, nearly 10 years after their previous show.

== Members ==
- Jason Caldwell - Drums
- Danny Rozenblum - Guitar
- Ian Powell - Vocals
- Tradd Sanderson - Guitar, Noise
- David Sanderson - Bass
- Michael Hagerty - Trombone
- Derek Mitchka - Keyboard
- Will Galotti - Guitar

== Discography ==
=== Full-length albums ===
- The Backwater of Masculine Ethics (1997)
- The Catalyst to Ruins (2002)

=== EPs ===
- Chlamydia Lunch (1994)
- Buried in Broken Glass (1998)
- Covering the Track Marks (2006)

=== Splits ===
- Cream Abdul Babar / I Guard the Sheep (1996)
- Cream Abdul Babar / Mira - The Space (2002)
- Cream Abdul Babar / Kylesa (2003)
- Cream Abdul Babar / Teen Cthulhu (2003)

=== Compilations ===
- The Nervous System - AAJ Records Compilation (1998)
- Empower: Exercising the Human Spirit
- Excavation: 1995 - 1998 (2004)
