= Spiral Shadow =

Studio album by Kylesa
- Released: October 25, 2010
- Recorded: June 2010
- Studios: The Jam Room; Columbia, South Carolina
- Genre: Sludge metal
- Length: 40:02
- Label: Season of Mist
- Producer: Phillip Cope

Kylesa chronology
Static Tensions (2009)	Spiral Shadow (2010)	From the Vaults, Vol. 1 (2010)

Spiral Shadow is the fifth full-length album by American sludge metal band Kylesa, released by Season of Mist on October 25, 2010 in Europe and October 26, 2010 in the United States.

== Reception ==
Professional ratings
Aggregate scores
Source	Rating
Metacritic	85/100
Review scores
Source	Rating
AllMusic	5/5 stars
The Austin Chronicle	3.5/5 stars
Kerrang!	4/5 stars
Metal Injection	8.5/10
MetalSucks	4/5 stars
Pitchfork	8.4/10
PopMatters	8/10
Rock Sound	9/10
Spin	7/10
Sputnikmusic	4/5

The album received positive reviews upon its release, and currently holds a metascore of 85 on Metacritic based on nine reviews, indicating "universal acclaim". It is also the highest rated metal album of the year according to the same site. Many critics praised the band's fusion of different genres, including sludge metal and psychedelic rock.

=== Accolades ===
Publication	Country	Accolade	Year	Rank
Exclaim!	Canada	Top 10 Metal Albums of the Year	2010	4
Metacritic	International	The 40 Best-Reviewed Albums of 2010	2010	14
Pitchfork	US	Top 50 Albums of 2010	2010	44
Stereogum	US	Top 50 Albums of 2010	2010	7

== Track listing ==
No.	Title	Length
1.	"Tired Climb"	3:20
2.	"Cheating Synergy"	2:51
3.	"Drop Out"	4:29
4.	"Crowded Road"	3:29
5.	"Don't Look Back"	3:20
6.	"Distance Closing In"	3:51
7.	"To Forget"	3:32
8.	"Forsaken"	3:41
9.	"Spiral Shadow"	5:12
10.	"Back and Forth"	2:33
11.	"Dust"	3:44

== Personnel ==
Kylesa

- Phillip Cope – guitar, vocals
- Laura Pleasants – guitar, vocals
- Corey Barhorst – bass, keyboards
- Carl McGinley – drums
- Tyler Newberry – drums

Production

- Phillip Cope – producer, assistant engineering
- Jay Matheson – engineering
- Steve Slavich – engineering
- Carl McGInley – assistant engineering
- Zac Thomas – assistant engineering
- Dave Harris – mastering
- John Santos – artwork

== Charts ==
Chart (2010)	Peak position
German Newcomer Chart	14
Billboard Heatseekers Albums	11
