= Jinder (musician) =

English musician (born 1981)

- Born: 19 April 1981 (age 45); Banbury, Oxfordshire, England
- Occupations: Singer-songwriter; musician
- Instruments: Guitar; bass guitar; piano; synthesizer; banjo; ukulele; percussion
- Years active: 1998–present
- Labels: One Little Indian; (2001–2002); FrontSide Records; (2003–2004); Folkwit Records; (2005–2007); Arista SONY BMG; (2008–2009); Mighty Village/Universal; (2010–2012, 2019); Din of Ecstasy; (2009–present)
- Formerly of: Candlefire; Olas & Jinder; the Mercurymen
- Website: jinder.co.uk

Jinder (born 19 April 1981) is an English singer-songwriter and guitarist. He is best known for his extensive catalogue of dark folk- and country-influenced solo work, including his 2019 Top 40 single, 'Keep Me in Your Heart', which features in the 2019 film Fisherman's Friends and has been successfully covered by many other artists. He is also known for his brief tenure as the frontman of the Mercurymen. Jinder began his musical career as a teen.

== Career ==
=== Solo work and Candlefire ===
Jinder was born in Banbury, Oxfordshire, England, in 1981. From the late 1990s, he worked sporadically as a solo artist, before forming the alternative rock troupe Candlefire with Daniel Minshull, Rick Porter, and Mark McComish. The band are best remembered for their UK chart single "Sorrow Spreads Its Wings", released by One Little Indian Records in 2002. The single entered the UK Indie Chart at No. 17 and the mainstream chart at No. 97, dropping out of the top 100 the week after. Following the band's departure from the label in 2003, Jinder left Candlefire to pursue other musical directions. During his time with Candlefire, Jinder also continued his sporadic solo work, appearing live on a short solo tour and releasing the recording The Dusty Roads EP.

=== Olas & Jinder ===
In 2003, Jinder joined forces with fellow singer-songwriter Nick Cull, aka Olas, touring extensively together and releasing the album The Best of Days Ahead as Olas & Jinder, on the independent record label FrontSide Records in April 2004.

=== Return to solo work and the release of Willow Park ===
In 2004, Jinder amicably parted company with Cull and entered the studio to begin recording his debut solo album, Willow Park. During this time, he also toured in support of Martin Grech, recording and releasing Road: Live EP, a five-track album culled from various tapings of shows made during the tour. After nine months of recording, Willow Park was released in June 2005.

=== I'm Alive ===
In 2006, Jinder kept up his live schedule and also recorded his sophomore solo album, I'm Alive, produced by former Candlefire collaborator Stephen Darrell Smith.

=== Twenty Four Hours ===
In 2007, Jinder his third solo record, Twenty Four Hours.

=== The Three EPs ===
2007 saw the limited-edition release of The Three EPs, a compilation of Jinder's first three EPs—The Dusty Roads EP (2001), Road: Live EP (2004), and The Years of Winter EP (2005), with the addition of a cover of "Always on My Mind".

=== The Mercurymen and Postcards from Valonia ===
In 2006, following the sessions for I'm Alive, Jinder joined forces with Gavin Wyatt and Simon Johnson to form the Mercurymen. Stylistically influenced by artists such as Crosby, Stills & Nash, Richard Thompson, and John Martyn but driven by a folk-pop sensibility, the band recorded their debut release, The Keep Me in Your Heart EP in 2007, which was given a soft release by Flying Sparks Records in October of that year.

In early 2008, the Mercurymen were signed by Sony BMG to their Arista/RCA imprint, and began work on their debut album, Postcards from Valonia, which would be Jinder's sixth album and was scheduled to be released in 2009. The release never came about, however, following the band's departure from Sony BMG in November 2008. They toured extensively that year, playing just under 150 shows, including touring with Deacon Blue, Melody Gardot, Level 42, Sinéad O'Connor, along with several festival appearances, including a show at The Tartan Heart Festival at Belladrum, Scotland, and a headline tour of small venues during the summer.

The Mercurymen parted company amicably in July 2009, due in equal part to time constraints placed upon them by individual commitments, and their departure from Sony BMG the previous November.

=== Nine Cents from Benelux ===
In January 2009, Jinder returned to the studio to complete his new album, Nine Cents from Benelux, which was released through Din of Ecstasy on 29 June 2009. On completion of the record, Jinder embarked upon a solo UK tour, sharing a bill with fellow singer-songwriters Marcus Bonfanti and Lotte Mullan, which saw the three artists playing various venues on the UK roots music circuit.

Following the release of Nine Cents from Benelux, Jinder continued to tour extensively, promoting the album with a UK headline tour and radio broadcasts. Until the release of Crumbs of Comfort in 2012, Nine Cents from Benelux stood as Jinder's best-selling solo album, outselling his entire back catalogue.

=== Crumbs of Comfort ===
Following an extended period of seclusion in 2010 and 2011, spent writing the follow-up to Nine Cents from Benelux and starting a family, Jinder announced in March 2012 that his eighth album was completed and would be released as a limited-edition digipak CD via his website on 2 April 2012, before seeing a major international release via Mighty Village/Universal on 11 June. However, Crumbs of Comfort sold poorly upon release and proved to be Jinder's last release for Universal. The album eventually gained momentum through word of mouth, and, in the four years following its release, overtook Nine Cents from Benelux in sales to become Jinder's best-selling solo release.

Crumbs of Comfort contains Jinder's best-known song, "Keep Me in Your Heart", which was later recorded by classical crossover group Elysium III (2010).

The album also features "Let My Love Be Your Shelter", a cover of which featured on Nick Knowles' UK Top 20 album Every Kind of People in 2018.

=== Mercurymen reunion ===
In January 2013, a press release claimed that the Mercurymen were to return to live and studio work following a four-year hiatus. A short six-date reunion tour was booked, and the band played to sold-out audiences across the UK, debuting new material and playing the highlights of their previous releases Postcards from Valonia and The Keep Me in Your Heart EP.

=== Traditional Dark ===
In late 2014, it was announced via Jinder's social media platforms that a new album was in the final stages of mixing and scheduled for release in the new year. The first Jinder album recorded to tape, Traditional Dark was released in February 2015 through Din of Ecstasy Records. Jinder self-produced and recorded all vocals and instruments on the album himself, with the exception of the drums, provided by Ryan Halsey.

=== Deluxe-edition reissue campaign ===
In October 2015, Din of Ecstasy digitally re-released Jinder's entire back catalogue in deluxe-edition format. All records were digitally remastered and feature over fifty previously unheard bonus tracks. The biggest scoop of the reissues campaign was the release of the "lost" album Brother Flower: The Songs of Townes Van Zandt.

The albums reissued were:

- The Best of Days Ahead (2004)
- Willow Park (2005)
- Have Yourself a Jinder Little Christmas (2005)
- Brother Flower: The Songs of Townes Van Zandt (2006)
- I'm Alive (2006)
- Twenty Four Hours (2007)
- Postcards from Valonia (2008)
- Crumbs of Comfort (2012)

=== Jinder Presents... Kingsize Blackfoot ===
In December 2016, Jinder announced the release of a Christmas single and the impending arrival of a new album in mid-2017. The album, titled Jinder Presents...Kingsize Blackfoot, was published on 17 July 2017, following the release of the first single, "Brother Can You Spare a Dime", on 22 May 2017.

=== Traditional Dark: The Director's Cut ===
During early sessions for his forthcoming eleventh album, The Silver Age, Jinder took the decision to remix and remaster 2015's Traditional Dark, releasing it digitally on 8 March 2019.

=== Fisherman's Friends ===
In late 2018, it was announced that a new version of Jinder's best-known song, "Keep Me in Your Heart", re-recorded by the artist in collaboration with producer The Atlas, was to be featured in the film Fisherman's Friends, which was released in March 2019.

=== The Silver Age ===
In 2019, Jinder announced via social media that he was midway through recording a new album, titled The Silver Age, with producer Pete Millson. After a highly successful crowdfunding campaign to raise the required funds to complete the album, the first single, "Overthinkers Anonymous", was released. Peaking at No. 14 in the UK download charts for iTunes, "Overthinkers Anonymous" was a departure from Jinder's folk and roots stylings and presented a new direction of 1980s-style synth-driven pop/rock.

Following the success of "Overthinkers Anonymous", the followup single, "The Train to the Sky", met a more muted response, eventually reaching No. 62 with some regional radio support. The third single from the album, the orchestral ballad "I Still Believe", fared much better, peaking at No. 42 and selling consistently well, dipping in and out of the charts for six weeks.

The album The Silver Age was released in February 2020 and has, to date, been Jinder's best-received solo record, selling respectably, despite the entire UK and European tour for the album being cancelled due to the COVID-19 pandemic.

=== Almanac for the Failing Days ===
In July 2020, Jinder announced via social media that a brand new album, titled Almanac for the Failing Days, would be released via Din of Ecstasy on 7 August.

In the press release, Jinder stated, "producer Pete Millson and I doubled down during the Covid-19 crisis, and created a musical document of the world disintegrating around us". Some of the ten songs from the album were premiered during Jinder's livestream concerts during lockdown in the spring of 2020, including "Settle Down", "Kamloops, BC", and "Shawcross", a character portrait of serial killer Arthur Shawcross.

Canadian rock band The Tragically Hip are a notable influence on Almanac..., most obviously on the track "Canada's Band", which directly references the late Hip frontman, Gord Downie, and the song "Yer Life in Rain".

The closing track, "Trust, Josephine", tells the story of the Anastasia Yeshchenko murder case from the perspective of Oleg Sokolov, the man convicted of her killing.

== Discography ==
=== Solo ===
- The Dusty Roads EP (1999)
- Road: Live EP (2004)
- Willow Park (2005)
- The Years of Winter EP (2005)
- Have Yourself a Jinder Little Christmas (2005)
- I'm Alive (2006)
- The Three EPs (Compilation, 2007)
- Twenty Four Hours (2007)
- Nine Cents from Benelux (Compilation, 2009)
- Crumbs of Comfort (2012)
- Traditional Dark (2015)
- Brother Flower: The Songs of Townes Van Zandt (2015)
- Presents...Kingsize Blackfoot (2017)
- Traditional Dark: The Director's Cut (2019)
- The Silver Age (2020)
- Almanac for the Failing Days (2020)
- Codetta (2023)

=== Candlefire ===
- "Sorrow Spreads Its Wings" (Single, 2002)
- The Low Sun EP (2001)

=== Olas & Jinder ===
- "Something" (Single, 2003)
- The Best of Days Ahead (2004)

=== The Mercurymen ===
- Keep Me in Your Heart EP (2007)
- Postcards from Valonia (2008)
