= Kylesa =

American heavy metal band

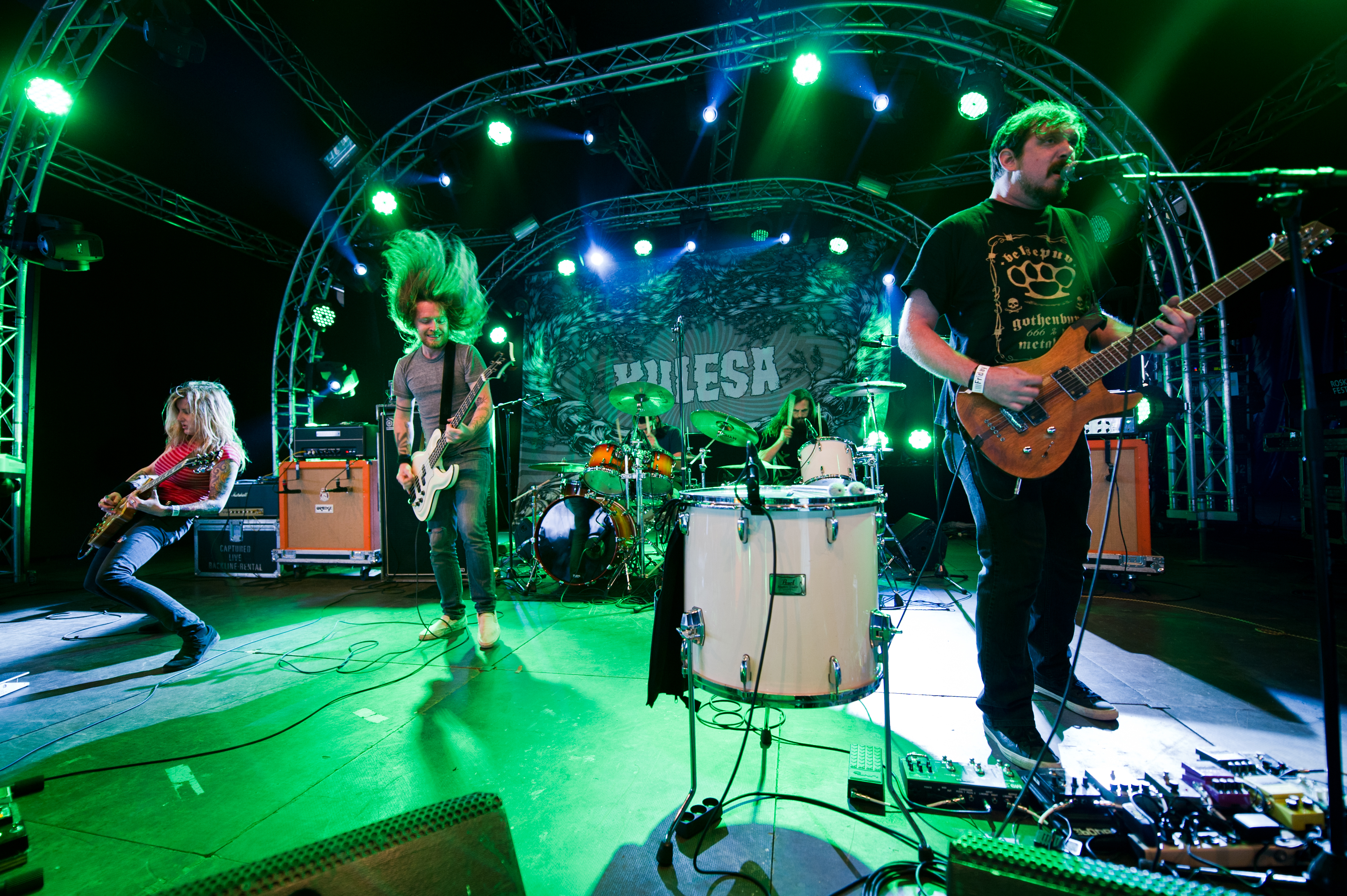
- Kylesa performing at Roskilde Festival 2011

Background information
- Origin: Savannah, Georgia, U.S.
- Genres: Sludge metal; stoner metal; psychedelic rock
- Years active: 2001–2016; 2024–present
- Labels: Season of Mist; Prosthetic; Havoc; Prank; 20 Buck Spin; La Familia; Alternative Tentacles; Retro Futurist; Heavy Psych Sounds
- Members: Phillip Cope; Laura Pleasants; John John Jesse; Roy Mayorga
- Past members: Christian Depken; Brian Duke; Corey Barhorst; Brandon Baltzley; Carl McGinley; Jeff Porter; Tyler Newberry; Eric Hernandez; Javier Villegas; Chase Rudseal
- Website: www.kylesamusic.com

Kylesa is an American sludge metal band from Savannah, Georgia. Their music incorporates experimentalism with heavy riffs, drop-tuned guitars and elements of psychedelic rock. The group was established in 2001 by former members of Damad with the addition of Laura Pleasants, who is from North Carolina. Numerous lineup changes have left guitarists Phillip Cope and Laura Pleasants as the only remaining original members. Kylesa went on an indefinite hiatus in 2016 and returned eight years later with a new rhythm section consisting of former Nausea members John John Jesse and Roy Mayorga.

== History ==
Philip Cope began playing in hardcore punk groups during the late 1980s, and by 1992, he booked bands such as Buzzoven and Neurosis at a local all-ages club in Savannah. His impact on the city's music community has led to him being described as the "godfather" of Savannah's metal scene. From 1993 to 2001, Cope played guitar for local sludge metal act Damad, an influential group whose members included vocalist Victoria Scalisi, drummer Scott Cooper, bassist Brian Duke, and drummer Christian Depken. Pat Mathis of Passive Fist Records said that Damad "established a sound that's stuck [around] – that whole heavy, doomy southern kind of metal. When you've got these old punk guys who listen to the Allman Brothers and start a metal band, that's kind of what you get." After Damad broke up, Scalisi and Cooper went on to establish Karst, while the other members formed Kylesa.

Kylesa began in 2001 with a lineup of Phillip Cope, Brian Duke, Christian Depken, and Laura Pleasants, a native of North Carolina who attended the Savannah College of Art and Design. Their name is a variation of "kilesa mara", a Buddhist term denoting delusory mental states. After recording the majority of their debut album in May, the band played its first live show on June 2, 2001, with Mastodon and Cream Abdul Babar in Savannah, Georgia. Four days later, bassist Brian Duke died from an epileptic seizure. The band decided to finish the album in his honor, returning to the studio in August to record two songs with their friend Michael Redmond, a local bass player. In 2002, Prank Records released the 7-inch single "Point of Stillness", followed by Kylesa's self-titled debut album. Both releases featured artwork from Brian "Pushead" Schroeder, who designed the band logo that is used on all of Kylesa's merchandise and releases.

Bassist Corey Barhorst was recruited to replace the late Brian Duke, and the band recorded material that would appear on two split releases: a 7-inch with Memento Mori, released in 2002 via Hyperrealist Records, and a full-length with Cream Abdul Babar, released in 2003 by At a Loss Recordings. Another recording session with this lineup yielded two more 7-inches, which were combined into an EP. Released in 2004 by Prank, the enhanced CD features three original songs, a cover version of Nausea's "Clutches", and a music video for "A 100° Heat Index". That same year, Christian Depken left the group and was replaced by drummer Brandon Baltzley. Kylesa signed with the independent metal label Prosthetic Records and recorded their second proper album, To Walk a Middle Course, which was released in 2005. Baltzley left the band by early 2006 and was replaced by a pair of drummers, Carl McGinley (of Unpersons) and Jeff Porter.

Kylesa's third studio album, Time Will Fuse Its Worth, was released in 2006 via Prosthetic. The band recorded cover versions of songs by Eyehategod, Syd Barrett, and Pink Floyd, which were featured on different compilation albums. It was around this time that Corey Barhorst and Jeff Porter parted ways with Kylesa. Bassist Javier Villegas and drummer Eric Hernandez (of Capsule) joined prior to the recording of their fourth album, Static Tensions, which Prosthetic released in 2009. Two of its songs were inspired by the shooting of Savannah musician Jason Statts. To support the album, the band toured with Mastodon, whose guitarist Bill Kelliher said, "We took Kylesa on tour because we love those guys and have been hanging out with them for years. They blew a lot of people's expectations out of the water." By December 2009, it was reported that Kylesa had sold 75,000 albums.

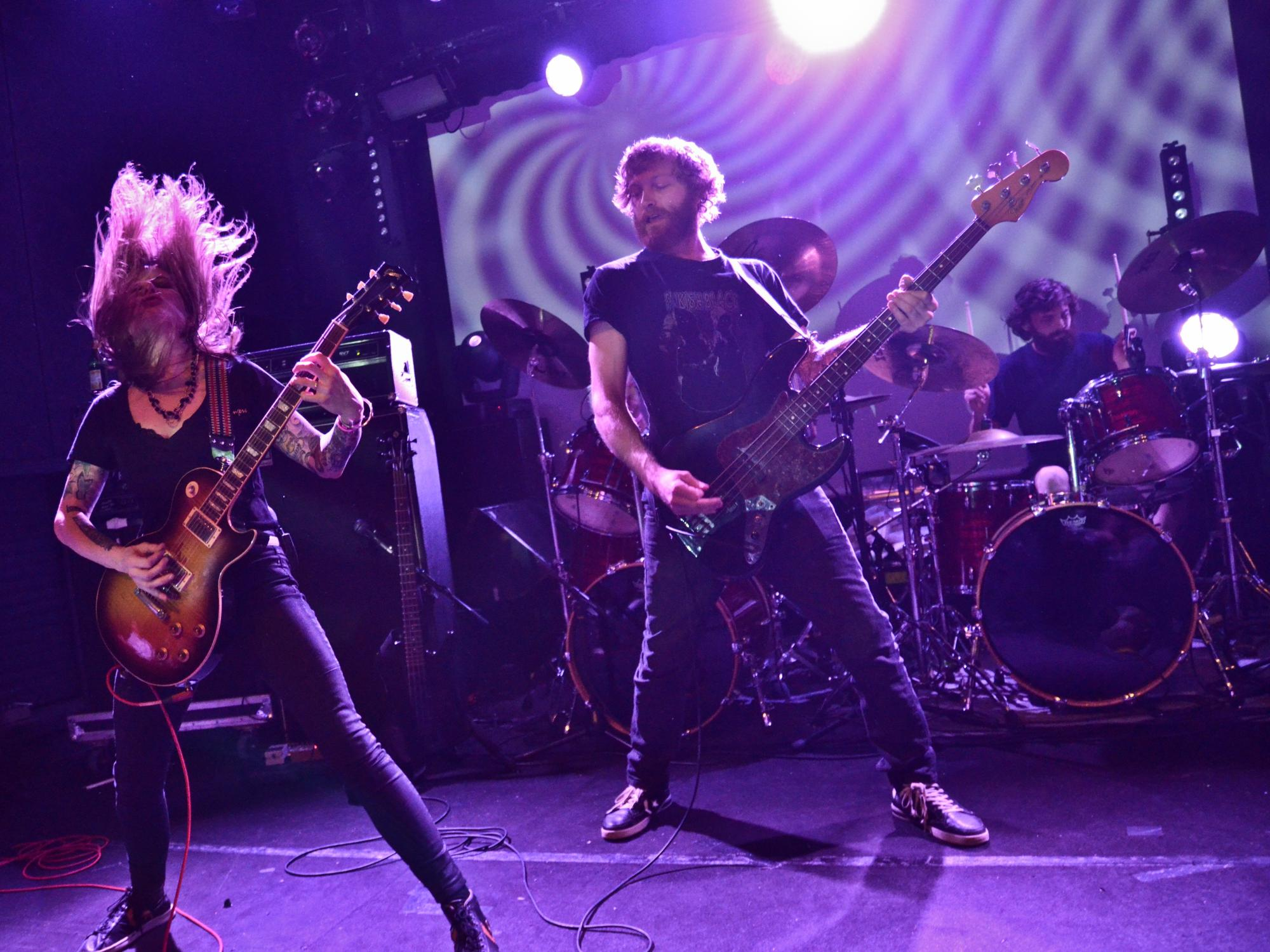
Kylesa in 2014

In 2010, Kylesa signed with the record label Season of Mist. Bassist Corey Barhorst and drummer Tyler Newberry returned to the lineup and participated in the recording of the band's fifth album, Spiral Shadow, which came out in October. Two years later, the band put together a compilation album titled From the Vaults, Vol. 1, which collects previously unreleased tracks, alternate versions of songs, and a new song titled "End Truth". Barhorst and Newberry departed Kylesa for the second time, and multi-instrumentalist Eric Hernandez returned before the recording of their sixth studio album, Ultraviolet, which was issued through Season of Mist in 2013. The record contains more vocals from guitarist Laura Pleasants and is said to be darker than previous works. Kylesa embarked on a full North America headlining tour to promote Ultraviolet, with direct support from Blood Ceremony, White Hills, and Lazer Wulf.

Kylesa's members launched their own record label, Retro Futurist, in 2013. The first release from the label was Pslip from Canadian progressive metal band Sierra. In February 2014, Kylesa performed a live set in Maida Vale Studios for BBC Radio 1's Rock Show with Daniel P. Carter. This performance would later be released as an EP. The group released their seventh studio album, Exhausting Fire, in 2015 through Season of Mist. They promoted the album with a North American tour that featured Inter Arma, Indian Handcrafts, and Irata as supporting acts. In April 2016, Kylesa announced in a Facebook post that they would be going on an indefinite hiatus with "no set date to reconvene". Two years later, Season of Mist released Live at Maida Vale Studio, an EP that consists of the band's 2014 live set performed for BBC Radio 1.

In August 2024, the band announced that they had returned from their hiatus and would perform at the 2025 Roadburn Festival. This was followed by announcements from ArcTanGent Festival in the UK, Inferno Fest in Norway, and A Colossal Weekend in Denmark. Kylesa's new lineup includes founding members Phillip Cope and Laura Pleasents along with a new rhythm section consisting of former Nausea members John John Jesse and Roy Mayorga.

== Musical style ==
Kylesa is most often classified as sludge and stoner metal. AllMusic stated that the band borrows "elements of hardcore punk, psychedelic stoner rock, technical speed metal, and good old-fashioned Black Sabbath sludge." Journalist David Peisner of Spin described Kylesa as "dark psych-metal titans", practicing an "aggressive [sound], but with a hazy, stoner vibe that suggests a strange amalgamation of Black Sabbath, Black Flag, and early Pink Floyd."

The band has two lead vocalists, Phillip Cope and Laura Pleasants, who have served as the only constant members throughout various lineup changes. Beginning in 2006 with the addition of Carl McGinley and Jeff Porter, Kylesa employed two drummers. The dual drum tracks are often panned to the left and right, producing a "complex and heavily layered sonic texture" that gives their sound "a thicker punch." McGinley remained a fixture in the band until they went on an indefinite hiatus in 2016. Kylesa returned as a four-piece in 2024, utilizing only one drummer.

== Band members ==
Current members

- Phillip Cope – vocals, guitars, samples (2001–2016, 2024–present)
- Laura Pleasants – vocals, guitars (2001–2016, 2024–present)
- John John Jesse – bass (2024–present)
- Roy Mayorga – drums (2024–present)

Former members

- Christian Depken – drums, percussion (2001–2004)
- Brian Duke – bass, vocals (2001; died 2001)
- Corey Barhorst – bass, vocals (2001–2007, 2009–2011)
- Brandon Baltzley – drums, percussion (2004–2005)
- Carl McGinley – drums, percussion, keys, samples (2006–2016)
- Jeff Porter – drums, percussion (2006–2007)
- Tyler Newberry – drums, percussion (2007, 2010–2012)
- Eric Hernandez – drums, percussion (2008–2009, 2012–2015); bass (2012)
- Javier Villegas – bass (2008–2009)
- Chase Rudeseal – bass (2012–2015)

Live musicians

- Jason Cadwell – drums, percussion (2005)
- Marshall Kirkpatrick – drums, percussion (2009)
- Edley O'Dowd – drums, percussion (2014)

Session musicians

- Michael Redmond – bass and vocals (on Kylesa)
- Bobby Scandiffio – guitar and crickets (on Time Will Fuse Its Worth)
- Jay Matheson – bass (on Ultraviolet and Exhausting Fire)

Timeline

== Discography ==
Studio albums

- Kylesa (2002)
- To Walk a Middle Course (2005)
- Time Will Fuse Its Worth (2006)
- Static Tensions (2009)
- Spiral Shadow (2010)
- Ultraviolet (2013)
- Exhausting Fire (2015)

Singles and EPs

- Point of Stillness (2002)
- No Ending / A 110° Heat Index (2004)
- Delusion on Fire (2004)
- Unknown Awareness (2009)
- Violitionist Sessions (2013)
- Live Studio Improvisation 3.7.14 (2014)
- Live at Maida Vale Studios (2017)

Split releases

- Split with Memento Mori (2002)
- Split with Cream Abdul Babar (2003)
- Split with Victims (2009)

Compilations

- Bacteria Sour double 7" (2004)
- From the Vaults, Vol. 1 (2012)
- An Original Album Collection (2017)

Other appearances

- "Delusion on Fire" on Super Sabado Gigante (625/Prank/Six Weeks, 2003)
- "Left to Starve" (Eyehategod cover) on For the Sick (Emetic, 2007)
- "Interstellar Overdrive" (Syd Barrett cover) on Like Black Holes in the Sky (Dwell, 2008)
- "Set the Controls for the Heart of the Sun" (Pink Floyd cover) on Falling Down Compilation (Falling Down, 2008)
- "Forsaken" on Metal Swim (Williams Street, 2010)
- "Black Coffee" (Black Flag cover) on Slip It In: The CVLT Nation Sessions (CVLT Nation, 2015)
- "Come as You Are" (Nirvana cover) on Whatever Nevermind (Robotic Empire, 2015)

Music videos

- "A 100º Heat Index" (2004)
- "Where the Horizon Unfolds" (2006)
- "Hollow Severer" (2007)
- "Tired Climb" (2010)
- "Unspoken" (2013)
- "Low Tide" (2013)
- "Lost and Confused" (2015)

== Bibliography ==
- Peisner, David (December 2009). "Metal in the Garden of Good and Evil". Spin. 25 (12): 65–70. ISSN 0886-3032.
