= Baroness discography =

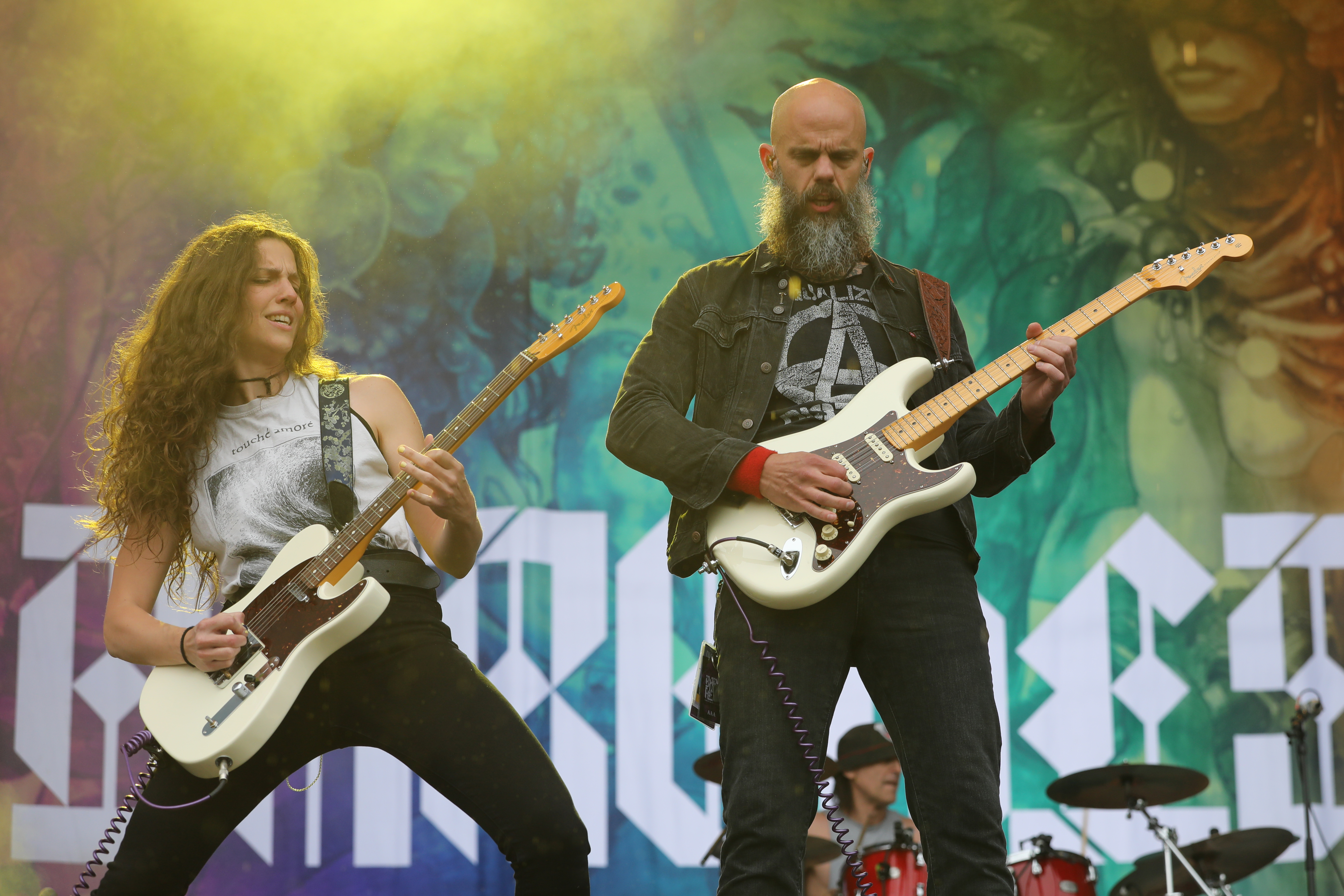
- Baroness performing in 2022
- Studio albums: 6
- EPs: 4
- Compilation albums: 1
- Singles: 13
- Music videos: 14
- Splits: 2

The discography of American heavy metal band Baroness consists of six studio albums, one compilation album, four extended plays (EPs), thirteen singles, two splits, and fourteen music videos. Formed in Savannah, Georgia in 2003, the group was originally composed of vocalist and guitarist John Baizley, guitarist Tim Loose, bassist Summer Welch and drummer Allen Blickle. Signed to Hyperrealist Records, the band released their first two EPs, titled First and Second, in 2004 and 2005, respectively. The split album A Grey Sigh in a Flower Husk – featuring two tracks by Baroness and four by fellow Savannah-based band Unpersons – was released in June 2007. After Loose was replaced by guitarist Brian Blickle, the band released its debut full-length studio album, Red Album, through Relapse Records in September 2007.

A second lineup change followed in September 2008, when Blickle left the band after three years and was replaced by guitarist and vocalist Pete Adams. The first two Baroness EPs were reissued together as the compilation album First & Second in October 2008. The group's second album, Blue Record, was released in October 2009. Blue Record was the band's first release to chart, reaching number 117 on the US Billboard 200 and topping the Heatseekers Albums chart. Welch left Baroness in late 2011 and was replaced in 2012 by bassist Matt Maggioni, although the bass parts on the group's third album were performed by Baizley. Yellow & Green, released in July 2012, reached number 30 on the Billboard 200. Lead single "Take My Bones Away" registered at number 38 on the Billboard Mainstream Rock chart and 35 on the Active Rock chart, while March to the Sea reached 37 on the Active Rock chart.

In August 2012, while on tour to promote Yellow & Green, Baroness were involved in a bus crash which resulted in injuries that hospitalized Baizley, Blickle and Maggioni. The band canceled the remaining concerts and spent months recovering. Shortly after the group announced they would return to touring, it was revealed that Blickle and Maggioni were leaving Baroness. The departed members were replaced by drummer Sebastian Thomson and bassist Nick Jost. Baroness released its fourth album, Purple, in December 2015 through their own record label, Abraxan Hymns. The album reached number 70 on the Billboard 200, while the single "Shock Me" registered at number 28 on the Mainstream Rock chart and earned a Grammy nomination at the 59th Annual Grammy Awards.

In 2017, Pete Adams left Baroness and was replaced by guitarist and vocalist Gina Gleason. The band released its fifth album, Gold & Grey, to critical acclaim in June 2019. The album peaked at 39 on the Billboard 200. Baroness' self-produced sixth album, Stone, was released in September 2023. Stone debuted at 115 on the Billboard 200, while the single "Last Word" appeared at 12 on Billboard's LyricFind U.S. chart.

== Studio albums ==
List of studio albums, with selected chart positions
| Title | Album details | Peak chart positions | | | | | | | | | |
| Title | Album details | US | AUT | CAN | FIN | GER | ITA | NED | NOR | SWI | UK |
|---|---|---|---|---|---|---|---|---|---|---|---|
| Red Album | Released: September 4, 2007; Label: Relapse; Formats: CD, 2×LP, CS, DL | — | — | — | — | — | — | — | — | — | — |
| Blue Record | Released: October 13, 2009; Label: Relapse; Formats: CD, 2×LP, CS, DL | 117 | — | — | — | — | — | — | — | — | — |
| Yellow & Green | Released: July 17, 2012; Label: Relapse; Formats: 2×CD, 2×LP, 2×CS, DL | 30 | 28 | — | 22 | 13 | 99 | 52 | — | 66 | 85 |
| Purple | Released: December 18, 2015; Label: Abraxan Hymns; Formats: CD, LP, CS, DL | 70 | — | 96 | — | 64 | — | 75 | 36 | 88 | 106 |
| Gold & Grey | Released: June 14, 2019; Label: Abraxan Hymns; Formats: CD, 2×LP, CS, DL | 39 | 20 | 72 | — | 14 | — | — | — | 32 | 64 |
| Stone | Released: September 15, 2023; Label: Abraxan Hymns; Formats: CD, LP, CS, DL | 115 | 50 | — | — | 20 | — | — | — | 20 | — |
"—" denotes a release that did not chart or was not issued in that region.

== Compilation albums ==
List of compilation albums
| Title | Album details |
|---|---|
| First & Second | Released: October 5, 2008; Label: Hyperrealist; Formats: CD, LP, DL |

== Extended plays ==
List of extended plays
| Title | EP details | Peak chart positions |
| Title | EP details | Vinyl Albums |
|---|---|---|
| First | Released: August 3, 2004; Label: Hyperrealist; Formats: CD, 12" | — |
| Second | Released: September 5, 2005; Label: Hyperrealist; Formats: CD, 12" | — |
| Live at Maida Vale | Released: July 23, 2013; Label: Relapse; Formats: 12", DL | 4 |
| Live at Maida Vale – Vol. II | Released: November 27, 2020; Label: Abraxan Hymns; Formats: 12", DL | — |

== Splits ==
List of split releases
| Title | Details | Contribution(s) |
|---|---|---|
| A Grey Sigh in a Flower Husk (with Unpersons) | Released: June 26, 2007; Label: At a Loss; Formats: CD, LP, DL | "Teiresias" "Cavité" |
| Untitled EP (with High on Fire and Coliseum) | Released: August 2007; Label: Relapse; Format: 7" | "O'Appalachia" |

== Demos ==
List of demo albums
| Title | Details |
|---|---|
| Demo | Released: 2003; Label: self-released; Format: CD-R |

== Singles ==
List of singles, with chart positions, showing year released and album name
| Title | Year | Peaks | | | Album |
| Title | Year | US Act. | US Main. | US Lyric. | Album |
|---|---|---|---|---|---|
| "A Horse Called Golgotha" | 2010 | — | — | — | Blue Record |
| "Take My Bones Away" | 2012 | 35 | 38 | — | Yellow & Green |
| "March to the Sea" | 2012 | 37 | — | — | Yellow & Green |
| "Chlorine & Wine" | 2015 | — | — | — | Purple |
| "Shock Me" | 2015 | — | 28 | — | Purple |
| "Try to Disappear" | 2017 | — | — | — | Purple |
| "Morningstar" | 2017 | — | — | — | Purple |
| "Borderlines" | 2019 | — | — | — | Gold & Grey |
| "Seasons" | 2019 | — | — | — | Gold & Grey |
| "Throw Me an Anchor" | 2019 | — | — | — | Gold & Grey |
| "Last Word" | 2023 | — | — | 12 | Stone |
| "Beneath the Rose" | 2023 | — | — | — | Stone |
| "Shine" | 2023 | — | — | — | Stone |
"—" denotes a release that did not chart or was not issued in that region.

== Guest appearances ==
List of non-single guest appearances
| Song | Year | Compilation | Label |
|---|---|---|---|
| "Front Toward Enemy" | 2019 | Metal Swim 2 | Williams Street Records |

== Music videos ==
List of music videos, showing year released and director(s) names
| Title | Year | Director(s) | Ref. |
|---|---|---|---|
| "Wanderlust" | 2007 | Joshua Green | |
| "A Horse Called Golgotha" | 2009 | Joshua Green | |
| "Take My Bones Away" | 2012 | Jimmy Hubbard | |
| "March to the Sea" | 2013 | Jimmy Hubbard | |
| "Chlorine & Wine" | 2015 | Jimmy Hubbard | |
| "Shock Me" | 2016 | Don Tyler & John Baizley | |
| "Try to Disappear" | 2016 | Jimmy Hubbard | |
| "Borderlines" | 2019 | John Baizley & Pamela Strohm | |
| "Seasons" | 2019 | John Baizley & Pamela Strohm | |
| "Tourniquet" | 2019 | Pamela Strohm | |
| "Last Word" | 2023 | Nick Jost | |
| "Beneath the Rose" | 2023 | Baroness | |
| "Shine" | 2023 | Baroness | |
| "Anodyne" | 2023 | Baroness | |
