= Live at Maida Vale – Vol. II =

EP by Baroness
- Released: November 27, 2020
- Recorded: September 27, 2019
- Studios: Maida Vale Studios; Maida Vale, West London
- Genres: Progressive metal; space rock; post-rock; psychedelic rock
- Length: 22:28
- Label: Abraxan Hymns
- Producer: Simon Askew

Baroness chronology
| Gold & Grey (2019) | Live at Maida Vale – Vol. II (2020) | Stone (2023) |

Live at Maida Vale – Vol. II is the second live extended play by American heavy metal band Baroness. It was released on Record Store Day through the band's own record label, Abraxan Hymns.

== Background ==
During a European tour in support of Baroness' fifth studio album Gold & Grey (which had released several months earlier), the band performed songs from the record live in Maida Vale Studios for BBC Radio 1's Rock Show with Daniel P. Carter. This session resulted in Live at Maida Vale – Vol. II, a follow-up EP to the group's original Live at Maida Vale release from 2013.

== Release ==
Live at Maida Vale – Vol. II was released through Baroness' Abraxan Hymns label as part of a Record Store Day Black Friday event. It received a limited-edition one-off pressing of 3500 copies on 12" vinyl. Like the original Liva at Maida Vale release, the A-side of the record contains all of the music while the B-side includes an etching of John Baizley's cover artwork. A week after the physical release, the EP was made available for streaming services and it was released as a digital download.

== Reception ==
In a review for the German online music magazine HeavyPop, Oliver Gutbrunner praised the production of Live at Maida Vale – Vol. II as sounding better than that of Gold & Grey's. He gave the EP a 6/10 rating, saying "If you absolve the band of their sludge heritage and classify it as consumer-friendly alternative/stoner rock, the performance has bite, even if the melodies and hooks remain interchangeable."

== Track listing ==
All music is composed by Baroness.

Live at Maida Vale – Vol. II track listing
| No. | Title | Length |
|---|---|---|
| 1. | "Throw Me an Anchor" | 3:31 |
| 2. | "Borderlines" | 6:15 |
| 3. | "I'm Already Gone" | 4:24 |
| 4. | "Tourniquet/Can Oscura" | 8:18 |
| Total length: | | 22:28 |

== Personnel ==
Baroness

- John Dyer Baizley – lead vocals, rhythm guitar, artwork
- Gina Gleason – lead guitar, backing vocals
- Nick Jost – bass guitar
- Sebastian Thomson – drums

Technical personnel

- Simon Askew – production, engineering
- Clive Painter – engineering
- Adam Boose – mastering
