= Second Album =

Second Album or 2nd Album may refer to:

- The Beatles' Second Album, a 1964 album by the Beatles
- Four Tops Second Album, a 1965 album by Four Tops
- Martin Carthy's Second Album, a 1966 album by Martin Carthy
- The Second Album (The Spencer Davis Group album), a 1966 album by the Spencer Davis Group
- Second Album (Curved Air album), a 1971 album by Curved Air
- Second Album, a 1973 album by Roy Buchanan
- Call Call Call, a 2005 album by U;Nee, also known as 2nd Album
- The Second Album (Latyrx album), a 2013 album by Latyrx
- Second, the second EP by Baroness

== See also ==
- Second album syndrome
- Second (disambiguation)
