= Unpersons =

Unpersons may refer to:

- Unpersons (band), from Savannah, Georgia
- Unpersons, a 2011 album by The Pack A.D.

== See also ==
- Unperson, a fictional term from the novel 1984
