= Gina Gleason =

21st-century female American guitarist

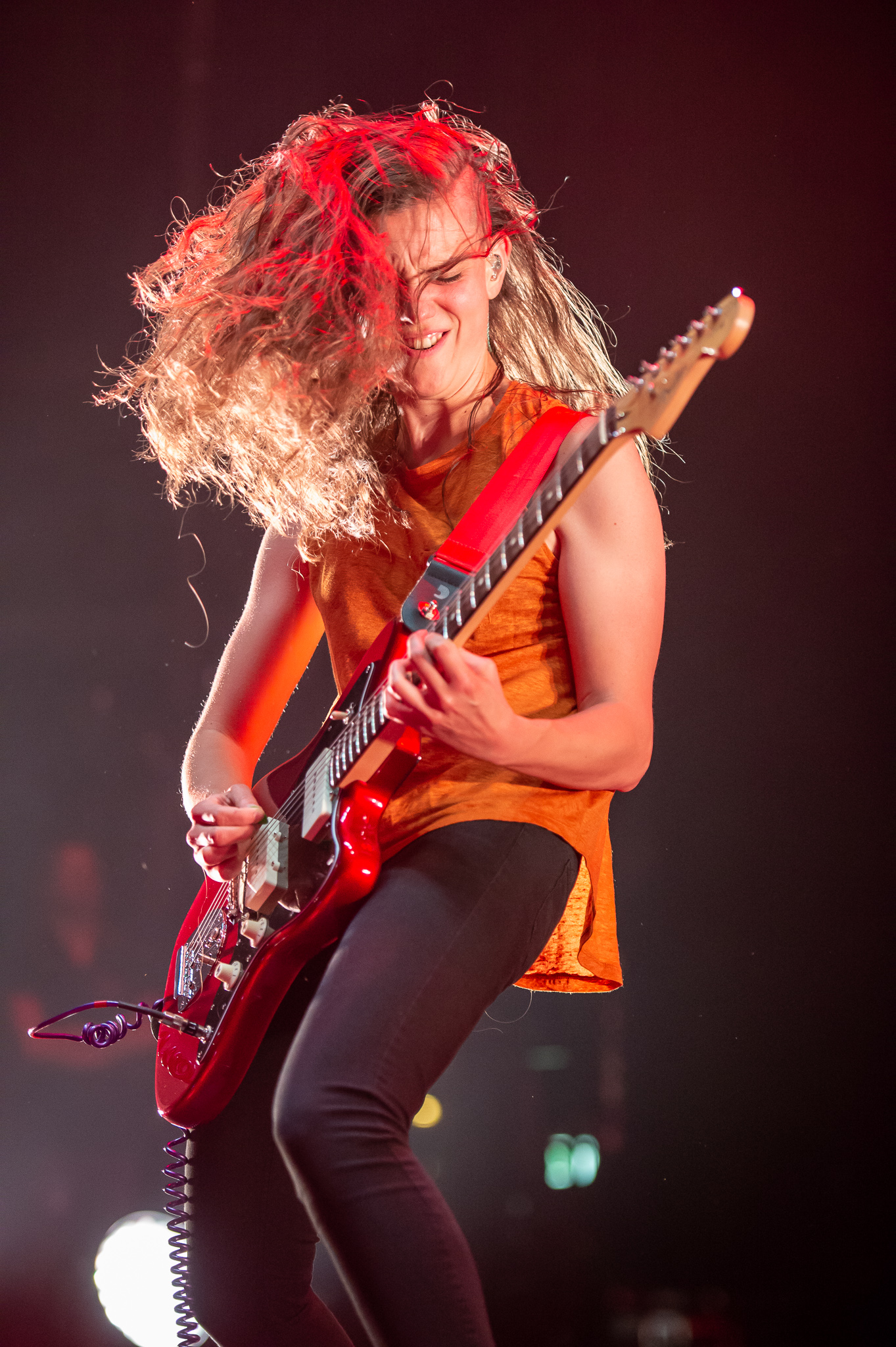

Background information
- Born: 1991 (age 34–35); Philadelphia, Pennsylvania, U.S.
- Genres: Heavy metal; sludge metal; hard rock
- Occupations: Musician and composer
- Instruments: Guitar; vocals
- Years active: 2008–
- Member of: Baroness

Gina Gleason is an American musician who is the current lead guitarist and backing vocalist for heavy metal band Baroness.

== Biography ==
Gleason was born in 1991 in Philadelphia, Pennsylvania, and graduated high school in 2010.

As a founding member, Gleason fronted and played lead guitar for Misstallica, an all-women Metallica tribute, between 2008 and 2012. She also played lead guitar for Queen Diamond, an all-women King Diamond tribute, between 2008 and 2011.

Gleason sat in with the Smashing Pumpkins during The End Times Tour at The Joint in Las Vegas. She performed with Carlos Santana during his residency at the House of Blues in Las Vegas and played on the Latin Grammys with Grammy award winner Carlos Vives in 2013. She has toured with Brendon Small, creator of Dethklok and co-creator of the animated series Metalocalypse, and with slide guitarist Denny Walley, performing at festivals such as Zappanale in Mecklenburg, Germany. Gina accompanied Jon Anderson of Yes for several performances on tour and at the NAMM Show in Anaheim, California. She played with Jello Biafra in 2007 during a performance on his spoken word tour and collaborated with The Good Listeners on the song “Never Good Enough” for the documentary “Don’t Quit Your Daydream”.

As a part of the Cirque du Soleil creation cast, Gleason played lead guitar and performed as the character “The Muse” in the production of Michael Jackson: One by Cirque du Soleil at Mandalay Bay in Las Vegas (2012–2017). Gleason co-composed original works for the 2016 Cirque du Soleil production of One Night for One Drop. The production was held live at The Smith Center as well as in theaters and IMAX nationwide.

After befriending Baroness frontman John Baizley, Gleason replaced the departing Pete Adams as the band's lead guitarist in 2017. Gleason's first studio album with Baroness was Gold & Grey, released in June 2019. Her second album with the band, Stone, was released in September 2023.
