= Stone (Baroness album) =

Studio album by Baroness
- Released: September 15, 2023
- Recorded: 2020–2023
- Genres: Progressive metal; alternative metal
- Length: 46:02
- Label: Abraxan Hymns
- Producer: Baroness

Baroness chronology
Live at Maida Vale – Vol. II (2020)	Stone (2023)

Singles from Stone
- 1. "Last Word" Released: June 20, 2023; 2. "Beneath the Rose" Released: July 14, 2023; 3. "Shine" Released: August 18, 2023

Stone is the sixth studio album by American heavy metal band Baroness. The album was released on September 15, 2023, through the band's independent label Abraxan Hymns and was self-produced by the band.

== Background and recording ==
In an interview with MetalSucks in September 2020, Baizley noted that Baroness had written approximately 30 new songs for what would become their sixth studio album. "We started doing Zoom meetings every Monday night, and mostly that's because we've been writing since March or April," he said. "We're talking about new stuff we're doing, which is all file sharing, all trading elements of songs, and [we're] hoping when we get together that they congeal." In November 2020, Baroness began recording the album at a rented vacation home in Barryville, New York. The following month, the band shared a four-track live EP entitled Live at Maida Vale – Vol. II on streaming services. The EP had previously been an exclusive Record Store Day vinyl release.

The band undertook the "Your Baroness" tour through North America beginning in 2021. The tour was a by-request show, with fans voting on which songs they wanted performed. The tour continued into 2022, with Baroness touring Europe and North America with bands such as Kvelertak, Mastodon, Killswitch Engage and Lamb of God. On October 18, 2022, Baroness announced their plans to have a new record out in 2023.

== Promotion and release ==
On June 15, 2023, the band shared a video online, teasing new music. On June 20, they published the lead single "Last Word" and an accompanying music video. At the same time, they officially announced the album and release date, revealing the album cover and the track list. To promote the album, Baroness embarked on a North American tour with support acts including Sheer Mag, Jesus Piece, Portrayal of Guilt and Primitive Man. On July 14, the band unveiled the second single "Beneath the Rose" and its corresponding music video. On August 18, the band released the third single "Shine".

== Critical reception ==
Professional ratings
Aggregate scores
Source	Rating
Metacritic	76/100
Review scores
Source	Rating
AllMusic	3.5/5 stars
Distorted Sound	8/10
Exclaim!	8/10
Kerrang!	5/5
Louder Sound	4/5 stars
Metal Injection	8/10
MetalSucks	4.5/5
New Noise Magazine	5/5 stars
Pitchfork	6.2/10
PopMatters	7/10

The album received acclaim from critics. At Metacritic, which assigns a normalized rating out of 100 to reviews from mainstream critics, the album has an average score of 76 out of 100 based on 7 reviews, indicating "generally favorable reviews". AllMusic gave the album a positive review saying, "In sum, Stone balances Baroness' carefully crafted shorter ambitions with mid-length jams to provide listeners with constantly shifting tensions, fluid dynamics, lush harmonies, and pile-driving riffs. Stone reveals a wide musical portrait of the ever-evolving Baroness, who seems to be embarking on a more expansive creative voyage." Will Marshall of Distorted Sound scored the album 8 out of 10 and said: "Baroness' refusal to repeat themselves and to evolve in some way with every record has paid off hugely here; while Stone takes its time to truly release its secrets (unless you're a prophesied king, perhaps), once it does it's a truly arresting album that sinks its hooks in deep. Six albums into their illustrious career, Baroness prove there's plenty of life and surprises left in them yet." Stephan Boissonneault of Exclaim! gave it 8 out of 10 and said: "It's one of their most streamlined and focused records yet." Kerrang! gave the album 5 out of 5 and stated: "By now, it's unnecessary to say Baroness are good, or that they're clever, or have some reviewer screaming at you that they get into bits of music other rock bands either can't get into or simply never think to try. You don't need telling to get on Stone – a Baroness record is recommendation enough. But in the context here, with the stones and everything, it's an entirely pleasing reminder that when they create something, it will stand for the ages."

Louder Sound gave the album a positive review and stated: "More than a simple distillation or a 'return to roots', Stone is an ideas-heavy brute in its own right: a monument to ambition and heaviness, and to refusing to rest too long in one place lest roots or languor take hold." Metal Injection rated the album 8 out of 10 and stated, "All in all, this is very different Baroness record. It's not really what I expected even though I knew the band was clear about their new direction. However, after a number of listens I've grown to really love it. This is different iteration of Baroness that has a bit more edge and experimentation. Do I love it as much as some of the band's classic records? Not quite. I mean, those chromatic records are all pretty damn good. However, the end result though is that the new record still works, and frankly, works wonderfully well." Jordan Blum of MetalSucks rated the album 4.5 out of 5 and said: "Because it doesn't last nearly as long as Gold & Grey, Stone somewhat lacks that record's expansive splendor. It more than makes up for it, though, by delivering a more focused, diverse, and accessible experience. In other words, it's just as amazing in its own ways, and regardless of where it ranks alongside its predecessor(s), it's clear that Baroness have rarely, if ever, sounded this united, motivated, resourceful, and special." New Noise Magazine gave the album 5 out of 5 and stated: "With Stone, the band has made a gem of a record that also may stand as their crowning achievement." In a positive review, Pitchfork wrote, "Baroness decided to downsize for Stone, their first album in four years, converting an Airbnb along the mountainous edge of Pennsylvania and New York into a studio where they could do everything themselves. This marked the first time that the same group of musicians who recorded the prior Baroness album reconvened to make the next one. Stone, however, begs for an outsider's input, for someone to have said, 'No, that's not it.' So much of Stone feels like stitched-together composites of what has worked well in the past. Momentum is often squandered, and the electrifying bits rarely rise into something more." Chris Conaton from PopMatters gave the album 7 out of 10 and said: "Stone is another strong entry into Baroness' catalog of quality albums. The oddball spoken word departures in 'Beneath the Rose' and 'Choir' are fascinating. It's also very good to hear Gina Gleason's harmonies so much this time; she's a great complement to Baizley's voice and a real asset to the group. The acoustic tracks are worthwhile, and the big, catchy singles 'Last Word' and 'Shine' are sure crowd-pleasers. However, it's not as ambitious as the dual-color records Yellow & Green or Gold & Grey, and it comes up a little short compared to the excellent Blue Record."

== Track listing ==
Stone track listing
No.	Title	Length
1.	"Embers"	1:00
2.	"Last Word"	6:17
3.	"Beneath the Rose"	5:34
4.	"Choir"	4:05
5.	"The Dirge"	1:18
6.	"Anodyne"	3:19
7.	"Shine"	6:31
8.	"Magnolia"	7:48
9.	"Under the Wheel"	6:10
10.	"Bloom"	4:00
Total length:		46:02

Japanese Edition bonus tracks
No.	Title	Length
11.	"Tower Falls" (Live)	6:28
12.	"Swollen and Halo" (Live)	7:09

Deluxe Edition bonus tracks (Your Baroness Tour)
No.	Title	Length
1.	"The Birthing" (Live)	5:30
2.	"A Horse Called Golgotha" (Live)	7:13
3.	"Eula" (Live)	6:43
4.	"Green Theme" (Live)	4:00
5.	"Desperation Burns" (Live)	4:44
6.	"I'd Do Anything" (Live)	3:58

== Personnel ==
Baroness

- John Dyer Baizley – lead vocals, rhythm guitar, keyboards, percussion, piano, organ, glockenspiel, production, engineering, art direction, cover, artwork, design, layout
- Gina Gleason – lead guitar, backing vocals, organ, glockenspiel, percussion, production, engineering
- Nick Jost – bass, keyboards, additional backing vocals, strings, synthesizer, glockenspiel, percussion, production, engineering
- Sebastian Thomson – drums, synthesizer, glockenspiel, production, engineering

Additional personnel

- Jun Murakawa – mixing, engineering
- Joe Barresi – mixing
- Bob Ludwig – mastering
- Chris Bellman – lacquer cut
- Surya Mahdiana – artwork

== Charts ==
Chart performance for Stone
Chart (2023)	Peak position
Austrian Albums (Ö3 Austria)	50
Belgian Albums (Ultratop Flanders)	66
Belgian Albums (Ultratop Wallonia)	81
French Albums (SNEP)	189
German Albums (Offizielle Top 100)	20
Scottish Albums (Official Charts)	19
Swiss Albums (Schweizer Hitparade)	20
UK Album Downloads (Official Charts)	26
UK Independent Albums (Official Charts)	10
UK Rock & Metal Albums (Official Charts)	5
US Billboard 200	115
US Independent Albums (Billboard)	29

== Accolades ==
Best-of lists

Publication	Country	Accolade	Year	Rank
Consequence	US	50 Best Albums of 2023	2023	48
MXDWN	US	Top 40 Best Albums of 2023	2023	18
Revolver	US	30 Best Albums of 2023	2023	24
Treble	US	30 Best Metal Albums of 2023	2023	8

Heavy Music Awards

Year	Nominee / work	Award	Result
2024	Stone	Best Album Artwork	Nominated

Metal Storm Awards

Year	Nominee / work	Award	Result
2023	Stone	Best Album Artwork	Nominated
