= Coliseum (album) =

- Original Level Plane (2004) cover art by guitarist/vocalist Ryan Patterson

Studio album by Coliseum
- Released: April 13, 2004
- Recorded: February 22 – April 5, 2004
- Genre: Hardcore punk
- Length: 27:14
- Label: Level Plane (LEV068)
- Producer: Jason Loewenstein

Coliseum chronology
Coliseum (2004)	Goddamage (2005)

Alternate cover
- Deathwish (2014) reissue cover art by John Dyer Baizley of Baroness

Coliseum is the debut studio album by the American rock band Coliseum. The album was released on April 13, 2004, through Level Plane Records. It was met with generally favorable reviews.

In 2014, Coliseum signed to Jacob Bannon of Converge's label Deathwish Inc., which previously released the band's 2009 single "True Quiet" / "Last Wave". Having been out of print on vinyl since 2006 after Level Plane went out of business, Deathwish will reissue Coliseum on August 19, 2014 — ten years after its original release. The updated version was remixed by Joel Grind of Toxic Holocaust, features updated artwork and packaging designed by Baroness' John Dyer Baizley and eight bonus tracks from the band's early years. Coliseum released a newly recorded music video in support of the reissue for the opening track "Detached," directed by Joe Watson.

== Track listing ==
=== Original release ===
All music composed by Coliseum.

1. "Detached" – 2:55
2. "Children of Our Own Creation" – 1:54
3. "Hostage of Privilege" – 1:50
4. "Burn out Bright" – 1:43
5. "F.F.P." – 1:12
6. "In Time" – 2:28
7. "This Mind Locked Inside This Body" – 2:56
8. "Mire" – 1:01
9. "Claim Control" – 1:41
10. "Give Up and Drive" – 2:33
11. "Pretty Situation" – 2:44
12. "The Simple Answer Is..." – 4:17

=== 2014 reissue bonus tracks ===
13. "No Salvation"
14. "Born to Hang"
15. "I Don't Care About You"
16. "Judy Is a Punk"
17. "Detached" (demo)
18. "This Mind" (demo)
19. "In Time" (demo)
20. "Pretty Situation" (demo)

== Personnel ==
=== Coliseum ===
- Tony Ash – guitar
- Keith Bryant – bass
- Matt Jaha – drums
- Ryan Patterson – guitar, vocals

=== Production ===
- Alan Douches – mastering
- Jason Loewenstein – engineer, mixing

=== Artwork ===
- James Case – photography
- Ryan Patterson – layout design
