= Anxiety's Kiss =

Studio album by Coliseum
- Released: May 5, 2015
- Genre: Hardcore punk, post-punk, industrial rock
- Length: 37:15
- Label: Deathwish (DW173)
- Producer: J. Robbins

Coliseum chronology
Sister Faith (2013)	Anxiety's Kiss (2015)

Anxiety's Kiss is the fifth studio album by the American rock band Coliseum. The album was released on May 5, 2015 through Deathwish Inc. Though Coliseum previously released the "True Quiet"/"Last Wave" single in 2009 and an expanded reissue of their debut album Coliseum in 2014 through Deathwish, Anxiety's Kiss is the band's first full-length album of new material released through the label. The album was produced by J. Robbins of Jawbox fame, who previously produced Coliseum's 2011 EP Parasites and 2013 studio album Sister Faith.

Sonically, Anxiety's Kiss sees the band incorporating more post-punk, industrial music and synthesizers into their post-hardcore sound. When asked how fans might react to Coliseum's new sound for Anxiety's Kiss, vocalist and guitarist Ryan Patterson said: "Every album changes and everybody is shocked at the time that happens, so I think that's made it difficult for us to really build a big fanbase because every time we put out a record—I don't know if it's alienating everybody—but it's completely erasing the rulebook."

To promote the album, coinciding with the album's announcement, Coliseum released a music video for the opening track "We Are the Water" directed by Max Moore. The announcement was followed by a short February/March 2015 tour, including dates with Old Man Gloom. Coliseum also released a music video for "Sunlight in a Snowstorm" and a lyric video for "Course Correction" before the album's official release date. The band's first tour directly in support of Anxiety's Kiss will be a June 2015 US tour with United Nations and Child Bite.

Timothy Monger of AllMusic gave the album four-out-of-five stars and said, "Building on the strong foundation of their last album, Anxiety's Kiss adds even more sonic and emotional variety to Coliseum's sound, and is easily their most interesting album to date."

== Track listing ==
1. "We Are the Water"
2. "Course Correction"
3. "Wrong/Goodbye"
4. "Drums & Amplifiers"
5. "Dark Light of Seduction"
6. "Sharp Fangs, Pale Flesh"
7. "Comedown"
8. "Sunlight in a Snowstorm"
9. "Driver at Dusk"
10. "Escape Yr Skull"

== Personnel ==
=== Coliseum ===
- Ryan Patterson – guitars, vocals
- Kayhan Vaziri – bass guitar
- Carter Wilson – drum kit
