= March to the Sea =

March to the Sea may refer to:

== A march or journey ==
- Salt March or Gandhi's march to the sea, 1930
- Sherman's March to the Sea during the American Civil War
- Race to the Sea during World War I

== Titles ==
- March to the Sea (novel), a novel by John Ringo and David Weber
- "March to the Sea", a song by Pelican from the album The Fire in Our Throats Will Beckon the Thaw
- "March to the Sea", a song by Twenty One Pilots from the album Twenty One Pilots
- "March to the Sea" (Baroness song), from the album Yellow & Green
