= Take My Bones Away =

Single by Baroness

from the album Yellow & Green
- Released: May 14, 2012
- Recorded: 2011
- Studio: Water Music; Hoboken, New Jersey; Elmwood Studio; Dallas, Texas
- Genre: Progressive metal
- Length: 4:59
- Label: Relapse
- Composers: John Dyer Baizley; Pete Adams; Allen Blickle
- Lyricist: John Dyer Baizley
- Producer: John Congleton

Baroness singles chronology
"A Horse Called Golgotha" (2010)	"Take My Bones Away" (2012)	"March to the Sea" (2012)

Music video
- "Take My Bones Away" on YouTube

"Take My Bones Away" is a song by American heavy metal band Baroness and the first single from the band's third studio album, Yellow & Green. The track was released digitally and on a 7-inch flexi disc included with the 63rd and 64th issues of the Austrian alternative music magazine Slam.

The single was the first from Baroness to appear on music charts, spending nine weeks on the Billboard Active Rock chart and four weeks on the Mainstream Rock chart. A music video was shot for the song over the course of one month during a spring tour with Meshuggah.

A live version of the song, performed in Maida Vale Studios for BBC Radio 1's Rock Show with Daniel P. Carter, was included on an extended play titled Live at Maida Vale.

== Reception ==
Jon Hadusek of Consequence called the track "a souring anthem that’s as poppy as it is metallic," saying, "Baroness crams a lot into the song’s five-minute runtime and somehow pulls it off." In his Yellow & Green review for Loudwire, Chuck Armstrong said "the band explodes into the first single, 'Take My Bones Away.' While this song is not necessarily representative of the sound of the entire record, it is probably one of the most accessible for long-time Baroness fans with its familiar sludgy sound." In a review for Last Rites, Dan Obstkrieg wrote, "[the song] is reasonably on par with the Baroness of yestertimes, [sic] though the guitars punch in ‘rock’ mode only, and the vocals remain a hair smoother than a bellow...the entire thing is so clearly constructed around that admittedly huge chorus vocal hook that, once it’s been digested, there’s little else to grab on to."

"Take My Bones Away" was named the "best metal song of the year" by iTunes.

== Track listing ==
Digital and flexi disc
No.	Title	Length
1.	"Take My Bones Away"	4:59

Promotional CD
No.	Title	Length
1.	"Take My Bones Away" (Radio edit)	3:23

== Charts ==
Chart (2012)	Peak position
US Active Rock (Billboard)	35
US Mainstream Rock (Billboard)	38

== Personnel ==
Baroness

- John Dyer Baizley – lead vocals, rhythm guitar, bass, keyboards
- Pete Adams – lead guitar, backing vocals
- Allen Blickle – drums, keyboards

Technical personnel

- John Congleton – production, engineering
- Sean Kelly – engineering
- John Colangelo – drum technician
- Alan Douches – mastering
