= Shock Me (Baroness song) =

- The vinyl cover

Single by Baroness

from the album Purple
- Released: November 15, 2015
- Recorded: 2015
- Studio: Tarbox Road Studios, Cassadaga, New York
- Genre: Progressive metal; sludge metal
- Length: 4:17
- Label: Abraxan Hymns
- Composers: John Dyer Baizley; Pete Adams; Nick Jost; Sebastian Thomson
- Lyricist: John Dyer Baizley
- Producers: Dave Fridmann; Baroness

Baroness singles chronology
"Chlorine & Wine" (2015)	"Shock Me" (2015)	"Try to Disappear" (2017)

Alternative cover
- The digital cover

Music video
- "Shock Me" on YouTube

"Shock Me" is a song by American heavy metal band Baroness. The second single off of their fourth studio album Purple, the track features elements of their traditional sludge metal sound, along with backing synthesizers to create a progressive rock aura.

The single was released digitally and on a 12-inch vinyl picture disc featuring artwork by Marald Van Haasteren. It was the band's third song to chart, spending ten weeks on the Billboard Mainstream Rock chart.

"Shock Me" finished as one of the four runners-up for the Grammy Award for Best Metal Performance at the 59th Annual Grammy Awards.

== Reception ==
Metal Injection said the track "is practically a pop song...but not in any 'sellout' sense. John Baizley reaches down and comes up with a winning vocal performance to match the band's most eminently catchy tune yet." In a review for Pitchfork, Brandon Stosuy wrote, "you'll notice a larger presence from the keyboards on 'Shock Me', but there's still plenty of grit. Opening with pensive keys and clean guitars, before swirling into a gritty rock anthem, it's an elegant song about being shocked into a new reality..." He went on to say, "this isn't dour or sad music: In fact, Baizley sounds thankful for the clearer, sharper vision personal tragedy's afforded him."

== Track listing ==
Digital and picture disc
No.	Title	Length
1.	"Shock Me"	4:17

Promotional CD
No.	Title	Length
1.	"Shock Me" (Radio edit)	3:47
2.	"Shock Me" (Album version)	4:17

== Charts ==
Chart (2015–16)	Peak position
US Mainstream Rock (Billboard)	28

== Accolades ==
Grammy Awards

Year	Nominee / work	Award	Result
2017	"Shock Me"	Grammy Award for Best Metal Performance	Nominated

== Personnel ==
Baroness

- John Dyer Baizley – lead vocals, rhythm guitar, synthesizers, lyrics
- Pete Adams – lead guitar, backing vocals
- Nick Jost – bass, piano, synthesizers
- Sebastian Thomson – drums

Technical personnel

- Dave Fridmann – production, engineering, mixing
- Mike Fridmann – engineering
- Greg Calbi – mastering
