= A Grey Sigh in a Flower Husk =

Studio album by Baroness and Unpersons
- Released: June 26, 2007
- Recorded: 2004–2005
- Studio: Jam Room Studio; Columbia, South Carolina
- Genre: Sludge metal; progressive metal; post-metal; post-hardcore
- Length: 34:43
- Label: At a Loss Recordings
- Producer: Phillip Cope (of Kylesa)

Baroness chronology
Second (2005)	A Grey Sigh in a Flower Husk (2007)	Red Album (2007)

Unpersons chronology
Live at The Jinx (2006)	A Grey Sigh in a Flower Husk (2007)

A Grey Sigh in a Flower Husk is a split album by American heavy metal bands Baroness and Unpersons. The album artwork, which was done by Baroness frontman John Baizley, was named MTV's "album cover of the week" upon the record's release.

== Background ==
Baroness and Unpersons were both based in Savannah, Georgia, and toured together during the mid-2000s. The bands recorded their material for A Grey Sigh in a Flower Husk at The Jam Room Studio in Columbia, South Carolina, with Kylesa guitarist and vocalist Phillip Cope producing the sessions. The Baroness songs were recorded in December 2005 and are the last to feature the band's original lead guitarist, Tim Loose. Loose had already parted ways with the group earlier that year but rejoined his former bandmates in the studio to perform the songs. The Unpersons songs were primarily recorded over a period of two days in the winter of 2004, and they are the final tracks the band ever released. Unpersons bassist Matt Maggioni would later go on to join Baroness, replacing Summer Welch by early 2012.

== Reception ==
Professional ratings
Review scores
Source	Rating
AllMusic	1.5/5 stars
Exclaim!	Positive
Scene Point Blank	7.5/10 stars

Chris Gramlich gave the album a positive review for Exclaim!, describing Baroness and Unpersons as "two of the underground's, and Savannah, GA's, brightest hopes." He called the split "a harbinger of the greatness to expect from both [bands]," and wrote, "while Baroness bring the heavy, Unpersons bring the gloriously weird." He concluded by saying, "The word is already out on Baroness, but hesitate on Unpersons at your peril." In a review for Scene Point Blank, staff writer Bob gave the album a 7.5/10 rating, saying "A Grey Sigh in a Flower Husk is an excellent record. My only real complaint is the brevity... What you do get is six excellent songs that showcase a multitude of aspects of the two bands." Chris Chellis reviewed the album for Last Rites, writing "It’s a little uneven, with Baroness offering a stronger listen, but Unpersons more than hold their own..." He praised the track "Cavité", declaring it "far and away the better song of the two Baroness contributes to the split." He complimented the guitar work, saying "The manner in which John Baizley and Tim Loose...play with the minimalist moments by throwing a few sharp, soulful riffs into the mix is akin to a chef peppering a slow-cooking soup with spices, each layer contributing an interesting flavor that strengthens the existing ingredients."

Erik Thomas of Teeth of the Divine had praise for the Baroness tracks, writing "I generally don’t enjoy [the] genre of stoner/sludge, but Baroness with their gruffer, sterner take on the genre has indeed piqued my attention with these two stellar offerings..." He was critical of the Unpersons songs, saying "while the music was acceptable in its often crazy structures and hazy hues, the vocals tend to put me off with their slightly spazzy delivery...I don’t see Unpersons as an act I’ll be looking out for or waiting for future releases like Baroness." Eduardo Rivadavia of AllMusic gave the album a 1.5/5 rating. Of the Baroness songs, he said, "[the] opener 'Teiresias'...supplies a promising glimpse of [Baroness'] impending debut full-length's controlled instrumental chaos, while the meandering, 12-minute 'Cavité' shows even greater range, but may lose a few listeners to distraction along the way." He wrote that Unpersons' style on the songs "Number" and "Dry Hand" "sounds rather compelling when backed by semi-distinctive riffs and melodies...but other [songs] can't shake an overall 'been there, done that' feeling of anachronism."

== Track listing ==
A Grey Sigh in a Flower Husk CD track listing

No.	Title	Artist	Length
1.	"Teiresias"	Baroness	6:21
2.	"Cavité"	Baroness	12:11
3.	"~ Un Cerceuil Flottant ~" / "Black Finnegan"	Unpersons	3:06
4.	"Number"	Unpersons	3:00
5.	"Dry Hand"	Unpersons	3:33
6.	"A Small Gesture, a Thousand Small Happy Gestures" / "[Shone in the Dust]"	Unpersons	6:32
Total length:			34:43

A Grey Sigh in a Flower Husk vinyl track listing

Side A
No.	Title	Artist	Length
1.	"Teiresias"	Baroness	6:21
2.	"Cavité"	Baroness	12:11
Total length:			18:32

Side B
No.	Title	Artist	Length
3.	"~ Un Cerceuil Flottant ~"	Unpersons	0:43
4.	"Black Finnegan"	Unpersons	2:23
5.	"Number"	Unpersons	3:00
6.	"Dry Hand"	Unpersons	3:33
7.	"A Small Gesture, a Thousand Small Happy Gestures"	Unpersons	4:26
8.	"[Shone in the Dust]"	Unpersons	2:06
Total length:			16:11

== Personnel ==
Baroness

- John Baizley – vocals, guitar, lyrics
- Tim Loose – guitar
- Summer Welch – bass
- Allen Blickle – drums

Unpersons

- Sanders Creasy – vocals, guitar
- Judson Abbott – guitar
- Matt Maggioni – bass
- Carl McGinley – drums

Technical personnel

- Phillip Cope – production
- Jay Matheson – engineering
- Steve Slavich – engineering
- John Golden – mastering
