= Red Album (Baroness album) =

Studio album by Baroness
- Released: September 4, 2007
- Recorded: March 18 – May 2, 2007
- Studios: Jam Room Studio; Columbia, South Carolina
- Genres: Progressive metal; sludge metal; post-metal
- Length: 56:31 (Note: Runtime includes 11:01 of silence at the beginning of track 11. Without the silence, the album has a runtime of 45:30.)
- Labels: Relapse; Hyperrealist
- Producer: Phillip Cope (of Kylesa)

Baroness chronology
A Grey Sigh in a Flower Husk (2007)	Red Album (2007)	Blue Record (2009)

Red Album is the debut studio album by American heavy metal band Baroness. It was released in 2007 by Relapse Records.

== Background ==
Red Album was recorded from March 18 to May 2, 2007, at the Jam Room Studio in Columbia, South Carolina. Like Baroness' earlier releases, the album was produced by Phillip Cope of Kylesa. It is Baroness' only studio recording to feature guitarist Brian Blickle, who departed the band in 2008.

== Release ==
In July 2007, Baroness posted the song "The Birthing" on their official Myspace page. "O'Appalachia" was released in August on a limited edition split 7" with High on Fire and Coliseum. A music video for "Wanderlust" debuted on December 8, 2007, on MTV's Headbangers Ball.

On September 4, 2007, Red Album was released by Relapse Records. The album is available on CD, vinyl, cassette tape, and as a music download. In 2008, Hyperrealist Records released a one-off pressing of Red Album on dark red vinyl with etched borders, which was limited to 1000 copies. All subsequent pressings were handled by Relapse Records. The first cassette copies were released in 2025.

== Reception ==
Professional ratings
Review scores
Source	Rating
About.com	4/5 stars
AllMusic	3.5/5 stars
Imperiumi	8.50/10 stars
Pitchfork Media	(8.4/10)
PopMatters	(8/10)
Scene Point Blank	7.9/10 stars
Spin	4/5 stars
Tiny Mix Tapes	4/5 stars

Red Album was well received by music critics. In a review for Pitchfork, Grayson Currin gave the album an 8.4/10 rating, saying, "Baroness offers a fully realized record that is more ambitious, more accomplished, and simply bigger than anything they've done before." In a review for About.com, Chad Bowar called it "an eclectic and epic album." He rated it four stars out of five, and wrote, "[Baroness'] combination of excellent musicianship, creative songwriting and willingness to experiment makes for a compelling and interesting CD."

Adrien Begrand of PopMatters gave Red Album an 8/10. He praised "Rays on Pinion", stating, "As an opening track, it’s phenomenal... Baroness’s music has become much warmer and melodic, yet the band’s visceral power remains fully intact." Scene Point Blank writer Bob gave the album a 7.9/10, and said, "Baroness effectively rewrite their place in the current musical maelstrom with this ten track monster...and set a new personal bar for themselves, as well as a new level of accomplishment." He called Red Album "a real good record and a highlight of the year," as well as "a huge leap forward for Baroness..." AllMusic's Greg Prato gave the album three and a half stars out of five, and said, "The Red Album shows that Baroness is one of a select number of acts that manage to be both mathematical and melodic at the same time."

=== Accolades ===
Heavy metal magazine Revolver named Red Album the top metal album of 2007. In 2017, Rolling Stone ranked it 83rd on their list of "The 100 Greatest Metal Albums of All Time." In 2018, Kerrang! named the album in their list of "The 13 Most Essential Sludge Records".

== Commercial performance ==
By November 2009, Red Album had moved 20,000 units.

== Track listing ==
All lyrics are written by John Dyer Baizley; all music is composed by Baroness.

Red Album track listing
No.	Title	Length
1.	"Rays on Pinion"	7:35
2.	"The Birthing"	5:03
3.	"Isak"	4:22
4.	"Wailing Wintry Wind"	5:54
5.	"Cockroach en Fleur"	1:50
6.	"Wanderlust"	4:29
7.	"Aleph"	4:21
8.	"Teeth of a Cogwheel"	2:16
9.	"O'Appalachia"	2:36
10.	"Grad"	5:54
11.	Untitled (contains 11:01 of silence followed by a hidden track)	12:11
Total length:		56:31

== Personnel ==
Baroness

- John Dyer Baizley – vocals, rhythm guitar, artwork
- Brian Blickle – lead guitar
- Summer Welch – bass
- Allen Blickle – drums

Guest

- Tony Roebuck – trumpet on "Grad"

Technical personnel

- Phillip Cope – production, engineering
- Jay Matheson – engineering
- Steve Slavich – engineering
- Scott Hull – mastering
