= First (Baroness EP) =

EP by Baroness
- Released: August 3, 2004
- Recorded: November 2003
- Studios: Jam Room Studio; Columbia, South Carolina
- Genres: Sludge metal; progressive metal
- Length: 16:57
- Label: Hyperrealist Records
- Producer: Phillip Cope (of Kylesa)

Baroness chronology
| Demo (2003) | First (2004) | Second (2005) |

First is the debut extended play by American heavy metal band Baroness. The artwork was done by Baroness frontman John Baizley.

== Background ==
Before Baroness was formed, much of the material that would appear on First was written by John Baizley and Pete Adams at a music store and later a small apartment in Savannah, Georgia. The band wrote First and Second over the course of a month and a half in the summer of 2003. "Tower Falls" was the first Baroness song written. Early recordings of "Tower Falls" and "Coeur" appeared on Baroness' self-released demo. The group started touring in the fall and gained the attention of Hyperrealist Records, who became interested in releasing the band's debut. First was recorded in November 2003 at The Jam Room Studio in Columbia, South Carolina, and produced by Kylesa's Phillip Cope. Pete Adams did not perform on the EP but became a member of the band in 2008.

== Release ==
First was released in 2004 on CD and on 12" vinyl by Hyperrealist Records. In 2008, the EP was remixed and remastered, and Hyperrealist reissued it along with Second as a compilation album titled First & Second.

== Reception ==
In a review of First & Second for AllMusic, Eduardo Rivadavia named "Tower Falls" and "Rise" among the tracks he found "particularly inventive and infectious," saying they "often excel during their softer passages..." In his review of Second for Scene Point Blank, staff writer Shane mentioned that "With the release of their first record, an EP titled First... some ears began to perk up and some eyes were opened." He went on to say, "If [Baroness'] first two records are any indication to what a full length might be, expect nothing but great things."

== Track listing ==
All music is composed by Baroness; lyrics by John Baizley.

First track listing
| No. | Title | Length |
|---|---|---|
| 1. | "Tower Falls" | 7:09 |
| 2. | "Coeur" | 3:18 |
| 3. | "Rise" | 6:30 |
| Total length: | | 16:57 |

== Personnel ==
Baroness

- John Baizley – vocals, guitar
- Tim Loose – guitar
- Summer Welch – bass, vocals
- Allen Blickle – drums

Technical personnel

- Phillip Cope – production, engineering
- Jay Matheson – engineering
- Steve Slavich – engineering
