= March to the Sea (Baroness song) =

Single by Baroness

from the album Yellow & Green
- Released: June 12, 2012
- Recorded: 2011
- Studio: Water Music; Hoboken, New Jersey; Elmwood Studio; Dallas, Texas
- Genre: Progressive rock
- Length: 3:11
- Label: Relapse
- Composer(s): John Dyer Baizley; Pete Adams; Allen Blickle
- Lyricist(s): John Dyer Baizley
- Producer(s): John Congleton

Baroness singles chronology
| "Take My Bones Away" (2012) | "March to the Sea" (2012) | "Chlorine & Wine" (2015) |

Music video
- "March to the Sea" on YouTube

"March to the Sea" is a song by American heavy metal band Baroness and the second single from the band's third studio album, Yellow & Green. The track received a digital retail release in June 2012. A promotional CD-R was distributed by the band's management company, Q Prime.

The song was the second from Baroness to appear on music charts, spending five weeks on the Billboard Active Rock chart. Much like the group's previous single, a music video was filmed in 2012 while the band was touring with Meshuggah. The video was directed by Jimmy Hubbard and released in January 2013.

A live version of the song, performed in Maida Vale Studios for BBC Radio 1's Rock Show with Daniel P. Carter, was included on an extended play titled Live at Maida Vale.

== Reception ==
Writing for Spin, Kory Grow said, "With soft breakdowns, a gang-vocal chorus and even a breakdown at the end that’s just drums and bass...[the song] shows the band at a point that’s almost ready for prime time." Ian Cohen of Pitchfork named it a "best new track," saying, "if 'March to the Sea' ends up dividing older fans, it's meant to unify new ones. What's really new for Baroness is that aching, minor chord melody running throughout and an explosive chorus..." In his review of Yellow & Green for Loudwire, Chuck Armstrong wrote, "The opening of 'March to the Sea' might be one of the most beautiful on Yellow & Green. With its clean and almost ethereal guitar sounds, it doesn't take long for the song to take you by surprise as it explodes into a percussive dream with [Allen] Blickle leading the charge on drums. Singer-guitarist John Baizley's vocals and lyrics add to this powerful track..."

== Track listing ==
Digital and promotional CD
| No. | Title | Length |
|---|---|---|
| 1. | "March to the Sea" | 3:11 |

== Charts ==
| Chart (2012) | Peak position |
|---|---|
| US Active Rock (Billboard) | 37 |

== Personnel ==
Baroness

- John Dyer Baizley – lead vocals, rhythm guitar, bass, keyboards
- Pete Adams – lead guitar, backing vocals
- Allen Blickle – drums, keyboards

Technical personnel

- John Congleton – production, engineering
- Sean Kelly – engineering
- John Colangelo – drum technician
- Alan Douches – mastering
