= Baroness (band) =

American heavy metal band

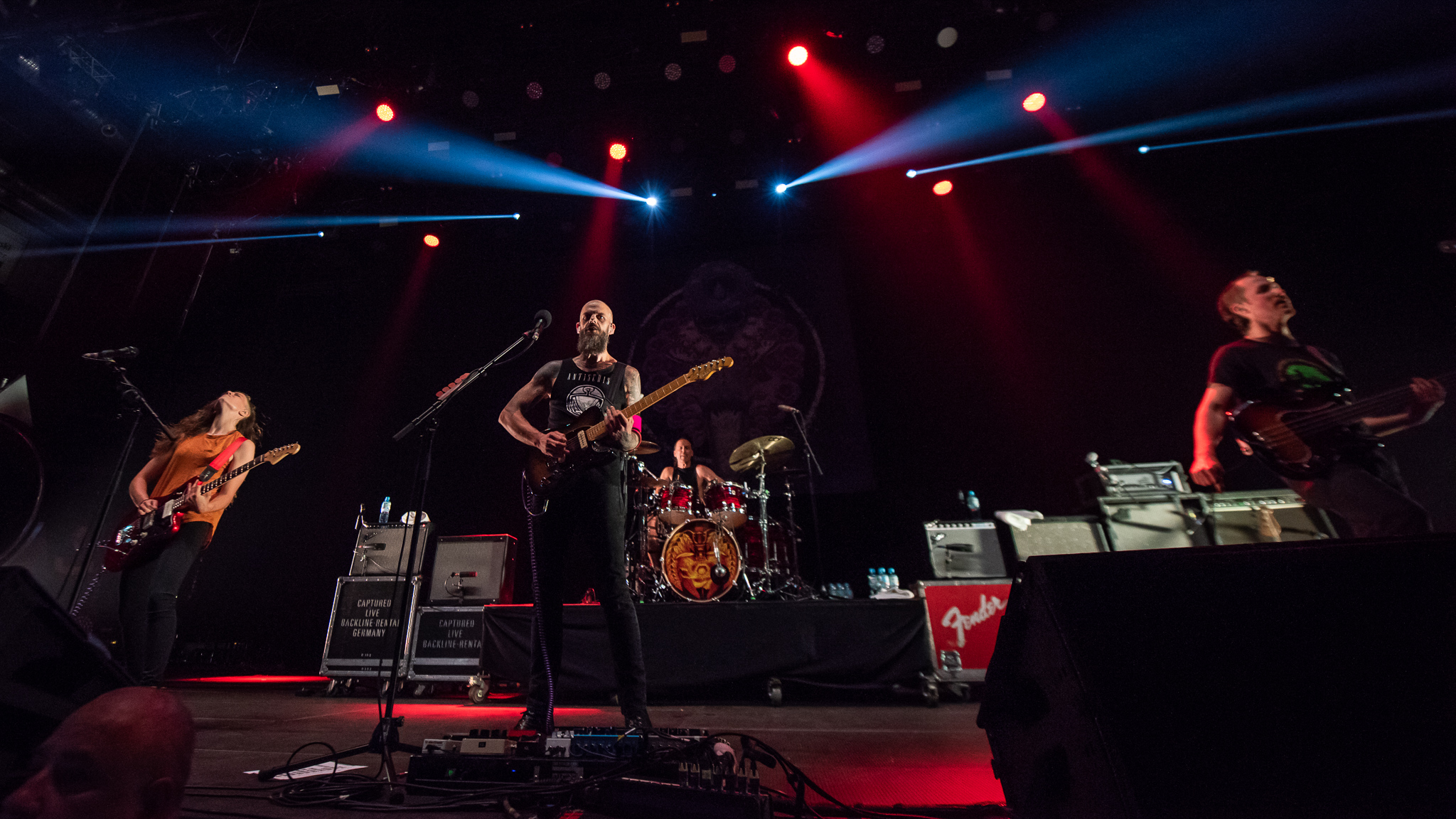
- Baroness in 2018

Background information
- Origin: Savannah, Georgia, U.S.
- Genres: Progressive metal; sludge metal; alternative metal; post-metal
- Works: Baroness discography
- Years active: 2003–present
- Labels: Abraxan Hymns; Relapse; At a Loss; Hyperrealist
- Members: John Baizley; Sebastian Thomson; Nick Jost; Gina Gleason
- Past members: Allen Blickle; Summer Welch; Tim Loose; Brian Blickle; Pete Adams; Matt Maggioni
- Website: yourbaroness.com

Baroness is an American heavy metal band from Savannah, Georgia that has been active since 2003. Its early members grew up together in Lexington, Virginia. The band has undergone numerous lineup changes, with frontman John Baizley serving as the sole constant throughout. Baizley creates the artwork for all of the group's albums and has done artwork for other bands.

== History ==
=== Formative years (2003–2007) ===
Baroness formed in the summer of 2003 in Savannah, Georgia. The original lineup consisted of guitarist and vocalist John Baizley, guitarist Tim Loose, bassist Summer Welch, and drummer Allen Blickle. Previously, John, Summer, Allen, and future-member Pete Adams had played together in a punk rock band called Johnny Welfare and the Paychecks. Much of the early Baroness material was written by John and Pete at a music store and later a small apartment in Savannah. "Tower Falls" was the first Baroness song written. Baroness' demo was recorded in September 2003 by Steve West of Marble Valley and self-released by the band that same year. They began touring in the fall and gained the attention of independent record label Hyperrealist Records.

The group's debut extended play was recorded in November at The Jam Room Studio in Columbia, South Carolina with Phillip Cope of Kylesa, who produced Baroness' early recording sessions. The EP, titled First, was released by Hyperrealist on August 3, 2004. The band recorded a follow-up EP, Second, which was released by Hyperrealist on September 5, 2005. That same year, Tim Loose was replaced on guitar by Brian Blickle (brother of drummer Allen Blickle). After touring Europe with the new lineup, Baroness reunited with Tim in the studio to record two final songs that would appear on a split album with fellow Savannah-based band Unpersons. The album, A Grey Sigh in a Flower Husk, was released by At a Loss Recordings on June 26, 2007.

=== Relapse Records and Red Album (2007–2009) ===
Baroness started recording their first studio album at The Jam Room with Phillip Cope in March 2007. It was announced shortly after that the group had signed with Relapse Records. The band's first release on the label was a split 7" record with High on Fire and Coliseum, to which Baroness contributed the song "O'Appalachia" from their upcoming album. Their debut full-length, Red Album, was released by Relapse on September 4, 2007. Hyperrealist also released a limited one-off pressing of the record on dark red vinyl with etched borders, of which there are 1000 copies. Red Album was met with positive reception, with Heavy metal magazine Revolver naming it the top album of the year.

On December 1, 2007, Baroness performed at New York City's Bowery Ballroom. The band's first music video (for the song "Wanderlust") debuted on December 8 on Headbangers Ball. Throughout the late 2000s, Baroness toured and shared the stage with many bands, including Converge, The Red Chord, High on Fire, Opeth, Coheed and Cambria, Coliseum, Mastodon, Minsk and Clutch. On September 20, 2008, the band announced that Brian Blickle had been replaced with guitarist and vocalist Pete Adams, who by that point was a member of Valkyrie. On October 5, 2008, Hyperrealist released First & Second, a compilation album of remixed and remastered versions of the songs from the first two Baroness EPs.

=== Blue Record (2009–2011) ===
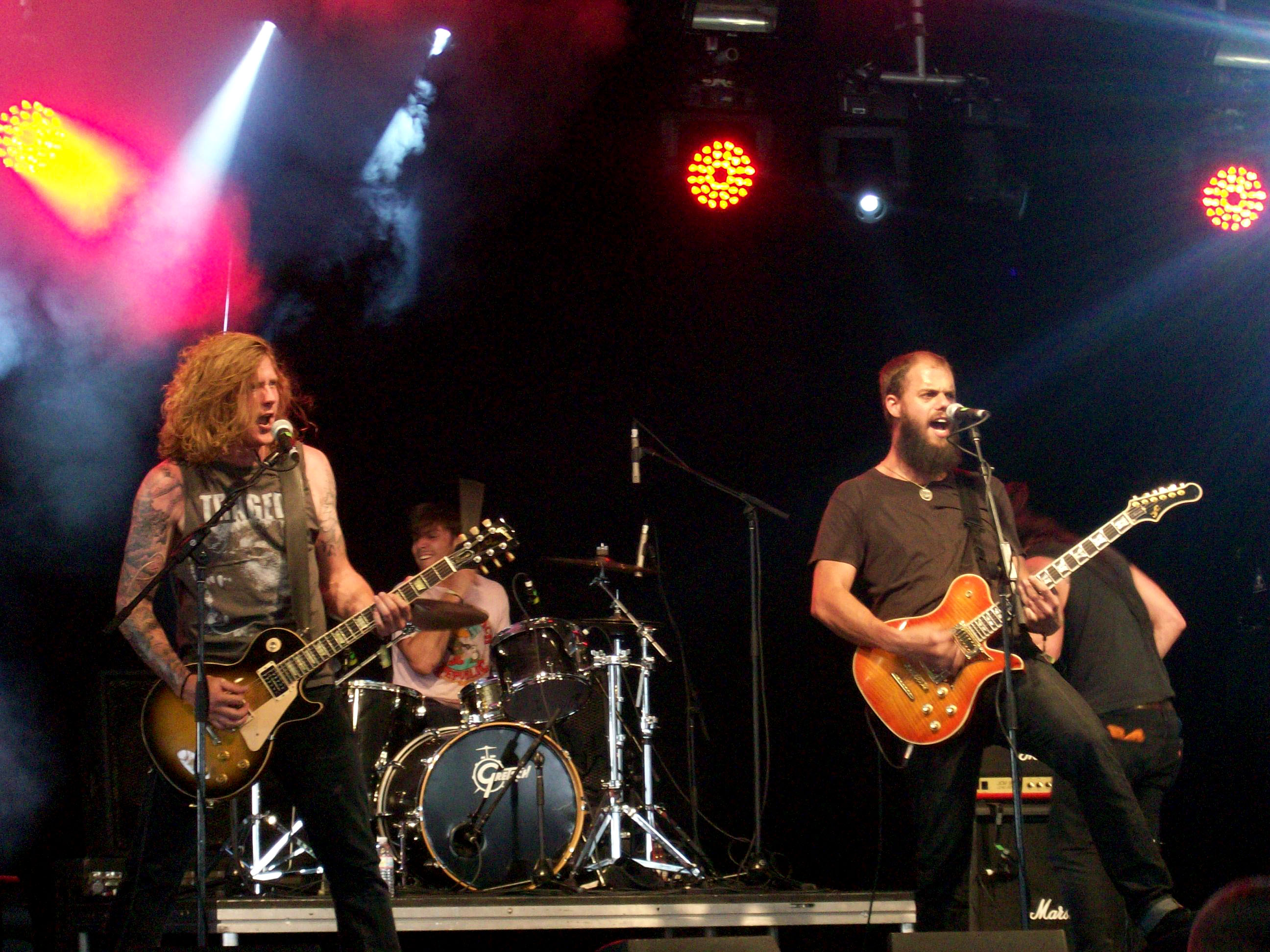
Baroness at Coachella Festival 2010

On April 23, 2009, Baroness performed at the Roadburn Festival in Tilburg, Netherlands. In May, they entered The Track Studio in Plano, Texas, to record their second full-length album. Produced by John Congleton, Blue Record was released via Relapse on October 13, 2009. Material from their Roadburn performance was included as a bonus disc on the deluxe edition of the album, while the Japanese release features a cover version of the Descendents song "Bikeage". Blue Record debuted at number 1 on the Billboard Heatseekers chart and reached 117 on the Billboard 200. It was named Decibel Magazine's top record of the year, and would later be named the 20th "Greatest Metal Album in History" by LA Weekly. Roughly six months after Blue Record was released, Baroness signed an agreement to be represented by Q Prime Management.

In February and March 2010, Baroness played at the Australian Soundwave Festival alongside bands such as Clutch, Isis, Meshuggah, Jane's Addiction and Faith No More. They toured Japan that March with Isis, supported Mastodon on their 2010 US headlining tour, and supported Deftones later that same year. On April 29, John Baizley and Pete Adams filled in for Mastodon guitarist Bill Kelliher when he was unable to perform due to illness. Baroness also performed at the Coachella and Bonnaroo festivals and was selected along with Lamb of God as a support act for Metallica on their late-2010 tour of Australia and New Zealand. Through Relapse, Baroness released its first single, "A Horse Called Golgotha," on August 31. The 7" record includes their cover of the Descendents song "Bikeage" as a B-side. By 2011, John Baizley had relocated from Savannah, Georgia to Philadelphia, Pennsylvania.

=== Yellow & Green and bus crash (2011–2013) ===
Baroness took a break from touring in 2011 to work on new material. The band launched a new website on May 23 and performed at Virginia's Best Friends Day festival in late August. Shortly after the festival, founding bassist Summer Welch left Baroness. They entered the studio as a three-piece and recorded their next album in November and December 2011. John Congleton again produced the record, while John Baizley performed the bass parts in addition to his usual guitar and vocal duties. In January 2012, former Unpersons bassist Matt Maggioni began working with Baroness as the band prepared for their next touring cycle. The new album's lead single, "Take My Bones Away," was released in May along with an album teaser. A second single, "March to the Sea," followed one month later. The double album Yellow & Green was released through Relapse on July 17, 2012. The album charted at 30 on the Billboard 200, the highest debut in Relapse Records' history, and it was named the top metal album of the year by both Entertainment Weekly and Spin. Just days before its release, the band performed songs from Yellow & Green live in Maida Vale Studios for BBC Radio 1's Rock Show with Daniel P. Carter.

While touring Europe on August 15, 2012, nine passengers were injured when the German-registered bus in which the band was traveling fell from a viaduct near Bath, England. Emergency services were called to Brassknocker Hill in Monkton Combe after the coach fell 30 ft (9m). Avon Fire and Rescue Service said the incident happened at 11:30 BST; because of heavy rain and reduced visibility, it was not possible for an air ambulance to land. Emergency services said two people were transported to Frenchay Hospital in Bristol while seven others went to the Royal United Hospital in Bath. As a result of the crash, frontman John Baizley suffered a broken arm and leg on his left side, while Allen Blickle and Matt Maggioni each suffered fractured vertebrae. Pete Adams was treated and released from the hospital the day after the accident. Baroness canceled their remaining tour dates while the other members spent months recovering from their injuries.

=== Recovery and line-up changes (2013–2015) ===
Not long after the accident, it became apparent that Matt Maggioni and Allen Blickle would not remain with Baroness. By early 2013, they were replaced by Trans Am drummer Sebastian Thomson and jazz bassist Nick Jost. Sebastian's first rehearsal with Baroness took place on January 20, while Nick's occurred on March 24. In January 2013, John Baizley joined Converge onstage in Philadelphia to perform their song "Coral Blue." The next day, John and Pete Adams opened for Neurosis as a stripped-down version of Baroness, playing a set of five reworked songs. John performed an acoustic set and artwork exhibition from March 14 to 16 at SXSW in Austin, Texas. In addition, Baroness made plans to perform at festivals such as Chaos in Tejas, Free Press Summer Festival, and Heavy MTL in Montreal, Quebec.

On March 25, 2013, a statement on Baroness' website officially announced that Matt Maggioni and Allen Blickle had left the group. This made John Baizley the sole remaining original member. A week later, the first leg of Baroness' 2013 US Headlining Tour was announced, as was the addition of Sebastian Thomson and Nick Jost to the band. The new lineup began a US tour in May and started a European tour in September. Live at Maida Vale, an EP consisting of audio from Baroness’ 2012 performance at Maida Vale Studios, became the group's final release through Relapse in July 2013. After nearly a year on the road, Baroness began writing a new album in early 2014. They also performed at that year's Soundwave Festival in Melbourne, Australia.

=== Abraxan Hymns and Purple (2015–2017) ===
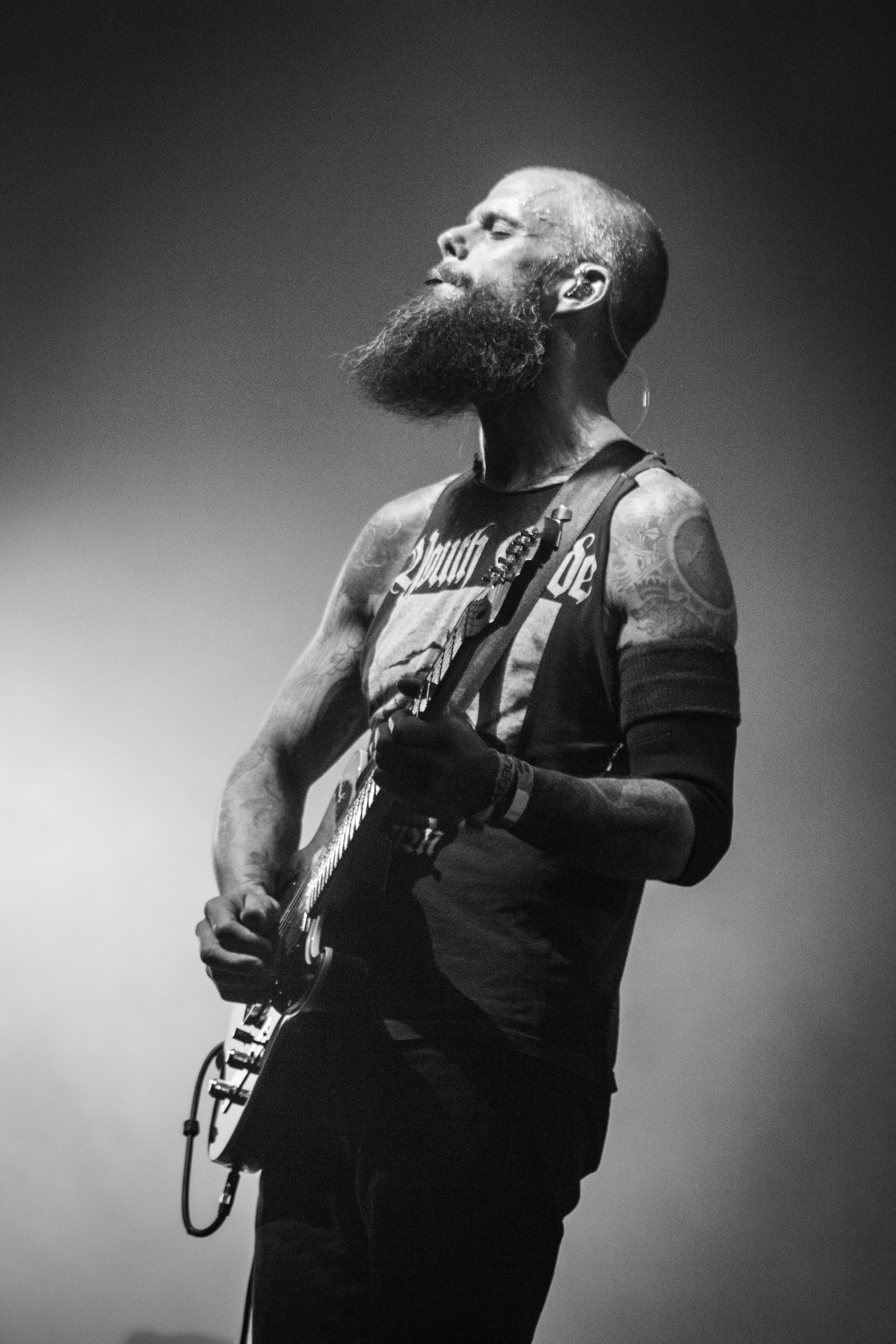
John Baizley at Roadburn Festival 2017

Baroness' fourth album, Purple, was recorded in 2015 with producer Dave Fridmann at Tarbox Road Studios in Cassadaga, New York. On August 28, 2015, Towards the end of a two-week European tour, "Chlorine & Wine" was released as the album's first single. The band also announced that Purple would be released on their own newly formed record label, Abraxan Hymns. On September 24, Baroness released the official music video for "Chlorine & Wine" and announced a North American small venue tour for the fall. On November 15, the band released the single "Shock Me", which debuted on BBC Radio 1's Rock Show with Daniel P. Carter. The song reached number 28 on the U.S. Mainstream Rock Tracks chart and was later nominated for the Grammy Award for Best Metal Performance at the 59th Annual Grammy Awards.

Purple was released through Abraxan Hymns on December 18, 2015. The album was included at number 23 on Rock Sound's Top 50 Releases of 2015 list and at number 7 on Rolling Stone's Best Metal Albums of 2015 list. It also peaked at number 2 on the Hard Rock Albums chart and topped the Independent Albums chart. Two more singles were released on December 12, 2017, and both feature alternate recordings as B-sides. "Try to Disappear" includes a live version of the song from a 2016 performance at Los Angeles's Fonda Theatre, while "Morningstar" features a demo version of the track. All four singles from Purple were released as 12" picture discs with illustrations by artist Marald Van Haasteren.

=== Gold & Grey (2017–2020) ===
On April 21, 2017, Baroness performed for the second time at the Roadburn Festival, for which John Baizley was the curator. On April 26, in an interview in Teamrock, Baizley said that they had begun writing material for their fifth studio album, stating: "We've started writing a few tunes that we're working on. The really cool thing now is that Sebastian and Nick have been in the band long enough that they understand what we do." On June 1, 2017, it was announced that Pete Adams had left the band to stay closer to home and focus on Valkyrie. His final concert with Baroness was the group's Roadburn Festival performance six weeks prior. Pete was replaced by guitarist and vocalist Gina Gleason, who had been rehearsing with the band since May.

In 2018, Baroness recorded their fifth album, Gold & Grey, with producer Dave Fridmann. On March 9, 2019, the band began teasing the new record. Three days later, they released the album art on their social media accounts, saying, "This painting was born from a deeply personal reflection on the past 12 years of this band's history, and will stand as the 6th and final piece in our chromatically-themed records." The tracks "Borderlines," "Seasons," and "Throw Me an Anchor" were all released as digital singles, and "Front Toward Enemy" debuted as part of Adult Swim's Metal Swim 2 compilation. After a K! Pit performance, the band released Gold & Grey via Abraxan Hymns on June 14, 2019. The album achieved a score of 91 on Metacritic with 14 reviews. It peaked at 5 on the Billboard's Top Album Sales chart, 2 on the Hard Rock Albums chart, 2 on the Vinyl Albums chart, and it topped the Independent Albums chart. To support the album, John Baizley and Gina Gleason peformed acoustic renditions of Baroness songs at independent record stores, and the band embarked on a summer tour.

=== Your Baroness Tour and Stone (2020–2025) ===
In a September 2020 interview with MetalSucks, Baizley noted that Baroness had written approximately 30 new songs for their sixth studio album. He said, "We started doing Zoom meetings every Monday night, and mostly that's because we've been writing since March or April. We're talking about new stuff we're doing, which is all file sharing, all trading elements of songs, and [we're] hoping when we get together that they congeal." By November, Baroness had begun recording their sixth studio album at a rented vacation home in Barryville, New York. On November 27, 2020, the band released the EP Live at Maida Vale – Vol. II through their label. The release includes songs from Gold & Grey which were recorded live in Maida Vale Studios the previous year. Originally an exclusive vinyl release for Record Store Day, it was later made available digitally.

In 2021, the band began the "Your Baroness" tour in North America. It was a by-request show, with fans voting on which songs they wanted to be performed. The tour continued into 2022, where they played shows in Europe and North America with bands such as Kvelertak, Mastodon, Killswitch Engage, and Lamb of God. On March 11, 2022, former Baroness guitarist Brian Blickle joined the band on stage to play "Isak" at The Golden Pony in Harrisonburg, Virginia. He joined them again to perform the song on June 22, 2024, at the Jefferson Theater in Charlottesville, Virginia.

In June 2023, the band officially announced their self-produced sixth album, Stone. They shared the album's lead single, "Last Word", and announced a North American tour with support acts including Sheer Mag, Jesus Piece, Portrayal of Guilt and Primitive Man. On July 14, the band unveiled the single "Beneath the Rose" and its corresponding music video. On August 18, the band released the third single "Shine". On September 15, 2023, Stone was released via Abraxan Hymns to positive reviews. The deluxe and Japanese editions of the album include bonus live tracks recorded during the "Your Baroness" tour. John Baizley and Gina Gleason performed a series of acoustic shows at independent record stores in September ahead of Baroness' North American tour.

=== Red & Blue Tour and new music (2025–present) ===
In February 2025, John Baizley stated that Baroness had begun writing a new album. The band also announced the "Red and Blue" North American tour, with plans to perform both Red Album and Blue Record in their entirety. After touring the East Coast of the U.S. in the spring, Baroness announced West Coast dates with Weedeater. On September 7, 2025, it was reported that Baroness' original drummer, Allen Blickle, had died at the age of 42. John Baizley confirmed the reports on the band's social media pages. In an April 2026 interview with Guitar World, Gina Gleason stated that the band is working on new music and has plans to enter the studio in the summer.

== Musical style ==
Baroness play a mix of heavy metal styles, including sludge, progressive, alternative, and post-metal. The band's third studio album,Yellow & Green, marked a shift away from their sludge roots towards a more accessible alternative rock sound. Pitchfork has described their sound as "rock music that folds in... more metal leanings, along with something more delicate and spare." Invisible Oranges called Baroness "a band of extremes" and said, "within a single record—sometimes a single song—they lash out in pummeling guitars and punk-rock screams, then drop into finger-picked acoustic guitar reminiscent of bluegrass and country. Their music fuses the meticulousness of prog-metal with the warm, lazy embrace of psychedelic rock."

== Members ==
Current members

- John Baizley – lead vocals, rhythm guitar, keyboards, percussion (2003–present); bass (2011)
- Sebastian Thomson – drums (2013–present)
- Nick Jost – bass, keyboards, additional backing vocals (2013–present)
- Gina Gleason – lead guitar, backing vocals (2017–present)

Former members

- Allen Blickle – drums (2003–2013); keyboards (2011); died 2025
- Summer Welch – bass, backing vocals (2003–2011)
- Tim Loose – lead guitar (2003–2005)
- Brian Blickle – lead guitar (2005–2008; guest in 2022 and 2024)
- Pete Adams – lead guitar, backing vocals (2008–2017)
- Matt Maggioni – bass (2012–2013)

Timeline

== Discography ==
Studio albums

- Red Album (2007)
- Blue Record (2009)
- Yellow & Green (2012)
- Purple (2015)
- Gold & Grey (2019)
- Stone (2023)

== Accolades ==
=== Awards and nominations ===
Grammy Awards

Year	Nominee / work	Award	Result
2017	"Shock Me"	Best Metal Performance	Nominated

Heavy Music Awards

Year	Nominee / work	Award	Result
2020	Gold & Grey	Best Album Artwork	Won
2024	Stone	Best Album Artwork	Nominated

Kerrang! Awards

Year	Nominee / work	Award	Result
2016	Purple	Best Album	Nominated

Loudwire Music Awards

Year	Nominee / work	Award	Result
2012	Yellow & Green	Rock Album of the Year	Nominated
2012	Baroness	Rock Band of the Year	Nominated
2012	"March to the Sea"	Rock Song of the Year	Nominated
2012	John Baizley	Rock Titan of the Year	Nominated
2016	Purple	Best Rock Album	Nominated

Metal Hammer Golden Gods Awards

Year	Nominee / work	Award	Result
2008	Red Album	Incoming! Best Band	Nominated

Metal Storm Awards

Year	Nominee / work	Award	Result
2009	Blue Record	Best Sludge / Stoner Metal Album	Won
2012	Yellow & Green	Best Sludge / Stoner Metal Album	Nominated
2015	Purple	Best Sludge / Stoner Metal Album	Nominated
2015	Purple	Best Album Artwork	Nominated
2019	Gold & Grey	Best Stoner Metal Album	Nominated
2019	Gold & Grey	Best Album Artwork	Nominated
2023	Stone	Best Album Artwork	Nominated

=== Year end lists ===
- Revolver named Red Album the top metal album of 2007
- Decibel named Blue Record the top album of 2009
- Entertainment Weekly and Spin named Yellow & Green the top metal album of 2012
