= Second (EP) =

EP by Baroness
- Released: September 5, 2005
- Recorded: January 2005
- Studios: Jam Room Studio; Columbia, South Carolina
- Genres: Sludge metal; progressive metal; post-metal
- Length: 20:20
- Label: Hyperrealist Records
- Producer: Phillip Cope (of Kylesa)

Baroness chronology
First (2004)	Second (2005)	A Grey Sigh in a Flower Husk (2007)

Second is the second extended play by American heavy metal band Baroness. The album artwork was done by Baroness frontman John Baizley.

== Background ==
Baroness wrote First and Second over the course of a month and a half in the summer of 2003. Second was recorded in January 2005 at The Jam Room Studio in Columbia, South Carolina, and produced by Kylesa's Phillip Cope. The EP flows as one continuous piece, and the instruments were recorded live in one take with no overdubbing.

== Release ==
Second was released in 2005 on CD and on 12" vinyl by Hyperrealist Records. Baroness began selling the EP in July while on tour. The A-side of the vinyl record contains all of the music while the B-side includes an etching of artwork by John Baizley. In 2008, the EP was remixed and remastered, and Hyperrealist reissued it along with First as a compilation album titled First & Second.

== Reception ==
Professional ratings
Review scores
Source	Rating
Scene Point Blank	8.5/10 stars

In a review for Scene Point Blank, staff writer Shane gave Second an 8.5/10 rating. He had high praise for the opening track, declaring it "one of the best songs of the year by any band." Although critical of "a couple strange transitions that feel a bit rushed," he wrote that the EP leaves the listener "wanting more." He concluded by saying, "Baroness are certainly a band on the move...If [their] first two records are any indication to what a full length might be, expect nothing but great things."

Andrew of Aversionline called Second a "nice chunk of work," saying, "it sounds extremely impressive... The drums [sound] perfect, and the guitars are nice and up front with a really surprising level of clarity to their overall texture. The basslines then fill things in nicely and generally play a pretty significant role, and the hoarsely shouted vocals are powerful without overpowering any of the instrumentation."

In a review of First & Second for AllMusic, Eduardo Rivadavia named "Red Sky" and "Vision" among the tracks he found "particularly inventive and infectious," saying they "often excel during their softer passages..."

== Track listing ==
All music is composed by Baroness; lyrics by John Baizley.

Second track listing
No.	Title	Length
1.	"Red Sky"	5:44
2.	"Son of Sun"	7:04
3.	"Vision"	7:32
Total length:		20:20

== Personnel ==
Baroness

- John Baizley – vocals, guitar
- Tim Loose – guitar, vocals
- Summer Welch – bass, vocals
- Allen Blickle – drums

Technical personnel

- Phillip Cope – production, engineering
- Jay Matheson – engineering
- Steve Slavich – engineering
- John Golden – mastering
