= Purple (Baroness album) =

Studio album by Baroness
- Released: December 18, 2015
- Recorded: March–May 2015
- Studios: Tarbox Road; Cassadaga, New York
- Genres: Progressive metal; sludge metal; hard rock; alternative rock
- Length: 42:33
- Label: Abraxan Hymns
- Producers: Baroness; Dave Fridmann

Baroness chronology
Live at Maida Vale (2013)	Purple (2015)	Gold & Grey (2019)

Singles from Purple
- 1. "Chlorine & Wine" Released: August 28, 2015; 2. "Shock Me" Released: November 15, 2015; 3. "Try to Disappear" Released: December 12, 2017; 4. "Morningstar" Released: December 12, 2017

Purple is the fourth studio album by American heavy metal band Baroness. It was released in 2015 through the band's record label, Abraxan Hymns.

== Background ==
Baroness began writing Purple in early 2014. The album was recorded and mixed by producer Dave Fridmann from March until May 2015 at Tarbox Road Studio in Cassadaga, New York. Purple is the first album from Baroness following their 2012 bus accident and the first to feature members Sebastian Thomson and Nick Jost. It is the last album to feature Pete Adams, who left the band in 2017.

== Release ==
Purple was released on December 18, 2015, through the band's newly founded record label, Abraxan Hymns. It is available on CD, vinyl, cassette tape, and as a music download. The cassette copies were a limited edition given away for free with the purchase of CD and LP editions of the album at participating stores.

Four singles were released from Purple as part of a series of 12" vinyl picture discs featuring illustrations by artist Marald Van Haasteren. The album's lead single, "Chlorine & Wine," was released on August 28, 2015. The second single, "Shock Me," was released on November 15 and later nominated for the Grammy Award for Best Metal Performance. The last two singles were released in December 2017, and each feature a B-side: "Try to Disappear" includes a live performance of the song that was recorded in 2016 at The Fonda Theatre in Los Angeles, while "Morningstar" includes a demo version of the track.

== Critical reception ==
Professional ratings
Aggregate scores
Source	Rating
AnyDecentMusic?	7.8/10
Metacritic	85/100
Review scores
Source	Rating
AllMusic	4/5 stars
The A.V. Club	B
Drowned in Sound	8/10
Exclaim!	9/10
The Guardian	4/5 stars
Metal Hammer	4.5/5 stars
Pitchfork	8.5/10
PopMatters	8/10
Rolling Stone Australia	4.5/5 stars
Spin	8/10

Purple was met with critical acclaim from music critics. At Metacritic (a review aggregator site which assigns a normalized rating out of 100 from music critics), based on 19 critics, the album received a score of 85/100, which indicates "universal acclaim".

In Dom Lawson's review of the album for The Guardian, he described the album as a "far more focused and fiery beast; both a return to the stormy riffing and skewed melodies of old and a subtle but unmistakable lunge for mainstream glory. It's a balance they pull off brilliantly." Pitchfork's Brandon Stosuy was likewise praising of the album, writing that "These are some of the biggest, strongest songs that Baroness has written; it's rock music that folds in their more metal leanings, along with something more delicate and spare. The hooks and melodies are their best." Addison Herron-Wheeler of Exclaim! said that "Purple has just as much energy and power as the group's older works, but with a more refined and mature sound." She declared the album a "must-hear," saying "Baroness are back, and they sound as good as ever."

Thom Jurek of AllMusic said, "Though not as 'experimental' as their previous couple of records, as a whole Purple is far more focused, and it's certainly more euphoric. Surviving a close brush with death resulted in a celebratory affirmation of life that equates physical bombast and rockist swagger with woozy, dreamy, rainbow-streaked beauty." In a review for Spin, Dan Weiss wrote "Whether the devastation of the [band's bus] accident has imbued Baizley with new life, or his dual successes in the arts are just making him a fuller person, somehow Purple is still heavier than Yellow & Green despite being a leaner machine" In Mike Diver's review of Purple for Drowned in Sound, he referred to the album as a "quite wonderful record," "a certifiable triumph," and "a beyond-commendable comeback."

== Commercial performance ==
Purple debuted at No. 70 on the Billboard 200 with nearly 17,500 sales in its first week. It peaked at No. 2 on Billboard's Hard Rock Albums chart and topped the Independent Albums chart. The album's second single, "Shock Me," reached number 28 on Billboard's Mainstream Rock chart.

== Track listing ==
All lyrics are written by John Dyer Baizley; all music is composed by Baroness.

Purple track listing
No.	Title	Length
1.	"Morningstar"	4:16
2.	"Shock Me"	4:17
3.	"Try to Disappear"	4:52
4.	"Kerosene"	5:10
5.	"Fugue"	2:34
6.	"Chlorine & Wine"	6:49
7.	"The Iron Bell"	4:24
8.	"Desperation Burns"	4:14
9.	"If I Have to Wake Up (Would You Stop the Rain?)"	5:41
10.	"Crossroads of Infinity"	0:16
Total length:		42:33

== Personnel ==
Baroness

- John Dyer Baizley – lead vocals, rhythm guitar, acoustic guitar, lyrics, bells, glockenspiel, Wurlitzer electric piano
- Pete Adams – lead guitar, acoustic guitar, backing vocals
- Nick Jost – bass, double bass, piano, synthesizers, additional backing vocals in "Chlorine & Wine"
- Sebastian Thomson – drums, additional backing vocals in "Chlorine & Wine"

Guest

- Isabela Dyer Thompson Baizley – spoken words on "Crossroads of Infinity"

Technical personnel

- Dave Fridmann – production, engineering, mixing
- Mike Fridmann – engineering
- Greg Calbi – mastering

== Charts ==
Chart (2015–16)	Peak position
Australian Albums (ARIA)	64
Canadian Albums (Billboard)	96
Belgian Albums (Ultratop Flanders)	91
Dutch Albums (Album Top 100)	75
German Albums (Offizielle Top 100)	64
Norwegian Albums (VG-lista)	36
Scottish Albums (Official Charts)	98
Swiss Albums (Schweizer Hitparade)	88
UK Independent Albums (Official Charts)	11
UK Rock & Metal Albums (Official Charts)	6
US Billboard 200	70
US Independent Albums (Billboard)	1
US Tastemaker Albums (Billboard)	3
US Top Album Sales (Billboard)	51
US Top Hard Rock Albums (Billboard)	2
US Top Rock Albums (Billboard)	5
US Vinyl Albums (Billboard)	8

== Accolades ==
Best-of lists

Publication	Country	Accolade	Year	Rank
L.A. Weekly	US	10 Best Heavy Metal Albums of 2015	2015	3
Loudwire	US	20 Best Rock Albums of 2015	2015	9
Metalholic	US	50 Best Hard Rock and Metal Albums of 2015	2015	5
New Noise	US	Top 50 Metal & Rock Albums of 2015	2015	4
Pitchfork	US	The Best Metal Albums of 2015	2015	6
Rock Sound	UK	Top 50 releases of 2015	2015	23
Rolling Stone	US	20 Best Metal Albums of 2015	2015	7

Grammy Awards

Year	Nominee / work	Award	Result
2017	"Shock Me"	Best Metal Performance	Nominated

Kerrang! Awards

Year	Nominee / work	Award	Result
2016	Purple	Best Album	Nominated

Loudwire Music Awards

Year	Nominee / work	Award	Result
2016	Purple	Best Rock Album	Nominated

Metal Storm Awards

Year	Nominee / work	Award	Result
2015	Purple	Best Sludge / Stoner Metal Album	Nominated
2015	Purple	Best Album Artwork	Nominated
