= Coliseum (band) =

American punk rock band

- Also known as: C.L.S.M.
- Origin: Louisville, Kentucky, US
- Genres: Hardcore punk, punk rock, post-hardcore, post-punk, noise rock
- Years active: 2003–2015, 2023–present
- Labels: Level Plane, Relapse, Temporary Residence, Deathwish, Equal Vision, Auxiliary
- Members: Ryan Patterson; Kayhan Vaziri; Carter Wilson
- Past members: Tony Ash; Keith Bryant; Matt Jaha; Mike Pascal; Chris Maggio
- Website: coliseumsoundsystem.com

Coliseum was an American punk rock band from Louisville, Kentucky, formed in 2003 by singer and guitarist Ryan Patterson, previously of Black Cross and The National Acrobat. The band was a cornerstone of Louisville's "Maximum Louisville" hardcore scene and over five studio albums evolved from D-beat-influenced hardcore punk to a more expansive sound incorporating post-punk, noise rock, and post-hardcore. In its 12-year run, the band played nearly 1,000 shows and released records on Level Plane, Relapse, Temporary Residence, and Deathwish Inc.

Coliseum went on indefinite hiatus in late 2015, after which Patterson formed the post-punk group Fotocrime, bassist Kayhan Vaziri continued with grind metal act Yautja, and drummer Carter Wilson fronted the slowcore band Null. An official breakup announcement was not made until 2017. In 2023, the three members reunited and released Infinity Shit under the abbreviated moniker C.L.S.M. on Equal Vision Records. Reunion shows and further activity under the Coliseum name followed in 2024.

== History ==
=== Formation and early years (2003–2006) ===
Ryan Patterson was born in Lexington, Kentucky, in 1977 and grew up in Elizabethtown. He became involved in the Louisville hardcore scene through bands such as Endpoint, and played guitar in The National Acrobat alongside his brother Evan Patterson. In 2001, the Patterson brothers formed Black Cross (initially Black Widows) with By The Grace Of God singer Rob Pennington; the band released its debut album Art Offensive on Equal Vision Records, produced by J. Robbins.

While Black Cross was on hiatus, Patterson formed Coliseum in 2003 with guitarist Tony Ash, bassist Keith Bryant, and drummer Matt Jaha, Patterson's cousin. The band cited Discharge, GBH, Motörhead, His Hero Is Gone, and Turbonegro as early influences. Their self-titled debut album was recorded by Jason Loewenstein of Sebadoh on half-inch eight-track tape at the BC Castle in Louisville and released in June 2004 on Level Plane Records. Coliseum began touring extensively, often alongside Louisville bands Breather Resist and Kodan Armada.

Ash departed after the debut, and the lineup shifted through several members as the band continued a relentless touring schedule. The group released split records with Louisville peers Lords and Young Widows, as well as a split with Doomriders on Level Plane, and the Goddamage EP in 2005.

=== No Salvation (2007–2009) ===
By 2007, Coliseum had settled into a power trio format with Patterson on guitar and vocals, Mike Pascal on bass, and new drummer Chris Maggio. Their second album, No Salvation, was produced by Kurt Ballou of Converge at Godcity Studios in Salem, Massachusetts, and released on Relapse Records. The album mixed hardcore ferocity with heavier, more technically proficient songwriting. Following the album's release, Coliseum toured extensively but ultimately asked to be released from their Relapse contract, feeling the larger label was not significantly changing their fortunes.

The band also released a split 7-inch with High on Fire and Baroness (2007) and the "True Quiet"/"Last Wave" single on Deathwish Inc. (2009) during this period.

=== House with a Curse and Temporary Residence (2010–2012) ===
After replacing Maggio with drummer Carter Wilson, Coliseum signed with Temporary Residence Limited, a label run by a Louisville native that also released Evan Patterson's Young Widows records. Their third album, House with a Curse (2010), was self-produced at The Funeral Home in Louisville and mixed by J. Robbins in Baltimore. It represented a significant departure, slowing the tempo and incorporating guest contributions from Bonnie "Prince" Billy, Robbins, Jason Noble of Rachel's and Rodan, and Peter Searcy of Squirrel Bait. The A.V. Club gave the album an A− rating, writing that the band had "realized just how far a little genre-bucking can go." Spin compared the result to "a more nuanced, impressionistic Fucked Up or Queens of the Stone Age." Exclaim! named it the No. 6 Punk Album of 2010.

The band released the Parasites EP (2011, produced by J. Robbins) and a split single with Superchunk on Temporary Residence the same year.

=== Sister Faith and Anxiety's Kiss (2013–2015) ===
Longtime bassist Mike Pascal was replaced by Kayhan Vaziri, a childhood friend of Carter Wilson, solidifying the lineup that would remain through the rest of the band's career. The fourth album, Sister Faith (2013), was produced by J. Robbins at his Magpie Cage studio and released on Temporary Residence. The album also featured guest contributions from Wata of Boris and John Baizley of Baroness. Baizley wrote that the band had "gracefully transitioned from the unrelenting anger, rage, and rawness of youth to a more thought-provoking, yet no-less-powerful or insightful sound." Punknews.org called it "clearly their punk record," highlighting its energy and the collision of hardcore and post-punk elements.

Coliseum's fifth album, Anxiety's Kiss (2015), was again produced by J. Robbins at the Magpie Cage and released on Deathwish Inc. The album marked the band's most pronounced stylistic shift, incorporating post-punk, industrial, and synthesizer elements and drawing comparisons to Killing Joke, Gang of Four, and Joy Division. PopMatters praised the album's "control, economy, and brevity," calling it "one of the most well conceived albums of the year so far." The album received mixed reviews elsewhere; MetalSucks found it had strayed too far from the band's heavier roots.

=== Breakup and solo projects (2015–2022) ===
Coliseum went on indefinite hiatus in late 2015 without a formal announcement. Patterson confirmed the breakup in April 2017 while introducing his new project, Fotocrime, a post-punk and dark wave group. Vaziri continued playing in the grind metal band Yautja, while Wilson fronted slowcore project Null. Original drummer Matt Jaha, Patterson's cousin, died in April 2020.

=== Reunion (2023–present) ===
The three members remained close following the hiatus. In 2021, Patterson began writing fast D-beat and skank beat hardcore demos and shared them with Vaziri and Wilson. The trio secretly recorded a new album, with Patterson tracking vocals, guitar, and bass at his House of Foto studio in Louisville; Wilson recorded drums remotely in Birmingham, Alabama; and the album was mixed by Jonah Falco at Fuzzbrain Studios in London. Released without advance notice on November 15, 2023, under the abbreviated moniker C.L.S.M. on Equal Vision Records and Patterson's own Auxiliary Records, Infinity Shit was described as a deliberate return to the band's early D-beat roots rather than a continuation of the post-punk direction of Anxiety's Kiss. The initial vinyl pressing sold out quickly.

In April 2024, Coliseum played their first shows in nine years at Planet of the Tapes in Louisville, with both nights selling out. Patterson told the crowd, "It never felt like it ended; it just felt like it stopped for a while." The band also released a new single, "You Might Be Dead," under the full Coliseum name. In late 2024, the band released a remixed and remastered 20th anniversary edition of their self-titled debut on Equal Vision and undertook a European tour.

== Musical style ==
Coliseum's sound evolved significantly over their career. Their early material drew heavily on 1980s British hardcore punk, particularly Discharge and GBH, as well as Motörhead, with a raw D-beat approach. With No Salvation (2007), produced by Kurt Ballou, the band incorporated heavier, more metallic elements while retaining a hardcore punk foundation. The Bandcamp Daily guide to Louisville post-hardcore noted that "having started as a metal-tinged hardcore-punk band that released records on Level Plane and Relapse, the prolific Coliseum morphed with age, eventually settling into a weathered and moodier sound that worked in principles of post-hardcore."

Beginning with House with a Curse (2010), the band slowed their tempos and incorporated more melodic and textural elements, drawing comparisons to Queens of the Stone Age and Fucked Up. By Sister Faith (2013) and especially Anxiety's Kiss (2015), the band had moved into territory influenced by post-punk groups such as Killing Joke, Gang of Four, and Joy Division, as well as Nick Cave and New Model Army. Patterson's vocal style similarly evolved from harsh screaming to a gruffer but more melodic baritone delivery.

The reunion album Infinity Shit (2023) represented a deliberate return to the band's early hardcore punk sound, with faster tempos and more aggressive riffs than their later work.

Producer J. Robbins of Jawbox and Burning Airlines became a key collaborator, mixing House with a Curse and producing both Sister Faith and Anxiety's Kiss. Patterson and Robbins had a longstanding relationship; Robbins had previously produced Patterson's earlier band Black Cross.

== Members ==
=== Current ===
- Ryan Patterson – vocals, guitar (2003–2015, 2023–present)
- Kayhan Vaziri – bass (2012–2015, 2023–present)
- Carter Wilson – drums (2009–2015, 2023–present)

=== Former ===
- Tony Ash – guitar (2003–2005)
- Keith Bryant – bass (2003–2005)
- Matt Jaha – drums (2003–2005; died 2020)
- Mike Pascal – bass (2005–2012)
- Chris Maggio – drums (2005–2009)

== Discography ==
=== Studio albums ===
- Coliseum (2004, Level Plane)
- No Salvation (2007, Relapse)
- House with a Curse (2010, Temporary Residence)
- Sister Faith (2013, Temporary Residence)
- Anxiety's Kiss (2015, Deathwish)
- C.L.S.M. Infinity Shit (2023, Equal Vision/Auxiliary)

=== EPs ===
- Demo (2004)
- Goddamage (2005, Manic Ride)
- Parasites EP (2011, Temporary Residence)
- Sister Chance EP (2013, No Idea)

=== Singles ===
- "True Quiet"/"Last Wave" (2009, Deathwish)
- "You Might Be Dead" (2024)

=== Splits ===
- Maximum Louisville Split Series Volume I (split with Lords) (2004, Auxiliary)
- Not of This World (split with Doomriders) (2005, Level Plane)
- Moral Damage (split with Lords) (2006, Destructure)
- Coliseum / Young Widows (split with Young Widows) (2006, Auxiliary / Relapse)
- Untitled EP (split with High on Fire and Baroness) (2007, Relapse)
- Superchunk / Coliseum (split with Superchunk) (2011, Temporary Residence)

=== Reissues ===
- Coliseum (20th Anniversary Edition) (2024, Equal Vision)

=== Music videos ===
- "Blind in One Eye" (2010)
- "Skeleton Smile" (2010)
- "One Last Night" (2012)
- "Black Magic Punks" (2013)
- "Bad Will" (2013)
- "Fuzzbang" (2013)
- "Love Under Will" (2013)
- "Doing Time" (2013)
- "We Are the Water" (2015)
- "Sunlight In A Snowstorm" (2015)
- "Dark Light Of Seduction" (2015)
- "Sharp Fangs, Pale Flesh" (2015)
