= Live at Maida Vale =

EP by Baroness
- Released: July 23, 2013
- Recorded: July 13, 2012
- Studio: Maida Vale Studios; Maida Vale, West London
- Genre: Sludge metal; indie rock; progressive metal
- Length: 19:18
- Label: Relapse

Baroness chronology
Yellow & Green (2012)	Live at Maida Vale (2013)	Purple (2015)

Live at Maida Vale is a live extended play by American heavy metal band Baroness. Released in July 2013, it reached No. 4 on the Billboard Vinyl Albums chart.

== Background ==
Days before Baroness released the double album Yellow & Green, the band performed songs from the record live in Maida Vale Studios for BBC Radio 1's Rock Show with Daniel P. Carter. This session resulted in Live at Maida Vale, which became the final material the group would release through Relapse Records. The EP was Baroness' last recording with founding drummer Allen Blickle and their only recording with bassist Matt Maggioni.

== Release ==
Live at Maida Vale was released as a digital download and received a limited edition one-off pressing on 12" vinyl via Relapse records. The A-side of the vinyl version contains all of the music while the B-side includes an etching of artwork by John Baizley. An online stream of the EP was made available by Alternative Press on the day of its release.

== Reception ==
Professional ratings
Aggregate scores
Source	Rating
Metacritic	76/100
Review scores
Source	Rating
Exclaim!	8/10
Kerrang!	4/5
Pitchfork	7.0/10
PopMatters	7/10

Live at Maida Vale earned positive reviews from music critics. At Metacritic (a review aggregator site which assigns a normalized rating out of 100 from music critics), based on 4 critics, the album received a score of 76/100, which indicates "generally favorable reviews".

Grayson Currin wrote a positive review for Pitchfork, saying "Amid last year’s dual hubbubs about their newly sharpened rock songs and their subsequent crash, Live at Maida Vale preserves the memory of the pugnacious, strapping quartet at the center of it all." Kerrang! called the release "an excellent appetizer for Baroness' return." In Greg Pratt's review for Exclaim!, he wrote "The crashing production and imperfections contrast nicely with the concise rock, creating a dangerous sound not often heard within the realm of such structured music." Writing for PopMatters, Matthew Fiander praised the EP, saying "This brief set crackles with energy and the songs in it are delivered with tight power."

== Track listing ==
All music is composed by Baroness.

Live at Maida Vale track listing
No.	Title	Length
1.	"Take My Bones Away"	5:19
2.	"March to the Sea"	3:40
3.	"Cocainium"	5:19
4.	"The Line Between"	5:00
Total length:		19:18

== Personnel ==
Baroness

- John Baizley – lead vocals, rhythm guitar, artwork
- Pete Adams – lead guitar, backing vocals
- Allen Blickle – drums
- Matt Maggioni – bass

Technical personnel

- Miti Adhikari – engineering
- Nick Fountain – engineering

== Charts ==
Chart (2013)	Peak position
US Vinyl Albums (Billboard)	4
