= The Golden Pony =

Restaurant in Virginia, USA

Coordinates: 38°27′04″N 78°52′06″W

The Golden Pony was a restaurant and live music venue located in Harrisonburg, Virginia, US. The Golden Pony was created in 2015 by Paul Somers and is frequented by students at James Madison University and Harrisonburg residents. Acts that have played at The Golden Pony include Cursive, White Reaper, The Callous Daoboys, and Black Tusk. The stage is 16 feet by 16 feet and that the venue has a capacity of 175 people.
