= Gold & Grey =

Studio album by Baroness
- Released: June 14, 2019
- Recorded: February–November 2018
- Studios: Tarbox Road; Cassadaga, New York
- Genres: Progressive metal; space rock; post-rock; psychedelic rock; hard rock
- Length: 60:29
- Label: Abraxan Hymns
- Producer: Dave Fridmann

Baroness chronology
Purple (2015)	Gold & Grey (2019)	Live at Maida Vale – Vol. II (2020)

Singles from Gold & Grey
- 1. "Borderlines" Released: March 14, 2019; 2. "Seasons" Released: April 10, 2019; 3. "Throw Me an Anchor" Released: May 15, 2019

Gold & Grey is the fifth studio album by American heavy metal band Baroness. It was released on June 14, 2019, on the band's own label, Abraxan Hymns.

== Background ==
The album is the band's first to feature new guitarist and vocalist Gina Gleason. It was produced by frequent Flaming Lips collaborator Dave Fridmann, who also produced Baroness' previous album.

"Our goal is, was, and will always be to write increasingly superior, more honest and compelling songs, and to develop a more unique and challenging sound. I'm sure we have just finished our best, most adventurous album to date. We dug incredibly deep, challenged ourselves and recorded a record I'm positive we could never again replicate. I consider myself incredibly fortunate to know Sebastian, Nick and Gina as both my bandmates and my friends. They have pushed me to become a better songwriter, musician and vocalist. We’re all extremely excited for this release, which includes quite a few 'firsts' for the band, and we're thrilled to be back on tour to play these psychotic songs for our fans. Expect some surprises."

— Baizley on the album

The band debuted the album's first single, "Borderlines," in Houston at the start of their co-headlining tour with Deafheaven in March 2019. "Seasons" and "Throw Me an Anchor" were released as singles in April and May, respectively. "Front Toward Enemy" debuted on May 3 as part of Adult Swim's Metal Swim 2 compilation. On June 7, Revolver released a live video of Baroness (sans Sebastian Thomson) performing an acoustic rendition of "Cold Blooded Angels" outdoors in the San Francisco Bay Area.

During a European tour in support of Gold & Grey, the band performed songs from the record live in Maida Vale Studios for BBC Radio 1's Rock Show with Daniel P. Carter. This session resulted in an extended play titled Live at Maida Vale – Vol. II, which released the following year.

== Album title and artwork ==
In an interview with Revolver, frontman John Baizley explained that the band members were calling the record Orange until the day before it was mastered. He was not fond of the title, and after noticing the phrase "gold and grey" in the album's lyrics, he settled on the Gold & Grey title.

As with the band's previous releases, the cover art was done by Baizley and echoes themes seen on prior recordings that prominently feature scantily clad woman intertwined with scenes inspired by nature. The art work was leaked by music identifying app Shazam which forced Baizley to release it early on the band's Twitter account.

"Here is the full cover painting for our new album, Gold & Grey. This is just the first piece of a much larger puzzle. Like the forthcoming album itself, it is the result of an intense, tireless, and psychotically convoluted creative process. This painting was born from a deeply personal reflection on the past 12 years of this band's history, and will stand as the 6th and final piece in our chromatically-themed records. I hope you all enjoy this album cover (sorry it's not called Orange). Don't look too closely, you might just see all the hidden elements."

— Baizley on the album's artwork

== Critical reception ==
Professional ratings
Aggregate scores
Source	Rating
AnyDecentMusic?	8.4/10
Metacritic	91/100
Review scores
Source	Rating
AllMusic	4.5/5 stars
Consequence of Sound	A
Exclaim!	9/10
The Guardian	4/5 stars
The Line of Best Fit	9.5/10
Mojo	4/5 stars
NME	5/5 stars
Pitchfork	8.0/10
PopMatters	9/10
Q	4/5 stars

Gold & Grey was widely praised by critics on release. At Metacritic, which assigns a normalized rating out of 100 to reviews from mainstream critics, the album received an average score of 91, based on 14 reviews, which indicates "universal acclaim". It is the third highest rated music release of 2019 on the site. Loudwire named it one of the 50 best rock albums of 2019.

== Commercial performance ==
Gold & Grey debuted at No. 39 on the Billboard 200 with roughly 13,000 sales in its first week. It peaked at No. 5 on the Top Album Sales chart, No. 2 on the Hard Rock Albums chart, No. 2 on the Vinyl Albums chart, and it topped the Independent Albums chart. The album also debuted atop the UK Rock & Metal Albums Chart, the highest chart position achieved by Baroness to date.

== Track listing ==
No.	Title	Length
1.	"Front Toward Enemy"	3:44
2.	"I'm Already Gone"	3:50
3.	"Seasons"	4:26
4.	"Sevens" (instrumental)	2:05
5.	"Tourniquet"	5:45
6.	"Anchor's Lament"	1:39
7.	"Throw Me an Anchor"	4:00
8.	"I'd Do Anything"	4:10
9.	"Blankets of Ash"	1:04
10.	"Emmett – Radiating Light"	4:12
11.	"Cold-Blooded Angels"	5:38
12.	"Crooked Mile" (instrumental)	0:41
13.	"Broken Halo"	4:24
14.	"Can Oscura" (instrumental)	2:01
15.	"Borderlines"	6:17
16.	"Assault on East Falls" (instrumental)	2:19
17.	"Pale Sun"	4:14
Total length:		60:29

== Personnel ==
Baroness

- John Dyer Baizley – lead vocals, rhythm guitar, glockenspiel, bells, piano, organ, synthesizer, artwork
- Gina Gleason – lead guitar, backing vocals, keyboards, synthesizer
- Nick Jost – bass, backing vocals, piano, electric piano, synthesizer, strings, bells
- Sebastian Thomson – drums, guitar

Guests

- Katie Jones – violin and viola on "Anchor's Lament"
- Jodi Milbert, Marald van Haasteren, Ben LaFond, Sara Schatz – spoken words on "Blankets of Ash"
- Isabela Dyer Thompson Baizley – vocals on "Cold-Blooded Angels"
- LMPD – megaphoning on "Borderlines"

Technical personnel

- Dave Fridmann – production, engineering, mixing
- Mike Fridmann – engineering
- Greg Calbi – mastering

== Charts ==
Chart (2019)	Peak position
Australian Albums (ARIA)	52
Austrian Albums (Ö3 Austria)	20
Belgian Albums (Ultratop Flanders)	40
Belgian Albums (Ultratop Wallonia)	124
Canadian Albums (Billboard)	72
French Albums (SNEP)	177
German Albums (Offizielle Top 100)	14
Scottish Albums (Official Charts)	35
Spanish Albums (PROMUSICAE)	57
Swiss Albums (Schweizer Hitparade)	32
UK Albums (Official Charts)	64
US Billboard 200	39

== Accolades ==
Best-of lists

Publication	Country	Accolade	Year	Rank
Decibel	US	Top 40 Albums of 2019	2019	30
Loudwire	US	Top 10 Rock Albums of 2019	2019	4
Metal Injection	US	Top 15 Albums of 2019	2019	2
PopMatters	US	70 Best Albums of 2019	2019	13
Revolver	US	25 Best Albums of 2019	2019	5
Thrillist	US	Best Albums of 2019	2019	9
Treble	US	Top 15 Albums of 2019	2019	4
Ultimate Guitar	US	20 Best Albums of 2019	2019	20

Heavy Music Awards

Year	Nominee / work	Award	Result
2020	Gold & Grey	Best Album Artwork	Won

Metal Storm Awards

Year	Nominee / work	Award	Result
2019	Gold & Grey	Best Stoner Metal Album	Nominated
2019	Gold & Grey	Best Album Artwork	Nominated
