= Yellow & Green (Baroness album) =

- Yellow cover

Studio album by Baroness
- Released: July 17, 2012
- Recorded: November–December 2011
- Studios: Water Music; Hoboken, New Jersey; Elmwood Studio; Dallas, Texas
- Genres: Progressive metal; indie rock; sludge metal
- Length: 74:59
- Label: Relapse
- Producer: John Congleton

Baroness chronology
Blue Record (2009)	Yellow & Green (2012)	Live at Maida Vale (2013)

Alternative cover
- Green cover

Singles from Yellow & Green
- 1. "Take My Bones Away" Released: May 14, 2012; 2. "March to the Sea" Released: June 12, 2012

Yellow & Green is the third studio album by American heavy metal band Baroness. The double album was released in 2012 by Relapse Records.

== Background ==
Baroness took a year off from touring in 2011 to write Yellow & Green. The album was recorded in November and December 2011 at Water Music in Hoboken, New Jersey, and Elmwood Studio in Dallas, Texas It is the second Baroness album produced by John Congleton, and the only album Baroness recorded as a trio, with frontman John Baizley playing all bass guitar parts due to the departure of the band's original bassist, Summer Welch. The album is the last full-length from Baroness to feature drummer Allen Blickle, who left the band after their 2012 bus accident.

Days before the Yellow & Green was released, the band performed songs from the record live in Maida Vale Studios for BBC Radio 1's Rock Show with Daniel P. Carter. This session resulted in an extended play titled Live at Maida Vale, which was the final Baroness release through Relapse in 2013.

== Release ==
On May 14, 2012, "Take My Bones Away" was revealed as the album's lead single on Baroness' official YouTube channel. The second single, "March to the Sea", was released on June 13. Jimmy Hubbard directed music videos for both songs using footage from the band's spring 2012 tour with Meshuggah. The song "Eula" debuted on Liquid Metal Sirius XM on June 18.

Yellow & Green was released on July 17, 2012 by Relapse Records. It is available on CD, vinyl, cassette tape, and as a music download. Relapse released a deluxe edition of the album housed in a 28-page hard covered book set featuring artwork from John Baizley. The first cassette copies of Yellow & Green were released in 2025.

== Reception ==
Professional ratings
Aggregate scores
Source	Rating
AnyDecentMusic?	7.4/10
Metacritic	82/100
Review scores
Source	Rating
AllMusic	4/5 stars
The A.V. Club	B−
Consequence of Sound	4/5 stars
Kerrang!	5/5 stars
NME	6/10
Paste	7.2/10
Pitchfork	8.5/10
PopMatters	9/10
Rolling Stone	3.5/5 stars
Spin	9/10

Yellow & Green was well received by music critics. At Metacritic (a review aggregator site which assigns a normalized rating out of 100 from music critics), based on 26 critics, the album received a score of 82/100, which indicates "universal acclaim". Entertainment Weekly and Spin both named Yellow & Green the top metal album of 2012.

In a review for Pitchfork, Brandon Stosuy gave Yellow & Green an 8.5/10 rating, calling it "an epic record that is heavy in a new way." He said the Yellow and Green discs "elegantly mirror each other," and stated, "Each disc stands on its own as a powerful document; together, they genuinely earn the word 'epic.'" Dean Brown of PopMatters gave the album a rating of 9/10, and wrote, "This release is the epitome of soul music, not in the musical sense of the word, but more in a literal sense..." He went on to say, "This double album may not connect with those unwilling to grow with Baroness, but for those willing to support a progressive band in their selfish exploration of their musical capabilities — give Yellow & Green enough time to bear its soul to you." In his review for Spin, Christopher Weingarten wrote, "On its own, the 40-minute Yellow is the second-best metal record to come from Georgia's drop-tuned, swamp-bathed, crust-caked community..." (behind Mastodon's Leviathan). He gave the album a 9/10 rating, saying, "On Yellow & Green, [Baroness] come out smarter and weirder and better than any metal band this year."

In J. Edward Keyes' review for Rolling Stone, he gave the album a score of 3.5/5, declaring it Baroness' "most accessible record." He said, "The edges are smoother and the choruses more pronounced than before, but they're still as marauding and feral as ever. The Yellow disc is more immediate... Green is artier, stretching filmy guitars across monk-like vocals. It adds up to a thrilling hard-rock epic." Writing for The A.V. Club, Ryan Reed gave Yellow & Green a B− rating. Although he noted that the record is "almost inevitably bloated," he said, "Yellow & Green is crammed with highlights... There's an abundance of good ideas here, all of them fearlessly pursued. Next time, the band just needs to hire an editor." Jon Hadusek of Consequence gave the album a B score, and said, "Baroness possesses an acute sense of melody, unpredictable songwriting, and vision for its work. Yellow & Green encapsulates all of those things, and, consequently, it's one of the year's most engaging metal albums."

== Commercial performance ==
Yellow & Green debuted at 30 on the US Billboard 200, selling 12,660 copies in its first week of release. It was the highest charting debut in the history of Relapse Records. By November 2015, Yellow & Green had sold 57,000 copies in the United States.

"Take My Bones Away" and "March to the Sea" both appeared on the Billboard Active Rock chart, peaking at 35 and 37, respectively. "Take My Bones Away" also reached 38 on the Billboard Mainstream Rock chart.

== Track listing ==
All lyrics are written by John Dyer Baizley; all music is composed by Baroness.

Disc 1 (Yellow)
No.	Title	Length
1.	"Yellow Theme"	1:44
2.	"Take My Bones Away"	4:59
3.	"March to the Sea"	3:11
4.	"Little Things"	5:03
5.	"Twinkler"	3:16
6.	"Cocainium"	5:08
7.	"Back Where I Belong"	6:15
8.	"Sea Lungs"	3:21
9.	"Eula"	6:47
Total length:		39:44

Disc 2 (Green)
No.	Title	Length
1.	"Green Theme"	4:22
2.	"Board Up the House"	4:33
3.	"Mtns. (The Crown & Anchor)"	4:17
4.	"Foolsong"	2:57
5.	"Collapse"	3:51
6.	"Psalms Alive"	4:08
7.	"Stretchmarker"	3:23
8.	"The Line Between"	5:02
9.	"If I Forget Thee, Lowcountry"	2:42
Total length:		35:15

== Personnel ==
Baroness

- John Dyer Baizley – lead vocals, rhythm guitar, bass, keyboards, artwork
- Pete Adams – lead guitar, backing vocals
- Allen Blickle – drums, keyboards

Technical personnel

- John Congleton – production, engineering
- Sean Kelly – engineering
- John Colangelo – drum technician
- Alan Douches – mastering

== Charts ==
Chart (2012)	Peak position
Austrian Albums (Ö3 Austria)	28
Belgian Albums (Ultratop Flanders)	59
Belgian Albums (Ultratop Wallonia)	124
Dutch Albums (Album Top 100)	52
Finnish Albums (Suomen virallinen lista)	22
German Albums (Offizielle Top 100)	13
Italian Albums (FIMI)	99
Scottish Albums (Official Charts)	87
Swiss Albums (Schweizer Hitparade)	66
UK Albums (Official Charts)	85
UK Independent Albums (Official Charts)	9
UK Rock & Metal Albums (Official Charts)	3
US Billboard 200	30
US Independent Albums (Billboard)	8
US Tastemaker Albums (Billboard)	3
US Top Hard Rock Albums (Billboard)	6
US Top Rock Albums (Billboard)	8
US Vinyl Albums (Billboard)	3

== Accolades ==
Best-of lists

Publication	Accolade	Rank
Entertainment Weekly	Six Best Metal Albums of 2012	1
Decibel	Top 40 Albums of 2012	2
Magnet	Top 25 Albums of 2012	12
BBC Music	Top 25 Albums of 2012	13
PopMatters	75 Best Albums of 2012	15
Spin	50 Best Albums of 2012	15
Treble	Top 50 Albums of 2012	16
Stereogum	Top 50 Albums of 2012	18
The Village Voice	Top 100 Albums of 2012	24
Paste	50 Best Albums of 2012	47

Loudwire Music Awards

Year	Nominee / work	Award	Result
2012	Yellow & Green	Rock Album of the Year	Nominated
2012	"March to the Sea"	Rock Song of the Year	Nominated

Metal Storm Awards

Year	Nominee / work	Award	Result
2012	Yellow & Green	Best Sludge / Stoner Metal Album	Nominated
