= Blue Record =

Studio album by Baroness
- Released: October 13, 2009
- Recorded: May–June 2009
- Studio: The Track Studio; Plano, Texas; Elmwood Studio; Dallas, Texas
- Genre: Progressive metal; sludge metal
- Length: 44:30
- Label: Relapse
- Producer: John Congleton

Baroness chronology
Red Album (2007)	Blue Record (2009)	Yellow & Green (2012)

Singles from Blue Record
- 1. "A Horse Called Golgotha" Released: August 31, 2010

Blue Record is the second studio album by American heavy metal band Baroness. It was released in 2009 by Relapse Records.

== Background ==
Baroness began writing Blue Record in 2007. The album was recorded in May and June of 2009 at The Track Studio in Plano, Texas, and Elmwood Studio in Dallas, Texas. It is the first Baroness album to feature guitarist Pete Adams and the first to be produced by John Congleton. It is the band's final studio recording to feature bassist Summer Welch before his departure in 2011.

== Release ==
Blue Record was released on October 13, 2009 by Relapse Records. It is available on CD, vinyl, cassette tape, and as a music download. The Japanese edition features a cover version of the Descendents song "Bikeage", which was recorded during same studio sessions as the album. A deluxe edition was released, and it includes a bonus disc with live audio from Baroness' performance at the 2009 Roadburn Festival. The first cassette copies of Blue Record were released in 2025.

On November 7, 2009, Baroness premiered a music video for the song "A Horse Called Golgotha". On August 31, 2010, Relapse released "A Horse Called Golgotha" as a 7" single. The single includes the Japanese bonus track "Bikeage" as a B-side. The song "Swollen and Halo" was included as part of the soundtrack to the 2010 video game MLB 10: The Show.

== Reception ==
Professional ratings
Aggregate scores
Source	Rating
Metacritic	87/100
Review scores
Source	Rating
AllMusic	5/5 stars
Alternative Press	4.5/5 stars
The Boston Phoenix	3/4 stars
Cokemachineglow	84%
Pitchfork	8.5/10
MetalSucks	4.5/5 stars
Mojo	4/5 stars
PopMatters	8/10
Rock Sound	9/10
Sputnikmusic	4.5/5

Blue Record was very well received by music critics. At Metacritic (a review aggregator site which assigns a normalized rating out of 100 from music critics), based on 8 critics, the album received a score of 87/100, which indicates "universal acclaim".

Phil Freeman of AllMusic gave the album a perfect five-star rating, saying, "Baroness has made a subtle but unmistakable evolutionary leap on [Blue Record], their second full-length and a clear companion piece to 2007's Red Album." He called Blue Record "a ferocious album that's not afraid to be genuinely beautiful." In a review for Rock Sound, Kevin Stuart-Panko wrote that "[Baroness'] range of dynamics has grown immensely," and "everything about 'Blue Album' sound larger-than-life." He rated the album 9/10. In Grayson Haver Currin's review for Pitchfork, he gave the album an 8.5/10 rating, and stated, "Every song bleeds into the other, and its flow is impeccable... Blue Record never feels overthought or overworked." He concluded by saying, "Complex enough to reward repetitive listening and compact enough to encourage it, Blue Record is one of the year's most generous hours." Cory S. of Scene Point Blank gave the album a rating of 8.4/10, calling it "more experimental, creative, and outgoing" than Red Album. He said that "Baroness have again created something great and unique with Blue Record and it's one of the strongest releases to come out of this year."

=== Accolades ===
Decibel magazine named Blue Record the top album of 2009. It was named "Best Sludge / Stoner Metal Album" at the 2009 Metal Storm Awards. In 2013, Blue Record was named the 20th Greatest Metal Album in History by LA Weekly.

== Commercial performance ==
Blue Record was Baroness' first release to appear on music charts. The album debuted at number 117 on the Billboard 200, selling 4,700 copies in its first week, which was the most of any metal release. It spent twelve weeks on the Billboard Heatseekers chart, where it debuted in the top position. It also appeared on Billboard's Tastemaker Albums, Independent Albums, and Top Hard Rock Albums charts.

== Track listing ==
All lyrics are written by John Dyer Baizley; all music is composed by Baroness.

Blue Record track listing
No.	Title	Length
1.	"Bullhead's Psalm"	1:20
2.	"The Sweetest Curse"	4:31
3.	"Jake Leg"	4:23
4.	"Steel That Sleeps the Eye"	2:38
5.	"Swollen and Halo"	6:35
6.	"Ogeechee Hymnal"	2:36
7.	"A Horse Called Golgotha"	5:21
8.	"O'er Hell and Hide"	4:22
9.	"War, Wisdom and Rhyme"	4:26
10.	"Blackpowder Orchard"	1:00
11.	"The Gnashing"	4:18
12.	"Bullhead's Lament"	3:00
Total length:		44:30

Japanese Edition bonus track
No.	Title	Length
13.	"Bikeage" (Descendents cover)	2:19

Deluxe Edition bonus tracks (Live at Roadburn Festival 2009)
No.	Title	Length
1.	"The Birthing" (Live)	8:56
2.	"Isak" (Live)	4:22
3.	"Rays on Pinion" (Live)	8:34
4.	"Wanderlust" (Live)	5:14
5.	"Grad" (Live)	7:22

Notes

- "The Birthing" (Live) includes a rendition of the Jimi Hendrix song "Machine Gun"

== Personnel ==
Baroness

- John Dyer Baizley – lead vocals, rhythm guitar, piano, artwork
- Pete Adams – lead guitar, backing vocals
- Summer Welch – bass
- Allen Blickle – drums

Technical personnel

- John Congleton – production, engineering, mixing
- Baroness – production
- Alan Douches – mastering

== Charts ==
Chart (2009)	Peak position
US Billboard 200	117
US Heatseekers Albums (Billboard)	1
US Independent Albums (Billboard)	14
US Tastemaker Albums (Billboard)	12
US Top Hard Rock Albums (Billboard)	15
