= Unpersons (band) =

American heavy metal band

- Origin: Savannah, Georgia, U.S.
- Genres: Sludge metal; post-hardcore; stoner metal; doom metal; noise rock
- Years active: 1997–2007
- Labels: At a Loss; Life Is Abuse; Born to Die; Fish Fur
- Past members: Sanders Creasy; Carl McGinley; Judson Abbott; Matt Maggioni; Andrew Fidler; Robert

Unpersons was an American heavy metal band from Savannah, Georgia. Active from 1997 until 2007, its members would go on to play in other notable bands that were involved in Savannah's heavy music scene.

== History ==
Unpersons was formed by guitarist Sanders Creasy and drummer Carl McGinley in 1997 in Savannah, Georgia. The band's name is a reference to George Orwell's dystopian novel 1984. Andrew Fidler was the group's original bassist and was 16 years old when they performed outside of Savannah for the first time. Unpersons began touring in 2000 and released a self-titled debut extended play through the Fish Fur and Born to Die record labels that December. It was around this time that the band's lineup stabilized after several early personnel changes. Unpersons released music through independent record labels in the 2000s and toured frequently, performing alongside bands such as Baroness, Black Cobra, Kylesa, and Weedeater.

Kylesa guitarist and vocalist Phillip Cope produced Unpersons' studio recordings, as he has done for Baroness and Black Tusk. Unpersons ultimately released two full-length albums, three extended plays (including a live EP), and a split album with Baroness. The split, titled A Grey Sigh in a Flower Husk, was issued in June 2007 and featured the final material Unpersons would ever release. In January 2015, the band's two full-lengths and their songs from the split were made available on Bandcamp to stream and purchase as a music downloads.

Several members of Unpersons would go on to play in other Savannah-based punk and metal bands. The group's original bassist, Andrew Fidler, is a founding member of Black Tusk and a part-owner of independent label Hyperrealist Records. Drummer Carl McGinley joined Kylesa in 2006, remaining with the band until it went on indefinite hiatus in 2016. Bassist Matt Maggioni played in the short-lived band Karst during the mid-2000s, and later in Baroness from 2012 to 2013.

== Musical style ==
Eduardo Rivadavia of AllMusic described Unpersons' style as a "gonzo brand of post-Jesus Lizard noise rock, topped with drunken, slurred vocals." Exclaim!'s Chris Gramlich said that "Unpersons are a gritty, dirty musical plague ravaging the listener," and called the band's sound "abrasive noise that recall the time when the Jesus Lizard were gods, but heavier, mixed with more aggression..." Last Rites writer Chris Chellis said, "I hear traces of everything from hardcore, stoner, doom and sludge in [Unpersons'] sound, with the latter being the most dominant of those four." Erik Thomas from Teeth of the Divine said the band's music was "experimental yet rooted in traditional stoner/sludge metal," with "furious drumming amid [an] off beat, angular, staggering, almost Mastodon-ish (and Kylesa) take on stoner rock." He described the vocals as having a "slightly spazzy delivery that verge on screamo/emo/nu grind quirkiness." In Music We Trust's Jeb Branin called Unpersons' music "disturbingly dark and sinister hardcore," and said, "Listening to it is like experiencing a mental breakdown though music."

== Members ==
Final lineup

- Sanders Creasy – guitar, vocals, samples
- Carl McGinley – drums, backing vocals
- Judson Abbott – guitar, vocals
- Matt Maggioni – bass, backing vocals

Early members

- Andrew Fidler – bass
- Robert – bass

== Discography ==
=== Studio albums ===
List of studio albums
Title	Album details
II	Released: August 2002; Label: Fish Fur / Born to Die; Formats: CD, DL
III	Released: May 25, 2003; Label: At a Loss; Formats: CD, DL

=== Split albums ===
List of split releases
Title	Album details
A Grey Sigh in a Flower Husk (with Baroness)	Released: June 26, 2007; Label: At a Loss; Formats: CD, LP, DL

=== Extended plays ===
List of extended plays
Title	EP details
Unpersons	Released: December 2000; Label: Fish Fur; Formats: 7"
IV: Self-Portrait	Released: June 2004; Label: Life Is Abuse; Formats: CD
Live at The Jinx	Released: 2006; Label: self-released; Formats: Cassette
