= Sebastian Thomson =

Drummer for Baroness, Trans Am, Publicist

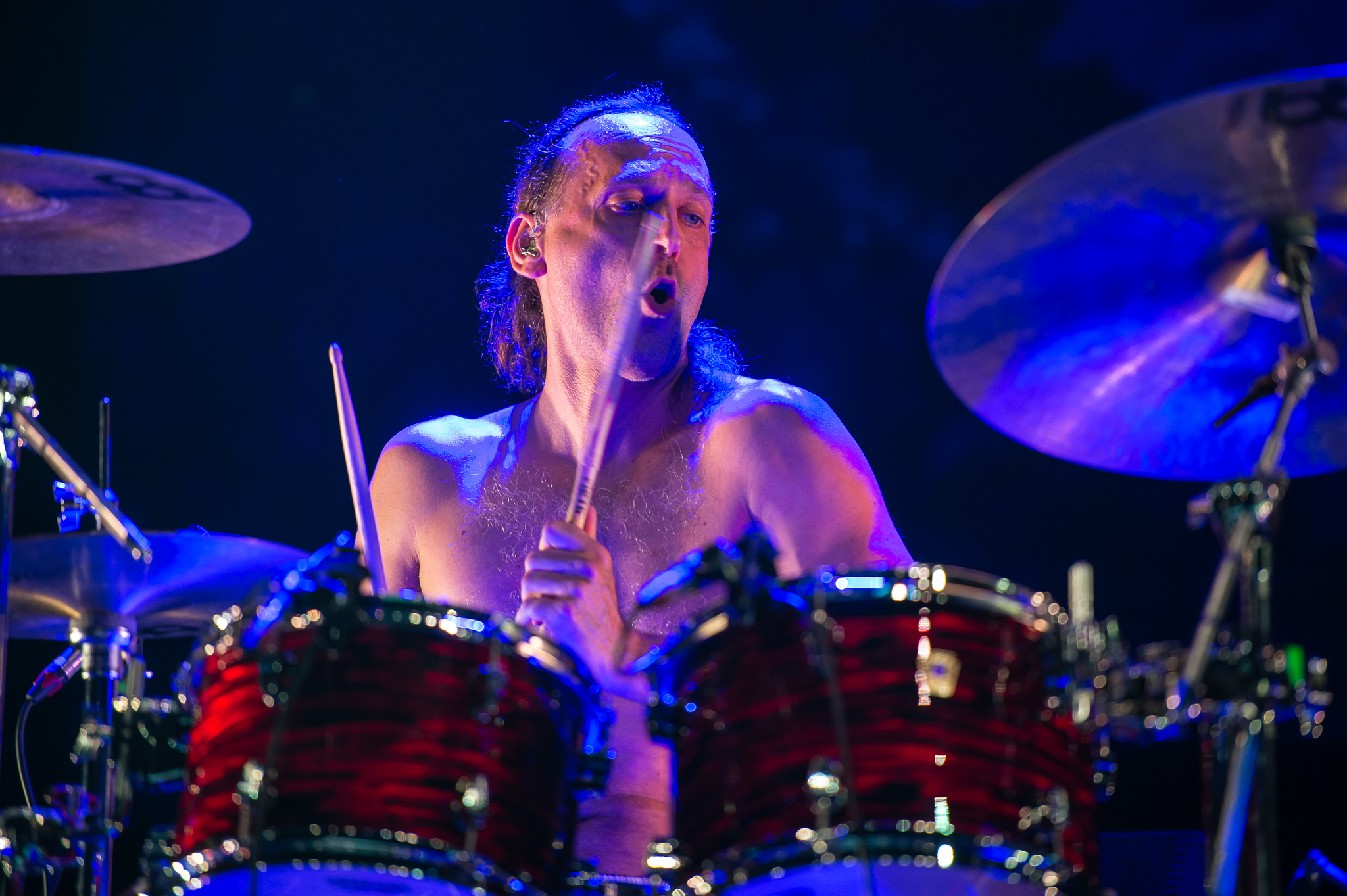
- Sebastian Thomson performing with Baroness at Rock im Park 2018

Background information
- Born: Chaco, Argentina
- Genres: Metal; electronic; post-rock
- Occupations: Musician, music producer
- Instruments: Drums, synth, vocals
- Years active: 1990–present

Sebastian Thomson is a Grammy-nominated musician based in Brooklyn, New York. He is currently the drummer for Baroness, Trans Am, and solo act Publicist.

== Early life ==
Thomson was born in Chaco, Argentina and spent his formative years in Argentina, Brazil, The Netherlands, France and the United States. He is left-handed. He got his start drumming while attending St. Andrew's Scots School in Argentina. Thomson attended Bard College and was pursuing a PhD in physics at the University of Maryland when he decided to focus on music full time.

== Career ==
Thomson's drumming career began in Washington, DC with the post-rock band Trans Am, formed with childhood friends Philip Manley and Nathan Means while the three were attending college. Trans Am continues to produce music although the members reside in separate cities.

More recently, Thomson is known for being the drummer of the heavy metal band Baroness. He joined the band in 2013 following a bus accident that resulted in the band's original drummer retiring. The first Baroness album featuring Thomson on drums was Purple, released in December 2015. The album's song "Shock Me" earned Thomson and his bandmates a nomination at the 59th Annual Grammy Awards. Thomson's second studio album with Baroness is Gold & Grey, released in June 2019. His third album with the band, Stone, was released in September 2023.

Additionally, Thomson maintains an active solo act, Publicist, in which he mixes live drumming with recorded tracks inspired by rock, acid house, electronic music and Detroit techno. When performing as Publicist, Thomson plays his drum kit in the middle of the dance floor, incorporating a synthesizer and vocoder.

Other past solo and collaborative works include The Frequency, Weird War, and The Fucking Champs.

Thomson's US national television debut took place May 20–23, 2019, when he served as the guest drummer for The 8G Band on Late Night with Seth Meyers.
