= John Dyer Baizley =

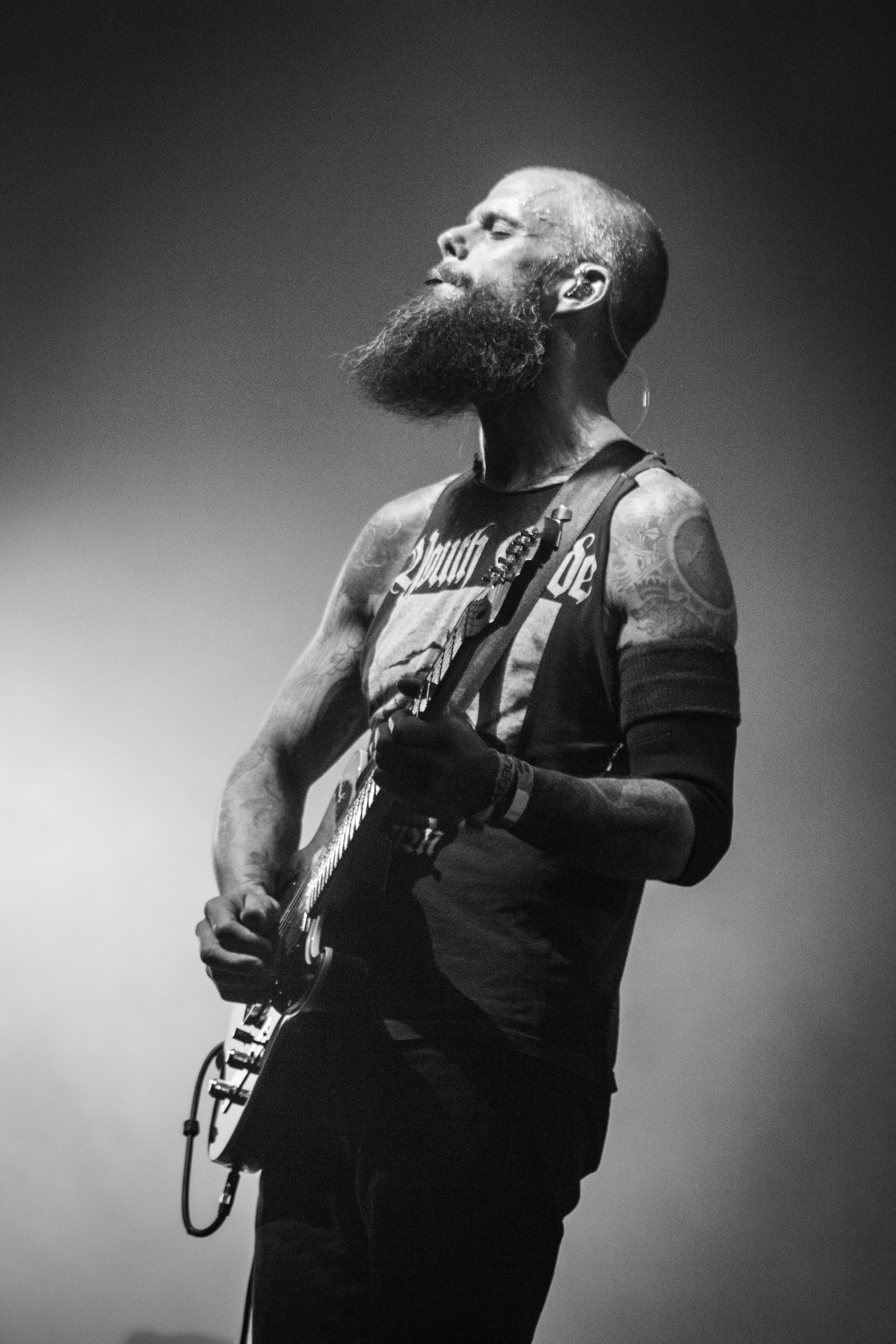
- Live with Baroness at Roadburn Festival, 2017

Background information
- Born: October 10, 1977 (age 48); Pittsburgh, Pennsylvania, U.S.
- Origin: Lexington, Virginia, U.S. Savannah, Georgia, U.S.
- Genres: Heavy metal
- Occupations: Musician, visual artist
- Instruments: Electric guitar, vocals
- Labels: Abraxan Hymns, Relapse, Hyperrealist
- Member of: Baroness

John Dyer Baizley (born October 10, 1977) is an American musician and painter most notable for being the lead vocalist and rhythm guitarist of heavy metal band Baroness, which formed in 2003 in Savannah, Georgia. He has been the sole constant member for the band throughout its run of more than two decades.

Baizley has achieved critical praise for his artworks, some of which have been incorporated into album art or T-shirts for artists such as Kvelertak, Kylesa, Pig Destroyer, Darkest Hour, Daughters, Skeletonwitch, Torche, Cursed, Black Tusk, Vitamin X, Flight of the Conchords, The Red Chord, Gillian Welch, Metallica, and his own band, Baroness.

== Discography ==
=== With Baroness ===
- Red Album (2007)
- Blue Record (2009)
- Yellow & Green (2012)
- Purple (2015)
- Gold & Grey (2019)
- Stone (2023)

=== With other artists ===
- Songs of Townes Van Zandt (2013)
- Me Moan (2013)
- Songs of Townes Van Zandt Vol. II (2014)
- You Will Never Be One of Us (2016)
- Defy Extinction (2022)

== See also ==
- Category:Albums with cover art by John Dyer Baizley
