= Dusty =

Dusty may refer to:

== Places in the United States ==
- Dusty, New Mexico, an unincorporated community
- Dusty, Washington, an unincorporated community
- Dusty Glacier, Washington

== People ==
- Dusty (given name)
- Dusty (nickname)
- Slim Dusty, Australian outback singer–songwriter born David Gordon Kirkpatrick (1927–2003)
- Dusty Drake, stage name of American country music singer-songwriter Dean Buffalini (born 1965)
- John 'Dusty' King (1909-1987), American singer and actor born Miller McLeod
- Dusty Springfield (1939–1999), stage name of English soul and pop singer Mary O'Brien
- Dusty the Klepto Kitty, a famous cat

== Arts and entertainment ==
=== Fictional characters ===
- Dusty (G.I. Joe)
- Dusty, the sidekick of Archie comics superhero "The Shield"
- Dusty, a singing cowboy in A Prairie Home Companion (film) (2006), Robert Altman's last film
- Dusty, a main character in British comedy film Dusty and Me
- Dusty Ayres, protagonist of American air-war pulp magazine Battle Birds
- Dusty Bates, titular character of British children's film series Dusty Bates
- Dusty Bin, mascot character from the UK gameshow 3-2-1
- Dusty Bottoms, a main character portrayed by Chevy Chase in American Western comedy film Three Amigos
- Dusty Chandler, a country music singer in the 1992 American film Pure Country, portrayed by George Strait
- Dusty Crophopper, protagonist in Disney's animated films Planes and Planes: Fire & Rescue
- Dusty, a young Australian Kelpie girl in Bluey and Rusty's sister
- Dusty Davies, a character in American disaster film Twister, portrayed by Philip Seymour Hoffman
- Dusty Donovan, on the American soap opera As the World Turns
- Dusty the Dusthole, a mascot for a 2003 Nevada Air Quality campaign
- Dusty Gozongas, a stripper who appears on the animated television series Aqua Teen Hunger Force
- Dusty Hayes, in the animated television series M.A.S.K.
- Dusty McHugh, on the British soap opera Family Affairs
- Dusty, a red hand saw who appears in Handy Manny
- Dusty, a fictional sandman by Ronald Sperling in Kidsongs: Good Night, Sleep Tight

=== Music ===
- Dusty – The Original Pop Diva, an Australian musical about Dusty Springfield
- Dusty (Dusty Springfield album), the 1964 US version of the debut album of singer Dusty Springfield
- Dusty – The Silver Collection, a 1988 compilation album by Dusty Springfield
- Dusty (Fred Eaglesmith album), 2004
- Dusty (Homeboy Sandman album)
- "Dusty", a song on the Ed Sheeran album -
- "Dusty", a song on the Soundgarden album Down on the Upside

=== Films ===
- Dusty (film), a 1983 Australian film
- Dusty, a 1983 TV film starring Nancy McKeon

== See also ==
- Dusti, a town in Tajikistan
- Dusti District, Tajikistan
- Dustie Waring (born 1985), American guitarist
- Dust (disambiguation)
