= Dusty Miller =

Dusty Miller may refer to:

== People ==
- Dusty Miller (1890s outfielder) (1868–1945), American professional baseball player primarily with the Cincinnati Reds
- Dusty Miller (1900s outfielder) (1876–1950), American professional baseball player with the Chicago Cubs
- Dusty Miller (mayor) (1929–2012), Canadian politician, mayor of Thunder Bay, Ontario
- Dusty Miller (martyr) (died 1945), British P.O.W. during the Second World War, crucified by a Japanese guard because of his faith
- Dusty Miller (Teamsters), a Teamsters union official
- Geoff Miller (born 1952), retired English international cricketer
- Graham Miller (RAF officer) (born 1951), retired senior Royal Air Force officer

== Plants ==
- Artemisia stelleriana, an Asian and North American species of plant in the sunflower family
- Centaurea cineraria, a small plant in the family Asteraceae native to the Island of Capraia
- Jacobaea maritima, formerly Senecio cineraria, a perennial shrub in the family Asteraceae native to the Mediterranean region
- Silene coronaria, a species of flowering plant in the family Caryophyllaceae native to Asia and Europe
- Spyridium parvifolium, a shrub in the family Rhamnaceae endemic to Australia
- Gonospermum ptarmiciflorum, formerly Tanacetum ptarmiciflorum, a perennial shrub in the family Asteraceae native to the Canary Islands
- A synonym for pinot Meunier, a variety of red wine grape, when grown in England
