= Dusty (nickname) =

Dusty is a nickname, sometimes of Dustin, which may refer to:

- Dusty Allen (born 1972), American former Major League Baseball player
- Dusty Anderson (1918–2007), American actress and model
- Dusty Baker (born 1949), American former Major League Baseball player and manager
- Dusty Bergman (born 1978), American former Major League Baseball pitcher
- Dusty Blair (1929–2010), Canadian ice hockey player
- Dusty Boggess (1904–1968), American Major League Baseball umpire
- Dusty Brooks (1911–1999), American actor and musician
- Dusty Brown (born 1982), American former Major League Baseball catcher
- Dusty Brown (1929–2016), American musician, electric blues harmonicist, singer, and songwriter
- Dusty Cohl (1929–2008), Canadian film producer and cofounder of Toronto International Film Festival
- Dusty Coleman (born 1987), American former Major League Baseball infielder
- Dusty Cooke (1907–1987), American Major League Baseball player
- Dusty Davis (born 1992), American stock car racing driver
- Dusty Decker (1911–1962), American former Negro League Baseball shortstop
- Dusty Dellinger (born 1973), American former Major League Baseball umpire
- Dusty DeStefano (1917–1982), American baseball and football coach, head coach of St. John's Red Storm
- Dusty Dornin (1912–1982), United States Navy officer and submarine commander
- Dusty Drake (born 1964), American country singer and songwriter
- Dusty Dvorak (born 1958), American former volleyball player
- Dusty Ellis (1953–2012), American former plant-worker turned activist and nuclear whistleblower
- Dusty Fahrnow (1903–1981), American racing driver
- Dusty Farnum (1874–1929), American stage and silent film actor, singer, and dancer
- Dusty Flanagan, Irish former association football (soccer) player
- Dusty Fletcher (1897–1954), African-American vaudeville performer
- Dustin Fletcher (born 1975), former Australian rules footballer
- Kyle Foggo (born 1954), US former CIA executive convicted of fraud
- Dusty Grave, American musician, member of psychobilly horror punk group Stellar Corpses
- Dusty Hare (born 1952), England rugby union footballer
- Dusty Harrison (born 1994), American boxer
- Dusty Hill (1949–2021), bassist and co-vocalist with the American rock group ZZ Top
- Dusty Hudock (born 1972), American retired soccer player
- Dusty Hughes (baseball) (born 1982), American former Major League Baseball pitcher
- Dusty Johnson (born 1976), American politician
- Dusty Mangum (born 1983), American football player, former placekicker for the Texas Longhorns
- Dustin Martin (born 1990), Australian rules footballer
- Dusty Miller (disambiguation)
- Dusty Ray Bottoms (born 1987), American drag performer
- Dusty Redmon (born 1983), American guitarist
- Bob Rhoads (1879–1967), American Major League Baseball pitcher
- Dusty Rhodes (disambiguation)
- Barbara Roads (born 1928), American labor activist and flight attendant
- Dusty Sklar (born 1928), American author and researcher
- Dusty Slay (born 1982), American comedian
- Dusty Spittle (1929–2018), New Zealand country singer and songwriter
- Dusty Springfield (1939–1999), British singer
- Dusty Street (1946–2023), American disc jockey
- Dusty Wathan (born 1973), American baseball coach and former Major League Baseball catcher
- Dusty Watson, American drummer
- Dusty Wolfe (born 1962), American professional wrestler
- Dusty Wright (born 1957), American musician, producer, and writer
- Dusty Zeigler (born 1973), American former National Football League player

== See also ==
- Dusty (given name)
