= Dust (disambiguation) =

Dust consists of fine, solid particles of matter borne in the air settling onto surfaces.

Dust may also refer to:

== Film ==
- Dust (1916 film), a 1916 American film by Edward Sloman
- Dust (1985 film), a film based on J. M. Coetzee's In the Heart of the Country
- Dust (2001 film) or Прашина, a film directed by Milčo Mančevski
- Dust or Toz, a 2005 Turkish film
- Dust (2005 film) or Пыль, a Russian film by Serguei Loban
- Dust (2009 film), a film by Max Jacoby
- Dust (2012 film), a Guatemalan film
- Dust (2026 film), a drama film directed by Anke Blondé

== Literature ==
- Dust (novel), a 2013 novel by Patricia Cornwell
- Dust (character), a character in the X-Men franchise
- Dust (His Dark Materials), a fictional form of matter in Philip Pullman's His Dark Materials
- Dust, a novel in the Jacob's Ladder Trilogy by Elizabeth Bear
- Dust, a 2007 novel by Martha Grimes
- Dust, a 2013 novel in the Silo series by Hugh Howey
- Dust, a 1998 novel by Charles R. Pellegrino
- Dust, a 2001 novel by Arthur Slade
- Dust, a comic book series from Image Comics
- "Dust", a poem by Rupert Brooke

== Music ==
- Dust (band), a 1970s hard rock group

=== Albums ===
- Dust (Ben Monder album) (1997)
- Dust (Benjy Davis Project album) (2007)
- Dust (DJ Muggs album) (2003)
- Dust (Dust album) (1971)
- Dust (Ellen Allien album) (2010)
- Dust (Laurel Halo album) (2017)
- Dust (Peatbog Faeries album) (2011)
- Dust (Peter Murphy album) (2002)
- Dust (Screaming Trees album) (1996)
- Dust (Tremonti album) (2016)

=== Songs ===
- "Dust" (Drake song)
- "Dust" (Eli Young Band song)
- "Dust" (Royworld song)
- "Dust", a 2008 song by Bic Runga from Try to Remember Everything
- "Dust", a 2004 song by Van Hunt from Van Hunt
- "Dust", a 2013 song by Gen Hoshino from the single "Gag"

== Science and technology ==
- Dust solution, a type of exact solution in general relativity
- Asian dust, meteorological phenomenon from East Asia
- Cantor dust, a zero-measure 2D fractal
- Cosmic dust or interstellar dust, in intergalactic clouds
- Mineral dust, atmospheric aerosols of mineral origin
- Smartdust, miniaturized wireless sensor networks
  - Neural dust, proposed application of smartdust as a brain-computer interface

== Television ==
- "Dust" (The Twilight Zone), a 1961 episode of The Twilight Zone
- "Dust" (Sliders), a 2000 episode of Sliders
- Dust, a magical element used in the RWBY web series
- Dust, a science fiction label for Gunpowder & Sky Studios; see Kyle Higgins

== Video games ==
- Dust: A Tale of the Wired West, a 1995 PC adventure game
- Dust: An Elysian Tail, a 2012 video game
- Dust 514, an MMO/FPS console game developed by CCP
- Dust II, a video game level map in the online multiplayer first-person shooter Counter-Strike

== Other uses ==
- Dust, a 2014 play by Suzie Miller
- Dust (ballet), a 2014 contemporary ballet choreographed by Akram Khan
- DUST (streaming service), a sci-fi streaming service owned by Gunpowder & Sky
- Dust Networks, a US company specializing in the design and manufacture of wireless sensor networks
- Fannings or dust, the lowest possible grade of tea

== See also ==
- Angel dust, a name for phencyclidine
- Bed skirt, a decorative piece used to cover the boxspring and legs of the bed known in North America as dust ruffle
- Dustiness
- Dust to Dust (disambiguation)
- Dusted (disambiguation)
- Dustin (disambiguation)
- Dusting (disambiguation)
- Dusty (disambiguation)
