= Dusting =

Dusting may refer to:

- A form of housekeeping involving the removal of dust
- Any act of clearing away dust from a surface
- Crop dusting, the aerial application of fertilizers, pesticides, etc.
- Dusting attack, an attack on a cryptocurrency wallet
- Using fingerprint powder to dust for fingerprints
- "Dusting", a colloquial term for using pressurized dust-clearing spray as an intoxicative inhalant

== See also ==
- Dust (disambiguation)
- Dusted (disambiguation)
- Dustin (disambiguation)
