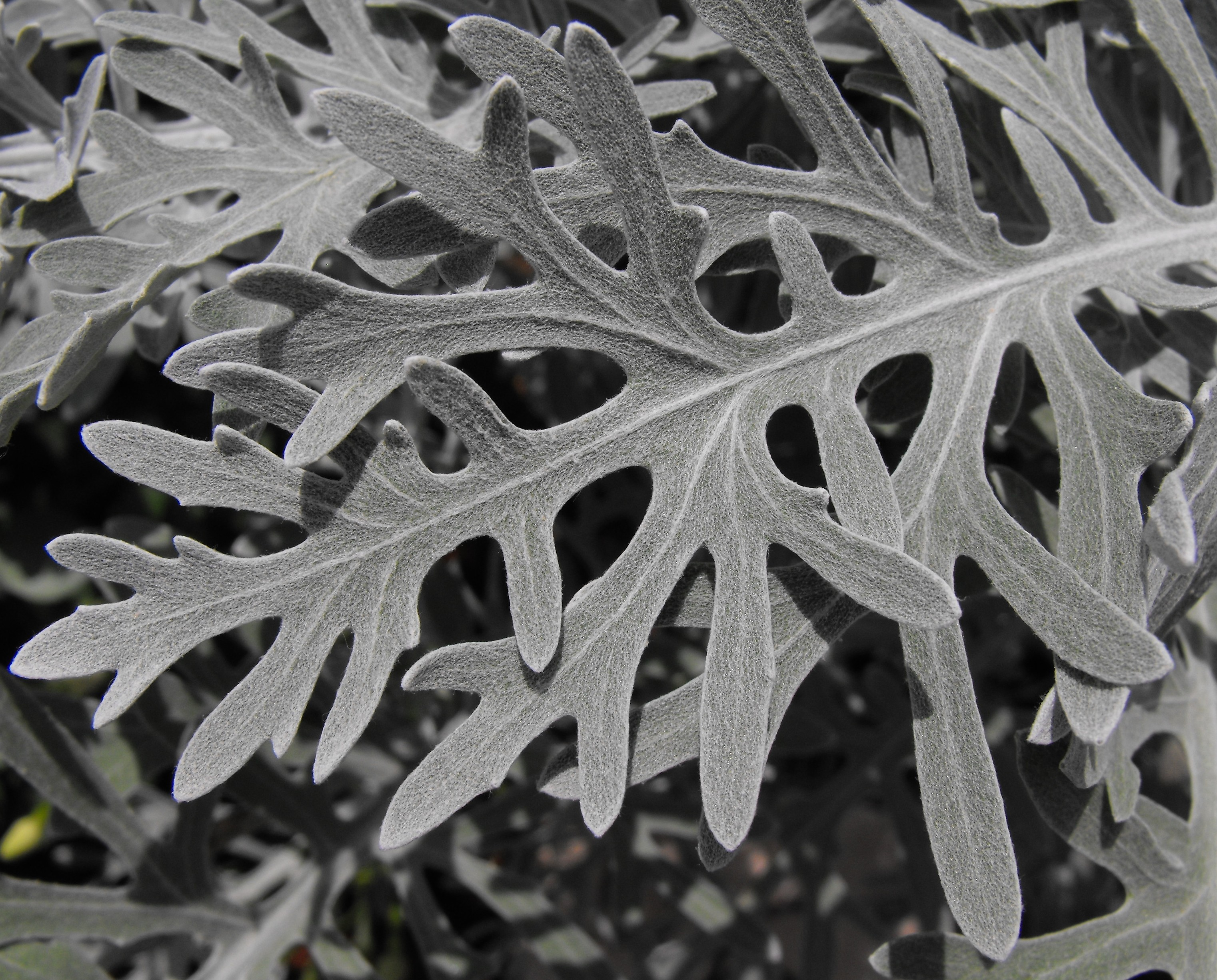

Conservation status
- Endangered (IUCN 3.1)

Scientific classification
- Kingdom: Plantae
- Clade: Tracheophytes
- Clade: Angiosperms
- Clade: Eudicots
- Clade: Asterids
- Order: Asterales
- Family: Asteraceae
- Genus: Centaurea
- Species: C. gymnocarpa

Binomial name
- Centaurea gymnocarpa Moris & De Not.

Synonyms
- Centaurea dealbata Moris ex Nyman; Centaurea gymnocarpa var. plumosa E.Vilm.

= Centaurea gymnocarpa =

Species of flowering plant

Centaurea gymnocarpa, also known as Capraian cornflower (Italian: fiordaliso di Capraia) or centaury of Capraia, is a species of flowering plant in the family Asteraceae. It is a rare species endemic to Italy found only on Capraia, a small island located in the Tuscan Archipelago, with the species being distributed across eight subpopulations on the island's surface. Its natural habitats are Mediterranean-type shrubby vegetation and rocky areas, colonizing in the cracks and fissures of cliffs.

== Description ==
This perennial plant has a woody base and long stem that reaches a height between 80 and 100 cm (27.5 and 39.3 inches). The plant is covered with dense short hairs, giving a greyish-white appearance to the plant. The leaves are somewhat fleshy and appear green above and greyish-white below, with old leaves persisting at the base. C. gymnocarpa blooms in May, producing tiny pink flowers in a compact flower head. A hybrid with the related species Centaurea cineraria is sometimes used in gardens as an ornamental plant.

== Distribution and habitat ==
Centaurea gymnocarpa is endemic to Italy found only on Capraia, a small island located in the Tuscan Archipelago, with the species being distributed across eight subpopulations on the island's surface. Its natural habitats are Mediterranean-type shrubby vegetation and rocky areas, colonizing in the cracks and fissures of cliffs.

== Conservation status ==
Centaurea gymnocarpa has previously been categorized as endangered according to the IUCN Red List in 2005, but has recently been downgraded to vulnerable status in 2017 due to an increase in recorded mature individuals (<250 in 2006, <1000 as of 2017). In addition, Carpobrotus acinaciformis, an invasive species in the area and also one of the main competitive risks for C. gymnocarpa, was eradicated during 2013-2014 on some portions of the island, leading to an increase in established seedlings in some subpopulations.

=== Threats ===
While Carpobrotus acinaciformis has been eradicated from some areas of the island, no recent data is available for other sites and as such may still pose a threat to some subpopulations. Senecio angulatus, another competitive invasive species, is also starting to expand across the island and may pose a threat to the species. In addition, increases in tourism on the island can enhance the risk of damage to the plants.
