= Must Love Cats =

- Genre: Documentary
- Starring: John Fulton
- Country of origin: United States
- Original language: English
- No. of seasons: 2
- No. of episodes: 13

Original release
- Network: Animal Planet
- Release: February 12, 2011 – September 1, 2012

Must Love Cats is an Animal Planet television series hosted by John Fulton that premiered in the United States in February 2011. In each episode, he travels through different parts of the United States and explores various aspects of the cat lovers lifestyle. Animal Planet announced in April 2011 that the series was renewed for a second season which premiered on March 10, 2012. The second season features countries outside of the United States.

== Episode list ==
=== Season 1 ===
1. Cat Poo Coffee and Klepto Kitties – West Coast of the United States (Premiered February 12, 2011)
2. Kitty Tree Houses and the Cat Guys – Great Plains (Premiered February 19, 2011)
3. Cat Musicians and Garfield's Dad – Midwestern United States. Featured a special appearance by Jim Davis and Garfield. (Premiered February 26, 2011)
4. Kitty Fashion Plates and NYC's Best Mousers – Northeastern United States (Premiered March 5, 2011)
5. Kitty Wigs and Fat Cats – Southwestern United States (Premiered March 12, 2011)
6. Cat Colleges and Kitty Heroes – Southeastern United States (Premiered March 19, 2011)

=== Season 2 ===
1. Cat Crazy in Japan – Japan (Premiered March 10, 2012)
2. Tough Guys and Acupuncture Save Cats – West Coast of the United States (Premiered March 17, 2012)
3. English Kitties and Stowaway Cats – England (Premiered March 24, 2012)
4. Kitty Kidney Transplants and the Cat Who Jogs – Germany (Premiered March 31, 2012)
5. Swimming Cats and Cat Fur Jewels – Eastern United States (Premiered April 7, 2012)
6. Prison Kitties and Apps for Cats – Eastern United States (Premiered April 14, 2012)
7. Cats for Love – Russia (Premiered September 1, 2012)

== See also ==
- Dusty the Klepto Kitty
