= Dusty (given name) =

Dusty is a given name and possibly a nickname. It may refer to:

- Dusty Blake (born 1982), American baseball coach
- Dusty Bonner (born 1979), American former football quarterback
- Dusty Button (born 1989), American ballet dancer
- Dusty Deevers, American politician and pastor
- Dusty Drake, American country singer
- Dusty Dvoracek (born 1983), American football player
- Dusty Good (born 1987), American soccer player and captain for the United States Virgin Islands national team
- Dusty Hannahs (born 1993), American basketball player in the Israeli Basketball Premier League
- Dusty Hughes (playwright) (born 1947), English playwright and director
- Dusty A. Johnson, American politician
- Dusty Jonas (born 1986), American high jumper
- Dusty the Klepto Kitty (2006–2023), American Siamese cat who gained media attention in 2011 for his numerous acts of "cat burglary"
- Dusty Limits, Australian-born cabaret singer and comedian
- Dusty Mancinelli, Canadian independent filmmaker
- Dusty May (born 1976), American basketball coach
- Dusty Noble (born 1984), South African former rugby union footballer
- Dusty Rychart (born 1978), Australian-American basketball player
- Dusty Springfield (1939–1999), British pop singer
- Dusty Street (1946–2023), American radio personality

== See also ==
- Dustie Waring (born 1985), American guitarist
- Dusty (nickname)
