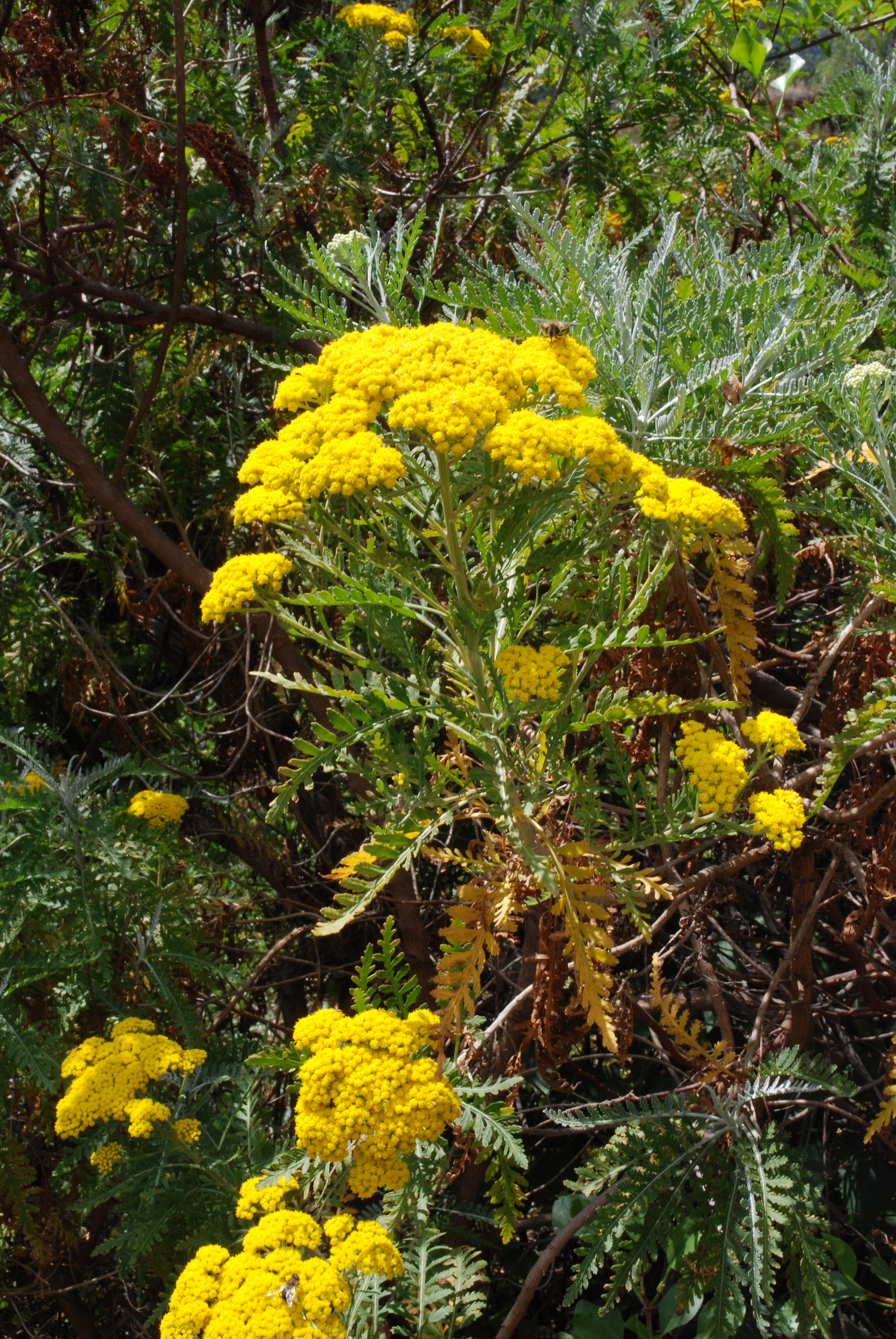

Scientific classification
- Kingdom: Plantae
- Clade: Tracheophytes
- Clade: Angiosperms
- Clade: Eudicots
- Clade: Asterids
- Order: Asterales
- Family: Asteraceae
- Subfamily: Asteroideae
- Tribe: Anthemideae
- Genus: Gonospermum; Less.

Synonyms
- Lugoa DC.

= Gonospermum =

Genus of flowering plants

Gonospermum is a genus of flowering plants in the sunflower family.

Species

All the species are endemic to the Canary Islands.

- Gonospermum canariense (DC.) Less.
- Gonospermum ferulaceum (Webb & Berthel.) Febles
- Gonospermum fruticosum (Buch) Less.
- Gonospermum gomerae Bolle
- Gonospermum revolutum (C.Sm. ex Buch) Sch.Bip.
- Gonospermum oshanahanii (Marrero Rodr., Febles & Suárez) Febles
- Gonospermum ptarmiciflorum (Webb) Febles

The genus was originally described as Lugoa by Augustin Pyramus de Candolle, and was named after Alonso Fernández de Lugo.
