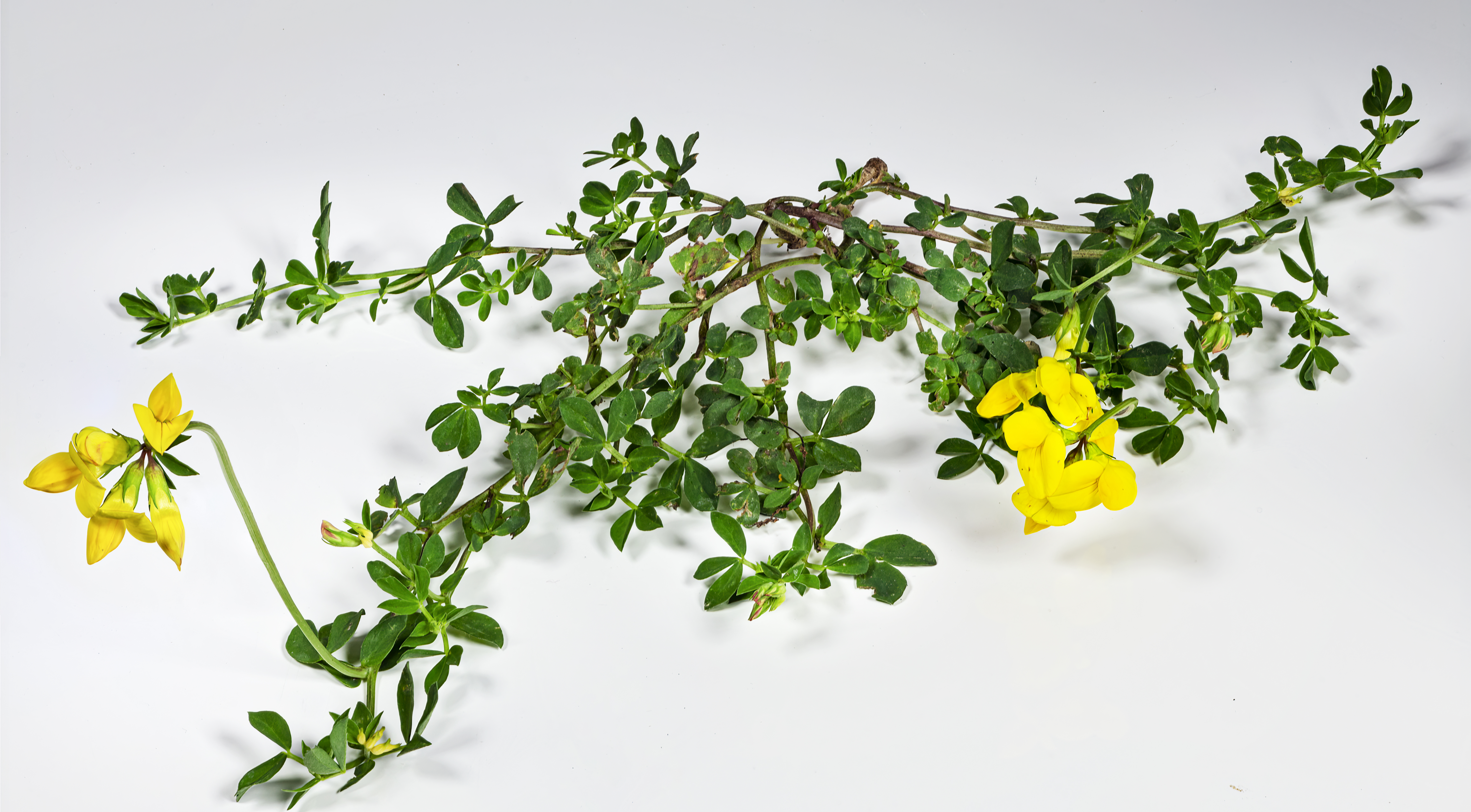

Scientific classification
- Kingdom: Plantae
- Clade: Tracheophytes
- Clade: Angiosperms
- Clade: Eudicots
- Clade: Rosids
- Order: Fabales
- Family: Fabaceae
- Subfamily: Faboideae
- Genus: Lotus
- Species: L. corniculatus

Binomial name
- Lotus corniculatus L.

Subspecies
- Lotus corniculatus subsp. afghanicus Chrtková; Lotus corniculatus subsp. corniculatus; Lotus corniculatus subsp. delortii (Timb.-Lagr.) Nyman; Lotus corniculatus subsp. fruticosus Chrtková; Lotus corniculatus subsp. preslii (Ten.) P.Fourn.

Synonyms
- List: Lotus alpicola (Beck) Miniaev, Ulle & Kritzk.; Lotus ambiguus Besser ex Spreng.; Lotus angustifolius Gueldenst.; Lotus arvensis Pers.; Lotus balticus Miniaev; Lotus barcinonensis Sennen; Lotus bracteatus Wall.; Lotus callunetorum (Üksip) Miniaev; Lotus catalaunicus Sennen; Lotus caucasicus Kuprian.; Lotus colocensis Menyh.; Lotus corniculatus var. alandicus Chrtková; Lotus corniculatus subsp. ambiguus (Besser ex Spreng.) Tzvelev; Lotus corniculatus var. arvensis (Pers.) Ser.; Lotus corniculatus subsp. callunetorum (Üksip) Tzvelev; Lotus corniculatus f. carnosus (Pers.) Ostenf.; Lotus corniculatus var. crassifolius Pers.; Lotus corniculatus var. fallax Chrtková; Lotus corniculatus var. futakii Starm.; Lotus corniculatus subsp. komarovii (Miniaev) Tzvelev; Lotus corniculatus var. norvegicus Chrtková; Lotus corniculatus var. posoniensis Chrtková; Lotus corniculatus subsp. ruprechtii (Miniaev) Tzvelev; Lotus corniculatus var. sativus Hyl.; Lotus corniculatus var. sennenii Afr.Fern.; Lotus corniculatus var. sibthorpii (Rouy) Asch. & Graebn.; Lotus corniculatus var. slovacus (Chrtková) Starm.; Lotus delortii Timb.-Lagr.; Lotus delortii var. rivasii Afr.Fern.; Lotus depressus Willd.; Lotus dvinensis Miniaev & Ulle; Lotus forsteri Sweet; Lotus gibbus Beeke; Lotus haeupleri G.H.Loos; Lotus humifusus Willd.; Lotus juzepczukii Seregin; Lotus komarovii Miniaev; Lotus norvegicus (Chrtková) Miniaev; Lotus olgae Klokov; Lotus orphanidis Ujhelyi; Lotus pentaphyllos Gilib.; Lotus pilosissimus Schur; Lotus pilosus Jord.; Lotus preslii Ten.; Lotus riparius Pers.; Lotus rostellatus Heldr.; Lotus ruprechtii Miniaev; Lotus sativus (Hyl.) Büscher & G.H.Loos; Lotus stenodon (Boiss. & Heldr.) Heldr.; Lotus suberectus G.H.Loos; Lotus symmetricus Jord.; Lotus tauricus Juz.; Lotus tauricus Steud.; Lotus tchihatchewii Boiss.; Lotus tenuifolius C.Presl; Lotus uliginosus Hoffm.; Lotus zhegulensis Klokov; Mullaghera communis Bubani

= Lotus corniculatus =

Plant species in the pea family

Lotus corniculatus is a flowering plant in the pea family Fabaceae. Common names include common bird's-foot trefoil, eggs and bacon, birdsfoot deervetch, and just bird's-foot trefoil (a name also often applied to other Lotus spp.). It has a wide distribution and is a favored forage for livestock.

== Description ==
It is a perennial herbaceous plant. The height of the plant is variable, from 5 to 20 centimetres (2 to 8 inches), occasionally more where supported by other plants; the stems can reach up to 50 cm (20 in) long.

The name 'bird's foot' refers to the appearance of the seed pods on their stalk. The leaves have five leaflets, but with the central three held conspicuously above the others, hence the use of the name 'trefoil'. There are no tendrils. The flowers are in clusters on a longish stalk. The five green sepals are fused into a tube around the base of the petals. The 5 yellow petals form a shape typical of peas; the lower two are fused into a boat shape, the uppermost is erect and the remaining two are at the sides as wings. The 10 stamens and single carpel are concealed by the petals.

The flowers bloom from June to September and develop into small pea-like pods or legumes.

The plant had many common English names in Britain, which are now mostly out of use. These names were often connected with the yellow and orange colour of the flowers, e.g. 'butter and eggs'. One name that is still used is eggs and bacon (or bacon and eggs).

The leaves are similar in appearance to some clovers.

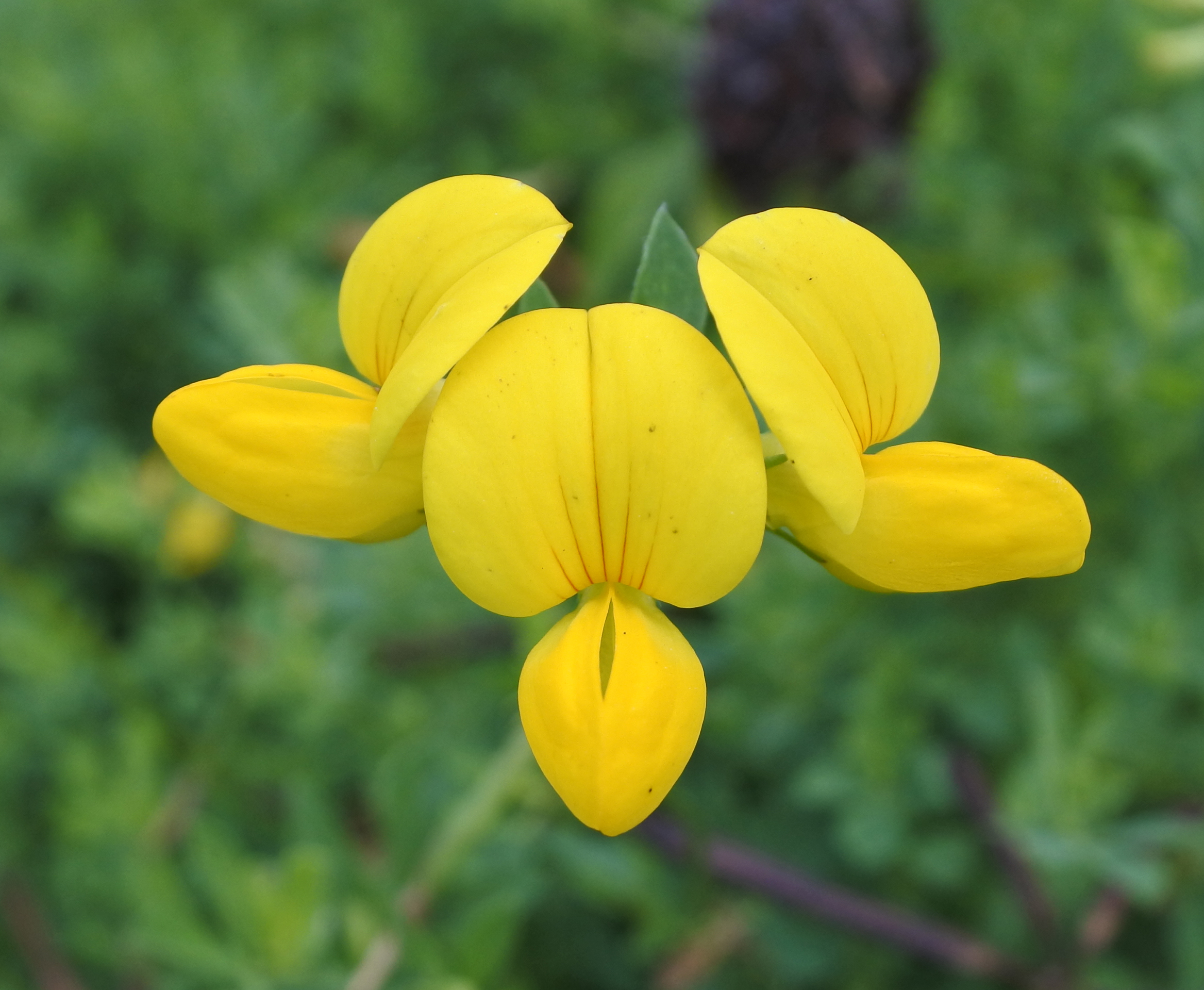
Lotus corniculatus flowers in southeastern Minnesota (late July 2016)

== Subtaxa ==
The following subspecies are accepted:

- Lotus corniculatus subsp. afghanicus Chrtková
- Lotus corniculatus subsp. corniculatus
- Lotus corniculatus subsp. delortii (Timb.-Lagr.) Nyman
- Lotus corniculatus subsp. fruticosus Chrtková
- Lotus corniculatus subsp. preslii (Ten.) P.Fourn.

== Distribution and habitat ==
Lotus corniculatus has a broad distribution worldwide. It is native to temperate Eurasia and North Africa. It is common everywhere in Britain and Ireland.

Habitats include old fields, grassy places, and roadsides. It is typically sprawling at the height of the surrounding grassland. It can survive fairly close grazing, trampling, and mowing. It is most often found in sandy soils.

== Ecology ==
The flowers are mostly visited by bumblebees. In the Chicago Region, mostly non-native bees have been observed visiting the flowers, including Andrena wilkella, Anthidium oblongatum, Apis mellifera and Megachile rotundata. The native bees Bombus impatiens and Megachile relativa have also been observed visiting birdsfoot trefoil flowers, though the latter only rarely.

The plant is an important nectar source for many insects and is also used as a larval food plant by many species of Lepidoptera such as six-spot burnet and the silver-studded blue. It is a host plant for the wood white butterfly, Leptidea sinapis.

=== As an invasive species ===
Birdsfoot trefoil is an invasive species in many parts of North America and Australia. It has been commonly planted along roadsides for erosion control or pastures for forage and then spreads into natural areas. Once it has established in an area, it can outcompete native species. The use of prescribed fire is not an effective management tool against L. corniculatus and herbicide is recommended instead to control it.

== Potential health concerns ==
The species contains cyanogenic glycosides, which release small amounts of hydrogen cyanide when macerated. This is not normally poisonous to humans, though, as the dose is very low, and the metabolization of cyanide is relatively quick. Condensed tannins are also present.

== Uses ==
It is used in agriculture as a forage plant, grown for pasture, hay, and silage. It is a high quality forage that does not cause bloat in ruminants. Taller-growing cultivars have been developed for this. It may be used as an alternative to alfalfa in poor soils.

A double-flowered variety is grown as an ornamental plant. It is regularly included as a component of wildflower mixes in Europe. It can also prevent soil erosion and provide a good habitat for wildlife.

In the traditional medicine of the Sannio regio of Italy, the diluted infusions were used for anxiety, insomnia, and exhaustion.

== Gallery ==
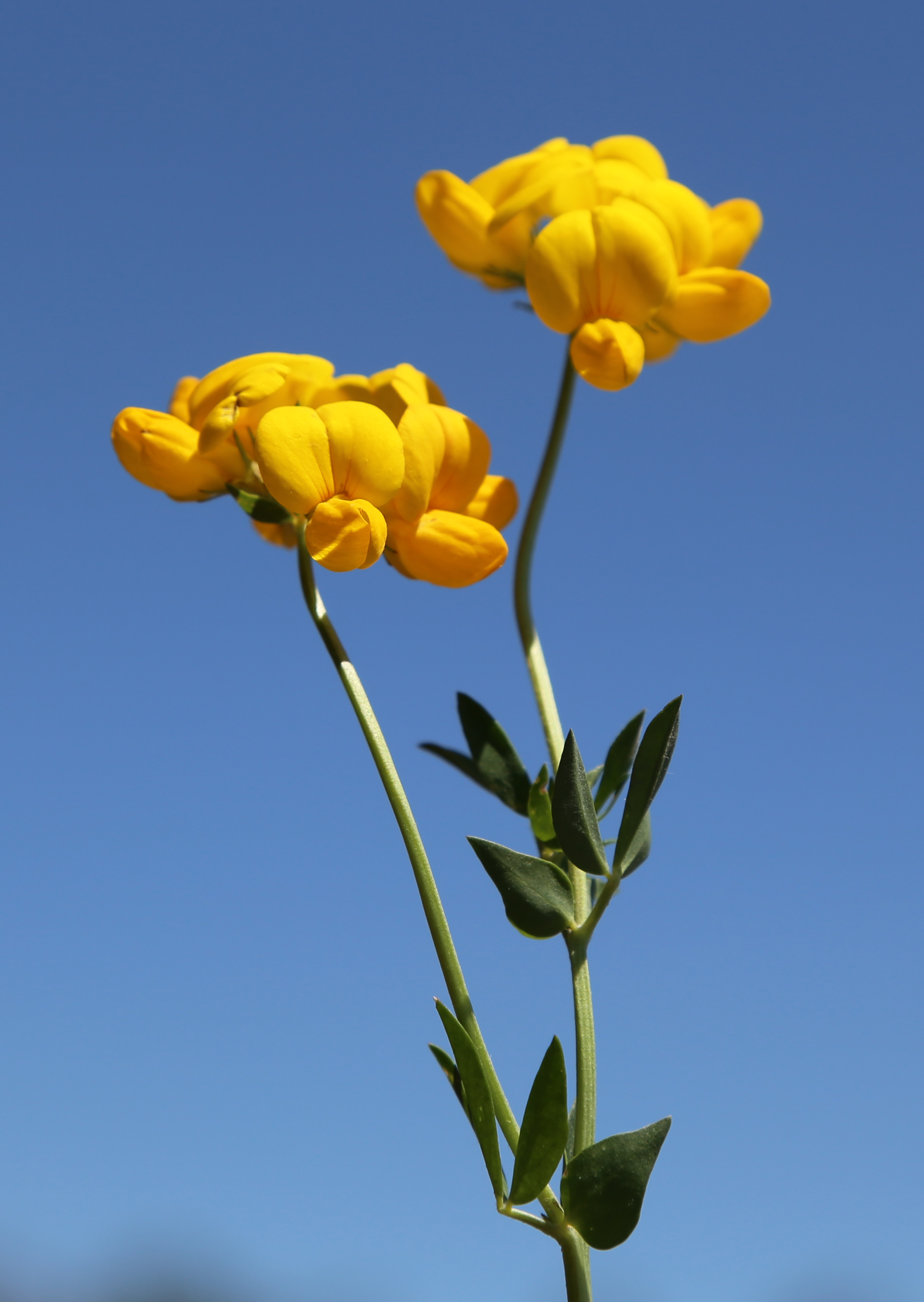
Flowerheads and 5-leaflet leaves

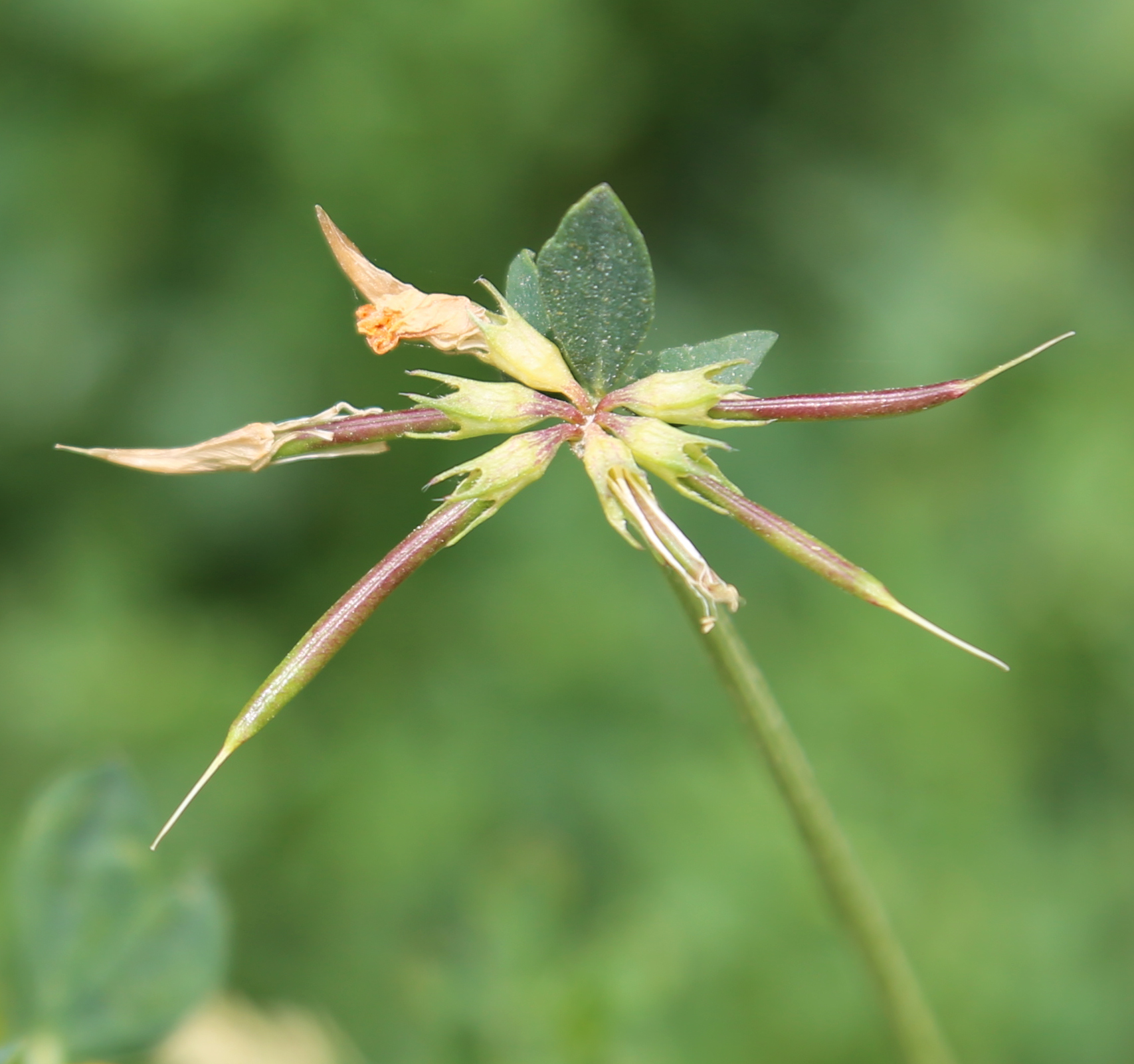
Young seedhead

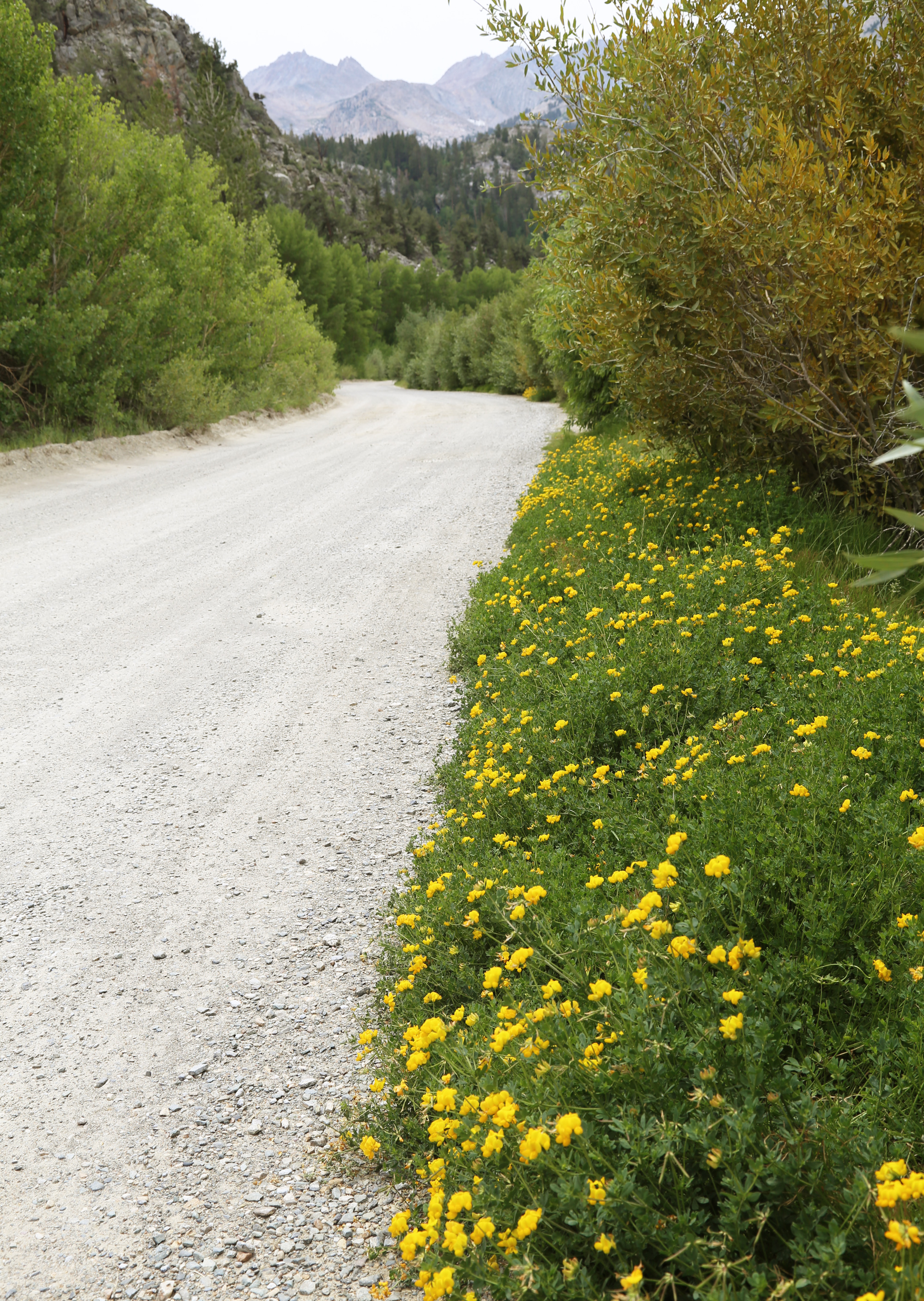
Along high-altitude roadside
