= Dusted =

Dusted may refer to:

- Dusted (Gin Blossoms album), 1989
- Dusted (Live Skull album), 1987
- Dusted (Skrew album), 1994
- Dusted (British band), the joint venture of Rollo & Mark Bates
- Dusted (Canadian band), a Canadian indie rock band
- "Dusted" (song), a 1999 song by Leftfield from their album Rhythm and Stealth

== See also ==
- Dust (disambiguation)
- Dusting (disambiguation)
