= Dustin =

Dustin may refer to:

== Places in the United States ==
- Dustin, Nebraska
- Dustin Township, Holt County, Nebraska
- Dustin, Oklahoma

== Other uses ==
- Dustin (name), including a list of people and fictional characters with the given name or surname
- Dustin AB, Swedish electronics store
- Dustin (comic strip), a syndicated comic strip by Steve Kelley and Jeff Parker
- Dustin (film), a 2020 short drama film by Naïla Guiguet

== See also ==
- Dusting (disambiguation)
