= Dusting attack =

Attack on a cryptocurrency wallet

A dusting attack or dust attack is an attack on a cryptocurrency wallet that sends tiny amounts of cryptocurrency (known as "dust") to that wallet in order to uncover the identity of the wallet's owner. Information can then be used to obstruct receiving legitimate payments or phishing scams.

Victims are sent a token to their wallet via an airdrop. When the victim attempts to cash out the token, the sender is able to access the wallet through the smart contract attached to the token.
