= Dusty, New Mexico =

Unincorporated community in New Mexico, US

- Unincorporated community
- Location within the state of New Mexico Dusty (the United States)
- Coordinates: 33°37′37″N 107°39′19″W
- Country: United States
- State: New Mexico
- County: Socorro
- Elevation: 6,437 ft (1,962 m)
- Time zone: UTC-7 (Mountain (MST))
  - Summer (DST): UTC-6 (MDT)
- ZIP codes: 87943
- Area code: 575
- GNIS feature ID: 1984620

Dusty is an unincorporated community in Socorro County, New Mexico, United States.

== History ==
A post office was established in 1927, and remained in operation until 1983. The dusty character of local roads account for the name.

New Mexico Highway 52 passes by Dusty, N.M. This road, though gravel surfaced, has been recorded in Google Earth, and so one can get a road view of Dusty as it exists today. There appear to be one or more residences, but no businesses in operation.
