= Frank Flanagan =

Irish association football player

Frank "Dusty" Flanagan is an Irish former association football player who played for Drogheda United and won the league cup with "the drogs" in 1984. He also was in the team that played Tottenham Hotspur in the UEFA Cup in 1984. He retired from football in 1992.
