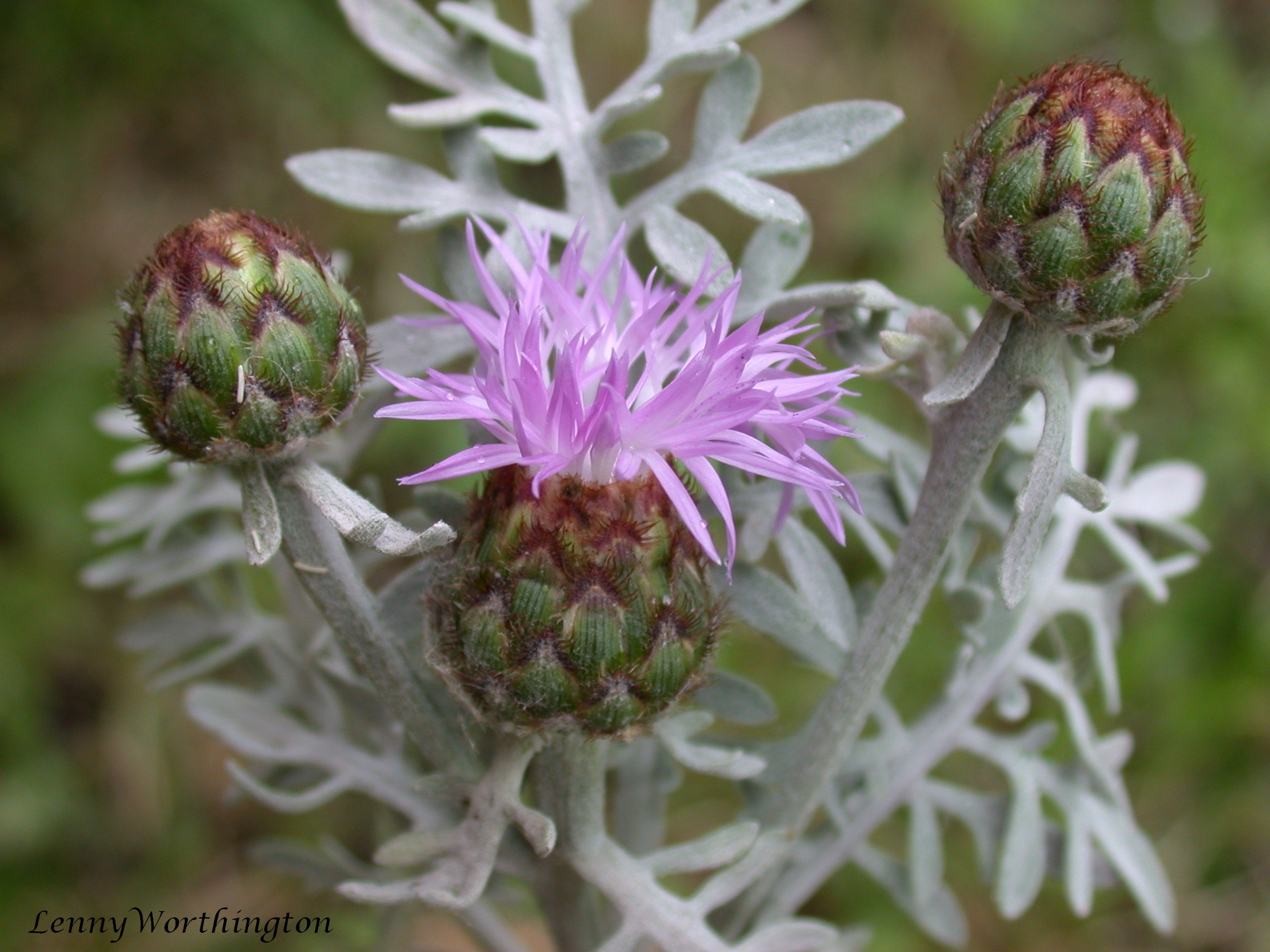

Conservation status
- Endangered (IUCN 3.1)

Scientific classification
- Kingdom: Plantae
- Clade: Tracheophytes
- Clade: Angiosperms
- Clade: Eudicots
- Clade: Asterids
- Order: Asterales
- Family: Asteraceae
- Genus: Centaurea
- Species: C. cineraria

Binomial name
- Centaurea cineraria L.

Subspecies
- Centaurea cineraria subsp. cineraria; Centaurea cineraria subsp. circae (Sommier) Cela Renz. & Viegi; Centaurea cineraria subsp. sirenum (Lacaita) Pignatti & Iamonico ex Iamonico & Del Guacchio

Synonyms
- Species: Acosta cineraria (L.) Holub; Acosta cinerea Holub, nom. superfl.; Centaurea candidissima Lam., nom. superfl.; Centaurea cineraria subsp. cinerea Dostál, not validly publ.; Centaurea cinerea Lam., nom. superfl.; Centaurea elegans Salisb., nom. superfl.; Jacea cineraria (L.) Delarbre; Menomphalus cineraria (L.) Pomel; Staebe cineraria (L.) Hill; C. cineraria subsp. cineraria: Centaurea acutifolia Schur, not validly publ.; Centaurea prostrata A.Huet ex Nyman, not validly publ.; C. cineraria subsp. circae: Centaurea cineraria var. circae Sommier; C. cineraria subsp. sirenum: Centaurea cineraria var. sirenum Lacaita

= Centaurea cineraria =

Species of flowering plant

Centaurea cineraria, the velvet centaurea, also known as dusty miller and silver dust (though these latter two names may also apply to Jacobaea maritima and Silene coronaria), is a species of flowering plant in the family Asteraceae endemic to southern Italy. In natural settings, it grows on coastal cliffs, ranging from 0–350 m above sea level, hence the plant's Italian name, fiordaliso delle scogliere (lit. "cliff cornflower"). Mature plants may reach 80 centimetres (31.5 in) in height. The species produces purple flowers.

Centaurea cineraria is taxonomically complicated, with several described subspecies and significant geographic variation. Members of the C. cineraria group have variously been treated as full species, as subspecies, or simply as regional variations.

== In Horticulture ==
Centaurea cineraria is commonly cultivated for its foliage. Depending on climate, it can be grown as either an annual or as a perennial. In cultivation, this species prefers full sun and well-drained soil.

Centaurea cineraria is sometimes referred to as Centaurea gymnocarpa within the horticultural trade, due to both taxonomic confusion and/or potential hybridization between C. cineraria and C. gymnocarpa in cultivation. However, cultivated material seems to mostly consist of C. cineraria in a narrower sense, with some possible introgression from other members of the C. cineraria group (including C. gymnocarpa). True C. gymnocarpa is a rare plant in the wild and likely does not exist in cultivation outside of conservation settings. Despite past work that sometimes treated C. gymnocarpa as conspecific with C. cineraria, current work supports both taxa at the species level.

Centaurea cineraria occasionally escapes from cultivation, but, at least in North America, this has not resulted in established exotic populations. This species is, however, naturalized in New Zealand.

In the UK Centaurea cineraria subsp. cineraria has gained the Royal Horticultural Society's Award of Garden Merit.

Because of similar leaf shape, leaf hairiness, and leaf color, there has been much confusion in the horticultural world between C. cineraria and the unrelated Jacobaea maritima (with Senecio cineraria being an old name for Jacobaea maritima). Jacobaea maritima has similar foliage to C. cineraria ("cineraria" means "ash-gray colored"). Cultivars like 'Silver Dust', 'Silver Lace', and 'Cirrus' are sometimes mistakenly referred to as C. cineraria but these cultivars actually pertain to J. maritima. The cultivar 'Colchester White' (named for the leaf color, not the flower color) does actually pertain to C. cineraria and is the most common cultivar of this species. This confusion has also resulted in many images on the internet being mistakenly identified, resulting in identification of cultivated material challenging, especially without reproductive parts.
