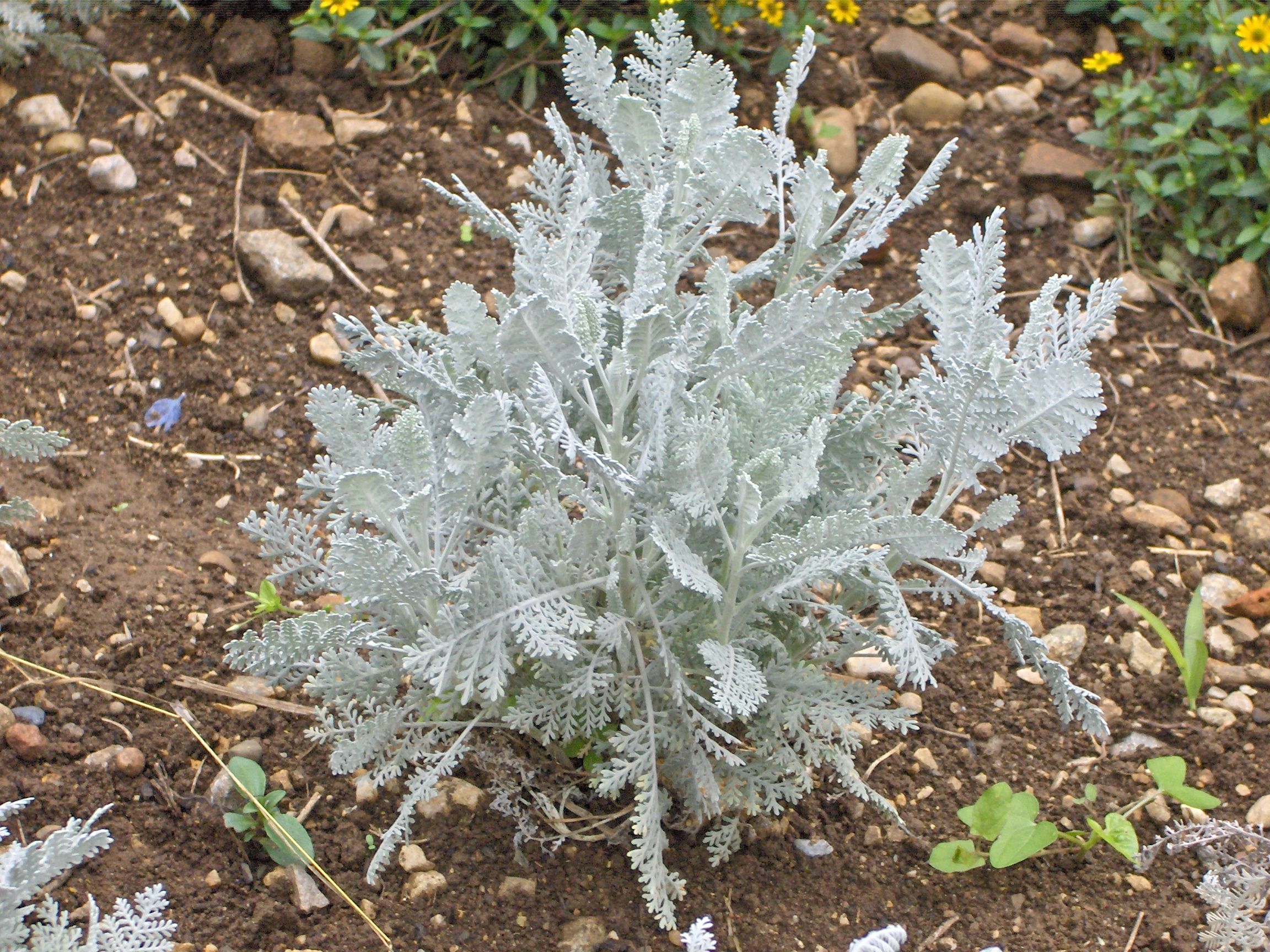

Scientific classification
- Kingdom: Plantae
- Clade: Embryophytes
- Clade: Tracheophytes
- Clade: Spermatophytes
- Clade: Angiosperms
- Clade: Eudicots
- Clade: Asterids
- Order: Asterales
- Family: Asteraceae
- Genus: Gonospermum
- Species: G. ptarmiciflorum

Binomial name
- Gonospermum ptarmiciflorum (Webb. & Berthel.) Febles

Synonyms
- Tanacetum ptarmiciflorum (Webb. & Berthel.) Sch.Bip.; Chrysanthemum ptarmiciflorum (Webb) Brenan; Pyrethrum ptarmiciflorum Webb

= Gonospermum ptarmiciflorum =

Species of shrub

Gonospermum ptarmiciflorum, formerly Tanacetum ptarmiciflorum, is a shrub with silvery leaves in the family Asteraceae. The species is endemic to the Canary Islands, where it is endangered in the wild. Suited to dry climates, the shrubby silvery-leaved perennial is cultivated an ornamental plant, commonly known as the silver lace bush.
