= Stellar Corpses =

American Psychobilly Horror Punk Band

- Origin: Santa Cruz, California, United States
- Genres: psychobilly; horror punk; Punk rock; Heavy Metal; gothic rock
- Years active: (2005–2023)
- Labels: Batcave Records; Santa Carla Records; Chapter 11 Records

Stellar Corpses was a psychobilly horror punk band formed in Santa Cruz, California, in 2005. The first lineup included singer, guitarist and primary songwriter, Dustan Sheehan, known as Dusty Grave, upright bassist Dan Lamothe, drummer, Matt Macabre and lead guitarist, Mr. Grim. Their sound and style combined elements of psychobilly, Horror punk, hardcore punk gothic rock and metal. Since their formation Stellar Corpses toured both in the US and internationally.

Stellar Corpses is an astronomy term that means "Dead Stars", a double entendre used by the Dusty in his songwriting to also refer to dead movie stars and rockstars, particularly in the songs Dead Stars Drive-In and Dark Side of the American Dream. On Halloween 2005, Stellar Corpses headlined their first show at the 418 Project in Santa Cruz.

Since their inception they released records through Hairball 8 Records, FiendForce Records, Chapter 11 Records and Batcave Records.

Their music has also been featured in the television series Road Trip Masters.

Dusty also played upright bass for BAT!, signed to Cleopatra Records, and occasionally played lead guitar for Rezurex.

== Respect the Dead EP ==
Stellar Corpses' first EP, Respect The Dead, was independently released in 2007 on their own label, Santa Carla Records, named after The Lost Boys (1987) filmed in their hometown, Santa Cruz. The EP was recorded at The Compound Recording Studios in Santa Cruz by Joe Clements (singer of Fury 66). Stellar Corpses is said to have made an immediate impact in their genre with songs such as “Cemetery Man” and “Leave A Stellar Corpse.”

== Welcome to the Nightmare ==
Following a five-week European tour with Rezurex, Stellar Corpses released their first full-length album in 2009 entitled, "Welcome to the Nightmare" named after an underground psychobilly zine from Santa Cruz. The album was released in 2009 on Santa Carla Records in the US and FiendForce Records in Germany. The album has been called a "deadly delight" and is said to feature more of the band's influences, without losing any of the power and fury of their debut EP as well as "a competent, driven, and ultimately rather enjoyable take on the narrowly defined genre".

== Vampire Kiss ==
On Halloween 2011, Stellar Corpses released the single "Vampire Kiss" and hosted a music video premiere at The Viper Room in Hollywood. The music video for "Vampire Kiss", directed by Justin Janowitz stars Alycia Paulsen and features cameos by Hunter Burgan of the band AFI and producer Joe McGrath as vampires. The video was filmed on location at the Santa Cruz Beach Boardwalk and at Bethel Encino Church in the city of Encino.

== Dead Stars Drive-In ==
January 2012 saw the release of the band's second full-length album, "Dead Stars Drive-In" produced, engineered and mixed by Joe McGrath who also had a hand in engineering and/or producing albums for Green Day, Blink 182, AFI, Tiger Army and Alkaline Trio. The title track is an homage to the "dead stars" of Hollywood including Elvis Presley, Marilyn Monroe, Bela Lugosi and Maila Nurmi, also known as Vampira. The songs "Vampire Kiss", "Evil Dead" and "Dead Stars Drive-In" feature backing vocals from Hunter Burgan (AFI bassist). "Be Still My Heart" features sound design by Jade Puget (AFI guitarist). “Twisted Fantasy” features guest vocals by Michale Graves (former Misfits singer).

== Batcave Records ==
In late 2016 Stellar Corpses lead singer Dusty Grave founded Batcave Records. The record label was home for Stellar Corpses and up-and-coming bands in the genre.

== Hellbound Heart EP ==
In 2018 Batcave Records co-produced the five song EP "Hellbound Heart" which featured Jimmy Calabrese of Calabrese on the title track.

== Immortuos: The Batcave Sessions ==
In 2019 all of the members except Dusty quit the band. Dusty gave interviews where he stated that his bandmates did not share his desire to tour. However, this has since been disputed by his bandmates who state that they left because Dusty wanted to kick co-founding member Dan out of the band.

The band was repopulated with new musicians for the purpose of touring, such as Jack Cash, Todd Bowen and Michael Maniacal. The reformed Stellar Corpses played only the band's existing material, and a studio album called Immortuos: The Batcave Sessions was sold during the tour. This album featured the new band performing recordings of the band's existing material to be played on the tour. During this time, Stellar Corpses played shows in America on Calabrese's Flee the Light tour, as well as other shows with acts like Nekromantix.

== Murderville and Dusty's Arrest ==
Dusty disappeared from social media around 2020. In late 2022, Stellar Corpses social media became active again, releasing a number of cover songs to YouTube, such as Zombie by The Cranberries and Thriller by Michael Jackson.

In February 2023, former Stellar Corpses band member, Dan Lamothe died during a firefighter training session. Dusty took this moment to promote the release of a forthcoming final album, Murderville including leading single Face Your Fears, after which he would bring the band to an end.

On March 14 the US Attorney's Office announced charges against Dusty Grave, legally known as Dustan David Sheehan, for distributing child pornography and possession of and access with intent to view child pornography. In an August 2020 conversation with an undercover agent on the Kik internet messaging platform, Sheehan discussed his desire to meet and sexually abuse the undercover’s fictitious 9-year-old daughter, and mentioned having abused his nieces as children, according to the complaint affidavit. Sheehan allegedly also shared sexually explicit images with the undercover agent. During a subsequent search of Sheehan’s residence, investigators FBI identified approximately 2,919 CSAM images and 21 CSAM videos on Sheehan’s digital devices.

Following the spread of this news, bandmates past and present and bands signed to Batcave Records USA disavowed Dusty's alleged criminal behaviour and stated their intentions to end their contracts with Batcave Records. Since the US Attorney's announcement, the majority of Stellar Corpses and Batcave Records social media has been taken down. Notably, Cleopatra Records continued to sell Dusty's Murderville Release, though it was at a reduced price of $9.98, despite public complaints that the label should stop selling the album.

After initially entering a plea of innocence, on January 11, 2024, Dustan David Sheehan (Dusty) entered a plea agreement to the United States District Court of the Central District of California, wherein he agreed to plead guilty to Count Two of the Information, namely that he had "knowingly distributed child pornography" on September 5, 2020, consisting of three videos. The violation carries a 5 year minimum, 20 year maximum prison sentence, after which time he has agreed to 20 years of supervised release, probation, and will register as a sex offender upon leaving prison, unable to visit places where children congregate or to have direct contact with children. The plea was accepted by Judge George H. Wu on February 1, 2024. Sentencing was set to occur no later than October 17, 2024.

== Members ==
=== Current members ===
- Dusty Grave - lead vocals, guitar

=== Touring members ===
- Jack Cash - guitar
- Michael Maniacal - bass
- Todd Bowen - drums

=== Former members ===
- Daniel Lamothe - upright bass (died 2023)
- Emilio Menze - guitar
- Jacklyn Paulette - guitar
- Kyle Moore - drums
- Matt Macabre - drums
- Mr. Grim - guitar
- Poison - drums
- Randy Moore- guitar
- Skye Vaughan-Jayne - guitar

== Albums ==
=== Studio albums ===
- Welcome to the Nightmare (2008)
- Dead Stars Drive-In] (2012)

=== Singles ===
- "Vampire Kiss" (2011)

=== EPs ===
- Respect The Dead EP (2007)
- Hellbound Heart EP (2018)

=== Compilations ===
- Psycho Ward 2 - "Dr. Plainfield" (2008)
- Sonic Seducer Cold Hands Seduction · Vol. 98 - "Teenage Witchcraft" (2009)
- Ox-Compilation 85 - "Love Like This" (2009)
- The Sound Of Horror Vol. 1 - "My Shadow" (2010)
- Psychomania No.7 - "Cemetery Man" (2010)
- Psycho Sounds Of The Underground - "Can't Keep A Good Corpse Down" (2011)
- HorrorHound Presents: It's Only a Movie - "Power of the Night" (2016)
