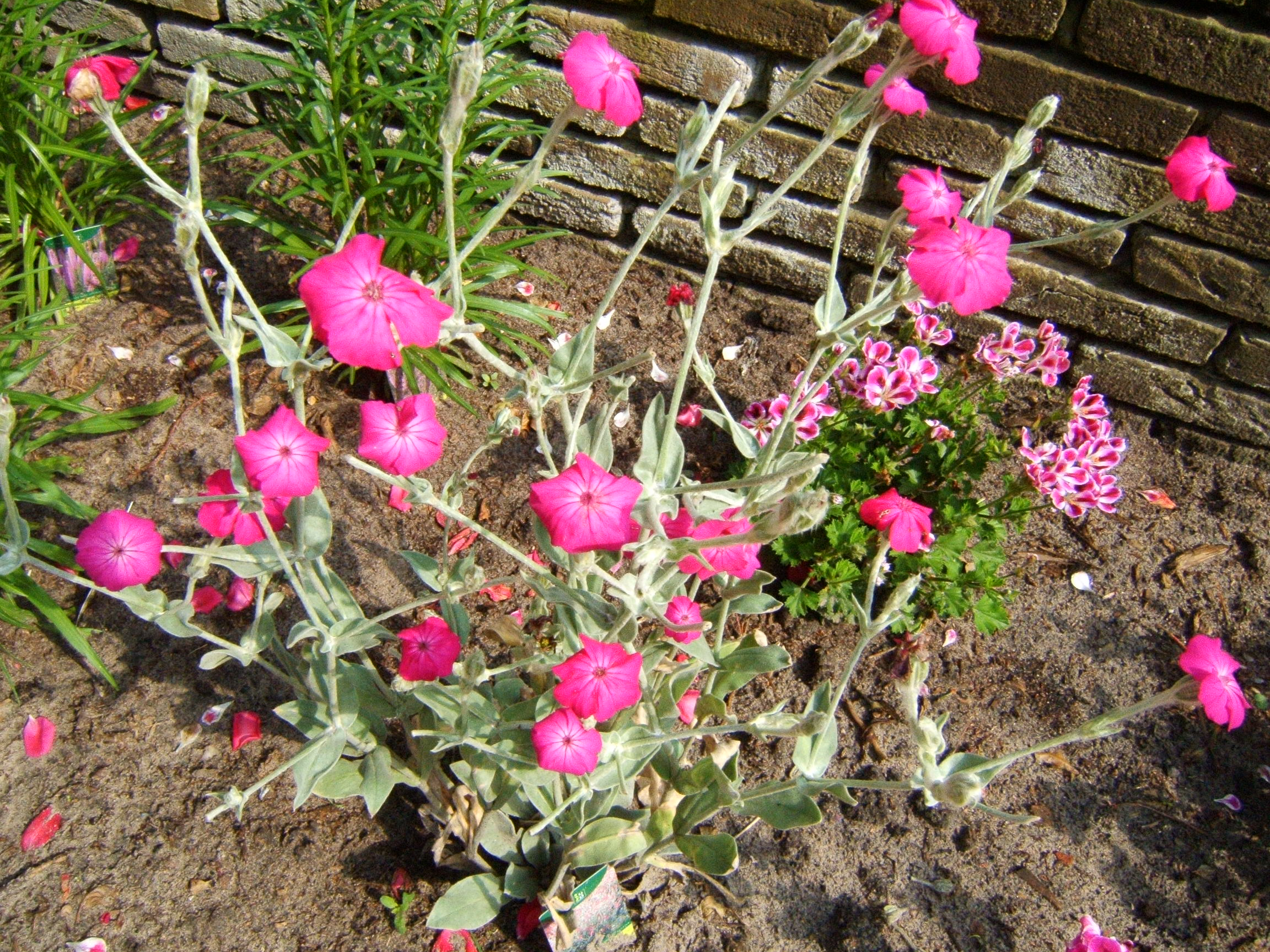

Scientific classification
- Kingdom: Plantae
- Clade: Tracheophytes
- Clade: Angiosperms
- Clade: Eudicots
- Order: Caryophyllales
- Family: Caryophyllaceae
- Genus: Silene
- Species: S. coronaria

Binomial name
- Silene coronaria (L.) Clairv.

Synonyms
- Agrostemma coronaria L. Lychnis coronaria (L.) Desr.

= Silene coronaria =

Species of flowering plant

Silene coronaria, the rose campion, is a species of flowering plant in the family Caryophyllaceae, native to Eurasia. Other common names include dusty miller (which also refers to Centaurea cineraria and Jacobaea maritima), mullein-pink and bloody William. In the United Kingdom it is still widely referenced under its synonym Lychnis coronaria.

== Description ==
It is a perennial growing to 80 centimetres (31 inches) tall by 45 cm (18 in) wide, with grey felted leaves and single, bright magenta flowers produced in succession around July. Though short-lived, the plant readily self-seeds in favourable locations. It is sometimes grown as a biennial.

== Etymology ==
The Latin coronaria means "used for garlands".

== Cultivation ==
It has gained the Royal Horticultural Society's Award of Garden Merit, as has the white-flowered cultivar 'Alba'.

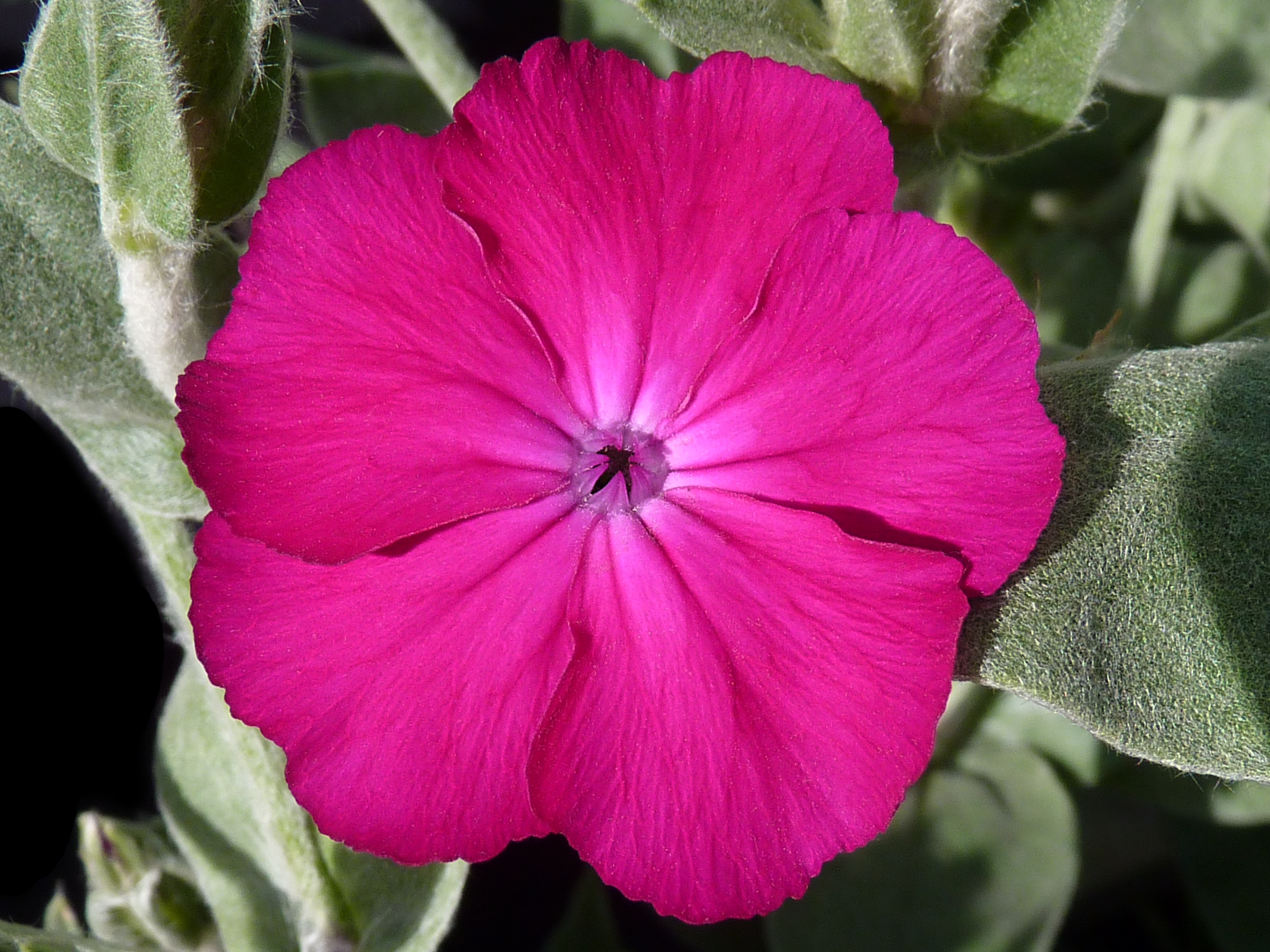

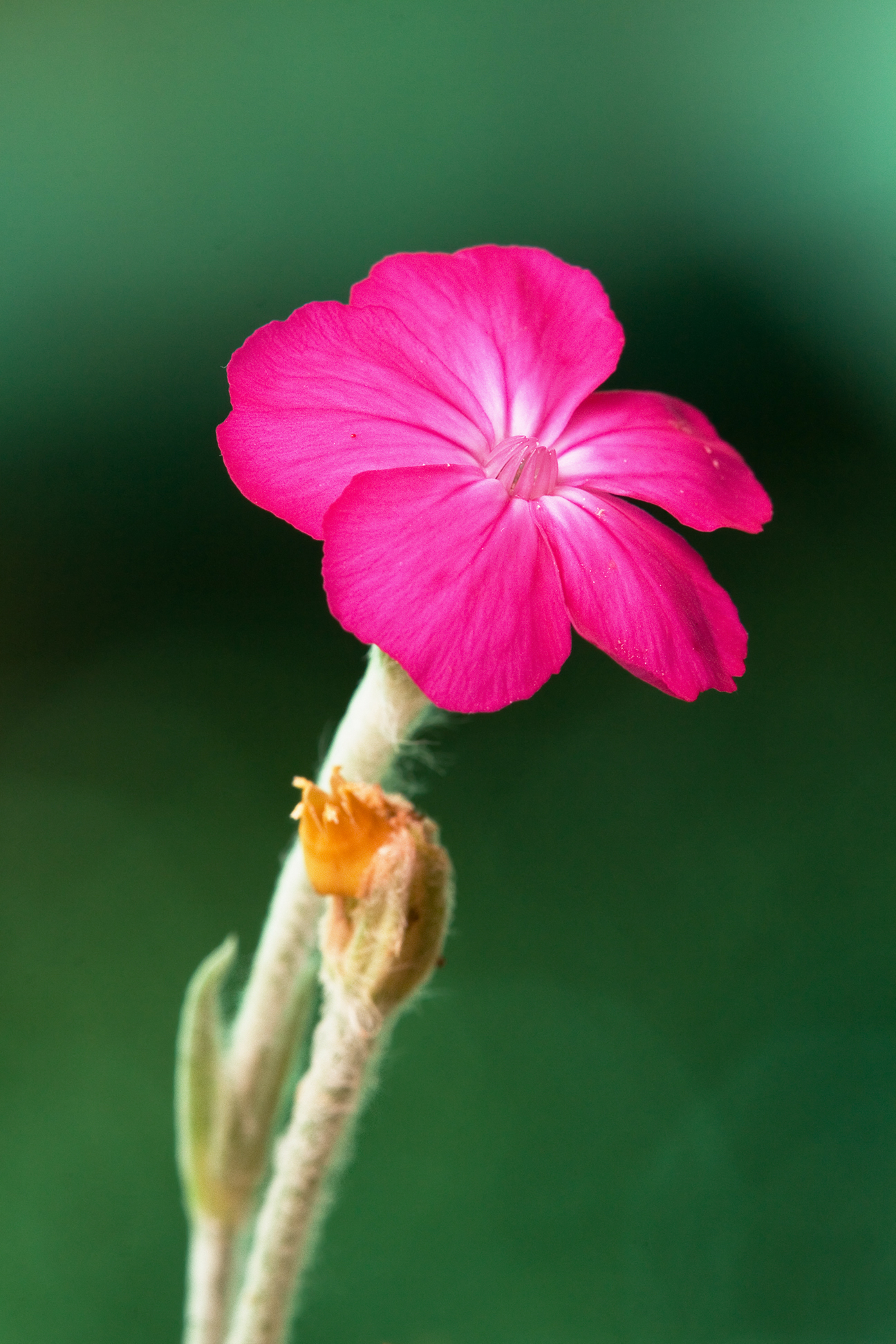

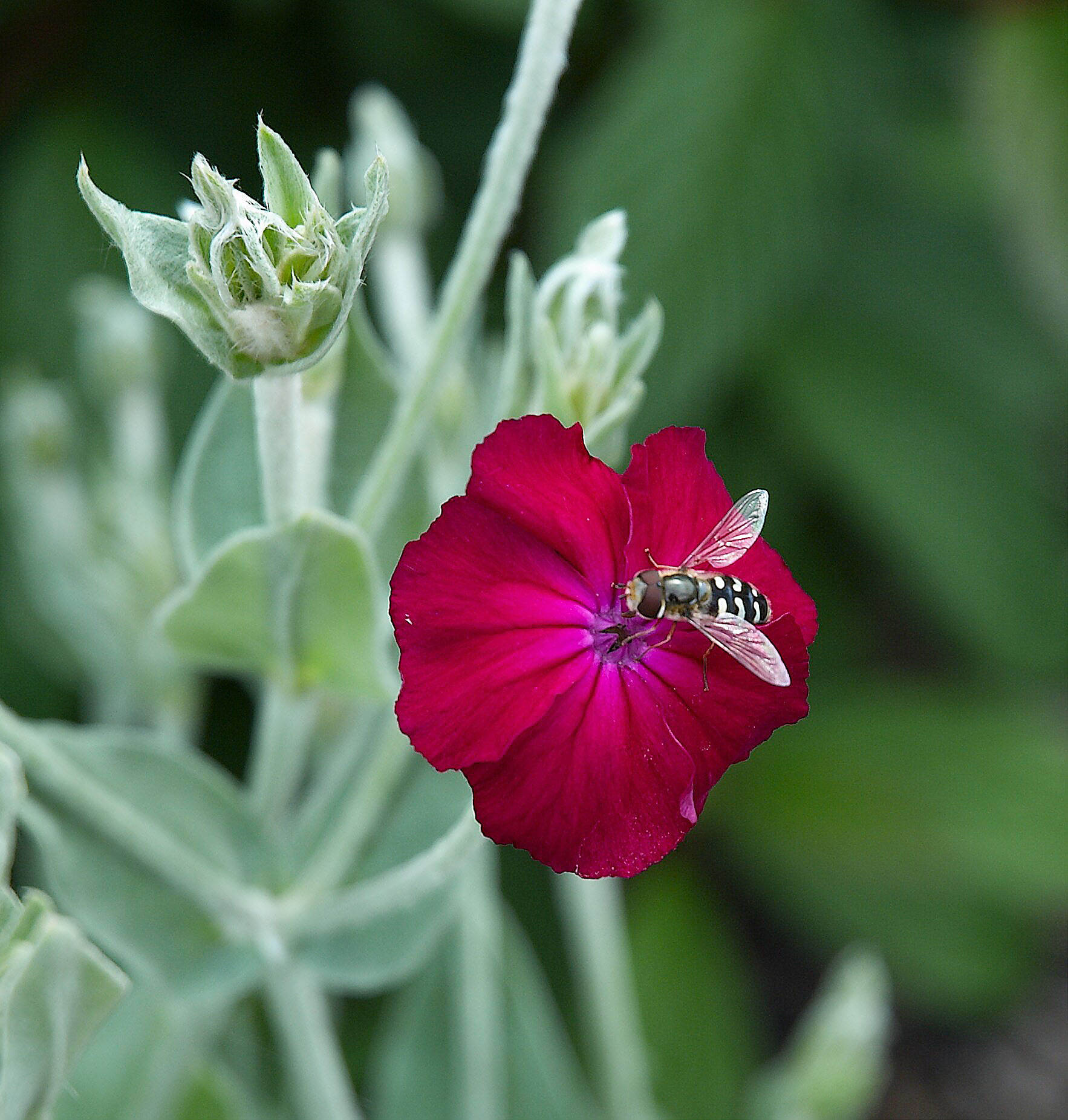

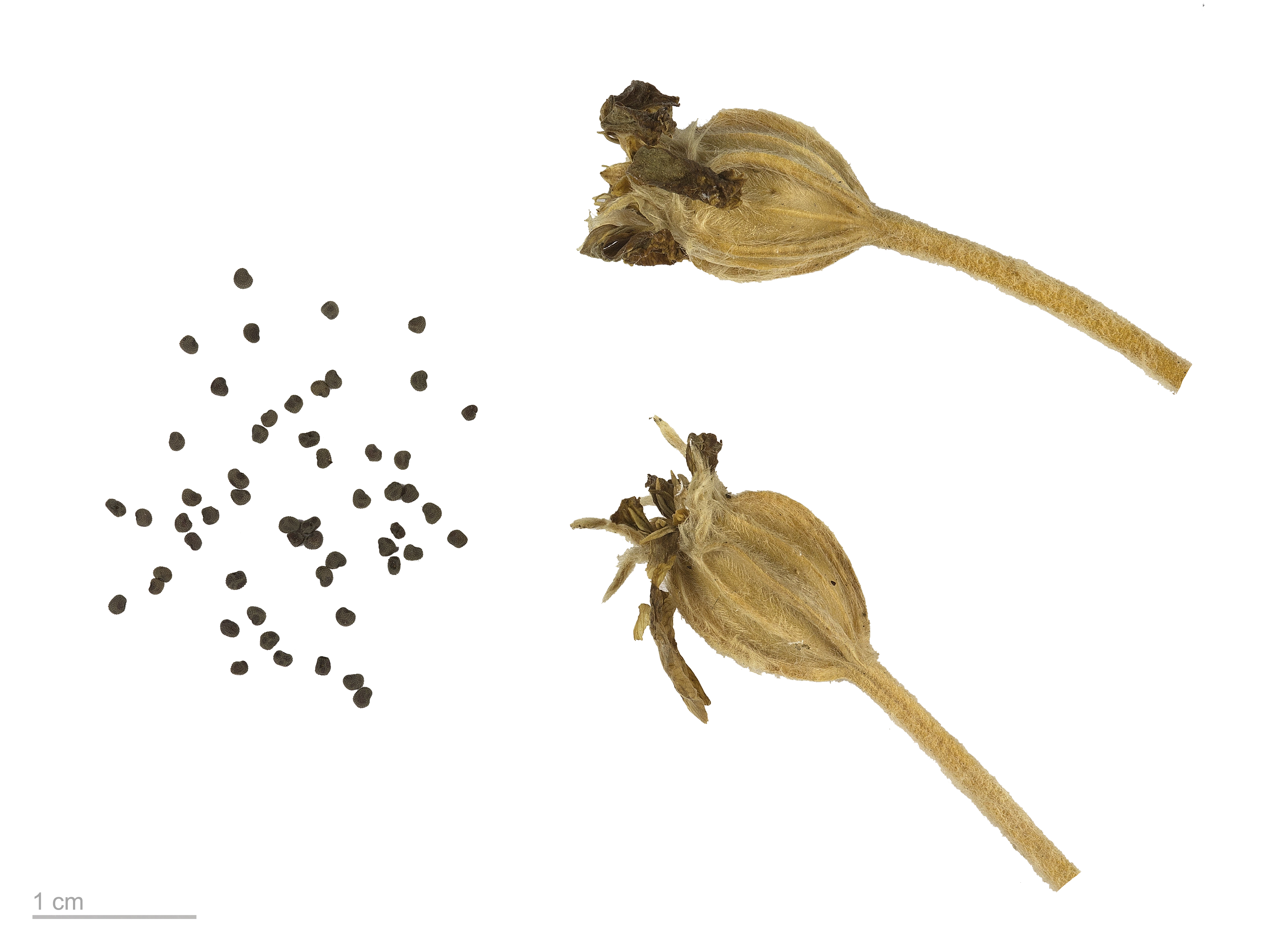
