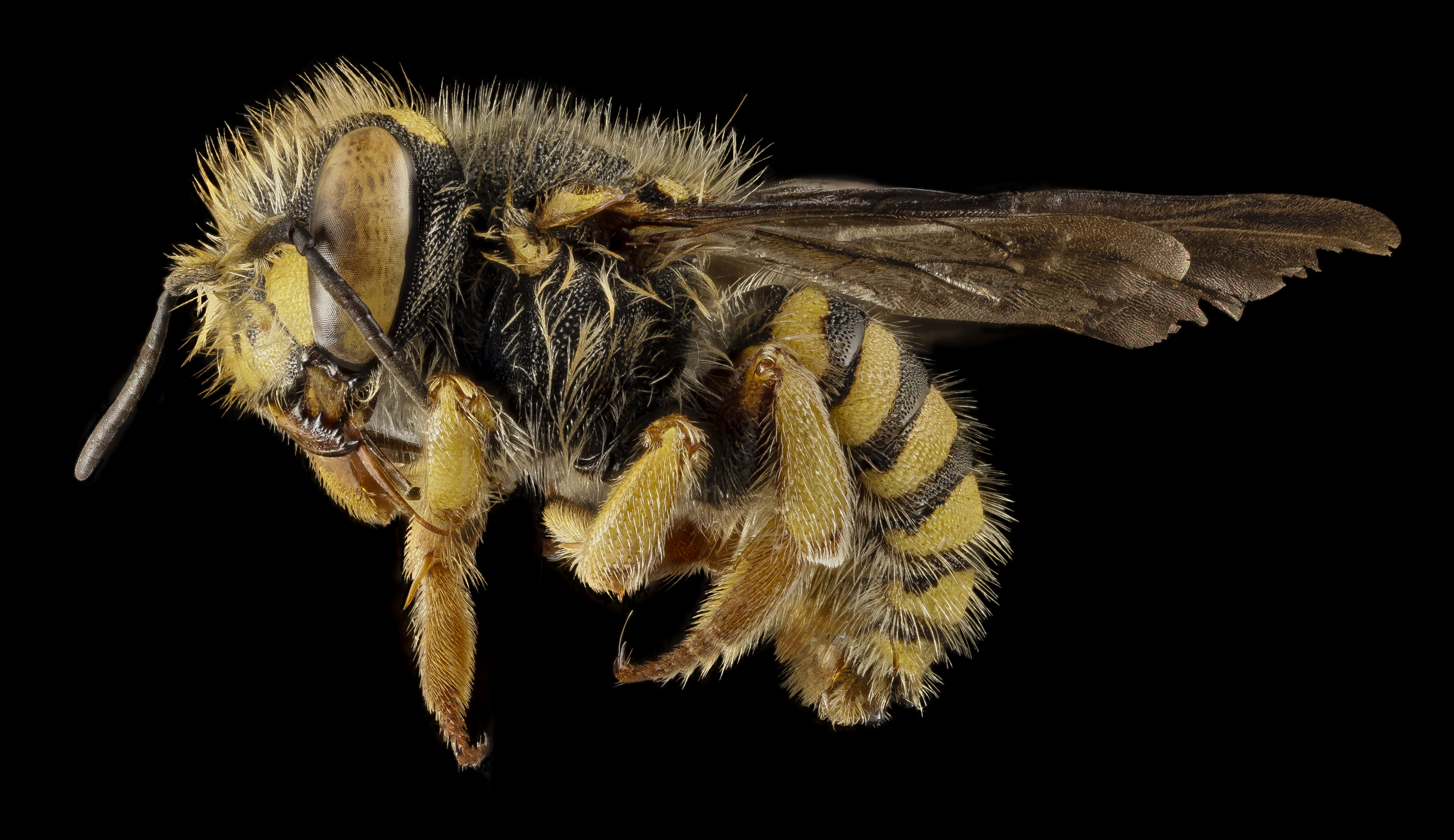

Scientific classification
- Kingdom: Animalia
- Phylum: Arthropoda
- Clade: Pancrustacea
- Class: Insecta
- Order: Hymenoptera
- Family: Megachilidae
- Genus: Anthidium
- Species: A. oblongatum

Binomial name
- Anthidium oblongatum (Illiger, 1806)

Synonyms
- A. oblongatum synonymy: Apis manicata Linnaeus, 1798 (homonym); Anthophora oblongata Illiger, 1806; Anthidium oblongatum australe Alfken, 1937; Anthidium oblongatum xanthurum Cockerell, 1925; Anthidium oblongatum var flavens Moczar, 1956; Anthidium oblongatum var luteum Dusmet, 1915 (homonym); Anthidium oblongatum var nigrum Friese, 1897; Anthidium trochantericum Morawitz, 1893; Anthidium (Proanthidium) oblongatum berberum Warncke, 1980; Proanthidium tornense Tkalců, 1966

= Anthidium oblongatum =

Species of bee

Anthidium oblongatum, the oblong woolcarder bee, is a species of bee in the family Megachilidae, the leaf-cutter, carder, or mason bees. It is native to Eurasia and north Africa, and has also been introduced to North America.

== Range ==
This species is found in Eurasia from Portugal via southern, central and eastern Europe, Ukraine, southern Russia and Siberia (east to Tuva) as well as via Asia Minor, the Caucasus to the Central Asian mountains and, if the information from Wu (2006) applies, to Inner Mongolia . In Europe, it is found northwards to the Netherlands, Brandenburg, central Poland and Belarus; south to Sicily (not in Corsica and Sardinia), Thessaly (not in Crete and Cyprus), Iran and Afghanistan. It has also been reported in Morocco. It was found introduced to the eastern United States in 1995, and can now be found throughout northeastern North America, Colorado, Utah, and the Pacific Northwest of North America.

== Habitat ==
A. oblongatum prefers warm and dry locations such as flowering grasslands, hedges, and dry stone walls. It can also be found in ruderal sites such as weathering heaps, road embankments, railway embankments, flood dams, also in the settlement area (flowering fallow areas, rock gardens). The nesting sites are often spatially separated from the pollen sources and nesting props. From the lowlands to the montane elevation.

== Ecology ==
The flight period is in one generation from mid-June to early August.

A. oblongatum uses cavities to create the nest. Wherever 5–6 mm wide, horizontal crevices are available (dry stone walls, slatey, weathered rocks), these are preferred to be populated. But other cavities also serve as nesting places, for example passage-like cavities in the house, which are also used by Anthidium manicatum. The brood cells are made from vegetable wool. The species populates gardens, especially those that also have suitable food plants and sources of building material. A. oblongatum dabs the outside of the nest with rust-colored glandular secretions. A. oblongatum is found almost exclusively on Fabaceae, especially on Lotus spec. or Onobrychis spec., on Crassulaceae, especially Sempervivum spec. and Sedum spec. or on Resedaceae collecting pollen. Lotus corniculatus, Onobrychis viciifolia and Sedum reflexum are preferred.

Parasites: In France, Stelis punctulatissima was raised from a nest of A. oblongatum. Another breeding parasite, according to observations from Germany and Switzerland, is very likely to be Chrysis marginata.

== Etymology ==
From Latin "oblongatum" = "elongated, elongated"; Illiger does not provide any information on choosing the name.

== Taxonomy ==
Subgenus Proanthidium Friese, 1898

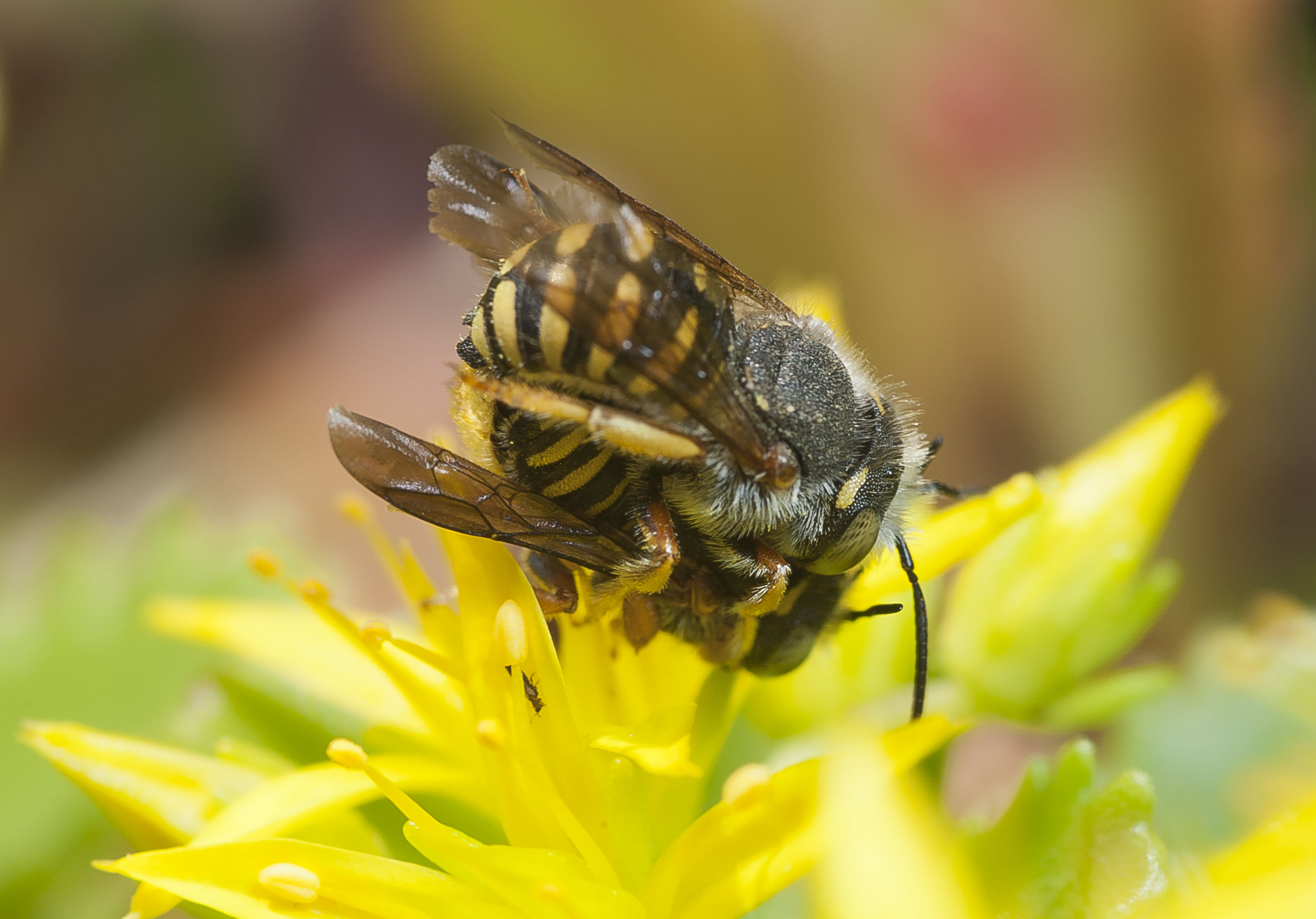
Copula

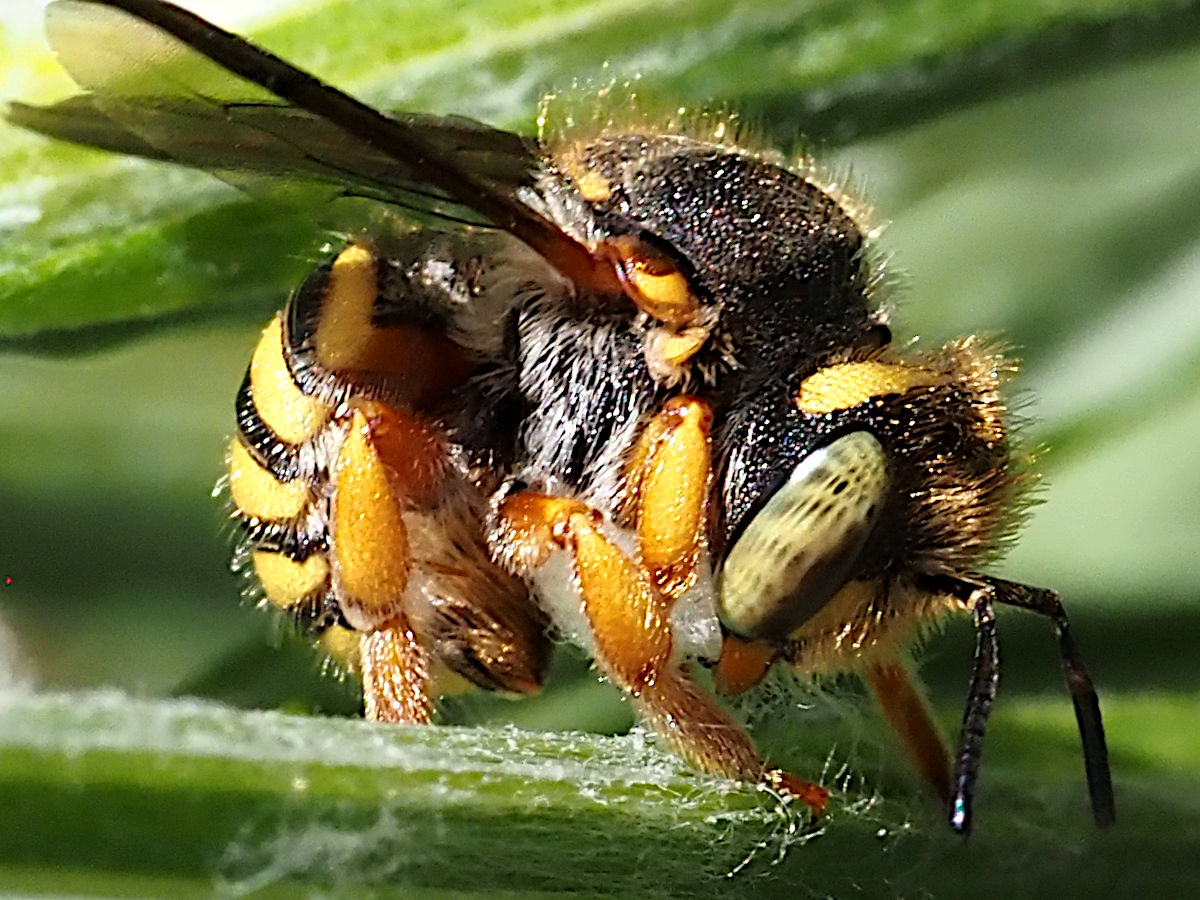
Carding wool
