= Dusty the Klepto Kitty =

Cat notorious for bringing home stolen items

Dusty
- Other name: Dusty the Klepto Kitty
- Species: Felis catus
- Breed: Siamese
- Sex: Male
- Born: March 20, 2006; San Mateo, California, U.S.
- Died: March 3, 2023 (aged 16); California, U.S.
- Years active: 2008–2023
- Owners: Jean Chu and Jim Coleman

Dusty the Klepto Kitty was a Siamese cat who gained notoriety in early 2011 for his acts of "cat burglary." As of his February 2011 appearance on the Late Show with David Letterman, Dusty had stolen 16 car wash mitts, 7 sponges, 213 dish towels, 7 wash cloths, 5 towels, 18 shoes, 73 socks, 100 gloves, 1 pair of mittens, 3 aprons, 40 balls, 4 pairs of underwear, 1 dog collar, 6 rubber toys, 1 blanket, 3 leg warmers, 2 Frisbees, 1 golf club head cover, 1 safety mask, 2 mesh bags, 1 bag of water balloons, 1 pair of pajama pants, 8 bathing suits, and 8 other "miscellaneous" objects.

He earned the nickname Klepto Kitty after bringing home more than 600 items from the gardens he prowled at night. His owners claim that his record spree garnered eleven separate items, and he was once even caught on camera carrying home a bra.

== Early years ==
Born on March 20, 2006, Dusty was a black point and white Domestic Shorthair who lived in San Mateo, California. He was adopted from the Peninsula Humane Society by Jean Chu and Jim Coleman.

His first two years of life were uneventful. However, in 2008, his owners began to notice household objects that did not belong to them appearing in strange places. They began to suspect that their cat was bringing them home; that they were eventually able to confirm the suspicion.

== Notoriety ==
Although his thievery began in 2008, Dusty didn't receive much notoriety outside of his neighborhood until the Animal Planet show Must Love Cats aired a profile of him in February 2011. The "Must Love Cats" crew was able to set up a motion-triggered night vision camera and catch Dusty in the act of bringing home his spoils. The Animal Planet report led to a February 14, 2011, story by Vic Lee of KGO-TV of San Francisco, and Dusty's appearance on the Late Show with David Letterman on February 22, 2011.

== Cultural relevance ==
Since his appearances on Letterman and other national news outlets, Dusty became a minor national and international celebrity. He has appeared at many community events in the San Francisco Bay Area and has made appearances on many national and international news outlets. He served as the grand marshal of the Redwood City Pet Parade in May 2011 and appeared at a fundraiser for the Peninsula Humane Society in June 2011.

Because of the kitty-cam footage for the Animal Planet documentary, Dusty's behavior became a bonus feature in a three-minute short on the DVD release for the 2011 movie Puss in Boots. It is entitled Klepto Kitty.

Because Dusty was an adoptee from the Peninsula Humane Society animal shelter, he made a celebrity appearance at their annual adopt-a-thon in June 2011. Some of his unclaimed stolen items were displayed and sold.

To keep his fans up to date with his finds, his owners maintained his Facebook page and provided pictures of the items that Dusty brought home.

== See also ==
- List of individual cats
