= Peninsula Humane Society =

Animal organization

Peninsula Humane Society & SPCA
- Abbreviation: PHS/SPCA
- Formation: 1950; 76 years ago
- Tax ID no.: 94-1243665
- Headquarters: 1450 Rollins Road; Burlingame, CA
- Coordinates: 37.5926°N 122.3686°W
- Services: animal shelter, adoption, spay/neuter, and training
- Website: phs-spca.org

The Peninsula Humane Society & SPCA (PHS/SPCA) is one of the largest humane organizations in the United States. Located in San Mateo County, California, it is a private non-profit charitable organization. It is an animal rescue (including wildlife rescue), rehabilitation and adoption operation with two locations. The Tom and Annette Lantos Center for Compassion, where adoptable animals are housed, is in the city of Burlingame and the older physical plant, which serves as the intake shelter, is located at Coyote Point in the city of San Mateo. PHS/SPCA has been responsible for considerable progress in the California Legislature with new humane laws in the state, especially since the late 1970s. PHS/SPCA has been characterized as a progressive and innovative humane organization.

== Services ==
Principal services offered are animal rescue, veterinary care of sick and injured animals, adoption services and humane education. A full-time staff of approximately 120 people are applied to these endeavors. Regarding animal rescue, PHS/SPCA operates a fleet of rescue trucks and vans and has associated personnel trained in wildlife rescue as well as pickup of stray domestic animals. In house veterinary care is available for intake animals who are injured or infirm. In 2005, approximately 15,000 animals were taken in, among whom all the medically suitable animals were thence adopted into qualified homes. Humane education has always been a strong part of the PHS/SPCA mission; a staff of trained docents are systematically sent out to virtually all of the schools in San Mateo County as well as other venues, a strong docent staff being a critical resource to PHS/SPCA. To supplement the full-time staff PHS/SPCA has approximately over 1,000 volunteers.

PHS/SPCA conducts animal control functions under contract with San Mateo County. Where needed, these activities are coordinated with local law enforcement personnel to insure basic animal care is not being withheld, and that pet owners are able and responsible to care for their animals.

PHS/SPCA also operates a low cost clinics for animal vaccination as well as spay and neuter functions. The Pet Assisted Therapy program uses docents who take pets to senior centers to provide animal contact and cheer to senior citizens, who would not otherwise have such an experience. PHS/SPCA has an on site wildlife animal care center that conducts classes in animal behavior as well as a seasonal kitten nursery.

== Policies ==
The Peninsula Humane Society & SPCA has been a force in humane education since the early 1970s. In the mid-1980s PHS/SPCA the Board of Directors embarked on a substantial campaign to create policies on animal welfare, which were promulgated to enhance animal care within the county and also influenced state and national awareness of animal care. Topics of policy addressed included humane treatment of farm animals, policies on trophy hunting, spaying/neutering and other medical procedures on pets. The organization has been active in promoting awareness of the need for pet population control, through spay and neuter programs as well as finding homes for animals.

California Civil Code Section 1834.4 and Penal Code Section 599d, enacted January 1, 1999 as part of the Hayden Act, define adoptable and treatable animals and make it state policy that no adoptable or treatable animal should be euthanized. PHS has an "Open Door" policy which accepts all animals brought in for help, regardless of health, age, behavior or species; PHS guarantees that 100% of the healthy, adoptable cats and dogs received will be placed in homes.

== History and governance ==
The Peninsula Humane Society & SPCA, governed by a board of directors, has existed for over 50 years. The Board hires a President who assembles and directs the staff.
