= The Sword discography =

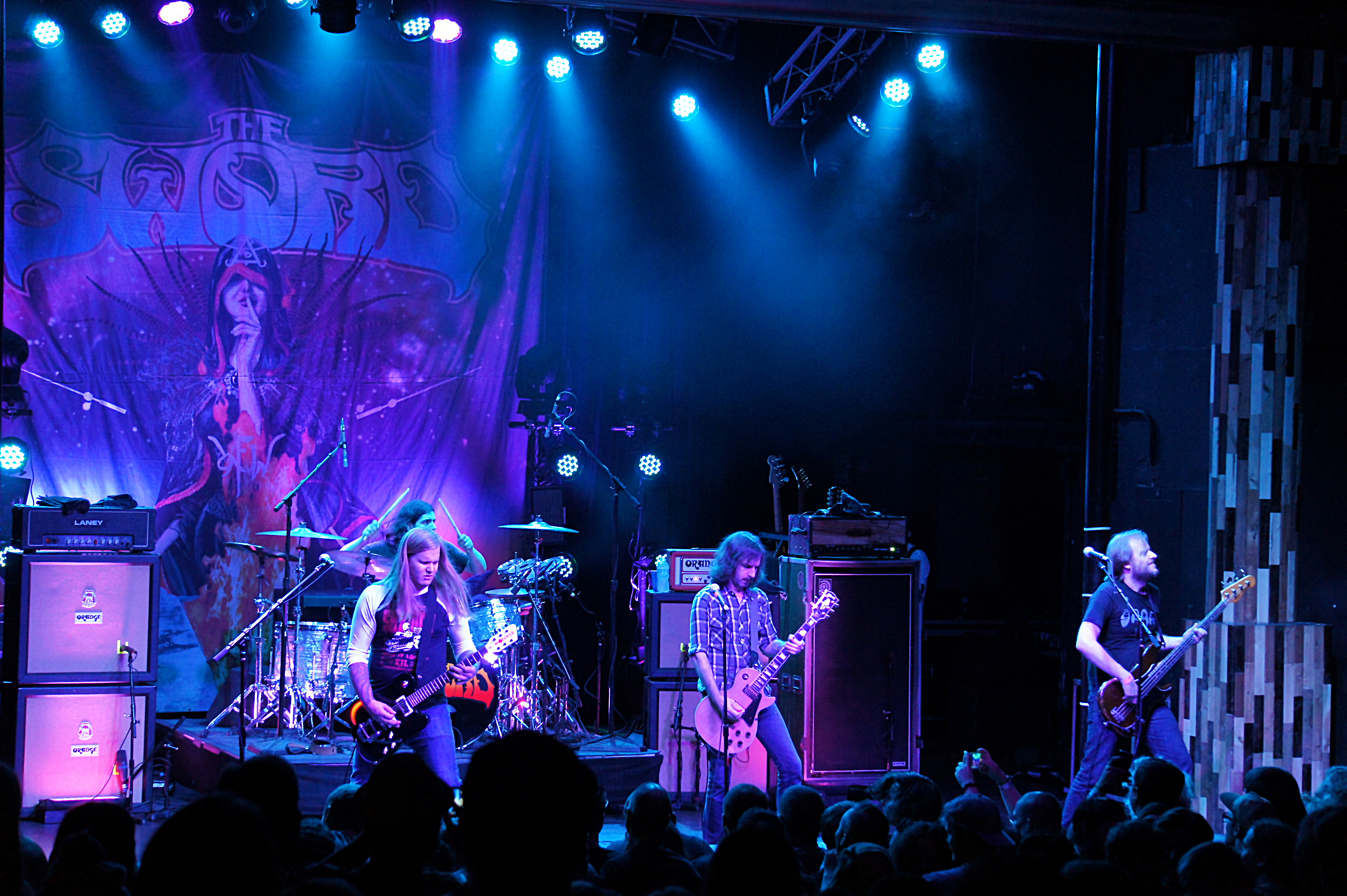
- The Sword performing live in 2013
- Studio albums: 6
- Extended plays: 2
- Live albums: 1
- Compilation albums: 3
- Singles: 13
- Music videos: 11
- Split releases: 3

The discography of The Sword, an American heavy metal band, consists of six studio albums, one live album, three compilation albums, one extended play (EP), three split releases, 13 singles and ten music videos. Originally formed in Austin, Texas in 2003 by vocalist and guitarist John D. Cronise with guitarist Kyle Shutt, bassist Bryan Richie and drummer Trivett Wingo, the band signed with Kemado Records in 2005 and released debut album Age of Winters the following year. "Freya" was released as a single in 2007, followed by a split EP with Swedish band Witchcraft featuring new track "Sea of Spears" and a cover version of Led Zeppelin's "Immigrant Song".

In 2008 the band released Gods of the Earth, which reached number 102 on the US Billboard 200. "Fire Lances of the Ancient Hyperzephyrians" was released as its sole single. In March 2010, the band released a split single with Year Long Disaster, which was followed in August by Warp Riders. The album was supported by the release of two singles – "Tres Brujas" and "(The Night the Sky Cried) Tears of Fire" – as well as a trilogy of music videos. Warp Riders peaked at number 42 on the Billboard 200, as well as reaching the top ten of the Hard Rock Albums, Independent Albums and Tastemaker Albums charts.

With new drummer Santiago "Jimmy" Vela III and new label Razor & Tie, the Sword returned with its fourth studio album Apocryphon in October 2012. It was the band's first to reach the US top 20, peaking at number 17, as well as the first to reach the top ten of the Top Rock Albums chart at a peak position of number 4. The band's fifth album High Country was released in August 2015, charting in the US at number 30, with the acoustic companion album Low Country released the following year reaching the top ten of the US Billboard Hard Rock Albums chart. The Sword's first live album Greetings From... was released in May 2017.

In March 2018, the band released its sixth studio album Used Future. The album debuted at number 104 on the Billboard 200, the lowest position in the band's career since Age of Winters had failed to chart. It also reached number 6 on the Hard Rock Albums chart and number 16 on the Top Rock Albums chart. After a two-year hiatus, the Sword is set to return in 2020 with two compilations: Conquest of Kingdoms and Chronology: 2006–2018.

== Albums ==
=== Studio albums ===
List of studio albums with selected chart positions
| Title | Album details | Peak chart positions | | | | | | | | | |
| Title | Album details | US | US Hard | US Indie | US Rock | US Taste | AUS | GER | UK | UK Indie | UK Rock |
|---|---|---|---|---|---|---|---|---|---|---|---|
| Age of Winters | Released: February 14, 2006; Label: Kemado; Formats: CD, LP, DL | — | — | — | — | — | — | — | — | — | — |
| Gods of the Earth | Released: March 31, 2008; Label: Kemado; Formats: CD, LP, DL | 102 | 14 | 11 | — | 5 | — | — | — | 12 | 30 |
| Warp Riders | Released: August 19, 2010; Label: Kemado; Formats: CD, LP, DL | 42 | 5 | 8 | 15 | 6 | — | — | — | 26 | 20 |
| Apocryphon | Released: October 22, 2012; Label: Razor & Tie; Formats: CD, LP, CS, DL | 17 | 2 | 3 | 4 | 5 | — | — | — | 47 | 21 |
| High Country | Released: August 21, 2015; Label: Razor & Tie; Formats: CD, LP, CS, DL | 30 | 4 | — | 7 | 5 | 74 | 91 | 128 | 13 | 11 |
| Used Future | Released: March 23, 2018; Label: Razor & Tie; Formats: CD, LP, CS, DL | 104 | 6 | — | 16 | 4 | — | — | — | — | 25 |
"—" denotes a release that did not register on that chart.

=== Live albums ===
List of live albums with selected chart positions
| Title | Album details | Peaks | |
| Title | Album details | US Hard Sales | US Rock Sales |
|---|---|---|---|
| Greetings From... | Released: May 5, 2017; Label: Razor & Tie; Formats: CD, LP, DL | 10 | 43 |

=== Compilations ===
List of compilation albums with selected chart positions
| Title | Album details | Peak positions | | | |
| Title | Album details | US Curr. | US Hard | US Rock | US Taste |
|---|---|---|---|---|---|
| Low Country | Released: September 23, 2016; Label: Razor & Tie; Formats: CD, LP, DL | 97 | 10 | 32 | 24 |
| Conquest of Kingdoms | Released: June 5, 2020; Label: Craft; Formats: 3LP, DL | — | — | — | — |
| Chronology: 2006–2018 | Released: June 5, 2020; Label: Craft; Format: 3CD | — | — | — | — |

== Extended plays ==
List of extended plays
| Title | Album details |
|---|---|
| iTunes Festival: London 2010 | Released: July 14, 2010; Label: Kemado; Format: DL |
| Conquest of Quarantine | Released: 2024; Label: Try Hard Ltd; Format: 12" vinyl |

== Split releases ==
List of split releases
| Title | Release details |
|---|---|
| Untitled split with Witchcraft (split with Witchcraft) | Released: November 13, 2007; Label: Kemado; Format: 12" vinyl |
| "Cold Sweat/Maiden, Mother & Crone" (split with Year Long Disaster) | Released: March 15, 2010; Label: Volcom; Format: 7" vinyl |
| "Tonight We Bleed/Turnt to Dust" (split with The Black Angels) | Released: September 2017; Label: Cardinal Press; Format: 7" vinyl |

== Singles ==
List of singles, showing year released and album name
| Title | Year | Album |
|---|---|---|
| "Freya" | 2007 | Age of Winters |
| "Fire Lances of the Ancient Hyperzephyrians" | 2008 | Gods of the Earth |
| "Tres Brujas" | 2010 | Warp Riders |
| "(The Night the Sky Cried) Tears of Fire" | 2010 | Warp Riders |
| "Hammer of Heaven" | 2012 | non-album single |
| "The Hidden Masters/Arcane Montane" | 2014 | Apocryphon |
| "High Country" | 2015 | High Country |
| "John the Revelator" | 2016 | non-album single |
| "Seriously Mysterious" (acoustic) | 2016 | Low Country |
| "Maiden, Mother & Crone" (live) | 2017 | Greetings From... |
| "Deadly Nightshade" | 2018 | Used Future |
| "Twilight Sunrise" | 2018 | Used Future |
| "Freya" (live at Stubb's, 2011) | 2020 | Conquest of Kingdoms |

== Music videos ==
List of music videos, showing year released and director(s)
| Title | Year | Director(s) | Ref. |
|---|---|---|---|
| "Winter's Wolves" | 2006 | David Foote | |
| "Freya" | 2006 | Barnaby Roper | |
| "Fire Lances of the Ancient Hyperzephyrians" | 2008 | Michael Colao, Josh Litwhiler | |
| "Maiden, Mother & Crone" | 2008 | Artificial Army | |
| "How Heavy This Axe" | 2008 | Super!Alright! | |
| "Tres Brujas" | 2010 | Artificial Army | |
| "Lawless Lands" | 2010 | Artificial Army | |
| "Night City" | 2011 | Artificial Army | |
| "The Veil of Isis" | 2012 | Simon Chan | |
| "Cloak of Feathers" | 2013 | Rich Ragsdale | |
| "Used Future" | 2018 | Rooster Teeth | |
