= List of songs recorded by the Sword =

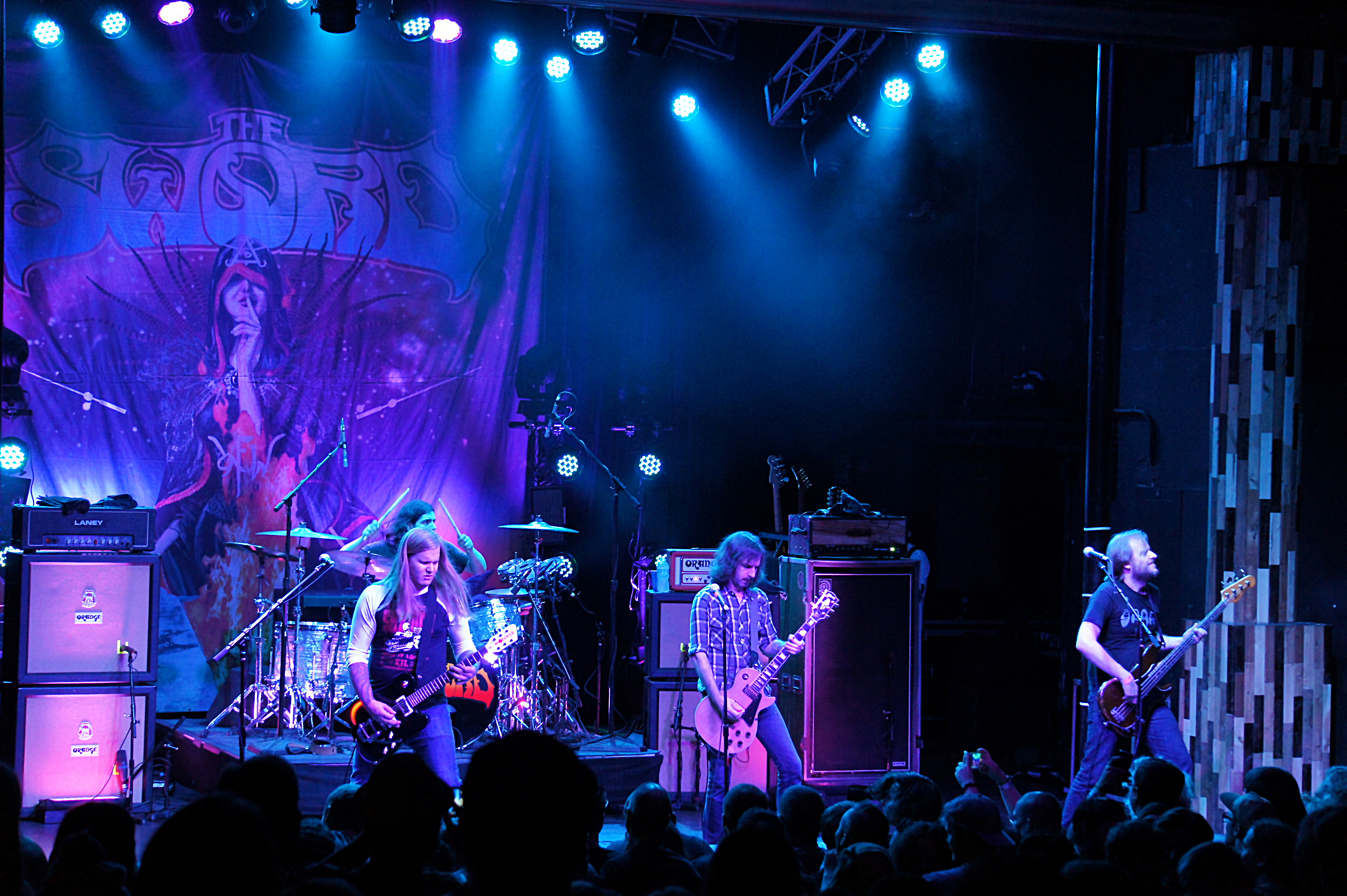
The current lineup of The Sword comprises Kyle Shutt, Santiago "Jimmy" Vela III, J. D. Cronise and Bryan Richie.

The Sword is an American heavy metal band formed in Austin, Texas in 2003. The band released its debut album Age of Winters in 2006; the songs on the album were largely written by frontman J. D. Cronise before the band's formation, although the musical compositions were credited to the band as a whole. In 2007 the band contributed the track "Sea of Spears" to a split extended play (EP) with Swedish band Witchcraft, which was credited to Cronise and guitarist Kyle Shutt, as well as a cover version of Led Zeppelin's "Immigrant Song". In 2008 the band released its second album Gods of the Earth, which was again credited to Cronise (lyrics) and the band as a whole (music), as well as the single "Fire Lances of the Ancient Hyperzephyrians" which featured the previously unreleased track "Codex Corvidae" as the B-side.

After contributing a cover version of Thin Lizzy's "Cold Sweat" to a split single with Year Long Disaster in March, The Sword released its third studio album Warp Riders in August 2010, the music for which was credited to Cronise and Shutt. Second single "(The Night the Sky Cried) Tears of Fire" featured another previously unreleased track as a B-side, "Farstar". The band signed with Razor & Tie in 2012, and released the non-album single "Hammer of Heaven" in May that year, a song written by Cronise during the sessions for Age of Winters. The band's fourth album Apocryphon, the first to feature drummer Santiago "Jimmy" Vela III, followed in October and returned to crediting the music to the whole band.

In 2024 the band contributed a cover of the track "Locomotive Breath" originally written by Jethro Tull to the album Aqualung Redux released through Magnetic Eye Records. It also featured guest musicians including intro piano played by Steve Moore from the band Zombi and flute played by Jason Frey. In review of the song Blabbermouth.net favorably said, "Like everything else on Aqualung Redux, it works brilliantly and shines fresh light" on the original song and album. Choosing to do an accurate reproduction of the original version Cronise, in an interview with Revolver said, "Those old records [are] so layered [with] all these parts. To dissect that and then reconstruct it was the challenge, rather than to reinterpret it." "Locomotive Breath" was a track that was constructed by being "patched together in the studio" by Jethro Tull. Anderson initially played a bass drum and hi-hat cymbal drum track, drummer Clive Bunker then layered tom-toms and cymbals to fill out the drum tracks. Keyboard player John Evan brought the piano section, that was used as the intro prologue, consisting of classical and jazz progressions to the pre-arranged song in which guitarist Martin Barre added blues guitar lines to.

== Songs ==
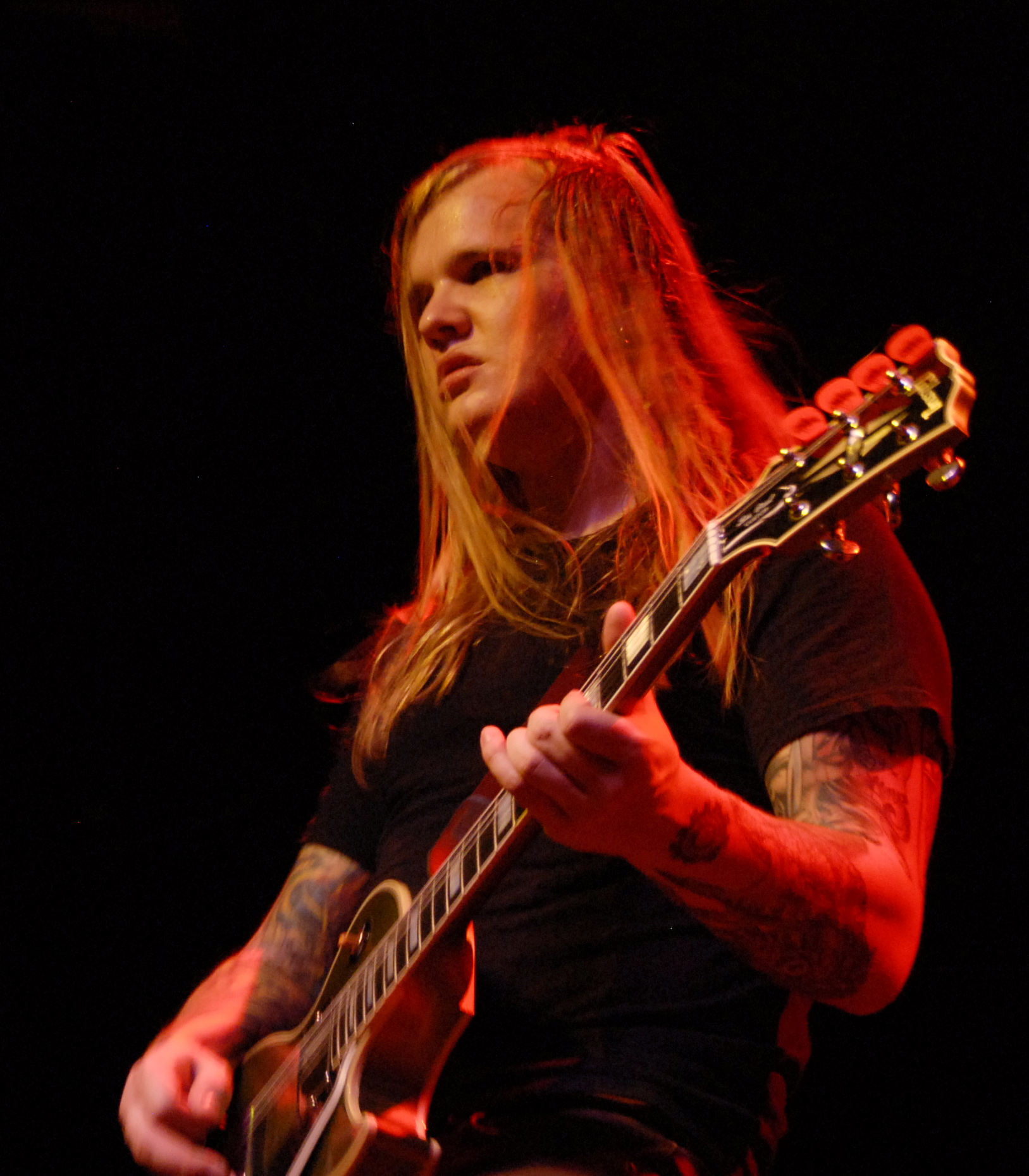
Guitarist Kyle Shutt was credited with co-composing Warp Riders.

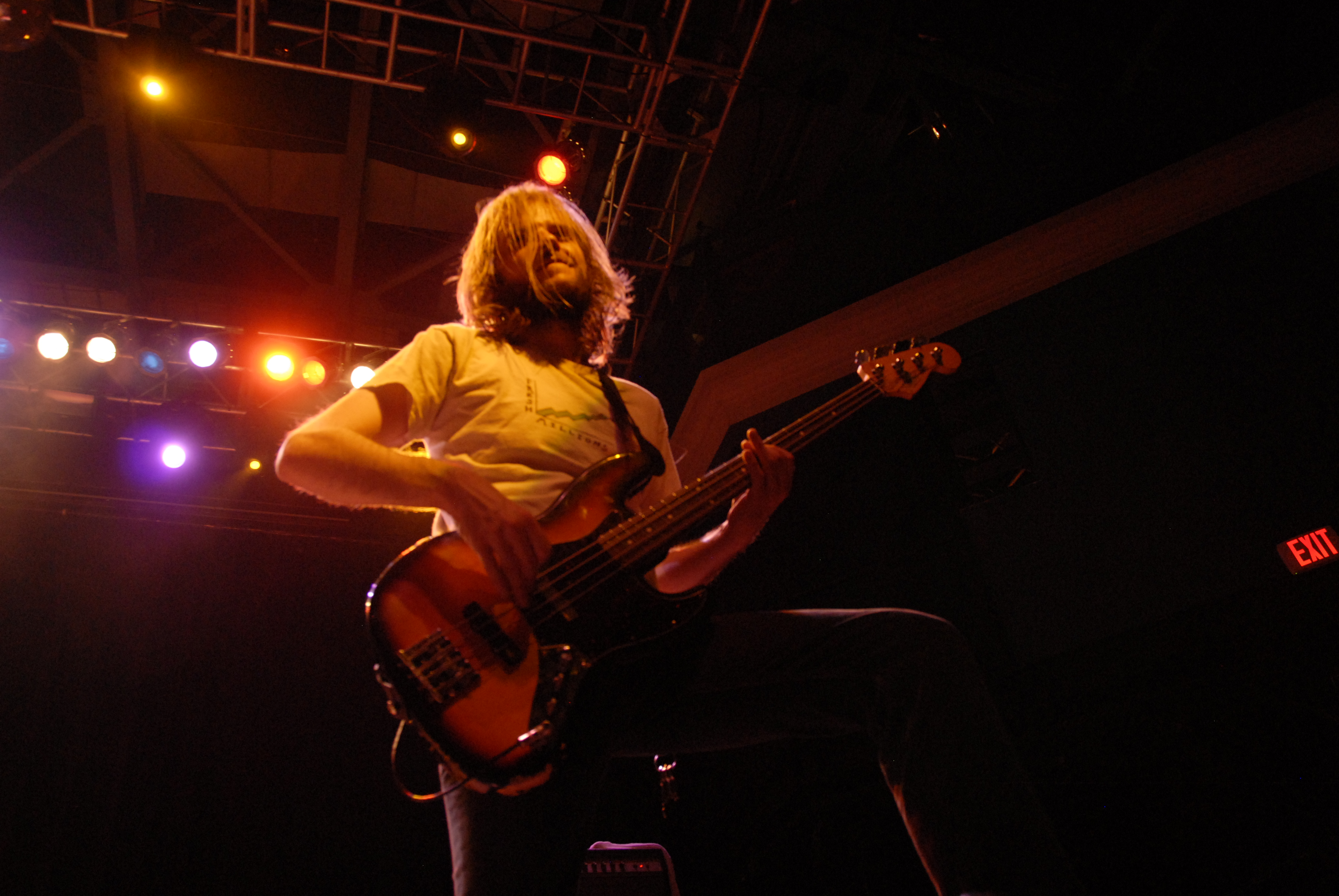
Bryan Richie also engineered the band's first two albums.

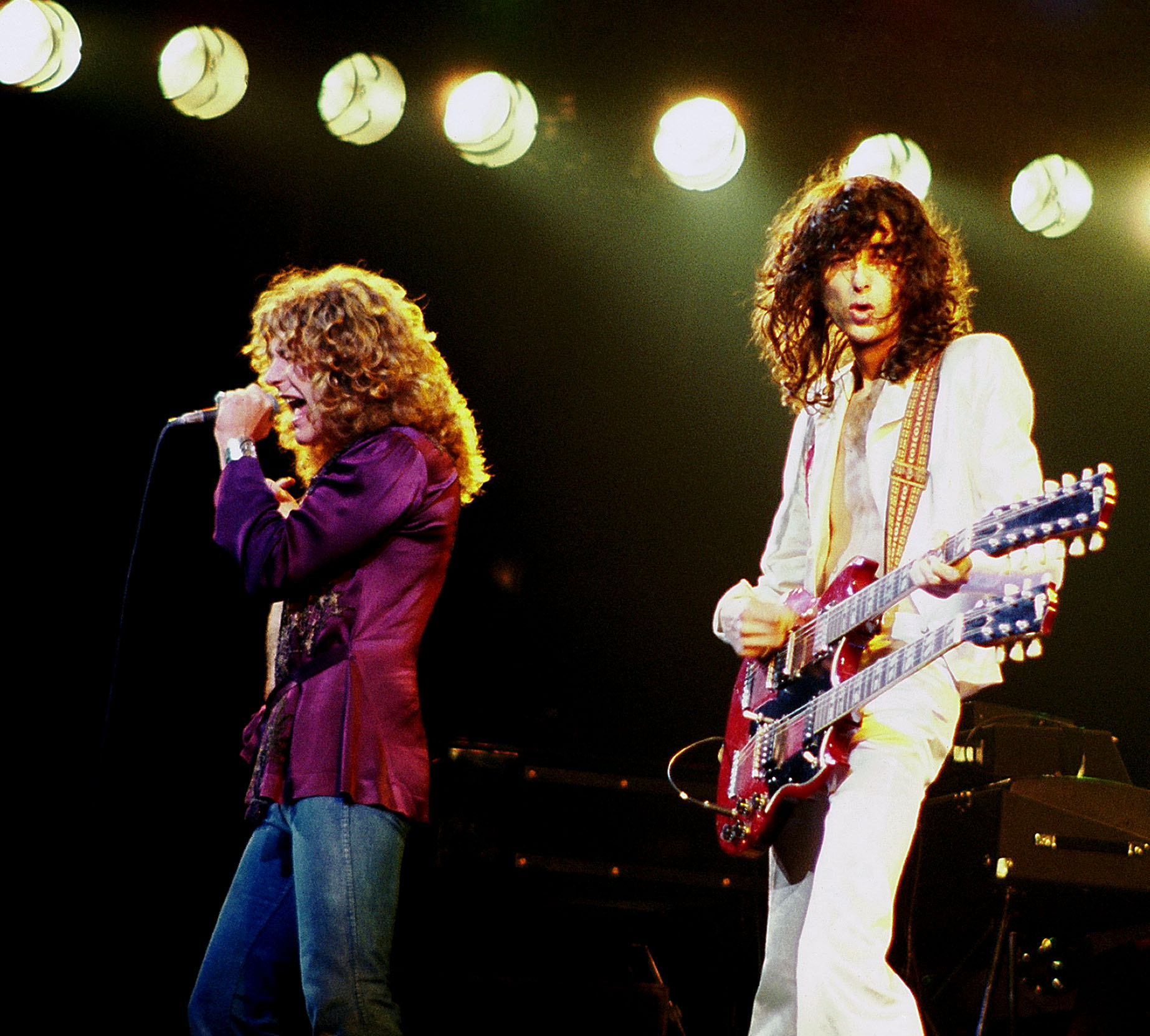
The Sword released a cover version of "Immigrant Song" by Led Zeppelin in 2007.

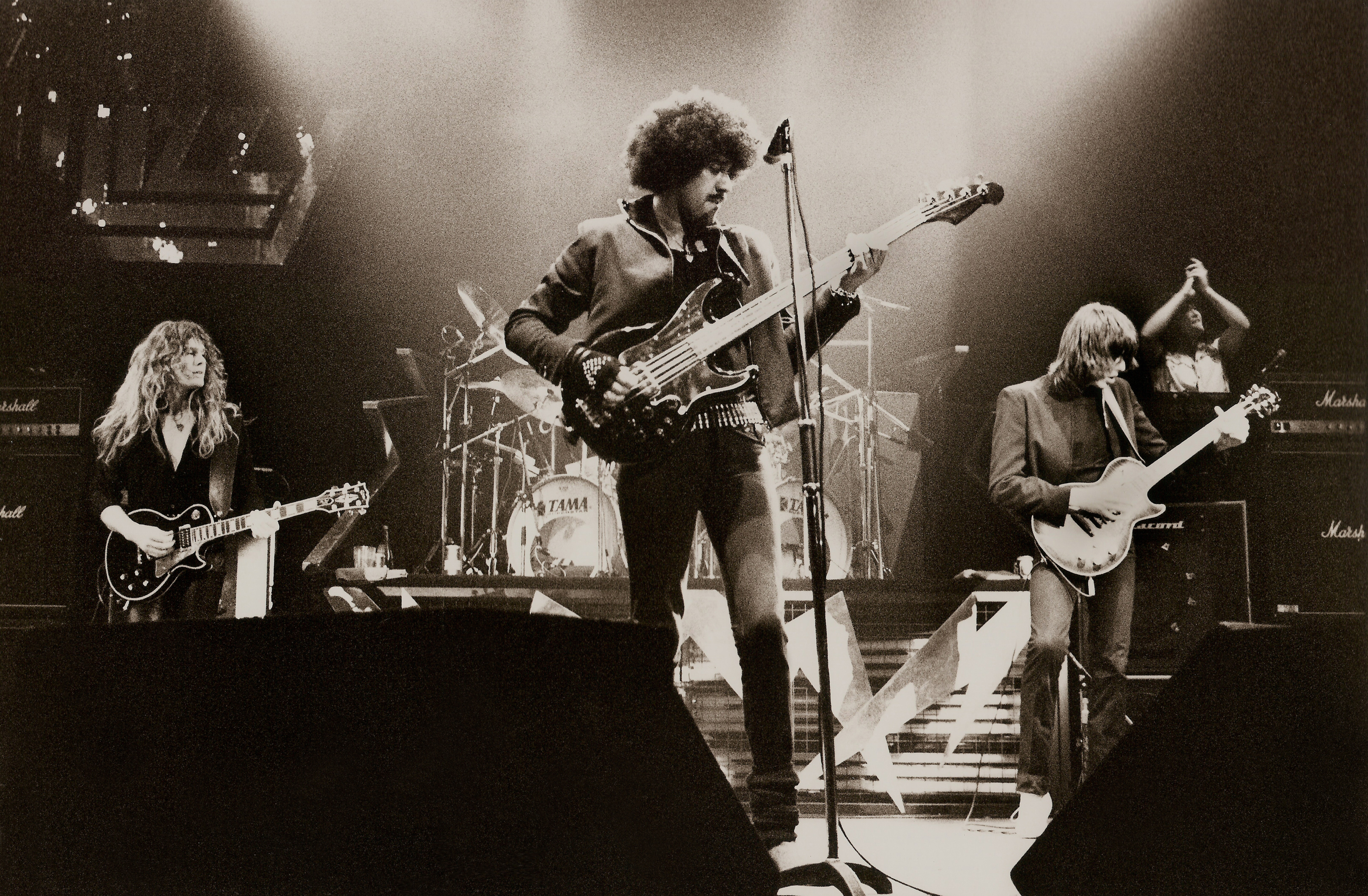
In 2010, the band released a cover of Thin Lizzy's "Cold Sweat".

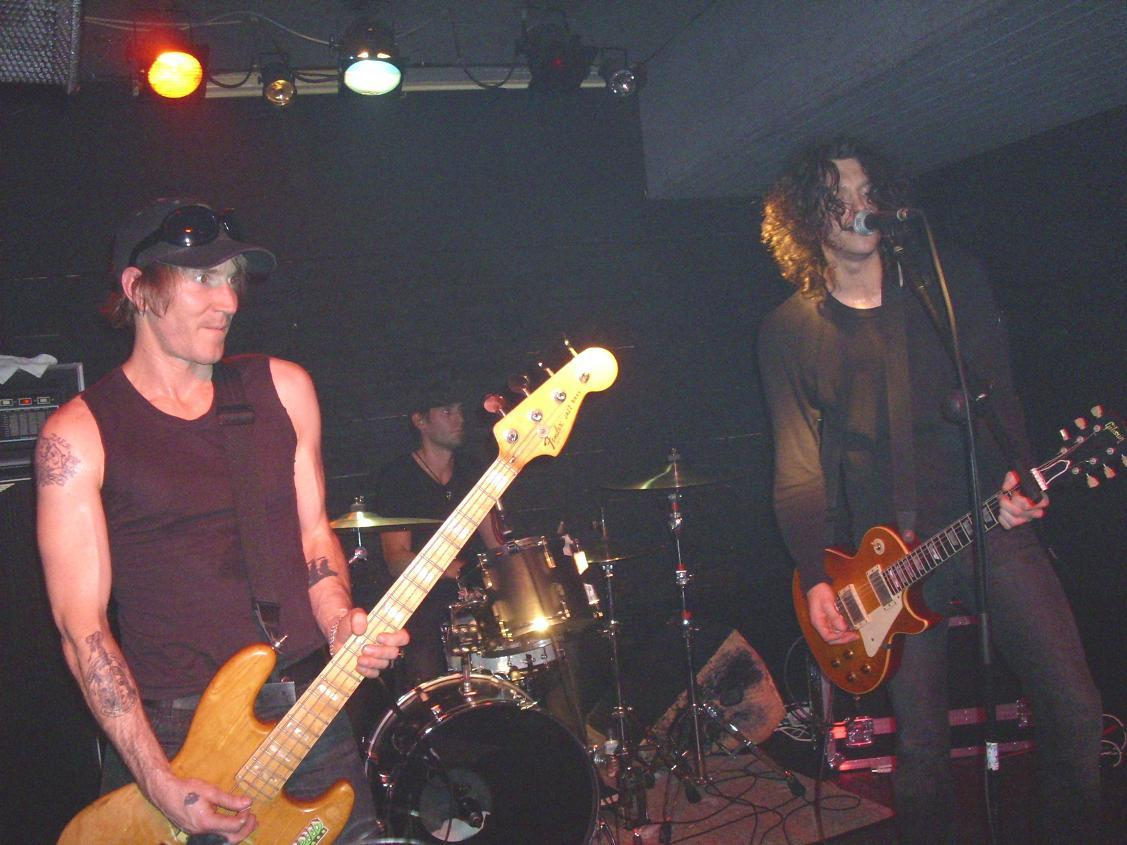
"Cold Sweat" was backed with a cover of "Maiden, Mother & Crone" by Year Long Disaster.

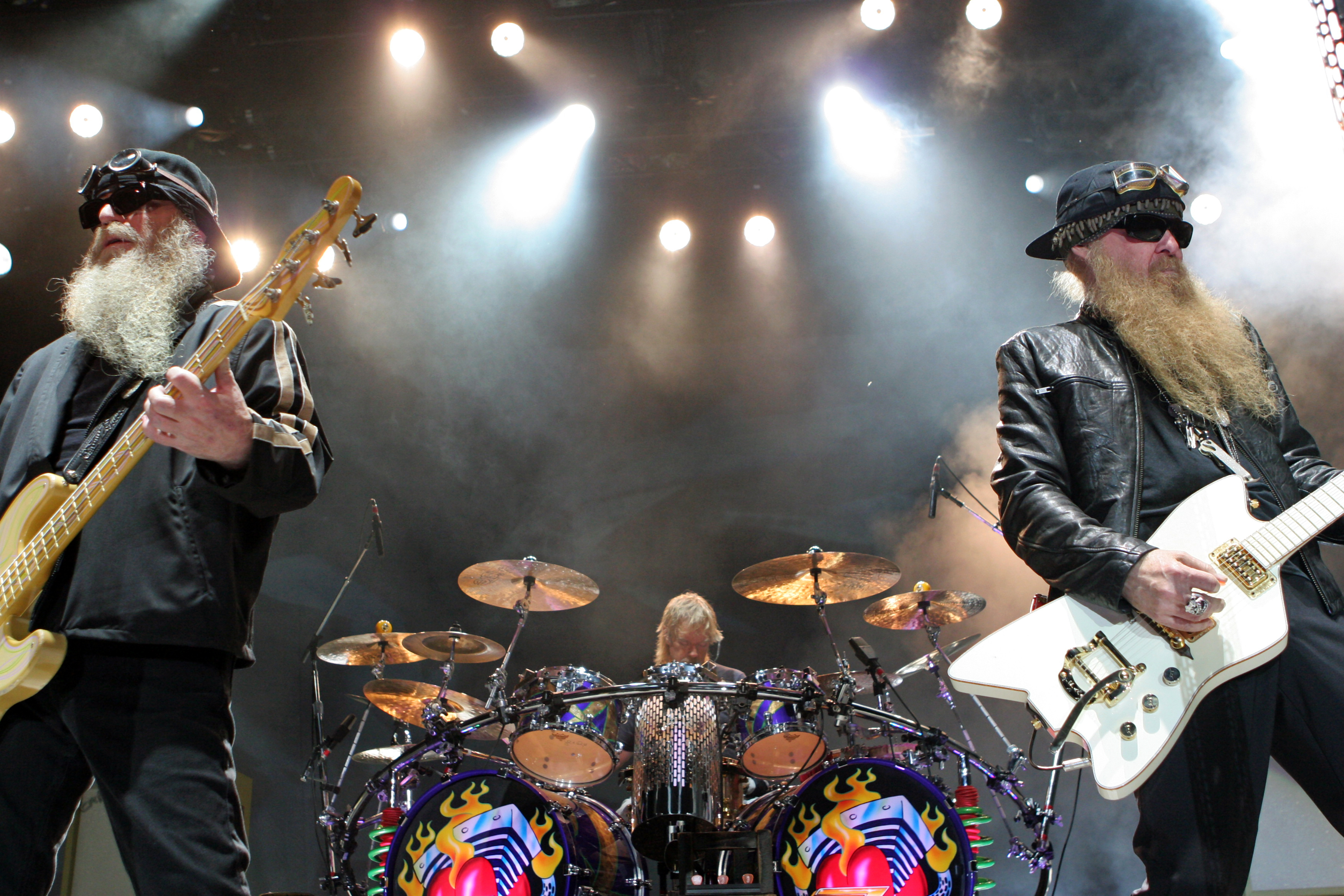
The band have has recorded cover versions of two ZZ Top songs as album bonus tracks.

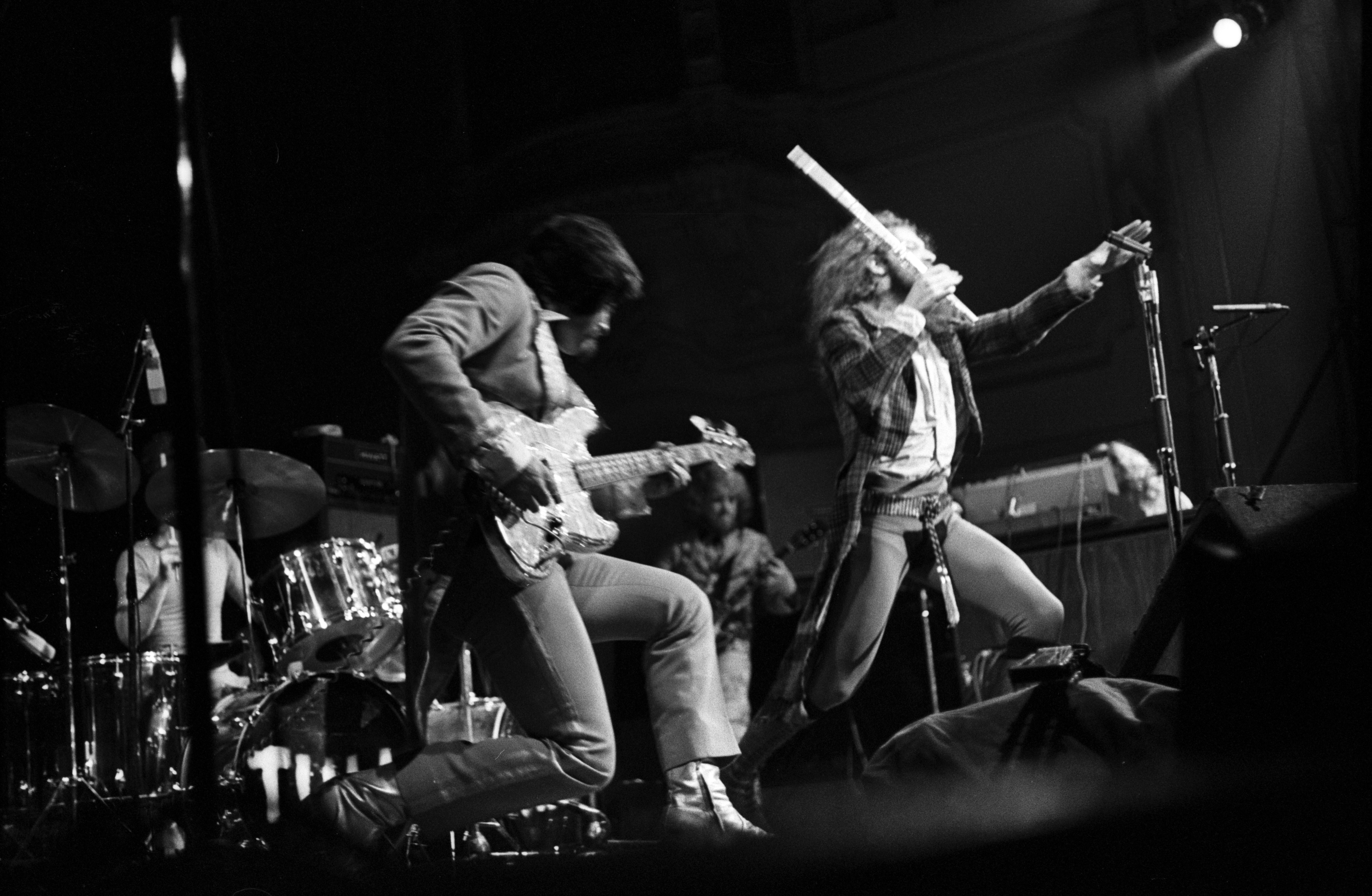
In 2024 the band contributed a cover version of "Locomotive Breath" to the Jethro Tull tribute album, Aqualung Redux.

Key
| † | Indicates song released as a single |
| ‡ | Indicates song written by the whole band |

| Song | Credited writer(s) | Release | Year | Ref. | Notes |
|---|---|---|---|---|---|
| "Acheron/Unearthing the Orb" | John D. Cronise | Warp Riders | 2010 | | |
| "Agartha" | John D. Cronise; Kyle Shutt; Bryan Richie; Santiago Vela ‡ | High Country | 2015 | | |
| "Apocryphon" | John D. Cronise; Kyle Shutt; Bryan Richie; Santiago Vela ‡ | Apocryphon | 2012 | | |
| "Arcane Montane" † | John D. Cronise; Kyle Shutt; Bryan Richie; Santiago Vela ‡ | Apocryphon | 2012 | | |
| "Arrows in the Dark" | John D. Cronise | Warp Riders | 2010 | | |
| "Astraea's Dream" | Kyle Shutt; Trivett Wingo | Warp Riders | 2010 | | |
| "Barael's Blade" | John D. Cronise; Kyle Shutt; Bryan Richie; Trivett Wingo ‡ | Age of Winters | 2006 | | |
| "The Bees of Spring" | John D. Cronise; Kyle Shutt; Bryan Richie; Santiago Vela ‡ | High Country | 2015 | | |
| "The Black River" | John D. Cronise; Kyle Shutt; Bryan Richie; Trivett Wingo ‡ | Gods of the Earth | 2008 | | |
| "Buzzards" | John D. Cronise; Kyle Shutt; Bryan Richie; Santiago Vela ‡ | High Country | 2015 | | |
| "Celestial Crown" | John D. Cronise; Kyle Shutt; Bryan Richie; Trivett Wingo ‡ | Age of Winters | 2006 | | |
| "Cheap Sunglasses" | Billy Gibbons; Dusty Hill; Frank Beard | Apocryphon | 2012 | | (Note: "Cheap Sunglasses", originally recorded by ZZ Top, was released as a bonus track on special editions of Apocryphon only.) |
| "The Chronomancer I: Hubris" | John D. Cronise; Kyle Shutt; Bryan Richie; Trivett Wingo ‡ | Warp Riders | 2010 | | |
| "The Chronomancer II: Nemesis" | John D. Cronise; Kyle Shutt; Bryan Richie; Trivett Wingo ‡ | Warp Riders | 2010 | | |
| "Cloak of Feathers" | John D. Cronise; Kyle Shutt; Bryan Richie; Santiago Vela ‡ | Apocryphon | 2012 | | |
| "Codex Corvidae" | John D. Cronise | "Fire Lances of the Ancient; Hyperzephyrians" | 2008 | | |
| "Cold Sweat" † | Phil Lynott; John Sykes | "Cold Sweat/Maiden, Mother & Crone" | 2010 | | (Note: "Cold Sweat" was originally recorded by Thin Lizzy.) |
| "Daughter of Dawn" | John D. Cronise; Kyle Shutt | Warp Riders | 2010 | | (Note: "Daughter of Dawn" was released as a bonus track on the Japanese edition of Warp Riders only.) |
| "The Dreamthieves" | John D. Cronise; Kyle Shutt; Bryan Richie; Santiago Vela ‡ | High Country | 2015 | | |
| "Dying Earth" | John D. Cronise; Kyle Shutt; Bryan Richie; Santiago Vela ‡ | Apocryphon | 2012 | | |
| "Early Snow" | John D. Cronise; Kyle Shutt; Bryan Richie; Santiago Vela ‡ | High Country | 2015 | | |
| "Ebethron" | John D. Cronise; Kyle Shutt; Bryan Richie; Trivett Wingo ‡ | Age of Winters | 2006 | | |
| "Empty Temples" | John D. Cronise; Kyle Shutt; Bryan Richie; Santiago Vela ‡ | High Country | 2015 | | |
| "Execrator" | John D. Cronise; Kyle Shutt; Bryan Richie; Santiago Vela ‡ | Apocryphon | 2012 | | |
| "Eyes of the Stormwitch" | John D. Cronise; Kyle Shutt; Bryan Richie; Santiago Vela ‡ | Apocryphon | 2012 | | |
| "Farstar" | none listed | "(The Night the Sky Cried); Tears of Fire" | 2010 | | |
| "Fire Lances of the Ancient Hyperzephyrians" † | John D. Cronise; Kyle Shutt; Bryan Richie; Trivett Wingo ‡ | Gods of the Earth | 2008 | | |
| "Freya" † | John D. Cronise; Kyle Shutt; Bryan Richie; Trivett Wingo ‡ | Age of Winters | 2006 | | |
| "The Frost-Giant's Daughter" | John D. Cronise; Kyle Shutt; Bryan Richie; Trivett Wingo ‡ | Gods of the Earth | 2008 | | |
| "Ghost Eye" | John D. Cronise; Kyle Shutt; Bryan Richie; Santiago Vela ‡ | High Country | 2015 | | |
| "Hammer of Heaven" † | John D. Cronise; Kyle Shutt; Bryan Richie; Santiago Vela ‡ | "Hammer of Heaven" | 2012 | | |
| "Hawks & Serpents" | John D. Cronise; Kyle Shutt; Bryan Richie; Santiago Vela ‡ | Apocryphon | 2012 | | |
| "He's Waiting" | Gerry Roslie | Gods of the Earth | 2008 | | (Note: "He's Waiting", originally recorded by The Sonics, was released as a bonus track on special editions of Gods of the Earth only.) |
| "Hexenringe" | none listed | "High Country" | 2015 | | |
| "The Hidden Masters" † | John D. Cronise; Kyle Shutt; Bryan Richie; Santiago Vela ‡ | Apocryphon | 2012 | | |
| "High Country" † | John D. Cronise; Kyle Shutt; Bryan Richie; Santiago Vela ‡ | High Country | 2015 | | |
| "The Horned Goddess" | John D. Cronise; Kyle Shutt; Bryan Richie; Trivett Wingo ‡ | Age of Winters | 2006 | | |
| "How Heavy This Axe" | John D. Cronise; Kyle Shutt; Bryan Richie; Trivett Wingo ‡ | Gods of the Earth | 2008 | | |
| "Immigrant Song" | Jimmy Page; Robert Plant | The Sword/Witchcraft | 2007 | | (Note: "Immigrant Song" was originally recorded by Led Zeppelin.) |
| "Iron Swan" | John D. Cronise; Kyle Shutt; Bryan Richie; Trivett Wingo ‡ | Age of Winters | 2006 | | |
| "Lament for the Aurochs" | John D. Cronise; Kyle Shutt; Bryan Richie; Trivett Wingo ‡ | Age of Winters | 2006 | | |
| "Lawless Lands" | John D. Cronise; Kyle Shutt | Warp Riders | 2010 | | |
| "Locomotive Breath" | Ian Anderson | Aqualung Redux | 2024 | | (Note: "Locomotive Breath" was originally recorded by Jethro Tull.) |
| "Lords" | John D. Cronise; Kyle Shutt; Bryan Richie; Trivett Wingo ‡ | Gods of the Earth | 2008 | | |
| "Maiden, Mother & Crone" | John D. Cronise; Kyle Shutt; Bryan Richie; Trivett Wingo ‡ | Gods of the Earth | 2008 | | |
| "March of the Lor" | John D. Cronise; Kyle Shutt; Bryan Richie; Trivett Wingo ‡ | Gods of the Earth | 2008 | | |
| "Mist & Shadow" | John D. Cronise; Kyle Shutt; Bryan Richie; Santiago Vela ‡ | High Country | 2015 | | |
| "Nasty Dogs and Funky Kings" | Billy Gibbons; Dusty Hill; Frank Beard | Gods of the Earth | 2008 | | (Note: "Nasty Dogs and Funky Kings", originally recorded by ZZ Top, was released as a bonus track on special editions of Gods of the Earth only.) |
| "Night City" | John D. Cronise | Warp Riders | 2010 | | |
| "(The Night the Sky Cried) Tears of Fire" † | John D. Cronise; Kyle Shutt; Bryan Richie; Trivett Wingo ‡ | Warp Riders | 2010 | | |
| "Sea of Spears" | John D. Cronise; Kyle Shutt | The Sword/Witchcraft | 2007 | | |
| "Seriously Mysterious" | John D. Cronise; Kyle Shutt; Bryan Richie; Santiago Vela ‡ | High Country | 2015 | | |
| "Seven Sisters" | John D. Cronise; Kyle Shutt; Bryan Richie; Santiago Vela ‡ | Apocryphon | 2012 | | |
| "Silver Petals" | John D. Cronise; Kyle Shutt; Bryan Richie; Santiago Vela ‡ | High Country | 2015 | | |
| "Suffer No Fools" | John D. Cronise; Kyle Shutt; Bryan Richie; Santiago Vela ‡ | High Country | 2015 | | |
| "The Sundering" | John D. Cronise; Kyle Shutt; Bryan Richie; Trivett Wingo ‡ | Gods of the Earth | 2008 | | |
| "Tears Like Diamonds" | John D. Cronise; Kyle Shutt; Bryan Richie; Santiago Vela ‡ | High Country | 2015 | | |
| "To Take the Black" | John D. Cronise; Kyle Shutt; Bryan Richie; Trivett Wingo ‡ | Gods of the Earth | 2008 | | |
| "Tres Brujas" † | John D. Cronise; Bryan Richie; Trivett Wingo | Warp Riders | 2010 | | |
| "Turned to Dust" | John D. Cronise; Kyle Shutt; Bryan Richie; Santiago Vela ‡ | High Country | 2015 | | |
| "Under the Boughs" | John D. Cronise; Kyle Shutt; Bryan Richie; Trivett Wingo ‡ | Gods of the Earth | 2008 | | |
| "Unicorn Farm" | John D. Cronise; Kyle Shutt; Bryan Richie; Santiago Vela ‡ | High Country | 2015 | | |
| "The Veil of Isis" | John D. Cronise; Kyle Shutt; Bryan Richie; Santiago Vela ‡ | Apocryphon | 2012 | | |
| "The Warp Riders" | John D. Cronise | Warp Riders | 2010 | | |
| "The White Sea" | John D. Cronise; Kyle Shutt; Bryan Richie; Trivett Wingo ‡ | Gods of the Earth | 2008 | | |
| "Winter's Wolves" | John D. Cronise; Kyle Shutt; Bryan Richie; Trivett Wingo ‡ | Age of Winters | 2006 | | |
