= Greetings From... (album) =

Live album by The Sword
- Released: May 5, 2017
- Recorded: September–October 2016
- Genre: Hard rock; stoner rock; heavy metal; doom metal
- Length: 42:03
- Label: Razor & Tie
- Producer: Bryan Richie

The Sword chronology
Low Country (2016)	Greetings From... (2017)	Used Future (2018)

Singles from Greetings From...
- 1. "Maiden, Mother & Crone" Released: May 5, 2017

Greetings From... is the first live album by American heavy metal band The Sword. Recorded at various dates between September and October 2016 during a North American tour supporting Swedish band Opeth, it was released on May 5, 2017 by Razor & Tie. The album was produced and mixed by the band's bassist Bryan Richie, who had previously produced the compilation album Low Country. The recording of "Maiden, Mother & Crone" was released as the only single from the album.

== Background ==
Greetings From... was recorded during The Sword's fall 2016 tour of the United States supporting Swedish band Opeth. The album's release was supported by two tours of the United States – one in May supporting Clutch and Lucero, as well as a number of headline dates, and the second in June with support on all dates from Big Jesus. The album features recordings of nine tracks on the tour, including four tracks from 2015's High Country, two tracks from 2010's Warp Riders, one track each from 2008's Gods of the Earth and 2006's Age of Winters, and "John the Revelator", which the band released as a single in 2016.

== Track listing ==
No.	Title	Writer(s)	Length
1.	"Buzzards"	John D. Cronise; Kyle Shutt; Bryan Richie; Santiago Vela	4:22
2.	"The Chronomancer I: Hubris"	Cronise; Shutt	7:41
3.	"Maiden, Mother & Crone"	Cronise; Shutt; Richie; Trivett Wingo	4:15
4.	"Tears Like Diamonds"	Cronise; Shutt; Richie; Vela	3:47
5.	"Mist & Shadow"	Cronise; Shutt; Richie; Vela	5:16
6.	"Agartha"	Cronise; Shutt; Richie; Vela	1:21
7.	"Tres Brujas"	Cronise; Shutt	4:15
8.	"John the Revelator"	Traditional	3:30
9.	"The Horned Goddess"	Cronise; Shutt; Richie; Wingo	7:36

== Personnel ==
The Sword

- John D. Cronise – vocals, guitar
- Kyle Shutt – guitar
- Bryan Richie – bass, production, mixing
- Santiago "Jimmy" Vela III – drums

Additional personnel

- Brendan Burke – engineering
- Dan Coutant – mastering
- Fiaz Farrelly – photography
- Cosimo Galluzzi – cover artwork

== Chart positions ==
Chart (2017)	Peak position
US Hard Rock Album Sales (Billboard)	10
US Rock Album Sales (Billboard)	43
