= High country =

High country may refer to:

== Film and television ==
- High Country (1980 film), a New Zealand television film
- High Country (1983 film), an Australian film
- High Country (TV series), an Australian mystery drama series

== Music ==
- High Country (album), an album by The Sword
- "High Country" (song), a song by The Sword

== Places ==
- High country (New Zealand), elevated pastoral land of New Zealand, mainly on South Island
- "High Country", a nickname for parts of western North Carolina in the United States, including the towns of Boone, Blowing Rock, and Banner Elk
- "High Country", a nickname for the Colorado Plateau, including the towns of Flagstaff, Sedona, Prescott, and Payson in northern Arizona
- "High Country", the mountainous part of the Australian Alps lying within the state of Victoria

== Other uses ==
- A trim level of the Chevrolet Silverado pickup truck
