= Low Country (album) =

Compilation album by The Sword
- Released: September 23, 2016
- Recorded: June–August 2015
- Studio: The Bend Studio (Austin, Texas); The Berry Studio (Taylor, Texas)
- Genre: Acoustic rock; stoner rock
- Length: 32:16
- Label: Razor & Tie
- Producer: Bryan Richie

The Sword chronology
High Country (2015)	Low Country (2016)	Greetings From... (2017)

Singles from Low Country
- 1. "Seriously Mysterious" Released: August 26, 2016

Low Country is a compilation album by American hard rock band The Sword. Recorded at The Bend in Austin, Texas and The Berry in Taylor, Texas, it was produced by the band's bassist Bryan Richie and released on September 23, 2016 by Razor & Tie. The album features stripped-down acoustic recordings of ten of the 15 songs from the band's 2015 fifth studio album High Country, which were recorded shortly before the album's release, between June and August 2015.

== Background ==
After recording their fifth studio album High Country between March and June 2015, The Sword recorded primarily acoustic versions of ten of the album's 15 tracks at The Bend in Austin, Texas and The Berry in Taylor, Texas. The recordings were produced by the band's bassist Bryan Richie and mixed at Magpie Cage Studios in Baltimore, Maryland by J. Robbins, who also mixed High Country and had previously produced the band's 2012 fourth studio album Apocryphon.

Low Country was first announced on August 11, 2016, described in an official press release as "a stripped-down acoustic presentation of [High Country's] songs". Following its release, the band supported the album with a number of tour dates in late September and throughout October, including a stint supporting Swedish heavy metal band Opeth and ten headline shows.

== Critical reception ==
Professional ratings
Review scores
Source	Rating
AllMusic	3/5 stars
The Austin Chronicle	3/5 stars
Metal Injection	4/10

Critical reception to Low Country was mixed. AllMusic's James Christopher Monger claimed that it "delivers on its promise of "The Sword: Unplugged," emitting its own curious current of intimacy, leaving the listener both transfixed and uneasy". Monger highlighted tracks such as "Empty Temples" and "Mist & Shadow", but criticised "Seriously Mysterious" and "Ghost Eye" for feeling "a bit weightless". Jeremy Ulrey for Metal Injection criticised many songs on the album in a track-by-track review, claiming that the album "mostly reaffirms that only about half of these songs bear any real heft to them at all", although he did praise the renditions of "Mist & Shadow", "Seriously Mysterious" and "Early Snow". Michael Toland of The Austin Chronicle hailed the album for presenting "genuine creative advancement", in particular claiming that the acoustic format suited frontman John D. Cronise's vocals more than the band's regular style.

== Track listing ==
All lyrics are written by John D. Cronise; all music is composed by The Sword.

No.	Title	Length
1.	"Unicorn Farm"	0:52
2.	"Empty Temples"	3:53
3.	"High Country"	3:05
4.	"Mist & Shadow"	5:20
5.	"Seriously Mysterious"	2:21
6.	"Early Snow"	4:46
7.	"The Dreamthieves"	3:52
8.	"Buzzards"	2:41
9.	"Ghost Eye"	2:14
10.	"The Bees of Spring"	2:12

== Personnel ==
- John D. Cronise – vocals, guitar
- Kyle Shutt – guitar
- Bryan Richie – bass, synthesizers, production, engineering
- Santiago "Jimmy" Vela III – drums, percussion
- Jazz Mills – backing vocals (tracks 3, 5 and 7)
- Mark Gonzales – trombone (track 6)
- Gilbert Elorreagab – trumpet (track 6)
- Josh Levy – baritone saxophone (track 6)
- Kino Esparza – backing vocals (track 7)
- J. Robbins – mixing
- Dan Coutant – mastering
- Adrian Quesada – original vocal production
- Stuart Sikes – original vocal engineering
- Richey Beckett – artwork

== Chart positions ==
Chart (2016)	Peak position
US Hard Rock Albums (Billboard)	10
US Top Current Albums (Billboard)	97
US Top Rock Albums (Billboard)	32
US Top Tastemaker Albums (Billboard)	24
