= Come and Gone =

Come and Gone may refer to:

- Joe Turner's Come and Gone, a play by August Wilson
- "Come and Gone", a song by the Sword from the album Used Future
