= Execrator =

Execrator may refer to:

- Someone who casts a curse
- "Execrator", a song by the Sword from the album Apocryphon
