= Greetings From... =

Greetings From... may refer to:

- Greetings From... EP, a 2008t EP by A Rocket to the Moon
- Greetings From... (album), a 2017 album by The Sword
