= Book of Thoth (disambiguation) =

The Book of Thoth is a name given to many ancient Egyptian texts attributed to Thoth, the Egyptian god of writing and knowledge.

Book of Thoth may also refer to:

- Thoth Tarot, a divinatory tarot deck painted by Lady Frieda Harris
  - The Book of Thoth (Crowley), a book by Aleister Crowley
- "Book of Thoth", a song by the Sword from the album Used Future
