= Low Country =

Low country is a large lowland. Specific uses are:

- Predominantly, South Carolina Lowcountry in the United States of America
- Low Countries, a historical region in Europe, although rarely used in this context
  - see also Netherlands (terminology)
- Low Country, and old term for the Scottish Borders plus far Northern England region
- Low Country (album)
