= Warp Riders Tour =

2010–11 concert tour by the Sword

- Promotional tour by The Sword
- Location: United States, Australia, Europe
- Associated album: Warp Riders
- Start date: October 1, 2010
- End date: May 12, 2011
- Legs: 3
- No. of shows: 42
- Supporting acts: Karma to Burn; Mount Carmel

The Sword concert chronology
- United States Tour (2010); Warp Riders Tour (2010–2011); Apocryphon Tour (2012–2013)

The Warp Riders Tour was a worldwide concert tour by American heavy metal band the Sword. The tour began on October 1, 2010 in the United States and ended on May 12, 2011 in London, England to promote the band's third album Warp Riders. Following the United States leg of the tour, the band joined Soundwave, a travelling music festival, in Australia in 2011. They then performed an additional 12 shows in Europe. Prior to the tour, the band supported Metallica on their World Magnetic Tour in September 2010. They also performed at the Austin City Limits Festival, between October 8 and October 10.

Between November and December 2010 a 26-date European leg was due to take place, but was cancelled early in October due to "circumstances beyond [the band's] control", later revealed to be the departure of drummer Trivett Wingo from the band. Drummer Kevin Fender joined the Sword as a touring member of the band in November, and performed with the band on a rescheduled America leg throughout November and December, and on the Australian Soundwave festival leg in 2011.

== Set lists ==
Original tour dates

October 1, 2010
1. "Acheron/Unearthing the Orb"
2. "Tres Brujas"
3. "How Heavy This Axe"
4. "The Chronomancer I: Hubris"
5. "Barael's Blade"
6. "Freya"
7. "Arrows in the Dark"
8. "Lawless Lands"
9. "Maiden, Mother & Crone"
10. "The Chronomancer II: Nemesis"
11. "Night City"
12. "The Black River"
13. "(The Night the Sky Cried) Tears of Fire"
October 2, 2010
1. "Acheron/Unearthing the Orb"
2. "Tres Brujas"
3. "Freya"
4. "How Heavy This Axe"
5. "The Chronomancer I: Hubris"
6. "Barael's Blade"
7. "Lawless Lands"
8. "Astraea's Dream"
9. "Maiden, Mother & Crone"
10. "The Warp Riders"
11. "Night City"
12. "Fire Lances of the Ancient Hyperzephyrians"
13. "Winter's Wolves"
14. "(The Night the Sky Cried) Tears of Fire"

Encore

15. "Cold Sweat" (Thin Lizzy cover)
16. "Iron Swan"
October 3, 2010
1. "Acheron/Unearthing the Orb"
2. "Tres Brujas"
3. "Freya"
4. "How Heavy This Axe"
5. "Arrows in the Dark"
6. "The Chronomancer I: Hubris"
7. "Astraea's Dream"
8. "Night City"
9. "To Take the Black"
10. "The Black River"
11. "Iron Swan"
12. "(The Night the Sky Cried) Tears of Fire"

Encore

13. "The Horned Goddess"
14. "Barael's Blade"
15. "Winter's Wolves"
October 6, 2010
1. "Acheron/Unearthing the Orb"
2. "Tres Brujas"
3. "Freya"
4. "How Heavy This Axe"
5. "Arrows in the Dark"
6. "The Chronomancer I: Hubris"
7. "Astraea's Dream"
8. "The Horned Goddess"
9. "To Take the Black"
10. "The Black River"
11. "Lawless Lands"
12. "The Warp Riders"
13. "(The Night the Sky Cried) Tears of Fire"

Encore

14. "Maiden, Mother & Crone"
15. "Iron Swan"

Rescheduled tour dates

December 4, 2010
1. "Acheron/Unearthing the Orb"
2. "Tres Brujas"
3. "Barael's Blade"
4. "Arrows in the Dark"
5. "How Heavy This Axe"
6. "The Chronomancer I: Hubris"
7. "Fire Lances of the Ancient Hyperzephyrians"
8. "The Horned Goddess"
9. "Iron Swan"
10. "The Warp Riders"
11. "Night City"
12. "The Black River"
13. "Freya"
14. "(The Night the Sky Cried) Tears of Fire"

Encore

15. "Astraea's Dream"
16. "Winter's Wolves"
December 6, 2010
1. "Acheron/Unearthing the Orb"
2. "Tres Brujas"
3. "Barael's Blade"
4. "Arrows in the Dark"
5. "How Heavy This Axe"
6. "The Chronomancer I: Hubris"
7. "Fire Lances of the Ancient Hyperzephyrians"
8. "The Horned Goddess"
9. "Iron Swan"
10. "The Warp Riders"
11. "Night City"
12. "The Chronomancer II: Nemesis"
13. "The Black River"
14. "Freya"
15. "(The Night the Sky Cried) Tears of Fire"

Encore

16. "Acheron/Unearthing the Orb"
17. "Winter's Wolves"
December 7, 2010
1. "Acheron/Unearthing the Orb"
2. "Tres Brujas"
3. "Barael's Blade"
4. "Arrows in the Dark"
5. "How Heavy This Axe"
6. "The Chronomancer I: Hubris"
7. "Fire Lances of the Ancient Hyperzephyrians"
8. "Lawless Lands"
9. "March of the Lor"
10. "Iron Swan"
11. "Maiden, Mother & Crone"
12. "The Warp Riders"
13. "Night City"
14. "Freya"
15. "(The Night the Sky Cried) Tears of Fire"

Encore

16. "Astraea's Dream"
17. "Winter's Wolves"
December 8, 2010
1. "Acheron/Unearthing the Orb"
2. "Tres Brujas"
3. "Barael's Blade"
4. "Arrows in the Dark"
5. "How Heavy This Axe"
6. "The Chronomancer I: Hubris"
7. "Fire Lances of the Ancient Hyperzephyrians"
8. "Lawless Lands"
9. "Maiden, Mother & Crone"
10. "Night City"
11. "The Chronomancer II: Nemesis"
12. "The Horned Goddess"
13. "The Black River"
14. "Freya"
15. "Iron Swan"
16. "(The Night the Sky Cried) Tears of Fire"

Encore

17. "Astraea's Dream"
18. "Winter's Wolves"
December 12, 2010
1. "Acheron/Unearthing the Orb"
2. "Tres Brujas"
3. "Barael's Blade"
4. "Arrows in the Dark"
5. "How Heavy This Axe"
6. "Lawless Lands"
7. "Fire Lances of the Ancient Hyperzephyrians"
8. "The Chronomancer II: Nemesis"
9. "The Horned Goddess"
10. "Iron Swan"
11. "Lords"
12. "Night City"
13. "Freya"
14. "The Black River"
15. "(The Night the Sky Cried) Tears of Fire"

Encore

16. "Winter's Wolves"

== Tour dates ==
Date	City	Country	Venue	Support act(s)
Warm-up shows: World Magnetic Tour: Oceania/Asia
September 15, 2010	Melbourne	Australia	Rod Laver Arena	Supporting Metallica
September 16, 2010	Melbourne	Australia	Rod Laver Arena	Supporting Metallica
September 18, 2010	Sydney	Australia	Acer Arena	Supporting Metallica
September 21, 2010	Christchurch	New Zealand	CBS Canterbury Arena	Supporting Metallica
September 22, 2010	Christchurch	New Zealand	CBS Canterbury Arena	Supporting Metallica
September 25, 2010	Tokyo	Japan	Saitama Super Arena	Supporting Metallica
September 26, 2010	Tokyo	Japan	Saitama Super Arena	Supporting Metallica
First Leg: North America
October 1, 2010	Los Angeles	United States	El Rey Theatre	Karma to Burn; Mount Carmel
October 2, 2010	San Francisco	United States	Regency Ballroom	Karma to Burn; Mount Carmel
October 3, 2010	Portland	United States	Roseland Theater	Karma to Burn; Mount Carmel
October 4, 2010	Seattle	United States	Showbox SoDo	Karma to Burn; Mount Carmel
October 6, 2010	Denver	United States	Ogden Theatre	Karma to Burn; Mount Carmel
November 27, 2010	Baton Rouge	United States	Spanish Moon	Karma to Burn; Mount Carmel
November 28, 2010	Birmingham	United States	WorkPlay Theatre	Karma to Burn; Mount Carmel
November 29, 2010 (Note: Originally scheduled for October 12, 2010)	Atlanta	United States	Masquerade Club	Karma to Burn; Mount Carmel
November 30, 2010 (Note: Originally scheduled for October 13, 2010)	Asheville	United States	The Orange Peel	Karma to Burn; Mount Carmel
December 1, 2010 (Note: Originally scheduled for October 14, 2010)	Roanoke	United States	Martin's Downtown	Karma to Burn; Mount Carmel
December 2, 2010	Lancaster	United States	The Chameleon Club	Karma to Burn; Mount Carmel
December 3, 2010 (Note: Originally scheduled for October 15, 2010)	Philadelphia	United States	Theatre of the Living Arts	Karma to Burn; Mount Carmel
December 4, 2010 (Note: Originally scheduled for October 16, 2010)	New York City	United States	Webster Hall	Karma to Burn; Mount Carmel
December 5, 2010 (Note: Originally scheduled for October 17, 2010)	Boston	United States	Royale Boston	Karma to Burn; Mount Carmel
December 6, 2010 (Note: Originally scheduled for October 20, 2010)	Washington, D.C.	United States	9:30 Club	Karma to Burn; Mount Carmel
December 7, 2010	Pittsburgh	United States	Mr. Small's Funhouse	Karma to Burn; Mount Carmel
December 8, 2010 (Note: Originally scheduled for October 19, 2010)	Cleveland	United States	House of Blues	Karma to Burn; Mount Carmel
December 9, 2010 (Note: Originally scheduled for October 21, 2010)	Huntington	United States	V Club Live	Karma to Burn; Mount Carmel
December 10, 2010	Covington	United States	The Mad Hatter	Karma to Burn; Mount Carmel
December 11, 2010	Detroit	United States	The Shelter	Karma to Burn; Mount Carmel
December 12, 2010 (Note: Originally scheduled for October 23, 2010)	Chicago	United States	Metro Chicago	Karma to Burn; Mount Carmel
December 13, 2010	St. Louis	United States	The Firebird	Karma to Burn; Mount Carmel
December 14, 2010	Iowa City	United States	Blue Moose Tap House	Karma to Burn; Mount Carmel
December 15, 2010	Kansas City	United States	Record Bar	Karma to Burn; Mount Carmel
December 16, 2010	Little Rock	United States	Juanita's	Karma to Burn; Mount Carmel
Second Leg: Australia (Soundwave)
February 26, 2011	Brisbane	Australia	RNA Showgrounds	Various
February 27, 2011	Sydney	Australia	Eastern Creek Raceway	Various
March 4, 2011	Melbourne	Australia	Royal Melbourne Showgrounds	Various
March 5, 2011	Adelaide	Australia	Bonython Park	Various
March 7, 2011	Perth	Australia	Steel Blue Oval	Various
Third Leg: Europe
April 30, 2011	Bergen	Norway	Bergenfest	—N/a
May 1, 2011	Copenhagen	Denmark	Loppen	—N/a
May 2, 2011 (Note: Originally scheduled for November 15, 2010)	Berlin	Germany	Magnet Club	—N/a
May 3, 2011	Cologne	Germany	Underground Club	—N/a
May 4, 2011 (Note: Originally scheduled for November 26, 2010)	Uden	Netherlands	De Pul	—N/a
May 6, 2011	Paris	France	La Fleche D'Or	—N/a
May 7, 2011	Wuustwezel	Belgium	Puntpop Festival	—N/a
May 8, 2011	Southampton	England	Joiners Arms	—N/a
May 9, 2011 (Note: Originally scheduled for December 1, 2010)	Birmingham	England	O2 Academy Birmingham	—N/a
May 10, 2011 (Note: Originally scheduled for December 4, 2010 at G2)	Glasgow	Scotland	Glasgow Cathouse	—N/a
May 11, 2011 (Note: Originally scheduled for December 5, 2010)	Manchester	England	Academy 3	—N/a
May 12, 2011 (Note: Originally scheduled for December 9, 2010 at O2 Academy Islington)	London	England	Garage Club	—N/a

=== Cancelled shows ===
Date	City	Country	Venue	Reason
November 6, 2010	Bielefeld	Germany	Forum	Departure of Trivett Wingo
November 8, 2010	Antwerp	Belgium	Trix Hall	Departure of Trivett Wingo
November 9, 2010	Hamburg	Germany	Molotow Club	Departure of Trivett Wingo
November 11, 2010	Stockholm	Sweden	Gote Killare	Departure of Trivett Wingo
November 12, 2010	Malmö	Sweden	KP Club	Departure of Trivett Wingo
November 13, 2010	Oslo	Norway	Garage Oslo	Departure of Trivett Wingo
November 16, 2010	Munich	Germany	59:1	Departure of Trivett Wingo
November 17, 2010	Vienna	Austria	Szene Wien	Departure of Trivett Wingo
November 18, 2010	Milan	Italy	Live Music Club	Departure of Trivett Wingo
November 19, 2010	Graz	Austria	Project Pop Culture	Departure of Trivett Wingo
November 21, 2010	Zürich	Switzerland	Jugendkulturhaus Dynamo	Departure of Trivett Wingo
November 27, 2010	Kerkrade	Netherlands	Rock Tempel	Departure of Trivett Wingo
November 29, 2010	Portsmouth	England	The Wedgewood Rooms	Departure of Trivett Wingo
November 30, 2010	Bristol	England	Fleece and Firkin	Departure of Trivett Wingo
December 2, 2010	Leeds	England	The Cockpit	Departure of Trivett Wingo
December 5, 2010	Newcastle	England	O2 Academy Newcastle	Departure of Trivett Wingo
December 8, 2010	Nottingham	England	Rescue Rooms	Departure of Trivett Wingo
December 10, 2010	Brighton	England	Audio Brighton	Departure of Trivett Wingo
December 11, 2010	Dublin	Ireland	The Academy	Departure of Trivett Wingo
December 12, 2010	Belfast	Northern Ireland	Stiff Kitten	Departure of Trivett Wingo
