= Hammer of Heaven =

Single by The Sword
- Released: May 1, 2012
- Genre: Heavy metal, stoner rock
- Length: 5:47
- Label: Razor & Tie
- Songwriter(s): J. D. Cronise
- Producer(s): J. D. Cronise

The Sword singles chronology
"(The Night the Sky Cried) Tears of Fire" (2010)	"Hammer of Heaven" (2012)	"The Hidden Masters/Arcane Montane" (2014)

"Hammer of Heaven" is a song by American heavy metal band The Sword. Written and produced by frontman J. D. Cronise, the song was released as a non-album digital single in May 2012, and later on a limited edition 7" picture disc the following month.

== Background ==
"Hammer of Heaven" dates back to 2003, when the track was originally recorded; it was not included on the band's 2006 debut album Age of Winters reportedly due to "severe space limitations" on the release. Years later, the song was submitted for inclusion on the soundtrack to the 2012 film The Avengers, which was released on the same day as the "Hammer of Heaven" digital single without the track included.

Following the release of "Hammer to Heaven" as a digital download single on May 1, 2012, it was announced that, "due to popular demand", a limited edition 7" picture disc version was to be produced for release on June 22. Limited to only 1,000 copies, the vinyl edition of the single was backed with a live version of Age of Winters track "Ebethron" recorded at Stubb's BBQ in Austin, Texas.

== Track listing ==
All tracks are written by J. D. Cronise

Digital download
No.	Title	Length
1.	"Hammer of Heaven"	5:47

7" picture disc
No.	Title	Length
1.	"Hammer of Heaven"	5:47
2.	"Ebethron" (live)	6:36
Total length:		12:23

== Personnel ==
The Sword

- J. D. Cronise – vocals, guitar
- Kyle Shutt – lead guitar
- Bryan Richie – bass, keyboards ("Hammer of Heaven"), engineering, mixing
- Trivett Wingo – drums ("Hammer of Heaven")
- Santiago "Jimmy" Vela III – drums ("Ebethron")

Additional personnel

- Drew Lavyne – mastering
- Joel Hume – engineering ("Ebethron")
