= The Hidden Masters/Arcane Montane =

- "The Hidden Masters" cover

Single by The Sword

from the album Apocryphon
- Released: April 8, 2014
- Recorded: June–July 2012 at Magpie Cage Studios, Baltimore, Maryland
- Genre: Heavy metal, doom metal, stoner metal, hard rock
- Length: 4:49 ("The Hidden Masters"); 4:06 ("Arcane Montane")
- Label: Razor & Tie
- Songwriter: The Sword
- Producers: J. Robbins, The Sword

The Sword singles chronology
"Hammer of Heaven" (2012)	"The Hidden Masters/Arcane Montane" (2014)	"High Country" (2015)

"The Hidden Masters" and "Arcane Montane" are songs by American heavy metal band The Sword. The lyrics for both were written by vocalist and guitarist J. D. Cronise, and the music is credited to the full band. Produced by J. Robbins, the songs are featured on The Sword's 2012 fourth studio album Apocryphon, and were released together as a single on April 8, 2014.

== Composition and style ==
In a favorable review of Apocryphon for website PopMatters, Dean Brown noted that both tracks "lean lyrically on fantasy, but there is some apocalyptic tension in [writer J. D.] Cronise's words", adding that on "Arcane Montane" the singer "begs for assistance from the mountains while they [sic] band shake the ground with some Clutch-style swagger". Consequence of Sound's Jon Hadusek also praised the album for its apocalyptic themes, highlighting "The Hidden Masters" as a track on which Cronise "sets the grim scene" and "Arcane Montane" as featuring "fantastical motifs".

== Release and packaging ==
It was announced in February 2014 that "The Hidden Masters" and "Arcane Montane" would be released as a double single on 7" vinyl, with remixes of each track by Dylan C included as B-sides. "The Hidden Masters" was pressed on green vinyl and "Arcane Montane" was pressed on pink vinyl. The set was released on April 8, 2014.

== Track listing ==
All lyrics are written by J. D. Cronise; all music is composed by The Sword.

Disc one ("The Hidden Masters")
No.	Title	Length
1.	"The Hidden Masters"	4:49
2.	"The Hidden Masters" (Dylan C remix)	5:11
Total length:		10:00

Disc two ("Arcane Montane")
No.	Title	Length
1.	"Arcane Montane"	4:09
2.	"Arcane Montane" (Dylan C remix)	4:55
Total length:		9:04

== Personnel ==
The Sword

- J. D. Cronise – vocals, guitar, production
- Kyle Shutt – guitar, production
- Bryan Richie – bass, synthesizers, production
- Santiago "Jimmy" Vela III – drums, percussion, production

Additional personnel

- J. Robbins – production, engineering, mixing
- Greg Calbi – mastering
- J. H. Williams III – design, illustrations
- Todd Klein – design assistance
