= The Sword/Witchcraft =

EP by The Sword and Witchcraft
- Released: November 13, 2007
- Genre: Heavy metal, doom metal, occult rock, hard rock
- Length: 21:46
- Label: Kemado
- Producer: J. D. Cronise, Tom Hakava

The Sword chronology
Age of Winters (2006)	The Sword/Witchcraft (2007)	Gods of the Earth (2008)

Witchcraft chronology
The Alchemist (2007)	The Sword/Witchcraft (2007)	Legend (2012)

The Sword/Witchcraft is a split extended play (EP) by American heavy metal band The Sword and Swedish occult rock band Witchcraft. Released on November 13, 2007 by Kemado Records, the label with which The Sword were signed at the time, it was limited to 2,500 vinyl copies.

== Track listing ==
Side A (The Sword)
No.	Title	Writer(s)	Length
1.	"Sea of Spears"	J. D. Cronise, Kyle Shutt	4:47
2.	"Immigrant Song" (Led Zeppelin cover)	Jimmy Page, Robert Plant	2:13
Total length:			7:00

Side B (Witchcraft)
No.	Title	Writer(s)	Length
3.	"You Bury Your Head"	Magnus Pelander	4:27
4.	"Queen of Bees"	Pelander, John Hoyles, Ola Henriksson	4:44
5.	"Sorrow Evoker"	Pelander, Hoyles, Henriksson	5:35
Total length:			14:46

== Personnel ==
The Sword tracks

- J. D. Cronise – vocals, guitar, production
- Kyle Shutt – guitar
- Bryan Richie – bass, engineering, mixing
- Trivett Wingo – drums

Witchcraft tracks

- Magnus Pelander – vocals, guitar
- John Hoyles – guitar, acoustic guitar
- Ola Henriksson – bass
- Fredrik Jansson – drums (tracks 4 and 5)
- Jen Henriksson – drums (track 3)
- Tom Hakava – recording, piano (track 5)

Additional personnel

- Vance Kelly – artwork
