= Cold Sweat / Maiden, Mother & Crone =

"Cold Sweat/Maiden, Mother & Crone"

Single by The Sword and Year Long Disaster
- Released: March 15, 2010
- Genre: Heavy metal, stoner rock
- Length: 6:51
- Label: Volcom
- Songwriter(s): "Cold Sweat"; Phil Lynott, John Sykes "Maiden, Mother & Crone"; J. D. Cronise, Kyle Shutt, Bryan Richie, Trivett Wingo
- Producer(s): "Cold Sweat"; J. D. Cronise "Maiden, Mother & Crone"; Scott Reeder

The Sword singles chronology
"Fire Lances of the Ancient Hyperzephyrians" (2008)	"Cold Sweat/Maiden, Mother & Crone" (2010)	"Tres Brujas" (2010)

Year Long Disaster singles chronology
"Black Magic" (2010)	"Maiden, Mother & Crone" (2010)

"Cold Sweat"/"Maiden, Mother & Crone" is a split single by American bands The Sword and Year Long Disaster. Released as part of the Volcom Entertainment Vinyl Club on March 15, 2010, the single features a cover version of Thin Lizzy's "Cold Sweat" by The Sword and a cover version of The Sword's "Maiden, Mother & Crone" by Year Long Disaster. The single was printed on "opaque baby blue" 7" vinyl and was limited to 1,000 copies.

== Track listing ==
Side A
No.	Title	Writer(s)	Length
1.	"Cold Sweat" (Thin Lizzy cover performed by The Sword)	Phil Lynott, John Sykes	2:57

Side B
No.	Title	Writer(s)	Length
1.	"Maiden, Mother & Crone" (The Sword cover performed by Year Long Disaster)	J. D. Cronise, Kyle Shutt, Bryan Richie, Trivett Wingo	3:54
Total length:			6:51

== Personnel ==
"Cold Sweat"

- J. D. Cronise – vocals, guitar, production
- Kyle Shutt – guitar
- Bryan Richie – bass, engineering
- Trivett Wingo – drums, backing vocals

"Maiden, Mother & Crone"

- Daniel Davies – vocals, guitar
- Rich Mullins – bass
- Rob Oswald – drums
- John Konesky – additional guitar
- Scott Reeder – production

Additional personnel

- Alexander Von Wieding – artwork
