= Freya (song) =

2007 song performed by The Sword

Single by The Sword

from the album Age of Winters
- Released: September 4, 2007
- Genre: Heavy metal, stoner rock
- Length: 4:34
- Label: Kemado
- Songwriter(s): John D. Cronise; Kyle Shutt; Bryan Richie; Trivett Wingo
- Producer(s): John D. Cronise

The Sword singles chronology
"Freya" (2007)	"Fire Lances of the Ancient Hyperzepyrians" (2008)

"Freya" is a song by American heavy metal band The Sword. Written by the band and produced by vocalist and guitarist John D. Cronise, it is featured on the band's 2006 debut studio album Age of Winters. In addition to being released as the only single from the album on September 4, 2007, "Freya" was featured as a playable track on the video game Guitar Hero II, released in November 2006.

Due in part to its inclusion on Guitar Hero II, as well as its release as the lead single from Age of Winters, "Freya" is often cited as The Sword's signature song. It has been performed at almost every one of the band's shows, and was praised by critics upon its release. The song was later included on the 2009 Guitar Hero expansion Smash Hits, and also on the band's iTunes Festival: London 2010 EP.

== Origins and recording ==
"Freya" was originally recorded for The Sword's third demo, released in 2005 and often referred to as "The Freya EP". The song's lyrics are said to be based on the themes of fantasy and legend, as well as those within Norse mythology. The song is likely about the Norse goddess Freyja, whose "dwelling", Fólkvangr, is also referenced by the name of the band's studio at which the track was recorded, Folkvang.

The Sword guitarist Kyle Shutt has revealed that the band took inspiration from Led Zeppelin for much of the material on Age of Winters, including "Freya". Speaking about the popularity of the song in a 2012 interview, he claimed that the band had performed it at "every single show" to date, explaining that they would "mix it up every once in a while [and] throw in some different parts" when playing it live. According to set list aggregation website setlist.fm, "Freya" is the most frequently performed song by The Sword.

== Release and reception ==
Following its release on The Sword's debut album Age of Winters in February 2006, a cover version of "Freya" was featured as a playable track in stage 5, "Return of the Shred", of the video game Guitar Hero II, released in November 2006. The version of the song included on the game was recorded by WaveGroup Sound and features an extra part at the end which was not present on The Sword's recording. The master recording was later included on the 2009 expansion Guitar Hero Smash Hits, as one of 19 tracks from Guitar Hero II. Speaking about the band's inclusion on the Guitar Hero games (including later releases Guitar Hero: Metallica and Guitar Hero 5), Kemado Records marketing director and label manager Jeffrey Kaye simply revealed that the team at Activision were fans of heavy metal and The Sword in particular, adding that "There was very little pitching necessary for them".

"Freya" was later issued as the sole single from Age of Winters on September 4, 2007. Released to coincide with the band's UK tour with Clutch, the 7" vinyl single was limited to 1,000 copies and backed with a live version of fellow album track "Iron Swan" recorded at the CBGB venue in New York City shortly before its closing. The song was later featured as the opening track on the band's iTunes Festival: London 2010 extended play, recorded on July 3, 2010 and released later that month.

Reviewing Age of Winters for AllMusic, Eduardo Rivadavia selected "Freya" as the main highlight of the album. On the contrary, PopMatters writer Adrien Begrand claimed that "Freya" and following track "Winter's Wolves" "come close to sounding pedestrian", criticising the songs' "charmingly lunkheaded riffs" and Cronise's vocal delivery. Virgin Media featured "Freya" in their feature "Guitar Hero: the unlikely fan favourites", detailing the "top 10 unfashionable tracks which have become classics for a new generation".

== Music video ==
The music video for "Freya", the second from Age of Winters after "Winter's Wolves", was directed by Barnaby Roper and filmed in Hollywood, Los Angeles, California. It tells the story of a protagonist of the song's name who "appears on a battlefield after a battle and wanders through the corpses looking for warriors to take back to Folkvang".

== Track listing ==
All lyrics are written by John D. Cronise; all music is composed by The Sword

No.	Title	Length
1.	"Freya"	4:34
2.	"Iron Swan" (live at the CBGB)	5:48
Total length:		9:22

== Personnel ==
- John D. Cronise – vocals, guitars, production, mixing
- Kyle Shutt – guitars, mixing
- Bryan Richie – bass, engineering, mixing
- Trivett Wingo – drums, mixing
- Mike Groener – additional vocal engineering
- Rick Essig – mastering
- Vance Kelly – artwork
