= Warp Riders =

Studio album by the Sword
- Released: August 19, 2010 (release history)
- Recorded: February–April 2010
- Studios: Wire Recording, Austin, Texas
- Genres: Hard rock, progressive rock, heavy metal
- Length: 48:16
- Label: Kemado
- Producer: Matt Bayles

The Sword chronology
Gods of the Earth (2008)	Warp Riders (2010)	Apocryphon (2012)

Singles from Warp Riders
- 1. "Tres Brujas" Released: July 6, 2010; 2. "(The Night the Sky Cried) Tears of Fire" Released: November 4, 2010

Warp Riders is the third studio album by American heavy metal band the Sword. Recorded at Wire Recording in Austin, Texas with producer Matt Bayles, it was released by Kemado Records in August 2010. Warp Riders was written and recorded as a concept album centered on an original science fiction narrative written by vocalist and guitarist J. D. Cronise, and marks a conscious change in style from doom metal to a more hard rock-influenced sound.

The Sword's third album is the first by the band to be produced by someone other than frontman Cronise, who handled production duties on Age of Winters and Gods of the Earth. It was also the last album to feature original drummer Trivett Wingo, who left the band in October 2010 early into the promotional tour for the record, citing physical and mental exhaustion. The album was also the group's last to be released under their deal with Kemado Records, before signing with Razor & Tie in 2012.

The lead single from Warp Riders was "Tres Brujas", which was released as a digital download in July 2010. The song is also featured as the first in a trilogy of music videos to promote the album, which also includes "Lawless Lands" and "Night City". The second single from the album is "(The Night the Sky Cried) Tears of Fire", released in November 2010. Warp Riders was a relative commercial success, peaking at number 42 on the US Billboard 200 chart, and the album was promoted on the Warp Riders Tour starting in November 2010.

== Writing and recording ==
It first came to light that the Sword was working on a follow-up to Gods of the Earth in August 2009, when the band revealed that "The writing process is nearing completion, and demoing will soon commence. Recording will follow in the fall with a release as soon as the suits can get it together. The record will be a concept album centered around an original science fiction narrative". The first performance of new material came at Fun Fun Fun Fest in November, with drummer Trivett Wingo comparing this practice to the first performance of tracks from Gods of the Earth at the 2007 edition of the festival. An update regarding the album was issued in December, explaining that the band had nearly completed the writing process for the record, would begin recording in early 2010, and were to embark on a short regional tour in January.

In February 2010 it was revealed that, contrary to the practice exercised on the band's previous two albums, frontman J. D. Cronise would not be producing the upcoming third album; instead production and engineering would be led by Matt Bayles, known for his work with such bands as Mastodon, Isis and Minus the Bear. It was also revealed at this time that recording for the album had begun, at a recording studio in Austin, Texas known as The Wire. By April the Sword had completed the recording of its third album, although no further details were given regarding a track listing, title or release date. Cronise assured fans in April, in response to the query "Give us a status report on what's been recorded so far and what it sounds like" from an interviewer, that the album was "completely done" and contained "things ... that our fans will be very glad to hear, and ... things they don't know they'll be glad to hear until they hear them".

== Composition and style ==
In the band's first update regarding the third album, it was revealed that the album was to be "a concept album centered around an original science fiction narrative." In March 2010, primary songwriter Cronise added further detail to this idea by suggesting that the album would have a "broader hard rock sound", explaining that "It's really a concept record. The songs revolve around a concept we came up with or spin off from it. It's not the kind of fantasy concept though, it's more sci-fi." Cronise also offered the following explanation of the album's direction in an interview with Decibel:

"This is what you'd technically call a 'concept album,' though I'd describe it as more of a soundtrack to a story I came up with. All the songs are about aspects of the story, but they don't cover every detail from beginning to end. It's a science fiction story, and it deals heavily with themes of light and dark and perceptions of time. One of the main settings is a planet, which has experienced tidal locking, creating a side of perpetual day and a side of perpetual night. The reason for creating a narrative to base the songs around was essentially to provide interesting and varied lyrical subject matter with a core theme to tie it all together."

It was revealed as early as November 2009 that the band were aiming to take a new direction with the third album, with Cronise explaining that "coming up with eight or nine or 10 different themes [for songs] every couple years, well, it's a little daunting some times, especially for me personally" and noting that "Given the types of themes we'd covered already, I didn't really want to revisit the same stuff again on another record and talk about the same things and doom and gloom and sorcerers and ravens and things. So, we just kind of wanted to change it up and do something a little different." Further elaboration was also given on the 'science fiction concept album' idea, with Cronise explaining that "It's psychedelic, in a way. It's not like Star Wars science fiction ... laser guns and action all the time. It's more cerebral in that it's still mythological in the way it's told. It's science fiction and there's spaceships and robots, but it doesn't take place in the future. It's just like another planet far away sort of thing. Otherworldly. And of course, it will have universal-type themes in it. I wanted to create a completely original kind of setting to have the songs take place in."

Predicting critical reception to the new direction of the album, Cronise proposed that "It will absolutely alienate some fans. The kind of music we play is partially described as heavy metal and unfortunately, a lot of dudes that like heavy metal are very narrow-minded and only like it to sound one particular way. So I'm sure we alienated people with our second album." Despite this, he assured that the sound of the music would not change as much, explaining that "There'll definitely still be heavy stuff on the record, and fast, thrashy, and slow and sludgy stuff like we've done before. Heavy metal, basically. But a lot of the songs are just what I'd call hard rock songs. The attitude and the vibe is different. It's not as aggressive, sonically. It's a little bit more ... I don't know how to explain it. It's just rock. It's a rock album. Some parts will be heavier than the heaviest stuff we've done, but at the same time, there will be acoustic stuff. It is a varied record, I guess.

Music news website MetalInsider.net mentioned the album on its Twitter profile, saying "Listening to some new Sword album. Mind blown. Sounds like Lynyrd Skynyrd crashed into C.O.C. instead of a mountain." According to the press release, the album "is anchored by an epic science-fiction narrative" and "the storyline is a psychedelic space opera that explores temporal themes of death and rebirth."

=== Science fiction storyline ===
The band's official website gives an in-depth description of the album's science fiction storyline:

Warp Riders is the Sword's first concept album, a science fiction maelstrom put to the storming, relentless riffage and pounding rhythms upon which the band has staked its reputation. It's also their most flat-out, supercharged, adrenaline-pumping work yet, a chrome-plated war machine that lords over the blackened sky. From the street-prowling anthems "Night City" and "Lawless Lands" to the two-part showdown of "The Chronomancer," to the furious mechanics of closing track "(The Night the Sky Cried) Tears of Fire," the Sword forces eminent domain ruling over heavy metal for the next decade, and welcome all challengers for an ill-fated shot at the title.

Warp Riders tells the tale of Ereth, an archer banished from his tribe on the planet Acheron. A hardscrabble planet that has undergone a tidal lock, which has caused one side to be scorched by three suns, and the other enshrouded in perpetual darkness, it is the background for a tale of strife and fantasy, the battle between pure good and pure evil. How it's told – through the dueling lead guitars of J.D. Cronise and Kyle Shutt, and the concussive rhythm section of bassist Bryan Ritchie and drummer Trivett Wingo – underscores the narrative with molten steel and unreal precision.

Guitarist and lead vocalist J.D. Cronise explains the lineage of Warp Riders: "I'm pretty sure the first concept album I ever heard was Operation: Mindcrime by Queensrÿche when I was a kid, which I was way into. Even though I never really understood the whole story, I was nonetheless enthralled by how the album created its own world. I wanted to create a setting for our songs that would be unique and different, but still a place where epic sagas unfold in proper Sword fashion." Inspiration took hold from "lots of things ... the legend of Atlantis, old Heavy Metal magazines, the films of René Laloux, a childhood dream, and The Teachings of Don Juan by Carlos Castaneda to name a few."

The story of Warp Riders, entitled "The Night the Sky Cried Tears of Fire" (written by Cronise), follows Ereth as he discovers a mysterious orb and meets the Chronomancer, a being beyond time and space who enlists him in a quest to restore the planet's balance. Along the way he encounters strange warriors, mysterious witches, ancient androids, and a crew of space pirates with a vessel that will alter the course of history... a vessel known as, the Sword.

Music website musicOMH also briefly detailed the synopsis of the album's story, explaining that "we follow the tale of an archer by the name of Ereth, who has been cast out from his tribe on the planet Acheron. As luck would have it the planet has undergone a tidal lock, causing one half to be cast in shadow, whilst the other is burnt to a crisp by a set of unforgiving suns. With light and shade being quite a feature of the planet, it was only a matter of time before a battle between good and evil broke out – cursed metaphors. Warp Riders follows this tale to the bitter end."

== Album cover ==
The album cover was revealed in late June; designed by artist Dan McPharlin, it is said to pay homage to the authors that inspired the album's lyrics.

== Release ==
It was on April 30, 2010 that the album's title and release date were confirmed as Warp Riders and August 24. On May 14, 2010 the first song titles for Warp Riders – "Acheron/Unearthing the Orb" and "(The Night Sky Cried) Tears of Fire" – were confirmed. Blabbermouth.net reported the following descriptions:

Opening track "Acheron/Unearthing the Orb" begins with ominous, fog-drenched atmosphere before a flurry of nimble fretwork and galloping drums storm out of the gate. The energy doesn't let up once and by the final moments of closing cut, "(The Night Sky Cried) Tears of Fire", an intensely satisfying resolution sets in. Guitarists Kyle Shutt and John "J. D." Cronise execute punishing acrobatics while injecting melody at every turn. Bryan Richie's warm bass lays down the foundation and ripples with menace. Trivett Wingo's drumming explodes with the perfect balance of both precision and dexterity.

The lead single from the album was "Tres Brujas", which was released as a digital download on July 6, 2010. The song is also the first in a planned trilogy of music videos to be produced by Artificial Army (who worked on the video for "Maiden, Mother & Crone"), which will begin in August and continue with "Lawless Lands" and "Night City", while "(The Night the Sky Cried) Tears of Fire" will also be released as a 12" picture disc. In revealing details of the album's artwork, Blabbermouth.net also named more new songs to be released as singles and/or music videos: lead single "Tres Brujas" and music videos "Lawless Lands" and "Night City". On July 18, 2010, the Sword reported on their official Facebook page that "We are almost done shooting our radical video trilogy for Night City, Tres Brujas and Lawless Lands. First installment should be out first week of August", and uploaded a screenshot from one of the videoshoots.

Beginning on August 20, the Sword have been streaming Warp Riders in full on their MySpace page for free. The music video for "Tres Brujas" began streaming, also on MySpace, from August 23. In reply to a query from a fan on Twitter, the band revealed that they are planning on releasing a comic book based on the Warp Riders album.

== Reception ==
Professional ratings
Review scores
Source	Rating
AllMusic	3.5/5 stars
The A.V. Club	A
BBC	(favourable)
Buzzgrinder	(8.8/10)
musicOMH	3.5/5 stars
Rock Sound	8/10 stars
SPIN	7/10 stars
Metal Hammer (de)	(6/7)

Warp Riders has received generally favourable reviews from music critics. The A.V. Club awarded the album an A grade in its review, with critic Leonard Pierce summarised the album by noting that "the music is gripping, intense, and unimpeachably heavy from the psyched-out mania of “Acheron” to the end." Pierce also suggested that "There isn’t a bad song on the record, and it delivers solid stand-outs ... while remaining a surprisingly unified whole." Eduardo Rivadavia of allmusic awarded the album three and a half stars out of a possible five, the same as Gods of the Earth but one less than Age of Winters, and praised the band's choice to change direction both musically and thematically, highlighting "Tres Brujas", "Lawless Lands" and "The Warp Riders" as particularly notable tracks. Reviewing the album for the BBC, critic Noel Gardner suggested that Warp Riders "is not likely to blow the mind of anyone well versed in this strain of chest-puffing metal, either in terms of originality or any member’s technical ability", although did recognise that "The Sword have stepped up a gear with this release, and ought to crumble the defences of more than a few cynics." Writing for website musicOMH, Sam Shepherd praised the album, summarising it as "vital and thrilling". In Rock Sound Mike Kemp concluded that "the riffs remain as ample and hard-hitting as ever, and with Matt Bayles (Isis, Mastodon) handling the production, the Sword have never sounded better." The album also reached number 42 on the Billboard 200 chart, a personal record for the band.

== Track listing ==
All lyrics are written by J. D. Cronise; all music is composed by Cronise and Kyle Shutt.

Part I: The Archer & the Orb
No.	Title	Length
1.	"Acheron/Unearthing the Orb"	3:43
2.	"Tres Brujas"	4:09
3.	"Arrows in the Dark"	4:30
4.	"The Chronomancer I: Hubris"	7:35
5.	"Lawless Lands"	5:09

Part II: The Android & the Sword
No.	Title	Length
6.	"Astraea's Dream"	3:23
7.	"The Warp Riders"	3:57
8.	"Night City"	3:50
9.	"The Chronomancer II: Nemesis"	5:49
10.	"(The Night the Sky Cried) Tears of Fire"	6:11
Total length:		48:16

Japanese edition
No.	Title	Length
11.	"Daughter of Dawn"	5:05
Total length:		53:21

iTunes edition
No.	Title	Length
11.	"Tres Brujas" (live at the iTunes Festival)	3:58
12.	"(The Night the Sky Cried) Tears of Fire" (live at the iTunes Festival)	5:17
Total length:		57:31

== Personnel ==
The Sword

- J. D. Cronise – vocals, guitars
- Kyle Shutt – guitars
- Bryan Richie – bass
- Trivett Wingo – drums, percussion

Additional personnel

- Matt Bayles – production, engineering, mixing, organ, synthesizers
- Joey Benjamin – engineering assistance
- Chris Common – engineering assistance
- George Marino – mastering
- Dan McPharlin – artwork, graphic design

== Release history ==
Region	Date	Label	Format	Catalog	Ref.
Benelux	August 19, 2010	Kemado Records	CD album	KEM 114	
Benelux	August 19, 2010	Kemado Records	LP album	KEM 115	
Australia	August 20, 2010	Rough Trade Records	CD album	KEM 114	
Australia	August 20, 2010	Rough Trade Records	LP album	KEM 115	
United Kingdom	August 23, 2010	Kemado Records	CD album	KEM 114	
United Kingdom	August 23, 2010	Kemado Records	LP album	KEM 115	
United Kingdom	August 23, 2010	Kemado Records	Digital download	—	
France	August 23, 2010	Kemado Records	CD album	KEM 114	
Germany	August 23, 2010	Kemado Records	Digital download	—	
United States	August 24, 2010	Kemado Records	CD album	KEM 114	
United States	August 24, 2010	Kemado Records	LP album	KEM 115	
Canada	August 24, 2010	Kemado Records	CD album	KEM 114	
Germany	August 27, 2010	Kemado Records	CD album	KEM 114	
Germany	August 27, 2010	Kemado Records	LP album	KEM 115	
Japan	September 15, 2010	P-Vine Records	CD album	PECF3010	
