= Apocryphon (album) =

2012 album by the Sword

Studio album by The Sword
- Released: October 23, 2012 (release history)
- Recorded: June–July 2012 at Magpie Cage Studios, Baltimore, Maryland
- Genre: Heavy metal, doom metal, stoner metal, hard rock
- Length: 44:10
- Label: Razor & Tie
- Producer: J. Robbins, The Sword

The Sword chronology
Warp Riders (2010)	Apocryphon (2012)	High Country (2015)

Singles from Apocryphon
- 1. "The Hidden Masters/Arcane Montane" Released: April 8, 2014

Apocryphon is the fourth studio album by American heavy metal band The Sword. Recorded at Magpie Cage Studios in Baltimore, Maryland with producer J. Robbins, it was released by New York label Razor & Tie in October 2012. Apocryphon is the band's first album without original member Trivett Wingo, and the first to feature his replacement Santiago "Jimmy" Vela III, who took over from interim touring drummer Kevin Fender in October 2011; it is also the first of the band's albums to be released by Razor & Tie, with whom the group signed in early 2012 after seven years with Kemado Records.

== Background ==
Following the release of critically successful third album Warp Riders in August 2010, The Sword embarked on the worldwide Warp Riders Tour in October. Early into the first leg, original drummer Trivett Wingo left the band, claiming to be "physically and emotionally unable to continue", and was replaced for the entirety of the rescheduled tour by local musician Kevin Fender. As he was only a temporary touring member of the band, Fender was later replaced permanently with drummer Santiago "Jimmy" Vela III, who was brought in at the end of 2011 for a run of tour dates.

In March 2012, it was announced that The Sword had left Kemado Records and signed a worldwide deal with New York-based independent label Razor & Tie. The news also came with the first mention of a follow-up to Warp Riders, which it was predicted would be recorded starting in June, with a planned release before the end of the year. At their few shows in June, the group performed new songs from the upcoming album for the first time, including "Veil" (later renamed "The Veil of Isis"), "Execrator", and title track "Apocryphon".

== Recording and production ==
Recording for Apocryphon commenced in June 2012 at Magpie Cage Studios, owned by producer and engineer J. Robbins. The recording process – which was completed mostly with analog equipment – spanned approximately five weeks, with the album completed and ready to be mixed by the end of July. Speaking about the decision to work with Robbins, guitarist Kyle Shutt has explained that the group were attracted to the producer's work with stoner rock band Clutch on their albums Robot Hive/Exodus and Strange Cousins from the West, describing the choice as a "no-brainer" to produce an album with an "energetic sound".

== Composition ==
=== Music ===
Guitarist Kyle Shutt has described the album as "real big sounding, real live and huge sounding", contrasting it with the "technically perfect" Warp Riders, and has also noted that "A lot of the songs are more mid-tempo, but still impossibly heavy". Apocryphon is the first album by The Sword to feature no instrumental tracks.

Writing a review of the album for website AllMusic, critic Eduardo Rivadavia has praised the musical styles of Apocryphon, praising the group for their tendencies to "consistently repeat their choruses for maximum cranial penetration, keep guitar solos melodic, sizzling but to the point, and prioritize leaner working frames". Speaking about the songs "Cloak of Feathers", "The Hidden Masters" and "Hawks & Serpents" in particular, he has noted that the album contains "a smattering of classic rock elements", comparing the sound to the bands Thin Lizzy and Black Sabbath. In a review for Loudwire, Chad Bowar had similar points to make, praising the band's "songwriting prowess" and claiming that "the songs are more direct while still leaving room for some experimentation and jamming". Francois Marchand of The Vancouver Sun compared the music to that of Black Sabbath, Sleep and Lynyrd Skynyrd, praising the electronic elements on the album as well as the straightforward nature of its compositions.

=== Lyrics ===
After exploring the concept album model with their previous release Warp Riders, on Apocryphon the lyrical content is "more of a metaphorical reflection of everything we've gone through" according to Kyle Shutt, who has explained that the album "doesn't really have a story, per se ... though there are some similar lyrical themes that weave in and out of the songs". Frontman J. D. Cronise has also added that "There's not as much storytelling [on Apocryphon] as on previous albums. There are songs about real life subjects". Elaborating on his approach to writing lyrics for the record, he explained that "In a way, I realized music as a vehicle for expressing my own views and thoughts. I shied away from that before in favour of entertaining people with colourful narratives".

Speaking about opening track "The Veil of Isis", Cronise has described the lyrical content as "a little more metaphysical than a lot of our previous stuff", explaining that it "talks a lot about cycles of nature and life and death and birth and transformation and death and rebirth". Elaborating on this, he explained further that "the song is about ... moving on from one phase of the natural cycle to the next and the recognition of the knowledge revealed when such transitions occur", revealing that the title is a reference to Isis, an Egyptian goddess, and that "the 'veil' is that which hides from us the true nature of the universe that, during our earthly existence, is largely hidden from us".

== Packaging and title ==
The first details of the album were revealed on June 5, 2012, amongst which was the title Apocryphon. Speaking about the title of the album, Kyle Shutt has explained the meaning of the word as being about "secret writings or secret teachings about things that maybe shouldn't be known", revealing that it was chosen (by frontman J. D. Cronise) as a metaphor to "mask what [the band are] really going through". Cronise himself has explained that "The word apocryphon came up while I was researching Gnosticism, early Christianity, theosophy, and other esoteric subjects", describing the term as referring to "books that were either banned or removed from the biblical canon".

The artwork for the album, which was produced by comic book artist J. H. Williams III, was officially unveiled on September 10, 2012.

== Release ==
Apocryphon was initially slated for release in "late September or early October" by the band, said to be dependent on when artist J. H. Williams III completed the album cover. The official release date of October 22 was revealed in late August, with the regional release dates revealed a week later. The album was released in a number of formats and merchandise bundles, including a CD with T-shirt and poster, an LP with digital download, and a bundle including CD, LP, cassette, digital download, T-shirt, and autographed poster. The Sword will tour in promotion of Apocryphon for "at least two years", starting with a North American tour from October to December 2012.

The first song to be unveiled from Apocryphon was opening track "The Veil of Isis", which was made available for streaming online on September 25, 2012; this was followed by title track "Apocryphon", for which an official lyric video produced by P. R. Brown was released on October 1. The band began a new marketing campaign in October, whereby fans could unlock streams of tracks from the album by arranging symbols featured on the album cover in the correct order. An official music video for "The Veil of Isis" was later released in November 2012.

== Reception ==
Professional ratings
Aggregate scores
Source	Rating
Metacritic	72/100
Review scores
Source	Rating
AllMusic	4/5 stars
Alternative Press	2.5/5 stars
Consequence of Sound	3.5/5 stars
Loudwire	4/5 stars
PopMatters	8/10 stars
The Vancouver Sun	3/5 stars
Ultimate Guitar Archive	8.3/10

Upon its release, the critical reception for Apocryphon was mainly positive. Writing a four-star review for the website AllMusic, Eduardo Rivadavia praised many elements of the album, including the musical compositions and the lyrical themes, concluding his review by explaining that "Apocryphon basically sees The Sword inching its well-established aesthetic along, slowly but surely; cautiously dabbling in new sounds rather than drastically altering their direction ... operating less timidly and with more satisfying results than anything released since that classic first album [Age of Winters]". Loudwire reviewer Chad Bowar was similarly positive, dubbing it the band's best album to date, while Francois Marchand of The Vancouver Sun compared the album positively to predecessor Warp Riders, describing it as "tailor-made for headbanging and slamming back cans of cheap beer ... a lot of fun".

In its first week Apocryphon sold nearly 17,000 copies in the United States, debuting at number 17 on the US Billboard 200 albums chart (the highest position achieved by the band). The album has sold 62,000 copies in the US as of July 2015.

== Track listing ==
All lyrics are written by J. D. Cronise; all music is composed by The Sword.

No.	Title	Length
1.	"The Veil of Isis"	5:32
2.	"Cloak of Feathers"	5:25
3.	"Arcane Montane"	4:06
4.	"The Hidden Masters"	4:49
5.	"Dying Earth"	5:22
6.	"Execrator"	2:46
7.	"Seven Sisters"	3:30
8.	"Hawks & Serpents"	4:31
9.	"Eyes of the Stormwitch"	3:10
10.	"Apocryphon"	4:59
Total length:		44:10

Deluxe edition bonus tracks
No.	Title	Writer(s)	Length
11.	"Arrows in the Dark" (live at Emo's)	Cronise, Kyle Shutt	4:53
12.	"Barael's Blade" (live at Stubbs's)	Cronise, Shutt, Bryan Richie, Trivett Wingo	3:00
13.	"The Chronomancer II: Nemesis" (live at Stubb's)	Cronise, Shutt	6:05
14.	"Ebethron" (live at Stubb's)	Cronise, Shutt, Richie, Wingo	6:36
15.	"Cheap Sunglasses" (ZZ Top cover)	Billy Gibbons, Dusty Hill, Frank Beard	4:18
Total length:			68:58

== Personnel ==
The Sword

- J. D. Cronise – vocals, guitar, production
- Kyle Shutt – guitar, production
- Bryan Richie – bass, synthesizers, production
- Santiago "Jimmy" Vela III – drums, percussion, production

Additional personnel

- J. Robbins – production, engineering, mixing
- Greg Calbi – mastering
- J. H. Williams III – design, illustrations
- Todd Klein – design assistance

== Chart performance ==
Chart (2012)	Peak position
US Billboard 200	17
US Billboard Hard Rock Albums	2
US Billboard Independent Albums	3
US Billboard Rock Albums	4
US Billboard Tastemaker Albums	5

== Release history ==
Region	Date	Label	Format	Catalog	Ref.
North America	October 23, 2012	Razor & Tie	CD (standard)	7930183356-2	
North America	October 23, 2012	Razor & Tie	CD (deluxe)	7930183376-2	
North America	October 23, 2012	Razor & Tie	LP	7930183356-1	
North America	October 23, 2012	Razor & Tie	CS	none	
North America	October 23, 2012	Razor & Tie	DL	none	
Australia	October 26, 2012	Cortex Records	CD	CTX687CD	
Europe	November 2, 2012	Napalm Records	DL	none	
Europe	November 5, 2012	Napalm Records	CD (deluxe)	NPR462LTD	
Europe	November 5, 2012	Napalm Records	LP	NPR462LP	
