= Used Future =

Studio album by The Sword
- Released: March 23, 2018
- Recorded: October–November 2017
- Studio: Flora Recording & Playback (Portland, Oregon)
- Genre: Hard rock; stoner rock
- Length: 43:36
- Label: Razor & Tie
- Producer: Tucker Martine

The Sword chronology
Greetings From... (2017)	Used Future (2018)

Singles from Used Future
- 1. "Deadly Nightshade" Released: January 26, 2018

Used Future is the sixth studio album by American heavy metal band the Sword. Recorded in late 2017 at Flora Recording & Playback in Portland, Oregon, it was produced by Tucker Martine and was released on March 23, 2018, by Razor & Tie.

== Recording and production ==
The Sword began recording the follow-up to 2015's High Country in October 2017, working with producer Tucker Martine at his studio Flora Recording & Playback in Portland, Oregon. Recording was completed in November, with the album's title revealed during the original press release in October.

== Promotion and release ==
Used Future was officially announced for release on March 23, 2018, on January 26, when the lead single "Deadly Nightshade" was also released as a digital download.

== Track listing ==
No.	Title	Length
1.	"Prelude"	0:26
2.	"Deadly Nightshade"	3:00
3.	"Twilight Sunrise"	3:07
4.	"The Wild Sky"	3:34
5.	"Intermezzo"	1:32
6.	"Sea of Green"	5:37
7.	"Nocturne"	4:03
8.	"Don't Get Too Comfortable"	4:13
9.	"Used Future"	4:21
10.	"Come and Gone"	3:38
11.	"Book of Thoth"	2:50
12.	"Brown Mountain"	5:25
13.	"Reprise"	1:40
Total length:		43:36

== Personnel ==
- John D. Cronise – vocals, rhythm guitar
- Kyle Shutt – lead guitar
- Bryan Richie – bass, keyboards
- Santiago "Jimmy" Vela III – drums
- Tucker Martine – production

== Charts ==
Chart (2018)	Peak position
US Billboard 200	104
US Top Hard Rock Albums (Billboard)	6
US Top Rock Albums (Billboard)	16
US Top Tastemaker Albums (Billboard)	4
UK Rock & Metal Albums (OCC)	25
