= Gods of the Earth =

Studio album by The Sword
- Released: March 31, 2008 (release history)
- Recorded: 2007
- Studio: Folkvang Studios and Premium Recording (Austin, Texas)
- Genre: Doom metal, heavy metal, stoner rock
- Length: 47:59
- Label: Kemado
- Producer: J. D. Cronise

The Sword chronology
The Sword/Witchcraft split (2007)	Gods of the Earth (2008)	Warp Riders (2010)

Singles from Gods of the Earth
- 1. "Fire Lances of the Ancient Hyperzephyrians" Released: March 18, 2008 (US only)

Professional ratings
Review scores
Source	Rating
AllMusic	3.5/5 stars
Rolling Stone	3.5/5 stars

Gods of the Earth is the second studio album by American doom metal band The Sword, released in Europe on March 31, 2008, and in the United States on April 1. It gave the band their first experience of commercial success when it peaked at #102 on the Billboard 200 chart. The single released from the album was "Fire Lances of the Ancient Hyperzephyrians", which did not chart. Gods of the Earth was later re-released as part of a two-disc box set with Age of Winters on November 25, 2008. Their track "The Black River" was featured in the game Guitar Hero: Metallica, released in March 2009. "Maiden, Mother & Crone" is featured in Guitar Hero 5, released in September 2009.

== Track listing ==
All lyrics written by J. D. Cronise; all music composed by The Sword.

No.	Title	Length
1.	"The Sundering"	2:04
2.	"The Frost-Giant's Daughter"	5:02
3.	"How Heavy This Axe"	3:05
4.	"Lords"	4:57
5.	"Fire Lances of the Ancient Hyperzephyrians"	3:28
6.	"To Take the Black"	4:40
7.	"Maiden, Mother & Crone"	3:59
8.	"Under the Boughs"	4:57
9.	"The Black River"	5:53
10.	"The White Sea"	7:22
11.	"To Take the Black – Reprise" (hidden track)	2:23

Australian edition
No.	Title	Length
12.	"Nasty Dogs and Funky Kings" (ZZ Top cover)
13.	"The White Sea" (Live)

Japanese edition
No.	Title	Length
12.	"Sea of Spears"	4:46
13.	"To Take the Black" (Live)	4:38
14.	"He's Waiting" (The Sonics cover)	1:55

== Lyrics ==
Several songs reference Conan the Barbarian stories by fantasy author Robert E. Howard. "The Frost-Giant's Daughter" is based on Howard's short story by the same name and "The Black River" was inspired by "Beyond the Black River", while "How Heavy This Axe" makes references to Howard's fictional Hyborian Age. "To Take the Black" is a direct reference to the Night's Watch in George R. R. Martin's A Song of Ice and Fire.

== Personnel ==
The Sword

- J. D. Cronise – vocals, guitar, production, mixing
- Kyle Shutt – guitar, mixing
- Bryan Richie – bass, engineering, mixing
- Trivett Wingo – drums, percussion, mixing

Additional personnel

- Andrew Hernandez – engineering, mixing
- J. J. Golden – mastering
- Geoff Kern – artwork, design

== Release history ==
Region	Date	Label	Format	Catalog
Europe	March 31, 2008	Kemado Records	CD album	KEM 073
United States	April 1, 2008	Kemado Records	CD album	KEM 071
United States	April 1, 2008	Kemado Records	LP album	KEM 072
Australia	May 24, 2008	Impedance Records	CD album	IMP 006
Japan	June 11, 2008	Toy's Factory Records	CD album	TFCK-87438
