= High Country (song) =

Single by The Sword

from the album High Country
- Released: July 20, 2015
- Genre: Hard rock; stoner rock
- Length: 2:37
- Label: Razor & Tie
- Songwriters: J. D. Cronise; Kyle Shutt; Bryan Richie; Jimmy Vela
- Producer: Adrian Quesada

The Sword singles chronology
"The Hidden Masters/Arcane Montane" (2014)	"High Country" (2015)	"John the Revelator" (2016)

"High Country" is a song by American heavy metal band The Sword. Written by the band and produced by Adrian Quesada, it is the title track to the band's 2015 fifth studio album High Country. It was released as the first single from the album on July 20, 2015.

== Composition and style ==
According to MetalSucks writer Axl Rosenberg, "High Country" is stylistically different from much of the band's previously released material, marking a departure from the comparisons with Black Sabbath for which the band had been known. Rosenberg described the song as "totally retro" and proposed that it was "designed for use with marijuana".

== Release and reception ==
"High Country" was first made available for streaming on the band's website on July 1, 2015, when the title, release date and artwork of the album were first revealed. On July 20, the song was released as the first single from the album, as a limited edition 7" vinyl backed with previously unreleased B-side "Hexenringe". The single was made available at a number of independent record shops across the United States in a run of 1,000 copies, and came with a coupon providing $2 off the album.

In their review of High Country, Blabbermouth.net praised the title track as a highlight of the album, commending the performances of all four band members in descriptions of the "munching riffs" and "melodic rhythms". Rosenberg of MetalSucks also praised the song, described it as "totally groovy". Robert Pasbani of Metal Injection praised it as "good old fashioned rock n roll with a stoner tinge".

== Track listing ==
1. "High Country"
2. "Hexenringe"

== Personnel ==
- J. D. Cronise – vocals, guitar
- Kyle Shutt – guitar
- Bryan Richie – bass, synthesizers
- Santiago "Jimmy" Vela III – drums, percussion
- Adrian Quesada – production
- Stuart Sikes – engineering
- J. Robbins – mixing
- Jetter Green – artwork
