= High Country (album) =

Studio album by The Sword
- Released: August 21, 2015
- Recorded: March 16 – April 12, 2015
- Studio: Church House Studios (Austin, Texas); Level One Sound (Austin, Texas); High Country Atelier (Asheville, North Carolina)
- Genre: Hard rock; stoner rock
- Length: 50:10
- Label: Razor & Tie
- Producer: Adrian Quesada

The Sword chronology
Apocryphon (2012)	High Country (2015)	Low Country (2016)

Singles from High Country
- 1. "High Country" Released: July 17, 2015

High Country is the fifth studio album by American heavy metal band the Sword. Recorded at studios in Austin, Texas and Asheville, North Carolina with producer Adrian Quesada, it was released on August 21, 2015 by Razor & Tie. The album was mixed by J. Robbins, who had previously produced The Sword's 2012 fourth studio album Apocryphon. "High Country" was released as a single on July 20, 2015.

The album was largely a critical success. Commentators praised the change in musical style and levels of experimentation on High Country, with most noting a clear shift toward classic hard rock. Some reviewers, however, proposed that this change might alienate fans of the band, and some noted the presence of weaker tracks.

== Recording and production ==
The Sword first hinted that work on their fifth album had begun in November 2014. It was later announced in February 2015 that recording for the follow-up to 2012's Apocryphon would begin on March 16, with the eventual release scheduled for the summer. Former Grupo Fantasma guitarist and Grammy winner Adrian Quesada led production of the record, with fellow Grammy winner Stuart Sikes engineering and J. Robbins (who produced Apocryphon) mixing the album. Most of the recording took place at Church House Studios in Austin, Texas, with additional recording at Austin's Level One Sound and High Country Atelier in Asheville, North Carolina; Robbins mixed the album at his own studio, Magpie Cage in Baltimore, Maryland, and it was mastered by Dan Coutant at Sun Room Audio in Cornwall, New York.

== Promotion and release ==
Prior to beginning the recording of the album, The Sword completed a four-show warm-up tour between March 11 and 14, 2015, with performances in New Orleans, Louisiana; Monroe, Louisiana; Memphis, Tennessee; and Oklahoma City, Oklahoma. Upon the album's release, the group began the promotional High Country Tour, which started with a European leg running until September 19. The tour will move to North America in October, where the band is set to complete two legs of shows ending on December 19; support acts include Kadavar, All Them Witches and Royal Thunder.

Leading up to the release of the album, The Sword periodically released tracks from High Country through a number of news websites and outlets: first was the title track "High Country", which was unveiled on the band's official website on July 1, 2015, the same day on which the album's track listing and cover artwork were announced, which was followed by "Empty Temples" by Rolling Stone on July 16, "Mist and Shadow" by High Times on July 29, "The Dreamthieves" by Vice magazine's Noisey website on August 6, and "Early Snow" by Kerrang! on August 10.

High Country was released on CD, vinyl and digital download, and was available in a number of pre-order bundles including items such as clothing, lithographs and other merchandise. One of the bundles made available for the album was described by Exclaim! magazine as a "weed-themed deluxe edition", featuring a "wooden 'stash box,' wood grain dugout, grinder card and rolling papers", all of which are commonly used when smoking cannabis. Multiple retailer- and territory-exclusive coloured vinyls of the album will also be released.

== Composition and style ==
Numerous music critics have suggested that High Country is much more of a hard rock than a heavy metal album, as opposed to some of the band's earlier releases which were often classified as doom metal. Axl Rosenberg of MetalSucks suggested that the album's title track marked a departure from the band's stylistic similarity with Black Sabbath, while Exclaim! writer Alex Hudson suggested it had a "melodic southern rock vibe". Rolling Stone magazine likened the sound of "Empty Temples" to that of seminal hard rock bands Thin Lizzy and ZZ Top. AllMusic observed that the band had been gradually moving away from its initial heavy metal style, and that this album signaled a complete break. Upon debuting the track "The Dreamthieves" in August 2015, Vice site Noisey proposed that "above all else [The Sword] is a rock band", offering further comparisons to Thin Lizzy and Led Zeppelin. Kyle Shutt summarised the release by suggesting that High Country features "everything from folk to pop to boogie to straight-up rock".

Frontman John D. Cronise has commented on the stylistic change the band made on High Country. Noting that it was a conscious decision on the part of the group, he recognised that some fans may not approve of the change but proposed that if they had produced an album like their old material it "really wouldn't have been very genuine for us as musicians".

== Packaging ==
The album cover artwork for High Country was produced by Jetter Green. Speaking to Classic Rock magazine, Cronise revealed that he first saw Green's artwork by chance in a store, at which point he recalls thinking "that would look great on an album cover".

== Reception ==
=== Commercial ===
High Country was The Sword's first album to chart outside of the US and the UK, reaching number 74 on the Australian Albums Chart. In the UK, it reached number 11 on the Rock Albums Chart.

=== Critical ===
Professional ratings
Aggregate scores
Source	Rating
Metacritic	75/100
Review scores
Source	Rating
AllMusic	4/5 stars
Alternative Press	3.5/5 stars
The Austin Chronicle	2.5/5 stars
Blabbermouth.net	10/10
Classic Rock	7/10
Consequence of Sound	C+
Kerrang!	4/5 stars
Magnet	9/10
Ultimate Guitar Archive	8/10

Media response to High Country was mostly positive. Aggregating website Metacritic reports a normalized rating of 75 out of 100 based on seven critical reviews, indicating "generally favorable reviews". Blabbermouth.net's Ray Van Horn, Jr. awarded the album a perfect score of ten out of ten, praising various elements of the instrumentation and concluding that "There's depth, there's verve and there's veritably no predictability to it". AllMusic's James Christopher Monger described High Country as the band's "most compelling [album] to date", noting that the style of the release marked an obvious progression from the group's previous releases. Other reviewers also made similar observations, including Michael Toland of The Austin Chronicle, who applauded The Sword for "trying on new ... sounds" rather than continuing to emulate the style of Black Sabbath, as he claimed they did on their previous four albums. Music magazines Kerrang! and Magnet both published positive reviews, praising the musical experimentation and exploration of new styles on the album. Brandon East of the Ultimate Guitar Archive praised the performances of all band members on High Country, which he described as "immaculate", highlighting in particular drummer Santiago "Jimmy" Vela III.

Jon Hadusek of Consequence of Sound, however, balanced his praise of High Country as "a more engaging album than 2012's Apocryphon" with the proposition that the album still contains "some duds" – he criticised "Seriously Mysterious", "Tears Like Diamonds" and "Early Snow", claiming that on these songs "[frontman John D. Cronise's] voice lacks presence when it should be dominant in the sonic palette". He concluded by noting that "High Country is a decade-old band trying out different material. Sometimes it works, sometimes it doesn't". Monger made similar observations, labelling the album "clearly a transitional LP" and noting that "variety pulls its sense of melody to the forefront, though die-hards may find the subsequent loss of energy an uneven trade". Travis Marmon of Alternative Press proposed that "The songs don’t have the immediate impact of the band’s heavier work, but it’s nice to see The Sword break from their mold".

== Track listing ==
All lyrics are written by John D. Cronise; all music is composed by The Sword.

No.	Title	Length
1.	"Unicorn Farm"	0:50
2.	"Empty Temples"	3:55
3.	"High Country"	2:37
4.	"Tears Like Diamonds"	3:46
5.	"Mist & Shadow"	5:26
6.	"Agartha"	2:23
7.	"Seriously Mysterious"	2:45
8.	"Suffer No Fools"	2:43
9.	"Early Snow"	4:15
10.	"The Dreamthieves"	3:57
11.	"Buzzards"	4:13
12.	"Silver Petals"	2:37
13.	"Ghost Eye"	3:15
14.	"Turned to Dust"	3:31
15.	"The Bees of Spring"	3:57

== Personnel ==
- John D. Cronise – vocals, guitar
- Kyle Shutt – guitar
- Bryan Richie – bass, synthesizers, acoustic guitar (track 12)
- Santiago "Jimmy" Vela III – drums, percussion
- Adrian Quesada – production
- Stuart Sikes – engineering
- J. Robbins – mixing
- Matt Redenbo – mixing assistance
- Dan Coutant – mastering
- Jazz Mills – backing vocals (tracks 3, 7 and 10)
- Mark Gonzales – trombone (track 9)
- Gilbert Elorreagab – trumpet (track 9)
- Josh Levy – baritone saxophone (track 9)
- Kino Esparza – backing vocals (track 10)
- Jetter Green – artwork
- Scott Caligure – photography (cover)
- John Leach – photography (gatefold)
- Creative Militia – design

== Charts ==
Chart (2015)	Peak position
Australian Albums (ARIA)	74
German Albums Chart (Official Top 100)	91
UK Rock Albums Chart (OCC)	11
UK Albums Chart (OCC)	128
US Billboard 200	30
US Top Hard Rock Albums (Billboard)	4
US Top Rock Albums (Billboard)	7
