= Age of Winters =

Studio album by The Sword
- Released: February 14, 2006 (release history)
- Recorded: 2005 at Folkvang Studios, Austin, Texas
- Genre: Heavy metal, doom metal, stoner rock
- Length: 42:57
- Label: Kemado
- Producer: J. D. Cronise

The Sword chronology
Freya (2005)	Age of Winters (2006)	The Sword/Witchcraft split (2007)

Singles from Age of Winters
- 1. "Freya" Released: September 4, 2008 (UK only)

Age of Winters is the debut album by American heavy metal band The Sword, released in the United States on February 14, 2006. The Japanese edition, released by record label Toy's Factory, contains three bonus tracks recorded live at the CBGB club in New York City on April 9, 2006. The single released from the album was "Freya", which did not chart. Age of Winters was later reissued as part of a two-disc box set with Gods of the Earth on November 25, 2008.

== Reception ==
Professional ratings
Review scores
Source	Rating
AllMusic	4.5/5 stars
Blender	3.5/5 stars
PopMatters	7/10 stars

The Sword's debut album received a widely positive critical reaction. Reviewing for music website AllMusic, critic Eduardo Rivadavia awarded Age of Winters 4.5 out of 5 rating stars, qualifying it as an "AMG Album Pick". In the review, Rivadavia claims that the band's debut record "sees them joining California's High on Fire, Sweden's Witchcraft, and Australia's Wolfmother (to name but a few) at the forefront of what's gradually become known in the mid-'00s as the "heritage" or "retro-metal" movement." He goes on to suggest that "the album's main attraction [is] its megalithic guitar work," concluding that "Age of Winters provides [...] listeners with as good an entryway as any into the "retro-metal" universe, while also managing to sound refreshing even to calloused heavy metal ears," which, he suggests, "is no small achievement."

Other reviews of Age of Winters were similarly positive – webzine PopMatters, awarded the album a favorable rating of seven out of ten, describing it as "one fine, headbang-inducing beast of a debut record," while The Austin Chronicle summarised the album as "literate" and "visceral".

== In popular culture ==
"Freya" appears as a playable song in Guitar Hero II and Guitar Hero Smash Hits. as well as the soundtrack of Burnout Dominator, and Wayne. "Barael's Blade" was used in the season five American Dad! episode "Rapture's Delight". "Celestial Crown" is featured on the Jennifer's Body soundtrack. "Iron Swan" appears in the 2006 video game Tony Hawk's Project 8 and also appears in season nine American Dad! episode "Minstrel Krampus".

== Track listing ==
All lyrics are written by J. D. Cronise; all music is composed by The Sword.

No.	Title	Length
1.	"Celestial Crown"	1:57
2.	"Barael's Blade"	2:48
3.	"Freya"	4:34
4.	"Winter's Wolves"	4:36
5.	"The Horned Goddess"	5:01
6.	"Iron Swan"	5:46
7.	"Lament for the Aurochs"	7:59
8.	"March of the Lor"	4:41
9.	"Ebethron"	5:35
Total length:		42:57

Japanese edition
No.	Title	Length
10.	"Barael's Blade" (live at the CBGB)	3:02
11.	"Iron Swan" (live at the CBGB)	5:48
12.	"March of the Lor" (live at the CBGB)	5:06
Total length:		56:53

== Personnel ==
The Sword

- J. D. Cronise – vocals, guitars, production, mixing
- Kyle Shutt – guitars, mixing
- Bryan Richie – bass, engineering, mixing
- Trivett Wingo – drums, mixing

Additional personnel

- Mike Groener – additional vocal engineering
- Rick Essig – mastering
- Conrad Keely – artwork

== Release history ==
Region	Date	Label	Format	Catalog
United States	February 14, 2006	Kemado	CD album	KEM 027
Europe	March 27, 2006	Kemado	CD album	KEM 032
United States	July 18, 2006	Kemado	LP album	KEM 029
Europe	January 29, 2007	Kemado	LP album	KEM 048
Japan	May 2, 2007	Toy's Factory	CD album	TFCK-87417
