= John D. Cronise =

American singer-songwriter

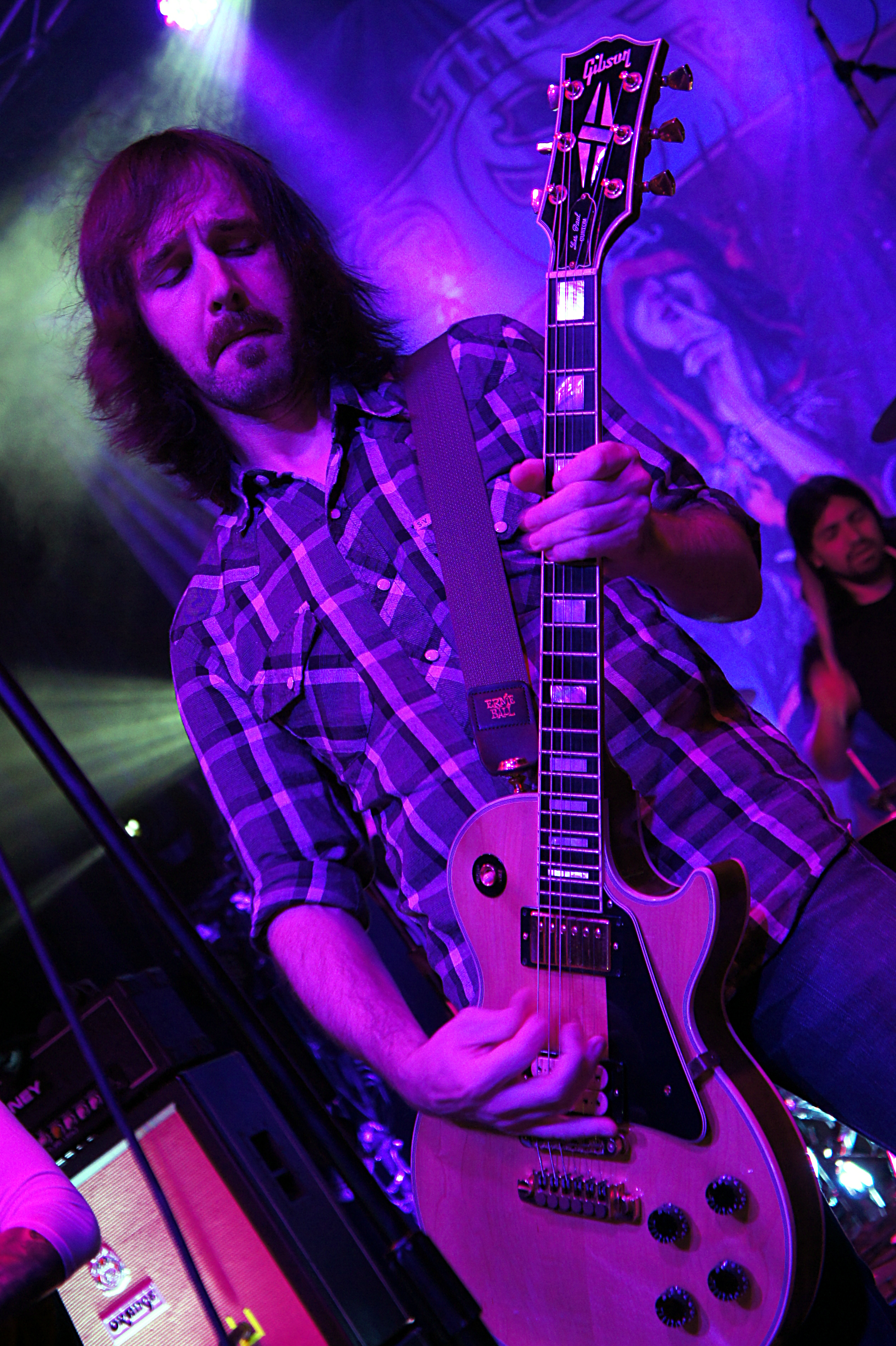
- Cronise performing with The Sword in 2013

Background information
- Also known as: J.D. Cronise
- Born: Roanoke, Virginia, U.S.
- Origin: Austin, Texas, U.S.
- Genres: Heavy metal; hard rock; stoner rock; doom metal
- Occupations: Musician; record producer
- Instruments: Guitar; vocals
- Years active: 1999–present
- Labels: Razor & Tie; Kemado

John D. Cronise, also credited as J.D. Cronise, is an American heavy metal musician and record producer. Originally from Roanoke, Virginia, he is best known as the lead vocalist, guitarist, primary songwriter and former producer for Austin, Texas-based band The Sword, which he co-founded in 2003. Prior to the formation of The Sword, he also performed in the bands Those Peabodys and Ultimate Dragons, the latter of which also featured original The Sword drummer Trivett Wingo.

== Early life ==
Originally from Roanoke, Virginia, as a child Cronise wanted to become a comic book artist, admitting he was "more interested in drawing [than songwriting] as a kid". He first started playing guitar at the age of 13; his first instrument was an Ibanez RG-550, although he had originally wanted a Gibson Les Paul as Jimmy Page had been his first main inspiration to play guitar.

== Career ==
=== 1999–2003: Early career ===
Cronise moved to Austin, Texas in 1999, claiming that he chose the location over larger cities like Los Angeles and New York City as it was a "laid back music town" at the time. After originally meeting and first performing together in Virginia, original The Sword drummer Trivett Wingo also moved to Austin a few years after Cronise, and the two returned to playing together "almost immediately" according to Cronise. Another band in which Cronise performed prior to the formation of The Sword was Those Peabodys, which he has described as "pretty much a straight-up rock 'n' roll band"; he claimed the reason he left the band was because he felt he "needed to do something heavier".

=== 2003–2022: The Sword ===
Cronise formed The Sword in 2003 with guitarist Kyle Shutt, bassist Bryan Richie, and drummer Trivett Wingo, after writing and recording music on his own for "a few years". The majority of the band's early material was written solely by Cronise before the band was formed, although when it was released in 2006 in the form of their debut album Age of Winters the musical compositions were credited to the band as a whole. For Age of Winters and the 2008 follow-up Gods of the Earth, Cronise was credited as producer in addition to his contributions of guitar and lead vocals.

Prior to the recording of the band's third album Warp Riders, Cronise enlisted in singing lessons to improve his vocal performances, claiming that he "stepped it up a little bit" for the album. Noting that his vocals were "probably the most criticized aspect of [the band's] music", he defended himself by claiming that "I hear what I meant to do", and proposing that maybe people "don’t really understand what we’re going for". Warp Riders was also the band's first album not to be produced by Cronise himself, instead featuring Matt Bayles; The Sword frontman remained away from production duties for the 2012 follow-up Apocryphon, with studio owner J. Robbins producing the album.

On October 20, 2022, Cronise posted to The Sword's official Instagram that he was splitting up the band after 19 years.

=== 2024: The Sword returns ===
After the breakup of the band in October 2022, The Sword announced a reunion show to take place on November 3, 2024, at the Austin Levitation Festival. Since that show, the band has announced that they have permanently reunited. The band has since celebrated the 15th anniversary of its epic space opera concept album Warp Riders with a re-release of the album as well as a European and two North American tours.

== Style and influences ==
=== Musical influences ===
One of Cronise's main musical inspirations is English hard rock band Led Zeppelin. In an interview in 2012, he claimed that he felt Led Zeppelin was "arguably the greatest rock band of all time", adding that "they were the reason [he] started playing guitar". Other bands named as inspiration by Cronise include Thin Lizzy, ZZ Top, Black Sabbath, AC/DC, and the Melvins. In reviews of the band's albums and shows, Cronise's vocal style has been compared to that of Ozzy Osbourne.

=== Songwriting ===
Many of Cronise's lyrics on The Sword songs are influenced by literature, including the works of authors such as George R. R. Martin and Jack Vance; Gods of the Earth track "To Take the Black", for instance, was written about the Night's Watch, a group from Martin's A Song of Ice and Fire novel series. Speaking about his philosophy on writing songs, Cronise has explained that "It's all meant to paint a picture, both the music and the lyrics. I start with an image, or a set of images, or a scene, and work from there", drawing similarities between writing songs and drawing pictures. He went on to admit that he is inspired by literature, movies, history, and folklore, and named H. P. Lovecraft as his favourite author (as well as mentioning Robert E. Howard as another influence). It has also been noted that progressive metal band Queensrÿche, French animator and director René Laloux, and Peruvian-American author Carlos Castaneda influenced Cronise during the writing of Warp Riders.

When asked in an interview in 2012 about whether he had "shied away from using [his] own viewpoint and perspective in songwriting" on albums prior to Apocryphon, Cronise admitted that he was "hesitant" to convey his thoughts and opinions on early material, and that he now felt like he had "gotten to the point where [he] can tell people what [he] thinks and not really give a shit about what they think about [it]". He has also stated that he "takes a lot of time on [his] lyrics", claiming that "If you aren't following along with the lyric sheet when you are listening to it then you aren't getting the whole picture of the music".

== Equipment ==
Cronise is endorsed by guitar manufacturer B.C. Rich, and has been known to play their Mockingbird Exotic Classic and Bich Double Neck models. Aside from B.C. Rich, he has also played a number of variations of the Gibson Explorer, and a Gibson Les Paul Custom.

Speaking in an interview after the release of Apocryphon, the guitarist claimed that the band had been using mainly the same equipment since they formed, with the exception of "some new guitars here and there", and that he had been an exclusive user of Orange amplifiers since 1998.

== Discography ==
with Those Peabodys

- Unite Tonight (2003)

with The Sword

- Age of Winters (2006)
- Gods of the Earth (2008)
- Warp Riders (2010)
- Apocryphon (2012)
- High Country (2015)
- Used Future (2018)
