= Rock Hard Festival =

Music festival held in Gelsenkirchen, Germany

- Genre: Heavy metal
- Dates: weekend of Pentecost
- Locations: Gelsenkirchen, Germany
- Years active: 2003–present
- Website: www.rockhardfestival.de

Rock Hard Festival is a heavy metal festival organized and sponsored by the Rock Hard magazine. First established in Lichtenfels, Bavaria, Germany, in 1990 on an irregular basis, mostly for magazine anniversaries, it is held annually in Gelsenkirchen, since 2003. Its 2016 edition was taken place on 13–15 May 2016.

The 2003 festival was also initially planned for the 20th anniversary of the magazine as a single event. But the fans voted it as the best metal open-air in Germany and so they continued. The festival is still held at the amphitheater which is located directly at the Rhein-Herne-Kanal in the Nordsternpark in Gelsenkirchen. The amphitheater has a maximum capacity of 7,000 people. The festival was the only festival with international metal bands in the Ruhrgebiet area until the Rock am Ring offshoot Rock im Revier, which was organized by the Nürburgring operating company Deutsche Entertainment AG (DEAG), took place in Gelsenkirchen in 2015. Kreator canceled the show at Rock im Revier for their headlining appearance at the smaller Rock Hard Festival.

== Lineups ==
=== 2016 ===
Friday 13 May	Saturday 14 May	Sunday 15 May
Sodom Destruction Tankard Satan Year of the Goat Sulphur Aeon	Turbonegro Metal Church Kadavar The Exploited Grand Magus Tribulation Sorcerer Accu§er	Blind Guardian Cannibal Corpse Riot V Moonspell Orden Ogan Nightingale Black Trip Discreation

=== 2015 ===
Friday 22 May	Saturday 23 May	Sunday 24 May
Venom Pentagram Space Chaser God Dethroned Flotsam and Jetsam Architects of Chaoz	Kreator Doro Sanctuary Kataklysm Avatarium Voivod Motorjesus Deserted Fear	Black Star Riders Overkill Michael Schenker's Temple of Rock Refuge Sinner Air Raid Channel Zero Spiders

=== 2014 ===
Friday 6 June	Saturday 7 June	Sunday 8 June
Triptykon Die Apokalyptischen Reiter Midnight Decapitated Zodiac Nocturnal	Carcass Sacred Reich Obituary Pretty Maids Sólstafir Screamer Dead Lord Roxxcalibur	Testament (replacing Megadeth) Tesla Annihilator Monster Magnet Insomnium Orphaned Land Blues Pills Iron Savior

=== 2013 ===
Friday 17 May	Saturday 18 May	Sunday 19 May
U.D.O. Ashes of Ares Audrey Horne Denial of God (replacing Nachtmystium) Fleshcrawl Hellish Crossfire	Queensrÿche D-A-D Ensiferum Naglfar Desaster Mustasch Horisont Slingblade	King Diamond Sepultura Threshold Tank Orchid Orden Ogan Gospel of the Horns Attic

=== 2012 ===
Friday 25 May	Saturday 26 May	Sunday 27 May
Turbonegro Kvelertak Krisiun Ram Jex Thot Deathfist	Bolt Thrower Psychotic Waltz Tankard Unleashed Hell Portrait Motorjesus Dr. Living Dead!	W.A.S.P. Unisonic Magnum Girlschool Graveyard High Spirits '77 Alpha Tiger

=== 2011 ===
Friday 10 June	Saturday 11 June	Sunday 12 June
Triptykon Enslaved Primordial Postmortem Procession Contradiction	Iced Earth Amorphis Morgoth Bullet Epica Disbelief In Solitude Dreamshade	Down Overkill Vicious Rumors Anacrusis Metal Inquisitor Atlantean Kodex Enforcer Vanderbuyst

=== 2010 ===
Friday 21 May	Saturday 22 May	Sunday 23 May
The Devil's Blood Bloodbath Sabaton Katatonia Necros Christos Ketzer	Kreator Accept Exhorder Raven Artillery Bulldozer Evile Orden Ogan	Rage & Lingua Mortis Orchestra Sonata Arctica Nevermore Virgin Steele Orphaned Land Crashdïet Keep of Kalessin Sacred Steel

=== 2009 ===
Friday 29 May	Saturday 30 May	Sunday 31 May
Opeth Jag Panzer Prong Deströyer 666 Angel Witch Witchburner	Children of Bodom Jon Oliva's Pain Forbidden DragonForce Hail of Bullets Audrey Horne Grand Magus Evocation	Saxon Sacred Reich UFO Heathen D-A-D Bullet Firewind Tracedawn

=== 2008 ===
Friday 9 May	Saturday 10 May	Sunday 11 May
Testament (replacing Celtic Frost) Die Apokalyptischen Reiter Y&T Lake of Tears Stormwarrior The Claymore	Immortal Exodus Amorphis Exciter Enslaved Helstar Moonsorrow The Sorrow	Iced Earth Paradise Lost Volbeat Napalm Death Jorn Asphyx Sieges Even Enemy of the Sun

=== 2007 ===
Friday 25 May	Saturday 26 May	Sunday 27 May
HammerFall Grave Digger Heaven Shall Burn Cataract Crucified Barbara Bullet	Amon Amarth Death Angel Armored Saint Vader Ross the Boss Korpiklaani Turisas Maroon Metal Inquisitor	Thin Lizzy Axel Rudi Pell Paul Di'Anno Spock's Beard Tankard Dark Funeral Dew-Scented (replacing Naglfar) Hardcore Superstar Sabaton
