= In the Mouth of Madness (disambiguation) =

In the Mouth of Madness is a 1994 horror film directed by John Carpenter.

In the Mouth of Madness may also refer to:

- In the Mouth of Madness (soundtrack), 1995 soundtrack album for the film, and the title song
- In the Mouth of Madness (Luni Coleone album), a 2001 album by Luni Coleone

== See also ==
- The Mouths of Madness, a 2013 album by Orchid
- At the Mountains of Madness (disambiguation)
