= Contradiction (disambiguation) =

A contradiction is a logical incompatibility between two or more propositions

Contradiction may also refer to:

- Contradiction (album), a 1976 album by The Ohio Players
- Contradiction (band)
- Contradictions, a 1999 album by One Gud Cide
- Contradiction: Spot the Liar!, a 2015 detective FMV game by Tim Follin

== See also ==
- Contradictions of the bible
- Contradictories, or the square of opposition
- Proof by contradiction
- Paradox
