= Zodiac (German band) =

German hard rock band

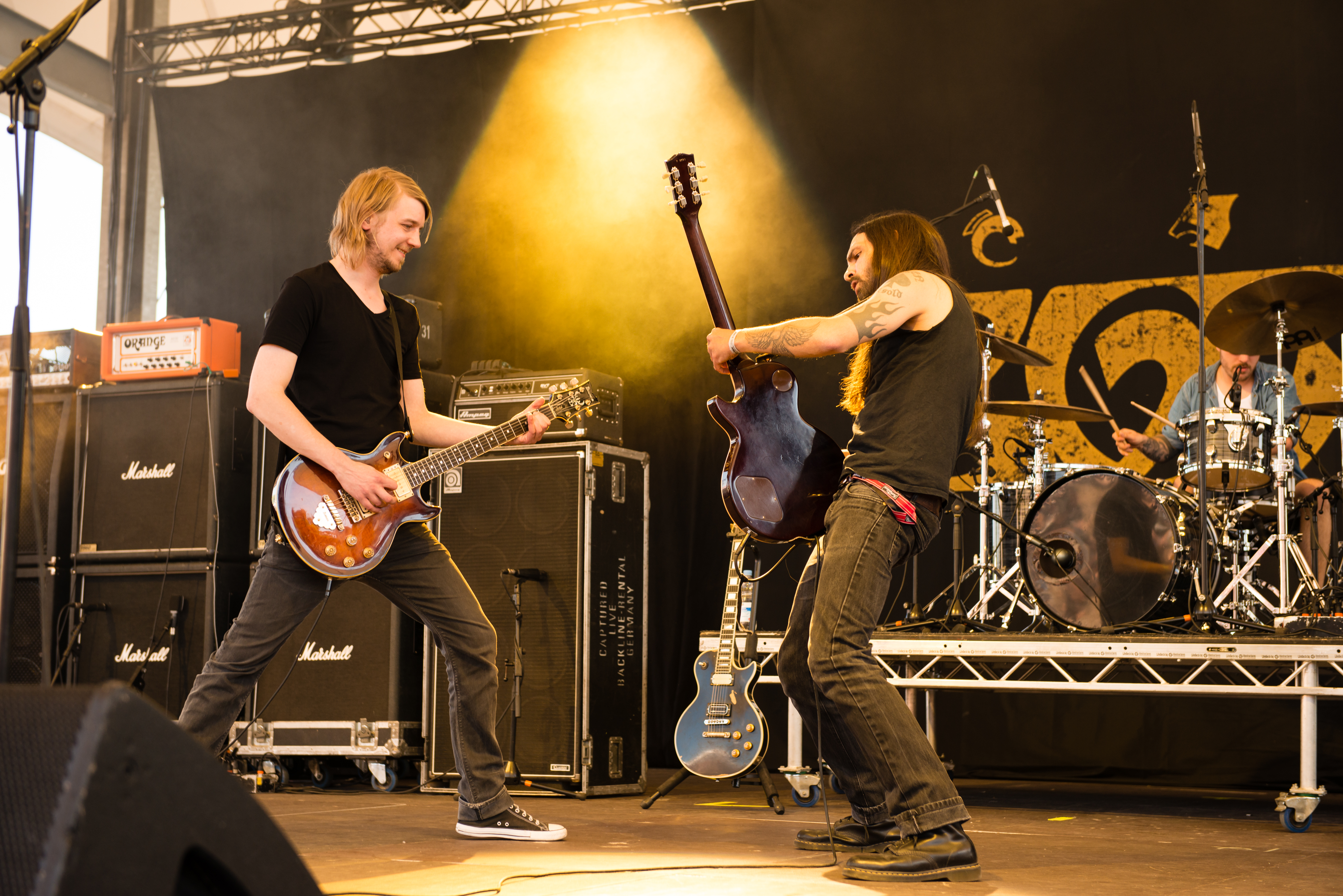
- Zodiac at the Rock Hard Festival in 2014.

Background information
- Origin: Münster, Germany
- Genres: Hard rock, blues rock
- Years active: 2010–present
- Labels: Napalm Records, Prosthetic Records
- Members: Nick Van Delft; Stephan Gall; Ruben Claro; Janosch Rathmer
- Past members: Robert Kahr
- Website: zodiac-rock.com

Zodiac are a hard rock band from Münster, Germany. The band was formed in 2010 by singer-guitarist Nick Van Delft and Long Distance Calling drummer Janosch Rathmer. Stephan Gall and Robert Kahr joined shortly after to complete the line-up before Ruben Claro replaced Kahr in 2012. The band are heavily influenced by rock and blues music from the 1970s and it adds to the theme and style of their own music. As of 2016, they have made four studio albums.

== History ==
=== Founding and A Bit Of Devil (2010 to 2012) ===
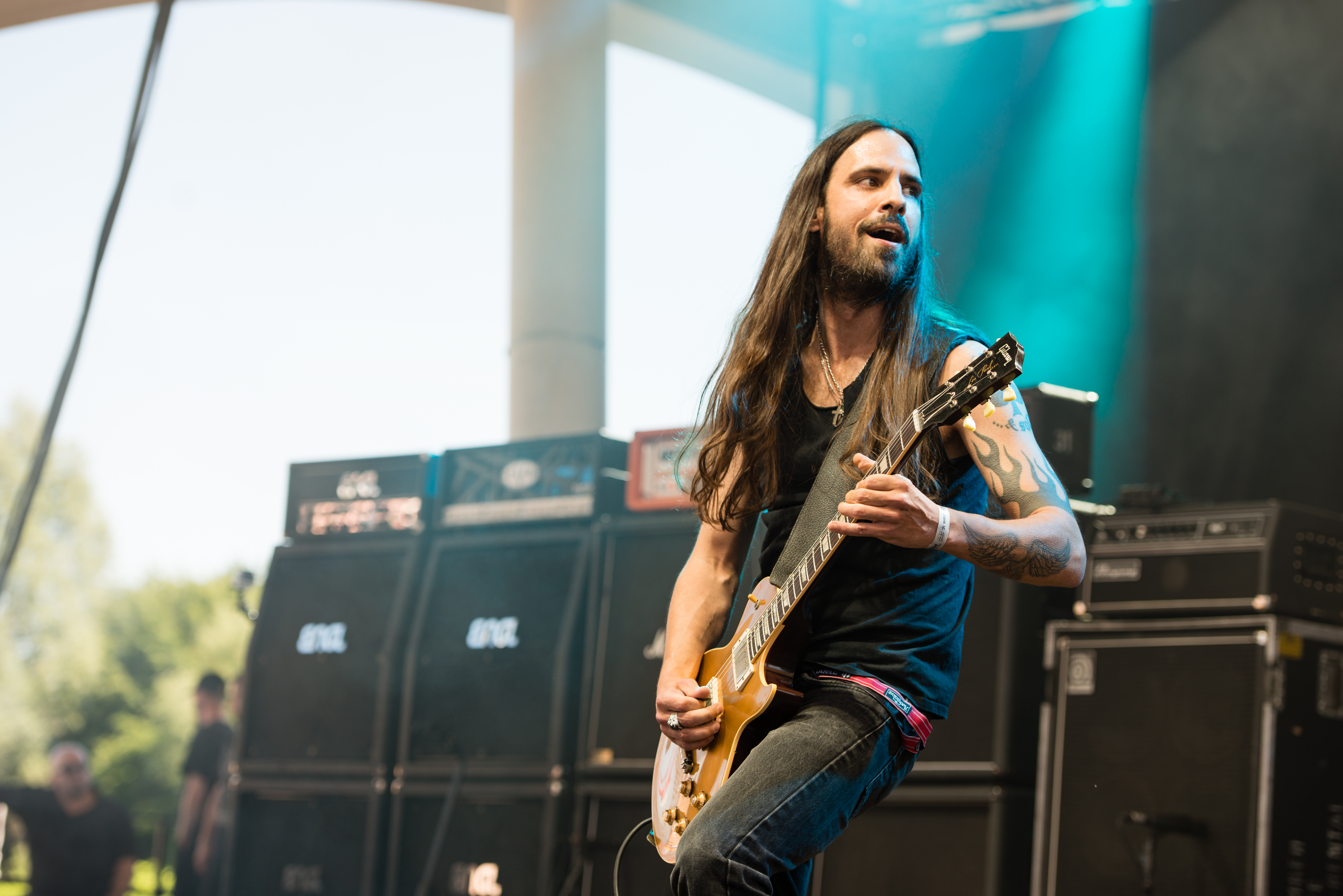
Lead guitarist and vocalist Nick van Delft

Guitarist Stephan Gall and drummer Janosch Rathmer had previously spent eight years with melodic death metal band Misery Speaks. Following the break-up of the band in 2010, Gall and Rathmer still wanted to pursue their music careers. Rathmer met Nick Van Delft that same year and after several weeks of jamming, they started planning to create a new band. Van Delft wanted the band to be a trio before Rathmer persuaded him to be in a band with a second guitar. Gall was invited by Rathmer to join the band with Robert Kahr joining around the same time on bass and keyboards. Rathmer choose the band name after the astrological term.

In April 2011, the band played their first gigs before their debut record was released- a self-titled EP. Shortly afterwards, Gall and Rathmer founded their own record label named Honest Hound Records. The band's debut studio album A Bit Of Devil was released on 25 May 2012 and the band toured in autumn 2012 with bands such as The Sword and Spiritual Beggars.

=== A Hiding Place and Sonic Child (2013 to 2014) ===
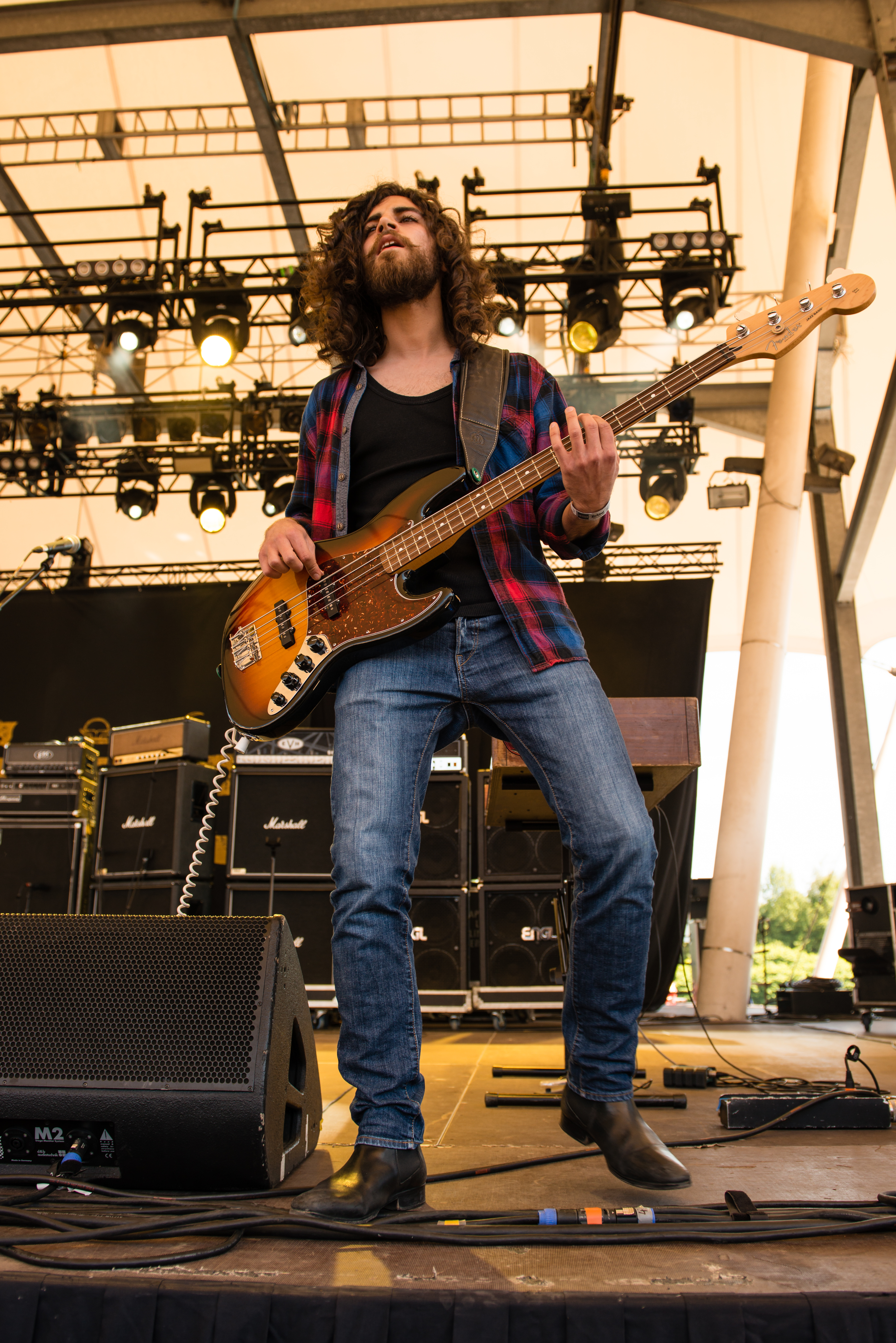
Bassist, keyboardist and backing vocalist Ruben Claro

When Robert Kahr left the band in 2012, Ruben Claro replaced him playing the same instruments and adding backing vocals to the band. Zodiac received a deal from Napalm Records in July 2013 before the release of the second studio album A Hiding Place in October the same year. As well as the debut album, A Hiding Place was also released under Prosthetic Records in the US. The album includes a cover of Cortez The Killer by Neil Young. The first and second tracks of the album Downtown and Free were both released with music videos that can be found on YouTube as well as a lyric video for the fifth track Moonshine. Downtown was also released as the only single of the album. In late 2013, the band had to cancel a tour supporting stoner rock band Monster Magnet after their visas were denied.

Instead, Zodiac went on a small European tour with Orchid and Blues Pills and began preparations for their third studio album. In March 2014, the band supported acts Audrey Horne and Grand Magus in Scandinavia before recording for their next album two months later. The album Sonic Child was released on 19 September 2014 with ten tracks, two bonus tracks and four live performances. Sonic Child debuted at number 47 on the German album charts.

=== Road Tapes Vol. 1 (2014–present) ===
In autumn 2014, Zodiac headlined for the first time on tour in Germany. The band used 17 concerts during the tour to record for the band's first live album Road Tapes Vol. 1. The album was released on 17 April 2015 and included songs performed live from their previous three studio albums.

In June 2015, the band posted a link to their music video for A Bit Of Devil while commenting that songwriting had begun for their fourth studio album.

== Style ==
Zodiac's style is a mix of hard rock, blues rock and classic rock from the 1970s. Drummer Janosch Rathmer labelled Led Zeppelin, Pink Floyd, Thin Lizzy, Stevie Ray Vaughan, ZZ Top and Joe Bonamassa as influences.

== Band members ==
Current members

- Nick Van Delft – lead vocals, lead guitar (2010–present)
- Stephan Gall - rhythm guitar (2010–present)
- Ruben Claro – bass, keyboards, backing vocals (2012–present)
- Janosch Rathmer – drums, percussion (2010–present)

Former members

- Robert Kahr – bass, keyboards (2010–2012)

== Discography ==
=== Studio albums ===
- A Bit Of Devil (2012)

  1. A Bit Of Devil
  2. Carnival
  3. Blue Jean Blues
  4. Horrorvision
  5. Assembly Line
  6. Thunder
  7. Diamond Shoes
  8. Coming Home

- A Hiding Place (2013)

  1. Downtown
  2. Free
  3. Underneath My Bed 
  4. Leave Me Blind 
  5. Moonshine 
  6. Believer 
  7. I Wanna Know Part 1 
  8. I Wanna Know Part 2 
  9. Cortez the Killer 
  10. Sleep of the Hollow - Bonus Track
  11. Leave Me Blind - Bonus Track

- Sonic Child (2014)

  1. Intro: Who I Am
  2. Swinging On The Run 
  3. Sonic Child 
  4. Holding On
  5. Sad song 
  6. Out Of The City
  7. A Penny And A Dead Horse 
  8. Good Times 
  9. Rock Bottom Blues 
  10. Just Music
  11. Not Fragile (Bonus Track)
  12. Shine On (Bonus Track)
      Bonus CD:
   1. Free (Live At Rock Hard Festival 2014)
   2. Cortez The Killer (Live At Rock Hard Festival 2014)
   3. Upon The Stone (From The Demo 2011)
   4. Failure (From The Demo 2011)

- Grain of Soul (2016)

  1. Rebirth By Fire 
  2. Animal
  3. Follow You
  4. Down 
  5. Faithless
  6. Crow
  7. Ain't Coming Back
  8. Get Out 
  9. Like The Sun
  10. Sinner
  11. Grain Of Soul

=== EPs ===
- Zodiac (2011)

=== Live albums ===
- Road Tapes Vol. 1 (2015)

     1. Swinging On The Run	
     2. Free	
     3. Holding On	
     4. Cortez The Killer	
     5. A Bit Of Devil	
     6. Rock Bottom Blues	
     7. Diamond Shoes	
     8. A Penny And A Dead Horse	
     9. Moonshine	
     10. Coming Home
