= Nordsternpark =

Coordinates: 51.5236°N 7.0333°E

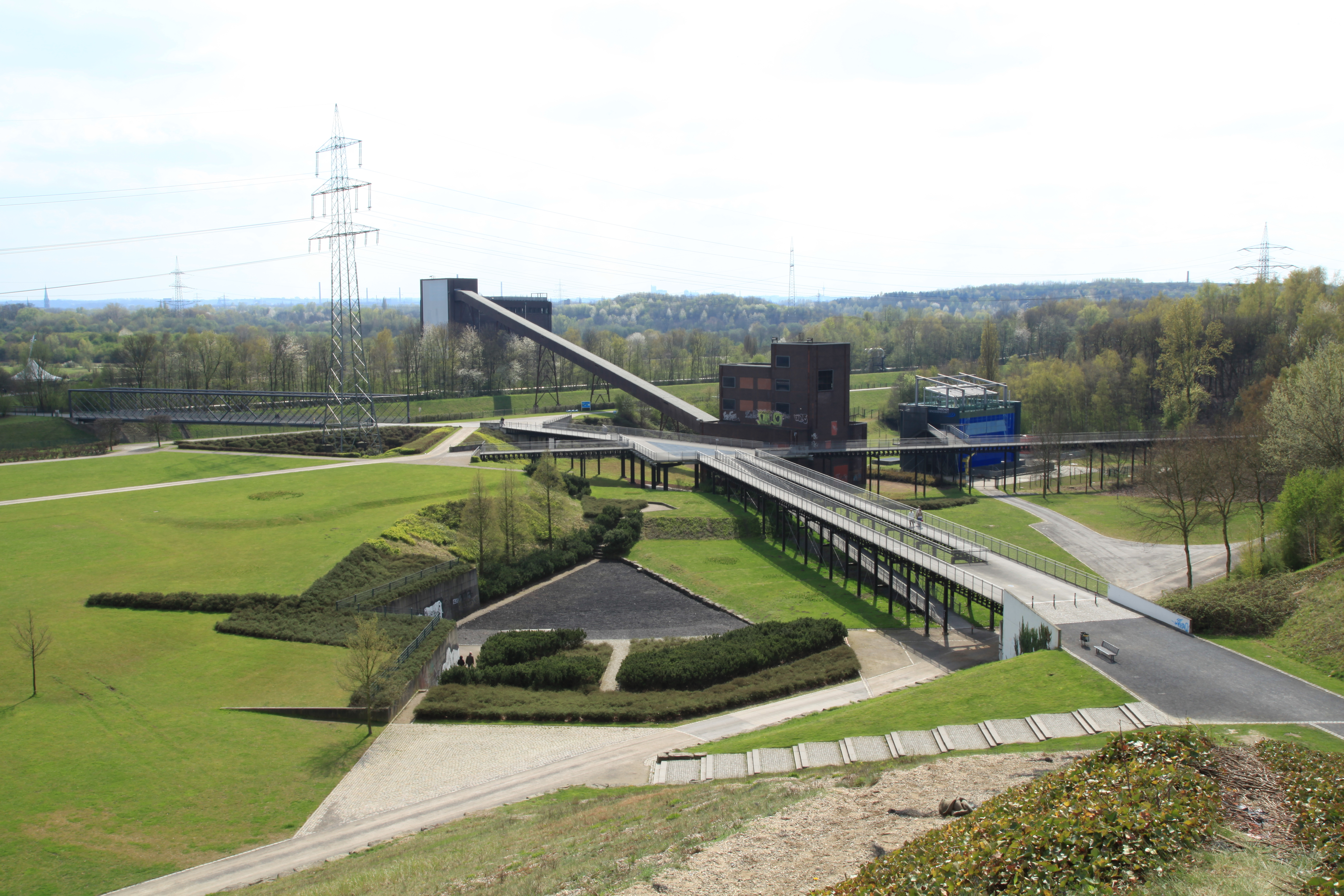
Central area of Nordsternpark

Nordsternpark (lit. North Star Park) is a park in Gelsenkirchen, Germany. It is located on the compound of former mine of Zeche Nordstern. After the closure of the mine in 1993 the area was redeveloped. In 1997, the Bundesgartenschau (Federal Garden Exhibition) took place here.

An amphitheater is located near the canal of Rhein-Herne-Kanal, where music festivals and other cultural events are taking place, among them the annual Rock Hard Festival.

The park is part of the European Garden Heritage Network and the Industrial Heritage Trail.
