= Gelsenkirchen =

Gelsenkirchen Gelsenkiärken (Westphalian)
- City
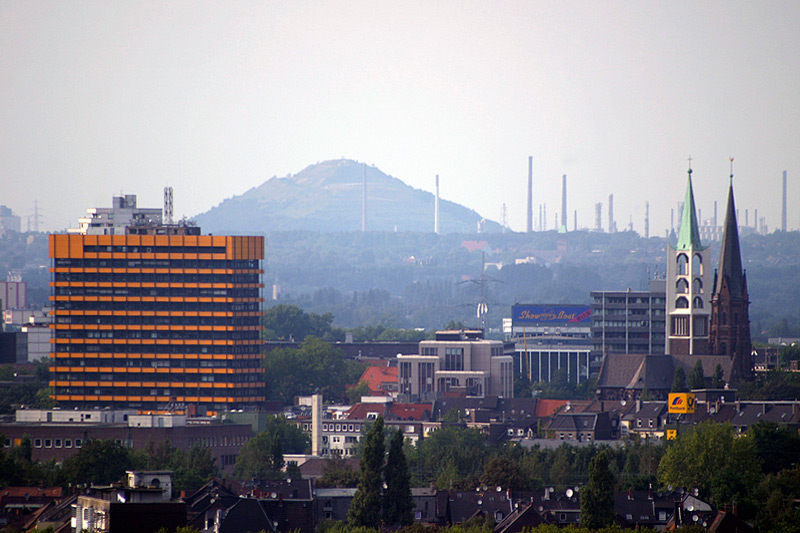
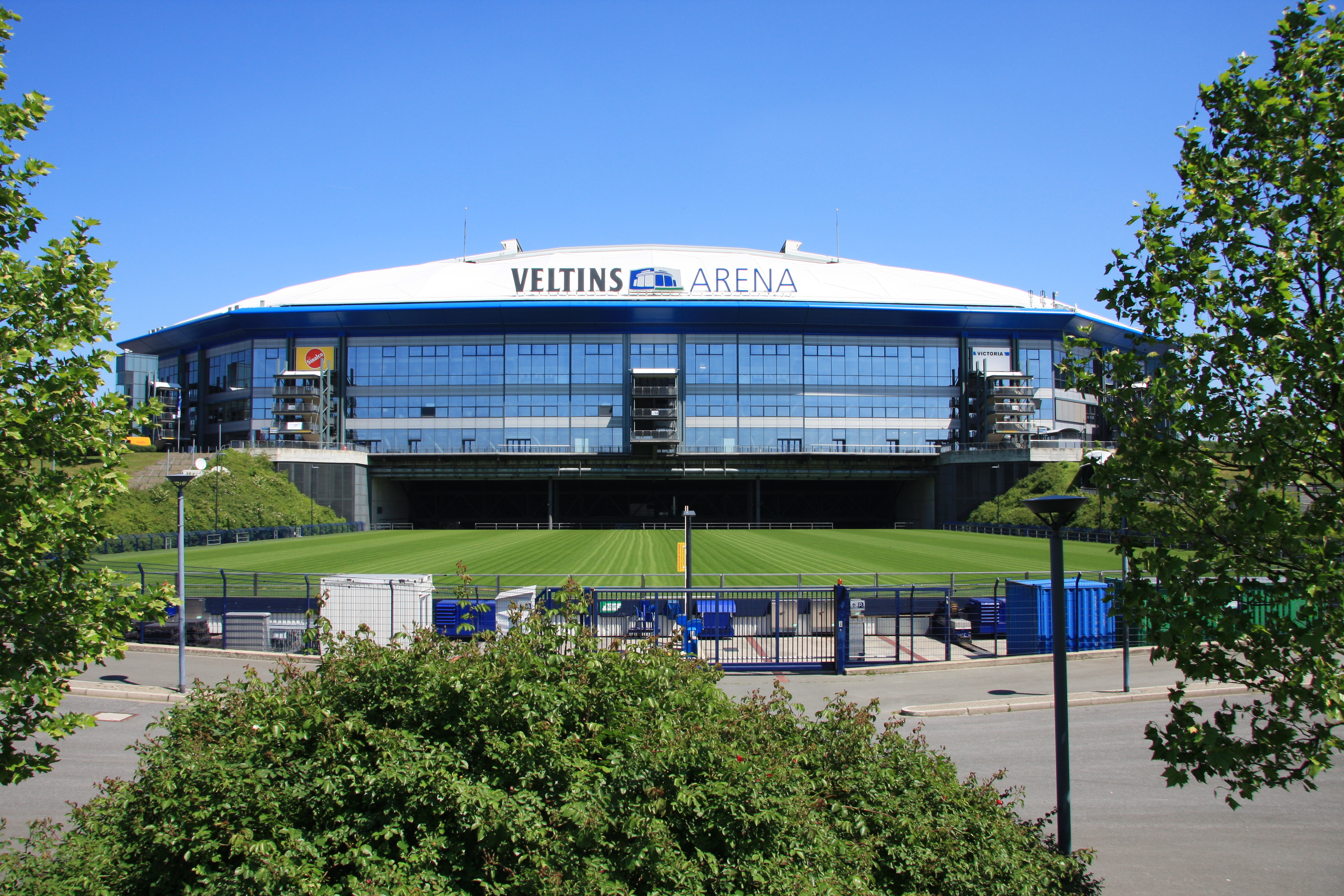
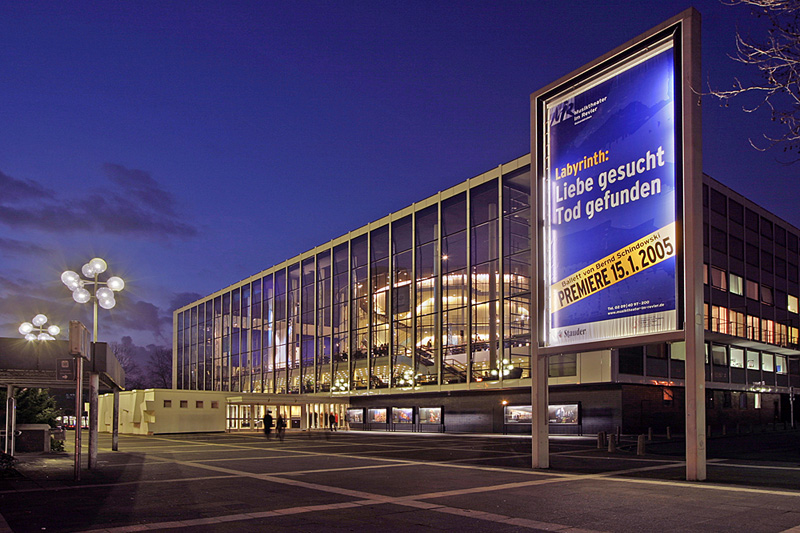
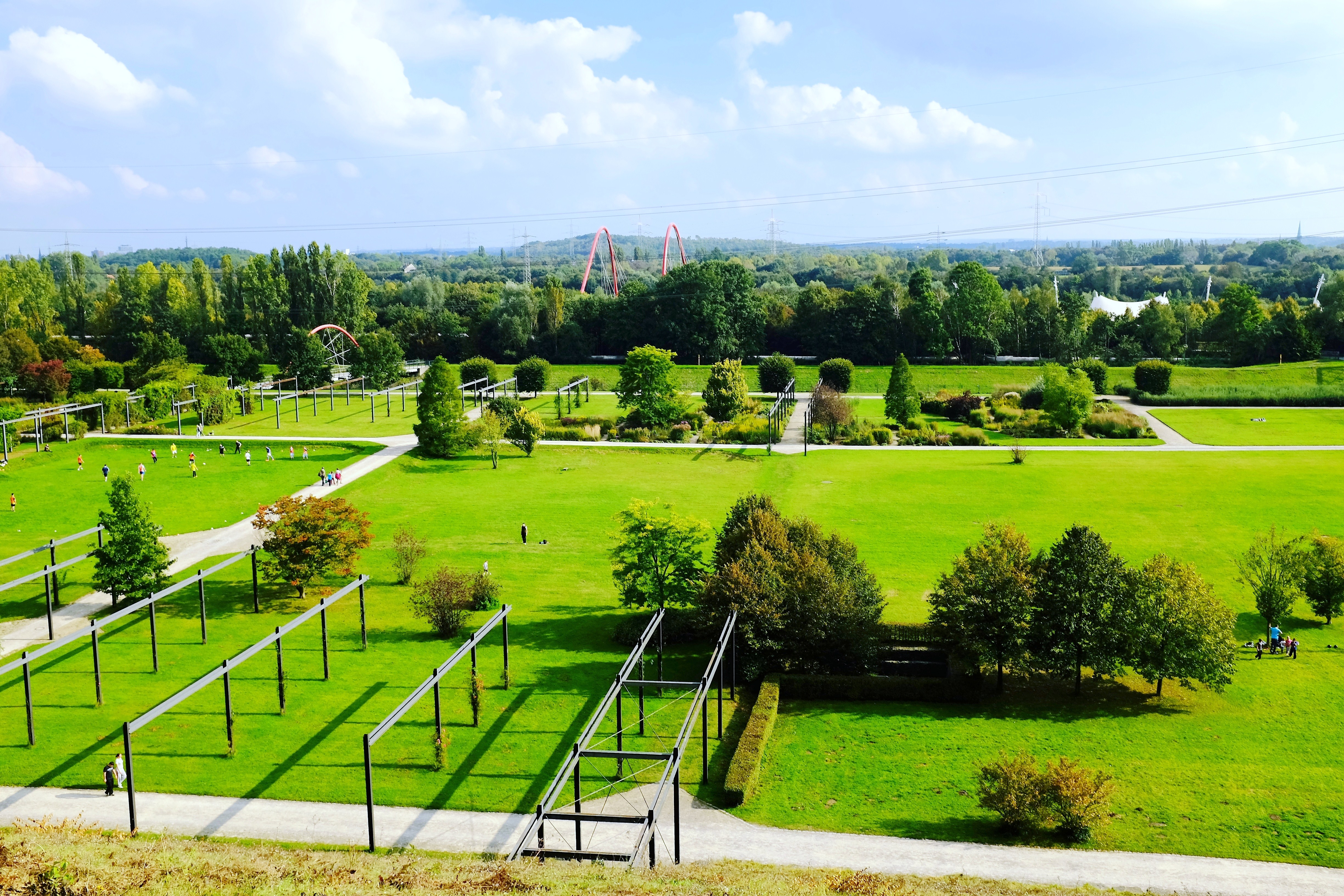
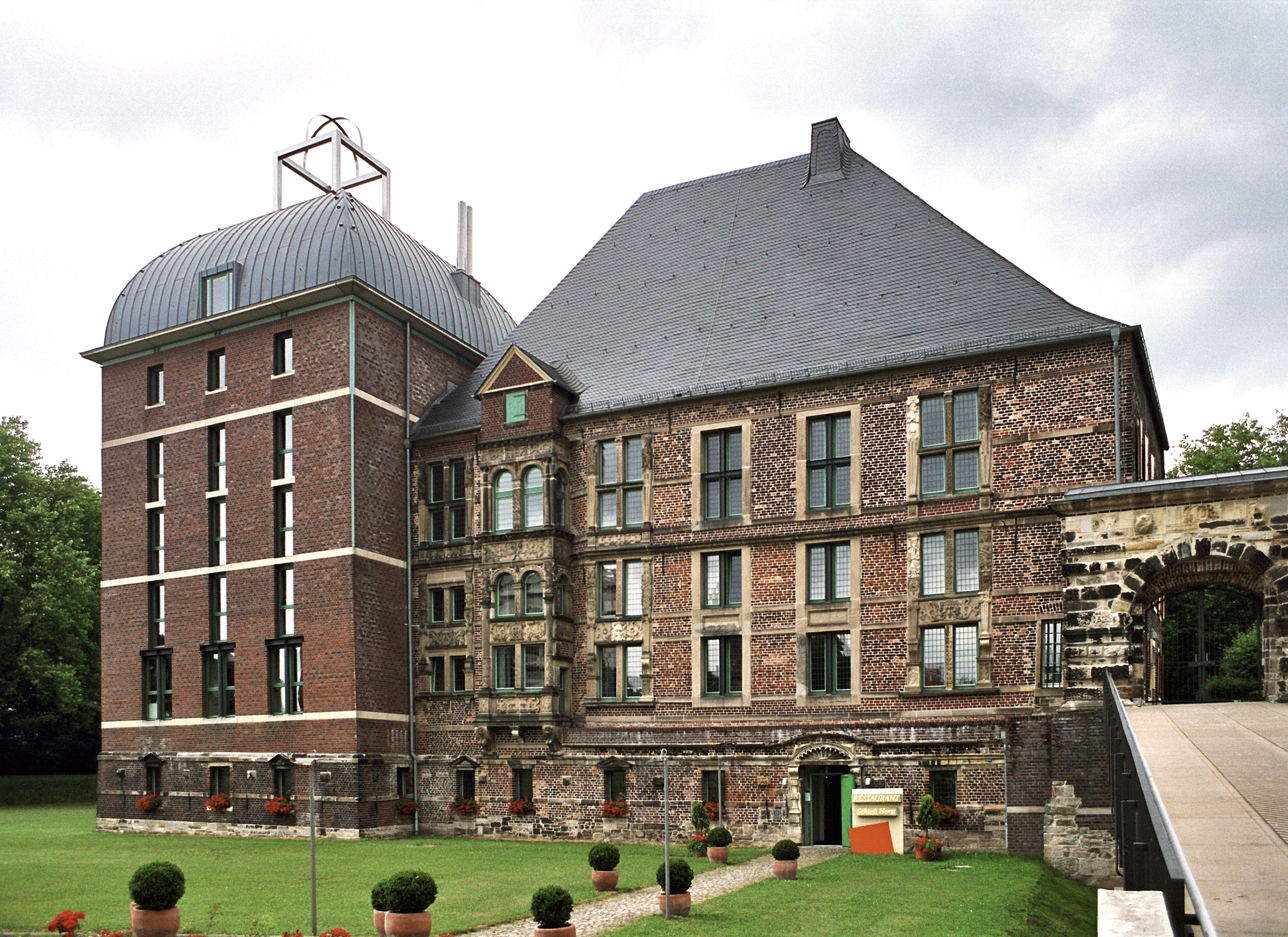
- View of Gelsenkirchen Arena AufSchalke Musiktheater im Revier Nordsternpark Horst Castle

- Flag Coat of arms
- Interactive map of Gelsenkirchen
- Location within Germany Location within North Rhine-Westphalia
- Coordinates: 51°30′37″N 7°5′39″E
- Country: Germany
- State: North Rhine-Westphalia
- Admin. region: Münster
- District: Urban district

Government
  - Mayor (2025–30): Andrea Henze (SPD)
  - Governing parties: SPD/ CDU

Area
  - Total: 104.84 km^{2} (40.48 sq mi)
- Elevation: 60 m (200 ft)

Population (2025-12-31)
  - Total: 266,199
  - Density: 2,539.1/km^{2} (6,576.2/sq mi)
- Time zone: UTC+01:00 (CET)
  - Summer (DST): UTC+02:00 (CEST)
- Postal codes: 45801–45899
- Dialling codes: 0209
- Vehicle registration: GE
- Website: gelsenkirchen.de

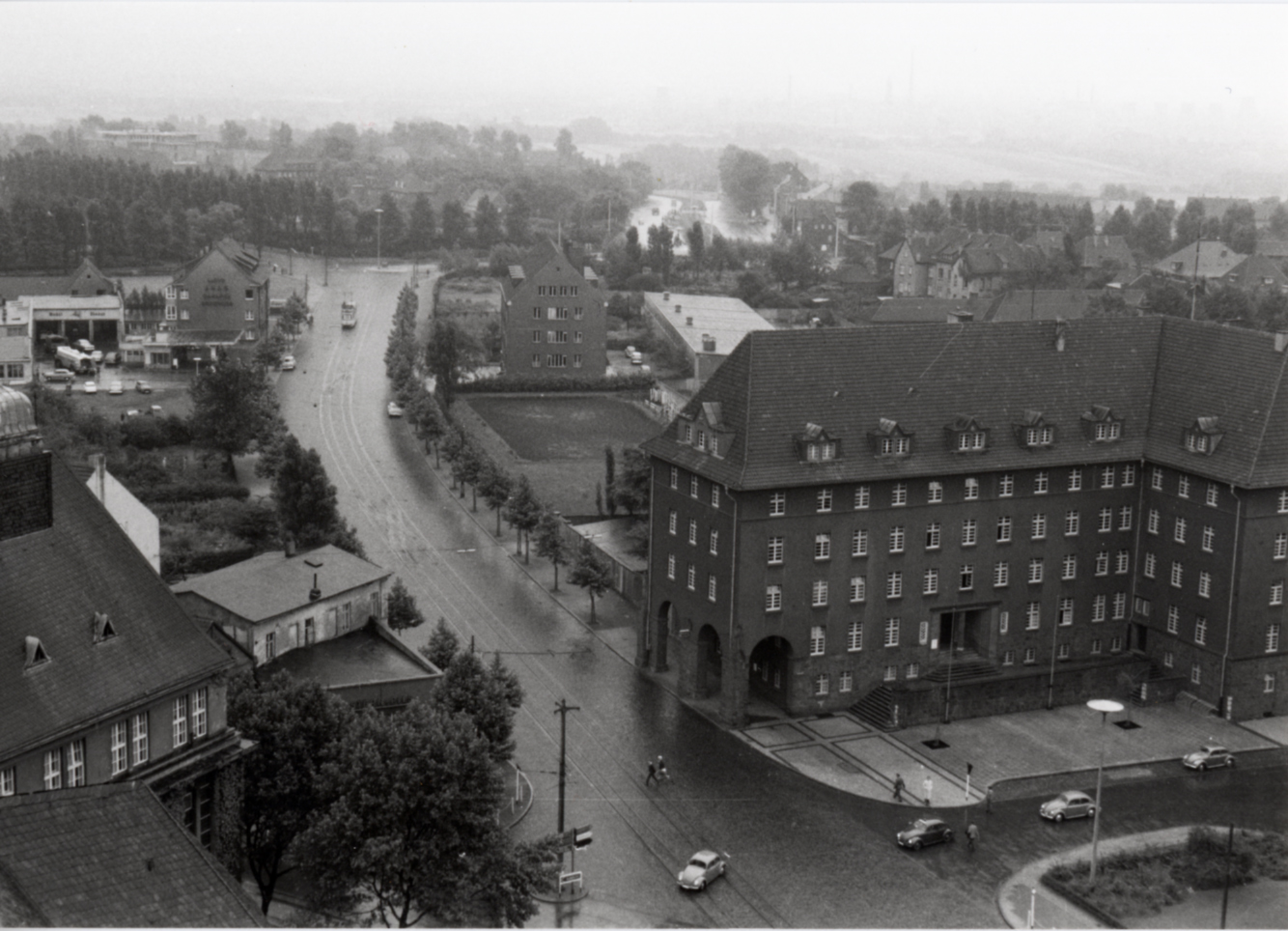
Gelsenkirchen-Buer looking south towards downtown Gelsenkirchen, 1955

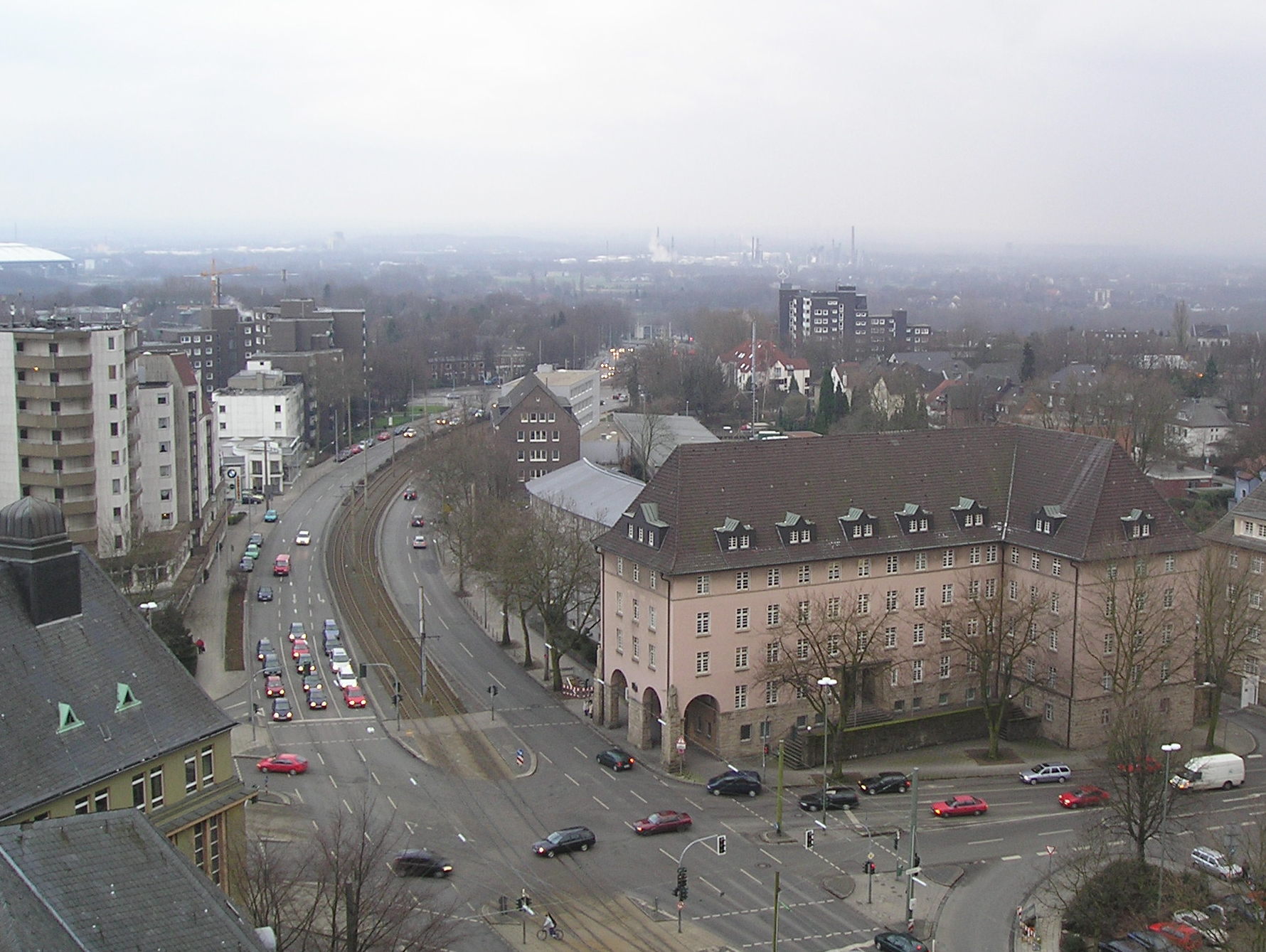
The same view 50 years later

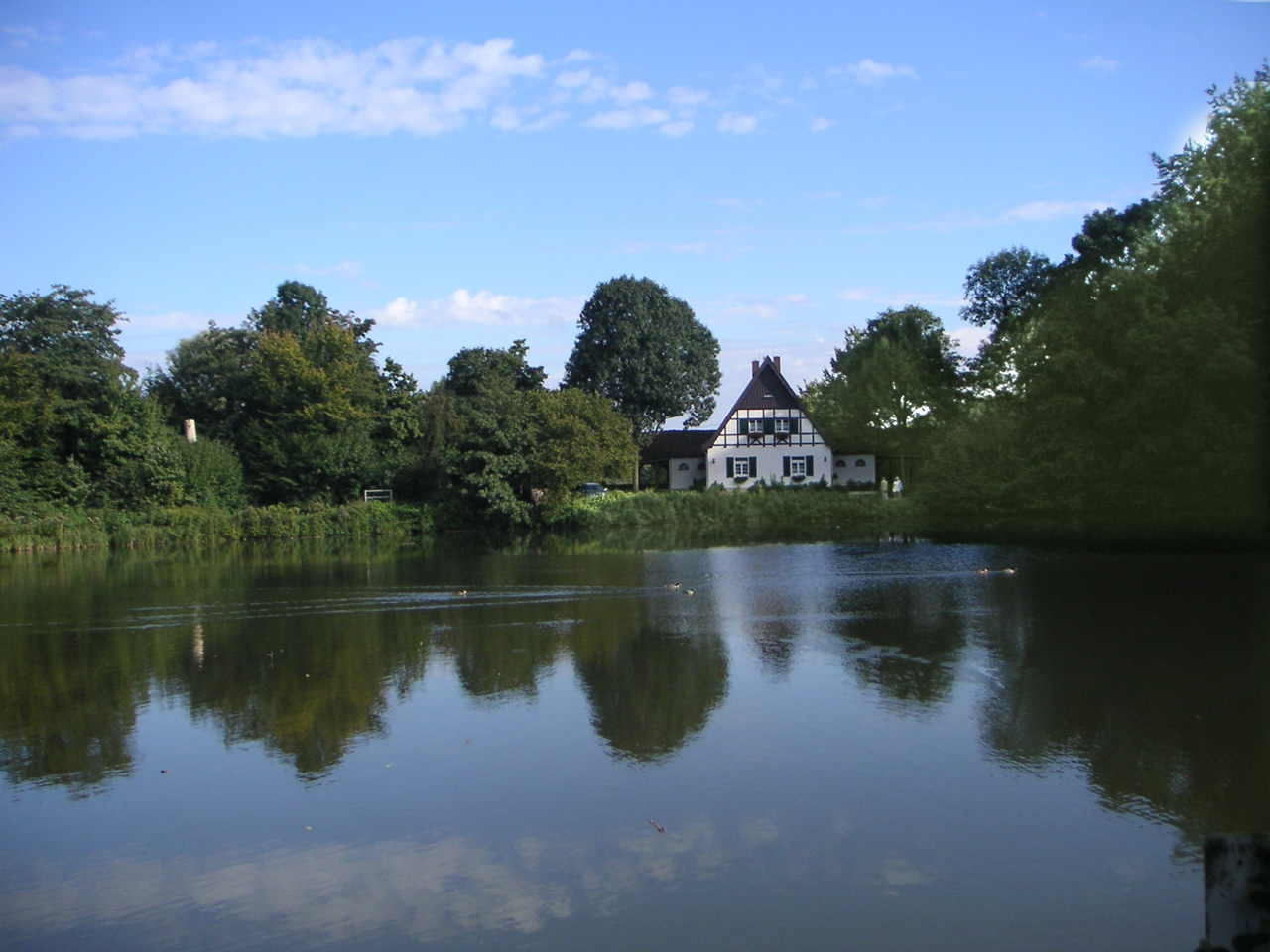
Municipal forest of Buer (Buerscher Stadtwald)

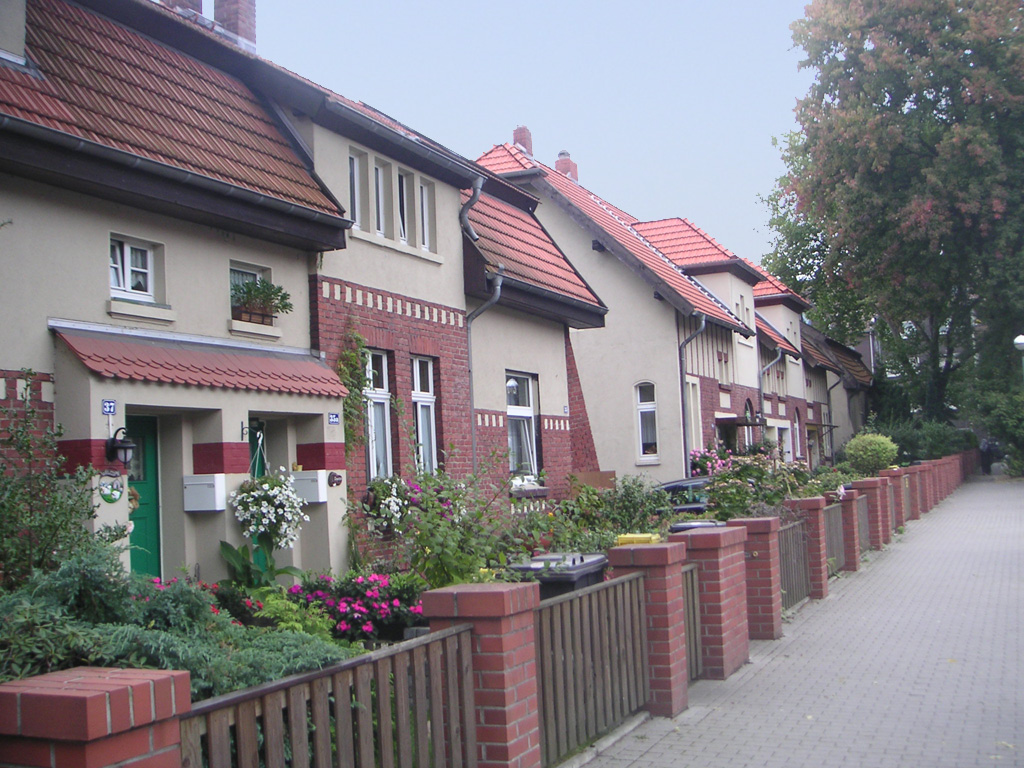
A former mining settlement

Gelsenkirchen (/ˌɡɛlzənˈkɪərxən, ˈɡɛlzənkɪərxən/; German: [ˌɡɛlzn̩ˈkɪʁçn̩]; Westphalian: Gelsenkiärken) is the 26th-most populous city of Germany and the 12th-most populous in the state of North Rhine-Westphalia with a population of 266,199 as of 2025. On the Emscher River (a tributary of the Rhine), it lies at the centre of the Ruhr area, the largest urban area of Germany, of which it is the fifth-largest city after Dortmund, Essen, Duisburg and Bochum. The Ruhr is located in the Rhine-Ruhr metropolitan region, the second-biggest metropolitan region by GDP in the European Union. Gelsenkirchen is the fifth-largest city of Westphalia after Dortmund, Bochum, Bielefeld and Münster, and it is one of the southernmost cities in the Low German dialect area. The city is home to the football club Schalke 04, which is named after Gelsenkirchen-Schalke. The club's current stadium Veltins-Arena, however, is located in Gelsenkirchen-Erle.

Gelsenkirchen was first documented in 1150, but it remained a tiny village until the 19th century, when the Industrial Revolution led to the economic and population growth of the region. In 1840, when the mining of coal began, 6,000 inhabitants lived in Gelsenkirchen; by 1900 the population had increased to 138,000. In the early 20th century, Gelsenkirchen was the most important coal mining town in Europe. It was called the "city of a thousand fires" for the flames of mine gases flaring at night. In 1928, Gelsenkirchen was merged with the adjoining cities of Buer and Gelsenkirchen-Horst. The city bore the name Gelsenkirchen-Buer, until it was renamed Gelsenkirchen in 1930. The city remained a center of coal mining and oil refining during the Nazi era, which led to it being a frequent target of Allied bombing raids during World War II: nevertheless, over a third of the city's buildings date from before 1949. There are no longer coalmines in and around Gelsenkirchen; the city is searching for a new economic basis, having been afflicted for decades with one of the country's highest unemployment rates.

== History ==
=== Ancient and medieval times ===
Although the part of town now called Buer was first mentioned by Heribert I in a document as Puira in 1003, there were hunting people on a hill north of the Emscher as early as the Bronze Age – earlier than 1000 BC. They did not live in houses as such, but in small yards gathered together near each other. Later, the Romans pushed into the area. In about 700, the region was settled by the Saxons. A few other parts of town which today lie in Gelsenkirchen's north end were mentioned in documents from the early Middle Ages, some examples being: Raedese (nowadays Resse), Middelvic (Middelich, today part of Resse), Sutheim (Sutum; today part of Beckhausen) and Sculven (nowadays Scholven). Many nearby farming communities were later identified as iuxta Bure ("near Buer").

It was about 1150 when the name Gelstenkerken or Geilistirinkirkin appeared up for the first time. At about the same time, the first church in town was built in what is now Buer. This ecclesia Buron ("church at Buer") was listed in a directory of parish churches by the sexton from Deutz, Theodericus. This settlement belonged to the Mark. However, in ancient times and even in the Middle Ages, only a few dozen people actually lived in the settlements around the Emscher basin.

=== Industrialisation ===
Up until the middle of the 19th century, the area in and around Gelsenkirchen was only thinly settled and almost exclusively agrarian. In 1815, after temporarily belonging to the Grand Duchy of Berg, the land now comprising the city of Gelsenkirchen passed to the Kingdom of Prussia, which assigned it to the province of Westphalia. Whereas the Gelsenkirchen of that time – not including today's north-end communities, such as Buer – was put in the Amt of Wattenscheid in the Bochum district, in the governmental region of Arnsberg, Buer, which was an Amt in its own right, was along with nearby Horst joined to Recklinghausen district in the governmental region of Münster. This arrangement came to an end in 1928.

After the discovery of coal – lovingly known as "Black Gold" – in the Ruhr area in 1840, and the subsequent industrialisation, the Cologne–Minden Railway and the Gelsenkirchen Main Railway Station were opened. In 1868, Gelsenkirchen became the seat of an Amt within the Bochum district which encompassed the communities of Gelsenkirchen, Braubauerschaft (since 1900, Gelsenkirchen-Bismarck), Schalke, Heßler, Bulmke and Hüllen.

Friedrich Grillo founded the Corporation for Chemical Industry (Aktiengesellschaft für Chemische Industrie) in Schalke in 1872, as well as founding Vogelsang & Co. with the Grevel family (later Schalker Eisenhütte Maschinenfabrik), and also the Schalke Mining and Ironworks Association (Schalker Gruben- und Hüttenverein). A year later, and once again in Schalke, he founded the Glass and Mirror Factory Incorporated (Glas- und Spiegel-Manufaktur AG).

After Gelsenkirchen had become an important heavy-industry hub, it was raised to city in 1875.

=== Independent city ===
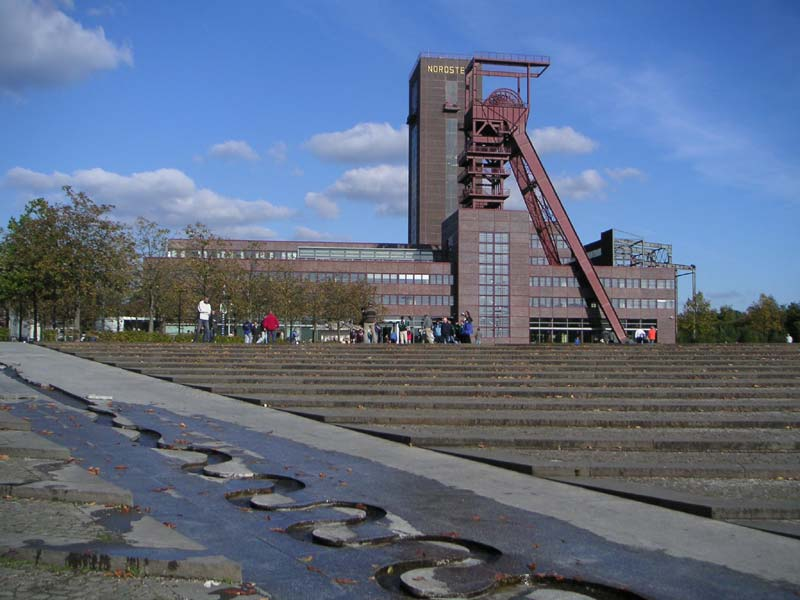
Former Nordstern Colliery

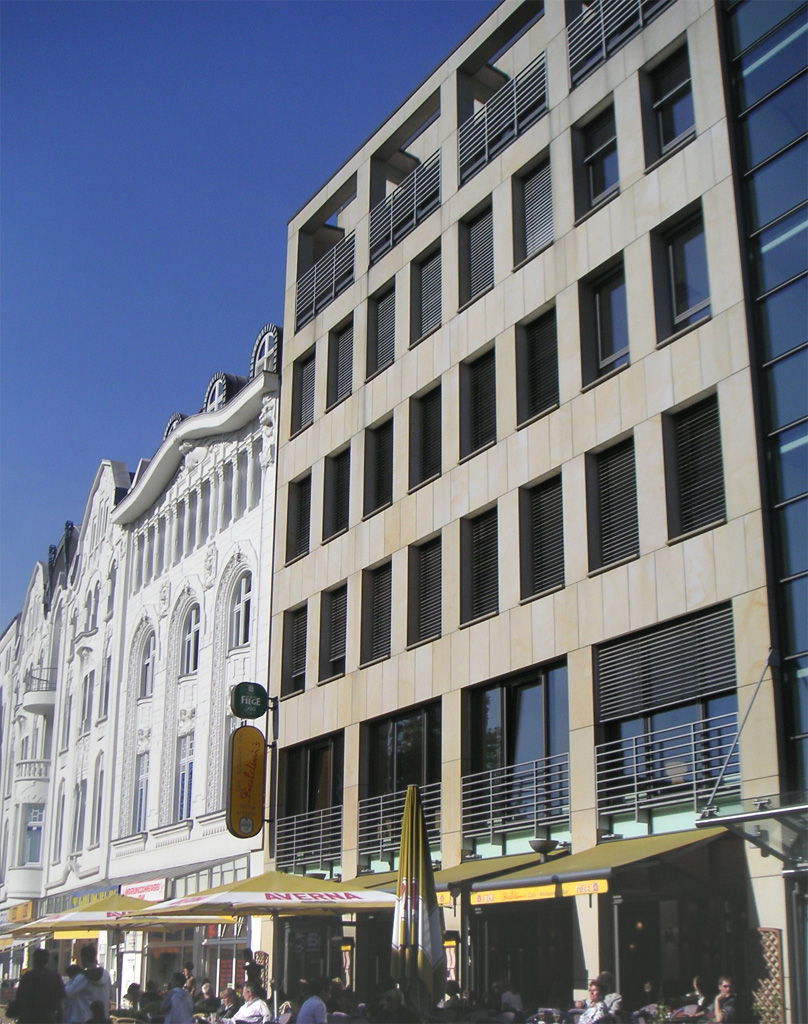
Contrasts in the inner-city

In 1885, after the Bochum district was split up, Gelsenkirchen became the seat of its own district (Kreis), which would last until 1926. The cities of Gelsenkirchen and Wattenscheid, as well as the Ämter of Braubauerschaft (in 1900, Bismarck), Schalke, Ückendorf, Wanne and Wattenscheid all belonged to the Gelsenkirchen district. A few years later, in 1896, Gelsenkirchen split off from Gelsenkirchen district to become an independent city (kreisfreie Stadt). In 1891, Horst was split off from the Amt of Buer, which itself was raised to city status in 1911, and to an independent city status the next year. Meanwhile, Horst became the seat of its own Amt. In 1924, the rural community of Rotthausen, which until then had belonged to the Essen district, was made part of the Gelsenkirchen district.

In 1928, under the Prussian local government reforms, the cities of Gelsenkirchen and Buer along with the Amt of Horst together became a new kreisfreie Stadt called Gelsenkirchen-Buer, effective on 1 April that year. From that time, the whole city area belonged to the governmental district of Münster. In 1930, on the city's advice, the city's name was changed to 'Gelsenkirchen', effective 21 May. By this time, the city was home to about 340,000 people.

In 1931, the Gelsenkirchen Mining Corporation (Gelsenkirchener Bergwerks-Aktien-Gesellschaft) founded the Gelsenberg Petrol Corporation (Gelsenberg-Benzin-AG). In 1935, the Hibernia Mining Company founded the Hydrierwerk Scholven AG GE-Buer coal liquefaction plant. Scholven/Buer began operation in 1936 and achieved a capacity of 200,000 tons/year of finished product, mainly aviation base gasoline. After 1937, Gelsenberg-Benzin-AG opened the Nordstern plant for converting bituminous coal to synthetic oil.

=== Nazi Germany ===
The 9 November 1938 Kristallnacht antisemitic riots destroyed Jewish businesses, dwellings and cemeteries, and a synagogue in Buer and one in downtown Gelsenkirchen. A new downtown Gelsenkirchen synagogue was opened on 1 February 2007.

Gelsenkirchen was a target of strategic bombing during World War II, particularly during the 1943 Battle of the Ruhr and the oil campaign. Three quarters of Gelsenkirchen was destroyed and many above-ground air raid shelters such as near the town hall in Buer are in nearly original form.

Oberst Werner Mölders, the legendary Luftwaffe fighter pilot, was born here.

The Gelsenberg Lager subcamp of the Buchenwald concentration camp was established in 1944 to provide forced labour of about 2000 Hungarian women and girls for Gelsenberg-Benzin-AG. About 150 died during September 1944 bombing raids (shelters and protection ditches were forbidden to them). There was also a camp for Sinti and Romani people (see Romani Holocaust) in the city.

From 1933 to 1945, the city's mayor was the appointed Nazi Carl Engelbert Böhmer. In 1994, the Institute for City History opened the documentation centre "Gelsenkirchen under National Socialism" (Dokumentationsstätte "Gelsenkirchen im Nationalsozialismus").

=== After the war ===
On 17 December 1953, the Kokerei Hassel went into operation, billed as Germany's "first new coking plant" since the war. The Scholven Power Station was built in the late 1960s with further development until 1985, one of the largest in Europe at the time. Its 302 metres (991 ft) chimneys are among the tallest in Germany. When postal codes were introduced in 1961, Gelsenkirchen was one of the few cities in West Germany to be given two codes: Buer was given 466, while Gelsenkirchen got 465. These were in use until 1 July 1993. The first comprehensive school in North Rhine-Westphalia was opened in 1969. Scholven-Chemie AG (the old hydrogenation plant) merged with Gelsenberg-Benzin-AG to form the new corporation VEBA-Oel AG. In 1987, Pope John Paul II celebrated Mass before 85,000 people at Gelsenkirchen's Parkstadion. The Pope also became an honorary member of FC Schalke 04.

In 1997, the Federal Garden Show (Bundesgartenschau or BUGA) was held on the grounds of the disused Nordstern coalmine in Horst. In 1999, the last phase of the Internationale Bauausstellung Emscher Park, an undertaking that brought together many cities in North Rhine-Westphalia, was held. Coke was produced at the old Hassel coking works for the last time on 29 September 1999. This marked the shutdown of the last coking plant in Gelsenkirchen, after being a coking town for more than 117 years. In the same year, Shell Solar Deutschland AG took over production of photovoltaic equipment. On 28 April 2000, the Ewald-Hugo colliery closed – Gelsenkirchen's last colliery. Three thousand coalminers lost their jobs. In 2003, Buer celebrated its thousandth anniversary of first documentary mention, and FC Schalke 04 celebrated on 4 May 2004 its hundredth anniversary.

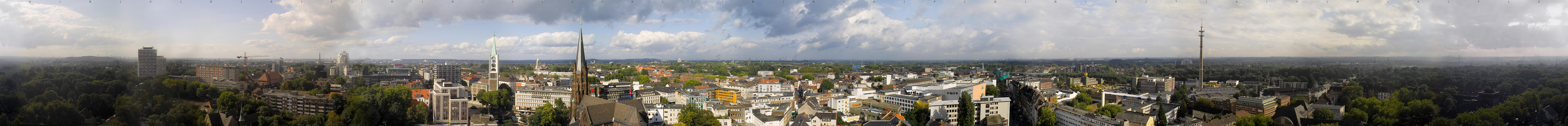
Panorama of Gelsenkirchen

=== Jewish history ===
==== 19th century ====
The Jewish community of Gelsenkirchen was officially established in 1874, relatively late compared to the Jewish Ashkenazi communities in Germany. In a list of 1829 to determine the salary for the Chief Rabbi of Westphalia, Abraham Sutro, three families were named: the families of Ruben Levi, Reuben Simon, and Herz Heimann families. With the growth of the town during the second half of the 19th century, its Jewish population also grew bigger, with about 120 Jews living in town in 1880, and a synagogue established in 1885. With the growth of the community, a bigger building was built to serve as the community school.

==== 20th century ====
The community continued to grow and around 1,100 Jews were living in Gelsenkirchen in 1901, a number that reached its peak of 1,300 individuals in 1933. At the turn of the 20th century the Reform Jewish community was the most dominant among all Jewish communities in town, and after an organ was installed inside the synagogue, and most prayers performed mostly in German instead of traditional Hebrew, the town's orthodox community decided to stop attending the synagogue and tried to establish a new orthodox community, led by Dr. Max Meyer, Dr. Rubens and Abraham Fröhlich, most of them living on Florastraße. In addition, another Jewish orthodox congregation of Polish Jews was found in town. In 1908, a lot on Wanner Straße was purchased and served the community as its cemetery until 1936, today containing about 400 graves. In addition, another cemetery was built in 1927 in the suburb of Ückendorf.

==== Nazi Germany ====
With the rise of Hitler and National Socialism in 1933, Jewish life in Gelsenkirchen was still relatively unaffected at first. In August 1938, 160 Jewish businesses were still open in town. In October 1938, though, an official ban restricted these businesses and all Jewish doctors became unemployed. In the same month, the Jewish community of the town was expelled. Between 1937 and 1939, the Jewish population of Gelsenkirchen dropped from 1,600 to 1,000. During Kristallnacht, the town's synagogue was destroyed, after two thirds of the town's Jewish population had already left. On 27 January 1942, 350 among the 500 remaining Jews in town were deported to the Riga Ghetto; later, the last remaining Jews were deported to Warsaw and the Theresienstadt concentration camp.

==== The Gelsenkirchen transport ====
On 31 March 1942, a Nazi deportation train set out from Gelsenkirchen and, carrying 48 Jews from the town area, made its way to the Warsaw Ghetto. The train was the first to deport Jews to Warsaw and not to Trawniki concentration camp in southern Poland, as used before. After it left Gelsenkirchen, the train was boarded by other Jews from Münster, Dortmund and a few other stops along the way, and mostly by the Jews of Hanover, 500 in number. The arrival of this transport from Westphalia and Upper Saxony was recorded in his diaries by Adam Czerniakov, the last chairman of the Warsaw Ghetto Judenrat. He stated that those older than 68 were allowed to stay in Germany. The majority of these deportees were killed later on the different death sites around modern-day Poland.

==== After World War II ====
In 1946, 69 Jews returned to Gelsenkirchen and in 1958, a synagogue and cultural centre were built for the remaining community. In 2005, about 450 Jews were living in town. During the last decade of the 20th century, a noted number of Jews came to the town, after emigrating out of the former USSR. This situation made it necessary to extend the synagogue. Eventually, a new and bigger synagogue was built to serve the increasing Jewish community of Gelsenkirchen. The current community practices Orthodox Judaism, even though no family practices it at home. On 16 May 2014, antisemitic graffiti were painted on the town synagogue.

==== Sites ====
The building at Husemannstraße 75 belonged to Dr. Max Meyer, who built it between 1920 and 1921. A mezuzah sign can still be seen on the top right side of the door. On Florastraße, near Kennedyplatz, (formerly Schalker Straße 45), stands the house of the Tepper family, a Jewish family that vanished during the Holocaust. As part of the national Stolperstein project, five bricks, commemorating the Jewish inhabitants, were installed outside the house.

== Climate ==
Climate data for Station Bochum, Gelsenkirchen (2019–2024)
Month	Jan	Feb	Mar	Apr	May	Jun	Jul	Aug	Sep	Oct	Nov	Dec	Year
Record high °C (°F)	16.6 (61.9)	16.2 (61.2)	19.3 (66.7)	26.6 (79.9)	27.8 (82.0)	31.1 (88.0)	35 (95)	29.1 (84.4)	30.5 (86.9)	25.1 (77.2)	18.2 (64.8)	17.4 (63.3)	35 (95)
Mean maximum °C (°F)	6.6 (43.9)	9.9 (49.8)	12 (54)	14.6 (58.3)	20.5 (68.9)	25.7 (78.3)	23.9 (75.0)	23.2 (73.8)	24.3 (75.7)	17.2 (63.0)	11.1 (52.0)	7.2 (45.0)	25.7 (78.3)
Daily mean °C (°F)	4.4 (39.9)	7.0 (44.6)	8.3 (46.9)	10.1 (50.2)	15.1 (59.2)	20.3 (68.5)	18.9 (66.0)	18.2 (64.8)	18.9 (66.0)	13.5 (56.3)	8.3 (46.9)	5.2 (41.4)	12.4 (54.2)
Mean minimum °C (°F)	2.1 (35.8)	4.3 (39.7)	5 (41)	6 (43)	10.2 (50.4)	14.3 (57.7)	14.6 (58.3)	14.4 (57.9)	13.9 (57.0)	10.6 (51.1)	5.6 (42.1)	3.1 (37.6)	2.1 (35.8)
Record low °C (°F)	−7.9 (17.8)	−3 (27)	−3.6 (25.5)	−1.4 (29.5)	3 (37)	8.5 (47.3)	10.6 (51.1)	10.5 (50.9)	9.5 (49.1)	3.7 (38.7)	−3.4 (25.9)	−7.5 (18.5)	−7.9 (17.8)
Average precipitation mm (inches)	89 (3.5)	82 (3.2)	98 (3.9)	88 (3.5)	96 (3.8)	47 (1.9)	144 (5.7)	155 (6.1)	59 (2.3)	121 (4.8)	84 (3.3)	135 (5.3)	1,198 (47.3)
Average rainy days	21	19	19	19	14	7	22	19	12	20	22	22	216
Source: Deutscher Wetterdienst

== Demographics ==
Population development since 1800 (for borders at a given year)

Historical population

Year	Pop.	±% p.a.
1871	23,794	—
1885	69,863	+8.00%
1895	125,307	+6.02%
1905	219,501	+5.77%
1925	330,186	+2.06%
1933	332,545	+0.09%
1939	317,568	−0.77%
1946	265,793	−2.51%
1950	315,460	+4.38%
1961	382,689	+1.77%
1965	371,405	−0.75%
1970	347,074	−1.35%

Year	Pop.	±% p.a.
1975	322,587	−1.45%
1980	304,401	−1.15%
1985	285,014	−1.31%
1990	293,714	+0.60%
1995	291,164	−0.17%
2000	278,695	−0.87%
2005	268,102	−0.77%
2010	257,981	−0.77%
2015	260,368	+0.18%
2020	259,105	−0.10%
2025	266,199	+0.54%

Source: Destatis (1871-1961) and Landesdatabank Nordrhein-Westfalen (1965-2025)

== Politics ==
=== Mayor ===
Results of the second round of the 2025 mayoral election

The current mayor of Gelsenkirchen is Andrea Henze of the Social Democratic Party (SPD) since 2025. The most recent mayoral election was held on 14 September 2025, with a run-off held on 28 September, and the results were as follows:

Candidate	Party	First round		Second round	
Candidate	Party	Votes	%	Votes	%
Andrea Henze	Social Democratic Party	33,741	37.0	53,652	66.9
Norbert Emmerich	Alternative for Germany	27,100	29.8	26,511	33.1
Laura Rosen	Christian Democratic Union	17,385	19.1		
Martin Gatzemeier	The Left	3,368	3.7		
Susanne Cichos	Free Democratic Party	3,229	3.5		
Sinan Böcek	Voter Initiative NRW	2,314	2.5		
Cornelia Keisel	Human Environment Animal Protection	1,953	2.1		
Sascha Maierhofer	Die PARTEI	770	0.9		
Jan Specht	Alternative, Independent, Progressive Gelsenkirchen (AUF)	671	0.7		
Claudia Kapuschinski	Independent	559	0.6		
Valid votes		91,090	99.1	80,163	99.4
Invalid votes		790	0.9	517	0.6
Total		91,880	100.0	80,680	100.0
Electorate/voter turnout		185,093	49.6	184,982	43.6
Source: City of Gelsenkirchen (1st round, 2nd round)

=== City council ===
Results of the 2025 city council election

The Gelsenkirch city council governs the city alongside the mayor. The most recent city council election was held on 14 September 2025, and the results were as follows:

Party	Votes	%	+/-	Seats	+/-
Social Democratic Party (SPD)	27.677	30.4	▼4.7	20	▼11
Alternative for Germany (AfD)	27,271	29.9	▲17.1	20	▲9
Christian Democratic Union (CDU)	17,467	19.2	▼4.1	12	▼8
Alliance 90/The Greens (Grüne)	4,221	4.6	▼7.6	3	▼8
The Left (Die Linke)	3,948	4.3	▼0.9	3	Steady
Free Democratic Party (FDP)	2,444	2.7	▼1.4	2	▼2
Voter Initiative NRW (WIN)	2.082	2.3	▼1.4	1	▼2
Human Environment Animal Protection (Tierschutz)	2,024	2.2	New	1	New
Sahra Wagenknecht Alliance (BSW)	1,428	1.6	New	1	New
Gelsenkirchener Union für Teilhabe (GUT)	1,091	1.2	New	1	New
Alternative, Independent, Progressive Gelsenkirchen (AUF)	776	0.9	▼0.4	1	Steady
Die PARTEI (PARTEI)	728	0.8	▼1.2	1	▼1
Valid votes	91,157	99.2			
Invalid votes	696	0.8			
Total	91,853	100.0		66	▼22
Electorate/voter turnout	185,093	49.6	▲8.1		
Source: City of Gelsenkirchen

== Economy and infrastructure ==
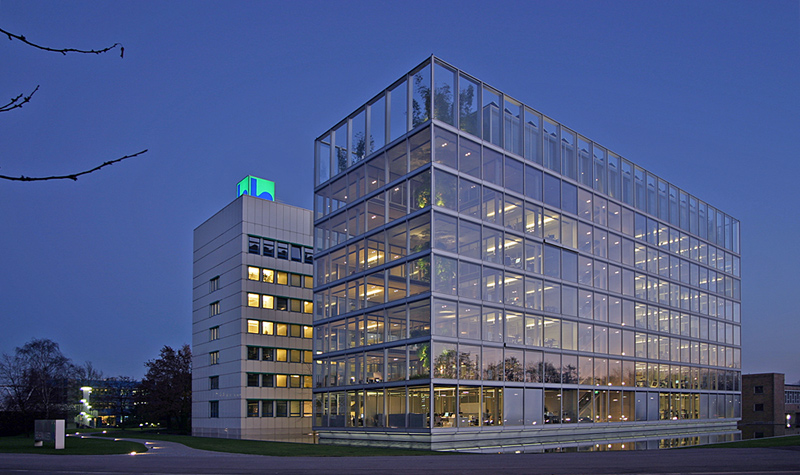
Headquarters of the Gelsenwasser AG

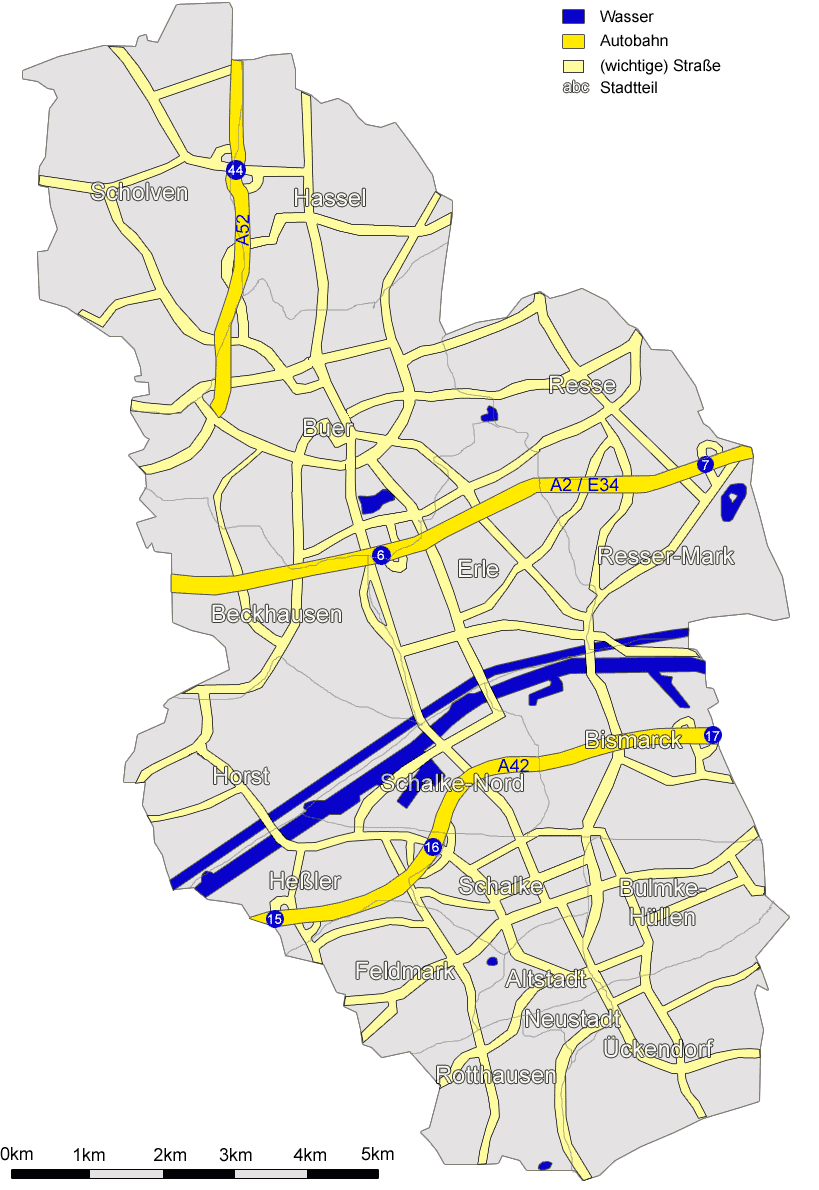
Highways and main roads in Gelsenkirchen

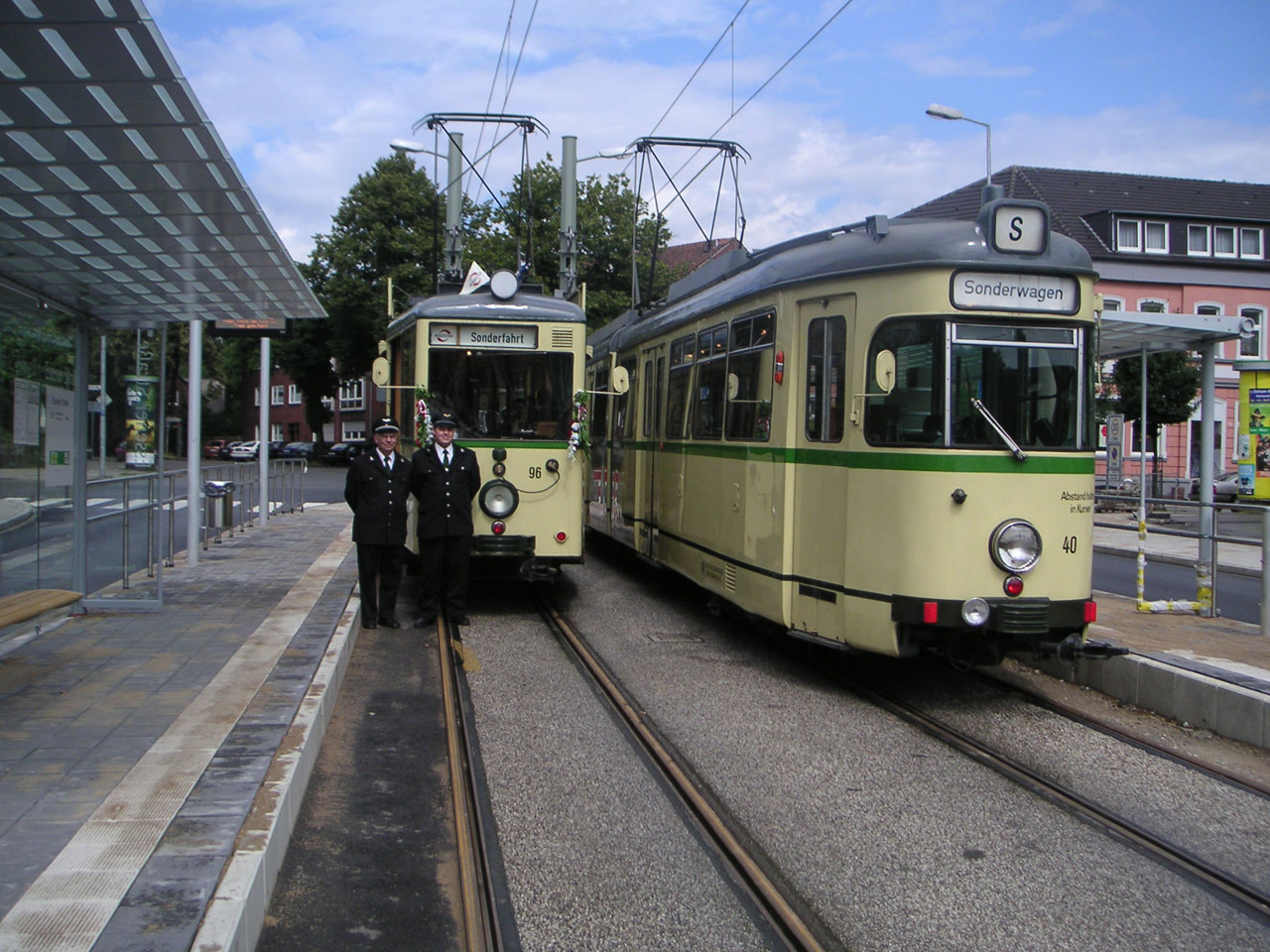
Two vintage trams on hand for the reopening of the Essener Straße stop in Horst

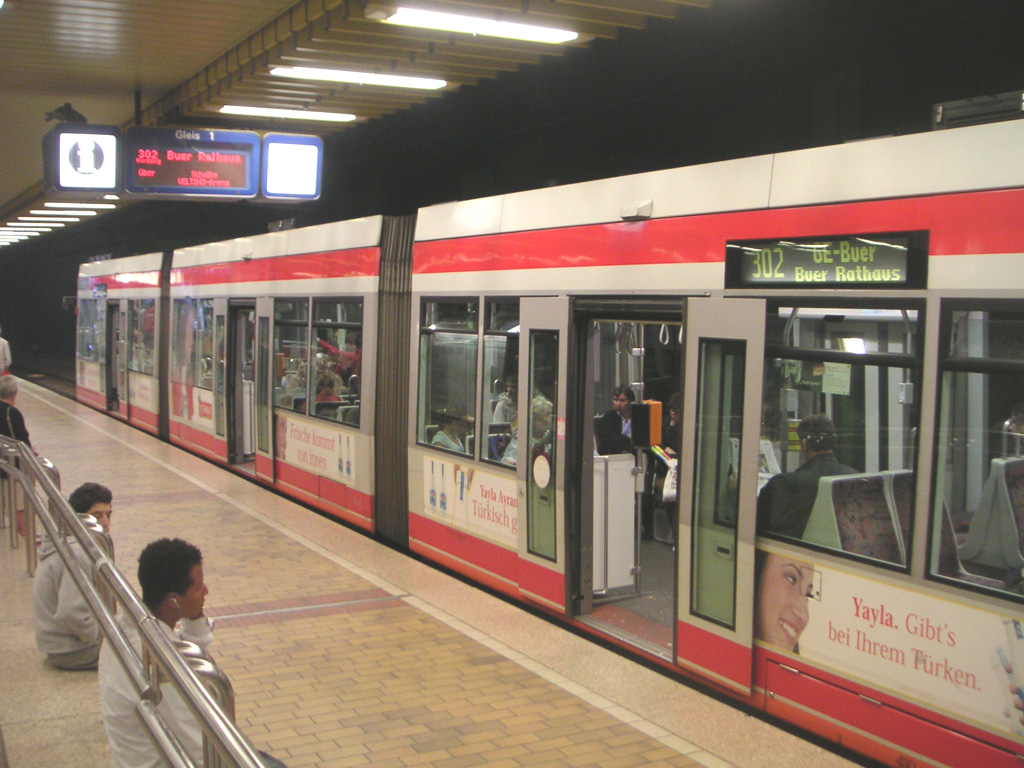
Stadtbahn at main railway station

Gelsenkirchen is the poorest city in Germany; it has the highest rate of unemployment, 15%, in the country and the highest percentage of residents on welfare. In a 2018 study about quality of life in Germany, Gelsenkirchen was placed last, 401st, of all German cities.

Shell Solar Deutschland GmbH produces solar cells in Rotthausen. Scheuten Solar Technology has taken over its solar panel production. Other businesses include THS Wohnen, Gelsenwasser, e.on, BP Gelsenkirchen GmbH, Shell Solar Deutschland GmbH and Pilkington. ZOOM Erlebniswelt Gelsenkirchen is a zoo founded in 1949 as "Ruhr-Zoo" now operated by the city.

== Transport ==
Gelsenkirchen lies on autobahns A 2, A 40, A 42 and A 52, as well as on Bundesstraßen (Federal Highways) B 224, B 226 and B 227. Gelsenkirchen Hauptbahnhof (central station) lies at the junction of the Duisburg–Dortmund, the Essen–Gelsenkirchen and the Gelsenkirchen–Münster lines.

The Rhine–Herne Canal has a commercial-industrial harbour in Gelsenkirchen. Gelsenkirchen Harbour has a yearly turnover of 2 million tonnes and a water surface area of about 1.2 square kilometres (0.5 square miles), one of Germany's biggest and most important canal harbours, and is furthermore connected to Deutsche Bahn's railway network at Gelsenkirchen Hauptbahnhof.

Local transport in Gelsenkirchen is provided by the Bochum/Gelsenkirchen tramway network and buses run by the Bochum-Gelsenkirchener Straßenbahn AG (BOGESTRA), as well as by buses operated by Vestische Straßenbahnen GmbH in the city's north (despite its name, it nowadays runs only buses). Some Stadtbahn and tram lines are operated by Ruhrbahn. All these services have an integrated fare structure within the VRR. There are three tram lines, one light rail line, and about 50 bus routes in Gelsenkirchen.

The city is served by Düsseldorf Airport, located 40 km (25 mi) south west, and Dortmund Airport, located 45 km (28 mi) east of Gelsenkirchen.

== Education and science ==
Gelsenkirchen has 51 elementary schools (36 public schools, 12 Catholic schools, 3 Protestant schools), 8 Hauptschulen, 6 Realschulen, 7 Gymnasien, and 5 Gesamtschulen, among which the Gesamtschule Bismarck, as the only comprehensive school run by the Westphalian branch of the Evangelical (Lutheran) Church, warrants special mention.

The Fachhochschule Gelsenkirchen, founded in 1992, also has campuses in Bocholt and Recklinghausen. It offers courses in economics, computer science, engineering physics, electrical engineering, mechanical engineering, and supply and disposal engineering.

There is a Volkshochschule for adult education as well as a city library with three branches.

The Institute for Underground Infrastructure, founded in 1994 and associated with the Ruhr University Bochum, provides a wide range of research, certification, and consulting services. The science park created in 1995 by Internationale Bauausstellung Emscher Park, Wissenschaftspark Gelsenkirchen, provides a pathway to restructure the local economy from coal- and steel-based industries to solar energy and project management.

== Culture ==
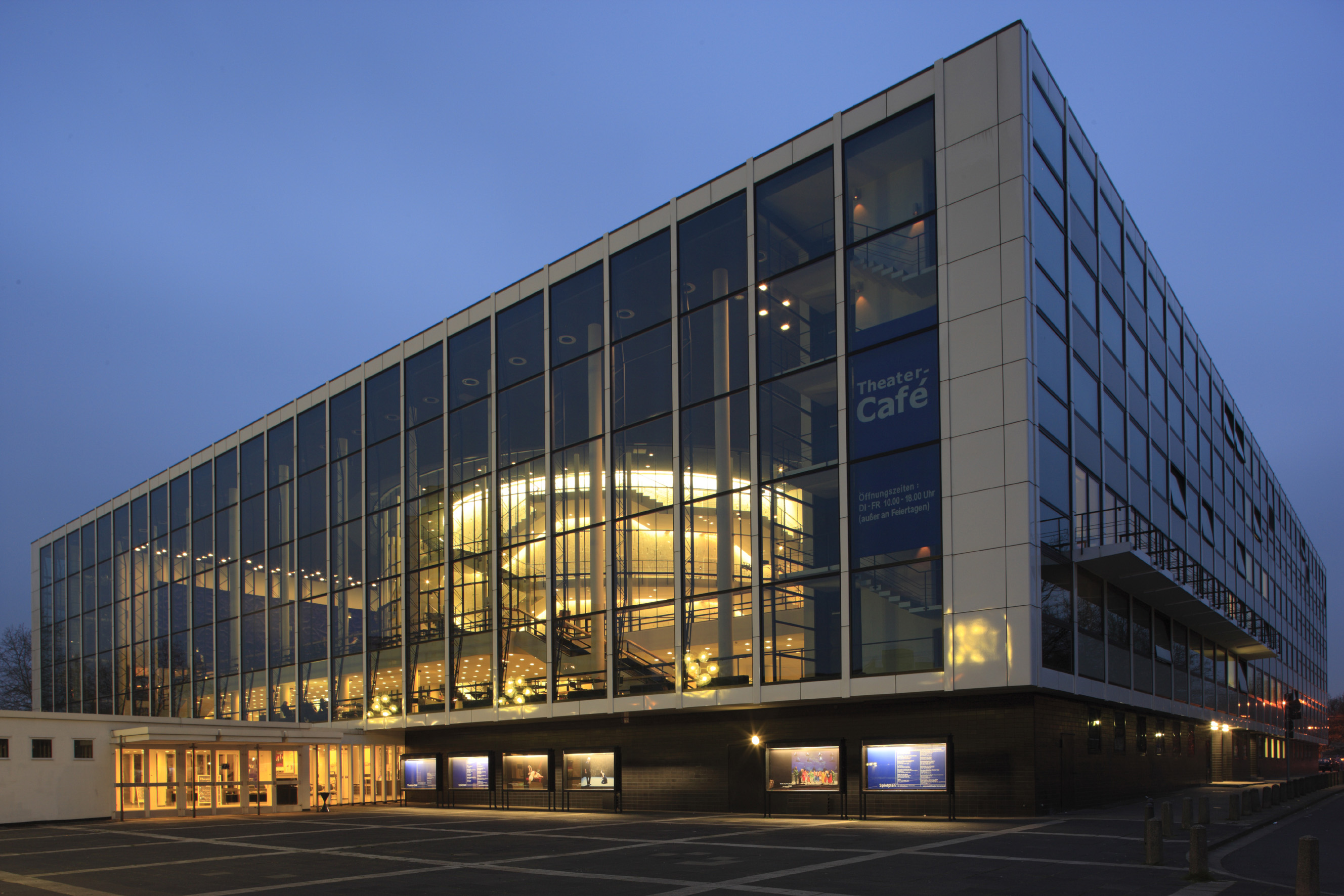
Musiktheater im Revier

- Musiktheater im Revier
- Hans-Sachs-Haus
- Kunstmuseum Gelsenkirchen
- Architecture (Brick Expressionism), heritage listings
- ZOOM Erlebniswelt Gelsenkirchen/Ruhr-Zoo
- Industrial Heritage Trail (Route der Industriekultur)
- Nordsternpark
- Ruhr.2010 – European Capital of Culture
- Rock Hard Festival
- Filming of The Miracle of Father Malachia
- Emscherkunst, a major exhibition for contemporary art in the public space of the Emscher region, with several installations located within Gelsenkirchen's industrial landscape.
- Wissenschaftspark Gelsenkirchen [Science Park Gelsenkirchen], a distinctive glass-arch building that serves as a hub for technology and innovation, occasionally hosting cultural events and standing as an example of modern regional architecture.

=== Media ===
Gelsenkirchen is the headquarters of the Verband Lokaler Rundfunk in Nordrhein-Westfalen e.V. (VLR) (Network of Local Radio in North Rhine-Westphalia Registered Association). REL (Radio Emscher-Lippe) is also headquartered in Gelsenkirchen.

Among newspapers, the Buersche Zeitung was a daily till 2006. The Ruhr Nachrichten ceased publication in Gelsenkirchen in April 2006. Now, the Westdeutsche Allgemeine Zeitung is the only local newspaper in Gelsenkirchen. The local station Radio Emscher-Lippe also reports the local news.

There is also a free weekly newspaper, the Stadtspiegel Gelsenkirchen, along with monthly, or irregular, local publications called the Familienpost and the Beckhausener Kurier.

== Sport ==
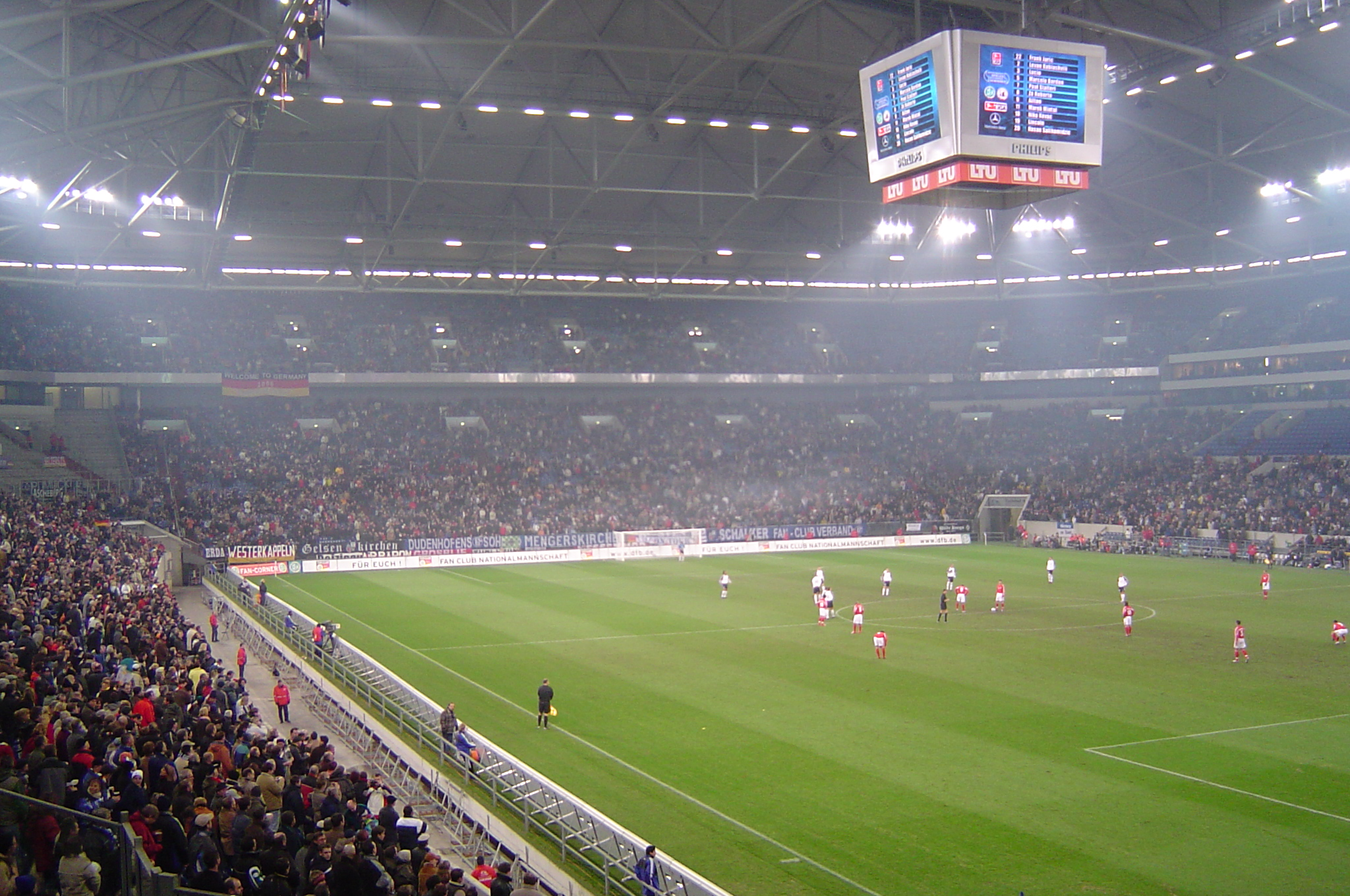
Arena AufSchalke, the stadium of Bundesliga club FC Schalke 04

Gelsenkirchen is home of the football club FC Schalke 04, currently in the Bundesliga, the first tier of German football. The club has won 7 German titles, all of them before the founding of the Bundesliga. Schalke's home ground is Arena AufSchalke. It was one of 12 German cities to host matches during the 2006 FIFA World Cup, hosting matches between Poland and Ecuador, Argentina and Serbia and Montenegro, Portugal and Mexico, and USA and Czech Republic. It is also host to four matches during the 2024 European Championships.

German football players İlkay Gündoğan, Mesut Özil, Olaf Thon and Manuel Neuer were born in Gelsenkirchen. German football manager Michael Skibbe and Turkish footballer Hamit Altintop were also born here.

Since 1912, Gelsenkirchen owns the harness racing track Trabrennbahn Gelsenkirchen (also referred as GelsenTrabPark).

== Notable people ==
- Alfons Goldschmidt (1879–1940), journalist, economist, university lecturer
- Claire Waldoff (1884–1957), kabarett singer in Berlin
- Wilhelm Zaisser (1893–1958), communist politician, first Minister for State Security of East Germany
- Hans Krahe (1898–1965), philologist, linguist
- Anton Stankowski (1906–1998), graphic designer, photographer, painter
- Werner Mölders (1913–1941), officer of the Luftwaffe
- Klaus Wolfgang Niemöller (1929-2024), musicologist
- Harald zur Hausen (1936-2023), virologist, Nobel laureate (2008), 1983–2003 chief scientific officer of German Cancer Research Center in Heidelberg
- Heinrich Breloer (born 1942), film director
- Gerd Faltings (born 1954), mathematician, Fields medalist (1986)
- Ralf Reski (born 1958), plant biotechnologist
- Susanne Neumann (1959–2019), author, activist
- Tom Angelripper (born 1963), singer and bassist of the thrash metal band Sodom
- Oliver Mark (born 1963), photographer
- Gregor Hagedorn (born 1965), botanist
- Sebastian Lang-Lessing (born 1966), orchestra and opera conductor
- Anne Schwanewilms (born 1967), opera soprano
- Katrin Becker (born 1967), theoretical physicist
- Kai Twilfer (born 1976), author and businessman
- Terry Reintke (born 1987), politician and Member of the European Parliament (MEP) for the Greens-EFA group

=== Sport ===
- Ernst Kuzorra (1905–1990), footballer and manager, 12 caps and 7 goals for Germany, 6x German Champion, 450 appearances and 419 goals for Schalke, part of their 'Team of the Century'
- Fritz Szepan (1907–1974), footballer with 34 caps and 8 goals for Germany, 6x German Champion, 434 appearances and 309 goals for Schalke, part of their 'Team of the Century'
- Manfred Kreuz (1936–2026), footballer with 218 appearances and 59 goals for Schalke, 1x German Champion
- Norbert Nigbur (born 1948), footballer with 6 caps for West Germany, 1974 World Cup winner, 440 appearances for Schalke, part of their 'Team of the Century'
- Michael Skibbe (born 1965), former football player and current coach
- Olaf Thon (born 1966), footballer and manager, 52 caps for Germany, 1990 World Cup winner, 3x Bundesliga Winner, 383 appearances for Schalke, part of their 'Team of the Century'
- Hamit Altıntop (born 1982), footballer with 82 caps and 7 goals for Turkey, league winner in Germany, Spain and Turkey
- Manuel Neuer (born 1986), footballer with 126 caps for Germany, 2014 World Cup winner, 13x Bundesliga Winner, 2x Champions League Winner and 5x World's Best Goalkeeper
- Mesut Özil (born 1988), footballer with 92 caps and 23 goals for Germany, 2014 World Cup winner and La Liga winner
- İlkay Gündoğan (born 1990), footballer with 66 caps and 17 goals for Germany, league winner in Germany and England

== International relations ==
=== Twin towns – sister cities ===
Gelsenkirchen is twinned with:

- Zenica, Bosnia and Herzegovina (1969)
- Shakhty, Russia (1989)
- Olsztyn, Poland (1992)
- Cottbus, Germany (1995)
- Büyükçekmece, Turkey (2004)
- Newcastle upon Tyne, United Kingdom (1948)

== See also ==
- Horst Castle
