= The Zodiac Sessions =

Compilation album by Orchid
- Released: 18 November 2013
- Recorded: 2009, 2011
- Genre: Doom metal
- Length: 73:00
- Label: Nuclear Blast

Orchid chronology
The Mouths of Madness (2013)	The Zodiac Sessions (2013)

Professional ratings
Review scores
Source	Rating
Classic Rock	7/10 stars

The Zodiac Sessions is the first compilation album by American doom metal band Orchid. It compiles remastered versions of both releases on their first record label, the Church Within: their first studio album, Capricorn, and their debut EP, Through the Devil's Doorway. The album was released on 18 November 2013 as a limited edition digipak, with new cover art by singer Theo Mindell.

To accompany the release of The Zodiac Sessions, vinyl versions of Through the Devil's Doorway and Capricorn were separately released.

== Track listing ==
Capricorn
No.	Title	Length
1.	"Eyes Behind the Wall"	7:13
2.	"Capricorn"	4:40
3.	"Black Funeral"	6:28
4.	"Masters of It All"	6:37
5.	"Down into the Earth"	6:24
6.	"He Who Walks Alone"	6:49
7.	"Cosmonaut of Three"	5:44
8.	"Electric Father"	7:19
9.	"Albatross"	5:54

Through the Devil's Doorway
No.	Title	Length
10.	"Into the Sun"	3:25
11.	"Eastern Woman"	4:21
12.	"Son of Misery"	2:13
13.	"No One Makes a Sound"	5:56

== Personnel ==
- Theo Mindell – vocals
- Mark Thomas Baker – guitar
- Keith Nickel – bass guitar
- Carter Kennedy – drums
