= Kai Twilfer =

German author

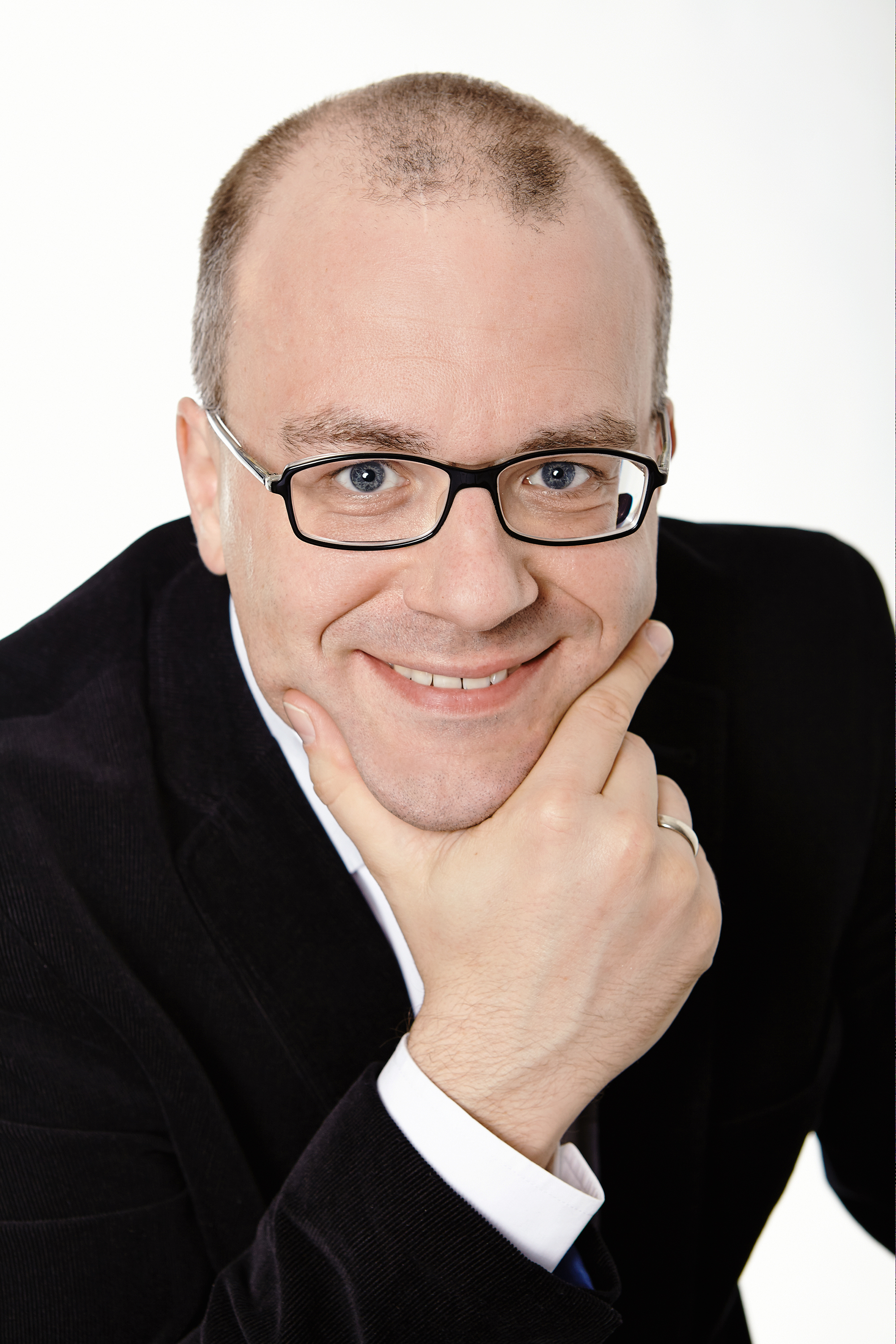
Kai Twilfer

Kai Henrik Twilfer (born 1976, Gelsenkirchen, West Germany) is a German merchant and author.

== Early life ==
Kai Twilfer studied economics in Bochum. While a student, he founded a production company for advertising movies. Apart from that, he worked at Westdeutscher Rundfunk in Cologne. In 2002 he founded a wholesale company for regional gift merchandise from the Ruhr region. He is the managing director of the Industriekult-Verlags GmbH.

== Career ==
In February 2013, he published his first book entitled Schantall, tu ma die Omma winken! (Schantall, go ahead and wave at Grandma) through Schwarzkopf & Schwarzkopf, which became a bestseller. In this book, using satire, he describes the experiences of a social worker named Jochen (given name), concerning the fictitious lower-class family "Pröllmann". His attempts to establish education fail spectacularly. The book was an online book report number one seller during 2013.

== Publications ==
- Together with Susanne Granas (Illustrator): Schantall, tu ma die Omma winken! Aus dem Alltag eines unerschrockenen Sozialarbeiters. Schwarzkopf & Schwarzkopf, Berlin 2013, ISBN 978-3-86265-219-8. Translated title: “Schantall, go ahead and wave at Grandma! From the everyday life of a fearless social worker“
- 111 Gründe, den Ruhrpott zu lieben. Eine Liebeserklärung an die großartigste Region der Welt. Schwarzkopf & Schwarzkopf, Berlin 2013, ISBN 978-3-89602-973-7. Translated title: “111 Reasons to love the Ruhr region. A declaration of love for the greatest region in the world”
- Schantall, tu ma die Omma Prost sagen! Neues aus dem Alltag des unerschrockenen Sozialarbeiters. Schwarzkopf & Schwarzkopf, Berlin 2014, ISBN 978-3-86265-382-9. Translated title: “Schantall, go ahead and tell Grandma Cheers! The latest news from the everyday life of a fearless social worker”
  - As an audio book: Schantall, tu ma die Omma Prost sagen! Neues aus dem Alltag des unerschrockenen Sozialarbeiters. Schwarzkopf & Schwarzkopf, Berlin 2014, ISBN 978-3-86265-383-6.
- Schantall, tu ma die Omma Tschüss rufen! Unglaubliches aus dem Alltag des unerschrockenen Sozialarbeiters. Schwarzkopf & Schwarzkopf, Berlin 2016, ISBN 978-3-86265-570-0. Translated title: “Schantall, go ahead and wave Grandma good-bye! Unbelievable information from the everyday life of a fearless social worker”
- Finn-Luca, komm bei Fuß! Der verrückte Familienhorror von nebenan. Fischer Taschenbuch, Frankfurt am Main 2016, ISBN 978-3-596-03217-4. Translated title: “Finn-Luca, heel! The crazy family-horror next door”.
- Ich hab keine Macken! Das sind Special Effects. Bastei Lübbe, Köln 2017, ISBN 978-3-404-60957-4. Translated title: “I don’t have any faults! These are special effects”.

== See also ==
- German Kevinism
