= Gelsenberg Lager =

Coordinates: 51°32′24″N 7°3′4″E

The Gelsenberg Lager was a subcamp of the concentration camp Buchenwald in Gelsenkirchen-Horst.

About 2000 Hungarian Jewish women were held in this subcamp, and were given the task of clearing the area of the Gelsenberg Benzin AG of rubble in the summer 1944.

Approximately 150 of them were killed during heavy bombing attacks on the hydrogenation plant in September 1944. A few badly injured survivors were taken to Gelsenkirchen hospitals.

After the dissolution of the camp in the middle of September 1944, the remaining Hungarian Jewish women in the camp were sent to the subcamp Soemmerda in Thuringia and the other women were shifted to Essen into another subcamp of the KZ Buchenwald

The Gelsenzentrum, a center for urban and contemporary history in Gelsenkirchen, contains documents concerning the history of the subcamp Gelsenberglager.
