= The Mouths of Madness =

Studio album by Orchid
- Released: April 26, 2013
- Studio: Hyde St. Studios in San Francisco, California; Laughing Tiger Studios in San Rafael, California; Capricorn Studios in Novato, California
- Genre: Doom metal
- Length: 56:01
- Label: Nuclear Blast
- Producer: Theo Mindell, Will Storkson

Orchid chronology
Wizard of War (EP) (2013)	The Mouths of Madness (2013)	The Zodiac Sessions (2013)

Professional ratings
Review scores
Source	Rating
MetalSucks	3.5/5 stars

The Mouths of Madness is the second studio album by American doom metal band Orchid.

== Tour ==
To promote the album, Orchid went on a headlining tour with Blues Pills and Scorpion Child.

== Track listing ==
No.	Title	Length
1.	"Mouths of Madness"	5:50
2.	"Marching Dogs of War"	5:29
3.	"Silent One"	7:25
4.	"Nomad"	6:21
5.	"Mountains of Steel"	6:57
6.	"Leaving It All Behind"	7:20
7.	"The Loving Hand of God"	6:10
8.	"Wizard of War"	3:19
9.	"See You on the Other Side"	7:16

== Personnel ==
Orchid

- Theo Mindell – vocals, synthesizer, percussion
- Mark Thomas Baker – guitars
- Keith Nickel – bass guitar
- Carter Kennedy – drums

Additional musicians

- Will Storkson – keyboards, synthesizer, percussion
