= At the Mountains of Madness (disambiguation) =

At the Mountains of Madness is a novella by H.P. Lovecraft.

At the Mountains of Madness or Mountain of Madness may also refer to:

== Music ==
- "At the Mountains of Madness", a 1968 song by the psychedelic rock group H. P. Lovecraft from H. P. Lovecraft II
- At the Mountains of Madness (Blackfeather album), 1971
- At the Mountains of Madness (EP), a 1997 EP by Orphanage
- At the Mountains of Madness (Electric Masada album), 2005

== Other uses ==
- At the Mountains of Madness and Other Novels, a collection of Lovecraft's work
- Dark Adventure Radio Theatre: At the Mountains of Madness, a 2006 radio performance of Lovecraft's At the Mountains of Madness
- Mountain of Madness, an episode of The Simpsons
- The Mountains of Madness, an audio/visual musical adaptation of the works of H.P. Lovecraft

== See also ==
- In the Mouth of Madness (disambiguation)
