= Orchid (heavy metal band) =

American doom metal band

- Origin: San Francisco, California, U.S.
- Genres: Doom metal, occult rock
- Years active: 2007–present
- Labels: Nuclear Blast, The Church Within
- Members: Theo Mindell; Mark Thomas Baker; Keith Nickel; Tommy Rickard
- Past members: Carter Kennedy; Ted "TJ" Cox
- Website: orchidsf.com

Orchid is an American doom metal band founded in San Francisco, California in 2007. The band consists of Theo Mindell (vocals, synthesizer, percussion), Mark Thomas Baker (guitar), Keith Nickel (bass guitar) and Tommy Rickard (drums). They are named after the Black Sabbath song of the same name.

== History ==
Orchid formed in 2007 with a lineup of Mindell, Baker, Nickel and drummer Carter Kennedy. The group released their first EP, Through the Devil's Doorway, in 2009. It was followed by their debut studio album, Capricorn, released in 2011. Both of those initial releases on the Church Within label were later reissued together on the Nuclear Blast compilation album The Zodiac Sessions in 2013.

Orchid's second studio album, The Mouths of Madness, was released via Nuclear Blast in 2013. In November of that year, the band embarked on a European tour, alongside Scorpion Child and Blues Pills.

The band's next EP, Sign of the Witch, was released by Nuclear Blast on July 17, 2015.

On April 21, 2016, Orchid announced that Kennedy had left the band the previous July, that Ted "TJ" Cox had joined as their new drummer that August, and that they were writing and demoing new material for a third full-length album due out in 2017. Later in 2016, Tommy Rickard joined as the band's new drummer replacing Cox.

== Musical style ==
Rooted in blues rock and heavy metal, Orchid are highly praised by rock critics for their dark, riff-based doom metal sound, influenced by pioneering metal band Black Sabbath. British heavy metal magazine Metal Hammer said of the band, "Thought Sabbath had already written all the best riffs? Think again – these guys have some monsters". They have also been described as occult rock.

Orchid also draw inspiration from other '70s rock bands such as Led Zeppelin and Pink Floyd.

== Band members ==
=== Current ===
- Theo Mindell – vocals, synthesizer, percussion (2007–present)
- Mark Thomas Baker – guitars (2007–present)
- Keith Nickel – bass (2007–present)
- Tommy Rickard – drums (2016–present)

=== Former ===
- Carter Kennedy – drums (2007–2015)
- Ted "TJ" Cox – drums (2015–2016)

== Discography ==
=== Studio albums ===
- Capricorn (2011, The Church Within Records)
- The Mouths of Madness (2013, Nuclear Blast)

=== EPs ===
- Through the Devil's Doorway (2009, The Church Within)
- Heretic (2012, Nuclear Blast)
- Wizard of War (2013, Nuclear Blast)
- Sign of the Witch (2015, Nuclear Blast)

=== Compilation albums ===
- The Zodiac Sessions (2013, Nuclear Blast)

=== Singles ===
- "Heretic" (2012, Nuclear Blast)
