= Scorpion Child =

American rock band

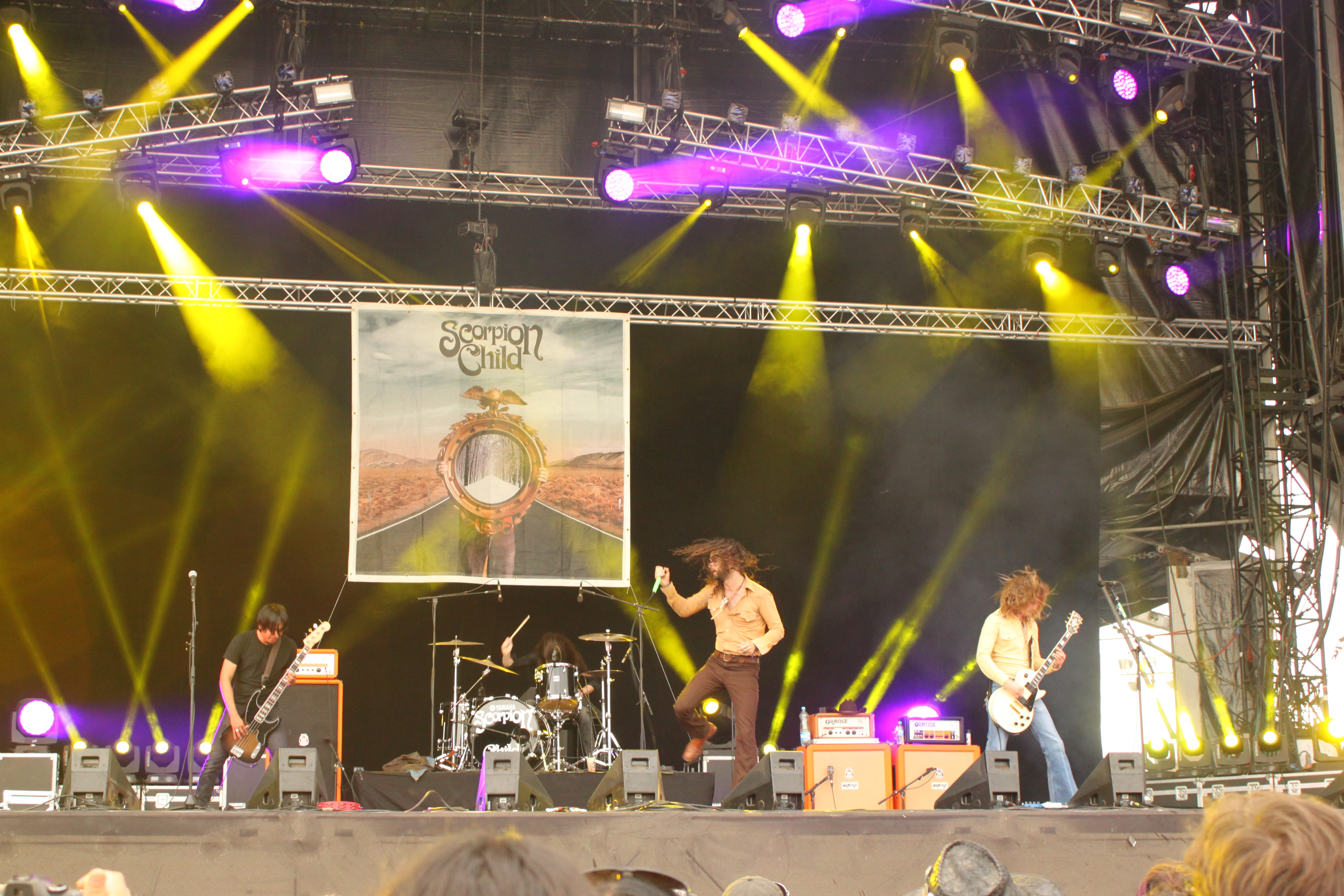
- Scorpion Child at Hellfest 2014.

Background information
- Origin: Austin, Texas, U.S.
- Genres: Hard rock, psychedelic rock, blues rock, heavy metal
- Years active: 2006–present
- Label: N/A
- Members: Aryn Jonathan Black; Asa Savage; Ryan Henderson; Garth D. Condit; Adrian Arostone
- Past members: Shawn Alvear; Shaun Avants; Chris Cowart; Jeremy Cruz; Tom Frank; Chris Hodge; Alec Padron; Jon Rice; Erick Sanger; AJ Vincent; Jonas Wikstrand

Scorpion Child is an American rock band from Austin, Texas, active sporadically since 2006. Singer Aryn Jonathan Black has been the group's only consistent member. Their music has been compared to Led Zeppelin, Uriah Heep, Rainbow, and Black Sabbath, and the band has cited Pentagram, Lucifer's Friend, The Sisters of Mercy, and Bauhaus as influences.

== History ==
Scorpion Child was formed in 2006 as an acoustic duo, consisting of Aryn Jonathan Black and guitarist Asa Savage. The band's name came from a song by the English rock band The Cult. They signed with the Nuclear Blast label and worked with Grammy-nominated producer Chris “Frenchie” Smith on their first two albums.

Savage departed in 2010 and Black expanded the lineup. Scorpion Child released their self-titled debut album in June 2013, featuring a lineup of Black, lead guitarist Chris Cowart, rhythm guitarist Tom Frank, bassist Shaun Avants, and drummer Shawn Alvear; with contributions from previous guitarist Chris Hodge. One reviewer described Scorpion Child as "a heavy-riffing behemoth that takes the current glut of guitar-slinging retro-copyists and punches them through the pavement." The album reached #31 on the Billboard Heatseekers chart. The song "Polygon of Eyes" was featured as the iTunes single of the week in June 2013.

Frank, Avants, and Alvear all left the band in 2014. Jon “The Charn” Rice, previously of the death metal band Job for a Cowboy, joined on drums and Alec Padron joined on bass. Instead of recruiting a new rhythm guitarist, the band added keyboardist AJ Vincent in early 2015. This lineup released the album Acid Roulette in June 2016. The album was noted for being heavier and more progressive than its predecessor, thanks to the strengths of the new lineup, while one reviewer noted the album's "Lizzy-meets-Maiden riffage." Acid Roulette reached #19 on the Billboard Heatseekers chart.

Scorpion Child went on hiatus in mid-2017. Drummer Jon Rice left the band and joined Uncle Acid & the Deadbeats. Bassist Alec Padron and keyboardist AJ Vincent also departed during this period. In late 2018, Black and Cowart reformed the band with former guitarist Asa Savage and former drummer Shawn Alvear, plus new bassist Garth D. Condit. This lineup partially completed a new album. In February 2020, the band announced on social media that they had broken up the previous year. In 2021 the band reformed yet again with Black, Savage, and Condit joined by new members Adrian Arostone on guitar and Jonas Wikstrand on drums (formerly of Swedish band Enforcer). The drummer position was then filled by Ryan Henderson. Their third album I Saw the End As It Passed Right Through Me, which adds influences from dark wave and post punk to the band's hard rock sound, was released on February 14, 2025.

== Band members ==
Current members

- Aryn Jonathan Black – vocals (2006–present)
- Asa Savage – rhythm guitar (2006–2010; 2018–present)
- Garth D. Condit - bass (2018–present)
- Adrian Arostone - lead guitar (2021–present)
- Ryan Henderson - drums (2022–present)

Former members

- Chris Cowart – lead guitar, backing vocals (2010–2019)
- Tom Frank – rhythm guitar, backing vocals (2012–2013)
- Shawn Alvear – drums (2010–2014; 2018–2019)
- Shaun Avants – bass, backing vocals (2007–2014)
- Chris Hodge – rhythm guitar, backing vocals (?–2010)
- Jon Rice – drums (2014–2017)
- Alec Padron - bass, backing vocals (2014–2017)
- AJ Vincent - organs, keyboards (2015–2017)
- Jonas Wikstrand - drums (2021–2022)
- Jeremy Eusevio Cruz - drums (2006–2010)
- Erick Sanger - bass (2006–2007)

== Discography ==
Studio albums

- Scorpion Child (2013)
- Acid Roulette (2016)
- I Saw the End as It Passed Right Through Me (2025)

Singles

- "Livin with a Witch" (2010)
- "Polygon of Eyes" (2013)
- "She Sings,I Kill" (2015)
- "Outliers" (2024)
- "Be the Snake" (2024)
- "Actress" (2025)

EPs

- Thy Southern Sting (2009)

Compilations/live albums

- Live at the Good Music Club (2012)
- Sweet Leaf-A Tribute To Black sabbath (2015)
