= Contradiction (band) =

German thrash metal band

Contradiction was a German thrash metal band.

The group was founded in 1989 and was from Wuppertal.

== Discography ==
- Rules of Peace (1993)
- All We Hate! (1995)
- Contraminated (2001)
- The Voice of Hatred (2005)
- The Warchitect (2006)
- The Essence of Anger (2009)
- The Origin of Violence (2014)
