= High Country Tour =

2015–2016 concert tour by the Sword

- Promotional tour by The Sword
- Location: Europe; North America
- Associated album: High Country
- Start date: August 21, 2015
- End date: May 28, 2016
- Legs: 3
- No. of shows: 75
- Supporting acts: Black Temple; The Iron Heel; Communication Killer; Mosh36; Suffocation; Nile; Hark; Hang the Bastard; Kadavar; All Them Witches; Royal Thunder

The Sword concert chronology
- Apocryphon Tour (2012–2013); High Country Tour (2015–2016)

The High Country Tour was a concert tour by American heavy metal band the Sword. Staged in support of the band's 2015 fifth studio album High Country, the tour visited venues worldwide in 2015 and 2016. Comprising six legs and 111 shows, the tour began in Trondheim, Norway at the Pstereo Festival on August 21, 2015 and concluded on May 28, 2016 in Dallas, Texas.

== Background ==
The opening European leg of the High Country Tour was detailed in tandem with the official announcement of the album on June 2, 2015, with the news also stating that the band would continue touring throughout 2015 and 2016. A few days before the release of the album and the beginning of the tour, two legs of North American dates were added starting on October 9, 2015 in Dallas, including appearances at the festivals Knotfest and Aftershock. The support acts were announced as Kadavar and All Them Witches for the first leg, and Royal Thunder for the second. In December 2015, a leg of eight concerts in Australia and New Zealand in February 2016 with the support acts American Sharks and Clowns was announced. The two final legs of the tour, both taking place in North America in Spring 2016, were announced in late January 2016. Royal Thunder returned as the support act for the first leg while the Sword was supported by Purson for the second leg.

== Tour dates ==
| Date | City | Country | Venue | Other act(s) |
Europe
| August 21, 2015 | Trondheim | Norway | Marinen | Various (Pstereo Festival) |
| August 22, 2015 | Oslo | Norway | Parkteatret | Black Temple |
| August 23, 2015 | Gothenburg | Sweden | Sticky Fingers | Black Temple |
| August 25, 2015 | Helsinki | Finland | Tavastia Club | Black Temple |
| August 27, 2015 | Stockholm | Sweden | Debaser Strand | Black Temple |
| August 28, 2015 | Malmö | Sweden | Kulturbolaget | Black Temple |
| August 29, 2015 | Copenhagen | Denmark | Lille Vega | Black Temple |
| August 30, 2015 | Hamburg | Germany | Rock Café St Pauli | —N/a |
| August 31, 2015 | Berlin | Germany | Magnet Club | —N/a |
| September 2, 2015 | Vienna | Austria | Vienna Arena | The Iron Heel; Communication Killer |
| September 3, 2015 | Munich | Germany | Backstage | Mosh36; Suffocation; Nile |
| September 4, 2015 | Milan | Italy | Legend Club | —N/a |
| September 5, 2015 | Salzburg | Austria | Rockhouse | —N/a |
| September 6, 2015 | Winterthur | Switzerland | Salzhaus | —N/a |
| September 7, 2015 | Stuttgart | Germany | Universum | —N/a |
| September 9, 2015 | Antwerp | Belgium | Trix Club | —N/a |
| September 10, 2015 | Tilburg | Netherlands | Extase | —N/a |
| September 11, 2015 | Cologne | Germany | Luxor | —N/a |
| September 12, 2015 | Paris | France | La Boule Noire | —N/a |
| September 14, 2015 | Nottingham | England | Rock City Basement | Hark |
| September 15, 2015 | Glasgow | Scotland | King Tut's Wah Wah Hut | —N/a |
| September 16, 2015 | Manchester | England | Academy 3 | Hang the Bastard |
| September 17, 2015 | Wolverhampton | England | Slade Rooms | —N/a |
| September 18, 2015 | London | England | Camden Underworld | Hang the Bastard |
| September 19, 2015 | Bristol | England | The Thekla | —N/a |
North America
| October 9, 2015 | Dallas | United States | Gas Monkey Live! | Kadavar; All Them Witches |
| October 10, 2015 | Austin | United States | The Mohawk | Kadavar; All Them Witches |
| October 11, 2015 | Houston | United States | Fitzgerald's | Kadavar; All Them Witches |
| October 13, 2015 | Lawrence | United States | Granada Theater | Kadavar; All Them Witches |
| October 14, 2015 | Madison | United States | Majestic Theatre | Kadavar; All Them Witches |
| October 15, 2015 | Iowa City | United States | Gabe's Oasis | Kadavar; All Them Witches |
| October 16, 2015 | Minneapolis | United States | Mill City Nights | Kadavar; All Them Witches |
| October 17, 2015 | Omaha | United States | The Waiting Room Lounge | Kadavar; All Them Witches |
| October 18, 2015 | Tulsa | United States | Cain's Ballroom | Kadavar; All Them Witches |
| October 20, 2015 | Mesa | United States | Club Red | Kadavar; All Them Witches |
| October 21, 2015 | Las Vegas | United States | Vinyl | Kadavar; All Them Witches |
| October 22, 2015 | San Diego | United States | Belly Up | Kadavar; All Them Witches |
| October 23, 2015 | San Francisco | United States | Slim's | Kadavar; All Them Witches |
| October 24, 2015 | San Bernardino | United States | San Manuel Amphitheater | Various (Knotfest) |
| October 25, 2015 | Sacramento | United States | Gibson Ranch Park | Various (Aftershock Festival) |
| October 27, 2015 | Seattle | United States | Neumos | Kadavar; All Them Witches |
| October 28, 2015 | Vancouver | Canada | Rickshaw Theatre | Kadavar; All Them Witches |
| October 29, 2015 | Portland | United States | Wonder Ballroom | Kadavar; All Them Witches |
| October 30, 2015 | Boise | United States | Neurolux | All Them Witches |
| October 31, 2015 | Salt Lake City | United States | Club Sound | All Them Witches |
| November 2, 2015 | Denver | United States | Gothic Theatre | All Them Witches |
| November 3, 2015 | Albuquerque | United States | Launchpad | All Them Witches |
| November 4, 2015 | Lubbock | United States | Jake's Backroom | All Them Witches |
North America
| November 18, 2015 | New Orleans | United States | One Eyed Jacks | Royal Thunder |
| November 19, 2015 | Atlanta | United States | The Masquerade | Royal Thunder |
| November 20, 2015 | St. Petersburg | United States | State Theatre | Royal Thunder |
| November 21, 2015 | Jacksonville Beach | United States | Freebird Live | Royal Thunder |
| November 23, 2015 | Birmingham | United States | Saturn | Royal Thunder |
| November 24, 2015 | Nashville | United States | Exit/In | Royal Thunder |
| November 25, 2015 | Asheville | United States | The Orange Peel | Royal Thunder |
| November 27, 2015 | Carrboro | United States | Cat's Cradle | Royal Thunder |
| November 28, 2015 | Charlotte | United States | Neighbourhood Theatre | Royal Thunder |
| November 29, 2015 | Washington, D.C. | United States | Rock & Roll Hotel | Royal Thunder |
| December 1, 2015 | New York City | United States | Webster Hall | Royal Thunder |
| December 2, 2015 | Cambridge | United States | The Sinclair | Royal Thunder |
| December 3, 2015 | Albany | United States | Northern Lights | Royal Thunder |
| December 4, 2015 | Philadelphia | United States | Trocadero Theatre | Royal Thunder |
| December 5, 2015 | Buffalo | United States | Town Ballroom | Royal Thunder |
| December 6, 2015 | Toronto | Canada | The Opera House | Royal Thunder |
| December 8, 2015 | Pittsburgh | United States | Mr. Small's Theatre | Royal Thunder |
| December 9, 2015 | Cleveland | United States | Agora Theatre and Ballroom | Royal Thunder |
| December 10, 2015 | Ann Arbor | United States | Blind Pig | Royal Thunder |
| December 11, 2015 | Grand Rapids | United States | Pyramid Scheme | Royal Thunder |
| December 12, 2015 | Chicago | United States | Thalia Hall | Royal Thunder |
| December 13, 2015 | St. Louis | United States | The Ready Room | Royal Thunder |
| December 15, 2015 | Memphis | United States | 1884 Lounge | Royal Thunder |
| December 16, 2015 | Little Rock | United States | Juanita's Cantina and Ballroom | Royal Thunder |
| December 17, 2015 | Oklahoma City | United States | ACM | Royal Thunder |
| December 18, 2015 | San Antonio | United States | Paper Tiger | Royal Thunder |
| December 19, 2015 | Corpus Christi | United States | House of Rock | Royal Thunder |
