= Apocryphon Tour =

2012–13 concert tour by the Sword

- Promotional tour by The Sword
- Promotional poster
- Location: North America, Europe, Australia
- Associated album: Apocryphon
- Start date: October 29, 2012
- End date: November 23, 2013
- Legs: 9
- No. of shows: 163

The Sword concert chronology
- Warp Riders Tour (2010–2011); Apocryphon Tour (2012–2013); High Country Tour (2015–2016)

The Apocryphon Tour was a worldwide concert tour by American heavy metal band the Sword, in promotion of the band's 2012 fourth studio album Apocryphon. Beginning on October 29, 2012 in the United States, it is currently scheduled for nine legs with 163 shows in total, visiting countries in North America, Europe and Australasia. The Apocryphon Tour is the band's first full concert tour without original drummer Trivett Wingo, who left early into the Warp Riders Tour, and is also the first with current drummer Santiago "Jimmy" Vela III, who replaced Kevin Fender in October 2011.

== Background ==
The first dates confirmed for the Apocryphon Tour were the opening two legs in the United States between October and December 2012, which were announced on the band's official website on September 5, 2012 along with the European release information for Apocryphon. Support acts for the opening 37 shows were also confirmed: Gpysyhawk as the primary support act at all shows, Eagle Claw as the third band for the first 23 shows, and American Sharks for the last 14 shows. Plans of a European leg in early 2013 were also revealed, with the first dates officially confirmed by the Sword's European label Napalm Records later in September.

A third North America headline leg of the tour was announced in June 2013, and will take place throughout July and August.

== Set lists ==
Set list No. 1
1. "The Veil of Isis"
2. "Hammer of Heaven"
3. "Tres Brujas"
4. "Maiden, Mother & Crone"
5. "The Horned Goddess"
6. "Cloak of Feathers"
7. "The Hidden Masters"
8. "Seven Sisters"
9. "Freya"
10. "To Take the Black"
11. "Eyes of the Stormwitch"
12. "Apocryphon"
13. "The Chronomancer I: Hubris"

Encore

14. "Barael's Blade"
15. "Winter's Wolves"
Set list No. 4
1. "Apocryphon"
2. "Freya"
3. "Hammer of Heaven"
4. "Tres Brujas"
5. "To Take the Black"
6. "Cloak of Feathers"
7. "The Hidden Masters"
8. "Dying Earth"
9. "Maiden, Mother & Crone"
10. "Night City"
11. "Seven Sisters"
12. "Eyes of the Stormwitch"
13. "The Horned Goddess"
14. "The Veil of Isis"

Encore

15. "Barael's Blade"
16. "Winter's Wolves"
Set list No. 7
1. "Apocryphon"
2. "Freya"
3. "Hammer of Heaven"
4. "Codex Corvidae"
5. "Tres Brujas"
6. "To Take the Black"
7. "Cloak of Feathers"
8. "The Hidden Masters"
9. "Dying Earth"
10. "Maiden, Mother & Crone"
11. "Execrator"
12. "Seven Sisters"
13. "The Horned Goddess"
14. "The Veil of Isis"

Encore

15. "Barael's Blade"
16. "Winter's Wolves"
Set list No. 10
1. "Apocryphon"
2. "Freya"
3. "Hammer of Heaven"
4. "Codex Corvidae"
5. "Tres Brujas"
6. "To Take the Black"
7. "Cloak of Feathers"
8. "The Hidden Masters"
9. "Dying Earth"
10. "Maiden, Mother & Crone"
11. "Arrows in the Dark"
12. "Seven Sisters"
13. "The Horned Goddess"
14. "The Veil of Isis"

Encore

15. "Cheap Sunglasses" (ZZ Top cover)
16. "Ebethron"
Set list No. 13
1. "Apocryphon"
2. "Freya"
3. "Hammer of Heaven"
4. "Codex Corvidae"
5. "Tres Brujas"
6. "To Take the Black"
7. "Cloak of Feathers"
8. "The Hidden Masters"
9. "Dying Earth"
10. "Maiden, Mother & Crone"
11. "The Horned Goddess"
12. "Seven Sisters"
13. "Night City"
14. "The Veil of Isis"

Encore

15. "Barael's Blade"
16. "Cheap Sunglasses" (ZZ Top cover)
17. "Winter's Wolves"
Set list No. 16
1. "Apocryphon"
2. "Freya"
3. "Hammer of Heaven"
4. "How Heavy This Axe"
5. "Tres Brujas"
6. "Cloak of Feathers"
7. "Dying Earth"
8. "Execrator"
9. "Maiden, Mother & Crone"
10. "To Take the Black"
11. "Seven Sisters"
12. "Eyes of the Stormwitch"
13. "Arrows in the Dark"
14. "The Veil of Isis"

Encore

15. "Winter's Wolves"
16. "Barael's Blade"
17. "Iron Swan"
Set list No. 19
1. "The Veil of Isis"
2. "Freya"
3. "Hammer of Heaven"
4. "Tres Brujas"
5. "How Heavy This Axe"
6. "Cloak of Feathers"
7. "Arcane Montane"
8. "Dying Earth"
9. "Maiden, Mother & Crone"
10. "To Take the Black"
11. "Seven Sisters"
12. "Arrows in the Dark"
13. "Night City"
14. "Apocryphon"

Encore

15. "Barael's Blade"
16. "Winter's Wolves"
Set list No. 22
1. "Apocryphon"
2. "How Heavy This Axe"
3. "Tres Brujas"
4. "Cloak of Feathers"
5. "Arcane Montane"
6. "Dying Earth"
7. "Maiden, Mother & Crone"
8. "To Take the Black"
9. "Hammer of Heaven"
10. "Freya"
11. "Seven Sisters"
12. "Eyes of the Stormwitch"
13. "Arrows in the Dark"
14. "The Veil of Isis"

Encore

15. "Iron Swan"
Set list No. 25
1. "Apocryphon"
2. "Tres Brujas"
3. "How Heavy This Axe"
4. "Cloak of Feathers"
5. "Arcane Montane"
6. "Dying Earth"
7. "Freya"
8. "To Take the Black"
9. "Maiden, Mother & Crone"
10. "Execrator"
11. "Seven Sisters"
12. "Night City"
13. "Arrows in the Dark"
14. "Eyes of the Stormwitch"
15. "The Veil of Isis"

Encore

16. "Cheap Sunglasses" (ZZ Top cover)
17. "Winter's Wolves"
Set list No. 28
1. "Tres Brujas"
2. "The Veil of Isis"
3. "Freya"
4. "Cloak of Feathers"
5. "How Heavy This Axe"
6. "Maiden, Mother & Crone"
7. "Barael's Blade"
8. "Apocryphon"
Set list No. 2
1. "The Veil of Isis"
2. "Fire Lances of the Ancient Hyperzephyrians"
3. "Hammer of Heaven"
4. "Barael's Blade"
5. "Maiden, Mother & Crone"
6. "How Heavy This Axe"
7. "Cloak of Feathers"
8. "The Hidden Masters"
9. "Execrator"
10. "Freya"
11. "To Take the Black"
12. "Tres Brujas"
13. "Apocryphon"
14. "The Chronomancer I: Hubris"

Encore

15. "Eyes of the Stormwitch"
16. "Winter's Wolves"
Set list No. 5
1. "Apocryphon"
2. "Freya"
3. "Hammer of Heaven"
4. "Codex Corvidae"
5. "Tres Brujas"
6. "To Take the Black"
7. "The Hidden Masters"
8. "Dying Earth"
9. "Execrator"
10. "Maiden, Mother & Crone"
11. "The Horned Goddess"
12. "Seven Sisters"
13. "The Veil of Isis"
14. "Lament for the Aurochs"

Encore

15. "Barael's Blade"
16. "Winter's Wolves"
Set list No. 8
1. "Apocryphon"
2. "Freya"
3. "Hammer of Heaven"
4. "Codex Corvidae"
5. "Tres Brujas"
6. "To Take the Black"
7. "Cloak of Feathers"
8. "The Hidden Masters"
9. "Dying Earth"
10. "Maiden, Mother & Crone"
11. "Seven Sisters"
12. "The Horned Goddess"
13. "The Veil of Isis"

Encore

14. "Barael's Blade"
15. "Winter's Wolves"
Set list No. 11
1. "Apocryphon"
2. "Freya"
3. "Hammer of Heaven"
4. "Codex Corvidae"
5. "Tres Brujas"
6. "Maiden, Mother & Crone"
7. "Cloak of Feathers"
8. "The Hidden Masters"
9. "Dying Earth"
10. "To Take the Black"
11. "Seven Sisters"
12. "Eyes of the Stormwitch"
13. "Arrows in the Dark"
14. "The Veil of Isis"

Encore

15. "Barael's Blade"
16. "Winter's Wolves"
Set list No. 14
1. "Apocryphon"
2. "Freya"
3. "Hammer of Heaven"
4. "How Heavy This Axe"
5. "Tres Brujas"
6. "Cloak of Feathers"
7. "Arcane Montane"
8. "Dying Earth"
9. "Maiden, Mother & Crone"
10. "To Take the Black"
11. "Execrator"
12. "Seven Sisters"
13. "Arrows in the Dark"
14. "The Veil of Isis"

Encore

15. "Barael's Blade"
16. "Winter's Wolves"
Set list No. 17
1. "Apocryphon"
2. "Freya"
3. "Hammer of Heaven"
4. "Tres Brujas"
5. "How Heavy This Axe"
6. "Cloak of Feathers"
7. "The Hidden Masters"
8. "Dying Earth"
9. "Maiden, Mother & Crone"
10. "To Take the Black"
11. "Seven Sisters"
12. "The Horned Goddess"
13. "Arrows in the Dark"
14. "The Veil of Isis"

Encore

15. "Barael's Blade"
16. "Winter's Wolves"
Set list No. 20
1. "The Veil of Isis"
2. "Freya"
3. "Hammer of Heaven"
4. "Tres Brujas"
5. "How Heavy This Axe"
6. "Cloak of Feathers"
7. "Arcane Montane"
8. "Dying Earth"
9. "Maiden, Mother & Crone"
10. "To Take the Black"
11. "Seven Sisters"
12. "Lawless Lands"
13. "Eyes of the Stormwitch"
14. "Apocryphon"

Encore

15. "Barael's Blade"
16. "Winter's Wolves"
Set list No. 23
1. "Apocryphon"
2. "Tres Brujas"
3. "How Heavy This Axe"
4. "Cloak of Feathers"
5. "The Hidden Masters"
6. "Dying Earth"
7. "Maiden, Mother & Crone"
8. "To Take the Black"
9. "Freya"
10. "Eyes of the Stormwitch"
11. "Seven Sisters"
12. "Lawless Lands"
13. "Ebethron"
14. "The Veil of Isis"

Encore

15. "Cheap Sunglasses" (ZZ Top cover)
16. "Arrows in the Dark"
Set list No. 26
1. "Tres Brujas"
2. "The Veil of Isis"
3. "Freya"
4. "Maiden, Mother & Crone"
5. "Cloak of Feathers"
6. "How Heavy This Axe"
7. "Barael's Blade"
8. "Apocryphon"
Set list No. 3
1. "Apocryphon"
2. "Freya"
3. "Hammer of Heaven"
4. "Tres Brujas"
5. "Maiden, Mother & Crone"
6. "Arcane Montane"
7. "The Hidden Masters"
8. "Dying Earth"
9. "Seven Sisters"
10. "The Horned Goddess"
11. "Codex Corvidae"
12. "How Heavy This Axe"
13. "Lawless Lands"
14. "The Veil of Isis"

Encore

15. "Barael's Blade"
16. "Winter's Wolves"
Set list No. 6
1. "Apocryphon"
2. "Freya"
3. "Hammer of Heaven"
4. "Codex Corvidae"
5. "Tres Brujas"
6. "Cloak of Feathers"
7. "Dying Earth"
8. "The Hidden Masters"
9. "To Take the Black"
10. "Night City"
11. "Seven Sisters"
12. "Maiden, Mother & Crone"
13. "The Veil of Isis"
14. "The Horned Goddess"

Encore

15. "Barael's Blade"
16. "Winter's Wolves"
Set list No. 9
1. "Apocryphon"
2. "Freya"
3. "Hammer of Heaven"
4. "Codex Corvidae"
5. "Tres Brujas"
6. "To Take the Black"
7. "Cloak of Feathers"
8. "The Hidden Masters"
9. "Dying Earth"
10. "Maiden, Mother & Crone"
11. "Arrows in the Dark"
12. "Seven Sisters"
13. "The Horned Goddess"
14. "The Veil of Isis"

Encore

15. "Barael's Blade"
16. "Winter's Wolves"
Set list No. 12
1. "Apocryphon"
2. "Freya"
3. "Hammer of Heaven"
4. "Codex Corvidae"
5. "Tres Brujas"
6. "To Take the Black"
7. "Cloak of Feathers"
8. "The Hidden Masters"
9. "Dying Earth"
10. "Maiden, Mother & Crone"
11. "The Horned Goddess"
12. "Seven Sisters"
13. "Arrows in the Dark"
14. "The Veil of Isis"

Encore

15. "Barael's Blade"
16. "Winter's Wolves"
Set list No. 15
1. "Apocryphon"
2. "Freya"
3. "Hammer of Heaven"
4. "How Heavy This Axe"
5. "Tres Brujas"
6. "Cloak of Feathers"
7. "Dying Earth"
8. "Execrator"
9. "Maiden, Mother & Crone"
10. "To Take the Black"
11. "Seven Sisters"
12. "Eyes of the Stormwitch"
13. "Arrows in the Dark"
14. "The Veil of Isis"

Encore

15. "Cheap Sunglasses" (ZZ Top cover)
16. "Winter's Wolves"
Set list No. 18
1. "The Veil of Isis"
2. "Freya"
3. "Hammer of Heaven"
4. "Tres Brujas"
5. "How Heavy This Axe"
6. "Cloak of Feathers"
7. "Arcane Montane"
8. "Dying Earth"
9. "Maiden, Mother & Crone"
10. "To Take the Black"
11. "Seven Sisters"
12. "Lawless Lands"
13. "Ebethron"
14. "Apocryphon"

Encore

15. "Barael's Blade"
16. "Iron Swan"
Set list No. 21
1. "Apocryphon"
2. "How Heavy This Axe"
3. "Tres Brujas"
4. "Cloak of Feathers"
5. "Arcane Montane"
6. "Dying Earth"
7. "Maiden, Mother & Crone"
8. "To Take the Black"
9. "Hammer of Heaven"
10. "Freya"
11. "Seven Sisters"
12. "Eyes of the Stormwitch"
13. "Arrows in the Dark"
14. "The Veil of Isis"
Set list No. 24
1. "Apocryphon"
2. "Tres Brujas"
3. "How Heavy This Axe"
4. "Cloak of Feathers"
5. "Arcane Montane"
6. "Dying Earth"
7. "Maiden, Mother & Crone"
8. "To Take the Black"
9. "Freya"
10. "Seven Sisters"
11. "Arrows in the Dark"
12. "Lawless Lands"
13. "The Veil of Isis"
Set list No. 27
1. "The Horned Goddess"
2. "Arrows in the Dark"
3. "The Hidden Masters"
4. "Dying Earth"
5. "Night City"
6. "Seven Sisters"
7. "Arcane Montane"
8. "The Black River"
9. "Winter's Wolves"

== Tour dates ==
Date	City	Country	Venue	Support act(s)	Set list
Leg 1: North America I (headlining)
October 29, 2012	Corpus Christi	United States	House of Rock	Gypsyhawk, Eagle Claw	
October 30, 2012	Denton	United States	Rubber Gloves Rehearsal Studios	Gypsyhawk, Eagle Claw	1
October 31, 2012	Oklahoma City	United States	Academy of Contemporary Music	Gypsyhawk, Eagle Claw	
November 1, 2012	Little Rock	United States	Downtown Music Hall	Gypsyhawk, Eagle Claw	
November 2, 2012	Shreveport	United States	Riverside Warehouse	Gypsyhawk, Eagle Claw	2
November 3, 2012	Austin	United States	Fun Fun Fun Fest	Gypsyhawk, Eagle Claw	
November 5, 2012	Lincoln	United States	Bourbon Theater	Gypsyhawk, Eagle Claw	
November 6, 2012	Minneapolis	United States	First Avenue	Gypsyhawk, Eagle Claw	
November 7, 2012	Chicago	United States	Double Door	Gypsyhawk, Eagle Claw	3
November 8, 2012	Columbus	United States	The A&R Bar	Gypsyhawk, Eagle Claw	4
November 9, 2012	Cleveland	United States	Grog Shop	Gypsyhawk, Eagle Claw	
November 10, 2012	Covington	United States	Madison Theater	Gypsyhawk, Eagle Claw	5
November 11, 2012	Detroit	United States	Saint Andrew's Hall	Gypsyhawk, Eagle Claw	
November 13, 2012	Philadelphia	United States	Union Transfer	Gypsyhawk, Eagle Claw	6
November 14, 2012	New York City	United States	Webster Hall	Gypsyhawk, Eagle Claw	7
November 15, 2012	Pawtucket	United States	The Met	Gypsyhawk, Eagle Claw	8
November 16, 2012	Cambridge	United States	The Middle East	Gypsyhawk, Eagle Claw	8
November 17, 2012	Washington, D.C.	United States	Rock & Roll Hotel	Gypsyhawk, Eagle Claw	9
November 19, 2012	Birmingham	United States	Workplay Theater	Gypsyhawk, Eagle Claw	10
November 20, 2012	Orlando	United States	Beacham	Gypsyhawk, Eagle Claw	
November 21, 2012	Atlanta	United States	The Masquerade	Gypsyhawk, Eagle Claw	11
November 22, 2012	Nashville	United States	Exit/In	Gypsyhawk, Eagle Claw	
November 23, 2012	Memphis	United States	Hi Tone	Gypsyhawk, Eagle Claw	12
November 24, 2012	Baton Rouge	United States	Spanish Moon	Gypsyhawk, Eagle Claw	
Leg 2: North America II (headlining)
December 2, 2012	Tulsa	United States	Eclipse	Gypsyhawk, American Sharks	
December 3, 2012	Kansas City	United States	Record Bar	Gypsyhawk, American Sharks	
December 4, 2012	Denver	United States	Bluebird Theater	Gypsyhawk, American Sharks	13
December 5, 2012	Salt Lake City	United States	Urban Lounge	Gypsyhawk, American Sharks	
December 6, 2012	Boise	United States	Neurolux	Gypsyhawk, American Sharks	
December 7, 2012	Portland	United States	Hawthorne	Gypsyhawk, American Sharks	
December 8, 2012	Seattle	United States	Neumos	Gypsyhawk, American Sharks	
December 10, 2012	Sacramento	United States	Harlows	Gypsyhawk, American Sharks	
December 11, 2012	San Francisco	United States	Independent	Gypsyhawk, American Sharks	
December 12, 2012	Los Angeles	United States	El Rey Theatre	Gypsyhawk, American Sharks	12
December 13, 2012	San Diego	United States	Brick by Brick	Gypsyhawk, American Sharks	
December 14, 2012	Phoenix	United States	Club Red	Gypsyhawk, American Sharks	14
December 15, 2012	Tucson	United States	Hotel Congress	Gypsyhawk, American Sharks	
December 17, 2012	Dallas	United States	Trees	Gypsyhawk, American Sharks	15
December 18, 2012	Houston	United States	Fitzgerald's	Gypsyhawk, American Sharks	
December 19, 2012	Austin	United States	Emo's	Gypsyhawk, American Sharks	
Leg 3: Europe I (headlining)
January 6, 2013	Wolverhampton	England	Slade Rooms	Lonely Kamel	
January 7, 2013	Glasgow	Scotland	ABC 2	Lonely Kamel	16
January 8, 2013	Manchester	England	Academy 3	Lonely Kamel	17
January 9, 2013	Bristol	England	The Fleece	Lonely Kamel	
January 10, 2013	London	England	Camden Underworld	Lonely Kamel	18
January 12, 2013	Antwerp	Belgium	Trix	Lonely Kamel	19
January 13, 2013	Nijmegen	Netherlands	Doornroosje	Lonely Kamel	20
January 14, 2013	Cologne	Germany	Underground	Lonely Kamel	21
January 15, 2013	Berlin	Germany	Magnet Club	Lonely Kamel	21
January 16, 2013	Hamburg	Germany	Logo	Lonely Kamel	
January 18, 2013	Gothenburg	Sweden	Sticky Fingers	Lonely Kamel	22
January 19, 2013	Stockholm	Sweden	Debaser Slussen	Lonely Kamel	23
January 21, 2013	Helsinki	Finland	Tavastia Club	Lonely Kamel	
January 22, 2013	Tampere	Finland	Klubi	Lonely Kamel	
January 24, 2013	Oslo	Norway	John Dee	Lonely Kamel	24
January 25, 2013	Norrköping	Sweden	Dynamo	Lonely Kamel	
January 26, 2013	Malmö	Sweden	Debaser	Lonely Kamel	
January 27, 2013	Copenhagen	Denmark	Lille Vega	Lonely Kamel	25
Leg 4: Australia (Soundwave and supporting DragonForce)
February 23, 2013	Brisbane	Australia	RNA Showgrounds	Various (Soundwave)	26
February 24, 2013	Sydney	Australia	Sydney Olympic Park	Various (Soundwave)	
February 25, 2013	Melbourne	Australia	Billboard	DragonForce (supporting)	27
February 28, 2013	Sydney	Australia	The Metro Theatre	DragonForce (supporting)	27
March 1, 2013	Melbourne	Australia	Flemington Racecourse	Various (Soundwave)	28
March 2, 2013	Adelaide	Australia	Bonython Park	Various (Soundwave)	26
March 4, 2013	Perth	Australia	Claremont Showground	Various (Soundwave)	
Leg 5: North America III (headlining and supporting Clutch)
April 25, 2013	Memphis	United States	The New Daisy Theatre	KYNG	
April 26, 2013	Nashville	United States	Exit/In	KYNG	
April 27, 2013	Savannah	United States	The Jinx	KYNG	
April 28, 2013	Knoxville	United States	Bijou Theatre	KYNG	
April 29, 2013	Raleigh	United States	Lincoln Theatre	KYNG, Demon Eye	
May 1, 2013	Richmond	United States	The National	Clutch (supporting), Lionize	
May 2, 2013	New York City	United States	Terminal 5	Clutch (supporting), Lionize	
May 3, 2013	Clifton Park	United States	Upstate Concert Hall	Clutch (supporting), Lionize	
May 4, 2013	Portland	United States	State Theatre	Clutch (supporting), Lionize	
May 5, 2013	Boston	United States	House of Blues	Clutch (supporting), Lionize	
May 7, 2013	Charlotte	United States	Amos' Southend	Clutch (supporting), Lionize	
May 9, 2013	St. Petersburg	United States	State Theatre	Clutch (supporting), Lionize	
May 10, 2013	Fort Lauderdale	United States	Revolution Live	Clutch (supporting), Lionize	
May 11, 2013	Orlando	United States	House of Blues	Clutch (supporting), Lionize	
May 12, 2013	Pensacola	United States	Vinyl Music Hall	Clutch (supporting), Lionize	
May 14, 2013	New Orleans	United States	House of Blues	Clutch (supporting), Lionize	
May 15, 2013	Atlanta	United States	Center Stage Atlanta	Clutch (supporting), Lionize	
May 17, 2013	Philadelphia	United States	Electric Factory	Clutch (supporting), Lionize	
May 18, 2013	Columbus	United States	Columbus Crew Stadium	Various (Rock on the Range)	
May 19, 2013	Indianapolis	United States	The Vogue	Clutch (supporting), Lionize	
May 21, 2013	Milwaukee	United States	Turner Hall Ballroom	Clutch (supporting), Lionize	
May 22, 2013	Fargo	United States	The Venue	Clutch (supporting), Lionize	
May 23, 2013	Lincoln	United States	Bourbon Theater	Clutch (supporting), Lionize	
May 24, 2013	Pryor Creek	United States	1421 E 450 Road	Various (Rocklahoma)	
May 25, 2013	Houston	United States	House of Blues	Clutch (supporting), Lionize	
May 26, 2013	San Antonio	United States	AT&T Center	Various (River City Rock Fest)	
Leg 6: Europe II (festivals and headlining)
June 14, 2013	Castle Donington	England	Donington Park	Various (Download Festival)	
June 16, 2013	Nickelsdorf	Austria	Pannonia Fields II	Various (Nova Rock Festival)	
June 17, 2013	Augsburg	Germany	Kantine		
June 18, 2013	Konstanz	Germany	Kulturladen		
June 19, 2013	Milan	Italy	Live Club	Various (Flame Fest)	
June 20, 2013	Zürich	Switzerland	Volkshaus	Various (Earshakerday)	
June 21, 2013	Saarbrücken	Germany	Garage		
June 23, 2013	Clisson	France	Rue du Champ Louet	Various (Hellfest)	
June 24, 2013	Villeurbanne	France	Le Transbordeur		
June 25, 2013	Toulouse	France	La Dynamo		
June 26, 2013	Barcelona	Spain	Razzmatazz 3		
June 27, 2013	Almàssera	Spain	Rock City		
June 28, 2013	Vitoria-Gasteiz	Spain	Recinto Mendizabala	Various (Azkena Rock Festival)	
June 30, 2013	Dessel	Belgium	Kastelsedijk	Various (Graspop Metal Meeting)	
July 1, 2013	Deventer	Netherlands	Burgerweeshuis	Clutch (supporting)	
July 2, 2013	Eindhoven	Netherlands	Effenaar	Clutch (supporting), Red Fang, Komatsu	
July 3, 2013	Esch-sur-Alzette	Luxembourg	Rockhal		
July 6, 2013	Gothenburg	Sweden		Various (Metaltown Festival)	
July 7, 2013	Roskilde	Denmark	Festivalpladsen	Various (Roskilde Festival)	
Leg 7: North America IV (headlining)
July 25, 2013	Dallas	United States	Granada Theater	Castle, American Sharks	
July 26, 2013	Austin	United States	Red 7	Castle, American Sharks	
July 27, 2013	Abilene	United States	The Backroom	Castle, American Sharks	
July 28, 2013	Lubbock	United States	FUBAR	Castle, American Sharks	
July 30, 2013	Farmington	United States	TOP DECK	Castle, American Sharks	
July 31, 2013	Tempe	United States	Club Red	Castle, American Sharks	
August 1, 2013	Santa Ana	United States	Club Red	Castle, American Sharks	
August 2, 2013	San Francisco	United States	Slim's	Castle, American Sharks	
August 3, 2013	San Francisco	United States	Slim's	Castle, American Sharks	
August 5, 2013	Portland	United States	Hawthorne Theater	Castle, American Sharks	
August 6, 2013	Spokane	United States	Spokane Center	Castle, American Sharks	
August 7, 2013	Seattle	United States	Neumos	Castle, American Sharks	
August 8, 2013	Vancouver	Canada	The Biltmore	Castle, American Sharks	
August 10, 2013	Edmonton	Canada	The Starlite Ballroom	Castle, American Sharks	
August 11, 2013	Calgary	Canada	Republik	Castle, American Sharks	
August 12, 2013	Regina	Canada	The Exchange	Castle, American Sharks	
August 13, 2013	Winnipeg	Canada	Pyramid Cabaret	Castle, American Sharks	
August 14, 2013	Thunder Bay	Canada	Crocks	Castle, American Sharks	
August 15, 2013	Toronto	Canada	Lee's Palace	Castle, American Sharks	
August 17, 2013	Montreal	Canada	il Motore	Castle, American Sharks	
August 18, 2013	New York City	United States	Music Hall of Williamsburg	Castle, American Sharks	
August 19, 2013	West Chester	United States	The Note	Castle, American Sharks	
August 20, 2013	Baltimore	United States	The Ottobar	Castle, American Sharks	
August 21, 2013	Roanoke	United States	Martin's Downtown	Castle, American Sharks	
August 23, 2013	Baton Rouge	United States	Spanish Moon	Castle, American Sharks	
Leg 8: North America V (supporting Clutch)				Castle, American Sharks	
September 24, 2013	South Burlington	United States	Higher Ground	Clutch (supporting)	
September 26, 2013	Port Chester	United States	Capitol Theatre	Clutch (supporting)	
September 27, 2013	Huntington	United States	The Paramount	Clutch (supporting)	
September 28, 2013	Hampton Beach	United States	Hampton Beach Casino Ballroom	Clutch (supporting)	
Leg 9: North America VI
October 27, 2013	Charleston	United States	Music Farm	Clutch, American Sharks	
October 28, 2013	Athens	United States	Georgia Theatre	Clutch, American Sharks	
October 29, 2013	Chattanooga	United States	Track 29	Clutch, American Sharks	
October 31, 2013	Louisville	United States	Expo Five	Clutch, American Sharks	
November 1, 2013	Memphis	United States	Minglewood Hall	Clutch, American Sharks	
November 2, 2013	Oklahoma City	United States	Diamond Ballroom	Clutch, American Sharks	
November 4, 2013	Corpus Christi	United States	House of Rock	Clutch, American Sharks	
November 5, 2013	Austin	United States	Emo's East	Clutch, American Sharks	
November 7, 2013	Albuquerque	United States	Sunshine Theater	Clutch, American Sharks	
November 8, 2013	Tucson	United States	Rialto Theatre	Clutch, American Sharks	
November 9, 2013	West Hollywood	United States	House of Blues	Clutch, American Sharks	
November 10, 2013	San Diego	United States	House of Blues	Clutch, American Sharks	
November 11, 2013	Sacramento	United States	Ace of Spades	Clutch, American Sharks	
November 13, 2013	Grand Junction	United States	Mesa Theater and Club	Clutch, American Sharks	
November 14, 2013	Denver	United States	Ogden Theatre	Clutch, American Sharks	
November 15, 2013	Wichita	United States	Cotillion Ballroom	Clutch, American Sharks	
November 16, 2013	Columbia	United States	The Blue Note	Clutch, American Sharks	
November 17, 2013	Bloomington	United States	Castle Theatre	Clutch, American Sharks	
November 19, 2013	Joliet	United States	Mojoes	Clutch, American Sharks	
November 20, 2013	Madison	United States	Orpheum Theatre	Clutch, American Sharks	
November 21, 2013	Fort Wayne	United States	Piere's	Clutch, American Sharks	
November 22, 2013	Columbus	United States	Lifestyle Communities Pavilion	Clutch, American Sharks	
November 23, 2013	Detroit	United States	The Fillmore Detroit	Clutch, American Sharks	
November 24, 2013	Covington	United States	The Madison Theater	Valley of the Sun, Electric Citizen, American Sharks	

== Personnel ==
- J. D. Cronise – vocals, guitar
- Kyle Shutt – guitar
- Bryan Richie – bass
- Santiago "Jimmy" Vela III – drums
