= Ipso Facto (band) =

English psychedelic rock band

- Origin: London, England
- Genres: Neo-psychedelia, post-punk
- Years active: 2007–2009
- Past members: Rosalie Cunningham (vocals, guitar): Samantha Valentine (bass); Victoria Smith (drums); Cherish Kaya (keyboard)
- Website: Band website

Ipso Facto were an English goth-inflected, melodramatic psychedelic rock band. Founded in 2007 by Rosalie Cunningham (singer, songwriter, guitar), Victoria Smith (drums), Cherish Kaya (keyboards) and Samantha Valentine (bass guitar). They were based in London but individually originated from different parts of the UK, including Southend, Newcastle and Bedford. Before Ipso Facto, Cunningham and Valentine played in the Southend band Theoretical Girl.

The band appeared on the 'BBC Introducing Stage' at the Reading Festival, supporting The Last Shadow Puppets on their 2008 tour. They went on to support post-punk band Magazine on their 2009 reunion tour.

Ipso Facto split up while touring Italy in 2009, just before recording a new album. Cherish Kaya left first, citing in-fighting on musical direction as the key reason for her departure. Kaya went on to play keyboard and violin for Florence and the Machine before founding an independent record label, Kaya Kaya Records. Rosalie Cunningham founded Purson. Samantha Valentine joined Romance and founded secondhand childrenswear platform dotte. Victoria Smith became a touring drummer for groups such as MIA, Jamie T, Miles Kane and Soulwax.

== Discography ==
=== Singles ===
- "Harmonise" / "Balderdash" (Disc Error), October 2007
- "Ears and Eyes" (PureGroove), August 2008
- "Six and Three-Quarters" / "Circle of Fifths" (Mute Records), October 2008

=== EPs ===
- IF... (Vinyl Junkie, Japan), February 2009
