= Rosalie Cunningham =

Musical artist (born 1990)

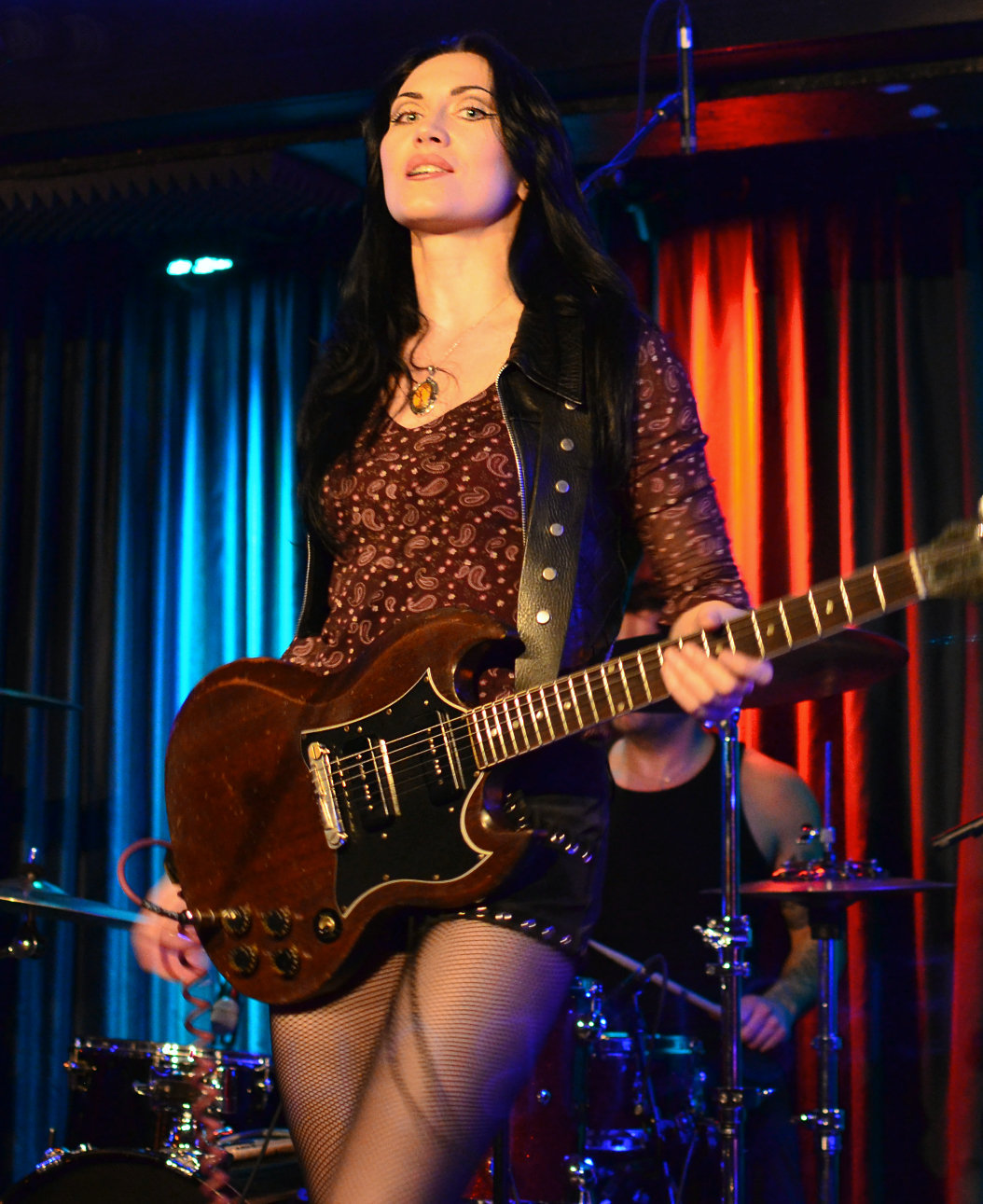
- Cunningham performing in 2026

Background information
- Born: Rosalie Jo Cunningham; 25 April 1990 (age 36); Southend-on-Sea, England
- Occupation: Singer-songwriter
- Instruments: Vocals; guitar; keyboards
- Years active: 2007–present
- Label: Cherry Red
- Formerly of: Ipso Facto; Purson
- Website: rosaliecunningham.com

Rosalie Jo Cunningham (born 25 April 1990) is an English singer-songwriter that started with the band Ipso Facto in 2007. After their break-up, Cunningham started a new project named Purson in 2011. However, she has performed as a solo artist since 2017, following the end of her previous project.

== Career ==
Cunningham was born in Southend-on-Sea, Essex, England, formed her first commercial band Ipso Facto in 2007, releasing the singles "Harmonise" / "Balderdash" (Disc Error) in October 2007, "Ears and Eyes" (PureGroove) in August 2008, "Six and Three Quarters" / "Circle of Fifths" Mute Records in October 2008. These were followed by IF... a Vinyl Junkie release in February 2009. All of their songs were written by Cunningham.

Ipso Facto broke up midway through 2009. Cunningham subsequently founded the psychedelic rock band Purson, with which she toured, composed and recorded for the next eight years. In April 2017 Purson also broke up. "I feel strongly drawn to a more DIY approach to my career in music, and look forward to the freedom to explore many avenues as a solo artist," Cunningham explained. Her debut solo studio album Rosalie Cunningham was released on 5 June 2019 by Esoteric Records, via Cherry Red.

Cunningham has also been working with other bands such as Magazine and the Last Shadow Puppets (though referred to as Rosie Cunningham) as a backing vocalist, appearing on stage with them on their recent tours, at the BBC Electric Proms and on Later... with Jools Holland. She also played keyboards from January to May 2010 with These New Puritans on their tours of the album, Hidden.

On 25 February 2022 she released her second studio album Two Piece Puzzle.

== Discography ==
with Ipso Facto

Singles

- Harmonise/Balderdash
- Ears and Eyes
- Six and Three-Quarters/Circle of Fifths
- IF...

with Purson

Albums

- 2013: The Circle and the Blue Door (Rise Above/Metal Blade)
- 2014: In the Meantime EP (Machine Elf Records), October 2014
- 2016: Desire's Magic Theatre (Spinefarm Records), April 2016

Solo

Albums

- 2019: Rosalie Cunningham (Cherry Red Records)
- 2022: Two Piece Puzzle
- 2023: Live At Acapela
- 2024: To Shoot Another Day
