= The Circle and the Blue Door =

Studio album by Purson
- Released: 29 April 2013
- Length: 47:43
- Label: Rise Above

Purson chronology
The Circle and the Blue Door (2013)	Desire's Magic Theatre (2016)

The Circle and the Blue Door is the debut studio album from British rock band Purson. The album was released on 29 April 2013, via Rise Above Records.

== Reception ==
Professional ratings
Review scores
Source	Rating
AllMusic	3.5/5 stars
Blabbermouth.net	8/10
DIY	3.5/5
Drowned in Sound	6/10
Pitchfork	7.2/10
Sputnikmusic	4.0/5

The Circle and the Blue Door received favourable reviews from professional critics.

New Noise compared the album songs to such greats as Pink Floyd, Janis Joplin, Camel, Blackmore's Night and The Beatles' record Magical Mystery Tour.

== Track listing ==
1. "Wake Up Sleepy Head" – 2:06
2. "The Contract" – 4:11
3. "Spiderwood Farm" – 5:09
4. "Sailor's Wife's Lament" – 3:59
5. "Leaning On a Bear" – 3:27
6. "Tempest and the Tide" – 5:06
7. "Mavericks and Mystics" – 3:48
8. "Well Spoiled Machine" – 5:09
9. "Sapphire Ward" – 5:02
10. "Rocking Horse" – 4:25
11. "Tragic Catastrophe" – 5:21
