= Fitzgerald's =

Coordinates: 29.7819°N 95.3880°W

- Fitz
- Interactive map of Fitzgerald's
- Former names: Dom Polski (1918-48); Dompolski Hall (1948-58); Polish Home, Inc. (1958-74)
- Address: 2706 White Oak Dr; Houston, TX 77007-2715
- Location: Greater Heights
- Owner: Sara Fitzgerald
- Operator: Transmission Events (2016-2018)
- Capacity: 1,000

Construction
- Opened: June 2, 1918
- Closed: December 31, 2018

Website
- Venue Website

Fitzgerald's was one of the oldest and widely recognized live music venues in the Greater Houston area. The club had been at the top of the live music scene in Houston since it opened in 1977. Fitzgerald's is commonly referred to as "Fitz.” Fitzgerald’s closed and the 100-year-old building was demolished in 2019. A parking lot was built in its place.

== History ==
The building was built in 1918, and for over half a century it was home to the Dom Polski, a Polish center and dance hall. In 1977, Sara Fitzgerald purchased the property and opened one of Houston's oldest and best known live music venues. The building and business was leased from September 2010 until Jan 2016 to a group outside group while Sara Fitzgerald retained ownership. Sara Fitzgerald took over the reins again in early 2016 till its closure in 2018. The final show was December 31, 2018.

== Artists ==
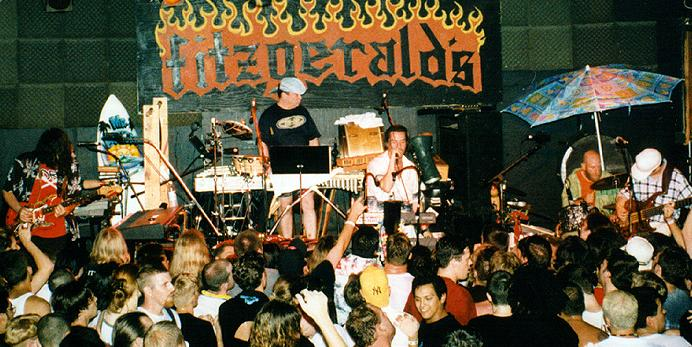
Mr. Bungle playing at Fitz in 1999

Fitzgerald's boasted two fully equipped event rooms — one upstairs and one downstairs (often referred to by locals as "Zelda's") — both complete with stage, professional sound and lights, and two premium stocked bars. The stages at Fitzgerald's have seen thousands of up-and-coming acts, regionally successful artists, and national tours come across them over the years. Kayote, ZZ Top, David Allan Coe, James Brown, Etta James, Dennis Miller and many more helped get things off the ground in the late 70s and early 80s. R.E.M., The Ramones, Cross Canadian Ragweed, Mr. Bungle, Sonic Youth, Godsmack, Soundgarden, Weezer, Tina Turner, Mudvayne, Blues Traveler, Butthole Surfers, Insane Clown Posse, L7, Nonpoint, Devin the Dude, Iron & Wine, Dillinger Escape Plan, EOTO, Aesop Rock, The Books, Staind, AFI, Sleater-Kinney, KRS-One, The Black Lips, The Donnas, DRI, Stevie Ray Vaughan, Bun B, Tim and Eric Awesome Show, Great Job!, Os Mutantes, Foals, Tomahawk, Big Boi, Run the Jewels, Dresden Dolls, Warpaint, Del the Funky Homosapien, Man Man, Uh Huh Her, The Raveonettes, Pansy Division, Fantômas, Yelle, Prince Paul, OK Go, The Walkmen, Andy Dick, The Misfits, UK Subs, Death, Lucero, Man or Astroman?, Theophilus London, The Jesus Lizard, Daniel Johnston, Cracker, The Sword, MC Chris, Voodoo Glow Skulls, Mr. Greenfuzz, Peelander-Z, Toro y Moi, CocoRosie, Clara C, Omar Rodriguez Lopez, The Oh Sees, Yann Tiersen, Anamanaguchi, The Drums, 30 Foot Fall, Strife, Murder City Devils, Mindscape, The Fierce Goodbye, and hundreds of other now nationally recognized rock, country, hip-hop, and blues artists have all had their turn on the stages of Fitzgerald's. Several successful Texas bands such as Blue October, Waterparks, Canvas, Ian Moore, Johnny Goudie, SouthFM, Nothing Sacred, and Vallejo played their early shows at Fitzgerald's.
