= Purson (band) =

English psychedelic rock band

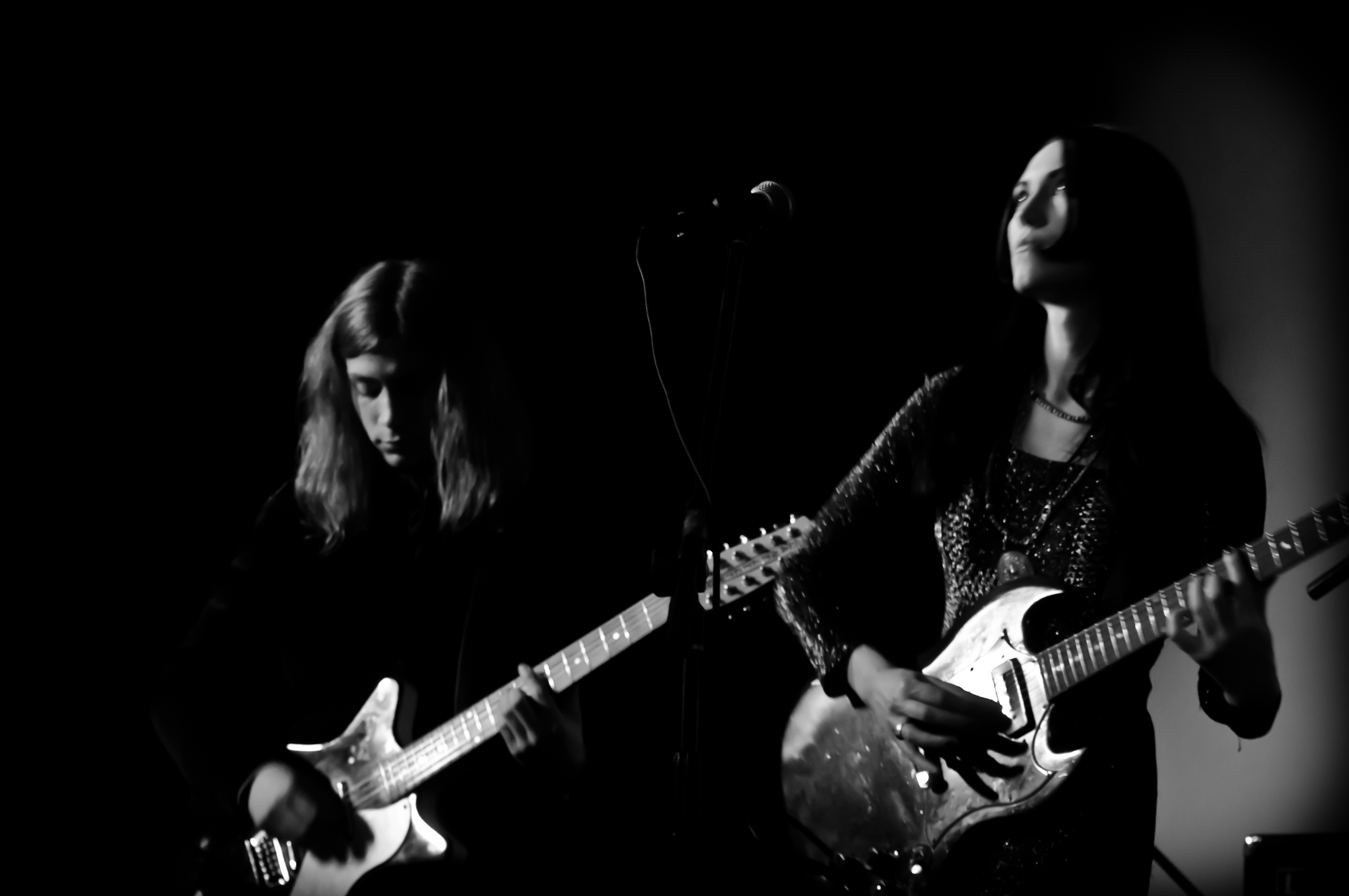
- Rosalie Cunningham and George Hudson in 2012

Background information
- Origin: London, England
- Genres: Psychedelic rock; progressive rock; stoner rock; occult rock
- Years active: 2011–2017
- Past members: Rosalie Cunningham; George Hudson; Samuel Shove; Justin Smith; Raphaël Mura

Purson were an English psychedelic rock band from London, England, founded by Rosalie Cunningham. Purson formed after Cunningham disbanded her previous project Ipso Facto. They were signed with Spinefarm. Cunningham described their sound as "vaudeville carny psych".

== Career ==
The band name has its origins in demonology, in which Purson is one of the kings of Hell. Cunningham wanted to name the band after a god. After not finding any god-like names that they liked, they searched in the names of demons or devils.

Their first single "Rocking Horse" was released on 1 March 2012.

Purson's debut album titled The Circle and the Blue Door was released on 29 April 2013 to general and critical acclaim. The title was inspired by an ex-boyfriend of Cunningham's who had a breakdown. The Circle and the Blue Door was something he talked about before he broke down. Spin called the album "an audacious entry into a current crop of retro-pop headbanger fare that should chill the marrow of fans". Virgin wrote "Long before the last track has played its final note you will already be planning your next visit to this dark yet enchanting musical world. 'The Circle & The Blue Door' is thoroughly addictive listening".

Just before their first single release, the band performed live in session for Marc Riley on BBC Radio 6 Music in January 2012. They returned to the show in March 2013 and December 2013, live from Maida Vale studios. During the show the band discussed plans to record a second album in 2014. Instead of a full album, this project materialised as an EP entitled "In The Meantime".

In April 2016, the full-length album "Desire's Magic Theatre" was released, with Cunningham playing most of the instruments herself with the exception of drums. The full band did however continue to back Cunningham for live appearances to promote the album.

Purson appeared at the 2012 edition of Roadburn Festival.

Purson supported Kiss on their 2014 edition of the Kiss Kruise.. Purson have also performed alongside label mates Uncle Acid & the Deadbeats, Electric Wizard, Blood Ceremony, Comus, Pentagram as well as neo-psychedelia bands such as Toy and Temples.

Purson toured the US extensively with Ghost on their Black to the Future US 2015 tour.

On 21 April 2017 Purson released the farewell single "Chocolate Money" and announced their split.

== Awards and accolades ==
Purson were voted Best New Band and Best Debut Album of 2013 in Terrorizer magazine's yearly readers poll as well as ranking The Circle And The Blue Door 11th in their critics choice of the best albums of 2013. The Circle And The Blue Door ranked number 15 on Metal Hammer magazine's best 50 Albums 2013. Purson were also Nominated for Best New Band in Classic Rock's 2014 Rock Roll Of Honour held in Los Angeles In 2015, they won the Vanguard award (for acts who deserve wider recognition) at the Progressive Music Awards in London.

== Discography ==
Singles

- "Rocking Horse" / "Twos and Ones" (Rise Above), March 2012
- "Leaning on a Bear" / "Let Bloom" (Rise Above), February 2013
- "The Contract" / "Blueprints of the Dream" (Rise Above), September 2013
- "Electric Landlady" (Spinefarm), September 2015
- "Chocolate Money" (Spinefarm), April 2017

EPs

- Rocking Horse - EP (Rise Above), April 2012
- In the Meantime... (Machine Elf), November 2014

Albums

- The Circle and the Blue Door (Rise Above/Metal Blade), April 2013
- Desire's Magic Theatre (Spinefarm Records), April 2016
