= Royal Thunder =

American hard rock band

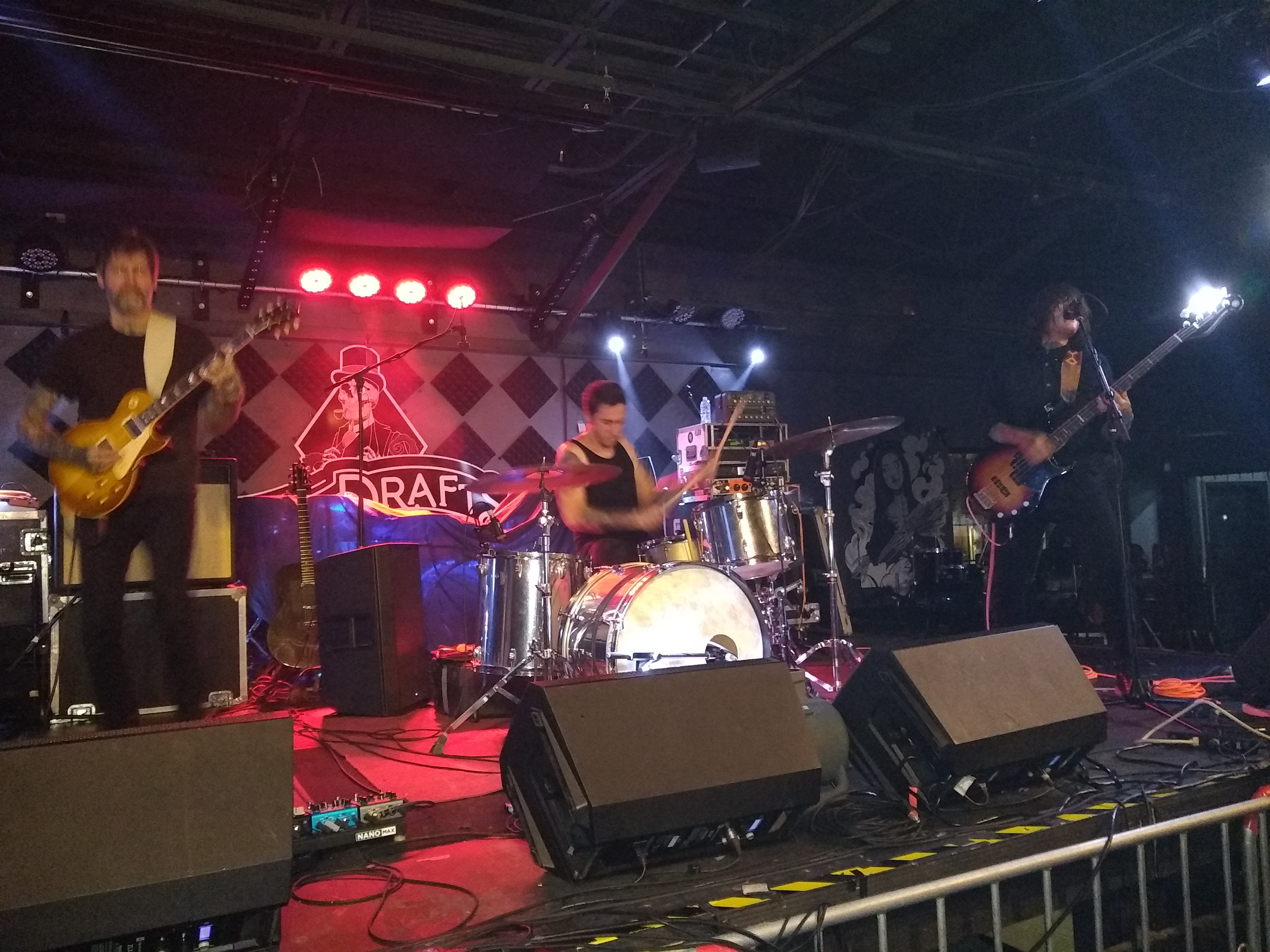
- Royal Thunder performing in Mechanicsburg, PA, July 2023

Background information
- Origin: Atlanta, Georgia, United States
- Genres: Hard rock, psychedelic rock, stoner rock, occult rock
- Years active: 2004–present
- Labels: Relapse, Spinefarm
- Members: Mlny Parsonz; Josh Weaver; Evan Diprima
- Past members: Jesse Stuber; Lee Smith; Will Fiore; Josh Coleman

Royal Thunder is an American rock band from Atlanta, Georgia, founded in 2004 by guitarist Josh Weaver. Their style of hard rock takes its primary influences from classic rock and 1990s grunge with elements of progressive rock and psychedelic rock. Rolling Stone has described the band as "a bit like an alternate universe where Janis Joplin fronted Led Zeppelin." Their most recent album, Rebuilding the Mountain, was released in June 2023.

== Biography ==
After forming in 2004 with Weaver on guitar, Mlny Parsonz on vocals and bass, and Jesse Stuber on drums, Royal Thunder self-released a self-titled EP in 2009, after which the band was signed to Relapse Records. Relapse released their first full-length album CVI in 2012, featuring new rhythm guitarist Josh Coleman. In a review of the album, AllMusic noted the band's unique sound combining the heavy side of 90s grunge, classic hard rock, and alternative rock. Stuber left the band and was replaced by Lee Smith, who had played on one track on CVI. Smith was soon replaced on drums by Evan DiPrima, and Coleman was replaced by guitarist Will Fiore, forming a lineup that would remain intact for the next six years.

Royal Thunder released the album Crooked Doors in 2015. The album was themed around the breakup of the marriage between Parsonz and Weaver, with lyrics that critics compared to the Fleetwood Mac album Rumours. Some of the lyrics also described Parsonz's membership in a religious cult. Crooked Doors was noted as being more varied and progressive than its predecessor, while Parsonz's bluesy, waling voice and harrowing lyrics gained the attention of critics.

The band's third album Wick was released in 2017 by Spinefarm Records. In a review of the album, Rolling Stone praised Parsonz for her "raspy, powerful wail [which] is one of the most moving voices in rock right now," and noted that the band "has found its sound." Classic Rock Magazine described the album as the band's most powerful yet, with "a shifting musical bedrock over which Parsonz... delivers the kind of vocals – sometimes armoured, sometimes vulnerable – that can emote, transport and illuminate in equal measure." Drummer Evan DiPrima left the band on good terms in 2018 and was temporarily replaced by Kent Aberle; DiPrima returned in 2020. Guitarist Will Fiore then departed and the band has continued as a trio. The band's fourth album Rebuilding the Mountain was released on June 16, 2023.

== Discography ==
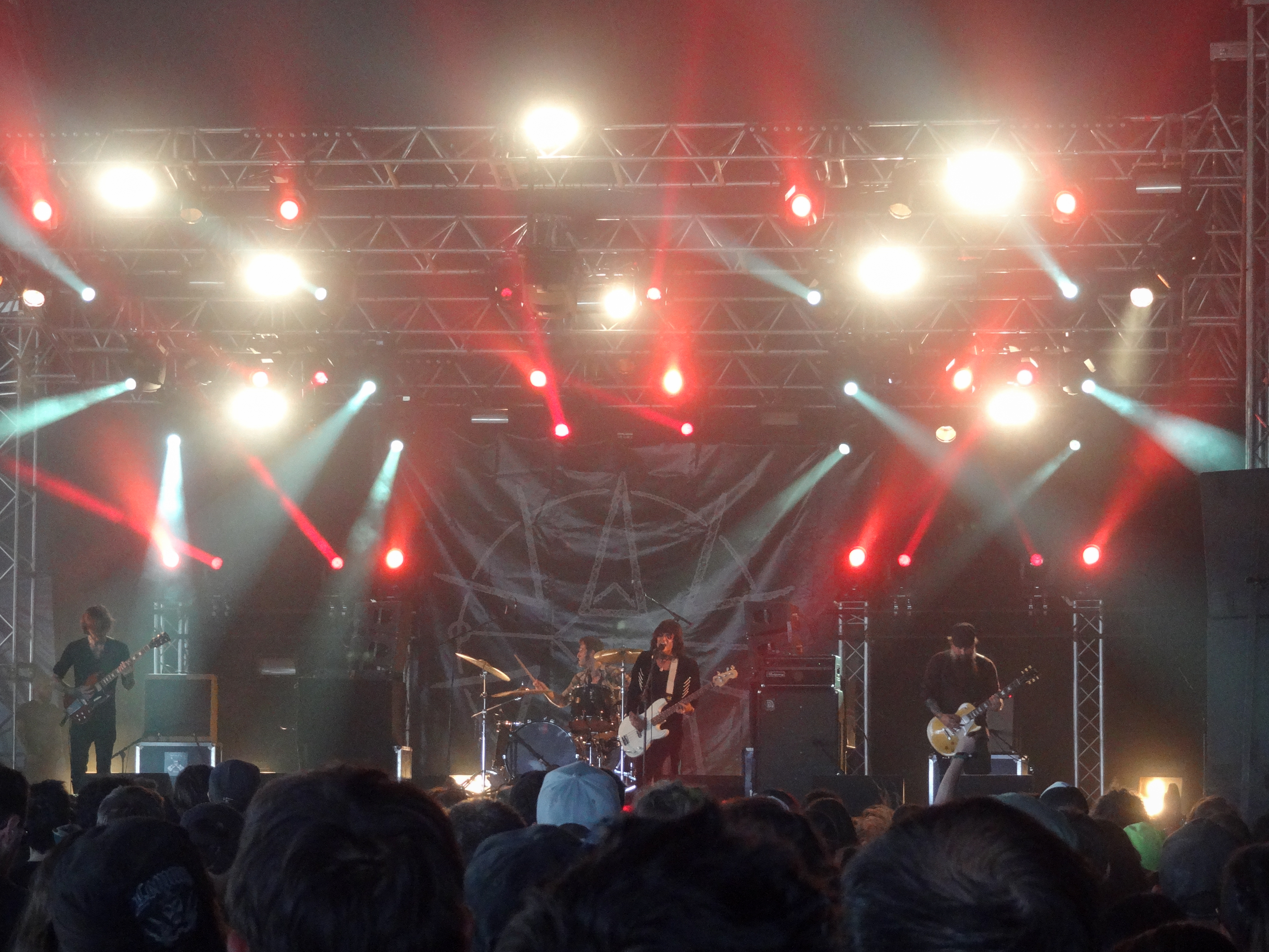
Royal Thunder performing at Hellfest 2014

=== Studio albums ===
- CVI (2012)
- Crooked Doors (2015)
- Wick (2017)
- Rebuilding the Mountain (2023)

=== EPs ===
- Royal Thunder (2009)
- CVI: A (2013)

=== Singles ===
- "Whispering World" (Acoustic) (2013)
