= The Sword =

American heavy metal band

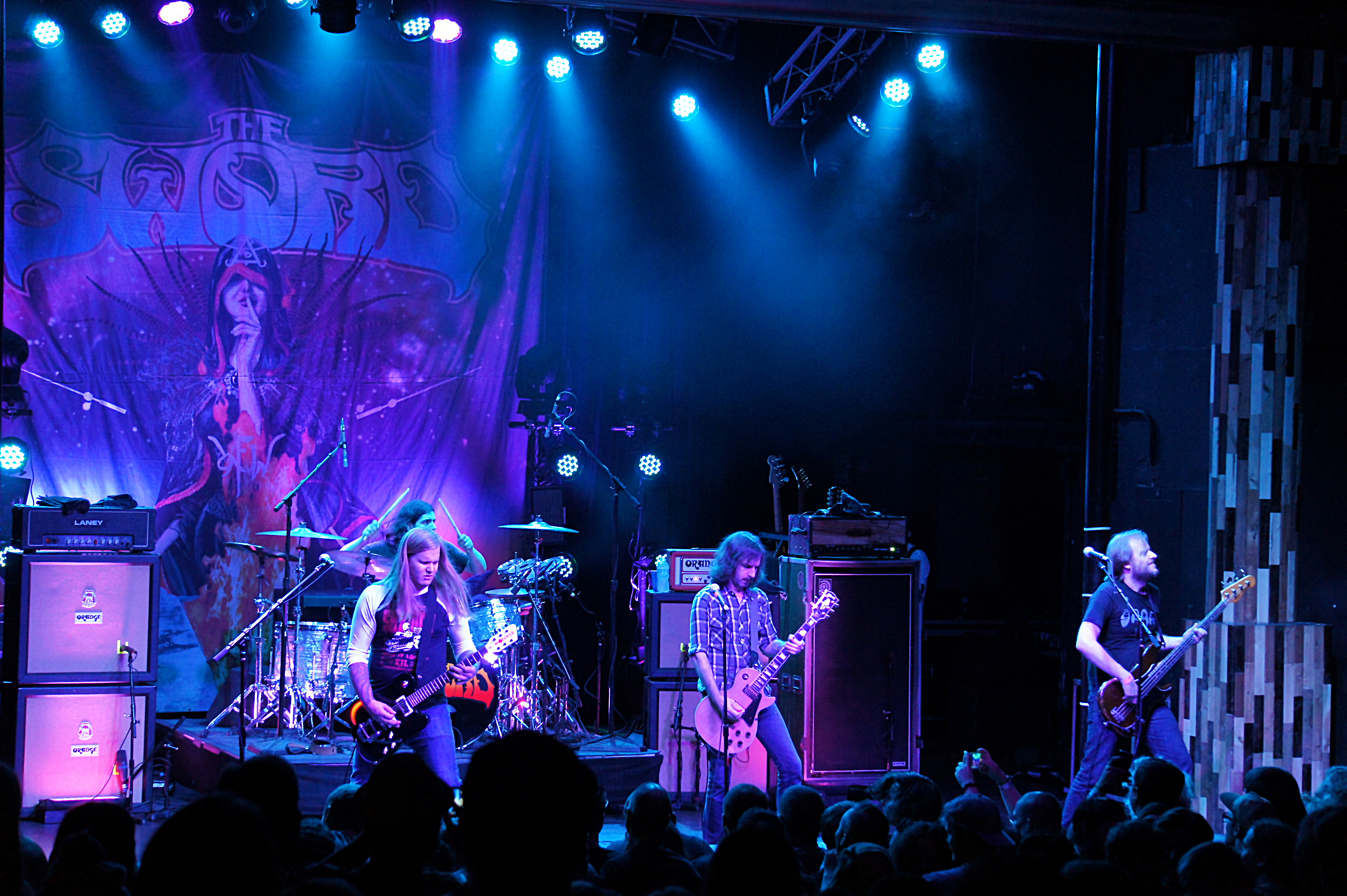
- The Sword in 2013; left to right: Kyle Shutt, Jimmy Vela (back), John D. Cronise, Bryan Richie

Background information
- Origin: Austin, Texas, U.S.
- Genres: Heavy metal; hard rock; doom metal; stoner rock
- Years active: 2003–2022; 2024–present
- Labels: Razor & Tie; Kemado
- Members: John D. Cronise; Kyle Shutt; Bryan Richie; Santiago "Jimmy" Vela III
- Past members: Trivett Wingo
- Website: theswordofficial.com

The Sword is an American heavy metal band from Austin, Texas. Formed in 2003, the band is composed of vocalist and guitarist John D. Cronise, guitarist Kyle Shutt, bassist Bryan Richie and drummer Santiago "Jimmy" Vela III for most of its tenure. Originally signed to Kemado Records, the group released their debut album Age of Winters in 2006, the material for which had been largely written by Cronise (who also produced the album) prior to the band's formation. Gods of the Earth (which was also produced by the band's frontman) was released two years later, giving the group its first entry on the US Billboard 200 chart when it reached number 102.

In 2010, the band released Warp Riders, a concept album centered on an original science fiction narrative written primarily by Cronise, which marked the first time the group had enlisted an external producer in Matt Bayles. Original drummer Trivett Wingo left the group later in the year and was replaced briefly by Kevin Fender, before Vela joined in late 2011. After signing with Razor & Tie in early 2012, the group released its fourth album Apocryphon later in the year, which was promoted worldwide on the Apocryphon Tour. The band's fifth studio album High Country was released in August 2015, followed by their sixth Used Future in March 2018. The Sword disbanded in October 2022 but have since regrouped and begun touring again.

During its early career, the Sword was categorized primarily as a doom metal band, with the group's members citing bands including Black Sabbath and Sleep as influences. In more recent years, the group's style had generally been classified as hard rock or stoner rock. The Sword has toured with a wide range of fellow rock and metal artists since its formation, including Metallica, Lamb of God and Clutch, and in recent years also headlined its own tours.

== History ==
=== 2003–09: Formation, early years and first releases ===
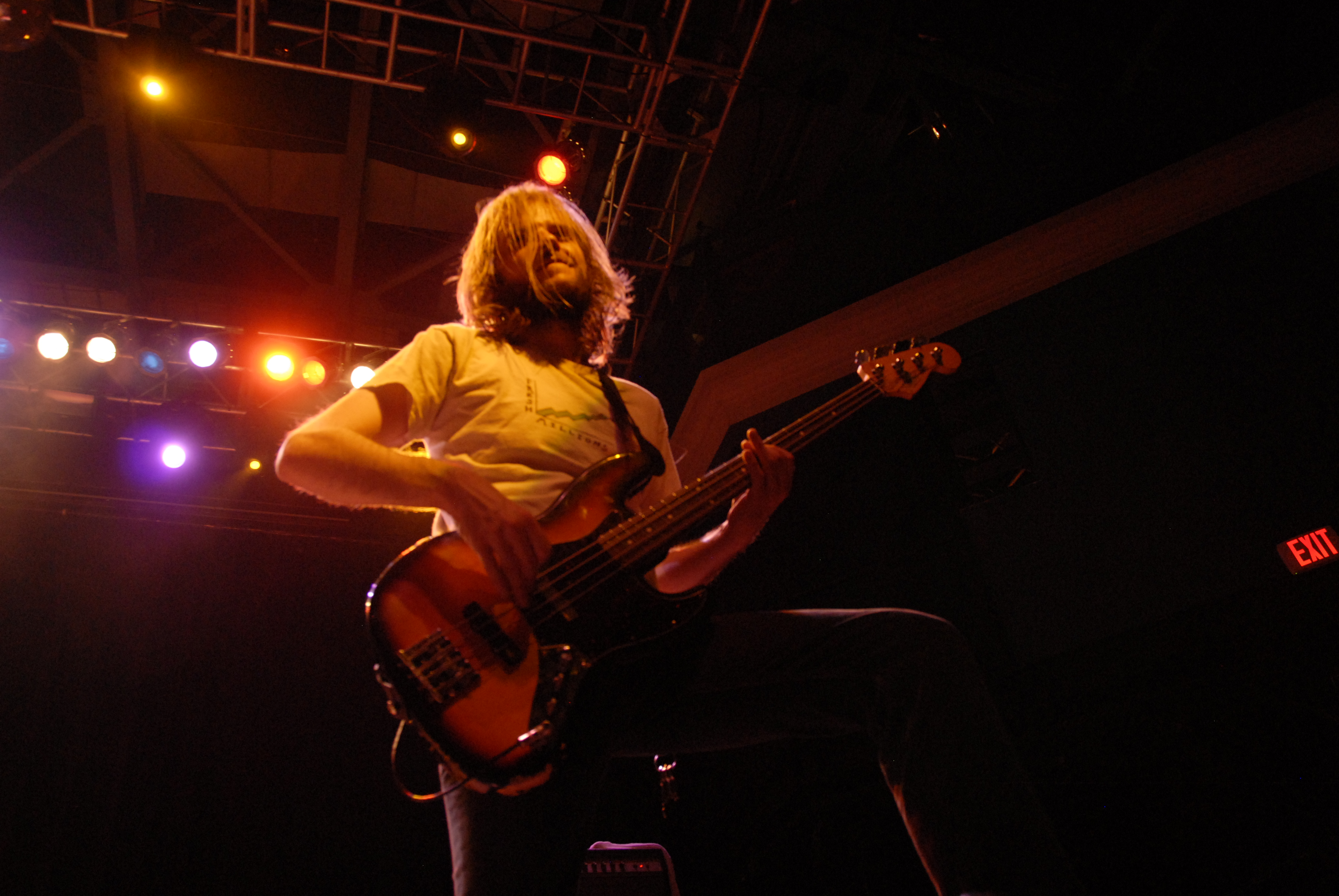
Bryan Richie was the last member to join the Sword, completing the original four-piece lineup of the band in 2004.

After writing and recording music on his own for "a few years", vocalist and guitarist John D. "J.D." Cronise formed The Sword in 2003 with guitarist Kyle Shutt and drummer Trivett Wingo. Speaking about choosing the band's name, Cronise claims that he researched the moniker first and found it "unbelievable" that it hadn't already been used; however, two other bands did already have the name Sword, including a Canadian heavy metal band, and the frontman states he "narrowly escaped litigation hell" before the Sword was finalised. The trio played their first show together on June 19, 2003, at the Beerland in Austin, and released their first demo Age of Winters before the end of the year. Bassist Bryan Richie completed the four-piece lineup in early 2004. Prior to the formation of the Sword, Cronise and Wingo had performed together in the group Ultimate Dragons in Richmond, Virginia, while Shutt and Richie had worked with multiple bands in Texas "united by a love of Led Zeppelin". Cronise had also performed with a local band called Those Peabodys, but left as he felt he "needed to do something heavier". After their first live performance together as a four-piece at Austin's Sound on Sound Records on March 17, 2004, the band released a self-titled second demo, which was followed the next year by an extended play (EP) entitled Freya.

After performing at the 2005 South by Southwest festival, the Sword was signed by New York-based record label Kemado Records, following a recommendation by Lamb of God guitarist Mark Morton. The band released its debut album Age of Winters in February 2006, for which much of the material had been written by Cronise before the band's formation and featured on the band's early demos. In support of the album the band toured throughout 2006 and 2007, with support acts including Lacuna Coil and Trivium in the United States, Nebula and Clutch in Europe, and Lamb of God in Japan. In November 2006 a cover version of the song "Freya" was featured as a playable track on the video game Guitar Hero II, and the original track was later released as the band's first single in September 2007. Age of Winters did not chart, but received widely positive reviews from critics including AllMusic's Eduardo Rivadavia, who described the album as "remarkably well-balanced and almost suspiciously immediate".

In June 2007, the band contributed a new song, "Under the Boughs" (which was later included on their second album), to the Kemado compilation Invaders. The group also released a split EP with Swedish doom metal band Witchcraft the same month, contributing new track "Sea of Spears" and a cover of Led Zeppelin's "Immigrant Song" to the record. Gods of the Earth was the band's second album, released on April 1, 2008. The album, which is much more of a collaborative writing effort than its predecessor, provided the band with its first Billboard 200 chart entry, reaching number 102. In support of the album, the band completed the Gods of the Earth Tour supported by artists such as Machine Head, Lamb of God and Clutch; the quartet also supported heavy metal veterans Metallica on their 2008 European Vacation Tour in July, and returned as the opening act for a number of legs on their 2009 World Magnetic Tour. A two-disc box set containing the band's first two albums Age of Winters and Gods of the Earth was released on November 25, 2008, and the song "The Black River" from Gods of the Earth was later included on the 2009 video game Guitar Hero: Metallica. The band's music was also featured in the 2009 films Jennifer's Body ("Celestial Crown") and Horsemen ("Maiden, Mother & Crone"), and in March 2009, the Sword won two local music awards: the High Times Doobie Award and the Austin Music Award for Best Metal Artist.

=== 2009–12: Warp Riders and two drummer changes ===
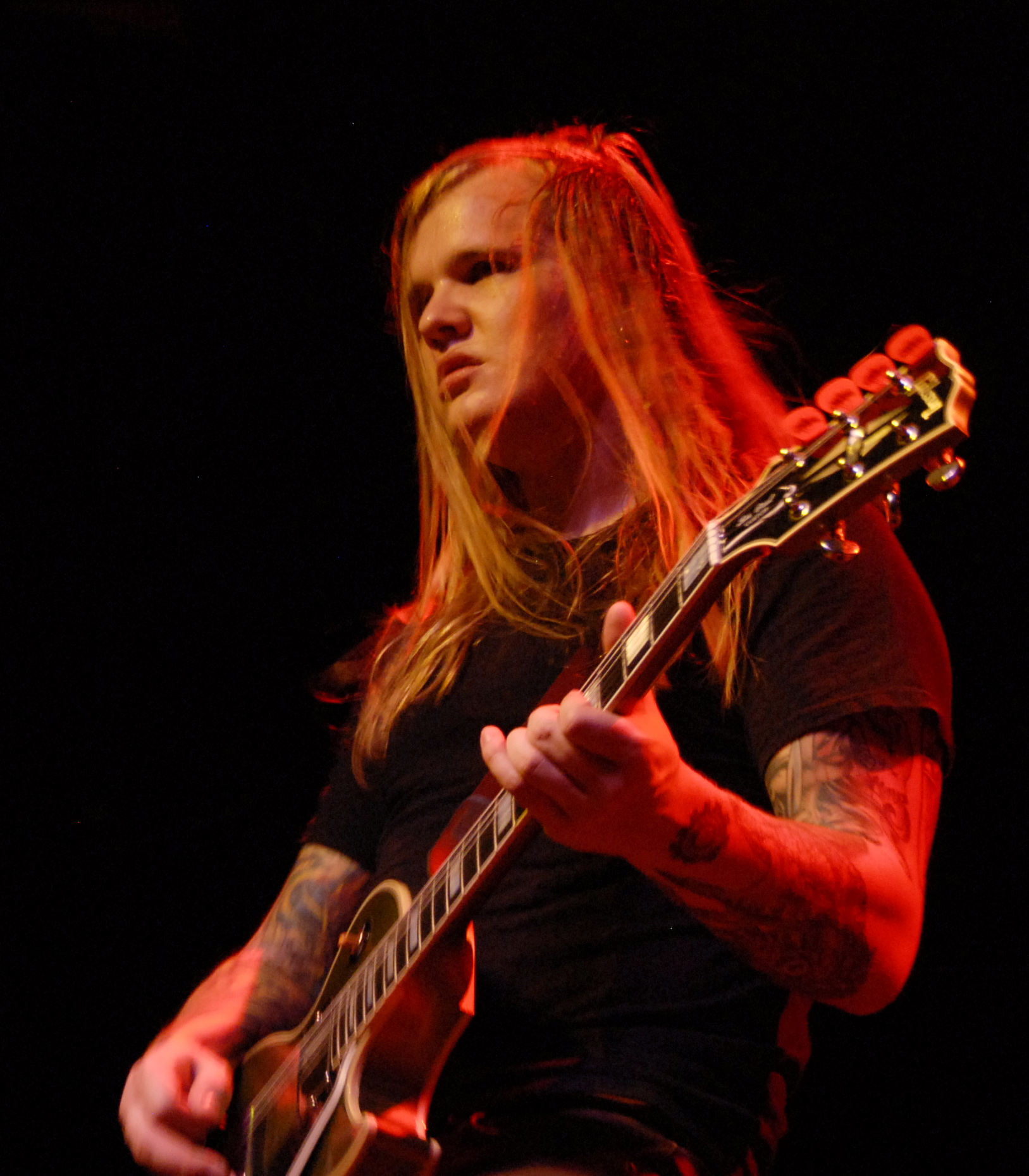
Kyle Shutt was the only band member besides Cronise credited for songwriting on Warp Riders.

The Sword spent the rest of 2009 writing material for their third album, which took the form of "a concept album centered around an original science fiction narrative", and had more of a hard rock sound than the band's previous releases. Some of the new songs were debuted at the 2009 Fun Fun Fun Fest in November, and were also played on "a short regional tour showcasing the new songs" in January. Recording for the follow-up to Gods of the Earth began in February 2010 with Matt Bayles, marking the first time the band had worked with an external producer or engineer (the first two albums were produced by Cronise and engineered by Richie). Recording of the album, titled Warp Riders, was completed by April.

In May, the band contributed to a split release for the second time, covering Thin Lizzy's "Cold Sweat" for a Volcom Entertainment Vinyl Club release with Year Long Disaster, who covered the Sword's own track "Maiden, Mother & Crone". In July, Warp Riders lead single "Tres Brujas" was released as a digital download, and a live EP entitled iTunes Festival: London 2010 (recorded at the iTunes Festival in London on July 3) was also released as an iTunes-exclusive download. Released in August, Warp Riders surpassed the commercial performance of Gods of the Earth when it debuted at number 47 on the Billboard 200, selling almost 9,000 copies in the first week of its release. The band supported Metallica again on a series of September tour dates in Australia, New Zealand and Japan as warm-up for their own Warp Riders Tour, which began the following month.

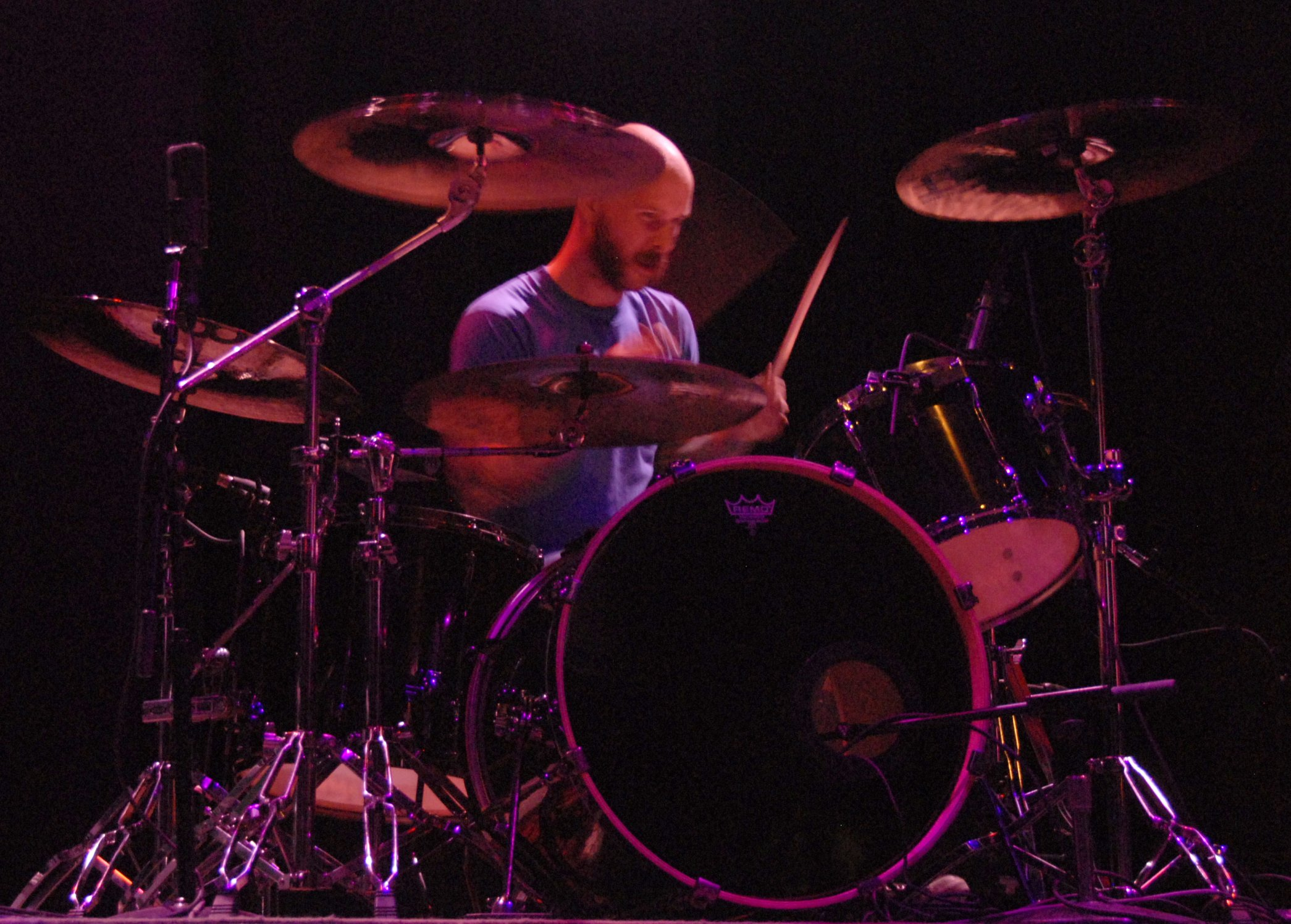
Kevin Fender replaced founding member Trivett Wingo in 2010 and was the touring drummer for the Sword until 2011.

Five shows into the opening North American leg of the Warp Riders Tour, the Sword was forced to postpone all dates due to the departure of drummer Trivett Wingo. Explaining his decision to leave, Wingo commented that he felt "physically and emotionally unable to continue on as part of [the band]", and later revealed that he had predicted he would eventually leave the band for "probably a couple of years", justifying his decision by explaining that "my level of anxiety pertaining to being on tour got to the point where medication was not the answer." Upon Wingo's departure from the Sword, the remaining members of the band released the following statement:

We wish Trivett nothing but the best, and it is with heavy hearts that we bid him farewell ... We wish he could continue the adventure with us, but we understand that the life of a touring musician is not for everyone ... The show must go on, though, and will be back on the road as soon as humanly possible.

For the later rescheduled tour dates, Austin-based drummer Kevin Fender, formerly of Employer, Employee, was enlisted as a temporary touring member. The second single from Warp Riders, "(The Night the Sky Cried) Tears of Fire", was released as a limited edition picture disc at the beginning of November backed with previously unreleased B-side "Farstar", and later in the month the video for "Lawless Lands" – part two of the Warp Riders trilogy – was released online. A number of European dates were rescheduled for May 2011, and the third and final Warp Riders music video "Night City" was released in March. The band toured with Kyuss Lives! and MonstrO in the summer of 2011. In October 2011, Fender was replaced with Santiago "Jimmy" Vela III, and the band saw out the rest of 2011 touring in the US. Guitarist Kyle Shutt later spoke about the drummer changes in an interview in 2012, claiming that Wingo "took a shit all over [the band]" when he left and that Fender was chosen as he already knew how to play the group's songs.

=== 2012–17: Apocryphon, High Country and more ===
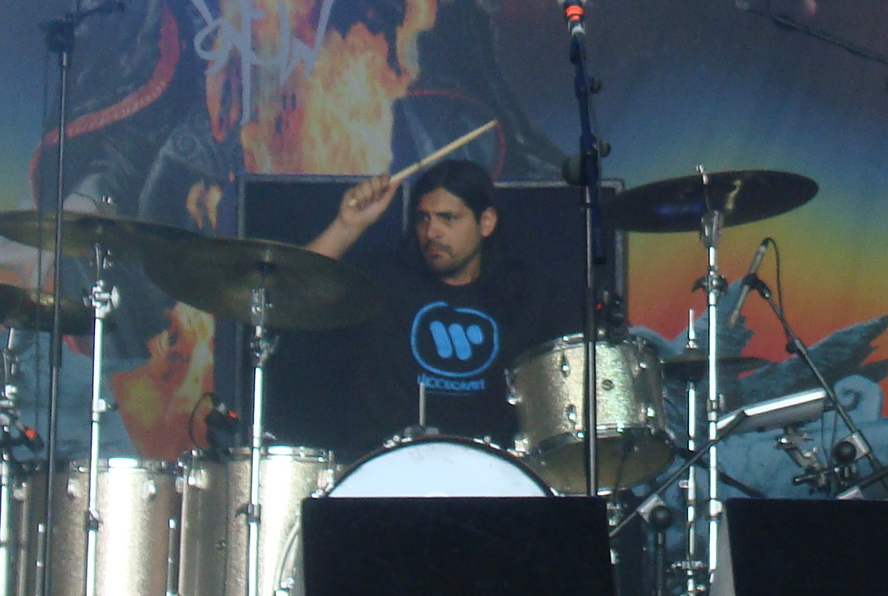
Jimmy Vela joined the band in 2011 and performed on 2012's Apocryphon.

In March 2012, it was announced that the Sword had signed a worldwide deal with record label Razor & Tie, with plans for a fourth album starting with recording in June and a projected late-2012 release. In May the band released the single "Hammer of Heaven", a song originally recorded in 2003 for the Age of Winters demo and later submitted for inclusion on the soundtrack to the film The Avengers. In the run-up to the recording of their next album, the group only played a few shows in 2012, most notably the Metallica-curated festival Orion Music + More in June, where the band was introduced by Metallica bassist Robert Trujillo. Working with producer J. Robbins, the group recorded the follow-up to Warp Riders at Magpie Cage Studios in Baltimore, Maryland between June and July 2012. The resulting album, Apocryphon, was released in October 2012 and debuted at number 17 on the Billboard 200 albums chart, selling over 16,000 copies in its first week and providing a new chart record for the band. The promotional Apocryphon Tour commenced the following week in the US, and continued across the world throughout the rest of 2012 and 2013.

The years 2012 and 2013 also saw the Sword expanding into business ventures outside of music, beginning in September 2012 with the release of the band's own brand of hot sauce called Tears of Fire. The sauce, which is made with the 'ghost pepper' Bhut Jolokia, was first announced and revealed on the Travel Channel series Anthony Bourdain: No Reservations on September 3, before going on sale to the public the following day. This was followed in October by the release of the band's first line of beer, Winter's Wolves Beer, produced by Baltimore, Maryland-based brewery Oliver Ales, and in July 2013 by a second line of beer, Iron Swan Ale, produced by Texas-based Real Ale Brewing Co. A series of release shows for "Iron Swan Ale" were held in Texas. In 2014, "The Hidden Masters" and "Arcane Montane" were released together as a set of 7" vinyl singles, with electronic remixes of each song by artist Dylan C (Dylan Cameron). Later that year the band collaborated with BMX bike company Subrosa Brand on their own branded BMX model, featuring artwork by Apocryphon artist J. H. Williams III and named "The Stormwitch" after the song, "Eyes of the Stormwitch".

Writing for the Sword's fifth album began in late 2014, which was then recorded between March and April 2015 at Church House Studio in Austin Texas with former Grupo Fantasma guitarist Adrian Quesada as producer. Prior to starting recording, the group also embarked on a short tour between March 11 and 14, visiting four cities in Louisiana, Tennessee and Oklahoma. High Country was released on August 21 and the High Country Tour began in Europe on the same day. The album was the band's first to chart outside of the US and UK, reaching number 74 on the Australian Albums Chart and number 91 on the German Albums Chart. It reached number 30 on the US Billboard 200. In April 2016, the band released a cover of Son House's "John the Revelator" for Record Store Day. In September, a collection of acoustic recordings of High Country songs was released as Low Country. The following May saw the release of the group's first live album, Greetings From..., recorded during late 2016 on tour with Opeth.

=== 2017–ongoing: Used Future, hiatus and return ===
The Sword began recording its sixth studio album Used Future in October 2017, working in Portland, Oregon with producer Tucker Martine. "Deadly Nightshade" was released as the lead single from the album on January 26, 2018, followed by "Twilight Sunrise" the following month. The album was released on March 23, 2018, and reached number 104 on the Billboard 200 – the lowest position for a studio release in the band's career since Age of Winters failed to chart. On September 6, 2018, the band announced via Facebook that they would be going on hiatus, cancelling a subsequent Australian tour.

In February 2020, funk metal band Primus announced a tour in tribute to progressive rock band Rush, which featured the Sword alongside Wolfmother and Battles as support.

On October 20, 2022, John D. Cronise announced the band was splitting up after 19 years.

On June 27, 2024, the band announced they would reunite for a one-off on November 3 at the Levitation Festival.

On November 13, 2024, the band released a single covering "Locomotive Breath" by Jethro Tull. Two weeks later, the band announced a New Year's Eve show in Austin, Texas.

On February 4, 2025, the band announced its return through the two-date event The Return (April 10 and 11) in Texas, featuring songs from its album Warp Riders.

On March 21, 2025, it announced a tour for the 15th anniversary of Warp Riders, issuing a 15th Year Anniversary Edition of the album. Returning to Europe as a first part of their Tour from June 19, 2025, to June 28, 2025. The American Tour was announced on April 30, 2025, which started on August 17, and ended on August 30. The second part started on September 27, and ended on October 26, 2025.

The Band played at the Levitation Festival on September 26.

On September 19, 2025, The Sword announced a return to Europe, being headlined at the Desertfest Berlin, 2026 edition. This later confirmed a new European Tour of May, 2026. The "European Tour 2026" will start on May 9 and end on May 23, 2026, together with the band Earthless.

== Musical style, influences and lyrical themes ==
The Sword has been categorised as doom metal and identified as an example of the 'classic metal' movement of stoner rock artists influenced by early metal bands such as Black Sabbath, Led Zeppelin, Blue Cheer, and Judas Priest. With the release of Warp Riders, members of the band acknowledged that fans with a more "narrow-minded" view of heavy metal may feel alienated by stylistic changes. Eduardo Rivadavia of AllMusic described the band on Age of Winters as being "at the forefront of … the 'heritage' or 'retro metal' movement," comparing their style to that of heavy metal veterans Black Sabbath and vocalist Cronise to Ozzy Osbourne. Rolling Stone has also likened the band to Sabbath. Matt Kiser of CMJ described The Sword as a hybrid of Scandinavian Viking metal with an "old-fashioned audio assault cranked to 11." He said that Gods of the Earth uses a touch of Black Sabbath and the Melvins to create the "aural equivalent of playing Zelda on your beat-up NES while watching The Lord of the Rings and reading Dune simultaneously."

While every member of the band contributes to the musical compositions, Cronise is the primary writer of the band's lyrics. He often uses Norse mythology as a topic in his lyrics, notably in the song "Freya", but cites literature as his main influence, identifying such authors as George R. R. Martin, Robert E. Howard, H. P. Lovecraft and Arthur C. Clarke as inspirations. On Warp Riders, Cronise was again credited for writing all the lyrics, and only guitarist Kyle Shutt was added to the credits for the musical compositions.

The band has cited Black Sabbath as a major influence, in addition to doom trio Sleep, sludge band the Melvins, thrash veterans Slayer, and heavy metal icons Iron Maiden and Deep Purple, among others. The band's guitarists, in discussions of their musical influences, have identified 'classic' metal guitar players such as James Hetfield of Metallica, Pantera's Dimebag Darrell and Tony Iommi of Black Sabbath, and Cronise has also described Billy Gibbons (of ZZ Top) as a "huge influence." In an interview with entertainment newspaper The A.V. Club, Cronise also revealed that local metal band HRM, rock musician Bob Seger and R&B singer Michael Jackson have been influences on the Sword's sound.

== Band members ==
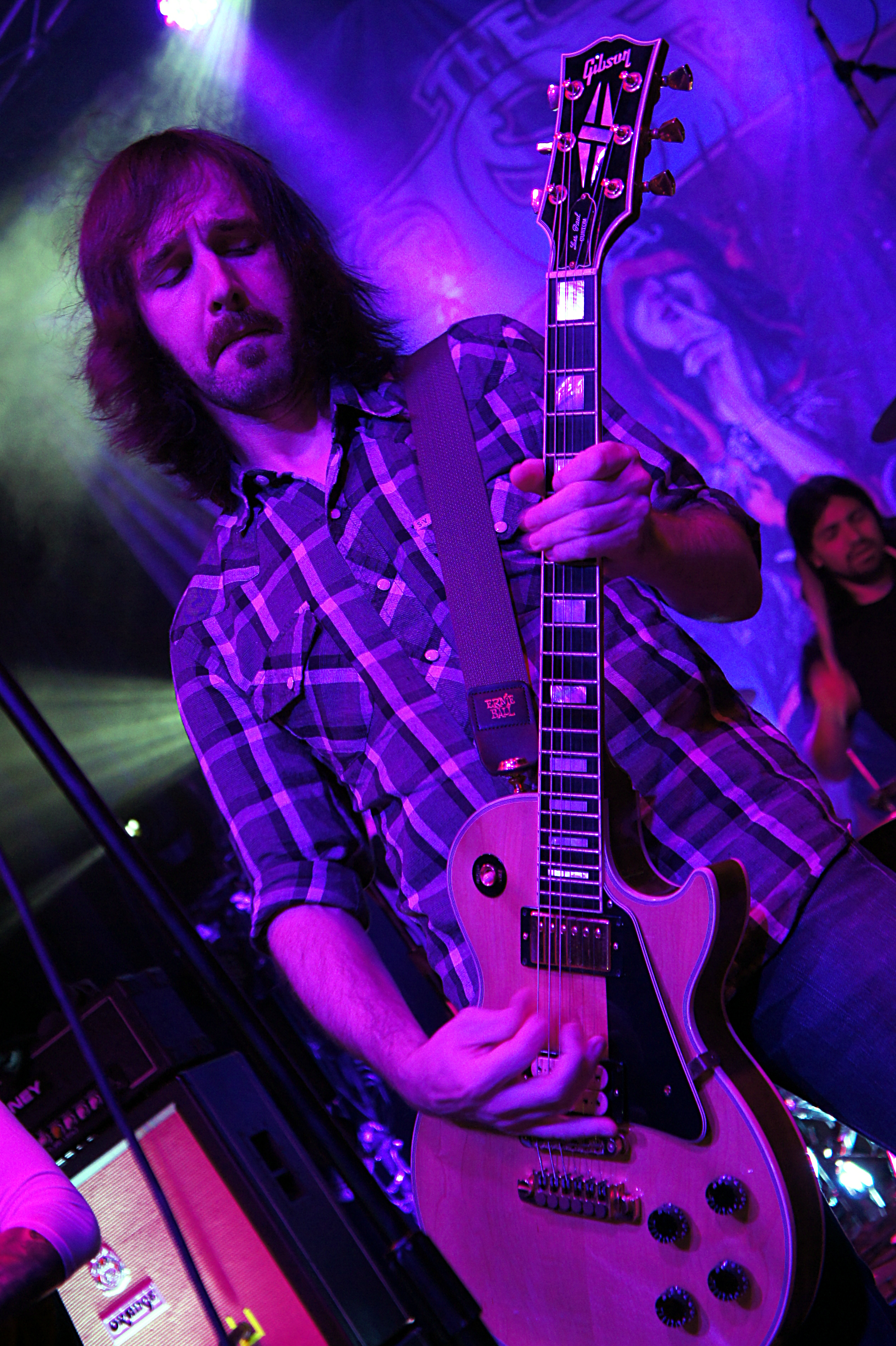
John D. Cronise

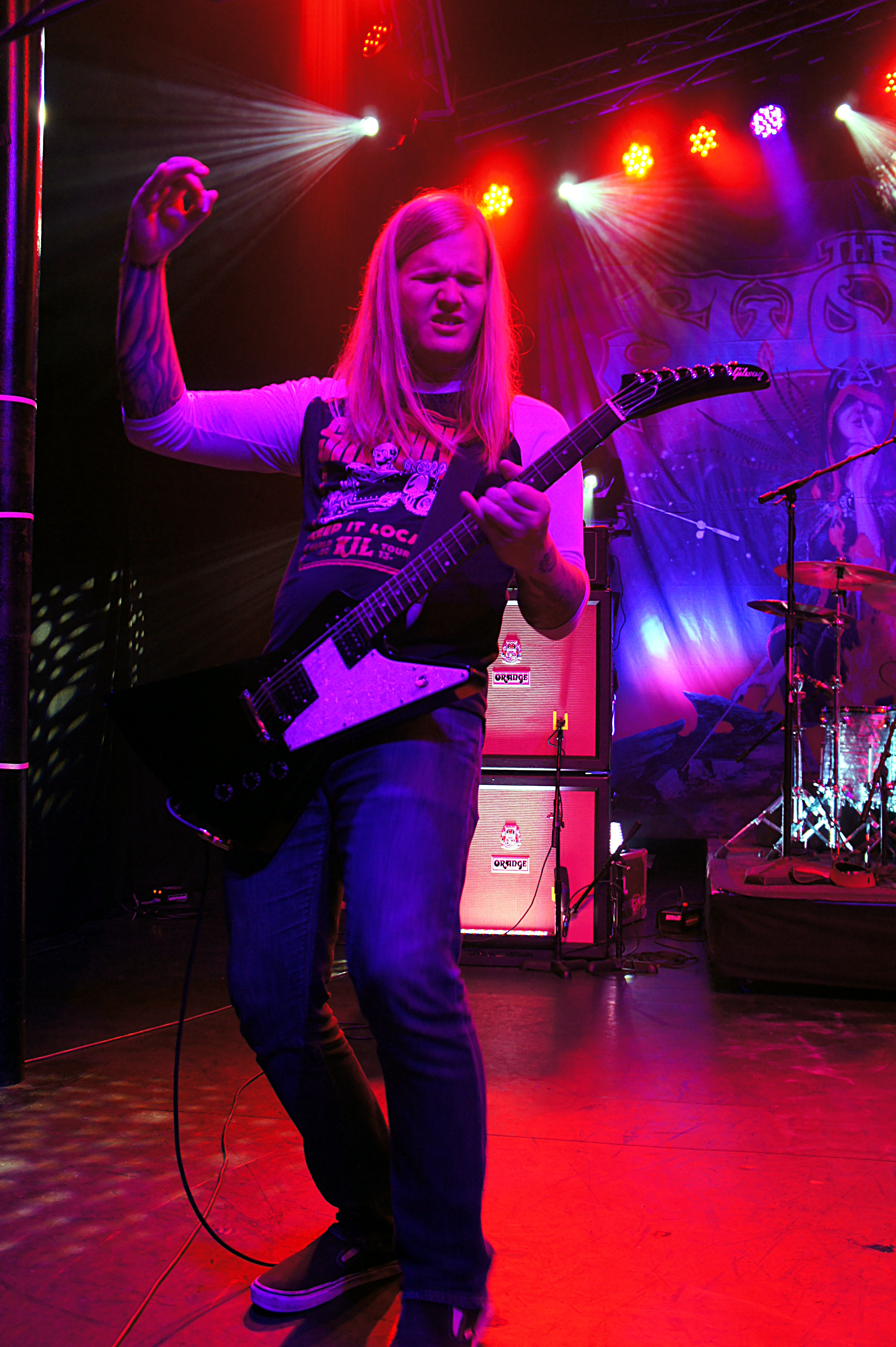
Kyle Shutt

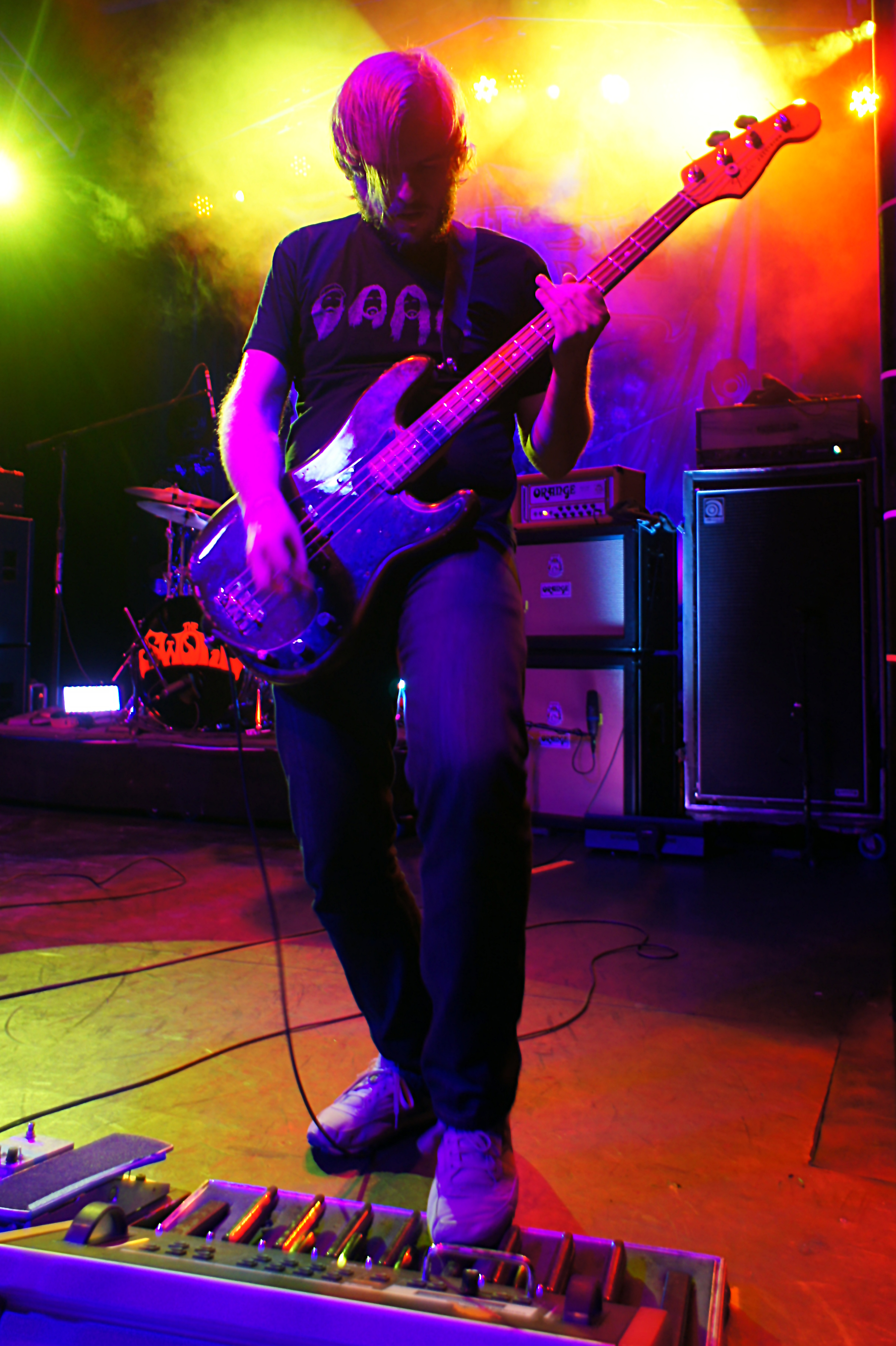
Bryan Richie

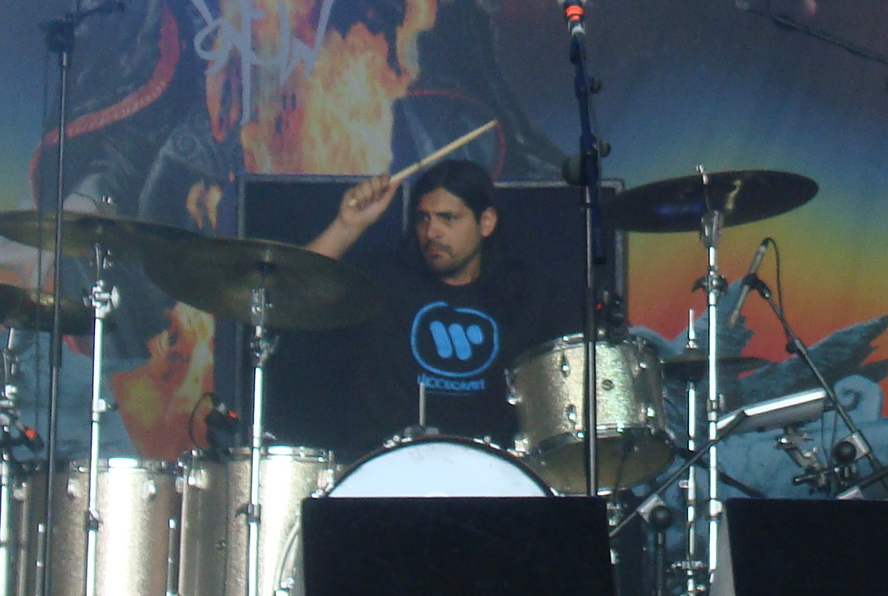
Santiago "Jimmy" Vela III

Current members

- John D. Cronise – lead vocals, rhythm guitar (2003–2022, 2024–present)
- Kyle Shutt – lead guitar, backing vocals (2003–2022, 2024–present)
- Bryan Richie – bass, keyboards, backing vocals (2004–2022, 2024–present)
- Santiago "Jimmy" Vela III – drums (2011–2022, 2024–present)

Former members

- Trivett Wingo – drums (2003–2010)

Former touring musicians

- Kevin Fender – drums (2010–2011)

== Discography ==
- Age of Winters (2006)
- Gods of the Earth (2008)
- Warp Riders (2010)
- Apocryphon (2012)
- High Country (2015)
- Used Future (2018)
