= Romance (band) =

British rock band

- Origin: London
- Genres: Rock, Cabaret Rock
- Years active: 2010 – 2016
- Label: Fiction Records
- Members: Jamie Lovatt; John Hartz-Wild; Harry King; Cillian Sheil
- Website: www.isthisromance.com

Romance were a four-piece live rock band from London that formed in 2010. The band went on to support The Cult on their UK tour and were signed to Universal subsidiary Fiction Records. The band consisted of Jamie Lovatt (Guitar and Vocals), Jon Hartz Wild (Guitar), Harry King (Bass), and Cillian Sheil (Drums).

The band went on to record their first album with Jason Perry. Original members Samantha Valentine and Alex Glover left the band after internal pressures, with drummer David Woods exiting after being struck with a back condition meaning he could no longer play.

On 22 February 2014, lead singer Jamie Lovatt appeared as an auditionee on The Voice UK, singing a cover of Everybody's Free (To Feel Good). After performing he stated that the band had been dropped by their record label but had been continuing to perform and write music. He joined Ricky's team for the next round and departed in the knock out stages to Chris Royal.

The band announced their dissolution on April 16, 2016 in a Facebook post simply reading "ROMANCE IS DEAD" and linking to vocalist Jamie Lovatt's page. As of late 2016 Lovatt's Facebook page also ceased activity.
