= Karma to Burn / Sons of Alpha Centauri =

Karma to Burn / Sons of Alpha Centauri: The Definitive 7″ Trilogy!

Compilation album by Karma to Burn and Sons of Alpha Centauri
- Released: July 4, 2017
- Recorded: 2009–2015
- Genres: Stoner rock; space rock; post-rock
- Length: 27:44
- Labels: H42; Kitchen Dweller

Karma to Burn chronology
Mountain Czar (2016)	Karma to Burn / Sons of Alpha Centauri (2017)	Thee Rabbit Hole (2021)

Sons of Alpha Centauri chronology
WaterWays/Sons of Alpha Centauri/Hotel Wrecking City Traders (2012)	Karma to Burn / Sons of Alpha Centauri (2017)	Continuum (2018)

Karma to Burn / Sons of Alpha Centauri: The Definitive 7″ Trilogy! is a compilation album featuring a series of split singles released by American rock band Karma to Burn and English rock band Sons of Alpha Centauri (SOAC).

== Background ==
In 2007, Will Mecum of Karma to Burn travelled to the UK to work with SOAC and record three tracks under the moniker Alpha Cat. Four additional SOAC and four Treasure Cat tracks were recorded and, together with the Alpha Cat tracks, were included in the album Last Day of Summer, which was released on 7 October 2009 by Underdogma Records.

In 2009, Karma to Burn reformed and toured Europe extensively, with Sons of Alpha Centauri nominated as support for several shows, including the London performance at the Camden Underworld. Subsequent support roles followed for the band with Karma to Burn in 2010, 2012 and 2014.

== Releases ==
In 2010, Kitchen Dweller Records released the first Karma to Burn and Sons of Alpha Centauri split 7-inch vinyl, which was generally well received. The bands featured the track "Patty Hearst's Closet Mantra" from Karma to Burn on the release as "Fourteen", as well as an unreleased B-side entitled "65" by Sons of Alpha Centauri. On April 21, 2014, the second split 7-inch between the two bands, "Fifty Three/71", was released by H42 Records in 7 different colour variations. A limited clear vinyl Camden Underworld version was released for one night only for a co-headlining performance at the Camden Underworld in London on the 30 August 2014. The first pressing of the second release includes an ambient passage with an answering machine message from Karma to Burn's Will Mecum to Sons of Alpha Centauri regarding the possibility of the two bands working together. In April 2015, the third 7-inch collaboration vinyl, "Six/66", was released by H42 Records in multiple colours. A special edition was created for the 2015 London DesertFest, becoming the first of the London DesertFest 7-inch vinyl series. In 2015, H42 Records re-released the first vinyl originally released in 2010 as a second pressing.

On 4 July 2017, Karma to Burn / Sons of Alpha Centauri was released by H42 Records as a limited box set in a new color presentation of all three vinyls, together with a 28-page booklet and 7-inch vinyl of the Alpha Cat tracks.

=== Artwork ===
The artwork created is consistent across all of the releases and across the box set. Karma to Burn artwork was delivered by Alex von Wieding, who has been responsible for Karma to Burn's artwork since their 2009 reformation, including that for the albums Appalachian Incantation, V and Arch Stanton. The Sons of Alpha Centauri artwork for the 2010 release is landscape photography by the band done at the Kentish Flats Offshore Wind Farm near Whitstable, England.

== Track listing ==
Side A

All songs written and composed by Karma to Burn.

No.	Title	Length
1.	"Fourteen"	5:13
2.	"Fifty Three"	4:09
3.	"Six"	3:52
Total length:		13:14

Side AA

All songs written and composed by Sons of Alpha Centauri.

No.	Title	Length
1.	"65"	4:09
2.	"71"	4:48
3.	"66"	5:33
Total length:		14:30

== Personnel ==
Karma to Burn

- Will Mecum – guitar
- Rich Mullins – bass
- Evan Devine – drums

Sons of Alpha Centauri

- Blake – sound manipulation
- Stevie B. – drums
- Nick Hannon – bass
- Marlon King – guitar
