= WaterWays/Sons of Alpha Centauri/Hotel Wrecking City Traders =

- North American cover

EP by WaterWays, Sons of Alpha Centauri and Hotel Wrecking City Traders
- Released: November 20, 2012
- Studio: Yacht Club; Sheerness, Kent, England (November 2005 – January 2006); Ranscombe Studios; Rochester, Kent, England (June 2008); Donner & Blitzen Studios; Los Angeles, California (August 2009)
- Genre: Desert rock; stoner rock
- Length: 35:11
- Label: Bro Fidelity

Sons of Alpha Centauri chronology
| Last Day of Summer (2009) | WaterWays/Sons of Alpha Centauri/Hotel Wrecking City Traders (2012) | Karma to Burn / Sons of Alpha Centauri (2017) |

Alternative covers
- European cover

Alternative cover
- Australasian cover

WaterWays/Sons of Alpha Centauri/Hotel Wrecking City Traders is a split extended play by the collaborative musical project WaterWays and the rock groups Sons of Alpha Centauri and Hotel Wrecking City Traders. It was released on 20 November 2012 by Bro Fidelity Records.

== History and production ==
WaterWays are a band featuring Gary Arce, as well as Mario Lalli and Tony Tornay of Fatso Jetson. Notably, the band also had a vocalist in Abby Travis, who is known for her involvement with the Eagles of Death Metal, Masters of Reality and The Bangles. From 2009 through to 2011, WaterWays recordings had been delayed significantly and re-recorded as "Big Scenic Nowhere". However, when the tracks became available, the first singles were released on Yawning Sons/WaterWays. Hotel Wrecking City Traders had released a collaborative project with Arce entitled Hotel Wrecking City Traders & Gary Arce in 2011, while Sons of Alpha Centauri had been working with Yawning Man since 2008 as Yawning Sons.

In 2012, following two separate collaborative projects from Arce with both Sons of Alpha Centauri and Hotel Wrecking City Traders, Bro Fidelity Records decided to release a triple way split project of the three artists.

== Recording and release ==
The release contains four songs from WaterWays on Side A, as well as unreleased material from both Sons of Alpha Centauri and Hotel Wrecking City Traders on Side B. The Sons of Alpha Centauri track, "27", was omitted from their eponymous debut studio album due to its length, with the band saying it was "too long to fit on the original album."

In 20 November 2012, Bro Fidelity Records released the split on heavyweight 12-inch, 180-gram, triple-colour vinyl. Three artwork covers, representing the three different continents (Australasia, Europe and North America) involved in the making of the split, were designed and produced by artist Alex von Wieding. The record was released to very positive reviews for all three of the bands and their "aesthetic delivery", and has not been digitally released.

WaterWays' delayed recordings, which were re-recorded as "Big Scenic Nowhere", were made available at the 2013 London DesertFest for whoever purchased them.

== Track listing ==
Side A – WaterWays
| No. | Title | Length |
|---|---|---|
| 1. | "Piece of You" | 4:21 |
| 2. | "Queen" | 3:27 |
| 3. | "The Blacksmith" | 4:51 |
| 4. | "WaterWays" | 4:07 |
| Total length: | | 16:46 |

Side B
| No. | Title | Writer(s) | Length |
|---|---|---|---|
| 1. | "27" | Sons of Alpha Centauri | 8:48 |
| 2. | "Pulmo Victus" | Hotel Wrecking City Traders | 9:37 |
| Total length: | | | 18:25 |

== Personnel ==
WaterWays

- Abby Travis – vocals
- Gary Arce – electric guitar
- Mario Lalli – bass guitar
- Tony Tornay – drums

Sons of Alpha Centauri

- Blake – sound manipulation
- Nick Hannon – bass guitar
- Marlon King – electric guitar
- Stevie B – drums

Hotel Wrecking City Traders

- Toby – electric guitar
- Ben – drums
