= 8.11. =

2017 album by Treekillaz

Studio album by Treekillaz
- Released: February 17, 2017
- Genres: Intense rock; grunge; stoner rock
- Length: 43:51
- Label: N-Gage Productions
- Producer: Jessi Brustolin

Treekillaz chronology
Season of the Lonesome (2009)	8.11. (2017)

8.11. is the eighth and final studio album by Swiss rock band Treekillaz. It was released on February 17, 2017, through N-Gage Productions.

The band announced its breakup less than a year after the album's release.

== Background and recording ==
The album title reflects its status as the band's eighth album, containing 11 songs, while the cover art features an image of professional wrestler Lex Luger. The album features guest appearances from Karma to Burn guitarist Will Mecum on three tracks: "My Mind", "Addicted", and "Ladyboy".

8.11. was written and produced by the band's guitarist Jessi Brustolin. In a 2018 interview with Tracks Magazin, when asked why the album was "more metal than usual", he explained:

"We've constantly evolved musically over the past twenty years. In recent years, we've moved further forward, playing more directly and less grunge. The last two albums have been very well received by the audience. We've received a lot of feedback saying that we should have been playing like this ten years ago."

== Critical reception ==
8.11.
Review scores
Source	Rating
Powermetal.de	8/10
Rock Hard	7/10
Terrorverlag	8.5/10 stars

Walter Scheurer of Powermetal.de wrote that the band "know[s] how to pull out all the stops, employing different styles and drawing inspiration from several decades", adding that they "do indeed traverse the entire spectrum of rock, and they do it brilliantly." He described the album as "[m]ultifaceted, intense, and fun at the same time".

Ulrike Meyer-Potthoff of Terrorverlag wrote that the group's music "once again disproves the stereotype that life in Switzerland is always laid-back". She concluded: "This Swiss band packs a serious punch; don't let the ugly album cover put you off!"

Thorsten Jünemann, writing for Metalglory, called it: "A truly pleasant, intense, yet varied surprise that manages to be entertaining without any filler and provides melodic yet hard-hitting mid-tempo listening pleasure with every play, going all out from the very beginning."

Michael Breuer of RockTimes.info described the album as "three-quarters of an hour of deeply authentic rock music that draws on temporary trends like stoner, grunge, and punk, but ultimately delivers one thing: hard, honest rock 'n' roll, energetic and provocative, without denying a certain sense of melody and variation. Intense, made in Switzerland."

== Track listing ==
8.11. track listing
No.	Title	Length
1.	"U-R"	3:39
2.	"Take It Slow"	4:05
3.	"My Mind"	3:51
4.	"Rock'n'roll Bitch"	3:22
5.	"Addicted"	2:38
6.	"Enabler"	3:01
7.	"Erna"	4:45
8.	"Ladyboy"	3:10
9.	"Strong"	3:27
10.	"Ride Again"	3:39
11.	"On the Run"	8:09
Total length:		43:51
