= Karma to Burn (disambiguation) =

Karma to Burn is an American rock band.

Karma to Burn may also refer to:

- Karma to Burn (Karma to Burn album), 1997
- Karma to Burn (The Waterboys album), 2005
