= Last Day of Summer (Sons of Alpha Centauri and Treasure Cat album) =

Last of Day Summer

Studio album by Sons of Alpha Centauri and Treasure Cat
- Released: October 7, 2009
- Studio: Ranscombe Studios (Rochester, Kent, England); Zone 8 Studios (Granville, West Virginia, U.S.)
- Genre: Post-metal; stoner rock; space rock; post-rock
- Length: 54:03
- Label: Underdogma
- Producer: Mark Poole; Jim Riley

Sons of Alpha Centauri chronology
Sons of Alpha Centauri (2007)	Last Day of Summer (2009)	WaterWays/Sons of Alpha Centauri/Hotel Wrecking City Traders (2012)

Last Day of Summer is a collaborative studio album by British instrumental rock band Sons of Alpha Centauri and American instrumental rock band Treasure Cat. It was released on 7 October 2009 under the imprint of Underdogma Records.

== Production ==
In 2006, Nick Hannon spoke to Will Mecum of Karma to Burn, asking if he would be interested in coming to the United Kingdom to record with Sons of Alpha Centauri. Mecum accepted and chose to bring Roy Brewer, the drummer from Treasure Cat, his band at the time. Mecum and Brewer recorded three tracks with members of Sons of Alpha Centauri under the moniker Alpha Cat, with the final album also consisting of four Sons of Alpha Centauri tracks and four Treasure Cat tracks. The collaborative, co-produced split release was deemed to be one of the first of its kind.

The Alpha Cat and Sons of Alpha Centauri tracks were recorded with Jim Riley at Ranscombe Studios in Rochester, Kent, while the Treasure Cat tracks were recorded at Zone 8 Studios in Granville, West Virginia. The recording and release of the album marked the beginning of an ongoing working partnership between Sons of Alpha Centauri and Karma to Burn.

== Themes ==
Although the music contain no lyrics, the artwork, composed by Jimbo Valentine, is visibly influenced by conspiracy theories such as the New World Order, the Moon landing hoax, the writings of Zecharia Sitchin, Anglo-American relations (including the Special Relationship) and mass surveillance.

== Critical reception ==
Professional ratings
Review scores
Source	Rating
Altsounds	92/100
Deaf Sparrow	3.5/5 stars
HeavyMetal.dk	8/10
Lords of Metal	79/100
PowerMetal.de	8/10
RockFreaks.net	7/10
Zwaremetalen	78/100

Upon its release, Last Day of Summer received generally favourable reviews from music critics, receiving an average score of 3.67 out of 5 on Rate Your Music. Lords of Metal described the album as "varied, strong, steaming, superb production and set into a great jacket." Of the album's instrumental nature, The Sleeping Shaman said that the "vocals are not missed at all, due to the dynamic feel and structure of the music."

Altsounds commented that the album strayed away from Sons of Alpha Centauri's usual sound, stating that "whereas they previously lulled us into a false sense of calm before ripping across the musical spectrum like cutting comment at a hostile band practice, here they unleash the beast and just give us the best of everything they've got." Disagreement.net praised the collaborative Alpha Cat tracks, stating that they "link [the two bands'] genres which after all are not that dissimilar to make Last Day of Summer an incoherent listening experience." Steve Howe of The Sludgelord, a rock blog, described the album as "a sprawling instrumental stoner rock odyssey packed with blazing riffs from two bands at the top of their game," adding that he felt it was "one of 2009's best instrumental rock albums."

Deaf Sparrow gave the album a mixed review, commenting that the Alpha Cat tracks "are scrambled in the sequence, perhaps as an effort to put both bands in the same plane." RockFreaks.net were pleased with the album but did not find it unique, stating that "if you disregard the undeniable excitement that comes from realizing how this project approaches genius in the way that it has been put together, the songs aren't actually that amazing as standalone tracks."

== Track listing ==
No.	Title	Writer(s)	Producer(s)	Length
1.	"The Flying Dutchman"	Alpha Cat	Jim Riley	3:10
2.	"Battle of Britain"	Treasure Cat	Mark Poole	4:09
3.	"Tribute to Harmonious"	Sons of Alpha Centauri	Riley	6:09
4.	"Valhalla"	Treasure Cat	Poole	4:18
5.	"Last Day of Summer"	Alpha Cat	Riley	5:03
6.	"Under Surveillance"	Sons of Alpha Centauri	Riley	5:18
7.	"Dresden"	Treasure Cat	Poole	4:19
8.	"Fire"	Alpha Cat	Riley	4:25
9.	"Crossing the Border"	Sons of Alpha Centauri	Riley	7:00
10.	"On a Clear Day"	Treasure Cat	Poole	4:55
11.	"Exhaust"	Sons of Alpha Centauri	Riley	5:17
Total length:				54:03

== Personnel ==
Credits for Last Day of Summer adapted from Discogs.

- Rory Alderson – engineer
- Stevie B. – drums
- Blake – sound manipulation
- Roy Brewer – drums
- Matthew Cross – bass guitar
- Marlon King – electric guitar
- Wesley King – photography
- Nick Hannon – bass guitar
- Alpha Cat – electric guitar
- Mark Poole – producer, mixing
- Jim Riley – producer, mastering
- Bob Williams – photography
