= Ceremony to the Sunset =

Studio album by Yawning Sons
- Released: June 15, 2009; October 25, 2014 (vinyl)
- Genre: Desert rock; stoner rock
- Length: 43:14; 47:36 (vinyl)
- Label: Lexicon Devil; Alone
- Producer: Yawning Sons; Jim Riley

Yawning Sons chronology
Ceremony to the Sunset (00000004)	Yawning Sons/WaterWays (2010)

Deluxe vinyl edition

Ceremony to the Sunset is the debut studio album by Yawning Sons, a collaborative musical project formed by members of American band Yawning Man and British band Sons of Alpha Centauri. It was released on June 15, 2009, by Lexicon Devil Records, with a deluxe vinyl edition released by Alone Records on October 25, 2014.

== Production ==
In 2008, Gary Arce of Yawning Man was invited to the United Kingdom by the band Sons of Alpha Centauri to produce new tracks, but upon arrival, the idea of simply producing the record was scrapped. Within one week, Arce and Sons of Alpha Centauri had written and recorded an entire album's worth of material together, working at Ranscombe Studios in Rochester, Kent with Jim Riley as their producer.

== Critical reception ==
Professional ratings
Review scores
Source	Rating
Sputnikmusic	4.2/5
Heathen Harvest	4/5 stars
Dosenmusik	11/15
Musik an sich	17/20
Sludge Worm	9/10
Subba Cultcha	4/5 stars

The album received generally positive reviews from music critics. It was placed eighth on both The Obelisk and The Aquarian Weekly's Top 10 albums of 2009, while the Roadburn Festival named it Album of the Day on their website on 17 December 2009. Lords of Metal commented that the album's music is "very suitable to enjoy on a warm summer evening, in a lazy chair with the legs up, watching a spectacular sunset."

Sputnikmusic remarked that the album's sound "is like no other experienced before and like nothing that will be experienced again." I-94 Bar said that its music "works on many levels, like Tom Verlaine's vocal-less efforts, and playing it in the background while performing everyday tasks (like open heart surgery or splitting the atom) is possible without nodding off." Sander van den Driesche of Echoes and Dust said that the album should be seen as "a classic album, not perhaps as a desert rock album per se, but as an album mixing ambient elements with desert rock, psych and space rock."

Commenting on the album's musical style, Sam O. of Ninehertz said that the album "blends aspects of desert-psychedelia with post rock influences from good, old, miserable England," though adding that he "hoped that this album wouldn't run a nautical theme throughout as I guess that watery themed songs would kill all the hopes of desert imagery." Heathen Harvest noted that "though this album is instrumental, it seems to have a lot to say without the need for words, and if there is one thing that is impressive about this new project, it is that." The Sleeping Shaman also had praise for the album, calling it "a triumphant partnership where laid back Californian cool collided with the British masters of cerebral ambient riffing."

== Track listing ==
All songs written and composed by Yawning Sons and produced by Jim Riley.

No.	Title	Length
1.	"Ghostship/Deadwater"	8:32
2.	"Tomahawk Watercress"	6:57
3.	"Wetlands"	6:40
4.	"Whales in Tar"	2:48
5.	"Meadows"	8:09
6.	"Garden Sessions III"	5:21
7.	"Japanese Garden"	4:47
Total length:		43:14

Deluxe vinyl edition bonus track
No.	Title	Length
8.	"Shores of Desolation"	4:22

Notes

- "Ghostship/Deadwater" contains additional vocals by Rich File.
- "Meadows" contains uncredited vocals by Mathias Schnebert.
- "Garden Sessions III" contains additional vocals and guitars by Scott Reeder.

== Personnel ==
Credits adapted from Allmusic.

- Rory Alderson – Audio engineer
- Gary Arce – Primary artist, electric guitar, lapsteel guitar, liner notes
- Ian Bailey – Audio engineer
- Blake – Textures
- Rich File – Vocal engineer
- Wendy Rae Fowler – Primary artist
- Nick Hannon – Primary artist, bass guitar
- Marlon King – Primary artist, bongo drum, guitar, electronic organ
- Wes King – Photography
- Mario Lalli – Primary artist
- Scott Reeder – Primary artist, guitar engineer, vocal engineer
- Jim Riley – Record producer, audio mastering, audio mixing
- Stevie B – Primary artist, drums
