= Rob Oswald =

American drummer (born 1964)

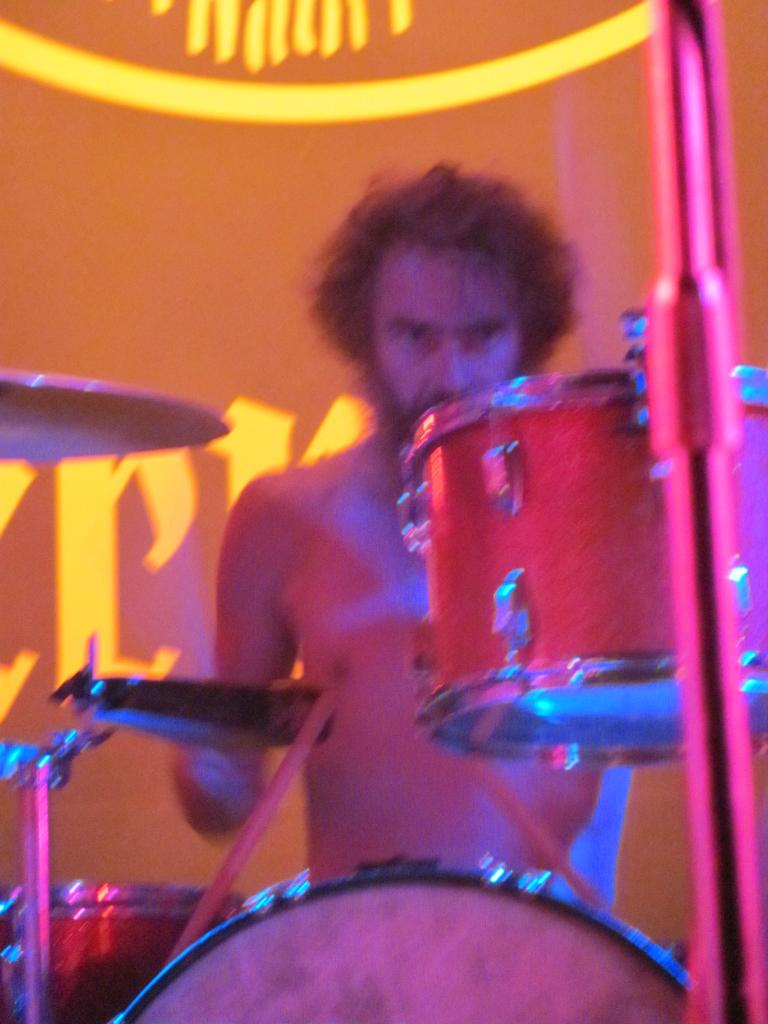
- Oswald in 2010

Background information
- Born: 1964 (age 61–62); Baltimore, Maryland, U.S.
- Genres: Stoner rock Rock
- Occupation: Musician
- Instrument: Drums
- Years active: 1996–2012
- Formerly of: Karma to Burn; Year Long Disaster; Nebula; Mondo Generator

Robert Oswald (born 1964 in Baltimore, Maryland) is an American drummer. Oswald is best known as the former drummer for Karma to Burn. He has previously been a member of various bands including Year Long Disaster, Mondo Generator, Nebula, Buttsteak, Lee Harvey Keitel Band, Caffeine Driven Stress Magnets and Jade. He currently resides in the Laurel Canyon area of Los Angeles with the rest of his bandmates.

In a 2012 Facebook post, Oswald announced that he had retired from music.

== Discography ==
=== Karma to Burn ===
- Wild, Wonderful Purgatory (Roadrunner Records, 1999)
- Almost Heathen (Spitfire Records, 2001)
- Appalachian Incantation (Napalm Records, 2010)
- V (Napalm Records, 2011)

=== Mondo Generator ===
- Cocaine Rodeo (2000, Southern Lord)

=== Nebula ===
- Heavy Psych (2009, Tee Pee Records)
