= Sons of Alpha Centauri / A Death Cinematic =

"Sons of Alpha Centauri/A Death Cinematic"

Single by Sons of Alpha Centauri and A Death Cinematic
- Released: 21 January 2010
- Genre: Ambient
- Length: 55:43
- Label: Simple Box Construction

Sons of Alpha Centauri singles chronology
| "Fourteen/65" (2010) | "Sons of Alpha Centauri/A Death Cinematic" (2010) | "Fifty Three/71" (2014) |

"Sons of Alpha Centauri/A Death Cinematic" is a split single by British band Sons of Alpha Centauri and American musician A Death Cinematic. It was released on 21 January 2010 by Simple Box Construction, which is owned by A Death Cinematic. The single is not formally recognised by Sons of Alpha Centauri and does not form part of the band's discography on their website.

== Composition ==
The tracks from the single consist of various interludes and outros from Sons of Alpha Centauri's live performances between 2004 and 2007. It was previously known as "Ambient Visions" as part of a side project called the Progressive Experimental Ambience Research League (P.E.A.R.L), together with various sonic experiments approved by members of Godspeed! You Black Emperor and featured work on recordings from Set Fire to Flames and Hrsta.

== Release ==
Simple Box Construction, based in Michigan, composed a manipulated chipboard gatefold sleeve and ropey cherry veneer with each cover and veneer cut by hand, fitted and held together with black charcoal paper. The text inside was typeset and hand stamped on each half of the cover with cedar wood construct insert and postcard set of 88 copies.

The high intensity physical composition and content of "Sons of Alpha Centauri/A Death Cinematic" were both very well received by critics, with many heavily citing early Tangerine Dream as a reference point for the single.

== Critical reception ==
"Sons of Alpha Centauri/A Death Cinematic" received generally positive reviews from music critics, including a number 2 place in Scene Point Blank's Top 5 Splits and Collaborations of 2010, losing out to the House of Low Culture/Mamiffer split.

Babysue described the single's tracks as "strange recordings" that "sound something like the soundtrack to being on another planet", while Foxy Digitalis described it as "eerie as hell, miraculously welded together to form a frightening soundtrack of ominous bleeps, burps, percussives, et al. that quite possibly capture the sounds of outer space if you were lost in the outer galaxies and someone could actually hear you scream." The one true dead angel commented that A Death Cinematic's sounds on the single are "sparse and the arrangement minimalist but prone to subtly complex modulations."

The single scores an average of 4.50 out of 5 on Rate Your Music.

== Track listing ==
| No. | Title | Writer(s) | Length |
|---|---|---|---|
| 1. | "Ambient Visions" | Sons of Alpha Centauri | 26:23 |
| 2. | "We Brave the Storms While Our Lands Fall into the Sea Beneath the Pandemonium of the Sun…" | A Death Cinematic | 13:53 |
| 3. | "And These Nights Have Brought" | A Death Cinematic | 15:27 |
| Total length: | | | 55:43 |

Notes

- "Ambient Visions" is split into four segments entitled "Solar Flare", "Hemera", "Ocean Floor" and "Transmission".
