= Wild, Wonderful Purgatory =

Studio album by Karma to Burn
- Released: May 31, 1999 (Europe); July 7, 1999 (North America)
- Genre: Instrumental rock; stoner metal; sludge metal; stoner rock
- Length: 47:03
- Label: Roadrunner (Europe); MIA (U.S.); Emetic (2009 reissue); Heavy Psych Sounds (2022 reissue)
- Producer: Karma to Burn; Garry Rindfuss

Karma to Burn chronology
Karma to Burn (1997)	Wild, Wonderful Purgatory (1999)	Almost Heathen (2001)

Professional ratings
Review scores
Source	Rating
AllMusic	4/5 stars
NME	3.5/5 stars
Sputnikmusic	3.5/5 stars

Wild, Wonderful Purgatory is the second studio album by stoner rock band Karma to Burn. The album was released on May 31, 1999, in Europe by Roadrunner UK, and July 7, 1999, in the U.S. by MIA Records. It was reissued on March 18, 2022, by Heavy Psych Sounds Records.

It is their first fully instrumental album after the departure of former vocalist Jason Jarosz; a style they would keep for most subsequent releases. The album title refers to the West Virginia slogan, "Wild and Wonderful".

== Track listing ==
All tracks are written by Karma to Burn.

No.	Title	Length
1.	"Twenty"	3:30
2.	"Twenty Eight"	4:22
3.	"Thirty"	3:26
4.	"Thirty One"	5:23
5.	"Twenty Nine"	3:03
6.	"Thirty Two"	5:00
7.	"Twenty Five"	4:40
8.	"Twenty Six"	4:13
9.	"One"	4:05
10.	"Three"	3:57
11.	"Seven"	4:40
12.	"Eight"	4:44
Total length:		47:03

== Personnel ==
- Will Mecum – guitar
- Rich Mullins – bass
- Rob Oswald – drums

== Notes ==
The tracks "Twenty Nine" and "Thirty Two" appeared on the soundtrack of the 2000 EA Sports video game NASCAR 2001.
