= Mike Judge Presents: Tales from the Tour Bus =

- Genre: Documentary; Comedy
- Created by: Mike Judge; Richard Mullins; Dub Cornett
- Narrated by: Mike Judge
- Theme music composer: John Frizzell; Mike Judge
- Composer: John Frizzell
- Country of origin: United States
- Original language: English
- No. of seasons: 2
- No. of episodes: 16

Production
- Executive producers: Mike Judge; Glen Zipper; Sean Stuart; Dub Cornett
- Producer: Richard Mullins
- Running time: 24–29 minutes
- Production companies: Judgmental Films; Zipper Bros Films; Sutter Road Picture Co.; Diamond Docs

Original release
- Network: Cinemax
- Release: September 22, 2017 – December 21, 2018

Mike Judge Presents: Tales from the Tour Bus is an American animated docuseries television series created by Mike Judge, Richard Mullins and Dub Cornett that premiered on September 22, 2017, on Cinemax. It is Cinemax's first animated series.

== Premise ==
The series is presented as a biographical oral history of musicians with each season focusing on a specific genre. It is narrated by Mike Judge and presents anecdotes of star performers as told by their families, bandmates, and close associates. Interview subjects are presented in rotoscope and their anecdotes in a contrasting cel animation style, interspersed with performance footage and news footage.

== Production ==
On January 12, 2017, it was announced that Cinemax had given the production a series order for a first season consisting of eight episodes. The show was created by Mike Judge, Richard Mullins, and Dub Cornett. Judge and Cornett executive produce, Bob Engelman co-executive produces, and Mullins produces.

On May 16, 2018, it was announced that the series had been renewed for a second season moving the genre focus from country to the likes of James Brown and P-Funk. Joining the series creative team are Mark Monroe as a co-executive producer and Nelson George as a consulting producer. On October 4, 2018, it was reported that the second season would premiere on November 2, 2018.

== Release ==
On September 14, 2017, Cinemax released the first official trailer for the series.

== Episodes ==
=== Series overview ===
Season	Episodes	Originally released	
Season	Episodes	First released	Last released
1	8	September 22, 2017	November 10, 2017
2	8	November 2, 2018	December 21, 2018

=== Season 1 (2017) ===
No. overall	No. in season	Title	Directed by	Written by	Original release date	US viewers (millions)
1	1	"Johnny Paycheck"	Mike Judge	Julien Nitzberg, Jeff Feuerzeig, Richard Mullins, Dub Cornett, & Mike Judge	September 22, 2017	N/A
2	2	"Jerry Lee Lewis"	Mike Judge	Mark Monroe & Mike Judge	September 29, 2017	0.069
3	3	"George Jones and Tammy Wynette (Part One)"	Mike Judge	Mark Monroe, Jeff Feuerzeig, Julien Nitzberg, & Mike Judge	October 6, 2017	0.050
4	4	"George Jones and Tammy Wynette (Part Two)"	Mike Judge	Mark Monroe, Jeff Feuerzeig, Julien Nitzberg, & Mike Judge	October 13, 2017	N/A
5	5	"Billy Joe Shaver"	Mike Judge	Mark Monroe & Mike Judge	October 20, 2017	0.061
6	6	"Waylon Jennings (Part One)"	Mike Judge	Mark Monroe & Mike Judge	October 27, 2017	0.125
7	7	"Waylon Jennings (Part Two)"	Mike Judge	Mark Monroe & Mike Judge	November 3, 2017	0.105
8	8	"Blaze Foley"	Mike Judge	Mark Monroe & Mike Judge	November 10, 2017	0.045

=== Season 2 (2018) ===
No. overall	No. in season	Title	Directed by	Written by	Original release date	US viewers (millions)
9	1	"George Clinton"	Mike Judge	Mark Monroe & Mike Judge	November 2, 2018	N/A
10	2	"Rick James (Part One)"	Mike Judge	Mark Monroe & Mike Judge	November 9, 2018	N/A
11	3	"Rick James (Part Two)"	Mike Judge	Mark Monroe & Mike Judge	November 16, 2018	N/A
12	4	"Bootsy Collins"	Mike Judge	Mark Monroe & Mike Judge	November 23, 2018	N/A
13	5	"James Brown (Part One)"	Mike Judge	Mark Monroe & Mike Judge	November 30, 2018	0.094
14	6	"James Brown (Part Two)"	Mike Judge	Mark Monroe & Mike Judge	December 7, 2018	0.040
15	7	"Morris Day and The Time"	Mike Judge	Mark Monroe & Mike Judge	December 14, 2018	0.055
16	8	"Betty Davis"	Mike Judge	Mark Monroe & Mike Judge	December 21, 2018	N/A

== Reception ==
The first season has been met with a positive response from critics. On the review aggregation website Rotten Tomatoes, the series holds a 100% approval rating with an average rating of 8.5 out of 10, based on 8 reviews. Metacritic, which uses a weighted average, assigned the series a score of 83 out of 100 based on 5 critics, indicating "universal acclaim".
