= Black Magic; All Mysteries Revealed =

Studio album by Year Long Disaster
- Released: March 9, 2010
- Recorded: Sound City Studios (Los Angeles, California)
- Genre: Hard rock; blues rock; southern rock; stoner rock
- Length: 42:25
- Label: Volcom
- Producer: Nick Raskulinecz

Year Long Disaster chronology
Year Long Disaster (2007)	Black Magic; All Mysteries Revealed (2010)

Singles from Black Magic; All Mysteries Revealed
- 1. "Show Me Your Teeth" Released: 2010

Black Magic; All Mysteries Revealed is the second studio album by American hard rock band Year Long Disaster. Recorded at Sound City Studios with producer Nick Raskulinecz, it was released on March 9, 2010 by Volcom Entertainment. "Show Me Your Teeth" was released as a single.

== Concept and style ==
Black Magic; All Mysteries Revealed is said to be loosely based on the novel The Master and Margarita by Russian author Mikhail Bulgakov. Speaking in an interview, Year Long Disaster frontman Daniel Davies explained that the band was influenced by the book's themes of "good and evil, spiritual and material" when writing the songs on the album.

== Reception ==
Professional ratings
Review scores
Source	Rating
AllMusic	3.5/5 stars
DisAgreement.net	5/10
Metal Rage	83/100
MetalReviews.com	87/100
Metal Temple	8/10
Punknews.org	2.5/5 stars
Punk Rock Theory	7.5/10
ThePunkSite.com	1/5 stars

Media response to Black Magic; All Mysteries Revealed was mixed. Gregory Heaney of AllMusic suggested that the album is better than its predecessor, 2007's Year Long Disaster, describing its sound as "darker and heavier" than the self-titled release. Heaney noted that "the songs feel less rushed, giving them the relaxed and confident demeanor of a band that's starting to come into their own as songwriters", highlighting tracks including "Major Arcana" and "Show Me Your Teeth". Punknews.org's review of the album was less positive, claiming that the band's music "lack[s] depth"; the reviewer did, however, admit that "the band is at least good at what they do".

== Track listing ==
No.	Title	Length
1.	"Black Magic (Intro)"	1:17
2.	"Show Me Your Teeth"	3:56
3.	"Love Like Blood"	3:50
4.	"Stranger in My Room"	3:42
5.	"Sparrow Hill"	6:39
6.	"Seven of Swords"	3:33
7.	"She Told Us All"	4:23
8.	"Venus at the Crossroads"	3:55
9.	"Major Arcana"	3:05
10.	"Foggy Bottom"	4:52
11.	"Cyclone"	3:19

== Personnel ==
- Daniel Davies – vocals, guitar
- Rich Mullins – bass
- Brad Hargreaves – drums, percussion

Additional personnel

- Nick Raskulinecz – producer, mixer
- Paul Figueroa – engineer
- Adam Ayan – mastering
- Sean Oakley – engineering assistance
- Aaron Dahl – mixing assistance
- Ted CoConis – cover artwork
- Desire Pfeiffer – photography
- Sophie Gransard – layout
