= Appalachian Incantation =

Studio album by Karma to Burn
- Released: April 30, 2010
- Genre: Instrumental rock; stoner rock
- Length: 38 minutes (Standard edition); 66 minutes (Limited edition)
- Label: Napalm; Heavy Psych Sounds (2022 reissue)
- Producer: Scott Reeder; Karma to Burn

Karma to Burn chronology
| Almost Heathen (2001) | Appalachian Incantation (2010) | V (2011) |

Professional ratings
Review scores
| Source | Rating |
|---|---|
| AllMusic | 4.5/5 stars |
| Dead Rhetoric | 7.5/10 |
| DisAgreement.net | 7/10 |
| MetalReviews.com | 80/100 |
| Metal Temple | 8/10 |
| Sea of Tranquility | 4/5 stars |

Appalachian Incantation is the fourth studio album by the stoner rock band Karma to Burn. The album was the band's first studio release after a seven-year hiatus that lasted from 2002–2009. It was released on April 30, 2010, on Napalm Records, and later reissued in 2022 by Heavy Psych Sounds Records.

Like their previous two releases, Appalachian Incantation is largely an instrumental album, although one track features vocals from Daniel Davies of Year Long Disaster. There is also a version with limited edition bonus disc entitled Cat Got Your Tongue EP. The bonus disc includes remastered rarities and re-recordings, one of which is a vocal track featuring John Garcia of Kyuss.

== Background ==
Karma to Burn dissolved in 2002 due to a confrontation between band members Rich Mullins and William Mecum regarding the former’s heroin addiction. After leaving Karma to Burn, Mullins first joined Speedealer, and then co-founded Year Long Disaster with musician Daniel Davies. During the seven-year break, Mullins hoped for a Karma to Burn reunion, but did nothing to make it happen, ascertaining that the reunion could only happen if he reconciled with Mecum.

In 2009, both Mecum and Mullins reconciled, and reformed the group to record a new album. Mecum and Year Long Disaster frontman Davies had been writing songs together, and wrote one called “Waiting on the Western World”, which was only the second of their collaborations (the first was a song for Year Long Disaster called “Seven of Swords”). Enjoying the writing process for the song, Mecum brought “Waiting on the Western World” to a Karma to Burn rehearsal, and it was decided to use the song on the band’s upcoming record - as well as to eventually make a Karma to Burn album featuring vocals and lyrics on every song, with Mullins stating the band’s hope for it to result in something better than their debut album.

== Track listing ==
=== Standard release ===
All tracks are written by Karma to Burn.

| No. | Title | Length |
|---|---|---|
| 1. | "Forty Four" | 5:11 |
| 2. | "Forty Two" | 3:58 |
| 3. | "Forty One" | 4:57 |
| 4. | "Forty Six" | 3:13 |
| 5. | "Waiting on the Western World" | 5:42 |
| 6. | "Forty Three" | 4:43 |
| 7. | "Forty Five" | 6:36 |
| 8. | "Twenty Four" | 3:44 |

Bonus track (Napalm release)
| No. | Title | Length |
|---|---|---|
| 9. | "Two Times" | 4:53 |

=== Cat Got Our Tongue EP (limited edition bonus disc) ===
| No. | Title | Length |
|---|---|---|
| 1. | "Two Times" | 4:53 |
| 2. | "Fourteen" | 5:05 |
| 3. | "Ten" | 2:55 |
| 4. | "Thirteen" | 4:16 |
| 5. | "Six" | 3:51 |
| 6. | "Twenty" (2009 re-recording) | 3:33 |
| 7. | "Thirty" (2009 re-recording) | 3:36 |

== Personnel ==
- Will Mecum – guitar
- Rich Mullins – bass
- Rob Oswald – drums
- Daniel Davies – vocals ("Waiting on the Western World")
- John Garcia – vocals ("Two Times")
