= Year Long Disaster (album) =

Studio album by Year Long Disaster
- Released: August 21, 2007
- Recorded: Waterworks Recording West (Tucson, Arizona)
- Genre: Hard rock; blues rock; southern rock; stoner rock
- Length: 48:11
- Label: Volcom
- Producer: James J. Waters

Year Long Disaster chronology
Year Long Disaster (2007)	Black Magic; All Mysteries Revealed (2010)

Singles from Year Long Disaster
- 1. "Leda Atomica/It Ain't Luck" Released: 2007; 2. "Per Qualche Dollaro in Piu" Released: 2007

Year Long Disaster is the self-titled debut studio album by American hard rock band Year Long Disaster. Recorded at Waterworks Recording West in Tucson, Arizona with producer James J. Waters, it was released on August 21, 2007, by Volcom Entertainment. "Leda Atomica/It Ain't Luck" and "Per Qualche Dollaro in Piu" were released as singles.

== Recording and production ==
Year Long Disaster was recorded at producer James J. Waters' studio Waterworks Recording West in Tucson, Arizona, mixed by Brian Scheuble at The Village in Los Angeles, California, and mastered by Dave Cheppa at Better Quality Sound in Los Angeles. In addition to the band's lineup of Daniel Davies on vocals and guitar, Rich Mullins on bass, and Brad Hargreaves on drums and percussion, the album also features Joey Burns (of Tucson-based band Calexico) on cello and double bass, and Vicki Brown on viola and violin.

== Reception ==
Professional ratings
Review scores
Source	Rating
AllMusic	3/5 stars
MetalReviews.com	82/100
Punk Rock Theory	8/10
Tiny Mix Tapes	1/5 stars

Media response to Year Long Disaster was mixed. Rick Anderson of AllMusic awarded the album three out of five stars, suggesting that while the band's sound is derivative of their influences (including Led Zeppelin, Cream and Black Sabbath), they "deserve credit for embracing their influences without shame".

== Track listing ==
No.	Title	Length
1.	"Per Qualche Dollardo in Piu"	4:00
2.	"Leda Atomica"	3:55
3.	"Cold Killer"	3:20
4.	"Destination"	5:05
5.	"The Fool and You"	2:38
6.	"Sapphire"	3:42
7.	"It Ain't Luck"	4:04
8.	"Let Me Down"	3:46
9.	"Galea Aponeurotica"	4:19
10.	"Swan on Black Lake"	8:38
11.	"Names of God" (untitled on some releases)	4:44

== Personnel ==
Year Long Disaster

- Daniel Davies – vocals, guitar
- Rich Mullins – bass
- Brad Hargreaves – drums, percussion

Production personnel

- James J. Waters – producer, engineer
- Brian Scheuble – mixing
- Dave Cheppa – mastering

Additional musicians

- Joey Burns – cello, double bass
- Vicki Brown – viola, violin

Artwork personnel

- Carl Bartoles – art direction, design
- Kirsten CoConis – art direction
- Ted CoConis – cover artwork
- Stephen Albanese – photography
