= Almost Heathen =

Studio album by Karma to Burn
- Released: September 4, 2001
- Genre: Instrumental rock; stoner rock
- Length: 48:07; 1:12:58 (2022 reissue)
- Label: Spitfire; Metal Mind Productions (2008 reissue); Emetic (2009 reissue); Heavy Psych Sounds (2022 reissue)
- Producer: Michael Barile

Karma to Burn chronology
| Wild, Wonderful Purgatory (1999) | Almost Heathen (2001) | Appalachian Incantation (2010) |

Alternative cover
- Heavy Psych Sounds reissue

Almost Heathen is the third studio album by the stoner rock band Karma to Burn. It was released on September 4, 2001, by Spitfire Records. It was the last album released before their seven-year disbandment in 2002. The album was reissued in 2008 by Metal Mind Productions and again in 2022 by Heavy Psych Sounds Records.

The album title is a play on the former slogan of West Virginia, "Almost Heaven".

== Reception ==
Professional ratings
Review scores
| Source | Rating |
|---|---|
| AllMusic | 4.5/5 stars |
| Chronicles of Chaos | 5/10 |
| Rock Hard | 8/10 |
| Sea of Tranquility | 3/5 stars |
| Sputnikmusic | 4/5 stars |

Exclaim! wrote that "you either get the fact that they are an all-instrumental trio playing groovy, fuzzed-out rock or you don't ... the trio breaks down into more funky terrain." The Evening Times thought that "the listener is assailed by driving tracks of musical virtuosity where the guitars are to the fore." The Palm Beach Post called the tracks "hypnotic" and "a heavy blend of fuzzy guitars and relentless drums."

== Track listing ==
All tracks are written by Karma to Burn.

| No. | Title | Length |
|---|---|---|
| 1. | "Nineteen" | 4:01 |
| 2. | "Thirty Eight" | 5:50 |
| 3. | "Thirty Four" | 4:12 |
| 4. | "Thirty Seven" | 5:19 |
| 5. | "Thirty Nine" | 5:34 |
| 6. | "Thirty Six" | 4:28 |
| 7. | "Thirty Three" | 4:50 |
| 8. | "Thirty Five" | 5:14 |
| 9. | "Five" | 4:50 |
| 10. | "Forty" | 3:39 |
| Total length: | | 48:07 |

Reissue bonus tracks
| No. | Title | Length |
|---|---|---|
| 11. | "One" (live) | 4:08 |
| 12. | "Three" (live) | 3:55 |
| 13. | "Twenty Two" (live) | 5:27 |
| 14. | "Seven" (live) | 3:01 |
| 15. | "Eight" (live) | 4:04 |
| 16. | "Six" (live) | 4:16 |
| Total length: | | 24:51 |

Note

- The live bonus tracks "Seven" and "Eight" are titled incorrectly as they are actually the songs "Ten" and "Eleven", respectively.

== Personnel ==
- Will Mecum – guitar
- Rich Mullins – bass
- Rob Oswald – drums
