= V (Karma to Burn album) =

Studio album by Karma to Burn
- Released: May 27, 2011
- Genre: Instrumental rock; stoner rock
- Length: 37:46
- Label: Napalm; Heavy Psych Sounds (2022 reissue)
- Producer: Karma to Burn; John Lousteau

Karma to Burn chronology
| Appalachian Incantation (2010) | V (2011) | Arch Stanton (2014) |

Professional ratings
Review scores
| Source | Rating |
|---|---|
| AllMusic | 3/5 stars |
| The Heavy Chronicles | 3/5 stars |
| Metal Kaoz | 5/10 |
| Metal Temple | 8/10 |
| RockFreaks.net | 7/10 |

V is the fifth studio album by the instrumental stoner rock band Karma to Burn. It was released on May 27, 2011, by Napalm Records. The album was later reissued in 2022 by Heavy Psych Sounds Records.

Unlike previous releases, V is not solely an instrumental album. Five tracks are instrumental; the other three feature vocals from Year Long Disaster frontman Daniel Davies. As with previous albums, the instrumental tracks are titled with numbers and vocal tracks are titled with words. The album title is derived from the Roman numeral of five.

== Track listing ==
Standard release

All tracks are written by Karma to Burn, except track 8.

| No. | Title | Length |
|---|---|---|
| 1. | "Forty Seven" | 4:50 |
| 2. | "Fifty" | 4:49 |
| 3. | "Forty Eight" | 5:46 |
| 4. | "The Cynics" | 4:29 |
| 5. | "Forty Nine" | 4:54 |
| 6. | "Fifty One" | 4:40 |
| 7. | "Jimmy D" | 4:25 |
| 8. | "Never Say Die" (Black Sabbath cover) | 3:54 |
| Total length: | | 37:46 |

== Personnel ==
- Will Mecum – guitar
- Rich Mullins – bass
- Rob Oswald – drums
- Daniel Davies – vocals (tracks 4, 7, 8)
