= Mountain Czar =

EP by Karma to Burn
- Released: February 26, 2016
- Genre: Instrumental rock; stoner rock
- Length: 23:31
- Label: SPV/Rodeostar

Karma to Burn chronology
Arch Stanton (2014)	Mountain Czar (2016)	Karma to Burn / Sons of Alpha Centauri (2017)

Singles from Mountain Czar
- 1. "Sixty-Two" Released: February 5, 2016

Professional ratings
Review scores
Source	Rating
Dead Rhetoric	8/10
Louder Sound	4/5 stars
Maximum Volume Music	8/10
Metal Temple	4/10
Sea of Tranquility	3.5/5 stars

Mountain Czar is an EP by the instrumental stoner rock band Karma to Burn. It was released on February 26, 2016, by SPV and Rodeostar Records.

Unlike their previous release Arch Stanton, Mountain Czar is not exclusively instrumental, with one track featuring Italian vocalist Stefanie Savy. The song, "Uccidendo Un Sogno", is an Italian-language rewrite of the Tom Petty song Runnin' Down a Dream. Similar to Arch Stanton's album closer, Mountain Czar's closing track also contains a dialogue snippet from the Spaghetti Western, The Good, the Bad and the Ugly.

== Track listing ==
=== Standard release ===
All tracks are written by Karma to Burn, except track 4

No.	Title	Writer(s)	Length
1.	"Sixty-Two"		4:45
2.	"Sixty-One"		4:34
3.	"Sixty"		4:01
4.	"Uccidendo Un Sogno"	Tom Petty/Jeff Lynne/Mike Campbell, lyrical translation by Stephanie Savy	4:29
5.	"Sixty-Three"		5:42
Total length:			23:31

== Personnel ==
- Will Mecum – guitar, bass
- Eric Clutter – bass
- Evan Devine – drums

Additional musicians

- Stephanie Savy – vocals (track 4)
- Manuel Bissig – guitar solo (track 4)
