= Yawning Sons/WaterWays =

EP by Yawning Sons and WaterWays
- Released: December 24, 2010
- Genre: Desert rock; stoner rock
- Length: 9:25
- Label: SpaceAge & Cheesecake

Yawning Sons chronology
Ceremony to the Sunset (2009)	Yawning Sons/WaterWays (2010)

Yawning Sons/WaterWays is a split extended play by the collaborative musical projects Yawning Sons and WaterWays. It was released on December 24, 2010, by SpaceAge & Cheesecake Records. The EP is the second release from Yawning Sons, following up on their debut studio album Ceremony to the Sunset, and received generally positive reviews from music critics.

== Production ==
Following the release of Ceremony to the Sunset, Gary Arce of Yawning Sons went back to the studio at the request of Linda Perry to record a series of tracks with fellow Yawning Sons member Mario Lalli and Fatso Jetson's Tony Tornay at the Donner and Blitzen Studio in Los Angeles. California. The new tracks formed part of a new band called WaterWays, which, together with Arce, Lalli and Tornay, featured Abby Travis on vocals for a selection of tracks.

WaterWays contributed two tracks, whose genre they describe as "aqua beat surf rock", towards the split. At the same time, Yawning Sons re-recorded and expanded one of the "Garden Sessions" outtakes from their Ceremony to the Sunset studio sessions. The tracks were mastered at Abbey Road Studios in London.

== Promotion ==
On February 7, 2011, Nick Hannon of Yawning Sons and SpaceAge & Cheesecake Records owner Peter Peeters promoted the EP on FM Brussel's daytime metal show.

== Track listing ==
Side One – Yawning Sons
No.	Title	Length
1.	"Garden Sessions I"	4:21
Total length:		4:21

Side Two – WaterWays
No.	Title	Length
1.	"Bows & Arrows"	1:34
2.	"Memorial Patterns"	3:30
Total length:		5:04

== Personnel ==
- Gary Arce – electric guitar
- Blake – sound manipulation
- Nick Hannon – bass guitar
- Marlon King – electric guitar
- Mario Lalli – bass guitar
- Stevie B – drums
- Tony Tornay – drums
- Abby Travis – vocals
