= Rich Mullins (bassist) =

American bassist

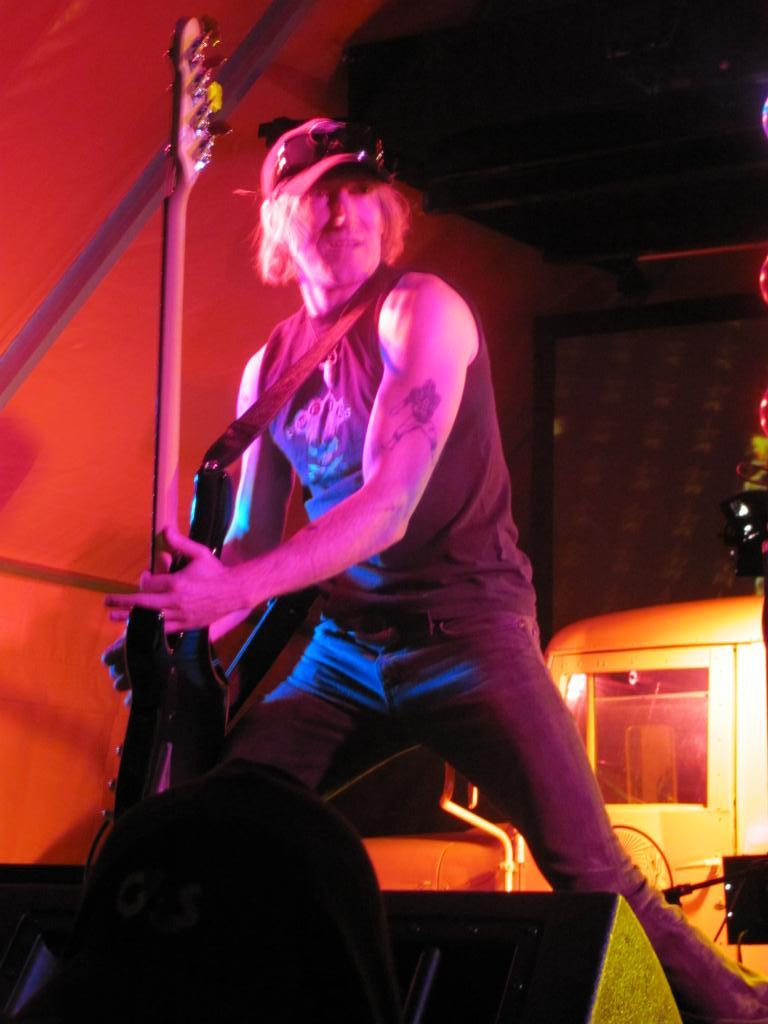
- Mullins in 2010

Background information
- Also known as: Dickie 6
- Genres: Stoner rock; instrumental rock
- Occupation: Musician
- Instrument: Bass guitar
- Years active: 1994–present
- Formerly of: Dancing Linda; Karma to Burn; Year Long Disaster; Speedealer

Richard Mullins is an American musician best known as the former bassist of the rock bands Karma to Burn, Year Long Disaster, and Speedealer (originally REO Speedealer before lawsuit). He also produced and is the co-creator of the animated docuseries, Mike Judge Presents: Tales from the Tour Bus.

== Discography ==
=== Karma to Burn ===
- Karma to Burn (1997, Roadrunner Records)
- Wild, Wonderful Purgatory (1999, Roadrunner Records)
- Almost Heathen (2001, Spitfire Records)
- Appalachian Incantation (2010, Napalm Records)
- V (2011, Napalm Records)
- Karma to Burn: Slight Reprise (2012, Maybe Records)
- Karma to Burn (2013, Heavy Psych Sounds Records)
- Karma to Burn/Sons of Alpha Centauri: The Definitive 7" Trilogy (2017, H42 Records)
- Thee Rabbit Hole (2021, H42 Records)

=== Year Long Disaster ===
- Year Long Disaster (2007, Volcom Entertainment)
- Black Magic; All Mysteries Revealed (2010, Volcom Entertainment)

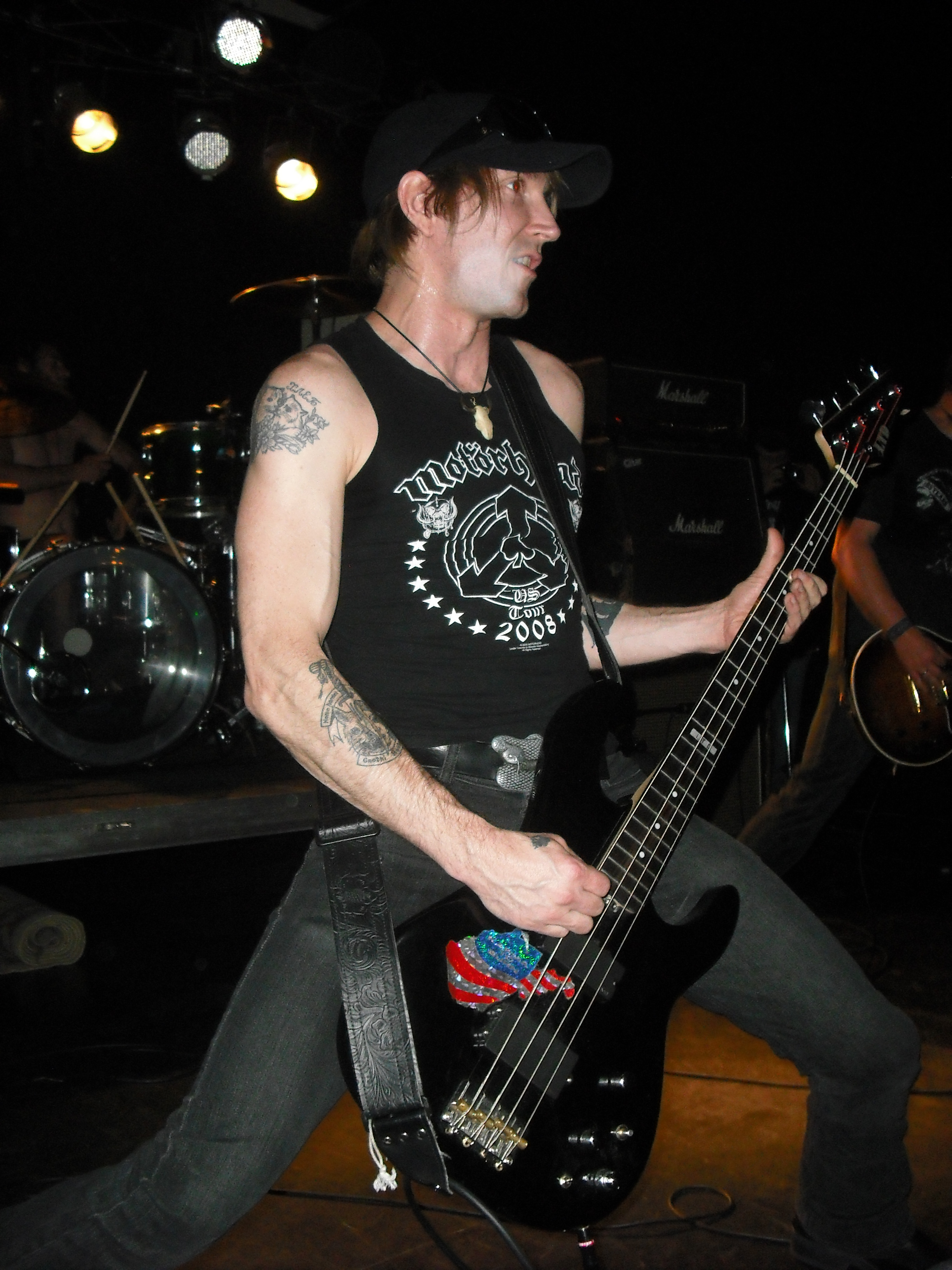
Rich Mullins playing with Karma to Burn in 2009 at the Greene Street Club in Greensboro, North Carolina
