= Sons of Alpha Centauri (album) =

Studio album by Sons of Alpha Centauri
- Released: 26 November 2007
- Genres: Post-metal; stoner rock; space rock; post-rock; ambient
- Length: 67:59
- Label: Sound Devastation
- Producers: Jim Riley; Sons of Alpha Centauri

Sons of Alpha Centauri chronology
Sons of Alpha Centauri (2004)	Sons of Alpha Centauri (2007)	Last Day of Summer (2009)

Sons of Alpha Centauri is the debut studio album by English instrumental rock band Sons of Alpha Centauri. It was released on 26 November 2007 by Sound Devastation Records.

== Recording and release ==
In 2005, Sons of Alpha Centauri began the recording process for their debut album, selecting 12 tracks from 35 that they had written. The tracks selected were representative of the spectrum of music the band had covered within the first 35 tracks. All of the photography for the album was undertaken by the band and Project Redsand, with the album's gatefold artwork designed by Seldon Hunt. The album was mastered by James Plotkin, who had at the time just completed mastering on Panopticon, the third studio album by post-metal band ISIS.

In 2007, Sons of Alpha Centauri signed with Sound Devastation Records, who released the album on 26 November 2007. The album was later released digitally by Poison Tree Records.

== Critical reception ==
Professional ratings
Review scores
Source	Rating
blueprint-FANZINE.de	5.5/10
Deaf Sparrow	3.5/5 stars
The Evil Inquisition	8.5/10
Hard Rock House	7/10
La Horde Noire	6.5/10
MusicScan	7.5/10
Musikreviews.de	4/15
Prog Archives	3/5 stars
RoomThirteen	4/13
VS	13/20

Sons of Alpha Centauri received generally positive reviews from music critics, scoring an average of 3.26 out of 5 from 16 ratings on Rate Your Music. In 2008, the British Library entered the album into both their digital and physical archives, commenting that it was "a milestone for British instrumental heavy music in the 2000s".

Bandidge praised the album, saying that "every riff, drum beat and texture sounds timed to perfection, each element seems just as necessary as the other." Ninehertz also gave the album a positive review, stating that some of its tracks "sound like the score to a '70s science fiction film's main battle scene, whereas some of it sounds like Kyuss at their most loose and laid back, a weird contrast between modern and classic styles which really works." John Lewins of Hard Rock House liked the album's sound, describing it as "stoner rock but also incorporating more ambient moments that evoke the likes of Incubus and Khoma into a mix heavily dominated by Kyuss/QOTSA/Masters of Reality-type grooves." Nadeem Ali of New-Noise.net also gave the album a positive review, concluding that the band did "enough to offer up real hope for the future." In another positive review, Desert-Rock.com described the album as "twelve tracks of purely instrumental stoner rock for an hour of very consistent music."

Scene Slut gave the album a mixed review, stating that the album "makes for an enjoyable listen" but adding that "there's nothing distinguishing about there [sic] tracks and they could belong to any band." Paul Chesworth of RoomThirteen seemed equally unimpressed by the album, commenting that "nothing really stands out over the first few songs" until the fifth track "23", which he believes "seems to have more of a purpose; better constructed sound with some Star Trek 'phasers on stun' sounds," after which the album returns "to more of the same uninspiring melody." COREandCO gave the album a score of 6 out of 10, commenting that it "doesn't get off to a flying start but finishes beautifully," adding that the listener "very much risks getting bored during the album which lasts an hour." Josh Coppola of Sonic Frontiers also felt that the band failed to set themselves apart from others with this album, branding each track "distinct and listenable, although at times slightly repetitive." Coppola also criticised the use of numbers in the track list, which in his opinion created "a somewhat confusing monotony."

Stormbringer.at gave the album a largely negative review, remarking that "for a purely instrumental band, Sons of Alpha Centauri simply offers the listener too little." Helldriver Magazine gave the album a score of 3 out of 7, noting that "the guitar is noisy, the drums rumble and the bass is rarely heard" in the album's overall sound.

== Themes ==
The visual aesthetic of the album contains photography of the SS Richard Montgomery, the Shivering Sands Army Fort and relics of World War II in the Thames Gateway in proximity to the Isle of Sheppey. The music video for "23" reflected both on the Shivering Sands Army Fort and the conflict of World War II including the escalation of armament. It also included themes of isolation, anxiety and paranoia through the story of a British World War II soldier stationed on the forts.

== Track listing ==
All songs written and composed by Sons of Alpha Centauri.

No.	Title	Length
1.	"2"	5:31
2.	"14"	5:21
3.	"15"	6:08
4.	"26"	5:51
5.	"23"	7:07
6.	"25"	4:47
7.	"28"	5:04
8.	"21"	6:29
9.	"9"	6:15
10.	"31"	4:56
11.	"8"	6:05
12.	"34"	4:25
Total length:		67:59

== Personnel ==
- Blake – sound manipulation
- Stevie B. – drums
- Nick Hannon – bass guitar
- Marlon King – electric guitar
