= Arch Stanton =

Studio album by Karma to Burn
- Released: August 18, 2014
- Genre: Instrumental rock; stoner rock
- Length: 37:36
- Label: FABA/Deepdive; Heavy Psych Sounds (2023 reissue)

Karma to Burn chronology
V (2011)	Arch Stanton (2014)	Mountain Czar (2016)

Professional ratings
Review scores
Source	Rating
Encyclopaedia Metallum	83/100
Metal Injection	7/10
Punk Rock Theory	7/10
Sea of Tranquility	3/5 stars
The Signal	7/10
Sputnikmusic	3.7/5

Arch Stanton is the sixth and final studio album by the instrumental stoner rock band Karma to Burn. The album was released on August 18, 2014, by FABA and Deepdive Records, and was reissued in 2023 by Heavy Psych Sounds Records.

Unlike the band's two previous studio albums, Arch Stanton returns to their exclusively instrumental roots. This excludes the album's closing track which features dialogue snippets from the classic Spaghetti Western, The Good, the Bad and the Ugly, from which the album title is derived.

== Track listing ==
Standard release

All tracks are written by Karma to Burn.

No.	Title	Length
1.	"Fifty Seven"	4:26
2.	"Fifty Six"	4:19
3.	"Fifty Three"	4:11
4.	"Fifty Four"	4:32
5.	"Fifty Five"	4:09
6.	"Twenty Three"	5:11
7.	"Fifty Eight"	4:47
8.	"Fifty Nine"	6:01
Total length:		37:36

== Personnel ==
- Will Mecum – guitar, bass
- Evan Devine – drums
