= Yawning Sons =

British-American musical project

- Origin: United Kingdom; United States
- Genres: Desert rock; psychedelic rock; stoner rock
- Years active: 2008–present
- Labels: Lexicon Devil; Alone
- Spinoff of: Yawning Man; Sons of Alpha Centauri
- Members: Gary Arce; Mario Lalli; Marlon King; Nick Hannon; Blake; Stevie B.
- Past members: Scott Reeder; Wendy Rae Fowler
- Website: sonsofalphacentauri.co.uk/yawningsons

Yawning Sons is a British–American collaborative musical project formed in 2008 by members of the psychedelic rock bands Yawning Man and Sons of Alpha Centauri. Often associated with the Palm Desert Scene, the project's nature has been compared to The Desert Sessions project founded by Josh Homme.

== History ==
In 2008 Yawning Man guitarist Gary Arce was invited to the United Kingdom by Sons of Alpha Centauri to produce new tracks, but upon arrival, the idea of simply producing the record was scrapped. Within one week, Arce and Sons of Alpha Centauri wrote and recorded an entire album's worth of material together.

The album, entitled Ceremony to the Sunset, was released on 23 July 2009 by Australian label Lexicon Devil Records. Receiving generally positive reviews, the album was placed eighth on The Obelisk's Top 10 Albums of 2009. A deluxe vinyl edition of the album was released by Alone Records in 2014. In 2010, in collaboration with WaterWays, a project that includes Arce, fellow Yawning Man member Mario Lalli and Fatso Jetson drummer Tony Tornay, the group followed up with a split EP entitled Yawning Sons/WaterWays that also received generally favourable reviews. The album was mastered at Abbey Road Studios in London and released by Space Age & Cheesecake Records on 24 December 2010.

In April 2013 Yawning Sons performed on the main stage on the opening night of the London DesertFest alongside Yawning Man and Fatso Jetson. However, they had to cut their set short due to technical difficulties with Arce's guitar, only able to deliver full performances of "Meadows" and "Ghostship/Deadwater".

On 26 March 2021 Yawning Sons released their second album, Sky Island.

== Members ==
Current members

- Gary Arce – guitar, lapsteel
- Mario Lalli – vocals
- Marlon King – guitar
- Nick Hannon – bass
- Blake – keyboards
- Stevie B. – drums

Former members

- Scott Reeder – vocals
- Wendy Rae Fowler – vocals

== Discography ==
Studio albums

- Ceremony to the Sunset (2009)
- Ceremony to the Sunset (vinyl re-release) (2014)
- Sky Island (2021)

Extended plays

- Yawning Sons/WaterWays (with WaterWays) (2010)
