= Sons of Alpha Centauri =

English rock band

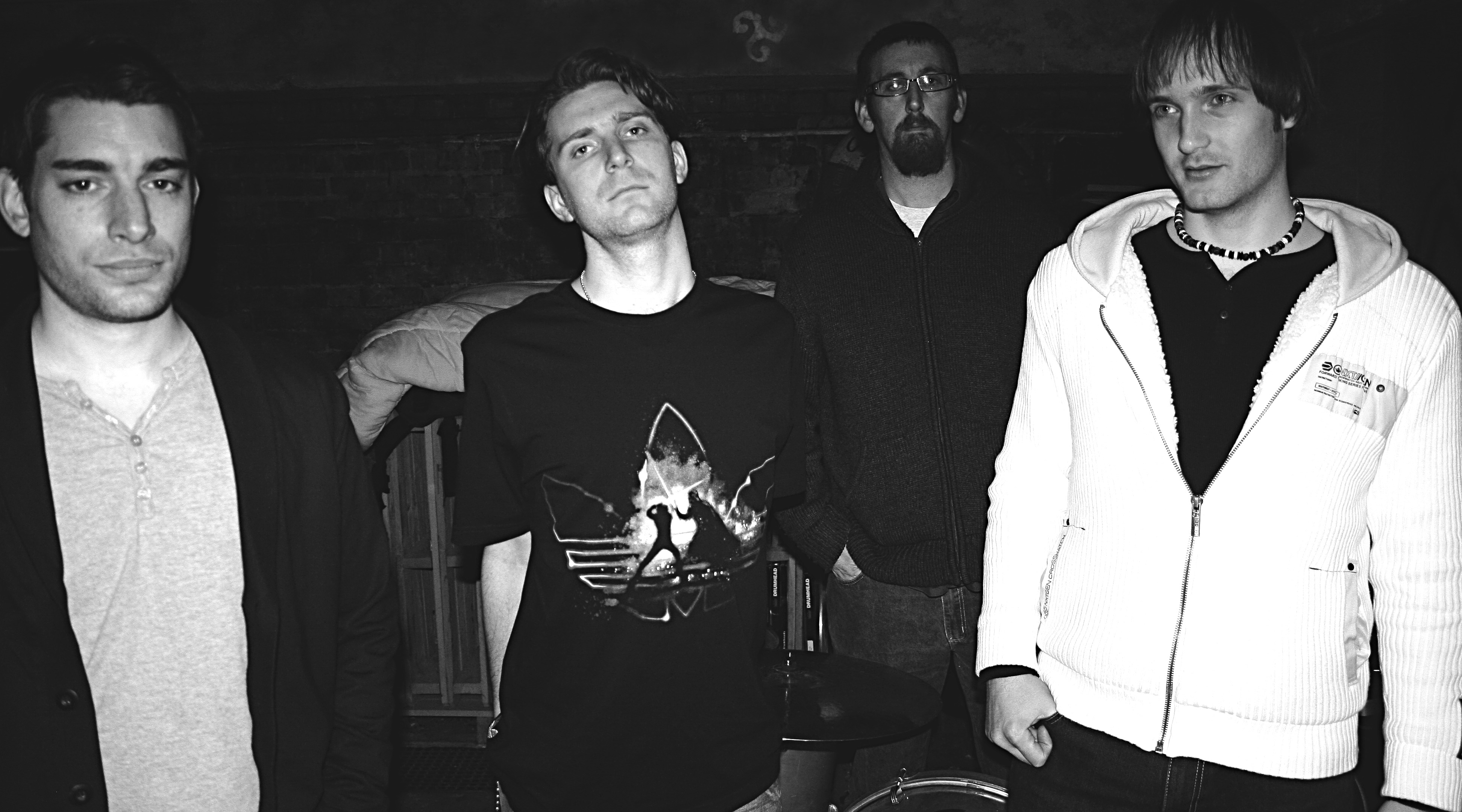
- Sons of Alpha Centauri in 2010

Background information
- Origin: Swale, Kent, England
- Genres: Post-rock; post-metal; stoner rock; space rock; ambient
- Years active: 2001–present
- Labels: Sound Devastation; Underdogma; H42 Records
- Spinoffs: Yawning Sons
- Members: Nick Hannon; Marlon King; Mitch Wheeler; Jonah Matranga
- Website: sonsofalphacentauri.co.uk

Sons of Alpha Centauri (sometimes abbreviated to SOAC) is an English rock band based in Swale, Kent. Founded in 2001 by Nick Hannon and Marlon King, the band has developed and borrowed from a range of styles from the 1970s through to the 1990s including stoner rock, desert rock, post-metal and the New wave of British heavy metal, as well as British artists as Black Sabbath and Pink Floyd. They were originally an instrumental band, but started to add vocals into their music since their third studio album Push in 2021.

Sons of Alpha Centauri are mostly noted for their ongoing collaborations and aversion to public performances, having performed under 20 gigs since their formation in 2001, of which six have been at the Camden Underworld in London. Their eponymously titled debut studio album Sons of Alpha Centauri was released in 2007, with common themes for the band including outer space, World War III and environmental preservation.

== Etymology ==
The band name "Sons of Alpha Centauri" is aligned on identity with Alpha Centauri, the closest star system to the Solar System, and that "sons" can be interpreted as "suns" to give additional meaning.

== History ==
=== 2001–2007: Formation and Sons of Alpha Centauri ===
Sons of Alpha Centauri was formed by Nick Hannon and Marlon King on 27 July 2001 in Faversham, Kent. The duo formed the band after becoming dissatisfied with a band called Pariah, which they were a part of at the time, and wrote a number of tracks together before inviting Stevie B. and Blake, who had previously worked together in a band called Negative Noise Orchestra, to join the group in 2004. Tracks were composed as numbers (to correspond with their chronological order) and were instrumental from the outset, with the band describing themselves as "not-for-profit equal opportunities". Critics have traced this back to the instrumental rock band Karma to Burn and their influence on the band's work.

A two-track demo released in 2004 saw very limited distribution (only 13 copies), and from 2004 to 2007, Sons of Alpha Centauri sporadically performed around Kent with fellow Kent-based band Bossk. In 2005 and 2006, the band also collaborated with Australian photographer and artist Seldon Hunt. In 2007, the band released its debut studio album, entitled Sons of Alpha Centauri, through Sound Devastation Records on 26 November 2007.

=== 2008–present: Collaborations and second studio album ===
Since 2008, Sons of Alpha Centauri have largely been involved in collaborative projects, but since 2014 have stated that they would not be involved in any more until after the release of their second album. In September 2012, the band announced that "Phase II" would be "coming soon"; press notes for the third Karma to Burn/Sons of Alpha Centauri vinyl release stated that the band had completed their "six vinyl release" that they were "moving from Phase I to Phase II". The band has denied on multiple occasions that the project is stuck in development hell.

On 1 April 2018 the band released a teaser trailer that announced a new project. This was later confirmed on the 14 April as the band's second album, entitled Continuum. The album was released on 1 June 2018 by H42 Records.

A third album, Push was released in August 2021 and saw the band depart from their trademark instrumental sound with the addition of guest vocalist Jonah Matranga (Far, onelinedrawing, Gratitude) alongside Will Haven drummer, Mitch Wheeler. Fourth album Pull was released in March 2024, which contains vocals as well and this time Jonah Matranga is featured as a full time member of the band.

== Band members ==
Current members

- Nick Hannon – bass (2001–present)
- Marlon King – guitar (2001–present)
- Mitch Wheeler – drums (2024–present)
- Jonah Matranga – vocals (2024–present)

=== Former members ===
- Blake – textures (2001–2024)
- Stevie B. – drums (2001–2024)

== Discography ==
Studio albums

- Sons of Alpha Centauri (2007)
- Last Day of Summer (with Treasure Cat) (2009)
- Continuum (2018)
- Push (2021)
- Pull (2024)

Compilations

- Karma to Burn/Sons of Alpha Centauri: The Definitive 7" Trilogy (2017)

Split singles

- "Sons of Alpha Centauri/A Death Cinematic" (with A Death Cinematic) (2010)
- "WaterWays/Sons of Alpha Centauri/Hotel Wrecking City Traders" (with WaterWays and Hotel Wrecking City Traders) (2012)
