= Year Long Disaster =

American rock band (2004–2011)

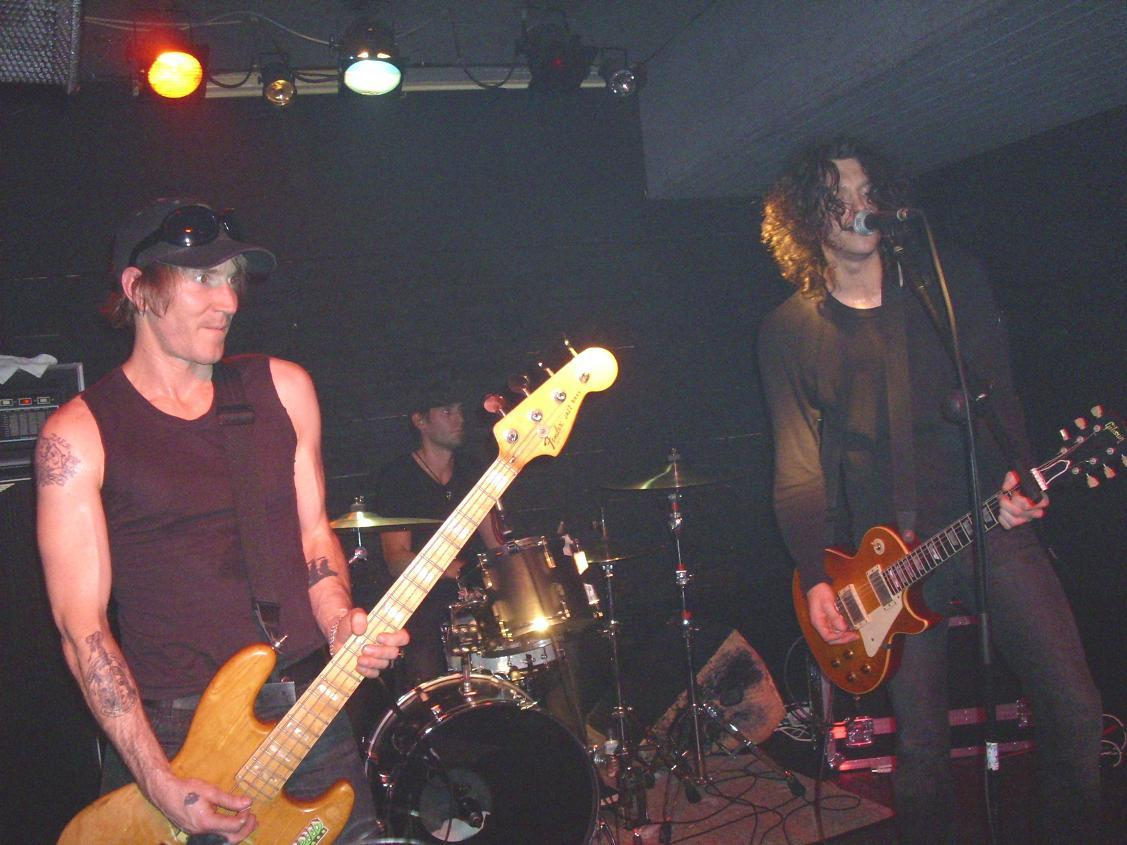
- Year Long Disaster in 2008. From left to right: Rich Mullins, Brad Hargreaves and Daniel Davies

Background information
- Origin: Los Angeles, California, U.S.
- Genres: Hard rock; blues rock; southern rock; alternative rock; stoner rock
- Years active: 2004–2011
- Label: Volcom
- Spinoff of: Karma to Burn; Third Eye Blind
- Past members: Daniel Davies; Rich Mullins; Brad Hargreaves; Rob Oswald; Will Mecum

Year Long Disaster was an American rock band from Los Angeles. Formed in 2004, the band was composed of vocalist and guitarist Daniel Davies, bassist Rich Mullins and drummer Brad Hargreaves. Hargreaves was later replaced by Rob Oswald, and guitarist Will Mecum also joined in a later incarnation of the group.

== History ==
=== 2004–2009: Formation and debut album ===
Daniel Davies and Rich Mullins first met in November 2003, after the bassist had left Karma to Burn and was playing in the band Speedealer. After completing a drug rehabilitation program together, the pair met Brad Hargreaves in November 2004, and after an informal jam session formed Year Long Disaster later.

Year Long Disaster signed with Californian record label Volcom Entertainment in May 2007, quickly entering the studio with Tucson, Arizona-based producer Jim Waters and later joining Clutch on a month-long United States tour. The band also supported Norwegian punk rock outfit Turbonegro on the North American What Is Rock Tour, beginning in September 2007.

The band's debut album, Year Long Disaster, was released on August 21, 2007. In July 2008, Year Long Disaster contributed a cover version of the Iron Maiden track "Running Free" to the tribute album Maiden Heaven: A Tribute to Iron Maiden. Later in the year, the group toured with Motörhead alongside Misfits, Valient Thorr and Airbourne.

=== 2009–2011: Second album ===
In September 2009, it was reported that Year Long Disaster had begun recording its second studio album at Sound City Studios in Los Angeles, California with producer Nick Raskulinecz. Preceded by the single "Show Me Your Teeth", Black Magic; All Mysteries Revealed was released on March 9, 2010. The band also contributed a cover version of The Sword's "Maiden, Mother & Crone" to a split single with the Austin, Texas-based group, released by Volcom in March 2010.

Since touring with Karma to Burn members Rob Oswald and Will Mecum in 2010 and 2011, Year Long Disaster has remained inactive. Davies has since joined CKY in place of founding frontman Deron Miller, both in 2012 and in 2015.

== Band members ==
- Daniel Davies – vocals, guitar (2004–2011)
- Rich Mullins – bass (2004–2011)
- Brad Hargreaves – drums, percussion (2004–2010)
- Rob Oswald – drums (2010–2011)
- Will Mecum – guitar (2010–2011)

== Discography ==
Studio albums

- Year Long Disaster (2007)
- Black Magic; All Mysteries Revealed (2010)
