= Karma to Burn (Karma to Burn album) =

Studio album by Karma to Burn
- Released: February 25, 1997
- Genre: Stoner rock
- Length: 59:30
- Label: Roadrunner; Heavy Psych Sounds (2022 reissue)
- Producer: Karma to Burn; Daniel Wise; Steven Haigler

Karma to Burn chronology
Karma to Burn (1997)	Wild, Wonderful Purgatory (1999)

Professional ratings
Review scores
Source	Rating
AllMusic	4/5 stars
Sea of Tranquility	3/5 stars
Sputnikmusic	5/5 stars

Karma to Burn is the debut studio album by Karma to Burn. It was released on February 25, 1997, on Roadrunner Records. There are several different versions and pressings—vinyl and cassette included— some of which appeared on Sony. The album was reissued on March 11, 2022, by Heavy Psych Sounds Records, highlighting its 25th anniversary.

== Track listing ==
All tracks are written by Karma to Burn, except track 7.

No.	Title	Length
1.	"Ma Petite Mort"	4:09
2.	"Bobbi, Bobbi, Bobbi – I'm Not God"	2:59
3.	"Patty Hearst's Closet Mantra"	5:13
4.	"Mt. Penetrator"	4:36
5.	"Eight"	4:39
6.	"Appalachian Woman"	3:50
7.	"Twenty Four Hours" (Joy Division cover)	5:00
8.	"Six-Gun Sucker Punch"	4:08
9.	"Thirteen"	3:47
10.	"(Waltz of the) Playboy Pallbearers"	3:36
11.	"Twin Sisters and Half a Bottle of Bourbon"	3:55
12.	"Six" (ends at 3:52)	14:04
Total length:		59:30

== Personnel ==
- Will Mecum (credited as "William") – guitar
- Rich Mullins (credited as "Dickie") – bass, backing vocals
- Jason Jarosz (credited as "J. Jarosz") – lead vocals
- Nathan Limbaugh – drums (all tracks except track 7)
- Chuck Nicholas (credited as "Nicholas") – drums (track 7)
- Octavia Lambertis – additional vocals (track 2)
