= Karma to Burn =

American rock band

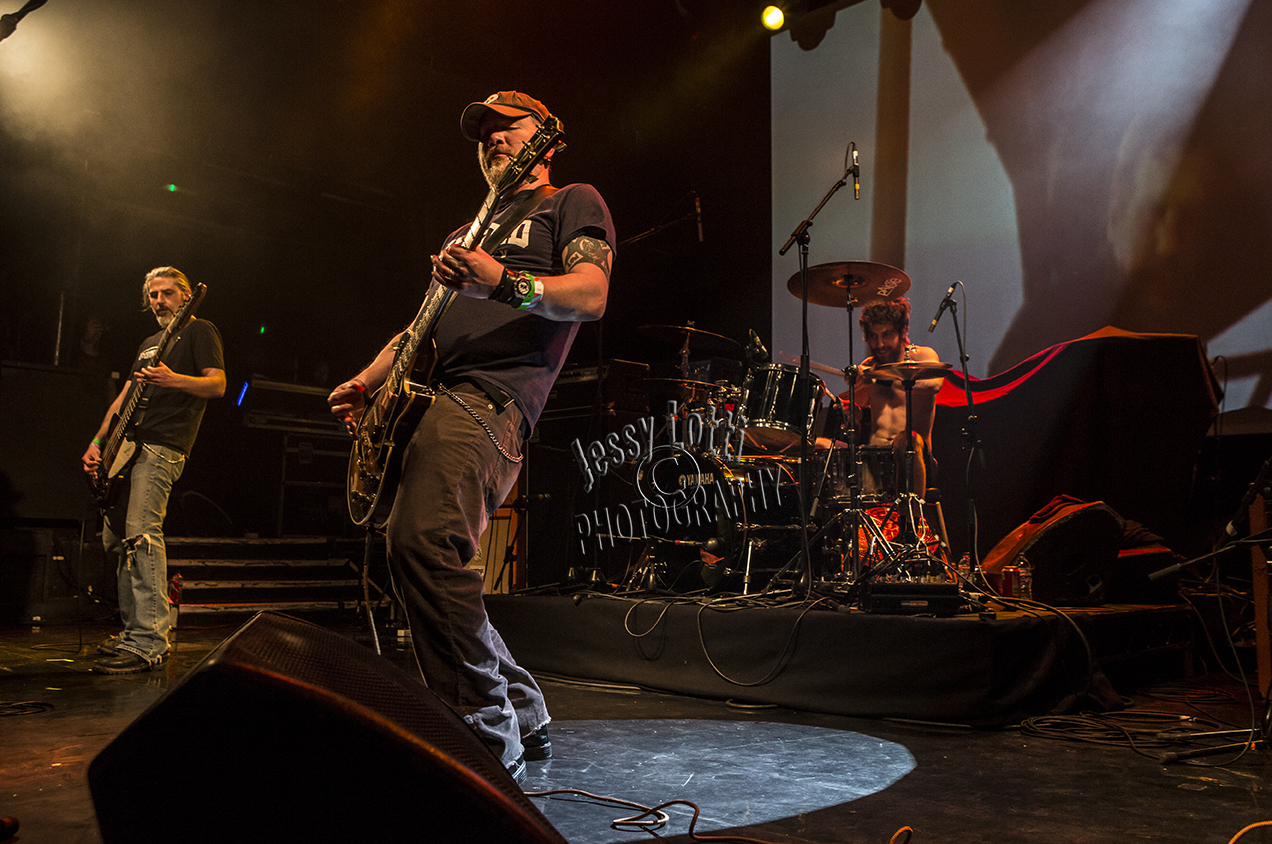
- Karma to Burn performing at KOKO in 2015; left to right: Eric Clutter, Will Mecum and Evan Devine

Background information
- Origin: Morgantown, West Virginia, U.S.
- Genres: Desert rock; stoner rock; instrumental rock; acid rock; heavy metal
- Years active: 1993–2002, 2009–2021
- Labels: Roadrunner; Spitfire; Napalm; Emetic; Rodeostar; Heavy Psych Sounds
- Spinoffs: Year Long Disaster; Treasure Cat; Dragon Ass
- Past members: Will Mecum; Rich Mullins; Rob Oswald; Evan Devine; Eric Clutter; Daniel Davies; Nathan Limbaugh; Jason Jarosz; John Garcia; Rob Halkett; Chuck Nicholas; Jim Davison
- Website: http://www.k2burn.net/

Karma to Burn (commonly abbreviated as K2B) was an American rock band from Morgantown, West Virginia. The band was noted for its heavy, mostly instrumental sound.

Their name comes from a sleevenote on Bob Dylan's 1976 album Desire which reads "I have a brother or two and a whole lot of karma to burn..."

== History ==
=== First era (1993–2002) ===
After years of viral self-promotion (such as phoning record companies pretending to be other bands who had heard an interesting band called Karma to Burn), Karma to Burn was signed to Roadrunner Records in 1996. They were planning to release an entirely instrumental album, but Roadrunner insisted that the contract was only valid under the condition that they hired a vocalist. After a brief trial of then Kyuss frontman John Garcia, they hired a friend of theirs, Jason Jarosz. Their first album Karma to Burn was released in 1997, and despite critical acclaim, sold poorly. The band decided to sack Jarosz and as such were fired from Roadrunner. The band continued, releasing 1999's Wild, Wonderful Purgatory and 2001's Almost Heathen as entirely instrumental albums.

The band unofficially disbanded sometime in mid-2002, when bassist Rich Mullins joined the band Speedealer. As of 2008, Mullins was playing in the Los Angeles based band Year Long Disaster, Oswald was the drummer in Nebula, and Will Mecum was playing guitar for Treasure Cat.

=== Reunion (2009–2010) ===
On February 23, 2009, Karma to Burn reformed with the lineup being the same as when they disbanded. They toured extensively, hitting both the US and Europe. Their European tour included a second stage slot at the Download Festival, which has now become infamous for the wasp swarm above the crowd throughout. A year after reuniting, Karma to Burn were in the stages of finishing a fourth album, which was produced by Scott Reeder formerly of the stoner rock band Kyuss. The album, Appalachian Incantation, was released in April 2010, and included two vocal tracks: 'Waiting on the Western World', featuring Year Long Disaster vocalist and guitarist Daniel Davies, and 'Two Times,' featuring former Kyuss vocalist John Garcia. The rest of the album consisted of instrumental selections. The band toured Europe after its release, including a nine date UK run supported by bassist Mullins's other band, Year Long Disaster.

=== Merger with Year Long Disaster (2010–2011) ===
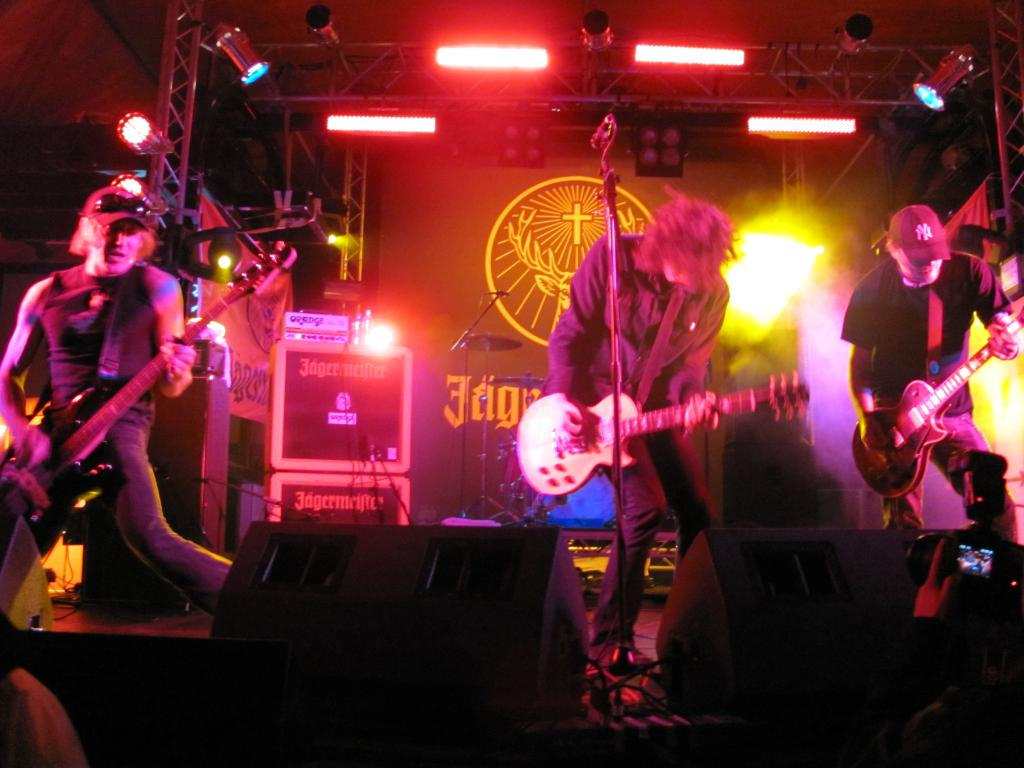
Karma to Burn with vocalist Daniel Davies at Sonisphere Knebworth 2010.

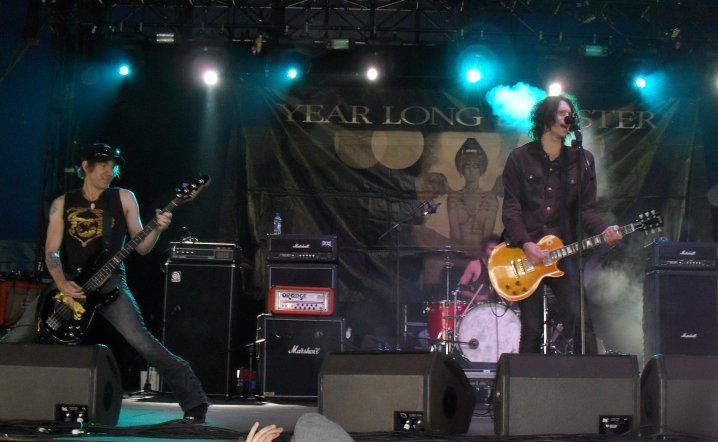
Year Long Disaster play Download Festival 2010 with all members of K2B as the backing band.

In a May 2010 interview with Uber Rock, Daniel Davies commented on a planned merger between the bands Year Long Disaster and Karma to Burn:

"The bands are starting to kind of merge together. We wrote that song together and we liked it so we're thinking that maybe we should write some more songs together. I think that is where it's leading to now."

In June 2010, Year Long Disaster toured Europe with all three members of Karma to Burn as part of the band. The favour was returned on Karma to Burn's European summer tour, with Davies stepping in as an occasional guitarist (and, when needed, vocalist) for the band. Karma to Burn then announced it plans to record a swift follow-up to Appalachian Incantation with an album featuring several songs with vocals by Davies, to be released in 2011, further blurring the boundaries between it and Year Long Disaster. The speculation as to whether Davies had joined the band was confirmed by his inclusion in the band picture on K2B's website and, more solidly, by Rich Mullins himself in an interview with Rock Radio.

K2B headlined the Jägermeister stage at the UK leg of Sonisphere Festival 2010., and supported The Sword on their 2010 winter US tour and in Europe the following November.

The follow-up to Appalachian Incantation, V, was recorded in February 2011, at Dave Grohl's Studio 606, and includes Davies' vocals on three songs, although he has since started a project outside Karma to Burn and left the group, returning the band to a trio. V was released in June 2011, followed by more extensive touring of the US and Europe. The band were also set to record a song for John Garcia's solo project, Garcia Vs. Garcia. On September 7, it was said via Twitter that Karma to Burn had finished recording three tracks with John Garcia, though for which projects was left unclear.

=== New lineup and releases (2012–2020) ===
Evan Devine of Morgantown metal band Ancient Shores filled in on drums for Karma to Burn during their 2012 European tour and became a full-time member after.

Their album Arch Stanton was released in 2014 on FABA/Deepdive Records. It featured the duo of Mecum and Devine, with Mecum taking up guitar and bass duties after the departure of Mullins.

The Karma to Burn EP, Mountain Czar, was released in 2016. The release introduced Eric Clutter as full-time bassist.

A split compilation album, Karma to Burn / Sons of Alpha Centauri was released in 2017.

=== Mecum's death and legacy (2021–present) ===
Guitarist Will Mecum died on April 29, 2021, after sustaining traumatic head injuries in an accidental fall. As of the time of his death, he was the last remaining founding member in the lineup of the band.

Following the news, former bassist Rich Mullins announced plans to release one last Karma to Burn album, consisting of unreleased material recorded by the band's original lineup. The compilation album Thee Rabbit Hole was released the same year.

The band has continued to remain active on social media since Mecum's passing. Much of the band's discography has been repressed by Heavy Psych Sounds Records, with each reissue being dedicated to the memory of Mecum.

== Band members ==
Final lineup

- Will Mecum – guitar
- Evan Devine – drums
- Eric Clutter – bass

Former

- Rich Mullins – bass
- Rob Oswald – drums
- Daniel Davies – vocals, guitar
- Jason Jarosz – vocals
- John Garcia – vocals
- Nathan Limbaugh – drums
- Chuck Nicholas – drums
- Jim Davison – vocals, guitar
- Rob Halkett – bass
- Karim Chatila – vocals

== Discography ==
=== Studio albums ===
- Karma to Burn (Roadrunner Records, 1997)
- Wild, Wonderful Purgatory (Roadrunner Records, 1999)
- Almost Heathen (Spitfire Records, 2001)
- Appalachian Incantation (Napalm Records, 2010)
- V (Napalm Records, 2011)
- Arch Stanton (FABA/Deepdive Records, 2014)

=== Live albums ===
- Live in Brussel (FABA Records, 2013)

=== EPs ===
- Split 7" with ASG (Volcom Entertainment Vinyl Club, 2009)
- Split 7" with ÖfÖ Am (French instrumental band) (Napalm Records, 2010)
- Split 7" with Sons of Alpha Centauri (Kitchen Dweller Records, 2010)
- Incantation's Ingredients (Napalm Records, 2010)

(Incantation's Ingredients was a tour EP, sold on K2B's pre Appalachian Incantation release tours. It featured several tracks off the album.)

- Karma to Burn (Heavy Psych Sounds Records, 2013)
- Split 7" with Sons of Alpha Centauri (H42 Records, 51/73 2014)
- Split 7" with Sons of Alpha Centauri (H42 Records, Six/66 2015)
- Split 7" with Sons of Alpha Centauri (H42 Records, Six/66 DesertFest London Edition 2015)
- Split 7" with Sons of Alpha Centauri (H42 Records, Fourteen/65 2015 Repress of 2010 7")
- Mountain Czar (SPV/Rodeostar Records, 2016)

=== Compilation albums ===
- Mountain Mama′s – A collection of the works of Karma to Burn (Roadrunner Records, 2007-Limited Edition to 2000 copies)
- Live in London & Chasing the Dragon (DRP Records, 2009-Limited Edition to 250 copies)
- Karma to Burn: Slight Reprise (Maybe Records, 2012)
- Karma to Burn/Sons of Alpha Centauri: The Definitive 7" Trilogy (H42 Records, 2017)
- Thee Rabbit Hole (H42 Records, 2021)

=== Videos ===
- Live 2009 - Reunion Tour (A collection of 2009 footage, also includes bonus videos shot between 1997 and 1999)
