= Will Mecum =

American musician (1972–2021)

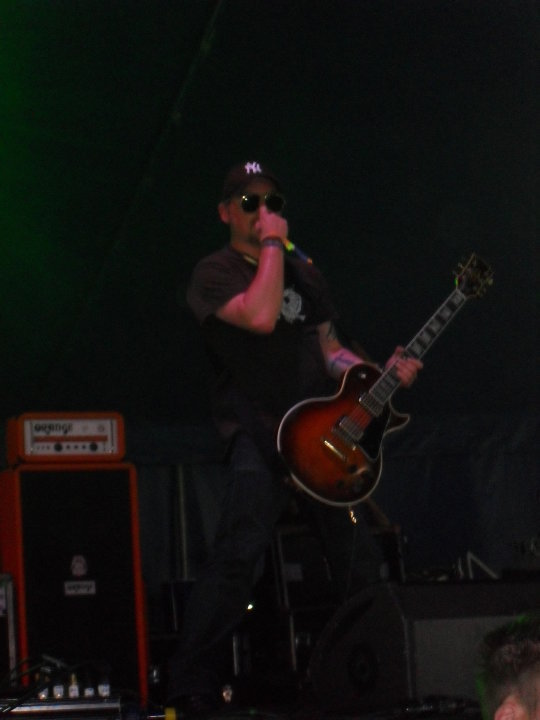
- Mecum in 2010

Background information
- Birth name: William Charles Mecum
- Born: May 4, 1972
- Died: April 29, 2021 (aged 48); Morgantown, West Virginia, U.S.
- Genres: Stoner rock; rock
- Occupation: Musician
- Instruments: Guitar; drums
- Years active: 1990–2021
- Formerly of: Admiral; Red Oak Conspiracy; Karma to Burn; Year Long Disaster; Treasure Cat; Dragon Ass

William Charles Mecum (May 4, 1972 – April 29, 2021) was an American musician and lead guitarist for the rock band Karma to Burn (K2B). During K2B's seven-year hiatus from 2002–2009, he played guitar for instrumental bands Treasure Cat and Dragon Ass. He also played drums in the band Admiral prior to forming Karma to Burn. He lived in West Virginia. Mecum died on April 29, 2021, as a result of a traumatic head injury from an accidental fall. As of the time of his death, he was the last remaining founding member in the lineup of the band.

== Discography ==
=== Admiral ===
- Admiral (1990)
- Revolving and Loading (1991)

=== Karma to Burn ===
- Karma to Burn (Roadrunner Records, 1997)
- Wild, Wonderful Purgatory (Roadrunner Records, 1999)
- Almost Heathen (Spitfire Records, 2001)
- Appalachian Incantation (Napalm Records, 2010)
- V (Napalm Records, 2011)
- Karma to Burn: Slight Reprise (2012, Maybe Records)
- Karma to Burn (2013, Heavy Psych Sounds Records)
- Arch Stanton (FABA/Deepdive Records, 2014)
- Mountain Czar (Rodeostar Records, 2016)
- Karma to Burn/Sons of Alpha Centauri: The Definitive 7" Trilogy (H42 Records, 2017)
- Thee Rabbit Hole (H42 Records, 2021)

=== Treasure Cat ===
- Treasure Cat EP (2006)
- Choice Cuts (2007)
