= List of occult rock bands =

This is a list of occult rock bands. Occult rock is a proto-metal style of rock music.

- Acid King
- Antonius Rex
- Aphrodite's Child
- Bang
- Black Sabbath
- Black Widow
- Blood Ceremony
- Bloody Hammers
- Blue Öyster Cult
- Chelsea Wolfe
- Christian Mistress
- Coven
- Death SS
- The Devil's Blood
- Earthless
- Ghost
- Goblin
- Graham Bond
- Graveyard
- Hawkwind
- In Solitude
- Jacula
- Jess and the Ancient Ones
- Jex Thoth
- Kadavar
- Lucifer
- Luciferian Light Orchestra
- The Obsessed
- Pagan Altar
- Pentagram
- Puppy
- Purson
- Roky Erickson and the Aliens
- Rose Kemp
- Royal Thunder
- The Skull
- Uncle Acid & the Deadbeats
- Warlord
- Windhand
- Witchcraft
- Witchfinder General
- Witchfynde
- Witch Mountain
- Writing on the Wall
