= Tardo Pede In Magiam Versus =

Studio album by Jacula
- Released: 1972
- Recorded: 1972
- Studio: Studio Angelicum, Milan, Italy
- Label: Black Widow Records
- Producer: Jacula

Tardo Pede In Magiam Versus is an album by the Italian rock band Jacula. The album was recorded in Milan, Italy. Gualtiero Guerrini and others helped with the recording in Studio Angelicum, which had a church organ. After the limited release of the album in 1972, the changed its name to Antonius Rex, maintaining the same lineup of Jacula. "U.F.D.E.M." reappears in remixed form as "Morte Al Potere" on Antonious Rex's 1977 Zora album, the new version featuring newly recorded overdubs with the original 1972 version as the basic track. He did not record again as Jacula until Pre Viam in 2011.

Tardo Pede In Magiam Versus was re-released in 2007 by Black Widow Records.

== Track listing ==
Vinyl

Side One

1. U.F.D.E.M. (9:02)
2. Praesentia Domini (10:58)

Side Two

1. Jacula Valzer (6:21)
2. Long Black Magic Night (6:21)
3. In Old Castle (9:36)

CD

1. U.F.D.E.M. (9:02)
2. Praesentia Domini (10:58)
3. Jacula Valzer (6:21)
4. Absolution (8.27)
5. Long Black Magic Night (6:21)
6. In Old Castle (9:36)

Note
"Absolution" is a bonus track which was recorded in 1981.

== Personnel ==
- Antonio Bartoccetti – vocals, guitars, bass guitar
- Fiamma Dello Spirito – lead vocals, violin, flute, Moog synthesizer
- Charles Tiring – pipe organ, piano, harpsichord, Moog synthesizer
