= Jex Thoth =

Doom metal band

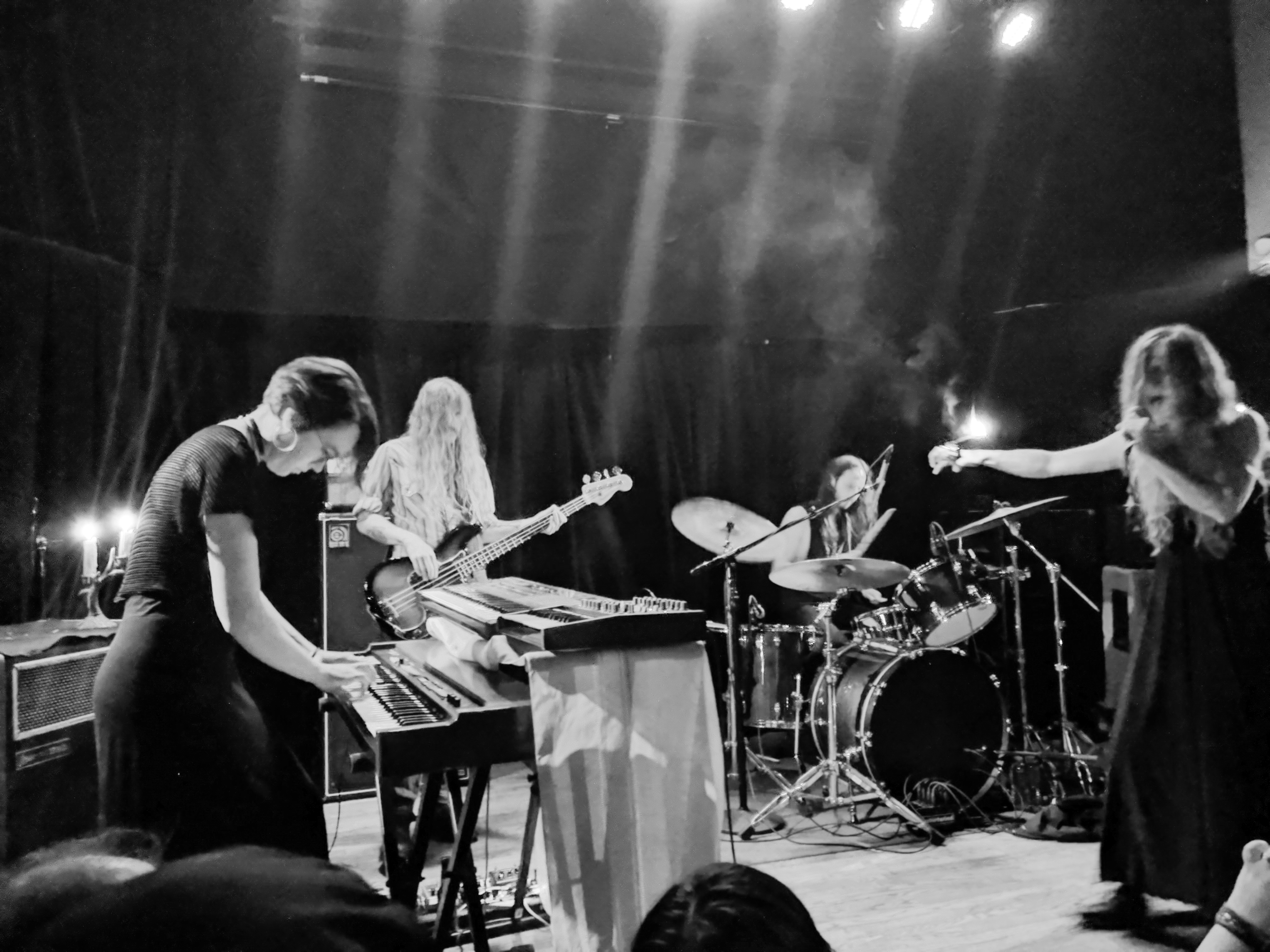

Background information
- Origin: Madison, Wisconsin, United States
- Genres: Doom metal, occult rock
- Years active: 2007-present
- Label: I Hate

Jex Thoth is a doom metal band from Madison, Wisconsin, signed to the Swedish record label I Hate Records. Since 2007 they have released two full-length studio albums, three EPs and a split with Pagan Altar. They have toured Europe every year from 2010–2018.

== Discography ==
- Pagan Altar / Jex Thoth (split album with Pagan Altar, 2007)
- Jex Thoth (full-length, 2008)
- Totem (EP, 2009)
- Witness (EP, 2010)
- Blood Moon Rise (full-length, 2013)
- Circles (EP, 2013)
