= Anders Manga =

American recording artist

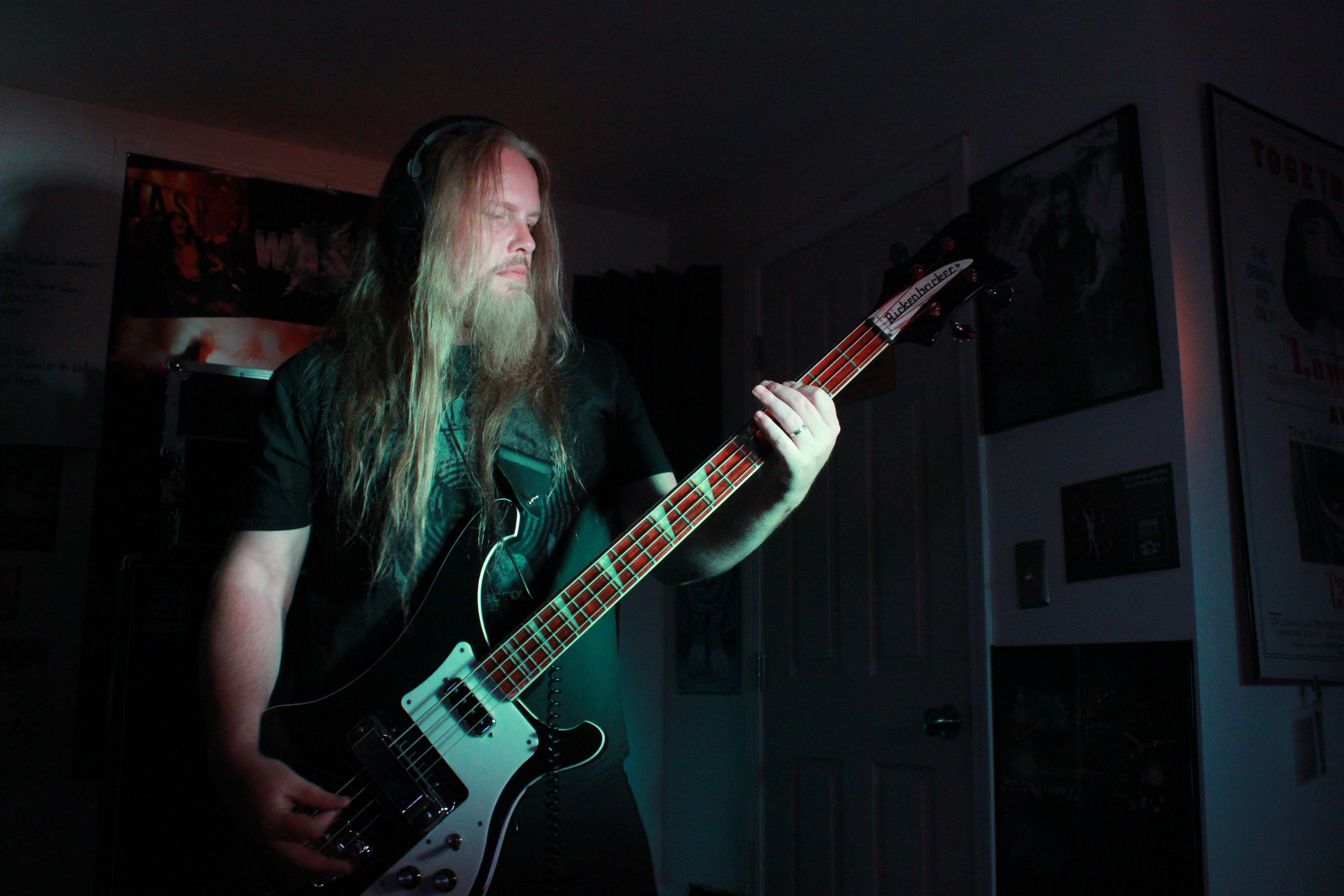

Background information
- Origin: United States
- Genres: Dark wave, death rock
- Years active: 2000–present
- Label: Napalm Records
- Website: www.andersmanga.com

Anders Manga is an American recording artist who has been active in the darkwave genre since the late 1990s, and is also known for performing with his wife, Devallia, in the horror rock band Bloody Hammers.

== Music ==
=== 1990s: Early Experiments and Coffin Moth ===
Throughout the 1990s, Manga experimented with music production using affordable home recording gear such as a Fostex 4-track recorder and a drum machine. He began recording under the project Coffin Moth, with a lo-fi, DIY aesthetic influenced by deathrock and gothic rock. Songs like “Night of the Witch” and “This Damnation” were recorded during this period.

=== 2000s: Digital Breakthrough and Debut Releases ===
In 2002, Manga connected with friend Jennifer Miro of The Nuns, who encouraged him to pursue online music distribution. Using basic software and hardware—including a camcorder microphone—he recorded “Solitary Heaven,” “Shiver,” and “We Won’t Stay Dead.” His music was uploaded to platforms like MP3.com and Download.com, where it quickly gained popularity. He became the most downloaded artist in the "goth" section on Download.com.

His debut album, One Up for the Dying (2005), earned attention from DJs and goth clubs in both the U.S. and Europe. His live debut took place in 2005, performing at Philadelphia’s Dracula’s Ball. He assembled a live band, which included Scott Sunset, who would later go on to found the experimental electronic band Solemn Shapes.

In 2003, he met Devallia, who became a key creative partner. She initially worked on music videos and later joined his live band as a synthesizer player in 2006, debuting at Bar Sinister in Los Angeles. They became romantically involved and married after a performance at Convergence 12 in New Orleans.

=== 2006–2011: Continued Releases and Collaborations ===
Manga toured the United States and released several albums over the next few years, including Welcome to the Horror Show (2006), Blood Lush (2007), and X’s & the Eyes (2008). The latter included the track “There Will Be Blood,” which entered the Top 20 on the German Alternative Charts.

Manga was nominated for Band of the Year by readers of Gothic Beauty Magazine in 2007. His music has been featured in horror movies and television series such as The Vampire Diaries and has charted in the German Alternative Charts.

=== 2012–Present: Bloody Hammers, Terrortron, and Return to Darkwave ===
In 2012, Manga launched Bloody Hammers, a heavy rock project that integrated doom, gothic, and horror elements. The debut Bloody Hammers album led to a contract with Napalm Records. The project attracted a different fanbase than his darkwave work, aligning more with the Occult Rock and metal scenes. The band performed at major festivals including Download Festival (UK) and Out & Loud (Germany).

In 2015, Manga started the instrumental project Terrortron, inspired by horror film scores from the 1970s and 1980s. Releases such as Hexed (2015), Necrophiliac Among the Living Dead (2016), and Orgy of the Vampires (2017) showcased his cinematic style and earned recognition from outlets like Rue Morgue Magazine.

Manga returned to his solo darkwave material in 2018 with Perfectly Stranger. Despite initial expectations that the scene had moved on, the album gained attention, particularly the tracks “Witchcraft” and “Welcome to Darkness.” His 2020 album Andromeda featured “Rosaries and Requiems” and “Serpentine,” two of his most streamed songs to date.

In 2019, The Summoning was released by Bloody Hammers, featuring the single “Let Sleeping Corpses Lie,” which became the band's biggest hit. A tour was planned for 2020 but was canceled due to the COVID-19 pandemic.

In 2021, Songs of Unspeakable Terror, a horror-punk album influenced by the Ramones and Misfits, was released under the Bloody Hammers name. In 2022, Manga and Napalm Records mutually ended their contract, and he began self-releasing music. The crowdfunded album Washed in the Blood met its funding goal within a day.

Since 2023, Manga has focused on releasing singles rather than albums. Tracks like “Adrift” (2023) and material from the 2024 singles collection album, "Darker Than You Think" have become some of his most streamed. He continues to release new music, including his 2025 single “Crucified.”

== Musical Influences ==
His early musical interests were sparked in 1980 upon hearing Gary Numan's “Cars” on the radio. He later became influenced by horror films, particularly after watching Shock Theater reruns on late night local TV in the early 1980s.

Anders identifies David Bowie as having been his main musical influence as a child. Other artists such as Bauhaus, Gary Numan, Alice Cooper, Roky Erickson, The Sisters of Mercy and Black Sabbath also had a major influence on his musical tastes.

== Personal life ==
Anders Manga was born at High Point Regional Hospital in High Point, North Carolina. At the age of four, he lost his father, a former Golden Gloves boxer, in a hit-and-run incident. The deaths of both grandfathers followed soon after, each linked to alcoholism. At age 15, Manga lost his mother to a fatal combination of prescribed medications.

Anders Manga is married to Devallia since 2006, who collaborates with him on all of his major musical projects, including live performances and music videos. The couple lives and records music together in North Carolina, often transforming their home into a DIY studio space for both audio and visual productions.

== Discography ==
=== Coffin Moth ===
- Coffin Moth (1997) (Self Released)

=== Solo releases ===
- Murder in the Convent (1999) (Vampture)
- One Up for the Dying (2004) (Vampture)
- Left of an All-Time Low (2005) (Vampture)
- Welcome to the Horror Show (2006) (Vampture)
- Blood Lush (2007) (Vampture)
- X's & the Eyes (2008) (Vampture)
- Perfectly Stranger (2018) (Sacrificial Records)
- Andromeda (2020)
- Darker than You Think (2024)

=== Bloody Hammers ===
- Bloody Hammers (2012) (SoulSeller Records)
- Spiritual Relics (2013) (SoulSeller Records)
- Under Satan's Sun (2014) (Napalm Records)
- Lovely Sort of Death (2016) (Napalm Records)
- The Horrific Case of Bloody Hammers (2016) (Napalm Records)
- The Summoning (2019) (Napalm Records)
- Songs of Unspeakable Terror (2021) (Napalm Records)
- Washed In the Blood (2022) (Sacrificial Records)
- The Acoustic Halloween Special (2025) (Sacrificial Records)

=== Terrortron ===
- Hexed (2015) (Sacrificial Records)
- Necrophiliac Among the Living Dead (2016) (Sacrificial Records)
- Orgy of the Vampires (2017) (Sacrificial Records)

=== Other releases ===
- Interbreeding VIII: Elements of Violence (2006) (BLC Productions)
- Sweet Leaf - A Tribute to Black Sabbath (2015) (Cleopatra Records)
