= Antonius Rex =

Italian progressive rock band founded in 1974

- Origin: Milan, Italy
- Genres: Progressive rock; occult rock
- Years active: 1974–2017
- Label: Black Widow
- Spinoff of: Jacula
- Members: Antonio Bartoccetti; Rexanthony; Florian Gorman; Monika Tasnad
- Past members: Franz Porthenzy; Doris Norton; Charles Tiring
- Website: www.antoniusrex.com

Antonius Rex was an Italian progressive rock band founded in 1974 in Milan by Antonio Bartoccetti.

== Biography ==
Jacula formed in 1968 and released its debut album, In Cauda Semper Stat Venenum, in 1969. After the release of the 1972 album Tardo Pede In Magiam Versus, the band split up. Bandleader Bartoccetti then formed Antonius Rex in 1974 with new members, releasing eight albums under this name.

In 2011, the Bartoccetti released a new album under the Jacula name, Pre Viam.

== Discography ==
- 1977 - Zora
- 1978 - Ralefun
- 1991- Anno Demoni
- 1992 - Pig in the witch
- 2002 - Neque Semper Arcum Tendit Rex
- 2003 - Praeternatural
- 2005 - Magic Ritual
- 2006 - Switch On Dark
- 2009 - Per Viam
- 2012 - Hystero Demonopathy
