= Live in Antwerp =

Live In Antwerp

Live album by Kadavar
- Released: 6 June 2014
- Venue: Antwerp, Belgium
- Genre: Hard rock, psychedelic rock, stoner rock
- Length: 41:17
- Label: Nuclear Blast

Kadavar chronology
Abra Kadavar (2013)	Live In Antwerp (2014)	Berlin (2015)

Live in Antwerp is a live album by German rock band Kadavar, released on 6 June 2014 by Nuclear Blast. It was their first live album and fourth album overall. The record featured live versions of 11 tracks that originally appeared on the studio albums Kadavar and Abra Kadavar, performed and recorded at various live shows in Antwerp, Belgium.

== Track listing ==
No.	Title	Length
1.	"All Our Thoughts"	6:04
2.	"Living in Your Head"	7:11
3.	"Doomsday Machine"	4:56
4.	"Black Sun"	7:13
5.	"Eye of the Storm"	6:20
6.	"Broken Wings"	5:44
7.	"Come Back Life"	5:22
8.	"Purple Sage"	11:03
9.	"Creature of the Demon"	4:53
10.	"Goddess of Dawn"	6:27
11.	"Forgotten Past"	7:17

== Personnel ==
Kadavar

- Christoph Lindemann – vocals, electric guitar
- Simon Bouteloup – bass
- Christoph Bartelt – drums, percussion
