= Mirror of Deception =

German doom metal band

- Origin: Göppingen, Germany
- Genres: Doom metal
- Years active: 1990–present
- Labels: Cyclone Empire; The Miskatonic Foundation; Final Chapter Records; Iron Glory Records
- Members: Michael Siffermann (vocals, guitar); Jochen Fopp (guitar); Andreas Taller (bass); Jochen Müller (drums)
- Past members: Markus Baumhauer (vocals); Klaus Shmidt (bass); Rainer Hampel (bass); Gunnar Drescher (drums); Ingo Häderle (drums)
- Website: www.mirrorofdeception.de

Mirror of Deception is German doom metal band, formed in 1990.

== Biography ==
Along with Dawn of Winter, Mirror of Deception is Germany's longest running traditional doom act. The band was formed by guitarist Jochen Fopp (also founder and owner of the Doom Shall Rise festival) and guitarist/vocalist Michael Siffermann.

Mirror of Deception were unsigned during the 90s (except when releasing the EP titled Veil of Lead), they achieved cult underground status in their homeland. Demos recorded during this time were later released on the Past & Present compilation.

Their debut album Mirrorsoil was released 2001. After its release and tour, Mirror of Deception parted ways with original singer Markus Baumhauer, being replaced by guitarist Michael Siffermann. The band soon got signed to Richard Walker's (ex- Sore Throat, Solstice) label The Miskatonic Foundation and in 2003 released the EP Conversion.

== Discography ==
=== Albums ===
- Mirrorsoil, 2001 (Iron Glory)
- Foregone, 2004 (Final Chapter)
- Shards, 2006 (Cyclone Empire)
- A Smouldering Fire, 2010
- The Estuary, 2018 (End Of Green)
- Transience, 2026

=== EPs ===
- Veil Of Lead, 1997 (Sub Zero)
- Conversion, 2003 (The Miskatonic Foundation)
- Imperial Anthems split single: Pagan Altar - Portrait of Dorian Gray / Mirror of Deception - Beltaine's Joy, 2011 (Cyclone Empire)

=== Demos ===
- Mirror of Deception, 1993
- Words Unspoken, 1994
- Cease, 1996
- Veil Of Lead, 1996
- The Float Sessions, 1997

=== Compilations ===
- Past & Present, 2001 (self-released)
