= Writing on the Wall (band) =

- Also known as: The Jury
- Origin: Edinburgh, Scotland
- Genres: Occult rock
- Years active: 1968–1973
- Labels: Akarma Records, Middle Earth, Ork
- Past members: Willy Finlayson; Alby Greenhalgh; Jimmy Hush; Linnie Paterson; Bill Scott; Jack Scott; Robert "Smiggy" Smith

Writing on the Wall were a Scottish rock band of the late 1960s and early 1970s who became a popular live act in the United Kingdom.

The group originally formed as the Jury, changing their name to Writing on the Wall in early 1968. The band's manager, Brian Waldman, moved the group to London and let the band perform at his club, the Middle Earth. That same year, the band recorded a BBC radio session for disc jockey John Peel and made a live demo album as well.

They eventually recorded their lone album, The Power of the Picts in 1969, for Waldman's Middle Earth label. In 1971, the band did another session for John Peel and made an LP in Scotland that was never released in 1972, then went through several line-up changes. The group tried to record another album in Wales near the end of 1973, but gave up when their equipment was stolen in December of that year.

== Discography ==
- The Power of the Picts (1969)
