= Black Widow (Black Widow album) =

Studio album by Black Widow
- Released: 1971 (original release on CBS in various countries); reissued in 2005 on Air Mail Archive for Japan and Italy, and in 2006 on Repertoire Records for Germany
- Recorded: 1970–1971
- Genre: Hard rock, progressive rock
- Length: 47:50
- Label: CBS
- Producer: Patrick Meehan Jr.

Black Widow chronology
Sacrifice (1970)	Black Widow (1971)	III (1972)

Professional ratings
Review scores
Source	Rating
AllMusic	2.5/5 stars

Black Widow is the second album by English rock band Black Widow. It was issued in 1971 on CBS Records and was produced by Patrick Meehan Jr. On Black Widow, the occult-based lyrical themes that had dominated the band's debut disappeared.

== Track listing ==
1. "Tears & Wine" – 8:58 (Geoff Griffith, Jim Gannon, Kip Trevor, Romeo Challenger, Zoot Taylor)
2. "The Gypsy" – 4:33 (Gannon)
3. "Bridge Passage" – 0:30 (Griffith)
4. "When My Mind Was Young" – 5:12 (Griffith, Gannon)
5. "The Journey" – 5:52 (Gannon, Trevor, Taylor)
6. "Poser" – 7:46 (Griffith, Gannon, Trevor, Challenger, Taylor)
7. "Mary Clark" – 4:07 (Gannon, Bill Litchfield)
8. "Wait Until Tomorrow" – 3:24 (Gannon)
9. "An Afterthought" – 1:12 (Griffith, Gannon, Trevor, Challenger, Taylor)
10. "Legend of Creation" – 5:58 (Gannon)

== Personnel ==
- Kip Trevor – lead and backing vocals, maracas, tambourine
- Clive Jones – saxophone, flute
- Jim Gannon – lead, rhythm, acoustic and twelve-string guitars, backing vocals
- Zoot Taylor – organ, piano
- Geoff Griffith – bass, backing vocals
- Romeo Challenger – drums, percussion
