= Sacrifice (Black Widow album) =

Studio album by Black Widow
- Released: March 1970
- Genres: Occult rock, progressive rock
- Length: 43:44
- Label: CBS
- Producer: Patrick Meehan Jr.

Black Widow chronology
Sacrifice (1970)	Black Widow (1971)

Professional ratings
Review scores
Source	Rating
AllMusic	4/5 stars

Sacrifice is the debut album by English rock band Black Widow. It was issued in March 1970 through CBS Records and was produced by Patrick Meehan Jr. The album features the band's best known song "Come to the Sabbat" and its lyrical themes are centred on Satanism and occultism. Sacrifice reached No. 32 on the UK Albums Chart.

== Music ==
Musically, Sacrifice has been described as "a mix of primal, progressive rhythms and some altogether nasty occult overtures." The album is said to have an "eerie atmosphere."

== Legacy ==
Staff writers at Classic Rock Magazine expressed their belief that "the title track, 'Conjuration' and 'In Ancient Days' are the spiritual forerunners of black metal."

== Track listing ==
All songs written by Jim Gannon except where noted.

1. "In Ancient Days" – 7:40
2. "Way to Power" – 3:58
3. "Come to the Sabbat" (Gannon, Clive Jones) – 4:56
4. "Conjuration" – 5:45
5. "Seduction" – 5:38
6. "Attack of the Demon" – 5:37
7. "Sacrifice" – 11:10

== Personnel ==
- Kip Trevor – vocals
- Clive Jones – flute, saxophone, clarinet
- Jim Gannon – lead and Spanish guitars, vibes
- Zoot Taylor – organ, piano
- Bob Bond – bass
- Clive Box – drums, percussion
