= Pre Viam =

Studio album by Jacula
- Released: May 2011
- Genre: Occult rock; gothic rock
- Label: Black Widow Records
- Producer: Antonio Bartoccetti - Musik Research

Pre Viam is the third studio album by the Italian rock band Jacula, released in 2011 nearly four decades after previous work. In the interim, the band's leader, Antonio Bartoccetti, had formed a new band, Antonius Rex. When Bartoccetti brought Jacula back to the recording studio, the original organist, Charles Tiring, had been dead since 1979. Original keyboardist Doris Norton was replaced with Bartoccetti's son, Rexanthony.

== Track listing ==
LP-vinyl playlist:

1. Jacula Is Back
2. Pre Viam
3. Black Lady Kiss
4. Abandoned
5. Devien Folle
6. In Rain
7. Godwitch
8. Possaction

CD-Digipack playlist:

1. Jacula Is Back
2. Pre Viam
3. Black Lady Kiss
4. Devien Folle
5. In Rain
6. Godwitch
7. Possaction
8. 18 Veritates (VIDEO)

== Line-up 2011 ==
- Antonio Bartoccetti - vocals, guitars
- Rexanthony - piano, synthesiser, keyboards
- Florian Gormann - drums

=== Guest musicians ===
- Blacklady - vocals on "Blacklady Kiss", "In Rain" and "Godwitch"
- Katia Stazio - vocals on "Pre Viam" and "Deviens Folle"
