= In Cauda Semper Stat Venenum =

Studio album by Jacula
- Length: 37:26
- Producer: Jacula

In Cauda Semper Stat Venenum is an album by Italian rock band Jacula.

== Track listing ==
No.	Title	Length
1.	"Ritus"	4:06
2.	"Magister Dixit"	10:30
3.	"Triumphatus Sad"	3:35
4.	"Veneficium"	2:21
5.	"Initiatio"	6:49
6.	"In Cauda Semper Stat Venenum"	10:05

== Recording date ==
According to the band sources it was recorded and self-released by the band (on their Gnome label in 1969) in 300 copies "for distribution to friends and the occult community". In 2001 Black Widow Records released the album to the public market but Antonio Bartoccetti (guitarist and bandleader) claims the reissue (as he calls it) is highly edited with Pro Tools, distorted guitars and samplers. No copy of the original issue can be found to support his claims though (if it exists at all).

== Personnel ==
- Antonio Bartoccetti – guitar, bass guitar, vocals
- Charles Tiring – keyboards
- Doris Norton – drums, special effects, violin, flute, vocals
