= Rough Times (album) =

Studio album by Kadavar
- Released: 29 September 2017
- Length: 44:55
- Label: Nuclear Blast

Kadavar chronology
| Berlin (2015) | Rough Times (2017) | Live in Copenhagen (2018) |

Professional ratings
Review scores
| Source | Rating |
|---|---|
| Metal Injection | 8.5/10 |
| PopMatters | 3/10 |

Rough Times is the fourth studio album by German rock band Kadavar, released on 29 September 2017 by Nuclear Blast.

== Track listing ==
| No. | Title | Length |
|---|---|---|
| 1. | "Rough Times" | 3:38 |
| 2. | "Into the Wormhole" | 4:17 |
| 3. | "Skeleton Blues" | 4:24 |
| 4. | "Die Baby Die" | 4:18 |
| 5. | "Vampires" | 4:48 |
| 6. | "Tribulation Nation" | 5:04 |
| 7. | "Words of Evil" | 3:37 |
| 8. | "The Lost Child" | 5:52 |
| 9. | "You Found the Best in Me" | 4:58 |
| 10. | "A L'ombre du Temps" | 3:57 |

== Charts ==
| Chart (2018) | Peak position |
|---|---|
| Austrian Albums (Ö3 Austria) | 43 |
| Belgian Albums (Ultratop Flanders) | 189 |
| Belgian Albums (Ultratop Wallonia) | 68 |
| German Albums (Offizielle Top 100) | 30 |
| Swiss Albums (Schweizer Hitparade) | 71 |
| UK Rock & Metal Albums (OCC) | 34 |
