= Bloody Hammers =

American heavy metal band

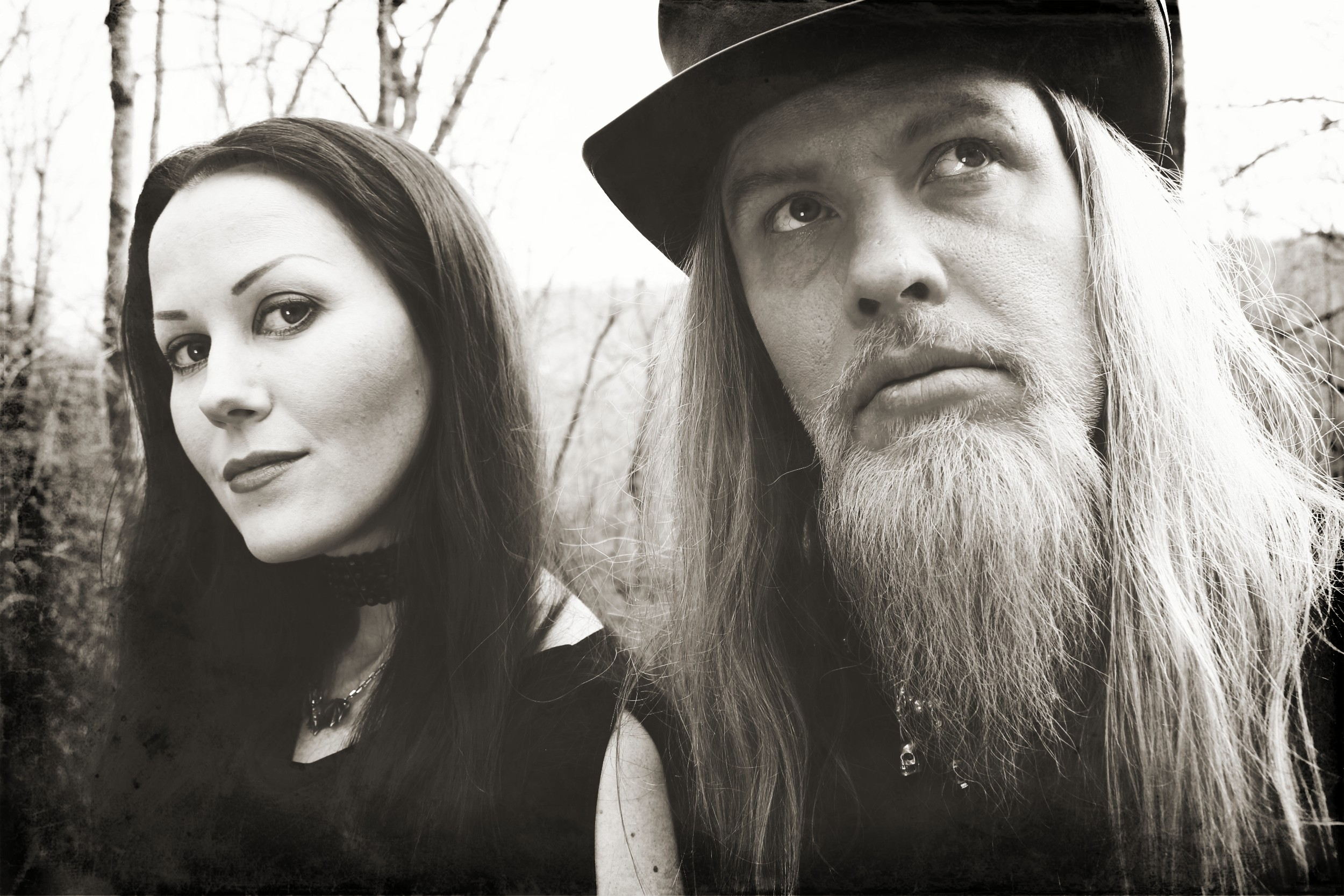

Background information
- Origin: Transylvania County, North Carolina, U.S.
- Genres: Gothic-doom; stoner rock; occult rock
- Years active: 2010–present
- Label: Napalm Records
- Website: www.bloodyhammers.com

Bloody Hammers is an American heavy metal band, founded in 2010 by Anders Manga in Transylvania County, North Carolina, United States. Manga is the primary producer, singer, songwriter, and instrumentalist. Known for combining heavy riff-driven Gothic-doom with horror-themed lyrics, the band’s core lineup consists of Manga and his wife, keyboardist Devallia. Since its inception, the band has released seven studio albums and developed a dedicated international cult following, particularly within the heavy metal and horror music communities.

== History ==
Bloody Hammers began as a solo recording project in 2010, with Anders Manga composing and producing music in his home studio. The project's name was inspired by the Roky Erickson song “Bloody Hammer.” Manga initially uploaded his recordings to Bandcamp without intentions for wide release, but the project quickly attracted attention. SoulSeller Records offered a vinyl release shortly after the songs were uploaded online.

Following this early momentum, Manga recruited his wife Devallia to contribute keyboards and help form a live band. The duo released their self-titled debut album in 2012 and established the band particularly in the Occult Rock revival of the early 2010s.

In 2014, the band signed with Napalm Records and released their third album, Under Satan’s Sun, which expanded their reach with European touring and festival appearances, including the UK's Download Festival. Subsequent albums such as Lovely Sort of Death (2016), The Summoning (2019), Songs of Unspeakable Terror (2021), and Washed in the Blood (2022) demonstrated continued evolution in their style, ranging from darkwave influences to horror-punk detours.

Throughout its history, Bloody Hammers has remained a duo in the studio, occasionally joined by additional musicians for live performances. Manga and Devallia also handle much of the band’s visual and promotional work, including DIY props and set designs rooted in vintage horror aesthetics.

== Reception and Influence ==
Bloody Hammers has received positive reviews from critics and has cultivated a strong underground following. Their ability to blend gothic and doom aesthetics appeals to a broad range of listeners, including fans of metal, goth, and horror culture. The band is often included in discussions about the 2010s occult rock revival alongside bands like Ghost and Uncle Acid & the Deadbeats.

Their contributions have helped maintain horror rock’s relevance within heavier music scenes.

== Members ==
Current members

- Anders Manga – lead vocals, guitar, bass (2010–present)
- Devallia – organ, piano (2010–present)

== Discography ==
=== Studio albums ===
- Bloody Hammers (2012)
- Spiritual Relics (2013)
- Under Satan's Sun (2014)
- Lovely Sort of Death (2016)
- The Summoning (2019)
- Songs of Unspeakable Terror (2021)
- Washed in the Blood (2022)
- The Acoustic Halloween Special (2025)

=== EP ===
- The Horrific Case of Bloody Hammers (2017) (Napalm Records)

=== Music videos ===
- "Fear No Evil" (2012)
- "What's Haunting You" (2013)
- "The Town That Dreaded Sundown" (2014)
- "Welcome to the Horror Show" (2014)
- "Death Does Us Part" (2014)
- "Necromancer" (2014)
- "The Reaper Comes" (2016)
- "Lights Come Alive" (2016)
- "Ether" (2016)
- "Now the Screaming Starts" (2019)
- "Let Sleeping Corpses Lie" (2019)
- "From Beyond the Grave" (2019)
- "A Night to Dismember" (2020)
- "Hands of the Ripper" (2021)
- "Not of this Earth" (2021)
