= Pagan Altar =

British heavy metal band

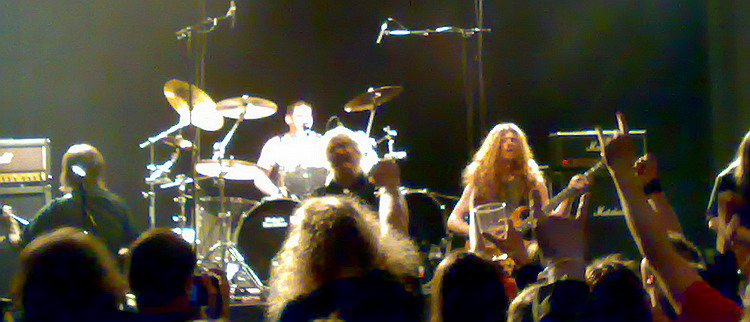
- Pagan Altar at Metal Merchants Festival in Oslo, 2009

Background information
- Origin: Brockley, London, England
- Genres: Heavy metal, doom metal, occult rock
- Years active: 1978–1985, 2004–present
- Members: Alan Jones; Andy Green; Diccon Harper
- Past members: Terry Jones; Trevor Portch; Mark Elliott; John Mizrahi; Glenn Robinson; Les Moody; Pete Dobbins; Ian Winters; Marcus Cella; Rich Walker; Luke Hunter; Vinny Konrad; Manny Cooke; Dean Alexander; William "WillyG" Gallagher
- Website: paganaltar.com

Pagan Altar is an English heavy metal and doom metal band. It was formed by Terry Jones and his son Alan in 1978 in the borough of Brockley in London and was part of the new wave of British heavy metal (NWOBHM).

== History ==
Pagan Altar's only release from the NWOBHM era was an independent, self-released, self-titled demo album (which was heavily bootlegged in later years). The album would be re-released as an official full-length on Oracle Records in 1998, retitled "Volume 1".

The group reformed in 2004 to re-record an album of previously unreleased material which had been written during their original tenure as a band. The resulting album, "Lords of Hypocrisy", met with a positive reception from fans, and a third full-length album duly followed in 2006, entitled "Mythical and Magical".

In 2008, Pagan Altar co-headlined the "Metal Brew" Festival in Mill Hill, alongside Cloven Hoof. Both bands also performed at the "British Steel IV" Festival at the Camden Underworld in 2009. Pagan Altar returned to headline the "British Steel V" Festival in April 2011 and the "Live Evil" Festival in October 2011.

In 2012, Pagan Altar began work on their next album "Never Quite Dead", in a purpose-built recording studio in the back garden of vocalist Terry Jones's home. The 2013 lineup included: Dean Alexander on drums, Vinny Konrad on 2nd guitar, and William Gallagher on bass guitar.

On 15 May 2015, vocalist Terry Jones died of cancer. The band had finished recording their upcoming album, which was in its final mastering stage. In 2017, Alan Jones announced that he intends to partially re-record the band's upcoming album as neither he nor the late Terry Jones were happy with the finished product.

In 2021, they released a compilation album of rehearsals from their earlier years titled The Story of Pagan Altar.

'Never Quite Dead' was finally released on 25 April 2025. This was their first album with new singer, Brendan Radigan, who had been touring with the band for some time after Terry Jones passed.

== Musical style ==
Alongside Witchfinder General, Pagan Altar is one of the few new wave of British heavy metal (NWOBHM) bands to play doom metal. The band's concerts are characterised by moody, epic and heavy music, blended with stage effects which accentuate their interest in occult themes.

== Discography ==
=== Albums ===
- Judgement of the Dead (1982)
- Lords of Hypocrisy (2004)
- Mythical and Magical (2006)
- Room of Shadows (2017)
- The Story of Pagan Altar (2021)
- Never Quite Dead (2025)

=== EP ===
- The Time Lord (2004, re-released as a special edition in 2012)

=== Singles ===
- Pagan Altar – "Walking in the Dark" / Jex Thoth – "Stone Evil" (Split single, 2007)
- Pagan Altar – "Portrait of Dorian Gray" / "Mirror of Deception" – "Beltaine's Joy" (Imperial Anthems split single, 2011)
- "Walking in the Dark" / "Narcissus" (2013)

=== Demo ===
- Pagan Altar (1982)

== See also ==
- List of new wave of British heavy metal bands
