= Black Widow (band) =

British rock band

- Origin: Leicester, England
- Genres: Progressive rock; hard rock; occult rock
- Years active: 1966–1973, 2007–2014
- Labels: CBS, Mystic, Black Widow
- Past members: Clive Jones; Gerry Taylor; Kip Trevor; Bob Bond; Clive Box; Kay Garrett; Chris Dredge; Jim Gannon; Romeo Challenger; Geoff Griffith; John Culley; Rick "E"
- Website: blackwidowrockband.co.uk

Black Widow were an English rock band that formed in Leicester in September 1969. They were mostly known for their early use of Satanic and occult imagery in their music and stage act.

== History ==
The band originally formed in 1966 as Pesky Gee! with Kay Garrett (lead vocals), Kip Trevor (lead vocals, guitar and harmonica), Chris Dredge (guitar), Bob Bond (bass guitar), Clive Box (drums and piano), Gerry "Zoot" Taylor (organ), Clive Jones (aka Clive Beer-Jones; saxophone and flute). Jim Gannon (guitar, vocals and vibes), replaced Dredge in spring 1969.

The band released one album for Pye Records as Pesky Gee!, 1969's Exclamation Mark, before Garrett left the band. The remaining band members continued on as Black Widow and released their debut album Sacrifice in 1970.

Sacrifice reached No. 32 on the UK Albums Chart. The band performed at the Whitsun Festival at Plumpton, UK, and at The Isle of Wight Festival in 1970.

By 1971, the band had moved away from its darker occult imagery in an effort to gain a wider audience, which was unsuccessful. Having replaced Bond and Box with Geoff Griffith and Romeo Challenger, Black Widow released the self-titled Black Widow album in 1971 and Black Widow III in 1972 (by which time Gannon had left, replaced by John Culley) to general lack of interest, before being dropped by CBS Records. The band recorded an album, Black Widow IV, later in 1972 without a recording contract. It was not released then due to the band breaking up, shortly after replacing lead vocalist Kip Trevor, with another singer known as Rick "E" (born Frank Karuba; formerly of 'Plum Nelly').

The album was finally released in 1997 on the Mystic Records label. In 1998 the original recordings of their debut album, made before Garrett left the band, were released as Return to the Sabbat. In 2000, Black Widow Records (an Italian label) released King of the Witches: Black Widow Tribute featuring bands such as Death SS and Church of Misery, as well as tracks featuring original members Kip Trevor and Clive Jones. In 2003, Sanctuary Records released an Anthology on double CD.

In 2007, Mystic Records released a concert film Demons of the Night Gather To See Black Widow – Live as a DVD. The film includes Black Widow's entire Sacrifice album show from 1970. Jones and Geoff Griffith started to work on new Black Widow music.

Paolo "Apollo" Negri from an Italian hard rock band Wicked Minds agreed to join the project on keyboards. The next Black Widow studio album, Sleeping With Demons, had a 1980s new wave style. Rock singer Tony Martin is featured on the album as a guest vocalist on the song "Hail Satan".

Black Widow's most popular song "Come to the Sabbat" has been covered by many bands and artists including Timberjack (Top 10 hit in New Zealand in 1971), Jon the Postman, Bewitched, Death SS, Propagandhi, & Flummox. Jones of Black Widow together with Mark Pollard and Kevin Brooks wrote an ABBA tribute song "Hey You Ring Me Tonight", recorded by the Swedish band The Airwaves and released in 2008 on their 3 track CD with the same name (Riverside Records Bonnier Amigo Distribution). In 2012, guitar player John Culley appeared on a cover version of the Black Widow song "You're So Wrong" on Corvus Stone's debut album.

== Personnel ==
- Clive Jones (aka Clive Beer-Jones; born Clive Alan Jones, 28 May 1949, Leicester, Leicestershire – 16 October 2014, Warwick) – saxophone, flute (1966–1973; 2007–14; his death), keyboards, lead vocals (2007–14; his death)
- Gerry "Zoot" Taylor (born 10 November 1948, Leicester, Leicestershire) – organ (1966–1973)
- Kip Trevor (born Christopher J Trevor, 12 November 1946, Littlemore, Oxfordshire) – lead vocals, guitar, harmonica (1966–1972)
- Bob Bond (born Robert Bond, 2 October 1940, Brighton, Sussex) – bass guitar (1966–1971)
- Clive Box (born 1946, Leicester, Leicestershire – October 2016) – drums, piano (1966–1971)
- Kay Garrett (born 5 April 1949, Leicester, Leicestershire) – lead vocals (1966–1969)
- Chris Dredge (born Christopher Dredge, 31 October 1946, Tipton, Staffordshire) – lead guitar (1966–1969)
- Jim Gannon (born James Gannon, 4 March 1948, Leicester, Leicestershire) – guitar (1969–1972)
- Romeo Challenger (born Romeo Alexander Challenger, 18 May 1950, St. John's, Antigua, West Indies) – drums (1971–1973)
- Geoff Griffith (born Geoffrey Griffith, 4 April 1948, Leicester, Leicestershire – 16 April 2016, Phuket) – bass guitar (1971–73; 2007–14). guitars, vocals (2007–14)
- John Culley (born 1946, Leeds, West Yorkshire) – guitar (1972–1973)
- Rick "E" (born Frank Karupa) – lead vocals (1972–1973)

== Discography ==
=== Albums ===
- Exclamation Mark (1969) as Pesky Gee! (Pye Records)
- Sacrifice (1970 CBS Records)
- Black Widow (1971 CBS Records)
- Black Widow III (1972 CBS Records)
- Black Widow IV (1997 Mystic Records), recorded in 1972
- Return to the Sabbat (1998 Mystic Records)
- Demons of the Night Gather to See Black Widow – Live (2008 Mystic Records)
- Sleeping with Demons (2011 Smack Management)
- See's the Light of Day (2012 Black Widow Records), live and studio performances recorded in 1971
- Fill Your Head with Rock (1970 CBS), Various 'sampler' album featuring Come to the Sabbat

=== Singles ===
- "Come to the Sabbat" b/w "Way to Power" (1970 CBS Records)
- "I Wish You Would" b/w "Accident" (1971 CBS Records)

=== Compilation ===
- Come to the Sabbat – Anthology (2003 Sanctuary Records)
