= Abra Kadavar =

Studio album by Kadavar
- Released: 12 April 2013
- Recorded: Berlin, Germany
- Genre: Hard rock, psychedelic rock, stoner rock
- Length: 41:17
- Label: Nuclear Blast

Kadavar chronology
Kadavar (2012)	Abra Kadavar (2013)	Live In Antwerp (2014)

Abra Kadavar is the second studio album by German rock band Kadavar, released on 12 April 2013 by Nuclear Blast. The last album to feature bassist Philipp Lippitz and the first to feature bassist Simon Boutsloup who played on the last two tracks.

The album consists of nine songs, all composed by Kadavar, plus an additional bonus track, "The Man I Shot".

== Reception ==
Professional ratings
Review scores
Source	Rating
Blabbermouth.net	8/10 stars
Rate Your Music	3.5/5 stars

Eduardo Rivadavia's Blabbermouth review was predominantly positive, comparing Kadavar to fellow hard rock band Wolfmother. The review said that the album "shows a lot of heart, body and soul – all qualities that may help put all previously held suspicions to rest", and hailed "Come Back Life" and "The Man I Shot" as the best songs. In comparison to their debut album Kadavar, Rivadavia noted that the band had made "qualitative improvement on the songwriting and production."

== Track listing ==
All songs written and composed by Christoph Lindemann, Christoph Bartelt and Philipp Lippitz.

No.	Title	Length
1.	"Come Back Life"	5:02
2.	"Doomsday Machine"	4:47
3.	"Eye of the Storm"	6:04
4.	"Black Snake"	4:24
5.	"Dust"	4:12
6.	"Fire"	5:18
7.	"Liquid Dream"	4:12
8.	"Rhythm for Endless Minds"	4:16
9.	"Abra Kadabra"	3:02

Bonus Track

No.	Title	Length
10.	"The Man I Shot"	7:04

== Personnel ==
Kadavar

- Christoph Lindemann – vocals, electric guitar, synth
- Philipp Lippitz – bass (tracks: 1–7)
- Christoph Bartelt – drums, percussion, organ, backing vocals, production, engineering, mixing, mastering
- Simon Bouteloup – bass (tracks: 8–10)

Additional personnel

- Upneet Neetu Bains – photography
- Joe Dilworth – photography
- Nathini Erber – photography
