= Doris Norton =

- Origin: Italy
- Genres: electronic, progressive rock
- Years active: 1969-present
- Labels: Durium Records, Polydor, Dig-It, Black Widow, Warner Records

Doris Norton is an Italian pioneer of electronic and computer music. She was the first musical endorser for Apple computers. Her first album, Under Ground, had an Apple logo on the front. Later, Norton released two albums with IBM Computer Music, Automatic Feeling and The Double Side of Science. She was also involved with the Italian progressive rock band Jacula. She is married to fellow Jacula member Antonio Bartoccetti.

== Discography ==
- Under Ground (1980)
- Parapsycho (1981)
- Raptus (1981)
- Nortoncomputerforpeace (1983)
- Personal Computer (1984)
- Artificial Intelligence (1985)
- Automatic Feeling (1986)
- The Double Side Of The Science (1990)
- Technoshock One (1992)
- Technoshock Two (1992)
- Technoshock Three (1993)
- Next Objective One (1993)
- Next Objective Two (1994)
- Next Objective Three (1995)
