= Jacula =

Italian rock band

- Origin: Milan, Italy
- Genres: Occult rock; gothic rock; progressive rock
- Years active: late 1960s-2017
- Labels: Gnome; Black Widow
- Spinoffs: Antonius Rex
- Members: Antonio Bartoccetti; Rexanthony; Florian Gorman; Monika Tasnad
- Past members: Franz Porthenzy; Doris Norton; Charles Tiring
- Website: www.antoniusrex.com

Jacula was an Italian rock band founded in the late 1960s in Milan as an experiment by Antonio Bartoccetti, Doris Norton, organist Charles Tiring and medium Franz Porthenzy.

Jacula's music was considered innovative for the time in progressive circles but considered dark and strange by most fans and analysts of the genre, especially in an era that included the development of groups such as Pink Floyd, Genesis and Gentle Giant, bands which were the basis of the then new progressive rock scene.

Because the band was experimental, and had been labeled by founder Antonio Bartoccetti as a youth mistake, Jacula's discography is relatively small.

The group completed three albums, Tardo Pede In Magiam Versus in 1972, Pre Viam in May, 2011 and In Cauda Semper Stat Venenum, which release date is still debated.

Tardo Pede In Magiam Versus featured Fiamma Dello Spirito's vocals, with a sound influenced by bands of the Italian underground scene such as Le Orme. In the 1970s, Jacula changed their name to Antonius Rex, maintaining the same lineup, until the release of Pre Viam.

== Discography ==
- Tardo Pede In Magiam Versus (1972)
- Pre Viam (2011)
- In Cauda Semper Stat Venenum (unknown date; either 1969 or 2001)
