= Berlin (Kadavar album) =

Studio album by Kadavar
- Released: 21 August 2015
- Recorded: Berlin, Germany
- Genre: Hard rock, psychedelic rock, stoner rock
- Label: Nuclear Blast

Kadavar chronology
Live In Antwerp (2014)	Berlin (2015)	Rough Times (2017)

Berlin is the third studio album by German rock band Kadavar, which was released on 21 August 2015, by Nuclear Blast. Notably, it was the first album to fully feature new bassist Simon Bouteloup. It featured a cover of Nico's "Reich der Träume" as a bonus track.

== Background ==
After working for four months in the studio, the band finalized the production process of the new album on 1 June 2015, according to their Facebook page.

Drummer and producer Christoph "Tiger" Bartelt commented: "About 10 years ago, when we – independently of one another – moved to Berlin, we just wanted to break free from home and do something new. I thought it was comfortable to blend in and just live from day to day. There were a lot of very long nights and so many completely different people at one place. Where there are opposites, you can always ground yourself. We're all different, coming from different places, but have managed to create something together we all like. I think the Berlin lifestyle has influenced our band very much and therefore fits perfectly as the album's title."

The 11th and final track on the album, "Into the Night," was chosen by pro skateboarder Riley Hawk for his Scion AV compilation album, Riley Hawk: Northwest Blow Out EP.

== Track listing ==
No.	Title	Length
1.	"Lord of the Sky"	4:28
2.	"Last Living Dinosaur"	4:05
3.	"Thousand Miles Away From Home"	4:53
4.	"Filthy Illusion"	3:45
5.	"Pale Blue Eyes"	3:28
6.	"Stolen Dreams"	3:57
7.	"The Old Man"	4:05
8.	"Spanish Wild Rose"	4:30
9.	"See the World With Your Own Eyes"	4:07
10.	"Circles in My Mind"	3:47
11.	"Into the Night"	4:30

Bonus Track

No.	Title	Length
12.	"Reich der Träume" (Nico cover)	6:39

== Personnel ==
Kadavar

- Christoph Lindemann – vocals, electric guitar
- Simon Bouteloup – bass
- Christoph Bartelt – drums, percussion, production, engineering, mixing

Additional personnel

- Elizaveta Porodina – photography, modeling
- Pelle Gunnerfeldt – mixing
- Robin Schmidt – mastering

== Charts ==
Chart (2015)	Peak position
Austrian Albums (Ö3 Austria)	56
Belgian Albums (Ultratop Flanders)	139
Belgian Albums (Ultratop Wallonia)	40
French Albums (SNEP)	146
German Albums (Offizielle Top 100)	18
Swiss Albums (Schweizer Hitparade)	88
