= Kadavar (album) =

Studio album by Kadavar
- Released: 10 July 2012
- Recorded: Berlin, Germany
- Genre: Hard rock, psychedelic rock, stoner rock
- Length: 33:56
- Label: This Charming Man Records/Tee Pee Records

Kadavar chronology
Kadavar (2012)	Abra Kadavar (2013)

Kadavar is the debut studio album by German rock band Kadavar, released on 10 July 2012 by This Charming Man Records/Tee Pee Records. The album consists of six songs, all composed by the band, including the lengthy "Purple Sage", plus bonus track "Living in Your Head".

== Reception ==
Professional ratings
Review scores
Source	Rating
AllMusic	3.5/5 stars

Eduardo Rivadavia from AllMusic wrote a predominantly positive review of the album, describing the band as a "stubborn trio who refuse to let go of their 70s proto-metal dreams".

== Track listing ==
All songs written and composed by Kadavar.

No.	Title	Length
1.	"All Our Thoughts"	4:35
2.	"Black Sun"	6:12
3.	"Forgotten Past"	5:38
4.	"Goddess of Dawn"	4:13
5.	"Creature of the Demon"	4:48
6.	"Purple Sage"	8:06

Bonus Track

No.	Title	Length
7.	"Living in Your Head"	7:00

== Personnel ==
Kadavar

- Christoph "Lupus" Lindemann – vocals, guitar, layout
- Philipp "Mammut" Lippitz – bass
- Christoph "Tiger" Bartelt – drums, production, mixing, mastering

Additional personnel

- Shazzula – theremin on "Purple Sage"
- Joe Dilworth – front cover photography
- Florian Penke – back cover photography

== Charts ==
2024 chart performance for Kadavar
Chart (2024)	Peak position
German Albums (Offizielle Top 100)	30
