= Antonio Bartoccetti =

- Born: 18 December 1946 (age 79)
- Origin: Macerata, Italy
- Instruments: Guitar, Electric bass

Antonio Bartoccetti (Macerata, 18 December 1946) is an Italian musician and composer, and leader of the musical groups, Antonius Rex, Jacula, Dietro Noi Deserto and Invisible Force. He is married to fellow Jacula member Doris Norton.

== Biography ==
Beginning in 1968, his primary focus has been progressive rock. His bands, notably Antonius Rex, have published numerous LPs.

In recent years, four other albums have been released on CD and digital download: Magic Ritual, Switch On Dark, Per Viam, Pre Viam. As producer, Antonio Bartoccetti has also produced all albums and singles by his son Rexanthony. He is married to musical pioneer, Doris Norton.

== Discography ==
=== With Dietro Noi Deserto ===
- 1969 – Dentro me/Aiuto (45 RPM, Decca Records)

=== With Invisible Force ===
- 1971 – Morti vident/1999 mundi finis (single)

=== With Jacula ===
- 1972 – Tardo Pede in Magiam Versus (Rogers, TRS 010001; re-issued on CD on Mellow Records, MMP 136)
- 2001 – In Cauda Semper Stat Venenum (Black Widow Records, BWR 051)
- 2011 – Pre Viam (Black Widow Records, BWR 135CD)

=== With Antonius Rex ===
- 1977 – Zora (re-issued on CD in 1994 and 2010)
- 1978 – Ralefun (re-issued on CD in 1994 and 2011)
- 1979 – Anno Demoni (re-issued on CD in 2002)
- 1980 – Praeternatural (re-issued on CD in 2003)
- 2002 – Neque Semper Arcum Tendit Rex (2002)
- 2005 – Magic Ritual (2005)
- 2006 – Switch On Dark (2006)
- 2009 – Pre Viam (2009)
- 2012 – Hystero Demonopathy

== Bibliography ==
- Gino Castaldo (ed.), A Dictionary of Italian Song, Curcio, Rome, 1990; Voices of Jacula, by Roberto Ruggeri, p. 845, and Antonius Rex, by Marco Giorgi, p. 46
- Paolo Barotto, The Return of Italian Pop, Stilgraf Publishing, Luserna San Giovanni, 1989; entries re. Antonius Rex, pp. 21–22, and Jacula, pp. 64–65
