= Kadavar =

German rock band

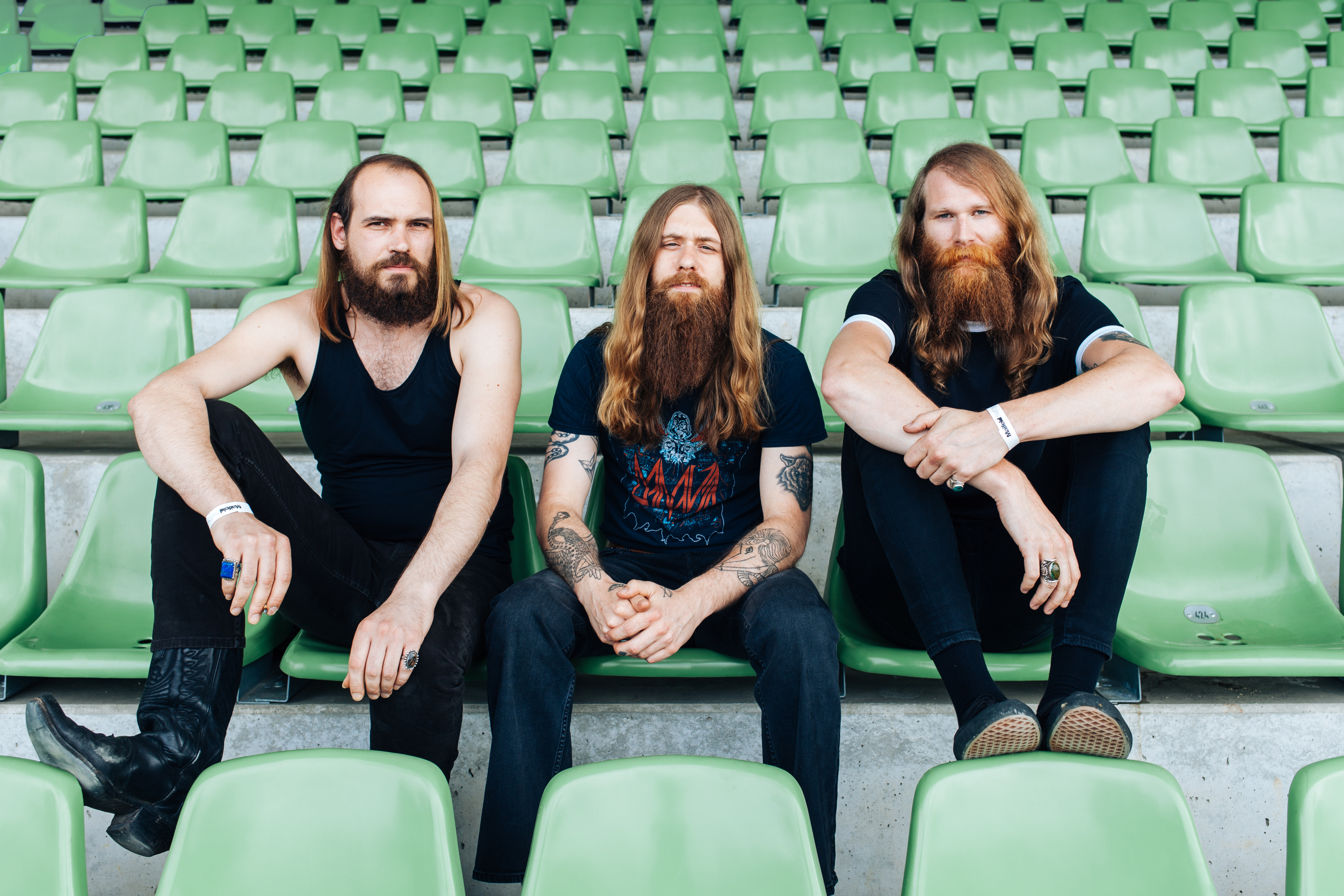
- Kadavar at Maifeld Derby, 2016. From left to right: Simon Bouteloup, Christoph Lindemann and Christoph Bartelt.

Background information
- Origin: Berlin, Germany
- Genres: Hard rock, psychedelic rock, stoner rock
- Years active: 2010–present
- Labels: Tee Pee, Nuclear Blast, Robotor
- Members: Christoph Lindemann; Christoph Bartelt; Simon Bouteloup; Jascha Kreft
- Past members: Philipp Lippitz
- Website: kadavar.com

Kadavar is a German rock band from Berlin, founded in 2010. It currently consists of guitarist/lead vocalist Christoph "Lupus" Lindemann, drummer Christoph "Tiger" Bartelt, bassist Simon "Dragon" Bouteloup, and guitarist and keyboardist Jascha Kreft. Their retro style, incorporating psychedelic rock and stoner rock, has been compared to bands of the 1970s hard rock/heavy metal era such as Led Zeppelin and Black Sabbath. Bartelt and Lindemann formed Kadavar as a trio with bassist Philipp "Mammut" Lippitz. When Lippitz left the band in July 2013, he was replaced by Bouteloup. After releasing six studio albums, Kadavar became a quartet in March 2023 with the addition of Kreft.

== History ==
In 2010, drummer Bartelt and guitarist Philipp "Mammut" Lippitz began playing together. They became a band when Lindemann joined as bassist and vocalist. Lindemann decided to switch to guitar, allowing Lippitz to switch to bass. Their first recording, an eponymous two-song CD-R, was self-released on 25 August 2011.

On 12 July 2012, Kadavar's self-titled debut album was released on Tee Pee Records.

A collaboration with the band Aqua Nebula Oscillator resulted in the release of the White Ring album in November 2012.

Due to visa problems, a planned U.S. tour could not take place, although the band did appear at the South by Southwest festival in Austin, Texas, on 15 March 2013. While in Texas, the band recorded various video clips of themselves which were later used to create the music video for their song "Come Back Life", which was produced by Bartelt.

In July 2013, Lippitz left the band to concentrate on his new group the Loranes. He was replaced by Bouteloup, previously of metal band the Oath. After several live performances, Bouteloup was officially announced as a new member.

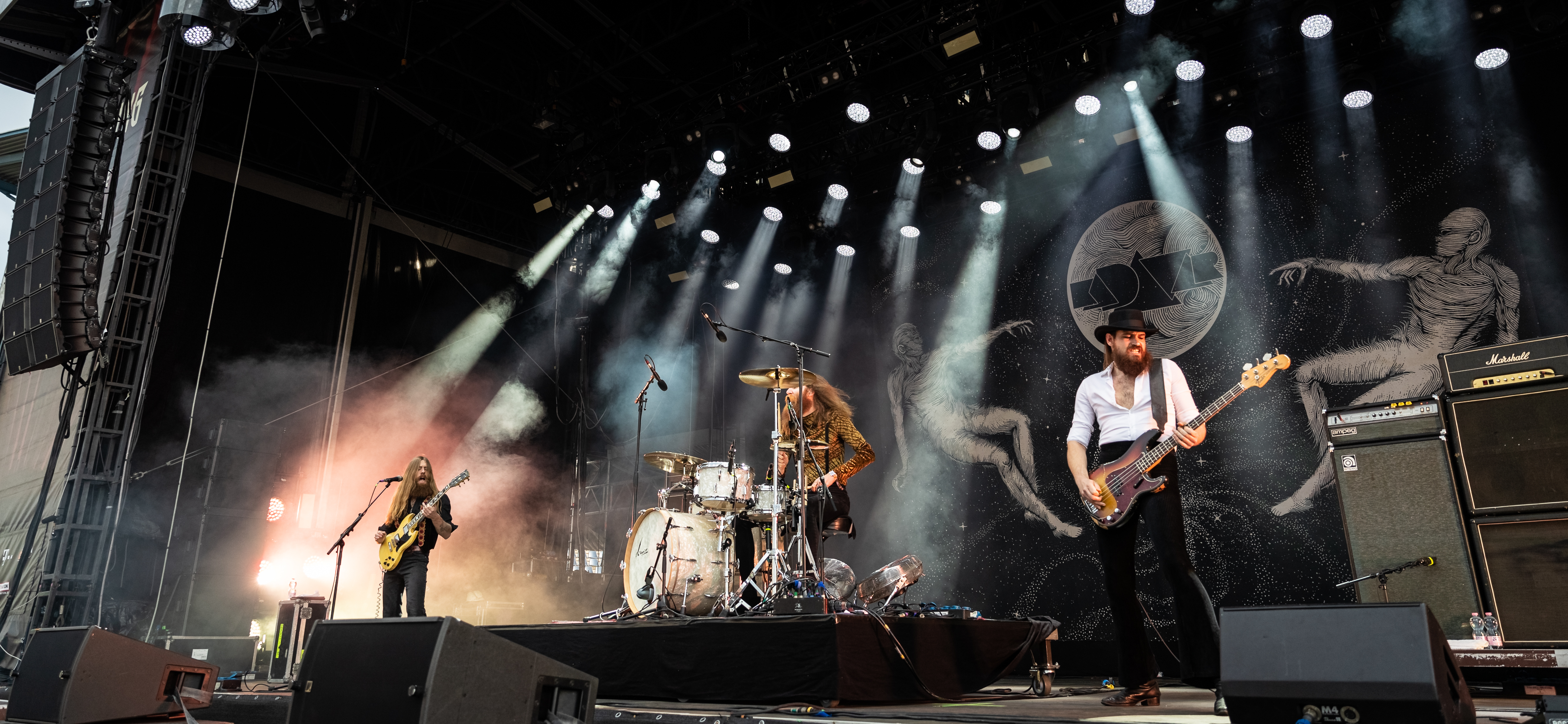
Kadavar live at Rock am Ring 2019

Their second album, Abra Kadavar, was released on 12 April 2013 by Nuclear Blast, and debuted at No. 42 on the German charts.

In early 2014, Kadavar started touring with fellow retro-style hard rock band Wolfmother. In July 2014, Wolfmother jammed and recorded a few songs in Kadavar's studio. On 6 June 2014, Kadavar released a live album, Live in Antwerp.

Kadavar's third album, Berlin, was released on 21 August 2015 by Nuclear Blast; it included a cover of Nico's "Reich der Träume" as a bonus track. The album entered the charts in several countries, hitting No. 18 in Germany and No. 40 in Belgium.

In 2015, drummer Bartelt co-wrote the song "Wedding" with Andrew Stockdale. It was released on 19 February 2016 as a bonus track on Wolfmother's fourth album, Victorious.

Kadavar's fourth album, Rough Times, was released on 29 September 2017.

Their fifth album, For the Dead Travel Fast, was released on 11 October 2019.

On their own record label, Robotor Records, Kadavar released a split vinyl single with Lucifer on 19 March 2021, to which they contributed a cover of "The Green Manalishi (With the Two Prong Crown)" by Fleetwood Mac.

In March 2023, Kadavar announced that Jascha Kreft of the Odd Couple had officially joined the band on guitar and keyboards.

== Style ==
In the studio, Kadavar uses "hard-panning" production techniques (guitar tracks on the left channel, bass on the right, drums on the inside right and vocals in the middle) to accurately reproduce the sound of their live performances. Their style has been categorized to have a "riffed psych rock and doom-like sound" with influences from Black Sabbath, The Doors, Hawkwind and Led Zeppelin.

== Band members ==
Current members

- Christoph "Lupus" Lindemann – guitars, vocals (2010–present), bass (2010)
- Christoph "Tiger" Bartelt – drums (2010–present)
- Simon "Dragon" Bouteloup – bass (2013–present)
- Jascha Kreft – guitars, keyboards (2023–present)

Former members

- Philipp "Mammut" Lippitz – bass (2010–2013), guitars (2010)
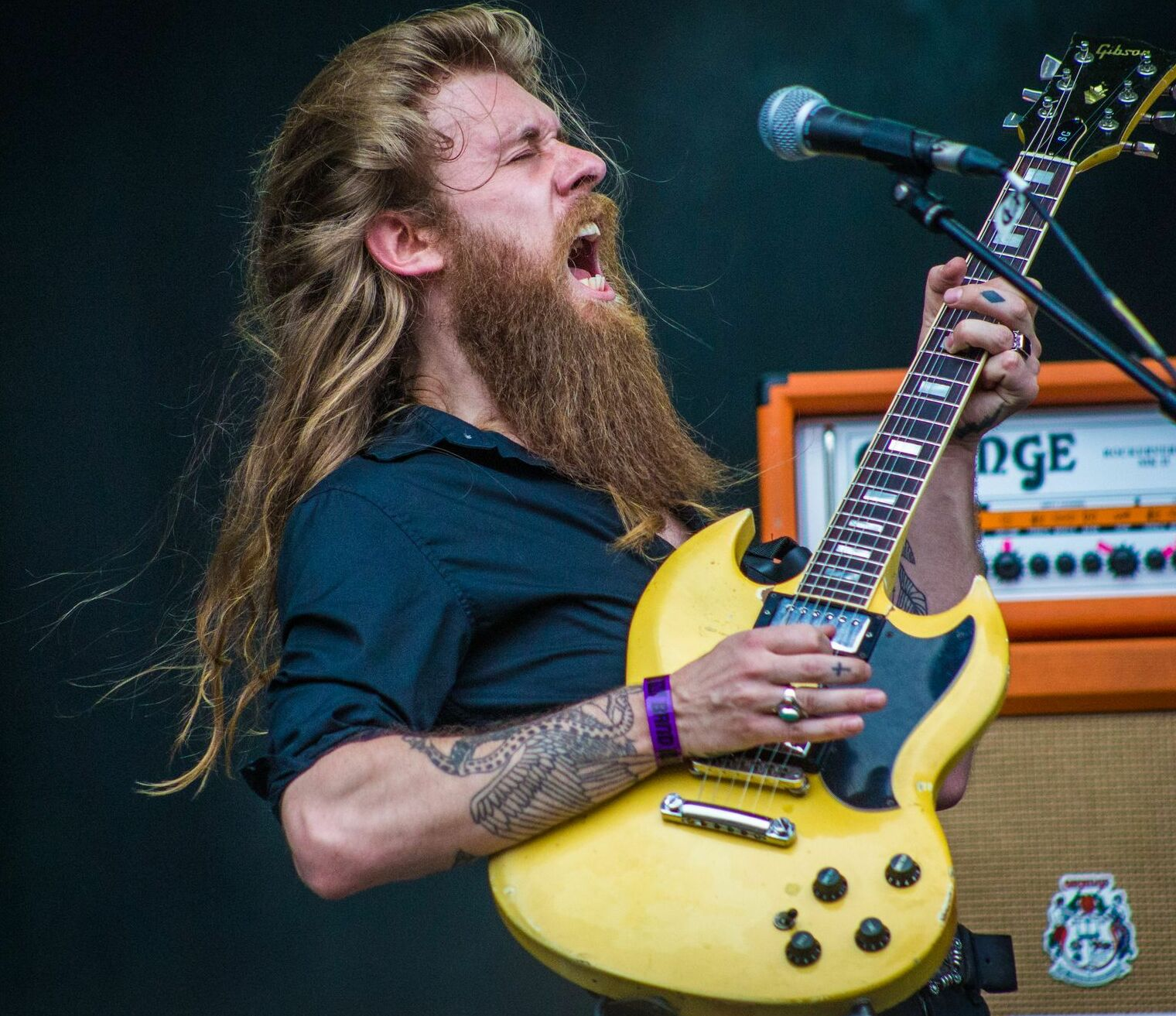
Lindemann

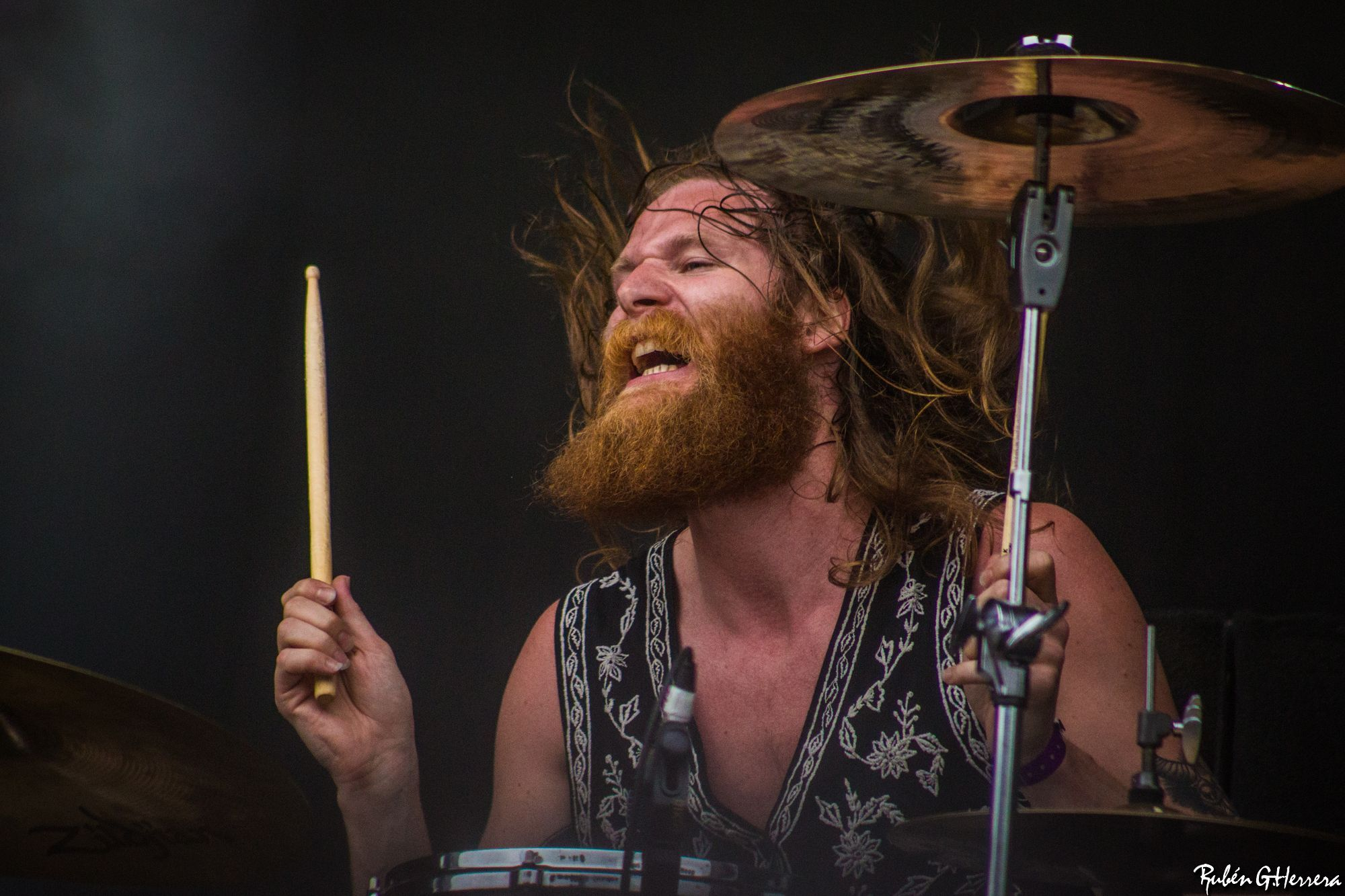
Bartelt

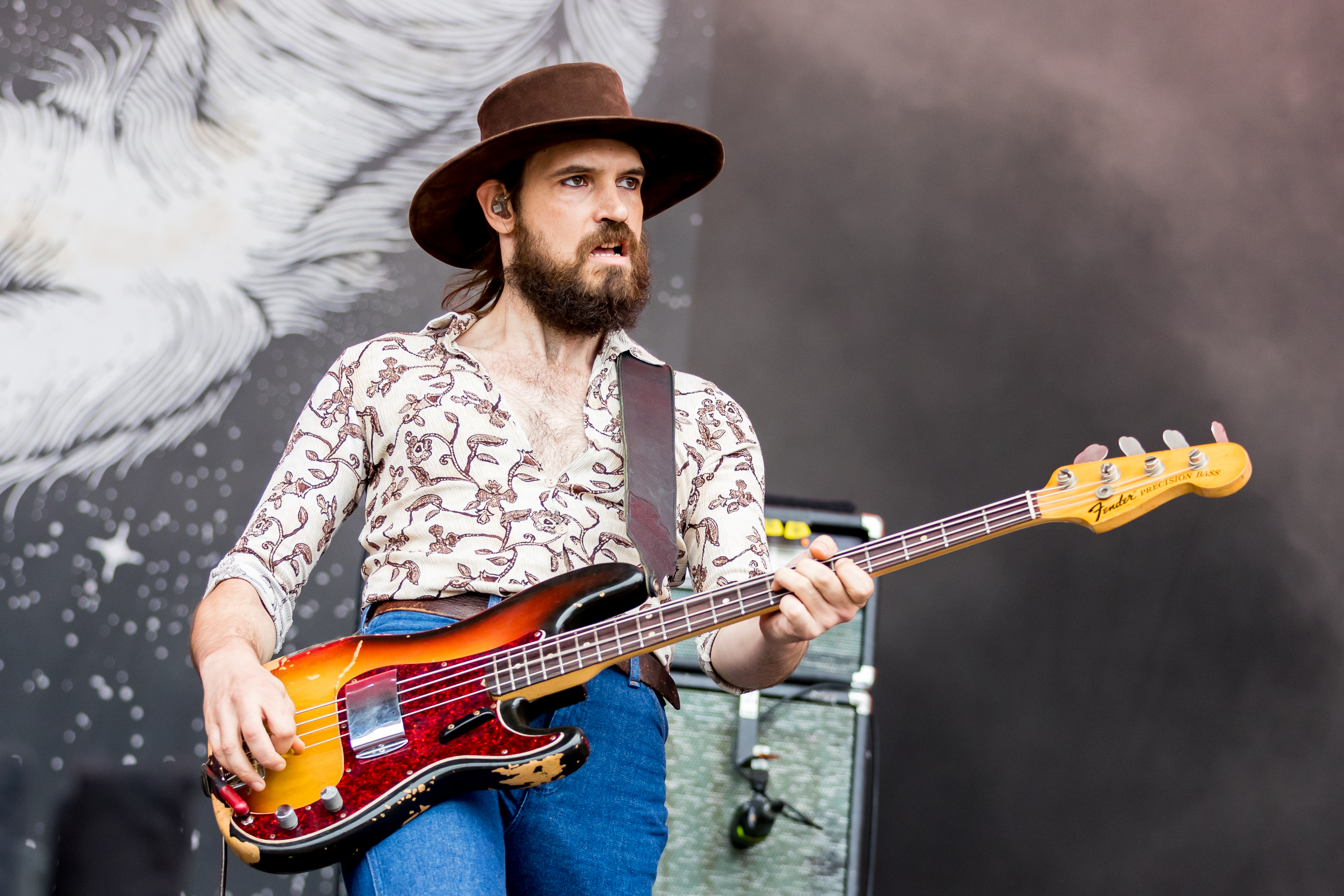
Bouteloup

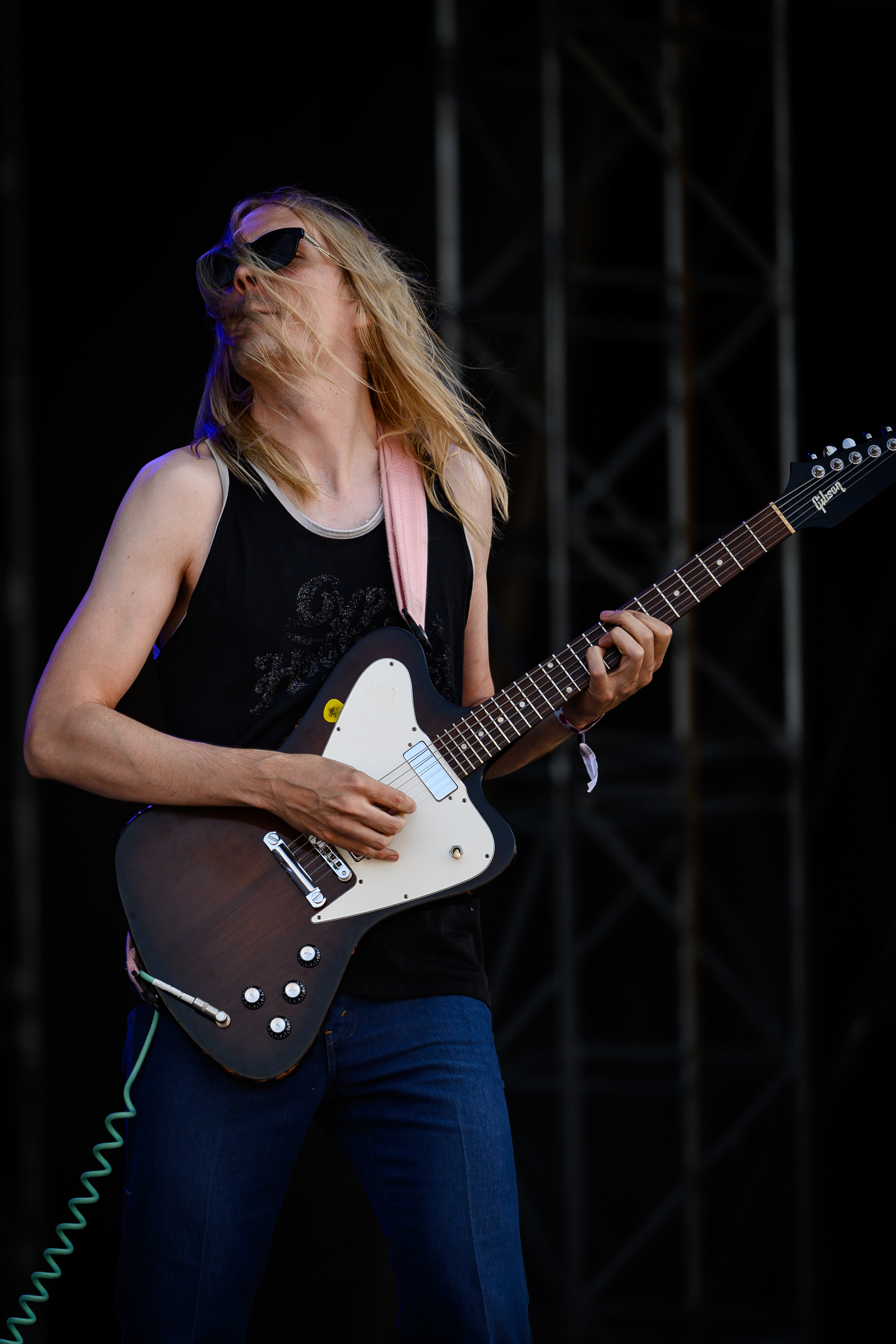
Kreft

== Discography ==
Studio albums

- Kadavar (2012, Tee Pee Records)
- White Ring (2012, with Aqua Nebula Oscillator)
- Abra Kadavar (2013, Nuclear Blast)
- Berlin (2015, Nuclear Blast)
- Rough Times (2017, Nuclear Blast)
- For the Dead Travel Fast (2019, Nuclear Blast)
- The Isolation Tapes (2020, Robotor Records)
- ELDOVAR - A Story of Darkness & Light (2021) (with Elder)
- I Just Want to Be a Sound (2025, Clouds Hill)
- Kids Abandoning Destiny Among Vanity And Ruin (2025)

Singles and EPs

- Kadavar CD single (2011, self-released)
- Creature of the Demon 7" single (2012, This Charming Man Records)
- The Old Man digital single (2015, Nuclear Blast)
- Everything Is Changing (2020, Robotor Records)

Live albums

- Live in Antwerp (2014, Nuclear Blast)
- Live in Copenhagen (2018, Nuclear Blast)

== Awards and nominations ==
=== Berlin Music Video Awards ===
The Berlin Music Video Awards is an international festival that promotes the art of music videos.

Year	Nominated work	Award	Result	Ref.
2025	"I Just Want to Be a Sound"	Best AI	Nominated	
