= Occult rock =

Style of rock music

- Other names: Doom rock; witch rock
- Stylistic origins: Proto-metal; hard rock; blues; psychedelic rock; progressive rock
- Cultural origins: Late 1960s to early 1970s, England and United States
- Typical instruments: Vocals, guitar, bass, drums
- Derivative forms: Heavy metal; stoner metal; doom metal; sludge metal

Other topics
- Shock rock; pagan rock; acid rock

Occult rock (also known as doom rock or witch rock) is a subgenre of rock music that originated in the late 1960s to early 1970s, pioneered by bands such as Coven and Black Widow.

The genre is influenced by hard rock, proto-metal, psychedelic rock, progressive rock and blues, as well as commonly incorporating lyrics referencing the occult with influences from classic horror movies to books by Dennis Wheatley. Despite the common perception, it has been noted that occult rock is not inherently gloomy nor dark, although many bands have made music with these qualities.

== Characteristics ==
The genre has been described as being influenced by hard rock, proto-metal, psychedelic rock, progressive rock, and blues, as well as commonly incorporating lyrics referencing the occult, but is not inherently or invariably gloomy or dark. AXS noted that Tony Iommi's doom rock style of riffing defined the genre of heavy metal.

== History ==
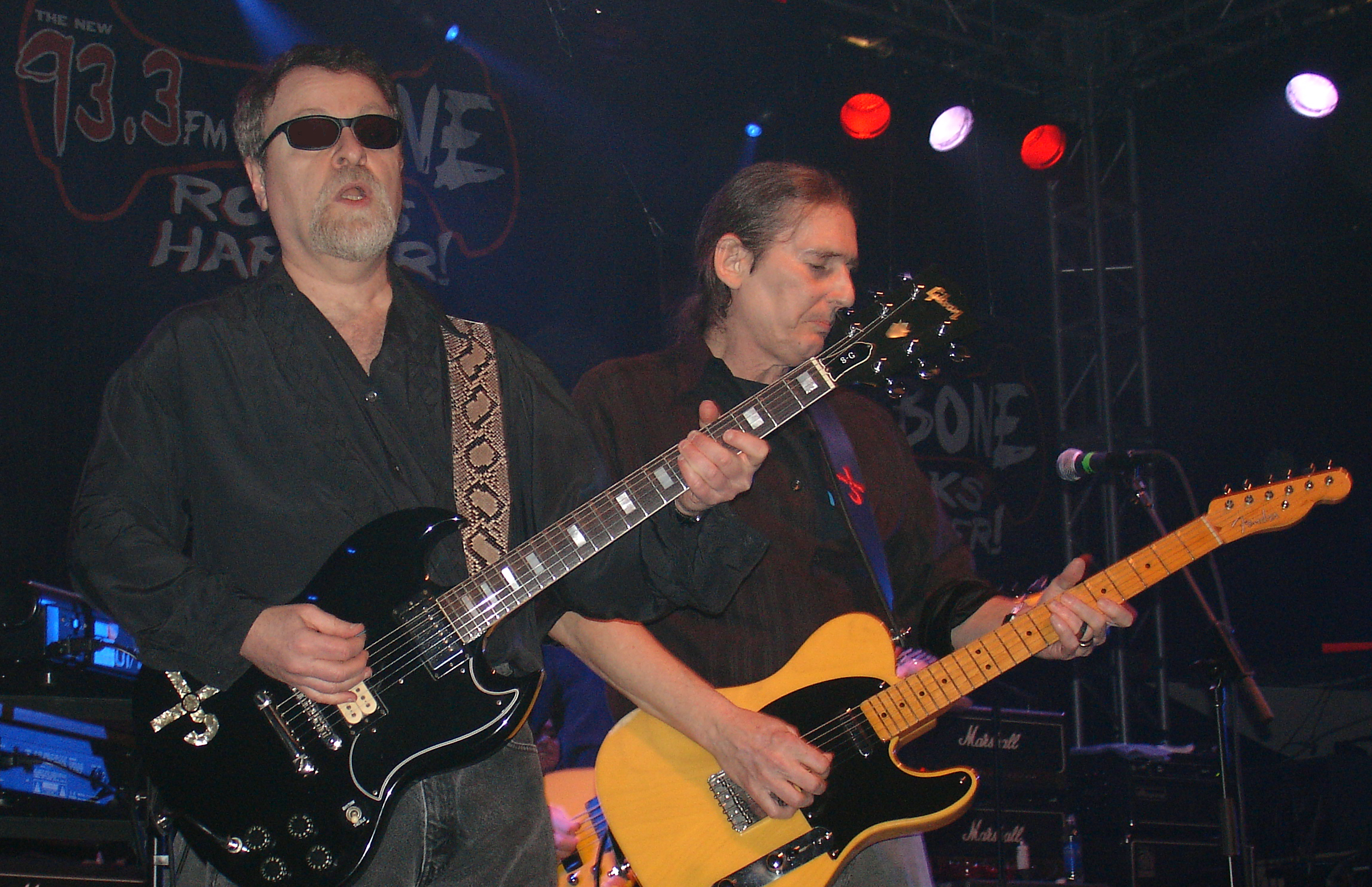
Blue Öyster Cult performing in 2006.

=== Origins (1960s-1990s) ===
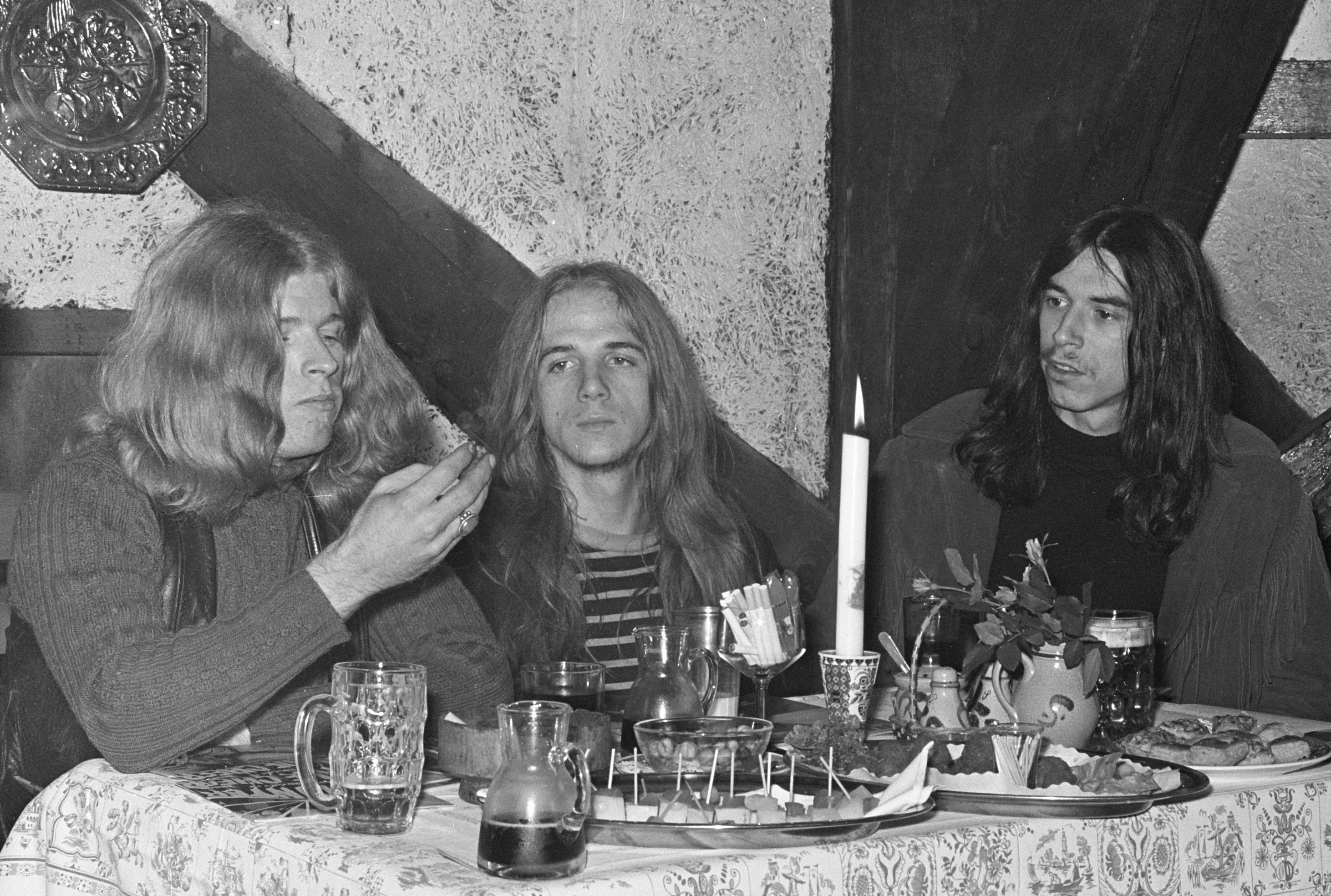
Blue Cheer in 1968.

Occult rock emerged in the 1960s with groups such as Jacula, Black Widow and, most notably, Coven. Iron Butterfly's 1968 track "In-A-Gadda-Da-Vida" was very influential to the development of occult rock's sound. Coven released their debut album Witchcraft Destroys Minds & Reaps Souls in 1969, which preceded later occult rock groups such as the debut album by Black Widow, titled Sacrifice. Blue Öyster Cult released their debut album Blue Öyster Cult in 1972, which had significant influence on later bands such as Ghost. Due to the association with the occult, around the time of the Manson Family murders, many occult rock albums were halted from distribution, which only helped increase the public's fear of the music. When Black Sabbath first released their eponymous debut album in 1970, Rolling Stone's Lester Bangs described it as "England's answer to Coven". Early occult rock bands such as Coven, Black Sabbath, Blue Cheer, Hawkwind and Blue Öyster Cult are considered by some critics to be extremely influential on the development of heavy metal music, or more specifically, styles such as stoner metal, doom metal and sludge metal. In 1976, Blue Öyster Cult released their fourth studio album Agents of Fortune; the album's first released single, "(Don't Fear) The Reaper", peaked at number 12 on the Billboard Hot 100 chart. The imagery of occult rock bands was eventually revived, with the rise of New wave of British heavy metal bands such as Venom, Satan and Hell.

=== Revival (2000s-present) ===
Beginning in the 2000s, occult rock experienced a revival, with a sound reminiscent of the style of the 1970s, including bands such as Ghost, Luciferian Light Orchestra, The Devil's Blood, Witch Mountain, Orchid and Blood Ceremony. Ghost's third and fourth albums reached numbers 8 and 3, respectively, on the Billboard 200. In 2007, occult rock bands Coven and Black Widow reformed and toured with many bands that they helped influence. Prog Magazine described the revival as encompassing a myriad of styles, including post-rock, psych-prog and progressive rock, as well as a distinct number of bands possessing female vocalists. Kadavar are considered by some critics to be one of the bands spearheading the German occult rock scene, despite them rejecting the label themselves. Kadavar's third studio album "Berlin" reached number 21 on the Billboard Heatseekers albums charts in 2015, which was five places higher than their previous effort.

== See also ==
- List of occult rock bands
- Social effects of rock music
- Witch house
- First-wave black metal
