= List of Blue Öyster Cult members =

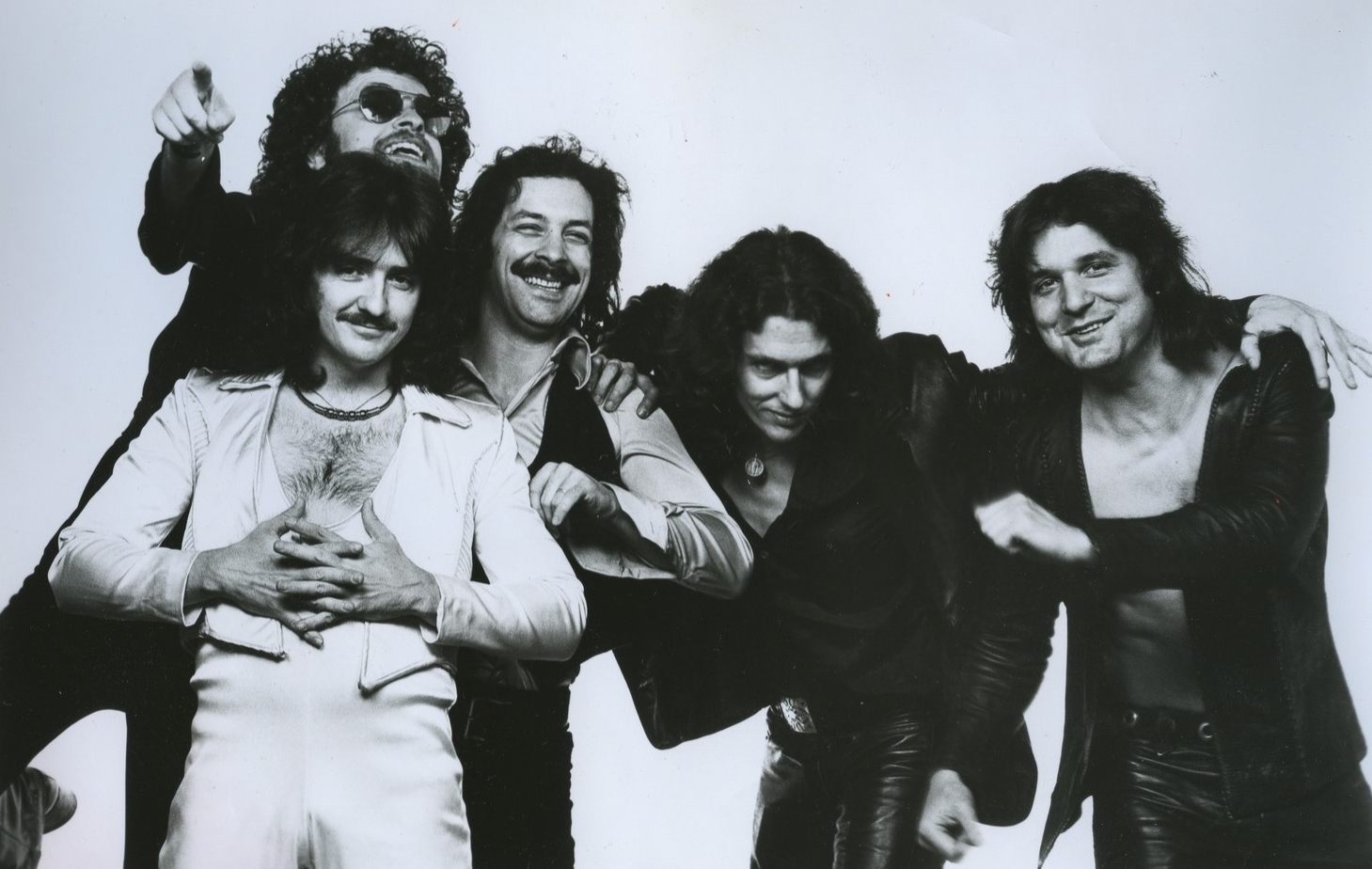
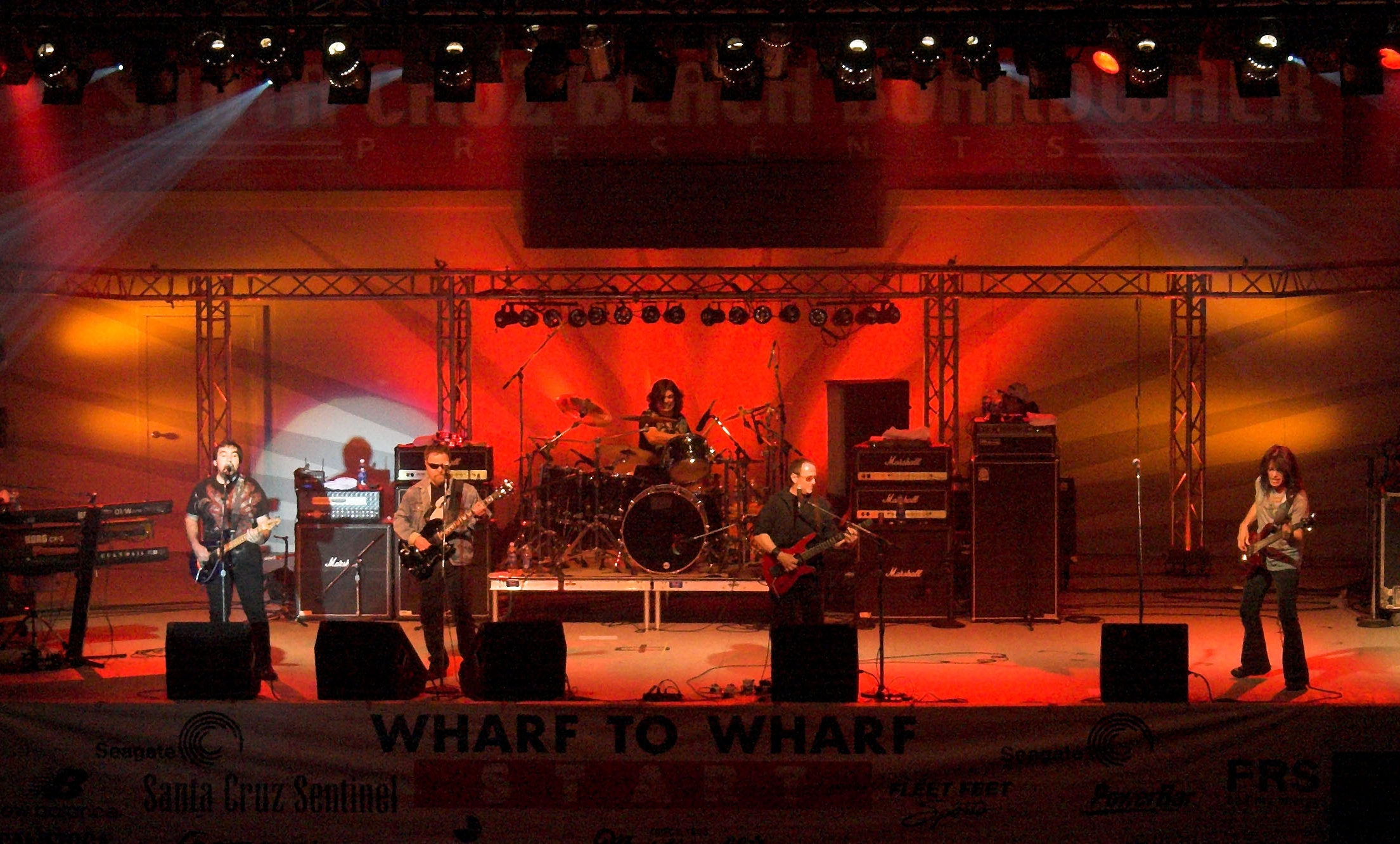
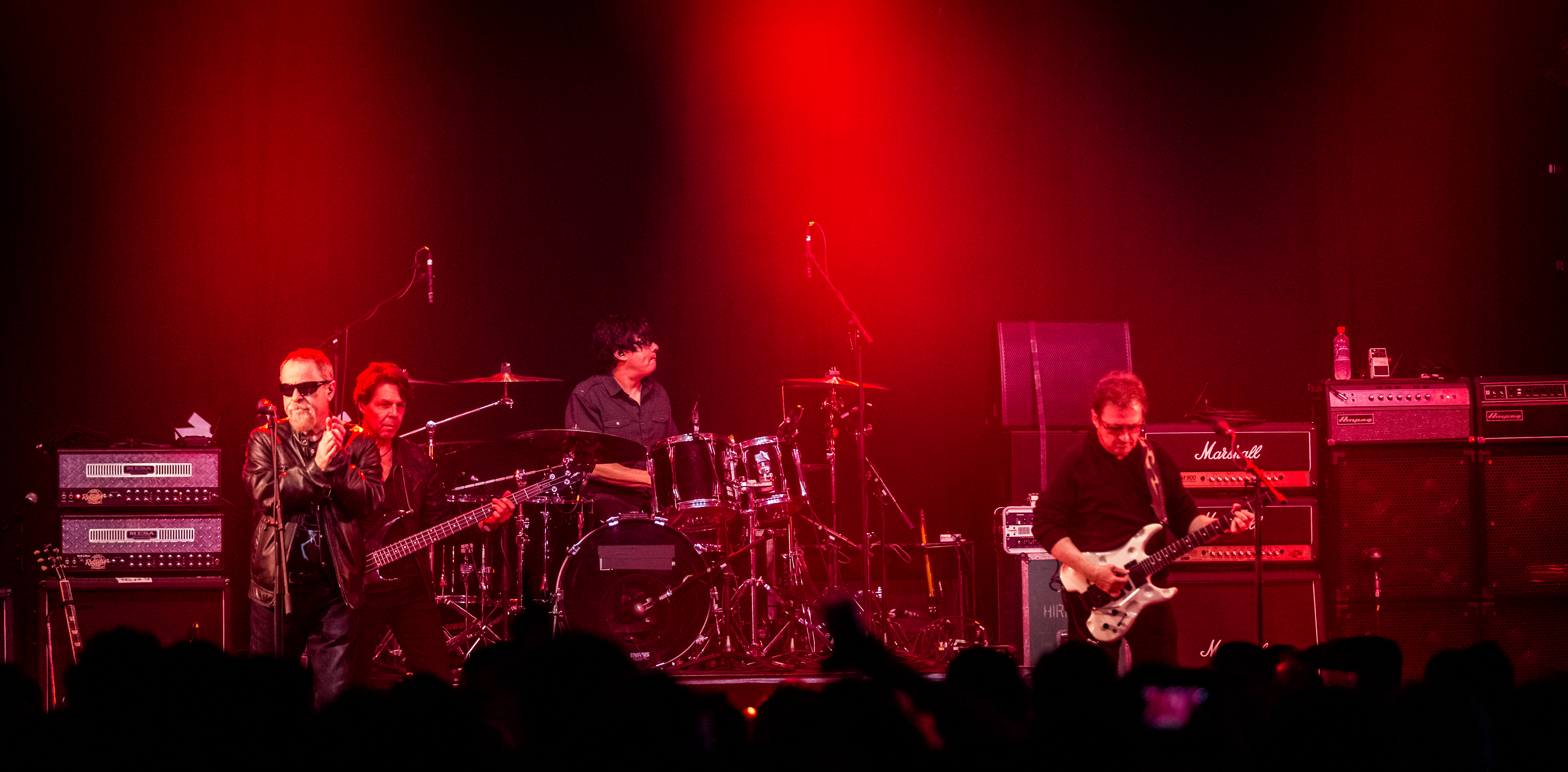
Three lineups of Blue Öyster Cult in 1977 (top), 2008 (middle) and 2016 (bottom).

Blue Öyster Cult is an American hard rock band from Long Island, New York. Formed in 1967, the group originally consisted of guitarist and vocalist Donald "Buck Dharma" Roeser, bassist Andrew Winters, drummer and vocalist Albert Bouchard, keyboardist and later also rhythm guitarist Allen Lanier, and rhythm guitarist John Wiesenthal. Since changing its name to Blue Öyster Cult in 1970, the band has been through many lineup changes, and currently includes Roeser, vocalist and rhythm guitarist Eric Bloom, bassist and backing vocalist Danny Miranda (from 1995 to 2004, in 2007, and since 2017), rhythm guitarist, keyboardist and vocalist Richie Castellano, and drummer Jules Radino (both since 2004).

== History ==
=== 1967–1986 ===
Blue Öyster Cult was formed in 1967 as Soft White Underbelly, under the guidance of manager Sandy Pearlman and writer Richard Meltzer. The original lineup of the group included guitarist and vocalist Donald "Buck Dharma" Roeser, keyboardist Allen Lanier, rhythm guitarist John Wiesenthal, bassist and backing vocalist Andrew Winters, and drummer and backing vocalist Albert Bouchard. After several short-lived line-ups, Les Braunstein was brought in later as the band's first lead vocalist. Braunstein was replaced by Eric Bloom in mid-1969, during which time the band changed name twice – first to Oaxaca and later to Stalk-Forrest Group. Winters was replaced in the summer of 1970 by Albert's brother Joe Bouchard, and the following year the group settled on the name Blue Öyster Cult.

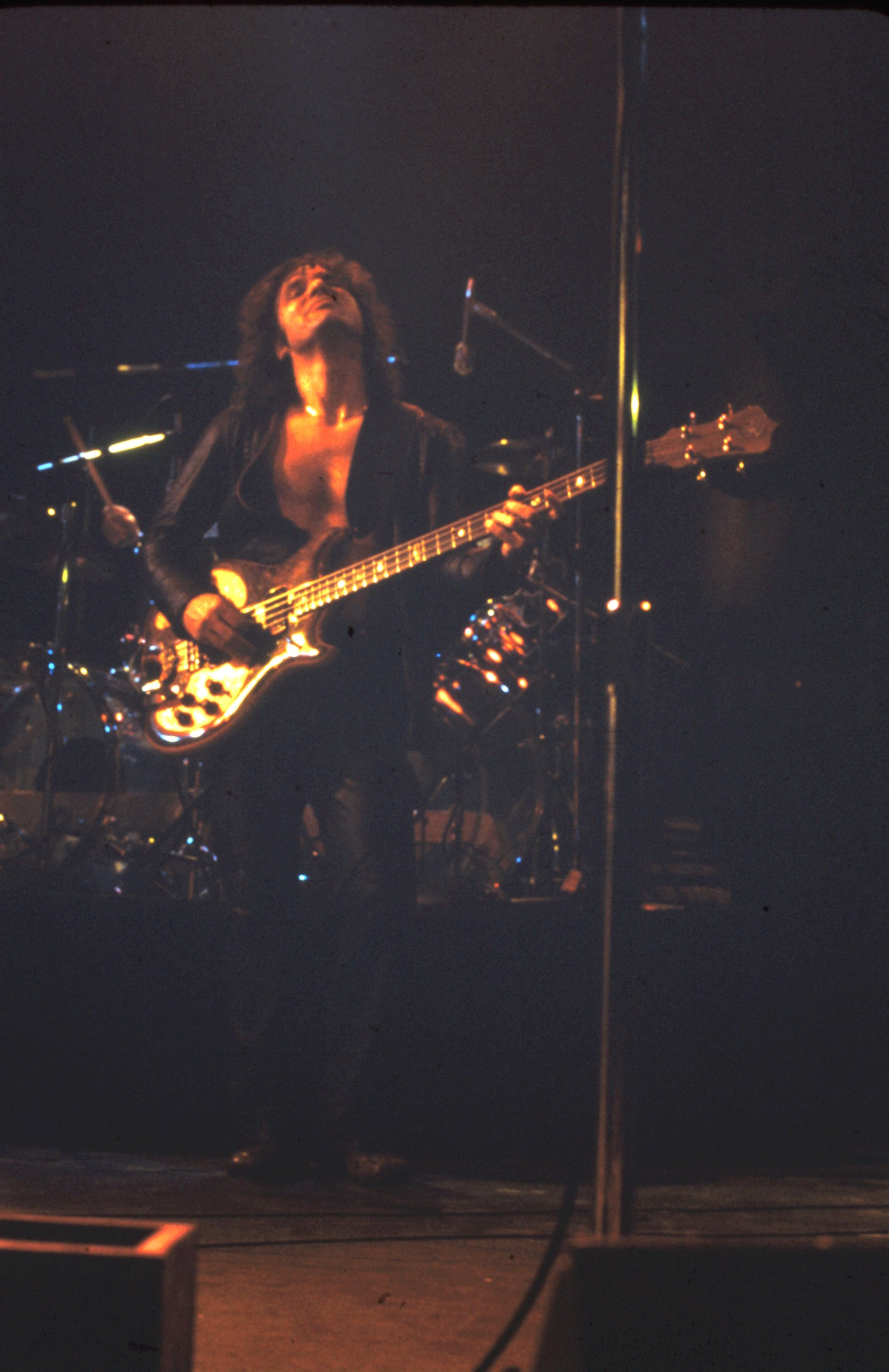
Founding member Albert Bouchard's brother Joe, joined as bassist in 1970

The lineup of Blue Öyster Cult remained stable for over ten years, during which time the band released its most commercially successful material. However, in August 1981 Albert Bouchard was fired after a show for turning up late on several recent occasions. He was replaced by Rick Downey, who had been working as the band's crew chief and lighting designer. Downey remained with the group until January 1985, after which Bouchard returned for a short run of shows in February before Jimmy Wilcox joined in April. Lanier was also replaced by Tommy Zvoncheck at around the same time. Joe Bouchard left the following year after playing his last show in February, with Jon Rogers taking his place. After touring until September, Blue Öyster Cult began a temporary hiatus which would ultimately last less than a year.

=== 1987 onwards ===
Upon receiving an offer to tour in Greece, Blue Öyster Cult reformed in 1987 with returning keyboardist Lanier and new drummer Ron Riddle. The band's next studio album, Imaginos, was originally recorded as an Albert Bouchard solo album, but was later reworked and released by the band. Riddle left in May 1991 and was replaced the following month by Chuck Burgi. John Miceli briefly substituted for Burgi in May 1992, and in September 1995 the drummer left the band to join Rainbow. Rogers also left in April, with Greg Smith taking his place until Danny Miranda took over in August. John O'Reilly joined on drums in September, but would only remain until the following August when Burgi returned. Miceli returned for a string of shows in early 1997, before Bobby Rondinelli joined in February. Guitarist Al Pitrelli toured with the band as a substitute for Lanier from February to March during the band's 1999 tour.

After contributing to three studio albums, Miranda and Rondinelli left Blue Öyster Cult in September 2004, the former joining Miceli in the band for the Las Vegas production of the We Will Rock You musical and the latter joining The Lizards full-time. Miranda was replaced by Richie Castellano, while Jules Radino took Rondinelli's place. Lanier played his last show as a member of Blue Öyster Cult in November 2006, retiring from all recording and touring shortly after. Castellano took over Lanier's role in the band, while bass was handled briefly by returning members Miranda followed by Rogers, before Rudy Sarzo joined in June. Sarzo remained until 2012, when he and the band decided to part ways. Kasim Sulton took Sarzo's place, remaining with the band until early 2017 when Miranda returned.

== Members ==
Bold indicates members of the classic lineup.

=== Current ===
Image	Name	Years active	Instruments	Release contributions
	**Buck Dharma** **(Donald Roeser)**	1967–1986; 1987–present	lead guitar; lead and backing vocals; keyboards (studio)	all releases
	**Eric Bloom**	1969–1986; 1987–present	lead and backing vocals; "stun" (rhythm) guitar; keyboards	all releases
	Danny Miranda	1995–2004; 2017–present (regular fill-in 2007–2016)	bass; backing vocals	Heaven Forbid (1998); Curse of the Hidden Mirror (2001); A Long Day's Night (2002); 45th Anniversary Live in London (2020); The Symbol Remains (2020); Ghost Stories (2024)
	Richie Castellano	2004–present	keyboards; rhythm and lead guitar; backing and lead vocals; bass (2004–2007)	Hard Rock Live Cleveland 2014 (2020); 40th Anniversary - Agents of Fortune - Live 2016 (2020); iHeart Radio Theater N.Y.C. 2012 (2020); 45th Anniversary Live in London (2020); Live at Rock of Ages Festival 2016 (2020); The Symbol Remains (2020); Ghost Stories (2024)
	Jules Radino	2004–present	drums; percussion	Hard Rock Live Cleveland 2014 (2020); 40th Anniversary - Agents of Fortune - Live 2016 (2020); iHeart Radio Theater N.Y.C. 2012 (2020); 45th Anniversary Live in London (2020); Live at Rock of Ages Festival 2016 (2020); The Symbol Remains (2020); Ghost Stories (2024)

=== Former ===
Image	Name	Years active	Instruments	Release contributions
	Andrew Winters	1967–1970	bass	St. Cecilia: The Elektra Recordings (2001); Blue Öyster Cult reissue (2001); Rarities (2016)
	David Roter	1967–1968	lead vocals; keyboards	none
	**Allen Lanier**	1967; 1968–1985; 1987–2006 (died 2013)	keyboards; rhythm and lead guitar; occasional vocals	all releases from Blue Öyster Cult (1972) to The Revölution by Night (1983), and from Imaginos (1988) to A Long Day's Night (2002); Harvester of Lives (2012); Rarities (2016); Ghost Stories (2024)
	Joe Dick	1967	drums	none
	**Albert Bouchard**	1967–1981; 1985 (Note: Both brothers returned in 2012 for a reunion concert and a show in 2016 commemorating the 40th anniversary of Agents of Fortune. Albert has otherwise reunited with the band for five additional Agents of Fortune shows the same year, three shows in New York City celebrating the band's debut album in 2022, and two brief appearances at New York shows in 2015 and 2023.)	drums (Note: Albert Bouchard does not play drums on Imaginos, only guitar, percussion and vocals); percussion; backing and lead vocals; rhythm guitar	all releases from Blue Öyster Cult (1972) to Fire of Unknown Origin (1981); Extraterrestrial Live (1982) 2 tracks; Imaginos (1988); Live 1976 (1991); St. Cecilia: The Elektra Recordings (2001); Harvester of Lives (2012); Rarities (2016); Ghost Stories (2024)
	John Wiesenthal	1967–1968	rhythm guitar; keyboards	none
	Jeff Richards	1968	lead vocals	none
	Les Braunstein	1968–1969	lead vocals; rhythm guitar	none
	**Joe Bouchard**	1970–1986	bass (Note: Joe Bouchard does not play bass on Imaginos, only keyboard and backing vocals); backing and lead vocals; keyboards; rhythm guitar	all releases from Blue Öyster Cult (1972) to Club Ninja (1985); Imaginos (1988); Live 1976 (1991); Harvester of Lives (2012); Rarities (2016); Ghost Stories (2024)
	Rick Downey	1981–1985	drums; percussion	Extraterrestrial Live (1982); The Revölution by Night (1983); Harvester of Lives (2012); Rarities (2016)
	Tommy Zvoncheck	1985–1986	keyboards; backing vocals	Club Ninja (1985); Imaginos (1988); Harvester of Lives (2012)
	Jimmy Wilcox	1985–1986	drums; percussion; backing vocals	Club Ninja (1985); Harvester of Lives (2012)
	Jon Rogers	1986; 1987–1995; 2007	bass; backing and lead vocals	Imaginos (1988); Cult Classic (1994); Heaven Forbid (1998)
	Ron Riddle	1987–1991	drums; percussion	none
	Chuck Burgi	1991–1995; 1996–1997	drums; percussion	Cult Classic (1994); Heaven Forbid (1998)
	John O'Reilly	1995–1996	drums; percussion	none
	Bobby Rondinelli	1997–2004	drums; percussion	Heaven Forbid (1998); Curse of the Hidden Mirror (2001); A Long Day's Night (2002)
	Rudy Sarzo	2007–2012	bass; backing vocals	none
	Kasim Sulton	2012–2017; 2026 (substitute for Eric Bloom)	bass; backing vocals	Hard Rock Live Cleveland 2014 (2020); 40th Anniversary - Agents of Fortune - Live 2016 (2020); iHeart Radio Theater N.Y.C. 2012 (2020); Live at Rock of Ages Festival 2016 (2020); Ghost Stories (2024)

=== Touring ===
Image	Name	Years active	Instruments	Details
	John Miceli	1992; 1997	drums; percussion	Miceli substituted for regular drummer Chuck Burgi during a concert tour in the summer of 1992, and returned following Burgi second departure in 1997.
	Greg Smith	1995	bass; backing vocals	Smith briefly toured with the group in the summer of 1995 after Jon Rogers left the band in April.
	Al Pitrelli	1999	keyboards; rhythm and lead guitar; backing vocals	Pitrelli substituted for Allen Lanier from February to March during the group's 1999 tour.
	Andy Ascolese	2026	rhythm guitar; backing vocals	Ascolese substituted for Eric Bloom in mid 2026, during a medical hiatus.

== Lineups ==
Period	Members	Releases
1967	Buck Dharma – lead guitar, lead vocals; John Wiesenthal – rhythm guitar; Allen Lanier – keyboards; Andrew Winters – bass, backing vocals; Albert Bouchard – drums, backing vocals	none
1967	Buck Dharma – guitar, lead vocals; John Wiesenthal – keyboards; Andrew Winters – bass, backing vocals; Albert Bouchard – drums, backing vocals	none
Early 1968 – mid-1969	Les Braunstein – lead vocals, rhythm guitar; Buck Dharma – lead guitar, vocals; Allen Lanier – keyboards, rhythm guitar; Andrew Winters – bass, backing vocals; Albert Bouchard – drums, backing vocals	none
Mid-1969 – summer 1970	Eric Bloom – lead vocals, "stun" (rhythm) guitar; Buck Dharma – lead guitar, vocals; Allen Lanier – keyboards, rhythm guitar; Andrew Winters – bass, backing vocals; Albert Bouchard – drums, backing vocals	St. Cecilia: The Elektra Recordings (2001)
Summer 1970 – August 1981	Eric Bloom – lead vocals, "stun" (rhythm) guitar, keyboards; Buck Dharma – lead guitar, vocals; Allen Lanier – keyboards, rhythm guitar, backing vocals; Joe Bouchard – bass, vocals; Albert Bouchard – drums, vocals	Blue Öyster Cult (1972); Tyranny and Mutation (1973); Secret Treaties (1974); On Your Feet or on Your Knees (1975); Agents of Fortune (1976); Spectres (1977); Some Enchanted Evening (1978); Mirrors (1979); Cultösaurus Erectus (1980); Fire of Unknown Origin (1981); Extraterrestrial Live (1982) – two tracks; Live 1976 (1991); Ghost Stories (2024) – all but two tracks
August 1981 – January 1985	Eric Bloom – lead vocals, "stun" (rhythm) guitar; Buck Dharma – lead guitar, vocals; Allen Lanier – keyboards, rhythm guitar, backing vocals; Joe Bouchard – bass, vocals; Rick Downey – drums, percussion	Extraterrestrial Live (1982); The Revölution by Night (1983)
February 1985	Eric Bloom – lead vocals, "stun" (rhythm) guitar; Buck Dharma – lead guitar, vocals; Allen Lanier – keyboards, rhythm guitar, backing vocals; Joe Bouchard – bass, vocals; Albert Bouchard – drums, vocals	none
April 1985 – February 1986	Eric Bloom – lead vocals, "stun" (rhythm) guitar; Buck Dharma – lead guitar, vocals; Tommy Zvoncheck – keyboards; Joe Bouchard – bass, vocals; Jimmy Wilcox – drums, percussion, backing vocals	Club Ninja (1985)
February – September 1986	Eric Bloom – lead vocals, "stun" (rhythm) guitar; Buck Dharma – lead guitar, vocals; Tommy Zvoncheck – keyboards, backing vocals; Jon Rogers – bass, backing vocals; Jimmy Wilcox – drums, percussion, backing vocals	none
Band inactive September 1986 – June 1987
June 1987 – May 1991	Eric Bloom – lead vocals, "stun" (rhythm) guitar; Buck Dharma – lead guitar, vocals; Allen Lanier – keyboards, rhythm & lead guitar, backing vocals; Jon Rogers – bass, backing vocals; Ron Riddle – drums	none
June 1991 – April 1995	Eric Bloom – lead vocals, "stun" (rhythm) guitar; Buck Dharma – lead guitar, vocals; Allen Lanier – keyboards, rhythm & lead guitar, backing vocals; Jon Rogers – bass, backing vocals; Chuck Burgi – drums, percussion, backing vocals	Bad Channels (1992); Cult Classic (1994); Heaven Forbid (1998) – three tracks
August – September 1995	Eric Bloom – lead vocals, "stun" (rhythm) guitar; Buck Dharma – lead guitar, vocals; Allen Lanier – keyboards, rhythm & lead guitar, backing vocals; Danny Miranda – bass, backing vocals; Chuck Burgi – drums, percussion, backing vocals	none
September 1995 – August 1996	Eric Bloom – lead vocals, "stun" (rhythm) guitar; Buck Dharma – lead guitar, vocals; Allen Lanier – keyboards, rhythm & lead guitar, backing vocals; Danny Miranda – bass, backing vocals; John O'Reilly – drums, percussion	none
August 1996 – February 1997	Eric Bloom – lead vocals, "stun" (rhythm) guitar; Buck Dharma – lead guitar, vocals; Allen Lanier – keyboards, rhythm & lead guitar, backing vocals; Danny Miranda – bass, backing vocals; Chuck Burgi – drums, percussion, backing vocals	Heaven Forbid (1998) – seven tracks
February 1997 – September 2004	Eric Bloom – lead vocals, "stun" (rhythm) guitar; Buck Dharma – lead guitar, vocals; Allen Lanier – keyboards, rhythm & lead guitar, backing vocals; Danny Miranda – bass, backing vocals; Bobby Rondinelli – drums, percussion	Heaven Forbid (1998) – one track; Curse of the Hidden Mirror (2001); A Long Day's Night (2002)
October 2004 – November 2006	Eric Bloom – lead vocals, "stun" (rhythm) guitar; Buck Dharma – lead guitar, vocals; Allen Lanier – keyboards, rhythm & lead guitar, backing vocals; Richie Castellano – bass, backing vocals; Jules Radino – drums, percussion	none
Early 2007	Eric Bloom – lead vocals, "stun" (rhythm) guitar; Buck Dharma – lead guitar, vocals; Richie Castellano – rhythm guitar, keyboards, backing vocals; Danny Miranda – bass, backing vocals; Jules Radino – drums, percussion	none
Mid-2007	Eric Bloom – lead vocals, "stun" (rhythm) guitar; Buck Dharma – lead guitar, vocals; Richie Castellano – rhythm guitar, keyboards, backing vocals; Jon Rogers – bass, backing vocals; Jules Radino – drums, percussion	none
June 2007 – July 2012	Eric Bloom – lead vocals, "stun" (rhythm) guitar; Buck Dharma – lead guitar, vocals; Richie Castellano – rhythm & lead guitar, keyboards, vocals; Rudy Sarzo – bass, backing vocals; Jules Radino – drums, percussion; Danny Miranda – bass, backing vocals; frequent sub for Sarzo	none
July 2012 – early 2017	Eric Bloom – lead vocals, "stun" (rhythm) guitar; Buck Dharma – lead guitar, vocals; Richie Castellano – rhythm & lead guitar, keyboards, vocals; Kasim Sulton – bass, backing vocals; Jules Radino – drums, percussion; Danny Miranda – bass, backing vocals; frequent sub for Sulton	Hard Rock Live Cleveland 2014 (2020); 40th Anniversary - Agents of Fortune - Live 2016 (2020); iHeart Radio Theater N.Y.C. 2012 (2020); Live at Rock of Ages Festival 2016 (2020); Ghost Stories (2024) – two tracks
Early 2017 – present	Eric Bloom – lead vocals, "stun" (rhythm) guitar; Buck Dharma – lead guitar, vocals; Richie Castellano – rhythm & lead guitar, keyboards, vocals; Danny Miranda – bass, backing vocals; Jules Radino – drums, percussion	45th Anniversary Live in London (2020); The Symbol Remains (2020); Ghost Stories (2024) – overdubs
