= Blue Öyster Cult discography =

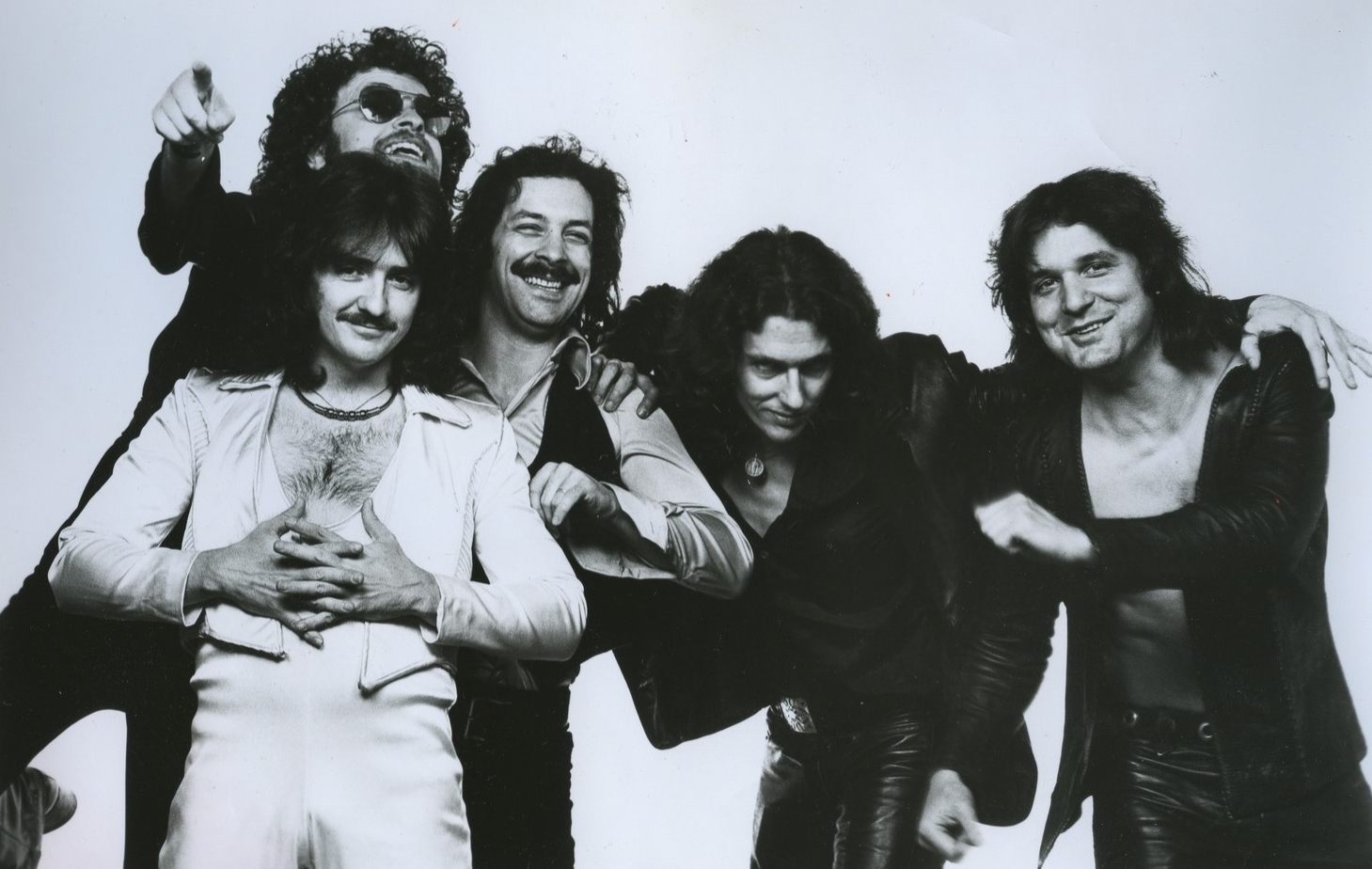
- The 1971–1981 lineup of Blue Öyster Cult, L-R: Donald "Buck Dharma" Roeser; Eric Bloom; Albert Bouchard; Allen Lanier; Joe Bouchard
- Studio albums: 16
- Live albums: 10
- Compilation albums: 21
- Singles: 32
- Music videos: 11
- Box sets: 1
- Soundtrack albums: 1

The following is the discography of the American rock band Blue Öyster Cult.

Blue Öyster Cult has released 16 studio albums, the most recent being released in 2024, entitled Ghost Stories. In 2012, the Blue Öyster Cult albums released by Columbia were re-released in a box set of 16 CDs and one DVD. The band has sold more than 24 million records worldwide, including 7 million in the United States alone.

== Albums ==
=== Studio albums ===
Title	Details	Peak chart positions					Certification
Title	Details	US	CAN	GER	SWE	UK	Certification
Blue Öyster Cult	Released: January 1972; Label: Columbia	172	—	x	—	—	
Tyranny and Mutation	Released: February 1973; Label: Columbia	122	—	x	—	—	
Secret Treaties	Released: April 5, 1974; Label: Columbia	53	—	x	—	—	US: Gold
Agents of Fortune	Released: May 21, 1976; Label: Columbia	29	28	x	10	26	CAN: Gold; US: Platinum
Spectres	Released: November 10, 1977; Label: Columbia	43	58	x	47	60	US: Gold
Mirrors	Released: June 19, 1979; Label: Columbia	44	49	x	—	46	
Cultösaurus Erectus	Released: June 14, 1980; Label: Columbia	34	77	x	—	12	
Fire of Unknown Origin	Released: June 22, 1981; Label: Columbia	24	21	x	—	29	CAN: Gold; US: Gold
The Revölution by Night	Released: November 8, 1983; Label: Columbia	93	—	x	—	95	
Club Ninja	Released: December 10, 1985; Label: Columbia	63	—	x	41	—	
Imaginos	Released: July 15, 1988; Label: Columbia	122	—	x	—	—	
Cult Classic	Released: June 10, 1994; Label: Herald	—	—	—	—	—	
Heaven Forbid	Released: March 24, 1998; Label: CMC	—	—	—	—	—	
Curse of the Hidden Mirror	Released: June 5, 2001; Label: CMC / Sanctuary	—	—	—	—	—	
The Symbol Remains	Released: October 9, 2020; Label: Frontiers	192	—	39	—	—	
Ghost Stories	Released: April 12, 2024; Label: Frontiers	—	—	94	—	—	
"—" denotes that the recording did not chart, was not released in that territory, or is uncertified. "×" denotes periods where charts did not exist or were not archived.

=== Soundtrack albums ===
Title	Details
Bad Channels	Released: August 4, 1992 (US) • 1996 (UK and Germany); Label: Moonstone (US) • Angel Air (UK) • HiQ (GER); Film: Bad Channels (released June 25, 1992)

=== Live albums ===
Title	Details	Peak chart positions					Certification
Title	Details	US	CAN	GER	SWE	UK	Certification
On Your Feet or on Your Knees	Released: February 27, 1975; Label: Columbia	22	22	x	—	—	US: Gold
Some Enchanted Evening	Released: September 1978; Label: Columbia	44	43	x	—	18	US: Platinum
Extraterrestrial Live	Released: April 1982; Label: Columbia	29	—	x	—	39	
Live 1976	Released: 1991; Label: Castle (Europe)	—	—	—	—	—	
A Long Day's Night	Released: September 24, 2002; Label: Sanctuary	—	—	—	—	—	
Hard Rock Live Cleveland 2014	Released: January 24, 2020; Label: Frontiers	—	—	—	—	—	
iHeart Radio Theater N.Y.C. 2012	Released: March 3, 2020; Label: Frontiers	—	—	—	—	—	
40th Anniversary – Agents of Fortune – Live 2016	Released: March 6, 2020; Label: Frontiers	—	—	—	—	—	
45th Anniversary – Live in London	Released: August 7, 2020; Label: Frontiers	—	—	89	—	—	
Live at Rock of Ages Festival – July 30th 2016	Released: August 27, 2020; Label: Frontiers	—	—	—	—	—	
50th Anniversary Live – First Night	Released: October 4, 2023; Label: Frontiers	—	—	—	—	—	
50th Anniversary Live – Second Night	Released: Aug. 9, 2024; Label: Frontiers	—	—	—	—	—	
50th Anniversary Live – Third Night	Released: Dec. 13, 2024; Label: Frontiers	—	—	—	—	—	
"—" denotes that the recording did not chart, was not released in that territory, or is uncertified. "×" denotes periods where charts did not exist or were not archived.

=== Video albums ===
Title	Details
Black and Blue	Released: 1981; Label: PolyGram; Format: VHS, Betamax, LaserDisc
A Long Day's Night	Released: September 24, 2002; Label: Sanctuary; Format: DVD
Some OTHER Enchanted Evening	Released: 2007; Label: Legacy; Format: DVD

=== Compilation albums ===
Title	Details
Career of Evil: The Metal Years	Released: March 13, 1990; Label: Columbia (US; Canada) • CBS (Europe)
On Flame with Rock and Roll	Released: 1990; Label: CBS Special Products
Workshop of the Telescopes	Released: September 26, 1995; Label: Columbia / Sony
Don't Fear The Reaper	Released: 1997; Label: Sony Music Special Products
Super Hits	Released: June 21, 1998; Label: Legacy / Columbia (Europe)
Don't Fear the Reaper: The Best of Blue Öyster Cult	Released: 1983 (Original); February 8, 2000 (Remastered); Label: Legacy / Columbia • SME (Japan)
St. Cecilia: The Elektra Recordings (2001) (as "Stalk-Forrest Group")	Released: April 23, 2001; Label: Elektra / Rhino
Then and Now	Released: March 18, 2003; Label: CMC International
The Essential Blue Öyster Cult	Released: April 1, 2003; Label: Sony
Are You Ready to Rock?	Released: August 21, 2003; Label: Sony
Shooting Shark – The Best of Blue Öyster Cult	Released: May 24, 2004; Label: Sony (Germany)
Extended Versions: The Encore Collection	Released: October 5, 2004; Label: BMG
The Singles Collection	Released: July 12, 2005; Label: BMG / Columbia (Europe)
Collections	Released: April 3, 2006; Label: BMG (Germany; Russia)
The Best of Blue Öyster Cult	Released: June 6, 2006; Label: Direct Source (Canada)
Alive in America: Pt. 1	Released: October 3, 2006; Label: Rdeg
Greatest Hits	Released: July 28, 2008; Label: BMG (Europe)
The Cöllection	Released: November 2, 2010; Label: Camden (Europe)
Playlist: The Very Best of Blue Öyster Cult	Released: January 26, 2010; Label: Columbia / Legacy
Setlist: The Very Best of Blue Öyster Cult Live	Released: July 13, 2010; Label: Sony / Legacy
Rarities Vol. 1	Released: November 24, 2017; Label: Columbia / Real Gone Music; Format: LP; Limited edition
Rarities Vol. 2	Released: April 28, 2018; Label: Columbia / Real Gone Music; Format: LP; Limited edition

=== Box sets ===
Title	Details	Peak chart positions
Title	Details	GER
The Complete Columbia Albums Collectiön	Released: October 30, 2012; Label: Legacy (Europe)	92

== Singles ==
Year	Title	Peak chart positions							Certifications	Album
Year	Title	US	US (Cashbox)	US Main. Rock	US Rock	CAN	IRL	UK	Certifications	Album
1972	"Cities on Flame with Rock and Roll"	—	—	x	x	—	—	—		Blue Öyster Cult
1973	"Hot Rails to Hell"	—	—	x	x	—	—	—		Tyranny and Mutation
1974	"Career of Evil"	—	—	x	x	—	—	—		Secret Treaties
1974	"Flaming Telepaths"	—	—	x	x	—	—	—		Secret Treaties
1975	"Born to Be Wild"	—	—	x	x	—	—	—		On Your Feet or on Your Knees
1975	"Then Came the Last Days of May"	—	—	x	x	—	—	—		On Your Feet or on Your Knees
1976	"(Don't Fear) The Reaper"	12	7	x	11 (Note: "(Don't Fear) The Reaper" peaked on the Rock Charts on November 18, 2017)	7	17	16	RIAA: 6× Platinum; UK: Platinum	Agents of Fortune
1976	"Sinful Love"	—	—	x	x	—	—	—		Agents of Fortune
1977	"This Ain't the Summer of Love"	—	—	x	x	—	—	—		Agents of Fortune
1977	"Goin' Through the Motions"	—	—	x	x	—	—	—		Spectres
1978	"Godzilla"	—	—	x	x	—	—	—	RIAA: Platinum	Spectres
1978	"I Love the Night"	—	—	x	x	—	—	—		Spectres
1978	"We Gotta Get Out of This Place"	—	—	x	x	—	—	—		Some Enchanted Evening
1979	"In Thee"	74	92	x	x	—	—	—		Mirrors
1979	"Mirrors"	—	—	x	x	—	—	—		Mirrors
1979	"You're Not the One (I Was Looking For)"	—	—	x	x	—	—	—		Mirrors
1980	"Fallen Angel"	—	—	x	x	—	—	—		Cultösaurus Erectus
1980	"The Marshall Plan"	—	—	x	x	—	—	—		Cultösaurus Erectus
1980	"Deadline"	—	—	x	x	—	—	—		Cultösaurus Erectus
1981	"Burnin' for You"	40	34	1	27	47	—	76	RIAA: 2× Platinum	Fire of Unknown Origin
1982	"Roadhouse Blues"	—	—	24	x	—	—	—		Extraterrestrial Live
1983	"Take Me Away"	—	—	11	x	—	—	—		The Revölution by Night
1983	"Shooting Shark"	83	—	16	x	—	—	97		The Revölution by Night
1985	"White Flags"	—	—	—	x	—	—	—		Club Ninja
1986	"Dancin' in the Ruins"	—	—	9	x	—	—	—		Club Ninja
1986	"Perfect Water"	—	—	—	x	—	—	—		Club Ninja
2024	"So Supernatural"	—	—	—	x	—	—	—		Ghost Stories
"—" denotes a recording that did not chart or was not released in that territory. "×" denotes periods where charts did not exist or were not archived.

== Other charted songs ==
Year	Title	Peak chart positions	Album
Year	Title	US Main. Rock	Album
1980	"Black Blade"	x	Cultösaurus Erectus
1981	"Joan Crawford"	49	Fire of Unknown Origin

== Music videos ==
Year	Title	Ref.	Notes
1981	"The Marshall Plan"	link	(Note: Released as part of the film Black and Blue)
1981	"Burnin' for You"	link	
1981	"Joan Crawford"	link	
1983	"Take Me Away"	link	
1983	"Shooting Shark"	link	
1986	"Dancin' in the Ruins"	link	
1988	"Astronomy"	link	(Note: Unreleased in the United States; Released in the United Kingdom)
2020	"That Was Me"	link	
2020	"Box in My Head"	link	
2020	"Tainted Blood"	link	
2020	"The Alchemist"	link	
