= Black and Blue (video) =

Video by Black Sabbath and Blue Öyster Cult
- Released: 1981
- Recorded: Nassau Coliseum, Long Island, New York, 1980
- Genres: Hard rock, heavy metal
- Length: 90 minutes
- Label: PolyGram
- Producers: George Hegelias Harrison; Sandy Pearlman; Steve Schenck

Black Sabbath video chronology
Never Say Die (1978)	Black and Blue (1981)	The Black Sabbath Story, Vol. 1 (1992)

Blue Öyster Cult video chronology
Black and Blue (1981)	Live 1976 (1991)

Black and Blue is a live video by hard rock bands Black Sabbath and Blue Öyster Cult, filmed during their 1980 co-headlining tour of the United States, known as the "Black and Blue Tour". The film was originally released to theaters in 1981 as a concert film. It was later released on VHS, Betamax, and LaserDisc video format. It has not been officially released on DVD.

== Film and video releases ==
In 1980, Black Sabbath co-headlined a number of the U.S. shows on their worldwide "Heaven & Hell Tour" with Blue Öyster Cult, at the suggestion of Sandy Pearlman, who was managing both bands at the time. These shows became known as the "Black and Blue Tour" and were very well attended, often ranking in Billboard magazine's weekly "Top Boxoffice" charts.

The two bands' October 17, 1980 performances at Nassau Veterans Memorial Coliseum in Hempstead, New York were filmed and used as part of the December 6, 1980 episode of Don Kirshner's Rock Concert. The recorded footage was edited together into the concert film Black and Blue, which was released to theaters in 1981 after the conclusion of the tour. Following its initial release, the film played for some time on the theatrical midnight movie circuit in the United States. In the 1980s, it was released for the home video market in VHS format by Polygram Video in the UK, and by Warner Bros. in US. It was also released in laserdisc format by Polygram in UK and Warner Bros. in Japan. According to Martin Popoff, a Betamax version was also issued.

In 2002, a DVD release of the film was announced by Castle Pictures, and was available for pre-order from online merchants. However, the release was postponed several times before finally being cancelled in January 2003.

In 2004, a second announcement was made of an upcoming DVD release, this time by Universal Video. However, the release was again postponed and then cancelled at the last minute. A few copies were sold by some record stores in European countries that had received advance shipments before the withdrawal. Since then, there has been no official DVD release of the film, although various bootlegs are available.

Several sources, including Castle Pictures, have indicated that the DVD has not been released because Black Sabbath, in particular Tony Iommi, do not want it released. The 2011 book Black Sabbath FAQ by Martin Popoff contained statements from members of Blue Öyster Cult about the video, with Joe Bouchard saying that Iommi and Sabbath opposed release of the video, and Eric Bloom opining that the video was not very good due to the lack of post-production, which was too expensive at the time the film was made. On a 2013 episode of That Metal Show, Buck Dharma of Blue Öyster Cult talked very minimally about the release and said to his knowledge, the reason it has not been re-released is because the members of Black Sabbath don't want it being distributed, for reasons unknown to Dharma.

== Tracks ==
1. "The Marshall Plan" (Eric Bloom, Albert Bouchard, Joe Bouchard, Allen Lanier, Donald Roeser)
  - performed by Blue Öyster Cult
2. "War Pigs" (Geezer Butler, Tony Iommi, Ozzy Osbourne, Bill Ward)
  - performed by Black Sabbath
3. "Neon Knights" (Butler, Ronnie James Dio, Iommi, Ward)
  - performed by Black Sabbath
4. "N.I.B." (Butler, Iommi, Osbourne, Ward)
  - performed by Black Sabbath
5. "Doctor Music" (J. Bouchard, Richard Meltzer, Roeser)
  - performed by Blue Öyster Cult
6. "Cities on Flame" (A. Bouchard, Sandy Pearlman, Roeser)
  - performed by Blue Öyster Cult
7. "Divine Wind" (Roeser)
  - performed by Blue Öyster Cult
8. "Iron Man" (Butler, Iommi, Osbourne, Ward)
  - performed by Black Sabbath
9. "Paranoid" (Butler, Iommi, Osbourne, Ward)
  - performed by Black Sabbath
10. "Godzilla" (Roeser)
  - performed by Blue Öyster Cult
11. "Roadhouse Blues" (John Densmore, Robby Krieger, Ray Manzarek, Jim Morrison)
  - performed by Blue Öyster Cult
12. "Heaven and Hell" (Butler, Dio, Iommi, Ward)
  - performed by Black Sabbath
13. "Born To Be Wild" (Mars Bonfire)
  - performed by Blue Öyster Cult
14. "Die Young" (Butler, Dio, Iommi, Ward)
  - performed by Black Sabbath

== Personnel ==
=== Black Sabbath ===
- Ronnie James Dio - vocals
- Tony Iommi - guitar
- Geoff Nicholls - keyboards
- Geezer Butler - bass
- Vinny Appice - drums

=== Blue Öyster Cult ===
- Eric Bloom: lead vocals, rhythm guitar, keyboards
- Buck Dharma: lead guitar, vocals
- Allen Lanier: keyboards, guitar
- Joe Bouchard: bass, vocals
- Albert Bouchard: drums, percussion, vocals
