= A Long Day's Night =

2002 live album by Blue Öyster Cult

Video by Blue Öyster Cult
- Released: September 24, 2002 (U.S.)
- Recorded: June 21, 2002; Navy Pier/Skyline Stage; Chicago, Illinois
- Genres: Hard rock; heavy metal; psychedelic rock
- Length: 120 minutes
- Label: Sanctuary
- Director: Michael Drumm
- Producer: Steve Schenck

Blue Öyster Cult chronology
Live 1976 (1991)	A Long Day's Night (2002)

Professional ratings
Review scores
Source	Rating
AllMusic	4/5 stars
Collector's Guide to Heavy Metal	8/10

A Long Day's Night

Live album by Blue Öyster Cult
- Released: September 24, 2002 (U.S.)
- Recorded: June 21, 2002; Navy Pier/Skyline Stage; Chicago, Illinois
- Genres: Hard rock; heavy metal
- Length: 78:02
- Label: Sanctuary
- Producer: Steve Schenck

Blue Öyster Cult chronology
Curse of the Hidden Mirror (2001)	A Long Day's Night (2002)	The Essential Blue Öyster Cult (2003)

A Long Day's Night is a live album by American hard rock band Blue Öyster Cult, recorded in Chicago, Illinois, on 21 June 2002. The title is a reference to the album being recorded during the summer solstice, the longest day of the year.

The concert was released as a DVD and a CD; the CD does not include seven of the songs included on the DVD-release ("E.T.I.," "Harvester of Eyes," "Flaming Telepaths," "Then Came the Last Days of May," "ME 262" and the encore songs "Dominance and Submission" and "The Red and the Black"), while the CD-release featured "Astronomy", not available on the DVD.

In 2004, 10 tracks from this concert were released again as Extended Versions: The Encore Collection.

== CD track listing ==
1. "Stairway to the Stars" (Albert Bouchard, Donald Roeser, Richard Meltzer) – 3:53
2. "Burnin' for You" (Roeser, Meltzer) – 4:39
3. "O.D.'d on Life Itself" (Eric Bloom, A. Bouchard, Joe Bouchard, Sandy Pearlman) – 4:41
4. "Dance on Stilts" (Roeser, John Shirley) – 5:49
5. "Buck's Boogie" (Roeser) – 6:26
6. "Mistress of the Salmon Salt (Quicklime Girl)" (A. Bouchard, Pearlman) – 4:58
7. "Harvest Moon" (Roeser) – 4:42
8. "Astronomy" (J. Bouchard, A. Bouchard, Pearlman) – 10:19
9. "Cities on Flame with Rock and Roll" (Roeser, A. Bouchard, Pearlman) – 5:53
10. "Perfect Water" (Roeser, Jim Carroll) – 5:22
11. "Lips in the Hills" (Roeser, Bloom, Meltzer) – 4:22
12. "Godzilla" (Roeser) – 8:44
13. "(Don't Fear) The Reaper" (Roeser) – 8:14

== DVD track listing ==
1. "Stairway to the Stars"
2. "Burnin' for You"
3. "O.D.'d on Life Itself"
4. "E.T.I. (Extra Terrestrial Intelligence)"
5. "Dance on Stilts"
6. "Harvester of Eyes"
7. "Buck's Boogie"
8. "Mistress of the Salmon Salt (Quicklime Girl)"
9. "Flaming Telepaths"
10. "Harvest Moon"
11. "Then Came the Last Days of May"
12. "Cities on Flame with Rock and Roll"
13. "ME 262"
14. "Perfect Water"
15. "Lips in the Hills"
16. "Godzilla"
17. "(Don't Fear) The Reaper"
18. "Dominance and Submission"
19. "The Red and the Black"

== Personnel ==
- Eric Bloom – lead vocals, stun guitars, keyboards
- Allen Lanier – keyboards, rhythm guitars, some lead guitar on "Then Came The Last Days Of May", background vocals
- Donald "Buck Dharma" Roeser – lead guitars, vocals
- Danny Miranda – bass, background vocals
- Bobby Rondinelli – drums, percussion
