= Some Enchanted Evening (Blue Öyster Cult album) =

1978 live album by Blue Öyster Cult

Live album by Blue Öyster Cult
- Released: September 13, 1978
- Recorded: April 9, 11, 13 and June 1, 1978
- Genres: Hard rock; heavy metal
- Length: 36:04
- Label: Columbia
- Producers: Sandy Pearlman; Murray Krugman; Blue Öyster Cult

Blue Öyster Cult chronology
| Spectres (1977) | Some Enchanted Evening (1978) | Mirrors (1979) |

Blue Öyster Cult live chronology
| On Your Feet or on Your Knees (1975) | Some Enchanted Evening (1978) | Extraterrestrial Live (1982) |

Singles from Some Enchanted Evening
- 1. "We Gotta Get Out of This Place" Released: October 1978 (US)

Some OTHER Enchanted Evening

Video by Blue Öyster Cult
- Released: 2007
- Recorded: July 14th,1978
- Venue: Capital Centre (Largo, Maryland)
- Genres: Hard rock; heavy metal
- Length: 56:55
- Label: Legacy Recordings
- Producer: Bruce Dickinson

Blue Öyster Cult chronology
| A Long Day's Night (2002) | Some OTHER Enchanted Evening (2007) |

Professional ratings
Review scores
| Source | Rating |
|---|---|
| AllMusic | 4/5 stars |
| AllMusic | (DVD) |
| Collector's Guide to Heavy Metal | 6/10 |
| Q | 3/5 stars |
| Record Mirror | 2/5 stars |
| Rolling Stone | (favorable) |

Some Enchanted Evening is the second live album by the American rock band Blue Öyster Cult, released on September 13, 1978. The album was certified for a million units sold in the United States. The album's seven tracks were recorded at various locations in the United States and England.

The album was re-issued on CD in early 2007 on Legacy Recordings and included seven previously unreleased bonus tracks recorded in various locations around the US, along with a DVD entitled Some OTHER Enchanted Evening, which featured a previously unreleased performance videotaped at the Capital Centre in Largo, Maryland on July 14, 1978.

== Track listing ==
Side one
| No. | Title | Writer(s) | Recorded at | Length |
|---|---|---|---|---|
| 1. | "R.U. Ready 2 Rock" | Albert Bouchard, Sandy Pearlman | Atlanta, Georgia, April 13, 1978 | 5:29 |
| 2. | "E.T.I. (Extra Terrestrial Intelligence)" | Donald Roeser, Pearlman | Columbus, Georgia, April 11, 1978 | 5:04 |
| 3. | "Astronomy" | A. Bouchard, Joe Bouchard, Pearlman | Columbus, Georgia, April 11, 1978 | 8:18 |

Side two
| No. | Title | Writer(s) | Recorded at | Length |
|---|---|---|---|---|
| 4. | "Kick Out the Jams" (MC5 cover) | Michael Davis, Wayne Kramer, Fred "Sonic" Smith, Dennis Thompson, Rob Tyner | Atlanta, Georgia, April 13, 1978 | 3:03 |
| 5. | "Godzilla" | Roeser | Newcastle, England, June 1, 1978 | 4:10 |
| 6. | "(Don't Fear) The Reaper" | Roeser | Barton Coliseum Little Rock, Arkansas, April 9, 1978 | 5:51 |
| 7. | "We Gotta Get Out of This Place" (The Animals cover) | Barry Mann, Cynthia Weil | Newcastle, England, June 1, 1978 | 4:09 |

2007 CD re-issue bonus tracks
| No. | Title | Writer(s) | Recorded at | Length |
|---|---|---|---|---|
| 8. | "ME 262" | Eric Bloom, Roeser, Pearlman | Rochester, New York, December 31, 1977 | 3:24 |
| 9. | "Harvester of Eyes" | Bloom, Roeser, Richard Meltzer | Little Rock, Arkansas, September 4, 1978 | 4:35 |
| 10. | "Hot Rails to Hell" | J. Bouchard | Detroit, Michigan, January 30, 1978 | 5:01 |
| 11. | "This Ain't the Summer of Love" | A. Bouchard, Murray Krugman, Don Waller | Detroit, Michigan, January 30, 1978 | 2:48 |
| 12. | "5 Guitars" | | Detroit, Michigan, January 30, 1978 | 8:34 |
| 13. | "Born to Be Wild" (Steppenwolf cover) | Mars Bonfire | Detroit, Michigan, January 30, 1978 | 6:30 |
| 14. | "We Gotta Get Out of This Place" (alternate version) | | Boston, Massachusetts, January 31, 1978 | 4:36 |
| Total length: | | | | 71:32 |

== Some OTHER Enchanted Evening (DVD) ==
| No. | Title | Length |
|---|---|---|
| 1. | "R.U. Ready 2 Rock" | 5:42 |
| 2. | "E.T.I. (Extra Terrestrial Intelligence)" | 5:09 |
| 3. | "Harvester of Eyes" | 3:54 |
| 4. | "We Gotta Get Out of This Place" | 4:05 |
| 5. | "Golden Age of Leather" | 6:48 |
| 6. | "Astronomy" | 8:30 |
| 7. | "ME 262" | 3:08 |
| 8. | "Kick Out the Jams" | 2:55 |
| 9. | "This Ain't the Summer of Love" | 5:38 |
| 10. | "5 Guitars" | 5:05 |
| 11. | "Born to Be Wild" | 5:56 |

- Filmed on July 14, 1978, at the Capital Centre, Largo, Maryland

== Personnel ==
Blue Öyster Cult

- Eric Bloom – lead vocals on tracks 1–5, 7–9, 11, 13–14, stun guitar, keyboards
- Donald "Buck Dharma" Roeser – lead guitar, lead vocals on tracks 6
- Allen Lanier – keyboards, guitar, mixing
- Joe Bouchard – bass, lead vocals on track 10
- Albert Bouchard – drums, guitar, backing vocals

Production

- Sandy Pearlman – producer, mixing
- Murray Krugman – producer
- Corky Stasiak – engineer, mixing
- Jay Krugman – engineer
- George Geranios – live sound, DVD live mix
- Bruce Dickinson – re-issue producer
- Vic Anesini – remastering

== Charts ==
| Chart (1978) | Peak position |
|---|---|
| Canada Top Albums/CDs (RPM) | 43 |
| UK Albums (Official Charts) | 18 |
| US Billboard 200 | 44 |

| Chart (2007) | Peak position |
|---|---|
| UK Rock & Metal Albums (Official Charts) | 31 |

== Certifications ==
| Region | Certification | Certified units/sales |
|---|---|---|
| United States (RIAA) | Platinum | 1,000,000^{^} |
^{^} Shipments figures based on certification alone.
