= Then Came the Last Days of May =

Song by Blue Öyster Cult

from the album Blue Öyster Cult
- Released: January 1972
- Recorded: October 1971
- Genre: Blues rock
- Length: 3:31
- Label: Columbia
- Songwriter: Buck Dharma
- Producers: Murray Krugman, Sandy Pearlman, David Lucas

"Then Came the Last Days of May" is a song by American rock band Blue Öyster Cult, released on their self-titled debut album in 1972. The song's lyrics were based on an event involving lead guitarist Buck Dharma's friends. In an interview with Songfacts he said, "In those days, for middle class/collegiate-type people to get involved in drug sales was pretty unusual. It was an awful story - they went out to Tucson, Arizona, met up with some crooks, and got killed. The aspect of 'good kids gone bad' was a big part of that".

It has been a frequent live staple of the band as a showcase for Buck Dharma's guitar soloing skills.

== Background ==
In an interview with The Austin Chronicle, Dharma said of the song:

It was still in the Soft White Underbelly days when we were playing dances at Stony Brook University [on Long Island] for our sustenance money. Three Stony Brook students went to Tucson, Arizona, to buy some bulk marijuana for resale. I don't know how they got whatever contact they had, but it was two brothers – scions from one of the better-to-do families in Tucson. They never intended to sell them any pot. They just wanted to rip 'em off and shoot 'em, which they did. They took them out to the desert and shot them. It was three guys, and one managed to survive and get back to the highway ... I wrote the story from basically the newspaper accounts of the Long Island newspaper, Newsday ... There's a personal connection, too. I knew one of the guys casually from Stony Brook University when we were hanging out there.

According to the band, the song was a large part of the reason why they were signed to Columbia Records, due to the label's president Clive Davis' love for the song, which he called exquisite.

== Reception ==
Classic Rock magazine considered the song to be among the band's classics.

In 2013, Ultimate Classic Rock ranked "Then Came the Last Days of May" as Blue Öyster Cult's 8th best song, noting psychedelic rock elements remaining from the time the band was still known as Stalk-Forrest Group, as well as "a tasty solo and some flavorful backing vocals".

Invisible Oranges considered the song to be "undeniably the masterpiece" of the band's self-titled debut album, writing that it excels because of its minimalism, as well as that its concluding solo should "eternally solidify Buck Dharma as the esteemed undertaker of American guitar culture."

Goldmine magazine described the song as dark and reminiscent of American rock band the Doors, coupled with "all sorts of cool, twangy guitar licks".

== Legacy ==
The English new wave band Tears for Fears were formed after Roland Orzabal heard Curt Smith sing "Then Came the Last Days of May".

== Personnel ==
- Eric Bloom – stun guitar, backing vocals
- Donald "Buck Dharma" Roeser – lead vocals, lead guitar
- Joe Bouchard – bass, backing vocals
- Albert Bouchard – drums, backing vocals
- Allen Lanier – rhythm guitar
