= Mirrors (Blue Öyster Cult album) =

Studio album by Blue Öyster Cult
- Released: June 19, 1979
- Recorded: 1979
- Studios: Kendun, Burbank, California; CBS, New York City; The Record Plant, Los Angeles, California
- Genres: Pop rock; hard rock
- Length: 36:34
- Label: Columbia
- Producer: Tom Werman

Blue Öyster Cult chronology
Some Enchanted Evening (1978)	Mirrors (1979)	Cultösaurus Erectus (1980)

Singles from Mirrors
- 1. "Mirrors" Released: 17 August 1979 (UK); 2. "In Thee" Released: August 1979 (US); 3. "Moon Crazy" Released: 1979 (Japan); 4. "You're Not the One (I Was Looking For)" Released: November 1979

Mirrors is the sixth studio album by American rock band Blue Öyster Cult, released on June 19, 1979. It was the first BÖC album not produced by long-time producer and manager Sandy Pearlman, instead being produced by Tom Werman.

== Background ==
After the success of 1976's Platinum Agents of Fortune, 1977's Gold Spectres and 1978's Platinum live effort Some Enchanted Evening, the fact that Mirrors struggled to reach Gold status disappointed band and label alike. According to interviews with the band and production staff, the intent for this album was to make a high-charting record with glossy production; however, the backlash from this attempt led to the band's future pairing with Martin Birch and an attempt to return to a darker sound.

== Artwork ==
The album front cover image is a photorealistic painting by Loren Salazar, of a side-view mirror. The album's inner sleeve is an image from the house of mirrors scene in ‘’The Lady From Shanghai’’.

== Songs ==
Allen Lanier's acoustic ballad "In Thee" charted at No. 74. The song's line "Jim says some destinies should not be delivered" references the Jim Carroll Band song "Day and Night."

"The Great Sun Jester" was co-written by Eric Bloom, John Trivers, and British fantasy/science-fiction author Michael Moorcock based on Moorcock's novel The Fireclown. This would be the first of several songs that Moorcock would co-write with the band.

== Critical reception ==
Professional ratings
Review scores
Source	Rating
AllMusic	2.5/5 stars
Christgau's Record Guide	C
The Collector's Guide to Heavy Metal	10/10
MusicHound Rock: The Essential Album Guide	2/5 stars
Rolling Stone	(mixed)
The Rolling Stone Album Guide	2/5 stars

The Bangor Daily News deemed the album "a relative failure," writing that "the hooks come one after another, but with little power behind them."

== Track listing ==
Side one
No.	Title	Writer(s)	Lead vocals	Length
1.	"Dr. Music"	Joe Bouchard, Donald Roeser, Richard Meltzer	Eric Bloom	3:10
2.	"The Great Sun Jester"	Bloom, Michael Moorcock, John Trivers	Bloom	4:48
3.	"In Thee"	Allen Lanier	Roeser	3:48
4.	"Mirrors"	Roeser, Bruce Abbott	Roeser	3:44
5.	"Moon Crazy"	J. Bouchard	J. Bouchard	4:06

Side two
No.	Title	Writer(s)	Lead vocals	Length
1.	"The Vigil"	Roeser, Sandra Roeser	Roeser	6:25
2.	"I Am the Storm"	J. Bouchard, Ronald Binder	Bloom	3:42
3.	"You're Not the One (I Was Looking For)"	Albert Bouchard, Caryn Bouchard	A. Bouchard	3:14
4.	"Lonely Teardrops"	Lanier	Roeser	3:37

== Personnel ==
Blue Öyster Cult

- Eric Bloom – rhythm guitar, vocals
- Donald "Buck Dharma" Roeser – lead guitar, vocals
- Allen Lanier – keyboards, guitar
- Joe Bouchard – bass, vocals
- Albert Bouchard – drums, vocals

Additional musicians

- Mickey Raphael – harmonica on "Dr. Music"
- Jai Winding – strings on "In Thee"
- Genya Ravan and Ellen Foley – background vocals on "Dr. Music" and "Mirrors"
- Wendy Webb – background vocals on "Lonely Teardrops"

Production

- Tom Werman – producer
- Gary Ladinsky – engineer, mixing

== Charts ==
Chart (1979)	Peak position
Canada Top Albums/CDs (RPM)	49
UK Albums (Official Charts)	46
US Billboard 200	44
