= Career of Evil (disambiguation) =

Career of Evil is a novel by J. K. Rowling published in 2015.

Career of Evil may also refer to:

- "Career of Evil" (song), a song by Blue Öyster Cult
- Career of Evil: The Metal Years, a compilation album by Blue Öyster Cult
