= Godzilla (Blue Öyster Cult song) =

- Japan single picture sleeve

Single by Blue Öyster Cult

from the album Spectres
- B-side: "Nosferatu"
- Released: November 1977 (album); February 1978 (single)
- Recorded: 1977
- Genre: Heavy metal; hard rock
- Length: 3:41
- Label: Columbia
- Songwriter: Donald Roeser a.k.a. Buck Dharma
- Producers: Murray Krugman; Sandy Pearlman; David Lucas

Blue Öyster Cult singles chronology
"Goin' Through the Motions" (1977)	"Godzilla" (1977)	"We Gotta Get out of This Place" (1978)

"Godzilla" is a single by U.S. hard rock band Blue Öyster Cult, the first track on the band's fifth studio album Spectres. The lyrics are a tongue-in-cheek tribute to the popular movie monster of the same name. The single release had a picture sleeve featuring a promotional still from the movie Godzilla vs. the Sea Monster.

Despite its failure to chart, the song received significant airplay on rock radio stations and soon became a sleeper hit. "Godzilla", along with "(Don't Fear) The Reaper" and "Burnin' for You," is one of the band's best-known songs and has become a staple of its live performances. It has been covered by bands such as moe., Racer X, Fu Manchu, The Smashing Pumpkins, Sebastian Bach, Double Experience and Fighting Gravity.

== Reception ==
Cash Box called it "a clever rocker tale of Godzilla...with a strong, catchy hook, excellent guitar and special effects." AllMusic called it a "sturdy, tongue-in-cheek rocker" and said "[t]he melody captures the bombast of old-fashioned monster movie music [...]".

== History ==
In response to the song's absence from the 1998 Godzilla soundtrack, Blue Öyster Cult members Eric Bloom and Buck Dharma created their own parody called "NoZilla", released only to radio stations.

It was the walk up song for New York Yankees slugger Hideki Matsui from 2003 to 2009.

In 2019, a cover of the song, sung by Serj Tankian, was featured in the credits of Godzilla: King of the Monsters, marking the first usage of the song in a Godzilla film.

== Personnel ==
- Eric Bloom – co-lead vocals, stun guitar
- Buck Dharma – co-lead vocals, lead guitar
- Joe Bouchard – bass guitar, background vocals
- Albert Bouchard – drums, background vocals
- Allen Lanier – rhythm guitar

== Certifications ==
Region	Certification	Certified units/sales
United States (RIAA)	Platinum	1,000,000^{‡}
^{‡} Sales+streaming figures based on certification alone.
