= Never Say Die (video) =

Video by Black Sabbath
- Released: video – 1980; DVD – 2004
- Recorded: 10 June 1978
- Genre: Heavy metal
- Label: Sanctuary

Black Sabbath video chronology
| Never Say Die (1980) | Black and Blue (1980) |

Professional ratings
Review scores
| Source | Rating |
|---|---|
| Allmusic | link |

Never Say Die is a live video by the English heavy metal band Black Sabbath. It was recorded on 10 June 1978, on the Never Say Die! tour, at London's Hammersmith Odeon. It was directed by Brian Wiseman and produced by Martin Baker.

In the UK it was one of the earliest music home videos, being released on both Betamax and VHS formats. The latter was repackaged and reissued several times. It was released in Japan on LaserDisc, and later released on DVD. The running time is about 60 minutes. It would be unusual if the entire show had not been filmed before editing, although the DVD release was the same as the videotape and LaserDisc releases. It is unknown whether the full concert master recording still exists.

The original VHS, released by VCL in a black cardboard sleeve in 1980, was said to contain the tracks "N.I.B." and "Fairies Wear Boots" and, according to the original cover (see image), not "Children of the Grave". However, the video contains "Children of the Grave". The original cover is therefore incorrect. Copies of this VHS are now extremely rare, especially those with the original incorrect track listing.

The video's soundtrack was bootlegged as Angels and Devils, appended with four songs from a Japanese radio broadcast of the Tokyo 18 November 1980 show on the Heaven & Hell Tour.

== Track listing ==
1. "Symptom of the Universe"
2. "War Pigs"
3. "Snowblind"
4. "Never Say Die"
5. "Black Sabbath"
6. "Dirty Women"
7. "Rock 'n' Roll Doctor"
8. "Electric Funeral"
9. "Children of the Grave"
10. "Paranoid"

== Personnel ==
- Ozzy Osbourne – vocals
- Tony Iommi – guitars
- Geezer Butler – bass
- Bill Ward – drums
