= Spectres (album) =

Studio album by Blue Öyster Cult
- Released: November 1977
- Recorded: July–September 1977
- Studio: The Record Plant (New York City)
- Genres: Hard rock; occult rock; heavy metal
- Length: 40:29
- Label: Columbia
- Producers: Murray Krugman, Sandy Pearlman, David Lucas, Blue Öyster Cult

Blue Öyster Cult chronology
Agents of Fortune (1976)	Spectres (1977)	Some Enchanted Evening (1978)

Singles from Spectres
- 1. "Goin' Through the Motions" Released: December 1977 (US); 2. "Godzilla" Released: February 1978 (US); 3. "I Love the Night" Released: 4 August 1978 (UK)

Spectres is the fifth studio album by American rock band Blue Öyster Cult, released in November 1977 by Columbia Records. The album features one of the band's biggest hits, concert staple "Godzilla," and was certified gold by the RIAA on January 19, 1978.

The cover art features lasers, which Blue Öyster Cult used in their live shows at that time.

A remastered version was released on February 13, 2007, which included four previously unreleased outtakes from the Spectres sessions as bonus tracks.

== Critical reception ==
Professional ratings
Review scores
Source	Rating
AllMusic	3.5/5 stars
Christgau's Record Guide	B+
Collector's Guide to Heavy Metal	10/10
Q	4/5 stars
The Rolling Stone Album Guide	2.5/5 stars

Record World called the single "Goin' Through the Motions," which was co-written by Mott the Hoople singer Ian Hunter, a "thumping, hand-clapping pop-rocker." AllMusic said it's "[...] a surprisingly delicate song that balanced yearning verse melodies with a sing-along chorus." They also called it "a standout track" on the album.

== Cover versions ==
Welsh singer Bonnie Tyler covered "Goin’ Through the Motions" on her album Faster Than the Speed of Night.

== Track listing ==
Side one
No.	Title	Writer(s)	Lead vocals	Length
1.	"Godzilla"	Donald Roeser	Roeser, Eric Bloom	3:41
2.	"Golden Age of Leather"	Roeser, Bruce Abbott	Roeser, Bloom	5:53
3.	"Death Valley Nights"	Albert Bouchard, Richard Meltzer	A. Bouchard	4:07
4.	"Searchin' for Celine"	Allen Lanier	Bloom	3:35
5.	"Fireworks"	A. Bouchard	A. Bouchard	3:14

Side two
No.	Title	Writer(s)	Lead vocals	Length
1.	"R. U. Ready 2 Rock"	A. Bouchard, Sandy Pearlman	Bloom	3:45
2.	"Celestial the Queen"	Joe Bouchard, Helen Wheels	J. Bouchard	3:24
3.	"Goin' Through the Motions"	Bloom, Ian Hunter	Bloom	3:12
4.	"I Love the Night"	Roeser	Roeser	4:23
5.	"Nosferatu"	J. Bouchard, Wheels	J. Bouchard	5:23

2007 CD reissue bonus tracks
No.	Title	Writer(s)	Lead vocals	Length
11.	"Night Flyer"	Roeser	Roeser	3:48
12.	"Dial M for Murder"	A. Bouchard	Bloom	3:11
13.	"Please Hold"	A. Lanier	Lanier	2:47
14.	"Be My Baby" (The Ronettes cover)	Jeff Barry, Ellie Greenwich, Phil Spector	Bloom	3:01
Total length:				53:16

== Personnel ==
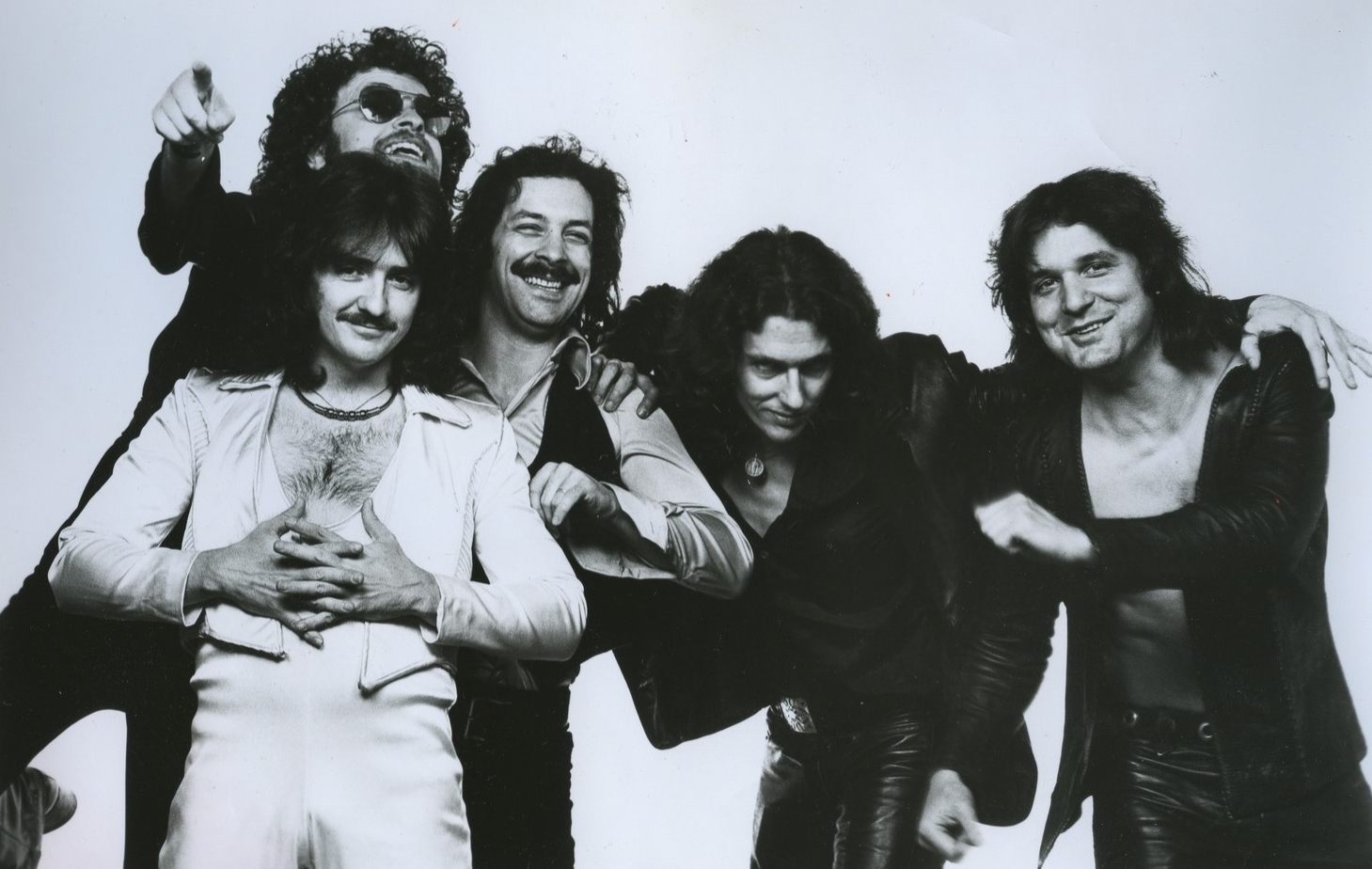
Blue Öyster Cult in 1977: (left to right) Roeser (in white); behind him Bloom (sunglasses); then Albert Bouchard, Lanier, Joe Bouchard

Blue Öyster Cult

- Eric Bloom – guitar, vocals
- Donald "Buck Dharma" Roeser – lead guitar, vocals
- Allen Lanier – keyboards, guitar
- Joe Bouchard – bass, vocals, guitar
- Albert Bouchard – drums, vocals, harmonica

Additional musicians

- Newark Boys Chorus – vocals on "Golden Age of Leather"

Production

- Murray Krugman, Sandy Pearlman, David Lucas – producers
- Shelly Yakus – engineer, mixing
- John Jansen, Corky Stasiak, Thom Panunzio, Andy Abrams – engineers
- Gray Russell, Dave Thoener, Jay Krugman, Rod O’Brien, Sam Ginsberg – assistant engineers
- Joe Brescio – mastering
- Roni Hoffman – design
- Eric Meola – photos
- David Infante – laser effects and photo assistance

== Charts ==
Chart (1977–78)	Peak position
Canada Top Albums/CDs (RPM)	58
French Albums (SNEP)	28
Swedish Albums (Sverigetopplistan)	47
UK Albums (Official Charts)	60
US Billboard 200	43

== Certifications ==
Region	Certification	Certified units/sales
United States (RIAA)	Gold	500,000^{^}
^{^} Shipments figures based on certification alone.
