= Agents of Fortune =

Studio album by Blue Öyster Cult
- Released: May 21, 1976
- Recorded: 1975–1976
- Studio: The Record Plant (New York City)
- Genres: Hard rock; occult rock; heavy metal
- Length: 36:35
- Label: Columbia
- Producers: Murray Krugman; Sandy Pearlman; David Lucas

Blue Öyster Cult chronology
On Your Feet or on Your Knees (1975)	Agents of Fortune (1976)	Spectres (1977)

Singles from Agents of Fortune
- 1. "(Don't Fear) The Reaper" Released: July 1976; 2. "This Ain't the Summer of Love" Released: June 1977 (US)

Agents of Fortune is the fourth studio album by American rock band Blue Öyster Cult, released on May 21, 1976, by Columbia Records.

The Platinum-selling album peaked at No. 29 on the US Billboard 200 chart, while the single "(Don't Fear) The Reaper" peaked at No. 12 on the Billboard Hot 100 singles chart, making it BÖC's biggest hit. The band became a bigger concert attraction after the release of the album, in part due to extensive airplay of "(Don't Fear) The Reaper", to this day a staple of rock-station playlists.

This is the only album in the group's discography to have at least one lead vocal performance by each original band member. It is their only album not to include any songs credited to Eric Bloom. However, the 2020 live release 40th Anniversary: Agents of Fortune Live 2016 adds Bloom's name to the authorship credits for "E.T.I. (Extra Terrestrial Intelligence)."

== Album cover ==
The album cover (created by artist Lynn Curlee) depicts Belgian magician Servais Le Roy performing a magic trick with four tarot cards — The Empress, The Emperor, The Sun and Death from the Thoth Tarot deck. The reverse shows a pyramid topped with the planet Saturn.

== Critical reception ==
Professional ratings
Review scores
Source	Rating
AllMusic	4.5/5 stars
The Collector's Guide to Heavy Metal	10/10
The Encyclopedia of Popular Music	4/5 stars
The Great Rock Discography	8/10
Mojo	5/5 stars
MusicHound Rock	5/5 stars
Music Story	4/5 stars
The Rolling Stone Album Guide	4/5 stars
Tom Hull – on the Web	A
The Village Voice	B+

Rolling Stone wrote that "Agents of Fortune is a startlingly excellent album — startling because one does not expect Blue Öyster Cult to sound like this: loud but calm, manic but confident, melodic but rocking."

Cash Box said of the single "This Ain't the Summer of Love" that "growling guitars churn out this realistic message with brief and pointed expression" ... "a mood of evil created in a humorous fashion."

== Track listing ==
Side one
No.	Title	Writer(s)	Lead vocals	Length
1.	"This Ain't the Summer of Love"	Albert Bouchard, Murray Krugman, Don Waller	Eric Bloom	2:21
2.	"True Confessions"	Allen Lanier	Lanier	2:57
3.	"(Don't Fear) The Reaper"	Donald Roeser	Roeser	5:08
4.	"E.T.I. (Extra Terrestrial Intelligence)"	Bloom, Roeser, Sandy Pearlman	Bloom	3:43
5.	"The Revenge of Vera Gemini"	A. Bouchard, Patti Smith	A. Bouchard, Patti Smith	3:52

Side two
No.	Title	Writer(s)	Lead vocals	Length
1.	"Sinful Love"	A. Bouchard, Helen Wheels	A. Bouchard	3:29
2.	"Tattoo Vampire"	A. Bouchard, Helen Wheels	Bloom	2:41
3.	"Morning Final"	Joe Bouchard	J. Bouchard, Bloom (paperboy voice)	4:30
4.	"Tenderloin"	Lanier	Bloom	3:40
5.	"Debbie Denise"	A. Bouchard, Smith	A. Bouchard	4:13

2001 CD reissue bonus tracks
No.	Title	Writer(s)	Lead vocals	Length
11.	"Fire of Unknown Origin" (original version)	Bloom, A. Bouchard, J. Bouchard, Roeser, Smith	A. Bouchard	3:30
12.	"Sally" (demo version)	A. Bouchard	A. Bouchard	2:40
13.	"(Don't Fear) The Reaper" (demo version)	Roeser	Roeser	6:20
14.	"Dance the Night Away" (demo version)	Lanier, Jim Carroll	Lanier	2:37
Total length:				51:42

== Personnel ==
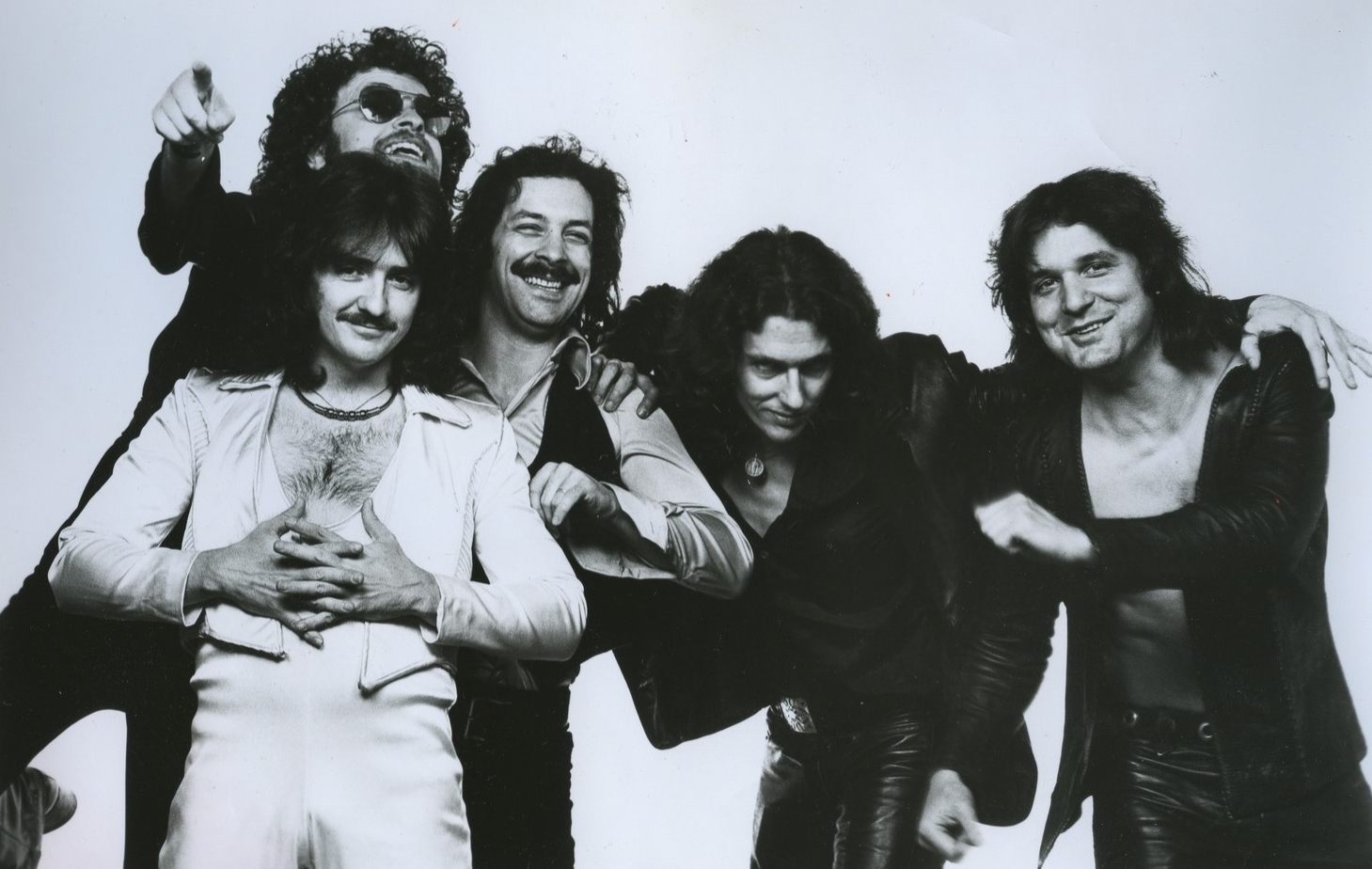
Blue Öyster Cult in 1977: (left to right) Roeser (in white); behind him Bloom (sunglasses); then Albert Bouchard, Lanier, Joe Bouchard

Band members

- Eric Bloom – guitar, vocals, keyboards, percussion
- Donald "Buck Dharma" Roeser – lead guitar, vocals, synthesizer, percussion
- Allen Lanier – keyboards, rhythm guitar, bass on "Morning Final", vocals
- Joe Bouchard – bass, vocals, piano on "Morning Final"
- Albert Bouchard – drums, percussion, acoustic guitar, vocals, harmonica

Additional musicians

- Patti Smith – vocals on "The Revenge of Vera Gemini"
- Randy Brecker – horns
- Michael Brecker – horns
- David Lucas – vocals, keyboards, percussion
- The cowbell on "(Don't Fear) The Reaper" may have been played by Albert Bouchard, David Lucas, or Eric Bloom.

Production

- David Lucas, Murray Krugman, Sandy Pearlman – producers
- Shelly Yakus, Andy Abrams – engineers
- Tony Stevens – mastering
- John Berg, Andy Engel – design
- Lynn Curlee – paintings

== Charts ==
Chart (1976)	Peak position
Australian Albums (Kent Music Report)	53
Canada Top Albums/CDs (RPM)	28
Finnish Albums (The Official Finnish Charts)	18
Swedish Albums (Sverigetopplistan)	10
UK Albums (Official Charts)	26
US Billboard 200	29

== Certifications ==
Region	Certification	Certified units/sales
Canada (Music Canada)	Gold	50,000^{^}
United States (RIAA)	Platinum	1,000,000^{^}
^{^} Shipments figures based on certification alone.

== Accolades ==
Publication	Country	Accolade	Year	Rank
The Village Voice	US	The 1976 Pazz & Jop Critics Poll	1976	10
NME	UK	Albums of the Year	1976	6
Dave Marsh & Kevin Stein	US	The Best of the Album Chartmakers by Year: 1976	1981	12
Kerrang!	UK	The 100 Greatest Heavy Metal Albums of All Time	1989	62
Q	UK	The Greatest Classic Rock Albums Ever!	2004	No order
