= Don Waller =

American journalist

Don Waller (September 1, 1951 – November 17, 2016) was a music journalist, publisher and rock vocalist. He co-published the Los Angeles music magazine Back Door Man, wrote freelance articles for Radio & Records, Mojo, Billboard and the Los Angeles Times, authored liner notes, and fronted the proto-punk rock band the Imperial Dogs. In 1986 he published a history of Motown Records titled The Motown Story.
