= David Lucas (composer) =

American rock and roll composer

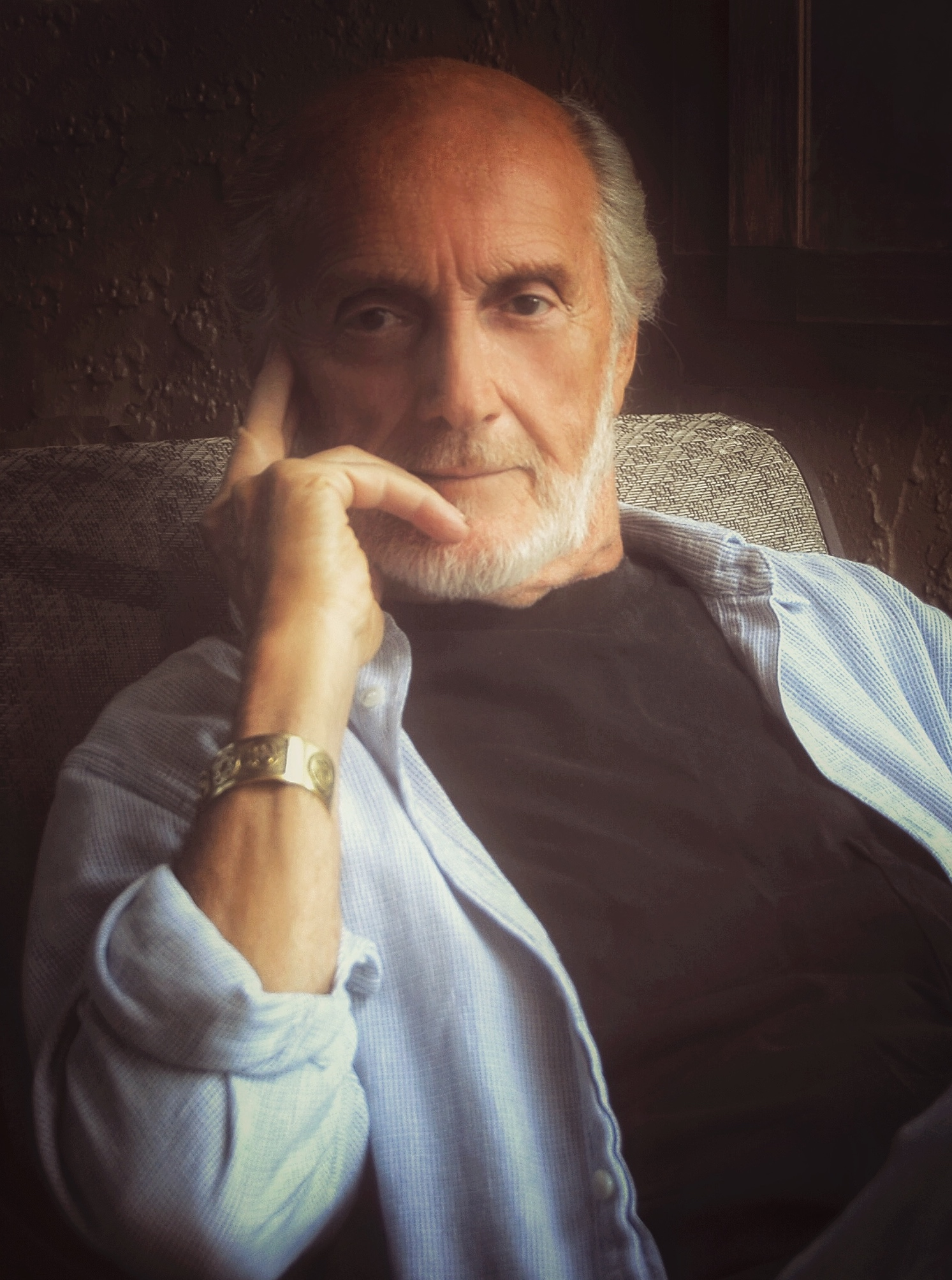
- Lucas in 2015

Background information
- Born: David Helfman; April 21, 1937 (age 89); Buffalo, New York, U.S.
- Genres: Rock and roll
- Occupations: Composer, singer, and producer
- Years active: 1941–present
- Website: davidlucasmusic.com

David Lucas (born David Helfman; April 21, 1937) is an American rock and roll composer, singer, and music producer. He has written thousands of commercial jingles, such as AT&T's "Reach Out and Touch Someone." In 1981, he received a Clio Award for composing the music to Pepsi's "Catch That Pepsi Spirit." As a record producer, he worked with many new artists such as Blue Öyster Cult. On the 1976 Blue Öyster Cult song "(Don't Fear) The Reaper" which he co-produced, Lucas sang backup vocals and came up with the idea for using a cowbell, parodied by Christopher Walken in the "More cowbell" skit on Saturday Night Live. In June 2011, Lucas was inducted into Buffalo's Music Hall of Fame.

== Biography ==
=== Early years (1940s–1960s) ===
Lucas was born David Helfman on April 21, 1937, in Buffalo, New York. By the age of four, he was singing with his parents in the Buffalo area, both at venues and on local radio. He briefly attended Bennett High School in Buffalo, where he sang in the choir, and then in 1951 transferred to Miami Beach Senior High School, graduating in 1955.

At the age of nineteen, Lucas started promoting records, choosing artists such as the young Paul Anka, Frankie Avalon, Sam Cooke, and The Everly Brothers, and encouraging local DJs to play their music. He was the top record promotion man in the northeastern United States until he was drafted into the United States Army, after which he moved to Miami Beach, where he was a social director and performer at the Attache Hotel. He made ends meet by selling vacuum cleaners during the day, and attending night school to learn about mutual funds. While in Miami, he met jazz drummer and bandleader Buddy Rich, and joined him for a world tour, after which Lucas moved to Los Angeles, where he worked as a songwriter and producer. In Las Vegas, he sang at the Sahara Hotel, where he was noticed by popular singer Doris Day, who was impressed, and signed Lucas to her record label, Arwin Records. Lucas then recorded "So Until I See You", a song by composer Al Lerner which became the closing theme for Jack Paar's The Tonight Show.

Lucas then moved to New York City where he took various odd jobs, including becoming a sound engineer for his cousin, jazz musician and writer Don Elliott. He worked with artists such as Laura Nyro, Ravi Shankar (produced by Timothy Leary), Tim Rose, Cass Elliot, Janis Ian, Jimmy Smith, Bill Evans, Roger Kellaway, Mel Tormé, and Terry Gibbs. In 1964 he joined a quintet formed by Dave Lambert, "Lambert and Co." This quintet, though it never recorded any albums, was notable because it became the subject of a 15-minute documentary by D. A. Pennebaker (later famous for working with Bob Dylan), called Audition at RCA. The scenes in the documentary were some of the last images recorded of Lambert, who, in 1966, was killed in an auto accident.

=== Jingle writer (1960s–1990s) ===
In the late 1960s, Lucas began writing his own commercial jingle melodies, such as Macleans Toothpaste. He eventually passed off his engineer job to Jay Messina, and opened his own company, David Lucas Associates, to write jingles full-time. In 1969, Quincy Jones introduced Lucas to Cy Coleman, who signed him to Coleman's Notable Music Publishing Company.

Along with writing jingles, Lucas continued with other projects as well. He was hired by Ahmet Ertegun as musical director for the first rock and roll musical, Tom Sankey's The Golden Screw, which played at the Provincetown Playhouse and won the 1967 Obie Award for Sankey's concept, writing, and performing. Lucas worked with a young tape dubber from Gotham Studios Wendy Carlos, who had an early Moog synthesizer to compose music for William Claxton's film Basic Black, a work that is credited as the first "fashion video" and is in the collection of the Museum of Modern Art in New York. He produced the first recordings of the blues band Raven, enabling them to secure a contract with Columbia Records. He composed the songs "Tell Me a Story" and "Blood" for The Magic Garden of Stanley Sweetheart (the first movie by actor Don Johnson) and also composed the theme music for the 1970s children's series, Jabberwocky, a show which remained in syndication for decades.

In 1973, Lucas formed a new partnership with Tom McFaul, and they founded their own studio. Situated in an old spice warehouse, they called it the Warehouse Recording Studio, and it hosted such artists as Paul McCartney and Charlie Brown. They employed a dozen people, and Lucas composed and produced thousands of jingles for many national brands, and McFaul created the "Meow" theme for Meow Mix. Notable jingles Lucas wrote included AT&T's "Reach Out and Touch Someone"; Pepsi's "Catch That Pepsi Spirit" and "Pepsi's got your taste for life"; "You look like you just heard from Dean Witter"; Maxwell House "Coffee Made Your Way"; Coca-Cola's "You Can't Beat The Feeling" (co-written with Jayne Critelli); "Give Your Cold To Contac"; "G.E. We Bring Good Things To Life"; "Lipton puts Summer on Ice"; and a jingle for Mercury Cougar. In 1979, New York Magazine referred to Lucas and McFaul as "Jingle Giants", two out of a handful of jingle writers, saying, "Two out of three major commercial jingles are written by the elite group."

=== Blue Öyster Cult (1970s) ===
In 1971, Lucas produced a four-song demo for the band Stalk-Forrest, which led to them being signed by Columbia's Clive Davis as Blue Öyster Cult. Lucas co-produced their first album at his Warehouse studio, and co-producer their 1976 album Agents of Fortune, including the song, "Don't Fear the Reaper". "Reaper" became a huge hit, and is listed at number 405 on Rolling Stone's list of the top 500 songs of all time. In it, Lucas sang background vocals and came up with the idea of playing the cowbell, which was parodied by Christopher Walken's producer character in the Saturday Night Live "More cowbell" comedy sketch on April 8, 2000. In 1977 Lucas co-produced Spectres which included the hit "Godzilla".

=== Current projects (1990s–present) ===
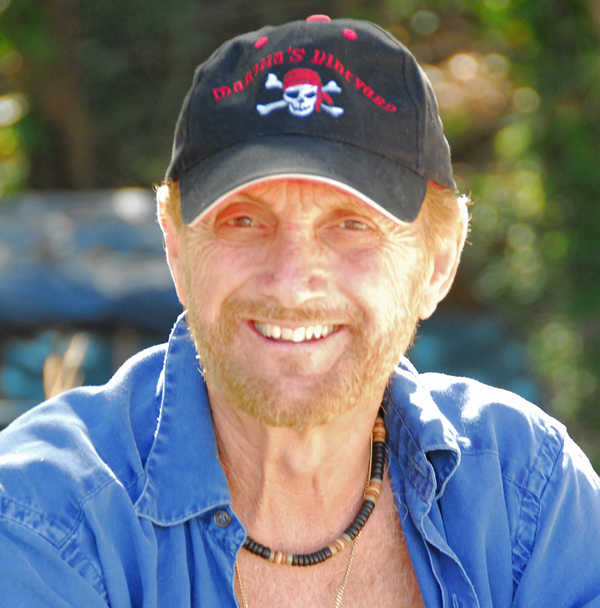
David Lucas, 2008

In 1998, Lucas sold The Warehouse, which was subsequently sold to Wyclef Jean. Lucas moved back to Miami where he built a studio and is continuing to write songs and jingles.

In 2010, Lucas wrote the song "Inside my Heart", which was sung by actress Kyra Sedgwick for The Miracle Project of Hollywood to benefit autism.

Also an avid sailor, Lucas once had a yacht built by David Macfarlane, Alden Yachts, now the president of reliantyachts.com, Sisu was used in the company's advertisements. In 1985, Lucas refined a recipe of his grandfather's and developed a brand of cocktail mix, "Bob's No Problem, Bloody Mary maker". The brand launched nationally in 2010.

Lucas has four grown children. Lisa Lucas, an award-nominated child actress in the 1970s, played "Addie Mills" in several CBS holiday specials. Jason Lucas is a composer and producer in Nashville, Cristopher Lucas is a composer and performer in Idaho, and David Lucas's youngest daughter Lindsay Lucas is a singer and performer in Boston, who attended Berklee College of Music. He is also working on a musical with co-writer Jayne Critelli, a writer/singer from Lucas/McFaul in the 1980s.

According to his website, Lucas spends a great deal of time in Portland, Jamaica, sailing and working on environmental projects, such as trying to save Winifred Beach for the local people. He operated the Frenchman's Cove resort for several years in the 1990s. He also joined his friend, Frank Clark, in sustaining "Reach Falls" and continues to support the revival of Portland Parish.

== Awards ==
Lucas has won Clio Awards for his composing music for commercials for AT&T (1980, Best Television/Cinema), Pepsi Cola's "Catch that Pepsi Spirit" (1981, U.S. Radio, Clio Winner), and Coca-Cola's "Masquerade on Skis" (Television/Cinema, Special Citation, 1969). In 2010, Lucas was recognized at the 35th annual Friends of Old Time Radio Convention, with an award for his contributions to the Golden Age of Radio. In June 2011, Lucas was inducted into the Buffalo, New York Music Hall of Fame.
