= Buck Dharma =

American musician (born 1947)

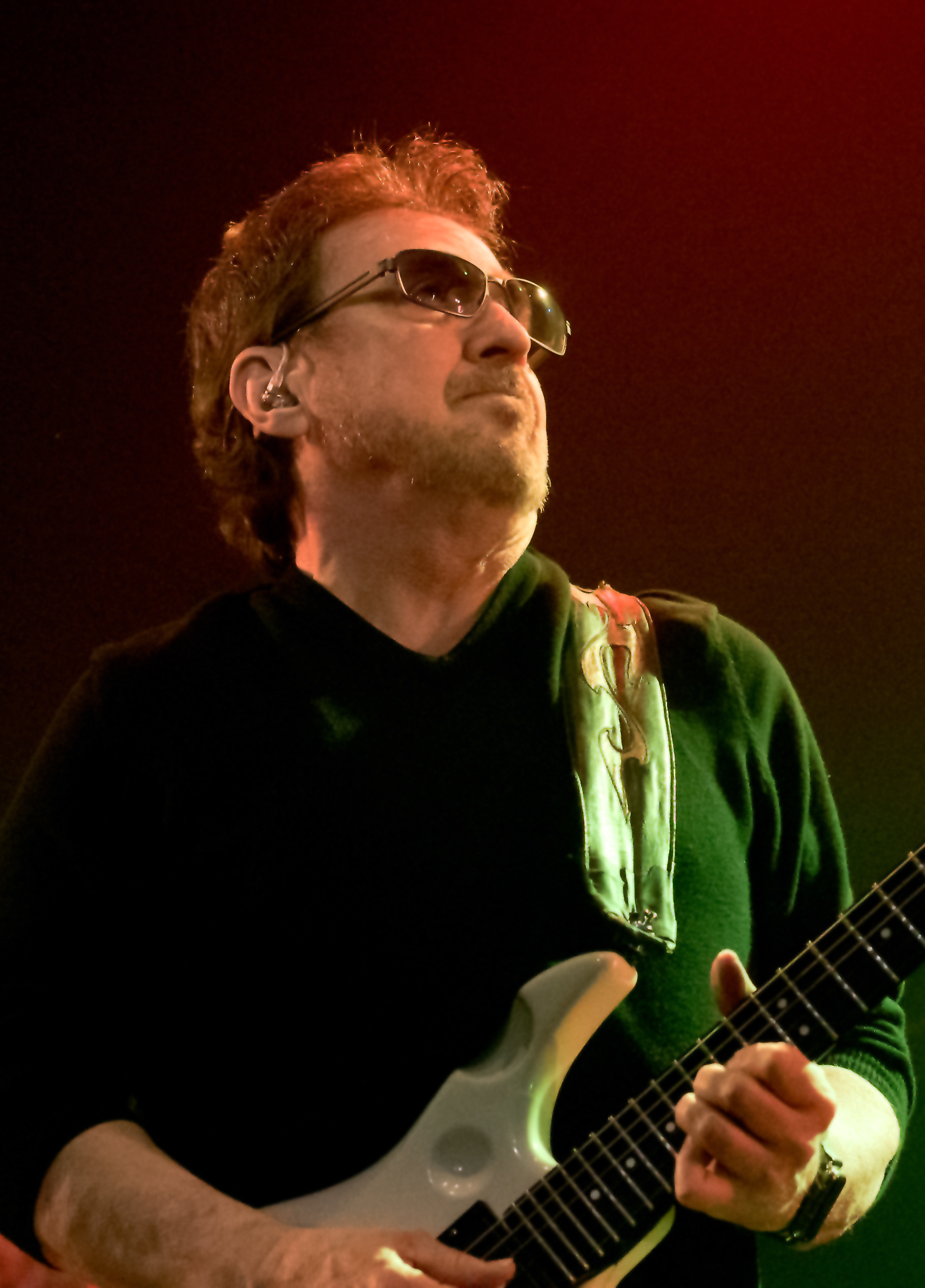
- Dharma performing in 2016

Background information
- Born: Donald Bruce Roeser; November 12, 1947 (age 78); New York City, U.S.
- Genres: Hard rock, heavy metal
- Occupations: Musician, songwriter
- Instruments: Guitar, vocals
- Years active: 1961–present
- Member of: Blue Öyster Cult
- Website: buckdharma.com

Donald Bruce Roeser (born November 12, 1947), known professionally as Buck Dharma, is an American guitarist, singer, and songwriter. He is the sole constant member of hard rock band Blue Öyster Cult since the group's formation in 1967. He wrote and sang vocals on several of the band's best-known hits, including "(Don't Fear) The Reaper", "Godzilla" and "Burnin' for You".

== Early life ==
Roeser was born in Queens, New York City. His father was an accomplished jazz saxophonist, and Roeser spent a lot of time listening to jazz music as a result. Because of this, Roeser developed an interest in the melodic arts at an early age, even playing the accordion for a brief time.

Roeser was influenced greatly by the British Invasion of 1964, and decided to pursue rock-and-roll music. He first started out playing the drums, but had to stop temporarily after breaking his wrist playing basketball. While recovering, Roeser learned to play guitar, and found he enjoyed it more than the drums.

== Career ==
=== Early career: 1961–1967 ===
During his high-school years at Smithtown Central High School, Roeser played guitar in various cover bands. At this time, he started to develop his own signature sound by imitating his favorite guitarists and combining their sounds with his own style. Roeser attended Clarkson University (then Clarkson College) in New York, and joined a band that included later bandmate Albert Bouchard. The two played together on and off during the rest of their college career. At the end, both musicians abandoned potential degrees (Roeser's in chemical engineering), and decided to pursue music full-time. They moved into a band house near Stony Brook University, where Roeser was a part-time student, and started their careers.

=== Soft White Underbelly: 1967–1971 ===
Roeser, Lanier, Bouchard and Andrew Winters formed the band Soft White Underbelly in 1967. Members included singer Les Braunstein and former music critic Sandy Pearlman (their producer). Roeser was enrolled in a communications course, but quit after Soft White Underbelly was formed because he wanted to "stop wasting [his] parents’ tuition money".

In 1968, they were signed by Elektra Records after the company's president Jac Holzman saw them perform. The band dropped Braunstein and added new singer Eric Bloom to their lineup, changing their name to "Stalk-Forrest Group" after a bad gig in 1970. Elektra dropped the band because of problems with the personnel, and the album was shelved (it was eventually released in 2001 under the name St. Cecilia: The Elektra Recordings).

=== Blue Öyster Cult: 1971–present ===
Roeser, along with Bouchard, Lanier, Pearlman, Bloom, and new member bassist Joe Bouchard (younger brother of Albert Bouchard) reformed with the name Blue Öyster Cult. They signed with Columbia Records in 1971, and released four albums between 1972 and 1975. By Blue Öyster Cult's fifth album Agents of Fortune in 1976, Roeser proved himself as a songwriter and vocalist with the band's signature song "(Don't Fear) The Reaper". As a result, Roeser's songwriting and vocals were more prevalent on the follow-up albums Spectres, Mirrors, Cultosaurus Erectus and Fire of Unknown Origin. Most significantly, he penned and sang the hits "Godzilla" and "Burnin' for You".

In 1982, Roeser recorded and released Flat Out, his first and only solo album to date. The tracks were all composed by Roeser (some co-written with Richard Meltzer, Neal Smith and Roeser's wife Sandy), with the exception of "Come Softly to Me", a song originally recorded by the Fleetwoods. The songs on the album were ones Roeser wanted to record with BÖC, but were perceived as too poppy by the other members of the band. Singles from the album were "Born to Rock" and "Your Loving Heart", both of which had music videos made but neither song charted. The video for the former was part of an MTV promo along with Blotto's "Metalhead" clip, in which Buck made a cameo appearance, as well as playing guitar on the song.

Roeser and Blue Öyster Cult subsequently recorded several more albums that flopped commercially, but contained several of Roeser's compositions and many tracks with him on lead vocals. The band's commercial struggles, along with the loss of original members Albert Bouchard (1981) and Allen Lanier (1985), prompted Blue Öyster Cult to break up in mid 1986.

In 1985, Roeser and Bloom participated in Hear 'n Aid, a project created by Ronnie James Dio to raise money for famine relief in Africa. It included many famous heavy metal musicians. Hear 'n Aid recorded the song "Stars", which includes a guitar solo by Roeser. Hear 'n Aid also released a compilation album which included "Stars", as well as live outtakes from the participating artists.

In 1988 Blue Öyster Cult released Imaginos, which was recorded between 1982 and 1988. The record was originally planned to be a concept album by former drummer Albert Bouchard, based on Sandy Pearlman's poetry. At the insistence of Columbia Records, it was released under the band's name. Despite largely positive reviews, the album did not do well commercially, and the band was dropped by Columbia. This was the last album featuring all the original members, as the Bouchards left at the end of production.

In 1988, Roeser formed the Red and the Black with Jon Rogers (bass and vocals) and Ron Riddle (drums and vocals). The band recorded demos but was not signed by a record company and never released an album. As a result, the band split quickly. In 1989, Roeser contributed the instrumental "Gamera is Missing" to the album Guitar's Practicing Musicians Volume 3 (later included on the CD re-release of Flat Out).

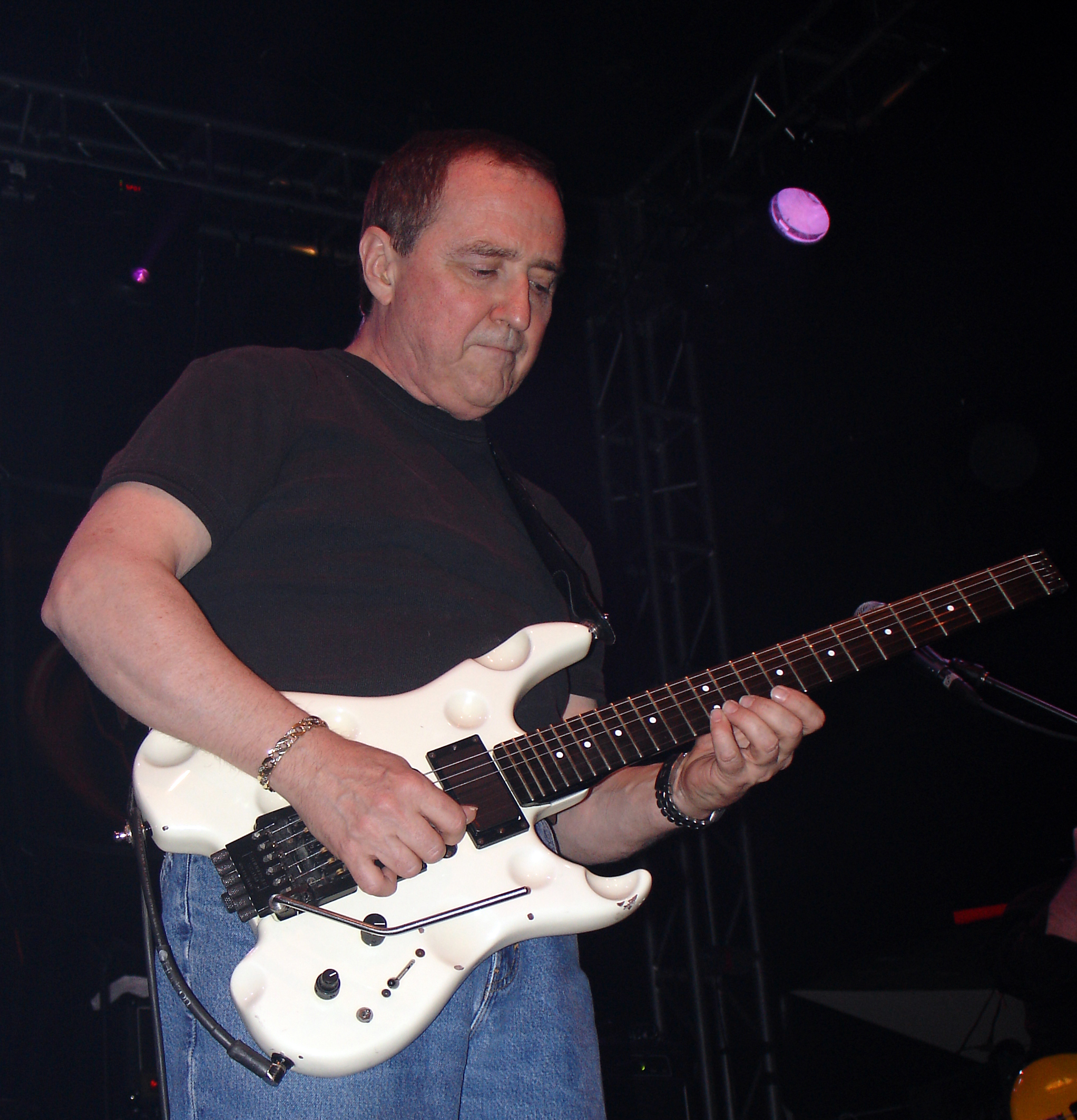
Dharma in 2006

After releasing Imaginos, Roeser, Bloom and Lanier continued to tour as Blue Öyster Cult, with various musicians on bass and drums. In 1992, the band wrote the score for Bad Channels and composed two original songs for its soundtrack. In 1994, Blue Öyster Cult released Cult Classic, an album containing remakes of their greatest hits.

In the late 1990s, Blue Öyster Cult signed with Sanctuary Records, and released two studio albums and one live album between 1998 and 2002, after which the band was dropped by the label. Roeser continues to tour extensively with the band, and in December 2012 reunited for a final time with all of the original members for the band's 40th Anniversary Concert.

On January 1, 2015, Roeser released "Fight", an original song, on his SoundCloud account. It is his first new material since 2001. The song was later re-recorded with Blue Öyster Cult, appearing on their fifteenth album The Symbol Remains (2020).

In 1982, Roeser appeared on the song "Metalhead" by the comedy-rock group Blotto and appears in the song's video, watching television.

In 2013 Roeser played on, co-produced and mixed two songs on The Lizardz - Eyeblinder release contributing to Back From Milwaukee and the title track, Eyeblinder.

From 2018 to 2023, Roeser appeared on the opening song of the first three Spirits Burning & Michael Moorcock albums, which are musical adaptations of Moorcock's The Dancers At The End Of Time sequence.

In July 2024, Roeser released a video for a new song, "The End of Every Song" on Youtube.

In May 2026, Roeser received an honorary Doctorate from Five Towns College, in Dix Hills, NY.

== Personal life ==
In 2002, Roeser and his wife created "The Dharmas", a web series exclusively featured on Roeser's website. The web series is a comical, fictionalized view into the life and times of the Roeser family.

In 1996, Roeser heard about Ricky Browning, a 10-year-old fan of Roeser's "Godzilla" who was battling a brain tumor. Roeser organized a benefit concert to help with the family's medical costs. Roeser, his wife Sandy, drummer John Miceli and bassist Danny Miranda played the concert under the name "Buck Dharma Band". Roeser taped the concert and released a video of it, which includes the story of Browning. Browning eventually succumbed to his illness. The Roesers still have a close relationship with the Browning family.

== Equipment ==
Roeser uses the Gibson SG and numerous Steinberger models. One of his Steinberger guitars has a custom body made to look like Swiss cheese; Dharma calls this guitar his "Cheeseberger".

His other equipment use includes: a Giuliano Balestra Vulcan, a Fender Stratocaster, a St. Blues and custom models built by Rick Kresiak, Harper Guitars and Warren Guitars. Many of his guitars were made by White Plains-based custom guitar maker Giuliano.

In August 2015 Dharma became an endorser of Kiesel Guitars and played a headless Vader 6.

== Stage name ==
Roeser got the stage name "Buck Dharma" in the late 1960s. Manager Sandy Pearlman came up with the idea of creating eccentric stage names for Blue Öyster Cult's members. Every member rejected their new stage name except for Roeser, who liked the name and the idea of having an alternative persona.

== Discography ==
=== Studio albums ===
- Flat Out (1982)

=== Singles ===
- Born to Rock (1982)
- Your Loving Heart (1982)
- End of Every Song (2024)
