= Sandy Pearlman =

American music producer (1943–2016)

- Born: Samuel Clarke Pearlman; August 5, 1943; Rockaway, Queens, New York, U.S.
- Died: July 26, 2016 (aged 72) Novato, California, U.S.
- Occupations: Music producer; talent manager; record executive
- Years active: 1967–2016

Samuel Clarke "Sandy" Pearlman (August 5, 1943 – July 26, 2016) was an American music producer, artist manager, music journalist and critic, professor, poet, songwriter, and record company executive. He was best known for founding, writing for, producing, or co-producing many LPs by Blue Öyster Cult, as well as producing notable albums by The Clash, The Dictators, Pavlov's Dog, and Dream Syndicate; he was also the founding Vice President of eMusic.com. He was the Schulich Distinguished Professor Chair at the Schulich School of Music at McGill University in Montreal, and from August 2014 held a Marshall McLuhan Centenary Fellowship at the Coach House Institute (CHI) of the University of Toronto Faculty of Information as part of the CHI's McLuhan Program in Culture and Technology.

== Early life and education ==
Pearlman was born in the Rockaway neighborhood of Queens, New York, the son of pharmacy operator Hyman Pearlman. He received a Bachelor of Arts from Stony Brook University in 1966, where he had been student president. He was awarded a Woodrow Wilson Fellowship in the History of Ideas, and completed graduate work at Brandeis University. He was also a New School Fellow in sociology and anthropology. As a university student, Pearlman wrote a series of poems called Imaginos, whose characters and lyrics would feature in his later career.

== Career ==
In 1967, Pearlman hand-picked musicians for a rock band to perform the lyrics that he was writing, based on his Imaginos poems. He dubbed the band "Soft White Underbelly" (from a World War II speech by Winston Churchill) and later changed their name to "Blue Öyster Cult". He managed the band (with Murray Krugman) from 1967 to 1995, and produced or co-produced 7 of their studio albums, and 4 of their live albums. Significantly, Pearlman was co-producer, with David Lucas and Murray Krugman, of BÖC's "(Don't Fear) The Reaper" in 1976. The song reached No. 12 on the Top 40 charts and has remained an FM radio staple since. On the Rolling Stone list of top 500 songs of all time, it is listed as No. 405.

In 1966, he was introduced to the founder of Crawdaddy! magazine, Paul Williams, by Playboy political analyst Michael Horowitz; by 1967 Pearlman had become one of the original rock music critics of the magazine along with Williams, Jon Landau and Richard Meltzer, with Horowitz later penning a cover profile of Jim Morrison for Crawdaddy! in April 1969.

Pearlman was considered an important figure in the development of both alternative and commercial American rock music, and for his intervention in British punk. He was drafted by record company CBS to produce Give 'Em Enough Rope, The Clash's second album, which gave the band their largest audience to date, and also produced many of the tracks that were compiled in "Black Market Clash". He was described as the "Hunter Thompson of rock, a gonzo producer of searing intellect and vast vision.", in the Billboard Producer Directory.

Pearlman also worked as a full-time artist manager, managing the careers of Blue Öyster Cult, Black Sabbath (1979–1983), Romeo Void, The Dictators, Shakin' Street, Aldo Nova and others. In the 1980s, he pioneered the mega-tour stadium format of several bands traveling together, sharing promotional costs and production and travel costs, a format persisting today with the Lollapalooza Festival, the Lilith Fair and related tour packages.

In 1983, Pearlman leased Studio C in San Francisco's The Automatt Studios from studio owner David Rubinson and dubbed it Time Enough World Enough Studios. After The Automatt closed in 1984, he leased Studio C at Hyde Street Studios from studio owner Dan Alexander. Pearlman ran a recording operation in Studio C as Alpha & Omega Studio from 1986 until 1991. He also used it for his own projects, including those on his short-lived MCA-distributed label Popular Metaphysics, and he also sub-leased it to other producers and artists.

In 1989 he took over as president of the alternative record company 415 Records and established a production and distribution deal for the label with MCA Records, before purchasing the company and changing the label's name to Popular Metaphysics.

The label was short lived, but it signed a few solid acts and released their records on the MCA label, including Love Club (1990), Manitoba's Wild Kingdom (1990), and World Entertainment War (1991). The 1991 edition of Mark Garvey's Songwriters' Market, published in 1990, carried a listing that read as follows: "*SANDY PEARLMAN, INC., 245 Hyde St., San Francisco CA 94102. (415)885-4999. A&R Director: Natasha V. Record producer, record company (Popular Metaphysics, formerly 415), recording studio (Alpha & Omega Recording, Hyde Street Studios)."

In the late 1990s, Pearlman served as the founding vice-president of e-music.com, a subscription store for download-to-own online music and audiobooks that is headquartered in New York City and now owned by Dimensional Associates. eMusic was one of the first sites to sell music in the MP3 format, beginning in 1998. As of September 2008, eMusic had over 400,000 subscribers. He also served as vice-president of media development for MoodLogic.com, the first on-line music recommendation engine, from 2000 to 2003.

In 2009, Sandy Pearlman was appointed as an at-large member of the National Recording Preservation Board (NRPB) of the Library of Congress.

Pearlman was the Schulich Distinguished Chair of music at McGill University in Montreal, specializing in the programs in music theory, sound recording and music technology; he later served as Centenary Fellow at the McLuhan Center for Culture and Technology at the University of Toronto, where he co-taught a course on Digital Media Distribution. Additionally, he was a visiting lecturer at Harvard University, Stanford University, University of California, Berkeley, University of California, Santa Cruz, and an invited speaker at the Mill Valley Film Festival, Future of Music Coalition, Canadian Music Week and SxSW Festivals. As a Professor and as a public speaker, Pearlman lectured on the architecture of the music industry, strategies for re-monetizing music downloads, and the history and future of music. He owned Alpha & Omega Recording, a 72-track analog recording facility in San Rafael, California. His production career was managed by Peter Shershin at Breathing Protection, Inc.

=== Awards ===
Pearlman was the recipient of 17 gold and platinum records.

== Death ==
Pearlman died on July 26, 2016, in Novato, California, from pneumonia due to stroke-related complications. He was 72.

== Production credits ==
- 1972 – Blue Öyster Cult – Blue Öyster Cult
- 1973 – Blue Öyster Cult – Tyranny and Mutation
- 1973 – The Mahavishnu Orchestra – Between Nothingness and Eternity
- 1974 – Blue Öyster Cult – Secret Treaties
- 1975 – Pavlov's Dog – Pampered Menial
- 1975 – Blue Öyster Cult – On Your Feet or on Your Knees
- 1975 – The Dictators – Go Girl Crazy!
- 1976 – Pavlov's Dog – At the Sound of the Bell
- 1976 – Blue Öyster Cult – Agents of Fortune
- 1977 – The Dictators – Manifest Destiny
- 1977 – Blue Öyster Cult – Spectres
- 1978 – The Dictators – Bloodbrothers
- 1978 – Blue Öyster Cult – Some Enchanted Evening
- 1978 – The Clash – Give 'Em Enough Rope
- 1980 – Shakin' Street – Shakin' Street
- 1984 – Dream Syndicate – Medicine Show
- 1985 – Blue Öyster Cult – Club Ninja
- 1988 – Blue Öyster Cult – Imaginos
- 1998 – Cosmic Free Way – Red Flowers
- 2001 - Jenifer McKitrick -Glow
