= Eric Bloom =

American singer, songwriter and musician (born 1944)

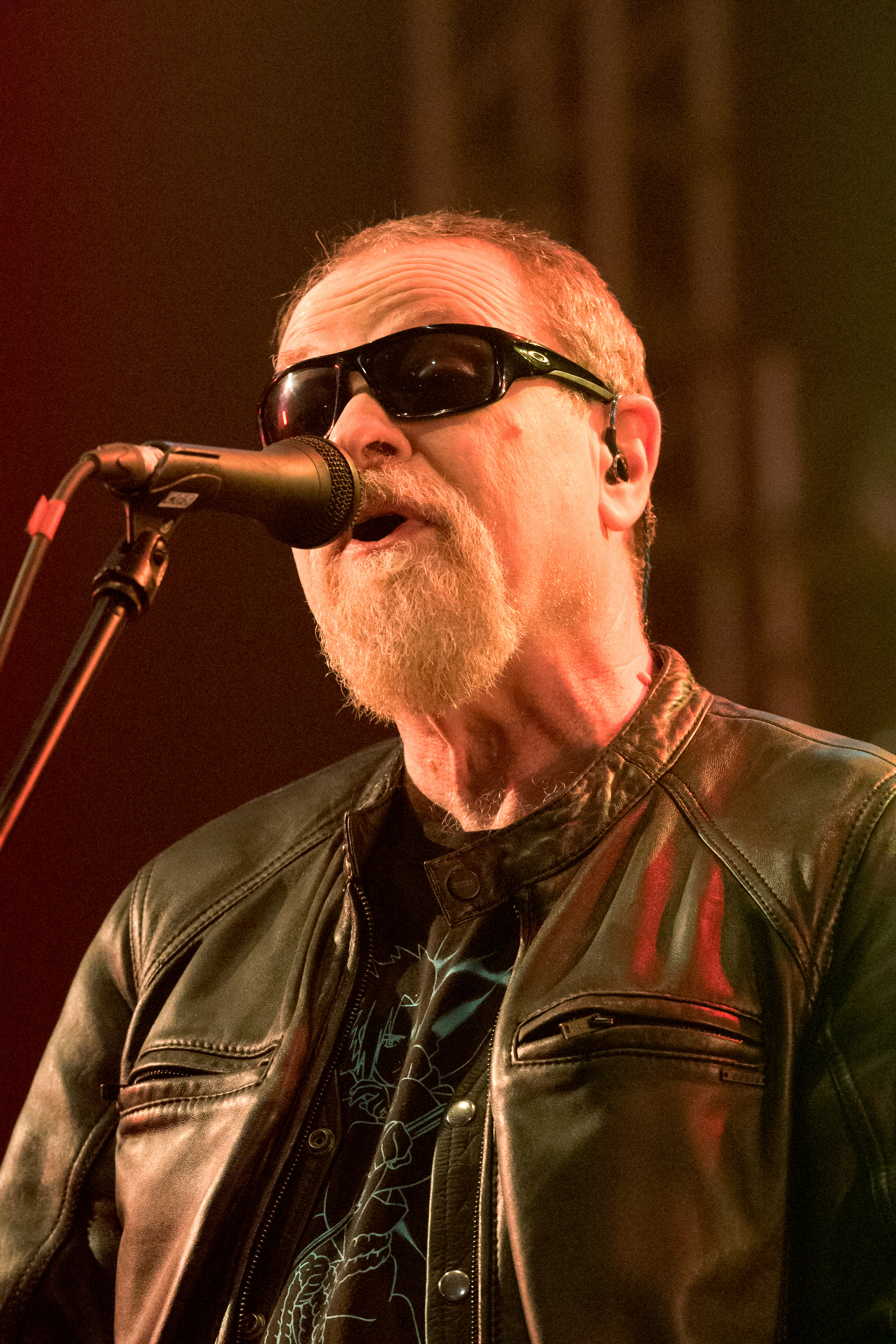
- Bloom in 2016

Background information
- Born: Eric Jay Bloom; December 1, 1944 (age 81); Brooklyn, New York City, U.S.
- Genres: Hard rock, heavy metal, psychedelic rock
- Occupations: Musician, singer, songwriter
- Instruments: Vocals, guitar, keyboards
- Years active: 1959–present
- Labels: Columbia, CMC
- Website: ericbloom.net

Eric Jay Bloom (born December 1, 1944) is an American musician, singer and songwriter. He is best known as the co-lead vocalist, guitar and keyboard/synthesizer player for the long-running band Blue Öyster Cult, with work on more than 20 albums. Much of his lyrical content relates to his lifelong interest in science fiction.

== Early life and education ==
A native New Yorker, Bloom was born in Brooklyn, the youngest of three children, and grew up in Queens. His mother was a housewife, active in local charities and family life. His father ran a picture frame and print company in Manhattan. Bloom is Jewish. Bloom attended JHS 216 (George J. Ryan Junior High School), and then moved on to Woodmere Academy and Cheshire Academy in Connecticut. It was there that he purchased his first guitar, a $52 Harmony full-bodied electric.

Bloom, known as "Manny" Bloom in college, attended Hobart College in Geneva, New York, studying modern languages.

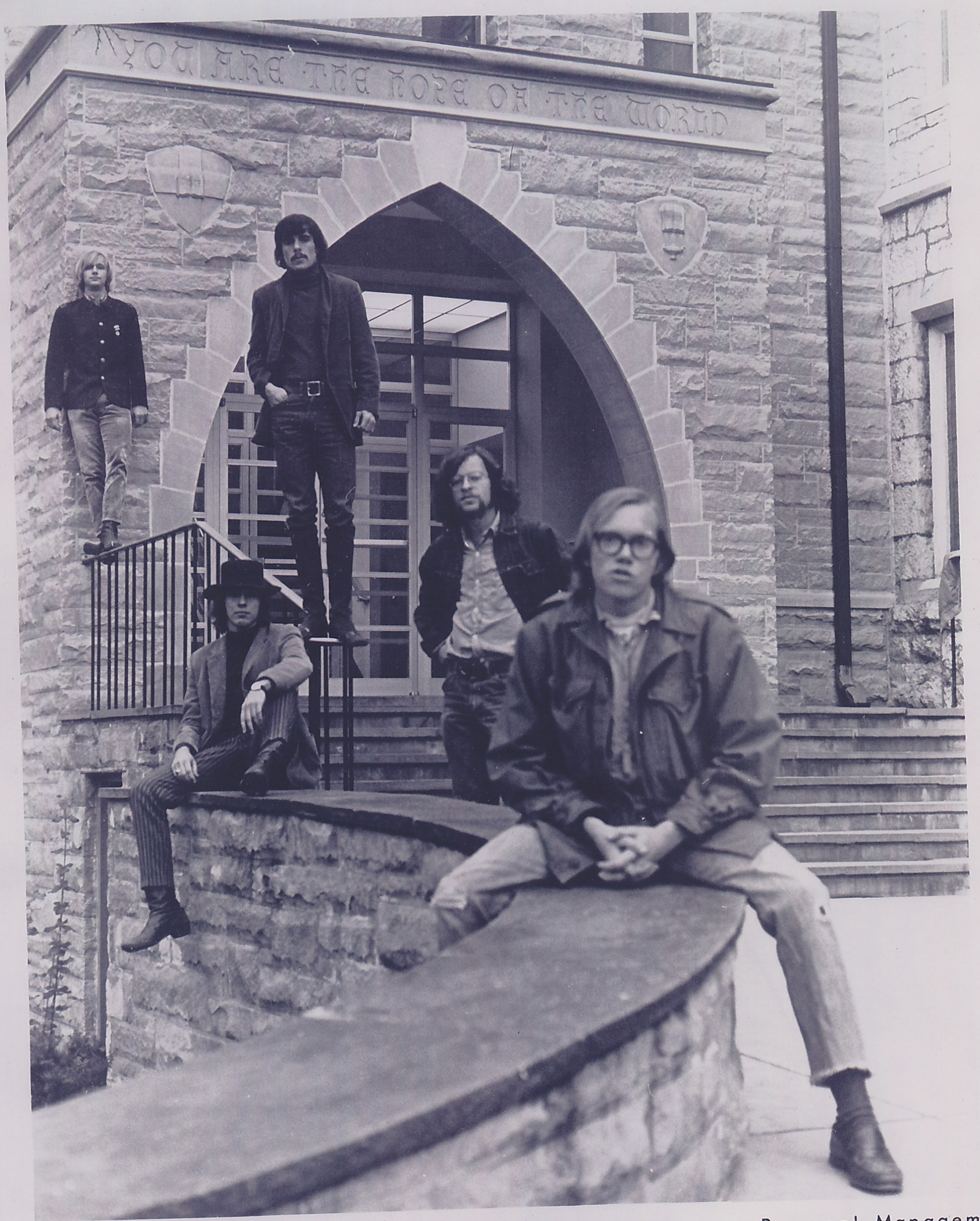
The group "Lost and Found", 1966. From left: Peter Haviland, Jeff Hayes, John Trivers, Bloom, and George Faust photographed at Hobart and William Smith Colleges.

== Career ==
=== Soft White Underbelly: 1968–1971 ===
Soft White Underbelly promo, December 1968

One day in late 1968 some members of the band Soft White Underbelly, Donald Roeser (later Buck Dharma), Allen Lanier and Andrew Winters, entered the music store where Bloom was working. One of them spotted a photo that Bloom had put up as a joke—he had placed an 8x10 glossy of his old band Lost and Found up on the wall with all the major bands such as the Rolling Stones and The Who. One of the SWU members recognized it because Les Braunstein, their lead singer, had also been a Hobart College alumnus, and had told his bandmates about the other college band. As Bloom talked with them about the photo, they struck up a friendship. Bloom ended up doing some sound engineering for them at the Electric Circus in Greenwich Village, and they mutually impressed each other enough that in November 1968, the band's manager, Sandy Pearlman, asked if Bloom would like to become their tour manager. Bloom moved into the group's house in Great Neck, New York, in December 1968.

=== Blue Öyster Cult: 1972–present ===
In April 1969, when lead singer Braunstein dropped out of the group, Bloom became the band's vocalist. The band went through several name changes, but in 1971 settled on Blue Öyster Cult. Their first album was released by Columbia Records in 1972.

In 1976, their platinum album Agents of Fortune with its hit "(Don't Fear) the Reaper" launched the band into international fame, though that particular song was sung and written by lead guitarist Buck Dharma. Both Creem readers and Rolling Stone critics voted "Don't Fear the Reaper" as the top single of the year.

Bloom bought his own house in Great Neck in 1976.

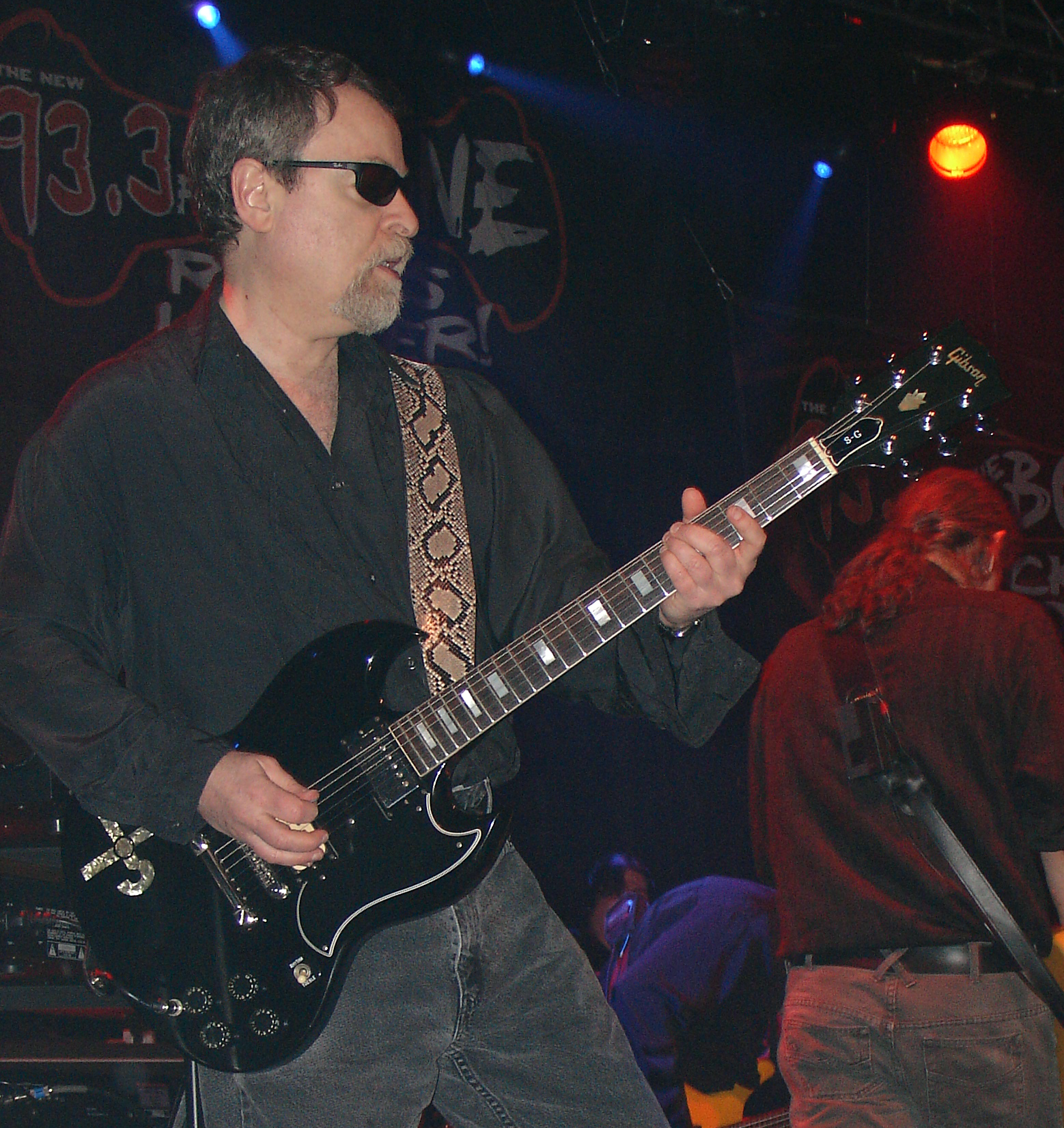
Bloom performing with Blue Öyster Cult

Bloom has been one of the longtime members of the band throughout the decades, along with original member Buck Dharma. Bloom is credited as playing "stun guitar" on some Blue Öyster Cult works, a term the band uses for the distortion sound of his rhythm guitar.

=== Outside work ===
Bloom is known for being an avid reader, especially science fiction and fantasy novels. He once sent a fan letter to English science-fiction author Michael Moorcock, and then collaborated with him on three songs. "Black Blade" was written from the point of view of Moorcock's Elric character, and the other two were "The Great Sun Jester" and "Veteran of the Psychic Wars", the latter of which was used in the original Heavy Metal movie.

Bloom also collaborated with author Eric Van Lustbader on the song "Shadow Warrior", and in 1998, 2001 and 2020 with cyberpunk author John Shirley on the Heaven Forbid, Curse of the Hidden Mirror and The Symbol Remains albums.

In 2006, Bloom began a partnership with artist Philippe Renaudin, to create and sell six elaborately painted custom-made guitars, each one of which interprets a different Blue Öyster Cult song, and each of which was played during BÖC performances.
