= Allen Lanier =

American musician (1946–2013)

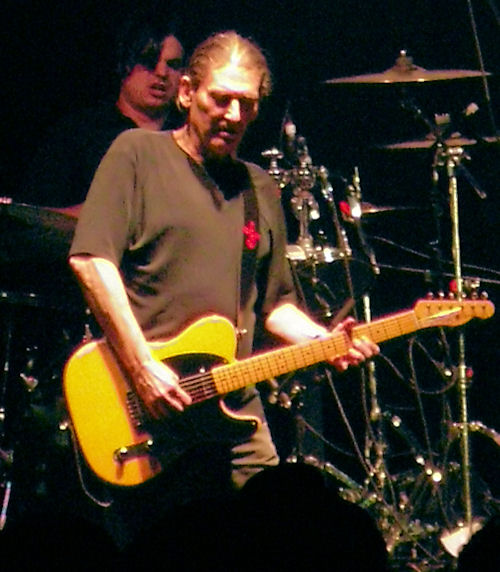
- Lanier performing in 2006

Background information
- Born: Allen Glover Lanier; June 25, 1946; Birmingham, Alabama, U.S.
- Died: August 14, 2013 (aged 67) New York City, U.S.
- Genres: Heavy metal; hard rock; psychedelic rock
- Occupations: Musician; songwriter
- Instruments: Keyboards; guitar; vocals
- Years active: 1961–2007; 2012
- Formerly of: Blue Öyster Cult

Allen Glover Lanier (/ləˈnɪər/; June 25, 1946 – August 14, 2013) was an American musician who played keyboards and guitar. He was an original member of Blue Öyster Cult.

== Early life and education ==
Lanier was born in Birmingham, Alabama and later relocated to Long Island, New York. Lanier attended film school.

== Career ==
=== Blue Öyster Cult ===
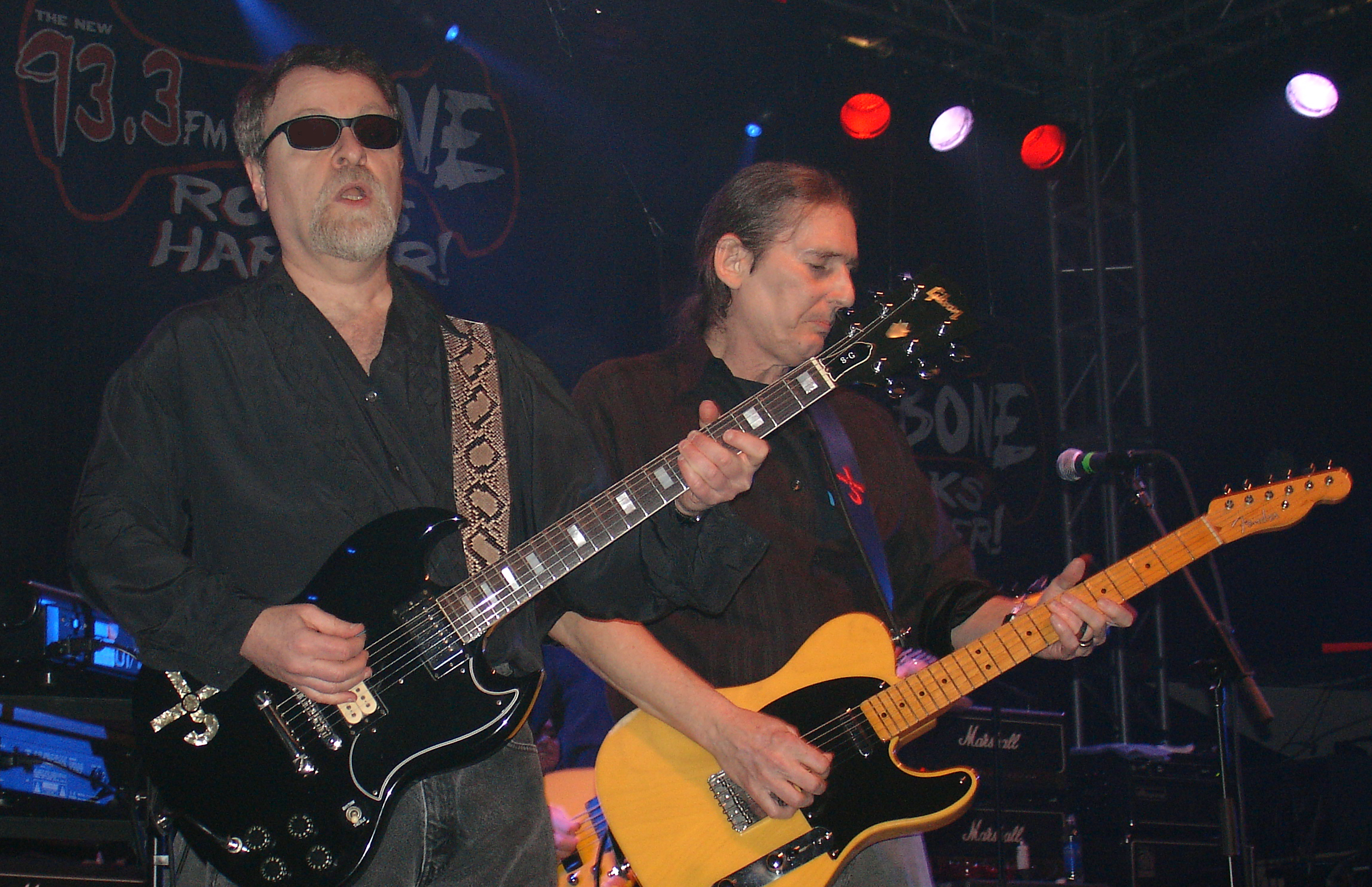
Lanier and Eric Bloom (left) performing in 2006

Lanier formed what would become Blue Öyster Cult in 1967. Lanier first performed with the band (then known as Soft White Underbelly) in 1967. He left the group in 1985, and was replaced by Tommy Zvoncheck (of Clarence Clemons and Public Image Ltd fame). Lanier returned to the band in 1987, touring constantly until the fall of 2006.

Lanier wrote several songs for Blue Öyster Cult albums, including "True Confessions", "Tenderloin", "Searchin' for Celine", "In Thee", and "Lonely Teardrops".

Without any official announcement from Blue Öyster Cult, the band's line-up photograph was updated to remove Lanier, and a brief mention on the page for Richie Castellano has the following to say: "Since the retirement of Allen Lanier, Richie has switched over to the guitars/keyboards position, both of which he's quite the master!". That would seem to indicate that Allen Lanier retired from both Blue Öyster Cult and music in 2007, having played his last concert with them in late 2006. He would rejoin them for their 40th anniversary concert in New York in November 2012, which proved to be his last appearance with the band.

== Other works ==
In addition to his work with Blue Öyster Cult, Lanier also contributed to music by Patti Smith, John Cale, Jim Carroll, the Dictators, The Clash, and others.

== Personal life ==
Lanier lived with Patti Smith in Manhattan for several years during the 1970s.

== Death ==
Lanier died in New York City on August 14, 2013, at the age of 67. Lanier's death was announced by Blue Öyster Cult. According to their official Facebook page, "Allen succumbed to complications from C.O.P.D." Lead singer Eric Bloom posted the following:

"My great friend Allen Lanier has passed. I'll miss the guy even though we hadn't spoken in a while. He was so talented as a musician and a thinker. He read voraciously, all kinds of things, especially comparative religion. We drove for years together, shared rooms in the early days. We partied, laughed, played. All BOC fans and band members will mourn his death. Ultimately smoking finally got to him. He had been hospitalized with C.O.P.D. It was Allen who heard some old college band tapes of mine and suggested I get a shot as the singer in 1968. A lot of great memories, more than 40 years' worth. Maybe he's playing a tune with Jim Carroll right now."

== Discography ==
For Allen Lanier’s releases with Blue Öyster Cult, see Blue Öyster Cult discography
