= Albert Bouchard =

American drummer

- Bouchard in 1977

Background information
- Born: May 24, 1947 (age 79); Watertown, New York, U.S.
- Genres: Heavy metal, hard rock, psychedelic rock
- Occupation: Musician
- Instruments: Drums, vocals, percussion, guitar, cowbell, some guzheng
- Member of: The Dictators
- Formerly of: Blue Öyster Cult

Albert Bouchard (/buˈʃɑːrd/; born May 24, 1947) is an American musician. He is a founding member and one of the first and most prominent drummers of the hard rock band Blue Öyster Cult and current drummer of The Dictators. He is the older brother of former Blue Öyster Cult bassist Joe Bouchard.

== Early years ==
Bouchard was born to Robert Bouchard and Francis Ryan. He was born in Watertown, New York, and grew up in Clayton, New York. He is the older brother of BÖC member Joe Bouchard by 18 months.

== Career ==
=== Blue Öyster Cult ===
To read more on Bouchard’s career in Blue Öyster Cult, see Blue Öyster Cult

He was a founding member of the hard rock band Blue Öyster Cult and a driving force through the band's first decade.

In 1981, Bouchard left Blue Öyster Cult. He began to work on an intended solo album that would become the album Imaginos (1988) released under the BÖC name.

=== Later works ===
He has also played on records for Mike Watt (a version of BÖC's "Dominance and Submission" for the flip side of Watt's 1995 single "E Ticket Ride"), and Richie Stotts (Plasmatics), Gumball and Fabienne Shine. Bouchard has produced records for many other musicians, including Maria Excommunikata, Heads Up! and David Roter.

Until 2006, Bouchard's main musical project had been Brain Surgeons, with whom he released several CDs on his own Cellsum Records label. Cellsum grew to host a number of other artists, including Les Vegas, The X Brothers, David Roter and Helen Wheels. In 2007, Bouchard formed Ünderbelly with original Soft White Underbelly singer Les Braunstein, Brain Surgeons bassist David Hirschberg, and guitarist Adrian Romero. They were featured on the 2008 Motörhead tribute CD Sheep in Wolves' Clothing, and released the songs "Critical Mass" and "Astronomy" in 2011.

In 2008, Bouchard formed the band 'Blue Coupe' with his brother Joe and original Alice Cooper bassist Dennis Dunaway. Originally an Alice Cooper/Blue Öyster Cult cover act, 'Blue Coupe' has released three albums of original material: Tornado on the Tracks in 2010, Million Miles More in 2013, and Eleven Even in 2019. In 2014, Bouchard released his first solo record, Incantation, which was followed in 2017 by a second album, Surrealist.

=== Recent years ===
Bouchard released a new album in November 2020, titled Re Imaginos, a mostly acoustic version of the album Imaginos, and released a follow-up Imaginos 2: Bombs Over Germany (Minus Zero And Counting) in 2021. In 2023, Bouchard released the third and final album of his Imaginos trilogy, The Mutant Reformation.

Bouchard joined the reunited proto-punk band The Dictators, featuring original members Ross the Boss and Andy Shernoff, along with new lead vocalist and Ozzy's Boneyard host Keith Roth. The band released their first album in 23 years, The Dictators, on September 6, 2024.
