= Workshop of the Telescopes =

- Cover art by Greg Scott

Greatest hits album by Blue Öyster Cult
- Released: September 26, 1995 (US)
- Genres: Hard rock; heavy metal
- Length: 148:56
- Labels: Columbia; Sony

Blue Öyster Cult chronology
Cult Classic (1994)	Workshop of the Telescopes (1995)	Heaven Forbid (1998)

Professional ratings
Review scores
Source	Rating
Allmusic	4.5/5 stars

Workshop of the Telescopes is a two-disc compilation album by the American rock band Blue Öyster Cult, released by Sony Music/Columbia Entertainment in 1995. All of the material on this album was recorded prior to the Imaginos sessions; some of it was previously only available on promo discs (marked (*)), and a few others were previously unavailable on CD (marked (+)).

The CD comes with an explanatory booklet outlining the development of Blue Öyster Cult and their rise to fame throughout the 1970s and 1980s.

The album served as a basis of the double-disc reissue of The Essential Blue Öyster Cult in 2012, sharing 21 tracks, substituting some tracks with their live counterparts.

== Track listing ==
=== Disc one ===
1. "Cities on Flame with Rock and Roll" – 4:03
2. "Transmaniacon MC" – 3:20
3. "Before the Kiss, a Redcap" – 4:58
4. "Stairway to the Stars" – 3:43
5. "Buck's Boogie (Live)" – 5:17
6. "Workshop of the Telescopes (Live)" (*) – 3:46
7. "The Red and the Black (Live)" (*) – 4:35
8. "7 Screaming Diz-Busters" – 7:00
9. "Career of Evil" – 4:07
10. "Flaming Telepaths" – 5:23
11. "Astronomy" – 6:15
12. "Subhuman (Live)" – 7:30
13. "Harvester of Eyes (Live)" – 5:00
14. "ME 262 (Live)" – 8:17
15. "Born to Be Wild" (+) – 3:38 (Steppenwolf cover)

=== Disc two ===
1. "Don't Fear the Reaper" – 5:08
2. "This Ain't the Summer of Love" – 2:21
3. "E.T.I. (Extra Terrestrial Intelligence)" – 3:42
4. "Godzilla" – 3:41
5. "Goin' Through the Motions" – 3:12
6. "Golden Age of Leather" – 5:51
7. "Kick Out the Jams (Live)" – 3:12 (MC5 cover)
8. "We Gotta Get Out of This Place (Live)" – 4:33 (The Animals cover)
9. "In Thee" – 3:48
10. "The Marshall Plan" – 5:24
11. "Veteran of the Psychic Wars" – 4:48
12. "Burnin' for You" – 4:30
13. "Dominance and Submission (Live)" – 5:56
14. "Take Me Away" – 4:30
15. "Shooting Shark" – 7:09
16. "Dancin' in the Ruins" – 4:00
17. "Perfect Water" – 5:29

Some of these songs were later included on the remastered editions of BÖC's studio albums.

== Personnel ==
The album is a compilation encompassing Blue Öyster Cult from the early 1970s to 1986. It does not include material from 1988's Imaginos.
