= The Essential Blue Öyster Cult =

Greatest hits album by Blue Öyster Cult
- Released: April 10, 2012
- Genre: Rock
- Length: 1:10:16
- Label: Sony

Blue Öyster Cult chronology
Setlist: The Very Best of Blue Öyster Cult Live (2010)	The Essential Blue Öyster Cult (2012)	The Complete Columbia Albums Collectiön (2012)

The Essential Blue Öyster Cult is a greatest hits album by the American rock band Blue Öyster Cult originally released on April 1, 2003, and later reissued in 2012.

== Critical reception ==
Professional ratings
Review scores
Source	Rating
AllMusic	4/5 stars

Reviewing the 2004 Issue, Wade Kergan stated that it includes "all killer, no filler" and that songs such as "Veteran of the Psychic Wars" and "Harvester of Eyes" "carry equal heft and help Essential live up to its name"

Reviewing the 2012 reissue, Stephen Thomas Erlewine stated that it "shares 21 tracks with Workshop of the Telescopes," and that it is as "thorough a retrospective as this beloved cult band deserves, a clear demonstration that the group's legacy cuts much deeper than (Don't Fear) The Reaper and Burnin' for You" Goldmine Magazine contributor Susan Sliwicki states that the 2012 reissue "gives a solid introduction to and overview of the band also known as 'the thinking man's heavy metal group.'" And that the "rollicking" live cover of "Roadhouse Blues" by The Doors distracted their brain in a good way. Tony Peters stated in a review of the 2012 reissue that "While not everything on The Essential Blue Öyster Cult can really be considered essential, it does give a nice overview of the entire band’s career, with a healthy dose of their early, mostly-forgotten material"

== Track listing ==
Disc 1

1. Cities on Flame with Rock and Roll – 4:05
2. Before the Kiss, a Redcap – 4:59
3. Stairways to the Stars – 3:45
4. Transmaniacon MC – 3:22
5. Buck's Boogie (live) – 5:18
6. The Red and the Black – 4:32
7. O.D.'d on Life Itself – 4:49
8. 7 Screaming Diz-Busters – 7:01
9. Career of Evil – 4:01
10. Flaming Telepaths – 5:18
11. Astronomy – 6:27
12. Hot Rails to Hell (live) – 5:32
13. Harvester of Eyes (live) – 4:23
14. Me 262 (live) – 8:06
15. Born to Be Wild (live) – 6:18

Disc 2

1. (Don't Fear) The Reaper – 5:09
2. This Ain't the Summer of Love – 2:22
3. E.T.I. (Extra Terrestrial Intelligence) (live) – 5:20
4. Godzilla – 3:42
5. I Love the Night – 4:25
6. Goin' Through the Motions – 3:13
7. In Thee – 3:48
8. Black Blade – 6:29
9. The Marshall Plan - 5:24
10. Veteran of the Psychic Wars – 4:49
11. Joan Crawford – 4:56
12. Burnin' for You - 4:29
13. Roadhouse Blues (live) – 9:15
14. Shooting Shark – 7:10
15. Take Me Away – 4:31
16. Dancin' in the Ruins – 4:00
