= Imaginos =

Studio album by Blue Öyster Cult
- Released: July 1988
- Recorded: 1981–1988
- Studios: Kingdom Sound Studios, Long Island, New York; Boogie Hotel Studios, Port Jefferson, New York; Alpha & Omega Studios, San Francisco, California
- Genres: Hard rock; heavy metal
- Length: 55:01
- Label: Columbia/Sony
- Producers: Sandy Pearlman; Albert Bouchard

Blue Öyster Cult chronology
Club Ninja (1985)	Imaginos (1988)	Bad Channels (1992)

Singles from Imaginos
- 1. "Astronomy" Released: October 1988 (UK)

Imaginos is the eleventh studio album by the American rock band Blue Öyster Cult. It was released in 1988, and was their last recording with their original record label, CBS/Columbia Records.

The album took nearly eight years to complete and was originally intended to be the first in a trilogy of solo albums by Blue Öyster Cult drummer and songwriter Albert Bouchard after he was fired from the band in August 1981. CBS rejected the album in 1984, but a re-worked version was eventually published as a product of the band. Many guest musicians contributed to the project over this eight-year span, including Joe Satriani, Aldo Nova, and Doors guitarist Robby Krieger, but some band members were barely involved in the recording process. Thus, Imaginos is often considered more as a project of producer and lyricist Sandy Pearlman than as a true album of the band.

Imaginos weaves scripts and poems by Pearlman, dating from the second half of the 1960s, into a concept album and rock opera about an alien conspiracy that is brought to fruition during the late 19th and early 20th century through the actions of Imaginos, an agent of evil. The tale combines elements of gothic literature and science fiction and is strongly inspired by the work of H. P. Lovecraft. Subtitled "a bedtime story for the children of the damned", it has an intricate storyline whose often-obscure lyrics contain many historical references, prompting speculation by fans and critics. It is often considered one of the heaviest albums released by Blue Öyster Cult, its music more akin to heavy metal than the melodic and commercial hard rock of their two previous works. The poor sales of those albums resulted in record label pressure on the band that led to their disbandment in 1986; a subsequent comeback featured only three members of the classic line-up.

The album received some critical acclaim, but was not a commercial success, and Columbia Records ended their contract with Blue Öyster Cult at the completion of the Imaginos Tour. Albert Bouchard, excluded from the recording progress of Imaginos after the initial rejection from Columbia Records, then took legal action against the band and the label to protect his rights as author and producer on the album. Blue Öyster Cult continued to perform and remained a live attraction, but ten years passed before they released an album of new songs.

== Background ==
=== Sandy Pearlman and The Soft Doctrines of Imaginos ===
The concept and the character of Imaginos were originally created by the young Sandy Pearlman for a collection of poems and scripts called The Soft Doctrines of Imaginos (sometimes reported as Immaginos), prior to 1971, during his formative years as a student of anthropology and sociology at Stony Brook University, Brandeis University and The New School. Pearlman combined cultural references learned in his studies with elements of gothic literature and science fiction, and created a secret history about the origin of the two world wars. Pearlman himself declared his predilection for the American weird fiction author "H. P. Lovecraft and other writers of that ilk", as well as for books on modern warfare and conspiracies.

Established by 1967 as a critic for the seminal US music magazine Crawdaddy!, Pearlman was also the mentor, manager and producer for the band Soft White Underbelly, which, after various name changes, became Blue Öyster Cult, a term taken from the Imaginos script. The adapted and amended rhymes of Pearlman, along with his friend and colleague Richard Meltzer's arcane writings, were used as lyrics for most of the band's early songs; musician and writer Lenny Kaye recalls in his introduction to the re-mastered edition of their first album that "the band kept a folder full of Meltzer's and Pearlman's word associations in their rehearsal room, and would leaf through it, setting fragments to music". Fragments of the Imaginos script are scattered out-of-context throughout the songs of the first four albums, where the original meanings are lost to listeners unaware of the larger picture. The resulting mystery feeds fan fascination for the music of Blue Öyster Cult, and is responsible for their reputation as "the world's brainiest heavy metal band". Much fan speculation centers around lyrics' relationship to the Imaginos storyline, while Pearlman's deliberate reticence and misleading in revealing his sources only augments the obscurity of the matter. During the band's first period of activity, the theme of the alien conspiracy became more defined and predominant in the mind of its author, to the point that notes on the cover of their 1974 album Secret Treaties referred to the secret history conceived by Pearlman, while its songs "Astronomy" and "Subhuman" contained lyrics fully dedicated to the Imaginos plot.

The band sought to separate creatively from Pearlman in the late 1970s; they avoided his lyrics and concepts and refused to record an album entirely dedicated to Imaginos, but eventually returned to his material for the lyrics of "Shadow of California" (from The Revölution by Night of 1983) and "When the War Comes" (from Club Ninja of 1985). Pearlman and Albert Bouchard hoped to record such an album, and as far back as 1972 had begun to write songs directly inspired by the Imaginos story. Nonetheless, with the exception of the extracts used for song lyrics, the text of The Soft Doctrines of Imaginos remains to this day largely unknown and unpublished.

=== Blue Öyster Cult in 1988 ===
The commercial success of the single "(Don't Fear) The Reaper" in 1976, and a series of Platinum and Gold discs in the following years, placed pressure on the band as their label, Columbia Records, expected them to repeat these successes. Despite good sales of the album Fire of Unknown Origin and the single "Burnin' for You", in August 1981 the conflicts and the stress accumulated in more than ten years of cohabitation led to the firing of drummer Albert Bouchard, a founding member and an important contributor to the songwriting and sound of the group, allegedly for unstable behavior. The relationship between the former band mates remained tense in the following years. Old feuds resurfaced during a short reunion tour with the original line-up in 1985, with the result that no one in the band accepted Bouchard back in Blue Öyster Cult. However, Bouchard still hoped to be reinstated in the band through his work done for Imaginos.

Albert Bouchard's departure started a rotation of personnel in the formerly stable band roster, which by 1986 left only Eric Bloom and Donald "Buck Dharma" Roeser as original members. Allen Lanier left in 1985 during the recording sessions for Club Ninja, unsatisfied by the music and annoyed at the presence of Tommy Zvoncheck as his replacement, while Joe Bouchard quit soon after that album's release to pursue different career opportunities, play other musical genres, and settle in his family life. The release of two expensive studio albums in 1983 and 1985, which received generally bad critical response and sold poorly, ruined the relationship with their demanding record label and left the band with little support and very few ideas on how to go on with their careers. As a result, "in the summer of 1986, the band semi-officially broke up", Bloom explained in an interview to the British music magazine Kerrang! in 1988. The final line-up of 1986 included Bloom, Roeser, Tommy Zvoncheck on keyboards, Jon Rogers on bass and Jimmy Willcox on drums.

Pearlman's and Steve Schenk's managerial efforts were rewarded when Blue Öyster Cult were hired for some gigs in Greece in July 1987. After a nine-month layoff, the band returned to activity and Allen Lanier re-joined. The European shows were a success, and the reformed line-up of Bloom, Roeser, Lanier, Jon Rogers and drummer Ron Riddle worked well together on stage. Blue Öyster Cult returned to the road in 1987 and 1988 with renewed enthusiasm, but without a new album to promote, until the release of Imaginos.

== Concept and storyline ==
Imaginos was envisioned as a rock opera to be published as a trilogy of double albums, with a storyline encompassing about two hundred years of history, from the beginning of the 19th century to the end of the 20th. This album represents an abbreviated version of the first volume of that planned trilogy, but with the songs arranged out of order, rendering the story harder to comprehend. Even when the song lyrics are analyzed in the chronological order that was devised by the authors and is followed in this section, the narrative progression is scarce and the content often difficult to decipher for the casual reader. However, thanks to various comments in interviews by Pearlman and Bouchard, and the extensive sleeve notes by Pearlman that were issued with the original release, it is possible to reconstruct the story to a great extent.

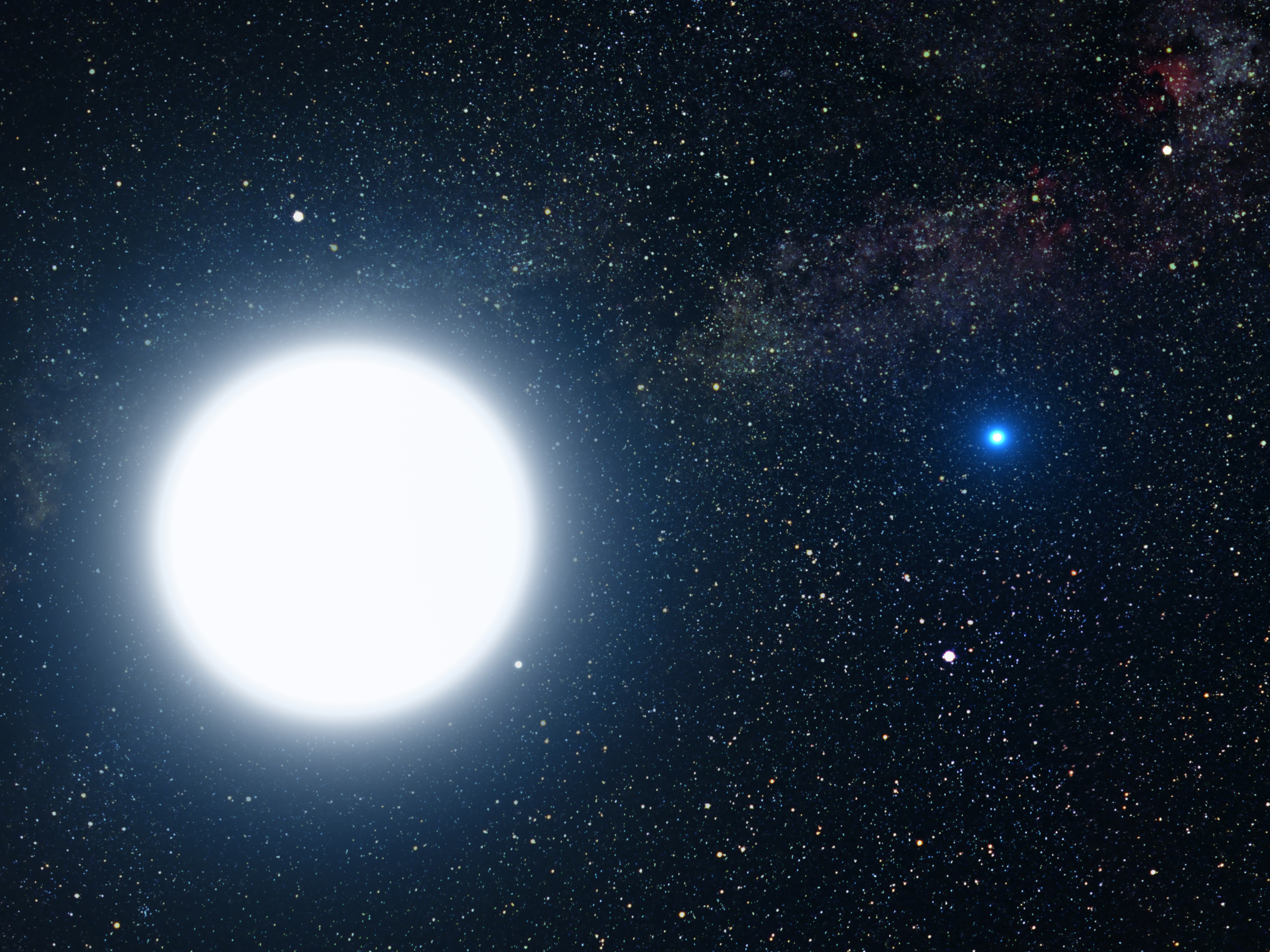
The star Sirius A and its companion Sirius B, the possible home of 'Les Invisibles'

Although often referred to as a dream, the concept behind Imaginos is what Pearlman described as "an interpretation of history – an explanation for the onset of World War I, or a revelation of the occult origins of it", which he crafted on elements of mythology, sociology, alchemy, science and occultism. This "combination of horror story and fairy tale" cites historical facts and characters, and is filled with literary references to ancient civilizations. These elements come together in a conspiracy theory of epic proportions, the subject of which is the manipulation of the course of human history.

Central to this story are Les Invisibles (The Invisible Ones), a group of seven beings worshipped by the natives of Mexico and Haiti prior to the arrival of Spanish colonists in the 16th century, identified by some fans as the Loa of the Voodoo religion. The nature of Les Invisibles is left unclear, although it is hinted that they may be extraterrestrials, or beings akin to the Great Old Ones in the works of H. P. Lovecraft. An interpretation of the lyrics of the song "Astronomy" by some fans suggests that the star Sirius is of particular astrological significance to Les Invisibles, with clues identifying it as their place of origin; it is during the so-called Dog Days of August, when Sirius is in conjunction with the Sun that their influence over mankind is at its apex. By subtly influencing the minds of men, the beings are said to be "playing with our history as if it's a game", affecting events in world history over the course of centuries. For the three centuries after European discovery of the New World, this game plays out as the desire for gold is used to transform Spain into the dominant power in Europe, only to be usurped by England in the 17th century and later, through technology, by other nations ("Les Invisibles").

The principal story begins in August 1804, with the birth of a "modified child" called Imaginos, in the American state of New Hampshire. Because of the astrological significance of the place and time of his birth, the hermaphroditic Imaginos is of particular interest to Les Invisibles, who begin granting him with superhuman abilities while he is young. Unaware of his true destiny or nature, the young Imaginos finds out that he is apparently able to change his appearance at will and see the future ("Imaginos"). As the child becomes an adult, he develops a sense of wanderlust. Billing himself as an adventurer, he sets out to explore Texas and the western frontier, arriving in New Orleans in 1829. It is there that he has a vision imploring him to travel to Mexico in search of an artifact "lost, last and luminous, scored to sky yet never found". Imaginos joins the crew of a ship traveling to the Yucatán Peninsula, but while passing through the Gulf of Mexico, the ship encounters a freak storm of which his visions failed to warn him ("Del Rio's Song"). The ship sinks with most of its crew, and Imaginos, half dead, washes ashore and is left for dead by the other survivors. As he lies dying "on a shore where oyster beds seem plush as down", Imaginos is addressed by a symphony of voices who identify themselves as Les Invisibles. Imaginos' true nature is revealed to him, and he is informed that the circumstances of his entire life have been manipulated to bring him to that specific moment in time. Having explained themselves to him, they offer him a choice – die as a human, or live as their servant ("Blue Öyster Cult"). Imaginos accepts their offer, and is resurrected from the dead by the Blue Öyster Cult, the servants of Les Invisibles. He is inducted into the cult and given a new name - Desdinova, "Eternal Light". He realizes that his descent and the origin of his powers comes from the stars where his masters live and becomes aware of his role in the making of history ("Astronomy").

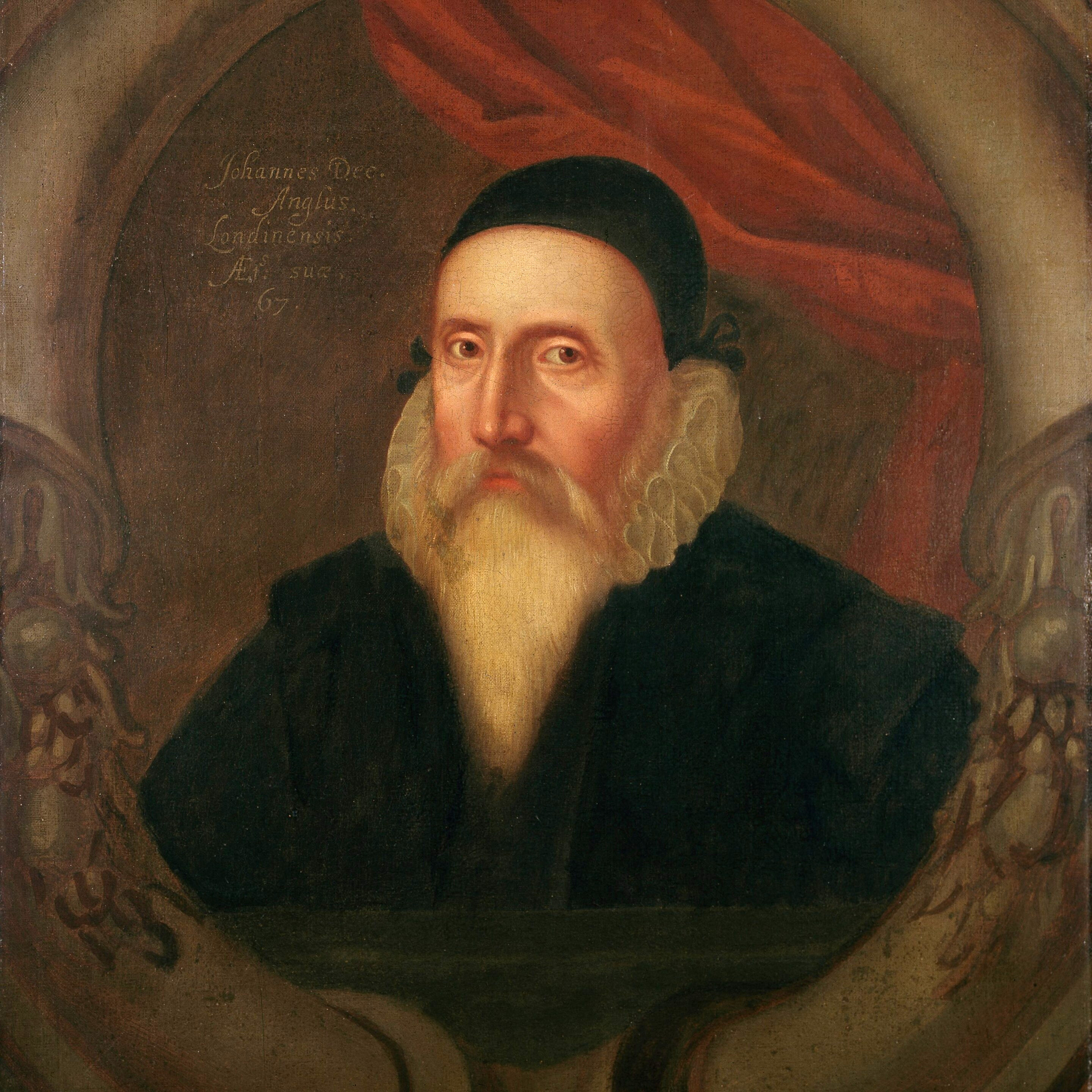
The English mathematician John Dee (1527-1608), another pawn of evil alien forces like Imaginos

From this point on, Imaginos becomes a tool in Les Invisibles' manipulation of human history. For the next sixty-three years, he insinuates himself into the world of European politics. He uses his ability to change identities to take the place of high-ranking officials, whose offices he uses to bring about Les Invisibles' will ("I Am the One You Warned Me Of"), introducing new knowledge and technology to the unsuspecting world ("The Siege and Investiture of Baron Von Frankenstein's Castle at Weisseria"). Through shapeshifting, Imaginos lives as both a man and a woman, using the name Desdinova for his female persona who at some point takes the office of foreign minister.

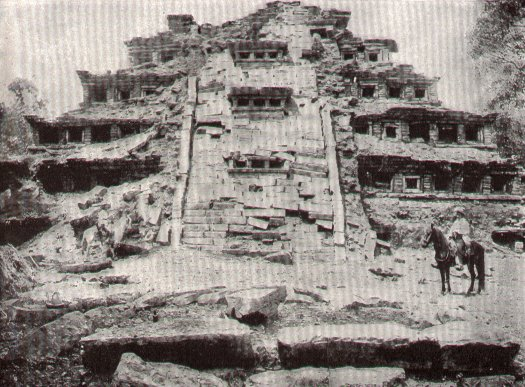
The Mexican pyramid of El Tajín, similar to the construction built around the 'Magna of Illusion'

By 1892, Imaginos is living in a mansion in Cornwall and has a nine-year-old granddaughter. Having by this time spent several decades studying mysticism and astrology, Imaginos discovers that Elizabethan England's rise as a superpower coincided with John Dee's acquisition of a magic obsidian mirror from Mexico, which serves as a bridge between Les Invisibles' alien world and ours, and the means to spread their influence on Earth. Some fans see Les Invisibles' actions in favour of England against Spain as a sort of vengeance for the extermination by the conquistadores of their worshippers in Central America, while others view their intervention as only part of the mysterious scheme carried on by the alien entities through the centuries ("In the Presence of Another World").

This revelation in mind, Imaginos decides that the time has come to reattempt his aborted mission to Mexico. On August 1, 1892, he sets sail aboard a "charmed ship" which, despite "storms on land and storms at sea", delivers him faithfully to Mexico. After several months exploring the jungles of Yucatán he finds an undiscovered Mayan pyramid. Following a long passage into the interior of the pyramid he discovers a chamber carved from solid jade, in which he finds the "Magna of Illusion", a twin of Dee's magic mirror. Stealing away with the artifact, he returns to Cornwall a year to the day of his departure, which coincides with the tenth birthday of his granddaughter. Imaginos gives the mirror to the young girl as a birthday present, and for the following 21 years it sits collecting dust in her attic, silently poisoning the minds of European leaders. In 1914, "World War I breaks out. A disease with a long incubation" ("Magna of Illusion").

The two songs excluded from the final release introduced further elements to the plot. "Gil Blanco County", a song with music written by Allen Lanier for Soft White Underbelly in the late 1960s and recorded in the unpublished Elektra album of the Stalk-Forrest Group (now available as St. Cecilia: The Elektra Recordings), has short and elusive lyrics apparently detailing the escape of Imaginos from Texas to Arizona. The other song, "The Girl That Love Made Blind", is an Albert Bouchard composition which explains that Imaginos' powers include the capacity of moving "in and through time", assuming different identities in every moment of history.

== Production ==
=== Albert Bouchard's solo album ===
Albert Bouchard began writing music for Imaginos following the release of the band's first album in 1972. There were plans as early as 1975 to release a concept album dedicated to Pearlman's scripts, but the material was not ready. All of the songs had been written by 1977, with the participation of various band members, and at least four of them ("Astronomy", "In the Presence of Another World", "I Am the One You Warned Me Of", "Imaginos") were completed and demoed during the recording sessions for the album Spectres. Demos of the other tracks were recorded by Albert Bouchard and remained in various stages of development during the following years, with the band uninterested in pursuing the Imaginos project that Albert Bouchard and Sandy Pearlman had been insistently proposing.

After Albert Bouchard's 1981 dismissal from Blue Öyster Cult, he and Pearlman worked on the material, having secured an advance from Columbia Records on the strength of the demos partially sung by Eric Bloom. The initial concept of a trilogy of double albums, largely based on music written during the band's many years of activity and on adapted and rewritten Pearlman lyrics linked by the Imaginos storyline, is reflected in the working titles: Act I: Imaginos, Act II: Germany Minus Zero and Counting (also known as Bombs over Germany and Half-Life Time), and Act III: The Mutant Reformation. These were intended as Albert Bouchard solo albums, a spin-off of Blue Öyster Cult main discography, although some fan opinion holds that Columbia Records had intended all along that the recordings would result in a new Blue Öyster Cult album.

Albert Bouchard and Pearlman set up the recording of the basic tracks for the first album of the trilogy in June 1982, with sound engineers Corky Stasiak and Paul Mandl at Kingdom Sound Studios in Long Island, New York, and at The Boogie Hotel, a studio owned by the boogie rock band Foghat and located in a large Victorian mansion in Port Jefferson, New York. At the same time and in the same facilities, Blue Öyster Cult were recording the album The Revölution by Night with producer Bruce Fairbairn. Albert Bouchard sang lead vocals and played guitar on all tracks, accompanied by:

- Tommy Morrongiello (Ian Hunter Band, Helen Wheels), guitars and arrangements,
- Jack Rigg (David Johansen Band) and Phil Grande (Peter Criss and Ellen Foley session musician), guitars,
- Tommy Mandel (Ian Hunter Band, Bryan Adams), keyboards,
- Kenny Aaronson, bass,
- Thommy Price (Scandal), drums.

The guitar solos by The Doors' Robby Krieger, who had played live with Blue Öyster Cult on Extraterrestrial Live, and guitar parts by Aldo Nova and the late Kevin Carlson, guitarist of the Aldo Nova Band, should also be ascribed to these recording sessions. According to Bouchard, Jeff Kawalik, Corky Stasiak, Helen Wheels, Glen Bell, Peggy Atkins and Casper McCloud were among the uncredited background vocalists which participated to these sessions.

They had gangs of people singing back-up vocals, and they had dozens of keyboard players too. It was a very long, involved project.

— Joe Bouchard

Allen Lanier, Joe Bouchard and Donald Roeser contributed instrumental parts and backing vocals to the tracks as guests. These remain Lanier's and Joe Bouchard's only contributions to Imaginos. Columbia Records' complaints about Albert Bouchard's lead vocals pushed him to finance multiple recordings with try-outs of singers, including Jon Rogers and Joey Cerisano, whose performances on some songs were used for the final mix of the album in 1988. The new recordings, overdubs by other uncredited musicians, and mixing lasted until 1984. Musicians involved in this second phase of recording included future BÖC keyboard player Tommy Zvoncheck, who had already played with Clarence Clemons, Public Image Ltd and The Dream Syndicate.

An almost-finished product that comprised more than ninety minutes of music and whose thirteen tracks included re-arranged versions of "Astronomy" and "Subhuman" (retitled "Blue Öyster Cult"), "Gil Blanco County", the ballad "The Girl That Love Made Blind" and a couple of chorales, was presented to Columbia Records executives in 1984. They rejected the album and decided to shelve it, officially because of Albert Bouchard's vocals and the lack of commercial perspectives.

=== The Blue Öyster Cult album ===
Despite the firm intention of Sandy Pearlman and Albert Bouchard to salvage the project, the recordings remained unfinished and untouched for more than two years due to lack of funding. While struggling with the long, complex and expensive production of the Blue Öyster Cult's album Club Ninja, Pearlman associated himself with Daniel J. Levitin, A&R director of the local punk label 415 Records, with whom he shared academic interests in neuroscience. In 1986, Pearlman leased Studio C of San Francisco's Hyde Street Recording Studios, and dubbed it Alpha & Omega Studios. Pearlman and Levitin produced various bands there, and Pearlman sub-leased the studio to other producers. In September 1986, when the poor sales of Club Ninja resulted in a commercial failure and the group disbanded, the lack of new material from the band for the foreseeable future prompted Pearlman to propose Imaginos to Columbia Records as a new Blue Öyster Cult album. He obtained a small budget from the record label to remix the album and to add the vocals of Roeser and Bloom, singers of all the hits produced by Blue Öyster Cult.

With Imaginos again a work in progress at the end of 1986, band manager Steve Schenk contacted Albert Bouchard to get the original recordings he still owned. Pearlman, with the help of engineers Paul Mandl and Steve Brown, spent his time cleaning up, re-arranging and remixing the original recordings, using state-of-the-art technology and the collaborations of studio musicians. Virtuoso guitarist Joe Satriani financed the recording of his second album, Surfing with the Alien, through his work on Imaginos. Similarly, thrash metal guitarist Marc Biedermann, whose band Blind Illusion was recording at Hyde Street Studios, mixed the album The Sane Asylum at Pearlman's studio in exchange for his collaboration. Biedermann declared in a 2008 interview that he "played more lead guitar on that album than Buck Dharma". Roeser went to California in early 1987 to record his lead vocals and some guitar parts, while Tommy Zvoncheck, still a member of Blue Öyster Cult, re-recorded most of the keyboards on the album. The last parts recorded were the lead vocals by Eric Bloom, who was in the studio in early 1988. Donald Roeser later summed up his and Bloom's late involvement in the making of the album by saying "Imaginos was our parting of the ways. That was something that Eric and I agreed to do, sort of, out of respect for Sandy and his effort that he made with Imaginos".

The as-imagined album and the as-released album bear little relation to each other. The final version of Imaginos is almost forty minutes shorter than the first version of 1984 and has two fewer songs, but as Pearlman explained, "we ran out of money and couldn't do the whole thing". The rhythm section of the original recording was kept mostly intact, but many guitars and most of the keyboards and lead vocals were re-recorded or remixed. The song order was scrambled out of the fixed chronology, possibly because of the label executives' intervention to have a more commercially attractive product. The sleeve notes' definition of the album as a "random access myth (where) everything happens all at once", appears to many as a posthumous justification for the mixed-up song order. Imaginos does not contain ballads or an immediately recognizable commercial single, and its music is often considered the heaviest produced by Blue Öyster Cult, the best attempt by the band to produce a heavy metal album. Critics and fans point to elements of progressive rock also present in the music, which create a dark and "ominous" atmosphere that fits the obscure content of the song lyrics.

== Packaging ==
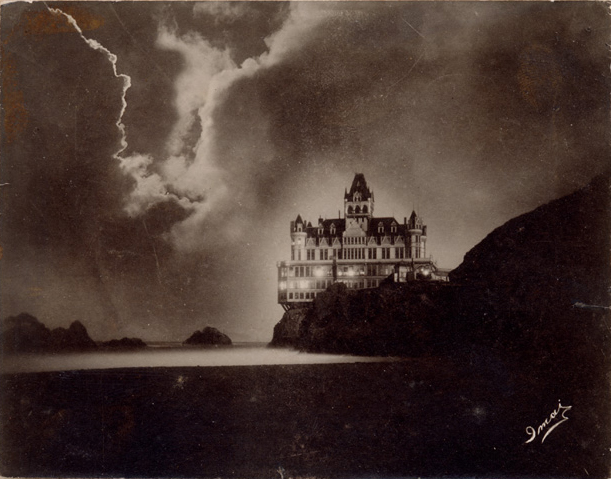
The original photo of the Cliff House used for the album cover

Artist Greg Scott, who had supplied the cover art for the Blue Öyster Cult albums Fire of Unknown Origin, Extraterrestrial Live and The Revolution by Night, worked with Sandy Pearlman for several months in 1984 to prepare paintings inspired by the Imaginos saga for the gatefold cover of the expected double album. "And none of that was ever seen, because it was shelved", Scott remarked in an interview with Canadian journalist Martin Popoff.

The art direction for the 1988 release was instead put in the hands of CBS Records' art director Arnold Levine and his staff. They based the cover art on a fin de siècle image of the Cliff House, a restaurant perched on the cliffs just north of Ocean Beach on the western side of San Francisco, California, built with the architectural style of a Victorian château and destroyed by fire in 1907. The back cover is a maritime landscape, modified to appear as the continuation of the picture on the front and similarly tinted in sinister black and grey colors.

The inner sleeve, besides the credits and Sandy Pearlman's lengthy notes on the Imaginos story, sports a large black and white photo by landscape British photographer Simon Marsden of Duntrune Castle in Argyllshire, Scotland.

The credits printed on the sleeve of the first release were largely incomplete and made no distinction between the recording sessions of 1982-84 and those of 1987-88, apparently validating the false assumption that the original line-up of Blue Öyster Cult had reunited for the making of the album. Aside from the list of band members, the credits reported only some session musicians and other members of the so-called Guitar Orchestra of the State of Imaginos, and omitted other personnel who had contributed to Imaginos.

== Release ==
Imaginos was mastered at Precision Lacquer in Los Angeles by Stephen Marcussen and finally released as LP and CD in July 1988, almost eight years after the work on it had begun and twenty-three years after the concept of Imaginos was created. A limited edition of the album was also released in blue vinyl.

Astronomy (1988)
"Astronomy" was the first single extracted from Imaginos and was sung by Buck Dharma, instead of Eric Bloom who performed in the original version of 1974

The first single extracted from the album was an edited version of "Astronomy", which was released as a 7", as a 12" and as a CD single. American author Stephen King recorded the spoken introduction to the radio edit of the song, a reading of the lines written on the back cover of the LP. The 12" contains various mixes of "Astronomy", including one sung by Albert Bouchard. The single received sufficient radio airplay to reach No. 12 in the Billboard Hot Mainstream Rock Tracks chart in September 1988, but it did not enter the US singles chart. The CD single "In the Presence of Another World" was issued later only for promotional purposes, but received no attention from FM radio stations.

The album was largely neglected by the record label, which did little to no promotion in the US. Pearlman stated that "there was actually no intention on the part of Columbia Records at all to promote it. (...) Basically the people wanted to work it and they were told not to work it". Roeser commented later that he did not "think Sony’s ever really known how to sell us, from the beginning (...) and Columbia never felt that they knew how to market us". Imaginos fared better with CBS International, which distributed the album abroad and produced a music video for "Astronomy" in the UK, which aired in coincidence with the European tour dates of 1989. The video clip does not feature members of the band, but begins with the spoken introduction by Stephen King and focuses on the storyline narrated in the album.

Albert Bouchard had been completely excluded from the retooling of the album for contractual reasons, but hoped to have his long work rewarded with a credit as co-producer, and to be paid accordingly. After the disbandment of Blue Öyster Cult, he contacted the other band members in an attempt to organize a 1987 reunion tour, with the original line-up, to promote Imaginos. His economic and membership requests were both rejected, due to resistances within the label and within the band, so he filed a lawsuit in 1989 against the management of Blue Öyster Cult and Columbia Records to receive payment for his work. The lawsuit was settled out of court, but his resentment towards Sandy Pearlman for what he felt was a theft of his work never eased, eliminating any chance of future collaborations for the completion of the Imaginos saga.

One of the final mixes of 1984, titled Albert Bouchard's Imaginos, surfaced on the Internet in 2003 as a free download. The album contains music recorded during the sessions from 1982 to 1984 and permits a comparison of arrangements, vocals and sound with the version published in 1988.

Imaginos was re-issued only once, through Sony BMG sub-label American Beat Records in December 2007. The 2007 reissue was remastered to adjust the volume levels and included a CD sleeve with corrected, but not complete, credits. A new remastered version of Imaginos is included in The Columbia Albums Collection boxed set, issued by Sony/Legacy in November 2012.

== Tour ==
Blue Öyster Cult interrupted their schedule of US shows only just before the album release in June 1988, to familiarize the band members with the new material. The 1987 formation with Bloom, Roeser, Lanier, Rogers and Riddle remained the closest available to a full reunion, given Joe Bouchard's unwillingness to participate and the opposition to Albert Bouchard. The Imaginos Tour began in the East Coast of the US in July, and continued on to most of the States. The set lists were based mainly on old material and included only two or three songs from Imaginos, usually "I Am the One You Warned Me Of", "In the Presence of Another World" and the new version of "Astronomy". Blue Öyster Cult visited Canada in January 1989, France in February, the United Kingdom in March, and concluded their European tour in Germany in April.

During the following US tour, the new management of Columbia Records, which had been sold to Sony Music in 1988, terminated Columbia's almost 20-year relationship with Blue Öyster Cult because of their low sales. This left them without a recording contract for the next ten years. Eric Bloom stated that "in general, CBS was straight with us, when we had fans working inside the company", but after "3-4 different Presidents of the company came and went" the commercial appeal of Blue Öyster Cult had disappeared for the new management.

A review of their performance at The Ritz in New York on January 6, 1989, highlights the good shape and musicianship of the band, but remarks that the new songs were played with considerably less enthusiasm than the rest of the show. Although the band continued to tour regularly, the songs from Imaginos had already disappeared from their shows by the end of 1989, never to be performed live again.

== Critical and commercial reception ==
Professional ratings
Review scores
Source	Rating
AllMusic	3.5/5 stars
Collector's Guide to Heavy Metal	6/10
Rolling Stone	3/5 stars
Storia della Musica	3.5/5 stars

Imaginos received mixed reviews both from professional critics and fans.

David Fricke, in his review for the magazine Rolling Stone, considers Imaginos "the best black-plastic blitz to bear the Cult's trademark cross and claw since 1974's Secret Treaties", but remarks that the "lengthy gestation" of the album and the many musicians involved makes it "a bit of a cheat for Cult Purists", and that is "only an illusionary re-creation of the way BÖC used to be". William Ruhlmann of AllMusic wrote that Imaginos is "the album that comes closest to defining Blue Öyster Cult" and their "creative swan song", and "perhaps BÖC's most consistent album, certainly its most uncompromising (...) and also the closest thing to a real heavy-metal statement from a band that never quite fit that description". For Don Kaye of Kerrang!, the album is "the best BÖC slab since (...) Cultösaurus Erectus and harks back in style and attitude towards the brilliance of masterpieces like Secret Treaties and Spectres". A contrary evaluation comes from Blue Öyster Cult biographer Martin Popoff, who has "come to dismiss it as somewhat of a sell-out". Despite it being "the band's heaviest, fulfilling many a fan’s wish for sustained metal", Popoff finds "the whole thing perched on the edge of parody, too dressy and fantastical lyrically in a painfully self-conscious way, (...) a laborious exercise in expected weird", ultimately "a baffling yet anticlimactic punctuation to the band’s perplexed career". A reviewer from the Italian music criticism site Storia della Musica points out that the album is now a 'cult' item for its rarity, its content and the scarce love shown by the band for this work. He writes that "it could have been the Tommy or The Dark Side of the Moon of BÖC" but, "despite the profound influences it evokes", its "mutilated and sabotaged form" and the disinterest of the musicians involved makes Imaginos only a wasted opportunity.

The reviews posted by Blue Öyster Cult's fans and by buyers of the album on the customer review site Epinions and on the online collaborative metadata database Rate Your Music are in general quite positive, praising Imaginos as a "creative masterpiece", but underlining that the work is not a group effort but "the brain-child of original drummer Albert Bouchard and longtime producer and lyricist Sandy Pearlman". A professional Italian reviewer describes the Blue Öyster Cult name on the cover as "only a commercial decoy" for an Albert Bouchard solo album.

The album entered the Billboard 200 album chart on August 19, 1988, peaked at No. 122, and exited the charts on October 8. It sold about 50,000 copies in the US, and was a commercial failure for Columbia Records and a financial failure for the band, which was forced through legal action to pay back the money used for both the recording of Albert Bouchard's solo album and for the re-recording of Imaginos. It was their last album to enter the Billboard charts until The Symbol Remains in 2020.

== Influence ==
The manga Battle Angel Alita by Yukito Kishiro contains references to Imaginos. Particularly the name of the principal villain - Desty Nova - and the cyber-body of Alita, called imaginos.

In 2021, Canadian rock critic Martin Popoff released a book on the Imaginos mythos entitled Flaming Telepaths: Imaginos Expanded and Specified.

== Albert Bouchard's new version ==
In the spring of 2020, an announcement was made on www.goldminemag.com that Albert Bouchard would be releasing ReImaginos, his own reinvention of the concept of Imaginos, in the fall of 2020. Bouchard eventually released 3 albums based on the concept: ReImaginos (2020), Imaginos II - Bombs Over Germany (Minus Zero And Counting) (2021), and Imaginos III - Mutant Reformation (2023).

== Track listing ==
Side one
No.	Title	Writer(s)	Lead vocals	Length
1.	"I Am the One You Warned Me Of"	Albert Bouchard, Donald Roeser, Sandy Pearlman	Eric Bloom, Jon Rogers	5:04
2.	"Les Invisibles"	A. Bouchard, Pearlman	Roeser	5:33
3.	"In the Presence of Another World"	Joe Bouchard, Pearlman	Bloom	6:26
4.	"Del Rio's Song"	A. Bouchard, Pearlman	Bloom	5:31
5.	"The Siege and Investiture of Baron von Frankenstein's Castle at Weisseria"	A. Bouchard, Pearlman	Joey Cerisano	6:43

Side two
No.	Title	Writer(s)	Lead vocals	Length
1.	"Astronomy"	A. Bouchard, J. Bouchard, Pearlman	Roeser	6:47
2.	"Magna of Illusion"	A. Bouchard, Roeser, Pearlman	Roeser	5:53
3.	"Blue Öyster Cult"	Bloom, Pearlman	A. Bouchard, Roeser	7:18
4.	"Imaginos"	A. Bouchard, Pearlman	Rogers	5:46
Total length:				55:01

== Personnel ==
Band members

- Eric Bloom – vocals
- Albert Bouchard – guitar, percussion, vocals, associate producer
- Joe Bouchard – keyboards, backing vocals
- Allen Lanier – keyboards
- Donald 'Buck Dharma' Roeser – guitars, vocals

Session musicians

- Phil Grande – guitars
- Tommy Zvoncheck – keyboards
- Kenny Aaronson – bass
- Thommy Price – drums
- Joey Cerisano – vocals
- Jon Rogers – vocals
- Jack Secret (aka Tony Geranios) – backing vocals
- Shocking U – backing vocals on track 3
- Daniel Levitin – guitar sounds (uncredited)

Guitar Orchestra of the State of Imaginos

- Marc Biedermann (lead guitar on tracks 1 and 3)
- Kevin Carlson
- Robby Krieger (lead guitar on tracks 7 and 8)
- Tommy Morrongiello
- Aldo Nova (lead guitar on track 4)
- Jack Rigg
- Joe Satriani (lead guitar on track 5)

Technical personnel

- Sandy Pearlman – producer, engineer, mixing
- Corky Stasiak – basic tracks engineer
- Paul Mandl – engineer
- Steve Brown – mixing

== Charts ==
Chart (1988)	Peak position
Finnish Albums (The Official Finnish Charts)	26
US Billboard 200	122
