= Heaven Forbid =

Studio album by Blue Öyster Cult
- Released: March 24, 1998
- Recorded: Millbrook Sound Studios, Millbrook, New York, U.S.
- Genres: Hard rock; heavy metal; pop rock
- Length: 45:07
- Labels: CMC; Frontiers
- Producers: Buck Dharma, Eric Bloom, Steve Schenck

Blue Öyster Cult chronology
Cult Classic (1994)	Heaven Forbid (1998)	St. Cecilia: The Elektra Recordings (2001)

Alternative cover

Professional ratings
Review scores
Source	Rating
AllMusic	2.5/5 stars
Collector's Guide to Heavy Metal	8/10

Heaven Forbid is the twelfth studio album by American rock band Blue Öyster Cult, released on March 24, 1998. It was the band's first studio album with new material in a decade (not counting the 1992 soundtrack to Bad Channels). American science fiction and horror writer John Shirley wrote lyrics to most of the songs on the album. While he is primarily known as an author for his cyberpunk stories, many of the lyrics on this album revolve around early science fiction and mystery motifs. The album's working title was 'Ezekiel's Wheel,' after the Biblical story that some take to reference an early visitation by UFOs.

The album's live song "In Thee" was originally featured on Mirrors. "Still Burnin'" is a sequel to the song "Burnin' for You", which appeared on Fire of Unknown Origin.

The inspiration for the alternative cover is Morgan Fairchild. This image also appears on the reverse of the insert, and was originally intended to be the front piece as indicated by advertisements from the period.

"Harvest Moon", "Power Underneath Despair", "Cold Gray Light of Dawn" and "Still Burnin'" were debuted live during the 1992 tour.

The album was re-released on April 17, 2020, by Frontiers.

== Track listing ==
No.	Title	Writer(s)	Length
1.	"See You in Black"	Eric Bloom, Donald Roeser, John Shirley	3:17
2.	"Harvest Moon"	Roeser	4:55
3.	"Power Underneath Despair"	Bloom, Roeser, Shirley	3:29
4.	"X-Ray Eyes"	Roeser, Shirley	3:48
5.	"Hammer Back"	Bloom, Roeser, Shirley	3:35
6.	"Damaged"	Roeser, Shirley	4:22
7.	"Cold Gray Light of Dawn"	Bloom, Roeser, Shirley	3:53
8.	"Real World"	Roeser, Shirley	5:11
9.	"Live for Me"	Roeser, Shirley	5:19
10.	"Still Burnin'"	Roeser, Jon Rogers	3:37
11.	"In Thee" (Live At Millbrook)	Allen Lanier	3:40

== Personnel ==
=== Band members ===
- Eric Bloom – guitars, keyboards, lead vocals on tracks 1, 3, 5, and 7, producer
- Donald "Buck Dharma" Roeser – guitars, keyboards, lead vocals on tracks 2, 4, 6, 8–11, producer
- Allen Lanier – guitars, keyboards
- Danny Miranda – bass guitar on tracks 1, 4–9, 11, backing vocals
- Jon Rogers – bass guitar on tracks 2, 3 and 10, backing vocals
- Bob Rondinelli – drums on track 9
- Chuck Burgi – drums on tracks 1–8 and 10, backing vocals

=== Additional musicians ===
- George Cintron – additional vocals
- Tony Perrino – additional keyboards

=== Production ===
- Steve Schenck – producer on tracks 2, 3, 10, management
- Paul Orofino – engineer, mixing
- Marc Senesac – engineer and mixing on tracks 2, 3, 10
- Leon Zervos – mastering

== Charts ==
Chart (1998)	Peak position
UK Independent Albums (Official Charts)	29
UK Rock & Metal Albums (Official Charts)	30
