= The Symbol Remains =

Studio album by Blue Öyster Cult
- Released: October 9, 2020
- Recorded: February 2019 – April 2020
- Studios: Mercy College Studio A, Dobbs Ferry, New York
- Genres: Hard rock; heavy metal
- Length: 61:06
- Label: Frontiers
- Producers: Eric Bloom, Buck Dharma, Richie Castellano

Blue Öyster Cult chronology
Curse of the Hidden Mirror (2001)	The Symbol Remains (2020)	Ghost Stories (2024)

The Symbol Remains is the fourteenth (Note: This could be counted as either the group's fourteenth or fifteenth studio effort, depending on whether 1994's Cult Classic, an album consisting of re-recordings of some of the band's earlier music, is considered a proper studio album or not.) studio album by American rock band Blue Öyster Cult, released on October 9, 2020. The album title comes from a lyric in the song "Shadow of California" on the band's 1983 LP The Revölution by Night.

This is the band's first studio release since 2001's Curse of the Hidden Mirror, making it the band's longest gap between studio albums. It also marks the recording debut by long-time members Jules Radino and Richie Castellano, as well as the first studio album since 1985's Club Ninja to not feature Allen Lanier, who died in 2013. The album entered the Billboard 200 album chart at No. 192, making it their first album to chart in the United States since Imaginos in August 1988.

== Background ==
Low sales of the band's previous studio album, Curse of the Hidden Mirror (2001), contributed to their disinterest in recording new music. Frontman Eric Bloom noted in 2017 that "it costs money to make a record" and that the time spent producing an album would be better spent touring "than making a record that nobody's going to buy." He did not completely rule out the possibility of the band going back to the studio.

Lead guitarist Buck Dharma stated in another interview that the band had "tentative" plans to record in 2017, and noted that the then-current band was "so good it would be a shame not to." Dharma also revealed that he had originally intended to contact longtime band manager and collaborator Sandy Pearlman about ideas for the album, but Pearlman's death in 2016 from a stroke prevented that from happening.

In April 2019, Bloom said that a new album would eventually arrive, and announced that the band would "soon" be signing a new recording contract. In July 2019, it was announced that the band had signed with Frontiers Records and that the album would be released in 2020. Bloom noted that half the songs were already written, with the remaining portion to be written during production of the album.

== Songs ==
Several singles and music videos were released to promote the album. On August 28, 2020, "That Was Me" and "Box in My Head" were released for streaming on YouTube. Several days later, a music video featuring former member Albert Bouchard was released for the former. A video was released for "Box in My Head" on September 10. Additionally, the band released a video for "Tainted Blood" on September 25. On the day of the album's release, the band released a video for "The Alchemist".

According to Buck Dharma, "Box in My Head" is about "trying to intrigue a lady" and that the mind is an "enigmatic and curious place." It features lyrics by novelist John Shirley, a frequent collaborator with the band. "The Alchemist" references the H.P. Lovecraft short story The Alchemist, while "Florida Man" references the internet meme of the same name. The Castellano-penned "The Return of St. Cecilia" references a song from the album that the band recorded for Elektra Records in 1970 under the name "Stalk-Forrest Group." Another Castellano contribution, "The Machine," is about cell phones.

A different recording of the song "Fight" had been released by Dharma in 2015, as a solo track. Additionally, demo recordings of two other songs, "Nightmare Epiphany" and "Secret Road" had been released in 2000 in an archive compilation released by Dharma.

"Edge of the World" is a song about conspiracy theories and references alien abductions.

== Reception ==
Professional ratings
Aggregate scores
Source	Rating
Metacritic	77/100
Review scores
Source	Rating
AllMusic	3.5/5 stars
Louder Sound	4/5 stars
Uncut	60/100
The Wire	80/100

The Symbol Remains has received a positive reception from critics, and "The Alchemist" was particularly praised. The album holds a 77/100 aggregate rating on Metacritic as of January 2021.

Dom Lawson of Blabbermouth.net gave the album a positive review, citing songs like "Box in My Head" and "The Alchemist" as high points on the album. Scott McLennan of The Arts Fuse hailed "The Alchemist" as "a sprawling tale of a cursed monarchy, palace treachery, and sorcery", noting that Bloom's performance was at "peak harrowing form". McLennan also praised Dharma's "speedy country-rock riff" playing on "Train True (Lennie's Song)". Thom Jurek of AllMusic hailed the album as a "thoroughly inspired" return for the band, and compared the sound of many of the album's songs to Blue Öyster Cult's back catalogue, as well as groups like Head East and Iron Maiden. Writing for BraveWords, Paul Stenning cited the material as "memorable" and marked out "Nightmare Epiphany", "Edge of the World" and "Stand and Fight" as standout tracks.

A review in Uncut cited "The Machine", "Stand and Fight" and "The Alchemist" as the album's best moments.

== Track listing ==
No.	Title	Writer(s)	Lead vocals	Length
1.	"That Was Me"	Eric Bloom, Richie Castellano, John Shirley	Bloom	3:18
2.	"Box in My Head"	Donald Roeser, Shirley	Roeser	3:46
3.	"Tainted Blood"	Bloom, Castellano	Castellano	4:17
4.	"Nightmare Epiphany"	Shirley, D. Roeser	Roeser	5:30
5.	"Edge of the World"	Castellano	Bloom	4:52
6.	"The Machine"	Castellano	Castellano	4:14
7.	"Train True (Lennie's Song)"	D. Roeser, Zeke Roeser	Roeser	3:57
8.	"The Return of St. Cecilia"	Castellano, Richard Meltzer	Castellano	4:12
9.	"Stand and Fight"	Bloom, Castellano	Bloom	4:48
10.	"Florida Man"	D. Roeser, Shirley	Roeser	4:08
11.	"The Alchemist"	Castellano	Bloom	6:00
12.	"Secret Road"	Shirley, D. Roeser	Roeser	5:24
13.	"There's a Crime"	Jeff Denny, Jules Radino	Bloom	3:37
14.	"Fight"	D. Roeser, Ira Rosoff, James Wold	Roeser	3:12
Total length:				61:06

Japan bonus track
No.	Title	Length
15.	"That Was Me" (acoustic remix)

== Personnel ==
=== Band ===
- Eric Bloom – guitars, keyboards, vocals
- Donald "Buck Dharma" Roeser – guitars, keyboards, programming, vocals
- Richie Castellano – guitars, keyboards, programming, vocals
- Danny Miranda – bass guitar, backing vocals
- Jules Radino – drums, percussion, backing vocals

=== Additional musicians ===
- Albert Bouchard – backing vocals, cowbell and percussion on "That Was Me"
- Andy Ascolese – keyboards on "Nightmare Epiphany" and "Florida Man"; piano on "The Alchemist"
- David Lucas – backing vocals on "Edge of the World", "The Machine", "Florida Man" and "Secret Road"; cowbell on "Fight"
- Phil Castellano – harmonica on "Train True (Lennie's Song)"; gang vocals on "Stand and Fight"; backing vocals and claps on "Florida Man"; choir programming on "Secret Road"
- Kasim Sulton – backing vocals on "The Return of St. Cecilia" and "There's a Crime"
- Steve La Cerra – gang vocals on "Stand and Fight"; backing vocals and claps on "Florida Man"
- Kevin Young – gang vocals on "Stand and Fight"; backing vocals and claps on "Florida Man"
- John Castellano – backing vocal on "Florida Man"
- Jeff Nolan – theremin on "Fight"

=== Production ===
- Produced by Eric Bloom, Buck Dharma and Richie Castellano
- Executive produced by Steve Schenck
- Chief Engineer – Richie Castellano
- Overdub engineering – Buck Dharma
- Engineer – Sam Stauff
- Assistant engineer – Steve La Cerra
- Mixed by Tom Lord-Alge
- Mastered by Ted Jensen

== Charts ==
Chart performance for The Symbol Remains
Chart (2020)	Peak position
Belgian Albums (Ultratop Flanders)	186
Belgian Albums (Ultratop Wallonia)	27
Finnish Albums (Suomen virallinen lista)	17
French Albums (SNEP)	64
German Albums (Offizielle Top 100)	39
Japanese Albums (Oricon)	161
Scottish Albums (Official Charts)	31
Swedish Albums (Sverigetopplistan)	31
UK Independent Albums (Official Charts)	8
UK Rock & Metal Albums (Official Charts)	5
US Billboard 200	192
US Independent Albums (Billboard)	36
US Top Album Sales (Billboard)	12
US Top Hard Rock Albums (Billboard)	10
US Top Rock Albums (Billboard)	32
US Indie Store Album Sales (Billboard)	13
