= Club Ninja =

Studio album by Blue Öyster Cult
- Released: December 10, 1985
- Studios: Bearsville Studios, Bearsville, New York; Boogie Hotel Studios, Port Jefferson, New York; Tallysin Studios, Syosset, New York; Warehouse Studios, New York City
- Genres: Hard rock; pop rock
- Length: 44:26
- Label: Columbia
- Producer: Sandy Pearlman

Blue Öyster Cult chronology
The Revölution by Night (1983)	Club Ninja (1985)	Imaginos (1988)

Singles from Club Ninja
- 1. "White Flags" Released: December 1985 (UK); 2. "Dancin' in the Ruins" Released: March 1986 (US); 3. "Perfect Water" Released: July 1986

Club Ninja is the tenth studio album by American rock band Blue Öyster Cult, released on December 10, 1985, in the United Kingdom and on February 11, 1986, in the United States. The album was intended as a comeback for the band, whose previous album The Revölution by Night failed to attain Gold status following the success of 1981's Fire of Unknown Origin and 1982's Extraterrestrial Live. Club Ninja sold more than 175,000 copies, falling well short of gold status again, and because of its high cost, Columbia Records executives deemed it a commercial failure. The album was re-issued on compact disc on March 10, 2009, by Sony-owned reissue label American Beat Records, which had also reissued the band's 1988 album, Imaginos.

Club Ninja's first single, "Dancin' in the Ruins," was a minor radio and MTV hit. "When the War Comes" features a brief spoken-word introduction by radio personality Howard Stern, whose cousin was married to guitarist and vocalist Eric Bloom. The lyrics to "Spy in the House of the Night" were written by Richard Meltzer, originally based on his poem "Out of Smokes," which was published in his 1999 book Holes. The album was the band's last studio album with bassist Joe Bouchard.

Club Ninja was the only BÖC studio album not to feature keyboardist Allen Lanier until his death in 2013. Lanier was replaced temporarily by Tommy Zvoncheck, who'd previously been keyboardist for Aldo Nova's live band, for a Japanese tour by Public Image Ltd. and had already contributed to the initial recordings of Blue Öyster Cult's 1988 concept album Imaginos. The album also features drummer Jimmy Wilcox, formerly of Rick Derringer and Scandal, who replaced Rick Downey. Wilcox remained with the band until 1987.

== Reception ==
Professional ratings
Review scores
Source	Rating
AllMusic	2/5 stars
Collector's Guide to Heavy Metal	7/10
Sounds	5/5 stars

Edwin Pouncey, reviewing the album for Sounds, gave it a five-star rating, describing it as "a seemingly leaden slab of AOR which suddenly turns into gold in your hands", praising Sandy Pearlman's production. Modern reviews are quite negative, with AllMusic calling Club Ninja a testimony of "Blue Öyster Cult's gradual disintegration" and "decline into musical anonymity". Canadian journalist Martin Popoff judged the album the "least attached to the BÖC body of work, painfully constructed and baffling in its bad taste", showing a band struggling to update their sound to more "commercial avenues" without achieving the expected radio-friendly results.

== Track listing ==
Side one
No.	Title	Writer(s)	Lead vocals	Length
1.	"White Flags"	Hugh Leggatt, Gordon Leggatt	Eric Bloom	4:41
2.	"Dancin' in the Ruins"	Larry Gottlieb, Justin Scanlon	Donald Roeser	4:00
3.	"Make Rock, Not War"	Bob Halligan, Jr.	Bloom	3:58
4.	"Perfect Water"	Roeser, Jim Carroll	Roeser	5:31
5.	"Spy in the House of the Night"	Roeser, Richard Meltzer	Roeser	4:23

Side two
No.	Title	Writer(s)	Lead vocals	Length
6.	"Beat 'Em Up"	Halligan, Jr.	Bloom	3:24
7.	"When the War Comes"	Joe Bouchard, Sandy Pearlman	Bouchard, Roeser	6:02
8.	"Shadow Warrior"	Eric Bloom, Roeser, Eric Van Lustbader	Bloom, Roeser	5:42
9.	"Madness to the Method"	Roeser, Dick Trismen	Roeser	7:25

== Personnel ==
Band members

- Eric Bloom – lead vocals, "stun" (rhythm) guitar
- Donald "Buck Dharma" Roeser – lead vocals, lead guitar, keyboards
- Joe Bouchard – bass, backing & lead vocals, guitar
- Tommy Zvoncheck – keyboards, organ, piano
- Jimmy Wilcox – backing vocals, percussion

Additional musicians

- Thommy Price – drums
- Phil Grande – additional guitar
- Kenny Aaronson – additional bass
- David Lucas, Joni Peltz, Dave Immer, Joe Caro – background vocals
- Howard Stern – "When the War Comes" spoken word

Production

- Sandy Pearlman – producer, management
- Paul Mandl – engineer, overdubs editor, programming
- John Devlin, Toby Scott – engineers
- David Lucas – additional production
- Brian McGee – mixing

== Charts ==
Chart (1985)	Peak position
Finnish Albums (The Official Finnish Charts)	21
Swedish Albums (Sverigetopplistan)	41
US Billboard 200	63
