= Ghost Stories (Blue Öyster Cult album) =

Studio album by Blue Öyster Cult
- Released: April 12, 2024
- Recorded: 1978–1983, 2016 ("If I Fell"), 2023-24 (overdubs)
- Genres: Hard rock; heavy metal
- Length: 41:40
- Label: Frontiers

Blue Öyster Cult chronology
The Symbol Remains (2020)	Ghost Stories (2024)

Singles from Ghost Stories
- 1. "So Supernatural" Released: February 7, 2024

Ghost Stories is the fifteenth and final studio album by American rock band Blue Öyster Cult, released on April 12, 2024.

== Recording ==
The album contains material recorded between the years 1978 and 1983, the exception being The Beatles cover "If I Fell" which was recorded in 2016. The songs were left out from the albums of the time for various reasons. Ghost Stories features the only studio recording of the band's live standard, "Kick Out the Jams". The album was "demixed and remixed" using artificial intelligence. The album was completed by recording new parts for the songs by the current line-up. "So Supernatural" was released as a single and was accompanied by a music video.

== Critical reception ==
Professional ratings
Review scores
Source	Rating
AllMusic	3.5/5 stars
Classic Rock (DE)	6/10
Inferno	4/5 stars
laut.de	3/5 stars
Metal Hammer (DE)	6.5/7
Spectrum Culture	69%
Spill Magazine	4/5 stars

AllMusic said: "The end result is a somewhat disjointed, but entirely enjoyable collection of songs that sound plucked from different eras and transported via time machine to 2024." Ultimate Classic Rock wrote: "[...] it's often not hard to hear why many of these songs remained unreleased, the once-shelved songs are nonetheless a welcome addition to the catalog." Spectrum Magazine summarized: "It’s very likeable, mostly not essential, but occasionally great." Spill Magazine said the album is full of great songs and the album is on par with other albums by the band.

== Track listing ==
Ghost Stories track listing
No.	Title	Writer(s)	Length
1.	"Late Night Street Fight"	Eric Bloom, Joe Bouchard	3:26
2.	"Cherry"	Donald Roeser, Bruce Abbott	2:38
3.	"So Supernatural"	J. Bouchard	5:55
4.	"We Gotta Get Out of This Place" (The Animals cover)	Barry Mann, Cynthia Weil	3:58
5.	"Soul Jive"	Albert Bouchard, Patti Smith	2:58
6.	"Gun"	J. Bouchard, Helen Wheels	4:27
7.	"Shot in the Dark"	A. Bouchard, Caryn Bouchard	3:26
8.	"The Only Thing"	A. Bouchard	4:04
9.	"Kick Out the Jams" (MC5 cover)	Wayne Kramer, Fred Smith, Rob Tyner, Michael Davis, Dennis Thompson	2:22
10.	"Money Machine"	J. Bouchard	2:43
11.	"Don't Come Running to Me"	Bloom, Greg Winter	3:27
12.	"If I Fell" (The Beatles cover)	John Lennon, Paul McCartney	2:16
13.	"Roadhouse Blues" (Japanese bonus track)	Jim Morrison, Robby Krieger, Ray Manzarek, John Densmore

== Personnel ==
- Eric Bloom – lead (tracks 1, 4, 7, 9, 11) & backing vocals, guitar, keyboards
- Buck Dharma – lead guitar, lead (2, 8, 12) & backing vocals
- Joe Bouchard – bass, guitar, keyboards, percussion, lead (3, 6, 10) & backing vocals
- Albert Bouchard – drums, lead (5) & backing vocals
- Allen Lanier – keyboards, guitar
- Rick Downey – drums (3, 11)
- Richie Castellano – additional guitar, keyboards, vocals
- Kasim Sulton – bass and backing vocals ("If I Fell")

== Charts ==
Chart (2024)	Peak position
French Albums (SNEP)	132
German Albums (Offizielle Top 100)	94
Swiss Albums (Schweizer Hitparade)	36
UK Independent Albums (Official Charts)	23
US Top Album Sales (Billboard)	24
