= God forbid =

God forbid is an idiom meaning "I hope it does not happen". Other uses may include:

- God Forbid, American metal band

== See also ==
- Heaven Forbid, a 1998 studio album by Blue Öyster Cult
