= Secret Treaties =

Studio album by Blue Öyster Cult
- Released: April 5, 1974
- Recorded: 1974
- Studios: Columbia 30th Street Studio (New York City)
- Genres: Hard rock; heavy metal; psychedelic rock
- Length: 38:14
- Label: Columbia
- Producers: Murray Krugman; Sandy Pearlman

Blue Öyster Cult chronology
Tyranny and Mutation (1973)	Secret Treaties (1974)	On Your Feet or on Your Knees (1975)

Singles from Secret Treaties
- 1. "Career of Evil" Released: 1974; 2. "Flaming Telepaths" Released: 1974

Professional ratings
Review scores
Source	Rating
AllMusic	4.5/5 stars
Christgau's Record Guide	B
Classic Rock	4.5/5 stars
Collector's Guide to Heavy Metal	10/10
Tom Hull	B
Rolling Stone	(favorable)

Secret Treaties is the third studio album by American rock band Blue Öyster Cult, released on April 5, 1974 by Columbia. It features the same band members and production team as their previous album.

The album spent 14 weeks in the US album charts, peaking at No. 53. It was certified gold by the RIAA in 1992.

In 1975, a poll of readers of the British magazine Melody Maker voted Secret Treaties the "Top Rock Album of All Time". In 2010, Rhapsody called it one of the all-time best "proto-metal" albums.

It is the only BÖC album that does not feature a track with lead vocals sung by guitarist Donald "Buck Dharma" Roeser. The band also did not write any of the lyrics to the album, handing that duty to producer Sandy Pearlman, rock critic Richard Meltzer and singer Patti Smith.

== Cover art ==
The cover, with art by Ron Lesser, depicts the band standing beside and sitting on a German Me 262 fighter aircraft; this scene is inspired by the song of the same name.

While the LP cover has the band name in red (a darker red on the Japanese LP), on the CD it is in lime green.

== Songs ==
Lyrics to the lead-off track "Career of Evil" were written by future punk poet Patti Smith, a longtime contributor to the band (and, at the time, girlfriend of BÖC keyboardist and rhythm guitarist Allen Lanier).

A few changes were made to "Career of Evil" on the single version. The vocals are different: only Eric Bloom is heard for most of the song, instead of Bloom and Albert Bouchard singing together. Also, one verse was removed ("Pay me..." to "...kneeling in the rain"). Part of the bridge was changed also, presumably to make the song more acceptable to radio: "do it to your daughter" became "do it like you ought to." The line "I want your wife to be my baby tonight" was changed to "I want your life to be mine, maybe tonight".

The transition between the tracks "Harvester of Eyes" and "Flaming Telepaths" is marked by a piece of classical music played on a music box. Members of the band recall that it was something the sound engineer had found on an unlabeled recording, but they could not identify it. The piece and its composer were uncredited on the album. It has since been identified as an excerpt from a waltz by Ion Ivanovici called Waves of the Danube (Donauwellen). The source of the original recording remains a mystery.

"Career of Evil" was the inspiration for the title of the 2015 novel of the same name written by J.K. Rowling under the pen name Robert Galbraith.

The compilation Don't Fear the Reaper: The Best of Blue Öyster Cult contains a version of "Flaming Telepaths" without the music box intro. The original version with the complete sound effects is found on the compilation Workshop of the Telescopes.

The psychedelic folk group Espers covers "Flaming Telepaths" on their CD The Weed Tree in 2005.

== Release history ==
In addition to the conventional 2 channel stereo version, the album was also released in a 4 channel quadraphonic version in 1974. The quad mix appeared on both LP record and 8-track tape. The quad LP release was encoded in the SQ matrix system.

The album was reissued on the Super Audio CD format in 2016 by Audio Fidelity. This edition contains both the stereo and quad mixes.

== Accolades ==
Publication	Country	Accolade	Year	Rank
NME	UK	Albums of the Year	1974	13
Dave Marsh & Kevin Stein	U.S.	The Best of the Album Chartmakers by Year: 1974	1981	36
Kerrang!	UK	The 100 Greatest Heavy Metal Albums of All Time	1989	22
Mojo	UK	Mojo 1000 - The Ultimate CD Buyers Guide	2001	No order
Rolling Stone	U.S.	The 50 Coolest Records of All Time	2002	47

== Track listing ==
All lyrics are written by Sandy Pearlman, except where noted; All lead vocals by Eric Bloom, except where noted.

Side one
No.	Title	Lyrics	Music	Lead vocals	Length
1.	"Career of Evil"	Patti Smith	Albert Bouchard	Bloom, A. Bouchard	3:59
2.	"Subhuman"		Bloom		4:39
3.	"Dominance and Submission"		Bloom, A. Bouchard	A. Bouchard	5:23
4.	"ME 262"		Bloom, Donald Roeser		4:48

Side two
No.	Title	Lyrics	Music	Lead vocals	Length
5.	"Cagey Cretins"	Richard Meltzer	A. Bouchard	Bloom, A. Bouchard, Joe Bouchard	3:16
6.	"Harvester of Eyes"	Meltzer	Bloom, Roeser		4:42
7.	"Flaming Telepaths"		Bloom, A. Bouchard, Roeser		5:20
8.	"Astronomy"		A. Bouchard, J. Bouchard		6:28

2001 CD remaster bonus tracks
No.	Title	Lyrics	Music	Lead vocals	Length
9.	"Boorman the Chauffeur" (outtake from the Secret Treaties sessions)	Joe Bouchard	Joe Bouchard, Murray Krugman	J. Bouchard	3:13
10.	"Mommy" (outtake from the Secret Treaties sessions)	Richard Meltzer	Eric Bloom		3:32
11.	"Mes Dames Sarat" (outtake from the Secret Treaties sessions)	Allen Lanier	Allen Lanier		4:07
12.	"Born to Be Wild" (non LP single)	Mars Bonfire	Mars Bonfire		3:40
13.	"Career of Evil" (single version)	Patti Smith	Albert Bouchard		3:00
Total length:					56:07

== Personnel ==
Band members

- Eric Bloom – vocals, stun guitar, keyboards
- Donald "Buck Dharma" Roeser – lead guitar
- Allen Lanier – keyboards, rhythm guitar, synthesizers, second lead guitar on track 11
- Joe Bouchard – bass, vocals
- Albert Bouchard – drums, vocals

Production

- Murray Krugman, Sandy Pearlman – producers
- Tim Geelan, Jerry Smith – engineers
- Lehman Yates, Lou Schlossberg – recording
- John Berg – cover design
- Bruce Dickinson – production (2001 remaster)
- Thom Cadley – mixing on tracks 10 and 11 (2001 remaster)
- Vic Anesini – remastering (2001 remaster)

== Charts ==
Chart (1974)	Peak position
Canada Top Albums/CDs (RPM)	54
US Billboard 200	53

== Certifications ==
Region	Certification	Certified units/sales
United States (RIAA)	Gold	500,000^{^}
^{^} Shipments figures based on certification alone.
