= Cult Classic =

Studio album by Blue Öyster Cult
- Released: June 1994
- Studios: Greene St. Recording, Baby Monster Studios, Giant Recording Studio, New York City
- Genres: Hard rock; heavy metal; psychedelic rock
- Length: 67:39
- Labels: Caroline; SPV
- Producers: Donald Roeser, Eric Bloom, Steve Schenck, Jeff Kawalek

Blue Öyster Cult chronology
Bad Channels (1992)	Cult Classic (1994)	Workshop of the Telescopes (1995)

Professional ratings
Review scores
Source	Rating
AllMusic	2/5 stars
Collector's Guide to Heavy Metal	8/10
Rolling Stone	3/5 stars

Cult Classic is a 1994 studio album by American rock band Blue Öyster Cult containing newly recorded versions of many of the band's most popular early songs. It was reissued by other labels under the titles Champions of Rock and E.T.I. Revisited in 1998 and 2004, with different artwork. A remastered version was released on January 24, 2020, by Frontiers Records.

== Track listing ==
No.	Title	Length
1.	"(Don't Fear) The Reaper"	5:05
2.	"E.T.I. (Extra Terrestrial Intelligence)"	5:13
3.	"ME 262"	3:08
4.	"This Ain't the Summer of Love"	2:43
5.	"Burning for You"	4:27
6.	"O.D.'d on Life Itself"	4:52
7.	"Flaming Telepaths"	6:06
8.	"Godzilla"	3:40
9.	"Astronomy"	8:45
10.	"Cities on Flame with Rock 'n' Roll"	4:06
11.	"Harvester of Eyes"	3:57
12.	"Buck's Boogie"	6:51
13.	"(Don't Fear) The Reaper" (TV Mix)	5:06
14.	"Godzilla" (TV Mix)	3:40

== Personnel ==
=== Band members ===
- Eric Bloom – lead vocals, stun guitar, keyboards, producer
- Donald 'Buck Dharma' Roeser – lead guitar, vocals, keyboards, producer
- Allen Lanier – keyboards, rhythm guitar, backing vocals
- Jon Rogers – bass, backing vocals
- Chuck Burgi – drums, percussion, backing vocals

=== Production ===
- Jeff Kawalek – associate producer, engineer
- Danny Madorski – engineer
- Mick Gormaley – digital editing
- Steve Schenck – executive producer
