= Extraterrestrial Live =

- Cover art by Greg Scott

Live album by Blue Öyster Cult
- Released: April 19, 1982
- Recorded: "Black & Blue" & "Fire of Unknown Origin US Tours, 1980–1981
- Genres: Hard rock, heavy metal
- Length: 78:06
- Label: Columbia
- Producers: Sandy Pearlman; George Geranios

Blue Öyster Cult chronology
| Fire of Unknown Origin (1981) | Extraterrestrial Live (1982) | The Revölution by Night (1983) |

Blue Öyster Cult live chronology
| Some Enchanted Evening (1978) | Extraterrestrial Live (1982) |

Singles from Extraterrestrial Live
- 1. "Burnin' for You" (live) / "(Don't Fear) The Reaper (live)" Released: June 1982

Professional ratings
Review scores
| Source | Rating |
|---|---|
| AllMusic | 3.5/5 stars |
| Collector's Guide to Heavy Metal | 7/10 |

Extraterrestrial Live is the third live album by American rock band Blue Öyster Cult, released in 1982 by Columbia Records. It primarily documents the band's 1981 tour in support of Fire of Unknown Origin, but also includes two tracks recorded in 1980 during the Mirrors Tour and the North American leg of Black Sabbath's Heaven & Hell Tour (dubbed The Black and Blue Tour). Midway through the 1981 Fire of Unknown Origin tour, the band fired drummer and founding member Albert Bouchard, replacing him with roadie Rick Downey.

== Track listing ==
Side one
| No. | Title | Writer(s) | Recorded at | Length |
|---|---|---|---|---|
| 1. | "Dominance and Submission" | Eric Bloom, Albert Bouchard, Sandy Pearlman | Mid-Hudson Civic Center, Poughkeepsie, New York, February 11, 1980 for a King Biscuit Flower Hour broadcast | 5:56 |
| 2. | "Cities on Flame with Rock and Roll" | Donald Roeser, A. Bouchard, Pearlman | Tower Theater, Philadelphia, December 31, 1981 | 5:19 |
| 3. | "Dr. Music" | Joe Bouchard, Roeser, Richard Meltzer | Nassau Coliseum, Long Island, New York, December 30, 1981 | 3:40 |
| 4. | "The Red and the Black" | Bloom, A. Bouchard, Pearlman | Hollywood Sportatorium, Pembroke Pines, Florida, October 9, 1981 | 4:39 |

Side two
| No. | Title | Writer(s) | Recorded at | Length |
|---|---|---|---|---|
| 5. | "Joan Crawford" | A. Bouchard, Jack Rigg, David Roter | Hollywood Sportatorium, Pembroke Pines, Florida, October 9, 1981 | 5:17 |
| 6. | "Burnin' for You" | Roeser, Meltzer | Hollywood Sportatorium, Pembroke Pines, Florida, October 9, 1981 | 4:50 |
| 7. | "Roadhouse Blues" (The Doors cover) | The Doors, Jim Morrison | The Country Club, Reseda, California, December 15, 1981 | 9:06 |

Side three
| No. | Title | Writer(s) | Recorded at | Length |
|---|---|---|---|---|
| 8. | "Black Blade" | Bloom, Michael Moorcock, John Trivers | Nassau Coliseum, Long Island, New York, October 17, 1980 | 6:17 |
| 9. | "Hot Rails to Hell" | J. Bouchard | Nassau Coliseum, Long Island, New York, December 30, 1981 | 5:03 |
| 10. | "Godzilla" | Roeser | Hollywood Sportatorium, Pembroke Pines, Florida, October 9, 1981 | 7:46 |

Side four
| No. | Title | Writer(s) | Recorded at | Length |
|---|---|---|---|---|
| 11. | "Veteran of the Psychic Wars" | Bloom, Moorcock | Hollywood Sportatorium, Pembroke Pines, Florida, October 9, 1981 | 8:11 |
| 12. | "E.T.I. (Extra Terrestrial Intelligence)" | Roeser, Pearlman | Hollywood Sportatorium, Pembroke Pines, Florida, October 9, 1981 | 5:20 |
| 13. | "(Don't Fear) The Reaper" | Roeser | Hollywood Sportatorium, Pembroke Pines, Florida, October 9, 1981 | 6:42 |

== Personnel ==
Band members

- Eric Bloom – lead vocals on tracks 1–5, 7–8, 10–12, stun guitar, keyboards
- Donald "Buck Dharma" Roeser – lead guitar, lead vocals on tracks 6, 13
- Allen Lanier – keyboards, guitar
- Joe Bouchard – bass, lead vocals on track 9
- Rick Downey – drums on tracks 2–7, 9–13
- Albert Bouchard – drums on "Dominance and Submission" and "Black Blade"

Additional musicians

- Robby Krieger – guitar on "Roadhouse Blues"

Production

- Sandy Pearlman – producer, management
- George Geranios – producer, live sound, engineer, mixing
- Paul Mandl – assistant engineer, editor
- Rod O'Brien, Deve Hewitt – live recording engineers
- Paul Stubblebine – mastering

== Charts ==
| Chart (1982) | Peak position |
|---|---|
| Canada Top Albums/CDs (RPM) | 37 |
| UK Albums (Official Charts) | 39 |
| US Billboard 200 | 29 |
