= Bad Channels (album) =

Soundtrack album by Blue Öyster Cult
- Released: August 4, 1992
- Recorded: Alpha & Omega Recording, San Rafael, California, 1992
- Genres: Heavy metal; punk rock; film score
- Length: 71:20
- Label: Moonstone Records
- Producers: Donald Roeser; Eric Bloom; Steve Schenk; Mark Nawara (Sykotik Sinfoney); Joker; John Bogosian (Fair Game); Sandy Pearlman (DMT)

Blue Öyster Cult chronology
Imaginos (1988)	Bad Channels (1992)	Cult Classic (1994)

Professional ratings
Review scores
Source	Rating
AllMusic	2/5 stars

Bad Channels is the soundtrack album of the science fiction spoof film of the same name, released in 1992. It features ten songs by the bands Blue Öyster Cult, Joker, Fair Game (with Ron Keel), Sykotik Sinfoney and DMT and a film score written and performed by Blue Öyster Cult.

== Critical reception ==
AllMusic said: "There's a lot of music here [...] but little of it is memorable." Louder Sound called the album "a grotesque mistake from Blue Öyster Cult."

== Track listing ==
Featured songs
No.	Title	Writer(s)	Original artist	Length
1.	"Demon's Kiss"	Eric Bloom, Donald Roeser, John Shirley	Blue Öyster Cult	3:53
2.	"The Horsemen Arrive"	Bloom, Roeser, Shirley	Blue Öyster Cult	6:12
3.	"That's How It Is"		Joker	3:07
4.	"Jane Jane (The Hurricane)"		Joker	3:03
5.	"Somewhere in the Night"		Fair Game	4:30
6.	"Blind Faith"		Fair Game	4:24
7.	"Manic Depresso"		Sykotik Sinfoney	4:03
8.	"Mr. Cool"		Sykotik Sinfoney	3:38
9.	"Myth of Freedom"		DMT	5:07
10.	"Touching Myself Again"		DMT	3:59
11.	"Little Old Lady Polka"		The Ukelaliens	3:04

Original score by Blue Öyster Cult
No.	Title	Length
1.	"Bad Channels Overture"	2:01
2.	"Power Station"	2:02
3.	"Power Station II"	1:38
4.	"Shadow"	0:26
5.	"V.U."	0:52
6.	"Cosmo Rules, but Lump Controls"	1:09
7.	"Battering Ram"	1:25
8.	"This Dude Is F****d"	2:24
9.	"Pick Up Her Feed"	1:53
10.	"Spray That Scumbag"	1:54
11.	"Out of Station"	1:22
12.	"Tree Full of Owls"	1:08
13.	"Cookie in Bottle"	0:40
14.	"Corky Gets It"	1:01
15.	"Eulogy for Corky"	0:43
16.	"Spore Bomb"	1:06
17.	"Remodeling"	2:14
18.	"Ginger Snaps"	1:35
19.	"Moon Gets It"	0:39

== Personnel ==
Blue Öyster Cult

- Eric Bloom – vocals, guitar, keyboards
- Donald 'Buck Dharma' Roeser – lead guitar, vocals, keyboards
- Allen Lanier – guitar, keyboards
- Jon Rogers – bass, background vocals
- Chuck Burgi – drums, background vocals

== Additional notes ==
Catalogue: (CD) Moonstone 12936
