= Helen Wheels (musician) =

New York punk musician

Helen Wheels (born Helen Robbins; 6 May 1949 – 17 January 2000) was an American singer and songwriter. She was from a Jewish family. During the 1970s she was involved with punk in New York and got the name Helen Wheels from Handsome Dick Manitoba of The Dictators. She was lead singer of the Helen Wheels Band, and also wrote several lyrics for songs by Blue Öyster Cult. In 1981 she became a bodybuilder. Robert Crumb was a friend of hers and drew the album cover for her 1998 compilation album "Archetype". She died in 2000 at the age of 50, after developing an infection following back surgery.
