= Blue Öyster Cult =

American rock band

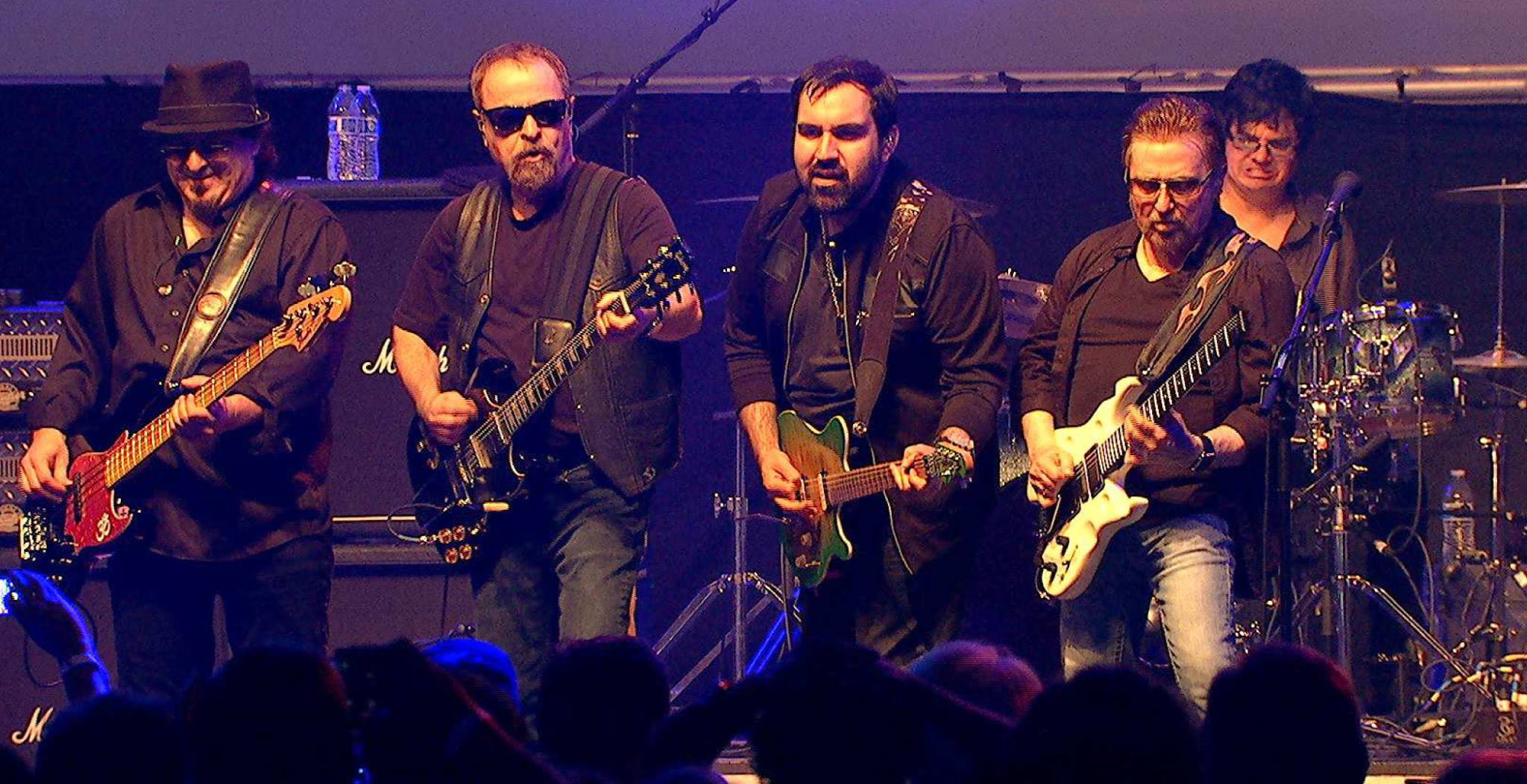
- Blue Öyster Cult performing in 2017 (Left to right: Danny Miranda, Eric Bloom, Richie Castellano, Buck Dharma, Jules Radino)

Background information
- Also known as: Soft White Underbelly (1967–1969); Oaxaca (1970); Stalk-Forrest Group (1970); Santos Sisters (1970)
- Origin: Stony Brook, New York, U.S.
- Genres: Hard rock; heavy metal; progressive rock; occult rock; psychedelic rock (early); acid rock (early); pop rock (1980s)
- Works: Discography
- Years active: 1967–1986; 1987–present
- Labels: Columbia; CMC; Frontiers
- Members: Buck Dharma; Eric Bloom; Danny Miranda; Richie Castellano; Jules Radino
- Past members: Albert Bouchard Allen Lanier Joe Bouchard; See members article for others.
- Website: blueoystercult.com

Blue Öyster Cult (/ˈɔɪstər/ OY-ster; sometimes abbreviated BÖC or BOC) is an American rock band formed in Stony Brook, Long Island in 1967. They have sold 25 million records worldwide, including 7 million in the United States. Their fusion of hard rock with psychedelia and penchant for occult, fantastical and tongue-in-cheek lyrics had a major influence on heavy metal music. They developed a cult following and enjoyed mainstream success with "(Don't Fear) The Reaper" (1976), "Godzilla" (1977) and "Burnin' for You" (1981), which remain classic rock radio staples. They were early adopters of the music video format, and their videos were in heavy rotation on MTV in its early period.

Blue Öyster Cult continued making studio albums and touring throughout the 1980s, although their popularity had declined such that they were dropped from their longtime label CBS/Columbia Records, following the commercial failure of their 11th studio album Imaginos (1988). Other than contributing to the soundtrack of the 1992 film Bad Channels and an album of re-recorded material, Cult Classic, in 1994, the band continued as a live act until releasing its first studio album of original material in 10 years, Heaven Forbid (1998). The lackluster sales of its follow-up Curse of the Hidden Mirror (2001) led to another hiatus from studio recording, but they continued performing live. Two more studio albums were released in the 2020s, The Symbol Remains (2020) and Ghost Stories (2024), the latter of which is said to be the band's last.

Blue Öyster Cult's longest-lasting and most commercially successful lineup included Donald "Buck Dharma" Roeser (lead guitar, vocals), Eric Bloom (lead vocals, "stun guitar", keyboards, synthesizer), Allen Lanier (keyboards, rhythm guitar), Joe Bouchard (bass, vocals, keyboards), and Albert Bouchard (drums, percussion, vocals, miscellaneous instruments). The band's current lineup includes Bloom and Roeser, in addition to Danny Miranda (bass, backing vocals), Richie Castellano (keyboards, rhythm guitar, backing vocals), and Jules Radino (drums, percussion). The duo of the band's manager Sandy Pearlman and rock critic Richard Meltzer, who also met at Stony Brook University, played a key role in writing many of the band's lyrics.

== History ==
=== Early years as Soft White Underbelly (1967–1971) ===
Blue Öyster Cult was formed in 1967 as Soft White Underbelly (a name the group would occasionally use in the 1970s and 1980s to play small club gigs around the United States and UK) in a communal house at Stony Brook University on Long Island when rock critic Sandy Pearlman overheard a jam session consisting of fellow Stony Brook classmate Donald Roeser and his friends. Pearlman offered to become the band's manager and creative partner, to which the band agreed. The band's original lineup consisted of guitarist Roeser, drummer Albert Bouchard, keyboardist Allen Lanier and bassist Andrew Winters.

In October 1967, the band made its debut performance as Steve Noonan's backing band at the Stony Brook University Gymnasium, a gig booked by Pearlman. The band's name came from Winston Churchill's description of Italy as "the soft underbelly of the Axis."

Pearlman was important to the band – he was able to get them gigs and recording contracts with Elektra and Columbia, and he provided them with his poetry for use as lyrics for many of their songs, including "Astronomy." Writer Richard Meltzer, also a Stony Brook University student, provided the band with lyrics from their early days up through their most recent studio album. In 1968, the band moved in together at their first house in the Thomaston area of Great Neck, New York. The band recorded an album's worth of material for Elektra Records in 1968.

Braunstein played his final show as Soft White Underbelly's lead singer in the spring of 1969. His departure led Elektra to shelve the album recorded with him on vocals.

Eric Bloom was hired by the band as their acoustic engineer. He eventually replaced Braunstein as lead singer through a series of unlikely coincidences, one being Lanier deciding to join Bloom on a drive to an upstate gig, where he spent the night with Bloom's old college bandmates and got to hear old tapes of Bloom's talent as lead vocalist. Because of this, Bloom was offered the job of lead singer for Soft White Underbelly.

However, a bad review of a 1969 Fillmore East show caused Pearlman to change the name of the band – first to Oaxaca, then to the Stalk-Forrest Group. Pearlman also gave stage names to each of the band members (Jesse Python for Eric Bloom, Buck Dharma for Donald Roeser, Andy Panda for Andy Winters, Prince Omega for Albert Bouchard, La Verne for Allen Lanier) but only Buck Dharma kept his. The band recorded yet another album's worth of material for Elektra, but only one single, "What Is Quicksand?" b/w "Arthur Comics", was released (and only in a promo edition of 300 copies) on Elektra Records (this album was eventually released, with additional outtakes, by Rhino Handmade Records as St. Cecilia: The Elektra Recordings in 2001). The album featured Bloom as their main lead singer, but Roeser also sang lead on a few songs, a pattern of sharing lead vocals that has continued throughout the band's career. With Bloom, Soft White Underbelly/Stalk-Forrest Group became one of Stony Brook University's "house bands," popular on campus.

After a few more temporary band names, including the Santos Sisters, the band settled on Blue Öyster Cult in 1971 (see below for its origin).

New York City producer/composer and jingle writer David Lucas saw the band perform and took them into his Warehouse Recording Studio and produced four demos, with which Pearlman was able to get the renamed band another audition with Columbia Records. Clive Davis liked what he heard, and signed the band to the label. The first album was subsequently produced and recorded by Lucas on eight-track at Lucas' studio. Winters would leave the band and be replaced by Bouchard's brother, Joe Bouchard.

=== Black-and-white years (1971–1975) ===
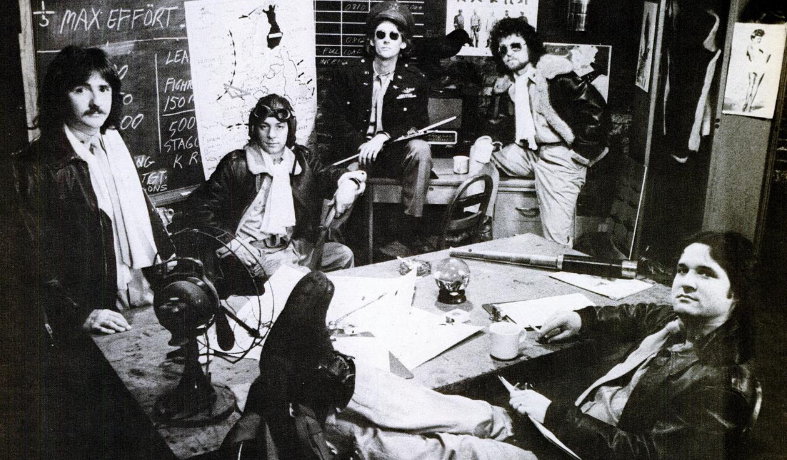
Billboard ad, 1974

Their debut album Blue Öyster Cult was released in January 1972, with a black-and-white cover designed by artist Bill Gawlik. The album featured the songs "Cities on Flame with Rock and Roll", "Stairway to the Stars", and "Then Came the Last Days of May". By this time, the band's sound had become more oriented toward hard rock, but songs like "She's as Beautiful as a Foot" and "Redeemed" also showed a strong element of the band's psychedelic roots. Pearlman wanted the group to be the American answer to Black Sabbath. All of the band members except for Allen Lanier sang lead, a pattern that would continue on many subsequent albums, although lead singer Eric Bloom sang the majority of the songs. The album sold well, and Blue Öyster Cult toured with artists such as the Byrds, Mahavishnu Orchestra and Alice Cooper. As the band toured, its sound became heavier and more direct.

Tyranny and Mutation (1973), was written while the band was on tour for their debut album. It contained songs such as "The Red and the Black" (an ode to the Royal Canadian Mounted Police, a rewrite of "I'm on the Lamb But I Ain't No Sheep" from their debut album, and also a reference to the novel of the same name by Stendhal), "Hot Rails to Hell" and "Baby Ice Dog", the first of the band's many collaborations with Patti Smith. It featured a harder-rocking approach than before, although the band's songs were also growing more complex. The album outsold its predecessor, a trend that would continue with their next few albums.

Secret Treaties (1974), received positive reviews, featuring songs such as "Career of Evil" (co-written by Smith), "Dominance and Submission" and "Astronomy". As a result of constant touring, the band was now capable of headlining shows. The album continued their upward sales trend, and would eventually go gold.

As their first three albums all had black-and-white covers, fans and critics have dubbed this formative period the "black and white years".

=== Commercial success (1975–1981) ===
The band's first live album, On Your Feet or on Your Knees (1975), achieved greater success and went gold. Its success gave the band more time to work on a follow-up. The band members were able to purchase home recording equipment to record demos for their next album.

Agents of Fortune (1976), was their first album to go platinum and was again produced by David Lucas. It contained the hit single "(Don't Fear) The Reaper", which reached number 12 on the Billboard charts and has become a classic. Other major songs on the album were "(This Ain't) The Summer of Love", "E.T.I. (Extra-Terrestrial Intelligence)" and "The Revenge of Vera Gemini". Having recorded demos of the songs at home before recording the album, the band's songwriting process had become more individual, with none of the songs featuring the collaborative writing between the band members that had been common on their earlier albums. Although the album still featured their trademark hard rock with sinister lyrics, the songs had become more conventional in structure, and the production was more polished. For the first and only time, the album featured lead vocals from all five band members, with Allen Lanier singing lead on the song "True Confessions." With Albert Bouchard singing lead on three songs and Joe Bouchard and Donald Roeser singing lead on one each, Eric Bloom ended up taking the lead on only four of the album's ten songs.

For the tour, the band added lasers to their light show, for which they became known. They were among the first acts to use lasers in performance.

Spectres (1977), had the FM radio hit "Godzilla", "I Love the Night" and "Goin' Through the Motions". However, its sales were not as strong as the previous album, going gold but not platinum, becoming their first album to sell less than its predecessor. It featured even more polished production, and continued the trend of the lead vocals extensively shared between members, although Allen Lanier did not sing lead. As with the previous album, Eric Bloom sang lead on fewer than half the songs.

Some Enchanted Evening (1978) was another live album. Although it was intended as another double-live album in the vein of On Your Feet or on Your Knees, Columbia insisted that it be edited down to single-album length. It was a resounding commercial success, becoming Blue Öyster Cult's most popular album and eventually selling over two million copies. It also revealed that while the band's studio work was becoming increasingly polished, they were still very much a hard rock band on stage.

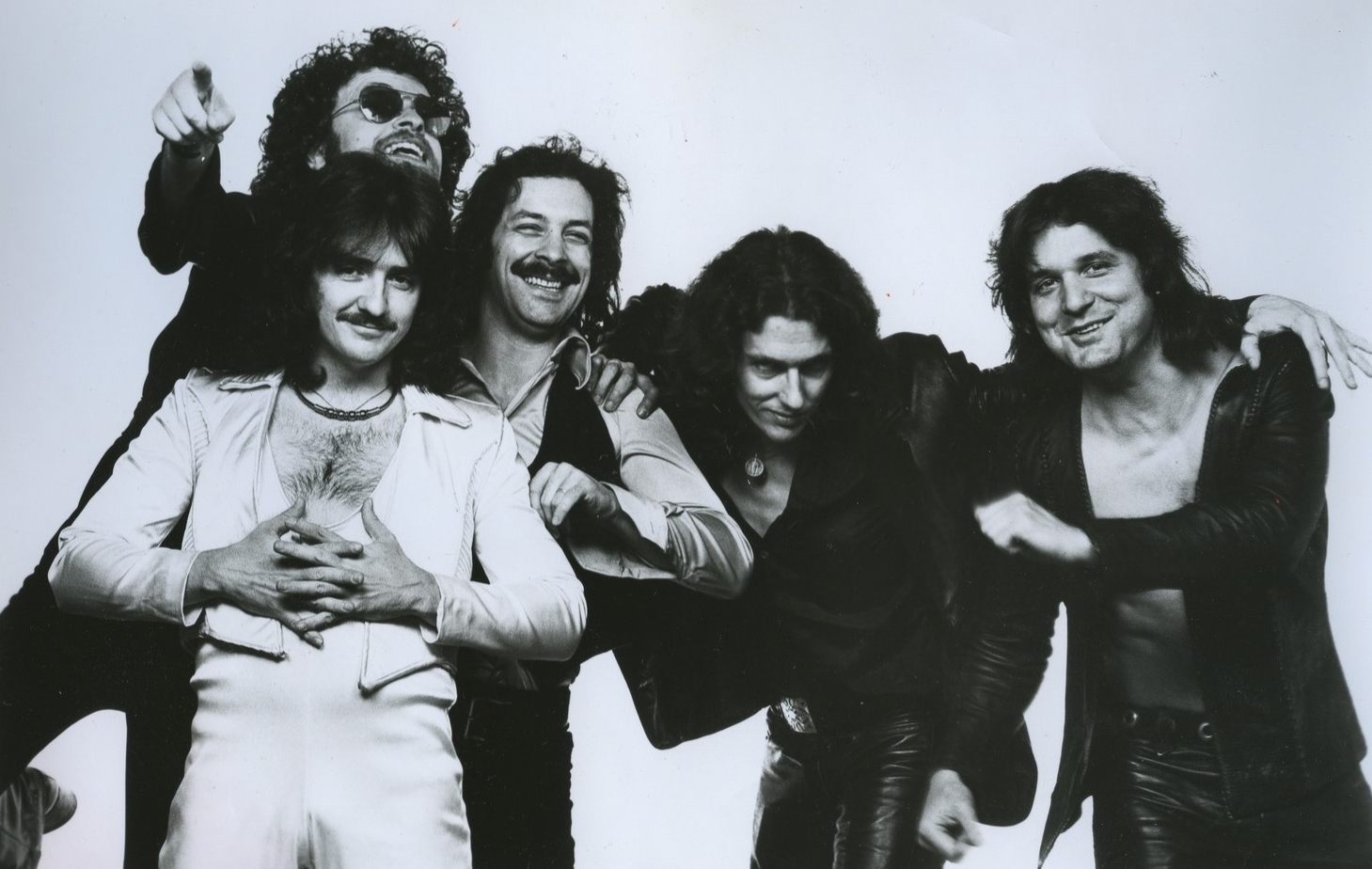
1977 publicity photo with the 1971–1981 lineup, L–R: Donald "Buck Dharma" Roeser (bottom); Eric Bloom; Albert Bouchard; Allen Lanier; Joe Bouchard

It was followed by the studio album Mirrors (1979). For Mirrors, instead of working with previous producers Sandy Pearlman (who instead went on to manage Black Sabbath) and Murray Krugman, Blue Öyster Cult chose Tom Werman, who had worked with acts such as Cheap Trick and Ted Nugent. It featured the band's glossiest production to date. It also gave Roeser, the lead vocalist on the band's biggest hits, bigger prominence as a vocalist, singing lead on four of the nine songs. However, the resulting album sales were disappointing.

Pearlman's association with Black Sabbath led to Sabbath's producer Martin Birch being hired for the next Blue Öyster Cult record. The album found the band returning to their hard rock roots, and although both of the Bouchard brothers and guitarist Roeser all got lead vocal turns, Bloom would sing the majority of the tracks. The result was positive, with Cultösaurus Erectus (1980) receiving good reviews. The album went to number 12 in the United Kingdom, but did not do as well in the United States. The song "Black Blade", which was written by Bloom with lyrics by science fiction and fantasy author Michael Moorcock, is a kind of retelling of Moorcock's epic Elric of Melniboné saga. The band also did a co-headlining tour with Black Sabbath in support of the album, calling the tour "Black and Blue".

Birch produced the band's next album, Fire of Unknown Origin (1981), which peaked at number 24 on the Billboard 200, becoming the band's highest-charting album. The biggest hit on this album was the Top 40 hit "Burnin' for You," a song Roeser had written with a Richard Meltzer lyric. He had intended to use it on his solo album, Flat Out (1982), but he was convinced to use it on the Blue Öyster Cult album instead. The revival of the band's heavier sound continued, albeit with fairly heavy use of synthesizers and some noticeable New Wave influence on a few tracks. It contained other fan favorites such as "Joan Crawford" (inspired by the book and film Mommie Dearest) and "Veteran of the Psychic Wars", another song co-written by Moorcock. Several of the songs had been written for the animated film Heavy Metal, but only "Veteran of the Psychic Wars" (which had not been written for Heavy Metal) was actually used in the movie. The album marked a strong commercial resurgence for the band and achieved gold status, their first studio album since Spectres to do so.

During the Fire of Unknown Origin tour , Bouchard had a falling out with the others and left the band, and Rick Downey (formerly the band's lighting designer) replaced him on drums. This marked the end of the band's original and best-known lineup.

=== Declining popularity (1982–1989) ===
After leaving the band, Albert Bouchard spent five years working on a solo album based on Sandy Pearlman's poem "Imaginos". Blue Öyster Cult also released their third live album, Extraterrestrial Live, in 1982. The band then went to the studio for the next album, The Revölution by Night (1983), with Bruce Fairbairn as producer. After two albums of a return to a harder rocking sound, the band adopted a more radio-friendly, AOR-oriented sound with Fairbairn providing a 1980s-style production. This approach met with some success, especially on its highest-charting single, Roeser's "Shooting Shark", co-written by Patti Smith and featuring Randy Jackson on bass, which reached number 83 on the charts. Bloom's "Take Me Away" achieved some FM radio play. However, the album didn't match sales of its predecessor, failed to achieve gold status, and marked the beginning of the band's second commercial decline. After touring for Revölution, Rick Downey left, leaving Blue Öyster Cult without a drummer.

Blue Öyster Cult re-united with Bouchard for a California tour in February 1985, infamously known as the 'Albert Returns' Tour. This arrangement was only temporary and caused more tensions between the band and Bouchard, since he had thought he would be staying on permanently, which was not the case. The band had intended to use him only as a fill-in until another drummer could come on board, which resulted in Bouchard's leaving after the tour. Allen Lanier also quit the band shortly thereafter, leaving them without a keyboardist and with only three remaining original members. This incarnation of the band would sometimes be referred to as '3ÖC' by fans, a pun on the number of original members left.

Blue Öyster Cult hired drummer Jimmy Wilcox and keyboardist Tommy Zvoncheck to finish the album Club Ninja, which was poorly received, with only "Dancin' in the Ruins," one of several songs on the record written entirely by outside songwriters, enjoying minimal success on radio and MTV. The best-known original on the album is "Perfect Water" written by Dharma and Jim Carroll. While the band members have generally been disparaging about the album, Bouchard has stated that "Perfect Water" is "perfect genius".

The band toured in Germany, after which bassist Bouchard left, leaving only two members of the classic lineup: Bloom and Roeser. Some people referred to the band as "Two Öyster Cult" during this period. Jon Rogers was hired to replace Joe and this version of the band finished out the 1986 tour. After it wound up that year, the band took a temporary break from recording and touring. When Blue Öyster Cult received an offer to tour in Greece in the early summer of 1987, the band reformed. Wilcox quit while Zvoncheck was fired for making excessive financial demands. Allen Lanier then was offered to rejoin and agreed, so the new line-up now featured three founding members, along with Jon Rogers returning on bass and Ron Riddle as their newest drummer.

Columbia Records was not interested in releasing the Imaginos project as an Albert Bouchard solo album so it was arranged for the record to be released in 1988 by Columbia as a Blue Öyster Cult album, with some new lead vocal overdubs from Bloom and Roeser and lead guitar overdubs from Roeser. These replaced most of Bouchard's lead vocals, as well as many lead guitar parts that had been recorded by session musicians. Bouchard and Lanier had earlier contributed some minor keyboard and backing vocal parts to the album, allowing all five original members to be credited. The album did not sell well (despite a positive review in Rolling Stone) and although the then-current Blue Öyster Cult lineup (minus both Bouchard brothers) toured to promote Imaginos, promotion by the label was virtually non-existent. Most songs from the album have not been performed live by the band since at least 1989. When Columbia Records' parent company CBS Records was purchased by Sony and became Sony Music Entertainment, Blue Öyster Cult were dropped from the label.

=== First studio hiatus, Heaven Forbid and Curse of the Hidden Mirror (1990–2003) ===
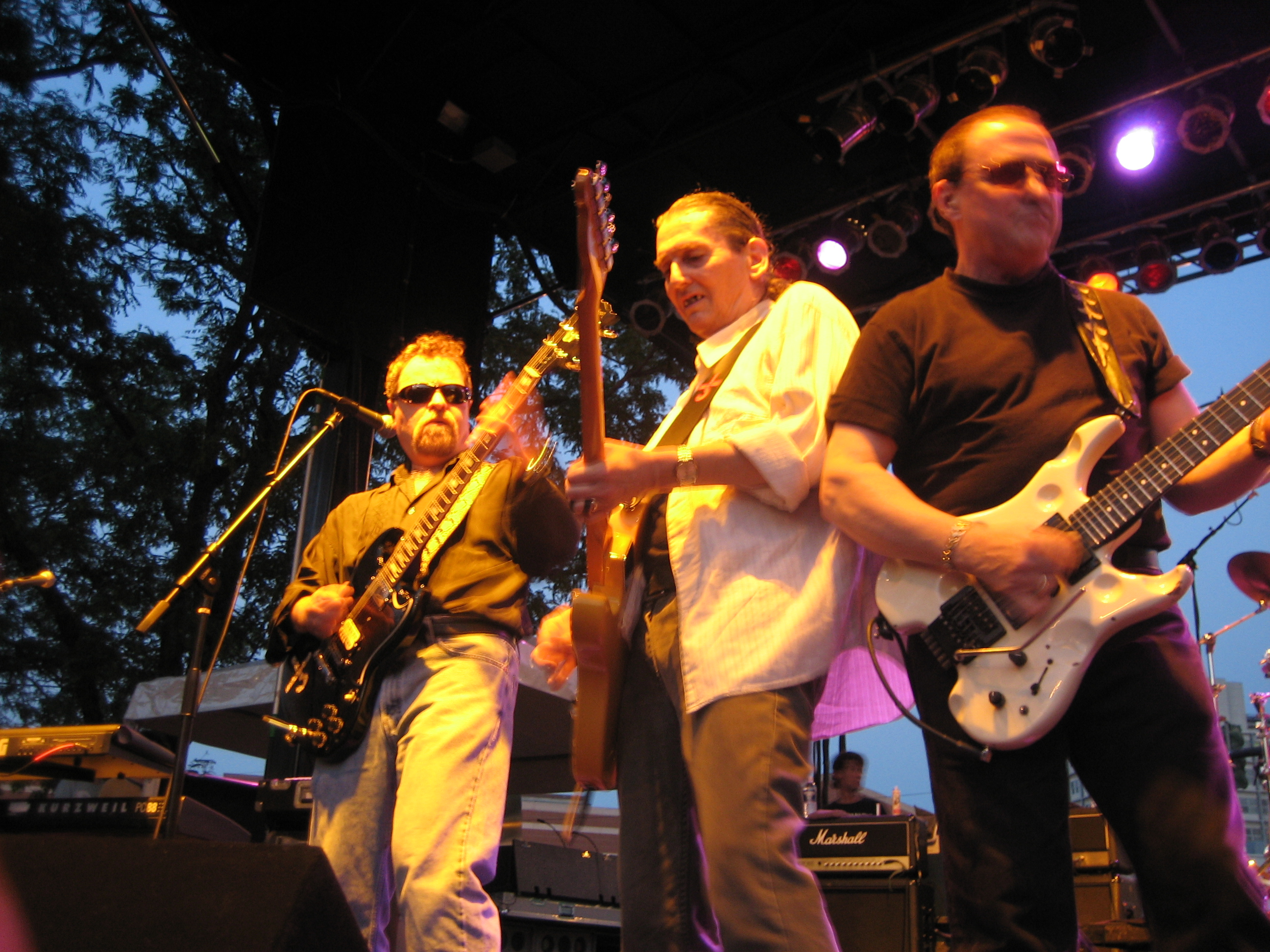
Blue Öyster Cult live in 2006

The band spent most of the 1990s touring without releasing an album of new material, although they did contribute two new songs to the Bad Channels movie soundtrack, released in 1992, and also released an album of re-recorded songs from the band's original lineup, called Cult Classic, in 1994. During these years, while the three original members remained constant, there were several changes in the band's rhythm section. Ron Riddle quit in 1991 and was followed by a series of other drummers including Chuck Burgi (1991–1992, 1992–1995, 1996–1997), John Miceli (1992, 1995), John O'Reilly (1995–1996) and Bobby Rondinelli (1997–2004). As for the bass position, Rogers left in 1995, and was replaced by Danny Miranda.

In the late 1990s, Blue Öyster Cult secured a recording contract with CMC Records (later purchased by Sanctuary Records), and continued to tour frequently. Two studio albums were released, Heaven Forbid (1998) and Curse of the Hidden Mirror (2001). Both albums featured songs co-written by cyberpunk/horror novelist John Shirley. The first mostly featured Miranda on bass and Burgi on drums, although a few tracks feature earlier bassist Jon Rogers and one track features Rondinelli on drums, who had joined the band near the end of the recording. Curse of the Hidden Mirror features Miranda and Rondinelli as the rhythm section, and the pair contributed to the songwriting as well. Neither album sold well.

In 2001, Sony/Columbia's reissue arm, Legacy Records issued expanded versions of the first four Blue Öyster Cult studio albums, including some previously unreleased demos and outtakes from album sessions, live recordings (from the Live 72 EP), and post-St. Cecilia tunes from the Stalk-Forrest Group era.

Another live record and DVD A Long Day's Night followed in 2002, both drawn from one concert in Chicago. It also featured the Bloom, Roeser, Lanier, Miranda, Rondinelli lineup.

=== Live-only activities (2004–2016) ===
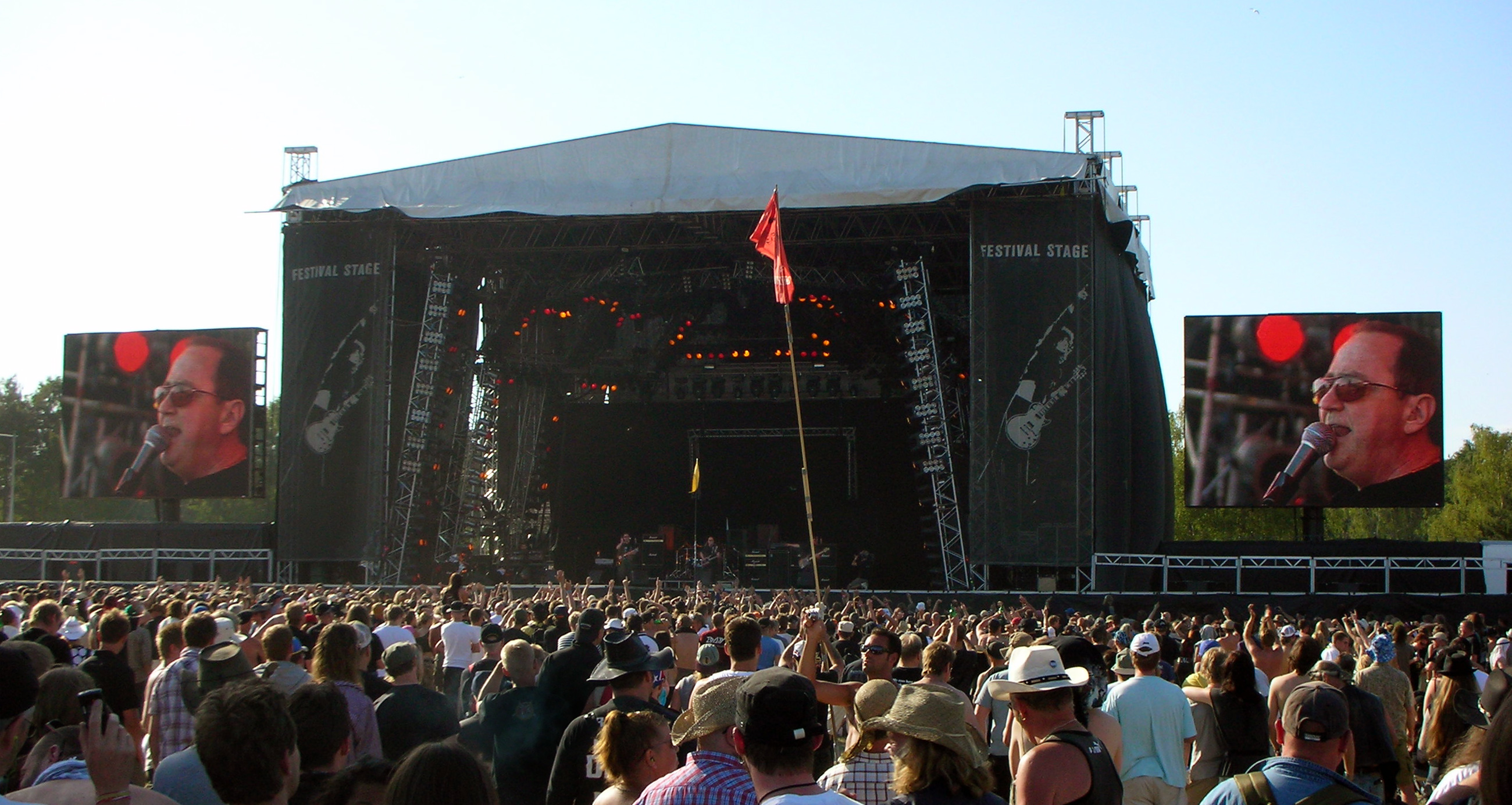
Blue Öyster Cult performing at the Sweden Rock Festival, 2008

Although the band's lineup had remained stable from 1997 to 2004, they began to experience personnel changes again in 2004. Rondinelli left in 2004, and was replaced by Jules Radino. Miranda left during the same year to become the bassist for Queen + Paul Rodgers in place of the retired John Deacon. He was replaced by Richie Castellano, who would also take occasional turns as a lead vocalist onstage.

Allen Lanier retired from live performances in 2007 after not appearing with the band since late 2006. Castellano switched to rhythm guitar and keyboards (Castellano also filled in on lead guitar and vocals for an ailing Buck Dharma in two shows in 2005), and the position of bassist was taken up by Rudy Sarzo (previously a member of Quiet Riot, Whitesnake, Ozzy Osbourne and Dio), with the band employing Danny Miranda and Jon Rogers as guest bassists to fill in when Sarzo was unavailable. Sarzo then joined as an official member of the band, although Rogers continued to occasionally fill in when Sarzo was busy.

In June 2012, the band announced that bassist Rudy Sarzo was leaving the band and was being replaced by former Utopia bassist Kasim Sulton.

In August of the same year, it was announced that Sony Legacy would be releasing a 17-disc boxed set entitled The Complete Columbia Albums Collection on October 30, 2012. The set includes the first round of the remastered series plus the long-awaited remastered versions of On Your Feet or on Your Knees, Mirrors, Cultösaurus Erectus, Fire of Unknown Origin, Extraterrestrial Live, The Revölution by Night, Club Ninja and Imaginos. Also exclusive to this set are two discs of rare and unreleased B-sides, demos and radio broadcasts.

Also in 2012, celebrating the 40th anniversary of Blue Öyster Cult, the then-current incarnation of the band reunited for the first time in 25 years with other original members Joe and Albert Bouchard and Allen Lanier as guests for a special event in New York.

Founding keyboardist/guitarist Allen Lanier died of chronic obstructive pulmonary disease on August 14, 2013.

In 2016, Albert Bouchard played again as guest with the then-current line-up of the band, playing at shows in New York, Los Angeles, Dublin and London, where they played Agents of Fortune in its entirety. The shows featured songs from Agents of Fortune that had either not been played live before ("True Confessions", "The Revenge of Vera Gemini", "Sinful Love", "Tenderloin", "Debbie Denise"), songs that had not been played since the album's debut tour ("Morning Final"), and songs that were no longer/never played frequently ("This Ain't the Summer of Love", "Tattoo Vampire"), as well as the fan favorite "Five Guitars", which had not been played since Albert initially left the band in 1981. Albert played in the following songs at the show: "The Revenge of Vera Gemini" (vocals, guitar), "Sinful Love" (vocals, guitar), "Tattoo Vampire" (guitar), "Morning Final" (guitar), "Tenderloin" (cymbals), "Debbie Denise" (vocals, acoustic guitar), "Cities on Flame with Rock and Roll" (vocals, drums), and "Five Guitars" (guitar).

=== The Symbol Remains and Ghost Stories (2017–present) ===
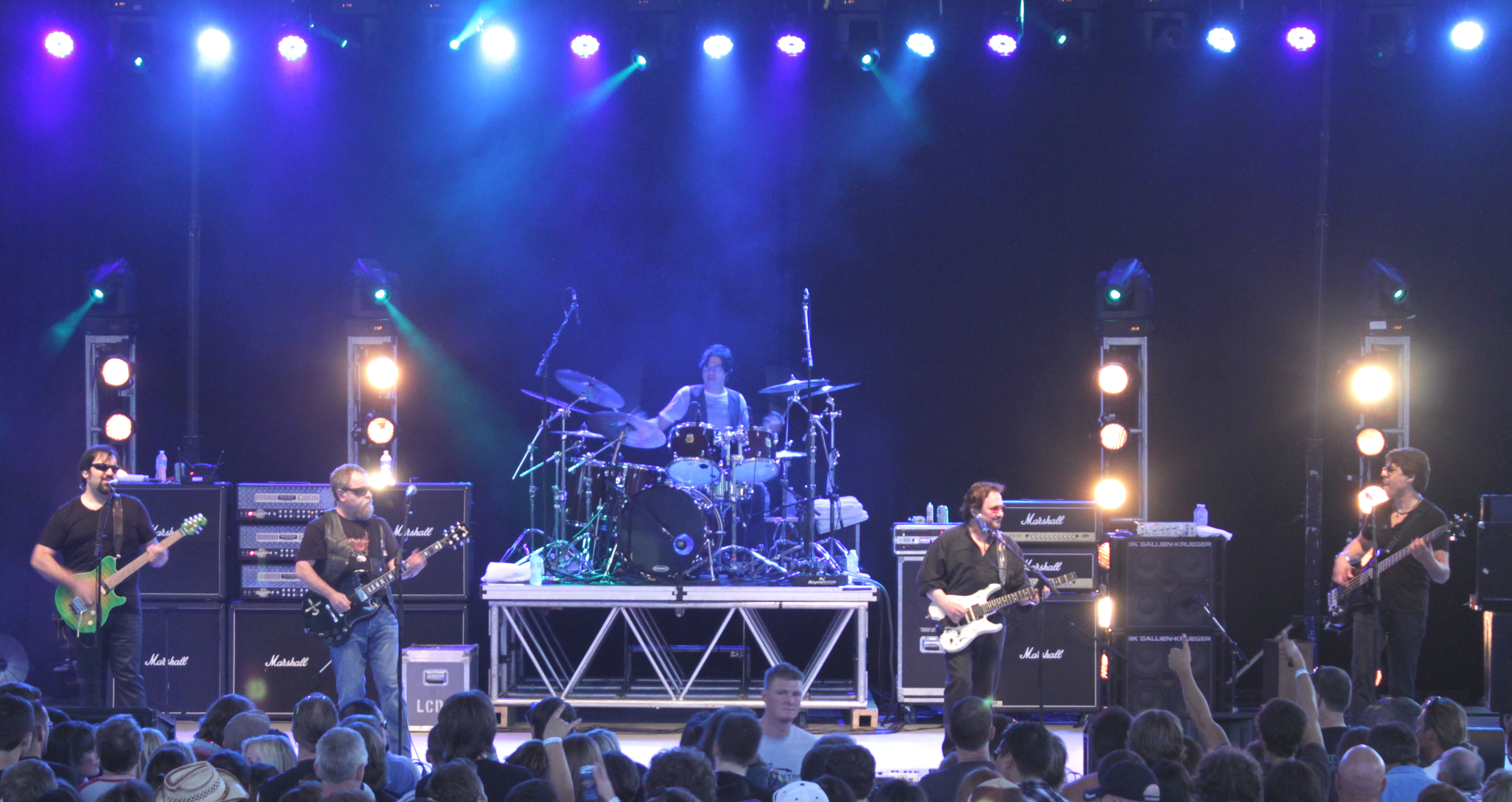
Blue Öyster Cult performing in Edmonton, Alberta, Canada, 2012

In a May 2017 appearance on Castellano's "Band Geek" podcast, Bloom confirmed that there were tentative plans to release a new album in 2018 and that the band was currently considering offers from multiple record labels. He also stated that former bassist Danny Miranda would be playing with the band for the remainder of the year due to Sulton's prior touring commitments with Todd Rundgren. During the same year, the band's official website started to list Miranda as an official member, stating that Miranda had "returned to BÖC" in early 2017.

Buck Dharma stated in February 2019 that the band would be recording a new album to be released by fall. On July 10, 2019, it was announced that the band had signed to Frontiers Music, and would in fact be releasing the new album in 2020. "It's been a long time since BÖC's last studio album. Recording with Danny, Richie and Jules should be a great experience as we've been touring together for years, and Buck and I look forward to including them in the creative and recording process," said Bloom. "The current band is GREAT and has never been recorded other than live, so we feel now's the time for new songs to be written and recorded. About half of the songs for the new record exist and the rest will be finished during the process," added Dharma. In February 2020, Castellano posted a short video to Facebook featuring himself and Bloom, stating that the band were working on the new Blue Öyster Cult record remotely by using ConnectionOpen online audio collaboration tool.

In August 2020, the band announced on their website that their fifteenth studio album The Symbol Remains would be released on October 9, 2020. The span of nineteen years between Curse of the Hidden Mirror and The Symbol Remains marks the longest gap between studio albums in Blue Öyster Cult's career. The album was released to a positive critical reception, with tracks such as "Box In My Head" and "The Alchemist" receiving high praise.

In October 2022, during their European headlining tour, Blue Öyster Cult supported Deep Purple at five arena shows in the United Kingdom.

On April 12, 2024, Blue Öyster Cult released their sixteenth and final studio album Ghost Stories, which includes both reimagined tracks and "lost gems" from between 1978 and 2016, as well as studio versions of their covers of MC5's "Kick Out the Jams" and The Animals' "We Gotta Get Out of This Place".

On May 24, 2025, Blue Öyster Cult performed under their original name Soft White Underbelly at Islington Assembly Hall in London.

In May 2026, frontman Eric Bloom was filled in by former bandmate Kasim Sulton for a few shows for their 2026 tour, following Bloom's surgery. Bloom is expected to return after his recovery, his last show with the band before their carefully planned break for his procedure was in February 2026.

== Artistry ==
=== Musical style ===
Blue Öyster Cult is usually described as a hard rock band, albeit one with their own tongue-in-cheek style. Their music has also been described as heavy metal, psychedelic rock, occult rock, acid rock, and progressive rock. They have also been recognized for helping pioneer genres such as stoner metal. The band has also experimented with additional genres on specific albums, such as on Mirrors. RockLists has noted that "Blue Öyster Cult were the smart kids' heavy metal band, and they never let you forget it", and claimed the band's "sound welded hard rock to psychedelia and came out sleek, spooky and loud".

In 1986, Scott Morrow of RIP Magazine wrote, "Along with albums by such pioneers as Led Zeppelin, Mountain, Deep Purple, Blue Cheer, and Black Sabbath, some of the earliest speed metal sounds can be heard on Blue Öyster Cult's masterpiece Tyranny and Mutation. With its screamin' stun guitars, growling vocals, maniacal tempos and overall bad-dude attitude, B.Ö.C. set a precedent in the still-young metal arena. This, however, was only a glimpse of future mayhem."

They have acknowledged the influence of artists such as Alice Cooper, Grateful Dead, The Doors, Jefferson Airplane, Mahavishnu Orchestra, MC5, The Blues Project, Jimi Hendrix, and Black Sabbath.

=== Lyrics ===
The band have frequently collaborated with outside lyricists, although all of the original members wrote lyrics at some point, most notably Donald Roeser. The principal lyricists in the early days were manager Sandy Pearlman and fellow rock critic Richard Meltzer. Key members of the New York punk scene Patti Smith, Helen "Wheels" Robbins and Jim Carroll - all friends of the band - contributed from the mid-1970s. Later in the decade frontman Eric Bloom, a science fiction fan, recruited English author Michael Moorcock to write for the band, and later did the same with Eric Van Lustbader and John Shirley.

In order to add to their mystique the band would often use out-of-context fragments of Pearlman's unpublished sci-fi poetry cycle The Soft Doctrines of Imaginos as lyrics, rendering their meaning obscure. Additionally, they kept a folder of Pearlman's and Meltzer's word associations to insert into their songs.

== Band name and logo ==
The hook-and-cross logo

One variant of the lead symbol in alchemy, also used to represent the planet Saturn in astrology

The name "Blue Öyster Cult" also came from Pearlman's Imaginos cycle, explored most extensively on the 1988 album of the same name. Pearlman had also come up with the band's earlier name, "Soft White Underbelly", from a phrase used by Winston Churchill in describing Italy during World War II. In Pearlman's poetry, the "Blue Oyster Cult" is a group of aliens who had assembled secretly to guide Earth's history. "Initially, the band was not happy with the name, but settled for it, and went to work preparing to record their first release..."

In a 1976 interview published in ZigZag, Pearlman claimed the origin of the band's name was as an anagram of "Cully Stout Beer". This is believed to be untrue. In 1991, Entertainment Weekly, speaking to Pearlman, reported that Pearlman and Meltzer had named the band "Blue Öyster Cult" after seeing Blue Point oysters in a menu in the window of a restaurant on a New York street corner, with the umlaut being Meltzer's suggestion. However, it is generally agreed that the name "Blue Oyster Cult" comes from the title of a poem from Pearlman's pre-existing project 'Soft Doctrines of Imaginos'.

Blue Öyster Cult's website states the umlaut was added by guitarist and keyboardist Allen Lanier, as does Blue Öyster Cult chronicler Bolle Gregmar, but rock critic Richard Meltzer claims to have suggested it to their producer and manager Sandy Pearlman just after Pearlman came up with the name: "I said, 'How about an umlaut over the O?' Metal had a Wagnerian aspect anyway." Meltzer's claim is supported by an anecdote of Pearlman's. Other bands later copied the practice of using umlauts or diacritic marks in their own band names, such as Motörhead, Mötley Crüe, Queensrÿche and Spın̈al Tap.

The hook-and-cross logo was designed by fellow Stony Brook student Bill Gawlik as a part of his master's thesis in January 1972, and appears on all of the band's albums. In Greek mythology, "... the hook-and-cross symbol is that of Kronos (Cronus), the king of the Titans and father of Zeus ... and is the alchemical symbol for lead (a heavy metal), one of the heaviest of metals." Sandy Pearlman considered this, along with the "heavy" distorted guitar sound of the band, meant that the description "heavy metal" would be apt for the band's sound. The hook-and-cross symbol also resembled the astrological symbol for Saturn, the Roman god of agriculture, and the sickle, which is associated with both Kronos (Cronus) and Saturn (the planet and the Roman god). The symbol also closely resembles the astrological symbol for Ceres, which is also a sickle. The logo's "... metaphysical, alchemical and mythological connotations, combined with its similarity to some religious symbols gave it a flair of decadence and mystery ..."

The band was billed, for the only time, as "The Blue Öyster Cult" on the cover and label of their second album, Tyranny and Mutation.

=== Legacy ===
Blue Öyster Cult has been dubbed "the thinking man's heavy metal band" for their often cryptic lyrics, literate songwriting, and links to famous authors. Acts citing their influence include Iron Maiden, Metallica, Fates Warning, Iced Earth, Cirith Ungol, Alice in Chains, Twisted Sister, Ratt, Steel Panther, Green River (and later Mudhoney), Body Count, Possessed, Candlemass, Saint Vitus, Trouble, Opeth, White Zombie, Kvelertak, HIM, Turbonegro, Radio Birdman, The Cult, The Minutemen, Firehose, Hoodoo Gurus, Widespread Panic, Queens of the Stone Age, Umphrey's McGee, Stabbing Westward, Royal Trux, and Moe.

The band has incluenced artists in other fields. The lyrics of "Astronomy" have been named by Shawn St. Jean as an inspiration to the later chapters of his fantasy novel Clotho's Loom, wherein Sandy Pearlman's "Four Winds Bar" provides the setting for a portion of the action. Titles and lyrics from the band provided structure and narrative for the third book in J. K. Rowling 's series of Cormoran Strike novels, Career of Evil.

The lyrics of "(Don't Fear) The Reaper" are an epigraph of Stephen King's The Stand (1978). That year, it was used in John Carpenter's Halloween. It was covered by The Mutton Birds for Peter Jackson's horror-comedy film The Frighteners (1996). The song was used throughout the comedy film The Stoned Age (1994) and plays a role in its storyline. In Gone Girl (2014), the song plays on the radio during a car driving scene. The song was also used as the opening theme and main story element in the 1996 FMV computer game Ripper, by Take Two Interactive, and was also featured in the 2006 game Prey and the 2021 game Returnal. T The song was also used in Orange Is the New Blacks season 2 finale.

The creation of "Reaper" was spoofed in the Saturday Night Live sketch "More Cowbell", written by and starring Will Ferrell as cowbell player Gene Frenkle and featuring Chris Parnell as Eric Bloom, Jimmy Fallon as Bobby Rondinelli, Chris Kattan as Buck Dharma, Horatio Sanz as Joe Bouchard and Christopher Walken as music producer Bruce Dickinson. The original recording was produced at The Record Plant in New York by David Lucas, who sang background vocals with Roeser, and introduced the now-famous cowbell part, which may have been played by himself, Bouchard, or Bloom.

== Band members ==
Current

- Buck Dharma – lead guitar, lead and backing vocals (1967–1986, 1987–present)
- Eric Bloom – lead and backing vocals, "stun guitar" (rhythm), keyboards, synthesizers (1969–1986, 1987–present)
- Danny Miranda – bass, backing vocals (1995–2004, 2017–present)
- Richie Castellano – keyboards, rhythm guitar, additional lead guitar, backing and additional lead vocals (2007–present), bass (2004–2007)
- Jules Radino – drums, percussion (2004–present)

== Discography ==
Studio albums

- Blue Öyster Cult (1972)
- Tyranny and Mutation (1973)
- Secret Treaties (1974)
- Agents of Fortune (1976)
- Spectres (1977)
- Mirrors (1979)
- Cultösaurus Erectus (1980)
- Fire of Unknown Origin (1981)
- The Revölution by Night (1983)
- Club Ninja (1985)
- Imaginos (1988)
- Cult Classic (1994)
- Heaven Forbid (1998)
- Curse of the Hidden Mirror (2001)
- The Symbol Remains (2020)
- Ghost Stories (2024)

== Bibliography ==
- Blue Öyster Cult: Secrets Revealed!, by Martin Popoff, Metal Blade Records, 207 pages (US, 2004)
- Blue Öyster Cult: La Carrière du Mal, by Mathieu Bollon and Aurélien Lemant, Camion Blanc, 722 pages (France, 2013)
- Agents of Fortune: The Blue Öyster Cult Story, by Martin Popoff, Wymer Publishing, 245 pages (UK, 2016)
- Blue Öyster Cult: Every Album, Every Song, by Jacob Holm-Lupo, Sonicbond Publishing, 158 pages (UK, 2019)
- Flaming Telepaths: Imaginos Expanded and Specified, by Martin Popoff, Power Chord Press, 200 pages (Canada, 2021)
