= Astronomy (Blue Öyster Cult song) =

- 1988 UK re-release

Song by Blue Öyster Cult

from the album Secret Treaties
- Released: April 1974; September 1978; July 1988; June 1994; September 2002
- Genre: Hard rock; progressive rock; heavy metal
- Length: 6:28 (1974 studio version); 8:18 (1978 live version); 6:47 (1988 studio version); 8:45 (1994 studio version); 10:19 (2002 live version)
- Label: Columbia Records
- Composers: Albert Bouchard; Joe Bouchard
- Lyricist: Sandy Pearlman
- Producers: Murray Krugman; Sandy Pearlman

"Astronomy" is a song by American rock band Blue Öyster Cult that has appeared on several of the band's albums. It was first released on their 1974 album Secret Treaties. Their second live album, Some Enchanted Evening, included a version with an extended guitar solo and a third version was included on the Imaginos album. It was also re-recorded for the band's Cult Classic collection in connection with the TV miniseries of Stephen King's The Stand. Most recently, the song was included on the A Long Day's Night album.

== Lyrics ==
Astronomy (1988)
The version of "Astronomy" from the album Imaginos was sung by Buck Dharma, instead of Eric Bloom

The song's lyrics are selected verses from a poem by Sandy Pearlman, the band's producer and mastermind behind their image, called "The Soft Doctrines of Imaginos". In the poem, which was later partially released under the BÖC moniker in the album Imaginos, aliens known as Les Invisibles guide an altered human named Imaginos, also called Desdinova, through history, playing key roles that eventually lead to the outbreak of World War I.

In "Astronomy", the character of Imaginos comes to realize his heritage and his role as the altered human. He is raised from the dead and transforms into the female persona of Desdinova, who is also mentioned on the back cover of Secret Treaties and in the song "I Am the One You Warned Me Of" from the Imaginos album. References are made to celestial objects throughout the song: "the light that never warms" being the Moon, "the queenly flux" the constellation Cassiopeia, though both may also serve as epithets or descriptions of Desdinova. "My dog, fixed and consequent" refers to Sirius, the dog star. The "Four Winds Bar" may be a reference to the Tropic of Cancer, compass rose, or an actual bar.

== Music video ==
A music video of the 1988 version was released by Sandy Pearlman in the United Kingdom. The video had no footage of the band playing, and instead focused on the story told by the song. Longtime BÖC fan and author Stephen King recorded a spoken narration for the video, which is as follows:

Imaginos (performed by Blue Öyster Cult) – A bedtime story for the children of the damned. From a dream world, paralleling our earth in time and space, the invisible ones have sent an agent who will dream the dream of history. With limitless power he becomes the greatest actor of the 19th century. Taking on many ingenious disguises, he places himself at pivotal junctures in history, continually altering its course and testing our ability to respond to the challenge of evil. His name is 'Imaginos'.

== Reception ==
AllMusic said: "This prog-tinged epic is one of the most legendary songs in the Blue Öyster Cult canon."

== Covers ==
- Metallica covered the song for their 1998 Garage Inc. album.
- Arch Enemy used the chorus for their song "Pilgrim" from the Burning Bridges album.
- Albert Bouchard's band the Brain Surgeons recorded the song for their 1997 album Malpractise with Deborah Frost on lead vocals. Albert's post-Brain Surgeons band Ünderbelly released a version of the song with original Soft White Underbelly singer Les Braunstein on lead vocals in 2011.
