= Veteran of the Psychic Wars =

Song by Blue Öyster Cult

from the album Fire of Unknown Origin
- Released: July 1981
- Genre: Progressive rock; psychedelic rock; occult rock
- Length: 4:49
- Label: Columbia
- Songwriters: Eric Bloom; Michael Moorcock
- Producer: Martin Birch

"Veteran of the Psychic Wars" is a song by the American hard rock band Blue Öyster Cult. It was written by Eric Bloom and British author Michael Moorcock (creator of Elric of Melniboné). The song first appeared on the 1981 album Fire of Unknown Origin. An extended live version appears on the 1982 album Extraterrestrial Live. It also appears on the soundtrack of the 1981 animated film Heavy Metal.

The phrase "...veteran of a Thousand Psychic Wars" is from the Hawkwind song "Standing at the Edge," from the album Warrior on the Edge of Time (1975), which also dealt with the myth of the Eternal Champion and contained lyrics written by Moorcock. Prior to that, the term "psychic war" appears in the poem "Far Arden" by Jim Morrison of The Doors.

The song has been covered by King Django meets the Scrucialists (2003), Arjen Anthony Lucassen (2012), as well as in live performances by the Finnish metal band Tarot in 2004, as a bonus track in their 2006 album, and Metallica at the Bridge School Benefit in 2007 and later concerts.

== Critical reception ==
In an article published by The A.V. Club writer Jason Heller describes the song as a "pseudo-mystical post-Vietnam parable." Writing that "Veteran of the Psychic Wars" was the dead center of Heavy Metal’s admittedly amorphous core, he further stated "The drums are tribal. The synths hum like incantations. The guitar is minimal, applied with ritualistic precision". AllMusic wrote: "This moody mini-epic, a highlight of the Fire of Unknown Origin album, blends art rock, new wave, and heavy metal elements into one singularly potent track."

== Personnel ==
- Eric Bloom – lead vocals, rhythm guitar
- Donald 'Buck Dharma' Roeser – lead guitar, percussion
- Joe Bouchard – bass
- Allen Lanier – keyboards
- Albert Bouchard – drums
