= Fire of Unknown Origin =

- Cover art by Greg Scott

Studio album by Blue Öyster Cult
- Released: June 22, 1981
- Recorded: Spring 1981
- Studios: Kingdom, Long Island, New York; The Automatt, San Francisco, California
- Genres: Hard rock; progressive rock; heavy metal
- Length: 39:06
- Label: Columbia
- Producer: Martin Birch

Blue Öyster Cult chronology
Cultösaurus Erectus (1980)	Fire of Unknown Origin (1981)	Extraterrestrial Live (1982)

Singles from Fire of Unknown Origin
- 1. "Burnin' for You" Released: August 1981 (US)

Professional ratings
Review scores
Source	Rating
AllMusic	4.5/5 stars
Collector's Guide to Heavy Metal	9/10

Fire of Unknown Origin is the eighth studio album by the American rock band Blue Öyster Cult, released on June 22, 1981. It was produced by Martin Birch.

The album, which included the top 40 hit "Burnin' for You" (number 1 on Billboard's Album Rock Tracks chart), represented a resurgence of the group's commercial standing after two albums with disappointing sales. It became the band's highest-charting studio album on the Billboard 200, peaking at number 24. Fire of Unknown Origin would be the final studio LP featuring the band's original lineup; during the subsequent tour, the band fired original drummer Albert Bouchard.

The album has been remastered and re-released on CD and vinyl several times, for example 2013 by Culture Factory USA and 2020 by Music on Vinyl, and 2011 as part of the box set Original Album Classics on Sony / Legacy.

== Songs ==
Several of the songs were intended for the soundtrack of the animated film Heavy Metal, such as "Vengeance (The Pact)", the lyrics of which follow in detail the plot of the "Taarna" segment of the movie. However, only the song "Veteran of the Psychic Wars" (not originally written for the film), co-written by science-fiction author Michael Moorcock, ended up in the film's final version and soundtrack. The title track as well as "Burnin' for You" were both used in episode 17 of season 1 of Supernatural entitled "Hell House", written by long-time BÖC fan Trey Callaway.

The album's closing track, "Don't Turn Your Back", marks Allen Lanier's final songwriting contribution to Blue Öyster Cult; it was played live by the group for the first time on June 17, 2016, at a special concert highlighting Lanier's music.

The album's title track, "Fire of Unknown Origin", was originally considered for the band's fourth album, but was cut. The original version of the song is available through the band's 2017 compilation Rarities.

"Joan Crawford" was a moderate success, reaching #49 on the Billboard Mainstream Rock chart. The subject of the song is the actress of the same name, who had died four years before the song's release. A music video was created for the song, which was banned by MTV for featuring a sexually suggestive scene.

== Track listing ==
All lead vocals by Eric Bloom, except where noted.

Side one
No.	Title	Writer(s)	Lead vocals	Length
1.	"Fire of Unknown Origin"	Eric Bloom, Albert Bouchard, Joe Bouchard, Donald Roeser, Patti Smith		4:09
2.	"Burnin' for You"	Roeser, Richard Meltzer	Roeser	4:29
3.	"Veteran of the Psychic Wars"	Bloom, Michael Moorcock		4:48
4.	"Sole Survivor"	Bloom, Liz Myers, John Trivers		4:04
5.	"Heavy Metal: The Black and Silver"	Bloom, A. Bouchard, Sandy Pearlman		3:16

Side two
No.	Title	Writer(s)	Lead vocals	Length
1.	"Vengeance (The Pact)"	A. Bouchard, J. Bouchard	J. Bouchard	4:41
2.	"After Dark"	Bloom, Myers, Trivers		4:25
3.	"Joan Crawford"	A. Bouchard, Jack Rigg, David Roter		4:55
4.	"Don't Turn Your Back"	A. Bouchard, Allen Lanier, Roeser	Roeser	4:07

== Personnel ==
Band members

- Eric Bloom – vocals, bass on track 5
- Donald 'Buck Dharma' Roeser – lead guitar, vocals, percussion on track 3, bass and sound effects on track 8
- Allen Lanier – keyboards
- Joe Bouchard – bass, vocals
- Albert Bouchard – drums, synthesizer, vocals, mixing (uncredited)

Additional musicians

- Karla DeVito – background vocals on track 4
- Sandy Jean – background vocals on track 9
- Bill Civitella, Tony Cedrone – additional percussion on track 3
- Jesse Levy – string arrangements on tracks 3 and 8

Production

- Martin Birch – producer, engineer, mixing
- Clay Hutchinson – engineer
- Paul Stubblebine – mastering
- Greg Scott – album artwork

== Charts ==
Chart (1981)	Peak position
Canada Top Albums/CDs (RPM)	21
UK Albums (Official Charts)	29
US Billboard 200	24

== Certifications ==
Region	Certification	Certified units/sales
Canada (Music Canada)	Gold	50,000^{^}
United States (RIAA)	Gold	500,000^{^}
^{^} Shipments figures based on certification alone.
