= Burnin' for You =

Single by Blue Öyster Cult

from the album Fire of Unknown Origin
- B-side: "Vengeance (The Pact)"
- Released: August 1981
- Recorded: 1981
- Genre: Hard rock
- Length: 3:45 (single edit); 4:29 (album version)
- Label: Columbia
- Songwriters: Donald Roeser; Richard Meltzer
- Producer: Martin Birch

Blue Öyster Cult singles chronology
"Deadline" (1980)	"Burnin' for You" (1981)	"Roadhouse Blues" (1982)

Music video
- Burnin' for You on YouTube

"Burnin' for You" is a song by American hard rock band Blue Öyster Cult. It was released as the lead single from the band's eighth studio album Fire of Unknown Origin, released in June 1981, where it was the album's second track. The song was co-written by guitarist Donald "Buck Dharma" Roeser and songwriter Richard Meltzer, who wrote lyrics for several of the band's songs. Roeser sang lead vocals on the song (as he also did on the band's biggest chart hit, 1976's "(Don't Fear) The Reaper" in lieu of Blue Öyster Cult's usual lead vocalist Eric Bloom.

The song hit No. 1 on the Billboard Mainstream Rock chart, and the single spent three weeks in the top 40 (peaking at No. 40) on the Billboard Hot 100 chart. It was aided by a popular early MTV music video.

== Composition ==
"Burnin' for You" was written by Blue Öyster Cult lead guitarist Buck Dharma and rock critic Richard Meltzer. Meltzer wrote numerous songs for the band, with many in conjunction with Roeser. Dharma wrote his parts of the song in his garage studio.

Richard would write on a typewriter and we’d have sheets of lyrics and on the page and it would look just look like poetry with a lot of lower case and free form, free association. I don’t know how long I’d had his lyric but it was about 1980 and we’d moved to Connecticut ... I wrote it in my garage studio. I’m quite proud of it. It’s one of Richard’s more sentimental lyrics, something he’s not known for.

— Buck Dharma

Dharma originally planned to keep the song for release on his 1982 solo debut album Flat Out. However, Blue Öyster Cult's manager Sandy Pearlman persuaded him to give the song to the band.

== Reception ==
The song reached No. 40 on the Billboard Hot 100, becoming the band's second and final top 40 hit after "(Don't Fear) The Reaper" reached No. 12 on the Hot 100 in 1976. It was Blue Öyster Cult's third song to ever chart on the Hot 100 and it would be their second to last after "Shooting Shark" peaked at No. 83 in 1984.

"Burnin' for You" also became Blue Öyster Cult's first song to chart on Billboard's newly created Top Tracks chart (now known as Mainstream Rock Songs). It reached No. 1 on the chart dated the week of August 22, 1981, in its eighth week on the chart. It was the seventh song to ever reach No. 1 on the chart, and it stayed at No. 1 for two weeks. "Burnin' for You" remains Blue Öyster Cult's only number-one hit on the rock charts, and one of two top ten hits ("Dancin' in the Ruins" reached No. 9 in 1986). The song stayed on the chart for 23 weeks.

Record World said that it's "one of [Blue Oyster Cult's] most commercial outings to date, thanks to Eric Bloom's passionate vocals and a nifty melody." AllMusic wrote: "In typical Blue Öyster Cult style, this crafty hard rock tune mixes obtuse lyrics with sharp riffs to create a punchy but eccentrically witty rocker."

== Personnel ==
- Eric Bloom – rhythm guitar, keyboards, backing vocals
- Donald "Buck Dharma" Roeser – lead guitar, lead vocals
- Allen Lanier – keyboards, guitar
- Joe Bouchard – bass guitar, backing vocals
- Albert Bouchard – drums, backing vocals

== Charts ==
Chart (1981)	Peak position
Canada Top Singles (RPM)	47
UK Singles (OCC)	76
US Billboard Hot 100	40
US Mainstream Rock (Billboard)	1
US Cashbox Top 100	34
US Record World Singles Chart	35

== Certifications ==
Region	Certification	Certified units/sales
United States (RIAA)	2× Platinum	2,000,000^{‡}
^{‡} Sales+streaming figures based on certification alone.

== Cover version ==
Pop rock band Shiny Toy Guns covered the song, albeit with a shortened pre-chorus and a bridge that just repeats "I'm burning, I'm burning, I'm burning, burning, burning..." before leading into a final chorus. This version of the song was used to advertise select models of Lincoln sedans.

Ohio based rock band Toxic Nobility covered the song with a faster tempo released on streaming platforms in December of 2024

== In popular culture ==
Burnin' for You was featured in the 2005 film 12 and Holding.
