= Blue Öyster Cult (album) =

Studio album by Blue Öyster Cult
- Released: January 1972
- Recorded: October 1971
- Studios: The Warehouse, New York City
- Genres: Hard rock; heavy metal; psychedelic rock
- Length: 36:48
- Label: Columbia
- Producers: Murray Krugman, Sandy Pearlman, David Lucas

Blue Öyster Cult chronology
| Blue Öyster Cult (1972) | Tyranny and Mutation (1973) |

Singles from Blue Öyster Cult
- 1. "Cities on Flame with Rock and Roll" Released: April 21, 1972

Blue Öyster Cult is the debut studio album by the American rock band Blue Öyster Cult, released in January 1972 by Columbia Records. The album featured songs such as "Cities on Flame with Rock and Roll", "Stairway to the Stars", and "Then Came the Last Days of May", all of which the band still plays regularly during its concerts. Despite positive reviews, the album failed to chart for some time before finally cracking the Billboard 200 chart on May 20, 1972, peaking at No. 172. Blue Öyster Cult toured with artists such as the Byrds, Alice Cooper and the Mahavishnu Orchestra to support the album.

== Recording ==
Joe Bouchard reflected on the album's creation in 2022:

I couldn't believe how much fun I was having. Every day I'd get up and we'd be going to the studio, and I'd be like, 'I can't believe we're going to a studio to make an album…a real album, on Columbia Records!' So, I was excited every day. And I was learning how records are made – this was at David Lucas' jingle studio in New York. On eight tracks. That's all you had – you had to do the whole album on eight tracks. But he would show us little magical ways of doubling things and doing live bounces. They'd be flipping the tape over backwards and he'd be making flanging using duplication of the part. So, he was all into what was happening with the Beatles and that production. And of course, Sandy Pearlman and Murray Krugman produced that record – so they kept us conceptually...instead of going way off track, they wanted to establish what was going to become Blue Öyster Cult. It had to have that vibe. When it came out, I was a little disappointed – I didn't like the vinyl pressing. But then maybe about 15 years later, they put it out on CD, and then all of a sudden, it brought me back to the studio. It was cleaner, and it was like sitting in the control room, listening to the playback of the mixes. I think we were all tremendously excited to be working on that record. And it sounds like it.

== Track information ==
=== "Transmaniacon MC" ===
"Transmaniacon MC" is about the Altamont Free Concert. The "MC" in the title stands for "motorcycle club".

=== "I'm on the Lamb but I Ain't No Sheep" ===
"I'm on the Lamb but I Ain't No Sheep" is about a fugitive pursued by the Royal Canadian Mounted Police and was originally recorded in 1970 (when the band was known as Oaxaca). Another version from 1970 was intended to be included on the band's unreleased first album for Elektra Records (when the band was known as "Stalk-Forrest Group"). Both of these 1970 versions were eventually included on St. Cecilia: The Elektra Recordings. In 1971, the song was recorded again and finally released on the first Columbia album, and then recorded again at a much faster tempo and with much heavier guitars as "The Red and the Black" and included on the band's second Columbia album, Tyranny and Mutation. The main riff in this song was heavily inspired by "Frying Pan", a Captain Beefheart B-side from 1966. Some versions of the song make this influence more apparent than others.

=== "Then Came the Last Days of May" ===
"Then Came the Last Days of May" is based on a reportedly true story, when two friends of Dharma's were killed in a drug deal gone bad in the West:

It was still in the Soft White Underbelly days when we were playing dances at Stony Brook University [on Long Island] for our sustenance money. Three Stony Brook students went to Tucson, Arizona, to buy some bulk marijuana for resale. I don't know how they got whatever contact they had, but it was two brothers – scions from one of the better-to-do families in Tucson. They never intended to sell them any pot. They just wanted to rip 'em off and shoot 'em, which they did. They took them out to the desert and shot them. It was three guys, and one managed to survive and get back to the highway ... I wrote the story from basically the newspaper accounts of the Long Island newspaper, Newsday ... There's a personal connection, too. I knew one of the guys casually from Stony Brook University when we were hanging out there.

This song is frequently played live as a showcase for Buck Dharma's guitar soloing skills.

=== "Before the Kiss, a Redcap" ===
Originally titled "Conry's Bar", "Before the Kiss, a Redcap" describes scenes from that real location. Guitarist Buck Dharma explains the title as originating in an event witnessed by lyricist/manager Sandy Pearlman in which the titular drug was passed between partners during a kiss. The term "redcap" was supposedly slang for a type of barbiturate; however, "redcap" usually referred to the drug Dalmane.

=== "Cities on Flame with Rock and Roll" ===
"Cities on Flame with Rock and Roll" was written by Sandy Pearlman, Donald Roeser and Albert Bouchard, and released as a single. Bouchard performed lead vocals, also singing from his drum kit in concerts. The riff was inspired by Black Sabbath's song "The Wizard," featured on their own self-titled debut album. It remains a staple of Blue Öyster Cult's live shows. On live albums, the name of the song is shortened to "Cities on Flame."

=== "Redeemed" ===
The lyrics were written by singer-songwriter Harry Farcas, and sold to the band. "Sir Rastus Bear" was Farcas' pet Saint Bernard.

== Reception ==
Professional ratings
Review scores
| Source | Rating |
|---|---|
| AllMusic | 4/5 stars |
| Christgau's Record Guide | B+ |
| Classic Rock | 3.5/5 stars |
| Collector's Guide to Heavy Metal | 8/10 |
| The Rolling Stone Album Guide | 4/5 stars |

The album received a positive reaction from critics. Lester Bangs gave the album a generally positive review in Rolling Stone stating, "with the Blue Öyster Cult, New York has produced its first authentic boogie beast, and with any luck this one should be around for awhile" telling readers that "I don't think you should miss this album." Circus wrote that "it could well be the album of the Seventies", while Robert Christgau in The Village Voice called it "the tightest and most musical hard rock record since – dare I say it? – Who's Next". The record was named an honorable mention on IGN's list of "Top 25 Metal Albums" and has been called "heavy metal for people who hate heavy metal." Canadian critic Martin Popoff criticized the "limp and lifeless" guitar sound and the unimpressive percussive display, which did not make a good service to the "tragic and beautiful BÖC compositions" on the album, leaving the listener "in muted bewilderment".

== Covers and appearances ==
A cover version of "Cities on Flame with Rock and Roll" has been covered by Church of Misery (on Master of Brutality), Iced Earth (on Tribute to the Gods) and 3 Inches of Blood (as a bonus track on Here Waits Thy Doom). The song appears in the American television period sitcom That '70s Show, as well as its soundtrack. Several tracks from Blue Öyster Cult have appeared in video games, such as Cities on Flame with Rock and Roll in Guitar Hero III: Legends of Rock and Its mobile counterpart, as well as Transmaniacon MC in Rock Band 2.

Guitarist William Tyler performs a 2015 solo acoustic instrumental version of "She's as Beautiful as a Foot" on Aquarium Drunkard's "Lagniappe Sessions" page.

== Track listing ==
All lead vocals by Eric Bloom, except where noted.

Side one
| No. | Title | Writer(s) | Lead vocals | Length |
|---|---|---|---|---|
| 1. | "Transmaniacon MC" | Bloom, Albert Bouchard, Donald "Buck Dharma" Roeser, Sandy Pearlman | | 3:21 |
| 2. | "I'm on the Lamb but I Ain't No Sheep" | Bloom, A. Bouchard, Pearlman | | 3:10 |
| 3. | "Then Came the Last Days of May" | Roeser | Roeser | 3:31 |
| 4. | "Stairway to the Stars" | A. Bouchard, Roeser, Richard Meltzer | | 3:43 |
| 5. | "Before the Kiss, a Redcap" | Allen Lanier, Murray Krugman, Roeser, Pearlman | Roeser | 4:59 |

Side two
| No. | Title | Writer(s) | Lead vocals | Length |
|---|---|---|---|---|
| 1. | "Screams" | Joe Bouchard | J. Bouchard | 3:10 |
| 2. | "She's as Beautiful as a Foot" | A. Bouchard, Lanier, Meltzer | | 2:58 |
| 3. | "Cities on Flame with Rock and Roll" | A. Bouchard, Roeser, Pearlman | A. Bouchard | 4:03 |
| 4. | "Workshop of the Telescopes" | Bloom, A. Bouchard, J. Bouchard, Lanier, Roeser, Pearlman | | 4:01 |
| 5. | "Redeemed" | A. Bouchard, Lanier, Harry Farcas, Pearlman | | 3:51 |
| Total length: | | | | 36:48 |

2001 CD reissue bonus tracks (recorded at CBS Studios, New York City, July 21–September 11, 1969)
| No. | Title | Writer(s) | Length |
|---|---|---|---|
| 11. | "Donovan's Monkey" | A. Bouchard, Meltzer | 3:50 |
| 12. | "What Is Quicksand" | Lanier, Meltzer | 3:40 |
| 13. | "A Fact About Sneakers" | A. Bouchard, Meltzer | 2:50 |
| 14. | "Betty Lou's Got a New Pair of Shoes" | Bobby Freeman | 2:34 |
| Total length: | | | 49:02 |

== Personnel ==
Blue Öyster Cult

- Eric Bloom – vocals, stun guitar, keyboards
- Donald "Buck Dharma" Roeser – lead guitar, vocals
- Joe Bouchard – bass, vocals
- Albert Bouchard – drums, vocals
- Allen Lanier – rhythm guitar, keyboards

2001 bonus tracks as 'Soft White Underbelly'

- Eric Bloom – vocals, rhythm guitar
- Albert Bouchard – drums, vocals
- Allen Lanier – keyboards, rhythm guitar
- Donald Roeser – lead guitar, vocals
- Andy Winters – bass

Production

- David Lucas – producer, engineer
- Murray Krugman, Sandy Pearlman – associate producers
- Bill Robertson – engineer
- Bill Gawlik - artwork
- Bruce Dickinson – reissue compilation
- Vic Anesini – reissue mastering

== Charts ==
| Chart (1972) | Peak position |
|---|---|
| US Billboard 200 | 172 |
