= Aileen Wuornos =

American serial killer (1956–2002)

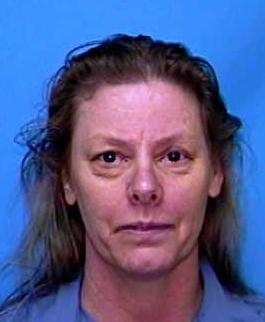
- Wuornos in 2002
- Born: Aileen Carol Pittman; February 29, 1956; Rochester, Michigan, U.S.
- Died: October 9, 2002 (aged 46); Florida State Prison, Florida, U.S.
- Resting place: Ashes scattered in Michigan, U.S.
- Other names: Sandra Kretsch; Susan Lynn Blahovec; Lee Blahovec; Cammie Marsh Greene; Lori Kristine Grody
- Spouse: Lewis Gratz Fell (m. 1976; ann. 1976)
- Partner: Tyria Moore (1986–1991)
- Children: 1
- Status: Executed by lethal injection
- Conviction: First-degree murder (6 counts)
- Penalty: Death

Details
- Victims: 7
- Span of crimes: November 30, 1989 – November 19, 1990
- Country: United States
- State: Florida
- Weapon: High Standard .22 revolver
- Date apprehended: January 9, 1991

Aileen Carol Wuornos (/ˈwɔːrnoʊs/; née Pittman; February 29, 1956 – October 9, 2002) was an American serial killer who, while engaging in street prostitution along highways in Florida between 1989 and 1990, robbed and killed seven men who picked her up. She initially testified that the first man she killed, Richard Mallory, had raped her and that the trauma of his assault had influenced her to kill the others. In a 2001 court petition, she instead wrote her motive was robbery in all seven deaths. In a later conversation with documentarian Nick Broomfield that she believed was not being recorded, she said she killed Mallory and "some others" in self-defense, explaining she had lied to hasten her execution and avoid more time on death row. After over ten years on death row, she was executed by lethal injection in 2002.

After her mother abandoned her at age four, Wuornos grew up with her grandparents and was reportedly abused by her grandfather. She became pregnant by 14 and was living on her own by 15, supporting herself through prostitution. A statewide search after the killings ended with her arrest in January 1991. Her girlfriend since 1986, Tyria Moore, assisted investigators in securing a confession to gain immunity. A jury convicted Wuornos of Mallory's murder in 1992; she entered guilty or no contest pleas in five other cases. In 1992, evidence emerged post-trial that Mallory spent ten years in a prison mental institution after a 1957 attempted-rape conviction.

Wuornos ending her appeals prevented the Florida Supreme Court from ruling on Mallory's criminal history. Despite objections that she was mentally ill, her execution proceeded after psychiatrists selected by Governor Jeb Bush concluded that she was competent. Portrayals of her life include an opera, two Broomfield documentaries, and the 2003 film Monster.

== Early life ==
Born Aileen Carol Pittman on February 29, 1956, in Rochester, Michigan, (Note: Myers, Gooch and Meloy (2005) and Smith (2005) give nearby Troy as her birthplace.) Wuornos spent her childhood in neighboring Troy, a Detroit suburb. Her mother, Diane Wuornos, was 14 years old when she married Aileen's father, 18-year-old Leo Pittman, on June 3, 1954. On March 14, 1955, Diane gave birth to Aileen's older brother Keith. After less than two years of marriage, and two months before Aileen was born, Diane filed for divorce. She gave birth to Aileen at the age of 16.

One evening in January 1960, when Wuornos was almost four years old, Diane left the children with a babysitter and called to announce that she would not return, leaving them in the care of their maternal grandparents, Lauri and Britta Wuornos, who legally adopted Keith and Aileen on March 18, 1960. Both grandparents had alcoholism. Wuornos never met her father. In 1967, Leo Pittman was sentenced to life imprisonment for kidnapping and raping a seven-year-old girl. Pittman, diagnosed with schizophrenia, died by suicide by hanging in prison on January 30, 1969.

Wuornos' childhood friend stated that she personally witnessed Wuornos' grandfather beating her with a belt for five minutes. Wuornos also said that her grandfather had sexually assaulted her and forced her to undress before beating her. By age 11, Wuornos began engaging in sexual activity at school in exchange for cigarettes, drugs, and food. She had also engaged in sexual activity with her brother. In 1970, at age 14, she became pregnant after being raped by a friend of her grandfather. Wuornos' friends have claimed that the rapist who impregnated her was a local pedophile in his 60s.

Wuornos gave birth to a boy at a home for unwed mothers on March 23, 1971, and her grandfather forced her to give up the child for adoption. A few months after her son was born, she dropped out of school around the same time that her grandmother died of liver failure. When Wuornos was aged 15, her grandfather threw her out of the house. Living in the woods near her old home, Wuornos supported herself through prostitution.

== Early criminal activity ==
On May 27, 1974, at age 18, Wuornos was arrested in Jefferson County, Colorado, for driving under the influence (DUI), disorderly conduct, and firing a .22-caliber pistol from a moving vehicle. She was later charged with failure to appear.

In 1976, Wuornos hitchhiked to Florida, where she met 69-year-old yacht club president Lewis Gratz Fell. They married quickly, and the announcement of their nuptials was printed in the local newspaper's society pages. Wuornos continually involved herself in confrontations at their local bar and went to jail briefly for assault. She also hit Fell with his own cane, leading him to gain a restraining order against her within weeks of the marriage. She returned to Michigan where, on July 14, 1976, she was arrested at Bernie's Club in Mancelona, Antrim County and charged with assault and disturbing the peace for throwing a cue ball at a bartender's head.

On July 17, her brother Keith died of esophageal cancer and Wuornos received $10,000 (equivalent to $57,000 in 2025) from his life insurance. Wuornos and Fell annulled their marriage on July 21 after only nine weeks. In August 1976, Wuornos was given a $105 fine for drunk driving. She used the money inherited from her brother to pay the fine, and bought a car, which she wrecked shortly afterwards. She spent the rest of the money within 2 months.

In 1978, at age 22, she attempted suicide by shooting herself in the stomach. Between ages 14 and 22, she attempted suicide six times. On May 20, 1981, Wuornos was arrested in Edgewater, Florida, for the armed robbery of a convenience store, where she stole $35 and two packs of cigarettes. She was sentenced to prison on May 4, 1982, and released on June 30, 1983. On May 1, 1984, Wuornos was arrested for attempting to pass forged checks at a bank in Key West. On November 30, 1985, she was named as a suspect in the theft of a revolver and ammunition in Pasco County.

On January 4, 1986, Wuornos was arrested in Miami and charged with car theft, resisting arrest, and obstruction of justice for providing identification bearing her aunt's name. Miami police officers found a .38 caliber revolver and a box of ammunition in the stolen car. On June 2, 1986, Volusia County deputy sheriffs detained Wuornos for questioning after a male companion accused her of pulling a gun in his car and demanding $200. Wuornos was found to be carrying spare ammunition, and police discovered a .22-caliber pistol under the passenger seat she had occupied.

In 1986, 30-year-old Wuornos met 24-year-old Tyria Moore, a motel maid, at a Daytona Beach gay bar called Zodiac. They moved in together, and Wuornos supported them with her earnings as a prostitute. On July 4, 1987, Daytona Beach police detained Wuornos and Moore at a bar for questioning regarding an incident in which they were accused of assault and battery with a beer bottle.

On March 12, 1988, Wuornos accused a Daytona Beach bus driver of assault. She claimed that he pushed her off the bus following a confrontation. Moore was listed as a witness to the incident. Later, at her trial, Wuornos stated, "It was love beyond imaginable. Earthly words cannot describe how I felt about Tyria." Before her execution, Wuornos claimed to still be in love with Moore.

== Series of murders ==
Wuornos murdered seven men within 12 months. All the men were motorists between ages 40 and 65.

- Richard Charles Mallory, age 51, electronics store owner in Clearwater (date of murder: November 30, 1989). Wuornos claimed that Mallory beat, raped, and sodomized her after he drove her to an abandoned area for sexual services. Mallory was Wuornos' first victim and she claimed to have killed him in self-defense. Later, it became known that Mallory had previously been convicted of attempted rape in Maryland. Wuornos made no mention of this until she stood trial, and Moore never claimed she mentioned it to her. Two days after the murder, a Volusia County deputy sheriff found Mallory's abandoned vehicle. On December 13, his body was found several miles away in a wooded area; he had been shot several times, and two bullets to the left lung were found to have been the cause of death.
- David Andrew Spears, age 47, construction worker in Winter Garden. He was declared missing as of May 19, 1990. On June 1, 1990, his naked body was found along US 19 in Citrus County. He had been shot six times with a .22 pistol.
- Charles Edmund Carskaddon, age 40, part-time rodeo worker (date of murder: May 31, 1990). On June 6, 1990, his naked body was found in Pasco County. He had been shot nine times with a .22 caliber weapon. The body had been wrapped in an electric blanket and was badly decomposed. Witnesses saw Wuornos in possession of Carskaddon's car, and Wuornos had pawned a gun identified as belonging to Carskaddon.
- Peter Abraham Siems, age 65, retired merchant seaman. In June 1990, Siems left Jupiter, Florida, for Arkansas. On July 4, 1990, his car was found in Orange Springs, Florida. Moore and Wuornos were seen abandoning the car, and Wuornos' handprint was found on the interior door handle. His body was never found.
- Troy Eugene Burress, age 50, sausage salesman from Ocala, Florida. On July 31, 1990, he was reported missing. On August 4, 1990, his body was found in a wooded area along State Road 19 in Marion County. He had been shot twice.
- Charles Richard "Dick" Humphreys, age 56, retired United States Air Force major, former state child abuse investigator, and former chief of police (date of murder: September 11, 1990). On September 12, 1990, his body was found in Marion County. He was fully clothed and had been shot seven times in the head and torso. His car was found in Suwannee County.
- Walter Gino Antonio, age 61, trucker, security guard, and reserve police officer. On November 19, 1990, Antonio's nearly naked body was found near a remote logging road in Dixie County. He had been shot four times. Five days later, his car was found in Brevard County.

== Arrest and trial ==
On July 4, 1990, Wuornos and Moore abandoned victim Peter Siems' car after they were involved in a crash. Rhonda Bailey, who witnessed the crash, provided police with a description of two women, which later led to a media campaign to locate them. Police also found some of the victims' belongings in pawnshops. Wuornos' fingerprint that was found on a receipt at one of the pawnshops matched the print that was left in Siems' car. Wuornos had a criminal record in Florida, and samples of her prints were in a database.

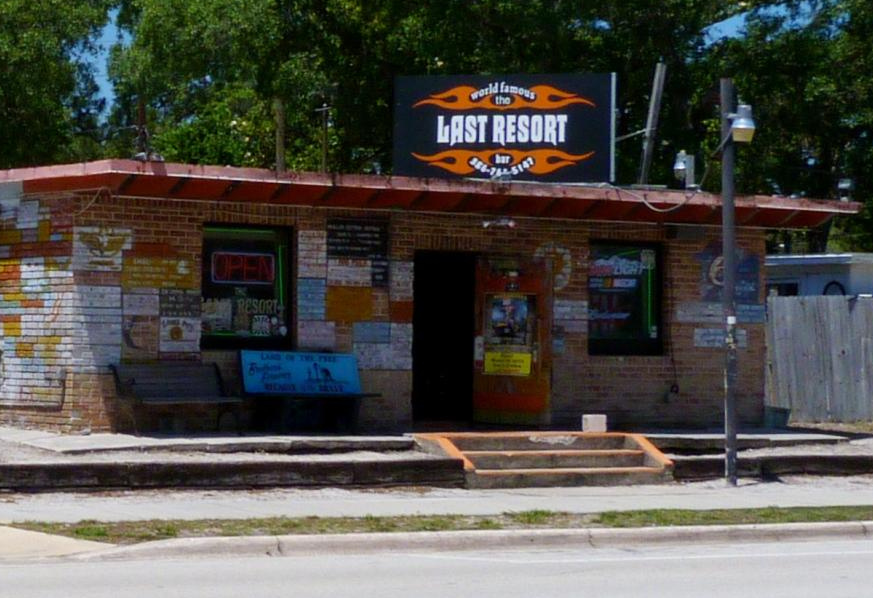
The Last Resort bar in Volusia County, where Wuornos was arrested

On January 9, 1991, Wuornos was arrested at The Last Resort biker bar in Volusia County. According to The New York Times, the arrest was made on the basis of an outstanding warrant for carrying a concealed weapon, although by this point, authorities already came to regard her as a suspect in the murders, based on witnesses' testimony, and fingerprints found on an item found in a pawn shop that had belonged to one of the murdered men. The warrant had been issued in the name of Lori Grody. Police located Moore the next day in Pittston, Pennsylvania. She agreed to elicit a confession from Wuornos in exchange for immunity from prosecution. Moore returned with the police to Florida, where she was put up in a motel. Under police guidance, she made numerous telephone calls to Wuornos, pleading for help in clearing her name. Three days later, on January 16, 1991, Wuornos confessed to the murders. She claimed the men had tried to rape her and she killed them in self-defense.

On January 14, 1992, Wuornos went to trial for the murder of Richard Charles Mallory. Although previous convictions are normally inadmissible in criminal trials, under Florida's Williams Rule, the prosecution was allowed to introduce evidence related to her other crimes to show a pattern of illegal activity. On January 27, 1992, Wuornos was convicted of Mallory's murder with help from Moore's testimony. At her sentencing, psychiatrists for the defense testified that Wuornos was mentally unstable and diagnosed her with borderline personality disorder and antisocial personality disorder. Four days later, she was sentenced to death.

Wuornos' defense made efforts during the trial to introduce evidence that Mallory was previously convicted for attempted rape in Maryland and served a sentence in a maximum-security correctional facility providing remediation to sexual offenders. Records obtained from the correctional institution showed that from 1958 to 1962, Mallory was committed for treatment and observation resulting from a criminal charge of assault with intent to rape. These records also reflect eight years of overall treatment from the facility. In 1961, "it was observed of Mr. Mallory that he possessed strong sociopathic trends". However, the judge refused to allow the records to be admitted in court as evidence, and denied Wuornos' request for a retrial.

On March 31, 1992, Wuornos pleaded no contest to the murders of Charles Richard Humphreys, Troy Eugene Burress, and David Andrew Spears, saying she wanted to "get right with God". In her statement to the court, she said, in part, "I wanted to confess to you that Richard Mallory did violently rape me as I've told you; but these others did not. [They] only began to start to". On May 15, 1992, Wuornos was given three more death sentences. In June 1992, Wuornos pleaded guilty to the murder of Charles Edmund Carskaddon. In November 1992, she received her fifth death sentence. In February 1993, Wuornos pleaded guilty to the murder of Walter Gino Antonio and was sentenced to death again. No charges were brought against her for the murder of Peter Abraham Siems, as his body was never found. In all, Wuornos received six death sentences.

Wuornos told several inconsistent stories about the killings. She claimed initially that all seven men had either raped or attempted to rape her while she was working as a prostitute but later recanted the claim of self-defense, citing robbery and a desire to leave no witnesses as the reason for murder. During an interview with documentarian Nick Broomfield, when Wuornos thought the cameras were off, she told him that it was, in fact, self-defense, but she could not stand being on death row—where she had been for ten years at that point—and wanted to die.

== Death row and execution ==
=== Death row ===
Wuornos was incarcerated at the Broward Correctional Institution (BCI) death row for women, then transferred to the Florida State Prison for execution. Her appeal to the U.S. Supreme Court was denied in 1996. In a 2001 petition to the Florida Supreme Court, she stated her intention to dismiss her legal counsel and terminate all pending appeals. "I killed those men", she wrote, "robbed them as cold as ice. And I'd do it again, too. There's no chance in keeping me alive or anything, because I'd kill again. I have hate crawling through my system ... I am so sick of hearing this 'she's crazy' stuff. I've been evaluated so many times. I'm competent, sane, and I'm trying to tell the truth. I'm one who seriously hates human life and would kill again." While her attorneys argued that she was not mentally competent to make such a request, Wuornos insisted that she knew what she was doing, and a court-appointed panel of psychiatrists agreed.

In 2002, Wuornos began accusing prison matrons of tainting her food with dirt, saliva, and urine. She said she had overheard conversations among prison personnel "trying to get me so pushed over the brink by them I'd wind up committing suicide before the execution" and "wishing to rape me before execution". She also complained of strip searches, tight handcuffing, door kicking, frequent window checks, low water pressure, mildew on her mattress, and "cat calling ... in distaste and a pure hatred towards me". Wuornos threatened to boycott showers and food trays when certain officers were on duty. "In the meantime, my stomach's growling away and I'm taking showers through the sink of my cell." Her attorney stated that "Ms. Wuornos really just wants to have proper treatment, humane treatment until the day she's executed." He added, "She believes what she's written".

In the weeks before her execution, Wuornos gave a series of interviews to documentarian Nick Broomfield and talked about "being taken away to meet God and Jesus and the angels and whatever is beyond the beyond". In her final interview, she once again charged that her mind was "tortured" at BCI, and her head crushed by "sonic pressure". Food poisonings and other abuses worsened, she said, each time she complained, to make her appear insane, or to drive her insane. She also turned on her interviewer: "You sabotaged my ass! Society, and the cops, and the system! A raped woman got executed, and was used for books and movies and shit!" She also went on to call the mainstream media “an inhumane bunch of fucking living bastards and bitches” and also mentioned that she believed “a rock would nuke them” in 2019. Her final on-camera words were "Thanks a lot, society, for railroading my ass". Dawn Botkins, a childhood friend of Wuornos, later told Broomfield that her verbal abuse was directed at society and the media in general, not at him specifically.

=== Execution and death ===
Wuornos' execution by a lethal injection cocktail of sodium thiopental, pancuronium bromide, and potassium chloride took place on October 9, 2002. She declined her last meal which could have been anything under $20 and instead received a cup of coffee. Her last words were, "Yes, I would just like to say I'm sailing with the rock, and I'll be back, like Independence Day, with Jesus. June 6, like the movie. Big mother ship and all, I'll be back, I'll be back". She died at 9:47 a.m. She was the second woman in Florida and the tenth in the United States to be executed since the 1976 United States Supreme Court decision restoring capital punishment.

After her death, Wuornos' body was cremated. Wuornos' ashes were scattered beneath a tree in her native Michigan by Wuornos' childhood friend Dawn Botkins. At Wuornos' request, Natalie Merchant's song "Carnival" from Merchant's album Tigerlily (1995) was played at Wuornos' funeral. Wuornos spent many hours listening to this album on death row. When Merchant found out about this, she gave permission to use the song in the closing credits of Broomfield's documentary Aileen: Life and Death of a Serial Killer (2003):

When director Nick Broomfield sent a working edit of the film, I was so disturbed by the subject matter that I couldn't even watch it. Aileen Wuornos led a tortured, torturing life that is beyond my worst nightmares. It wasn't until I was told that Aileen spent many hours listening to my album Tigerlily while on death row and requested "Carnival" be played at her funeral that I gave permission for the use of the song. It's very odd to think of the places my music can go once it leaves my hands. If it gave her some solace, I have to be grateful.

Broomfield later speculated on Wuornos' state of mind and motives:

I think this anger developed inside her. And she was working as a prostitute. I think she had a lot of awful encounters on the roads. And I think this anger just spilled out from inside her. And finally exploded. Into incredible violence. That was her way of surviving. I think Aileen really believed that she had killed in self-defense. I think someone who's deeply psychotic can't really tell the difference between something that is life threatening and something that is a minor disagreement, that you could say something that she didn't agree with. She would get into a screaming black temper about it. And I think that's what had caused these things to happen. And at the same time, when she wasn't in those extreme moods, there was an incredible humanity to her.

== Psychopathological profile ==
According to some specialists, Wuornos' crimes have been related to her psychopathic personality and her traumatic past. Assessed using the Psychopathy Checklist, Wuornos scored 32/40 with the cutoff score of 30 for determining psychopathy.

According to Brice Arrigo, Wuornos' childhood sexual abuse and being forced into sexual labor irrevocably damaged her, and it could be seen that traumatic experiences throughout most of her young life could play a part in Wuornos' psychological state, including her biological mother's departure as well as her grandmother ignoring the abuse she endured from her grandfather, thus leading to the lack of development of a "mother–daughter" bond for Wuornos as a young girl. The damage was then made worse because both Wuornos and her brother believed that their grandparents were their biological parents, but at the age of 11 they learned that this was not the case.

Wuornos was also known to have early behavioral problems such as having an explosive temper which limited her ability to make friends, as well as making it increasingly difficult for her to maintain relationships. Her traumatic upbringing, including her physical and sexual abuse, have been partially linked to the development of her borderline personality disorder. Such severe trauma can also disrupt the structuralization of the mind at various developmental points and result in "primitive, dissociative, and splitting defenses to ward off the intensity of emotional and sexual stimulation that cannot be integrated as a child."

FBI profiler Robert Ressler briefly mentions Wuornos in his autobiographical history of his 20 years with the FBI. Writing in 1992, he said he often does not discuss female serial killers because they tend to kill in sprees instead of in a sequential fashion. He noted Wuornos as the sole exception.

== In media ==
=== Books ===
- Reynolds, Michael (1992). Dead Ends. Warner (1st ed.). ISBN 9780446362825.
- Russell, Sue (2002). Lethal Intent. Pinnacle Books. ISBN 0786015187.
- Wuornos, Aileen; Berry-Dee, Christopher (2004). Monster: My True Story. John Blake Publishing. ISBN 978-1844540792.
- Wuornos, Aileen (2012). Kester, Lisa; Gottlieb, Daphne (eds.). Dear Dawn: Aileen Wuornos in Her Own Words. Soft Skull Press. ISBN 978-1593762902.
- Chesler, Phyllis (2020). Requiem for a Female Serial Killer. World Encounter Institute/New English Review Press. ISBN 978-1943003426.

Other works

- The poem "Sugar Zero" by Rima Banerji (appears in the 2005 Arsenal Pulp Press publication Red Light: Superheroes, Saints, and Sluts).
- The poem "Aileen Wuornos" by Doron Braunshtein (appears in his 2011 spoken word CD The Obsessive Poet).
- The book Life of the Party (2019): the poet Olivia Gatwood refers to Wuornos throughout her book.

=== Documentaries ===
Filmmaker Nick Broomfield directed two documentaries about Wuornos:

- Aileen Wuornos: The Selling of a Serial Killer (1992)
- Aileen: Life and Death of a Serial Killer (2003)

Wuornos was the subject of episodes of the documentary TV series American Justice, Biography and Deadly Women. She was also featured in an episode of the TV series The New Detectives (season 3, episode 1: "Fatal Compulsion").

An episode of Murder Made Me Famous on the Reelz television network, airing December 1, 2018, chronicled the case. In February 2020, the series Very Scary People was shown on the Crime & Investigation; episodes 3 and 4 describes how the investigation into Wuornos was conducted. A 2021 episode of Catching Killers from Netflix is centered around Wuornos: the 40-minute episode is titled, "Manhunter: Aileen Wuornos."

The Netflix documentary film Aileen: Queen of the Serial Killers (2025) was directed by Emily Turner.

=== Films ===
The biographical drama film Monster (2003), stars Charlize Theron as Wuornos and Christina Ricci as Tyria Moore (Selby Wall in the film). The film centers on Wuornos' series of murders and her relationship with Moore. Theron won the Academy Award for Best Actress for her performance in the film.

The horror thriller film Aileen Wuornos: American Boogeywoman (2021) stars Peyton List as Wuornos. It shows a fictional version of Wuornos' marriage to Lewis Gratz Fell in 1976. The film was released via video-on-demand and on DVD.

=== Television ===
The TV movie Overkill: The Aileen Wuornos Story (1992) starred Jean Smart as Wuornos. The antagonist of the 2002 Law & Order: Special Victims Unit episode "Chameleon" — Maggie Peterson (Sharon Lawrence), a prostitute who murders her johns — is based on Wuornos.

In 2015, Lily Rabe portrayed a fictionalized version of Wuornos as part of a Halloween storyline in American Horror Story: Hotel in the fourth episode of the show's fifth season, and later in the season finale.

In 2024, episodes 2 to 8 of Cross season 1 is loosely based on Wuornos' story, featuring a character named Shannon Witmer (Eloise Mumford) who gets tortured into a Wuornos lookalike, although the show contains its usual disclaimer that the story and characters are fictional.

Sarah Paulson portrays Wuornos in several episodes of the American biographical crime anthology series Monster, Monster: The Lizzie Borden Story. The series premiered on Netflix on September 17, 2026.

=== Music ===
An operatic adaptation of Wuornos' life premiered at San Francisco's Yerba Buena Center for the Arts on June 22, 2001. Titled Wuornos, the opera was written by composer and librettist Carla Lucero, conducted by Mary Chun, and produced by the Jon Sims Center for the Performing Arts.

Several musicians have written songs about Wuornos, including Jewel ("Nicotine Love"), the New York-based metalcore band It Dies Today ("Sixth of June"), and Pablo Hasél ("Inéditas por culpa de Aileen Wuornos").

The singer Diamanda Galás recorded a live cover of the Phil Ochs song "Iron Lady", which she would often perform as a tribute to Wuornos, for her performance album Malediction and Prayer (1998).

Japanese doom metal band Church of Misery released the song "Filth Bitch Boogie (Aileen Wuornos)" on their 2004 studio album The Second Coming.

The song "The Damsel of Death" by the Puerto Rican all-female metal band Matriarch from their 2007 album Revered Unto the Ages is written from the point of view of Wuornos.

Samples of interviews with Wuornos feature prominently throughout Dragged into Sunlight's 2009 album Hatred for Mankind, and Lingua Ignota's 2017 albums All Bitches Die and Let The Evil of His Own Lips Cover Him throughout the songs "Disease of Men", "For I Am the Light (and Mine is the Only Way)", and "Holy is the Name (Of My Ruthless Axe)". Lingua Ignota's song "If the Poison Won't Take You My Dogs Will" of her 2019 album Caligula is also about Wuornos.

The song "Poor Aileen" by Superheaven, which is the final track from the 2015 album Ours Is Chrome, is written about Aileen Wuornos.

A parody cover version of Dolly Parton's song "Jolene" called "Aileen", dedicated to Wuornos, is featured on Willam Belli's third album. The music video, featuring Gigi Gorgeous portraying Wuornos, was released on November 1, 2018.

In 2019, rapper Cardi B recreated Wuornos' famous mugshot for her single "Press". In 2020, rapper Sadistik released the song "Aileen Wuornos", dedicated to the serial killer, on his Delirium EP.

The band SKYND released their song "Aileen Wuornos" in March 2025.

The song "Aileen's Headshot" featured on the album Milkmaid S/T, written by the Canadian band Milkmaid, samples interviews with Wuornos.

== Legacy ==
Wuornos' case is seen in some feminist circles as an example of battered woman syndrome deserving of some sympathy.

In an interview on Dateline, interviewer Michele Gillen asks Wuornos:

…the seventh men that you shot, did you say to yourself: “I’m out of control, I’m killing people! I need help-”

to which Wuornos notably responded:

No, no. No I thought to myself: those men are out of control. I’m sick and tired of those men out there thinking they can control us and do whatever they damn well please with our bodies! And then that they can get away with it: ‘cause it’s a male dominated society and “we’re gonna treat you the way we want to, abuse you and destroy you, it doesn’t matter to us ‘cause… we can get away with doing that.

In response to the Cornell University rape allegations, using the hashtag #WhatWouldAileenDo, some women alluded to Wuornos' actions as a response to sexual violence by men.

== See also ==
- List of people executed in Florida
- List of people executed in the United States in 2002
- List of serial killers by number of victims
- List of serial killers in the United States
- List of women executed in the United States since 1976
- Volunteer (capital punishment) – Prisoner asking for death as a punishment

== Cited sources ==
- Berry-Dee, Christopher (2003). Talking with Serial Killers: The Most Evil People in the World Tell Their Own Stories. John Blake Publishing. ISBN 978-1-904034-53-7.
- Hickey, Eric W. (1991). Serial Murderers and Their Victims. Thomson Brooks/Cole. ISBN 978-0-534-15414-1.
- Macleod, Marlee (2003). "Aileen Wuornos: Killer Who Preyed On Truck Drivers". Crime Library. Court TV. Archived from the original on April 15, 2008.
- Reynolds, Joseph Michael (2016). Dead Ends: The Pursuit, Conviction, and Execution of Serial Killer Aileen Wuornos. Open Road Media (re-publiсation, electronic book). ISBN 978-1-5040-3866-9.
- Reynolds, Michael (2004). Dead Ends: The Pursuit, Conviction and Execution of Female Serial Killer Aileen Wuornos, the Damsel of Death. St. Martin's Press (re-publiсation). ISBN 0-312-98418-9.
- Russell, Sue (2002). Lethal Intent. Pinnacle Books. ISBN 0-7860-1518-7.
- Wuornos, Aileen; Berry-Dee, Christopher (2004). Monster: My True Story. John Blake Publishing. ISBN 978-1-84454-079-2.

Executions carried out in Florida
Preceded by Rigoberto Sanchez-Velasco October 2, 2002	Aileen Wuornos; October 9, 2002	Succeeded by Linroy Bottoson December 9, 2002
Executions carried out in the United States
Preceded by Rigoberto Sanchez-Velasco – Florida October 2, 2002	Aileen Wuornos – Florida; October 9, 2002	Succeeded by William Howard Putman – Georgia November 13, 2002
Women executed in the United States
Preceded by Lynda Lyon Block – Alabama May 10, 2002	Aileen Wuornos – Florida; October 9, 2002	Succeeded by Frances Newton – Texas September 14, 2005
