= Howell Emanuel Donaldson III =

Serial killer

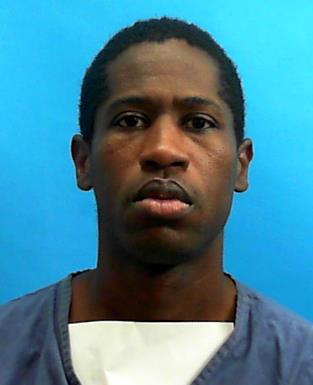
- Donaldson in a 2025 prison photograph
- Born: January 26, 1993 (age 33); Charlotte, North Carolina, U.S.
- Other name: Seminole Heights serial killer
- Conviction: First degree murder (4 counts)
- Penalty: Life imprisonment

Details
- Victims: 4
- Span of crimes: October 9 – November 14, 2017
- Country: United States
- State: Florida
- Date apprehended: November 28, 2017
- Imprisoned at: Avon Park Correctional Institution

Howell Emanuel "Trai" Donaldson III (born January 26, 1993) is a serial killer who was convicted of the 2017 murders of three men and one woman around the Seminole Heights neighborhood of Tampa, Florida. All four victims were shot dead seemingly at random. Prior to his arrest, the media called the killer the Seminole Heights serial killer.

On November 28, 2017, police arrested Donaldson after he handed a pistol in a bag to his manager at the McDonald's where he worked and instructed her to bury the bag without opening it. Subsequent investigation revealed that the pistol may have fired the bullets used in the killings and that Donaldson's cell phone had been in the vicinity of the killings at the relevant times, while a search of Donaldson's vehicle found clothing similar to that seen in surveillance footage of the killing.

On that basis, police charged Donaldson with four counts of murder. Donaldson stated that the pistol belonged to him but did not state whether he had committed the killings. Donaldson was indicted on the charges on December 7, 2017. He pleaded not guilty to all charges five days later.

On January 23, 2018, Hillsborough State Attorney Andrew Warren announced his office would seek the death penalty against Donaldson. Donaldson's trial was set for August 2023. On May 1, 2023, Donaldson pleaded guilty in the murders and was sentenced to four consecutive life sentences without parole.

== Early life ==
Donaldson was born to Howell Donaldson Jr. and Rosita Donaldson in Charlotte, North Carolina, in 1993. He graduated from Alonso High School in Tampa, and began attending St. John's University in New York City in 2011. In 2017, he received a bachelor's degree in sports management. From 2011 to 2012, Donaldson was a basketball player for the St. John's Red Storm men's basketball.

== Victims ==
=== Benjamin Edward Mitchell ===
A man was shot and killed at about 9:00 p.m. on October 9, 2017, as he was waiting at a bus stop near North 15th Street and East Frierson Avenue in the Seminole Heights neighborhood. The victim was identified as Benjamin Edward Mitchell, a 22-year-old African American man. He is the first-known victim, chronologically, of the serial killer. Mitchell had left his home about a block away and was on his way to see his girlfriend.

=== Monica Caridad Hoffa ===
On the morning of October 13, a city landscape crew was about to mow an overgrown field in the 1000 block of East New Orleans Avenue when they stumbled upon a body. The victim, later identified as Monica Caridad Hoffa, a 32-year-old white woman, was shot dead while walking to a friend's home. The shooting is believed to have happened late on October 11 or sometime on October 12. Police said there was no clear connection between Hoffa and Mitchell, the first victim. Her body was found a half mile from where Mitchell was killed.

=== Anthony Naiboa ===
A 20-year-old Hispanic man with autism was shot dead at about 7:57 p.m. on October 19, on 15th Street near Wilder Avenue. Anthony Naiboa ended up in the area after taking the wrong bus home from work. He was walking toward a Route 9 stop when he was shot in the head and killed on the sidewalk.

=== Ronald Felton ===
At about 4:50 a.m. on November 14, a 60-year-old man was crossing North Nebraska Avenue just north of East Caracas Street when the suspect came up behind him and fatally shot him. The victim, identified as Ronald Felton, was walking to the New Seasons Apostolic Ministries to meet the pastor to get ready to distribute food to families in need. He had been a volunteer at the food bank for more than a decade.

== Community response ==
On October 13, police deduced that the murders of Mitchell and Hoffa were connected based on ballistic evidence showing bullets from both victims came from the same Glock handgun. They increased patrols in the area and issued a statement urging people to not walk alone at night. Except for a grainy security cam video of a man in a hoodie, Tampa police had very few leads, and no suspects.

On October 31, 2017, over 50 police officers were stationed in the Seminole Heights area, as well as Tampa's then-interim police chief Brian Dugan and Tampa Mayor Bob Buckhorn, to ensure a safe night of trick-or-treating for the community's youth. Troopers from the Florida Highway Patrol (FHP), Hillsborough County sheriffs office and Tampa officers were stationed throughout the community in cars and on horseback.

== Investigation ==
Surveillance video from the murders of Mitchell and Felton showed the suspect wearing a hooded sweatshirt that was apparently light-colored, though detectives said the colors are misleading as dark colors often appear as light colors in infrared video. Furthermore, after Felton's murder, witnesses told police that the suspect was wearing all-dark clothing. At least one witness described the suspect as a black male with a light complexion and a thin build, estimated to be about 6 feet to 6 feet 2 inches tall.

The Tampa Police Department arrested a suspect, Howell Emanuel Donaldson III, on November 28, 2017, at a McDonald's fast food restaurant in Ybor City. Donaldson, who worked at the restaurant, told Delonda Walker, his manager, that he was going to an Amscot location and would leave town after securing a cash advance. He collected his paycheck, turned in his uniform, and then handed her a pistol wrapped in a paper salad bag. Donaldson instructed Walker to tell anybody who asks that she hasn't seen him, not to open the bag, and to bury the bag somewhere deep enough where it wouldn't be accidentally found. He claimed that the bag was involved in his mother's final wish, in a failed attempt to prevent his manager from looking in the bag. Walker notified a Tampa Police Officer who was eating in the restaurant. The officer notified others who were involved in the investigation and arrested Donaldson prior to him walking back into the restaurant.

Donaldson consented to a search of his vehicle, where Tampa police found clothes stained with what appeared to be blood and fitting the description derived from security footage and eyewitness accounts. They also discovered that his cell phone location data aligned with the date, time, and location of that provided in the security footage. Tampa police claim that ballistics tests show that Donaldson's 40-caliber Glock was used to commit all four killings, and that shell casings matching the weapon were found at the scenes of the crimes.

His trial was scheduled to begin on August 10, 2020, but a judge granted a defense motion for Donaldson to be tried for each murder separately, citing the different circumstances surrounding each victim. In April 2022, the Florida Second District Court of Appeal ruled that evidence of all four murders was admissible in each trial pursuant to the Williams Rule. If found guilty, Donaldson could have faced the death penalty. On May 1, 2023, Donaldson pleaded guilty in the murders and was sentenced to four consecutive life sentences without parole. Delonda Walker was given the $110,000 reward for providing information leading to the arrest of the alleged serial killer.

== See also ==
- List of serial killers in the United States
