= St. Cecilia: The Elektra Recordings =

Compilation album by the Stalk–Forrest Group

Compilation album by the Stalk–Forrest Group
- Released: April 23, 2001, but see text
- Recorded: February – May 1970
- Studio: Elektra, New York City; Elektra, Los Angeles
- Genre: Psychedelic rock
- Label: Elektra, Rhino
- Producer: Dennis Murphy, Peter Seigel, Jay Lee

Blue Öyster Cult chronology
Heaven Forbid (1998)	St. Cecilia: The Elektra Recordings (2001)	Curse of the Hidden Mirror (2001)

Singles from St. Cecilia: The Elektra Recordings
- 1. ""What is Quicksand?" / "Arthur Comics"" Released: July 20, 1970

St. Cecilia: The Elektra Recordings is a compilation album consisting of recordings by the American rock band the Stalk–Forrest Group, (Note: Sources are inconsistent as to whether to use "the", or a hyphen, dash, or space as a separator. For consistency and euphony, this article uses "the" and a dash, consistent with how the band's name is displayed on the single release of "What is Quicksand?") who would later be known as Blue Öyster Cult. It is a combination of two albums recorded by the group for Elektra Records – one in 1969 and the other in 1970 – as well as the promotional single "What is Quicksand?" released in 1970. Except for the single, the tracks were not officially released until 2001, although bootlegs had existed and individual tracks had been released as bonus tracks to other albums.

The band had originated as "Soft White Underbelly" (Note: Sources are inconsistent as to whether to use "the". For consistency and euphony, this article omits it.) in 1967 but went through several names under its creative director Sandy Pearlman. Soft White Underbelly had recorded demos for Elektra with its original lead vocalist Les Braunstein, and re-recorded them with new vocalist Eric Bloom in 1969, the re-recordings with Bloom forming the first half of the compilation album. Elektra, who had liked Braunstein, declined to release the album with Bloom despite its completion and mixing. In an effort to get Elektra to reconsider its position, Pearlman and the band – now named "Oaxaca" – traveled from their native New York to California in early 1970 to record more sessions, which form the second half of the compilation album, but the label was losing patience with the band and ended the contract. Despite these failures, the band – now the "Stalk–Forrest Group" – released a single for the label in July 1970.

The band continued to struggle without a recording contract, and under more names, for the next year. Columbia Records, which had rejected the band multiple times in the past, saw the need to compete with the likes of Black Sabbath, and promised Pearlman a contract for the band if it could change its sound to that end. The band, which had already started going towards a heavier direction, rehearsed new material and signed the contract in autumn 1971 under the name "Blue Öyster Cult". With this contract, the band recorded and released a true debut album in 1972, and would go on to find success in the metal scene in the next decades.

== History ==
=== Band formation ===
Albert Bouchard and Donald Roeser met in college in 1965 in Potsdam, New York, and began playing together in several bands, with Roeser on guitar – having taken it up as physical therapy after breaking his arm – and Bouchard on drums. The two eventually dropped out of college but continued to play gigs throughout upstate New York, except for a brief stint of Bouchard playing for another band in Chicago.

The band that would become the Stalk–Forrest Group was the brainchild of Sandy Pearlman, a student of Stony Brook University in Long Island. Pearlman had heard Roeser jam with his band in a common building on the campus of Stony Brook and offered to be their manager. The band – known as "Soft White Underbelly" in reference to a speech by Winston Churchill regarding Nazi-held Italy during World War II – included Bouchard and Roeser, as well as keyboardist Allen Lanier, bassist Andy Winters, and vocalist and frontman Les Braunstein. Bouchard would retrospectively call Soft White Underbelly's music "more of a Grateful Dead type thing, [with the band] developing [their] improvisational skills and songwriting abilities," whereas Roeser would credit Pearlman for giving him motivation to play rock on a professional level. The songwriting of the band was largely left to Bouchard; Lanier; Pearlman; and Richard Meltzer, a rock critic as well as childhood friend and classmate of Pearlman's. Winters also contributed some material, as did Braunstein.

Braunstein's talents were increasingly at odds with the band's desired metal direction; tensions also grew with Braunstein taking unnecessary time recording his vocals and insisting on his compositions being recorded. Braunstein was delinquent on payments of his Volkswagen van, which the band used, and upon its repossession in April 1969 the band turned to Eric Bloom. Bloom was a classmate of Braunstein's at Hobart College, and already an acclaimed rock singer in the Finger Lakes region; having been a stage engineer for the band since November 1968, his position was helped by having a van already paid off and complete with a sound system, as well as dealing drugs to the band. Even after Bloom was chosen to replace Braunstein, the band auditioned Pearlman and Meltzer for singing; despite the lack of success in such auditions, Meltzer sang for the band on one occasion. After Bloom's entry, the band began changing names and concepts frequently.

=== Recording and single release ===
Soft White Underbelly recorded a demo album for Elektra Records with Braunstein; Meltzer recalled the experience negatively, accusing Braunstein of "[finding] any way he could to destroy what they were doing because he was a fool" and blaming him for the demo album's never being mixed. Nevertheless, Elektra signed the group in January 1969. One of the band's supporters in the label was Jac Holzman, who had attended a show at the Diplomat Hotel. After Braunstein's departure, the group re-recorded the songs in New York with Bloom. The ten-song album was turned in to Elektra completed, mixed and mastered, ready for release, but was rejected. A source of the rift between the label and the band was Braunstein, whom the label liked despite his issues with the band.

The band recorded new demos of several of the songs for Columbia Records in hopes of scoring a record deal; some of these Columbia demos eventually surfaced as bonus tracks on the re-mastered version of the first Blue Öyster Cult album in 2001. After being rejected by Columbia as well, Pearlman convinced Elektra to give the band another shot, and the group traveled to California in February 1970 to begin reworking and re-recording the songs for a full-length album release. Meanwhile, the band had changed its name to Oaxaca, and would soon change it again to the Stalk–Forrest Group; the latter name being inspired by Chinese food. By the time of the California sessions, however, Elektra distrusted the band and believed it was using the label for money – the band had received $70,000 ($490,000 in 2021) at this point – and, not liking the final album, ended the contract. Pearlman made a final effort to release a single for Elektra, who sent out representative Don Galucci to New York to record it. Winters decided to abandon the band in favor of his work and failed to appear at this point, leading to his replacement by Bouchard's brother Joe.

The band decided to release "What is Quicksand?", despite Galucci's suggestion to release the less-psychedelic "Gil Blanco County" instead. Pearlman also did not want to release the album during the summer so delayed Holzman a track listing; in retrospect, however, Pearlman was of the opinion that the label did not like the album no matter the other factors straining the relationship.

=== Subsequent history of Blue Öyster Cult ===
With its lineup solidified, the band continued to cycle through such names as "the Santos Sisters", and continued to try getting a record deal. Murray Krugman, a product manager for Columbia, had rejected the band twice previously, but had come around to the idea that Columbia needed an answer to Warner's Black Sabbath, promising Pearlman a contract if the band could change its music to that effect. Pearlman and Krugman rehearsed with the band for around a month to create the appropriate music. Nevertheless, the band still did not have a name.

The band renamed themselves Blue Öyster Cult, and finally secured a solid recording contract with Columbia in Fall 1971.

=== Bootlegs and official release ===
The recordings surfaced as a bootleg in the late 1990s. Confusingly, the bootleg was titled Curse of the Hidden Mirrors, after a song on the Elektra album, but Curse of the Hidden Mirror was eventually used as the title of a Blue Öyster Cult studio album in 2001.

The untitled "California" Elektra album was finally released officially in 2001, along with the previously unreleased original '69 sessions, as St. Cecilia: The Elektra Recordings by Rhino Entertainment in a limited, numbered edition of 5000 copies. It is now out of print. This same release was reissued in 2013 by Wounded Bird Records and is also now out of print. Inferior "bootleg" versions of the album with a shuffled track listing are available as grey-area releases, such as St. Cecilia: The California Album on Radioactive Records (not the real Radioactive label, but a grey area label using the same name). These releases are not made from the original master tapes like the Rhino/Wounded Bird release.

== Music ==
The first nine tracks on the compilation album are from the 1969-recorded demo album EKS-74046, while the following seven are from the California sessions and the last two are from the single release of "What is Quicksand?". The majority of songs on the compilation therefore appear twice.

=== "What is Quicksand?" ===
The opening track of the compilation is the EKS-74046 recording of "What is Quicksand?". This differs both from the version released as a single (also included in the compilation) and from another demo released as part of a reissue of the 1972 album.

=== "I'm on the Lamb" ===
The song "I'm on the Lamb" was re-recorded under the title "I'm on the Lamb but I Ain't no Sheep" for Blue Öyster Cult's first proper album Blue Öyster Cult in 1971. It was re-worked and recorded again for the Tyranny & Mutation album (1973), under the title "The Red and the Black".

=== "Gil Blanco County" ===
The very last part of the song "Gil Blanco County" would later re-emerge at the end of "(Don't Fear) The Reaper" on the popular live album Some Enchanted Evening (1978). The bridge from "Gil Blanco County" was used as the main development section in "Buck's Boogie," although the progression is in D rather than Db in "Buck's Boogie."

=== "Curse of the Hidden Mirrors" ===
This title would be recycled for albums. Especially Albert Bouchard's Imaginos Act III: The Mutant Reformation

=== "St. Cecilia" ===
The titular track, predominantly written by Winters, is a ballad, and would be referenced by Richie Castellano in The Return Of St. Cecilia on 2020's The Symbol Remains.

=== Other songs ===
- The chord changes for "Arthur Comics" were recycled for the instrumental "Buck's Boogie", released on the 1975 live album On Your Feet or on Your Knees.
- Demo versions of three songs from this album ("What Is Quicksand?", "Donovan's Monkey" and "A Fact About Sneakers"), appear on the remastered CD of the album Blue Öyster Cult, as does a cover of the Bobby Freeman tune "Betty Lou's Got a New Pair of Shoes". Another song from these sessions, "John L. Sullivan", was released on the 2001 promo-only CD "God Save Blue Oyster Cult From Themselves". It was also included in the 2012 Blue Öyster Cult box set that compiles all the band's output during their time at Columbia. All were recorded as demos for Columbia Records in 1969.
- The tracks intended for the Stalk–Forrest Group's debut album (EKS-74046) were reissued on 15 October 2017 by Australian label Blank Recording Co. under the title The Stalk–Forrest Group.

== Reception ==
Professional ratings
Review scores
Source	Rating
Allmusic	3/5 stars
Allmusic	4.5/5 stars

== Track listing ==
1. "What Is Quicksand?" (Allen Lanier, Richard Meltzer) – 3:19
2. "I'm on the Lamb" (Eric Bloom, Albert Bouchard, Sandy Pearlman) – 3:00
3. "Gil Blanco County" (Lanier, Pearlman) – 3:37
4. "Donovan's Monkey" (Bouchard, Meltzer) – 3:44
5. "Ragamuffin Dumplin'" (Bouchard, Meltzer) – 5:12
6. "Curse of the Hidden Mirrors" (Bouchard, Meltzer) – 3:17
7. "Arthur Comics" (Bouchard, Meltzer) – 3:11
8. "A Fact About Sneakers" (Bouchard, Meltzer) – 7:53
9. "St. Cecilia" (Andrew Winters, Bouchard, Pearlman) – 6:48
10. "Ragamuffin Dumplin'" (alternate mix) (Bouchard, Meltzer) – 5:19
11. "I'm on the Lamb" (alternate take) (Bloom, Bouchard, Pearlman) – 2:54
12. "Curse of the Hidden Mirrors" (alternate mix) (Bouchard, Meltzer) – 3:17
13. "Bonomo's Turkish Taffy" (deleted from final album) (Bouchard, Meltzer) – 2:14
14. "Gil Blanco County" (alternate mix) (Lanier, Pearlman) – 3:37
15. "St. Cecilia" (alternate mix) (Bouchard, Pearlman, Winters) – 6:47
16. "A Fact About Sneakers" (alternate take) (Bouchard, Meltzer) – 3:10
17. "What Is Quicksand?" (mono single mix) (Lanier, Meltzer) – 3:21
18. "Arthur Comics" (mono single mix) (Bouchard, Meltzer) – 3:10
- Tracks 1–9 are the finished, but unreleased and untitled Elektra album EKS-74046
- Tracks 10–16 taken from earlier version of the unreleased album labeled "OAXACA"
- Tracks 17 and 18 are from the Elektra promo single EKM-45693, released July 20, 1970

== Personnel ==
- Eric Bloom a.k.a. "Jesse Python" – lead vocals, guitars
- Donald Roeser a.k.a. "Buck Dharma" – lead guitar, vocals
- Andrew Winters a.k.a. "Andy Panda" – bass, acoustic guitar on "St. Cecilia." Mr. Winters was never called "Andy Panda," at least not to his face. Guild acoustic guitar played by Andrew Winters courtesy of Jackson Browne.
- Allen Lanier a.k.a. "La Verne" – keyboards, guitar
- Albert Bouchard a.k.a. "Prince Omega" – drums, vocals

The nicknames in quotes were given to the band members by manager Sandy Pearlman. Nearly all of the members hated the nicknames, with the exception of Donald Roeser, who continues to use "Buck Dharma" as his stage name.

== Works cited ==
- Popoff, Martin (2004). Blue Öyster Cult: Secrets Revealed!. Simi Valley, California: Metal Blade Records, Inc. ISBN 0-9752807-0-8 – via Internet Archive.
