= Guitar Hero III (disambiguation) =

Guitar Hero III: Legends of Rock is a video game. It may also refer to:

- Guitar Hero III Mobile
- Guitar Hero III: Backstage Pass
- Guitar Hero III: Legends of Rock Companion Pack
