= Phoenix Show Palace =

Sports venue in Phoenix, Arizona, US

Coordinates: 33.4937°N 112.1417°W

- Interactive map of Phoenix Show Palace
- Former names: Phoenix Coliseum (1956-74)
- Address: 3839 W Indian School Rd; Phoenix, AZ 85019-3519
- Capacity: 8,800

Construction
- Opened: September 28, 1956
- Closed: 1961-74; 1975

The Phoenix Show Palace (formerly the Phoenix Coliseum) was an indoor ice skating rink and multipurpose venue for trade shows, concerts and sporting events in Phoenix, Arizona, US.

The inaugural event at the Phoenix Coliseum was a Bob Hope Concert on September 28, 1956. Several other concerts, trade shows and sporting events were held at the Phoenix Coliseum before it ran into financial problems, the final concert to be held before bankruptcy was the June 2, 1957 concert by Frank Sinatra. Plagued by several problems the coliseum never reached its intended potential; poor acoustics, difficult street access and finally a lack of air conditioning condemned the facility to failure. By June 25, 1957 the Phoenix Coliseum filed for bankruptcy. For a period of time after declaring bankruptcy, concerts and other events continued to be held at the Phoenix Coliseum. By 1961 the Phoenix Coliseum had been converted to discount retail space.

In September 1974, the site of the former Phoenix Coliseum had reverted from retail space to a concert, sporting and event hall venue and was renamed "Phoenix Show Palace" and was also known as "The Show Palace". The Phoenix Show Palace lasted 6 months and was not used as a concert or event hall after March 1975. The stated capacity of The Show Palace was 8,800. Live rock concerts, closed-circuit TV and live boxing matches along with open to the public free lectures and a trade show were held at this venue, as they were when the venue was The Phoenix Coliseum. The final advertisement for the Phoenix Show Palace was for a March 31, 1975 boxing match.

Blue Öyster Cult recorded part of their live album "On Your Feet or On Your Knees" at the Phoenix Show Palace 14 October 1974 in a triple bill of Golden Earring, T. Rex and Blue Öyster Cult. Album credits state that "Show Palace" Phoenix, AZ was one of seven venues used to record the live album.

The address for this venue was 3839 West Indian School Road at 38th Avenue, Phoenix, AZ.

Today, the site of the former Phoenix Coliseum/Phoenix Show Palace has reverted to retail space.
