= Aileen: Life and Death of a Serial Killer =

2003 documentary film about Aileen Wuornos

- DVD cover
- Directed by: Nick Broomfield; Joan Churchill
- Written by: Nick Broomfield
- Produced by: Jo Human
- Starring: Nick Broomfield; Aileen Wuornos; Jeb Bush; Louis Mason
- Cinematography: Joan Churchill
- Edited by: Claire Ferguson
- Music by: Robert Lane
- Release date: May 10, 2003
- Running time: 89 minutes
- Language: English

Aileen: Life and Death of a Serial Killer is a 2003 feature-length documentary film about Aileen Wuornos, made by Nick Broomfield as a follow-up to his 1992 film Aileen Wuornos: The Selling of a Serial Killer. The film focuses on Wuornos' declining mental state and the questionable judgment to execute her despite her being of unsound mind.

== Synopsis ==
The film focuses on an evidentiary hearing held in February 2003 in Marion County, Florida, which was the site of some but not all of Wuornos' murders for which she was convicted and sentenced to death. It shows the work of the Office of Capital Collateral Regional counsel, led by attorney Joseph T. Hobson, who is both interviewed and featured in the film and who seeks to vacate Wuornos' death sentences. It shows Judge Victor Musleh presiding over these proceedings and assistant state attorney, now judge, James McCune, who defended the death sentences for the State of Florida. Hobson is shown vigorously cross-examining Wuornos' trial counsel, Steven Glazer, aka "Dr. Legal". Glazer was the unflattering subject of a prior Broomfield documentary on Aileen Wuornos, Aileen Wuornos: The Selling of a Serial Killer. It was Hobson's line of attack that the efficacy of his client's (Wuornos') trial strategy was compromised by Glazer's pecuniary and self-promotional aims.

The film climaxes in a final interview with Wuornos one day before her execution. In the interview, she states that she was tortured while in prison and claims that the prison used "sonic pressure" to control or alter her mental state. In a fit of rage, Wuornos rails against a society that she says "railroaded my ass" before abruptly ending the interview. Broomfield comments that he finds it hard to understand how the same person in front of him was deemed "of sound mind" the day before by Florida governor Jeb Bush's psychiatric examiners.

The film concludes with footage of a prison spokesman reading Wuornos' final statement at a press conference after her execution: "I'm sailing with the Rock, and I'll be back. Like Independence Day with Jesus, June 6, like the movie, big mothership and all. I'll be back, I'll be back."

== Reception ==
=== Box office ===
The film received a limited theatrical release in North America several weeks after the Aileen Wuornos biopic Monster opened to generally positive reviews. Released on January 9, 2004, on three screens, Aileen grossed $16,158 (an average of $5,386 per screen) in its opening weekend. Playing in six theaters at its widest point, its total North American box office gross stands at just $97,362.

=== Critical response ===
On the review aggregator website Rotten Tomatoes, 85% of 61 critics' reviews are positive, with an average rating of 7.3/10. The website's consensus reads: "This chilling, unsettling documentary provides an eye-opening look at both Wuornos and the American justice system." The documentary holds a 7.1/10 weighted rating based on 6.9k reviews on IMDb.

== See also ==
- Aileen Wuornos: The Selling of a Serial Killer
