= Leger Douzable =

American football player (born 1986)

No. 69, 78, 91, 92
- Position: Defensive end

Personal information
- Born: May 31, 1986 (age 40); Tampa, Florida, U.S.
- Listed height: 6 ft 4 in (1.93 m)
- Listed weight: 284 lb (129 kg)

Career information
- High school: Braulio Alonso (Tampa)
- College: UCF
- NFL draft: 2008: undrafted

Career history
- Minnesota Vikings (2008)*; New York Giants (2008–2009); St. Louis Rams (2009); Detroit Lions (2010)*; Jacksonville Jaguars (2010–2011); Tennessee Titans (2012); New York Jets (2013–2015); Buffalo Bills (2016); San Francisco 49ers (2017)
- * Offseason or practice squad member only

Awards and highlights
- Third-team All-Conference USA (2006)

Career NFL statistics
- Total tackles: 178
- Sacks: 8.5
- Fumble recoveries: 1
- Pass deflections: 2
- Stats at Pro Football Reference

Leger Douzable Jr. (born May 31, 1986) is an American sports commentator and former football player. He played professionally as a defensive end in the National Football League (NFL).

Douzable played college football for the UCF Knights. He was signed by the Minnesota Vikings as an undrafted free agent in 2008. Douzable was also a member of the New York Giants, St. Louis Rams, Detroit Lions, Jacksonville Jaguars, Tennessee Titans, New York Jets, Buffalo Bills, and San Francisco 49ers.

== Early life ==
He was a 2-year letter winner at Alonso High School in Tampa, Florida. As a senior, he finished with 50 tackles and 10 sacks and also returned an interception for a touchdown along with blocking two field goals and forcing two fumbles. He was a second-team All-County selection as a senior.

== College career ==
Douzable ended his 2007 season with 49 tackles and seven sacks, bringing his career totals to 102 tackles and 14 sacks and was awarded first-team All-Conference USA. In 2006, he made nine starts and saw action in all 12 games, splitting time between defensive tackle and defensive end. He was third-team All-Conference USA after leading the team with seven sacks and 10½ tackles for loss. In 2005, he played in 12 games, including one start as a sophomore, and ended the season with 17 tackles and two tackles for loss. In 2004, he played in all 11 games as a true freshman at defensive tackle and ended the season with four total tackles.

== Professional career ==
=== Minnesota Vikings ===
Douzable began his rookie season on the Minnesota Vikings' practice squad until being waived on September 8, 2008.

=== New York Giants ===
Douzable signed to the New York Giants' practice squad on September 11, 2008, and spent the majority of the season there before joining the Giants’ active roster (December 3) and inactive for the Giants over the final four games of the 2008 regular season and the NFC Divisional Playoff. He was released in September 2009.

=== St. Louis Rams ===
On September 17, 2009, Douzable was signed to the practice squad by the St. Louis Rams; he was promoted to the active roster on September 30. For the 2009 season, he played in 12 games (including one start), posting 16 tackles (11 solo), including five tackles for loss to tie for second-most on the team and also had four quarterback hits.

The Rams waived Douzable on June 28, 2010.

=== Detroit Lions ===
Douzable was claimed off waivers by the Detroit Lions on June 29, 2010. He was waived by the Lions on August 4.

=== Jacksonville Jaguars ===
Douzable was signed by the Jacksonville Jaguars on August 8, 2010, and made the team's 53-man Opening Day roster. In 15 games during the 2010 season, Douzable made eight tackles. He played 16 games (starting six) in 2011, recording 38 tackles, one sack, and one pass defended.

=== New York Jets ===
Douzable was signed by the New York Jets on July 25, 2013. Douzable played in every game for the Jets over three seasons and saw a good amount of playing time as a reserve on the team's defensive line doing most of his work as a run-stopper and recording 59 tackles and four sacks over those 48 games with the Jets.

=== Buffalo Bills ===
Douzable was signed by the Buffalo Bills on June 13, 2016.

=== San Francisco 49ers ===
Douzable was signed by the San Francisco 49ers on August 14, 2017 He was released by San Francisco on September 1. The 49ers re-signed Douzable on October 17.

== NFL career statistics ==
Legend
**Bold**	Career high

Year	Team	Games		Tackles					Interceptions					Fumbles			
Year	Team	GP	GS	Cmb	Solo	Ast	Sck	TFL	Int	Yds	TD	Lng	PD	FF	FR	Yds	TD
2009	STL	12	1	11	11	0	0.0	5	0	0	0	0	0	0	0	0	0
2010	JAX	15	0	8	5	3	0.0	1	0	0	0	0	0	0	0	0	0
2011	JAX	**16**	**6**	38	22	16	1.0	**6**	0	0	0	0	**1**	0	0	0	0
2013	NYJ	**16**	0	20	5	15	1.5	2	0	0	0	0	0	0	**1**	0	0
2014	NYJ	**16**	0	25	14	11	**2.5**	2	0	0	0	0	0	0	0	0	0
2015	NYJ	**16**	2	14	10	4	0.0	2	0	0	0	0	0	0	0	0	0
2016	BUF	**16**	5	**43**	**24**	**19**	1.5	5	0	0	0	0	**1**	0	0	0	0
2017	SFO	5	5	19	17	2	2.0	3	0	0	0	0	0	0	0	0	0
Total		112	19	178	108	70	8.5	26	0	0	0	0	2	0	1	0	0

== Broadcasting career ==
Douzable first started reporting for SportsNet New York from 2013 to 2022 and also worked for Madison Square Garden Entertainment from 2016 to 2017. In May 2018, CBS Sports hired him to work as a broadcaster and sports analyst. He has made several appearances on NFL on CBS as well as a color commentator for games on ESPN and CBS Sports. He is the host of "I Am Athlete Tonight" on Mad Dog Sports Radio Channel 82 on SiriusXM.

== Personal life ==
Douzable's biological father is of Haitian descent.
