= Aileen: Queen of the Serial Killers =

2025 documentary film on Aileen Wuornos

- Directed by: Emily Turner
- Edited by: Jinx Godfrey; Daniel Lapira
- Music by: Dickon Hinchliffe
- Distributed by: Netflix
- Release date: October 30, 2025
- Running time: 104 minutes
- Country: United States
- Language: English

Aileen: Queen of the Serial Killers is a 2025 American documentary film, which explores the story of serial killer Aileen Wuornos. It is directed by Emily Turner. It was released on Netflix on October 30, 2025.
