= Braulio Alonso High School =

Location
- 8302 Montague Street; Tampa, Florida 33635; United States; 28°01′19″N 82°36′10″W

Information
- Type: Public secondary
- Established: 2001
- School district: Hillsborough County Public Schools
- NCES School ID: 120087003711
- Principal: James Harris
- Staff: 132.33 (FTE)
- Grades: 9–12
- Enrollment: 2,930 (2025–26)
- Student to teacher ratio: 24:1
- Campus: Suburban
- Colors: Navy; Gold
- Mascot: Raven
- Rival: Sickles High School
- Website: www.hillsboroughschools.org/o/alonso

Braulio Alonso High School is a public high school located in Tampa, Florida, United States. It serves grades 9–12 for the Hillsborough County Public Schools.

Alonso High is named after Braulio Alonso. He served on the board of directors in the National Education Association from 1958 to 1964, and was elected as its president in 1967, the first Hispanic to hold that office.

== International Baccalaureate Programme ==
Alonso is the fifth school in Hillsborough County to have an International Baccalaureate Programme with the other IB high schools being King, Strawberry Crest, Hillsborough, and Robinson. The program was established in the 2020–2021 school year and offers a Pre-IB curriculum for grades 9 and 10, and an IB Diploma Programme for grades 11 and 12. Alonso received the status of a full-fledged IB diploma school for the 2022–2023 school year. The first class of IB students graduated in May 2024.

== Demographics ==
- Student Diversity
  - 59.6% Hispanic
  - 25.1% White
  - 6.1% Asian
  - 6.0% Black
  - 3.0% Two or more races
  - 0.2% Native Hawaiian/Pacific Islander
  - 0.1% American Indian/Alaska Native

== School grade by year ==
Year	Grade	Year	Grade	Year	Grade	Year	Grade
2005-2006	B	2011-2012	A	2017-2018	B	2023-2024	A
2006-2007	C	2012-2013	A	2018-2019	B	2024-2025	A
2007-2008	A	2013-2014	B	2019-2020	B	2025-2026	A
2008-2009	B	2014-2015	A	2020-2021	B		
2009-2010	B	2015-2016	C	2021-2022	A		
2010-2011	B	2016-2017	B	2022-2023	B		

== Athletics ==
Alonso High School currently offers the following sports:

- Baseball
  - FHSAA's 2008-09 6A State Baseball Champions; 2010-2011 6A State Baseball Champions 2009-2010
- Football (Varsity, JV)
- Lacrosse (boys’ and girls’)
- Soccer (boys' and girls')
- Basketball (Varsity and JV, boys' and girls')
- Wrestling (boys' and girls')
- Tennis (boys' and girls')
- Swim and Dive
- Golf (boys' and girls')
- Volleyball (Varsity and JV)
- Softball
- Cross country (boys' and girls')
- Girls' flag football (Varsity and JV)
  - District Champions - 2010, 2011, 2012, 2013, 2014, 2018, 2019, 2022, 2023
  - Regional Champions - 2010, 2011, 2014, 2018, 2019, 2022, 2023
  - State Runner-Up - 2010, 2011
  - State 2A Champions 2018, 2019, 2022, 2023
- Track and Field (boys' and girls')
- Cheerleading (Varsity, JV, Competition)
- Ascent Dance Team

== Principals ==
Principal	Tenure
Dr. Sandy Bunkin	2001-2006
Louie Diaz	2006-2015
Kenneth Hart	2015-2021
James Harris	2021–present

Sandy Bunkin was the school's first principal, and retired after five years. She was replaced by Louie Diaz, who was the Assistant Principal of Athletics for the first two years the school was open, then became the principal of Jefferson High School. Both principals had buildings in the school named after them, the Sandy Bunkin Auditorium which is located near the front of the school and is where many concerts by the band and orchestra are held and the Louie Diaz Athletic Complex which is located near the football field. Kenneth Hart took over the role in 2015 followed by James Harris in 2021.

== Notable alumni ==
- Leger Douzable (2004), former NFL defensive end
- Sherman Johnson (2009), former MLB infielder
- Anthony Chickillo (2011), former NFL linebacker
- Howell Emanuel Donaldson III (2011), serial killer
- Jose Fernandez (2011), former MLB All-Star pitcher
- Alex Faedo (2014), pitcher for the Tampa Bay Rays
- Jessie Warren (2014), Athletes Unlimited Softball League pitcher
- Ryan Fernandez (2016), pitcher for the St. Louis Cardinals
- Chris Oladokun (2016 - transferred), quarterback for the Kansas City Chiefs
