= Curse of the Hidden Mirror =

Studio album by Blue Öyster Cult
- Released: June 5, 2001
- Studio: Millbrook Sound Studios, Millbrook, New York
- Genre: Hard rock; heavy metal
- Length: 50:54
- Label: CMC/Sanctuary
- Producer: Buck Dharma; Eric Bloom

Blue Öyster Cult chronology
St. Cecilia: The Elektra Recordings (2001)	Curse of the Hidden Mirror (2001)	The Symbol Remains (2020)

Professional ratings
Review scores
Source	Rating
AllMusic	3.5/5 stars
Blistering	4/5
Collector's Guide to Heavy Metal	8/10
Kerrang!	2/5 stars

Curse of the Hidden Mirror is the thirteenth studio album by American rock band Blue Öyster Cult, released on June 5, 2001. The only single from the record was the poorly received "Pocket". Lackluster sales and poor relations led to the band being dropped by their label, Sanctuary Records; as a result, BÖC did not release another studio album for nearly 20 years, until the release of The Symbol Remains in 2020.

The title of the album is taken from a song contained in the unreleased album by the Stalk-Forrest Group, the band that would later become Blue Öyster Cult, recorded in 1970.

John Shirley, an author of cyberpunk science fiction, wrote the lyrics for many songs of the album.

The song "Out of the Darkness" was originally featured in the 1992 film Bad Channels, which Blue Öyster Cult recorded the soundtrack for, although the song was not included in the soundtrack album for the movie. "Showtime" was originally written and recorded for Cultösaurus Erectus but did not make the final cut.

Curse of the Hidden Mirror is the final Blue Öyster Cult album to feature longtime keyboardist Allen Lanier, who died in 2013.

== Track listing ==
No.	Title	Writer(s)	Length
1.	"Dance on Stilts"	Donald Roeser, John Shirley	6:05
2.	"Showtime"	Eric Bloom, John Trivers	4:38
3.	"The Old Gods Return"	Bloom, Roeser, Shirley	4:36
4.	"Pocket"	Roeser, Shirley	4:15
5.	"One Step Ahead of the Devil"	Bloom, Roeser, Danny Miranda, Bobby Rondinelli, Shirley	4:16
6.	"I Just Like to Be Bad"	Bloom, Bryan Neumeister, Shirley	3:54
7.	"Here Comes That Feeling"	Roeser, Dick Trismen	3:21
8.	"Out of the Darkness"	Miranda, Bloom, Roeser, Shirley	5:06
9.	"Stone of Love"	Roeser, Richard Meltzer	5:49
10.	"Eye of the Hurricane"	Bloom, Neumeister, Roeser, Rondinelli, Shirley	4:40
11.	"Good to Feel Hungry"	Miranda, Bloom, Roeser, Shirley	4:12

== Personnel ==
=== Band members ===
- Eric Bloom – vocals (2, 3, 5, 6, 8, 10, 11), stun guitars, associate producer
- Donald 'Buck Dharma' Roeser – lead guitars, vocals (1, 4, 7, 9), producer
- Allen Lanier – rhythm guitars, keyboards, background vocals
- Danny Miranda – bass, background vocals
- Bobby Rondinelli – drums, percussion

=== Additional musicians ===
- Norman DelTufo – percussion
- George Cintron – background vocals

=== Production ===
- Paul Orofino – engineer, mixing
- Leon Zervos – mastering
