= Braulio Alonso =

- Born: December 16, 1916; Ybor City, Tampa, Florida
- Died: June 5, 2010 (aged 93); Tampa, Florida
- Education: University of Florida; University of Tampa
- Known for: Being the President of the National Education Association

Braulio Alonso (December 16, 1916 – June 5, 2010) was an American high school and junior high school teacher and principal. He served as the first Hispanic president of the National Education Association.

== Early life ==
Alonso was born in Ybor City, Tampa, Florida on December 16, 1916. His parents were both cigar makers in Ybor City and members of the Centro Asturiano social club. His first language was Spanish.

Braulio went to work at the age of 10 in order to help support his family. He graduated from Hillsborough High School as valedictorian in 1935. He graduated from the University of Tampa, also as valedictorian, in 1939.

Braulio married Adelfa (Bebe) Diaz, an elementary school educator, in August 1941. They had two children.

== Military service ==
Braulio entered the US Army in October 1941. He entered as a private and was immediately sent to Officer Candidate School. Dr. Alonso served with the 85th infantry Division in North Africa and the Italian Campaign as Battery Commander in the 328th Artillery Battalion. He was in the first group of allied officers to enter Rome. Major Alonso was discharged in November 1945. He received the Bronze Star and Purple Heart with Cluster.

== Career in education ==
Alonso began his teaching career as a chemistry and physics teacher at Henry B. Plant High School before the war. After the war, Alonso returned to public education as director of Adult Education and On the Job Training for Veterans. He pioneered the present-day Adult High School. He served as Director of this office from 1946 to 1953. During the summers he attended the University of Florida where he earned a Master's and Ph.D. At the time, he was providing also for the college education of his two sisters, as well as supporting his family.

His next assignments were as principal of West Tampa Junior High School (1952–1958), Jefferson High School (1958–1962) and C. Leon King High School (1962–1968). All three schools grew in excellence under his tenure.

One of Alonso's lifelong passions had been to improve the schools and champion the teachers. In pursuit of that mission, he served as president of the Hillsborough Education Association (1951–1956) and then as President of the Florida Education Association in 1957. He was especially proud of his role as one of the educators who contributed toward desegregating the FEA.

Braulio was elected president of the National Education Association and took office in July 1967. In 1968 masses of Florida teachers resigned in protest over budget cuts. Braulio ended his teaching career by resigning as principal of King High School in solidarity with the teachers. The county refused to rehire him after the protest. Braulio later became the NEA's director of international relations and traveled the world representing the NEA. He retired his post at the NEA in 1983.

In 2001, Braulio Alonso High School was opened in honor of Dr. Alonso.
