= On Your Feet or on Your Knees =

Live album by Blue Öyster Cult
- Released: February 27, 1975
- Recorded: April 27, 1974; October 5–21, 1974
- Venues: Academy of Music, New York City; Paramount Theatre, Portland, Oregon; Paramount Theatre, Seattle, Washington; Show Palace, Phoenix, Arizona; Long Beach Arena, Long Beach, California; P.N.E. Coliseum, Vancouver, British Columbia; Capitol Theatre, New Jersey
- Genres: Hard rock; heavy metal
- Length: 78:13
- Label: Columbia
- Producers: Murray Krugman; Sandy Pearlman

Blue Öyster Cult chronology
Secret Treaties (1974)	On Your Feet or on Your Knees (1975)	Agents of Fortune (1976)

Blue Öyster Cult live chronology
On Your Feet or on Your Knees (1975)	Some Enchanted Evening (1978)

Professional ratings
Review scores
Source	Rating
AllMusic	2/5 stars
Christgau's Record Guide	C+
Collector's Guide to Heavy Metal	8/10
Rolling Stone	(mixed)
Tom Hull	C−

On Your Feet or on Your Knees is the first live album by American rock band Blue Öyster Cult, released on Feb. 27, 1975 by Columbia Records. The album features three songs from each of the band's first three studio albums, two covers ("I Ain't Got You", albeit with modified lyrics, and "Born to Be Wild"), and one ("Buck's Boogie") original instrumental that remains a staple of the band's live shows to this day. The 12 songs include performances at the Academy of Music in New York City, the Paramount Theatre in Portland, the Paramount Theatre in Seattle, the Show Palace in Phoenix, the Long Beach Arena, the P.N.E. Coliseum in Vancouver and the Capitol Theatre in New Jersey, although it's not clear which songs came from which venues and on what dates.

The cover lettering designed by Gerard Huerta, also used on the 2012 boxed set, was one of the first "Heavy Metal" logo designs. The cover art, photographed by John Berg, prominently features St Paul's Episcopal Chapel in South Salem, New York.

The album reached No. 22 on the Billboard 200, the band's highest-charting album in the United States.

== Track listing ==
Side one
No.	Title	Writer(s)	Length
1.	"Subhuman"	Eric Bloom, Sandy Pearlman	7:30
2.	"Harvester of Eyes"	Donald Roeser, Bloom, Richard Meltzer	4:55
3.	"Hot Rails to Hell"	Joe Bouchard	5:55

Side two
No.	Title	Writer(s)	Length
4.	"The Red and the Black"	Albert Bouchard, Bloom, Pearlman	4:33
5.	"7 Screaming Diz-Busters"	A. Bouchard, J. Bouchard, Pearlman, Roeser	8:27
6.	"Buck's Boogie"	Roeser	7:40

Side three
No.	Title	Writer(s)	Length
1.	"Then Came the Last Days of May"	Roeser	4:35
2.	"Cities on Flame"	Roeser, A. Bouchard, Pearlman	4:08
3.	"ME 262"	Bloom, Roeser, Pearlman	8:47

Side four
No.	Title	Writer(s)	Length
4.	"Before the Kiss, a Redcap"	Allen Lanier, Murray Krugman, Roeser, Pearlman	5:05
5.	"Maserati GT (I Ain't Got You)"	Calvin Carter	8:59
6.	"Born to Be Wild"	Mars Bonfire	6:36
Total length:			78:13

== Personnel ==
Band members

- Eric Bloom - lead vocals on tracks 1–2, 4–5, 9, 11–12, stun guitar, synthesizer
- Donald "Buck Dharma" Roeser - lead guitar, lead vocals on "Then Came The Last Days of May" and "Before the Kiss, a Redcap"
- Allen Lanier - rhythm guitar, keyboards
- Joe Bouchard - bass, lead vocals on "Hot Rails to Hell"
- Albert Bouchard - drums, guitar, lead vocals on "Cities on Flame"

Production

- Murray Krugman, Sandy Pearlman - producers
- Tom Scott, Kurt Kuntzel, Aaron Baron, Tim Geelan, Pete Weiss, Jerry Smith - engineers
- Jack Douglas - engineer, mixing
- John Berg and Gerard Huerta - design
- John Berg - cover photograph at St. Paul's Chapel, Vista, New York

== Charts ==
Chart (1975)	Peak position
Canada Top Albums/CDs (RPM)	22
French Albums (SNEP)	19
US Billboard 200	22

== Certifications ==
Region	Certification	Certified units/sales
United States (RIAA)	Gold	500,000^{^}
^{^} Shipments figures based on certification alone.
