= Sourvein =

American sludge metal band

- Origin: Cape Fear, North Carolina, U.S.
- Genres: Sludge metal, doom metal
- Years active: 1993–present
- Labels: Candlelight, Southern Lord, Metal Blade

Sourvein is an American sludge metal band that formed in Cape Fear, North Carolina during 1993. The band has released four albums, three EPs, and various 7" splits.

== Discography ==
- Split with Buzzoven (Mudflap, 1995)
- He's No Good to Me Dead split with Negative Reaction, Grief, Subsanity, and Bongzilla (Game Two, 1998)
- s/t aka Salvation (Game Two, 1999)
- Will to Mangle (Southern Lord, 2002)
- Split with Rabies Caste (Dada Drumming, 2004)
- Emerald Vulture EP (This Dark Reign, 2005)
- Split with Church of Misery (Dada Drumming, 2006)
- Split with Church of Misery (Calculon, 2006)
- Ghetto Angel EP (This Dark Reign, 2007)
- Imperial Bastard EP (Candlelight, 2008)
- Heavyweight Black split with Blood Island Raiders (Calculon, 2009)
- Black Fangs (Candlelight Records, 2011)
- Split with Coffins (2012)
- Aquatic Occult (Metal Blade Records, 2016)

== Band members ==
=== Current ===
- T.G.Roy - Vocals / Bass
- Joshua I - Guitar
- Spencer - Drums

=== Former ===
- Liz Buckingham - Guitar (Electric Wizard)
- S.Floyd Guitar
- Charlie Mack - Bass
- Jerry p. Clyde - Drums

=== Touring and recording ===
- Lou Gorra (Solarized) - Touring/recording Bass
- Scott Renner (Goatsnake) - Touring Bassist
- Reed Mullin (Corrosion of Conformity) - recording drums
- Todd Dystopia (Dystopia)-touring bassist
- Dave Scrod - (Cave In)-touring bassist
- Boone Doom -(Swashbuckler) touring bassist
