= Aileen Wuornos: The Selling of a Serial Killer =

1992 documentary film by Nick Broomfield

- US film poster
- Directed by: Nick Broomfield
- Written by: Nick Broomfield
- Starring: Aileen Wuornos; Nick Broomfield
- Cinematography: Barry Ackroyd
- Release date: November 1992
- Running time: 87 minutes
- Language: English

Aileen Wuornos: The Selling of a Serial Killer is a 1992 documentary film about Aileen Wuornos, made by Nick Broomfield. It documents Broomfield's attempts to interview Wuornos, which involves a long process of mediation through her adoptive mother, Arlene Pralle, and her lawyer, Steve Glazer.

The film essentially highlights the exploitation of Wuornos by those around her and questions the fairness of her trial, given the vested interests of the police. The film was used by the defense in the Wuornos trial in 2001 to highlight the incompetence of Wuornos' original lawyer. It was through this process that Broomfield decided to make a second film, Aileen: Life and Death of a Serial Killer.

For the feature film Monster, Charlize Theron used this film as source material, apparently watching clips in-between takes in order to perfect her character. For her performance, Theron won a Best Actress Oscar, awarded on what would have been Wuornos's birthday.

== Cast ==
- Aileen Wuornos as herself
- Nick Broomfield as himself – Interviewer
- Jesse Aviles as himself (Jesse "The Human Bomb" Aviles)
- Cannonball as himself
- Steve Glazer as himself
- Sgt. Brian Jarvis as himself
- Michael McCarthy as himself
- Dick Mills as himself
- Arlene Pralle as herself
- Mike Reynolds as himself
- Teddy Davy as himself

== Reception ==
On the review aggregator website Rotten Tomatoes, 100% of 9 critics' reviews are positive, with an average rating of 7.9/10.

== Awards ==
- 1993 – Nominated for the Grand Jury Prize for Documentary at the Sundance Film Festival
