= Sherman Johnson =

American baseball player (born 1990)

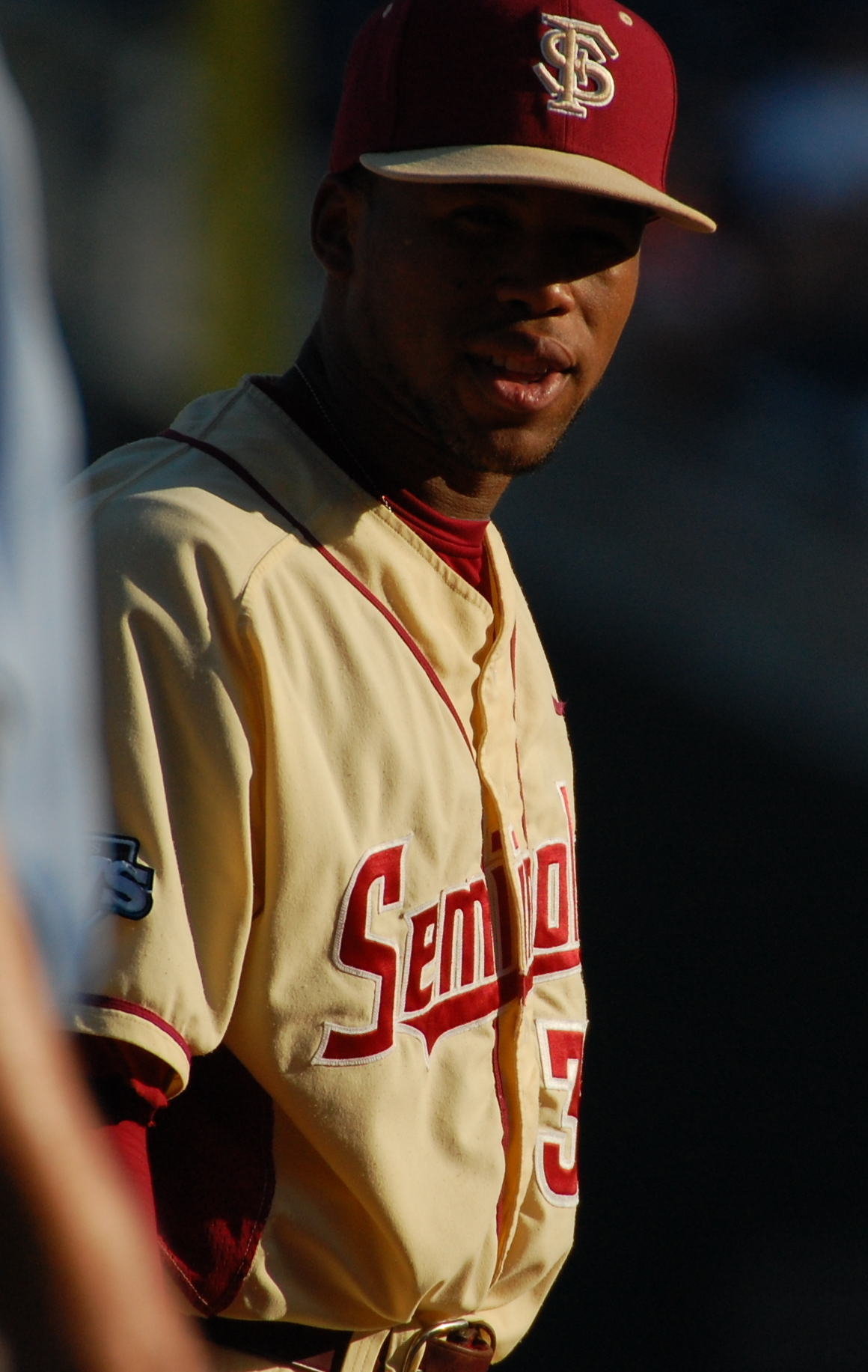
- Johnson with Florida State in 2012
- Infielder / Coach
- Born: July 15, 1990 (age 36); Tampa, Florida, U.S.
- Batted: Left Threw: Right

MLB debut
- September 19, 2018, for the Los Angeles Angels

Last MLB appearance
- September 30, 2018, for the Los Angeles Angels

MLB statistics
- Batting average: .000
- Home runs: 0
- Runs batted in: 0
- Stats at Baseball Reference

Teams
- As player: Los Angeles Angels (2018); As coach: Baltimore Orioles (2025)

Sherman Lee Johnson (born July 15, 1990) is an American former professional baseball infielder and coach. He played in Major League Baseball (MLB) for the Los Angeles Angels in 2018.

== Amateur career ==
Johnson graduated from Braulio Alonso High School in Tampa, Florida. He enrolled at Florida State University (FSU) where he played college baseball for the Florida State Seminoles. In 2012, as a junior at FSU, he batted .263 with five home runs and 38 RBIs in 67 games (all starts).

== Professional career ==
=== Los Angeles Angels ===
The Los Angeles Angels of Anaheim selected Johnson in the 14th round of the 2012 MLB draft. After signing with the Angels, Johnson was assigned to the Orem Owlz and spent the whole season there, batting .269 with three home runs and twenty RBIs in 54 games. In 2013, he played with the Burlington Bees and the Inland Empire 66ers, posting a combined .264 batting average with four home runs, 34 RBIs, and 23 doubles in 111 games, and in 2014, he played for Inland Empire where he compiled a .276 batting average with 17 home runs, 78 RBIs, and an .847 OPS in 136 games. Sherman spent 2015 with the Arkansas Travelers where he batted .204 with seven home runs and 53 RBIs in 135 games, 2016 with both Arkansas and the Salt Lake Bees where he collected a combined .246 batting average with 12 home runs, 54 RBIs, and 21 doubles in 127 games, and 2017 with Salt Lake and the Mobile BayBears where he posted a combined .258 batting average with five home runs and 57 RBIs in 120 games.

Johnson began the 2018 season with Salt Lake. The Angels promoted him to the major leagues on September 18, and he made his major league debut the next day. He was outrighted to the minors on November 1, 2018. He elected free agency on November 2.

=== Later playing career ===
On February 11, 2019, Johnson signed a minor league deal with the Cincinnati Reds. Appearing in 71 games for the Triple-A Louisville Bats, he hit .241/.353/.355 with 4 home runs, 15 RBI, and 4 stolen bases. On July 31, Johnson was released by the Reds organization.

On February 29, 2020, Johnson signed a minor league deal with the Pittsburgh Pirates. He did not play in a game in 2020 due to the cancellation of the minor league season because of the COVID-19 pandemic. Johnson was released by the Pirates organization on June 9.

On March 24, 2021, Johnson signed with the Kane County Cougars of the American Association of Professional Baseball. However, he left the Cougars on May 12, without having played a game for them. On May 12, Johnson signed a minor league contract with the Minnesota Twins organization. Johnson appeared in 75 games split between the Double-A Wichita Wind Surge and the Triple-A St. Paul Saints, posting a cumulative .202/.353/.332 with 5 home runs, 33 RBI, and 3 stolen bases. He elected free agency following the season on November 7.

On April 5, 2022, Johnson signed with Kane County Johnson appeared in 90 games for the Cougars, slashing .231/.385/.416 with 13 home runs and 52 RBI. He was released on November 3.

== Coaching career ==
=== Baltimore Orioles ===
On February 2, 2023, Johnson was announced as the hitting coach for the Bowie Baysox, the Double-A affiliate of the Baltimore Orioles. On February 7, 2024, the Orioles announced that Johnson would shift to the role of upper–level hitting coordinator.

On November 14, 2024, Johnson was promoted to the role of assistant hitting coach with the major league staff.

=== Chicago White Sox ===
On October 28, 2025, it was announced that Johnson would be leaving the Orioles to join the Chicago White Sox as a minor league hitting coordinator.
