= Cities on Flame with Rock and Roll =

Single by Blue Öyster Cult

from the album Blue Öyster Cult
- B-side: "Before the Kiss, a Redcap"
- Released: April 21, 1972
- Recorded: October 1971
- Studio: The Warehouse, New York City
- Genre: Heavy metal; hard rock; blues rock
- Length: 3:14 (single edit); 4:03 (album version)
- Label: Columbia
- Songwriters: Sandy Pearlman; Donald Roeser; Albert Bouchard
- Producers: Murray Krugman; Sandy Pearlman

Blue Öyster Cult singles chronology
"Cities on Flame with Rock and Roll" (1972)	"Hot Rails to Hell" (1973)

Professional ratings
Review scores
Source	Rating
Rolling Stone	(favorable)

"Cities on Flame with Rock and Roll" is the debut single by American hard rock band Blue Öyster Cult from their eponymous debut album Blue Öyster Cult. Despite not charting, it has become a staple in the band's live show. Its demo is credited with getting the band signed with Columbia Records. Lead vocals were performed by drummer Albert Bouchard. The lyrics describe the devastation of nuclear war with metaphors likening the destruction to rock and roll music.

== Reception ==
Cash Box called it a "hard driving, heavy metal rocker will be immediately attractive to both AM and FMers looking to put some life into their playlists." AllMusic wrote: "Bursting out with an instantly memorable power riff even Black Sabbath would kill for, "Cities on Flame With Rock and Roll" is the most metallic, straightforward, and punchy song from Blue Öyster Cult's 1972 debut."

== Personnel ==
- Eric Bloom – stun guitar
- Albert Bouchard – vocals, drums
- Joe Bouchard – bass
- Allen Lanier – keyboards
- Buck Dharma – lead guitar

== Cover versions ==
The song has been covered by Church of Misery (on Master of Brutality), Iced Earth (on Tribute to the Gods) and 3 Inches of Blood (as a bonus track on Here Waits Thy Doom).
