= Master of Brutality =

Studio album by Church of Misery
- Released: 2001
- Genre: Doom metal, stoner metal
- Length: 41:23
- Label: Southern Lord

Church of Misery chronology
| Born Too Late (1998) | Master of Brutality (2001) | The Second Coming (2004) |

Professional ratings
Review scores
| Source | Rating |
|---|---|
| AllMusic | 4.5/5 stars |

Master of Brutality is the debut studio album by the Japanese doom metal band Church of Misery, released in 2001 by Southern Lord Records.

Five of the six tracks were based on and titled after infamous serial killers Edmund Kemper, Peter Sutcliffe, Herbert Mullin and John Wayne Gacy (portrayed on the cover). The instrumental track "Green River" was inspired by serial killer Gary Ridgway. The first track, "Killifornia", contains samples of Kemper speaking. The artwork and booklet features pictures and sketches of Gacy; the back art depicts Gacy dressed as "Pogo the Clown".

The album also contains a cover of "Cities on Flame with Rock and Roll" by Blue Öyster Cult.

== Track listing ==
All lyrics are written by Tatsu Mikami (except where noted).

| No. | Title | Lyrics | Music | Length |
|---|---|---|---|---|
| 1. | "Killifornia (Ed Kemper)" | | Mikami | 8:23 |
| 2. | "Ripping Into Pieces (Peter Sutcliffe)" | | Mikami | 7:46 |
| 3. | "Megalomania (Herbert Mullin)" | | Mikami | 5:26 |
| 4. | "Green River" | (Instrumental) | Tomohiro Nishimura | 4:30 |
| 5. | "Cities on Flame With Rock and Roll" | Blue Öyster Cult | Blue Öyster Cult | 4:00 |
| 6. | "Master of Brutality (John Wayne Gacy)" | | Mikami | 11:16 |
| Total length: | | | | 41:23 |

== Personnel ==
Church of Misery

- Yoshiaki Negishi – vocals
- Tomohiro Nishmura – guitar
- Tatsu Mikami – bass
- Junji Narita – drums
