= Amscot Financial =

Financial service provider

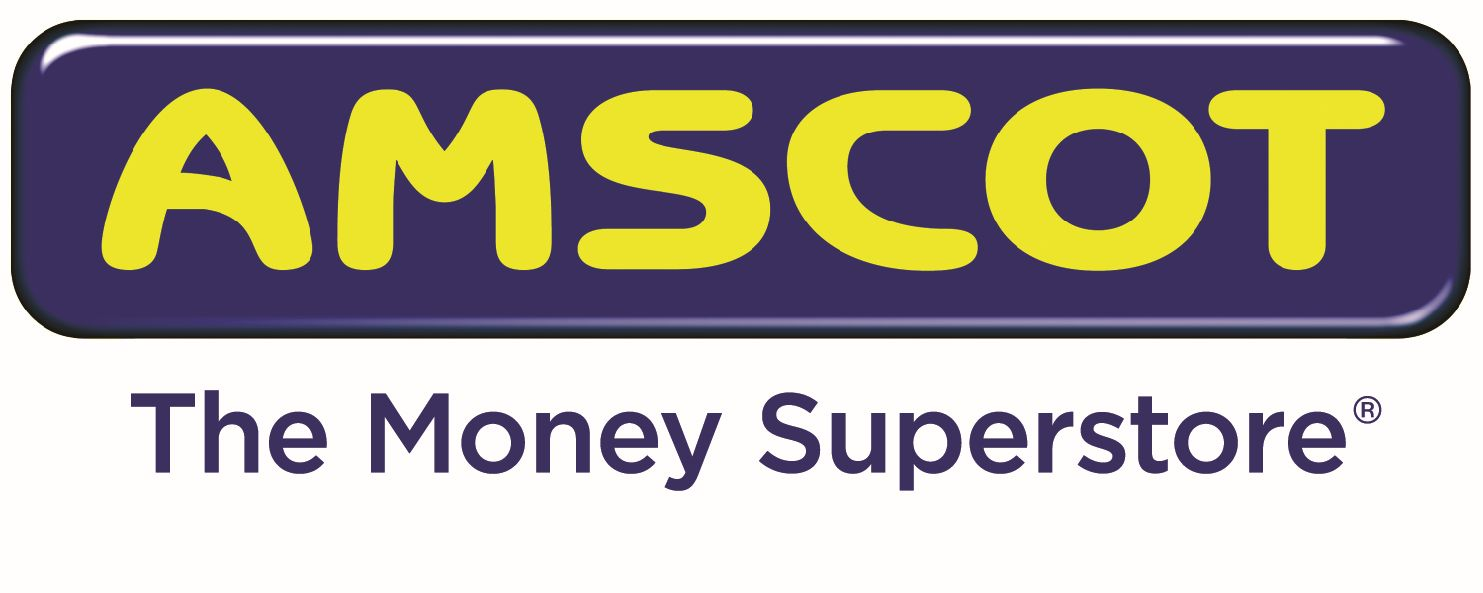
- Type: Private
- Industry: Financial services
- Founded: June 1989
- Founder: Ian Mackechnie
- Headquarters: Tampa, FL
- Number of locations: 240 branches
- Area served: Florida
- Number of employees: 2,000+
- Website: amscot.com

Amscot Financial is an American financial services company headquartered in Tampa, Florida. Founded in 1989 by Ian MacKechnie, Amscot Financial provides non-bank consumer financial services through a network of retail branches located exclusively within Florida. Amscot's core services include check cashing, bill payment, prepaid access cards, payday loans, free money orders, ATMs in every branch, wire transfers, notary services, fax services, and postage. Amscot Financial operates nearly 240 branch locations in the Tampa Bay, Orlando and Miami media markets.

The company does not franchise any of its branches and employs approximately 2,000 people.

In 2008, Amscot was named the Top Employer in Tampa in the Tampa Bay Business Journal's Biggest Employers list.

In 2014, Amscot landed on the No. 36 spot on the Tampa Bay Business Journal 's Tampa Bay Business 100 list. Amscot is a member of several trade organizations, including the national INFiN, a Financial Services Alliance, formerly known as Financial Services of America (FISCA) and also the statewide Florida Consumer Financial Services of America (FCFSA). Amscot has also partnered with or supported a number of community organizations in Florida, including the Children Rescue Network, the Kids First traffic safety program, and the Consortium of Florida Education Foundations (CFEF).

== History ==
Amscot Financial was founded in 1989 in Tampa, Florida, by Ian MacKechnie, an entrepreneur and businessman who moved with his family from Scotland to the United States in 1986. Coming from a background of building and expanding businesses, MacKechnie bought a bakery in Tampa and began supplying doughnuts and pastry goods throughout west central Florida. While continuing to run his bakery business, MacKechnie noticed that his employees were cashing their paychecks in convenience stores to avoid the hassle of going to a bank. Recognizing a demand for a check cashing business, MacKechnie sold the bakery company and founded his own check-cashing company. He created and trademarked the company name Amscot as an homage to both his new home in the United States and his native Scotland. In June 1989, the first Amscot location was opened on East Broadway in Tampa and a second followed shortly thereafter on Fletcher Avenue.

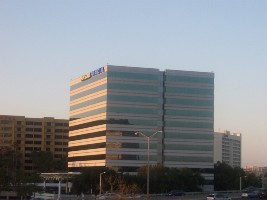
Amscot Financial Tower in Westshore, a principal business district of Tampa, Florida.

In the early 2000s, the company continued to grow and diversify its products and services mix. By March 2005, Amscot Financial operated 84 branches and serviced around 200,000 customers a week. At that time the company was handling approximately $3 billion worth of transactions a year.

By 2006, Amscot's revenues equaled $85 million. Amscot was accepting bill payments for various utilities and service providers in Florida, including TECO, Orlando Utilities Commission, and Lakeland Electric, with Duke Energy and Florida Power and Light (FP&L) added later. In addition, Gulf Coast Business Review (now known as Business Observer) named founder Ian MacKechnie their "Entrepreneur of the Year" in 2006.

By late 2012, following an expansion into the Miami market, Amscot increased its storefronts in Florida averaging 1,600 to 2,400 square feet per branch.

In 2013, Amscot had branches in 20 Florida counties and operated 3 training centers that train over 50 new employees each week.

On December 25, 2015, the Tampa Bay Business Journal reported that Ian Mackechnie was one of the "top 5 searched people in 2015" on their newspaper website. According to the publication, their list narrowed down a "pattern of curiosity that crosses personal finance, real estate, philanthropy and retail."

As of 2018, the company has annual revenues in excess of $220 million.

The company now serves over 3 million customers each year, and MacKechnie continues to serve as chairman and CEO, while his son Ian Andrew MacKechnie serves as executive vice chairman, corporate secretary, and treasurer, and his son Fraser MacKechnie serves as chief operating officer and president.

== Associations ==
Amscot is a member of several trade organizations, including the national INFiN, a Financial Services Alliance, formerly known as Financial Services of America (FISCA) and also the statewide Florida Consumer Financial Services of America (FCFSA).

== Community involvement ==
Amscot is involved with various community programs and partners with service organizations throughout the state of Florida, including the Children Rescue Network, supporting their Safety ID Card program in Florida which provides free safety ID cards of children to parents in case a child goes missing. Since 2004, Amscot has partnered with law enforcement in Tampa Bay to promote traffic safety awareness. Amscot's "Kids First" program works with police to provide free bicycle helmets and fittings at Amscot locations, and in 2013, Amscot distributed over 12,000 free bike helmets. The company is a long-term supporter of the Consortium of Florida Education Foundations (CFEF). In 2006, Amscot started its annual "Just a Dollar" campaign, which raises funds for local education foundations.
