= Jon Sims Center for the Performing Arts =

Coordinates: 37°46′26″N 122°25′2″W

The Jon Sims Center for the Performing Arts (JSCPA) was a multidisciplinary performing arts center in San Francisco, California, that supported artistic voices of all performing artists no matter their sexual identity or preferences. The Center provided resources to support and promote new and existing arts programs. JSCPA was the "official" home to many groups, including the San Francisco Gay Freedom Day Marching Band (seated concert band), the San Francisco Tap Troupe, City Swing with Gail Wilson, the Barbary Coast Cloggers and the original home of the Pacific Ballet headed by Kaz Zmuda.

At its height, the resources JSPCA provided artists included three rehearsal/performance spaces and networking resources for local performing artists, as well as funding for at least one artist-in-residence annually.

The Pacific Ballet Center became the permanent home of the San Francisco Tap Troupe in 1983. Two years later Pacific Ballet offered to let the SF Tap Troupe take over management of building. The group approached the board of the SF Band Foundation and the board agreed to take control of 1519 Mission Street and signed a new lease.

The Jon Sims Center opened in 1985, a year after the death of Jon Reed Sims, the founder of the San Francisco Gay Freedom Day Marching Band and Twirling Corps (now the San Francisco Lesbian/Gay Freedom Band). Sims, who died of AIDS in 1984, also founded the San Francisco Gay Men's Chorus, the San Francisco Lesbian Gay chorus and Lambda Pro Musica (a classical seated group). Sims later founded the San Francisco Tap Troupe with his close friend Rosie Radiator.

The Center closed in November 2006 following a financial crisis that included the disappearance of $35,000 in grant money. Longer-term problems included the lack of a stable, long-term board and executive director, despite determined efforts to keep the institution alive.

The Sims Center was located at 1519 Mission Street, San Francisco, CA 94103.
