= Guitar Hero Mobile series =

Rhythm video game series

Guitar Hero Mobile
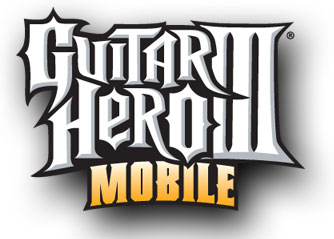
- Logo for the first mobile game, Guitar Hero III Mobile
- Genre: Rhythm
- Developers: MachineWorks Northwest LLC, Glu Mobile
- Publisher: Hands-On Mobile
- Platforms: J2ME, BREW, N-Gage 2.0, Blackberry OS, Android, Windows Mobile, Windows Phone
- Parent series: Guitar Hero

Guitar Hero Mobile is a series of rhythm video games in the Guitar Hero series, adapting the normal console-based gameplay which uses a guitar-shaped controller to match notes of popular rock music songs to work with the face buttons on advanced mobile phones, including BlackBerry devices and those supporting the Windows Mobile platform. The first three games in the series—Guitar Hero III Mobile, Guitar Hero Backstage Pass, and Guitar Hero World Tour Mobile were developed by MachineWorks Northwest LLC and published by Hands-On Mobile, while a mobile version of Guitar Hero 5 and Guitar Hero: Warriors of Rock was developed by Glu Mobile. The series has proven to be popular; the Guitar Hero III Mobile game has been downloaded more than 2 million times, and over 250,000 songs are played each day across the series.

== Development ==
Originally, the Guitar Hero Mobile series was published by Hands-On Mobile and developed by MachineWorks Northwest LLC. For the first game, Guitar Hero III Mobile, Hands-On Mobile received licensing from Activision to port 51 songs, two characters, three venues, and four guitars to the mobile version. The game was originally released on Verizon Wireless, but made available on other cellphone carriers in February 2008. The game was programmed by Robinson Technologies (shortened to RTSoft) in affiliation with MachineWorks Northwest LLC. The game graphics were developed in collaboration with RTSoft and MachineWorks Northwest LLC by Anthem Game Group. The audio was taken from the original audio files used by Activision for Guitar Hero III: Legends of Rock. The audio files were reduced in file size, but remained multichannel; for example, separate channels were used for the guitar track, background instruments and vocals, audience, etc. Each song was reduced in length to two minutes to maintain shorter, "bite-sized" gameplay. To reduce the file size used by the phone, only two songs are stored at any time. Accessing other songs requires them to be downloaded via a cellphone network. A five button setup—like in console versions—was considered, but testing showed the game to be more entertaining with only three buttons. Rapid transitions and simultaneous button presses were included to add difficulty to the gameplay and compensate for the missing buttons.

In June 2009, it was announced that Glu Mobile would be developing versions of several Activision titles, including Guitar Hero 5, Modern Warfare 2, and Tony Hawk: Ride for release in the last quarter of 2009. The mobile version of Guitar Hero 5 was developed for Android, BlackBerry, BREW, Java ME and Windows Mobile platforms. In a change from previous games in the series, players are given the option to download MP3 versions of songs via Internet data services instead of using the MIDI versions that come with the game.

== Gameplay ==
Screenshot of the three column Fretboard. Above Judy Nails plays a double neck guitar.

Gameplay in Guitar Hero Mobile games was similar to its console counterparts, except instead of 5 frets, 3 frets are used, corresponding to each column of numbered keys on a cellphone's keypad. The numbered keys used are "1", "4", and "7" for green notes, "2", "5", and "8" for red notes, and "3", "6", and "9" for yellow notes. Once the note(s) reach the bottom, the player must play the note(s) by pressing or holding down the number key(s) in order to score points (similar to using the controller on the console versions instead of a guitar). Star Power is activated using the "*" (star) button on the keypad or the "OK" button in the center of the directional pad. Other features include online leader boards, file saves, and accomplishments achieved by meeting certain in-game criteria. The game features only single player Career mode, working through fifteen songs sorted into three tiers similar to other Guitar Hero games, and Quickplay mode, allowing the player to play any unlocked song at any time. There are no multiplayer modes in the game.

Guitar Hero Backstage Pass adds in role-playing video game elements to the core rhythm game; players not only play gigs as with Guitar Hero III Mobile but also must manage their band from near-poverty to stardom by creating marketing buzz about their band to virtual fans, manage their band, and plan out their performances at venues. Successfully completing these tasks helps the player to earn more money from their performances and to unlock new guitars and equipment that can be used by the band to further improve their performance.

In alignment with the expansion of the console series to include drums and vocal parts in Guitar Hero World Tour, Guitar Hero World Tour Mobile adds in the option to play the drum track for all of the included songs in addition to lead guitar. While drums are played similarly to guitar, the game also includes the bass drum kick, marked as a horizontal line across the on-screen fretboard, requiring the player to hit a button on the phone's keypad below the row they are using for normal drum hits. The game, when played on advanced phones that recognize simultaneous keypresses, support the playing of chords on guitar or simultaneous drum hits. Guitar Hero World Tour Mobile also supports a two-player competitive mode in a manner similar to the "boss battles" introduced in Guitar Hero III: Legends of Rock; a player may be able to collect power-ups that can be triggered in the same manner as Star Power to affect their opponent's ability to play for a brief period of time. No major gameplay additions were made for Guitar Hero 5.

== Soundtrack ==
=== Guitar Hero III Mobile ===
Guitar Hero III Mobile features 15 playable songs from Guitar Hero II and Guitar Hero III: Legends of Rock with additional expansion packs released every month. Song quality and format varies by phone type. However, only the first two minutes of each song are available to play.

==== Main setlist ====
As with Guitar Hero III for consoles, the mobile version presents songs separated into three tiers, each with four songs that must be completed before the fifth encore song can be performed. Successfully completing the encore allows the player to unlock the next tier of songs and play them in Quickplay mode.

Year	Song title	Artist	Tier
1970	"Black Magic Woman"	Santana	1. Opening Licks
1993	"Cherub Rock"	The Smashing Pumpkins	2. Amp Warmers
1979	"Hit Me with Your Best Shot"	Pat Benatar	2. Amp Warmers
1973	"Jessica"	The Allman Brothers Band	3. String Snappers
2006	"Miss Murder"	AFI	1. Opening Licks
2006	"Monsters"	Matchbook Romance	3. String Snappers
1970	"Paranoid"	Black Sabbath	3. String Snappers
1984	"Rock You Like a Hurricane"	Scorpions	3. String Snappers; Encore
1972	"School's Out"	Alice Cooper	1. Opening Licks; Encore
1974	"Strutter"	Kiss	2. Amp Warmers
1991	"Suck My Kiss"	Red Hot Chili Peppers	1. Opening Licks
1996	"Trippin' on a Hole in a Paper Heart"	Stone Temple Pilots	2. Amp Warmers; Encore
2005	"Woman"	Wolfmother	1. Opening Licks
1978	"You Really Got Me"	Van Halen	2. Amp Warmers

==== Monthly download packs ====
Each month since January 2008, a three-song pack has been released as additional content for the game. Songs downloaded this way can be played in Career mode and/or Quickplay mode.

Year	Song title	Artist	Month released
1988	"Mother"	Danzig	January 2008
1977	"Barracuda"	Heart	January 2008
1971	"The Seeker"	The Who	January 2008
2006	"Life Wasted"	Pearl Jam	February 2008
1989	"She Bangs the Drums"	The Stone Roses	February 2008
1983	"Pride and Joy"	Stevie Ray Vaughan	February 2008
1970	"War Pigs"	Black Sabbath	March 2008
1973	"Search and Destroy"	Iggy Pop and the Stooges	March 2008
1974	"Free Bird"	Lynyrd Skynyrd	March 2008
1976	"Crazy on You"	Heart	April 2008
2004	"Laid to Rest"	Lamb of God	April 2008
2007	"Metal Heavy Lady"	Lions	April 2008
1975	"Slow Ride"	Foghat	May 2008
1992	"Black Sunshine"	White Zombie	May 2008
1970	"Mississippi Queen"	Mountain	May 2008
2005	"Stricken"	Disturbed	June 2008
1987	"Talk Dirty to Me"	Poison	June 2008
1975	"Rock and Roll All Nite"	Kiss	June 2008
1985	"Madhouse"	Anthrax	July 2008
1990	"Psychobilly Freakout"	The Reverend Horton Heat	July 2008
1973	"Rock and Roll, Hoochie Koo"	Rick Derringer	July 2008
1990	"Stop!"	Jane's Addiction	August 2008
2007	"The Arsonist"	Thrice	August 2008
1990	"John The Fisherman"	Primus	August 2008
1962	"Misirlou"	Dick Dale	September 2008
1976	"Carry on Wayward Son"	Kansas	September 2008
1991	"Girlfriend"	Matthew Sweet	September 2008
1981	"YYZ"	Rush	October 2008
2006	"Freya"	The Sword	October 2008
1984	"Tonight I'm Gonna Rock You Tonight"	Spinal Tap	October 2008
1973	"La Grange"	ZZ Top	November 2008
1972	"Cities on Flame with Rock and Roll"	Blue Öyster Cult	November 2008
1977	"Last Child"	Aerosmith	November 2008
2006	"Closer"	Lacuna Coil	December 2008
2005	"F.C.P.R.E.M.I.X."	The Fall of Troy	December 2008
1990	"Cliffs of Dover"	Eric Johnson	December 2008

=== Guitar Hero World Tour Mobile ===
Guitar Hero World Tour Mobile includes 15 songs with the core game; one or more new songs were released each month.

==== Main setlist ====
Year	Song title	Artist	Tier
1993	"Are You Gonna Go My Way"	Lenny Kravitz	1. Rho Omega Kappa Fraternity House
1978	"Hollywood Nights"	Bob Seger & the Silver Bullet Band	3. Festival Arena
2007	"Lazy Eye"	Silversun Pickups	1. Rho Omega Kappa Fraternity House; Encore
2002	"Obstacle 1"	Interpol	3. Festival Arena
1978	"One Way or Another"	Blondie	1. Rho Omega Kappa Fraternity House
2008	"Overkill"	Motörhead	3. Festival Arena; Encore
2008	"Re-Education Through Labor"	Rise Against	3. Festival Arena
1996	"Santeria"	Sublime	2. Castlestein Concert
1995	"Some Might Say"	Oasis	2. Castlestein Concert; Encore
1996	"Spiderwebs"	No Doubt	2. Castlestein Concert
2003	"Stillborn"	Black Label Society	1. Rho Omega Kappa Fraternity House
1975	"Stranglehold"	Ted Nugent	3. Festival Arena
1974	"Sweet Home Alabama" (live)	Lynyrd Skynyrd	2. Castlestein Concert
1993	"Today"	Smashing Pumpkins	2. Castlestein Concert
1970	"Up Around the Bend"	Creedence Clearwater Revival	1. Rho Omega Kappa Fraternity House

==== Monthly Download Packs ====
Song title	Artist	Month released
"The Joker"	Steve Miller	Dec. 2008
"G.L.O.W."	Smashing Pumpkins	Dec. 2008
"You're Gonna Say Yeah"	HushPuppies	Jan. 2009
"Our Truth"	Lacuna Coil	Feb. 2009
"Gimme All Your Lovin'"	ZZ Top	Feb. 2009
"Demolition Man" (Live)	Sting	Mar. 2009
"Band on the Run"	Wings	Apr. 2009
"Nuvole E Lenzuola"	Negramaro	May 2009
"Toy Boy"	Stuck in the Sound	June 2009
"Jimi"	Slightly Stoopid	June 2009

=== Guitar Hero 5 Mobile ===
Guitar Hero 5 Mobile includes 20 songs, stored as MIDI files in the game, though players can download MP3-quality versions via their mobile's data network prior to playing. The songs are a subset of those from the Guitar Hero 5 setlist.

Year	Song title	Artist
2008	"A-Punk"	Vampire Weekend
2008	"Blue Day"	Darker My Love
2009	"Bring the Noise 20XX"	Public Enemy featuring Zakk Wylde
1994	"Comedown"	Bush
2007	"Demon(s)"	Darkest Hour
1995	"Disconnected"	Face to Face
2000	"Ex-Girlfriend"	No Doubt
1975	"Fame"	David Bowie
2000	"Kryptonite"	3 Doors Down
1992	"Lithium" (live)	Nirvana
2003	"One Big Holiday"	My Morning Jacket
1995	"Only Happy When It Rains"	Garbage
2001	"The Rock Show"	Blink-182
2008	"Sneak Out"	Rose Hill Drive
1980	"The Spirit of Radio" (live)	Rush
2006	"Streamline Woman"	Gov't Mule
1996	"What I Got"	Sublime
2008	"You and Me"	Attack! Attack!
1998	"Younk Funk"	The Derek Trucks Band

== Reception ==
Guitar Hero III Mobile was well received upon its release. IGN considered it to be a "successful adaptation" of the Guitar Hero games to the cellphone keypad. They commented that while it may be tricky to download the songs for the game, requiring the user to be persistent during the download, the sound quality was excellent and the simplification down to three buttons from five makes the game "accessible to anybody with even a passing curiosity." CNET praised the quality of the sound and animations, as well as the ease of play. Cell Play referred to the game as "the true mobile port of rock," and praised the level of difficulty accomplished with the three button setup. They considered the shortened song length a negligible downside compared to the overall package. 1UP's review criticized the compact layout that led to hand cramps, and that the limited space on the mobile version only allowed two songs to be stored at a time. 1UP also lamented the shorted versions of the songs given the outstanding audio quality achieved on the mobile platform; their review summarized their experience as "As a literal interpretation of the Guitar Hero formula, there was apparently no room to alter the game to emphasize the strengths of the mobile platform." Guitar Hero III Mobile won two awards at the Qualcomm 2008 BREW Developers Conference for "Best Game" and "People's Choice Award". The game has been downloaded by users 2.5 million times, with both Verizon and Hands-On Mobile claiming that over 250,000 songs are played a day on the platform.

Guitar Hero Backstage Pass was also praised for the addition of role-playing elements and smaller minigames to bring the series in line with other mobile phone games. The mini-games were said to help build up the anticipation of the performance element of the game, making these feel as necessary elements of the player's band's career progression. The game won the 2009 Webby Award for Best Mobile Gaming application.

Guitar Hero World Tour Mobile has also received similar praise to its predecessors. Both CNET and IGN commented on the improvement in sound quality for both low- and high-end phones, with songs being "instantly recognizable" on low-phones, but noted that this quality came with the tradeoff of a larger memory footprint and slow downloads of songs through the cellular networks. However, Pocket Gamer UK noted that on the Java ME version, the songs are only slightly improved over that of a MIDI file. The addition of drums, which is said to effectively double amount of gameplay, and multiplayer to the mobile game was also well received.

Guitar Hero 5 was seen by Pocket Gamer UK to be yet another iteration of the series on mobile platforms, though the game still stands on its own given the numerous other music-based games for mobile phones. They praised the ability to use higher-quality versions of the songs though still allowing those with limited data plans to enjoy the game with the MIDI versions.
