= Tyranny and Mutation =

Studio album by Blue Öyster Cult
- Released: February 1973
- Recorded: 1972
- Studios: Columbia, New York City
- Genres: Hard rock; heavy metal
- Length: 38:11
- Label: Columbia
- Producers: Murray Krugman, Sandy Pearlman

Blue Öyster Cult chronology
Blue Öyster Cult (1972)	Tyranny and Mutation (1973)	Secret Treaties (1974)

Singles from Tyranny and Mutation
- 1. "Hot Rails to Hell" Released: July 13, 1973

Tyranny and Mutation (stylized on the cover as THE BLVE ÖYSTER CVLT: TYRANNY AND MVTATION), the second studio album by American rock band Blue Öyster Cult, was released in February 1973 by Columbia Records. It was produced by Murray Krugman and Sandy Pearlman. On May 12, 1973, the album peaked at No. 122 on the Billboard 200 chart. This is the only album in BOC's catalog to include the definite article The in the band's name.

The only single released from the album, "Hot Rails to Hell", did not chart.

== Composition and songs ==
The album was recorded in late 1972 at Columbia Studios in New York City.

"Baby Ice Dog" features lyrics by singer/poet Patti Smith, who would make several more lyrical contributions to the band's repertoire over its career.

The song "The Red and the Black", with lyrics referencing the Royal Canadian Mounted Police, is a re-titled, re-recorded version of "I'm on the Lamb But I Ain't No Sheep" from the band's eponymous debut album. The song was later covered by the Minutemen and Band of Susans. AllMusic critic Hal Horowitz called it "one of the best and most propulsive rockers in the BÖC catalog".

== Critical reception ==
Professional ratings
Review scores
Source	Rating
AllMusic	4.5/5 stars
Christgau's Record Guide	B+
Collector's Guide to Heavy Metal	8/10
The Encyclopedia of Popular Music	3/5 stars
The Rolling Stone Album Guide	4.5/5 stars

"Tyranny and Mutation" received mixed reviews from contemporary critics. Gordon Fletcher of Rolling Stone wrote a rave review of the album and called Blue Öyster Cult "one of the best bands America's got". Robert Christgau, writing for The Village Voice, praised the band's disregard for "the entire heavy ethos" but wondered if the "parody-surreal refraction of the abysmal 'poetry' of heavy" in the lyrics could be a start for a return to conformism. The Rolling Stone Album Guide described the album as "one molten hook after another" and praised the four-song "opening suite" comprising the first side of the album. However, Mike Saunders of Phonograph Record judged "Tyranny and Mutation" "a real disappointment", definitely inferior to their debut album and lacking "the sort of brashness that almost defines hard rock or metal music". Ian MacDonald of the British New Musical Express was very critical of the Pearlman/Meltzer "crass Satan-speed-and-sadism" lyrics and of the band's music which "tend to leave the listener aurally shaken, but emotionally unstirred."

Modern reviews are generally positive. Thom Jurek of AllMusic noted how BÖC "brightened their sound and deepened their mystique" on this album and described the music as "screaming, methamphetamine-fueled rock & roll that was all about attitude, mystery, and a sense of nihilistic humor that was deep in the cuff", judging Tyranny and Mutation just as much a "classic album" as its follow-up Secret Treaties. Martin Popoff in his Collector's Guide to Heavy Metal acknowledged the progress achieved in production values compared with their debut but found the sound "still mired in an oddly appealing maze of cobwebs", despite Blue Öyster Cult parading a slew of classic songs and "quickly becoming something very imposing".

== Release history ==
In addition to the conventional 2-channel stereo version, the album was also released in a 4-channel quadraphonic version on LP record and 8-track tape in 1974. The quad LP release was encoded in the SQ matrix system.

== Track listing ==
All lead vocals by Eric Bloom, except where noted.

Side one – The Black
No.	Title	Writer(s)	Lead vocals	Length
1.	"The Red & the Black"	Bloom, Albert Bouchard, Sandy Pearlman		4:20
2.	"O.D.'d on Life Itself"	Bloom, A. Bouchard, Joe Bouchard, Pearlman		4:47
3.	"Hot Rails to Hell"	J. Bouchard	J. Bouchard	5:12
4.	"7 Screaming Diz-Busters"	A. Bouchard, J. Bouchard, Donald Roeser, Pearlman		7:01

Side two – The Red
No.	Title	Writer(s)	Lead vocals	Length
1.	"Baby Ice Dog"	Bloom, A. Bouchard, Patti Smith		3:29
2.	"Wings Wetted Down"	A. Bouchard, J. Bouchard	J. Bouchard, Bloom	4:12
3.	"Teen Archer"	Bloom, Roeser, Richard Meltzer	Roeser	3:57
4.	"Mistress of the Salmon Salt (Quicklime Girl)"	A. Bouchard, Pearlman		5:08

2001 CD reissue bonus tracks
No.	Title	Writer(s)	Length
9.	"Cities on Flame with Rock and Roll" (live; originally from the promo-only Blue Öyster Cult Bootleg EP)	A. Bouchard, Pearlman, Roeser	4:44
10.	"Buck's Boogie" (studio version)	Roeser, A. Bouchard, Pearlman	5:22
11.	"7 Screaming Diz-Busters" (live; from the band's personal archives)	A. Bouchard, J. Bouchard, Roeser, Pearlman	14:01
12.	"O.D.'d on Life Itself" (live; from the band's personal archives)	Bloom, A. Bouchard, J. Bouchard, Pearlman	4:52
Total length:			66:30

== Personnel ==
Band members

- Eric Bloom – vocals, stun guitar, synthesizers
- Donald "Buck Dharma" Roeser – lead guitar, vocals
- Allen Lanier – keyboards, rhythm guitar
- Joe Bouchard – bass guitar, keyboards, vocals
- Albert Bouchard – drums, vocals

Production

- Murray Krugman, Sandy Pearlman – producers
- Tim Geelan, Lou Schlossberg, Phil Giambalvo – engineers
- Bill Gawlik – artwork
- Jack Ashkinazy – mastering
- Bruce Dickinson – reissue producer
- Vic Anesini – re-mastering

== Charts ==
Chart (1973)	Peak position
US Billboard 200	122
