= Williams Rule =

Rule in US criminal cases

The Williams Rule is based on the holding in the Florida state case of Williams v. Florida which relevant evidence of guilt is admissible at jury trial when it does not solely aim to prove the "bad character" or "criminal propensity" of the defendant, but is used to show motive, intent, knowledge, modus operandi, or lack of mistake.

Following cases in the state have molded and defined the applicability of the Williams Rule in criminal cases. Varying standards of "relevance" seem to apply depending on the prong of the rule applied.

The legislature of Florida has also codified the Williams Rule in Florida Statute section 90.404(2)(a). The federal analogue to Florida's Williams Rule is codified under rules 404(a)(2) and 404(b)(2) of the Federal Rules of Evidence.

In Akers v. State, the Florida Fourth District Court of Appeal clarified that evidence of another crime cannot be introduced unless some relevancy to the trial at hand is shown by evidence. In Akers, the court stated that "if prosecutors insist on crying the wolf of the Williams Rule they might eventually find the courts hard of hearing." Critics of the way the Williams Rule is often used by the prosecution say that trial courts fail to require the requisite showing of relevance to the current issues before allowing the Williams Rule evidence to be introduced. As such, these critics claim that the evidence is in fact being used to show the bad character and criminal propensity of the defendant. Such a use is prohibited by the rules of evidence.
