= Church of Misery =

Japanese doom metal band

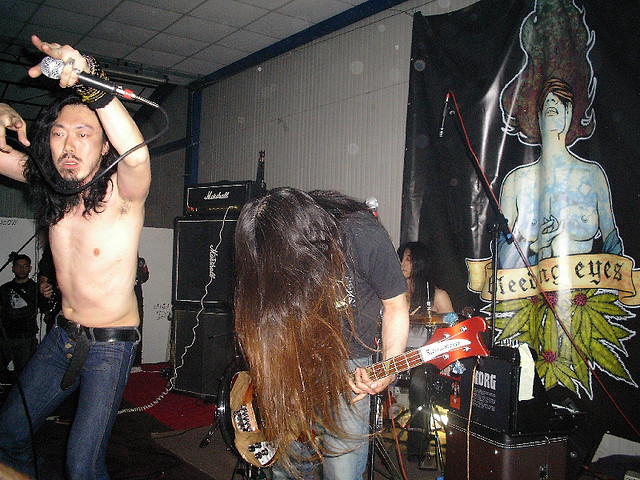
- Church of Misery in 2003

Background information
- Origin: Tokyo, Japan
- Genres: Doom metal, stoner metal
- Years active: 1995–present
- Labels: Doom, Bad Acid, Game Two, Man's Ruin, Southern Lord, Kult of Nihilow, Diwphalanx, Dada Drumming, Calculon, A Pile of Dirt, Rise Above, Metal Blade
- Members: Tatsu Mikami; Kazuhiro Asaeda; Fumiya Hattori; Toshiaki Umemura
- Past members: Hiroyuki Takano; Yasunori Takada; Yasuto Muraki; Junichi Yamamura; Hideki Fukasawa; Junji Narita; Ikuma Kawabe; Yoshiaki Negishi; Tom Sutton; Nobukazu Chow; Tomohiro Nishimura; Hideki Shimizu; Takenori Hoshi; Kensuke Suto; Scott Carlson
- Website: churchofmisery.net

Church of Misery (チャーチ・オブ・ミザリー, Chāchi obu Mizarī) is a Japanese doom metal band from Tokyo, formed in 1995. Church of Misery's musical style melds early Black Sabbath–style doom with psychedelic rock; most of the band's songs are about serial killers and mass murderers.

The band has gone through many lineup changes, with bassist Tatsu Mikami being the sole constant member throughout the years.

== History ==
=== Beginnings and lineup changes (1995–2008) ===
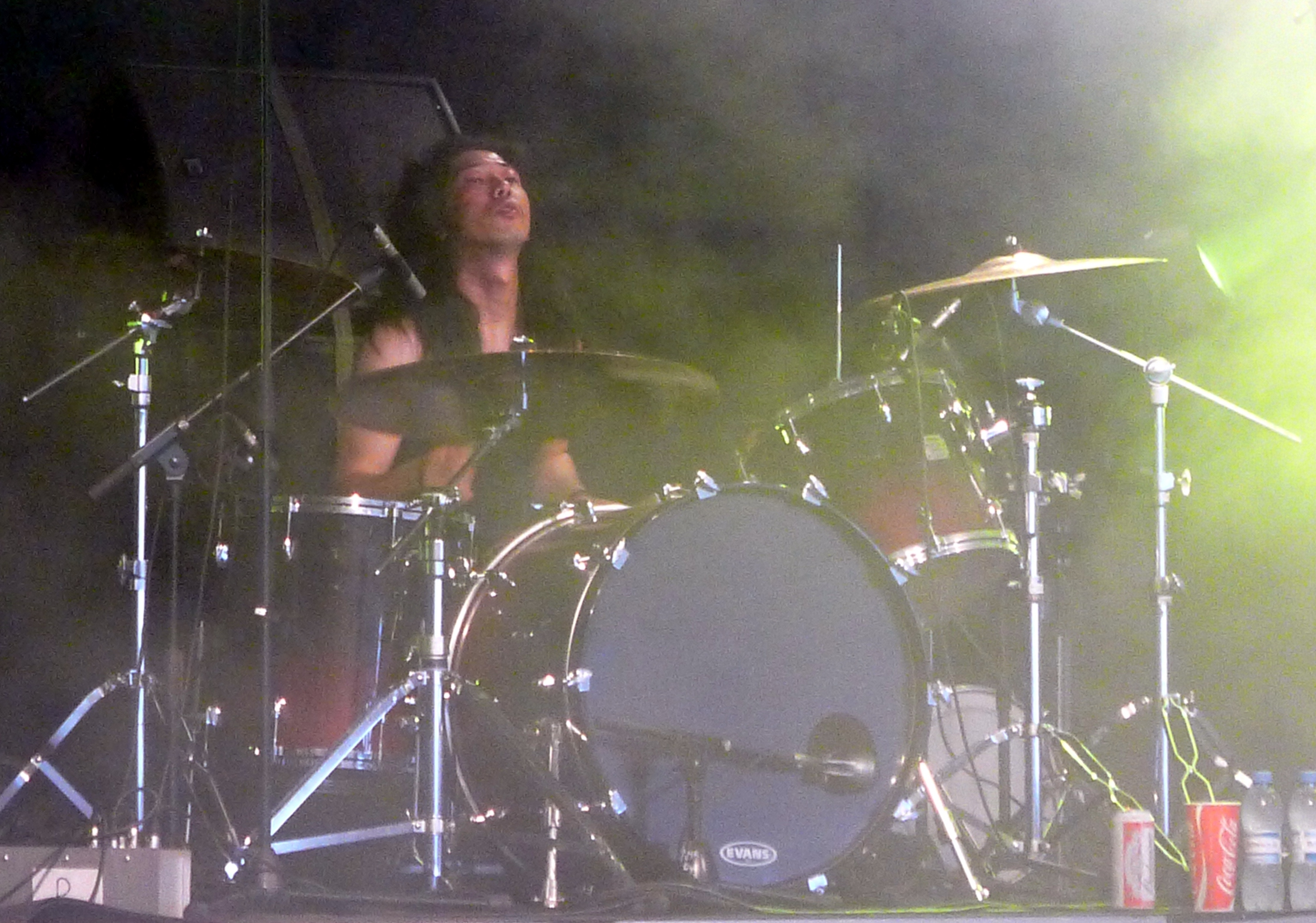
Church of Misery at Tuska Open Air 2011

Church of Misery formed in 1995 with a lineup of Mikami, vocalist Kazuhiro Asaeda, guitarist Tomohiro Nishimura and drummer Hideki Shimizu. This lineup recorded the Vol. 1 album, released in 1997 by Doom Records without the band's consent (it was later officially reissued in 2007 by Japan's Leaf Hound Records). In 1996, vocalist Nobukazu Chow replaced Asaeda. The band's first EP, Taste the Pain, was released in 1998 by Bad Acid Records, followed by the Murder Company EP in 1999 on Man's Ruin Records. Singer Yoshiaki Negishi and drummer Junji Narita replaced Chow and Shimizu, respectively, in 2000.

In 2001, Southern Lord Records issued the band's official debut full-length album, Master of Brutality. After its release, founding guitarist Nishimura was replaced briefly by Osamu Hamada and then by Takenori Hoshi.

New singer Hideki Fukasawa joined in time for the band's second full-length album, The Second Coming, released in 2004 by Japanese label Diwphalanx Records. That same year, Leaf Hound released Early Works Compilation, collecting the first band's two EPs, cover versions and other material from 1998–2000. Guitarist Tom Sutton replaced Hoshi in 2006.

They released numerous split albums and EPs between 1998 and 2006, including two with Sourvein, with whom they toured Europe in 2006.

Church of Misery performed at the Roadburn Festival in 2008, 2009, 2010 and 2012.

=== Departures, lineup changes and recent activities (2009–present) ===
The band's third album, Houses of the Unholy, was issued in 2009 by Rise Above Records and Metal Blade Records. Following its release, prior vocalist Negishi rejoined, lasting until 2011, while Sutton was replaced first by Kensuke Suto and then by Ikuma Kawabe. Fukasawa rejoined on vocals for their fourth album, Thy Kingdom Scum (2013).

In 2014, Church of Misery toured Europe three times, the first being a support slot for Monster Magnet. Following the band's extensive summer tour, Fukasawa, Kawabe and Narita collectively quit, leaving Mikami as the only remaining member of the group.

On January 1, 2015, Mikami announced on the band's official Facebook page that he was planning a new Church of Misery album. Mikami recorded their sixth album, And Then There Were None..., that May in Maryland in the U.S. with session musicians Scott Carlson (ex-Cathedral, Repulsion), Eric Little (Earthride) and Dave Szulkin (Blood Farmers). The album was released in March 2016 by Rise Above. This line-up did not tour.

Mikami searched for new members, and vocalist Hiroyuki Takano (from Japanese sludge band Sithter) and guitarist Yasuto Muraki joined in 2015. On April 24, 2017, it was announced via the band's website and Facebook page that drummer Junichi Yamamura had been added as an official member, with the message "Church of Misery rises again!" A fall tour of Europe along with festival shows were confirmed shortly after, the first to feature the new line-up and the first shows for Church of Misery since the last live line-up ended in 2014.

After extensive touring, in mid-2020 once again the band announced member changes. Muraki departed ways with the band followed by Yamamura, citing health reasons and creative differences for the latter in June. As quickly as August 2020 the band announced its new drummer and guitarist on its official Facebook page. Drumming duties were announced to be taken over by Yasunori Takada (ex-Mono) also with a new, young guitarist, Fumiya Hattori, on board. However, as soon as winter 2021 it was announced again on the official Facebook page that both members already left the band, the reasons being cited as "personal reasons."

As a reoccurring trend with Church of Misery, line-up changes continued yet again with vocalist of about 7 years, Hiroyuki Takano, who also left the band for "personal reasons" in November 2022. This time he was replaced with the original Church of Misery vocalist, Kazuhiro Asaeda, who also joined Mikami's other band, Sonic Flower, as vocalist years prior. Along with members of Nagoya, Japan doom legends Eternal Elysium as recording session members, Church of Misery would finally record their latest full length studio album. On March 2, 2023, the band released a statement on their official Facebook page, "We took 7 months to make a new album and we sent the final master tape and artwork to the label finally!". The band would follow with two tours of Europe to support the next album, titled Born Under a Mad Sign. The band's first show with this lineup would be at the Electric Ballroom in London on May 5, 2023, as part of DesertFest London. It would be Kazuhiro Asaeda's first live performance with Church of Misery since 1996.

== Members ==
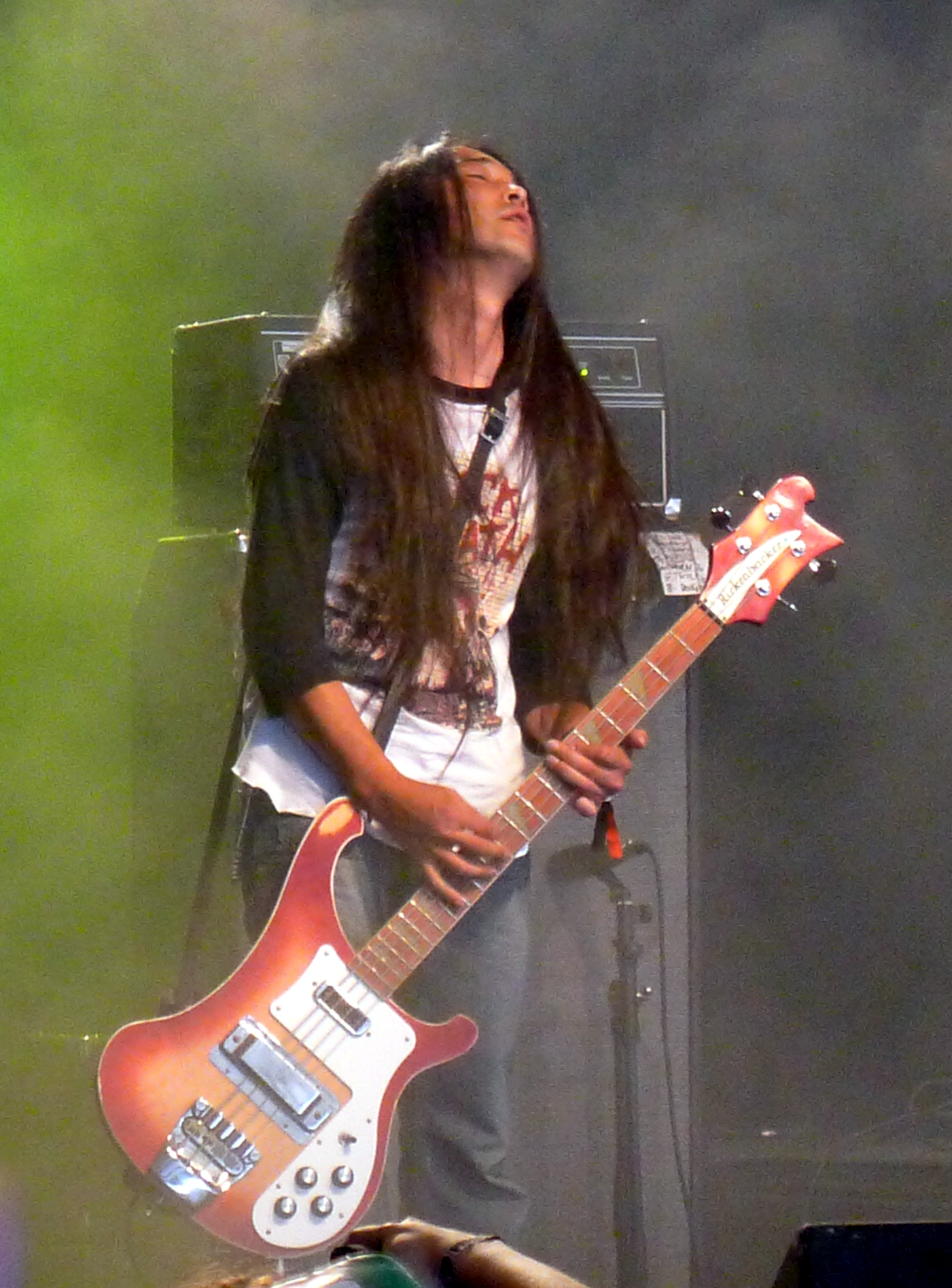
Bassist Tatsu Mikami has been the sole constant member.

=== Current ===
- Tatsu Mikami – bass (1995–present)
- Kazuhiro Asaeda – vocals (1995–1996, 2022–present)
- Fumiya Hattori – guitars (2020–2021, 2022–present)
- Toshiaki Umemura – drums (2022–present)

=== Former ===
- Tomohiro Nishimura – guitars (1995–2001)
- Hideki Shimizu – drums (1995–2000)
- Nobukazu Chow – vocals (1996–2000)
- Junji Narita – drums (2000–2014)
- Yoshiaki Negishi – vocals (2000–2004, 2009–2011)
- Osamu Hamada – guitars (2001)
- Takenori Hoshi – guitars (2002–2006)
- Hideki Fukasawa – vocals, synthesizers (2004–2009, 2012–2014)
- Tom Sutton – guitars (2006–2010)
- Kensuke Suto – guitars (2010–2011)
- Ikuma Kawabe – guitars (2012–2014)
- Yasuto Muraki – guitars (2015–2020)
- Junichi Yamamura – drums (2017–2020)
- Yasunori Takada – drums (2020–2021)
- Hiroyuki Takano – vocals (2015–2022)

=== Session ===
- Scott Carlson – vocals (2015)
- Eric Little – drums (2015)
- David Szulkin – guitars (2015)
- Toshiaki Umemura – drums (2022–2023)
- Yukito Okazaki – guitars (2022–2023)

== Discography ==
=== Studio albums ===
- Master of Brutality (2001, Southern Lord Records)
- The Second Coming (2004, Diwphalanx Records)
- Vol. 1 (2007, Lead Hound Records)
- Houses of the Unholy (2009, Rise Above Records/Metal Blade Records)
- Thy Kingdom Scum (2013, Rise Above Records/Metal Blade Records)
- And Then There Were None… (2016, Rise Above Records)
- Born Under a Mad Sign (2023, Rise Above Records)

=== EP's, splits and singles ===
- Taste the Pain CD EP (1998, Bad Acid Records)
- We've Learned Nothing/Church of Misery split with Iron Monkey CD EP (1998, Man's Ruin Records)
- Born Too Late split with Sheavy (1998, Game Two Records)
- Murder Company 10" EP (1999, Man's Ruin Records)
- Boston Strangler 12"/CD EP (2002, Kult of Nihilow Records)
- Acrimony/Church of Misery split with Acrimony (2003, Game Two Records)
- Church of Misery/Sourvein split with Sourvein 7" single (2006, Dada Drumming Records)
- Sourvein/Church of Misery split with Sourvein 7" single (2006, Calculon Records)
- Church of Misery/Deer Creek split with Deer Creek 12" EP (2006, Calculon Records)
- Dennis Nilsen 12" EP (2008, Kult Of Nihilow)
- Greetings From Jonestown 12" EP (2009, A Pile of Dirt Music)
- "Confessions of an Embittered Soul" flexi 7" (2015, Decibel Flexi Series)

=== Live albums ===
- Live Beyond the East split with Millarca EP (1998, self-released)
- Live At Roadburn 2009 (2010, Roadburn Records)

=== Compilation albums ===
- Early Works Compilation (2004, Leaf Hound Records)

=== Compilation appearances ===
- "Where Evil Dwells (Richard Ramirez)" and "Spahn Ranch (Charles Manson)" on Doomsday Recitation (1997, Cornucopia Records)
- "Sick of Living (Zodiac)" on Stone Deaf Forever (1999, Red Sun Records)
- "Come Touch the Sky" Trouble cover on Bastards Will Pay: Tribute to Trouble (1999, Freedoom Records)
- "Accident" Black Widow cover on King of the Witches: Tribute (2000, Black Widow Records)
- "Chains of Death" Death SS cover Beyond the Realms of Death SS (2000, Black Widow Records)
- "Brother Bishop (Gary Heidnik)" on Sludge Metal Massacre Vol. 3 (2013, Holy Grail from Hell)

=== Home videos ===
- Wizard's Convention: Japanese Heavy Rock Showcase DVD (Diwphalanx Records, 2005)
- Houses of the Unholy DVD (2006, Diwphalanx Records)
- +++ Live in Red – Eurotour 2005 +++ DVD (2007, Salvation)
- Live at Roadburn 2009 DVD (2010, Roadburn Records)
- Terror in Tokyo DVD (2013, Emetic Records)
