= The Automatt =

Recording studio in San Francisco

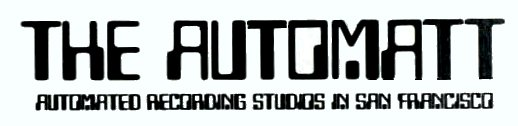
- Type: Recording studio
- Founded: 1976
- Founder: David Rubinson
- Defunct: 1984
- Headquarters: San Francisco, California, U.S.

The Automatt was a sound recording studio in San Francisco, California, promoted for its early mix automation system. During its eight active years, 1976 to 1984, it was one of the top recording studios in the region. The Automatt was founded by producer David Rubinson and opened in an existing studio subleased from Columbia Records, who continued to record in the same building for a few years; thus it was sometimes referred to as CBS/Automatt. Rubinson leased the whole building in 1978 and from that point, operated three rooms for recording and mixing, a mastering room, a rehearsal room, and offices. The studio complex was known for its top-notch equipment, for the hit records it produced, and for the famous artists who recorded there. Under Rubinson and chief engineer Fred Catero it served as the training ground for respected recording engineers such as Leslie Ann Jones and producers such as Scott Mathews.

== Background ==
=== Coast Recorders ===
The first recording studio built at 827 Folsom Street in San Francisco was a built-new location for Coast Recorders, one of many recording studios Bill Putnam operated in U.S. cities. Putnam leased the Folsom location from its aging owner, John Vitlin, a Russian immigrant who co-founded Global Merchandising, an import/export company in San Francisco. To replace an obsolescent building housing Coast Recorders on Bush Street, Putnam designed a two-floor studio complex containing all the necessary record company elements under one roof: three recording and mixing rooms, a mastering room with a disc cutting lathe, a high-speed tape duplication room, and office space for label and studio management. Unusually, five echo sends were available for use throughout the facility, two of them stereo echo chambers normaled (connected by default) to the main two studios. Francis Ford Coppola leased space on the second floor for his American Zoetrope film studio. The first session was taped on June 23, 1969, in Studio B, and the grand opening was held later that November. Less than a year later, on September 15, 1970, Putnam sold majority control of the building to Columbia Records, a division of CBS.

=== Columbia Studios San Francisco ===
Columbia Records under Clive Davis wished to cater to San Francisco artists who were less willing to travel to Los Angeles or New York to make records. Davis hoped that the new location would be more open to musician creativity and less constricted by union rules. Columbia assumed operation of Coast's Studios A and B, bringing in Roy Halee—known for experimental recording techniques that conflicted with union rules—from New York as chief engineer. Roy Segal, also from Columbia New York, was enlisted to engineer and to manage the facility, and A&R-man and producer George Daly developed performing artists. Engineer Glen Kolotkin joined from Los Angeles, and San Francisco-based George Horn also joined as mastering engineer, working out of Studio D with its Westrex disc cutting lathe, under lease from Coast. Coast Recorders continued in business, working out of Studio C, fitted for quadraphonic projects.

Columbia found it difficult to attract San Francisco artists who were instead booking time at Wally Heider Studios because of its casual vibe and its string of hits. Fred Catero, a successful engineer and New York native, doubted the wisdom of by-the-book Columbia operating in the laid-back atmosphere present in the Bay Area. Years later, he said, "Columbia was a very conservative company ... It was all-union and everything was done by the clock. There were very strict rules about how long sessions could go and, of course, about drugs and things like that." The first album recorded at Columbia in San Francisco was the fourth album for New York-based Blood, Sweat & Tears, produced and engineered by Halee. Subsequently, New Yorker Paul Simon flew out to record his first U.S. solo album which sold over a million copies. Segal was more successful bringing in Bay Area artists; he recorded Big Brother & the Holding Company, Sons of Champlin, and Sly & the Family Stone.

Tasked with both studio maintenance and record mastering, George Horn brought in Phil Brown to help. For a few years, Columbia owned the only stereo lacquer mastering equipment in San Francisco, and it was kept busy. Paul Stubblebine joined Columbia's San Francisco recording studio in 1973 as an intern, later advancing to second engineer, then mastering engineer under Horn. Between the three of them, Horn, Brown and Stubblebine operated the mastering suite day and night.

The studio recorded and mixed works by Columbia artists and also by non-Columbia producers and artists such as the Grateful Dead, who recorded Grateful Dead from the Mars Hotel; a 1974 release that was named after a rundown residential hotel a block and a half away on 4th Street.

=== David Rubinson ===
David Rubinson worked as a producer for Columbia Records until settling in the San Francisco Bay Area in 1969. He encouraged his favorite Columbia engineer Fred Catero to leave his job—and a newly completed home in New York—to bring his family to the West Coast and to partner with him on recording projects. The two intended to open a recording studio with rock promoter Bill Graham and entertainment attorney Brian Rohan, but the resulting umbrella organization The Fillmore Corporation with its two record companies, Fillmore Records and San Francisco Records, instead booked artists at Pacific Recorders in San Mateo, California; the only 16-track studio in the area at the time. Rubinson and Catero made several hit recordings there over the next five years, at first for The Fillmore Corporation and then after it folded in 1971, for Rubinson's own promotion company: David Rubinson & Friends. In 1973 after repeated bad experiences with the studio owner, Rubinson severed relations with Pacific Recorders. Instead, he paid a discount price in advance for 3,000 hours of studio time at Wally Heider's Studio A, to be used at night and on weekends. Rubinson asked Heider to install a four-channel musicians' headphones monitoring system, and an automation system for the mixing console, but Heider refused.

Frustrated first with Pacific and then with Heider, and enticed by Columbia's new 16-track studio, Rubinson began bringing his artists to Columbia Studios in the early 1970s. He moved his operations to offices on the second floor, above the recording studios; his own large office was formerly used by Coppola. Frustrated with traveling between recording sessions in Los Angeles and San Francisco, Rubinson sought to record at a single San Francisco studio that he could use as he saw fit. He made an offer to CBS to take over Columbia's Studio C, paying an annual lease on the space to Vitlin's son and heir, attorney Victor Vitlin. CBS would supply the infrastructure, the microphones, and studio maintenance and reception services. Rubinson also leased a rehearsal room on the second floor which once housed Coppola's film studio. To differentiate his business, Rubinson decided to install a new mixing console as well as multitrack recording equipment. Catero would be the chief engineer for the new room. In late 1976, Rubinson and CBS signed the deal and Rubinson began bringing clients to the studio, which he named "the Automatt," as a play on New York's old-style coin-operated food vending restaurants called "automats", and because the studio's new mixing console was equipped with an advanced new feature: the first practical recording studio automation system in San Francisco. The mixer that Rubinson had bought was a Harrison 4032 mixing console with programmable mute keys, and he had a Michael Larner-assembled Allison Research Memory-Plus Automation System based on the Zilog Z80 microprocessor. The Allison system was capable of handling 40 microphone inputs mixing down to 32 tracks on tape, and it could store 65,536 separate functions. Larner also assembled for Rubinson an interface called Autopunch which automated the controls of the MCI 24-track tape machine. As well, the Automatt offered a 4-track monitor system for the musicians, a revolutionary development which gave each performer greater freedom to optimize his or her own headphones mix. The studio monitors were Big Reds, popular boxes based on the Altec Lansing Duplex 604 coaxial speaker, powered by McIntosh MC75 tube monoblock amplifiers.

== History ==
=== 1976–1978 ===
The first session that Rubinson brought to the Automatt was Heartsfield, a vocal rock group that recorded their album Collector's Item in late 1976. In December, Rubinson produced remote recordings made by Santana in Europe, and when Santana returned home they came to the Automatt to record new tracks and mix the album Moonflower—a combination of concert and studio work. In March 1977 the Meters, a band who had never before recorded outside of New Orleans, laid down tracks for their album New Directions. Immediately following, Patti LaBelle booked the studio and rehearsal space. She practiced 40 songs written by herself, Rubinson, and his A&R man Jeffrey Cohen, narrowing the selections down to 9 for her first solo album, Patti LaBelle. Musicians on the project included pianist Bud Ellison who was also musical director, drummer James Gadson, guitarist Ray Parker Jr., and two members of the Meters who stayed to help: bassist George Porter Jr. and guitarist Leo Nocentelli.

Competing with the Automatt in San Francisco was the studio Different Fur, also boasting a Harrison console with Allison Research automation. In March 1977, owner Patrick Gleeson said, "David Rubinson may have the most advanced studio west of Market Street, but we have the most advanced east of Market." Gleeson, an expert programmer and player of synthesizers, took part in the scoring of the film Apocalypse Now, his synth parts blended into the whole soundtrack at the Automatt in 1979, engineered by Leslie Ann Jones in Dolby Stereo 70 mm Six Track. Using Studio D, CBS recording studio worked with Rubinson to master his mixes for release. CBS mastering engineer George Horn fine-tuned songs by Rubinson clients Phoebe Snow, Santana and Patti LaBelle.

Bassist Ron Carter recorded his album Third Plane at the Automatt in July 1977, with Tony Williams on drums and Herbie Hancock on keyboards. The Automatt was given a project by Hancock later that summer: mix the live album VSOP: The Quintet, to be assembled from two live performances, one indoors in San Diego and one outdoors in Berkeley. The group (composed of four members of the 1964-1969 Miles Davis Quintet with Freddie Hubbard on trumpet) was signed to Columbia, but the mixing process was difficult because of the two different acoustic performance spaces, and the Automatt was chosen for the task. The automated mixing equipment proved its value when Hancock visited to approve the final mix. Hancock was displeased with the level of artificial reverberation applied to the piano per his earlier instruction—he wanted to change how much EMT plate reverb was in the mix. However, a different artist was at that time booked in the studio mixing an album. Rather than zeroing out the Harrison console's settings and losing headway on the other project, Catero was able to save the current settings, then recall the earlier VSOP session settings on the Allison automation, make a minor adjustment to the level of EMT reverb, and re-mix the album in less than two hours.

At the Automatt's grand opening party in early 1978, Clive Davis and Roy Segal listened to the VSOP master tapes, and an array of well-known San Francisco Bay Area artists, engineers and producers attended. Rubinson and Davis toasted the success of the studio with glasses of wine from Rubinson's cellar, but the next day CBS announced they were closing the whole building because of financial difficulties. Segal locked the doors. The union engineers at CBS initiated a strike to recoup their pay. Even though the Automatt was not a union house, CBS was, and the Automatt's doors remained locked until the strike was resolved.

Prompted by this setback, Rubinson arranged with master lease holder Putnam to sublease the whole building, and re-opened in 1978 with three studios in operation. Rubinson distributed his collection of vintage Wurlitzer jukeboxes throughout the facility.

Bandleader Spike Jones' daughter Leslie Ann Jones came on board in 1978 as engineer under Catero. Rubinson told her that Catero was the only engineer, so he did not know whether she would be assistant engineer or first engineer. She said later, "I thought, 'Well, all it's going to take is one person calling that doesn't have their own engineer and I'll be it.' And that's exactly what happened." Jones soon picked up first engineer assignments, and later co-produced some recordings, beginning with Holly Near's Speed of Light (co-produced with Evie Sands).

The organization became known for having the finest equipment run by expert engineers led by Catero and Jones. Mastering engineer Paul Stubblebine stayed on at the studio, changing employers from CBS to Rubinson. Other gold- and platinum-level engineers who polished their craft at the Automatt include Jim Gaines, Maureen Droney, Ken Kessie, David Frazer, Michael Rosen and John Nowland. Jones said that, at one time when the studio had six engineers on staff, "three of them were women"; no other major recording studio could boast such feminist equality at the time. She said, "the funny thing is, I don't think that David [Rubinson] even really thought about that. You see, the integrity and vibe came from the top down." Three of the studio's managers were women: Susan Skaggs, Janice Lee and Michele Zarin. All three went on to manage or operate other recording studios.

For three weeks in September and October 1978, singer Joe Strummer and guitarist Mick Jones of the Clash appeared at the Automatt to record overdubs for the album Give 'Em Enough Rope. Flying in from the UK, Jones and Strummer stayed at the Holiday Inn in Chinatown, and nearly every night they listened to punk bands play at the Mabuhay Gardens, known in the punk scene as "the Mab". They saw their acquaintance Nick Lowe and met his girlfriend Carlene Carter (the step-daughter of one of their musical heroes: Johnny Cash) after seeing her sing. Between takes at the Automatt, Strummer and Jones listened for the first time to the Bobby Fuller Four version of "I Fought the Law" on one of Rubinson's jukeboxes, and when they returned to England they re-made the song into a Clash standard.

On October 1, 1978, the band Journey performed at the Automatt with guest artists, broadcast nationwide as "Journey & Friends" on the King Biscuit Flower Hour radio program. The "Friends" consisted of the Tower of Power horn section, vocalists Jo Baker and Annie Sampson from Stoneground, and guitarist/vocalist Tom Johnston of the Doobie Brothers.

=== 1979–1980s ===
Independent label 415 Records was founded in San Francisco in 1978, and from the beginning Rubinson was supportive of the organization. David Kahne, A&R director and staff producer for 415, operated out of a small upstairs office at the Automatt, signing and recording bands such as Translator and Wire Train. Punk bands were given a discount rate at the studio, often recording at night and on weekends. By 1982, Kahne was also producing and engineering Rank and File for Slash Records. In 1983, Daniel Levitin joined 415 Records, producing an album for the Afflicted. The next year he replaced Kahne, and recorded a series of little-known bands such as the Big Race for 415. Levitin befriended veteran producer Sandy Pearlman who sometimes worked at the Automatt, and years later Pearlman accepted the position of president of 415 Records. In the mid-1980s the two men drove to Stanford University to audit classes about brain function and neuropsychology, especially ones given by Karl H. Pribram. This was the start of Levitin's doctoral studies in that field, researching how the brain works when making music.

Journey returned to the Automatt in November 1979 with 19 new songs, and recorded them "live" in the studio, the musicians playing together at the same time. Producers Geoff Workman and Kevin Elson, both former recording engineers, helped the band trim the collection down to 11 for the album Departure. Released in March the next year, the album went to #8 on Billboard's album charts.

In February 1982 at age 39, Rubinson suffered a heart attack. Rather than return to work and aggravate his nerves, he stopped producing bands. He brought in Michelle Zarin to replace Michelle Meisner as studio manager. Zarin came to the Automatt from the role of general manager at the Record Plant in Sausalito. Meisner moved back to engineering, adding mastering to her list of skills. In May, Rubinson underwent quadruple bypass surgery. Regarding Zarin, Rubinson said, "She was a gift ... She took over the studio and treated it like it was her own. Everybody loved her; she was phenomenal."

In her office, Zarin held Friday afternoon wine-and-cheese parties with producers, artists and engineers who had worked at the Automatt during the week. This regular get-together became something of a local in-scene fixture, with famous artists and producers meeting each other and sharing ideas. In 1984 after he came on board with 415 Records, Levitin was invited by Zarin to attend his first Friday office party. Levitin said he was anxious to meet Ron Nevison, engineer of Quadrophenia for the Who who was working at the Automatt for Jefferson Starship, but Levitin violated an unstated protocol and introduced himself to Nevison. Levitin said Nevison shook his hand but then turned away and continued his conversation with others, and never spoke to Levitin again. Zarin later told Levitin that, had he waited for her to make the introduction, the meeting would have been more rewarding.

Pearlman returned to the Automatt in 1983 to oversee an album by Blue Öyster Cult. He stayed on and subleased Studio C from Rubinson, calling it Time Enough & World Enough Studios. There, he recorded Dream Syndicate's Medicine Show album in 1984, and kept the room busy with smaller projects, including mixes by disc jockey François Kevorkian. From 1980, Narada Michael Walden booked a great deal of time at the studio, completing the transition from being a successful drummer to producing artists, composing music and drumming. Walden's first producer credit was for Sister Sledge, and he attracted further female vocalist clients, producing Angela Bofill, Patti Austin, Phyllis Hyman, Margie Joseph, Stacy Lattisaw, Aretha Franklin and Whitney Houston. In 1983, Walden brought 20-year-old Tori Amos to the studio to record some demos, but Amos did not like the dance-pop stylings Walden applied to her voice, and she did not pursue the connection. Assistant engineer Ken Kessie noted that Walden worked very quickly in the studio with an expert group of backing musicians, and when one take was finished Kessie barely had enough time to put a label and leader on the reel of tape before Walden was calling to start the next recording.

In October 1984, Aretha Franklin worked on part of her album Who's Zoomin' Who? at the Automatt. Walden supervised the session, with David Frazer engineering. The song "Freeway of Love" was the result, later a Grammy-winning hit. Next, Walden brought Whitney Houston to the Automatt to record "How Will I Know", in the process helping to create one of three chart-topping hits from her debut album.

When property owner Vitlin informed Rubinson that he was going to increase the price of the lease by 400%, Rubinson disagreed with him. Rubinson felt that his business was barely staying alive, and that there was no pressure from the marketplace from other tenants interested in occupying the building. Rubinson pointed out that Vitlin would have to spend about a million dollars to turn the building into something else such as apartments. Vitlin insisted on the increased lease, but Rubinson refused. Instead, Rubinson paid the previously agreed amount into an escrow account.

The final blow to the business came from increased competition. Fantasy Studios had expanded their operation in Berkeley, with Segal as manager. Segal pursued former clients of the Automatt, and convinced Santana, a long-term Rubinson artist, to record at Fantasy, though they were booked for three months at the Automatt. In 1984 one week before they were to load in, Santana called the Automatt to cancel their booking, and Rubinson decided to quit. Projects in progress would have to be completed elsewhere. Pearlman took his projects to Harbor Sound in Sausalito, Walden opened his own Tarpan Studios taking over the old Tres Virgos studio in San Rafael, and other projects were completed at the Plant and Studio D (both in Sausalito), or at Fantasy.

The building remained largely vacant for five years. Right after the Automatt closed, Walden bought the Trident TSM mixing console which had been in Studio A. Levitin remembers a few odd recordings being initiated in 1985 after the Automatt supposedly shut down. In 1986, Rubinson removed the Trident TSM from Studio B and sold it to Joel Jaffe and Dan Godfrey, the owners of Studio D in Sausalito. Vitlin tried to sell the building but found no buyers. He sued the building's former tenants for making structural changes without permission: Bill Putnam, Coast Recorders, American Zoetrope, Francis Ford Coppola, the Automatt and David Rubinson. Various insurance companies paid Vitlin a settlement, and he collected Rubinson's escrow account holding the earlier, lower lease payments. Left abandoned, squatters broke into the building and occasionally lived in it. When the 1989 Loma Prieta earthquake hit, the building suffered severe structural damage. It was demolished to make a parking lot. Later, new condominiums were erected on the spot, part of a larger redevelopment project for the South of Market (SoMa) area.

== Artists in the studio ==
A month designation of "00" indicates month unknown.

Artist	Album or tune	In studio (year-month)	Producer	Engineer	Assistant engineer	References
Heartsfield	Collector's Item	1976-12	David Rubinson			
The Headhunters	Straight From The Gate	1977-00	David Rubinson, The Headhunters			
Herbie Hancock Trio	Herbie Hancock Trio	1977-00	David Rubinson	Fred Catero		
Santana	Moonflower	1977-01	David Rubinson, Carlos Santana, Tom Coster			
The Meters	New Directions	1977-03	David Rubinson, Jeffrey Cohen	Fred Catero	Chris Minto, Fred Rubinson	
Patti LaBelle	Patti LaBelle	1977-03	David Rubinson, Jeffrey Cohen	Fred Catero	Chris Minto	
Ron Carter	Third Plane	1977-07	Orrin Keepnews	Fred Catero		
various	Apocalypse Now (soundtrack)	1978-00	David Rubinson	Leslie Ann Jones, Bill Steele, Ken Kessie		
Herbie Hancock	Feets, Don't Fail Me Now	1978-00	David Rubinson, Herbie Hancock, Wah-Wah Watson	David Rubinson, Fred Catero, Bryan Bell	Leslie Ann Jones, Ken Kassie, Chris Minto, Cheryl Ward	
Joe Strummer, Mick Jones	The Clash: Give 'Em Enough Rope	1978-08	Sandy Pearlman	Chris Minto		
Elvin Bishop	Hog Heaven	1978-00				
Captain Beefheart And The Magic Band	Shiny Beast (Bat Chain Puller)	1978-00	Don Van Vliet, Pete Johnson	Glen Kolotkin	Jeffrey Norman	
Tony Williams	The Joy of Flying (tracks A3 and B1)	1978-00	Tony Williams	Fred Catero	Leslie Ann Jones	
Sharon Redd, Ula Hedwig, Charlotte Crossley	Formerly Of The Harlettes	1978-00	David Rubinson	David Rubinson, Fred Catero		
Herbie Hancock, Chick Corea	An Evening with Herbie Hancock & Chick Corea: In Concert	1978-02	David Rubinson, Herbie Hancock	Fred Catero	Leslie Ann Jones	
Chick Corea, Herbie Hancock	CoreaHancock	1978-02	David Rubinson, Herbie Hancock	Fred Catero		
Kimiko Kasai	Round And Round	1978-05	David Rubinson, Dale O. Warren	Fred Catero	Cheryl Ward, Chris Minto, Leslie Ann Jones	
Gato Barbieri	Tropico	1978-05	David Rubinson			
Peter, Paul & Mary	Reunion	1978-07	David Rubinson, Peter Yarrow	Fred Catero	Cheryl Ward, Chris Minto, Leslie Ann Jones	
Eddie Henderson	Runnin' To Your Love	1979-00	Skip Drinkwater	Jeff Titmus		
Con Funk Shun	Candy	1979-00	Con Funk Shun	Leslie Ann Jones, Fred Catero, Don Cody	Ken Kassie, Chris Minto	
Van Morrison	Into The Music	1979-00	Van Morrison	Mick Glossop	Leslie Ann Jones	
Carlos Santana	Oneness: Silver Dreams – Golden Reality	1979-00	Carlos Santana	Glen Kolotkin	Chris Minto	
Santana	Marathon	1979-00	Keith Olsen	Keith Olsen, David de Vore		
Journey	Departure	1979-11	Geoff Workman, Kevin Elson	Geoff Workman	Ken Kessie	
Pharoah Sanders	Journey To The One	1979-12	Pharoah Sanders, Allen Pittman	Bill Steele	Ken Kessie, Wayne Lewis	
Herbie Hancock	Monster	1980-00	David Rubinson, Herbie Hancock	David Rubinson, Fred Catero	Bob Kovach	
Herbie Hancock	Mr. Hands	1980-00	David Rubinson, Herbie Hancock	David Rubinson, Fred Catero, Leslie Ann Jones, Bryan Bell, Bob Kovach	Cheryl Ward, Chris Minto, Wayne Lewis	
Cris Williamson	Strange Paradise	1980-00	June Millington	Leslie Ann Jones		
The Waters	Watercolors	1980-00	David Rubinson, Luther Waters, Oren Waters	David Rubinson, Leslie Ann Jones, Bill Steele, Ken Kessie		
Jorma Kaukonen; Vital Parts	Barbeque King	1980-00	David Kahne	David Kahne	Wayne Lewis, Laertes Muldrow	
Carlos Santana	The Swing Of Delight	1980-00	David Rubinson	David Rubinson, Leslie Ann Jones	Bob Kovach	
Con Funk Shun	Spirit Of Love	1980-00	Skip Scarborough			
Pearl Harbor and the Explosions	Pearl Harbor and the Explosions	1980-00	David Kahne	Jim Gaines	Ken Kessie, Wayne Lewis	
Ronnie Montrose	Powder Heads (film soundtrack)	1980-08	Ronnie Montrose	Ken Kessie	Wayne Lewis	
Randy Hansen	Randy Hansen	1980-11	David Rubinson	Leslie Ann Jones	Wayne Lewis, Laertes Muldrow	
Sister Sledge	All American Girls	1980-11	Narada Michael Walden	Ken Kessie	Laertes Muldrow, Maureen Droney	
Tatsuya Takahashi and The Tokyo Union	Black Pearl	1980-09	Conrad Silvert, Masami Matsuoka	Fred Catero	Ken Kessie	
Con Funk Shun	Touch	1980-11		Don Cody	Wayne Lewis	
Con Funk Shun	Con Funk Shun 7	1981-00	Con Funk Shun	Leslie Ann Jones		
Holly Near	Fire In The Rain	1981-00	June Millington	Leslie Ann Jones	Susan Gottlieb	
Herbie Hancock	Magic Windows	1981-00	David Rubinson, Herbie Hancock	David Rubinson, Fred Catero, Leslie Ann Jones, Bryan Bell	Wayne Lewis	
Red Rockers	Condition Red	1981-00	David Kahne	David Kahne		
Y&T	Earthshaker	1981-00	Bob Shulman, David Sieff			
Pop-O-Pies	The White EP	1981-00	David Kahne	David Kahne		
Humans	Happy Hour	1981-00	David Kahne	David Kahne		
Stacy Lattisaw	With You	1981-00	Narada Michael Walden	Ken Kessie	Maureen Droney, Wayne Lewis	
various	Jane Fonda's Workout Record	1981-00	Jane Fonda	Leslie Ann Jones, David Frazer		
Patrick Cowley	Megatron Man	1981-00	Marty Blecman, Patrick Cowley	Ken Kessie		
Herbie Hancock	Terumasa Hino: "Merry-Go-Round"	1981-02	Kiyoshi Itoh	Leslie Ann Jones		
New Order	"Dreams Never End"	1981-09				
Kool & the Gang		1981-10		Jim Kelly, Wayne Lewis		
Bobby McFerrin	Bobby McFerrin	1982-00		Leslie Ann Jones	David Frazer, Maureen Droney	
Holly Near	Speed of Light	1982-00	Evie Sands, Leslie Ann Jones	Leslie Ann Jones		
Herbie Hancock	"Can't Hide Your Love"	1982-00	Narada Michael Walden	Ken Kessie		
Klique	Let's Wear It Out!	1982-00	David Crawford, Isaac Suthers	Leslie Ann Jones, Ken Kessie	Lisa Romano	
Billy Griffin	Be With Me	1982-00	John Barnes		Maureen Droney	
various	Conrad Silvert Presents Jazz At The Opera House	1982-00	Conrad Silvert, David Rubinson	Fred Catero, Paul Stubblebine, Leslie Ann Jones, Wayne Lewis		
Translator	Heartbeats and Triggers	1982-00	David Kahne	David Kahne		
Voice Farm	The World We Live In	1982-00	David Kahne	David Kahne		
Huey Lewis and the News	Picture This	1982-00	Huey Lewis and the News	Jim Gaines	Maureen Droney	
Patrick Cowley	Mind Warp	1982-00	Marty Blecman	Maureen Droney, Leslie Ann Jones, Ken Kessie, Robert Missbach	Gordon Lyon	
Paul Parker	Too Much To Dream	1982-00	Patrick Cowley, Marty Blecman	Maureen Droney, Ken Kessie		
Narada Michael Walden	Confidence	1982-00	Narada Michael Walden	Ken Kessie, Leslie Ann Jones	Maureen Droney	
Sylvester	All I Need	1982-00		Ken Kessie		
The Tubes	Outside Inside	1982-00	David Foster	Ken Kessie		
Jefferson Starship	Winds of Change	1982-07	Kevin Beamish	Kevin Beamish	Maureen Droney, Bruce Barris	
Moses Tyson Jr.		1982-07	Ted Currier	Leslie Ann Jones		
Carl Carlton	The Bad C.C.	1982-07	Narada Michael Walden, Gavin Christopher	David Frazer	Wayne Lewis	
Rank and File	Sundown	1982-07	David Kahne	David Kahne		
Sylvester	Call Me	1983-00	James Wirrick, Marty Blecman	Howard Johnston, John Stronach	Maureen Droney	
Santana	Shangó	1983-00		Jim Gaines	Maureen Droney	
Carlos Santana	Havana Moon	1983-00	Jerry Wexler, Barry Beckett	Ken Kessie, Jim Gaines, Chris Minto	Maureen Droney, Wayne Lewis	
Blue Öyster Cult	The Revölution By Night	1983-00	Bruce Fairbairn	Ken Kessie	Ray Pyle	
Red Rockers	Good As Gold	1983-00	David Kahne	David Kahne	Ken Kessie	
Maze featuring Frankie Beverly	We Are One	1983-00	Frankie Beverly	Leslie Ann Jones		
Loverde	"Backstreet Romance"	1983-00	James Wirrick, Ken Kessie	Ken Kessie, Ray Pyle		
Translator	Break Down Barriers	1983-00	David Kahne			
Translator	No Time Like Now	1983-00	David Kahne	Ken Kessie	Maureen Droney	
Wire Train	In a Chamber	1983-00	David Kahne	David Kahne, Jay Burnett	Maureen Droney	
Paul Kantner	Planet Earth Rock and Roll Orchestra	1983-00	Scott Mathews, Ron Nagle, Paul Kantner	David Frazer, Wayne Lewis, Steve Fontana, Ken Kessie	Maureen Droney	
The Afflicted	Good News About Mental Health	1983-00	Daniel Levitin	Paul Mandl, Maureen Droney	Maureen Droney	
Earthshaker	Fugitive	1983-11	Masa Ito	Ken Kessie		
Jane Fonda	Prime Time Workout	1984-00	Jane Fonda, Mike Mainieri	Leslie Ann Jones	Maureen Droney	
Holly Near	Watch Out!	1984-00	Holly Near, John McCutcheon	Leslie Ann Jones		
Romeo Void	Instincts	1984-00	David Kahne	David Kahne	Ken Kessie	
Blue Öyster Cult	Imaginos	1984-00	Sandy Pearlman, Daniel Levitin	Paul Mandl		
Jefferson Starship	Nuclear Furniture	1984-00	Ron Nevison	Ron Nevison	Maureen Droney	
Herbie Hancock	"Mega-Mix"	1984-00	Tony Meilandt, Herbie Hancock, David Rubinson	David Rubinson, Ken Kessie, Maureen Droney		
Patti Austin	Patti Austin (tracks A2, A4, B4)	1984-00	Narada Michael Walden	David Frazer	John Nowland	
The Whispers	"Are You Going My Way"	1984-00	Nicholas Caldwell			
Sylvester	M-1015	1984-00		Maureen Droney, Ken Kessie	Michael Rosen, Ray Pyle	
Maze	Live In New Orleans (side four)	1980-00	Frankie Beverly	Maureen Droney		
Narada Michael Walden	The Nature Of Things	1984-00	Narada Michael Walden	Dave Frazer	Maureen Droney, Michael Rosen, Ray Pyle, Wayne Lewis	
Billy Preston	On the Air (four tracks)	1984-00	Billy Preston, Galen Senogles, Ralph Benatar	Ken Kessie, Marty Blecman		
Santana	Zebop!	1984-01		Fred Catero, Keith Olsen	Maureen Droney	
Margie Joseph	Ready For The Night	1984-01	Narada Michael Walden	Ken Kessie	Michael Rosen	
The Big Race	"Hands On Ice"	1984-01	Daniel Levitin	Wayne Lewis		
Dream Syndicate	Medicine Show	1984-01	Sandy Pearlman	Paul Mandl, Dave Wittman, Rod O'Brien		
Echo & the Bunnymen	"Angels and Devils"	1984-03	Alan Perman	David Frazer		
True West	Drifters	1984-06	Paul Mandl, Daniel Levitin, Russ Tolman	Paul Mandl	Michael Rosen	
Earthshaker	T-O-K-Y-O (tracks 1 and 2)	1984-07	Masa Ito			
Aretha Franklin	Who's Zoomin' Who? (six tracks)	1984-10	Narada Michael Walden	David Frazer, Michael Brauer	Maureen Droney, Dana Chappelle, Gordon Logan, Moira Marquis, Paul Hamingson, Ray Pyle, Tim Crich	
Whitney Houston	"How Will I Know"	1984-10	Narada Michael Walden	Bill Schnee		
