= Castlemont High School =

High school in Alameda County, California, U.S.

Coordinates: 37°45′35″N 122°9′47″W

Location
- 8601 MacArthur Boulevard; Oakland, (Alameda County), California 94605; United States

Information
- Type: Public high school
- Principal: Joseph Blasher
- Staff: 43.39 (FTE)
- Enrollment: 698 (2023-24)
- Student to teacher ratio: 16.09
- Colors: Purple, white and black
- Nickname: Knights
- Website: castlemont.ousd.org

Castlemont High School is a public high school in Oakland, California, United States, originally known as East Oakland High School. It is part of the Oakland Unified School District. The Castlemont name was selected by a vote of the students.

== History ==
Castlemont High School was founded in 1929 in a medieval-style building. The architecture inspires many of the school traditions, such as the sports teams being named "Knights" and "Crusaders" and the school newspaper Ye Castle Crier. The motto is "Build on and make thy castles high and fair, rising upward to the skies."

Its Basketball teams in, 1969, 1976, & 1979 were winners of the Tournament of Champions (T.O.C.), formerly the northern California championships, and its track team in 1975 Maurice Glass held high school indoor sprint record. In 1983, Derrick Adams took first place in the 130 lbs wrestling California State Championship, the only Oakland Section person to ever place first in his weight class.

Former School Choir, "The Castleers", whose members in the 1970s toured the world performing a variety of songs that included R&B and gospel.

== Castlemont Community of Small Schools ==
For an eight-year period, from 2004 to 2012, the large school housed three separate smaller schools called the Castlemont Community of Small Schools. The smaller schools were known by the names:

- Castlemont Leadership Preparatory High (10–12)
- Castlemont Business and Information Technology School (10–12) (CBITIS)
- East Oakland School of the Arts (10–12)
- Freshman Prep Academy (FPA)

A similar smaller school experiment was going on at the Fremont Federation of High Schools. The school opened back under the reunified name "Castlemont High School" in the fall of 2012.

== Alumni ==
Notable alumni of Castlemont include:

- Burton Paul Christenson, member of E Company, 506th Infantry Regiment during World War II
- Carole Ward Allen, former BART director and Oakland port commissioner
- Charlie Brown (born 1948), former NFL wide receiver for the Detroit Lions
- Theodore Cohen (1928–2021) exhibition designer
- Kali Muscle (born 1975), actor, author, bodybuilder, social media personality, and entertainer
- Randy Sparks (1933–2024), singer and songwriter, the Christie Minstrels
- Larry Graham, former bass player with Sly and the Family Stone
- Steve Howard (born 1963), former MLB player
- Fred Korematsu (1919–2005), Japanese Internment activist, civil rights leader
- Leroy Reams (born 1943), Major League Baseball player for Philadelphia Phillies
- Joe Morgan (1943–2020), baseball Hall of Famer, class of 1962
- Clifford T. Robinson (born 1960), professional basketball player in the NBA, class of 1977
- Fred Silva (1927–2004), NFL official from 1968 to 1988, referee for Super Bowl XIV
- Steve Reeves (1926–2000), class of 1944, actor in Hercules (1958 film), bodybuilder
- Gary Pettis (born 1958), Major League Baseball player, current first base coach of the Houston Astros
- June Pointer (1953–2006), pop/R&B singer, the Pointer Sisters; dropped out early
- Richard "Dimples" Fields (1941–2000), R&B and soul singer
- Raphael Saadiq (born 1966), R&B singer
- Betty Reid Soskin (1921–2025), oldest National Park Ranger serving the United States
