= Betty Reid Soskin =

American Nation Park Service ranger (1921–2025)

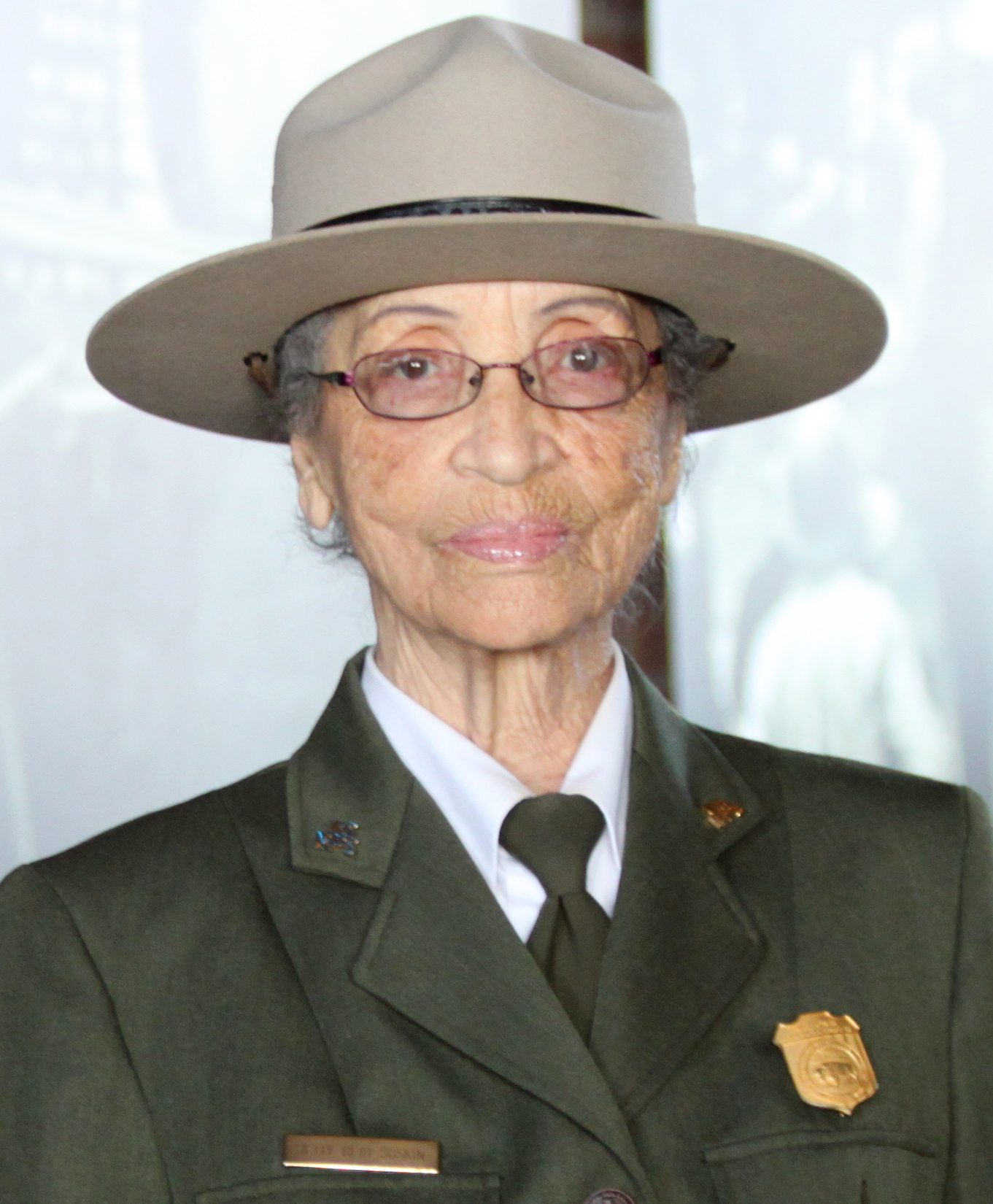
- Soskin in 2013
- Born: Betty Charbonnet; September 22, 1921; Detroit, Michigan, U.S.
- Died: December 21, 2025 (aged 104); Richmond, California, U.S.
- Education: Castlemont High School
- Occupation: National Park Service ranger
- Employer: National Park Service
- Spouses: Melvin Reid (m. 1943; div. 1972); William Soskin (m. 1978; died 1988)

Betty Reid Soskin (née Charbonnet; September 22, 1921 – December 21, 2025) was an American ranger with the National Park Service, assigned to the Rosie the Riveter World War II Home Front National Historical Park in Richmond, California. Until her retirement on March 31, 2022, at the age of 100, she was the oldest serving National Park Service ranger in the United States.

== Early life and education ==
Betty Charbonnet was born in Detroit, Michigan, on September 22, 1921, to Dorson Louis Charbonnet and Lottie Breaux Allen, both Catholics and natives of Louisiana. Her father came from a Creole background, and her mother from a Cajun background. Her great-grandmother had been born into slavery in 1846. She spent her early childhood living in New Orleans, until a hurricane and flood destroyed her family's home and business in 1927, when her family then relocated to Oakland, California. She graduated from Castlemont High School in Oakland.

== Career ==
During World War II, she worked as a file clerk for Boilermakers Union A-36, an all-black union auxiliary. Her main job was filing change of address cards for the workers, who moved frequently.

In June 1945, she and her then-husband, Mel Reid, founded Reid's Records in Berkeley, California, a small black-owned business specializing in Gospel music. They moved to Walnut Creek, California, in the 1950s, where their children attended better public schools and an alternative private elementary and middle school called Pinel. The family encountered considerable racism, and she and her husband were subject to death threats after they built a home in the white suburb. The store closed in 2019.

She converted to Unitarianism and became active in the Mount Diablo Unitarian Universalist Church and the Black Caucus of the Unitarian Universalist Association, and in the 1960s became a well-known songwriter in the civil rights movement.

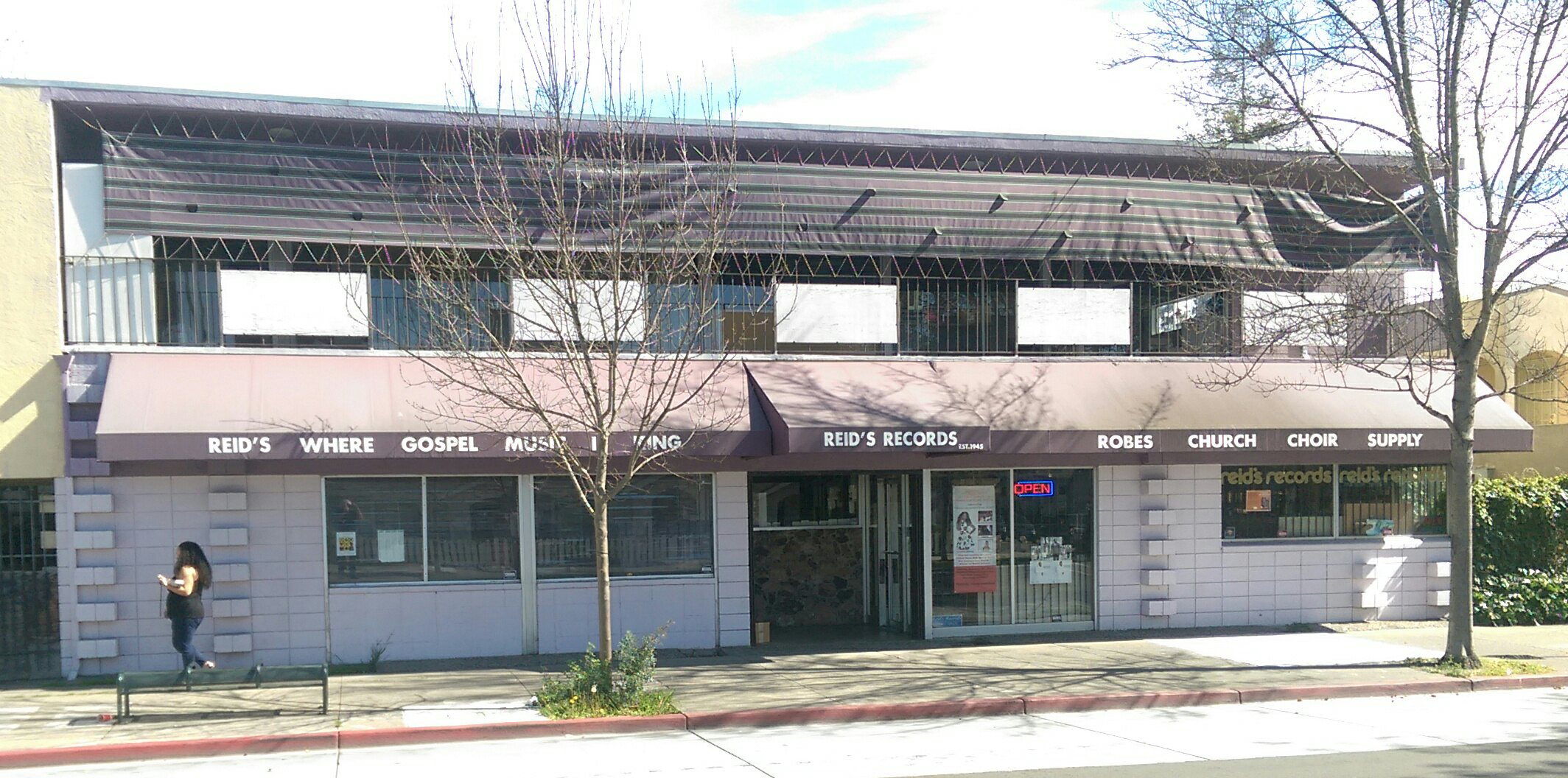
Reid's Records in Berkeley, California, 2014

She was divorced from Mel Reid in 1972, and subsequently married William Soskin, a psychology professor at the University of California, Berkeley. In 1978, after Mel Reid's health and finances had declined, she took over management of the music store, which led to her becoming active in area civic matters and a prominent community activist.

She later served as a field representative for California State Assemblywomen Dion Aroner and Loni Hancock, and in those positions became actively involved in the early planning stages and development of a park to memorialize the role of women on the home front during World War II. Those efforts came to fruition when Rosie the Riveter World War II Home Front National Historical Park was established in 2000, to provide a site where future generations could remember the contributions women made to the war effort.

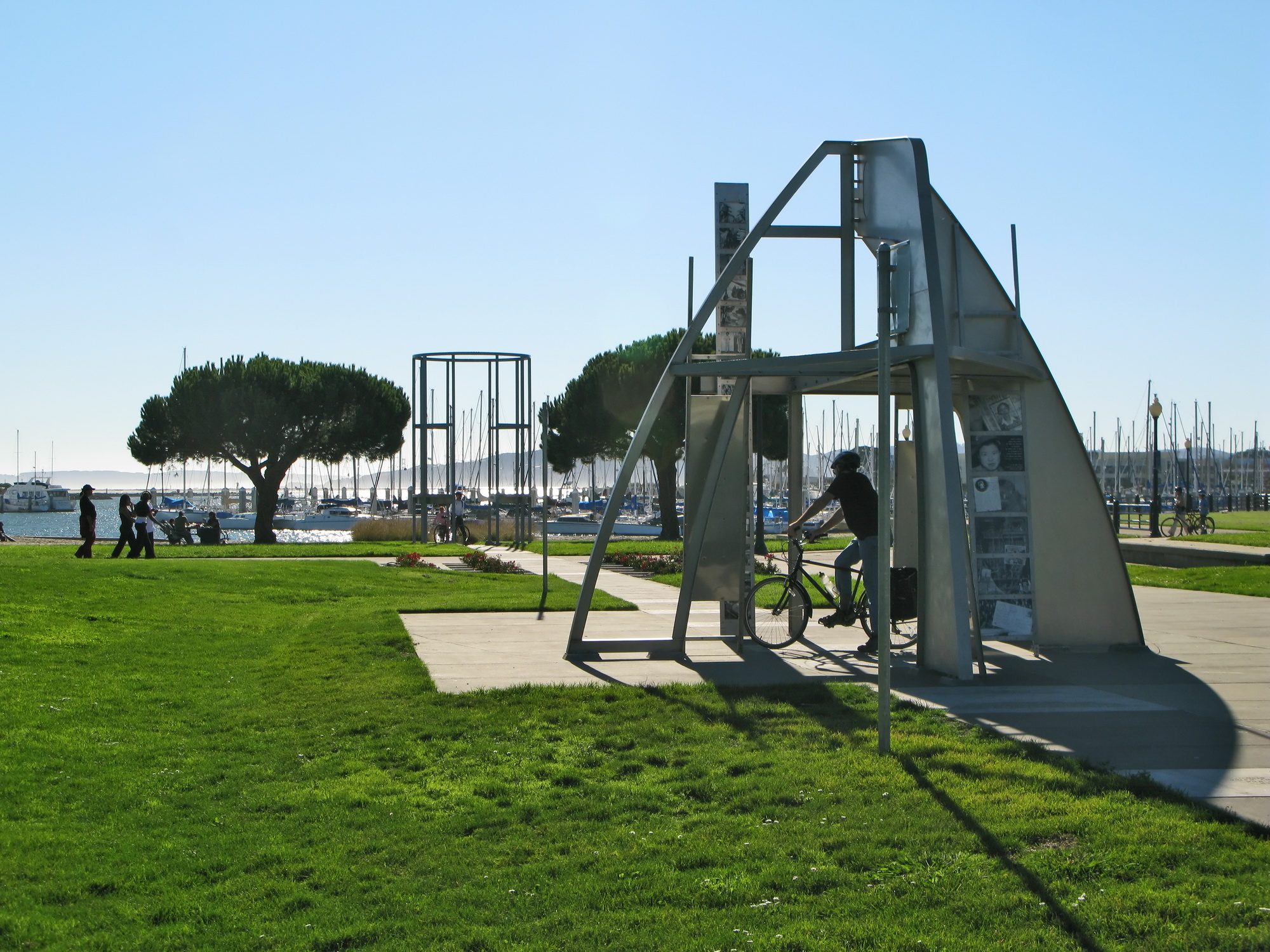
The Rosie Memorial in Rosie the Riveter World War II Home Front National Historical Park, Richmond, California

Reflecting on her own role in planning for the park's creation, and on how she brought her personal recollections of the conditions for African American women working in that still segregated environment to bear on the planning efforts, she has said that, often, she "was the only person in the room who had any reason to remember that ... what gets remembered is a function of who's in the room doing the remembering."

In 2003, she left her state job and became a consultant at the park she helped create before becoming a National Park Service ranger in 2007 at the age of 85.

Soskin's duties included conducting park tours and serving as an interpreter, explaining the park's purpose, history, various sites, and museum collections to park visitors. She has been celebrated as "a tireless voice for making sure the African-American wartime experience—both the positive steps toward integration and the presence of discrimination—has a prominent place in the Park's history."

Soskin said in 2015, at the age of 93: "Wish I'd had [the] confidence when the young Betty needed it to navigate through the hazards of everyday life on the planet. But maybe I'm better able to benefit from having it now—when I have the maturity to value it and the audacity to wield it for those things held dear."

She released her memoir, Sign My Name to Freedom, in February 2018. A feature-length documentary about Soskin's involvement with music, also titled Sign My Name to Freedom, began filming in 2016.

== Retirement and death ==
Soskin had a stroke while working at the park in September 2019 and returned to work in a limited, informal capacity in January 2020. She retired from the National Park Service on March 31, 2022, as the oldest serving park ranger.

Soskin died at her home in Richmond, on December 21, 2025, at the age of 104.

== Honors and legacy ==
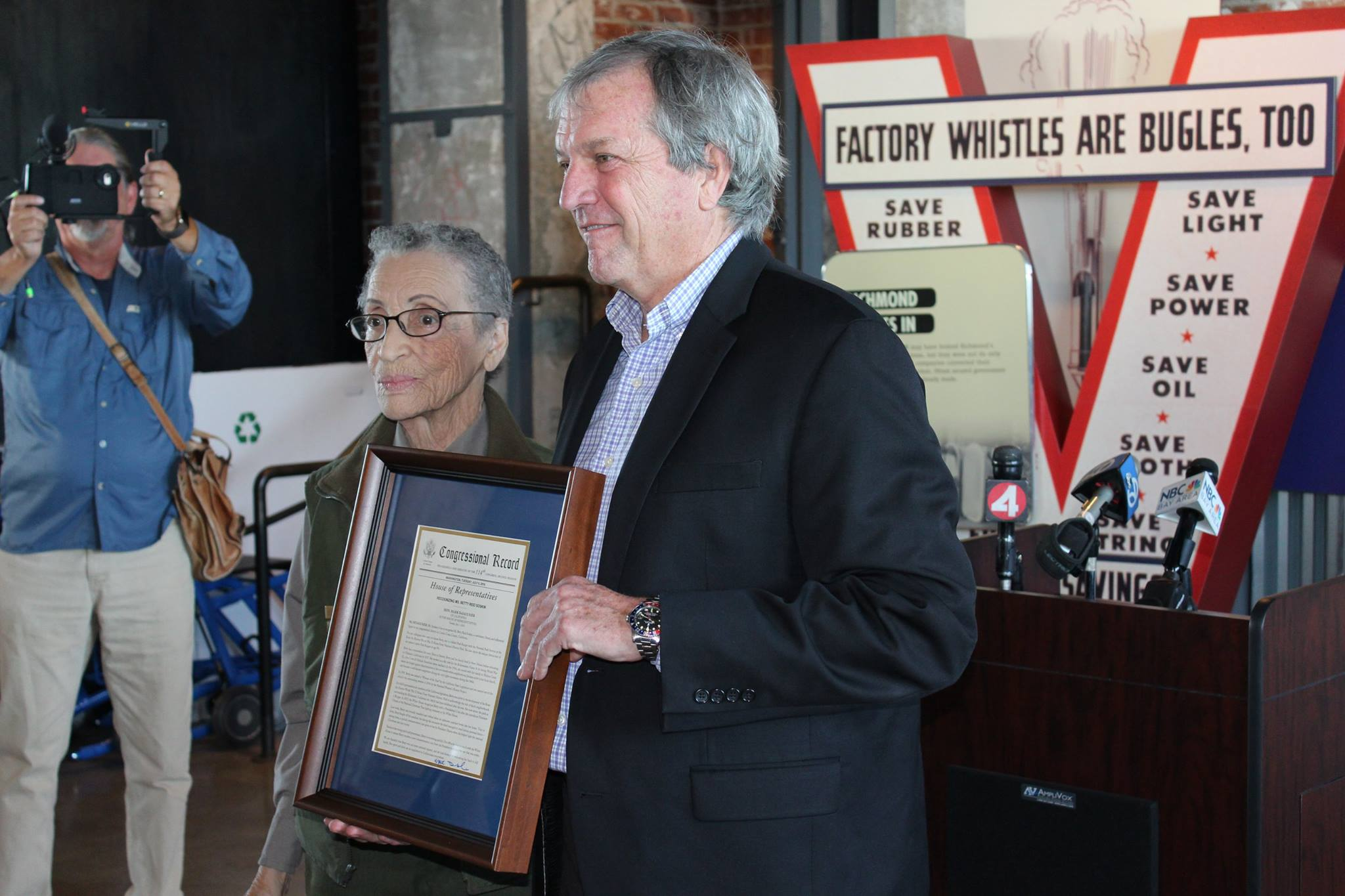
Reid Soskin receiving a congressional recognition from Mark DeSaulnier in 2020.

- California Woman of the Year, California State Legislature, 1995
- Builders of Communities and Dreams, National Women's History Project, 2005
- Cited in "Wherever There's a Fight: The History of the ACLU in California" by Elaine Elinson and Stan Yogi, 2009
- Attended President Obama's Inauguration as a guest of Rep. George Miller, 2009
- Honorary doctorate from California College of the Arts, 2011
- Commemorative presidential coin, 2015; it was stolen from her in a home robbery in 2016, but later in 2016 she received a new one.
- The National WWII Museum Silver Service Medallion, at the American Spirit Awards gala, 2016
- Recognition in the Congressional Record, 2016.
- Honorary doctorate of arts and letters from Mills College, 2017
- The Robin W. Winks Award for Enhancing Public Understanding of National Parks from the National Parks Conservation Association, 2018
- Recognition in the Congressional Record, 2019

In celebration of her 100th birthday on September 22, 2021, the West Contra Costa Unified School District renamed Juan Crespí Middle School to Betty Reid Soskin Middle School.

A stage musical based on her life, Sign My Name to Freedom by Michael Gene Sullivan with songs by Soskin, was premiered by San Francisco Bay Area Theatre Company in March 2024.
