= Reid's Records =

Historic black-owned record store in Berkeley, California

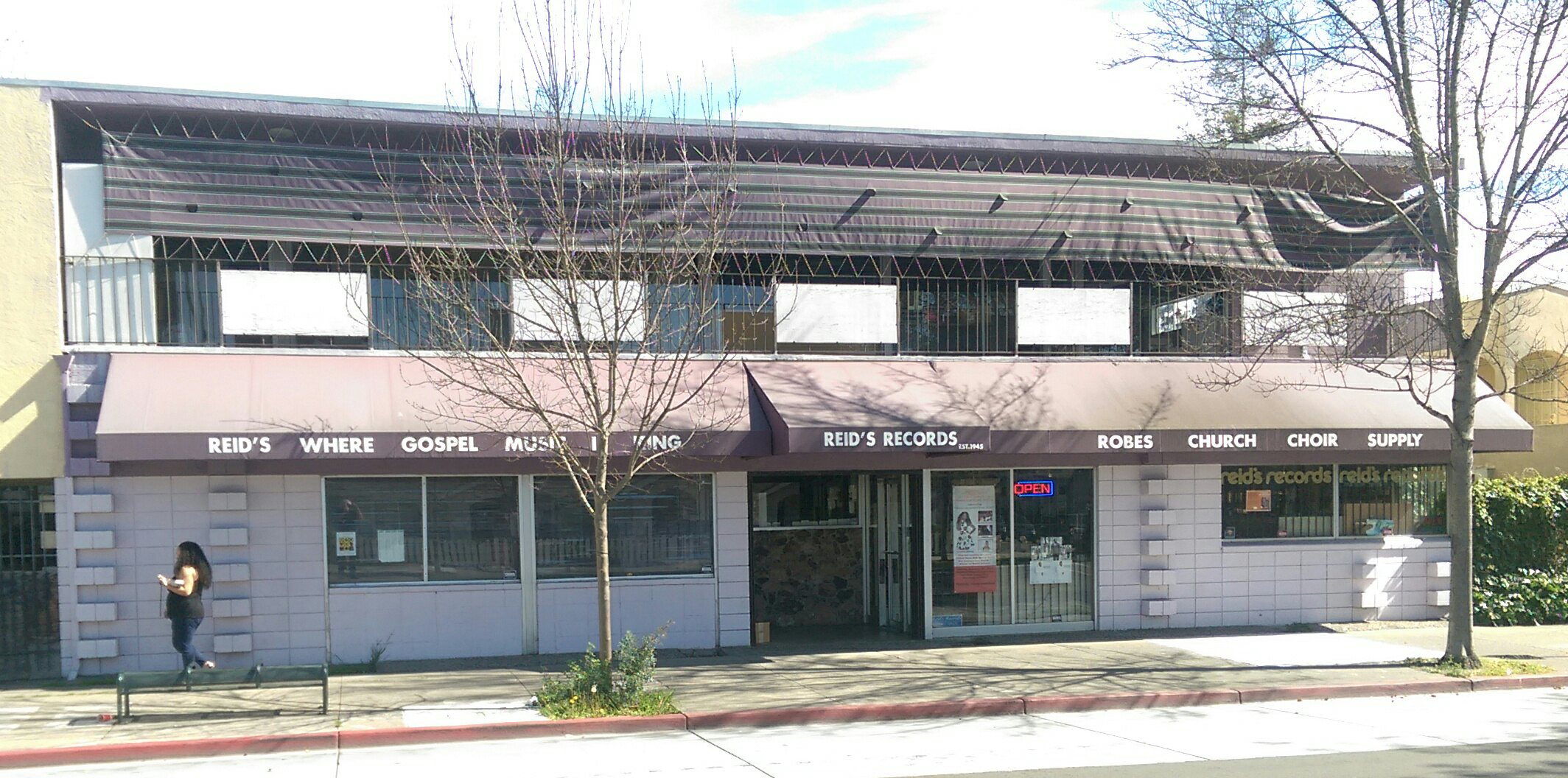
- Industry: Record Stores
- Founded: June 1, 1945; 81 years ago in Berkeley, California
- Founders: Mel Reid, Betty Reid Soskin
- Defunct: October 19, 2019
- Headquarters: 3101 Sacramento St., Berkeley, California, United States
- Number of locations: 2
- Area served: San Francisco Bay Area, California

Reid's Records was a historic black-owned record shop and East Bay institution that operated for almost 75 years in Berkeley, California. At the time it closed down in October 2019, it was the oldest record shop in California, and one of the oldest black-owned businesses of any kind in the San Francisco Bay Area.

== History ==
=== The postwar years ===
Reid's Records was originally established by local sports hero Melvin "Mel" Reid and his then-wife Betty Reid Soskin on June 1, 1945, using the ground floor of the duplex they lived in. The plan was to sell race records -- music that no white-owned business would sell -- to the burgeoning African-American population in the Bay Area, which had quadrupled because of the war effort. However, the record store wasn't the initial vehicle for this. Mel had first planned to start up a black jukebox business, but quickly discovered that retail was much more lucrative, as there was virtually no competition at the time for a business that sold black music.

Mel worked at Kaiser Shipyards to earn money to buy records for inventory, while Betty sold the records retail through a window in their garage. They started to invest in advertising: when Wynonie Harris released his landmark 78 record "Around the Clock", the Reids bought time on KRE to play the record and advertise it was available for sale at their establishment. This proved to be a breakthrough in the store's fortunes, bringing in immediate crowds of customers.

At that point, the store still sold primarily jazz and blues music. In 1947, Mel launched a radio program on KRE named "Gospel Gems", and quickly became the leading DJ of black Gospel music in the Bay Area. In 1951, Mel's uncle, Paul Reid, took over Mel's radio spot on KRE and became an extremely successful gospel DJ in his own right, later adding a second show "Spirituals at 6" to his slate, and then switching from KRE to KDIA.

Paul and Mel branched out into the live music side of the business, working as promoters for the Oakland Auditorium with leading acts in the genre such as the Staple Singers, Five Blind Boys of Mississippi, James Cleveland, The Caravans, Davis Sisters, the Staple Singers, the Ward Singers, the Rev C. L. Franklin and his teenage daughter, a young Aretha Franklin. The pair organized annual gospel extravaganza concerts with big-name acts, that also featured attractions like choir competitions, where the "winners" were awarded lavish trophy cups. Mel continued to lean more heavily into gospel in Reid's Records, which further expanded their business. The Reids moved their operations out of their garage and into the storefront next door to their duplex. They quickly became the largest retailer of gospel records in the state of California, and Paul and Mel became the most successful gospel promoters on the West Coast. Paul started a Reid's Records record label, releasing singles by local gospel acts like The Lathanettes.

In 1952, the Reid family moved into a house in Walnut Creek, California, and Betty largely dropped out of the day-to-day operation of the store in order to raise the family's four children. They opened a second Reid's Records in nearby Oakland, California, and started buying up residential property around the Berkeley Reid's.

=== The 1960s and downturn ===
Paul Reid died of tuberculosis, leaving Mel without an active business partner and promoter of Reid's Records. Mel took on a job as the manager for the Edwin Hawkins Singers, which diverted his attention from his business at home at a moment when the fortunes of the business were beginning to turn.

As black music genres multiplied, Reid's Records started to carry new idioms like funk and soul. But as more white stores embraced black music, Reid's Records no longer had the market cornered on black music in the area, competing with the likes of Rasputin Music and Tower Records. Reid's Records were still unchallenged when it came to gospel music, however, which kept the store alive. Reid tried to align the store with the hippie movement that had become virtually synonymous with Berkeley, stocking the store with bongs and blacklight posters, but this failed to attract new clientele. By the time the 1970s rolled around, the store had fallen on hard times. The Oakland store was closed.

Mel and Betty divorced in 1972, and Melvin took over sole operation of the original Berkeley store. Betty remarried. By 1978, Mel's health and finances had declined severely. He had incurred significant gambling debts, lost all the property the family had acquired in previous years (including the family home), and had had both of his legs amputated due to complications from diabetes. Betty had to take over the operation of the store once more. The store was on the verge of foreclosure, saddled with huge debts, and Betty intended to let it close. On reflection, she realized what an institution the store had become, and decided to fight to keep it open. She negotiated with the store's creditors, and reoriented the store's identity to focus on the main genre keeping the store afloat -- gospel -- and eliminated things like drug paraphernalia from the store's offerings. The store even shifted away from carrying music, to an extent, and positioned itself as a one stop shop for the African-American church experience, adding products like sheet music, Bibles and other Christian literature, church offering envelopes, and choir robes. About 20% of their business continued to be the sale of jazz and blues records.

Betty got involved in local politics, convincing Gus Newport, then-mayor of Berkeley, to develop the derelict properties across the street from the store, which were being used to facilitate the illegal drug trade. For a time, the store seemed to modestly thrive again.

=== Later years and closure ===
Mel Reid died in 1987. In 1990, Betty passed ownership to Diara Reid, her daughter with Mel. Diara attempted to bring Reid's records back into the forefront of live gospel music in the area, promoting the likes of Shirley Caesar, Moses Tyson Jr., Emmit Powell, and Lee Williams and the Spiritual QC's on "Reid's Records' 65th Anniversary Tour", but the audience for gospel music in the Bay Area had declined sharply by this time, and the concert dates were not financially successful.

The Reid family attributed this loss to gentrification -- the African-American customer base just wasn't there any more -- to the changing tastes of youth culture, who moved away from physical media toward music streaming services, and to the rise of internet mega-businesses like Amazon.com.

The store closed for good on October 19, 2019.
