= Women in the National Park Service =

Throughout the first century of the United States National Park Service (NPS), the organization's workforce has grown more inclusive and gender-balanced. When the organization was formed in 1916, few female rangers worked within its ranks. As the organization grew, more women were hired into white-collar and clerical positions. As social activism and second-wave feminism movements gained ground in the 1960s and 70s, women were hired into more diverse occupations and leadership roles within the NPS. Today, the National Park Service still faces a gender disparity with 37% of the workforce being female and has been criticized for its response to several sexual harassment cases.

== Early female rangers ==
Female rangers existed in the early 20th century in small numbers. Because of the rarity of encountering a female employee, these women's careers were often highly publicized. However, there are cases where the women did not receive publicity until several years, or even decades later.

Records show that the first paid female park ranger in the National Park Service was Esther Brazell at Wind Cave National Park. Brazell was hired as a park ranger in 1916, by her father Thomas W. Brazell. The salary was recorded as $50 US per month. Esther was hired again in the summer of 1917 to guide tours in the cave, at a salary of $75 US per month.

Other women were able to have brief careers with the Park Service due to the scarcity of available male employees, particularly during times of war. Claire Marie Hodges, known as the first female ranger at Yosemite National Park, was hired as a seasonal ranger in the summer of 1918, when the park was facing a shortage in able-bodied young men due to World War I. Unusually, Hodges had the same duties, and wore the same stetson hat and badge as her male colleagues, although she did not carry a gun.

Helen Wilson was appointed as a temporary park ranger at Glacier National Park on June 17, 1918. Notably, Wilson's salary matched that of four male park rangers hired at the same time, long before the Equal Pay Act of 1963. Wilson worked at the entrance station and also issued permits for people who wished to gather wildflowers.

Some, though not all, of the early female rangers were the wives or daughters of male NPS employees. A fairly well-known figure in the 1920s was Marguerite Lindsley, a junior student at Montana State College and the daughter of Yellowstone's assistant superintendent, who was popularly known as the "first woman ever to be named as a ranger at Yellowstone National Park." Lindsley's main qualification for the position was that she had "spent every summer of her life in the park", and thus familiar with not only the hills and valleys of the park, but with the birds and "beasts" as well.

One of the other early Yellowstone rangers was Mrs. Cal Peck, who met her husband, a ranger at Yellowstone National Park, when she visited the site as a tourist. The Pecks both went on to work as Park rangers at the Grand Canyon in 1922, where "her patrol is on the north side of the Grant Canyon running into Arizona, amid the most beautiful scenery of the park." Instead of a standardized uniform, Mrs. Peck wore a brown, homemade animal skin uniform during her patrols.

Historian Polly Welts Kaufman writes of the contributions of these early women park rangers, stating that "Although women... who did achieve park ranger status before the early 1970s have gone down in Park Service history as the first women rangers, they did not bring real change to the position of women in the Service. But they did demonstrate that women could do the job..."

=== Ranger wives ===
Although not employees themselves, many ranger wives had great influence over their husbands and, at times, the parks they called home. Horace Albright, the second director of the NPS, even described ranger wives more as "charming and versatile, competently to carry out, within the limits of their strength, their husband's varied assignments."

Some ranger wives also wrote about their experiences. Bears in My Kitchen was the memoir of Margaret Merrill, who had been a ranger wife at Yosemite from 1930 until the book was published in 1956.

Other women participated more directly. Helen Hartzog, wife of NPS Director George B. Hartzog Jr., became popularly known as the "First Lady" of the National Park Service due to her involvement with the organization. She acted as a trusted advisor for her husband during his tenure as director, fostered an increased sense of community within the growing organization, and assisted with the growth of the NPS's burgeoning Volunteers In Parks (VIP) program.

== Expansion of the National Park Service ==
Gender relations within the Park Service changed dramatically in the 1960s and 1970s, as the expansion of the NPS coincided with New Left social movements and second wave feminism. In 1960, the National Park Service issued a written statement on employment, urging officials to consider applicants based on qualifications and regardless of gender. However, the same directive goes on to state "women cannot be employed in certain jobs, such as Park Ranger or Seasonal Park Ranger...in which the employee is subject to be called to fight fires, take part in rescue operations, or do other strenuous or hazardous work..." but that "[p]articipation by women employees in lecture programs, guided tours, museum and library work, and in research programs would be entirely appropriate and very helpful in many Parks. Increased attention may also be given to children's programs in some Parks and to extension work to schools for which women interpretive employees may be even more effective than men."

Another step came nationally in 1962, when Attorney General Robert F. Kennedy invalidated an old law that allowed appointments to specify by gender. As the Service itself expanded and interpretive functions began to take increased precedence, more and more women were employed. Sometimes not referred to as "rangers", many of these employees were instead called park naturalists, historians, or information guides until the term "ranger" was finally used institutionally to describe women in 1971.

Women began to steadily make up more of the workforce throughout the last decades of the 20th century. In 1969, the Office of Personnel Management (OPM) enacted new standards intended to remove gender specific qualifications. Title IX was enacted in 1972, and more women were able to gain the qualifications needed to be employed with the Park Service. After legal action, a five-foot eight-inch height requirement for the U.S. Park Police was removed in 1972, and women began receiving training for Law Enforcement positions at the Federal Law Enforcement Training Center in 1975.

Women entering the Park Service did face push-back from male colleagues and visitors. Women were sometimes referred to as "Rangerettes" and "Nature Fakers." An historian and former Superintendent of Lyndon B. Johnson National Historical Park, Melody Webb stated that she stated that "it didn't occur to me that being a woman made any difference. It did, "and that women in the NPS "took getting used to."

=== Women and the NPS uniform ===
Early uniform standardization measures failed to include any guidelines for female employees. The first version of a female ranger uniform emerged in 1947, modeled after the Women's Auxiliary Army Corps military uniform, reflecting the early NPS's connection with the military. In the 1960s, the uniform was updated to closely model those worn by American Airlines flight attendants. Complaints over the stewardess-type uniform led to a NPS initiative to redesign the female uniform in 1970. The result was a tan uniform complete with short skirt and go-go boots. After this was deemed impractical, it was replaced with two options, a wildly unpopular "A line", or "McDonald's" uniform and what was called the "Women's Traditional Uniform", which was basically the same as the men's. Finally, in 1978, women were authorized to wear the modern "green and gray" uniform.

Women were also unable to wear the NPS badge until 1978, instead being issued a small arrowhead pin to attach to their uniforms.

== Modern controversy ==
As the NPS celebrated its Centennial in 2016, issues with diversity and gender relations are still present.

=== Continued lack of diversity ===
In 2015, women made up only 37% of the National Park Service workforce. In Law Enforcement positions, only 15% of employees were female.

=== Accusations of sexual harassment ===
Recently, a number of sexual harassment cases involving female employees of the National Park Service have come to light, leading the House Oversight and Government Reform Committee to characterize the issue as pervasive. Reports of systematic sexual harassment in the River District of Grand Canyon National Park spoke of a culture that not only ignored reports of harassment, but made women fear retribution if they took steps to file charges or demand consequences for their assailants. A widely read article in the Huffington Post, "Out Here, No One Can Hear You Scream", described the allegations in detail. Since then, women who were or are employed at many different parks have gone public with their stories of sexual harassment, including Canaveral National Seashore, Death Valley National Park, Yosemite National Park, and Yellowstone National Park

In the spring of 2016, NPS officials declared a "zero tolerance" policy on sexual harassment within the organization. But Congress committee members in September accused the Service of failing to take allegations seriously. In June 2016, Secretary of the Interior Sally Jewell admitted that the current reports of sexual harassment in the National Park Service were probably "just the tip of the iceberg."

== Notable female NPS employees ==
Among the women who held leadership and upper-level management positions within the National Park Service, or had a strong influence on National Park Service policy or gender relations, are:

Park rangers

- Enid Michael, first ranger-naturalist in Yosemite and the first female ranger in the National Parks system, 1921-1942
- Betty Reid Soskin, Rosie the Riveter WWII Homefront NHP, 2011 to 2022;

Early superintendents (not comprehensive)

- Gertrude S. Cooper, Supt. Vanderbilt Mansion NHS, 7/16/40 to 5/31/45;
- Margaret J. Patterson, Supt. Andrew Johnson NHS, Acting Supt. 10/7/42 to 3/3/43; Custodian 3/4/43 to 4/24/43;
- Wilhelmina S. Harris, Supt. Adams National Historic Site, Supt. 11/27/50 to 1/10/70 (retired);
- Carol A. Martin, Supt. Tuzigoot National Monument, 4/26/71 to 8/17/74;
- Kathleen L. Dilonardo, Supt. Fort Caroline N. Memorial, 11/14/71 to 11/23/75;
- Elizabeth Disrude, Supt. Perry's Victory & Interna. Peace Memorial Natl. Monument, 3/1/72 to 4/8/75;
- Doris I. Omundson, Supt. John Muir NHS, 1/21/73 to 5/31/80;
- L. Lorraine Mintzmyer, Supt. Herbert Hoover NHS, 7/8/73 to 8/16/75;
- Marjorie M. Hackett, Supt. Fort Point NHS, 4/14/74 to 3/12/77;
- Ellen Lang, Supt. Sitka NHP, 5/12/74 to 4/30/78;
- Janet Wolf, Supt. Fort Frederica NM, 9/18/74 to 1/25/80;
- Georgia Ellard, Rock Creek Park (1977–1988);

Deputy regional directors

- Lorraine Mintzmyer, Southwest Region, appointed by John Cook;
- Mary Bradford, Southwest Region, appointed by John Cook, 1992-post 1993;
- Sandy Walters, National Capital Region, 6/92-post 1993.

Regional directors

- Lorraine Mintzmyer, Southwest Region. Aug. 12, 1979, Rocky Mountain Region, April 6, 1980, and Mid-Atlantic Region, Oct. 6, 1991, appointed by Director William Whalen in both cases;
- Marie Rust, North Atlantic Region, 1/92 to present, appointed by Director Ridenour;
- B. J. Griffin, Mid-Atlantic Region, 8/8/93 to present, appointed by Director Kennedy.
- Karen Wade, Intermountain Region

Secretary to the Director (not comprehensive)

- Isabelle Story (1888–1970) was secretary to Director Steve Mather.

Director

- Fran P. Mainella was the first female director of the National Park Service (the 16th director), named by Secretary of the Interior Gale Norton.
- Mary A. Bomar was appointed the 17th director in 2006. She served through the end of President George W. Bush's second term.
