= Good News About Mental Health =

Studio album by the Afflicted
- Released: 1985
- Studio: The Automatt, San Francisco; Time Enough; World Enough Studios, San Francisco; Studio D, Sausalito
- Label: Infrasonic
- Producer: Dan Levitan

Good News About Mental Health is the first and only studio album by the San Francisco-based skate punk band the Afflicted. It was released on vinyl on Infrasonic Records in 1985 (ILP01). Thrasher wrote "The Afflicted provide sloppy, fun thrills for the aural craving. These guys have a buncha styles all wrapped up into one easy-to-use musical fun-fest…a fine, noisy record." Option's review described it as "Funny, cynical semi-thrash post-punk with rock and metal overtones…The general atmosphere is manic but controlled, the vocals are clear and understandable, and the music is energetic and unadorned."

== Track listing ==
Side one

1. "Summer of Love" (Dan Rancid, Daryl Bach, Barry Wilder, Frankie John Lennon) – 2:11
2. "Rock and Roll" (Jimmy Page, Robert Plant, John Paul Jones, John Bonham) – 1:32
3. "Living on Beer" (Rancid, Bach, Dirty Al, Lennon) – 2:35
4. "Schizoid Baby" (Rancid, Bach) – 3:24
5. "Daddy's Girl" (Rancid, Bach, Lennon) – 1:32
6. "After the Catastrophe" (Lennon, Wilder, Rancid, Bach) – 3:30

Side two

1. "Here Come the Cops" (Rancid, Williams, Kreitser, Bach) – 2:20
2. "Sold Us to the Martians" (Rancid, Bach, Lennon, Wilder) – 2:56
3. "Dope Dreams" (Lennon) – 1:28
4. "Punk for the FBI" (Rancid, Kevin Callahan) – 1:58
5. "Ice Age" (Afflicted) – 2:11
6. "Jonesin' for Your Love" (Afflicted) – 3:44
7. "Sweet Jane" (Lou Reed) – 5:32

== Personnel ==
- Daryl Bach – drums
- Frankie John Lennon – bass, vocals, lead vocals on "Dope Dreams"
- Dan Rancid – lead vocals
- Michael Voss – guitar
- Barry Wilder – additional guitars
- The Haight Street Boys Choir – backing vocals

Production

- Daniel Levitin – producer
- Paul Mandl – engineer
- Ken Kessie – remixing engineer
- Maureen Droney – engineer
- Wayne Lewis – engineer
- John Golden – mastering
- Recorded at The Automatt, San Francisco, Time Enough, World Enough Studios, San Francisco, and Studio D, Sausalito
