= Shooting Shark =

- UK 12" single cover

Single by Blue Öyster Cult

from the album The Revölution by Night
- Released: February 1984
- Length: 4:20 (single edit); 7:07 (album version)
- Label: Columbia
- Songwriter(s): Donald Roeser; Patti Smith
- Producer(s): Bruce Fairbairn

Blue Öyster Cult singles chronology
"Take Me Away" (1983)	"Shooting Shark" (1984)	"Perfect Water" (1985)

Music video
- Shooting Shark on YouTube

"Shooting Shark" is a song by American hard rock band Blue Öyster Cult, appearing on the band's ninth album The Revölution by Night. Written by guitarist/vocalist Donald "Buck Dharma" Roeser with lyrics inspired by a Patti Smith poem, the song features a synthesizer-heavy pop sound mixed with rock elements. The song features Randy Jackson, of future American Idol fame, on bass.

The song tells the story of a man in a bad relationship, who wants to be done with the woman. Each time he breaks up with her, everything he sees reminds him of her, and he eventually returns. This has happened three times, and at the end of the song he's returning for the fourth, which he says will be the last.

"Shooting Shark" was a modest success, peaking at #83 on the Billboard Hot 100, as well as #16 on the Billboard Mainstream Rock chart.

== Reception ==
AllMusic reviewer William Ruhlmann picked the song as an Allmusic reviewer's pick. Errol Somay of Rolling Stone noted the song's saxophone solo, stating it "remind[s] us that Blue Öyster Cult are capable songwriters at both ends of the rock & roll Richter scale".

== Track listing ==
American 7" single

Side A
No.	Title	Writer(s)	Length
1.	"Shooting Shark"	Roeser, Smith	4:20

Side B
No.	Title	Writer(s)	Length
1.	"Dragon Lady"	Broadway Blotto, Roeser	4:04

American 12" single

Side A
No.	Title	Writer(s)	Length
1.	"Shooting Shark" (Edit)	Roeser, Smith	4:20
2.	"Shooting Shark"	Roeser, Smith	7:07

Side B
No.	Title	Writer(s)	Length
1.	"Take Me Away"	Eric Bloom, Aldo Nova	4:26
2.	"Eyes On Fire"	Gregg Winter	3:54

European 7" single

Side A
No.	Title	Writer(s)	Length
1.	"Shooting Shark"	Roeser, Smith	4:20

Side B
No.	Title	Writer(s)	Length
1.	"Feel the Thunder"	Bloom	5:47

UK 12" single

Side A
No.	Title	Writer(s)	Length
1.	"Shooting Shark" (Extended Version)	Roeser, Smith	7:07

Side B
No.	Title	Writer(s)	Length
1.	"Dragon Lady"	Blotto, Roeser	4:04

== Personnel ==
Blue Öyster Cult

- Donald "Buck Dharma" Roeser – vocals, lead guitar, keyboards
- Allen Lanier – keyboards
- Rick Downey – drums

Additional musicians

- Randy Jackson – bass
- Larry Fast – synthesizers, programming
- Marc Baum – saxophone

== Charts ==
Chart (1983–1984)	Peak position
UK Singles (OCC)	97
US Billboard Hot 100	83
US Mainstream Rock (Billboard)	16
