= Enid Michael =

Ranger-naturalist for the National Park Service

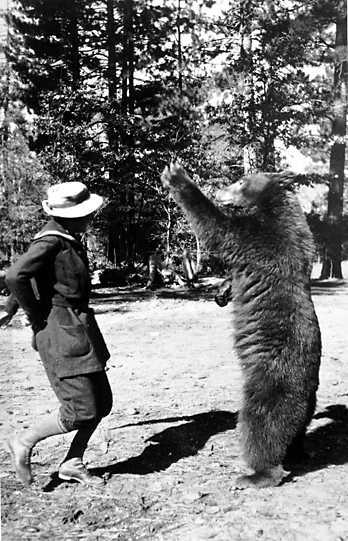
- Enid Michael dancing with a black bear
- Born: Enid Reeve; May 27, 1883; Gilroy, California
- Died: February 11, 1966 (aged 82); Pasadena, California
- Occupation: National Park Service ranger
- Employer: National Park Service
- Known for: Mountaineering, botany

Enid Michael was an American ranger with the National Park Service, assigned to Yosemite National Park in California. She was the first ranger-naturalist in Yosemite and the first female ranger in the National Parks system. Michael was also an accomplished mountaineer and botanist.

== Early life ==
Enid Reeve was born in Gilroy, California, in 1883. Her family moved to Los Angeles in 1897 and later to Pasadena, California. She attended the State Normal School at Los Angeles and went on to become a third-grade school teacher.

She met her future husband, Charles Michael, at an event for the Sierra Club. After getting married in 1919, she took up residence in Yosemite National Park, where her husband was the assistant postmaster at the time.

== Career ==
Michael was appointed as a seasonal ranger for the National Park Service in 1921, and would continue in this role until 1942.

Over the course of her career, Michael published over 500 papers on the flora and fauna of Yosemite National Park. Her writings represent the largest quantity of writing about Yosemite authored by a single individual. She was credited with discovering numerous species of birds and plants that had not been previously sighted in Yosemite. Michael collaborated with botanist Alice Eastwood, bringing her rare plant specimens for identification.

During her tenure as a park ranger, Michael's status was "resented by some of her male colleagues, who believed that no woman should occupy such a position". In 1934, she was dismissed from her job as a park ranger, but then brought back on after intervention by the park's director. Michael would continue to work seasonally for eight more years until 1942; in 1943, all seasonal ranger-naturalist roles were abolished for the duration of World War II.

Michael was credited for creating and maintaining a wildflower garden located behind the building of the Yosemite Museum. It was estimated that the garden held more than 1,000 plants.

She served as custodian of the Sierra Club's LeConte Memorial Lodge for several summers in the 1940s and 1950s.

== Death and legacy ==
Michael died on February 11, 1966, due to Alzheimer's disease. Her contribution to exploring Yosemite has been compared with the efforts of John Muir and James Mason Hutchings.

Michael was considered an "accomplished mountaineer", and both her and her husband climbed multiple mountains within Yosemite. They often climbed ropeless, with Michael commenting that "a rope could be an insult to the mountains."

Michael is portrayed in the historical fiction novel The View from Half Dome by author Jill Caugherty. In the novel, Michael introduces the main character to "the wildlife and wild-flowers and schools her about the natural world around them".

== Bibliography ==
- The Joy of Yosemite: Selected Writings of Enid Michael, Pioneer Ranger Naturalist. Rancho Palos Verdes, California: Quaking Aspen Books (2004). ISBN 9781886502437
