= Theodore Cohen (designer) =

American exhibition designer (1928–2021)

Theodore H. Cohen (April 27, 1928 – June 29, 2021) commonly known as Ted Cohen, was an American exhibition designer. He was named the American Craft Council's Honorary Fellow in 2000.

== Life and career ==
Theodore H. Cohen was born April 27, 1928, in Oakland, California. He graduated in 1945 from Castlemont High School in Oakland. After high school he joined the United States Army at the end of World War II, he was posted in Japan as a sign-painter. He was color blind.

Cohen studied fine art on the G.I. Bill at the California College of Arts and Crafts (now California College of the Arts) in Oakland. Cohen worked as exhibition designer at the Oakland Museum of California (OMCA) for more than 50 years.

Cohen died at age 93 from an undiagnosed case of leukemia on June 29, 2021, in a hospice in California. He was the subject of the posthumous retrospective exhibition, The Object In Its Place: As Designed By Ted Cohen (2022), curated by Carol Covington at the Museum of Craft and Design in San Francisco.
