= Steve Howard (baseball) =

American baseball player

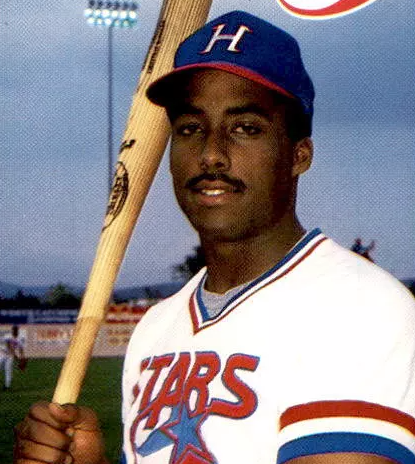
- Howard with the Huntsville Stars c. 1988
- Outfielder
- Born: December 7, 1963 (age 62); Oakland, California, U.S.
- Batted: Right Threw: Right

MLB debut
- June 16, 1990, for the Oakland Athletics

Last MLB appearance
- July 17, 1990, for the Oakland Athletics

MLB statistics
- Games played: 21
- Batting average: .231
- Runs scored: 5
- Stats at Baseball Reference

Teams
- Oakland Athletics (1990)

Steven Bernard Howard (born December 7, 1963) is an American former Major League Baseball outfielder. He played for the Oakland Athletics during the 1990 season. Howard played for Laney College and Castlemont High School.
