= Happy Hour (Humans album) =

Studio album by Humans
- Released: November 1981
- Venue: Automatt Studios
- Genre: New wave
- Label: I.R.S.
- Producer: David Kahne

Happy Hour is the debut full-length by new wave band Humans' and was released in 1981 on I.R.S. Records, and recorded at the famed Automatt studio in San Francisco under the direction of producer David Kahne. The songs "Don't Be Afraid of the Dark"/"Get You Tonight" and "Lightning" were released as a radio station promo single. Lead singer Sterling Storm directed a longform music video based on this album. The videotape, entitled Happy Hour with the Humans, was distributed by Mike Nesmith's pioneering company, Pacific Arts Video.

== Track listing ==
All tracks written by Sterling Storm, except #3 & #8 by Eric Gies.

1. "Get You Tonight" (3:09)
2. "Lightning" (4:02)
3. "Don't Be Afraid Of The Dark" (3:09)
4. "Change" (3:44)
5. "Foreign Culture" (4:43)
6. "Invisible Man" (3:40)
7. "Waiting At The Station" (3:04)
8. "You Don't Want To Know" (3:09)
9. "Lost Control" (3:45)
10. "Obituary" (6:10)

== Personnel ==
=== Humans ===
- Sterling Storm: Rhythm guitar, vocals
- John Anderson: Lead guitar
- David Larstein: Keyboards
- Eric Gies: Bass
- Jim Norris: Drums

=== Additional Personnel ===
- Jim Rutledge: Bass on "Foreign Culture"
- Rick Walker: Percussion on "Foreign Culture"
