= The Revölution by Night =

- Cover art by Greg Scott

Studio album by Blue Öyster Cult
- Released: November 8, 1983
- Studios: Boogie Hotel Studios, Port Jefferson, New York; Kingdom Sound Studios, Long Island, New York; The Automatt – Studio C, San Francisco, California
- Genres: Hard rock; pop rock; heavy metal
- Length: 41:44
- Label: Columbia
- Producer: Bruce Fairbairn

Blue Öyster Cult chronology
Extraterrestrial Live (1982)	The Revölution by Night (1983)	Club Ninja (1985)

Singles from The Revölution by Night
- 1. "Take Me Away" Released: November 1983; 2. "Shooting Shark" Released: February 1984

Professional ratings
Review scores
Source	Rating
AllMusic	2/5 stars
Collector's Guide to Heavy Metal	8/10
Rolling Stone	3/5 stars

The Revölution by Night is the ninth studio album by American rock band Blue Öyster Cult, released on November 8, 1983. The album was intended to capitalize on the success of Fire of Unknown Origin two years prior, hence the blend of straight-ahead rock and pop elements. This was the first BÖC album not to feature all of the band's classic members, drummer Albert Bouchard having been fired during the previous tour and replaced by roadie Rick Downey.

In contrast to the success of Fire of Unknown Origin, the album failed to go Gold in the United States.

== Songs ==
Lead single "Shooting Shark" was modestly successful on radio, reaching #83 and #16 on the Billboard Hot 100 and Mainstream Rock charts, respectively. Its accompanying video became one of MTV's most requested clips upon its release. The lyrics to "Shooting Shark" were based on a poem by Patti Smith.

"Take Me Away," co-written by Eric Bloom and Canadian rock musician Aldo Nova, also received significant airplay on AOR radio stations. An earlier version of the song, titled "Psycho Ward", was being written by Nova before Bloom offered to contribute some lyrics, coming up with the chorus. The song reached #11 on the Billboard Mainstream Rock chart.

== Track listing ==
All lead vocals by Eric Bloom, except where noted.

Side one
No.	Title	Writer(s)	Lead vocals	Length
1.	"Take Me Away"	Eric Bloom, Aldo Nova		4:31
2.	"Eyes on Fire"	Gregg Winter		3:56
3.	"Shooting Shark"	Donald Roeser, Patti Smith	Roeser	7:09
4.	"Veins"	Roeser, Richard Meltzer	Roeser	3:59

Side two
No.	Title	Writer(s)	Lead vocals	Length
5.	"Shadow of California"	Joe Bouchard, Sandy Pearlman, Neal Smith		5:10
6.	"Feel the Thunder"	Bloom		5:48
7.	"Let Go"	Bloom, Roeser, Ian Hunter		3:28
8.	"Dragon Lady"	Roeser, Broadway Blotto	Roeser	4:08
9.	"Light Years of Love"	Bouchard, Helen Wheels	Bouchard	4:05

== Personnel ==
Band members

- Eric Bloom – guitar, vocals
- Donald 'Buck Dharma' Roeser – lead guitar, keyboards, vocals, mixing (uncredited)
- Allen Lanier – piano, keyboards
- Joe Bouchard – bass, electric and acoustic guitars, vocoder, vocals
- Rick Downey – drums

Additional musicians

- Larry Fast – synthesizers, programming
- Aldo Nova – guitar and synthesizers on "Take Me Away"
- Gregg Winter – backing vocals on "Eyes on Fire"
- Randy Jackson – bass on "Shooting Shark"
- Marc Baum – saxophone on "Shooting Shark"

Production

- Bruce Fairbairn – producer, mixing
- Dave Wittman – engineer
- George Geranios, Ken Kessie – additional engineering
- Chris Isca, Ron Coté, Ray Pyle – assistant engineers
- Bob Ludwig – mastering
- Sandy Pearlman – management, mixing (uncredited)
- Steve Schenck – management

== Charts ==
Chart (1983)	Peak position
UK Albums (Official Charts)	95
US Billboard 200	93
