= Marguerite Lindsley =

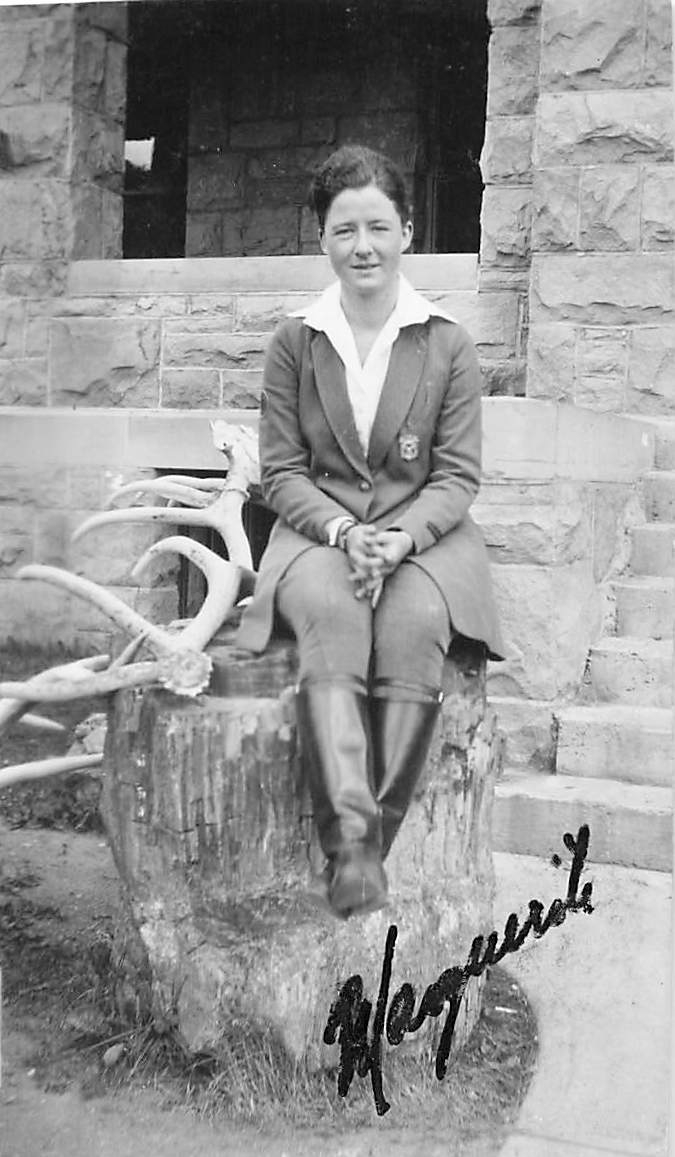

Jane Marguerite Lindsley (later Marguerite Lindsley Arnold; October 2, 1901 – May 18, 1952) was the first woman to be appointed to a year-round park ranger position in the United States National Park Service. Lindsley had a ten-year career as a ranger and as a ranger-naturalist starting in 1921.

== Early life and education ==
Lindsley was born and raised in Yellowstone—her father, Chester Lindsley, was the park’s superintendent while it was transitioning from the Army to the NPS. Growing up in Yellowstone gave Marguerite a unique opportunity to connect with the land. She received an education from her mother, Maude, at home for most of her life before college.

Lindsley attended Montana State College for her undergraduate degree. By 1923, she had received her master’s degree in bacteriology from the University of Pennsylvania and was working in a lab. However, this job was not satisfying for Lindsley—she quit her job, bought a motorcycle, and rode cross-country back to her home in Yellowstone to pursue a career there.

== Career ==
In 1921, during her college years, Lindsley was first employed as a temporary ranger-naturalist in Yellowstone. In 1925, after receiving her graduate degree and returning to Yellowstone, she became the first permanent female park ranger in the country. Some individuals, including Chief Inspector J.F. Gartland of the Department of the Interior, voiced strong opposition to the appointment of women rangers, and Lindsley noted that she felt pressure to perform well despite criticisms of her suitability for the position of a ranger: "many still think that women's work should be inside and it is a problem sometimes to satisfy everyone even tho [sic] I may be qualified for the work in the field."

Regardless of these criticisms, Lindsley helped normalize women’s positions in the NPS—for example, because the NPS did not have an official ranger uniform for women, Lindsley designed her own. An adapted version of this uniform would be imitated by other women rangers and would eventually become standard. Lindsley worked alongside other pioneering women rangers and ranger-naturalists in Yellowstone, such as Irene Wisdom, Frieda Nelson, and Elizabeth Conard.

Lindsley performed a variety of jobs during her time as a ranger and a ranger-naturalist. Not only did she hold positions at information centers and museums at the park, but she also taught classes about the park, performed water testing, and published field notes in Yellowstone Nature Notes.

== Later life ==
In 1928, Lindsley married fellow ranger Ben Arnold and began working park part-time during the summer season and writing for Nature Notes in the winter. Their son was born in 1932.
