= Mount Diablo Unitarian Universalist Church =

Church in California, US

- Mount Diablo Unitarian Universalist Church
- Mount Diablo Unitarian Universalist Church
- 37.89968°N 122.04575°W
- Location: 55 Eckley Lane; Walnut Creek, CA
- Country: US
- Denomination: Unitarian Universalist
- Website: www.mduuc.org

History
- Former name: Mount Diablo Unitarian Church
- Founded: 1951

Architecture
- Functional status: Active
- Completed: 2000 (present Sanctuary)

Clergy
- Pastor: Rev Leslie Takahashi (Senior Minister)

Mount Diablo Unitarian Universalist Church (MDUUC) is a church in Walnut Creek, California. In 2016, it claimed a membership of 494. The church buildings occupy a 14-acre tract at 55 Eckley Lane in Walnut Creek.

== History ==
In 1951, a group of liberal religious families in Walnut Creek, California became a fellowship of the Unitarian Church. Glen Kent became the first president of the fellowship. When they outgrew meeting in members' homes, they rented a house on Pine Street (no longer in existence) as their meeting place. In 1959, this group organized the Mount Diablo Unitarian Church. It called the Rev. Aron Gilmartin from the University Unitarian Church in Seattle as the first minister. The church then rented space in the basement of the Highland Building in Walnut Creek for the minister's office and church school classes. The church adopted its present name in 1961, after the American Unitarian Association and the Universalist Church of America consolidated.

Aron Gilmartin resigned as minister in 1974. He was followed by Josiah Bartlett, former president of Starr King School for the Ministry, who served as Interim Minister for two years. Then, Til Evans was appointed Interim Minister. She served for several months, until she was hired by Starr King as full-time assistant professor of education. Her husband, Bob Forbes, was appointed Interim Minister of the church, until he died of cancer in 1984.

David Sammons, a 1965 graduate of Starr King, was called to serve as minister in 1984. He had received the Doctor of Divinity degree from Starr King in 1978. Dr. Sammons served until his retirement in 2007. He is now Minister Emeritus of the church. Diane Miller became Interim Minister for a two-year term. Meanwhile, a search committee formed by the congregation began the process of selecting a permanent replacement. The committee recommended, and the congregation approved, calling a married couple, David and Leslie Takahashi Morris, to serve as co-ministers. They began work in August 2008, with their formal installation ceremony held in February 2009.

David Morris resigned from the church's leadership in 2014, and Leslie Takahashi was formally installed as Lead Minister on February 21, 2016.

== Facilities ==
The current church sanctuary building was completed in 2000. It can accommodate 300 people.

Bortin Fellowship Hall, built in 2009, has a capacity of 335 persons, seated, or 551 standing.

In 2011, the congregation voted to install a solar energy system to provide enough electrical energy to serve most of the church's needs and to further its mission of being a "Green Sanctuary".

In 2014 Church members funded an orchard of 80 fruit trees, which were planted by The Urban Farmers (a local non-profit). The fruit will be harvested by The Urban Farmers and contributed to those in need.

== Social Action ==
The church has been notable for its social action. Examples:

- LGBT Marriage
- Immigration
- Affordable Housing
- Interfaith connections
