= Heartsfield =

American rock band

Heartsfield is an American rock band formed in 1970 by guitarists J.C. Hartsfield and Perry Jordan. The band's first album included, in addition to Heartsfield and Jordan, Phil Lucafo on electric guitar and pedal steel guitar; Artie Baldacci on drums, bass, congas and piano; Greg "Ziggy" Biela on bass; and Freddie Dobbs on electric guitar, banjo, and bottleneck guitar.

Heartsfield toured throughout the United States during the 1970s and early 1980s. They reunited in 1999, and have released twelve albums, with their latest released in 2010. The first single from that album, "Here I Am" was released concurrently and was written by Chicagoan Dan Myers, and a promotional tour was undertaken.

Having Billboard charted singles and albums, Heartsfield has sold millions of records and were among the first musicians with success in the Southern Rock/Country Rock genres. Their complex, intertwined lead guitar riffs are indicative of the music style they helped create as are their three and four part harmonies.

Their song, "Another Man Down" was included in the book.

Current members include Freddie Dobbs, Andon Davis, Dave Nelson, Scott Bonshire, and Steve Eddington.

Perry Jordan died on June 29, 2011, at age 62.

J.C. Hartsfield (born Jerry Carlile Hartsfield on March 4, 1943) died on July 17, 2014, from injuries he had suffered in a motorcycle accident two weeks earlier. He was 71.

Greg "Ziggy" Biela died on December 4, 2020, age 71.

Artie Baldacci died in his sleep (reportedly from a cardiac event) on September 30, 2024 at the age of 73.

== Discography ==
- Heartsfield (1973)
- The Wonder of It All (1974)
- Foolish Pleasures (1975)
- Collector's Item (1977)
- The Writer's Tapes, Vol. 1 (2000)
- Live in '75 (2000)
- Rescue the Dog (2001)
- All Over the Place (live) (2001)
- Rockin' the Country (2002)
- Georgia Flyer (2006)
- Disrupting the Country (2009)
- Here I Am (2010)
