= Humans (American band) =

- Origin: Santa Cruz, California
- Genres: New wave, post-punk
- Years active: 1976–1981
- Label: I.R.S.
- Past members: Sterling Storm; Eric Gies; John Anderson; Jerome Deupree; Jim Norris; David Larstein; Lee Stewart

Humans were a new wave band from Santa Cruz, formed in 1976 as The Mysterious People. They changed their name to Humans in 1979 and released a music video for their song "I Live in the City" directed by Videowest. Leader Sterling Storm's style was similar to that of Wall of Voodoo's Stan Ridgway, while bassist Eric Gies wrote mostly quirky ballads. They continued to play in the Bay Area into the late 1980s and also managed to make a long-form video to accompany their I.R.S. LP, Happy Hour, before breaking up. Storm has since become a successful production designer.

== Discography ==
- Play EP (1980)
- Happy Hour (1981)
