= Loverde =

Loverde is a surname. Notable people with the surname include:

- Dawn Brancheau née LoVerde (1969-2010), SeaWorld trainer killed by Tilikum in 2010.
- Frank Loverde (1947–1990), American singer and musician
- Paul Loverde (born 1940), American Roman Catholic bishop
- Vincent LoVerde (born 1989), American ice hockey player
