= United States Park Rangers =

Uniformed employees patrolling US Parks

Park rangers presiding over US Citizenship Ceremony

United States Park Rangers are federal officers affiliated with the United States Department of the Interior. Park Rangers patrol the more than 189 million acres of public lands managed by the Department of the Interior. They work for the department's subordinate bureaus, namely the Bureau of Land Management, the Bureau of Reclamation, the National Park Service, and the United States Fish and Wildlife Service.

== History ==
The term "ranger" is from a Middle English word dating back to 1350–1400. "Rangers" patrolled royal forests and parks to prevent "poachers" from hunting game claimed by the nobility. Use of the term "ranger" dates to the 17th century in the United States, and was drawn from the word "range" (to travel over a large area). The title "ranger" in the modern sense was first applied to a reorganization of the fire warden force in the Adirondack Park, after fires burned 80,000 acres (320 km^{2}) in the park. The name was taken from Rogers' Rangers, a small force famous for their woodcraft that fought in the area during the French and Indian War beginning in 1755. The term was then adopted by the National Park Service.

The first Director of the National Park Service, Stephen T. Mather, reflected upon the early park rangers in the US National Parks as follows:

They are a fine, earnest, intelligent, and public-spirited body of men, these rangers. Though small in number, their influence is large. Many and long are the duties heaped upon their shoulders. If a trail is to be blazed, it is "send a ranger." If an animal is floundering in the snow, a ranger is sent to pull him out; if a bear is in the hotel, if a fire threatens a forest, if someone is to be saved, it is "send a ranger." If a Dude wants to know the why, if a Sagebrusher is puzzled about a road, it is "ask the ranger." Everything the ranger knows, he will tell you, ex-cept about himself.

Horace Albright, second director of the National Park Service, called Harry Yount, gamekeeper of Yellowstone National Park, the "father of the ranger service, as well as the first national park ranger". Yount was hired in 1880 to enforce the prohibition on hunting in the park. In addition to these duties, he would act as a guide and escort for visiting officials, such as he did in 1880 for the Secretary of the Interior Carl Schurz. Although he was paid a yearly salary of $1,000 (out of the park's overall $15,000 yearly budget) he resigned at the end of 1881. Before leaving, he suggested to the superintendent of Yellowstone that "...the game and natural curiosities of the park be protected by officers stationed at different points of the park with authority to enforce observance of laws of the park maintenance and trails." Yount pointed out that it was nearly impossible for one person to protect the game properly over the park's vast expanse.

== Official classification ==
A 1956 book by C.B. Colby that describes training, equipment, and the responsibilities of park rangers.

The park ranger position in the federal government began as a series of specialized positions in the miscellaneous series. In 1959, the official park ranger position (GS-0025 Park Ranger) was established throughout the federal government. along with its companion series the park technician (GS-0026). The park ranger position was designated for "professional" work like management of the park (park ranger (manager)-park ranger (site manager)), or management of division (chief ranger, chief of interpretation). The park technician series was designed to handle routine technical skills, i.e., giving walks, talks, patrolling roads, fee collection.

After years of concern of pay, the National Park Service and the Office of Personnel Management agreed to consolidate the two series into a single group, to be used only for professional positions and temporary or seasonal positions. The agreement also required that the park service begin using other appropriate technical series for lower paid positions. The protection ranger series was changed to "GL"-0025 in 2005.

- 0025 – park ranger series – The duties are to supervise, manage, and perform work in the conservation and use of federal park resources. This involves functions such as park conservation; natural, historical, and cultural resource management; and the development and operation of interpretive and recreational programs for the benefit of the visiting public.
- 0303 – miscellaneous clerk and assistant series, aka visitor use assistances – Duties include clerical, assistant, or technician work when other series are not appropriate. The work requires a knowledge of procedures and techniques involved in handling special programs. This series is commonly used for fee collectors at campgrounds and entrance stations.
- 0189 – recreation aid and assistant series – Provides support to recreation programs by performing limited aspects of recreation work, lifeguards
- 0090 – guide series – Provides or supervises interpretive and guide services to visitors to sites of public interest. Give formal talks about natural and historic features, explains engineering structures and related water developments, answers questions, and guides tours.

== Duties, disciplines, and specializations ==
The duties of the modern park ranger are as varied and diverse as the parks where they serve, and in recent years have become more highly specialized – though they often intertwine. Regardless of the regular duties of any one discipline, the goal of all rangers remains to protect the park resources for future generations and to protect park visitors. This goal is accomplished by the professionalism and sometimes overlapping of the different functions and specialties. For example, an interpretive ranger may be trained in and perform fire suppression, emergency medicine, or search and rescue. Law enforcement rangers and other park employees may contribute to the mission of the interpretive ranger by orienting visitors to park resources and facilities, safely and effectively move through them, and make a personal connection to park resources while they appropriately utilize facilities. The spirit of teamwork in accomplishing the mission of stewardship is underscored by the fact that in many cases, the U.S. National Park Service in particular, park rangers share a common uniform regardless of work assignment.

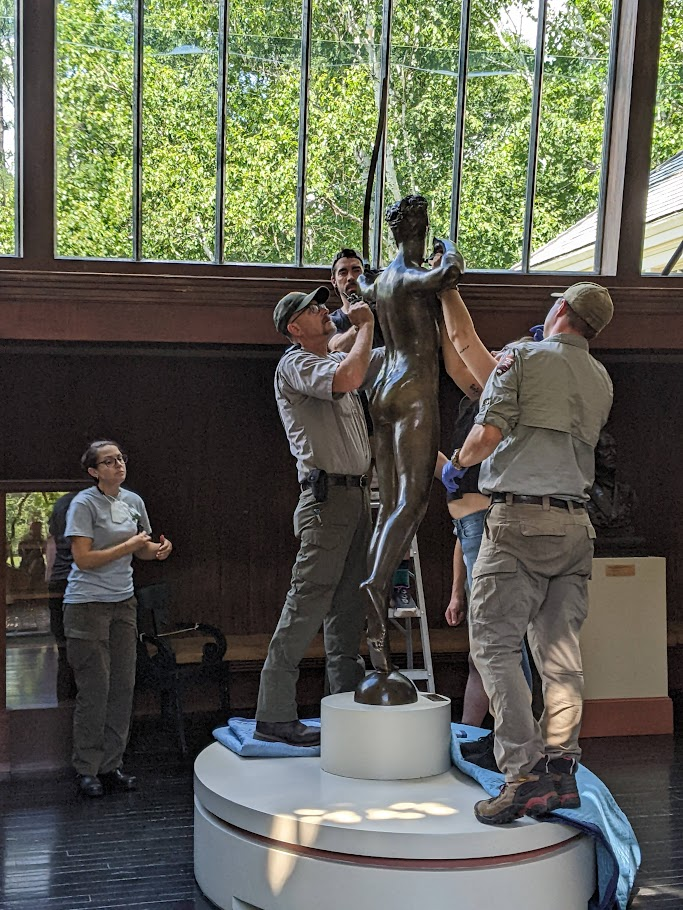
Rangers at the Saint-Gaudens National Historical Park reinstalling a replica of Diana to the artist's studio on the site in 2022.

The oldest source of information on park ranger careers was the 1956 Park Ranger by C. B. Colby. At that time, park rangers fulfilled all the demands of park operations from administrative duties to technical rescue. By 1995, Exploring Careers in the National Parks by Bob Gartner, reflected the specialization of duties and the expansion of titles covering the same work as was being done in 1956. In the 21st century, Live the Adventure, showed the park ranger profession was only becoming more complex.

The federal Office of Personnel Management sums up the diversity of the official park ranger series of professional white-collar occupational groups as follows:

This series covers positions the duties of which are to supervise, manage, and/or perform work in the conservation and use of Federal park resources. This involves functions such as park conservation; natural, historical, and cultural resource management; and the development and operation of interpretive and recreational programs for the benefit of the visiting public. Duties characteristically include assignments such as: forest and structural fire control; protection of property from natural or visitor related depredation; dissemination to visitors of general, historical, or scientific information; folk-art and craft demonstration; control of traffic and visitor use of facilities; enforcement of laws and regulations; investigation of violations, complaints, trespass/encroachment, and accidents; search and rescue missions; and management activities related to resources such as wildlife, lakeshores, seashores, forests, historic buildings, battlefields, archeological properties, and recreation areas.

=== Interpretation and education ===
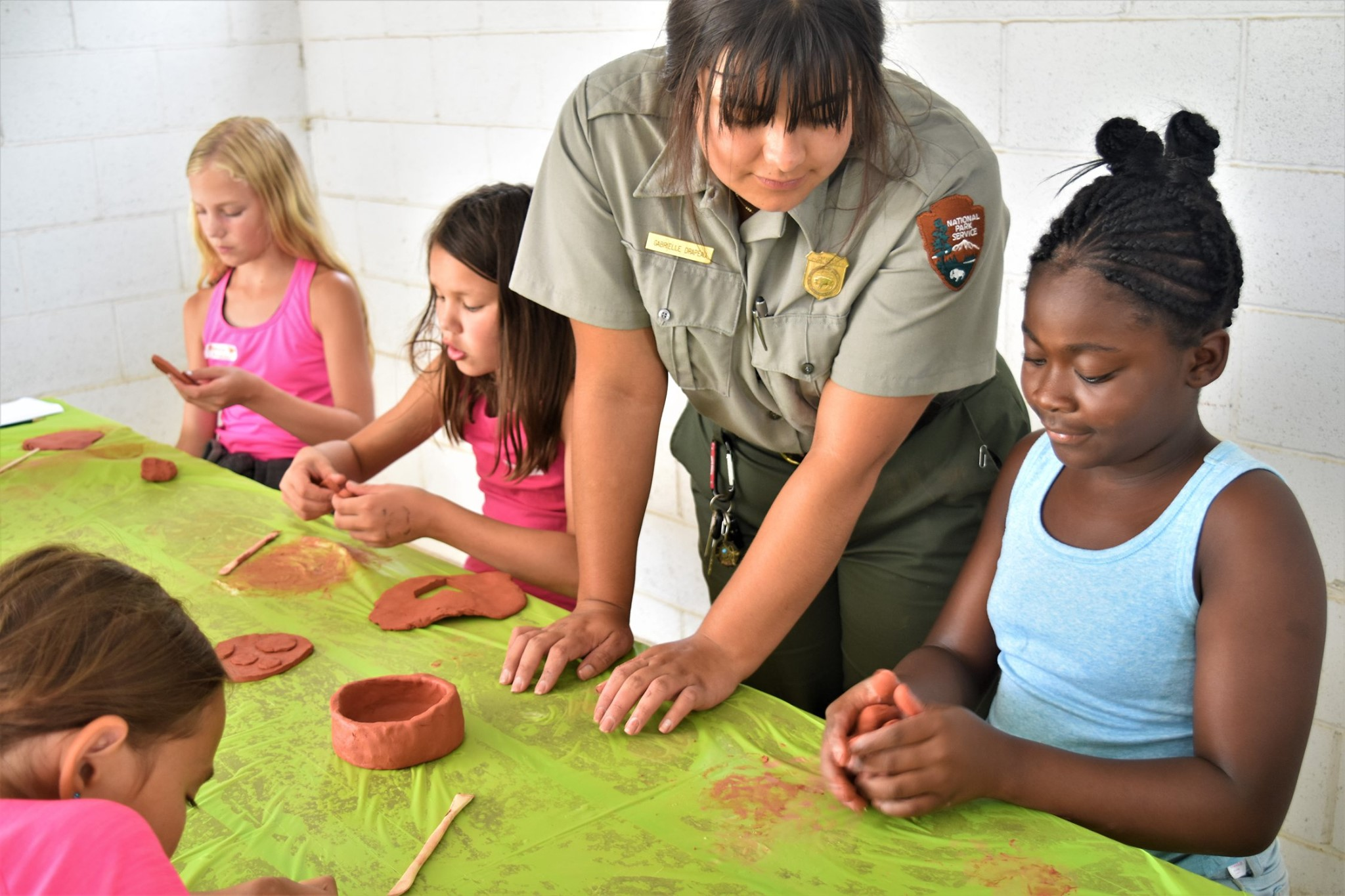
Park ranger at a 'Ranger for a Day' event

- Interpretation: park rangers provide a wide range of informational services to visitors. Some rangers provide practical information—such as driving directions, train timetables, weather forecasts, trip planning resources, and beyond. Rangers may provide interpretive programs to visitors intended to foster stewardship of the resources. Interpretation in this sense includes guided tours about the park's history, ecology or both; slideshows, talks, demonstrations; informal contacts, and historical re-enactments. Interpretive rangers apply the latest scholarship to continuously evaluate and plan interpretive programming and methods. Products include traditional printed materials and outdoor wayside exhibits, and now include web-based and digital applications. All uniformed rangers, regardless of their primary duties, are often expected to be experts on the resources in their care, whether they are natural or cultural.
- Education: rangers may also engage in leading more formalized curriculum-based educational programs, meant to support and complement instruction received by visiting students in traditional academic settings, or in creating resource-based curriculum materials for other educators to utilize. Rangers often develop education programs to help educators meet specific national and local standards of instruction. Cultural resource education may include access to artifacts or replicas, and natural resource education may include the taking of samples, all under the supervision of a ranger to insure proper protection of the resources. Unlike interpretation, education programs include the opportunity to assess learning and designed to meet external standards using the protected resources as the subject.

=== Law enforcement and emergency services ===
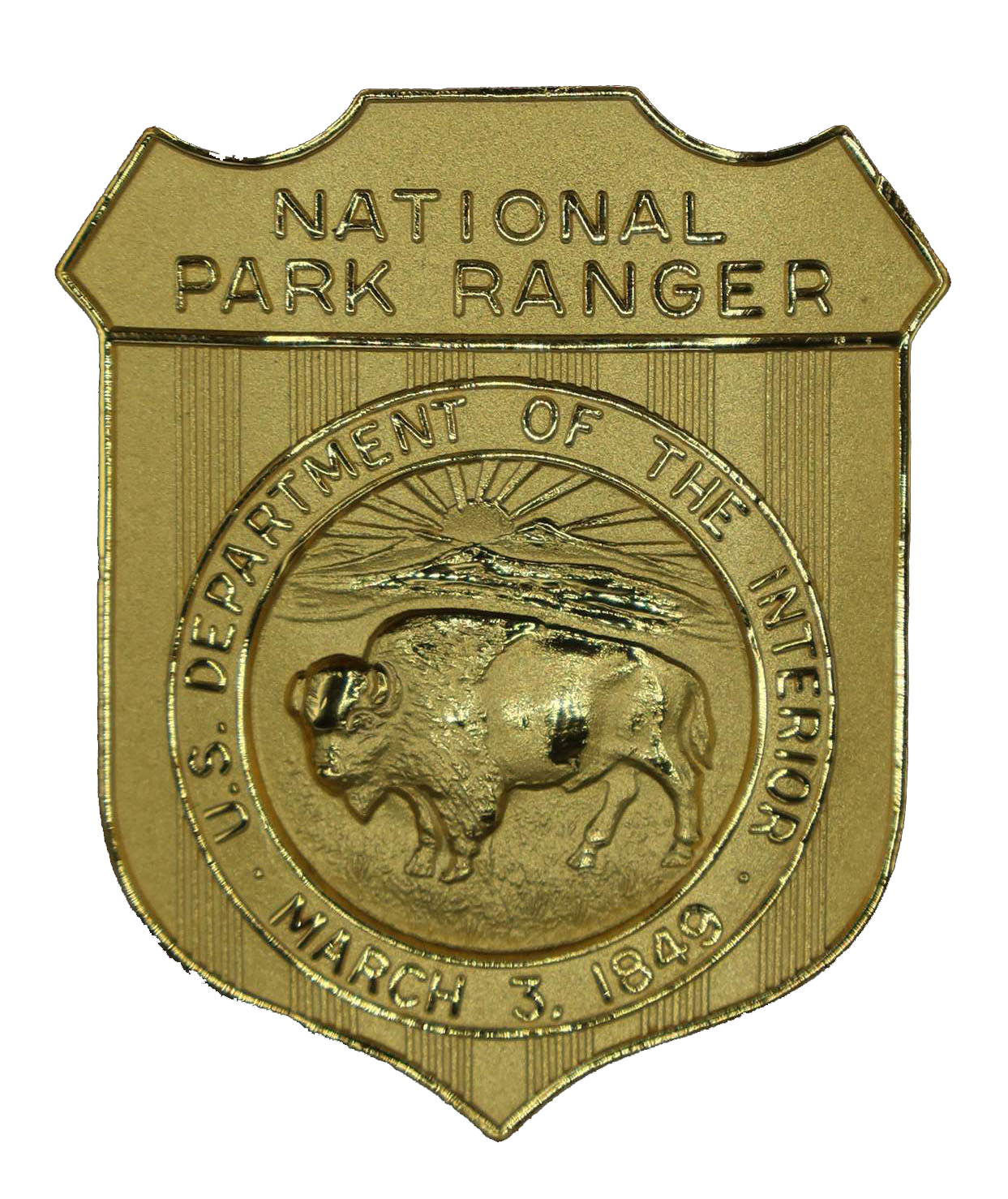
Non-law enforcement Ranger badge

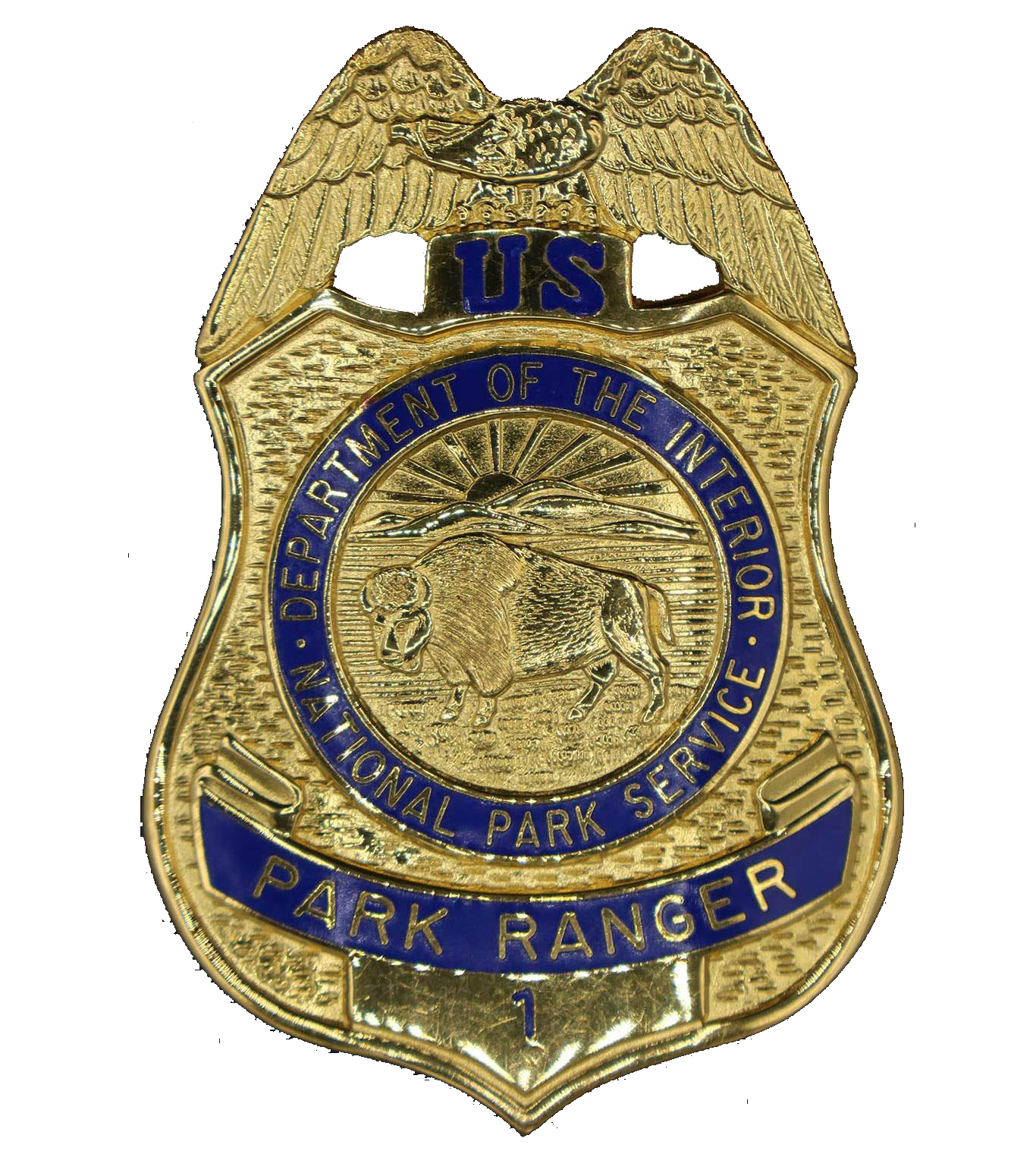
Law Enforcement Ranger badge

National Park Service Ranger badges

By the 1970s, the National Park Service recognized that in order to protect visitors and park resources effectively, the service needed professional rangers dedicated primarily to law enforcement, emergency medical services, firefighting, and search and rescue. Although some modern NPS rangers in this specialty ("protection rangers") may be primarily engaged in law enforcement duties, the many varied environments they work in may require these employees to be competent in a variety of public safety skills. Rangers who have received a law enforcement commission wear the standard NPS uniform with the Department of the Interior law enforcement badge. In larger park units search and rescue, emergency medicine, and other functions may be a branch of the "visitor services" or "protection" division and may not require a commission.

== Education and training ==
The United States Office of Personnel Management provides the following guidance concerning education requirements for all park rangers:

Undergraduate and Graduate Education: Major study -- natural resource management, natural sciences, history, archeology, anthropology, park and recreation management, law enforcement/police science, social sciences, museum sciences, business administration, public administration, behavioral sciences, sociology, or other closely related subjects pertinent to the management and protection of natural and cultural resources. Course work in fields other than those specified may be accepted if it clearly provides applicants with the background of knowledge and skills necessary for successful job performance in the position to be filled.

Specialized experience may be substituted for education in some cases.

=== Specialized education and training ===
In addition to traditional undergraduate and graduate coursework, the following specialized study pertain to the park ranger profession:

==== Interpretation ====
In the last decades of the 20th century the field of resource interpretation began to consciously professionalize itself. This has resulted in the early 21st century with colleges and universities offering coursework and degrees in interpretation.

== See also ==
- List of United States federal law enforcement agencies
- Ranger of Windsor Great Park
- Epping Forest Keepers
- Women in the National Park Service
