= Moses Tyson Jr. =

American songwriter

- Born: Moses James Tyson Jr. May 21, 1961 (age 65); Vallejo, California
- Origin: Memphis, Tennessee
- Genres: Gospel, traditional black gospel, urban contemporary gospel
- Occupations: Singer, songwriter, guitarist, organist
- Instruments: Vocals, singer-songwriter, guitar, organ
- Years active: 1973–present
- Labels: Curb, Alpine, WCG Entertainment, TY-Mo, World Class, Central South,
- Website: facebook.com/officialmosestysonjr

Moses James Tyson Jr. (born May 21, 1961) is an American gospel musician and organist. He started his music career, in 1973, with learning how to play the guitar by ear to be used on a Sly Stone album, who is his cousin. His first album, I Made up My Mind, came out in 1992 with Curb Records, yet this did not chart. The second album, Music, released in 1999 by Alpine Records, and this placed on two Billboard magazine charts. His next album to chart, Music Remastered & Sacred Organ Music, was released in 2010 with World Class Gospel Records, and this charted upon the Billboard magazine Gospel Albums chart. He would go on tours playing the guitar and organ for the likes of Billy Preston, Timothy Wright.

== Early life ==
Tyson was born on May 21, 1961, in Vallejo, California, as Moses James Tyson Jr., the son of Reverend Moses Tyson Sr. and his mother, who was a pianist at his church. This gave Tyson the impetus to learn how to play the organ and become an organist during his late childhood and early teenage years. He would learn how to play the guitar at the urging of his cousin Sly Stone, so that he could be used on his albums, at the age of 12.

== Music career ==
His music recording career began in 1992, with the release of I Made up My Mind by Curb Records, yet this failed to chart. His next album, Music, would be released by Alpine Records on November 30, 1999, and this placed upon two Billboard magazine Gospel Albums at No. 12 and No. 42 on the Independent Albums. The following album to chart, Music Remastered & Sacred Organ Music, was released by World Class Gospel Records in 2010, and it charted on the Gospel Albums at No. 28. Tyson went on tours with the likes of Billy Preston and Timothy Wright during the 1980s and early-1990s.

== Personal life ==
Tyson resides in Vallejo, California.

== Discography ==
List of selected studio albums, with selected chart positions
Title	Album details	Peak chart positions	
Title	Album details	US Gos	US Ind
Music	Released: November 30, 1999; Label: Alpine; CD, digital download	12	42
Music Remastered & Sacred Organ Music	Released: 2010; Label: World Class; CD, digital download	28	–
