= Marianne Nicolson =

Canadian artist (born 1969)

- Born: 1969 (age 56–57); Comox, British Columbia
- Known for: artist

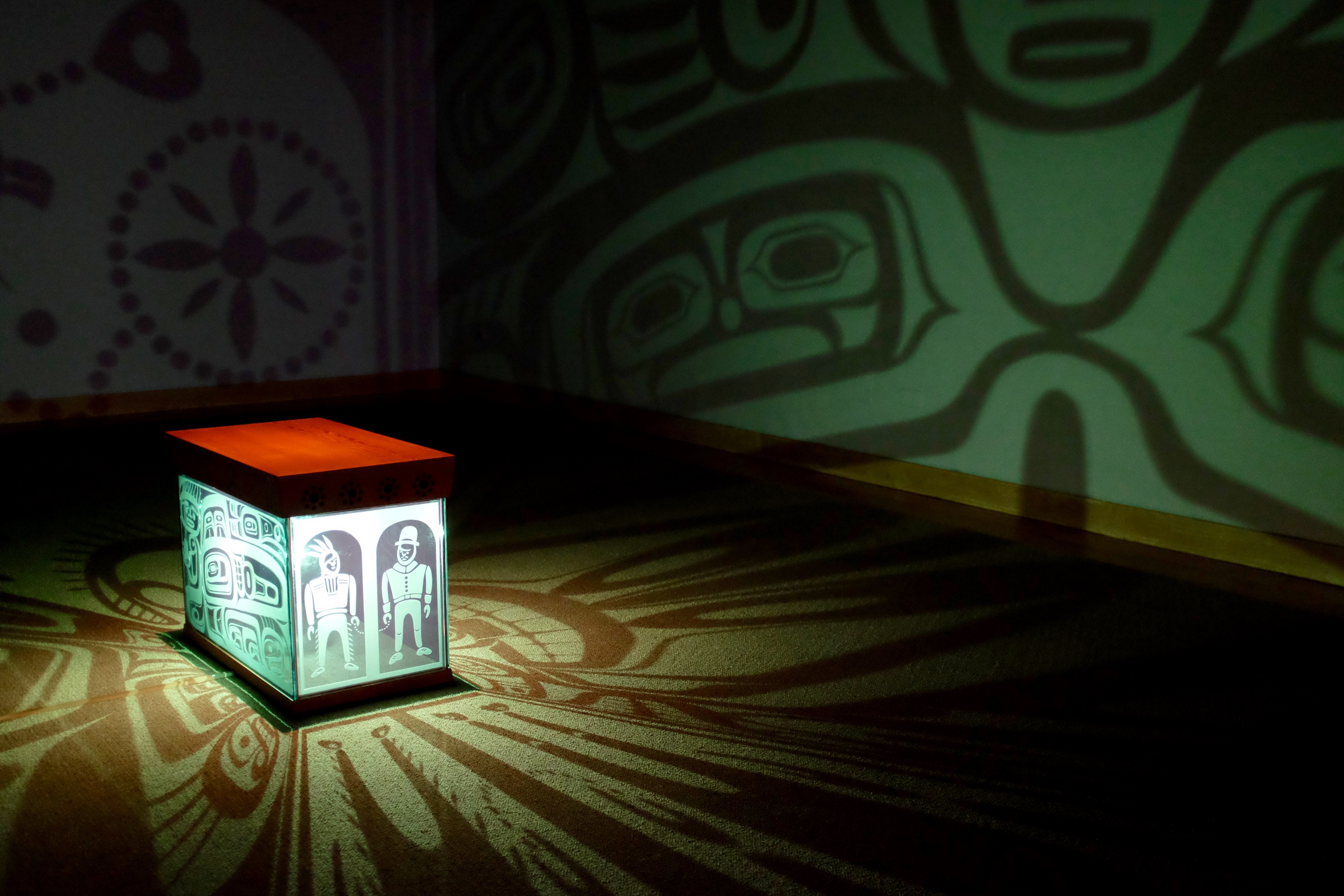
Nicolson's The Harbinger of Catastrophe (2017).

Marianne Nicolson (‘Tayagila’ogwa; born 1969) is a Dzawada’enuxw visual artist whose work explores the margins at which public access to First Nations artifacts clashes with the preservation of indigenous cultural knowledge. She utilizes painting, photography, mixed-media, sculpture, and installation to create modern depictions of traditional Kwakwaka’wakw beliefs, and has exhibited in Canada and throughout the world since 1992.

== Personal life ==
Marianne Nicolson was born in 1969, in Comox, British Columbia to a Kwakwaka'wakw First Nations mother of the Dzawada'enuxw descent, and a Scottish immigrant father from Stornoway. She decided to become an artist when she was five years old. She was trained by a master carver in traditional Kwakwaka’wakw design in the early 1990s.

Nicolson is an outspoken advocate for Indigenous land rights, and integrates this in her artwork. Nicolson is involved in her community, both as a Nunwakola Cultural Society board member and through artistic projects. One community project in 2019 gathered over 55 participants, young and old, connected to the Musgamakw Dzawada’enuxw (part of the Kwakwaka’wakw First Nations). As part of a fish farming protest, Nicolson and the participants created a pictograph series. These pictographs were not only community building but they also played off her cliff painting from 1998.

She currently lives in the Kwakwaka’wakw community of Kingcome Inlet, BC (Dzawada’enuxw people), after moving there in the 1990s.

== Education ==
In 1996, Nicolson graduated with a Bachelor of Fine Arts from the Emily Carr Institute of Art and Design. She continued her education at the University of Victoria (UVIC) in 1999, receiving her Master of Fine Arts. In 2005, after returning to UVIC, she graduated with a Masters in Linguistics and Anthropology. Later on, she received her PhD in Anthropology and Art History, also from UVIC.

She also studied the Kwak’wala language and directed research investigating the link between indigenous language and indigenous worldview.

== Awards ==
- Emily Award- In 2019 Nicolson received Emily Carr University's Emily Award, which honours outstanding achievements by university alumni.
- Fulmer Award of Distinction- She also received the Fulmer Award of Distinction in 2019. An award that recognizes individuals who have made a profound contribution to their First Nations culture.

== Artistic career ==
Her practice is multi-disciplinary encompassing photography, painting, carving, video, installation, monumental public art, writing and speaking. All her work is political in nature and seeks to uphold Kwakwaka’wakw traditional philosophy and worldview through contemporary mediums and technology.

Marianne Nicolson has exhibited in many countries. Such galleries and exhibitions include the 17th Biennale of Sydney, The Vancouver Art Gallery, The National Museum of the American Indian, Nuit Blanche in Toronto, Museum Arnhem and many others. Major monumental public artworks are situated in Vancouver International Airport, the Canadian Embassy in Amman, Jordan and the Canadian Embassy in Paris, France.

=== Cliff Painting ===
Marianne Nicolson's artistic career was established after the completion of her Cliff Painting in her traditional homeland of Kingcome Inlet in 1998. The pictograph, which covers a surface of 28 by 38 foot on 120 foot cliff makes reference to the history of the Dzawada‘enuxw tribe of the Kwakwaka’wakw First Nations. It is the first mural to be completed in sixty years, celebrating the strength of her community of Gwa’yi. A copper design represents wealth, and the Kawadilikala, the Dzawada'enuxw ancestor is also depicted while carrying a treasure box with the sun on it.

== Major exhibitions ==
=== Bax'wana'tsi - The Container for Souls ===
This installation was held at Artspeak, in Vancouver, BC from January 7 to February 11, 2006, and later held from October 19 to November 18, 2006, at Gallery 101, in Ottawa, ON. Nicolson's piece, a light box that casts shadows on the surrounding walls of a raven, owl and two girls — the artist's aunt and mother as young women, took up the entire gallery. Viewers become part of the work and part of the history it tells. The box holds the possibility for purification and healing for a landscape ravaged by the visitor, carrying the memories of Aboriginal life and community.

=== The House of the Ghosts ===
Nicolson transformed the Vancouver Art Gallery into a Northwest Coast Ceremonial House for the exhibition. This site-specific projection ran from October 4 to January 11, 2009. The gallery used to be a former Provincial courthouse, through this piece Nicolson gives hope to the survival of Pacific Northwest Coast First Nations cultures and communities, despite active efforts to suppress and eradicate them.

=== Walking on Water (Thin Ice) ===
Exhibited at Equinox Gallery from April 6 to May 4, 2013, Nicolson's sculptural installation Walking on Water (Thin Ice) features a myriad of blue glass sculptures inserted into wooden supports. These glass shapes take the form of killer whale fins which, in Kwakwaka’wakw tradition, signify healing. Other Northwest Coast symbols are featured, such as owls, which carry the spirits of the deceased according to Kwakwaka’wakw principles, and also are becoming extinct as a result of habitat loss. The installation addresses issues of global warming through responding to a devastating flood that occurred in Kingcome Inlet. The title Walking on Water (Thin Ice) touches on this, inferring collective social denial and the repercussions they will inevitably face.

=== A Precarious State ===
This major installation consisted of a 6'x35' lit blue glass wall, which bears the carved image of a sinking killer whale being ridden by figures. The whale looks strained and it is not clear whether the figures are the source of the whale drowning or if they are drowning with the whale. This installation was commissioned by the Canadian Embassy in Amman, Jordan, in 2013

=== Foolmakers in the Setting Sun (Ni’nułamgila le’e Banistida `Tłisala) ===
Foolmakers in the Setting Sun (Ni’nułamgila le’e Banistida`Tłisala), exhibited in 2014 at Gallery 2 in Grand Forks, British Columbia, depicts the dan`tsikw (powerboards) that serve as spiritual powers during the 'tukwid, a traditional Kwakwaka’wakw ritual. Illustrations of a ghost and two nułamgila (foolmakers) are carved onto the three glass boards. Light is sent off onto the boards, simulating the sunset, producing shadows of the carved ghosts, which grow taller until they pass through an image of the Alberta Tar Sands on the wall at dusk. Foolmakers in the Setting Sun addresses how global warming and environmental contamination as a result of the pipeline project would destroy the planet, through the Kwakwaka’wakw worldview

=== The Rivers Monument ===
Her art piece titled The Rivers Monument has been installed at the A-B Connector at Vancouver International Airport, since January 2015. The Rivers Monument consists of two 8.5 m-tall blue glass poles, similar to totem poles on the Northwest Coast, enclosed by a water feature and an oval wooden bench at the base. Displaying indigenous designs inside the glass, the two poles represent the Columbia River and the Fraser River, revealing their respective histories concerning how European colonizers’ construction of dams greatly reduced the salmon population and obliterated thousands of indigenous pictographs. Marianne Nicolson has expressed optimism about the YVR for selecting her "very political" artwork for the connector, "[pushing] their own boundaries slightly" and raising awareness about indigenous peoples and their histories.

=== AWI'NAGWISKASU: Real Land ===
April 21 - July 2, 2017, The exhibit was curated by Jesse Birch and Liz Park and featured the artists' scope via paintings, installations and video. The works therein represented concerns/fears about the surrounding waters of the community.

=== Tunics of the Changing Tide: ===
In her 2007 painting Tunics of the Changing Tide, exhibited at the Morris and Helen Belkin Art Gallery in 2017, Nicolson has illustrated two garments bearing the figures of a Thunderbird, a mink, a snake, and a tree. Outlines of ravens, wolves, and people are painted in the background, and objects such as coppers and coins, representing wealth and status, are attached on the surface. As its title implies, Nicolson's painting draws attention to the experiences of the Kwikwasut’inuxw and Dzawada̱’enux̱w in terms of their economic growth and decline due to colonization, and makes reference to the swing from the flourishing economy of the 1880s to the downfall of the Northwest Coast nations in the 1920s due to potlatch ban legislation. A 1929 coin on the Thunderbird denotes the revival of cultural traditions amongst the Kwakwa̱ka̱’wakw, and their resistance against assimilation.

=== To refuse, to wait, to sleep ===
The exhibition To refuse, to wait, to sleep was held at the Morris and Helen Belkin Art Gallery in 2017. Nicolson's piece "The Sun is Setting on the British Empire" was commissioned for the exhibition. She reworks the British Columbia provincial flag by repositioning and inverting the Union Jack below a setting/rising sun that has been recreated in the Kwakwaka’wakw style. Nicolson references the flag's original orientation (1895-1906); while the early version shows the sun atop the Union Jack and suggests a cooperative situation and mutually beneficial alliances between the crown and Indigenous nations, these emblems were reversed in 1906 and symbolically reveal a relationship of oppression, theft and genocide. By righting the symbols of the flag back to their original relationship, Nicolson's banner instills hope for and assertion of Indigenous rights over the land, which today remain largely unresolved. It was installed on the exterior of the Belkin and remains there as an outdoor art piece.

=== Waterline ===
Nicolson's work Waterline, exhibited in 2018 at the Birmingham Museum of Art, gives focus to sacred and life-sustaining waterways. The form of the sculpture is derived from traditional bentwood boxes. The images that are presented as the light moves up and down, mimicking the tidal flow of waters, show animals and symbols important to Nicolson's Kwakwaka’wakw heritage. The installation references ancient Kwakwaka’wakw cliff pictographs that are in danger of being lost because of industrial structures now control the rise and fall of river-water levels and indigenous sites, causing ancient Kwakwaka’wakw pictographs on cliffs and river rocks to disappear under rising water, and then reemerge.

=== Hexsa'am: To Be Here Always ===
Exhibited at the Morris and Helen Belkin Art Gallery in 2019, Hexsa'am: To Be Here Always aims to foreground Dzawada'enuxw First Nation's lawsuit to extend Indigenous land title to waters in order to fight Marine Harvest Canada and Cermaq Canada fish farms in the Broughton Archipelago near Kingcome Inlet. The lawsuit and exhibition raises issues about Indigenous jurisdiction, land and water "in a way that journalism or political protest in the streets do not".

== Exhibits ==
- Hearts of Our People: Native Women Artists, (2019), Minneapolis Institute of Art, Minneapolis, Minnesota, United States.
