= Ahta =

Ahta may refer to:

- Ahta Indian Reserve No. 3, on the Coast of British Columbia, Canada
- The Ahta River, at the mouth of which is the aforesaid Indian reserve, at the head of Bond Sound
- The Ahta Valley, the valley of that river
- AHTA, the American Horticultural Therapy Association
- A.H.T.A., the Anti-Horse Thief Association

== See also ==
- Ahtna
- Hata (disambiguation)
- Hada (disambiguation)
