= Simoom Sound =

Sound in British Columbia, Canada

Coordinates: 50°51′00″N 126°30′00″W

Simoom Sound is a sound on the Central Coast of British Columbia, Canada, located on the east and north sides of the Wishart Peninsula between Tribune Channel and Kingcome Inlet. The former steamer landing, now classified as a "locality", and the post office of Simoom Sound, British Columbia, located in Echo Bay on Gilford Island, is named after the sound. Kawages Indian Reserve No. 4 is located on the north side of Simoom Sound and is a reserve of the Dzawada'enuxw First Nation of the Kwakwaka'wakw peoples.

== Name origin ==
The sound is named for HMS Simoom, 8 guns, Royal Navy troopship commanded by Captain John Kingcome, namesake of Kingcome Inlet and Rear Admiral of the Pacific Station 1863-1864 when the sound was named.

== History ==
Captain George Vancouver anchored in Simoom Sound in his vessels the Discovery and Chatham from 29 July to 5 August 1792, while the neighbourhood was examined by rowboats.
