= Hata =

Hata may refer to:

== Places ==
- Hata, Nagano, a former town in Nagano Prefecture, Japan
- Hata District, Kōchi, a district in Kōchi Prefecture, Japan
- Hata, India, a town and municipal council in Uttar Pradesh, India
- Hata (Assembly constituency), a constituency of the Uttar Pradesh Legislative Assembly
- Hata, a former village that is now the site of Ahta Indian Reserve No. 3
- Hata, Purvi Singhbhum, a village in Jharkhand, India

== Other uses ==
- Hata (surname), a Japanese surname
- Hata clan, a former immigrant clan to Japan

== See also ==
- Hata Station (disambiguation), multiple railway stations in Japan
- Hatamoto
