= Thy Kingdom Come =

Thy Kingdom Come may refer to:

- "Thy kingdom come", a phrase in the Lord's Prayer in the Bible
- Thy Kingdom Come (CeCe Winans album), 2008
- Thy Kingdom Come (Seyi Vibez album), 2023
- Thy Kingdom Come (film), a 2018 short film
- Thy Kingdom Come (King T album), an album by King T slated for release in 1998 that was commercially released in 2002 with the name The Kingdom Come
- "Thy Kingdom Come" (Kingdom Hospital), a 2004 episode of the TV show Kingdom Hospital
- "Thy Kingdom Come" (Morbid Angel song), 1991
- Thy Kingdom Come (Russell book), an 1891 volume of Millennial Dawn (later retitled Studies in the Scriptures) written by Charles Taze Russell
- Thy Kingdom Come (short story collection), a short story collection by Simon Morden
- Thy Kingdom Come (Transformation Worship album), 2024
- Thy Kingdom Come (Suicideboys album), 2025
- Thy Kingdom Come (Seventh Day Slumber album), 2026

== See also ==
- Kingdom Come (disambiguation)
- "Thy Kingdom Come MMXIV", a 2014 song by Manowar
- Til Kingdom Come (disambiguation)
- To Kingdom Come (disambiguation)
