= The Lord of Steel =

- Cover art by Ken Kelly

Studio album by Manowar
- Released: June 16, 2012
- Genres: Heavy metal, power metal
- Length: 47:40 (Hammer/Steel edition); 55:19 (retail edition)
- Label: Magic Circle Music
- Producer: Joey DeMaio

Manowar chronology
Battle Hymns MMXI (2010)	The Lord of Steel (2012)	The Lord of Steel Live (2013)

Limited Hammer edition cover

Professional ratings
Review scores
Source	Rating
AllMusic	3.5/5 stars
Metal Hammer	4/7

The Lord of Steel is the eleventh studio album of the American heavy metal band Manowar. It was first released as a download on June 16, 2012, and the limited-edition pre-release special edition CD of the British heavy metal magazine Metal Hammer on June 26, 2012. The retail edition of the album was available as CD, limited-edition vinyl and digital album. It featured cover art by Ken Kelly who has worked on many previous Manowar covers. It marks a change in the band's sound, moving away from the symphonic sound of Gods of War and going back to the style of Louder than Hell with the production quality of Thunder in the Sky.

The song "El Gringo" was used in the credits of the 2011 film of the same name.

== Track listing ==
All lyrics are written by Joey DeMaio unless stated; all music is composed by DeMaio unless stated.

Hammer/Steel edition (limited)
No.	Title	Length
1.	"The Lord of Steel" (DeMaio, Karl Logan)	4:07
2.	"Manowarriors"	4:46
3.	"Born in a Grave" (DeMaio, Logan)	5:47
4.	"Righteous Glory" (DeMaio, Logan)	6:10
5.	"Touch the Sky"	3:49
6.	"Black List"	6:58
7.	"Expendable"	3:10
8.	"El Gringo"	4:57
9.	"Annihilation"	4:00
10.	"Hail, Kill and Die"	3:56
Total length:		47:40

- The Hammer Edition is the CD version that came in the Metal Hammer's 100% Official Steel Edition bundle (including this CD, the HolyHell's Darkness Visible (The Warning) EP and the magazine Metal Hammer #233) exclusively from Metal Hammer UK. Also available as digital download released on Manowar webshop. It includes a 16-page digital booklet featuring complete lyrics and brand new band photos.

Retail edition
No.	Title	Length
1.	"The Lord of Steel" (DeMaio, Karl Logan)	4:07
2.	"Manowarriors"	4:32
3.	"Born in a Grave" (DeMaio, Logan)	5:02
4.	"Righteous Glory" (DeMaio, Logan)	5:47
5.	"Touch the Sky"	3:48
6.	"Black List"	6:44
7.	"Expendable"	3:11
8.	"El Gringo"	6:55
9.	"Annihilation"	3:57
10.	"Hail Kill and Die"	3:57
11.	"The Kingdom of Steel" (DeMaio, Logan)	7:20
Total length:		55:19

- The retail edition, originally scheduled for September 28, hit the stores on October 19, 2012, on CD, limited-edition picture vinyl, and as digital album. It features a 24-page booklet, an opulent new illustration by fantasy artist Ken Kelly, a new song titled The Kingdom of Steel, entirely different mixes and many new arrangements compared to the limited pre-release.

== Personnel ==
Manowar

- Eric Adams – vocals
- Karl Logan – guitars, keyboards
- Joey DeMaio – 4 string, 8 string bass, piccolo bass, keyboards
- Donnie Hamzik – drums, percussion

Guest/session musicians

- Joe Rozler – keyboards
- Francisco Palomo – keyboards on El Gringo

Technical stuff

- Joey DeMaio – engineering, recording, editing, production
- Ronald Prent – mixing (at Wisseloord Studios)
- Darcy Proper – mastering (at Wisseloord Studios)
- Dirk Kloiber – additional engineering and editing (at Haus Wahnfried)
- Francisco Palomo – additional editing

== Charts ==
Chart (2012)	Peak position
Austrian Albums (Ö3 Austria)	37
Belgian Albums (Ultratop Wallonia)	191
Finnish Albums (Suomen virallinen lista)	20
German Albums (Offizielle Top 100)	19
Norwegian Albums (VG-lista)	40
Swedish Albums (Sverigetopplistan)	41
