= List of Kwakwakaʼwakw villages =

This is a list of Kwakwakaʼwakw villages.

- adapʼe, on Turnour Island
- Ahta, Hata, or Hada, Ahta IR No. 3, on Bond Sound
- Apsigiyu, on the northwest side of Gilford Island at the head of Shoal Harbour
- Coal Harbour, Quatsino Sound
- Gwayasdums, on Gilford Island
- Hegams (Hopetown)
- igisbalis, on the headland at Hoeya Sound, Knight Inlet
- Kalugwis, on Turnour Island
- Kamla, on Kumlah Island and Trafford Point on the east side of Gilford Island
- Kʼomoks, In Comox
- Gwaʼyi, a.k.a. Okwunalis or Kingcome, 2 miles up the Kingcome from its mouth
- Kingcome Inlet (Kwakʼwala name unknown)
- Klaywatse, on an island in the mouth of the Adam River (Vancouver Island)
- Kliquit, on the north shore of Knight Inlet
- Matilpi
- Memkumlis, on Village Island
- Metap, on Gilford Island
- Nalakglala, at the head of Hoeya Sound, Knight Inlet
- Paas or Baʼas (Blunden Harbour)
- ʦax̱is (Fort Rupert)
- Tzatsisnukomi (New Vancouver)
- Wakhanaq, on the north side of Gilford Island
- Waluk, on the south shore of the head of Kingcome Inlet
- xudzedzalis (on Port Neville)
- Whulk or xwalkw, also known as Cheslakees, at the mouth of the Nimpkish River
- Yalis (Alert Bay IR No. 1)
- Zalidis, near Glendale Cove

== See also ==
- List of Indian reserves in British Columbia
- List of Nuxalk villages
- List of Haida villages
