= Kingdom Come =

Kingdom Come may refer to:

- "Kingdom come", a phrase in the Lord's Prayer in the Bible

== Film ==
- Kingdom Come (1919 film), a Western short featuring Hoot Gibson
- Kingdom Come (2001 film), a comedy starring LL Cool J
- Kingdom Come, a cancelled film to have been directed by Dean Wright
- Kingdom Come, a 1990 television play by Paul Cornell
- Kingdom Come, a 1993 film starring Sean Patrick Flanery
- Kingdom Come, a 1999 film featuring David Zayas
- Kingdom Come, a screenplay by Paul Schrader and one of the working titles of the 1977 film Close Encounters of the Third Kind

== Literature ==
- Kingdom Come (Ballard novel), a 2006 novel by J. G. Ballard
- Kingdom Come (Bragg novel), a 1980 novel by Melvyn Bragg
- Kingdom Come (comics), a 1996 DC Comics miniseries
- Kingdom Come (LaHaye novel), a 2007 Left Behind novel by Tim LaHaye and Jerry B. Jenkins
- Kingdom Come, a 2006 novel by Tim Green
- Kingdom Come, a 2000 novel by Jim Hougan

== Music ==
=== Artists ===
- Kingdom Come (German band), an American/German hard rock band
- Kingdom Come (British band), a 1970s rock band formed by Arthur Brown, with an eponymous 1972 album

=== Albums ===
- Kingdom Come (Bryan & Katie Torwalt album), 2013
- Kingdom Come (Elevation Worship album) or the title song, 2010
- Kingdom Come (Jay-Z album) or the title song, 2006
- Kingdom Come (Kingdom Come album), by the American/German band, 1988
- Kingdom Come (Rebecca St. James album) or the title song (see below), 2022
- Kingdom Come (Sir Lord Baltimore album) or the title song, 1970
- The Kingdom Come, by King T, 2002

=== Songs ===
- "Kingdom Come" (Anna Bergendahl song), 2020
- "Kingdom Come" (Rebecca St. James song), 2021
- "Kingdom Come", by the Civil Wars from The Hunger Games: Songs from District 12 and Beyond, 2012
- "Kingdom Come", by Demi Lovato from Confident, 2015
- "Kingdom Come", by Dire Straits from On Every Street, 1991
- "Kingdom Come", by Godflesh from Songs of Love and Hate, 1996
- "Kingdom Come", by Heavenly from Dust to Dust, 2004
- "Kingdom Come", by Manowar from Kings of Metal, 1988
- "Kingdom Come", by the Mission from Children, 1988
- "Kingdom Come", by Red Velvet from Perfect Velvet, 2017
- "Kingdom Come", by Sabaton, 2021
- "Kingdom Come", by Tom Verlaine from Tom Verlaine, 1979
- "Kingdom Come", by Warkings from Armageddon, 2025
- "Kingdom Come", by World Party from Bang!, 1993
- "Kingdom Come", a section of Blues, Rags and Stomps, a 1970-1973 composition by Robert Boury

== Television episodes ==
- "Kingdom Come" (Big Love)
- "Kingdom Come" (Ninjago: Masters of Spinjitzu)
- "Kingdom Come" (Millennium)
- "Kingdom Come" (The Penguins of Madagascar)

== Other uses ==
- Kingdom Come, Kentucky
  - Kingdom Come State Park
- Kingdom Come (series), a video game franchise
  - Kingdom Come: Deliverance, a 2018 game and the first game of the franchise
  - Kingdom Come: Deliverance II, a 2025 game and the second entry in the series
- Heresy: Kingdom Come, a collectible card game

== See also ==
- Kingcome (disambiguation)
- "Kingdom Coming", an American Civil War song by Henry Clay Work
- Kingdom Coming: The Rise of Christian Nationalism, a 2006 book by Michelle Goldberg
- "Kingdom of Come", a song by Soundgarden from the EP Fopp
- Thy Kingdom Come (disambiguation)
- "Kingdom Comes", a song by Sara Groves from the album Add to the Beauty
- 'Til Kingdom Come (disambiguation)
- To Kingdom Come (disambiguation)
