= Stephens (disambiguation) =

Stephens is a surname.

Stephens may also refer to:

== Places ==
=== Canada ===
- Mount Stephens (British Columbia)
- Stephens Island (British Columbia), and Mount Stephens
- Stephens Island (Nunavut)

=== United States ===
- Stephens, Arkansas
- Stephens, Georgia
- Stephens, Kentucky
- Stephens, Missouri
- Stephens City, Virginia
- Stephens County, Georgia
- Stephens County, Oklahoma
- Stephens County, Texas
- Prospect Peak (Park County, Wyoming), also called Mount Stephens
- Stephens Creek (Oregon), United States
- Stephens Passage, a channel in the Alexander Archipelago in southeastern Alaska
- Stephens State Park, New Jersey
- A. H. Stephens State Park, Georgia

=== Elsewhere ===
- Mount Stephens (Antarctica)
- Stephens Creek (New South Wales), Australia
- Stephens Island (Great Barrier Reef), Queensland, Australia
- Stephens Island (New Zealand)

== People with the given name ==
- Stephens Lyne-Stephens (1801–1860), English politician
- Stephens Orr (1907–1990), Scottish photographer

== Businesses ==
- Stephens Inc., an American investment bank
- Stephens Media (newspapers), an American diversified media investment company
- Stephens Media Group (broadcasting), an American radio broadcaster that owns 75 radio stations

== Schools ==
- Stephens College, Columbia, Missouri, U.S.
- Stephens High School, Stephens, Arkansas, U.S.

== See also ==
- Stevens (disambiguation)
- Stephen (disambiguation)
- Port Stephens (disambiguation)
- Stephens v. Cady, an 1853 United States Supreme Court case
- R. v. Dudley and Stephens, a court case
