= Waluk =

Coordinates: 50°54′20″N 126°11′45″W

Waluk was a Kwakwaka'wakw village of the Tsawataineuk group located at Anchorage Cove on the south shore of the head of Kingcome Inlet in the Central Coast region of British Columbia, Canada. The site was used for timber harvesting, fishing and trapping.

== See also ==
- List of Kwakwaka'wakw villages
