= The Lord of Steel Live =

EP by Manowar
- Released: July 9, 2013
- Recorded: June 21, 2012 – March 16, 2013
- Genre: Heavy metal, power metal
- Length: 27:07
- Label: Magic Circle Music
- Producer: Manowar

Manowar chronology
The Lord of Steel (2012)	The Lord of Steel Live (2013)	Kings of Metal MMXIV (2014)

The Lord of Steel Live is the heavy metal band Manowar's first live EP. It was recorded between 2012 and 2013 during both legs of The Lord of Steel tour with every track recorded in a different country. Live versions of six songs are included, five of them from The Lord of Steel (2012) and one from their previous EP Thunder in the Sky (2009).

Prior to release Manowar announced the complete track list and some other details about the upcoming record through the media. The EP was released in the aftermath of The Lord of Steel tour in 2013 first as a download on iTunes Store, with a physical copy release following.

== Reception ==
The EP's reception was mixed – unfavourable opinions cited the song material itself as a big problem, and disappointment was also expressed towards the production. Positive feedback pointed out that Manowar still performs strong in a live setting.

== Track listing ==
No.	Title	Length
1.	"Thunder in the Sky" (Gods Of Metal Festival, Milan, Italy – June 21, 2012)	4:27
2.	"El Gringo" (Münchenbryggeriet, Stockholm, Sweden – March 10, 2013)	5:23
3.	"Expendable" (The Circus, Helsinki, Finland – March 16, 2013)	3:08
4.	"The Lord of Steel" (Jahrhunderthalle, Frankfurt, Germany – October 20, 2012)	4:04
5.	"Hail Kill and Die" (Stadium Live, Moscow, Russia – November 3, 2012)	4:23
6.	"Manowarriors" (Mala Sportovni Hala, Prague, Czech Republic – October 24, 2012)	4:56

== Personnel ==
- Eric Adams – vocals
- Karl Logan – guitars
- Joey DeMaio – bass
- Donnie Hamzik – drums, percussion

Studio production

- Derk Kloiber – mixing and mastering
- Joey DeMaio – production, mixing, mastering
