= Kingcome Range =

Mountain range in British Columbia, Canada

Coordinates: 50°55′00″N 126°08′00″W

The Kingcome Range is a subrange of the Pacific Ranges of the Coast Mountains, located to the east of Kingcome Inlet.

== See also ==
- Kingcome River
- Kingcome Glacier
- Kingcome (disambiguation)
