= Sisters Island (Queensland) =

Island in Queensland, Australia

- Interactive map of Sisters Island

Geography
- Location: Northern Australia
- Coordinates: 17.746°S 146.161°E
- Area: 0.04 km^{2} (0.015 sq mi)

Administration
- Australia
- State: Queensland

Sisters Island is about 40 km north of Dunk Island. With nearby Stephens Island it forms the South Barnard Islands Group, which is protected within the Barnard Island Group National Park. It is a popular site for tourist kayaking. It is around 4 hectares or 0.04 square km in size.

The island is part of the South Barnard Islands Important Bird Area, identified as such by BirdLife International because of its importance as a breeding site for terns.
