= Mount Stephens (British Columbia) =

Mountain of the Coast Mountains range in British Columbia, Canada

- Location within British Columbia
- Interactive map of Mount Stephens

Highest point
- Elevation: 1,592 m (5,223 ft)
- Prominence: 1,047 m (3,435 ft)
- Parent peak: Thumb Peak
- Listing: Mountains of British Columbia
- Coordinates: 50°58′15″N 126°39′49″W

Geography
- Location: British Columbia, Canada
- District: Range 1 Coast Land District
- Parent range: Pacific Ranges, Coast Mountains
- Topo map: NTS 92L15 Broughton Island

Mount Stephens, 1,592 metres (5,223 ft), prominence 1,047 metres (3,435 ft), also known as Quay, Kwe or k'we in Kwak'wala, is a mountain in the Pacific Ranges of the Coast Mountains in British Columbia, Canada, located in the Central Coast region, northeast of Nimmo Bay and Mackenzie Sound and west of Kingcome Inlet.

As K'we, Mount Stephens was the home of the thunderbird to the Gwawaenuk, who when he descended from the mountain took human form and became the ancestor of that group of Kwakwaka'wakw, whose principal village is now at Hegams, i.e. Hopetown on Watson Island in the Broughton Archipelago, from which a view of this mountain can be seen and is featured in a woodcut by artist Walter Phillips.

== Name origin ==
Mount Stephens was named by Captain Vancouver after Sir Philip Stephens.

== See also ==
- Mount Stephens (disambiguation)
- Stephens (disambiguation)
