= Stephens Island =

Stephens Island or Stephen Island may refer to:

- Stephen Island, Antarctica
- Stephen Island (Torres Strait), Queensland, Australia, also known as Ugar
- Stephens Island (Great Barrier Reef), Queensland, Australia
- Stephens Island (British Columbia), Canada
- Stephens Island (Nunavut), Canada
- Stephens Island (New Zealand), also known as Takapourewa
