= Kingcome =

Kingcome may refer to:

== People ==
- Brian Kingcome (1917–1994), British flying ace in World War II
- John Kingcome, (d.1871), British admiral and commander of the Pacific Station of the Royal Navy
- William Kingcome, nephew of Admiral John Kingcome and captain of the Hudson's Bay Company vessel, the Princess Royal

== Places ==
- Kingcome, British Columbia, a settlement and native village on the Coast of British Columbia
- Kingcome Inlet, an inlet on the Coast of British Columbia
  - Kingcome Inlet, British Columbia, another settlement on that inlet
- the Kingcome River, which enters the head of Kingcome Inlet
- the Kingcome Glacier, a glacier at the head of the Kingcome River
- the Kingcome Range, a.k.a. Kingcome Mountains, a subrange of the Pacific Ranges of the Coast Mountain, located east of Kingcome Inlet.
- Kingcome Point, on Princes Royal Island in the North Coast region of British Columbia

== Other ==
- Kingcome Navigation, a former shipping company on the BC Coast now amalgamated into Seaspan International

== See also ==
- Alexander Turner (jurist) (1901–1993), full name Alexander Kingcome Turner, a notable lawyer in New Zealand and Knight Commander of the Order of the British Empire
- Alfred Newman (politician) (1849–1924), full name Alfred Kingcome Newman, Mayor of Wellington, New Zealand in 1909 and later Member of Parliament in New Zealand
- Kingdom Come (disambiguation)
