= Simoom Sound, British Columbia =

Simoom Sound
- Location of Simoom Sound in British Columbia
- Coordinates: 50°45′10″N 126°29′35″W
- Country: Canada
- Province: British Columbia
- Area codes: 250, 778

Simoom Sound is a post office located at Echo Bay, British Columbia, Canada, on Gilford Island in the Central Coast region adjacent to the body of water of the same name, which was named for HMS Simoom. The name formerly applied to a location on the nearby Wishart Peninsula as a steamer landing but was moved to Echo Bay when the former location became depopulated.

== History of the name and its location ==
Simoom Sound Post Office was opened 1 August 1912, located at SE 1/4 Lot 761 on the Wishart Peninsula facing Simoom Sound (50º50'10" - 126º30'05" as labelled on BC map 1EM, 1919). Some time before 28 June 1943 the post office was moved to the west side of Gilford Island (likely at the seaplane base 50º45'35" - 126º29'10" outside Echo Bay). Some time before February 1967 the post office was moved less than 1 mile south into the settlement at Echo Bay. January 1983 decision by Canada Post to close the post office was evidently reversed, and the Simoom Sound Post Office - located in the settlement of Echo Bay - remains open.

== See also ==
- Echo Bay Marine Provincial Park
