= Hopetown, British Columbia =

Indian Reserve community in Canada

Coordinates: 50°55′25″N 126°49′10″W

Hopetown (Kwak'wala: heǥa̱m's) is an Indian Reserve community of the Gwawa'enux group of Kwakwaka'wakw peoples, located on the south side of Watson Island, to the north of Broughton Island in the Broughton Archipelago on the north side of the Queen Charlotte Strait region on the Central Coast of British Columbia, Canada. The community is located entirely within Hopetown Indian Reserve No. 10A. The traditional name of the village in the Kwak'wala language is Hikums, which has also been spelled Hegams and Hakina and Hegams, meaning "facing outwards".

== History ==
The village may have been visited on August 1, 1792 by Captain George Vancouver. Sometime in the 1860s, the village was abandoned due to a raid by the Bella Bella (Heiltsuk) people and was only used as a fishing station, until c.1904 when the village was re-occupied.

A view of Mount Stephens (Quay, Kwe or k'we), which lies to the east near Nimmo Bay and just west of Kingcome Inlet, is featured in a woodcut by artist Walter Phillips showing a welcome figure at the village.

== See also ==
- List of Indian reserves in British Columbia
- List of Kwakwaka'wakw villages
