= Gods of War Live =

Live album by Manowar
- Released: July 6, 2007
- Recorded: 2007
- Genres: Heavy metal, power metal
- Label: Magic Circle Music

Manowar chronology
Gods of War (2007)	Gods of War Live (2007)	Thunder in the Sky (2009)

Gods of War Live is the third live album by American heavy metal band Manowar. It was recorded in 2007 during the band's tour promoting the Gods of War album.

== Track listing ==
All tracks are written by Joey DeMaio, except where noted.

Disc One
No.	Title	Writer(s)	Length
1.	"Manowar"	Ross the Boss, Joey DeMaio	5:29
2.	"Call to Arms"		4:58
3.	"Gloves of Metal"	Ross, DeMaio	5:32
4.	"Each Dawn I Die"	Ross, DeMaio	4:13
5.	"Holy War"		5:08
6.	"Mountains"		8:05
7.	"The Oath"		4:16
8.	"Secret of Steel"	Ross, DeMaio	6:06
9.	"Son of William's Tale"		4:22
10.	"The Gods Made Heavy Metal"	Karl Logan, DeMaio	6:18
11.	"Die For Metal"	Logan, DeMaio	4:54
12.	"Kings of Metal"	Ross, DeMaio	3:32
13.	"Warriors of the World United"		6:43
14.	"Black Wind, Fire and Steel"		7:50

Disc Two
No.	Title	Length
1.	"The Blood of Odin"	3:57
2.	"The Sons of Odin"	6:21
3.	"Glory, Majesty, Unity"	3:29
4.	"Gods of War"	7:20
5.	"Army of the Dead, Part II"	2:26
6.	"Odin"	5:19
7.	"Hymn of the Immortal Warriors"	5:33
8.	"The Crown and the Ring"	2:47

== Personnel ==
- Eric Adams - vocals
- Karl Logan - guitars
- Joey DeMaio - bass
- Scott Columbus - drums

=== Additional personnel ===
- Joe Rozler - keyboards
- Wolfgang Schmidt - organ

== Charts ==
Chart (2007)	Peak position
Austrian Albums (Ö3 Austria)	69
