= Kliquit =

Coordinates: 50°40′45″N 125°53′00″W

Kliquit or Lekwe't or t'lakwitan, meaning "seaweed body" was a Kwakwaka'wakw village of the Mamalilikulla subgroup located on the north shore of Knight Inlet, east of Hoeya Sound in British Columbia, Canada. The Mamalilikulla used it as a base for fishing and trapping.

== See also ==
- List of Kwakwaka'wakw villages
