= South Barnard Islands Important Bird Area =

Important Bird Area in Queensland, Australia

Coordinates: 17°44′30″S 146°09′38″E

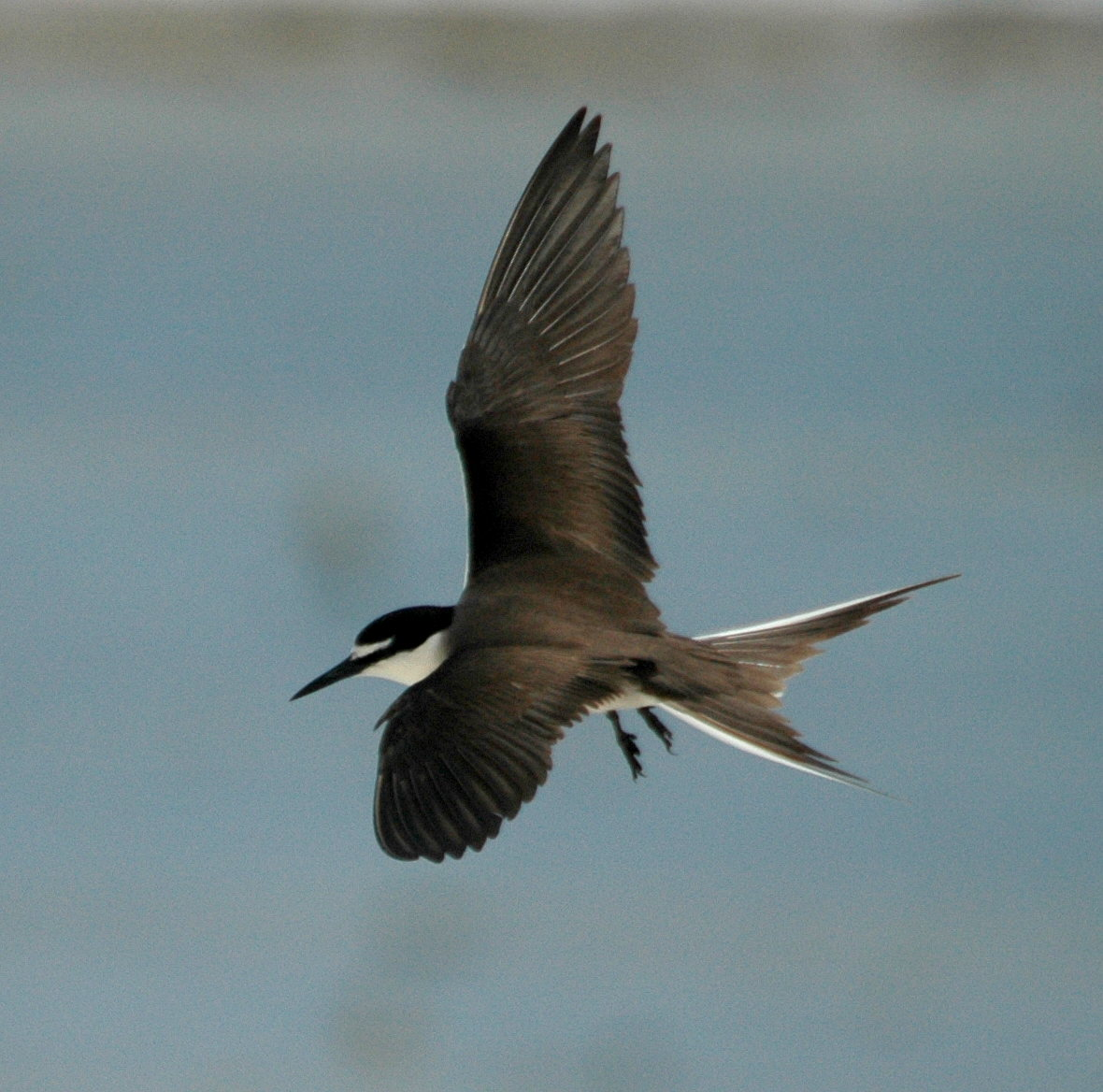
The IBA is an important nesting site for bridled terns

The South Barnard Islands Important Bird Area comprises a group of two small islands and a sand islet, with a combined area of 15 ha, on the inner Great Barrier Reef, Far North Queensland, Australia. The group lies about 6 km off the coast and 26 km south-east of Innisfail and is protected within the Barnard Island Group National Park. It is an important breeding site for terns.

== Description ==
The group contains two forested islands, Stephens and Sisters, joined by intertidal sand. Stephens is a 12 ha rainforested island surrounded by cliffs. Sisters is 2.5 ha, covered with low, dense rainforest with fringing mangroves. Most terns nest on the grassy 0.3 ha islet.

== Birds ==
The islands have been identified by BirdLife International as an Important Bird Area (IBA) because they have supported over 1% of the world populations of lesser crested terns (with up to 1000 breeding pairs) and bridled terns (up to 10,000 breeding pairs). Some 120 pairs of roseate terns bred in the IBA in 1985, and up to 1500 non-breeding black-naped terns have been recorded there.
