= The Final Battle I =

EP by Manowar
- Released: March 29, 2019
- Genres: Heavy metal, power metal
- Length: 19:28
- Label: Magic Circle Music
- Producer: Joey DeMaio

Manowar chronology
Kings of Metal MMXIV (2014)	The Final Battle I (2019)	Highlights from the Revenge of Odysseus (2022)

Professional ratings
Review scores
Source	Rating
Brave Words & Bloody Knuckles	6/10
Earshot.at	0/10
Ghost Cult Magazine	8/10
Metal Storm	3.5/10
Rock Hard	6/10
Tourtureview	2.5/5 stars

The Final Battle I is the fifth EP by American heavy metal band Manowar, released March 29, 2019. It is the first recording without former member Karl Logan, who was arrested a year prior. He was replaced with guitarist E. V. Martel, who first was a touring replacement following Logan's arrest. On March 22, 2019, the band announced that they would release a trilogy of EP's based upon The Final Battle World Tour. Plans for any follow-up recordings were silently canceled for unknown reasons. The first EP, The Final Battle I, was released on March 29 in an exclusive pre-sale at the merchandise booth in Frankfurt and also during the European shows. It was then released on iTunes worldwide that day. The EP was digitally and physically released on May 30. Former HammerFall and Yngwie Malmsteen drummer Anders Johansson was announced as the new live drummer shortly after and made his debut at the March 25 show in Brno, afterward joining the band full time. In promotion of the EP, the band went on tour, dubbed "The Final Battle World Tour 2019". Upon the reveal of the EP, fans and critics believed the title was a reference to this being their final studio recording before retiring. Despite the tour's name, the band's bassist, Joey DeMaio however, dismissed any claims of Manowar's retirement, mainly due to the fans' demands to have them continue to perform. In an interview published on Manowar's website, bassist Joey DeMaio says Manowar is not breaking up and The Final Battle is not their farewell tour.

== Reception ==
Reception of the recording has ranged from mixed to negative from fans and critics alike. Gary Alcock of Ghost Cult Magazine gave a roaring review, stating that it is "As TRUE and gloriously HEAVY FUCKING METAL as it gets, TFBI is a superb, if all too short release which hearkens back to the band’s glory years." On Tortureviews, a reviewer stated that, while there are some elements that remind of the former glory, and are reminiscent of the best of times in the Manowar history, the EP is incredibly average as a whole. They spoke highly of Eric Adams, saying how he still retains all the power and gravitas of his earlier days, and that his vocals are the best thing about this EP. "Sure, the cheesy lyrics do him no favors, but his deliverance is both big sounding befitting the Manowar name and his depth shows little signs of age." However, they added that on the final track how Joey DeMaio "takes center stage, barking in a sort of spoken word style, ruining any worth the song might have had (which is not much, a slow overlong drab, at any rate)." A review from Headbangers Lifestyle was positive of the recording, saying that it will certainly be welcomed by their diehard fan community, but is not likely to be very appealing to a wider audience. "But all in all; an EP for the fans!" they concluded.

== Tracklisting ==
All tracks are written by Joey DeMaio.

No.	Title	Length
1.	"March of the Heroes into Valhalla" (Instrumental)	2:39
2.	"Blood and Steel"	4:42
3.	"Sword of the Highlands"	5:59
4.	"You Shall Die Before I Die"	6:08

== Personnel ==
Band

- Joey DeMaio – bass, keyboards, vocals (track 4)
- Eric Adams – vocals
- Anders Johansson – drums, percussion
- E. V. Martel – guitars

Guest/Session

- Joe "Slash" Rozler – keyboards

Miscellaneous staff

- Jan "Örkki" Yrlund – layout
- Joey DeMaio – producer
- Ken Kelly – cover art
