= Bond Sound =

Coordinates: 50°50′37″N 126°10′56″W

Bond Sound is a sound located on the northeast side of Tribune Channel in the Central Coast region of British Columbia. Bond Sound, with the head of Kingcome Inlet to its north, frames the Wishart Peninsula. Like other names in the area, it was named by Captain Pender in 1865, in association with other names in the area associated with HMS Tribune.

Ahta Indian Reserve No. 3 is located at the sound's northeast corner, at the mouth of the Ahta River.

To the west of Bond Sound, on the same side of Tribune Channel, is Kwatsi Bay.
