= Wakhanaq =

Former village in British Columbia, Canada

Wakhanaq Wak'a'nakw
- Former village
- Location in British Columbia
- Coordinates: 50°48′55″N 126°18′00″W
- Country: Canada
- Province: British Columbia
- Region: Central Coast
- Indigenous group: Kwakwaka'wakw

Wakhanaq, or Wak'a'nakw, meaning "real river" in Kwak'wala, was a village of the Kwakwaka'wakw located on the north side of Gilford Island at the head of Wakhana Bay. The centre of Wahkana Bay, which is immediately south of Kwatsi Bay across Tribune Channel, is at 50°49′21″N 126°16′17″W

The village site was used by the (Southern) Kwakiutl, Kwicksataineuk and Kweeha (Kwiakah) groups of Kwakwaka'wakw. Franz Boas recounted that the Kwakiutl and Kweeha had their origins here.

== See also ==
- List of Kwakwaka'wakw villages
