= Teruo =

- Gender: Male

Origin
- Origin: Japanese
- Meaning: Different meanings depending on the kanji used

Teruo (written: 輝雄, 輝男, 輝夫, 辉夫, 昭雄, 照雄 or 照夫) is a masculine Japanese given name. Notable people with the name include:

- Teruo Abe (安部 輝雄; fl. 1934), Japanese footballer
- Teruo Akiyama (秋山 輝男; 1891–1943), Imperial Japanese Navy admiral
- Teruo Chinen (知念 辉夫; born 1941), Japanese karateka
- Chiyozakura Teruo (千代櫻 輝夫; born 1950), Japanese sumo wrestler
- Teruo Funai (船井 照夫; born 1938), Japanese long-distance runner
- Hata Teruo (秦 テルヲ; 1887–1945), Japanese painter
- Teruo Higa (比嘉 照夫; born 1941), Japanese academic
- Teruo Ishii (石井 輝男; 1924–2005), Japanese film director
- Teruo Itokawa (糸川 照雄; 1940–2000), Japanese shot putter
- Teruo Iwamoto (岩本 輝雄; born 1972), Japanese footballer
- Teruo Kakuta, Japanese manga artist
- Teruo Murakami (村上 輝夫; 1938-2013), Japanese table tennis player
- Teruo Nakamura (中村 輝夫; 1919−1979), Taiwanese-born Imperial Japanese Army soldier
- Teruo Nakamura (golfer) (born 1952), Japanese golfer
- Teruo Nakamura (musician) (中村 照夫; born 1942), Japanese jazz musician
- Teruo Nimura (二村 昭雄; born 1943), Japanese footballer
- Teruo Sugihara (杉原 輝雄; 1937–2011), Japanese golfer
- Teruo Yajima (矢島 輝夫; 1939−1999), Japanese writer
- Terry Teruo Kawamura, United States Army soldier

== Fictional Characters ==
- Teruo Suzuki, a young boy who were disguised as Arch Orphnoch/Orphnoch King in Kamen Rider 555

== See also ==
- 5924 Teruo, a main-belt asteroid
