= Highlights from the Revenge of Odysseus =

EP by Manowar
- Released: June 22, 2022
- Genre: Heavy metal; power metal
- Length: 14:17
- Label: Magic Circle
- Producer: Joey DeMaio

Manowar chronology
The Final Battle I (2019)	Highlights from the Revenge of Odysseus (2022)

Professional ratings
Review scores
Source	Rating
Metal Digest	20%
Hellfire Magazine	4/10

Highlights from the Revenge of Odysseus is the sixth EP by American heavy metal band Manowar, released digitally on streaming services on June 22, 2022. The EP is based on the Odyssey, Homer's tale of the great hero Odysseus and his long and perilous quest to return to his wife and son, and is a sampler of a bigger work to be released. The songs were premiered at the Release Athens festival in Greece on June 22, 2022, which is also where the band started their Revenge of Odysseus anniversary tour.

== Composition ==
For the EP, Manowar stayed true to the historic tale of the Odyssey, similar to what they had done to the 28-minute track "Achilles, Agony and Ecstasy in Eight Parts" in 1992.

== Reception ==
The release garnered generally negative reviews from critics. A review in the German webzine Hellfire Magazin called it "a poor EP wearing crackerjack clothes" and stated that they felt cheated, with two of the five tracks being just under a minute. While they enjoyed Chiara Tricarico's powerful voice on "Where Eagles Fly", they deplored Eric Adams limping for six and a half minutes on "Immortal". "Does this EP make the listener want to don their helmet, breastplate, shield, and grab their hoplite spear? Does it make them want to defend Ithaca with all their might? The answer is no. This is a piss-poor EP, and if you see wimps and posers wearing crackerjack clothes... it is no bloody wonder. This is literally for completionists only". The review further stated that "Athena's Theme" was ultimately dispensable, and "Telemachus – Part I" is nothing more than a radio play passage written in ancient Greek. After the cheesy ballad "Where Eagles Fly" and another radio-play track preparing the listener yet again (in Greek), they mention the final track, "Immortal", as a 'high point'. The review concludes that Highlights from the Revenge of Odysseus "isn't any better than The Final Battle I and rather confirms that it is time for Manowar to step down before fans of their first six/seven albums are completely sold out pissed off.

== Track listing ==
No.	Title	Length
1.	"Athena's Theme"	0:57
2.	"Telemachus – Part I"	2:42
3.	"Where Eagles Fly"	3:27
4.	"Odysseus and Calypso – The Island of Ogygia"	0:45
5.	"Immortal"	6:26
Total length:		14:17

== Personnel ==
Manowar

- Eric Adams – vocals
- Joey DeMaio – bass, guitars

Guest/session

- Dave Chedrick – drums
- Michael Angelo Batio – guitars (track 5)
- Kostas Kazakos – narration (track 4)
- Konstantinos Kazakos – narration (track 2)
- Sakis Tolis – narration (track 2); lyrics (tracks 2, 4)
- Chiara Tricarico – vocals (track 3)
