= Ksgaxl/Stephens Island Conservancy =

Canadian conservation area

- IUCN category II (national park)
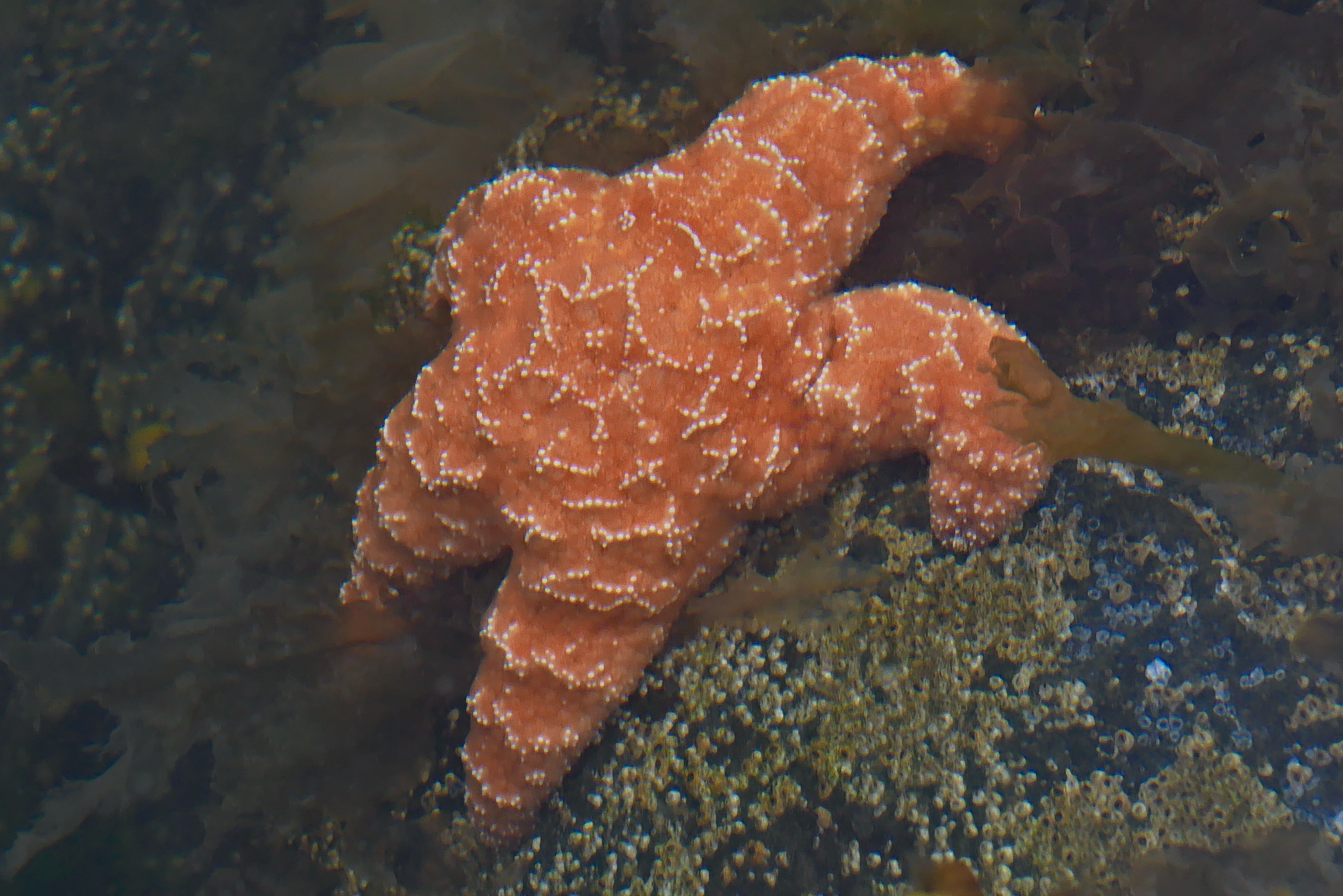
- Ochre star in Qlawdzeet Anchorage
- Interactive map of Ksgaxl/Stephens Island Conservancy
- Location: Canada
- Nearest city: Prince Rupert
- Coordinates: 54°09′09″N 130°44′13″W
- Area: 14,081 ha (54.37 sq mi)
- Established: June 27, 2008
- Operator: BC Parks

The Ksgaxl/Stephens Island Conservancy contains an entire island group, including Stephens and Prescott, and surrounding islands (Philip, Arthur, Skiakl, the Archibalds, and the Tree Nob Group).

Ksgaxl falls within the traditional territory of the Gitwilgyoots, and means Place of Shrub in Sm’algyax. At least seven village sites, and nine archaeological sites, are located in the conservancy.

== Ecology ==
Terrestrial mammals in the conservancy include wolves and black-tailed deer.

Marine mammals that use the area include orca, humpbacks, Steller sea lions, Pacific white-sided dolphins, harbour seals, and porpoises.

== See also ==
- Stephens Island
