= I Heard the Owl Call My Name =

1967 novel by Margaret Craven

- First edition
- Author: Margaret Craven
- Language: English
- Publisher: Clarke, Irwin & Company
- Publication date: 1967
- Publication place: Canada
- Pages: 159
- ISBN: 0-440-34369-0

I Heard the Owl Call My Name is a best-selling 1967 novel by Margaret Craven. The book tells the story of a young Anglican priest named Mark Brian who, unbeknownst to him, has not long to live. He learns about the meaning of life when he is to be sent to a First Nations community in British Columbia.

== Publication ==
First published in Canada in 1967, it was not until 1973 that the book was picked up by an American publisher. Released to wide acclaim, it reached No. 1 on The New York Times Best Seller list.

== Synopsis ==
Mark Brian, a young priest, is sent to the First Nations community of Kingcome in British Columbia, home to people of the Dzawa̱da̱'enux̱w tribe of the Kwakwaka'wakw nation (who are given the now-archaic name "Kwakiutl" in the book). His bishop sends him, knowing that Mark is suffering from an unnamed and fatal disease, in order to learn all there is about life including some of life's hard lessons in the time left to him. Mark is unaware of his terminal illness and his bishop does not tell him. Life in the remote community is simple yet it offers many lessons for Mark. He learns to win the friendship of some of the First Nations people and encounters their deeply rooted faith and ancient beliefs. This helps him mature more quickly. He has to face a number of difficult situations when people die in the village. Mark is open-minded, yet he has much to learn.

Through various experiences and inter-relationships, Mark learns from the villagers and they from him. By the time he has spent one year there, he considers the small community his home and family and they consider him part of their nation.

Mark is about to be recalled by his bishop when he hears the owl call his name, which foretells imminent death according to Kwakwaka'wakw belief.

The book presents both sympathetic and unsympathetic white characters. Those that come to sight-see the village and to exploit and those that come to learn and to help. Its Dzawa̱da̱'enux̱w characters who have contact with the outside world variously succeed and fail to survive in it. The book emphasizes how hard it is for them to adapt to the outside world. The work debates whether the Dzawa̱da̱'enux̱w culture and way of life is dying or whether it can survive. The remoteness of the village suggests that it may be possible for the culture to survive.

== TV film adaptation ==
In 1973, the year of its American release, the book was adapted by Gerald Di Pego as a CBS television movie of the same title directed by Daryl Duke and starring Tom Courtenay and Dean Jagger.

== Again Calls the Owl ==
Margaret Craven later wrote an autobiography titled Again Calls the Owl which is often incorrectly referred to as a sequel to I Heard the Owl Call My Name. However, it is a true recounting of Craven's life. She spent time studying the native culture to write the original book. Though it does describe some of the real events which would later inspire the characters and plot of I Heard the Owl Call My Name, it does not feature any of the characters or continue the story of the novel.
