= Stephens Island (British Columbia) =

Island in British Columbia, Canada

Native name: Ksgaxl
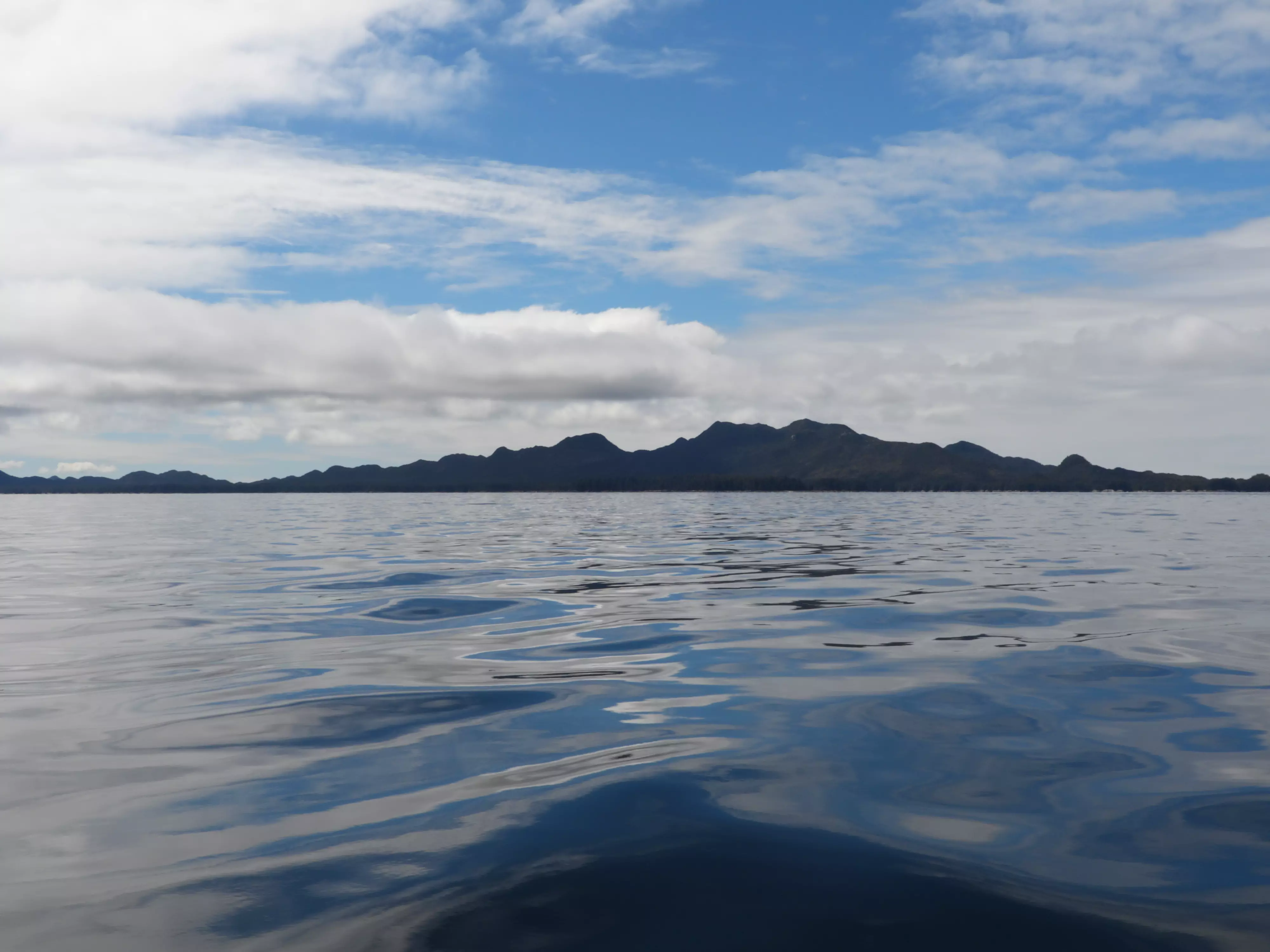
- Northeast end of Stephens Island, as seen from Brown Passage

- Location within British Columbia

Geography
- Coordinates: 54°09′28″N 130°43′54″W
- Area: 14,000 ha (35,000 acres)

Stephens Island (Tsimshian: Ksgaxl) is an island in Canada, on the British Columbian Coast, to the northwest of Porcher Island, to the southwest of the city of Prince Rupert, and divides Chatham Sound from Hecate Strait. The island was named by Captain Vancouver in honour of Sir Philip Stephens, secretary to the Admiralty from 1763 to 1795.

Qlawdzeet Anchorage, located at the north end of Stephens Island between Hooper Point and Avery Island, is useful for fishers and pilots, and has pilings tucked in behind Dunn Island. This is where Vancouver met Brown on 20 July 1793, with a squadron of three vessels, Butterworth, Jackal, and Prince Le Boo.

The island is one of the two main islands (the other is Prescott) that are part of the Ksgaxl/Stephens Island Conservancy.

== History ==
The island once contained villages comparable in size to the largest settlements in the Dundas Islands and Prince Rupert Harbour. In addition to the major villages, several smaller shell-bearing sites were found on terraces about 10 metres (33 ft) above the present shoreline. Two distinct occupation phases have been identified: one dating from approximately 6400-9500 YPB, and another from about 5000-7200 YBP.

== Geology ==
Its main geological feature is the Early Cretaceous Stephens Island pluton, which dates to the Albian era (102±8 Ma), and provides the backbone connecting Mount Stephens, at 432 metres (1,417 ft), 54°07′39″N 130°40′15″W at the island's southeast end, to Congreve Hill, at 150 metres (490 ft) 54°09′29″N 130°42′31″W in the northwest.

== Indian reserves ==
Squaderee Indian Reserve No. 91 is located on the west side of the island's northern part, at 54°08′00″N 130°47′00″W on Skiakl Bay at 54°08′17″N 130°47′02″W, in which there is a small island, Skiakl Island, at 54°07′38″N 130°45′44″W.

Off Stephens Island's northern tip is Avery Island at 54°12′42″N 130°45′32″W, the whole of which constitutes Avery Island Indian Reserve No. 92, Both it and Squadaree IR No. 9 are under the administration of the Metlakatla First Nation. It lies in Qlawdzeet Anchorage which is at 54°12′15″N 130°46′09″W. Overlooking that from the south, at the northern tip of Stephens Island itself, is Qlawd Hill at 54°11′28″N 130°46′29″W.

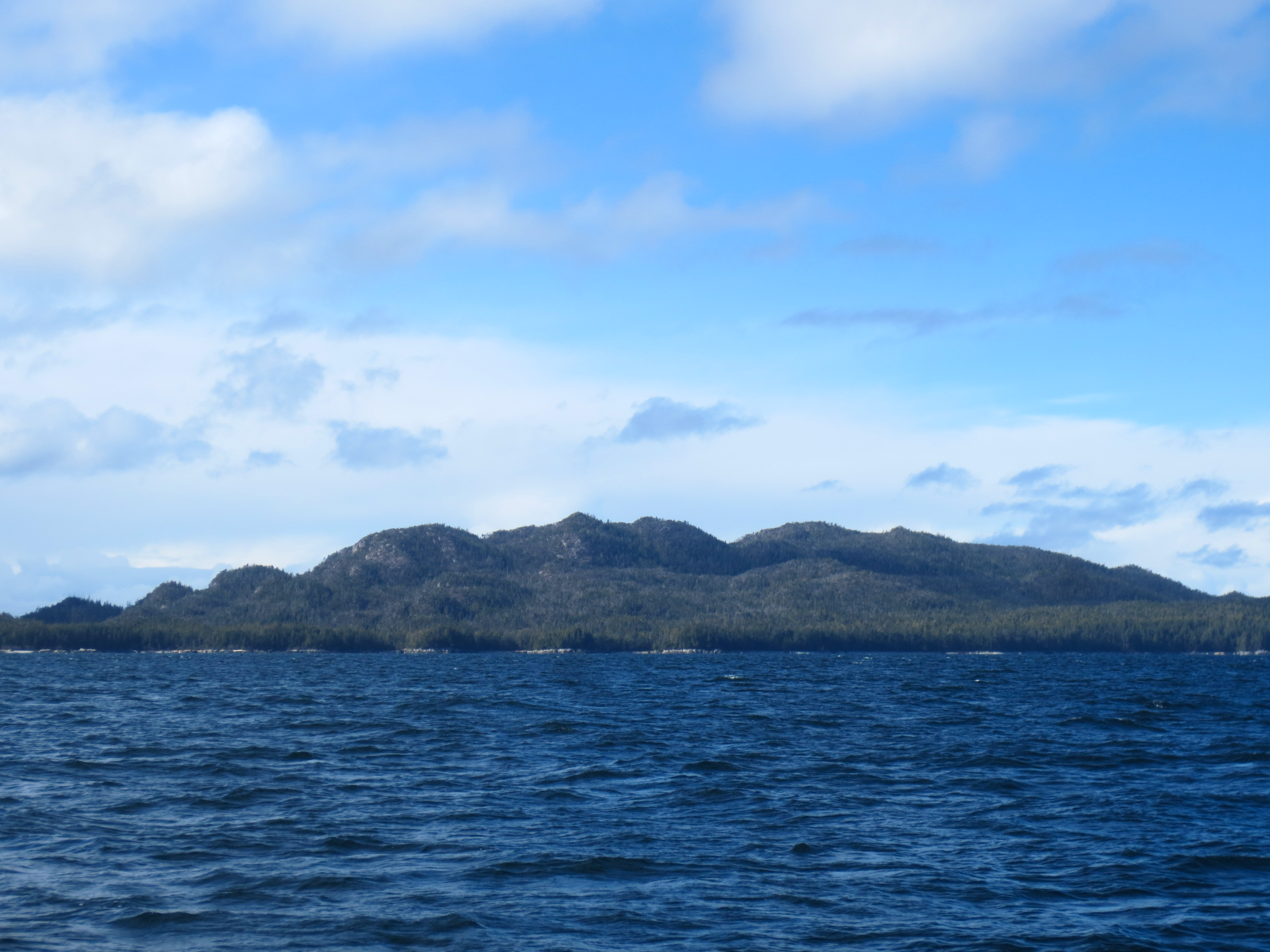
Looking at Prescott island from Chatham Sound

== Other features and adjoining islands ==
Other small islands adjoining Stephens Island include Skiakl Island, Philip Island, Parry Island, Arthur Island, and Joyce Island.

Prescott Island is the largest of the small islands around Stephens Island, lying to its southeast between it and Porcher Island at 54°11′28″N 130°46′29″W.

== See also ==
- Stephens Island (disambiguation)
- Stephens (disambiguation)
- Mount Stephens (disambiguation)
