= Jessie Island =

Island in Queensland, Australia

- Interactive map of Jessie Island

Geography
- Location: Northern Australia
- Coordinates: 17.674°S 146.174°E
- Area: 0.03 km^{2} (0.012 sq mi)

Administration
- Australia
- State: Queensland

Jessie Island is about 80 km north of Dunk Island and east of the Cowley Beach Training area (established 1977) and north of the South Barnard Islands.

Jessie Island is north of Kent Island and is part of the North Barnard Islands. It is around 3 hectares or 0.03 square km in size.

This island is protected by the Department of Environment and Heritage Protection due to the migratory birds that rest on the island.

Jessie Island is a popular kayaking location and there have been sightings of humpback whales.

In early World War II, Jessie Island was used as a Russian temporary airforce landing point.

== See also ==
- List of islands of Australia
