= Echo Bay, British Columbia =

Echo Bay
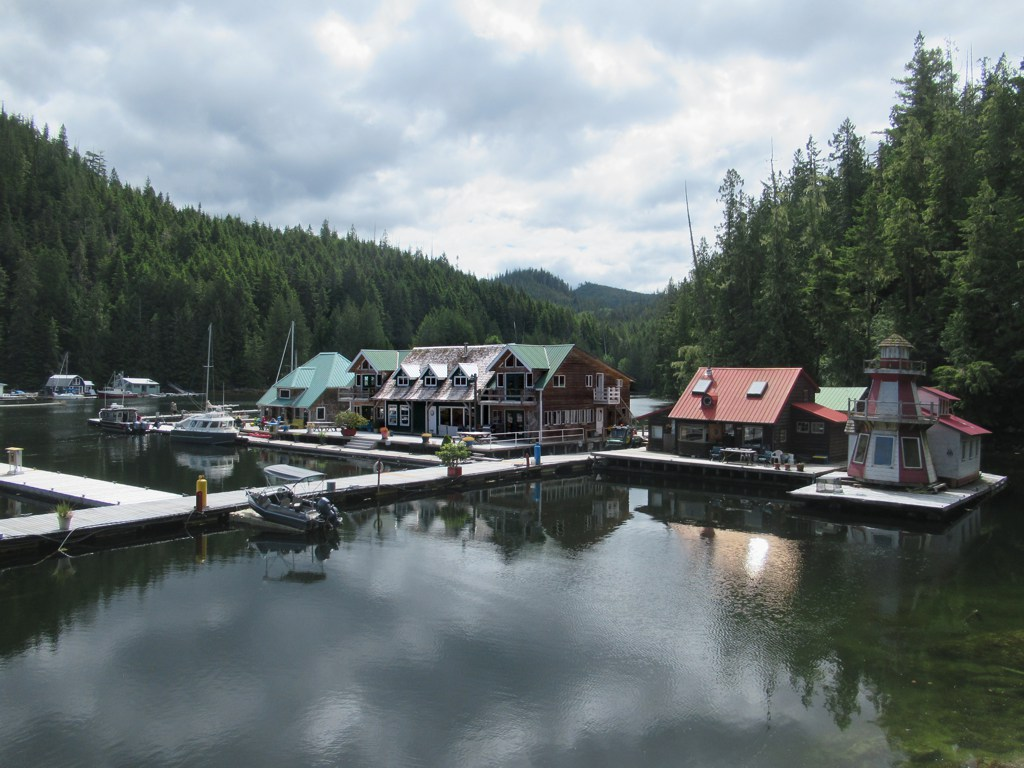
- Echo Bay Resort

- Location of Echo Bay in British Columbia
- Coordinates: 50°45′00″N 126°29′41″W
- Country: Canada
- Province: British Columbia
- Regional District: Mount Waddington
- Area codes: 250, 778

Echo Bay is an unincorporated settlement located on the west side of Gilford Island in the Broughton Archipelago on the Central Coast of British Columbia, Canada. It is the location of the Simoom Sound post office, which used to be on the nearby Wishart Peninsula facing the sound of the same name.

== See also ==
- Echo Bay Marine Provincial Park
