= Echo Bay Marine Provincial Park =

Provincial Park in British Columbia, Canada

- IUCN category II (national park)
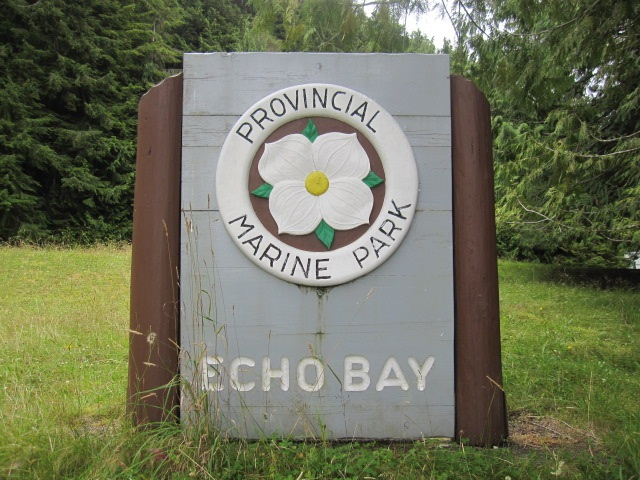
- Echo Bay Provincial Park sign

- Location within Vancouver Island Location within British Columbia
- Interactive map of Echo Bay Marine Provincial Park
- Location: Range 1 Coast Land District, British Columbia, Canada
- Nearest city: Port McNeill, BC
- Coordinates: 50°45′02″N 126°29′41″W
- Area: 1.5 ha (3.7 acres)
- Established: January 26, 1971
- Governing body: BC Parks

Echo Bay Marine Provincial Park is a provincial park in British Columbia, Canada, established in 1971 and containing 1.5 hectares (3.7 acres). It is located at the bay of the same name, offshore from the community of the same name, which is the location of the Simoom Sound post office and is on the west side of Gilford Island.
