= Hata (surname) =

Hata (written: 畑, 秦, 羽田 or 波田) is a Japanese surname. Notable people with the surname include:

- Aki Hata (畑 亜貴, born 1966), Japanese musician and lyricist
- Ikuhiko Hata (秦 郁彦, born 1932), Japanese historian
- Daiki Hata (畑 大樹, born 1982), Japanese mixed martial artist
- Junki Hata (畑 潤基, born 1994), Japanese footballer
- Kenjiro Hata (畑 健二郎, born 1975), Japanese manga artist
- Masanori Hata (畑 正憲, born 1935), Japanese zoologist, essayist, and filmmaker
- Minoru Hata (畑 実, born 1989), Japanese footballer
- Mitsuhide Hata (畑 満秀, born 1948), Japanese sprint canoeist
- Motohiro Hata (秦 基博, born 1980), Japanese singer-songwriter
- Prateep Ungsongtham Hata (born 1952), Thai activist and politician
- Rocky Hata (1948–1991), Japanese professional wrestler
- Sahachiro Hata (秦 佐八郎, 1873–1938), Japanese bacteriologist
- Sawako Hata (秦 佐和子, born 1988), Japanese singer and idol
- Shunroku Hata (畑 俊六, 1879–1962), Japanese field marshal during World War II
- Hata Teruo (秦 テルヲ, 1887–1945), Japanese painter
- Toyosuke Hata (秦 豊助, 1872–1933), Japanese politician and cabinet minister in the Empire of Japan
- Tsutomu Hata (羽田 孜, 1935–2017), Japanese politician and Prime Minister of Japan
- Yawara Hata (畑 和, 1910–1996), Japanese politician
- Yoku Hata (波田 陽区, born 1975), Japanese stand-up comedian
- Yuichiro Hata (羽田 雄一郎, born 1967), Japanese politician

== See also ==
- Hata clan
