= Kent Island (Queensland) =

Island in Queensland, Australia

Coordinates: 17°40′34″S 146°10′48″E

- Interactive map of Kent Island

Geography
- Location: Coral Sea
- Archipelago: Barnard Island Group
- Total islands: 7

Administration
- Australia
- State: Queensland
- Region: Far North Queensland
- Local government area: Cassowary Coast Region

Kent Island is an island in the Australian state of Queensland located about 80 km North of Dunk Island and east of the Cowley Beach Training area (established 1977) and north of the South Barnard Islands. North west of Kent Island is Jessie Island, Hutchinson Island and Bresnahan Island.

== Geography ==
The island is part of the North Barnard Islands which includes a total of five islands. These islands are high continental islands which rise from the seafloor.

== History ==
The waters around the island were inhabited by the Mamu people. A small lighthouse was built on the island in 1897.

== Protected area status ==
Kent Island is located within the boundaries of the Barnard Island Group National Park. The island is considered significant because migratory birds rest here.

== Recreational activities ==
The island is also a site for popular tourist kayaking and there have been sightings of humpback whales.

Camping is permitted on the island.

== See also ==
- List of islands of Australia
- Protected areas of Queensland
