= Nalakglala =

Coordinates: 50°42′30″N 125°57′10″W

Nalakgala or nalaxdlala, meaning "hind end up river", was a Kwakwaka'wakw village at the head of Hoeya Sound on the north side of Knight Inlet in British Columbia. This was a place of origin for the Walas group, but by 1914 the village site and associated harvesting area was claimed by the Mamalilikulla.

== See also ==
- List of Kwakwaka'wakw villages
