= Mount Stephens =

Mount Stephens may refer to:

Canada

- Mount Stephens (Stephens Island), British Columbia, Canada
- Mount Stephens (British Columbia), Canada
- Mount Stephens (Skeena Mountains), British Columbia, Canada

United States

- Mount Stephens (Nevada), United States
- Prospect Peak (Park County, Wyoming) has also been called Mount Stephens

Antarctica

- Mount Stephens (Antarctica)

== See also ==
- Mount Stephenson
