= Kings of Metal MMXIV =

Studio album by Manowar
- Released: February 7, 2014 (download); February 28, 2014 (Silver Edition CD)
- Genre: Heavy metal, power metal
- Length: 89:13
- Label: Magic Circle
- Producer: Joey DeMaio

Manowar chronology
The Lord of Steel Live (2013)	Kings of Metal MMXIV (2014)	The Final Battle I (2019)

Professional ratings
Review scores
Source	Rating
metal.de	7/10
Metal Hammer	3/7
Ultimate Guitar	6.7/10
Ghost Cult Magazine	3/10

Kings of Metal MMXIV is a re-recorded album by American heavy metal band Manowar, released in February 2014. It is a re-recording of their album Kings of Metal from 1988. In support of the album the band started their "Kings of Metal MMXIV World Tour".

== Track listing ==
Tracks 10 and 11 on disc 1 are listed as bonus tracks.

CD 1
No.	Title	Notes	Length
1.	"Hail and Kill MMXIV"		06:13
2.	"Kings of Metal MMXIV"		03:42
3.	"The Heart of Steel MMXIV" (Acoustic Intro)		05:09
4.	"A Warrior's Prayer MMXIV"		05:44
5.	"The Blood of the Kings MMXIV"		08:01
6.	"Thy Kingdom Come MMXIV"		04:06
7.	"The Sting of the Bumblebee MMXIV"	instrumental	01:16
8.	"Thy Crown and Thy Ring MMXIV" (Orchestral Version)		04:57
9.	"On Wheels of Fire MMXIV"		04:14
10.	"Thy Crown and Thy Ring MMXIV" (Metal Version)	bonus track	04:57
11.	"The Heart of Steel MMXIV" (Guitar Instrumental)	bonus track; instrumental	04:50
Total length:			53:09

CD 2
No.	Title	Length
1.	"Hail and Kill MMXIV" (Instrumental)	06:13
2.	"Kings of Metal MMXIV" (Instrumental)	03:42
3.	"The Heart of Steel MMXIV" (Orchestral Intro Version – Instrumental)	04:50
4.	"The Blood of the Kings MMXIV" (Instrumental)	08:01
5.	"Thy Kingdom Come MMXIV" (Instrumental)	04:07
6.	"Thy Crown and Thy Ring MMXIV" (Orchestral Version – Instrumental)	04:57
7.	"On Wheels of Fire MMXIV" (Instrumental)	04:14
Total length:		36:04

== Personnel ==
Manowar

- Eric Adams – vocals
- Joey DeMaio – bass, keyboards
- Karl Logan – guitars, keyboards
- Donnie Hamzik – drums

Production

- Brian Blessed – grandfather's voice in spoken narration on "A Warrior's Prayer MMXIV"

== Charts ==
Chart (2014)	Peak position
German Albums (Offizielle Top 100)	55
