= Igisbalis =

Kwakwaka'wakw village on the Central Coast of British Columbia, Canada

Coordinates: 50°41′25″N 125°58′55″W

igisbalis, meaning "sandy beach at point", was village and halibut-fishing station of the Mamalilikulla group of Kwakwaka'wakw just behind Hoeya Head, on the south side of the opening of Hoeya Sound on Knight Inlet in the Central Coast region of British Columbia, Canada.

== See also ==
- List of Kwakwaka'wakw villages
