= Ahta River =

River in British Columbia, Canada

Coordinates: 50°52′10″N 126°09′56″W

The Ahta River is a river in the Central Coast of British Columbia, flowing into Bond Sound to the south via the short Ahta Valley, which connects to the head of Kingcome Inlet to the north.

Ahta Indian Reserve No. 3, which is the site of a former Kwakwaka'wakw village named Hata or Hada or Ahta, is located at the mouth of the Ahta River.

== See also ==
- List of rivers of British Columbia
