= Thunder in the Sky =

EP by Manowar
- Released: 2009
- Genre: Heavy metal, power metal

Manowar chronology
Gods of War Live (2007)	Thunder in the Sky (2009)	Battle Hymns MMXI (2010)

Thunder in the Sky is an EP released in 2009 by the heavy metal band Manowar, promoting the upcoming full-length album The Lord of Steel. However, none of the songs are included on that album, and with the exception of the original version of "Crown and the Ring" on any Manowar album.

The EP was sold during the Death to Infidels Tour in all concert locations. It was also available for purchase as a digital album on the Kingdom Of Steel Online Store, the official Manowar online store.

The EP contains 16 different versions of the song "Father", all sung in different languages. In addition to the English version, it was also sung in: Bulgarian, Croatian, Finnish, French, German, Greek, Hungarian, Italian, Japanese, Norwegian, Polish, Brazilian Portuguese, Romanian, Spanish and Turkish.

Eric Adams was guided through the singing process by fans who volunteered to translate from each country. This is one of few times when a Manowar song was officially translated and performed by the band.

This album also includes a re-recorded metal version of Manowar's epic-ballad "The Crown & the Ring", which is very popular among Manowar fans.

== Track listing ==
Disc 1
No.	Title	Length
1.	"Thunder in the Sky"	4:24
2.	"Let the Gods Decide"	3:37
3.	"Father"	3:52
4.	"Die with Honor"	4:19
5.	"The Crown and the Ring" (Metal Version)	4:57
6.	"God or Man"	4:52

Disc 2
No.	Title	Length
1.	"Татко" (Father - Bulgarian Version)	4:16
2.	"Otac" (Father - Croatian Version)	4:16
3.	"Isä" (Father - Finnish Version)	4:16
4.	"Mon Père" (Father - French Version)	4:16
5.	"Vater" (Father - German Version)	4:16
6.	"Πατέρα" (Father - Greek Version)	4:16
7.	"Apa" (Father - Hungarian Version)	4:16
8.	"Padre" (Father - Italian Version)	4:16
9.	"父" (Father - Japanese Version)	4:16
10.	"Far" (Father - Norwegian Version)	4:16
11.	"Ojciec" (Father - Polish Version)	4:16
12.	"Pai" (Father - Portuguese Version)	4:16
13.	"Tată" (Father - Romanian Version)	4:16
14.	"Padre" (Father - Spanish Version)	4:16
15.	"Baba" (Father - Turkish Version)	4:16

== Charts ==
Chart (2009)	Peak position
Austrian Albums (Ö3 Austria)	72
German Albums (Offizielle Top 100)	28
