= HMS Simoom (1849) =

Iron troopship

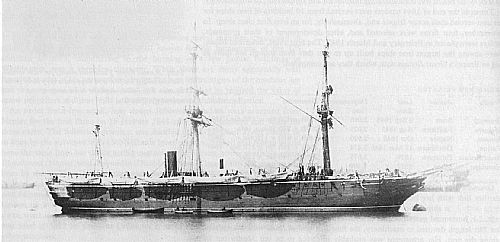
- HMS Simoom

History

United Kingdom
- Name: Simoom
- Builder: Robert Napier and Sons in Govan Yard No 17
- Laid down: October 1845
- Launched: 24 May 1849
- Fate: Sold 1887 for breaking up

General characteristics
- Type: Frigate
- Displacement: 2,240 long tons (2,280 t)
- Length: 246 ft (75.0 m)
- Beam: 41 ft 9 in (12.7 m)
- Draught: 26 ft 7 in (8.1 m)
- Installed power: 604 bhp (450 kW) (steam)
- Propulsion: Steam engine, 1 shaft, 4-cyl, horizontal single expansion
- Troops: 769
- Crew: 175
- Armament: 8 × guns

HMS Simoom was an iron frigate converted to an iron screw troopship. She was laid down in October 1845; however, on 23 April 1847 her frigate design was abandoned as this type of iron warship was considered to be unsuitable against cannon fire and she was ordered to be completed as a troopship. She was launched by Robert Napier and Sons in Govan, Yard No 17, on 24 May 1849, then sold to Collings, Dartmouth in June 1887.

== Design and description ==
Simoom was designed to serve as an iron frigate; however, testing under heavy gunfire, carried out on the paddle steamer Ruby, "demonstrated unmistakably that the splintering characteristics of the iron then used in shipbuilding rendered unprotected ships built of this material totally unsuitable as warships". Consequently, Simoom and HMS Megaera were reduced to serve as transport ships. The Royal Navy used troopships to carry soldiers and supplies to conflicts in British overseas interests. Other contemporary examples included the Euphrates-class troopships, that were designed to support operations in India and Crimea.

Simoom was armed with eight guns and powered by 604 bhp (450 kW) Boulton & Watt, Birmingham steam engines, driving one propeller shaft.

== Construction and career ==
HMS Simoom (1849) was designed as an iron frigate but launched as an iron troopship. The following notes for Simoom's career below are compiled from the RootsWeb Naval Database.

2 Apr 1851 At her trial along the measured mile on Friday, attained to a mean speed of 8½ nautical miles per hour, the engines making an average of forty-seven revolutions per minute. She was very low down in the water during the trial, particularly by the steam, having ballast on board equal in weight to what her stores, &c., would be. A doubt existed previous to the trial as to whether her engines would work up to their full speed, but the above result has removed that doubt. The Simoom will now be fitted with a topgallant forecastle and a poop, and otherwise adapted for a troop ship, for the duties of which her great size and tonnage strongly recommend her.

1852 Troopship

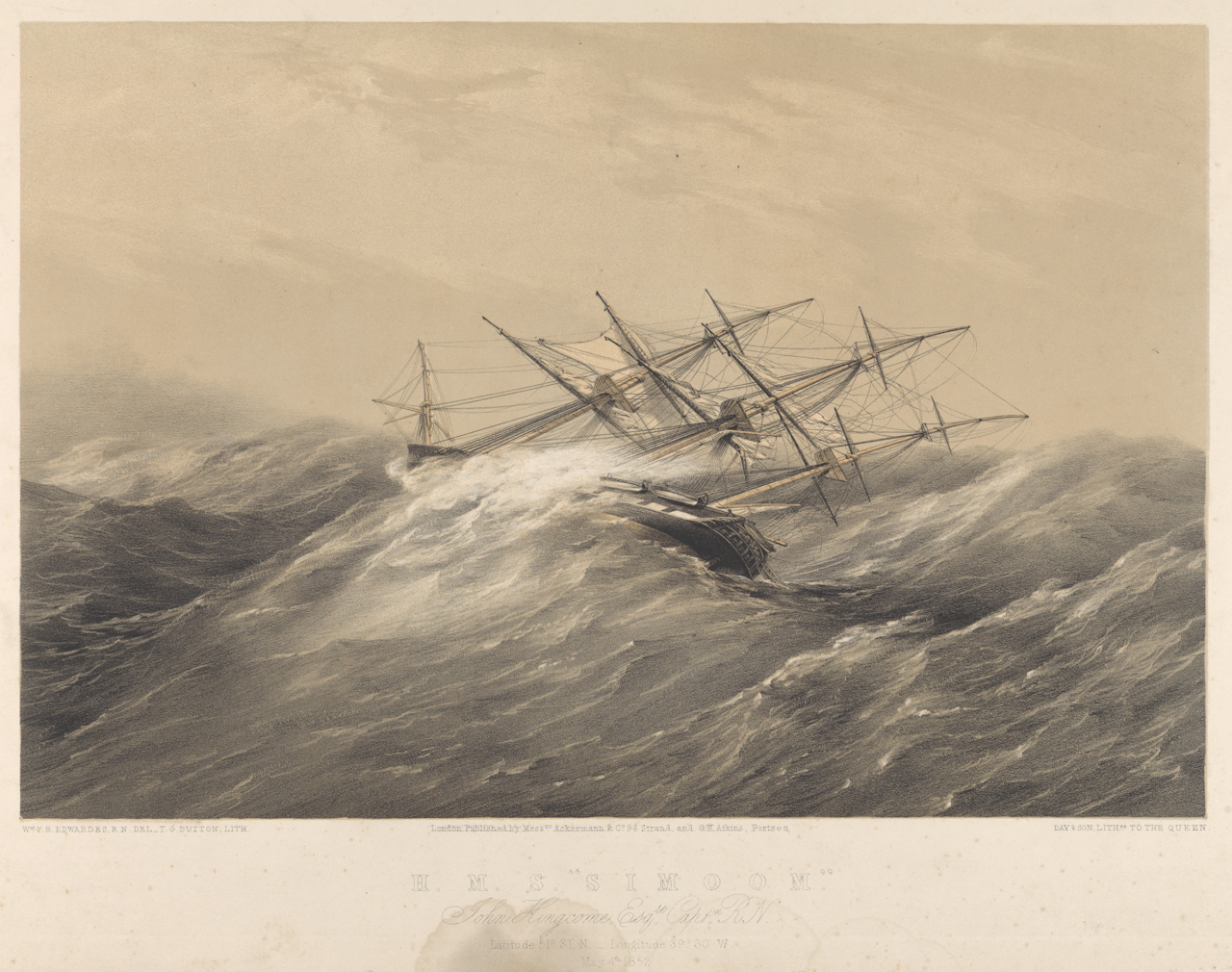
HMS Simoon, John Kingcome, Esq. Captn R.N. Latitude 51o 31'N - Longitude 39o 30W on 4 May 1852

8 May 1852 It is reported in Sydney that the Simoom has been fitted with a ship's cooking galley, which can cook food for a 1,000 men and distill 90 gallons of fresh water from salt water per hour.

1854-55 Crimea

1855 Refitted and re-engined at Portsmouth Dockyard with a 2-cyl, 1,699ihp engine giving 11.589kts. Her original Napier engine was fitted to the first rate, screw ship of the line, Duke of Wellington.

25 May 1855 Kertch and Yenikale (Crimea) were captured, along with thousands of tons and coal and provisions, along with factories etc., by some 60 French and British vessels, and allied troops, for which no prize money appeared to be payable, contrary to the Queen's instructions. See Hansard for more details, and approval for a Parliamentary Grant in lieu.

1959-61 Trooping to the Far East.

24 Mar 1860 Arrived Hongkong from Portsmouth.

23 May 1860 Hongkong.

23 Jun 1860 At the North.

26 Jul 1860 Gulf of Pecheli.

16 Nov 1860 At the North.

31 Dec 1860 Hongkong.

15 Feb 1861 Canton River.

1 May 1861 Hongkong.

28 Jul 1861 At the North.

12 Aug 1861 Shanghai.

28 Aug 1861 At the North.

1 Nov 1861 Hongkong.

4 Nov 1861 Departed Hongkong for England.

26 January 1869 Arrived at Kingstown, Ireland, with the 2nd Battalion 16th Regiment on board, back from Barbados.

1 Jan 1870 Salvage services rendered to the General de Stuers, which subsequently qualified for the payment of salvage monies.

24 Dec 1873 Departed Ascension for the Cape Coast Castle.

1873-74 Ashantee.

9 Jan 1874 Departed Cape Coast Castle. Is reported to have been to Cape Palmas to recruit Kroomen, but they are reported to be reluctant to serve on RN vessels during the current Ashanti War.

18 Jan 1874 Arrived Freetown, Sierra Leone, from the Cape Coast.

29 Jan 1874 In quarantine at St. Vincent.

1879 Devonport. Officers borne in Indus.

1887 Paid Off (Scrapped).

== Legacy ==
Simoom Sound, a former steamer landing (now post office) in the Broughton Archipelago on the Central Coast of British Columbia, Canada was named for the Royal Navy HMS Simoom, under the command of Captain John Kingcome, namesake of the nearby fjord Kingcome Inlet, Rear Admiral of the Pacific Station 1863-1864.
