= Kingcome, British Columbia =

Settlement in British Columbia, Canada

Coordinates: 50°58′00″N 126°11′00″W

Kingcome, also known as Okwunalis or Ukwana'lis is an unincorporated settlement in the Kingcome Inlet area of the Central Coast of British Columbia, Canada, located a few kilometres up the Kingcome River (known as Gwa'yi in Kwak'wala) from the head of the inlet. Quaee Indian Reserve No. 7 is the Indian reserve containing the village.

It is the home of one of the four tribes of the Dzawada’enuxw (Tsawataineuk) subgroup of the Kwakwaka'wakw and was in the past site of a large cannery. It is the setting for the book I Heard the Owl Call My Name.

== See also ==
- List of canneries in British Columbia
- Kingcome (disambiguation)
- List of Kwakwaka'wakw villages
