= John Kingcome =

Admiral Sir John Kingcome KCB
- Born: 14 February 1793
- Died: 7 August 1871 (aged 78)
- Military career
- Allegiance: United Kingdom
- Branch: Royal Navy
- Service years: 1808 – 1869
- Rank: Admiral
- Commands: HMS Belleisle; HMS Simoom; HMS St George; HMS Royal William; Pacific Station
- Conflicts: Napoleonic Wars; First Anglo-Burmese War; First Opium War; Crimean War
- Awards: Knight Commander of the Order of the Bath

Admiral Sir John Kingcome, KCB (14 February 1793 – 7 August 1871) was a Royal Navy officer who went on to be Commander-in-Chief, Pacific Station.

== Naval career ==
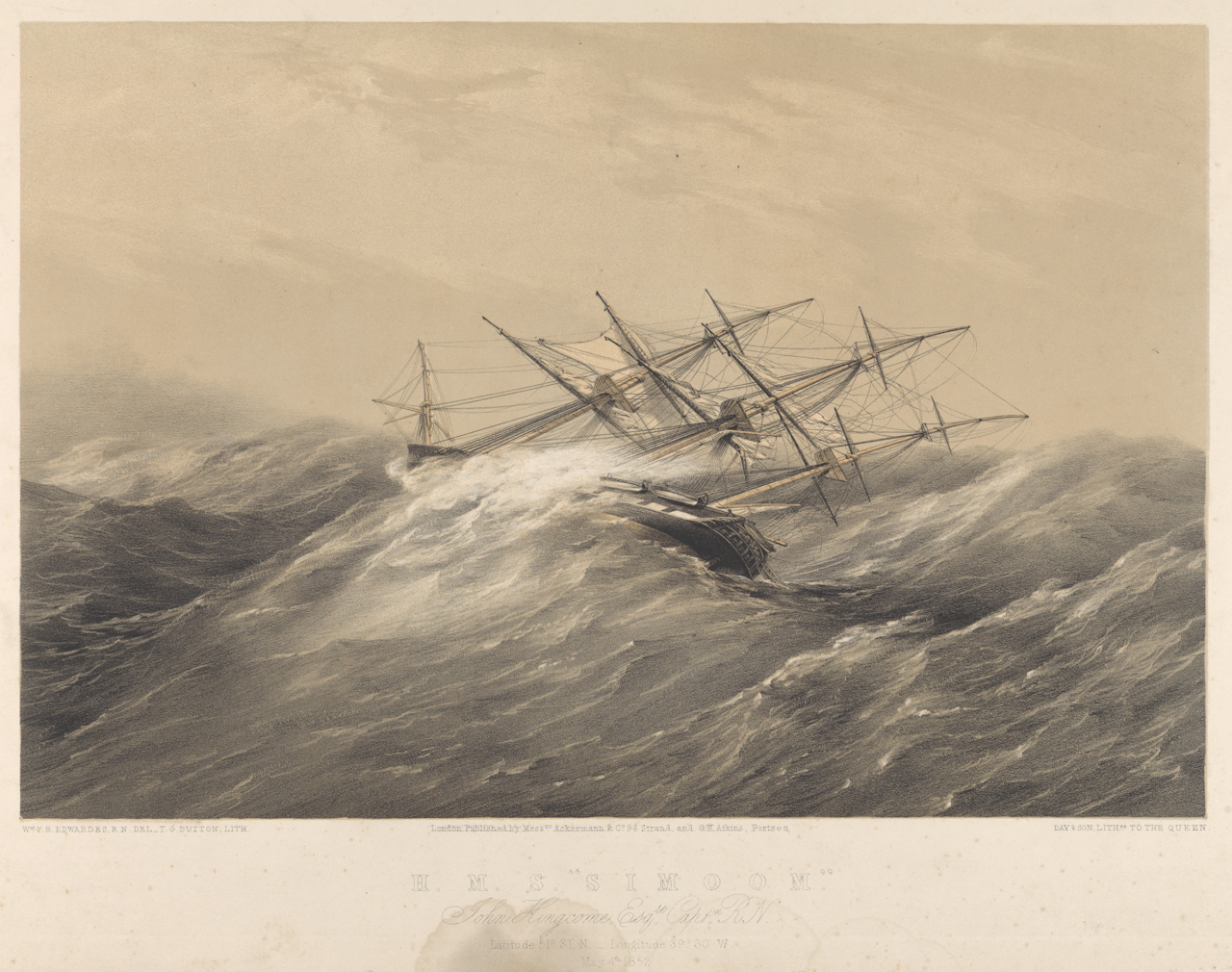
HMS Simoon, John Kingcome, Esq. Captain R.N. Latitude 51° 31'N - Longitude 39° 30'W 4 May 1852

Kingcome joined the Royal Navy in 1808 and was present at the destruction of the French ships during the Battle of the Basque Roads the following year. He also served in the First Anglo-Burmese War from 1824 to 1826.

Promoted to captain in 1838, he commanded HMS Belleisle during the First Opium War in 1841. He later took charge of HMS Simoom and HMS St George and then commanded HMS Royal William in the Baltic Sea during the Crimean War. He was promoted to rear-admiral of the blue in 1857, and advanced to rear-admiral of the white in 1860, and to the red in 1863. He was appointed Commander-in-Chief, Pacific Station in 1862, promoted to rear-admiral in 1864, and appointed a Knight Commander of the Order of the Bath (KCB) in 1865. He was placed on the retired list in 1866 and was made full admiral on the retired list in 1869.

Kingcome Inlet on the British Columbia Coast is named after him as are other placenames in the area.

== See also ==
- Kingcome (disambiguation)

Military offices
| Preceded by Sir Thomas Maitland | Commander-in-Chief, Pacific Station; 1862–1864 | Succeeded by Sir Henry Denham |
