= Hoeya Sound =

Bay in British Columbia, Canada

Coordinates: 50°41′52″N 125°58′35″W

Hoeya Sound is a small sound or bay on the north side of Knight Inlet on the Central Coast of British Columbia, Canada, just east of Lull Bay. The Kwakwaka'wakw villages of igisbalis and Nalakglala were located on the sound, the former just behind Hoeya Head, the point on the south side of the entrance to the sound, the latter at its head.
