= Kingdom Come, Kentucky =

Unincorporated community in Kentucky, United States

- Unincorporated community
- Location in Kentucky Location in the United States
- Coordinates: 37°4′49″N 82°52′49″W
- Country: United States
- State: Kentucky
- County: Letcher
- Elevation: 1,220 ft (370 m)
- Time zone: UTC-5 (Eastern (EST))
  - Summer (DST): UTC-4 (EDT)
- GNIS feature ID: 2336138

Kingdom Come is an unincorporated community in Letcher County, Kentucky, United States.

The name was likely taken from the Lord's Prayer.
