= Hata, Nagano =

Hata 波田
- Former municipality
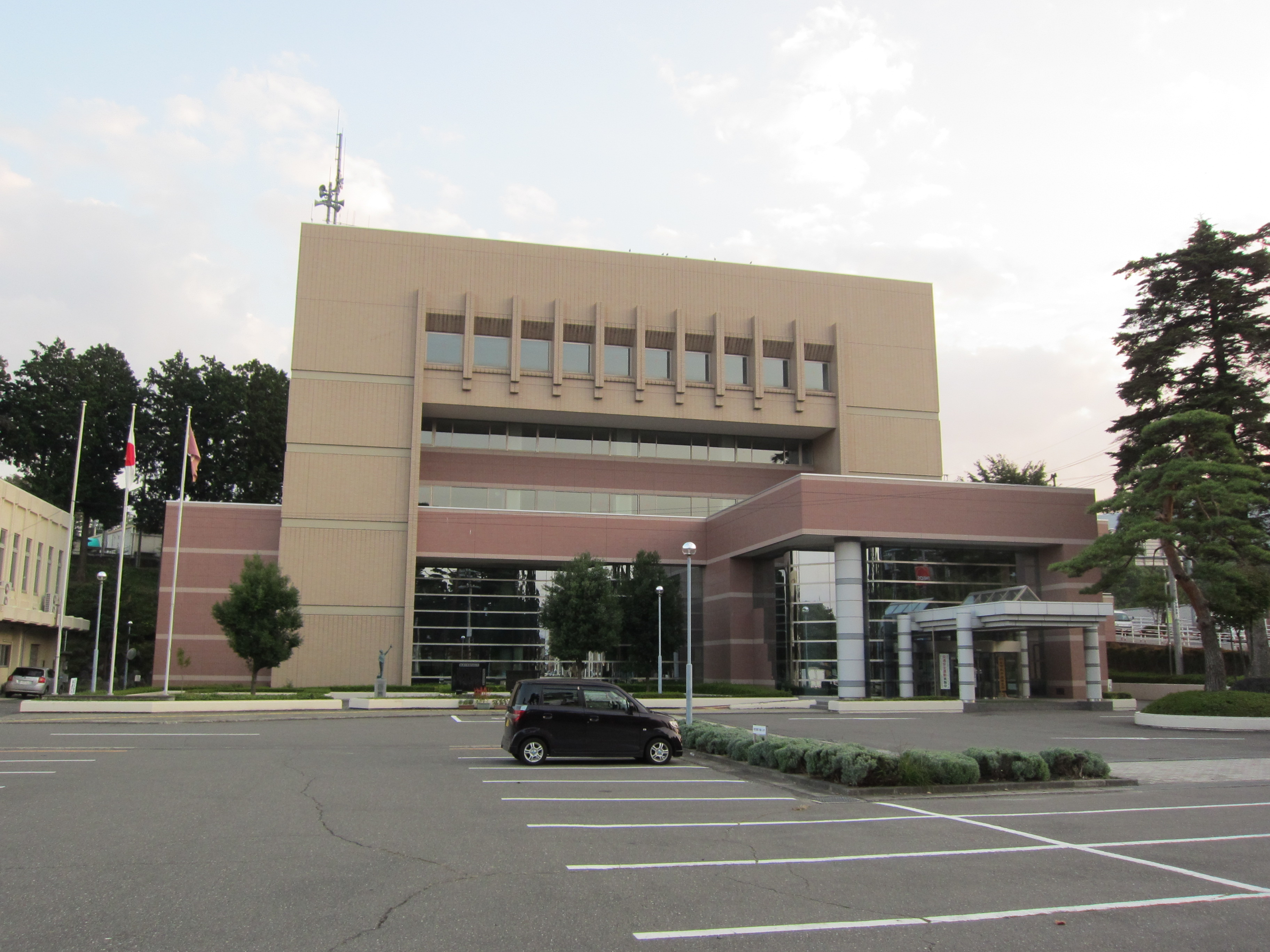
- former Hata town hall

- Location of Hata in Nagano

- Location in Japan
- Coordinates: 36°12′N 137°51′E
- Country: Japan
- Region: Chūbu
- Prefecture: Nagano
- District: Higashichikuma
- Merged: 31 March 2010 (now part of Matsumoto)

Area
  - Total: 59.42 km^{2} (22.94 sq mi)

Population (2007)
  - Total: 15,256
  - Density: 256.75/km^{2} (665.0/sq mi)
- Time zone: UTC+09:00 (JST)
- Website: Matsumoto City
- Symbols
- Flower: Azalea
- Tree: Japanese Red Pine Tree

Hata (波田, Hata) was a town located in Higashichikuma District, Nagano Prefecture, Japan. Before Hata became a town, it was three villages: Kami-Hata (上波多), Shimo-Hata (下波多), and Samizo (三溝).

In 1973, these three villages merged into a town under the enforcement of the town system.

On March 31, 2010, Hata (波田町; -machi) was merged into the expanded city Matsumoto.

Originally, Hata was written as 波多 (Hata) in kanji. 波 means "wave" and 多 means "much". The name meant "many waves", reflecting the abundance of clean water the town had. In 1932, the name was changed from 波多 to the current 波田. 田 means "rice paddies" and reflected the town's hope for abundant water and rice cultivation. Hata's main industry is farming and produces various vegetables and fruits, including watermelons, corn, apples, peaches, and so on. Hata is built on a river terrace. The town's slogan is "A Fascinating Town on a River Terrace" reflects this.

Hata is considered the gateway to Kamikōchi and the Northern Japan Alps because of Shin-Shimashima Station, which is used by tourists to access the park.

== Geography ==
Hata sits on the left bank of the Azusagawa River on a river terrace, 700 meters above sea level.

== History ==
Hata was made up of small communities in the Jōmon period. Many artifacts from stone masks to remains of houses from that period have been found in archaeological digs in Hata and have been displayed in the Tokyo National Museum.

Local tradition recalls a large flood which caused enormous damage to Hata in the early Edo period. During the cleanup, snake bones were found in the mud. The bones were enshrined to give thanks that the flood had killed all the snakes.

In the beginning of the Meiji Period, some students from Nyakutakuji helped start the Industrial Revolution in Japan. They also helped Hata become a modern town by constructing an irrigation channel and inventing a spinning machine. After that, Hata started rice production and other agriculture as well as a silk industry.

In 2007, Asian black bears entered Hata, in search of food. Crops of local farmers suffered a lot of damage. Between 10 and 15 bears were caught using mustard spray, and then the bears were returned to the mountains. The bears were tracked with radar tracking technology, and follow-up surveys were conducted. Bears continue to enter Hata, due to dwindling food supplies in their habitats.

=== Nyakutakuji Temple ===
It is said that Nyakutakuji Temple was founded by Gyoki (668-749) a Buddhist priest between 749 and 758, in the Nara period. During the Edo period, Nyakutakuji Temple was given ten koku of territory (koku is a denomination of land) by the feudal lord of Matsumoto, so its perimeter was about 13 kilometers and it established five branch temples. The temple prospered until the late Edo Period, and the famous author, Jippensha Ikku, stopped there. The temple prospered and was considered the "Nikkō of the Hida District".

A small sub-temple, Tamura Temple, was built in the Muromachi period and enshrined the famous conquest of the Ezo by shōgun Sakanoue no Tamuramaro.

During the Meiji Era however, the Japanese government passed policies which popularized Shinto (the native Japanese religion of nature worship) and boycotted Buddhism. Thus the Nyakutakuji Temple was destroyed in 1871, leaving only the small sub-temples. Later, people tried to rebuild the temple, but they failed because of lack of support. Some of the buildings that remained were transferred to different locations, and now all that remains is a stone fence. Among the Nyakutakuji Temple Ruins, there is a Japanese cedar called Shinobu-suji. Local legend says that this tree can hear a couple's secret wish for marriage.

=== Deva Kings ===
Saikoji Temple, one of the sub-temples of Nakutakuji Temple, held two Deva Kings, or guardians of the temple. They were made during the Kamakura Period. Now, the statues are located next to Kami-Hata Shrine, though they are not attached to the shrine itself, for the Deva Kings are of Buddhist origin while the shrine is Shinto. The statues were sculpted by Myokai, a monk of Zenkoji Temple. After completing the statues, Myokai inscribed his name on them. It was rare for a sculptor of Buddhist images to do this. The statues are 256 cm tall and made from Japanese cypress.

During the Edo Period, the Japanese government destroyed many temples all over Japan in order to promote the national religion of Shinto. The government destroyed Saikoji Temple, but the Deva Kings were hidden and so escaped destruction.

== Services ==
Health Care

Hata is served by one general hospital, Hata Sogo Hospital (松本市立波田総合病院). The hospital also serves patients from the surrounding area.

Senior Services

Chikumano is the local senior care home and also houses a welfare office. The home offers health examinations and other care services.

Community Centers

Hata has two community event facilities. The first is Chuou Kouminkan (Central Community Center) for culture and study. Over sixty culture clubs covering art, history, cooking, language, etc. meet there. The second is Jouhou Bunka Center (Information and Cultural Center), which houses Hata's media center and public library.

Act Hall

Located next to public library is Act Hall, the local stage space for dramas, lectures and music concerts. Built in 1995, it can seat about 310 people. The Hall also offers practice rooms (band, dance, etc.) available to rent by the hour (charges range from 500 to 900 yen depending upon the hour). In 2009, the Japanese world-famous pianist Kumamoto Mari, held a piano concert here.

In Act Hall, there is a Bosendorfer piano. It is one of the most famous models of piano. "Piano Carnival" is held once a year in Hata. This piano concert opens the Bosendorfer to local citizens. However, from 2011, whether it will be held or not is still unknown because of the merger with Matsumoto City.

Recreation

Hata has a number of parks, a sports gym, tennis courts, and an indoor pool.

== Hot Springs ==
Ryujima Hot Spring "Seseragi no Yu"

There is a small hot spring in Hata called Ryujima Onsen (Dragon Island Hot Spring). It is located in the far west of Hata. If you travel on Route 158 towards Kamikōchi, you will see a sign for it on the left. Past the signboard, turn left and go across a long narrow bridge which spans the Azusagawa River. The onsen itself is located on the sandbank of the Azusagawa River and is surrounded by beautiful nature. The hot spring was first dug in 1997, and opened to the public in 2000.

There are both inside and outside baths available at Ryujima Onsen. The inside bath is a stone bubble bath, while outside the bath is made from Japanese cypress. There is a private garden that the baths look out upon. The spring water is valued by visitors for relieving nerve and muscle pain, stiff shoulders, paralysis, and fatigue, as a result of its clouded and thick quality. The baths also attract visitors due to its proximity to mountain views and the Azusagawa River.

Outside the baths, there is a casual restaurant and a large resting room. Free barely tea was available to enjoy after your bath. Now there is only hot water served (May 2014).

Cost: ¥510 (adults), ¥250 (children)

For more information about hot spring culture see Onsen.

== Education ==
Hata has four nursery schools that enroll preschool age children. Hata has one elementary school, Hata Elementary School (松本市立波田小学校), one junior high school, Hata Junior High School (松本市立波田中学校), and one high school, Azusagawa High School (長野県立梓川高校).

In 1935, Nakata Yoshikazu, a practical science teacher at Hata Secondary School planted the first apple trees in Hata in the school's garden. Because the cultivation of apples went well, it spawned a large apple industry in Hata.

In 2006, Hata Elementary School students helped to design the town's summer festival's fireworks display.

== Industry and Agriculture ==
Hata mainly serves as a bedroom community to Matsumoto City; however, it does have a few precision factories including Miyaji Iron Works, which contributed iron frames to structures such as the Tokyo Metropolitan Government Building and the Great Seto Bridge.

Hata's agriculture consists of many temperate climate fruits including apples, pears, and peaches.

=== Watermelons ===
The watermelons of Hata have been rated the best in Japan due to their sweetness, size, and juiciness by Japan Agricultural Cooperatives. Highly prized, the watermelons are the subject of three different town festivals and are shipped throughout Japan during late July/early August each year where they command a high price. The local climate and regional soil make Hata an ideal place to grow watermelons.

==== History ====
In 1935, people began to grow watermelons in Shimohara (a region of Hata). By 1950, Shimohara watermelons already had a great reputation in Matsumoto and were famous in the surrounding areas. Around 1960 the most common variety of watermelon was "Kyokuto." In the mid-1960s, trucks became widespread and farmers could bring their watermelons directly to vegetable and fruit markets.

In 1981, Hata Town received 300 million yen in subsidies from the government to build a watermelon distribution center. From then on, all union members began to mark their watermelons with the brand Shimohara.

Now farmers in the town, without going through the cooperatives to market, use direct sales, but sales are limited to facilities operating in cooperation with "Shimohara Watermelon." Watermelon farmers in Shimohara learned their cultivation techniques from farmers in the Namiyanagi Region(now a part of Matsumoto City), which was famous for watermelon production.

== People ==
Hatakoshi Rokuza (波多腰六左) (1839–1900) was the headman of Hata Village. He constructed an irrigation channel, "Hata Segi" in Hata in 1871. It was built with great difficulty. The success of the irrigation channel allowed agriculture in Hata to flourish.

Gaun Tacchi (臥雲辰致) (1842–1900) was born in the Edo period, he invented the "Gara Bouki" in 1876. Gara Bouki is a cotton spinning machine. This was the greatest invention at the start of the modern cotton fabrics industry in Japan and is said to have started the Industrial Revolution in Japan. Gaun and his invention was supported by Hatakoshi Rokuza and others.

== Local events ==
=== Spring ===
The Deva Kings' Festival

Children crawl between the legs of a Deva King statue for health on the third Saturday and Sunday of April. According to legend, a child who goes between the Deva King's legs was cured of measles. The festival honors that event. Some children cry due to the carved image of the Deva King. Parents usually help out by encouraging their children.

Dogtooth Violets Festival (かたくり祭り)

The Dogtooth Violet Festival is held in the middle of April at Kami-Gaito in the west of Hata. Dogtooth violets are wild flowers which grow in the northern Japanese mountains. They bloom early in April. The flower has six beautiful violet petals. On the leaves, there are unique purple spots. From the roots, people used to make a kind of white starch called "Katakuriko." But nowadays, the starch is made from potatoes instead. Years before the dogtooth violet garden was a mulberry field. The landowners have since protected the wild flowers in the field. Since 1997, the neighborhood has made a sidewalk and taken care of the area. Now, the garden has about 20 kinds of wild flowers and about 30,000 flowers in total. During the festival, which lasts for two weeks, there is a 200 yen entrance fee to the garden.

Weeping Cherry Blossoms

Anyou-ji Temple, located across from the Moriguchi Station on the Kamikōchi train line, is famous for its beautiful cherry trees in spring. Upon the temple grounds there are two dozen weeping cherry trees, two of which are between 300 and 500 years old. During the cherry blossom season, visitors can pay a small fee to enter the temple and enjoy a cup of tea while enjoying the view. But of course, simply walking around the temple grounds is also quite a fulfilling experience. The temple itself belongs to the Jodo Shinshu Honganji sect.

=== Summer ===
Hata Summer Festival (波田さいさい祭)

Hata Sai Sai-Sai is the town's summer festival and most of the town's people participate in it. The festival is held the last Saturday of July every year. It is a harvest festival for Hata's delicious watermelon. The festival is famous for the watermelon that is handed out free of charge.

During the daytime there is a flea market and children's games and sports. The local International Club also hosts a booth for international exchange. In the evening there are food stalls, various live performances by the brass band club from Hata Elementary School, Japanese taiko drumming, ocarina club, and the young men's music club.

At 8:00 PM, there is a fireworks display at the Hata Summer Festival.

=== Fall ===
Fall Harvest Festivals (秋祭り)

In September, three shrines in Hata (San-Shrine, Suwa-Shrine, and Hata-Shrine) have their fall festivals. Festive floats that are decorated with lanterns are paraded through the streets to each shrine.

=== Winter ===
Winter Story

From December to January, the Hata Chamber of Commerce and Industry along with volunteers from the people of Hata decorate the area around Hata Station with a Christmas tree made from plastic bottles and Christmas lights.

== Features ==
Lovers’ Hill Salad Market is named after Lovers’ Cape in the town of Toi, Shizuoka Prefecture, which was Hata Town's sister town, before the merger with Matsumoto City.

Some local people believe there is a ghost in Hata. The ghost of a child sometimes appears around Akamatsu Ground near Shin-Shimashima Station. Some people say the ghost wears an orange shirt. Only children playing baseball on the ground have seen it. Locals attribute the ghost to a girl who drowned in the Azusa River.
