= Port Stephens =

Port Stephens may refer to:

- Port Stephens Council (also known simply as Port Stephens), New South Wales, Australia
- Port Stephens, Falkland Islands
- Port Stephens (New South Wales), a natural harbour in Australia
- Electoral district of Port Stephens, New South Wales, Australia
