= Gods of War (Manowar album) =

2007 studio album by Manowar

- Cover art by Ken Kelly

Studio album by Manowar
- Released: February 23, 2007
- Genre: Heavy metal, symphonic power metal, spoken word
- Length: 73:43
- Label: Magic Circle Music
- Producer: Joey DeMaio

Manowar chronology
The Sons of Odin (2006)	Gods of War (2007)	Gods of War Live (2007)

Professional ratings
Review scores
Source	Rating
AllMusic	2.5/5 stars
About.com	3/5 stars
Sputnikmusic	3/5 stars

Gods of War is the tenth album by heavy metal band Manowar, released in 2007. It is a concept album centered on Odin, King of Gods and primary god of war in the Norse Mythology. Gods of War was supposed to be the first of a series of concept albums dedicated to different war gods from various mythologies, but eventually its sequels were not released.

All the text on the booklet was written in the Runic alphabet. The booklet is available for download in the official Manowar site. Cover art is painted by Ken Kelly. It is the last studio album to feature Manowar drummer Scott Columbus, who died in 2011.

Music of the album features symphonic metal influence, such as use of keyboard, choir and symphonic orchestra. Its close relationship with the four-opera cycle of Der Ring des Nibelungen by Richard Wagner is intended by wagnerian DeMaio, as shown by the booklet and recent interviews with Michael Custodis.

== Track listing ==
All songs written by Joey DeMaio, except where noted.

No.	Title	Writer(s)	Length
1.	"Overture to the Hymn of the Immortal Warriors" (Instrumental)		6:19
2.	"The Ascension"		2:30
3.	"King of Kings"		4:18
4.	"Army of the Dead, Part I"		1:58
5.	"Sleipnir"	Karl Logan, DeMaio	5:13
6.	"Loki God of Fire"		3:50
7.	"Blood Brothers"		4:54
8.	"Overture to Odin" (Instrumental)		3:41
9.	"The Blood of Odin"		3:57
10.	"The Sons of Odin"		6:23
11.	"Glory Majesty Unity"		4:41
12.	"Gods of War"		7:26
13.	"Army of the Dead, Part II"		2:20
14.	"Odin"		5:27
15.	"Hymn of the Immortal Warriors"		5:29
16.	"Die for Metal" (Bonus Track)	Logan, DeMaio	5:17
Total length:			73:43

- "Die for Metal" is a metal anthem present on all copies of the album, but is listed as a bonus track because it is not part of the concept of the album.
- "Die for Metal" is featured in the video game Brütal Legend.

=== Limited edition ===
Besides the normal Jewel Case version, Gods of War was also released as a limited edition in an embossed metal slipcase containing a high-grade media book bound in leather. Furthermore, this limited edition features a bonus DVD with unreleased material about the making of the album and some special behind-the-scenes footage. A double-vinyl LP in a gatefold sleeve was also available.

== Personnel ==
- Eric Adams – vocals
- Karl Logan – guitars, keyboards
- Joey DeMaio – four-string and eight-string bass, piccolo bass, keyboards, engineer, producer
- Scott Columbus – drums, percussion

=== Additional personnel ===
- Joe Rozler – orchestra and choir arrangement

== Charts ==
=== Weekly charts ===
Chart (2007)	Peak position
Austrian Albums (Ö3 Austria)	9
Belgian Albums (Ultratop Wallonia)	62
Finnish Albums (Suomen virallinen lista)	12
French Albums (SNEP)	109
German Albums (Offizielle Top 100)	2
Hungarian Albums (MAHASZ)	3
Italian Albums (FIMI)	35
Japanese Albums (Oricon)	54
Norwegian Albums (VG-lista)	36
Spanish Albums (PROMUSICAE)	85
Swedish Albums (Sverigetopplistan)	17
Swiss Albums (Schweizer Hitparade)	21
UK Rock & Metal Albums (OCC)	7
US Heatseekers Albums (Billboard)	20
US Independent Albums (Billboard)	46

=== Year-end charts ===
Chart (2007)	Peak position
German Albums (Offizzielle Top 100)	66

== Certifications ==
Region	Certification	Certified units/sales
Russia (NFPF)	Gold	10,000^{*}
^{*} Sales figures based on certification alone.
