= Stephens Island (Great Barrier Reef) =

Island in the Great Barrier Reef, Queensland, Australia

- Interactive map of Stephens Island

Geography
- Location: Australia
- Coordinates: 17.738°S 146.160°E

Administration
- Australia

Stephens Island is about 40 km north of Dunk Island. With nearby Sisters Island it forms the South Barnard Islands Group, which is protected within the Barnard Island Group National Park. It is a popular site for tourist kayaking.

The island is part of the South Barnard Islands Important Bird Area, identified as such by BirdLife International because of its importance as a breeding site for terns.

== See also ==
- Stephens Island (Torres Strait)
