= 'Til Kingdom Come =

'Til Kingdom Come may refer to:

- 'Til Kingdom Come (film), 2020 documentary film
- A reference to the Kingdom of God in Christian eschatology
- Idiomatically, hyperbole for "a very long time" or "never"
- "Til Kingdom Come", a song from Up, by Pop Evil
- "Til Kingdom Come", a hidden track by Coldplay from X&Y

== See also ==
- Kingdom Come (disambiguation)
- To Kingdom Come (disambiguation)
