= To Kingdom Come =

To Kingdom Come may refer to:

- To Kingdom Come: The Definitive Collection, a 1989 anthology album by The Band
  - "To Kingdom Come", a 1968 song by The Band from Music from Big Pink
- "To Kingdom Come" (song), a 2008 song by Passion Pit
- "To Kingdom Come", an episode from the animated series Dragon Tales

== See also ==
- Kingdom Come (disambiguation)
- Til Kingdom Come (disambiguation)
