= Hata Station =

Hata Station is the name of two train stations in Japan:

- Hata Station (Nagano) (波田駅)
- Hata Station (Hyōgo) (葉多駅)
