= Ahta Indian Reserve No. 3 =

Indian reserve in British Columbia, Canada

Coordinates: 50°52′00″N 126°10′00″W

Ahta Indian Reserve No. 3, officially Ahta 3, is an Indian reserve on Bond Sound on the Coast of British Columbia, Canada, located at the mouth of the Ahta River. It is under the governance of the Kwikwasut'inuxw Haxwa'mis First Nation and is 7.1 hectares in area.

The reserve is on the site of a former village variously spelled "Hata", "Hada", or "Ahta".

== See also ==
- List of Indian reserves in British Columbia
- List of Kwakwaka'wakw villages
