= Hata Teruo =

Japanese artist

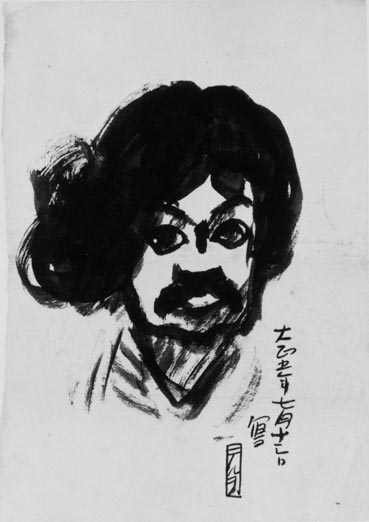
Self-portrait (1917)

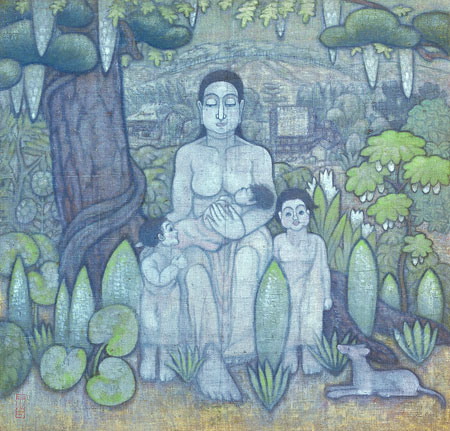
Nest of Compassion

Hata Teruo (Japanese: 秦 テルヲ; 20 March 1887, Hiroshima – 25 December 1945, Kyoto) was a Japanese painter and graphic artist. In his works, he attempted to synthesize the nihonga and yōga styles. Many of his later works have Buddhist themes.

== Life and work ==
His family was apparently Christian. He lost his father at the age of nine, which resulted in straitened economic circumstances. Nevertheless, he was able to graduate from the Municipal School of Arts and Crafts (now the Kyoto City University of Arts); intending to become an industrial designer to support his family. At first, he painted in Kyoto and Kōbe, focusing on scenes from the hard lives of the working poor and their meager living quarters. In 1909, he joined an organization of young painters known as the "Heigo Group", named after one of the Heavenly Stems in the sexagenary cycle, meaning "To Strike".

The following year, he also joined the short-lived "Black Cat Group", founded by Ono Chikkyō, Tsuchida Bakusen and Tsuda Seifū. Following the breakup of that group, he never joined any others. In 1913, together with Nonagase Banka, he established the "Banka-Teruo Exhibition" in Kyoto, as a protest against the official government exhibition.

After 1914 he led a restless life, living in Osaka, Kōbe and Tokyo, where he painted bleak industrial scenes and graphic portraits of prostitutes. Following a serious illness in 1919, he got married and when his first child was born, in 1921, he settled in the village of Kamo. At that time, he became interested in the works of Paul Gauguin and began to create paintings with Buddhist themes, having become disillusioned with Christianity. In 1929, he moved into central Kyoto. During the Pacific War he focused on small drawings; mostly with a melancholy content.

He is now remembered largely for his idiosyncratic portrayals of mothers and their children.

== Sources ==
- "Hata Teruo" In: Kyōto no Nihonga 1910–1930, (exhibition catalog) National Museum of Modern Art, Kyoto, 1986. ISBN 4-87642-117-X.
- Laurance P. Roberts: "Hata Teruo". In: A Dictionary of Japanese Artists. Weatherhill, 1976. ISBN 0-8348-0113-2.
