= Dzawada̱ʼenux̱w First Nation =

First Nations government in British Columbia, Canada

The Dzawada̱ʼenux̱w First Nation, formerly Tsawataineuk, is a First Nations band government in the Queen Charlotte Strait region north of northern Vancouver Island in the Canadian province of British Columbia. It is a member of the Musgamagw Dzawadaʼenuxw Tribal Council, along with the Gwawaenuk Tribe and the Ḵwiḵwa̱sutʼinux̱w Ha̱xwaʼmis First Nation.

The territory of the Dzawada̱ʼenux̱w First Nation spans the whole of Broughton Archipelago on the northern side of Queen Charlotte Strait and adjoining areas of the BC mainland. The main village of the Dzawada̱ʼenux̱w people is GwaʼYi, at the mouth of the Kingcome River.

As of November 2007, there were 59 people living in the community.

== See also ==
- Kingcome Inlet, British Columbia
- Kingcome, British Columbia
- Queen Charlotte Strait
- Kwakwaka'wakw
- Kwak'wala (language)
