= Kingcome Inlet, British Columbia =

Locality in British Columbia, Canada

Coordinates: 50°57′00″N 126°12′00″W

Location of Kingcome Inlet in British Columbia

Kingcome Inlet is a locality on the Central Coast region of British Columbia, located on the inlet of the same name.

== See also ==
- List of Kwakwaka'wakw villages
