= Kwatsi Bay =

Bay in British Columbia, Canada

Kwatsi Bay is a bay on the North American mainland of British Columbia, Canada. It is just north of Gilford Island on the north side of Tribune Channel. At the head of the bay was its namesake, kwatsi, a former village of the Kwicksutaineuk group of the Kwakwaka'wakw peoples. Kwatsi Point is the headland at the southeast corner of the bay, located at 50°50′37″N 126°15′40″W.

Kwatsi Bay is approximately 70 nautical miles (130 km) by air from the Pacific Ocean. It is a popular destination for pleasure boaters.
