= Barnard Island Group National Park =

National park in Queensland, Australia

- IUCN category II (national park)
- Location within Queensland
- Location: Queensland
- Coordinates: 17°40′29″S 146°10′22″E
- Area: 60 ha (150 acres)
- Established: 1994
- Governing body: Queensland Parks and Wildlife Service

The Barnard Island Group is a protected area in the Cassowary Coast Region, Queensland, Australia.

These are islands with a geological past dating back 420 million years.

Six species of terns have been found nesting in the southern Barnard Islands, and twenty-three species of forest birds have a habitat here.

== Geography ==
The park is 1,296 km (805 mi) northwest of Brisbane. Islands within the group include Jessie Island and Kent Island.

== See also ==
- Protected areas of Queensland
