= Karl Logan =

American guitarist (born 1965)

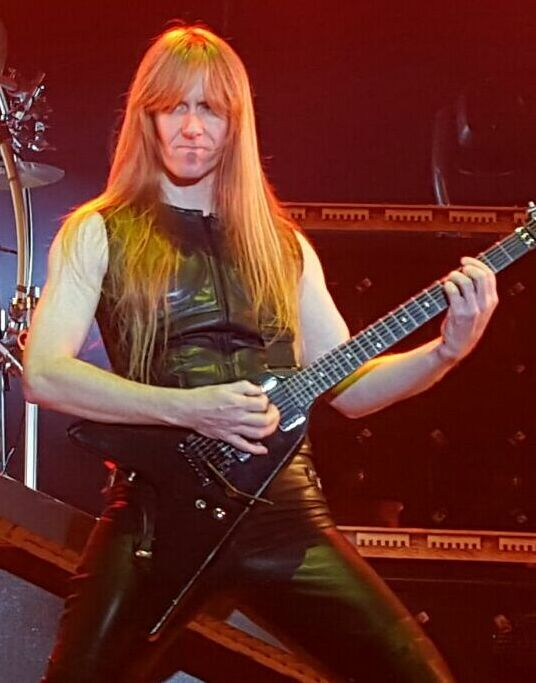
- Logan performing with Manowar in 2016

Background information
- Born: Karl Mozeleski; April 28, 1965 (age 61); Carbondale, Pennsylvania, U.S.
- Genres: Heavy metal, power metal
- Occupation: Musician
- Instruments: Guitar, keyboards
- Years active: 1994–2018
- Formerly of: Manowar

Karl Mozeleski (born April 28, 1965), known by his stage name Karl Logan, is an American former musician who was the guitarist for heavy metal band Manowar from 1994 to 2018. In 2022, he was convicted of possession of child pornography.

== Biography ==
Logan graduated Lakeland High School near Clifford, Pennsylvania in 1982. He joined Manowar in 1994 after local band gigs in northeastern Pennsylvania with Arc Angel (which also featured a post-Twisted Sister A. J. Pero on drums for a while) and Fallen Angel featuring Ed Collins.

Logan relates in Hell on Earth Part I how he met Joey DeMaio by almost running him over with his motorcycle, which is how the two hit it off.

Logan is a fan of dirt biking. In 2006, he suffered an arm injury which delayed Manowar's "Demons, Dragons and Warriors" tour and the release of the band's new album Gods of War. According to sources the injury was so severe that "it could have resulted in permanent nerve damage, ending his musical career", however Logan recovered and subsequently played with the band.

Logan released a line of custom designed guitars which were sold through Manowar's website. In 2009, Logan accepted a limited number of students for one-to-one guitar lessons over Skype.

== Legal issues ==
On August 9, 2018, Logan was arrested in Charlotte, North Carolina for allegedly possessing child pornography and was charged with six counts of third-degree exploitation of a minor. His bail was set at $35,000, which he had since bonded out. Manowar issued a statement shortly after saying that he would not perform with them on their last world tour. Evidence revealed that Logan was in possession of several videos depicting young girls between ages 4 and 12 years old being engaged in a variety of sexual acts with unidentified men. According to arrest warrants, the offenses took place between June 18 and August 2, 2018.

His attorney Brad Smith said that he was "extremely cooperative with the investigation from the beginning, and he'll continue to do that." Logan faced at least 25 years in prison for admitting in a federal courtroom that he had downloaded and kept the explicit material in his possession. He was sentenced to 5 and a half years in prison on July 15, 2022, for possessing the material as a result.

Logan was released on the 17th of July 2026.
