= Kingcome Inlet =

Fjord on the coast of British Columbia, Canada

Coordinates: 50°57′00″N 126°12′00″W

Kingcome Inlet is one of the lesser principal fjords of the British Columbia Coast, north and east of Broughton Island. It is sixth in sequence of the major saltwater fjords north from the 49th parallel near Vancouver and similar in width, on average 2.5 km (1.6 mi), to longer inlets such as Knight Inlet and Bute Inlet, but it is only 35 km (22 mi) in length from the mouth of the Kingcome River to Sutlej Channel, which ultimately connects around Broughton Island to the main regional waterway of the Queen Charlotte Strait. Kingcome Inlet has a short side inlet, Wakeman Sound, fed by the Wakeman River.

The area is the territory of the Kwakwakaʼwakw peoples. At the mouth of Kingcome Inlet is the Broughton Archipelago, a wild array of small islands that form a marine park west of Gilford Island, the largest of the hundreds of islands. It is home to the Ḵwiḵwa̱sut'inux̱w Ha̱xwa'mis First Nation. The village and former cannery site of Kingcome, further up the river, is the territory of the Dzawada̱ʼenux̱w First Nation.

== Name origin ==
Kingcome Inlet was named for Captain John Kingcome of the troopship HMS Simoom, later knighted, who was Rear Admiral in charge of the Pacific Station of the Royal Navy from 1863 to 1864 and whose flagship was HMS Sutlej.

== See also ==
- Kingcome Glacier
- Kingcome (disambiguation)
