= Manowar discography =

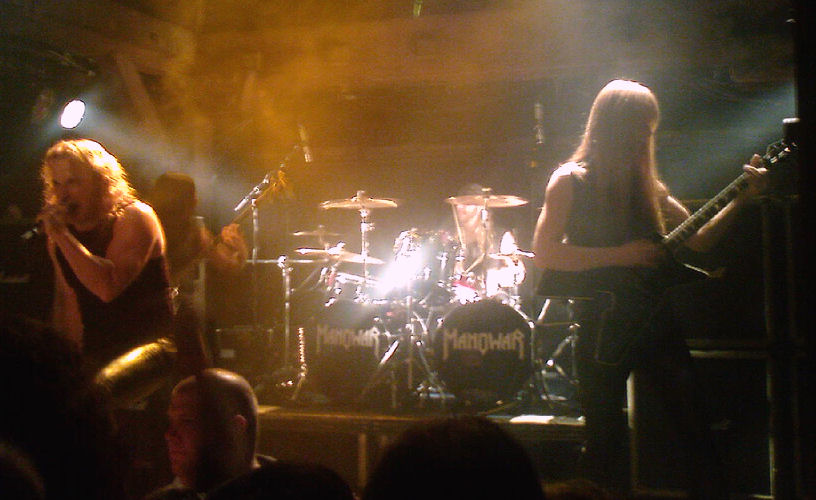
- Manowar performing in 2007
- Studio albums: 11
- Extended plays: 6
- Live albums: 3
- Compilation albums: 4
- Singles: 21
- Video albums: 9
- Re-recorded albums: 2

The following is a comprehensive discography of Manowar, an American heavy metal band from New York, founded in 1980 by Joey DeMaio, Ross "The Boss" Friedman, and Eric Adams. It includes thirteen studio albums, six EPs, and various other media. As of 2023, Manowar has sold more than 30 million records worldwide.

== Studio albums ==
Title	Album details	Peak chart positions											Sales	Certifications
Title	Album details	AUT	BEL	SWI	FIN	FRA	GER	HUN	JPN	NOR	SWE	UK	Sales	Certifications
Battle Hymns	Released: June 7, 1982; Label: Liberty Records; Formats: CD, LP, CS, DL	—	—	—	—	—	—	—	—	—	—	—		
Into Glory Ride	Released: July 1, 1983; Label: Megaforce Records; Formats: CD, LP, CS, DL	—	—	—	—	—	—	—	—	—	—	—		
Hail to England	Released: February 4, 1984; Label: Music For Nations; Formats: CD, LP, CS, DL	—	—	—	—	—	—	—	—	—	—	83		
Sign of the Hammer	Released: October 15, 1984; Label: 10 Records; Formats: CD, LP, CS, DL	—	—	—	—	—	—	—	—	—	34	73		
Fighting the World	Released: February 17, 1987; Label: Atco Records; Formats: CD, LP, CS, DL	—	—	—	15	—	—	—	—	—	27	—	GER: 250,000+	GER: Gold
Kings of Metal	Released: November 18, 1988; Label: Atlantic Records; Formats: CD, LP, CS, DL	—	—	—	20	—	37	—	—	—	45	—	GER: 250,000+	GER: Gold
The Triumph of Steel	Released: September 29, 1992; Label: Atlantic Records; Formats: CD, LP, CS, DL	—	—	20	22	—	8	—	68	—	—	—	GER: 250,000+; US: 87,580+	GER: Gold
Louder Than Hell	Released: April 29, 1996; Label: Geffen Records; Formats: CD, LP, CS, DL	16	—	24	11	—	7	—	93	—	22	—	US: 34,734+	
Warriors of the World	Released: July 4, 2002; Label: Nuclear Blast; Formats: CD, SACD, LP, CS, DL	6	—	35	17	40	2	32	55	14	13	—	GER: 150,000+	GER: Gold
Gods of War	Released: February 23, 2007; Label: Magic Circle Music; Formats: CD, LP, DL	9	62	21	12	109	2	3	54	36	17	163	RUS: 10,000+	RUS: Gold
The Lord of Steel	Released: June 16, 2012; Label: Magic Circle Music; Formats: CD, LP, DL	37	121	—	20	—	19	—	—	40	41	—		
"—" denotes a recording that did not chart or was not released in that territory.

=== Re-recorded albums ===
Title	Album details	Peak chart positions
Title	Album details	GER
Battle Hymns MMXI	Released: November 26, 2010; Label: Magic Circle Music; Formats: CD, LP, DL	—
Kings of Metal MMXIV	Released: February 7, 2014; Label: Magic Circle Music; Formats: CD, LP, DL	55
Hail to England (MMXIX Imperial Edition)	Released: March 29, 2019	
Into Glory Ride (MMXIX Imperial Edition)	Released: March 29, 2019	
"—" denotes a recording that did not chart or was not released in that territory.

== Live albums ==
Title	Album details	Peak chart positions		Sales
Title	Album details	AUT	GER	Sales
Hell on Wheels	Released: November 18, 1997; Label: BMG; Formats: CD, LP, CS, DL	—	37	US: 2,875+
Hell on Stage	Released: April 20, 1999; Label: Metal Blade Records; Formats: CD, LP, CS, DL	50	18	US: 10,423+
Gods of War Live	Released: July 6, 2007; Label: Magic Circle Music; Formats: CD, LP, DL	69	—	
"—" denotes a recording that did not chart or was not released in that territory.

== Compilation albums ==
Title	Album details	Peak chart positions	
Title	Album details	AUT	GER
Manowar Kills	Released: 1992; Label: Atlantic Records; Formats: CD	—	—
The Hell of Steel: Best of Manowar	Released: 1994; Label: Atlantic Records; Formats: CD, LP, CS	33	29
Anthology	Released: 1997; Label: Connoisseur Collection; Formats: CD	—	—
The Kingdom of Steel	Released: 1998; Label: MCA Records; Formats: CD	—	100
Steel Warriors	Released: 1998; Label: MCA Records; Formats: CD	—	—
"—" denotes a recording that did not chart or was not released in that territory.

== EPs ==
Title	Album details	Peak chart positions
Title	Album details	GER
The Dawn of Battle	Released: November 18, 2002; Label: Nuclear Blast; Formats: CD, LP, DualDisc	—
The Sons of Odin	Released: October 6, 2006; Label: Magic Circle Music; Formats: CD, CD+DVD, DL	—
Thunder in the Sky	Released: July 17, 2009; Label: Magic Circle Music; Formats: CD, DL	28
The Lord of Steel Live	Released: July 9, 2013; Label: Magic Circle Entertainment; Formats: CD, DL	—
The Final Battle I	Released: March 29, 2019; Label: Magic Circle Entertainment	36
Highlights from the Revenge of Odysseus	Released: June 23, 2022; Label: Magic Circle Entertainment	—
"—" denotes a recording that did not chart or was not released in that territory.

== Singles ==
- "Defender" (1983)
- "All Men Play on 10" (1984)
- "Blow Your Speakers" (1987)
- "Herz Aus Stahl" "(Heart Of Steel)" (1988)
- "Metal Warriors" (1992)
- "Defender" (remixed) (1993)
- "Return of the Warlord" (1996)
- "Courage" (1996)
- "Courage Live" (1996)
- "Number 1" (1996)
- "Live in Spain" (1998)
- "Live in Portugal" (1998)
- "Live in France" (1998)
- "Live in Germany" (1998)
- "Warriors of the World United" (2002) – GER #27, NOR #48, SWE #50
- "An American Trilogy" / "The Fight for Freedom" (2002)
- "The Dawn of Battle" (2002)
- "King of Kings" (2005)
- "Thunder in the Sky" (2009)
- "Laut Und Hart Stark Und Schnell" (2023)

== Video albums ==
Title	Album details	Peak chart positions	
Title	Album details	GER	FIN
Secrets of Steel	Released: 1997; Label: Geffen Records; Formats: CD+VHS	—	—
Hell on Earth Part I	Released: June 5, 2000; Label: Nuclear Blast; Formats: DVD	—	—
Fire and Blood / Hell on Earth Part II	Released: December 2, 2002; Label: SPV; Formats: DVD	—	—
Warriors of the World United	Released: December 2, 2002; Label: Steamhammer/SPV; Formats: DVD	—	—
Hell on Earth Part III	Released: December 8, 2003; Label: Steamhammer/SPV; Formats: DVD	—	—
Hell on Earth Part IV	Released: September 13, 2005; Label: Steamhammer/SPV; Formats: DVD	40	6
The Day the Earth Shook – The Absolute Power	Released: November 24, 2006; Label: Magic Circle Music; Formats: DVD	96	—
Magic Circle Festival Volume 1	Released: 2007; Label: Magic Circle Music; Formats: DVD	—	—
Magic Circle Festival Volume 2	Released: November 27, 2008; Label: Universal; Formats: DVD	—	—
Hell on Earth Part V	Released: November 27, 2009; Label: Magic Circle Music; Formats: DVD	—	—
"—" denotes a recording that did not chart or was not released in that territory.
