= Norse mythology in popular culture =

The Norse mythology, preserved ancient Icelandic texts such as the Poetic Edda, the Prose Edda, and other lays and sagas, was little known outside Scandinavia until the 19th-century Viking revival movement. With the widespread publication of Norse myths and legends at this time, references to the Norse gods and heroes spread into European literary culture, especially in Scandinavia, Germany, and Britain. In the later 20th century, references to Norse mythology became common in science fiction and fantasy literature, role-playing games, and eventually other cultural products such as Japanese animation. Storytelling was an important aspect of Norse mythology and centuries later, with the rediscovery of the myth, Norse mythology once again relies on the impacts of storytelling to spread its agenda.

== Reintroduction to popular culture ==
Antiquaries of the 19th century such as George Webbe Dasent brought the mythology of Scandinavia back to the popular notice of many people in Germany and England; in both cases, Norse mythology was recognized as the latest surviving form of Germanic paganism. Germany and England were Christianized far earlier than the Scandinavian countries and much of their own traditions were lost.

In Britain, William Morris composed poetry such as Sigurd the Volsung on Norse legendary subjects as well as translating Icelandic sagas into English. In Germany, Richard Wagner borrowed characters and themes from Norse mythology to compose the four operas that make up Der Ring des Nibelungen (The Ring of the Nibelung), though he also utilized medieval German sources and Germanized the names of the Norse gods. In Germany, the rediscovery of Norse mythology became popularized by transforming its art-religion context to an alternative spiritual practice. The Lord of the Rings by J. R. R. Tolkien was said to have been heavily influenced by Norse mythology, which brought on many debates about structural and theoretical approaches to mythology.

== Depictions in modern popular culture ==
=== Comics ===
==== American comics ====
- The Norse Pantheon and related elements have a prominent role in the Marvel Universe, especially Thor, who has been one of the longest-running superheroes for the company and has had a starring role in both The Avengers comics and the Marvel Cinematic Universe. Also, Loki, Thor's adopted brother in this version, is one of the most prominent villains in the Marvel Universe, serving as one of the main antagonists in the Marvel Cinematic Universe franchise. Additionally, other characters from Norse mythology appear in the Marvel Universe, including Odin, Freyja, Brunnhilde/Valkyrie and the Valkyrior, Heimdall, Hela, Balder, Sif, and Fenrir.
- Odin, Thor, Loki, and several other beings and places in Norse mythology have recurring roles in Neil Gaiman's Sandman graphic novel series, most notably in the Season of Mists and The Kindly Ones stories.
  - Lucifer, being a Sandman spinoff, continues this trend, having Loki and Sigyn appear briefly. Bergelmir, Yggdrasil and Naglfar have prominent roles, and Fenrir is a major antagonist.
- The American graphic novel Gods of Asgard by Erik Evensen is an adaptation of several of the Norse myths. Gods of Asgard was awarded a Xeric grant in 2007.
- The comic miniseries Hammer of the Gods by Michael Avon Oeming and Mark Wheatley, from Insight Studios Group, 2001, uses the world of the Norse myths as a setting.
- The graphic novel series Norse Myths: A Viking Graphic Novel Series by Louise Simonson, Michael Dahl, Carl Bowen, Eduardo Garcia, and Tod Smith adapts several of the Norse myths for early readers.

==== European comics ====
- The Danish comic book series Valhalla is based on the Norse myths.
- The Belgian comic book series Thorgal is based on Norse mythology, as well as Atlantean fantasy and science fiction.

==== Manga, anime and manhwa ====
- The Norse Pantheon heroes are the main characters of the Japanese manga and anime Matantei Loki Ragnarok, loosely translated, The Mythical Detective Loki Ragnarok.
- The manhwa series Ragnarok, by Myung-Jin Lee, is based on Norse mythology and the events of Ragnarok, the prophesied fall of the gods.
- Vinland Saga takes place in Iceland and 11th-century Europe, which makes many references to Norse mythology
- In History's Strongest Disciple Kenichi, the protagonists fight against a gang organization known as Ragnarok. Each of the Eight Fists were nicknamed after a figure in Norse mythology, including Berserker, Freya, Loki, Thor, Siegfried, Hermit, Valkyrie, and their leader Odin.
- Oh! My Goddess! has aspects of Norse mythology. Heaven's main computer is called Yggdrasil, the goddesses and demons' names are based on Norse gods and goddesses, and the Underworld's computer is called Nidhogg.
- Attack on Titan, also has prominent themes of Norse mythology, including Ymir, Castle Utgard, the walls, the Titans, parallels between Norse gods/goddesses and characters, as well as plot lines that seem to mimic events in Norse mythology. The conflict between the Titan shifters and normal humans can be compared to the wars between the Aesir and Vanir. There are other references that are minor, such as the can of herring found by Ymir, which contains Norse runes on the label, and the giant boar killed in the second OVA of the anime.
- Sword Art Online has characters and story based on Norse mythology.
- In the High School DxD light novel and anime, Norse mythology is one of the supernatural factions.
  - Odin, the Chief of the Norse Gods, is a major supporting character who aided the Occult Research Club in fending off Khaos Bridge terrorism in Volume 6.
  - Loki the Norse God of Evil is the antagonist of Volume 7, who tried to start Ragnarok by killing Odin with his son Fenrir, but was defeated instead.
  - Loki's first son, the Norse Divine Wolf Fenrir, is one of the most powerful monsters in the supernatural world, being capable of killing gods with his fangs. After his father was defeated, Fenrir was captured by the Vali Team and became Le Fay Pendragon's familiar.
  - Loki's second son, the World Serpent Jormundgandr, is one of the Five Great Dragon Kings alongside its fellow Norse Dragon Fafnir.
  - Fafnir is a Norse Dragon who was killed by Sigurd and revived by the Norse Gods, becoming the familiar of Asia Argento.
  - Rossweisse, a genius Valkyrie who once served Odin as his bodyguard, was later reincarnated into a devil by Rias. She also became the lover of the protagonist Issei Hyodou.
  - Gondul, a legendary Valkyrie and Rossweisse's grandmother, debuts in Volume 17 to teach magic to Devil children in Auros Academy.
  - Nidhoggr the Norse Dragon, who resides in Niflheimr feeding on dead corpses and gnaws on Yggdrasil's roots, is one of the legendary Evil Dragons revived by Qlippoth, sent to kidnap Issei's parents.
  - Vidar, Odin's third son became his father successor as Chief God of the Norse Mythological faction due to Odin sealed himself in an alternative dimension prison to fight the Beast of Revelation 666.
- Saint Seiya: Poseidon and the Asgardians has characters and story based on Norse mythology, such as Odin, Freyja, Jörmungandr, Fenrir, Sleipnir, and Sigurd.
- In Record of Ragnarok, the Norse gods Odin, Loki, and Thor are among the thirteen gods fighting against thirteen historical humans in a tournament. In addition, the Valkyries are major characters, the manga using the ones listed in the poems Völuspá and Grímnismál.

==== Webcomics ====
- Sparkling Generation Valkyrie Yuuki is a webcomic featuring Yuuki, a boy turned into a Valkyrie by Hermod to stand against Surt and the Giants. It features many representations of Norse mythological figures in a modern-day setting.
- Brat-halla is a mythology webcomic about the Norse gods during their elementary school days. All-Father Odin and his wife Frigg constantly have their hands full with youngsters Thor (the super strong runt of the litter), Loki (the god of mischief who likes to play with dolls), Balder (the invulnerable pretty boy), Hod (the blind god of darkness and winter), Hermod (the hyper super speedster) and the rest of the Norse pantheon.
- The Order of the Stick features the Norse pantheon deities, including Thor, Sif, Loki, and Odin, as the gods of the Northern lands and participants in the creation of the universe. Durkon Thundershield, one of the main characters, is a cleric of Thor.
- Stand Still. Stay Silent., by Finnish Swede illustrator and cartoonist Minna Sundberg, is a post apocalyptic webcomic with elements from Nordic mythology, set 90 years in the future. In this story, Iceland and Norway have returned to the embrace of their ancient Gods.
- Off-White is a fantasy webcomic by Polish artists Anna Podedworna and Katarzyna Redesiuk that borrows many elements from Norse mythology, particularly the characters of the wolves Sköll and Hati, chasers of Sól and Máni.
- The God of High School features the Norse pantheon deities, including Thor and Odin.

=== Literature ===
- Stephanie Edgley of the Skulduggery Pleasant novel series took up the name Valkyrie Cain, based on the being/creature the Valkyrie.
- The Victorian adventure writer H. Rider Haggard wrote an epic adventure in the style of the Nordic sagas, Eric Brighteyes (1890).
- Various Norse gods are referenced in the book The Ballad of the White Horse (1911) by G. K. Chesterton. Odin and Thor are portrayed in a negative light, while Catholicism is the true religion and the Norse religion pagan.
- In the novel, The Incomplete Enchanter (1941) by L. Sprague de Camp and Fletcher Pratt, the protagonist finds himself in Asgard, where he allies himself with the Æsir as Ragnarök approaches.
- The Broken Sword (1954) by Poul Anderson is inspired by Norse sagas, and features numerous Norse gods, elves and trolls as characters. Later, in The Sorrow of Odin the Goth, part of his Time Patrol series, Anderson suggested that Odin was originally a 20th-century American time traveler who visited several generations of early wandering Goths who started to regard him as a god, later influencing other Germanic peoples.
- The Day of the Giants (1959) by Lester del Rey tells the tale of Ragnarok happening in a near future science fiction setting, with an erstwhile engineer arming the Norse Gods with modern weaponry.
- The Argentinian writer Jorge Luis Borges have mentioned various Norse gods along his life work, as he did in the short story Ulrica and the poem titled A wolf (Un Lobo). He was buried in Geneva, and his gravestone has inscriptions written in old English and Old Norse; the figures drawn on it were inspired by the Völsunga Saga and the Anglo-Saxon Battle of Maldon.
- According to J. R. R. Tolkien, his fantasy works The Hobbit (1937), The Lord of the Rings (1955), and The Silmarillion (1977) were heavily influenced by the myths of the Northern Europeans. Due to the stories' popularity, elements of its fantasy world became popular perceptions of the fantasy genre, such as elves, dwarfs, and trolls. Within literature, Tolkien's interpretation and use of Norse mythology caused debates of how to analyze myths through structural and theoretical approaches.
- Children's writer Alan Garner borrowed many Norse concepts, such as the tale of Freyja's necklace Brísingamen and the hard winter (Fimbulwinter) which portends the end of the world, Ragnarok in his classic story, The Weirdstone of Brisingamen (1960).
- Diana Wynne Jones's novel, Eight Days of Luke (1975) is an allegory of the Norse gods. Loki, Thor, Odin, Frey and Freya are characters in the story. Several other characters from Norse mythology such as Siegfried, Brunhilde, Baldur and Sigyn are mentioned as well, though not all by name.
- The Book of the Dun Cow (1978) by Walter Wangerin, Jr. combines Norse legends with biblical themes.
- Douglas Adams referenced to the Norse god, Thor in his book Life, the Universe and Everything (1982). Odin and Thor also appear in The Long Dark Tea-Time of the Soul, one of two novels by Adams about protagonist Dirk Gently. In The Hitchhiker's Guide to the Galaxy and And Another Thing... by Eoin Colfer, Thor appears in a prominent role.
- David Drake's Northworld (1990) trilogy retells stories from Norse mythology in a science fiction setting.
- Nick Perumov involves Norse gods, creatures and events in his fantasy novel Godsdoom (1995), as well as in its sequels and prequels.
- Various characters from Norse mythology inspire the naming and characterization of those in J.K. Rowling's Harry Potter series, such as the werewolf Fenrir Greyback and the Death Eater Thorfinn Rowle.
- Norse mythology plays heavily into the Everworld series of fantasy by K.A. Applegate, Loki and Hel being perhaps the two most notable Norse characters.
- Michael Jan Friedman's Vidar trilogy (The Hammer and the Horn, 1985, The Seekers and the Sword, 1985, and The Fortress and the Fire, 1988) presents Norse gods both in Asgard and the contemporary world.
- The novels Bloodtide (1999) and Bloodsong (2000) by children's author Melvin Burgess are loosely based on the Völsunga saga legend. He also wrote a short story about pagan sacrifice in the 2008 short story collection Centuries of Stories.
- Jim Butcher's Dresden Files series (2000) has elements of Norse mythology, such as Valkyries, Einherjar, Jotunn, and some of the Aesir.
- Odin, Loki, and several other Norse mythological figures are major characters in Neil Gaiman's novel American Gods (2001). Gaiman returned to such Nordic inspirations when he wrote Odd and the Frost Giants as a World Book Day publication in 2008. This story is loosely based on the Master-Builder narrative found in the Gylfaginning (Old Norse: The Tricking of Gylfi) section of Snorri Sturluson's Prose Edda.
- The Sea of Trolls (2004) by Nancy Farmer and its sequel, The Land of the Silver Apples (2007), are based on and influenced by Norse mythology.
- The Thrall's Tale (2006) by Judith Lindbergh is heavily influenced by Norse mythology and is partially told by Thorbjorg the Seeress, an Old Norse priestess of the Vinland Sagas.
- Runemarks by Joanne Harris (2007) is based on the Norse legends, and creates a post-Ragnarok world in which the gods have been scattered and their powers diminished.
- Greg van Eekhout's debut novel Norse Code, released May 2009, retells the story of Ragnarok set in a quickly-deteriorating Los Angeles.
- The Halo series novel Contact Harvest takes place on the planet Harvest, which contains many references to Norse mythology. These references include locations named after the Bifröst, Utgard, with two of the central A.I. characters being named after Loki and Sif. Many other characters and locations contain references to Norse mythology due to the majority of the colony having Scandinavian ancestry.
- The Tales from the Wyrd Museum trilogy by Robin Jarvis heavily utilizes Norse mythology as the basis for the stories, with the third, The Fatal Strand, prominently featuring Odin and Yggdrasil or in-story versions of them.
- Witches of East End by Melissa de la Cruz is about immortal witches that are actually Norse gods, including the goddess Freyja, Loki and Balder
- The Ragnarök Conspiracy by Erec Stebbins (2012) is a contemporary thriller centered on a plot by terrorists to instigate a global war between Western and Islamic nations. It contains references to Old Norse, Norse runes such as the Elder Futhark, and Norse mythology including the events of Ragnarök.
- Rick Riordan's Magnus Chase and the Gods of Asgard trilogy (2015) is based on Norse mythology and set in the same universe as his Camp Half-Blood Chronicles.

=== Music ===
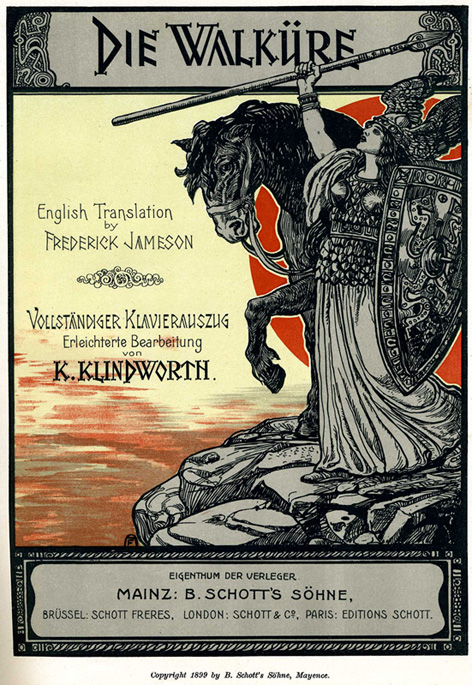
Illustration to a Wagner's Opera

- Norse mythology influenced Richard Wagner's use of literary themes from it to compose the four operas that make up Der Ring des Nibelungen (The Ring of the Nibelung).
- Mats Wendt based his neo-romantic 16-hour symphonic suite Eddan on the chronological reconstruction of the Norse myths by Viktor Rydberg.
- Burzum is a Norwegian Black metal band whose lyrics and imagery are often inspired by Norse mythology. Its founder, Varg Vikernes, has also written many books about Norse mythology and is an outspoken Pagan.
- Norse mythology is a recurring theme in Heavy metal music lyrics.
- Manowar has numerous releases referencing Norse mythology. Besides the 2007 concept album Gods of War, there are the songs Gates of Valhalla (Into Glory Ride, 1983), Blood of My Enemies and Kill with Power (Hail to England, 1984), Thor (The Powerhead) (Sign of the Hammer, 1984), The Crown and the Ring (Kings of Metal, 1988), and Swords in the Wind and Fight Until We Die (Warriors of the World 2002), and Righteous Glory (The Lord of Steel 2011).
- Swedish Symphonic metal band Therion based many of its lyrics on Norse mythology, including the 2001 concept album Secret of the Runes.
- The Viking metal music genre focuses on Viking Age and Norse mythology as inspiration for lyrics. Examples include Bathory, Falkenbach, among others. A broader definition of Viking metal may also include Viking-themed or Norse-themed Folk metal (Turisas, Ensiferum, Finntroll, Týr), Doom metal (Doomsword), and Death metal (Amon Amarth).
- Norwegian symphonic metal band Leaves' Eyes released the concept album Vinland Saga (2006), based on Saga of Erik the Red and Njord (2009), based on Norse mythology in general.
- German Heavy metal band Rebellion recorded three Norse-based albums, called The History of the Vikings trilogy.
- Other bands and songs include Led Zeppelin ‒ Immigrant Song, Jethro Tull ‒ Cold Wind to Valhalla, Uriah Heep ‒ Rainbow Demon (a reference to Bifröst and Heimdallr), several songs by Blind Guardian, Ginnungagap.
- Canadian musician Melissa Auf der Maur's second studio album, Out of Our Minds, is centered on Norse mythology.
- The 2013 debut album by American rap duo Mischief Storm references, expands, and is based on Norse mythology. Stories are told through a modern interpretation and can be very violent, due to the underground nature of the group and an aim to paint brutal, vivid pictures of Viking life and Norse mythology.
- Many Russian bands also use Norse mythology as main theme of lyrics ‒ Troll Bends Fir, Nordverg, Ulfdallir and others.

==== Nordic folk ====
The modern Nordic folk genre has several bands, soloists, and music projects focused mostly or entirely on themes revolving around Norse mythology.

- Wardruna is a Norwegian musical project with the purpose of exploring and evoking the deep Norse wisdom and spirituality through music inspired on the Futhark runes.
- German Pagan Folk band Faun wrote several songs and whole albums featuring elements of Norse mythology.
- Other such projects include Danish musician Danheim, international band Heilung, French band Skáld, and Russian band Nytt Land.

=== Television ===
==== Live action TV ====
- The Norwegian-language Netflix drama Ragnarok features a boy who discovers he is Thor and battles a family of frost giants in human form in the modern-day town of Edda.
- Several of the Norse gods feature prominently in the Danish miniseries, Jul i Valhal, with Loki being a major character, and many of the Norse myths are referenced.
- Miniseries Dark Kingdom: The Dragon King, also known as Niebelungen, is based on Nibelungenlied.
- The TV series Stargate SG-1 regularly features the Asgard race, a powerful, yet friendly alien species broadly depicted as somewhat resembling grey aliens and being the original source of the Norse gods, having portrayed them to help humanity. Thor, a member of the Asgard High Council, is a recurring character on the show. Their spaceships, as seen from below, are shaped like Mjolnir, Thor's hammer. In Stargate Atlantis, it is revealed that there is a sub-group of Asgard called the Vanir, opposed to the agenda of the other Asgard, and analogous to the Vanir of Norse mythology.
- In the fifth season of the television series Hercules: The Legendary Journeys, the episodes Norse by Norsevest and Somewhere over the Rainbow Bridge depict Hercules traveling to Asgard and being thrust into a major conflict among the Viking Norse Gods.
  - Odin and the Valkyries make several appearances in the sixth season of the television series Xena: Warrior Princess, which is a spin off of Hercules: The Legendary Journeys.
- In Metalocalypse, Skwisgaar Skwigelf and Toki Wartooth both seem to show some belief in Norse mythology.
- In the Robin of Sherwood story "The Time of the Wolf" (1986), the villain Gulnar leads a murderous cult which worships the Norse monster Fenris, called "The Sons of Fenris".
- The television series Doctor Who has referenced the Norse twilight of the gods in the story, The Curse of Fenric.
- The television series Supernatural has referenced the Norse Vanir in an episode of the first season, as gods that locals of Scandinavian descent brought with them. Supernatural also has four episodes that involves a being believed to be Loki the Trickster. In the fifth-season episode Hammer of the Gods, members of several godly pantheons meet in order to deal with the matter of the Christian apocalypse. Lucifer kills all the gods except for Kali, including Norse gods Odin, Baldur and Loki, who had been revealed to actually be the archangel Gabriel. Thor's hammer Mjolnir later appears in an eighth-season episode as an object at a supernatural auction house, bought by Norse god Vili. In the season 13 episode "Unfinished Business", Gabriel is revealed to have made a deal with the real Loki, also portrayed by Richard Speight Jr., to take on his identity and persona millennia earlier to hide from Heaven and to have sought the aid of Loki and his sons Fenrir, Narfi and Sleipnir in hiding after faking his death once more. Instead, the gods had sold him to the Prince of Hell, Asmodeus, and Gabriel seeks revenge with the help of Sam and Dean Winchester. Gabriel kills Fenris, Narfi, and Sleipnir before learning that Loki blames Gabriel for the death of Odin, who he still loved despite their differences, and that Loki's betrayal was his way of getting revenge. After a fight, Gabriel kills Loki with a specially-crafted wooden sword and gets his own revenge upon him.
- Thor was the main subject of episode 10 of Clash of the Gods.
- New Zealand television series The Almighty Johnsons is centered on a family who are all reincarnations of Norse Gods.
- Vikings is a Canadian TV series loosely based on the legendary Viking Ragnar Lodbrok. The characters in the show have visions of Odin and/or pray to several Germanic deities, such as Thor, Freya, Freyr, and Loki.
- True Blood features a vampire character named Eric Northman who was once a Viking prince and now the owner of a Shreveport, Louisiana-based nightclub Fangtasia.
- The television series Witches of East End, based on the book of the same name, is about witches from Asgard.
- The Japanese Tokusatsu television series Kamen Rider Gaim makes several references to Norse mythology, especially with the organization Yggdrasill Corporation, the forest-based other-world Helheim, and in the armor designs for several Riders who appear in the series.
- The American Gods TV series features Norse mythological figures, being an adaptation of Neil Gaiman's novel American Gods., most prominently Odin in the first season.
- Victor Magtanggol is a Filipino television series set in the modern world after the events of Ragnarok, where most of the Norse gods are already dead, including Thor. The main antagonist in the series is Loki, who was revived to take over the world. The story revolves around the main character Victor Magtanggol (played by Alden Richards) who was chosen by lady Sif to be the new wielder of Thor's hammer Mjolnir.
- Alternative versions of Loki also appear in the 2021 Disney+ series Loki, which is set in the Marvel Cinematic Universe (MCU) and shares continuity with the other films and television shows of the franchise.

==== Anime ====
- Rintaro Okabe, protagonist in the Japanese anime series, Steins;Gate, uses Norse mythology to name several operations within the series. Each operation has to do with preventing the dystopia in 2036, but the names of the operations have no real connection to the actual myths.
- The High School DxD light novels and the third season of the anime feature Odin, Loki, the Valkyrie Rossweisse, Thor's hammer, and Fenrir.
- The Japanese series Bladedance of Elementalers, Rinslet Laurenfrost's Contracted Spirit is an ice spirit Dire Wolf named Fenrir.
- In the anime series Sword Art Online, the game ALfheim Online is based on Norse mythology.
- In the Japanese anime series Blue Dragon, a character named Logi comes with many references to the mythology; including his name sounding like Loki's, his shadows called "Valkyrie" and "Odin", who wields the Gungnir, and his fleet of robots named Sleipnir.
- Attack on Titan has elements of Norse mythology, such as the first Titan being called Ymir.
- Vinland Saga mentions Norse gods such as Thor and Odin.
- One Piece Has character's named after Norse gods such as Loki and Ragnir and has aspects of Norse mythology such as the Yggdrasil.

==== Animation ====
- In the 1990s Disney animated series Gargoyles, in "Eye of the Storm," set in modern Norway as the thirteenth episode of the "Avalon World Tour" story arc, Goliath is involved in what culminates in the return of Odin's missing right eye to him. Odin (voiced by W. Morgan Sheppard) is depicted as one of the series' magical "Oberon's children", a race of powerful beings led by Oberon and Titania.
- In the original DuckTales series episode "Maid of the Myth", Ms. Beakley is mistaken for Brunnhilde. The episode also features a cameo from Thor.
- The 2017 reboot of Disney's DuckTales featured "The Rumble for Ragnarok", where a wrestling tournament is held in Valhalla every decade to determine the destruction of the Earth, with the Asgardians not really caring what happens, as a glorious death for Earth means that everybody will be joining them in Valhalla. Valhalla's champion, Jormungandr, takes the form of a humanoid snake wrestler to give his opponents, Scrooge McDuck and his family, a fair fight. Fenrir and Hel, under the name "Hecka", are also members of Jormungandr's wrestling team.
- In 2023, the Rick and Morty animated series' seventh season aired the episode "Mort: Ragnarick," in which the main characters end up in Valhalla.

=== Film ===
- The title characters in the 1958 film, The Vikings, are active Odin-worshippers. Some characters share parallels with Norse gods, like Kirk Douglas' Einar losing an eye or Tony Curtis' Eric losing a hand.
- Erik the Viking featuring Tim Robbins is based loosely on the myths.
- Jim Carrey played a man whose life is changed after he stumbles upon a mask possessing the powers of the Norse god Loki in The Mask.
  - The film Son of the Mask features a mischievous Loki (portrayed by Alan Cumming) as the antagonist, who is repeatedly scolded by an omnipotent Odin (portrayed by Bob Hoskins).
- The Marvel Cinematic Universe features Thor and other Asgardians based on the Norse gods. The film uses Yggdrasil, depicted as a constellation in space resembling a tree which binds the Nine Realms together, and the Bifröst, the means by which the Asgardians travel to other planets, as plot bases.
- Ingmar Bergman's The Virgin Spring (1960) provides a meditation on the persistence of the old religion in medieval Christian Sweden when the dark energy of Odin is unleashed by a character's secret worship of the god.
- The DreamWorks animated films How to Train Your Dragon (2010) and How to Train Your Dragon 2 (2014) feature Vikings who make a few references to the Norse gods Odin and Thor and show passages written in runes.

=== Video games ===
- The plot of Ash of Gods: Redemption is significantly based on Norse mythology, including names of the Runes and Gods used as the names of states and cities.
- In Ace Combat Zero: The Belkan War, the player is part of a two-man mercenary squadron called Galm Team, a reference to Garmr, a Norse hellhound.
- Tomb Raider: Underworld uses the Norse mythology keystones, names and artifacts as its main plot basis. Protagonist Lara Croft, in the course of her search for her mother, visits the Neiflheim and other mythical places, wielding Thor's hammer Mjollnir.
- In StarCraft, four of the fifteen Zerg Broods are named Fenris, Garm, Jormungand, and Surtur, and there is also an overlord hero unit called Yggdrasil. In addition, there is a Terran unit called a Valkyrie; similarly, in Starcraft 2, there are several Terran units that are named based on Norse references.
- The tri-Ace role-playing video game Valkyrie Profile is based on Norse mythology, though it does deviate at some points. The main character is a valkyrie named Lenneth, who represents Brynhild and has been commanded by Odin to gather souls of dead warriors for the upcoming battles of Ragnarok. Depending on the path the player chooses, Lenneth will face either Surt, lord of the fire giants, or Loki in combat.
- Max Payne and Max Payne 2: The Fall of Max Payne both have several references to Norse mythology, including characters named Balder and Woden, Aesir Corporation, the drug Valkyr, and the Ragnarock nightclub.
- In the Final Fantasy series, various characters and items are named after elements of Norse mythology. Final Fantasy VII's world features cities named Nibelheim, hometown of Cloud Strife, and Midgar, a major city named after Midgard. Several games include weapons (Final Fantasy VII and Final Fantasy Tactics) or airships (Final Fantasy VIII) named Ragnarok. Party member Freya from Final Fantasy IX is named for Freya. Final Fantasy XIII and its sequels feature multiple references, including the otherworld realm of Valhalla, the world-ending beast Ragnarok, various names used in altered forms and outfits inspired by figures from the Norse mythos. Odin is also a recurring summon in the games.
- The Norse are a playable faction in Ensemble Studio's Age of Mythology.
- In Halo, the player character Master Chief wears a special type of armor called MJOLNIR.
- Too Human has a story based on Norse mythology where it is interpreted that the Gods are actually Cybernetically-Enhanced Humans.
- Viking: Battle for Asgard is set in Midgard where the forces of Hel and Freya battle for dominance.
- In Eve Online, many advanced ships and items associated with the Minmatar race have names based on Norse mythology. These include the Ragnarok-class Titan, the Sleipnir-class Command Ship, the Einherji fighter drone, the Fenrir-class Freighter, Vargur-class Marauder, Huginn-class Recon Ship, Muninn-class Heavy Assault Ship, Loki-class Strategic Cruiser, Naglfar-class Dreadnaught, the Nidhoggur-class Carrier, and Hel-class Supercarrier.
- In Castle of the Winds, the freeware/shareware RPG for Windows, many characters, places, and weapons are named after Norse mythology.
- The superhero game Marvel: Ultimate Alliance features the Marvel Comics version of Thor as one of the major playable characters and the Norse characters and realms as the focus of Act III, in which Doctor Doom and his Masters of Evil conquer Asgard and steal Odin's powers.
- Another Marvel Comics-related game, Thor: God of Thunder, was released as a tie-in to the 2011 film Thor and features mythological realms that are not explored in the film.
- A Neverwinter Nights and Neverwinter Nights 2 persistent world called Markshire NWN1 version | NWN2 version is influenced heavily by Norse mythology, incorporating the pantheon directly into their world and taking the culture into a renaissance period. The world is highly roleplaying oriented. Markshire is listed as a Hall of Fame world and has been reviewed with the highest rating of any world for NWN on the NWVault.
- In Odin Sphere one of the five warlords is the Demon Lord Odin, who commands an army of Valkyrie warriors. The game depicts many aspects of Norse mythology, such as the Armageddon ‒ standing for the Ragnarök, the Haljas, guardians of the Netherworld, the Aesir and the Vanir (Valkyries and Fairies) fighting over control of the land.
- Rune is a third-person hack-and-slash game featuring a young Viking warrior on a fantasy quest, based around Norse mythology.
- In the video game series Fire Emblem, several weapons are named after figures and objects in Norse mythology, including the weapons Garm, Gleipnir, and Fenrir.
- In the video game Age of Empires: Mythologies, the Norse are a playable nation.
- In the PC based MMORPG game World of Warcraft, various storylines, characters, locations, and monsters are named after or based on popular parts of Norse mythology.
- In the video game Tales of Symphonia, Heimdall, Ymir, Fenrir, and Yggdrasil were taken from Norse mythology, with Heimdall being the name of the village of the elves and Ymir the forest in which it is concealed, Fenrir as the Summon Spirit of Ice Celsius' companion, and Yggdrasill being the world tree of infinite mana.
- In the video game Ben Hur: Blood of Braves, players can race with chariots through Asgard. They can also play with fictitious Norse characters and worship characters from Norse mythology such as Thor, Odin, Freya and the Valkyries.
- In the video game series Boktai, many aspects of the plot are based on Norse mythology, such as the final bosses Hel, Jormungandr, and Vanargand, and the ultimate weapons Gram, Gungnir, and Mjollnir.
- In the video game La Tale, Norse mythology is reoccurrent in many of the game's themes, with Valkyries appearing as enemies and Hel and Odin as bosses. Various maps have ideas taken from Norse mythology, including Bitfrost, Valhalla, Asgard, The Long Tree (Yggdrasil), and Midgard.
- A Valkyrie appears as a playable character in Heroes of Newerth.
- The Shin Megami Tensei: Persona video game series contains several Norse gods and beings as summonable Personas. Additionally, some skills, such as Odin's Thunder Reign, Loki's Niflheim, and Surt's Ragnarok are derived from Norse mythology.
- In the video game Xenogears, some names were taken from Norse mythology, including Andvari, Fenrir, Heimdall, Sigurd, and Yggdrasil.
- The MMORPG RuneScape has a few notable links to Norse mythology, mostly in the 'Fremennik Tribe' and their quests.
- In the MMO Dark Age of Camelot there are three playable realms, one of which is called Midgard. The people encountered there have many references to Norse mythology, having playable classes such as Berserker, Runemaster, Skald, Thane and Valkyrie.
- The video game Magicka is loosely based on Norse mythology, and contains several elements and references.
- The role-playing game The Elder Scrolls V: Skyrim by Bethesda Softworks is heavily influenced by Norse mythology in its setting.
- In Age of Empires Online, the Norse are a playable faction.
- In the PC game Heroes of Might and Magic III, the faction Stronghold has a few Norse mythology elements, one being the building Valhalla.
- In the Heroes of the Storm, playable hero Tychus can summon the Odin, a heavy combat walker, as one of his two heroic abilities. Cassia can use her heroic ability to summon a Valkyrie that rushes towards her, pulling the first enemy Hero hit, and knocking back all other enemy Heroes in the way.
- In the PC MOBA, Smite, several playable gods are from the Norse pantheon, including Thor, Odin, Loki, Hel, Fenrir, Ymir, Sol, Skadi, Freya, Tyr, Ratatoskr, Fafnir, Ullr, Jörmungandr Heimdallr, and Surtr.
- The puzzle platform game Munin is about Odin's raven Munin, whom Loki has stripped of wings and transformed into a human girl, and must travel through the nine worlds of Yggdrasil to relocate her missing feathers.
- In the 2011 video game Dark Souls, there is a large, sword-wielding wolf named Sif that serves as a boss battle in the game. Sif's name references the Nordic goddess of the Earth, Sif, and he is a direct reference to the great lupine son of Loki, Fenrir.
- In the role-playing game series Etrian Odyssey, the Yggdrasil Tree is a recurring plot element of great relevance and significance.
- In the 2017 video game Hellblade: Senua's Sacrifice, Norse mythology plays a key role in design of the world and enemies, with the developers going to great lengths to research the topic.
- The 2018 video game God of War, is loosely based on Norse mythology, a change of direction for a series previously centered around Greek mythology. Baldr appears as the main antagonist, Freya, Mímir, and Jörmungandr appear as allies, Odin and Thor are background antagonists, with the former being indirectly responsible for the events of the game and the events of the Norse era as a whole and are mentioned frequently with the latter's sons Móði and Magni appearing as antagonists. Kratos' second wife is Laufey, a Frost Giant, and his son Atreus' original name is Loki. The 2022 sequel God of War Ragnarök depicts events inspired by Ragnarök and features Týr, Norns, Jörmungandr, Fenrir, Freyr, Thrud, and Heimdall, as well as Thor and Odin as major antagonists.
- In the PC space simulator Freespace, names for starships are derived from the Norse mythology, including Fenris and Loki.
- In Pokémon X and Y, the legendary trio, Xerneas, Yveltal, and Zygarde, are based upon creatures from Norse mythology, with Xerneas representing Eikþyrnir, Yveltal representing Hræsvelgr, and Zygarde's three forms representing Fenrir (10%), Jörmungandr (50%), and Hel (Complete Forme).
- The game Jotun uses the mythology as a setting, with the protagonist traveling through various realms in order to fight the gigantic jötunn.
- The Bayonetta franchise makes multiple references to Norse mythology. The primary antagonist of the first title is named Balder, and the creator god of myth is referred to as Aesir. A character named Loki also appears as a supporting character in the sequel.
- Warriors Orochi 4 adds Norse and Greek deities to its selection of characters. The game depicts Odin, having survived Ragnarok, seeking to absorb energy from other realms via Yggdrasil to avoid his impending demise. In an effort to support this, he orders Loki to infiltrate the Greek pantheon, disguised as the hero Perseus.
- One of the bosses in Mega Man Zero 4 is based on Fenrir, being a robot known as Fenri Lunaedge. The story also makes reference to Ragnarok, as Dr. Weil, the main villain, intends to use the orbital cannon Ragnarok to destroy the last vestiges of vegetation on Earth so that all humans are subjected to his dictatorial rule. When this plan fails, he tries to directly crash Ragnarok into the planet.
- In Kingdom Hearts Dark Road, Xehanort and Eraqus's teacher is named Master Odin, with a design based on Georg von Rosen's 1893 depiction of Odin. As well, their classmates and the upperclassmen are named after figures and gods from Norse mythology.
- In Xenoblade Chronicles 2, the World Tree of Norse mythology is central to the plot, with the paradise of Elysium said to be at the top. The name of the musical track that plays in the World Tree is titled "Yggdrasil".
- Assassin's Creed: Valhalla is based heavily on Viking history as well as Norse mythology. The game features several story arcs set in Asgard and Jotunheim. Characters such as Odin, Tyr, Thor, Loki, and Freyja feature in the game, and their respective myths form the background for parts of the game's story.
- Two spellcards in Touhou Project are called Divine Spear "Spear the Gungnir" and Taboo "Lævateinn".
- Ark: Survival Evolved includes the Fjordur DLC, which introduced the Mjolnir weapon skin as a final reward if a player defeated the final boss and had reached Player Level 190, only achievable if they completed all the objectives in the DLC game expansions.
- In Elder Scrolls, the Nords, one of the races of men, are modelled after the barbarian tribes of Northern Europe, mainly the Norse.
- The Seven Deadly Sins: Grand Cross includes an original story arc based on the Norse myths entitled "Ragnarok: Fate of Gods". It includes several iterations of important figures of the Norse myths, such as Sigurd, Brunhild, Fenrir, Thor, Jormungand, and others.
- Thor's hammer can be found in the second mission of Call of Duty: Black Ops II.

== Norse mythology in other media ==
- The role-playing game Dungeons & Dragons has included Norse gods as optional elements since the publication of its Gods, Demi-Gods & Heroes sourcebook (1976). Other elements of Norse mythology appear in creatures, place names and cosmological concepts in many places of the game. As the authors adjusted mythological elements into "the internal organization of play structures alongside references to other traditions [...], it produces social representations and an imagination of the specific medieval North." Scholar of Scandivian myths Filippo Di Laurent pointed out that Dungeons & Dragons treats the various historical texts of mythology "as a coherent whole" and thus "erases the context socio-historical production of each of it". This "decontextualized presentation" presents the reader a "universalist version" of the myths, "simplified in popular culture".
- The Yu-Gi-Oh! Trading Card Game has a series of cards (the Nordic, Aesir, and Generaider archetypes) based on Norse gods and other mythological creatures.
- The Space Wolves chapter of Space Marines in Warhammer 40,000 are heavily influenced by Norse mythology, with their homeworld of Fenris being named for Fenrir the wolf, who also serves as inspiration for massive Fenrisian wolves that prowl the planet's wintery landscape.

== See also ==
- Viking revival
