= Hell on Stage =

Live album by Manowar
- Released: April 20, 1999
- Genres: Heavy metal, power metal
- Length: 1:37:47
- Label: Metal Blade Records

Manowar chronology
| Steel Warriors (1998) | Hell on Stage (1999) | Warriors of the World (2002) |

Professional ratings
Review scores
| Source | Rating |
|---|---|
| Allmusic | 3/5 stars |

Hell on Stage is the second live album by heavy metal band Manowar, recorded live on the Hell on Stage world tour in 1998.

== Track listing ==
=== Disc 1 ===
1. "Metal Daze" (Battle Hymns)
2. "Dark Avenger" (Battle Hymns)
3. "March for Revenge (By the Soldiers of Death)" (Into Glory Ride)
4. "Hatred" (Into Glory Ride)
5. "Gates of Valhalla" (Into Glory Ride)
6. "Bridge of Death" (Hail to England)
7. "William's Tale" (Battle Hymns)
8. "Guyana (Cult of the Damned)" (Sign of the Hammer)

=== Disc 2 ===
1. "The Warrior's Prayer" (Kings of Metal)
2. "Blood of the Kings" (Kings of Metal)
3. "Sting of the Bumblebee" (Kings of Metal)
4. "Heart of Steel" (Kings of Metal)
5. "Master of the Wind" (The Triumph of Steel)
6. "Outlaw" (Louder Than Hell)
7. "The Power" (Louder Than Hell)
8. "The Crown And The Ring (Lament Of The Kings)" (Kings of Metal)

When the album was first sold in some European countries, it was packaged with an extra CD EP which contained songs recorded live in those countries.

=== French Edition Bonus CD ===
| No. | Title | Length |
|---|---|---|
| 1. | "Lady Marmalade (Voulez-Vous Coucher Avec Moi Ce Soir?)" | 4:11 |
| 2. | "Metal Warriors" | 3:55 |
| 3. | "Kill With Power" | 4:51 |
| 4. | "Courage (French Studio Version)" | 4:06 |

=== German Edition Bonus CD ===
| No. | Title | Length |
|---|---|---|
| 1. | "Kings of Metal" | 4:40 |
| 2. | "Herz aus Stahl" | 5:49 |
| 3. | "Metal Warriors" | 4:14 |

=== Portuguese Edition Bonus CD ===
| No. | Title | Length |
|---|---|---|
| 1. | "Carry On" | 4:15 |
| 2. | "Kill With Power" | 3:32 |
| 3. | "Kings of Metal" | 4:05 |

=== Spanish Edition Bonus CD ===
| No. | Title | Length |
|---|---|---|
| 1. | "Manowar" | 4:39 |
| 2. | "Kill With Power" | 4:21 |
| 3. | "Hail and Kill" | 7:24 |

== Charts ==
| Chart (1999) | Peak position |
|---|---|
| Austrian Albums (Ö3 Austria) | 50 |
| German Albums (Offizielle Top 100) | 18 |
