= Hell on Wheels (album) =

Live album by Manowar
- Released: November 18, 1997
- Genres: Heavy metal, power metal
- Length: 1:59:26
- Label: BMG

Manowar chronology
Louder Than Hell (1996)	Hell on Wheels (1997)	The Kingdom of Steel (1998)

Professional ratings
Review scores
Source	Rating
AllMusic	2.5/5 stars

Hell on Wheels is the first live album by heavy metal band Manowar.

== Track listing ==
=== Disc 1 ===
1. "Manowar" (Battle Hymns)
2. "Kings of Metal" (Kings of Metal)
3. "Kill With Power" (Hail to England)
4. "Sign of the Hammer" (Sign of the Hammer)
5. "My Spirit Lives On" (Louder Than Hell)
6. "Piano Interlude"
7. "Courage" (Louder Than Hell)
8. "Spirit Horse of the Cherokee" (The Triumph of Steel)
9. "Blood of My Enemies" (Hail to England)
10. "Hail and Kill" (Kings of Metal)
11. "Warriors of the World"

=== Disc 2 ===
1. "Wheels of Fire" (Kings of Metal)
2. "Metal Warriors" (The Triumph of Steel)
3. "Army of the Immortals" (Hail to England)
4. "Black Arrows" (Hail to England)
5. "Fighting the World" (Fighting the World)
6. "Thor (The Powerhead)" (Sign of the Hammer)
7. "King" (Louder Than Hell)
8. "The Gods Made Heavy Metal" (Louder Than Hell)
9. "Black Wind, Fire And Steel" (Fighting the World)
10. "Return of the Warlord" (Louder Than Hell)
11. "Carry On" (Fighting the World)
12. "Battle Hymn" (Battle Hymns)

== Charts ==
Chart (1997)	Peak position
German Albums (Offizielle Top 100)	37
