= The Hell of Steel: Best of Manowar =

Compilation album by Manowar
- Released: 1994
- Genre: Heavy metal, power metal
- Length: 71:27
- Label: Atlantic

Manowar chronology
The Triumph of Steel (1992)	The Hell of Steel: Best of Manowar (1994)	Louder Than Hell (1996)

Professional ratings
Review scores
Source	Rating
AllMusic	2/5 stars
Collector's Guide to Heavy Metal	6/10

The Hell of Steel: Best of Manowar is a compilation album by heavy metal band Manowar. It was released in 1994 by Atlantic Records due to contractual obligations and featured 14 tracks from albums released under the Atlantic label (Fighting the World, Kings of Metal and The Triumph of Steel). The band does not consider it an official release.

== Track listing ==
No.	Title	Length
1.	"Fighting the World"	3:46
2.	"Kings of Metal"	3:43
3.	"Demon's Whip"	7:44
4.	"Warrior's Prayer"	4:20
5.	"Defender"	6:01
6.	"Crown and the Ring"	4:46
7.	"Blow Your Speakers"	3:36
8.	"Metal Warriors"	3:59
9.	"Black Wind, Fire and Steel"	5:17
10.	"Hail and Kill"	5:54
11.	"Power of Thy Sword"	7:49
12.	"Herz Aus Stahl"	5:10
13.	"Kingdom Come"	3:55
14.	"Master of the Wind"	5:27

== Additional information ==
- The song "Herz Aus Stahl" is a German version of the Kings of Metal track "Heart of Steel".
- While the tracks are not laid out in chronological order, the album starts off with the first track of Fighting the World and ends with the final track of The Triumph of Steel.

== Charts ==
Chart (1994)	Peak position
Austrian Albums (Ö3 Austria)	33
Finnish Albums (The Official Finnish Charts)	26
German Albums (Offizielle Top 100)	29
