= Steel Warriors =

Compilation album by Manowar
- Released: 1998
- Genre: Heavy metal, power metal
- Length: 67:00
- Label: MCA Records

Manowar chronology
| The Kingdom of Steel (1998) | Steel Warriors (1998) | Hell on Stage (1999) |

Steel Warriors is a 1998 compilation album by the American heavy metal band Manowar. It includes only songs from the albums Into Glory Ride and Hail to England. It was rated 3.5 stars by AllMusic.

== Track listing ==
1. "Secret of Steel"
2. "Black Arrows"
3. "Each Dawn I Die"
4. "Hatred"
5. "Warlord"
6. "Gloves of Metal"
7. "Bridge of Death"
8. "Hail to England"
9. "Kill With Power"
10. "March for Revenge (By the Soldiers of Death)"
11. "Gates of Valhalla"
12. "Army of the Immortals"
