= Blow Your Speakers =

Blow Your Speakers may refer to:

- "Blow Your Speakers", a 1986 song by Manowar from Fighting the World
- "Blow Your Speakers", a 2011 song by Big Time Rush from Elevate
