= Into Glory Ride =

Studio album by Manowar
- Released: July 1, 1983
- Studio: Music America, Rochester, New York
- Genre: Heavy metal; power metal
- Length: 45:26
- Label: Megaforce; Music for Nations
- Producer: Manowar; Jon Mathias

Manowar chronology
Battle Hymns (1982)	Into Glory Ride (1983)	Hail to England (1984)

Into Glory Ride is the second studio album by American heavy metal band Manowar. Released in July 1983 by Megaforce Records and Music for Nations, it was the first to feature drummer Scott Columbus. The album's title is a reference to a lyric of the title track from the band's debut album Battle Hymns.

A heavy metal and power metal album, members Ross "The Boss" Friedman and Joey DeMaio brought themes of fantasy, historical warfare, and sword and sorcery to prominence in songs such as "Gloves of Metal" in the album, representing Manowar's turning point in their musical direction. The negative publicity of their debut album inspired Manowar to develop their fanbase, including a publicized signing of a recording contract in their blood and the phrase "death to false metal", which originated from Into Glory Ride.

The album received mixed but favorable receptions among critics and writers, with some writers calling Into Glory Ride influential in developing power metal music and a refinement of Manowar's music style.

== Background ==
After the release of their debut album Battle Hymns, Liberty Records and Bill Aucoin dropped Manowar due to negative press and complications in marketing the band. The bassist Joey DeMaio called them "idiots", describing that for a while, Manowar was "left for dead". This was acknowledged in the album notes of their second album Into Glory Ride, where Manowar wrote about their reemergence after being struck by "deceivers", and "left for dead". For their second album, Manowar signed with Megaforce Records and gained headlines in the British music press for signing the new contract in their own blood, becoming the first band to demonstrate their commitment this way and being against "false metal". The signing was a cover story in the 1983 July/August issue No. 47 of Kerrang!

In a TrueMetal.it September 2021 interview with Ross "The Boss" Friedman, Friedman stated that as a "super history buff", he was fond of Vikings and Ancient Greece. With Joey DeMaio, Friedman conceived the image of the band and the concept for Into Glory Ride. Regarding the album artwork and the image of the band, Friedman stated that Manowar "ordered real swords; it was all real, we were real. We were completely involved. We used to think that everything in life is a battle, until today, everything is a battle, you have to strive to improve, to prepare, to overcome obstacles and to become a better person every day. Be good to others and tough on your enemies. We were all Manowars, or so I thought..."

The ethos of "true metal" and the dichotomy between "true metal" and "false metal", as well as the phrase "Death to false metal" is prominently featured in Into Glory Ride, where both are printed on the album sleeve. Writers and media outlets observed that "true metal" aligns with Manowar themselves, and the authentic characteristic of heavy metal music, whereas "false metal" aligns with commercial motivations and poseurs. Jon Zazula, founder of Megaforce Records was quoted as saying "This is Manowar, not Men at Work" by Kerrang! in 1983. Friedman would later disown the dichotomy between "true metal" and "false metal", stating it "was the worst thing Joey ever said and it did set us up for humiliation in the end".

== Songs ==
=== Side one ===
==== "Warlord" ====
"Warlord" is a song about a biker riding around and having sex with girls. The song starts with two people making love, but are quickly disturbed by the girl's parents including a broken escape by the young male protagonist. The main subject of "Warlord", the biker is said to be also watching television and seeing an appeal for aid in another part of the world; The biker disparages the appeal for aid, declaring "stop sending money; send 'em all a bomb". Some authors claim that Manowar in "Warlord" channels the essence of a working-class biker, which may have likely resonated with metal fans of the time. Phil Freeman, writing for Burning Ambulance asserts that biker culture is one of Manowar's primary themes in their music. Others claim that the lyrical content of "Warlord" manifests a degree of hypermasculinity and misogyny.

In 1996, the band's eighth album Louder Than Hell the opening track from the album called “Return of the Warlord,” is a sequel to the song “Warlord”.

==== "Secret of Steel" ====
"Secret of Steel" represents the continuation and refinement of the power metal style, that Manowar first explored with the eponymous closing track to their 1982 debut album Battle Hymns. Some music writers observed the song to be a tribute to the 1982 film Conan The Barbarian. According to Freeman and Burning Ambulance, Manowar frequently employ steel as a recurring metaphor, for several of their songs. "Secret of Steel" is their first song whose title is connected with the word "steel".

The song has also been described as an ode to sword and sorcery stories, as well as having a doomy atmosphere. The song also heavily features a choir, and guitar works of Ross "The Boss" Friedman.

==== "Gloves of Metal" ====
An anthemic heavy metal and power metal song, "Gloves of Metal" is about being a warrior of metal, dressed in leather, studs and spikes. The song also draws on the imagery of sword and sorcery's barbarians and heavy armored army slowly marching forward. A major characteristic of "Gloves of Metal" is the slow, pacing rhythm throughout the song. Some writers have noted the singing of Eric Adams in the song as being powerful and operatic. The lyrics mentions the name "metal kings", which would become one of their well known nicknames and later inspire the title of their sixth studio album Kings Of Metal. Composed by Friedman and DeMaio, Friedman wrote the riff with a modified guitar tuning for "Gloves of Metal", where every string in the guitar are in standard tuning, but only the sixth string is in C#.

Manowar filmed their first official music video for "Gloves of Metal" in 1983. The music video features shots of leather-clad warriors riding on horseback through the forest, Manowar miming the studio recording as if it was a live performance, and fighting and victory scenes. In 2000, the German web magazine Vampster named the video "one of the most iconic that the metal scene has ever seen", and described both the music video and the "best-known" song as "[getting] its power from its slow pace". Vampster deemed the music video complementary to the album artwork of Into Glory Ride. In 2014, VH1 ranked the song 'Gloves of Metal' as the 6th greatest heavy metal song with the word "metal" in the title.

==== "Gates of Valhalla" ====
"Gates of Valhalla" is a Norse-influenced heavy metal song about being a Viking warrior fighting and dying for glory in the afterlife, a fantasy-based heroic mythos that incorporates elements of Viking culture. The song is one of Manowar's first ballads and prominently features "histronic" singing vocals and melancholic lyrics expressing a final battle of a Viking and being sent to Valhalla upon his death: "With sword in hand, I scream the final battle cry". Some music writers consider Manowar to be pioneers of Viking metal, calling them "forefathers" due to the lyrical content of "Gates of Valhalla" among other songs.

=== Side two ===
==== "Hatred" ====
"Hatred" is a heavy metal song with doom metal influences. The song is described as having an aggressive, dark and doom rhythm with "strange" dissonant guitars, along with varying rhythms that becomes atmospherically dense. The song's name is screamed twice in succession in the chorus. Music writers have described Eric Adams' screams in "Hatred" as "merciless" and the song as "sluggish", and full of "aggressiveness" and "measured grind" with its gory lyrics.

==== "Revelation (Death's Angel)" ====
"Revelation (Death's Angel)" references the New Testament's vision of the final Apocalypse, as told in the Book of Revelation. British sociologist Karl Spracklen observes that Manowar uses this reference to turn the morality tale into a "glory of the final battle against Satan", where the lyrics reject the Satanism of heavy metal in favor of an idea that resembles the Victorian era religious movement Muscular Christianity. The song features archetypical heavy metal characteristics such as a galloping rhythm and was described as having an "almost majestic atmosphere" by some music writers. Music writers have also noted the refrain of the song being melodic and evoking powerful vivid imagery and theme, describing the vocals as "full" and "emotional", while some have described the songwriting quality as "excellent".

==== "March for Revenge (By the Soldiers of Death)" ====
The song describes the revenge of soldiers of death, describing their battles, wars and accomplishments filled with revenge after the fallen soldiers, who have died in battle: "Let revenge be sweet, for when we march, your sword rides with me". Writers and music outlets such as Kerrang! note the recurring theme of "rape and pillage" being very prominent in the song, quoting the lyrics: "maim and kill them, take the women and children". Some reviewers argue that the song is "a perfect successor" of the title track of Manowar's debut album Battle Hymns, "Battle Hymn", observing that "March for Revenge" follows the similar musical structure as the latter.

== Release ==
Into Glory Ride was released in July 1983 by Megaforce Records in the United States, and Music for Nations for the rest of the world. Manowar appeared on a Nickelodeon talk show Livewire in 1983 to promote their album Into Glory Ride. Manowar performed two songs live, "Gloves of Metal" and "Revelation (Death's Angel)". Members of the band, dressed in barbarian warrior attire in a similar manner as the promoted album's artwork, took questions from an audience of teenagers, parents, and grandparents.

=== Critical reception ===
Professional ratings
Review scores
Source	Rating
AllMusic	3/5 stars
Collector's Guide to Heavy Metal	7/10
Metal Forces	6/10
The Encyclopedia of Popular Music	3/5 stars

Into Glory Ride received mixed to positive receptions among writers and critics. In November 1983, Metal Forces writer Bernard Doe describes the album as "weak and quite tame" compared to the "tough macho image" the band portrayed. Referencing the phrase "Death to false metal" as printed in the sleeve notes, Doe bitingly implies that Manowar is the "false metal", owing to the macho image he considered as "fake". While lauding the musicianship of Eric Adams and Ross the Boss, naming "Warlord" and "Revelation (Death's Angel)" as exemplary tracks, Doe noted that Into Glory Ride is an improvement from their previous debut album Battle Hymns. Writing for AllMusic, Steve Huey described Into Glory Ride as "murky and unfocused" but observed that some songs are strong enough to be "Manowar standards".

In 2000, sociologist Deena Weinstein named Into Glory Ride as one of the "100 Definitive Metal Albums" to listen to in her book Heavy Metal: The Music and Its Culture. In the same year, the German online magazine Vampster described Into Glory Ride as "an absolute killer" and lamented that after the album, "MANOWAR will never write such an album again - not even remotely. ... no band has managed to create a comparable work [to Into Glory Ride]". The online magazine PowerMetal.de rated the album 9.32 stars out of 10 stars and praised the album for its passion for "myths and legends", musicianship, speed, and aggression, declaring that "MANOWAR have remained absolutely true to each other with the disc".

In 2005, Into Glory Ride was ranked number 444 in Rock Hard magazine's book Best of Rock & Metal: Die 500 stärksten Scheiben aller Zeiten. In 2006, the online magazine Metalfan.nl rated the album 94 out of 100 points, calling Into Glory Ride an "almost entirely epic album, further developing the aspects of the debut's best songs ... A top record from a top band."

=== 2019 remixed version: Into Glory Ride: Imperial Edition MMXIX ===
On 29 March 2019, Into Glory Ride was remixed from the original multitrack recordings and released as Into Glory Ride: Imperial Edition MMXIX. The album was remixed at Joey DeMaio's Valhalla Studios in Owasco, New York. The band stated that they had been "forced into a somewhat rushed and compromised production" during the original recording. The album artwork of Into Glory Ride: Imperial Edition MMXIX differs from the original album artwork, as it includes an artwork by the artist Ken Kelly, depicting a warrior riding a golden chariot with horses.

In 2019, the Greek online magazine Metal Invader described Into Glory Ride as "one of the masterpieces of a band that influenced the Metal firm as little as possible... So they deserve our respect...". Reviewing for the Imperial Edition, Metal Invader asserted that the 2019 version "deserves to be next to the classic since it brings to the surface many new elements in terms of sound."

== Track listing ==
All songs written by Joey DeMaio, except where noted.

Side one
No.	Title	Length
1.	"Warlord"	4:15
2.	"Secret of Steel" (Ross the Boss, DeMaio)	5:50
3.	"Gloves of Metal" (Ross the Boss, DeMaio)	5:25
4.	"Gates of Valhalla"	7:12

Side two
No.	Title	Length
1.	"Hatred"	7:42
2.	"Revelation (Death's Angel)"	6:31
3.	"March for Revenge (by the Soldiers of Death)"	8:31
Total length:		45:26

== Personnel ==
Personnel per Megaforce Records and Music For Nations.

Manowar

- Eric Adams – vocals
- Ross the Boss – guitars, keyboards
- Joey DeMaio – bass, bass pedals
- Scott Columbus – drums, percussion

Production

- Jon Mathias – producer, engineer
- John Petre – assistant engineer
- Joe Brescio – mastering
- Dennis "Snake" Dragone, Armond "The Arm" Biondi, Michael "Moto" Malvasio, Anthony Chiofalo – technicians
- Barbata Cesiro – coordinator
- Geoffrey Hargrave Thomas – art direction, illustrations (photo)
- Melissa Chatain – art supervision
- Jay Bergen – management, representation

== Cover versions ==
- British metal band Solstice covered "Gloves of Metal" for their reissue of the 1996 EP Halycon.
- American grindcore band Anal Cunt (credited as AxCx) and musician Phil Anselmo covered "Gloves of Metal" for the band's album 40 More Reasons to Hate Us in 1996.

== Sources ==
- Bonutto, Dante (July 28, 1983). "Male Oriented Rock: Manowar sets their sight on glory". Kerrang!. No. 47. Kerrang!.
- Doe, Bernard (August 1983). "Manowar - Into Glory Ride". Metal Forces (1).
- Dome, Malcolm (June 29, 2024). "How Manowar delivered death to false metal with Hail To England". Louder Sound. Metal Hammer.
- Huey, Steve. "Review of Into Glory Ride". AllMusic. AllMusic.
- Megaforce Records (1983). Into Glory Ride (LP sleeve). MANOWAR. New York City: Megaforce Records, Inc. MRI 169-666.
- Music for Nations (1983). Into Glory Ride (LP sleeve). MANOWAR. London, England: Music for Nations. MFN 6.
- Larkin, Colin (2006). The Encyclopedia of Popular Music. Vol. 5 (4th ed.). London, England: Muze and Oxford University Press. ISBN 978-0-19-531373-4.
- Popoff, Martin (November 1, 2005). The Collector's Guide to Heavy Metal: Volume 2: The Eighties. Burlington, Ontario, Canada: Collector's Guide Publishing. ISBN 978-1894959315.
- Rensen, Michael, ed. (2005). Best of Rock & Metal - Die 500 stärksten Scheiben aller Zeiten (in German). Rock Hard. ISBN 3-89880-517-4.
- Spracklen, Karl (May 11, 2020). "Chapter 6: Manowar: True Metal Warriors". Metal Music and the reimagining of masculinity, place, race and nation. Emerald Publishing Limited. ISBN 9781838674434.
- Weinstein, Deena (2000). Heavy Metal: The Music and Its Culture. New York: Da Capo Press. ISBN 0306809702.
