= Eric Adams (musician) =

American heavy metal singer

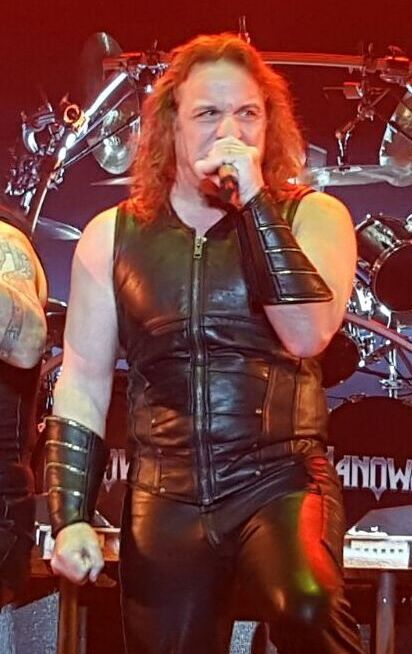
- Adams in 2016

Background information
- Born: Louis Marullo; July 12, 1952 (age 74); Auburn, New York, U.S.
- Genres: Heavy metal, power metal
- Occupation: Singer
- Years active: 1965–present
- Member of: Manowar
- Formerly of: Looks

Louis Marullo (born July 12, 1952), known professionally as Eric Adams, is an American singer who has been the frontman of the heavy metal band Manowar since its inception in 1980. Previously, he sang for the group Looks, which also included childhood friend and future Manowar bassist Joey DeMaio. His stage name is a combination of the names of his sons, Eric and Adam.

== Early life and education ==
Louis Marullo was born in Auburn, New York. He first showed interest in music when he was nine years old, playing the guitar. When asked about his musical training, he said, "I took one voice lesson in my life. (Laughs) He taught me the correct way to breathe, and from there I took off and I went to "the school of hardknocks" and took the rest of my lessons myself!"

== Career ==
While a teenager, Marullo and some classmates formed a garage band, The Kids, in 1965. The group performed shows in the mid-1960s, with songs generally focusing on childhood love. The band released the song "Lovin' Everyday" in 1965. It was released as a single for their 1966 album Class of '66.

In 1980, Marullo joined the newly founded band Manowar and has been the lead vocalist since. Ross the Boss proposed to him to use a stage name, and he chose "Eric Adams" as an homage to his sons Eric and Adam.

Adams can also play guitar and drums; in his hunting DVD, Wild Life and Wild Times, he plays guitar in the soundtrack.

In July 2011, Adrien Begrand wrote about him: "They (Manowar) have one of the most likeable, charismatic frontmen in the genre".

When asked about the band's relationships with present and former band members, he remarked that previous band members remain on good terms with the band, sometimes even contributing instruments to new albums.

Eric Adams can hold high note screams for 30 seconds at Manowar shows. Adams's main vocal influence is Ian Gillan. Adams declared in an interview that he used to go to every Deep Purple show as a young man because he loved Gillan's voice. However, he also worked to create his own, personal style. In his prime, his voice covered more than four octaves, from bass G1 to the soprano C6. As Adams has aged, his vocal high end has decreased, so recent Manowar albums are tuned lower than earlier albums.

== Personal life ==
Adams is a passionate fan of hunting. In an interview with Metal Rules, he stated, "I'm a big time bow hunter and I'm a New York State instructor for bow hunting."

Adams has two sons, Eric and Adam, who are the inspiration for his stage name.

== Discography ==
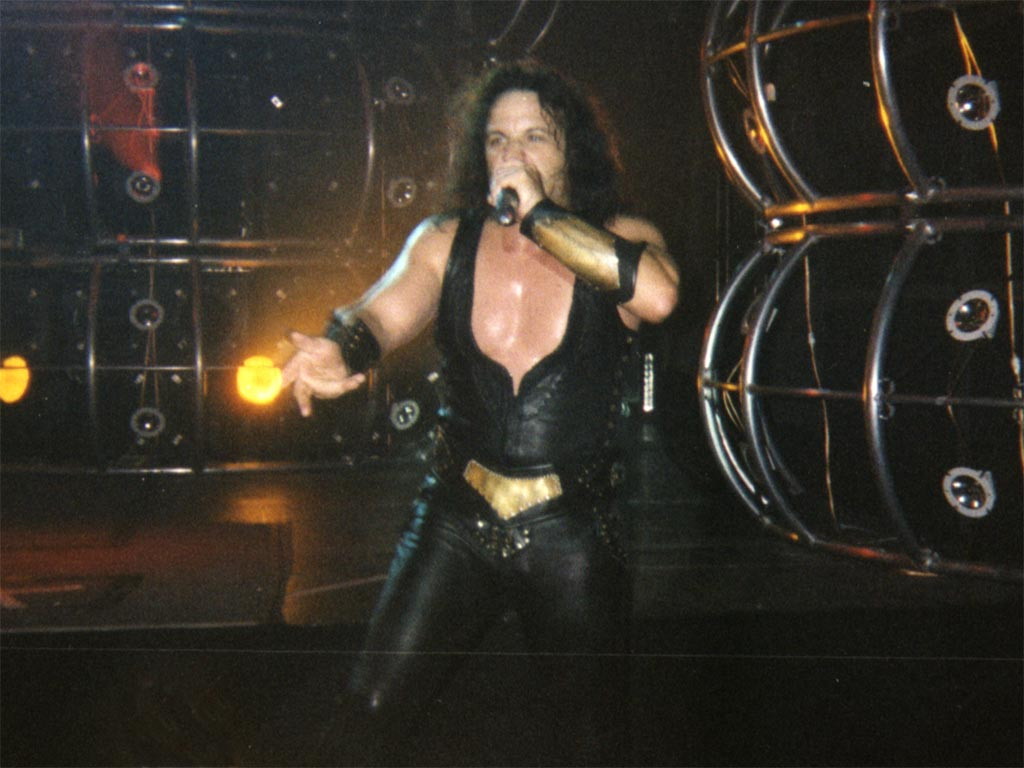
Adams performing in 2002

For a comprehensive list, see Manowar discography.

with Manowar

- Battle Hymns (1982)
- Into Glory Ride (1983)
- Hail to England (1984)
- Sign of the Hammer (1984)
- Fighting the World (1987)
- Kings of Metal (1988)
- The Triumph of Steel (1992)
- Louder Than Hell (1996)
- Warriors of the World (2002)
- Gods of War (2007)
- Thunder in the Sky EP (2009)
- Battle Hymns MMXI (2010)
- The Lord of Steel (2012)
- Kings of Metal MMXIV (2014)

== See also ==
- David Shankle Group
- Loudest band
- Magic Circle Music
