= Hailstorm (Ross the Boss album) =

Studio album by Ross the Boss
- Released: October 29, 2010
- Recorded: V3Studio, Twin Terror Studio, New York, Vocallessons.de Studio and The "Reichenbvitker", Germany
- Genre: Heavy metal
- Length: 45:16
- Label: AFM
- Producer: Ross the Boss (band)

Ross the Boss chronology
New Metal Leader (2008)	Hailstorm (2010)	By Blood Sworn (2018)

Professional ratings
Review scores
Source	Rating
Allmusic	4/5 stars
Classic Rock	7/10 stars
Danger Dog	4.75/5
SMN News	8.5/10

Hailstorm is the second album recorded by guitarist Ross "the Boss" Friedman and his German band under the name "Ross the Boss".

== Reception ==
The album was released in the fall of 2010 to positive reviews. A very positive review came from SMNnews, which said: "The band explore some good German power metal territory with its soaring guitar leads, precise drumming, catchy, anthemic choruses and melodic song structures. The band is more self-assured on their second release. Song writing contributions from the rest of the band has established themselves as important members of the band and not just Ross' hired hands", concluding that if you liked New Metal Leader, you'll definitely like Hailstorm. A reviewer from Danger Dog mentioned: "Continuing commentaries across the web have been suggesting that both the former and present Boss albums are what more recent Manowar works should or could have been like."

== Track listing ==
All lyrics are written by Patrick Fuchs.

No.	Title	Music	Length
1.	"I.A.G." (Instrumental)	Carsten Kettering	1:15
2.	"Kingdom Arise"	Ross Friedman, Fuchs	4:57
3.	"Dead Man's Curve"	Kettering, Fuchs	3:33
4.	"Hailstorm"	Friedman, Fuchs	3:52
5.	"Burn Alive"	Friedman, Fuchs	4:11
6.	"Crom"	Kettering, Fuchs	3:29
7.	"Behold the Kingdom"	Kettering, Fuchs	5:28
8.	"Great Gods Glorious" (Instrumental)	Friedman	3:16
9.	"Shining Path"	Friedman, Fuchs	4:36
10.	"Among the Ruins"	Friedman, Fuchs	4:30
11.	"Empire's Anthem"	Kettering, Fuchs, Matthias Mayer	6:18

Limited Edition Digipak Bonus Track
No.	Title	Music	Length
12.	"Vindicator"	Friedman, Fuchs	4:02

== Personnel ==
Band

- Ross the Boss – guitar, keyboards, engineer
- Patrick Fuchs – vocals, guitar
- Carsten Kettering – bass
- Matthias "Matze" Mayer – drums

Miscellaneous staff

- Matze Mayer – editing
- Ross the Boss – recording, editing
- Bella Hepp – engineering (assistant), editing
- Dimitar Nikolov – cover art, artwork
- Oliver Szczypula – engineer, editing
- John Rup, Matze Mayer, Bella Hep – engineers
- Achim Köhler – engineer, mixing, and mastering at Indiscreet Audio, Stuttgart, Germany
- Antonio Raimondo – editing
- Ralf Stöcklmayer – orchestral arrangements (tracks 1, 11)
