= The Sons of Odin =

2006 EP by Manowar

EP by Manowar
- Released: 2006
- Genre: Heavy metal, power metal
- Length: 24:14
- Label: Magic Circle Music
- Producer: Joey DeMaio

Manowar chronology
The Dawn of Battle (2002)	The Sons of Odin (2006)	Gods of War (2007)

Professional ratings
Review scores
Source	Rating
Allmusic	3/5 stars

The Sons of Odin is a 2006 EP by the American heavy metal band Manowar.

== Track listing ==
No.	Title	Length
1.	"The Ascension" (Live)	2:48
2.	"King of Kings" (Live)	4:24
3.	"Odin" (Immortal version)	3:44
4.	"Gods of War" (Immortal version)	6:52
5.	"The Sons of Odin" (Immortal version)	6:26

- The "Immortal Edition" also included a bonus DVD with many features. Included on this DVD was a 5.1-Surround Sound mix of the EP.
- The DVD includes highlights of the Manowar convention, an annual meeting of Manowar fans worldwide, a trailer of the Earthshaker DVD and interviews with the band.
