= Warriors of the World =

Studio album by Manowar
- Released: June 4, 2002
- Recorded: 2002
- Genre: Heavy metal; power metal
- Length: 47:39
- Label: Nuclear Blast
- Producer: Manowar

Manowar chronology
Hell on Stage (1999)	Warriors of the World (2002)	The Dawn of Battle (2002)

Professional ratings
Review scores
Source	Rating
AllMusic	2.5/5 stars
laut.de	2/5 stars
Sputnikmusic	3.5/5 stars

Warriors of the World is the ninth studio album by the American heavy metal band Manowar, released on June 4, 2002. It includes the Puccini aria "Nessun Dorma".

== Track listing ==
All songs written by Joey DeMaio, except where noted.

No.	Title	Writer(s)	Length
1.	"Call to Arms"		5:30
2.	"The Fight for Freedom"	Karl Logan, DeMaio	4:30
3.	"Nessun Dorma"	Giuseppe Adami, Giacomo Puccini, Renato Simoni	3:26
4.	"Valhalla" (instrumental)		0:35
5.	"Swords in the Wind"	Logan, DeMaio	5:19
6.	"An American Trilogy"	Mickey Newbury	4:16
7.	"The March" (instrumental)		4:00
8.	"Warriors of the World United"		5:51
9.	"Hand of Doom"		5:49
10.	"House of Death"		4:22
11.	"Fight Until We Die"		4:01
Total length:			47:39

Japan bonus tracks
No.	Title	Length
12.	"Kill with Power (live at Gods of Metal, Italy, June 6, 1999)"	4:34
Total length:		52:21

Gold edition bonus tracks
No.	Title	Length
12.	"I Believe"	4:06
13.	"The Dawn of Battle"	6:53
Total length:		58:57

Gold edition enhanced video content
No.	Title	Length
12.	"Warriors of the World United"	5:49
13.	"I Believe"	4:02
Total length:		57:49

== Personnel ==
- Eric Adams – vocals
- Karl Logan – guitars, keyboards
- Joey DeMaio – bass, keyboards
- Scott Columbus – drums

=== Additional personnel ===
- Ken Kelly – cover artwork

== Charts ==
Chart (2002)	Peak position
Austrian Albums (Ö3 Austria)	6
Finnish Albums (Suomen virallinen lista)	17
French Albums (SNEP)	40
German Albums (Offizielle Top 100)	2
Hungarian Albums (MAHASZ)	32
Italian Albums (FIMI)	23
Japanese Albums (Oricon)	55
Norwegian Albums (VG-lista)	14
Swedish Albums (Sverigetopplistan)	13
Swiss Albums (Schweizer Hitparade)	35
US Independent Albums (Billboard)	42

== Certifications ==
Region	Certification	Certified units/sales
Germany (BVMI)	Gold	150,000^{^}
^{^} Shipments figures based on certification alone.
