= The Kingdom of Steel =

Greatest hits album by Manowar
- Released: 1998
- Genres: Heavy metal, power metal
- Length: 73:18
- Label: MCA Records

Manowar chronology
Hell on Wheels (1997)	The Kingdom of Steel (1998)	Steel Warriors (1998)

Professional ratings
Review scores
Source	Rating
Allmusic	3.5/5 stars

The Kingdom of Steel: The Very Best of Manowar is a compilation album by the heavy metal band Manowar. It was released Feb 2, 1999 by MCA International.

== Track listing ==
1. "Manowar"
2. "Blood of my Enemies"
3. "Kill With Power"
4. "Sign of the Hammer"
5. "Courage"
6. "Fighting the World"
7. "Kings of Metal"
8. "Metal Warriors"
9. "Heart of Steel"
10. "Number 1"
11. "The Gods Made Heavy Metal"
12. "Hail and Kill"
13. "Warlord"
14. "The Power"
15. "Battle Hymn"
16. "The Crown and the Ring (Lament of the Kings)"

== Charts ==
Chart (1998)	Peak position
German Albums (Offizielle Top 100)	100
