= The Triumph of Steel =

- Cover art by Ken Kelly

Studio album by Manowar
- Released: September 29, 1992
- Recorded: Haus Wahnfried, New York
- Genre: Heavy metal; power metal; Speed metal
- Length: 69:09
- Label: Atlantic
- Producer: Manowar, John Pettigrass

Manowar chronology
Kings of Metal (1988)	The Triumph of Steel (1992)	The Hell of Steel: Best of Manowar (1994)

Professional ratings
Review scores
Source	Rating
AllMusic	4/5 stars
Collector's Guide to Heavy Metal	9/10

The Triumph of Steel is the seventh studio album by American heavy metal band Manowar, released in 1992. It is the only Manowar album to feature guitarist David Shankle and drummer Kenny Earl "Rhino" Edwards. The cover art was illustrated by Ken Kelly.

== Album content ==
"Achilles, Agony and Ecstasy in Eight Parts" is the longest (28 minutes and 38 seconds) and most complex Manowar song, and probably an anticipation of a concept album that was never accomplished. Because of its Homeric content, "Achilles, Agony and Ecstasy in Eight Parts" has attracted the attention of a group of scholars at Bologna University in Italy. Mrs. Eleonora Cavallini, Professor in Classics, has written about this song:

"Joey DeMaio’s lyrics imply a careful and scrupulous reading of the Iliad. The songwriter has focused his attention essentially on the crucial fight between Hector and Achilles, has paraphrased some passages of the poem adapting them to the melodic structure with a certain fluency and partly reinterpreting them, but never altering or upsetting Homer’s storyline. The purpose of the lyrics (and of the music as well) is to evoke some characteristic Homeric sceneries: the raging storm of the battle, the barbaric, ferocious exultance of the winner, the grief and anguish of the warrior who feels death impending over him. The whole action hinges upon Hector and Achilles, who are represented as specular characters, divided by an irreducible hatred and yet destined to share a similar destiny. Both are caught in the moment of the greatest exaltation, as they savagely rejoice for the blood of their killed enemies, but also in the one of the extreme pain, when the daemon of war finally pounces on them. Furthermore, differently than in the irreverent and iconoclastic movie Troy, in "Achilles, Agony and Ecstasy in Eight Parts", the divine is a constant and ineluctable presence, determining human destinies with inscrutable and steely will, and, despite the generic reference to 'the gods', the real master of human lives is Zeus, the only God to whom both Hector and Achilles address their prayers"

== Track listing ==
All songs written by Joey DeMaio except where noted.

No.	Title	Writer(s)	Length
1.	"Achilles, Agony and Ecstasy in Eight Parts": Prelude; I. Hector Storms the Wall; II. The Death of Patroclus; III. Funeral March; IV. Armor of the Gods; V. Hector's Final Hour; VI. Death Hector's Reward; VII. The Desecration of Hector's Body; A. Part 1; B. Part 2; VIII. The Glory of Achilles"		28:37
2.	"Metal Warriors"		3:54
3.	"Ride the Dragon"	David Shankle, DeMaio	4:29
4.	"Spirit Horse of the Cherokee"		6:00
5.	"Burning"	Shankle, DeMaio	5:08
6.	"The Power of Thy Sword"		7:50
7.	"The Demon's Whip"	Shankle, DeMaio	7:45
8.	"Master of the Wind"	Shankle, DeMaio	5:26
Total length:			69:09

== Personnel ==
=== Manowar ===
- Eric Adams – vocals
- David Shankle – guitars, acoustic guitar, classical guitar
- Joey DeMaio – bass, 4-string, 8-string bass, piccolo bass, bass pedals
- Kenny Earl "Rhino" Edwards – drums, percussion

=== Production ===
- John Pettigrass – associate producer
- Rich Breen – engineer
- Dave Kresl, Doug McBride, Hank Neuberger, Dan Stout, Stefon Taylor, Bruce Breckenfeld, Andrew Rubin – mixing at Air Waves Studio, Chicago
- John McCortney, Paul Grigonis, Ehab Haddad – digital editing and transfers at C.R.C., Chicago
- Howie Weinberg – mastering at Masterdisk, New York
- Silvio "The Don" Bonvini – production co-ordination

== Charts ==
Chart (1992)	Peak position
Finnish Albums (The Official Finnish Charts)	22
German Albums (Offizielle Top 100)	8
Japanese Albums (Oricon)	68
Swiss Albums (Schweizer Hitparade)	20
US Heatseekers Albums (Billboard)	22

== Certifications ==
Region	Certification	Certified units/sales
Germany (BVMI)	Gold	250,000^{^}
Spain (PROMUSICAE)	Gold	50,000^{^}
^{^} Shipments figures based on certification alone.
