= Ken Kelly (artist) =

American artist (1946–2022)

Kenneth William "Ken" Kelly (May 19, 1946 – June 2, 2022) was an American fantasy artist. Over his 50-year career, he focused in particular on paintings in the sword and sorcery and heroic fantasy subgenres.

== Biography ==
Kelly was born May 19, 1946 in New London, Connecticut. Kelly was the nephew of Frank Frazetta's wife Eleanor "Ellie" Frazetta (née Kelly; 1935–2009).

Early in his career he was able to study the paintings by Frank Frazetta in the latter's studio.. He served in the Marines until 1968, and soon after became a professional artist. In the early 1970s he did a couple of cover paintings for Castle of Frankenstein magazine. Throughout the 1970s he was one of the foremost cover artists on Warren Publishing's Creepy and Eerie magazines.

He depicted Conan the Barbarian, Tarzan and the rock acts Kiss, Manowar, Sleepy Hollow, Rainbow, and Ace Frehley.

His work often portrays exotic, enchanted locales and primal battlefields. He developed the artwork for Coheed and Cambria's album Good Apollo, I'm Burning Star IV, Volume Two: No World for Tomorrow, and a painting of his was used as the cover art for Alabama Thunderpussy's 2007 release, Open Fire. In 2012, one of Kelly's paintings was used for the cover of Electric Magma's 12" vinyl release Canadian Samurai II.

Kelly was a guest at the Kiss by Monster Mini Golf course in Las Vegas, Nevada, doing autograph signings of prints for the classic Kiss albums he drew cover artwork for.

Ken Kelly died on June 2, 2022, at the age of 76.

== Notable album artwork ==
- Destroyer (1976) by Kiss
- Rising (1976) by Rainbow
- Love Gun (1977) by Kiss
- Fighting the World (1987) by Manowar
- Kings of Metal (1988) by Manowar
- The Triumph of Steel (1992) by Manowar
- Louder than Hell (1996) by Manowar
- Gods of War (2007) by Manowar
- Good Apollo, I'm Burning Star IV, Volume Two: No World for Tomorrow (2007) by Coheed and Cambria
- The Lord of Steel (2012) by Manowar
- Space Invader (2014) by Ace Frehley

== Games ==
- Witchaven (1995, cover illustration) (video game)
- Witchaven II: Blood Vengeance (1996, cover illustration) (video game)
- Conan: Adventures in an Age Undreamed Of (2016, Modiphius Entertainment, inner pages illustrations by Ken Kelly, among others) (tabletop roleplaying game)

== Toys ==
- Micronauts (1979 packaging art) by MEGO
- Micronauts (2016, packaging art) by Hasbro
- Roboskull MKII (2021, 2022, packaging art) by SKELETRON
