= Sign of the Hammer =

Studio album by Manowar
- Released: October 15, 1984
- Recorded: November 1983 – 1984
- Studios: Phase One, Toronto; The Manor, Oxfordshire
- Genres: Heavy metal; power metal
- Length: 40:29
- Labels: 10; Virgin
- Producers: Jack Richardson; Tony Platt

Manowar chronology
Hail to England (1984)	Sign of the Hammer (1984)	Fighting the World (1987)

Singles from Sign of the Hammer
- 1. "All Men Play on 10" Released: September 1984 (UK)

Sign of the Hammer is the fourth studio album by the American heavy metal band Manowar, released in October 1984 by 10/Virgin Records.

== Background ==
According to guitarist Ross "The Boss" Friedman, some of the songs for Sign of the Hammer were recorded at the same sessions that produced the preceding album Hail to England at Phase One Studios in Toronto, Canada between 1983 and winter 1984 with producer Jack Richardson.

=== Songs ===
"Thor (The Powerhead)" is about the Norse god Thor destroying what he considers evils of the world. Written by Joey DeMaio, it is one of the songs from Manowar that explores Norse mythology, which would be recurring throughout their repertoire. Some members of the band, including Friedman, have expressed enthusiasm for the titular character.

"Guyana (Cult of the Damned)" is a song about the 1978 mass suicide led by Jim Jones of the Peoples Temple group, at Jonestown, northwestern Guyana.

== Release and reception ==
Professional ratings
Review scores
Source	Rating
AllMusic	2.5/5 stars
Collector's Guide to Heavy Metal	9/10
Encyclopedia of Popular Music	3/5 stars
Rock Hard	9.5/10

Sign of the Hammer was released on October 15, 1984 by 10 Records and Virgin Records.

Writing for Classic Rock, Ken "Sleazegrinder" McIntyre was favorable, calling the album "gonzo metal", highlighting tracks like "Guyana (Cult of the Damned)", "All Men Play on 10" and "Animals". McIntyre observes that in "Guyana", Eric Adams treats the "sordid affair" as a "night in the opera". McIntyre considers "Animals" a glam metal track, which he asserts that it challenges the ethos of "true metal" that Manowar championed. Similarly, Colin Larkin wrote that Sign of the Hammer contains accessible compositions and called the guitar works of Ross "The Boss" Friedman "excellent", rating the album three out of five stars.

Reviewing for AllMusic, Eduardo Rivadavia highlighted and was receptive to songs like "Thor (The Powerhead)", "The Oath" and "All Men Play on 10", but observed that the production of the album "sounded flat", and considered some of the songs to have "uneven songwriting".

Writing for Rock Hard, Frank Trojan asserts that Sign of the Hammer was a return to form for Manowar, comparing the album to their debut album Battle Hymns, highlighting the title track "Sign of the Hammer" and "Animals". Trojan observed that Manowar was becoming "too commercial" with the song "All Men Play on 10", but has praised the overall musicianship of the band. In 2005, Sign of the Hammer was ranked number 418 in Rock Hard magazine's book The 500 Greatest Rock & Metal Albums of All Time.

== Track listing ==
All songs written by Joey DeMaio, except where noted.

No.	Title	Writer(s)	Length
1.	"All Men Play on 10"		4:01
2.	"Animals"		3:33
3.	"Thor (The Powerhead)"		5:23
4.	"Mountains"		7:39
5.	"Sign of the Hammer"		4:18
6.	"The Oath"	Ross the Boss, DeMaio	4:54
7.	"Thunderpick" (instrumental)		3:31
8.	"Guyana (Cult of the Damned)"		7:10
Total length:			40:29

== Personnel ==
Manowar

- Eric Adams – vocals
- Ross the Boss – guitars, keyboards
- Joey DeMaio – bass, bass pedals
- Scott Columbus – drums, percussion

Production

- Jack Richardson – producer
- Tony Platt – producer in "Sign of the Hammer", mixing
- Arun Chakraverty – mastering
- Rian Hughes – sleeve design
- Lucifer Burns, Anthony "Chio" Chiofalo, Armand "The Arm" Biondi – technicians
- Jay Bergen – management (representation)

== Charts ==
Chart (1984)	Peak position
Swedish Albums (Sverigetopplistan)	34
UK Albums (Official Charts)	73

== Sources ==
- Bonutto, Dante (April 11, 2007). "Manowar: Hammer Of The Metal Gods". LouderSound. LouderSound.
- McIntyre, Ken (June 18, 2016). "Flash Metal Suicide: Manowar - Sign of the Hammer". Classic Rock. Future plc.
- Larkin, Colin (2006). The Encyclopedia of Popular Music. Vol. 5 (4th ed.). London, England: Muze and Oxford University Press. ISBN 978-0-19-531373-4.
- Petiteau, Frantz-E. (2014). Metal et fantasy, Volume 1. Vol. 1. ISBN 9782357796065.
- Popoff, Martin (November 1, 2005). The Collector's Guide to Heavy Metal: Volume 2: The Eighties. Collector's Guide Publishing. ISBN 978-1-894959-31-5.
- Spracklen, Karl (May 11, 2020). "Chapter 6: Manowar: True Metal Warriors". Metal Music and the reimagining of masculinity, place, race and nation. Emerald Publishing Limited. ISBN 9781838674434.
