= Battle Hymns (Manowar album) =

1982 album by Manowar

Studio album by Manowar
- Released: June 14, 1982
- Studio: Criteria (Miami)
- Genre: Heavy metal
- Length: 36:05
- Label: Liberty
- Producers: Joey DeMaio; Ross the Boss

Manowar chronology
| Manowar (1981) | Battle Hymns (1982) | Into Glory Ride (1983) |

Battle Hymns is the debut studio album by American heavy metal band Manowar, released in June 1982 by Liberty Records. It features the title track "Battle Hymn", and a song featuring a narration from actor Orson Welles, "Dark Avenger". Members of the band Ross "The Boss" Friedman and Joey DeMaio opted to produce the album as a team: the band, as a whole entity, would later assume production credits in succeeding albums.

At the time of its initial release, the album received negative reception. Some music publications did not consider Manowar to be a serious band, although few were favorable to the musicianship of Friedman and DeMaio in the album's songs. Over the years, Battle Hymns became highly influential for the power metal genre, which has since been acknowledged among critics and writers who were more favorable to the album. The album was re-recorded in 2010 as Battle Hymns MMXI.

== Background ==
Joey DeMaio and Ross the Boss met during the Heaven & Hell Tour of Black Sabbath. DeMaio worked on the fireworks of the concerts, and Ross the Boss was in the opening act Shakin' Street. Although DeMaio didn't like his band, he liked the performance of Ross the Boss and invited him to create a band of their own, which Ross accepted. The line-up was completed by Donnie Hamzik on drums and Louis Marullo, a friend of DeMaio, on vocals. Ross told him that the name would not work for a heavy metal band, that he should use a stage name instead. As his sons were named "Eric" and "Adam", Marullo took the name Eric Adams.

The name "Manowar", a contraction of "Man of war", was proposed by sound technician John "Dawk" Stillwell, while DeMaio and Ross the Boss were discussing possible names related to warfare. Despite the similarity, the name is not a reference to the man-of-war naval ships, used up to the 19th century. It was chosen simply because it meant "warrior".

== Recording and design ==
Initially, Eric Adams refused to scream in the songs, fearing that doing so may damage his voice. Joey DeMaio convinced him to do it, predicting that his musical career would not advance much unless he did it. He trained him on how to properly use the screaming technique and define his singing style.

Battle Hymns was recorded at Criteria Studios in Miami, Florida. Joey DeMaio recalled that Manowar used their stage equipment and played with a loud volume when recording the songs at the studio. DeMaio stated that this "drove everybody nuts" and caused some issues around the studio that a recording session for the Bee Gees who was "two studios away" had to stop. The album was produced by Ross "The Boss" Friedman and Joey DeMaio. In an August 1982 interview for Kerrang! magazine, Friedman commented on the production of the album: "Well, after all this time of making albums and being a victim of producers, I figured we should do it ourselves. And I think it worked out fine."

The album includes the song, "Manowar", opening the B-side. Although eponymous songs were frequent at the time, such as "Black Sabbath", "Motorhead" and "Iron Maiden", the "Manowar" song has lyrics that talk about the band itself.

The song "Dark Avenger" was composed with a narration in it. The band wanted to have a famous actor narrating it, and considered actors such as Vincent Price and James Earl Jones, and finally decided to call Orson Welles. The executive producer Bob Currie contacted Welles' management, who accepted the proposal. His arrival to the recording studio was met with fan frenzy, and he recorded two narration tracks. One of those tracks was used for "Dark Avenger", and the second would be used the following year for the "Defender" single'. Welles later recorded an intro tape for the band to use for live performances.

The song "William's Tale" is a cover of the finale of Gioachino Rossini's William Tell Overture arranged for solo bass guitar by Joey DeMaio. DeMaio stated in a Sounds interview in 1982 that he included the song "to tell the world that I am the fastest bass player in the world" and wanted to "get some of that technique out" after years of practicing.

The cover of the album, featuring a statue of an eagle, was done by the artist Gary Ruddell.

== Release and reception ==
Professional ratings
Review scores
| Source | Rating |
|---|---|
| AllMusic | 3/5 stars |
| Collector's Guide to Heavy Metal | 8/10 |
| The Encyclopedia of Popular Music | 4/5 stars |

Battle Hymns was released on June 14, 1982, by Liberty Records. The album was supported with a tour with Ted Nugent and Pat Travers, where Manowar was a supporting act. They were later "booted" out of that tour after they reportedly got more audience response than Nugent and Travers. The promotion and press interviews for the band and album Battle Hymns also included one of the earlier instances of Manowar exploring the ethos of "true metal": Joey DeMaio asserts in a 1982 Sounds interview: "American audiences don't know what true heavy metal is. They really don't have a taste of metal. They don't have Motörhead or anything like them", while Ross "The Boss" Friedman expressed disapproval for new wave and "bubblegum" music, and concern for the perceived decline of the "rock 'n' roll soul".

At the time of the release, the reception of the album was initially negative, and the band was at one point considered a novelty. Writing for Trouser Press in November 1982, Jon Young noted and praised the guitar works of Ross The Boss, but singled out other members for "[failing] to pack comparable punch", and the production for having the "sonic consistency of a cardboard". Similarly, Ethlie Ann Vare, for her syndicated column Rock On, in September 1982, remarked that Battle Hymns "is totally unlistenable for anyone but the most dedicated metallurgist" and "it'll make your eardrums bleed."

John Kordosh, writing for Creem magazine observed and contended that Manowar was a serious heavy metal band, in December 1982, emphasising the track "Metal Daze" and the title track "Battle Hymn", as highlights of the album, and favorably referred to Joey DeMaio as a "virtuoso" on the bass guitar, alongside Ross the Boss on electric guitar. Tim Sommer, writing for Sounds was cautiously favorable, writing that Battle Hymns is "a pretty good showcase of Manowar's mutant hard rock", describing it as "extreme, persistant stuff resounding with majesty, chops, and clarity". Sommer clarified that the songs were "sometimes great, occasionally, medium duff". As such, the album did not have noteworthy sales, awards, or recognitions.

Over the years, Battle Hymns strongly influenced heavy metal and power metal, and paved the way for Manowar's strong cult following, which musicians, critics and journalists have since acknowledged. Writing for AllMusic, Eduardo Rivadavia was favorable to the musicianship of Ross the Boss and Joey DeMaio, and called the debut album "a promising start" despite the perceived "heavy metal clichés" and "thin" music production. Music writer Colin Larkin named "Dark Avenger" and Orson Welles' narration, and the bass solo of "William's Tale" as highlights of Battle Hymns and remarked that Manowar was seemingly a "turbo-charged hybrid" of Ted Nugent and Black Sabbath. In 2021, Vince Neilstein from MetalSucks observed that Manowar "is obviously a huge influence in the power metalheads from Sweden" and further asserted that "Manowar is a great influence for almost all power metal bands that started in the last 25 years". Many journalists even consider it the first power metal album.

== Track listing ==
All tracks are written by Ross the Boss and Joey DeMaio, except where indicated.

Side one
| No. | Title | Writer(s) | Length |
|---|---|---|---|
| 1. | "Death Tone" | | 4:51 |
| 2. | "Metal Daze" | DeMaio | 4:20 |
| 3. | "Fast Taker" | | 3:56 |
| 4. | "Shell Shock" | | 4:07 |

Side two
| No. | Title | Writer(s) | Length |
|---|---|---|---|
| 5. | "Manowar" | | 3:38 |
| 6. | "Dark Avenger" | | 6:23 |
| 7. | "William's Tale" | Gioachino Rossini | 1:54 |
| 8. | "Battle Hymn" | | 6:56 |
| Total length: | | | 36:05 |

== Personnel ==
=== Manowar ===
- Eric Adams – vocals
- Ross the Boss – guitars, keyboards
- Joey DeMaio – bass, bass pedals
- Donnie Hamzik – drums, percussion

=== Additional personnel ===
- Orson Welles – narration on "Dark Avenger"

=== Production ===
- Mixed by Jon Mathias at Record Plant Studios, New York City
- Joey DeMaio, Ross the Boss – producers
- Joe Foglia – engineer
- Jim Sessody, John Agnello – assistant engineers
- Joe Breschio – mastering
- Bob Currie – executive producer
- Aucoin Management, Inc. – management
- Bill Burks, Brian J. Ames – art direction
- Gary Ruddell – Illustration

== 2010 re-recording – Battle Hymns MMXI ==
Battle Hymns MMXI

Studio album by Manowar
- Released: November 26, 2010
- Recorded: 2010
- Genres: Heavy metal, power metal
- Length: 48:45
- Label: Magic Circle Music
- Producer: Joey DeMaio

Manowar chronology
| Thunder in the Sky (2009) | Battle Hymns MMXI (2010) | The Lord of Steel (2012) |

In late 2010 it was announced that Manowar were to re-record Battle Hymns for a November 26 release. The album, Battle Hymns MMXI, was drummer Donnie Hamzik's first studio recording with Manowar since the original 1982 Battle Hymns release. Orson Welles having died 25 years before, the narration during "Dark Avenger" was recorded by Sir Christopher Lee. The album was promoted with the "Battle Hymns Tour", where they played all the songs from it.

Ross the Boss, who left the band in 1988 on bad terms, was not included in the making of the re-recorded album. He complained that good albums cannot be re-recorded, that he was left out of it, and that the songs were altered to accommodate Eric Adams' current singing style.

=== Track listing ===
All songs by Ross the Boss and Joey DeMaio, except where indicated.

Side one
| No. | Title | Writer(s) | Length |
|---|---|---|---|
| 1. | "Death Tone" | | 5:08 |
| 2. | "Metal Daze" | Joey DeMaio | 4:33 |
| 3. | "Fast Taker" | | 4:06 |
| 4. | "Shell Shock" | | 4:13 |
| 5. | "Manowar" | | 4:01 |
| 6. | "Dark Avenger" | | 6:24 |
| 7. | "William's Tale" | Gioachino Rossini | 1:53 |
| 8. | "Battle Hymn" | | 9:30 |
| 9. | "Fast Taker (Live)" | | 3:57 |
| 10. | "Death Tone (Live)" | | 5:00 |
| Total length: | | | 48:45 |

== Cover versions ==
- Thrash metal band Overkill covered the song "Death Tone" on their 1999 album Coverkill.
- Traditional metal band Seven Witches covered the song "Metal Daze" on their 1999 album Second War in Heaven.
- The song "Battle Hymn" has been covered by German heavy metal band Majesty.
- Swiss Heavy Metal band Burning Witches covered the song "Battle Hymn" on their 2020 album Dance With The Devil.
- Finnish symphonic power metal band Beast in Black covered the song "Battle Hymn" on their 2021 album Dark Connection.
- German band Tankard covered "Fast Taker" on the re-release of their album Disco Destroyer.
- American traditional metal band Slough Feg covered "Fast Taker" on a split single with Solstice.
