= Fighting the World =

- Cover art by Ken Kelly

Studio album by Manowar
- Released: February 17, 1987
- Recorded: 1986–1987
- Studios: Universal Recording, Chicago
- Genres: Heavy metal, power metal
- Length: 34:31
- Label: ATCO
- Producers: Manowar; Jason Flom (exec.)

Manowar chronology
| Sign of the Hammer (1984) | Fighting the World (1987) | Kings of Metal (1988) |

Singles from Fighting the World
- 1. "Blow Your Speakers" Released: November 30, 1986

Fighting the World is the fifth album by the American heavy metal band Manowar, released in February 1987 by ATCO Records. This was the first Manowar album to feature artwork by long-time collaborator Ken Kelly, and also one of the earliest heavy metal albums to be recorded and mixed entirely on digital equipment. Since Fighting the World, all Manowar album covers have been painted by Ken Kelly.

== Background ==
Fighting the World was the first Manowar album to be digitally recorded and mixed entirely with a 32-track digital machine at Universal Recording Studios in Chicago, Illinois.

The song "Defender" features a speech by American actor Orson Welles. The album was released two years after Welles died and is dedicated to him. The recording of Welles' speech was re-used from the original 1982 demo of the song. In the album notes, Manowar reportedly had at least 195 people in their acknowledgement list, including the "ladies auxiliary" and "medical staff".

== Release and reception ==
Professional ratings
Review scores
| Source | Rating |
|---|---|
| AllMusic | 3/5 stars |
| Collector's Guide to Heavy Metal | 9/10 |

Fighting the World was released in February 1987 by ATCO Records. Guitarist Ross "The Boss" Friedman recalled that Fighting the World was a commercial success.

Writing for AllMusic, Eduardo Rivadavia called Fighting the World a slight improvement from their preceding album Sign of the Hammer, highlighting songs like "Black Wind, Fire and Steel", "Holy War" and "Defender", but asserted that Manowar's signing into a major label made them a "sell-out" after upholding the ethos of "true metal" for the first few albums.

Writing for Classic Rock, Paul Elliott contended that while Fighting the World thrived with "gonzoid heavy metal anthems" and their "adversity", he observed that "Black Wind, Fire and Steel" may possibly influence the European style of power metal.

Reviewing for the boxed set Black Wind, Fire & Steel – The Atlantic Albums 1987–1992, Jon Deaux writes in All About the Rock that Fighting the World is one of the albums with "metal rock anthems... guaranteed to have your fist pumping whilst wearing your spiked leather wristbands", and praised "Defender" as "an absolute monster of a track".

== Track listing ==
All songs written by Joey DeMaio.

| No. | Title | Length |
|---|---|---|
| 1. | "Fighting the World" | 3:50 |
| 2. | "Blow Your Speakers" | 3:39 |
| 3. | "Carry On" | 4:12 |
| 4. | "Violence and Bloodshed" | 4:00 |
| 5. | "Defender" | 6:02 |
| 6. | "Drums of Doom" | 1:15 |
| 7. | "Holy War" | 4:44 |
| 8. | "Master of Revenge" | 1:34 |
| 9. | "Black Wind, Fire and Steel" | 5:15 |
| Total length: | | 34:31 |

== Personnel ==
Personnel per ATCO Records.

Manowar

- Eric Adams – vocals
- Ross the Boss – guitars, keyboards
- Joey DeMaio – four- and eight-string bass
- Scott Columbus – drums
- Orson Welles – guest voice on Defender

Production

- Richard Breen – engineer, mixing, Synclavier programming
- Vince Gutman – digital programming, recording and mixing supervision
- Howie Weinberg – mastering at Masterdisk, New York
- Jason Flom – executive producer

== Charts ==
| Chart (1987) | Peak position |
|---|---|
| Finnish Albums (The Official Finnish Charts) | 15 |
| Swedish Albums (Sverigetopplistan) | 27 |

== Certifications ==
| Region | Certification | Certified units/sales |
|---|---|---|
| Germany (BVMI) | Gold | 250,000^{^} |
| Spain (Promusicae) | Gold | 50,000^{^} |
^{^} Shipments figures based on certification alone.

== Cover versions ==
- "Fighting the World" was covered by German power metal band Mystic Prophecy as a bonus track on their album Regressus.
- "Black Wind, Fire and Steel" has been covered by Brazilian heavy metal band Immortal Choir, by Swedish punk band Venerea and by Spanish rock/punk band Reserva Dos, this last under the name "Viento negro, fuego y acero" (in Spanish).

== References in popular culture ==
- The cover is parodied in the Metalocalypse episode "Dethfashion". In the episode, Dethklok is visited by a sadistic fashion designer who is upset that their measurements for their fashion line were not reflective of their actual physiques. The designer used a cover of the band's previous album as a reference for his designs, and like the cover of Fighting the World, the band is standing shirtless on a pile of stones. The cover had been airbrushed to make the band members look much thinner and more physically fit than they actually were.

== Sources ==
- ATCO Records (1987). Fighting the World (Album sleeve notes). MANOWAR. New York City: Atlantic Recording Corporation. 90563-1.
- Popoff, Martin (November 1, 2005). The Collector's Guide to Heavy Metal: Volume 2: The Eighties. Burlington, Ontario, Canada: Collector's Guide Publishing. ISBN 978-1-894959-31-5.
