= Hail to England =

- Cover art by Ken Landgraf

Studio album by Manowar
- Released: February 1984
- Recorded: November 1983
- Studio: Phase One Studios, Toronto, Canada
- Genre: Power metal; heavy metal
- Length: 33:24
- Label: Music for Nations
- Producer: Jack Richardson

Manowar chronology
| Into Glory Ride (1983) | Hail to England (1984) | Sign of the Hammer (1984) |

Hail to England is the third studio album by American heavy metal band Manowar, released in February 1984 by Music for Nations. A tribute to their fanbase in the United Kingdom, the album was the first of Manowar's albums to chart, reaching No. 83 in the UK Albums Chart. The album received favorable reception among writers, critics, and music magazines and is considered one of the strongest albums from Manowar.

== Background ==
The title of the album is a tribute to the loyal fanbase of the United Kingdom and Europe that Manowar gained over the years. However, the album artwork actually features the flag of the United Kingdom, and not the flag of England. The album is also a tribute to the predominantly British NWOBHM that had emerged in the early 1980s.

The bassist Joey DeMaio wanted to work with producer Jon Mathias, again, who had engineered and produced Battle Hymns and Into Glory Ride respectively, but the band was told that Mathias was not interested. The band then enlisted Jack Richardson for the album Hail to England, and booked the sessions at Phase One Studios in Toronto, Canada. Manowar recorded many songs at the studio for two albums in mind, which would become Hail to England and Sign of the Hammer.

In writing the songs, guitarist Ross "The Boss" Friedman and DeMaio exchanged ideas and gradually develop them into songs, with DeMaio writing the lyrics, and then rehearsing it before entering the studio. Hail to England was reported to have been recorded in twelve days between 1983 and winter 1984. For the album, Friedman used a modified guitar tuning for songs like "Each Dawn I Die" and "Bridge of Death"; in the tuning, every strings are in standard tuning except for the sixth string which is tuned to C#. Friedman would later state that no producer managed to capture Manowar on tape until they met Richardson, recalling that he was able to "deal with our volume in the studio."

== Release and reception ==
Professional ratings
Review scores
| Source | Rating |
|---|---|
| AllMusic | 4/5 stars |
| Collector's Guide to Heavy Metal | 10/10 |
| Encyclopedia of Popular Music | 4/5 stars |
| Sputnikmusic | 4/5 stars |

Hail to England was released in February 1984 by Music for Nations. It peaked at No. 83 on the UK album charts.

In 2007, Adrien Begrand, writing for PopMatters considered Hail to England to be a "spotless record", highlighting the "matching staccato picking" of Ross "The Boss" Friedman and Joey DeMaio, and the "howling" singing of Eric Adams, further asserting that Manowar are "arguably as invigorating" as their British counterparts. Similarly, Eduardo Rivadavia, writing for AllMusic, states that the album is "Manowar's finest hour", arguing that with the musicianship of Friedman and DeMaio, the album is "executed with incredible technical skill" and "heartfelt conviction". Some writers and critics consider the bass solo of "Black Arrows" by Joey DeMaio to be one of the weakest parts of the album.

In 2017, Rolling Stone ranked Hail to England as 87th on their list of the 100 greatest metal albums, and Loudwire ranked it as the 17th-best power metal album. In 2019, Metal Hammer ranked it as the fourth-best power metal album, but later also included its cover on their list of "50 most hilariously ugly rock and metal album covers ever".

A remixed and remastered 'Imperial Edition' of the album was released in 2019, with the band stating that the revised version would add 'the depth, the power and the clarity that could not be present in the original mixes and masters'.

== Track listing ==
All tracks are written by Joey DeMaio, except where noted

| No. | Title | Writer(s) | Length |
|---|---|---|---|
| 1. | "Blood of My Enemies" | | 4:15 |
| 2. | "Each Dawn I Die" | Ross the Boss, DeMaio | 4:20 |
| 3. | "Kill with Power" | | 3:57 |
| 4. | "Hail to England" | | 4:24 |
| 5. | "Army of the Immortals" | Ross, DeMaio | 4:24 |
| 6. | "Black Arrows" (instrumental) | | 3:06 |
| 7. | "Bridge of Death" | | 8:58 |
| Total length: | | | 33:24 |

== Personnel ==
Manowar

- Eric Adams – vocals
- Ross the Boss – guitars, keyboards
- Joey DeMaio – bass, bass pedals
- Scott Columbus – drums, percussion

Additional musicians

- St. Mary's Cathedral Choir – choir, vocals on "Hail to England"
- David Corell – choirmaster on "Hail to England"

Production

- Jack Richardson – producer
- Robin Brouwers – engineer
- Joe Primeau, Armand John Petri – assistant engineers
- Joe Brescio – mastering
- Ken Landgraf – Illustrations
- Lucifer Burns, Armand "The Arm" Biondi, Anthony "Chio" Chiofalo – technicians
- Jay Bergen – management, representation
- J.A.R. Productions – A&R

== Charts ==
| Chart (1984) | Peak position |
|---|---|
| UK Albums (OCC) | 83 |

== Sources ==
- Begrand, Adrien (25 March 2007). "Fight or Flight: The Dichotomy of Manowar". PopMatters. PopMatters.
- Dome, Malcolm (29 June 2024). "How Manowar delivered death to false metal with Hail To England". Louder Sound. Metal Hammer.
- Larkin, Colin (2006). The Encyclopedia of Popular Music. Vol. 5 (4th ed.). London, England: Muze and Oxford University Press. ISBN 978-0-19-531373-4.
- Popoff, Martin (1 November 2005). The Collector's Guide to Heavy Metal: Volume 2: The Eighties. Burlington, Ontario, Canada: Collector's Guide Publishing. ISBN 978-1894959315.
