= Louder Than Hell (Manowar album) =

- Cover art by Ken Kelly

Studio album by Manowar
- Released: April 29, 1996
- Studio: Haus Wahnfried, New York, SoundCastle Studios, Los Angeles (orchestra)
- Genre: Heavy metal; power metal
- Length: 50:03
- Label: Geffen
- Producer: Manowar

Manowar chronology
The Hell of Steel: Best of Manowar (1994)	Louder Than Hell (1996)	Hell on Wheels (1997)

Professional ratings
Review scores
Source	Rating
AllMusic	3/5 stars
Collector's Guide to Heavy Metal	9/10

Louder Than Hell is the eighth album by heavy metal band Manowar, released on April 29, 1996. It is the first album to feature guitarist Karl Logan, as well as the return of drummer Scott Columbus. Cover art was done by Ken Kelly. The songs "Brothers of Metal", "Courage" and "Number One" were demoed and played live by the band already in 1986, 10 years before their official album release.

== Track listing ==
All songs written by Joey DeMaio, except where noted.

No.	Title	Writer(s)	Length
1.	"Return of the Warlord"	Karl Logan, DeMaio	5:19
2.	"Brothers of Metal Pt. 1"		3:54
3.	"The Gods Made Heavy Metal"	Logan, DeMaio	6:03
4.	"Courage"		3:49
5.	"Number 1"		5:11
6.	"Outlaw"	Logan, DeMaio	3:22
7.	"King"		6:25
8.	"Today Is a Good Day to Die" (Instrumental)		9:42
9.	"My Spirit Lives On" (Instrumental)	Logan	2:09
10.	"The Power"		4:09
Total length:			50:03

== Personnel ==
=== Manowar ===
- Eric Adams – vocals
- Karl Logan – guitars
- Joey DeMaio – bass, keyboards
- Scott Columbus – drums

=== Additional musicians ===
- David Campbell – orchestral arrangements, conductor

=== Production ===
- Rich Breen – engineer
- Ehab Haddad – assistant engineer
- George Marino – mastering
- John Pettigrass – recording supervisor

== Charts ==
Chart (1996)	Peak position
Austrian Albums (Ö3 Austria)	16
Finnish Albums (Suomen virallinen lista)	11
German Albums (Offizielle Top 100)	7
Japanese Albums (Oricon)	93
Swedish Albums (Sverigetopplistan)	22
Swiss Albums (Schweizer Hitparade)	24
