= Muze =

Business services company

Founded in 1991, Muze, Inc. was a business-to-business provider of media information, metadata, and digital preview samples that enable search, discovery, and purchase of digital entertainment content.

"Muze was founded Trev Huxley and Paul Zullo in 1986 under the name Digital Radio Network, which used to trade air time with rock music radio stations, giving the stations a segment that allowed listeners to call up and get information on album being released on CD in exchange for allowing Digital Radio to sell advertising time to sponsors."

Muze media information databases are used by businesses to support the sale of entertainment products – such as music tracks and albums, videos and DVDs, books, and video games – and to attract and retain subscribers to Internet, mobile, and social networking sites. Muze was based in New York City with operations in North America and the United Kingdom.

In April 2009, Macrovision (now TiVo) announced that it had signed a definitive agreement to acquire substantially all of the assets of Muze, Inc. in a $16.5 million cash transaction. The transaction closed on April 30.

Among Muze's clients were Amazon, Apple, eBay, Microsoft, Yahoo!, Real / Rhapsody, B&N, Borders, Tower, Best Buy, Virgin, Wal-Mart, ArkivMusic, Netflix and Rotten Tomatoes.
