= Kings of Metal =

- Cover art by Ken Kelly

Studio album by Manowar
- Released: November 18, 1988
- Recorded: Universal Recording, Chicago
- Genre: Heavy metal, power metal
- Length: 47:57
- Label: Atlantic
- Producer: Manowar, Jason Flom

Manowar chronology
Fighting the World (1987)	Kings of Metal (1988)	The Triumph of Steel (1992)

Professional ratings
Review scores
Source	Rating
AllMusic	2.5/5 stars
Collector's Guide to Heavy Metal	6/10

Kings of Metal is the sixth album by the American heavy metal band Manowar, released on November 18, 1988 by Atlantic Records. The album was the last to feature guitarist and founding member Ross "The Boss" Friedman, who later went on to rejoin punk band The Dictators. Drummer Scott Columbus left the band after this album as well, but rejoined for 1996's Louder Than Hell and remained with the band until 2008.

In 2017, Loudwire ranked it as the 13th-best power metal album of all time. The album was re-recorded by the band in 2014 as Kings of Metal MMXIV.

== Track listing ==
All songs written by Joey DeMaio except where noted.

American, European and Japanese track listing
No.	Title	Writer(s)	Length
1.	"Wheels of Fire"		4:10
2.	"Kings of Metal"	Ross Friedman, DeMaio	3:43
3.	"Heart of Steel"		5:10
4.	"Sting of the Bumblebee" (instrumental)	Nikolai Rimsky-Korsakov (adapted by DeMaio, lyrics transcribed by Bob Piorun)	2:49
5.	"The Crown and the Ring (Lament of the Kings)"		4:46
6.	"Kingdom Come"		3:56
7.	"Pleasure Slave" (included on most CD editions of the album (often as a bonus track), but omitted from the original single-LP vinyl release; later double-LP reissues include the track)		5:37
8.	"Hail and Kill"	Friedman, DeMaio	5:57
9.	"The Warriors Prayer"		4:20
10.	"Blood of the Kings"		7:29
Total length:			47:57

Asian edition track listing
No.	Title	Length
1.	"Wheels of Fire"	4:11
2.	"Kings of Metal"	3:43
3.	"Heart of Steel"	5:10
4.	"Sting of the Bumblebee" (instrumental)	2:45
5.	"The Crown and the Ring (Lament of the Kings)"	4:53
6.	"Kingdom Come"	3:55
7.	"Hail and Kill"	5:54
8.	"The Warriors Prayer"	4:20
9.	"Blood of the Kings"	7:30
Total length:		42:21

== Personnel ==
Manowar

- Eric Adams − vocals
- Ross the Boss − guitars
- Joey DeMaio − bass
- Scott Columbus − drums

Additional musicians

- Canoldir Male Choir directed by Clive Griffiths
- Arthur Whilshire – grandfather narrator on track 9
- Grant Williams – grandson on track 9

Production

- Richard Breen – engineer, mixing, Synclavier programming
- Elvis T. Gruber – assistant engineer
- Vince Gutman – digital programming, recording and mixing supervision
- Howie Weinberg – mastering at Masterdisk, New York
- Jason Flom – executive producer

== Charts ==
Chart (1988)	Peak position
Finnish Albums (The Official Finnish Charts)	20
German Albums (Offizielle Top 100)	37
Swedish Albums (Sverigetopplistan)	45

== Certifications ==
Region	Certification	Certified units/sales
Germany (BVMI)	Gold	250,000^{^}
Spain (Promusicae)	Gold	50,000^{^}
^{^} Shipments figures based on certification alone.
