= Manowar =

American heavy metal band

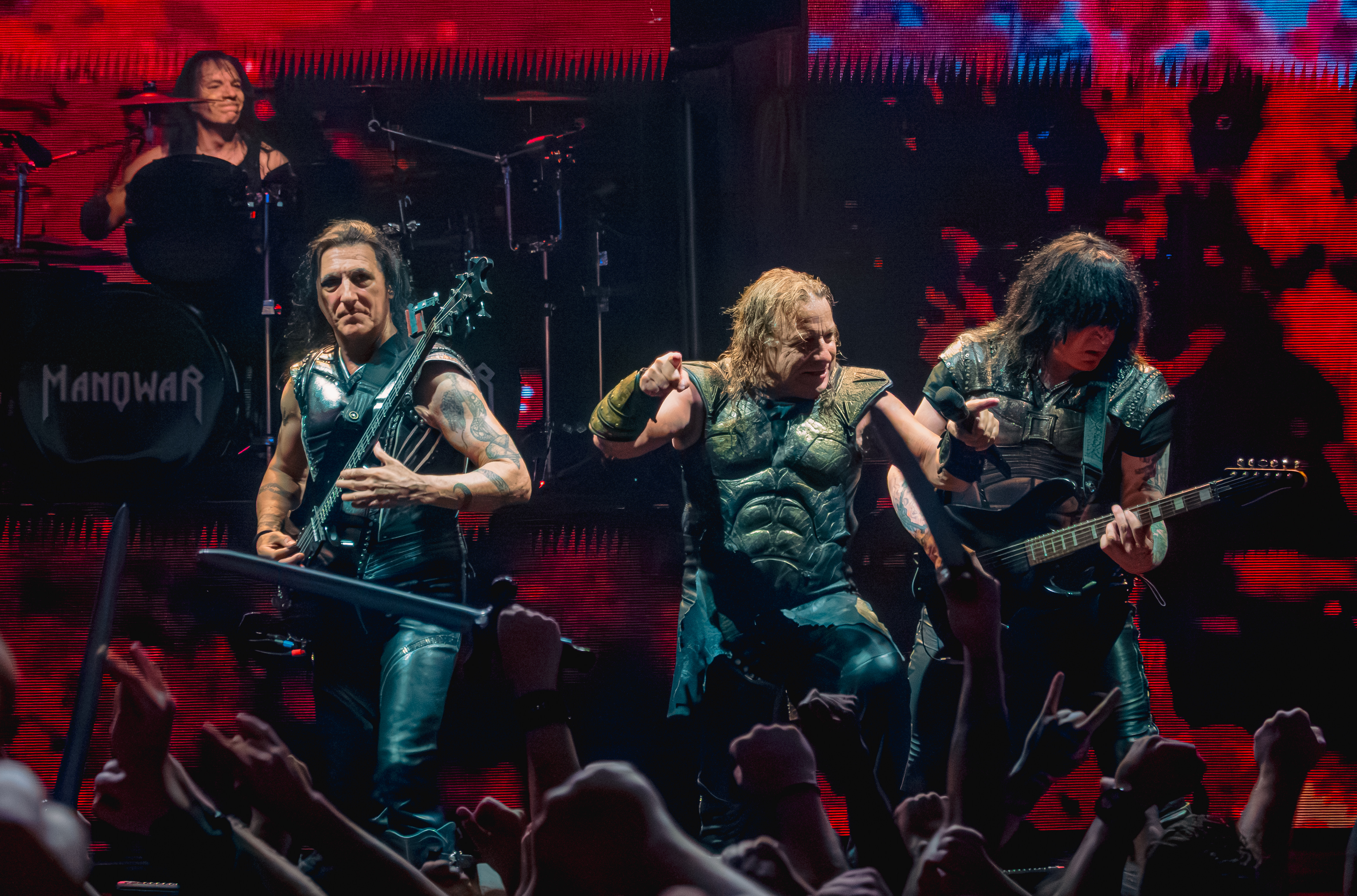
- Manowar performing in 2025

Background information
- Origin: Auburn, New York, U.S.
- Genres: Heavy metal; power metal
- Years active: 1980–present
- Labels: Magic Circle; Atco; Atlantic; Geffen
- Members: Joey DeMaio; Eric Adams; Dave Chedrick; Michael Angelo Batio
- Past members: Ross the Boss; Donnie Hamzik; Scott Columbus; David Shankle; Kenny Earl Edwards; Karl Logan; Anders Johansson; E. V. Martel
- Website: manowar.com

Manowar is an American heavy metal band from Auburn, New York. Formed in 1980, the group is known for lyrics based on fantasy fiction (particularly sword and sorcery) and mythology (particularly Norse and Greco-Roman mythology) as well as numerous songs celebrating the genre and its core audience. The band is also known for a loud and emphatic sound. In an interview for MTV in February 2007, bassist Joey DeMaio lamented that "these days, there's a real lack of big, epic metal that is drenched with crushing guitars and choirs and orchestras... so it's nice to be one of the few bands that's actually doing that". In 1984, Manowar was included in the Guinness Book of World Records for delivering the loudest performance, a record that they have since broken on two occasions. They also hold the world record for the longest heavy metal concert after playing for five hours and one minute in Bulgaria (at Kavarna Rock Fest) in 2008. They are known for their slogan "death to false metal".

== History ==
=== Origins (1980–1981) ===
Manowar's history began in 1980, when bassist Joey DeMaio met guitarist Ross "the Boss" Friedman while working as a bass tech and fireworks manager for Black Sabbath on the Heaven & Hell Tour. Ross the Boss, a former member of the punk rock band the Dictators, was the guitar player in one of Black Sabbath's support bands, Shakin' Street. The two bonded over their shared musical interests and decided to form a band upon the suggestion of Black Sabbath singer Ronnie James Dio. To complete the roster, they hired drummer Donnie Hamzik and singer Eric Adams, a former classmate and friend of DeMaio. Adams's real name is Louis Marullo; Ross the Boss proposed him to use a stage name instead, and he chose "Eric Adams" as an homage to his sons Eric and Adam. The name Manowar was suggested by the band's instrument designer, John "Dawk" Stillwell. The name is a shortened version of the phrase "man of war", and although it may be understood as a reference to the man-of-war naval ships, DeMaio simply chose it as a synonym of "warrior".

=== Battle Hymns (1981–1982) ===
Soon after its formation, Manowar recorded a demo, which proved enough to secure a contract with Liberty Records in 1981. Their debut album, Battle Hymns, was released the following year. As the song "Dark Avenger" required an introductory narration, the band wanted to include a famous actor in it. Executive producer Bob Currie contacted the manager of Orson Welles, who was open to the idea. He recorded two narrations, for the songs "Dark Avenger" and "Defender".

Following the album's release, Manowar embarked on their first tour. They played support for hard rocker Ted Nugent for a few months and then continued on their own. Following the tour, Hamzik left the band and was replaced by Scott Columbus.

=== Into Glory Ride and mainstream success (1983–1988) ===
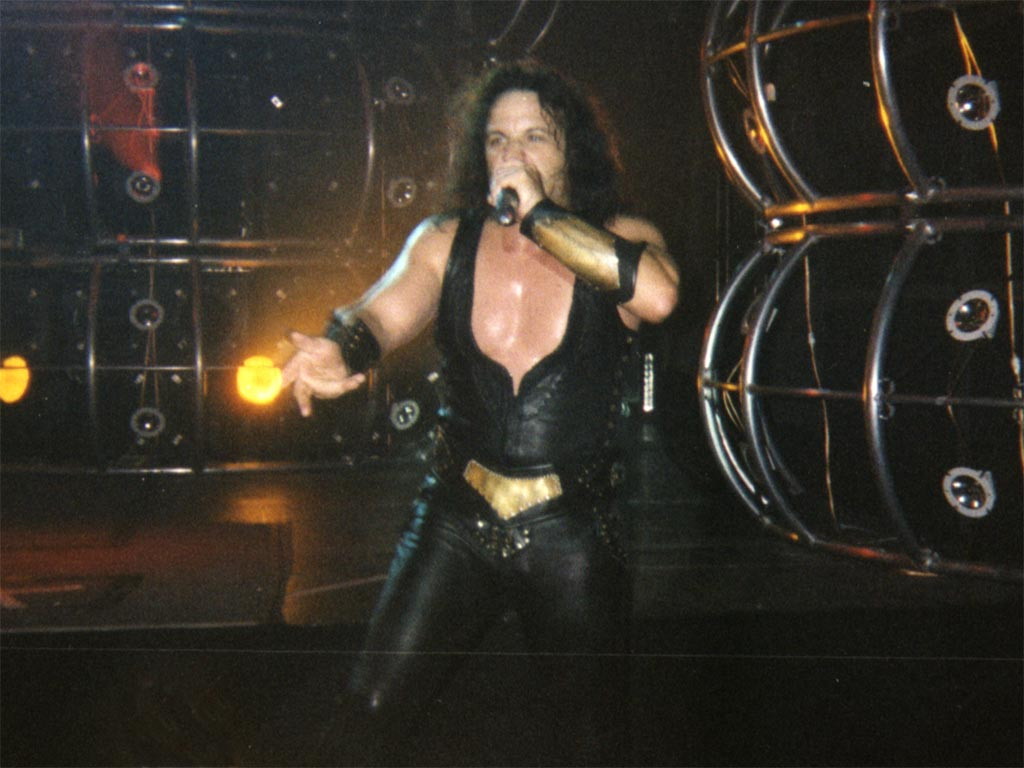
Frontman Eric Adams in 2002

By 1983, the band left Liberty Records and struck a deal with Megaforce in the US and Music for Nations in Europe—signing the contract in their own blood, to make a stance against the music industry they felt slighted by. The signing was a cover story in the 1983 July–August issue No. 47 of Kerrang!

Manowar subsequently went into the studio to produce what, in the intentions of the group, would have been a simple EP, but which instead turned into their second full-length album, Into Glory Ride, issued in 1983. An EP was actually published in 1983, with the title Defender, containing, as its main track, the eponymous song, which included more work by Welles. The track was later re-recorded and included on the 1987 album Fighting the World. In 1984, Manowar released Hail to England and followed it with Sign of the Hammer, only ten months later.

The band switched to Atlantic Records in 1987, subsequently issuing Fighting the World, which enjoyed more extensive distribution and increased their prominence in the international heavy metal scene. Album art was designed by Ken Kelly.

In 1988, Manowar released Kings of Metal, the band's best-known work. Songs like "Heart of Steel", "Kings of Metal", and "Hail and Kill" are performed regularly in concerts. The album is Manowar's highest-selling album worldwide.

The band then embarked on a world tour, for a period of approximately three years, with stops in almost all European nations. During that tour, DeMaio fired Ross the Boss. According to a 2008 interview with the guitarist, "Joey felt that Manowar would be better without me". He was replaced by David Shankle, who was chosen by members of the band after a search among approximately 150 candidates. Scott Columbus later also decided to leave the band, during the Kings of Metal tour. He picked his replacement, Kenny Earl Edwards, soon nicknamed "Rhino".

=== New albums, live releases (1992–2002) ===
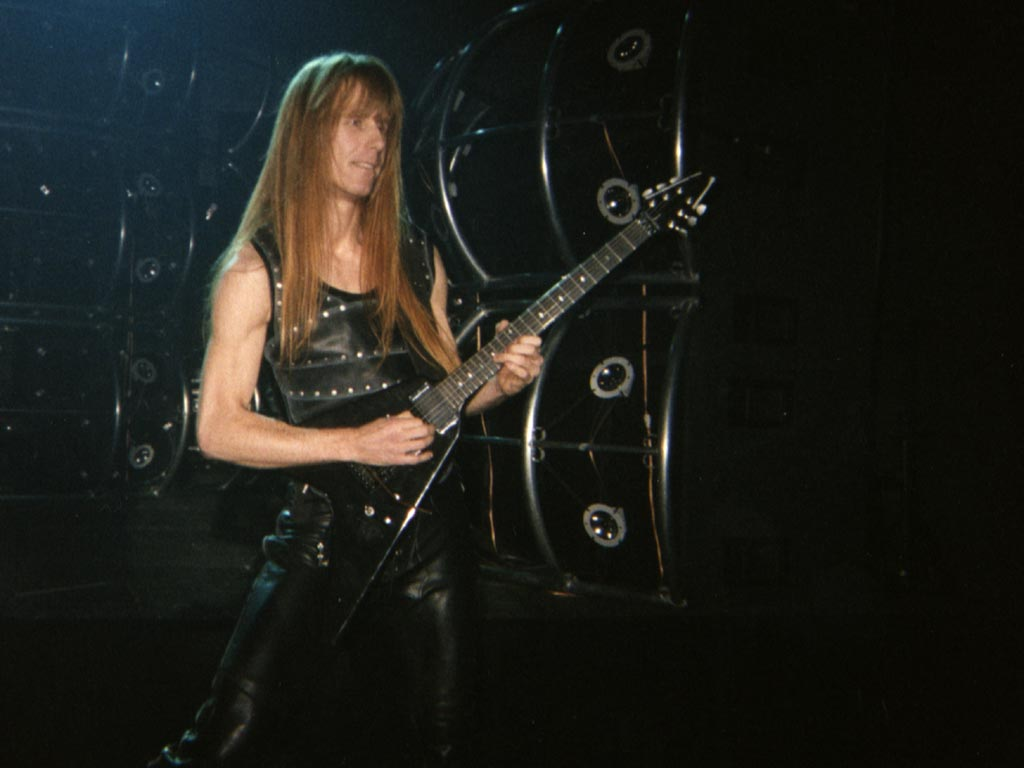
Karl Logan in 2002

Manowar released their seventh studio album, The Triumph of Steel, in 1992. It gained some success and was particularly famous for the presence of a suite lasting no less than 28 minutes, entitled "Achilles, Agony and Ecstasy in Eight Parts", inspired by the events of the Iliad and the hero Achilles. After this release, the band went on a world tour for two years. After the expiration of their contract with Atlantic, Manowar signed with Geffen Records. In 1994, Shankle unexpectedly left the band to form his own group. He was replaced by Karl Logan. The same year saw the unexpected return of Scott Columbus, who replaced Edwards.

In 1996, Manowar issued Louder Than Hell, their first new studio album in four years. The band went on to release the compilation Anthology, and their first live album, Hell on Wheels, through BMG. This was followed by a second live record, Hell on Stage.

=== Warriors of the World, Hell on Earth, and Magic Circle Music (2002–2005) ===
In 2002, six years after their last studio album, Manowar released Warriors of the World, which included a version of Puccini's aria "Nessun Dorma". The band then embarked on a world tour, titled Warriors of the World United Tour. They also issued several DVDs: Fire and Blood (2002), Hell on Earth Part III (2003), Hell on Earth Part IV (2005), all of which were directed by Neil Johnson.

In 2003, DeMaio founded his own record label, Magic Circle Music, which became the band's official home.

=== Gods of War and Thunder in the Sky (2006–2009) ===
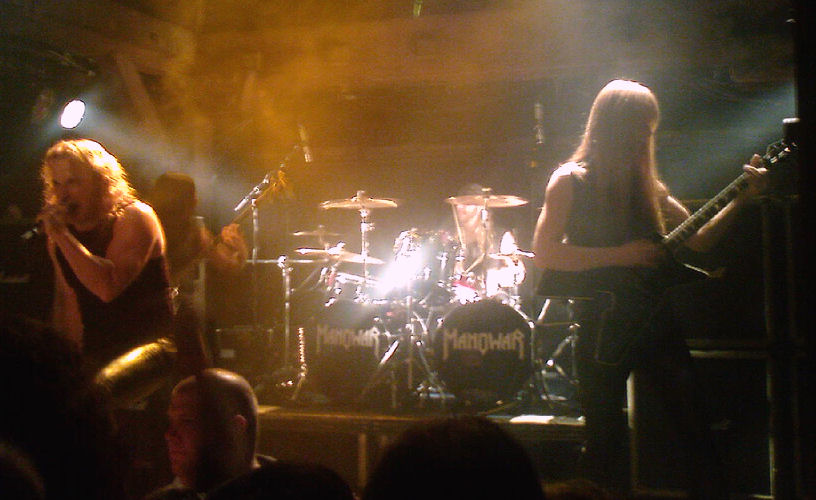
Manowar in Hamburg during their 2007 tour

In 2006, Manowar released the EP The Sons of Odin, with footage from the Earthshaker Fest 2005. They followed it a year later with the full-length Gods of War and the 2009 EP Thunder in the Sky, which includes the song "Father", sung in fifteen different languages.

=== Scott Columbus' death, Battle Hymns MMXI, and The Lord of Steel (2010–2013) ===
On June 1, 2010, Classic Rock magazine published an interview with drummer Scott Columbus, who said that he had not worked with the band since April 2008 and had in fact left. He also said that statements made in the past, regarding his break in 1990 and 2008 because of an illness and a personal tragedy, were largely untrue and were made without his approval. On October 15, 2010, Joey DeMaio announced on Facebook that Donnie Hamzik was officially a member of Manowar again after a 26-year absence. On April 4, 2011, Columbus died, at the age of 54. On April 5, 2020, Columbus' daughter Teresa publicly announced that her father's cause of death was suicide and urged for more awareness of mental illness and depression.

Manowar's subsequent release, in November 2010, was a re-recording of their 1982 debut album, Battle Hymns. Titled Battle Hymns MMXI, it included narration by Sir Christopher Lee. On July 21, 2011, the band embarked on a UK tour for the first time in 16 years and performed Battle Hymns in its entirety.

Manowar's next studio album, The Lord of Steel, was released in June 2012, exclusively on iTunes and on the band's own online store. The song "El Gringo" is featured in the soundtrack to the film of the same name.

After the Lord of Steel tour was over in 2013, Manowar released a live EP, titled The Lord of Steel Live, which included six tracks recorded during the tour.

=== Kings of Metal MMXIV (2013–2014) ===
On July 28, 2013, Manowar announced that they would be re-recording their 1988 album, Kings of Metal, with an expected release date of late 2013. Brian Blessed recorded a narration for the track "The Warrior's Prayer". Kings of Metal MMXIV came out in February 2014. The band subsequently embarked on a world tour.

=== Logan's arrest and continued touring (2015–present) ===
On May 22, 2015, Manowar announced that they were working on a new studio album that was set to be released in early 2016. No record came out, however, and instead, the band traveled to Europe in early 2016 for the Gods and Kings World Tour 2016, which included their first concerts in Slovakia, Latvia, and Belarus.

On May 25, 2016, the band announced that they would embark on their next world tour, dubbed the Final Battle. They recruited drummer Marcus Castellani from the Brazilian tribute band Kings of Steel for the tour.

On October 25, 2018, it was revealed that guitarist Karl Logan was arrested on August 9 in Charlotte, North Carolina, for allegedly possessing child pornography and was charged with six counts of third-degree exploitation of a minor, ultimately resulting in a conviction and a prison sentence. Manowar issued a statement shortly after, saying that Logan would not perform with them any longer. They then said that their upcoming album and tour would not be affected. Following Logan's arrest, former guitarist David Shankle expressed interest in rejoining the band.

On January 1, 2019, Manowar announced that guitarist E. V. Martel would join them on their tour. On March 22, the band stated that they would release a trilogy of EPs based upon the Final Battle world tour. The first one, The Final Battle I, came out on March 29 in an exclusive pre-sale at the merchandise booth in Frankfurt and also during European shows. It was then issued on iTunes worldwide. Former HammerFall and Yngwie Malmsteen drummer Anders Johansson was announced as the new live drummer shortly after and made his debut at the March 25 show in Brno, Czechia. Despite the tour's name, bassist Joey DeMaio dismissed any claims of Manowar's retirement, mainly due to fans' demands to have them continue to perform.

In June 2019, the band's appearance at Hellfest was canceled for undisclosed reasons. Manowar clarified that the festival had canceled the performance, not they. Swedish band Sabaton replaced Manowar in the lineup. DeMaio later said that the band filed a lawsuit against the Hellfest organizers.

In May 2020, Manowar announced that they would embark on a tour, beginning in April 2021 in Europe, to celebrate their 40th anniversary. This did not take place, however.

On June 4, 2022, the day of the first show of their Crushing the Enemies of Metal Anniversary Tour '22/'23, it was announced that drummer Anders Johansson could not perform with the band due to family commitments, and he was replaced by Dave Chedrick. On September 2, following a statement by guitarist E. V. Martel that he would not be available for touring the following year, the band announced Michael Angelo Batio as their touring guitarist.

On October 15, 2023, the band announced that in 2024, they would re-record their album Sign of the Hammer, to be released under the title Sign of the Hammer 2024, while also confirming that their new, long-awaited, still-untitled studio album would come out in 2025. However, as of December 2025, there had been no news of either release. In January 2025, Manowar embarked on the Blood of Our Enemies Tour 2025.

Founding guitarist Ross the Boss announced he was diagnosed with amyotrophic lateral sclerosis on February 9, 2026. He died of the disease a month later, on March 26, at the age of 72.

== Musical style ==
Manowar's sound is categorized as power metal. According to James Christopher Monger of AllMusic: "Emerging in 1980, the group's approach was designed to be the raw, Viking antithesis of classic rock, and their music followed suit, based on urgent melodic riffs and fantastical lyrics that focused on themes of war, honor, death, and the primal power of rock & roll." He also noted that the band's sound contains "classical touches".

== The Faceless Warrior ==
The Faceless Warrior, also known as the King of Metal, is the band's mascot. The character first appeared in 1988 on the cover of the album Kings of Metal and has since been on the cover artwork of almost every subsequent Manowar album as well as on merchandise and in almost every Manowar live show.

In a May 2002 interview with Metal-Rules.com, vocalist Eric Adams was asked, "Who is that guy in your album cover? Do you have any name for him?" He replied, "No because he is you, he is her, he is this person he is that person and so on. He has no face and that was in [sic] purpose because everyone needs a heroes [sic] in their life and our music is all about heroes and you know being the leader not the follower. It's picture [sic] of hero and you being that hero is that what it is all about. So there is no real name for it. It's a fantasy world man. Put your face there are you are [sic] the hero!"

== The Sign of the Hammer ==
"The Sign of the Hammer" is a cultural gesture developed in the early years of the band, after the release of their album of the same name, which serves as their signature: It is formed by raising the right fist above the head, while using the left hand to grab the back of the right wrist. The media company Heilbronner Stimme published an article describing the Sign of the Hammer as "the striking greeting. A gesture that unites. A gesture that fits the pathos of the self-proclaimed Kings of Metal. A gesture that has become the trademark of the group founded in 1980".

The first official appearance of the gesture was on the front cover of the band's fifth album, Fighting the World, where vocalist Eric Adams is shown making the gesture in a drawing of the band members. It then appeared in the official music video for "Blow Your Speakers", shown being made by the band members and crowd during a concert, as well as in the full cover art of the 1992 album, The Triumph of Steel.

== Legacy ==
Manowar have an important place in the history and evolution of heavy metal music, and they have been influential in such subgenres as power metal, symphonic metal, Viking metal, pagan metal, folk metal, doom metal, gothic metal, and death metal.

They have influenced heavy metal bands around the world, including Abbath, Amon Amarth, Angra, Arch Enemy, Atlantean Kodex, Avatar, Battle Beast, Beast in Black, Brainstorm, Brothers of Metal, Burning Point, Children of Bodom, Coronatus, Crystal Viper, Death, Destroy Destroy Destroy, Doomsword, Elvenking, Ensiferum, Exmortus, Falconer, Firewind, Grand Magus, HammerFall, Holy Dragons, Hysterica, Immortal, Imperial Age, Jack Starr's Burning Starr, Khemmis, Korpiklaani, Lost Horizon, Majesty, Moonspell, Orden Ogan, Pegazus, Rhapsody of Fire, Sabaton, Seven Kingdoms, Seven Witches, Sons of Apollo, Steel Attack, Stormwarrior, Sulphur Aeon, Symphony X, Therion, Trick or Treat, Trivium, Týr, Unleash the Archers, Van Canto, White Skull, Wintersun, and Wizard.

== Band members ==
Current

- Joey DeMaio – bass, keyboards (1980–present), guitars (2018–present)
- Eric Adams – vocals (1980–present)
- Dave Chedrick – drums (2022–present)
- Michael Angelo Batio – guitars (2022–present)

Past

- Ross "the Boss" Friedman – guitars, keyboards (1980–1989; died 2026)
- Donnie Hamzik – drums (1981–1983, 2009–2017)
- Scott Columbus – drums (1983–1991, 1994–2008; died 2011)
- David Shankle – guitars (1989–1994)
- Kenny Earl "Rhino" Edwards – drums (1991–1994, 2008–2009)
- Karl Logan – guitars, keyboards (1994–2018)
- Marcus Castellani – drums (2017–2019)
- E. V. Martel – guitars (2019–2022)
- Anders Johansson – drums (2019–2022)

Timeline

== Awards ==
Metal Hammer Golden Gods Awards

Year	Nominee / work	Award	Result
2012	Joey DeMaio	The Golden God	Won

== Discography ==
Demo albums

- Manowar (1981)

Studio albums

- Battle Hymns (1982)
- Into Glory Ride (1983)
- Hail to England (1984)
- Sign of the Hammer (1984)
- Fighting the World (1987)
- Kings of Metal (1988)
- The Triumph of Steel (1992)
- Louder Than Hell (1996)
- Warriors of the World (2002)
- Gods of War (2007)
- The Lord of Steel (2012)

== See also ==
- Loudest band in the world
- List of heavy metal bands
