= Joey DeMaio =

American bassist

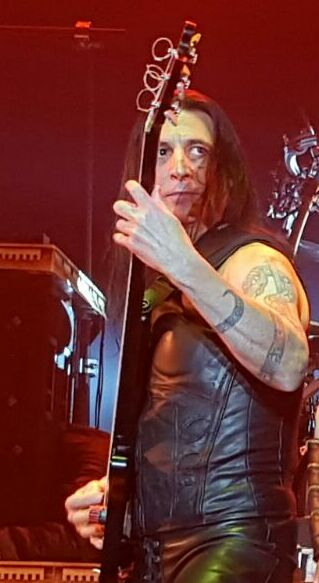
- DeMaio with Manowar in 2016

Background information
- Born: Joseph G. Maio; March 6, 1954 (age 72); Auburn, New York, U.S.
- Genres: Heavy metal, power metal
- Occupations: Musician, songwriter, producer
- Instruments: Bass, keyboards
- Years active: 1971–present
- Member of: Manowar

Joey DeMaio (born March 6, 1954) is an American musician who is the bass player and main songwriter for the heavy metal band Manowar which he founded in 1980. He is also the founder and owner of Magic Circle Music.

== Biography ==
He is a childhood friend of Manowar singer Eric Adams. DeMaio played bass in several school bands. In the 1970s, he toured with the musical Godspell (premiere in 1971 in New York City), taking musical lessons with the conductor. He worked as a pyro-tech for Black Sabbath during their "Heaven and Hell" tour.

In 2006, shortly after creating the record label Magic Circle Music, DeMaio became a manager of the Italian metal band Rhapsody of Fire. He is also a producer for the band HolyHell.

== Equipment ==
DeMaio mostly plays in piccolo tuning, which is the same as standard bass tuning, but tuned up an octave. He primarily uses custom Rickenbacker 4003 basses with EMG pickups and guitar-style string spacing, inspired off of a Rickenbacker he played that was modified by John "Dawk" Stillwell.

== See also ==
- Manowar discography
