= ...Ya Know? =

Studio album by Joey Ramone
- Released: May 22, 2012
- Recorded: 1999–2001, 2008–2011
- Studios: Joe Music Studio; Joey Ramone's studio apartment; KozyTone Ranch; Stratosphere Sound; Voodoo Island Studios; Coyote Studio
- Genres: Hard rock; punk rock; folk rock
- Length: 52:10
- Label: BMG
- Producers: Ed Stasium; Jean Beauvoir; Mickey Leigh; Joe Blaney; Daniel Rey

Joey Ramone chronology
Christmas Spirit... In My House (2002)	...Ya Know? (2012)

Singles from ...Ya Know?
- 1. "Rock 'n Roll Is the Answer" Released: April 21, 2012

Professional ratings
Aggregate scores
Source	Rating
Metacritic	61/100
Review scores
Source	Rating
AllMusic	3/5 stars
Alternative Press	3.5/5 stars
Classic Rock	8/10 stars
Consequence of Sound	D
The Guardian	2/5 stars
The Independent	(average)
MusicOMH	2.5/5 stars
Rolling Stone	4/5 stars
Sputnikmusic	1.5/5

...Ya Know? is the second and final solo album by Joey Ramone. It was released posthumously on May 22, 2012, by BMG. The album features producers Ed Stasium, Jean Beauvoir, Daniel Rey (all of whom worked with the Ramones), Joey's brother Mickey Leigh, and Joe Blaney. Musicians include Joan Jett, Steven Van Zandt, Richie Ramone, Holly Beth Vincent, Genya Ravan, members of Cheap Trick and the Dictators.

== Background ==
The songs from the album were originally recorded by Joey Ramone as demos with overdubs added later by his musician friends. The album was originally announced to contain 17 songs, but due to a last-minute glitch, two songs had to be cut. The songs in question were co-written by Joey and Dee Dee Ramone, but despite the intent of an equal financial split between the two, the manager of Dee Dee Ramone's business interests blocked the songs' inclusion on the album. Two of the album's songs, "Merry Christmas (I Don't Want to Fight Tonight)" and "Life's a Gas", are re-recordings of songs originally recorded by the Ramones.

The ten-year gap between Don't Worry About Me and ...Ya Know? was due to legal wranglings between Joey Ramone's estate and Daniel Rey, who had originally recorded the demos with Joey Ramone. The album's liner notes included the statement: "This is stated in fairness to the producers: Joey's vocal tracks were taken from demos owned by Joey, but held in possession of Rey prior to and following Joey's passing, thus forcing the Estate of Joey Ramone to re-acquire them from Rey for all further production and release. Co-production credit has been given Rey in fulfillment of contractual obligations."

Producer Ed Stasium, who worked on 11 of the album's 15 tracks, stated that he acquired the original demos in 2008. "Things were pretty basic," he said. "There was a drum machine, a guitar, a bass and Joey. The drum machine wasn't programmed or anything; it just made a beat. Some of the songs were fragmented, and some were arranged very well. That's what I had to work with ... I tried to add what I thought Joey was going for. I made solos where there weren't solos, intros where there weren't intros, endings where there weren't endings."

A 7" single of "Rock 'n Roll Is the Answer" was released on April 21, 2012, for Record Store Day. The song was premiered on Spinner.com on April 6, 2012.

== "New York City" music video ==
On September 25, 2012, Vevo premiered a music video for "New York City" online. The video, which was directed by Greg Jardin, features appearances by 115 people. People featured include:

- Mickey Leigh
- Richie Ramone
- Tommy Ramone
- Ed Stasium
- Andy Shernoff
- Reggie Watts
- Kristen Schaal
- Scott Adsit
- John Lutz
- Andrew W.K.
- Anthony Bourdain
- The Drums
- Matt & Kim
- Kurt Braunohler

== Deluxe edition ==
On November 23, 2012, a deluxe edition of the album was released as part of Record Store Day. It was limited to 500 copies. It featured a DVD that includes interviews with Elvis Costello, Kirk Hammett, Debbie Harry, Anthony Kiedis, Joe Strummer, and others, a 24-page booklet with pictures and lyrics; and a playable 5" vinyl "Merry Christmas (I Don't Want to Fight Tonight)" ornament.

== Track listing ==
All songs written by Joey Ramone (in a period between 1977 and 2000), except where noted.

No.	Title	Writer(s)	Length
1.	"Rock 'n Roll Is the Answer"	Ramone, Richie Stotts	4:39
2.	"Going Nowhere Fast"	Ramone, Daniel Rey	4:27
3.	"New York City"		3:31
4.	"Waiting for That Railroad"		4:45
5.	"I Couldn't Sleep"	Ramone, Mickey Leigh	2:35
6.	"What Did I Do to Deserve You?"		2:53
7.	"Seven Days of Gloom"		3:57
8.	"Eyes of Green"		2:26
9.	"Party Line"	Ramone, Rey	3:04
10.	"Merry Christmas (I Don't Want to Fight Tonight)"		4:20
11.	"21st Century Girl"		3:17
12.	"There's Got to Be More to Life"		3:11
13.	"Make Me Tremble"	Ramone, Andy Shernoff	3:16
14.	"Cabin Fever"		3:40
15.	"Life's a Gas"		2:02

== Personnel ==
- Joey Ramone – lead vocals on tracks 1–15, production on 13
- Greg Calbi – mastering on tracks 1–15
- Ed Stasium – production, engineering, mixing on tracks 2–4, 6–11, 14, 15, guitar, backing vocals on 2–4, 6–9, 11, 14, 15, bass on 2–4, 6–9, piano on 3, 7, 9, percussion on 4, 6, 8, 9, 11, 14, accordion on 4, mellotron on 14
- Mickey Leigh – guitar on tracks 1, 4–6, 8, 10, 11, bass on 1, 5, 10, 11, percussion on 1, 5, 10, 14, 15, backing vocals on 1, 3–6, 10, 11, 14, keyboards on 1, 10, 14, organ on 11, mixing on 1, 5, 11, production on 4, 5, 11
- Daniel Rey – production on tracks 2–4, 6–8, 10–12, 14, 15
- Andy Shernoff – bass on tracks 3, 8, 11, 13, 14, production, guitar, keyboards, percussion on 13
- Richie Ramone – drums on tracks 2, 6, 7, 11
- Holly Beth Vincent – backing vocals on tracks 3, 4, 7, lead vocals on 9
- Joe Blaney – production on track 1, engineering, mixing on tracks 1, 5, 11
- Kyle "Slick" Johnson – assistant engineering on tracks 1, 5, 11
- Al Maddy – backing vocals on tracks 3, 7, guitar on 14
- Bun E. Carlos – traps on tracks 4, 7, 8
- J.P. "Thunderbolt" Patterson – drums on tracks 3, 14
- Steven Van Zandt – backing vocals on tracks 3, guitar on 9
- Handsome Dick Manitoba – backing vocals on tracks 3, 7
- Richie Stotts – guitar on track 1
- Charley Drayton – drums on track 1
- Billy Hilfiger, Carla Lother – backing vocals on track 1
- Jonathan Townes – digital editing on track 1
- Ben Liscio – assistant mixing engineering on track 1
- Genya Ravan, Lenny Kaye – backing vocals on track 3
- Pat Carpenter – drums on track 5
- Amy Hartman – backing vocals on track 9
- Dennis Diken – drums on track 9
- Arno Hecht – saxophone on track 9
- Steve Jordan – drums on track 10
- Tommy Mandel – keyboards on track 10
- Joan Jett – guitar, backing vocals on track 11
- Kenny Laguna – keyboards on track 11
- Toshikazu Yoshioka – assistant mixing on track 11
- Jean Beauvoir – production, engineering, guitar, bass, drums, percussion, backing vocals on track 12
- Michael Caiati – engineering on track 13

Notes

- Tracks 1, 5 recorded at Joe Music Studio, New York City.
- Tracks 2–4, 6–12, 14, 15 recorded at the KozyTone Ranch, Durango, Colorado, and Stratosphere Sound, New York City.
- Track 11 recorded at Joey Ramone's studio apartment and Joe Music Studio.
- Track 12 recorded at Voodoo Island Studios.
- Track 13 recorded at Coyote Studio, New York City.

== Charts ==
Chart (2012)	Peak position
Belgian Albums (Ultratop Flanders)	107
German Albums (Offizielle Top 100)	91
UK Independent Albums (Official Charts)	23
US Billboard 200	180
US Independent Albums (Billboard)	31
US Indie Store Album Sales (Billboard)	15
