= Manitoba's Wild Kingdom =

American hard rock band

Background information
- Origin: New York City, U.S.
- Genres: Hard rock, punk rock, heavy metal
- Years active: 1986–1991, 2008
- Spinoff of: The Dictators
- Past members: Richard Manitoba; Andy Shernoff; Daniel Rey; Ross Friedman; J.P. Patterson; Scott Kempner
- Website: manitobaswildkingdom.com

Manitoba's Wild Kingdom were an American hard rock/punk rock band based in New York City. They were formed in 1986 and most recently performed in 2008. The band included members of the New York punk band The Dictators and was one of the few musical groups Sandy Pearlman ever signed to his short-lived record label, Popular Metaphysics.

== History ==
In late 1986, former members of The Dictators, vocalist Richard Manitoba, bassist and songwriter Andy Shernoff, and guitarist Daniel Rey (Rabinowitz), producer for The Ramones, organized to form the band Wild Kingdom. The Dictators had disbanded in late 1978. The three released a cover version of the song, "New York, New York" on the 1988 soundtrack to the film Mondo New York.

They signed with Sandy Pearlman (best known for his work with Blue Öyster Cult), who had also produced albums for The Dictators, on his Pearlman's new label, Popular Metaphysics, which was formerly the San Francisco punk label 415 Records. Soon after they began recording, Rey left the band and was replaced in 1989 by guitarist Ross "The Boss" Friedman, also formerly of The Dictators. The band began billing itself as Manitoba's Wild Kingdom in 1989 after Rey's departure, in shows around the New York City and New Jersey region. Drummer J.P. "Thunderbolt" Patterson, who would later become a member of The Dictators, and guitarist Ron Hanley also joined Manitoba's Wild Kingdom.

Pearlman released the band's debut album, ...And You?, in 1990 on Popular Metaphysics, co-branded with MCA. It is 25 minutes long, contains ten songs, and was released in Germany, the UK, and the US on CD, LP, and cassette. All the songs were written by bass player Andy Shernoff who also produced the album. The cover of the album was controversial in that it depicted an image from a Nazi recruiting poster from World War II. The Dictators had experienced similar provocation around their first album, Go Girl Crazy!, which contained the songs "Master Race Rock" and "Back to Africa". Perhaps ironic was that most bandmembers, of both bands, were and are Jewish. The album itself was well received. Rolling Stone called it "the first great punk rock album of the '90s", and AllMusic's Geoff Ginsberg called the album "amazing", and also said of it, "Twenty-five minutes of blazing, cleanly recorded punk/metal, the disc is close to perfect, if a bit short." They filmed a video for the song "The Party Starts Now!!", featuring the future Mrs. Kelsey Grammer, Camille Donatacci, that received regular airplay on MTV and rose to No. 8 on its Video Countdown in the summer of 1990. "The Party Starts Now!!" also appeared in a film of that year, Kindergarten Cop, near the beginning when Arnold Schwarzenegger's character walks into a club.

The band did a club tour that year and then in 1991, rhythm guitarist Scott Kempner, formerly of both The Dictators original lineup and the Del Lords, joined the band, whereupon they became The Dictators again. They reunited for their most recent performance having been at the 2008 Joey Ramone Birthday Bash, with a lineup that featured Manitoba, Shernoff, Friedman, and Patterson.

Their album ...And You? was re-released in 2009 on LP and CD on American Beat Records in the US. The Dictators still play songs from Manitoba's Wild Kingdom's album, and frequently open their shows with either "New York, New York" or "The Party Starts Now!!" Daniel Rey currently plays with The Martinets.

== Former members ==
- Handsome Dick Manitoba – lead vocals (1986–1991, 2008)
- Andy Shernoff – bass, backing vocals (1986–1991, 2008)
- Ross "the Boss" Friedman – guitars (1989–1991, 2008)
- J.P. "Thunderbolt" Patterson – drums, backing vocals (1989–1991, 2008)
- Daniel Rey – guitars (1986–1989)
- Scott Kempner – guitars (1991)
- Ron Hanley – guitars (1989)

== Discography ==
All tracks are written by Andy Shernoff.

...And You? (MCA Records, 1990)
No.	Title	Length
1.	"The Party Starts Now!!"	2:09
2.	"Haircut and Attitude"	3:10
3.	"New York, New York"	3:04
4.	"D.W.I."	2:30
5.	"I Want You, Tonight!"	2:38
6.	"Fired Up"	2:50
7.	"The Perfect High"	2:40
8.	"Had It Coming"	2:17
9.	"Prototype"	2:52
10.	"Speedball"	2:12
Total length:		26:28
