= Christmas Spirit... In My House =

EP by Joey Ramone
- Released: December 10, 2002
- Genre: Christmas music; punk
- Length: 16:13
- Label: Sanctuary
- Producer: Daniel Rey

Joey Ramone chronology
Don't Worry About Me (2002)	Christmas Spirit... In My House (2002)	...Ya Know? (2012)

Christmas Spirit... In My House is a posthumous Christmas music EP by Joey Ramone of the Ramones. It was released by Sanctuary Records on December 10, 2002, and features covers of Louis Armstrong's "What a Wonderful World" and Phil Spector's "Christmas (Baby Please Come Home)".

Originally available via CD, Sanctuary released a limited edition 10" vinyl of Christmas Spirit... In My House for Record Store Day on Black Friday 2014. The Winnipeg Sun rated the EP two out of three stars.

== Track listing ==
Christmas Spirit... In My House track listing
No.	Title	Length
1.	"Christmas (Baby Please Come Home)"	3:26
2.	"Merry Christmas (I Don't Want to Fight Tonight)"	4:26
3.	"Spirit in My House"	2:02
4.	"Don't Worry About Me"	3:55
5.	"What a Wonderful World"	2:23
Total length:		16:13

== Personnel ==
- Joey Ramone – vocals
- Daniel Rey – producer, engineering, mixing, guitars
- Andy Shernoff – bass
- Joe McGinty – keyboards
- Mickey Leigh – executive producer
- Charlotte Lesher – executive producer
- John Marshall Smith – engineering, mixing
- Howie Weinberg – mastering
- Sean Mallinson – design
- Dave Frey – management
- Ira Herzog – business management
- Wes Kidd – management
- Silent Partner Management – management
