= The Cyclones =

American new wave rock band

The Cyclones were a rock and roll band that helped pioneer the new wave music scene that erupted in the New York City area during the late 70s, early 80s. A female fronted trio, they began as a rockabilly cover band, became an original group in 78/79 which lasted until 1984. Original members included Dan Reich on drums (who remained throughout the band's tenure) and Walter Sczesny on bass. The group came into its own with addition of singer/guitarist/songwriter Donna Esposito. After a few transitions on bass guitar (including Mitch Easter of Let's Active), the band's stable lineup was complete in late 79/ early 1980 with the addition of Marc Seligman.

The Cyclones had a local hit, "You're So Cool" on Little Ricky Records (where they were label-mates of the Smithereens), released in 1981. The 45 marked the production debut of famed Dictator and punk pioneer Andy Shernoff. The record was played extensively on college (such as WNYU) and independent stations (such as WFMU where it is still played to this day) with a few commercial stations (such as WNEW-FM and WLIR) taking some spins as well. Critical darlings, they were the subject of numerous reviews and mention in articles in New York Rocker. They were also known to perform regularly at Maxwell's in Hoboken, NJ, CBGBs in NYC and spot appearances at Danceteria, The Peppermint Lounge and The Ritz. The song You're So Cool was a mainstay in the jukeboxes of CBGBs and Maxwell's for many years. The band also toured the Southeastern US in 1982 where they became acquainted with the then up and coming group R.E.M. during their appearance at the famed 40 Watt Club in Athens, Georgia Comrades of their scene included The Fleshtones, The dBs, The Bongos, and the Individuals. Fans included well respected rock critic Jim DeRogatis as well as Ira Kaplan and Georgia Hubley who were brewing Yo La Tengo up at the time.

In 1983 the Cyclones released a 4 song EP entitled "Out in the Cold" on Plexus Records (Ivan Julian and The Individuals). Produced by Mark Abel, the band felt the material strong however it was less well received than their initial release. Dan Reich and Marc Seligman, while the band was on hiatus performed and recorded with other local acts such as "The Mad Violets" (featuring Wendy Wild of Pulsallama) plus the John Glenn Band. They later reunited as rhythm section for the in 1986 with Hoboken favorites, and Cyclone influenced "The Vines" (not to be confused with the Australian band of the same name).

The band disbanded in 1984 after which Donna Esposito continued on with musical partner Frank Bednash in Cowboy and Spingirl/Toothpaste 2000 now, Mas Rapido. They have released a dozen albums for Parasol Records. Dan has played, recorded and performed in numerous bands including the Corvairs and Tex Wagner. Marc performs locally with Garage rock band The Von Ghouls and local Alternative rock band The Michael Collins Band. He also currently works in developing the music of his son Evan Seligman (star of MTV2s Wondershowzen) with their band "Fools on Sunday". They record annually at Mitch Easter's Fidelitorium in North Carolina.

== Personnel ==
Guitar - Donna Esposito

Bass - Marc Seligman

Drums - Dan Reich

=== Other members ===
Bass - Walter Szcesny (see Fleshtones)

Bass - Mitch Easter

Sax - (on RSVP)Action Combo of Gordon Spaeth and Brian Spaeth (see Fleshtones)

== Discography ==
7' 45 - You're So Cool b/w RSVP 1981 Little Ricky Records

EP - Out in the Cold - 1983 Plexus Records

Homework 8 - Various Artist Compilation - Year Unknown - Included You're So Cool.
