= Sniper (American band) =

Early punk band

- Origin: Forest Hills, Queens, New York, United States
- Genres: Glam punk
- Years active: 1972–1979
- Past members: Jeff Starship; Bob Butani; Danny Wray; Peter (Morgan) Morales; Patrick Franklyn; Alan Turner; Frank Infante; Vinny (Bank) Sanchez; Michael Harrington

Sniper was an early American glam punk band that formed in New York City in 1972. They were one of several bands that played at the Mercer Arts Center, Max's Kansas City and the Coventry alongside the New York Dolls and Suicide, and were most famous for its former members, which included frontman Joey Ramone (Jeff Hyman), prior to his forming the Ramones, and guitarist Frank Infante, later of Blondie.

== History ==
Sniper formed in 1972, with the original lineup consisting of Joey Ramone, guitarists Bob Butani and Danny Wray, bassist Peter (Morgan) Morales, and drummer Patrick Franklyn. Ramone played with Sniper under the name "Jeff Starship". He later recalled, "I used to wear this custom-made black jumpsuit, these like pink, knee-high platform boots- all kinds of rhinestones- lots of dangling belts and gloves". Ramone's brother, Mickey Leigh, later said, "I was shocked when the band came out. Joey was the lead singer and I couldn't believe how good he was. Because he'd been sitting in my house with my acoustic guitar, writing these songs like 'I Don't Care', fucking up my guitar, and suddenly he's this guy on stage who you can't take your eyes off of". Ramone continued playing with them until early 1974, when he was replaced by Alan Turner, formerly of 1960s Bronx rock band the Age of Reason.

Sniper played regularly at Max's, Club 82 and CBGB as the punk scene developed. In 1975, they recorded their only demo, Hots, at Record Plant Studios.

In 1975, Butani left Sniper to join Tuff Darts and was replaced by Infante. Later that year, Sniper changed their name to Kid Blast and added Vinny (Bank) Sanchez on keyboards. In 1977, Turner was replaced by Michael Harrington, and Infante left to join Blondie. They continued playing until 1978, when they changed the name of the band to Grand Slam. Grand Slam continued to play dates in New York City and the East Coast, eventually recording "Stitch in Time" at the Record Plant for the Max's Kansas City Volume 2 compilation album. They finally disbanded in 1979.

Wray became a studio session guitarist, later joining the DCvers, Sanchez stayed in New York and joined Mrozinski Music, while Morales and Franklyn formed the band Hunter in London with vocalist Bob Chabala. Turner reformed the Age of Reason in 2015, while Wray continues to perform with Wrayband.

In 2022, discovered footage of Sniper with frontman Jeff Hyman appeared on YouTube.
