= The Rattlers =

- Origin: New York City, United States
- Genres: Garage rock, pop punk
- Years active: 1979–1988
- Label: PVC Records
- Past members: Mickey Leigh; David Baillie; Dave U. Hall; Matty Quick

The Rattlers were an American rock band formed in the New York City in 1979. It was formed by guitarist/vocalist Mickey Leigh, who is the brother of Joey Ramone.

The group released two singles on small independent labels and one album on PVC Records. Their 1979 debut single "On the Beach" featured Joey Ramone on vocals. The album Rattled! has been widely ignored, although it got good reception. American music journalist Robert Christgau named it as one of his "Top 50 albums of 1985."

== Band members ==
- Mickey Leigh – vocals, guitar, keyboards
- David Baillie – vocals, keyboards
- David Merrill – bass guitar
- Dave U. Hall – bass guitar
- Matty Quick – drums
- Neil Benezra – drums

== Discography ==
=== Albums ===
- Rattled! (1985, re-released on CD in 1997)

=== Singles ===
- "On the Beach" / "Livin’ Alone" (1979)
- "What Keeps Your Heart Beatin’?" / "Let's Move" (1983)
