= Rattled! =

Studio album by The Rattlers
- Released: 1985
- Genres: Punk rock, power pop
- Length: 31:09
- Label: PVC Records
- Producer: Tommy Ramone

Professional ratings
Review scores
Source	Rating
Allmusic	link

Rattled! is the only studio album by New York City punk rock band The Rattlers, released by PVC Records in 1985. The 1997 CD release includes two singles from 1979 and 1983.

== Track listing ==
Side one
No.	Title	Writer(s)	Length
1.	"I Won't Be Your Victim"	Billy Baillie, Mickey Leigh, Dave U. Hall	2:47
2.	"Johnny's Entertainment"	Mickey Leigh	3:00
3.	"Pure and Simple"	Mickey Leigh	3:14
4.	"The Little Black Egg"	Charlie Conlon	2:52
5.	"I'm in Love With My Walls"	Mickey Leigh	2:33

Side two
No.	Title	Writer(s)	Length
1.	"Rattled"	Mickey Leigh	3:01
2.	"On the Beach"	Mickey Leigh	3:07
3.	"(If Paradise Is) Half as Nice"	Lucio Battisti, Jack Fishman	3:39
4.	"Bottom of the Barrel"	Mickey Leigh	3:34
5.	"From the Jungle to the Zoo"	Mickey Leigh	3:22

CD bonus tracks
No.	Title	Writer(s)	Length
1.	"What Keeps Your Heart Beatin'?"	Mickey Leigh	2:56
2.	"Let's Move"	Mickey Leigh	2:34
3.	"Livin' Alone"	Mickey Leigh	2:44

== Personnel ==
- Mickey Leigh – guitars, lead vocals, keyboards
- Billy Baillie – keyboards, backing vocals
- Dave U. Hall – bass, backing vocals
- Matty Quick – drums, backing vocals
- Michael Harnett – xylophone
- Joey Ramone – vocals (track 7)
