= Minnesota Strip =

Former neighborhood in Manhattan, New York

Coordinates: 40.7617°N 73.9866°W

The Minnesota Strip is an archaic name for an area in Manhattan comprising Eighth Avenue between 42nd Street and 57th Street. It is now part of Hell's Kitchen.

== History ==
The name comes from the high volume of teenage Midwestern prostitutes that populated the area from the 1960s to the 1990s and the term only began to disappear as public prostitution became the target of New York City's massive crackdown on prostitution and street crime under then-mayor Rudolph Giuliani.

== Popular culture ==
The phrase was used in the title of the 1980 film, Off the Minnesota Strip, starring Hal Holbrook and featuring Mare Winningham as a teenage runaway who returns to her home in Minnesota after months of working as a prostitute in New York. The made-for-TV film won the 1980 Emmy for 'Outstanding Writing in a Limited Series or Special' for writer David Chase.

The Minnesota Strip is referenced in the 1978 Broadway Musical Runaways.

The Dictators' song "Minnesota Strip" from their 1978 album Bloodbrothers is about the area.
