= New Metal Leader =

Studio album by Ross the Boss
- Released: August 22, 2008
- Studio: Steelpride Studios
- Genre: Heavy metal
- Length: 48:14; 51:00 (w/ bonus tracks)
- Label: AFM (Europe), Candlelight (USA)
- Producer: Ronny Lang, Ross the Boss

Ross the Boss chronology
New Metal Leader (2008)	Hailstorm (2010)

Professional ratings
Review scores
Source	Rating
AllMusic	3.5/5 stars

New Metal Leader is the debut album recorded by guitarist Ross "the Boss" Friedman and his German band under the name "Ross the Boss". It was released on August 22, 2008, on Candlelight records in the US and A.F.M. Records in Europe.

== Background ==
While the band is called, "Ross the Boss", Friedman has stated that "It is a real band with each member having his share of the whole." When asked about the meaning of the title "New Metal Leader", Friedman said "There are several reasons why I chose the title. People do consider me a leader in metal. It is a metal record. And I may not be new, but my band certainly is. The last thing I did [in the same musical vein as "New Metal Leader"] was [the Manowar album] Kings of Metal. The title of this new record had to be in the same realm; it had to have the same sick sense of humor."

== Track listing ==
No.	Title	Length
1.	"I.L.H"	0:49
2.	"Blood of Knives"	3:22
3.	"I Got The Right"	5:43
4.	"Death and Glory"	3:54
5.	"Plaque of Lies" (Brain Surgeons cover)	4:30
6.	"God of Dying"	5:27
7.	"May the Gods Be with You"	4:10
8.	"Constantine's Sword" (Brain Surgeons cover)	4:41
9.	"We Will Kill"	4:34
10.	"Matador"	4:48
11.	"Immortal Son"	6:16
Total length:		48:14

Limited Edition Digipak bonus tracks
No.	Title	Length
12.	"Falling One by One"	2:42
Total length:		51:00

== Notes ==
- The tracks, "Plague of Lies" and "Constantine's Sword" were co-written by Ross for the Brain Surgeons, with Albert Bouchard (former Blue Öyster Cult drummer), and Deborah Frost., and originally appear on the Brain Surgeons 2006 album, "Denial of Death".

== Personnel ==
Band

- Ross the Boss - guitar, keyboards
- Patrick Fuchs - vocals, guitars
- Carsten Kettering - bass
- Matthias "Matze" Mayer - drums

Session Members

- Tarek Maghary - keyboards on "I Got the Right" and "We Will Kill"
- Christof Steiner - keyboards on "I.L.H.", "God of Dying" and "Immortal Son"

Miscellaneous staff

- John Rup - recording (additional)
- Ronny Lang - arrangements (choir), producer
- Tarek "MS" Maghary - recording (tracks 1–11)
- Achim Köhler - mixing, mastering
- Dimitar Nikolov - cover art
- Oliver Szczypula - recording (track 12)
- Ross the Boss - producer
