= Bloodbrothers (album) =

Studio album by the Dictators
- Released: 1978
- Studios: Record Plant, New York
- Genres: Punk rock; hard rock
- Length: 34:53
- Label: Asylum
- Producers: Murray Krugman; Sandy Pearlman

The Dictators chronology
Manifest Destiny (1977)	Bloodbrothers (1978)	Fuck 'Em If They Can't Take a Joke (1981)

Bloodbrothers is the third album by the Dictators, and their second after switching to the Asylum label. "Faster and Louder" features an uncredited guest appearance from Bruce Springsteen.

== Critical reception ==
Professional ratings
Review scores
Source	Rating
AllMusic	4/5 stars
Collector's Guide to Heavy Metal	10/10
The Rolling Stone Album Guide	2.5/5 stars
The Village Voice	B−

The Globe and Mail wrote: "Almost oblivious to the strides their punk brethren have been making toward larger audiences and heavier influence, they continue to play things loudly and strongly while handsome Dick Manitoba struts."

AllMusic, which was critical of the band's previous album, released a favorable review of Bloodbrothers, stating that it "stands as a good example of what the band sounded like on a good night," as well as calling it "the Dictators' most rockingest and most musical album."

== Track listing ==
All tracks are written by Andy Shernoff except where indicated.

Side one
No.	Title	Writer(s)	Length
1.	"Faster and Louder"	Shernoff, Joey Schaedler	2:48
2.	"Baby, Let's Twist"		3:52
3.	"No Tomorrow"		3:17
4.	"The Minnesota Strip"		4:06
5.	"Stay with Me"		4:10

Side two
No.	Title	Writer(s)	Length
1.	"I Stand Tall"		5:04
2.	"Borneo Jimmy"		4:04
3.	"What It Is"	Scott Kempner, Shernoff	3:00
4.	"Slow Death" (Flamin' Groovies cover)	Cyril Jordan, Roy Loney	4:19

== Personnel ==
The Dictators

- Handsome Dick Manitoba – lead vocals
- Ross "The Boss" Friedman – lead guitar, 12-string guitar
- Scott "Top Ten" Kempner – rhythm guitar
- Andy Shernoff – bass guitar, keyboards, lead and backing vocals
- Richie Teeter – drums, backing vocals

Production

- Murray Krugman, Sandy Pearlman – producers
- Shelly Yakus, Jay Krugman – engineers
- Johnny Lee, The Dictators – art direction
- Chris Callis – front cover photography
