= Manifest Destiny (The Dictators album) =

Studio album by the Dictators
- Released: 1977
- Studio: Record Plant, New York
- Genre: Punk rock
- Length: 37:50
- Label: Asylum
- Producer: Murray Krugman, Sandy Pearlman

The Dictators chronology
Go Girl Crazy! (1975)	Manifest Destiny (1977)	Bloodbrothers (1978)

Manifest Destiny is the second album by the Dictators and their first after switching to the Asylum label.

== Critical reception ==
Professional ratings
Review scores
Source	Rating
AllMusic	3/5 stars
Christgau's Record Guide	B
Collector's Guide to Heavy Metal	10/10
(The New) Rolling Stone Album Guide	3/5 stars

The New York Times noted that Handsome Dick Manitoba "certainly has flair, but he lacks a very distinct singing voice or style." Trouser Press praised the album as "another helping of brilliant Shernoff originals." Martin Popoff ranked the album 12th on his "Top 20 albums of Punk’s first year, 1977", in Goldmine.

== Track listing ==
All tracks are written by Andy Shernoff except where indicated.

Side one
No.	Title	Writer(s)	Length
1.	"Exposed"		4:27
2.	"Heartache"		3:37
3.	"Sleepin' with the TV On"		4:16
4.	"Disease"	Richard Blum, Andy Shernoff	6:26

Side two
No.	Title	Writer(s)	Length
1.	"Hey Boys"	Scott Kempner, Shernoff	3:02
2.	"Steppin' Out"		5:47
3.	"Science Has Gone Too Far"		3:27
4.	"Young, Fast, Scientific"		3:22
5.	"Search & Destroy" (The Stooges cover)	James Williamson, J.J. Osterberg	3:26

== Personnel ==
The Dictators

- Handsome Dick Manitoba – lead vocals
- Ross "The Boss" Friedman – lead guitar, 12-string guitar
- Scott "Top Ten" Kempner – rhythm guitar
- Andy Shernoff – keyboards, lead and backing vocals
- Mark "The Animal" Mendoza – bass guitar
- Richie Teeter – drums, backing vocals, lead vocals on "Sleeping with the TV On" and "Hey Boys"

Additional musicians

- Petronius Wood – additional keyboards

Production

- Murray Krugman, Sandy Pearlman – producers
- John Jansen – engineer
- Andy Abrams, Corky Stasiak, Gray Russell, Jay Krugman, Rod O'Brien, Thom Panunzio – assistant engineers
- Steve L. Schenck – production coordinator
- Anne Garner, Roni Hoffman, Veronica Drew Ink – art direction, design
- Eric Meola – photography
