= Donna Esposito =

American singer-songwriter-guitarist

Donna Esposito is an American singer-songwriter-guitarist born in Greenpoint, Brooklyn. The majority of her music is considered to be of the Power Pop genre. She has recorded 11 albums for the Parasol label with musical partner Frank Bednash under the various band names of Cowboy & Spingirl, Toothpaste 2000, and most recently Mas Rapido. Donna and Frank split songwriting/singing duties 50/50 on their various releases.

Donna began her musical career in the NY based band The Cyclones in 1978. She is currently active writing and recording with Frank Bednash, living in the Portland, Oregon area.

== Discography ==
(all on Parasol Records unless otherwise specified)

== The Cyclones ==
7-inch 45 rpm – You're So Cool b/w RSVP – Little Ricky Records 1981

EP – Out in the Cold – Plexus Records 1983

== Cowboy and Spingirl ==
Earcandy – 1993

Odd and Bobs CD – 1999

== Toothpaste 2000 ==
Fine, Cool, With Love, Best – May 1999

Death of an Italian Filmstar – Sept 1999

Bachelorette – Sept 1999

Va Va Voom – January 2000

Instant Action – March 2002

Catch 22 – August 2003

== Mas Rapido ==
Mas Rapido – January 2005

Pity Party – February 2007

Dumb is King – June 2010
