= Andy Shernoff =

American musician and producer (born 1952)

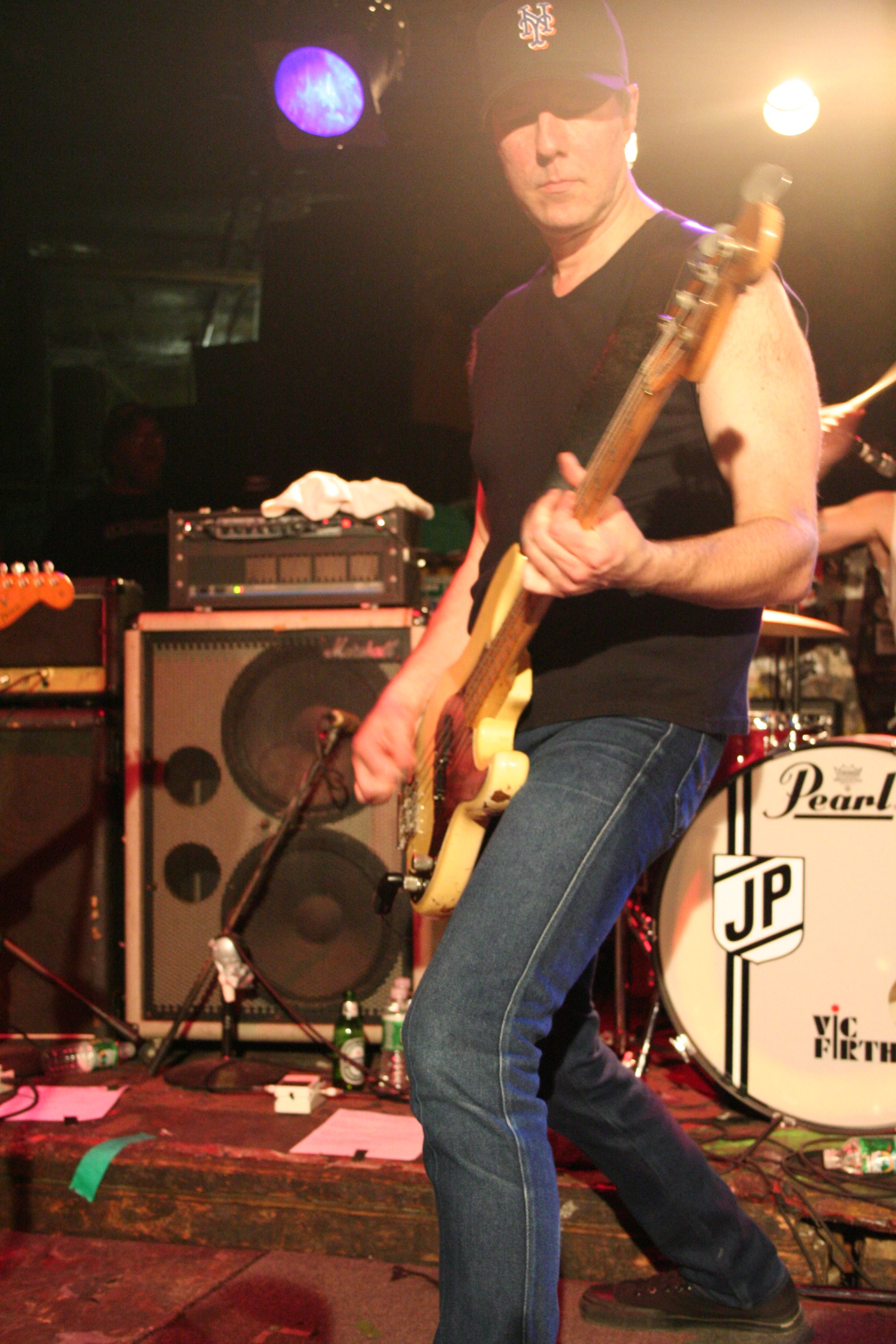

Background information
- Also known as: Adny Shernoff; The Christopher Columbus of Punk; The Punk Sommelier
- Born: April 19, 1952 (age 74); Queens, New York, U.S.
- Genres: Rock and roll, garage rock, punk rock, protopunk, hard rock
- Occupations: Musician, songwriter, record producer
- Instruments: Bass guitar, keyboards, vocals
- Years active: 1973–present
- Member of: The Dictators
- Website: andyshernoff.com

Andy Shernoff (born April 19, 1952) is an American musician, songwriter and record producer. He is a founding member of The Dictators, one of the original New York punk bands, in which he wrote nearly all of the songs, played bass guitar and keyboards, and sang backing vocals and occasional leads. He has been involved with a variety of other musical projects, most notably the heavily Dictators-populated Manitoba's Wild Kingdom and Joey Ramone's first studio album, Don't Worry About Me. He additionally co-wrote four Ramones songs with Joey.

Shernoff's current projects include garage rock band The Masterplan, featuring members of The Fleshtones and the Waxing Poetics. In the fall of 2009, he embarked upon a series of solo shows playing songs he wrote or co-wrote and telling the stories behind them. In the spring of 2010, those shows would become "When Giants Walked the Earth – A Musical Memoir" with 50 tour dates in the Eastern U.S. and Canada. Shernoff sang "California Sun" in the official Major League Baseball promotional video for the 2010 All-Star Game. On March 24, 2012, Andy played the Reason Rally, the largest secular gathering in American history, on the National Mall in Washington DC. He released his first solo EP Don't Fade Away in October 2012. A follow-up EP, On The First Day Man Created God, was released in February 2013.

== Career ==
Shernoff grew up in New York City, in the Queens neighborhood of Jackson Heights. He attended elementary school with Johnny Thunders and Flushing High School with Peter Zaremba and Keith Streng of the Fleshtones. After high school, he attended the SUNY New Paltz Music Department. There he started the music magazine The Teenage Wasteland Gazette, known for its sarcastic, wise-guy attitude. The publication's contributors included famed rock critic Lester Bangs, who invited Andy to write for Creem magazine. Shernoff's early profession of choice was rock journalist.

As both a journalist and a musician, Andy Shernoff is often credited as "Adny Shernoff", a deliberate typo transposing the second and third letters of his name. Shernoff has never explained the reasoning behind this stylistic quirk.

=== The Dictators ===
While at SUNY New Paltz, Shernoff met Ross Friedman, aka Ross the Boss and they started a band with Scott Kempner. (Later members included roadie turned singer Handsome Dick Manitoba and several different drummers.)

The band then linked up with Blue Öyster Cult's management/producers Sandy Pearlman and Murray Krugman to record the first Dictators album, The Dictators Go Girl Crazy! for Epic in 1975. Shernoff penned the vast majority of the songs, a pattern that would continue throughout the group's career. Lauded by Trouser Press as a "wickedly funny, brilliantly played and hopelessly naïve masterpiece of self-indulgent smartass rock'n'roll", the album nonetheless failed to connect with the general public at the time and Epic dropped the band.

Disillusioned, Shernoff left the Dictators for a short time and was replaced on bass by Mark "The Animal" Mendoza before returning to the band, on keyboards. The group was signed to Asylum Records and released its second album, Manifest Destiny, in 1977. The album, also produced by Pearlman and Krugman, featured a more mainstream sound than The Dictators Go Girl Crazy! but once again the band failed to find an audience.

Shernoff was back playing bass in 1978 after Mendoza left the band, and the Dictators recorded their third album with Pearlman and Krugman, Bloodbrothers. Mainstream success continued to elude the band, and the members took a long break, reuniting occasionally for live concerts. Live recordings during this time were captured in the cassette-only Fuck 'Em If They Can't Take a Joke (ROIR, 1981), later released on CD as The Dictators Live, New York, New York (ROIR, 1998).

In the late 1990s, the Dictators began recording a new album, which was eventually released in 2001 as D.F.F.D. The album was named on several critics' Top 10 lists for the year, including the Denver Post and the Boston Globe. The band later released the live album Viva Dictators (2005) and the rarities compilation Every Day Is Saturday (2007).

=== Manitoba's Wild Kingdom ===
In the late 1980s, Shernoff formed Manitoba's Wild Kingdom with his Dictators bandmates Handsome Dick Manitoba and Ross the Boss. He wrote and produced the band's 1990 MCA Records debut, ...And You? which received warm reviews, national radio airplay and regular airplay on MTV for the video "The Party Starts Now!!".

=== The Master Plan ===
Shernoff's side project with the Waxing Poetics' Paul Johnson and Fleshtones Keith Streng and Bill Milhizer, the Master Plan, released its first album, Colossus of Destiny, in 2003. The band's second album, entitled Maximum Respect, was released in November 2009 in Europe by Nicotine Records and released in the U.S. in May 2010 on Steel Cage Records.

=== Solo artist ===
As a solo artist, Andy has focused on creating videos for his YouTube channel. He has produced videos for "Are You Ready to Rapture", "Let's Get The Band Back Together", "F*ck Christmas" (an Eric Idle song), "Laugh and Walk Away", "A Good Night to Say Goodbye" (a collaboration with Lydia Lunch), a tribute to Joey Ramone called "Sweet Joey" and a song parody of Blondie's "Dreaming" entitled "Streaming". He has also released two 7" singles and two CD EP's (listed below).

=== Other bands ===
Shernoff has also been a member of the bands The Resistance with Joey Ramone, The David Roter Method with Albert and Joe Bouchard, Andy Shernoff's Maximum R&B and The Bel-Airs. He has appeared as a guest musician on albums by the Ramones and the Fleshtones, as well as Joey Ramone's solo album.

=== Producer ===
As producer he has worked with The Dictators, The Master Plan, Manitoba's Wild Kingdom, The Figgs, Sin City Six, The Kowalskis, The Golden Horde, The Barracudas, The Untamed Youth, D Generation, The Connection, Skrap, Adrenalin OD, The Electric Playboys, The Smithereens, Prisonshake, Guided by Voices, The Waldos, The Connection, Daddy Long Legs, Amphetamine Discharge, The Bonzos, The Blue Chieftains, The Blood Drained Cows, Metadona, Alter Boys, Riff Raff, Stop, David Roter Method, Sibling Rivalry with Joey Ramone & Mickey Leigh, The Zantees with Billy Miller and Miriam Linna, Tongue Fu, Wheelers and Dealers, Sic F*cks with Tish and Snooky, and The Cyclones.

=== Songwriter ===
Andy wrote all the original songs for The Dictators and Manitoba's Wild Kingdom. His songs have also been recorded by The Ramones, Dee Dee Ramone, Joey Ramone, Mary Weiss, Dion DiMucci and The Little Kings, The Master Plan, Blue Coupe, Carolyne Mas, Turbonegro, The Hellacopters, Drivin 'N' Cryin, Baptized By Fire with Jesse Blaze Snider, The Del-Lords, Toilet Böys, Young Fresh Fellows, The A-Bones, The Nomads, The Untamed Youth, The Connection, The Dahlmanns, The 69 Eyes, The Sponsors, The Golden Arms, The Pleasure Fuckers, The Fastbacks, The Vikings, The David Roter Method, The Streetwalkin Cheetahs, Teengenerate, Texas Terri, Tom Clark, The Screaming Tribesman, The Smugglers, The Meatmen, Sex Museum, The Sons of Hercules, Electric Frankenstein, The Prissteens, Park Central Squares, The Alter Boys, The Hudson Falcons, Metal Mike, Tesco Vee, The Mighty Ions, Sismicos, Lawn Vultures, The Statics, The Persuaders, The Scared Stiffs, Furious George, Powder Monkeys, Parasites, Wanda Chrome & The Leather Pharaohs, Los Vivos, The Phanthom Fliers, Labanak, The Wretched Ones, Government Cheese, Angel Corpus Christi, Rick Blaze & The Ball Busters, Asteroid B612, Fifi & The Mach III, Jeff Dahl, The Loved Ones and Shock Treatment.

His songs have been in the following movies and television shows: Kindergarten Cop, Boys Don't Cry, Billions, Garage Days, Shot! the Psycho-Spiritual Mantra of Rock, Buffy the Vampire Slayer, We Are Twisted Fuckin Sister, Ticket to Write: The Golden Age of Rock Music Journalism, Knife Fight, Dance Me Outside, Mondo New York, Lillyhammer, Final Rinse, The Sex O'Clock News, Convenience Store, Alone in the Dark and The Way of the West.

His song "Faster and Louder" was used in the 2016 video game Call of Duty: Infinite Warfare.

=== Film appearances ===
- Shernoff is interviewed in the 2000 rockumentary DVD about the Sex Pistols, The Filth and the Fury, directed by Julien Temple.
- He performs in the movie TV Party, which premiered at the Tribeca Film Festival in 2005.
- He appears in the movie Final Rinse as a member of The Dictators 1999.
- He is interviewed in the Fleshtones documentary "Pardon Us For Living But The Graveyard Is Full" 2009
- He performs in the documentary about the Reason Rally, "March of Reason" 2012
- He appears in numerous photos from the Rock Critics Convention in the Big Star documentary, "Big Star: Nothing Can Hurt Me" 2013
- He is interviewed in the movie "Looking For Johnny, The Legend of Johnny Thunders" 2014

=== Books ===
Shernoff is quoted in the following books:

- From The Velvets to the Voidoids by Clinton Heylin (1993)
- Please Kill Me: The Uncensored Oral History of Punk by Legs McNeil and Gillian McCain (1997)
- Hey Ho Let's Go – The Story of The Ramones by Everett True (2002)
- On the Road With the Ramones by Monte A. Melnick and Frank Meyer (2003)
- The Heebie-Jeebies at CBGB's: A Secret History of Jewish Punk by Steven Beeber (2006)
- Sweat: The Story of the Fleshtones, America's Garage Band by Joe Bonomo (2007)
- "Andy Shernoff's Ten Rules for the Punk Rock Sommelier" appears in The Official Punk Rock Book of Lists, edited by Handsome Dick Manitoba and Amy Wallace (2007) – vide sommelier
- I Slept With Joey Ramone by Mickey Leigh with Legs McNeil (2009)
- All Hopped Up and Ready to Go by Tony Fletcher (2009)
- American Fun by John Beckman (2014)

== Discography ==
=== The Dictators ===
Title	Year	Label
The Dictators Go Girl Crazy!	1975	Epic Records
Manifest Destiny	1977	Asylum Records
Bloodbrothers	1978	Asylum Records
Fuck 'Em If They Can't Take a Joke	1981	ROIR
The Dictators Live, New York, New York	1998	ROIR
D.F.F.D.	2001	Dictators Multi/Media
Viva Dictators	2005	Dictators Multi/Media
Every Day Is Saturday	2007	Norton Records
Faster... Louder – The Dictators' Best 1975–2001	2014	Raven Records
The Dictators	2024	Valley Distribution

=== Manitoba's Wild Kingdom ===
Title	Year	Label
...And You?	1990	MCA Records

=== The Master Plan ===
Title	Year	Label
Colossus of Destiny	2003	Total Energy
Maximum Respect	2009	Nicotine Records

=== Solo Artist ===
Title	Year	Label
Under Assistant West Coast Promo Man (7")	2011	Norton Records
Are You Ready To Rapture b/w Make Me Tremble (7")	2011	Yazoo Squelch Audio Society
Don't Fade Away (CD, EP)	2013	Yazoo Squelch Audio Society
On The First Day Man Created God	2014	Yazoo Squelch Audio Society

=== Guest musician ===
Artist	Title	Year
The Ramones	Brain Drain	1989
The Fleshtones	Powerstance!	1991
The Ramones	Mondo Bizarro	1992
Joey Ramone	Live at the Bottom Line	1994
Joey Ramone	Don't Worry About Me	2002

=== Songwriter (selected) ===
Title	Artist	Album	Year
"Master Race Rock"	The Dictators	The Dictators Go Girl Crazy!	1975
"Sleepin' With the TV On"	The Dictators	Manifest Destiny	1977
"Stay With Me"	The Dictators	Bloodbrothers	1978
"The Party Starts Now!!"	Manitoba's Wild Kingdom	...And You?	1990
"I Won't Let It Happen" (co-writer)	The Ramones	Mondo Bizarro	1992
"Chinese Bitch" (co-writer)	Dee Dee Ramone	I Hate Freaks Like You	1994
"Stay With Me"	Dion Dimucci and The Little Kings	Live in New York	1996
"Find Something Beautiful" (co-writer)	David Roter Method	Find Something Beautiful	1997
"Who Will Save Rock and Roll?"	The Dictators	D.F.F.D.	2001
"Stop Thinking About It" (co-writer)	Joey Ramone	Don't Worry About Me	2002
"Kickin' It Old School"	The Master Plan	Colossus of Destiny	2004
"You're Never Gonna See Me Cry" (co-writer)	Mary Weiss	Dangerous Game	2007

== Other sources ==
- The DFFD Blog, "The Dictators Finally Make the Big League" Fox promo video featuring "California Sun" (June 2010)
- Bomp!, "Dictators Go Stir Crazy!" Andy Shernoff interview by Alan Betrock (winter 1976–1977)
- Trouser Press, "The Dictators Look for a Perfect Wave" Andy Shernoff and Scott Kempner interview by Ira Robbins (June 1978)
- I-94 Bar, "Lou Reed is a Creep: Discourse with Two Dictators"
- Perfect Sound Forever, "Cars'n'Girls: The Dictators", Andy Shernoff Interview by Billy Bob Hargus (May 1996)
- Tauschke, Steve (August 9, 2002). "Rulers of rock". The Age.
- allmusic, Andy Shernoff: Songs
