= Don't Worry About Me =

Studio album by Joey Ramone
- Released: February 19, 2002
- Recorded: 2000–2001
- Studio: Magic Shop, New York City; Water Music Studios, Hoboken, New Jersey; Baby Monster, New York City; Loho Studios, New York City
- Genre: Punk rock
- Length: 34:49
- Label: Sanctuary
- Producer: Daniel Rey

Joey Ramone chronology
Don't Worry About Me (2002)	Christmas Spirit... In My House (2002)

Singles from Don't Worry About Me
- 1. "What a Wonderful World" Released: 2002

Professional ratings
Review scores
Source	Rating
AllMusic	3/5 stars
Robert Christgau	B+
Entertainment Weekly	A−
Punknews.org	4.5/5 stars
Rolling Stone	3.5/5 stars
Spin	8/10
Uncut	4/5 stars

Don't Worry About Me is the first album released by Joey Ramone as a solo artist. It was released posthumously on February 19, 2002, by Sanctuary Records, less than a year after his death. The album was produced by Daniel Rey, who also did most of the guitar work. Rey had previously produced three of the Ramones' albums, between 1987 and 1995.

The album includes two covers: "What a Wonderful World," originally performed by Louis Armstrong, and "1969," originally performed by the Stooges. "What a Wonderful World" was used for the ending credits of Michael Moore's film Bowling for Columbine. It also appeared on the soundtrack to Freaky Friday.

A DualDisc version of the album was released on November 19, 2002. It included the album in the DVD-Audio format, which is in 5.1 surround sound, as well as the music video for "What a Wonderful World" (directed by Debbie Harry) and other material.

Don't Worry About Me peaked at #109 on the Billboard 200.

== Critical reception ==
The Austin Chronicle wrote that "though Ramones neophytes would be best served by starting at the beginning, Don't Worry About Me is a must for card-carrying superfans." Entertainment Weekly called the album "a testament to the uplifting power of rock." Now wrote that it "boasts better songwriting and playing than the last few Ramones albums, with Joey singing strong, free of any ironic or goofy pose." Wired wrote that "pointless guitar solos are evident on several tracks, but Joey's goofy teenage romanticism still manages to carry the day." Uncut compares the album favourably to Ramones releases, saying it is "no disrespect to say that the most successful tracks are the ones that do sound like the Ramones."

== Track listing ==
All tracks are written by Joey Ramone; except where indicated.

No.	Title	Writer(s)	Length
1.	"What a Wonderful World"	Bob Thiele, George David Weiss	2:23
2.	"Stop Thinking About It"	Ramone, Andy Shernoff	2:57
3.	"Mr. Punchy"		2:35
4.	"Maria Bartiromo"		3:58
5.	"Spirit in My House"		2:02
6.	"Venting (It's a Different World Today)"		3:17
7.	"Like a Drug I Never Did Before"		2:04
8.	"Searching for Something"	Ramone, Al Maddy	4:12
9.	"I Got Knocked Down (But I'll Get Up)"		3:42
10.	"1969"	Dave Alexander, James "Iggy Pop" Osterberg, Ron Asheton, Scott Asheton	3:40
11.	"Don't Worry About Me"		3:55

== Personnel ==
Credits adapted from the album's liner notes.

Musicians

- Joey Ramone – lead vocals (all tracks)
- Daniel Rey – guitars, backing vocals (tracks 1–7, 9 and 10)
- Al Maddy – guitars, bass, backing vocals (track 8)
- Mickey Leigh – guitars, backing vocals (track 11)
- Andy Shernoff – bass, backing vocals (tracks 1–7, 9 and 11)
- Jerry Only – bass (track 10)
- Marky Ramone – drums (tracks 1, 3, 4, 6, 7 and 8)
- Frank Funaro – drums (tracks 2, 5, 9 and 11)
- Dr. Chud – drums (track 10)
- Joe McGinty – keyboards (tracks 1, 5, 9 and 11)
- Veronica Kofman – backing vocals (track 3)
- Helen Love – backing vocals (track 3)
- Captain Sensible – backing vocals (track 3)

Technical

- Daniel Rey – producer, engineer, mixing
- Jon Marshall Smith – engineer, mixing
- Joe Blaney – mixing ("Don't Worry About Me")
- Noah Simon – assistant mixing engineer ("Don't Worry About Me")
- Howie Weinberg – mastering
- George Seminara – front cover photography
- George DuBose – package design
- Charlotte Lesher – executive producer
- Mickey Leigh – executive producer

== Charts ==
Chart (2002)	Peak position
Finnish Albums (Suomen virallinen lista)	25
UK Independent Albums (OCC)	19
US Billboard 200	109
