= The Dictators Go Girl Crazy! =

1975 studio album by the Dictators

- Cover photo by David Gahr

Studio album by the Dictators
- Released: March 1975
- Recorded: 1975
- Studio: CBS, New York City
- Genre: Punk rock
- Length: 34:48
- Label: Epic; Au Go Go (1989 Australian release)
- Producer: Murray Krugman, Sandy Pearlman

The Dictators chronology
The Dictators Go Girl Crazy! (1975)	Manifest Destiny (1977)

The Dictators Go Girl Crazy! is the debut album by American punk rock band the Dictators. It was released in March 1975 and is considered one of the first examples of punk rock.

== Response ==
=== Critical reception ===
Professional ratings
Review scores
Source	Rating
AllMusic	4.5/5 stars
Christgau's Record Guide	B+
Collector's Guide to Heavy Metal	9/10
Entertainment Weekly	A
Record Collector	4/5 stars
The Rolling Stone Album Guide	4/5 stars

The Dictators Go Girl Crazy! has been well-received critically and is considered a precursor to punk rock. In its retrospective review, AllMusic notes that while the album was confusing to audiences at the time of its release, it became inspirational for dozens of groups to follow. Trouser Press enthused that the band deserves "scads of credit" for "blazing a long trail, melding the essentials of junk culture... with loud/hard/fast rock'n'roll and thus creating an archetype". According to a 2001 article in The Village Voice, the album's "blueprint for bad taste, humor, and defiance" has been replicated in the work of such bands as the Ramones and Beastie Boys.

Trouser Press lauded the album as a "wickedly funny, brilliantly played and hopelessly naïve masterpiece of self-indulgent smartass rock'n'roll". Entertainment Weekly wrote: "Go Girl Crazy's junk-generation culture and smart-aleck sensibility did provide an essential blueprint for '70s punk. With its TV references and homely vocals, this ground-breaking and long-unavailable album continues to inspire underground groups everywhere." Canadian journalist Martin Popoff enjoyed the album and considered the Dictators "more obviously comedians than musicians", "with a sense of self-deprecating humor poking sticks at the seriousness of heavy metal".

Dave Marsh was less enthusiastic though, describing the record as a "banal collection of recycled 'Pipeline' instrumentals coupled with a vocalist who sounds, yes, precisely like a yowling wrestler on Saturday afternoon TV" in Rolling Stone, and giving the album zero stars in The Rolling Stone Record Guide.

=== Influence ===
In addition to this early punk rock influencing the style to come, the album was also one of two factors influencing the creation of Punk magazine by John Holmstrom and music journalist Legs McNeil. In Please Kill Me: The Uncensored Oral History of Punk, McNeil said that the album so resonated with him and his friends that they started the magazine strictly so they could "hang out with the Dictators".

== Track listing ==
All tracks are written by Andy Shernoff, except where noted.

Side one
No.	Title	Writer(s)	Length
1.	"The Next Big Thing"		4:20
2.	"I Got You Babe" (Sonny & Cher cover)	Sonny Bono	4:08
3.	"Back to Africa"		3:35
4.	"Master Race Rock"		4:13

Side two
No.	Title	Writer(s)	Length
1.	"Teengenerate"		3:24
2.	"California Sun" (Joe Jones cover)	Henry Glover, Morris Levy	3:04
3.	"Two Tub Man"		4:08
4.	"Weekend"		4:00
5.	"(I Live For) Cars and Girls"		3:56

== Personnel ==
The Dictators

- Andy Shernoff – lead and backing vocals, bass guitar
- Ross "The Boss" Friedman (aka Funichello) – lead guitar, backing vocals
- Scott Kempner – rhythm guitar
- Stu Boy King – drums, percussion

Additional musicians

- Handsome Dick Manitoba – lead vocals track 1, shared with Shernoff tracks: 2, 5 & 7 (Credited solely as "Secret Weapon")
- Allen Lanier (credited as Alan Glover) – keyboards on "Teengenerate" and "Cars and Girls"

Production

- Murray Krugman, Sandy Pearlman – producers
- Tim Geelan, Lou Waxman – engineers
- Ed Sprigg – mixing at the Record Plant, New York City and Kiel Auditorium, St. Louis
- Howie Lindeman, Robert "Corky" Stasiak – tape operators
- Greg Calbi – mastering at The Cutting Room, New York City
- David Gahr – front cover photography
- Borneo Jimmy – "inspiration"
