= Richard Manitoba =

American singer and radio personality (born 1954)

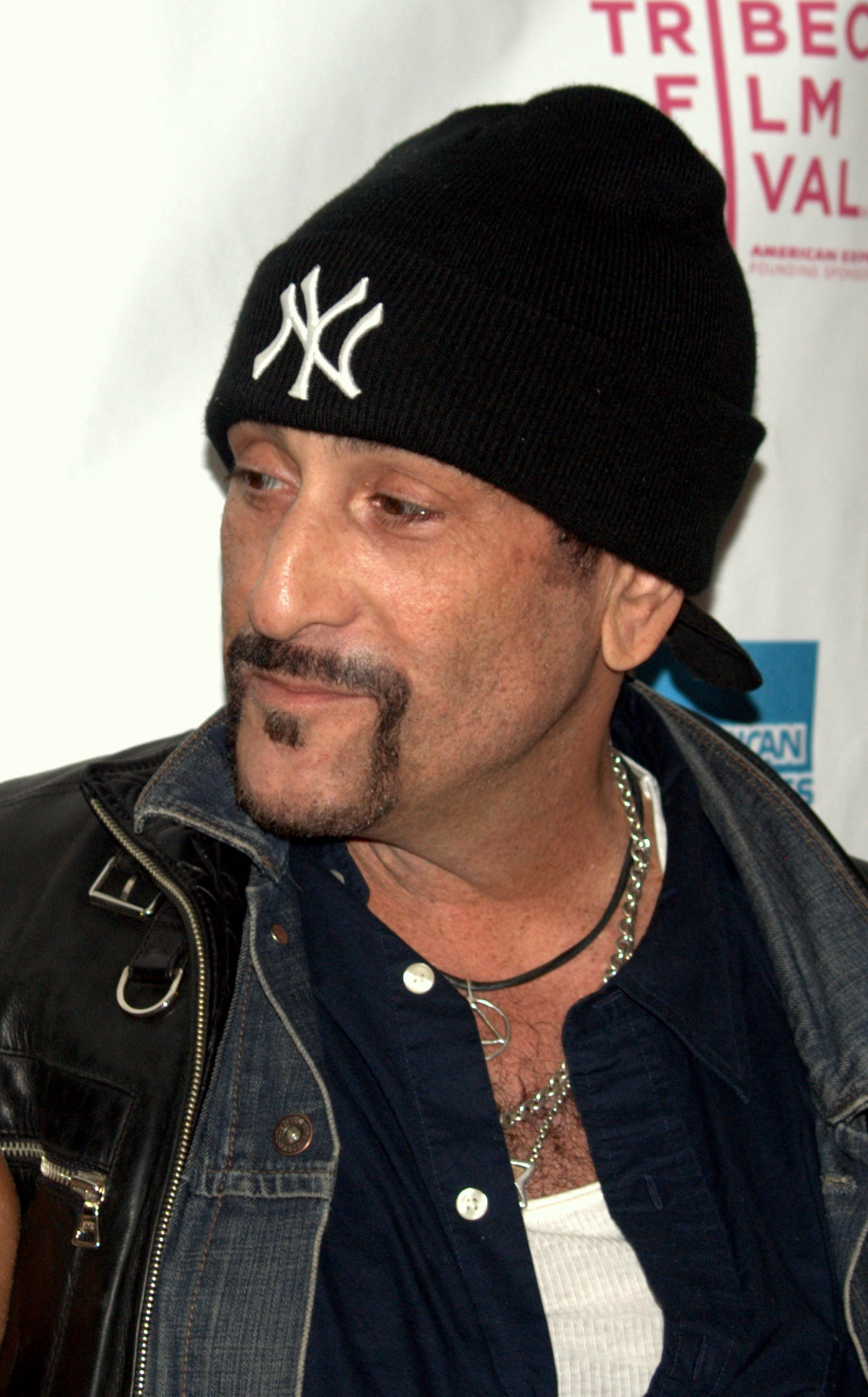
- Manitoba at the 2009 Tribeca Film Festival

Background information
- Also known as: Handsome Dick Manitoba
- Born: Richard Blum; January 29, 1954 (age 72); The Bronx, New York, U.S.
- Genre: Punk rock
- Occupations: Singer, radio personality
- Instrument: Vocals
- Years active: 1974–present
- Formerly of: The Dictators; MC5
- Website: handsomedickmanitoba.com

Richard Blum (born January 29, 1954), known by his stage name Handsome Dick Manitoba, is an American punk rock musician and radio personality. He was the singer of New York City-based band The Dictators from 1974 to 2008. With The Dictators, Manitoba sang on the albums The Dictators Go Girl Crazy! (1975), Manifest Destiny (1977), Bloodbrothers (1978), and D.F.F.D. (2005).

Manitoba also sang with a reunited version of MC5 from 2005 to 2012.

== Background ==
Manitoba is Jewish, and was raised in the Gun Hill Projects in the neighborhood of Williamsbridge, Bronx, New York City. He spent his last three teenage years living in Co-op City, Bronx, New York City. Manitoba was childhood friends with future bandmate, Scott "Top Ten" Kempner, since the 4th grade.

== The Dictators ==
Manitoba began as a roadie for The Dictators. He made his official stage debut with the band at Popeye's Spinach Factory in Sheepshead Bay, Brooklyn, in 1975.

The band's first major-label album, The Dictators Go Girl Crazy! (Epic Records, 1975), featured his picture on the cover and he was listed as the "Secret Weapon". While he sang some lead and some background, he was still considered a "mascot" of the band. He took on a larger singing role on The Dictators' second offering, Manifest Destiny, a 1977 release on the Asylum label. On Bloodbrothers, the third and final Dictators studio recording from the 1970s (Asylum, 1978), Manitoba sang lead vocals on most tracks. The Dictators disbanded in 1979.

Manitoba's red-sequined wrestling jacket has been on display at the Rock and Roll Hall of Fame since its opening in 1995.

On January 24, 1986, The Dictators played a reunion show at The Ritz in New York City.

== Manitoba's Wild Kingdom ==
In 1986, Manitoba, along with other former members of the Dictators, formed Wild Kingdom. In 1989, the band rebranded itself to Manitoba's Wild Kingdom and, in 1990, released an album ...And You? on MCA Records.

A re-formed Manitoba's Wild Kingdom played at the 2008 Joey Ramone Birthday Bash.

== Music career ==
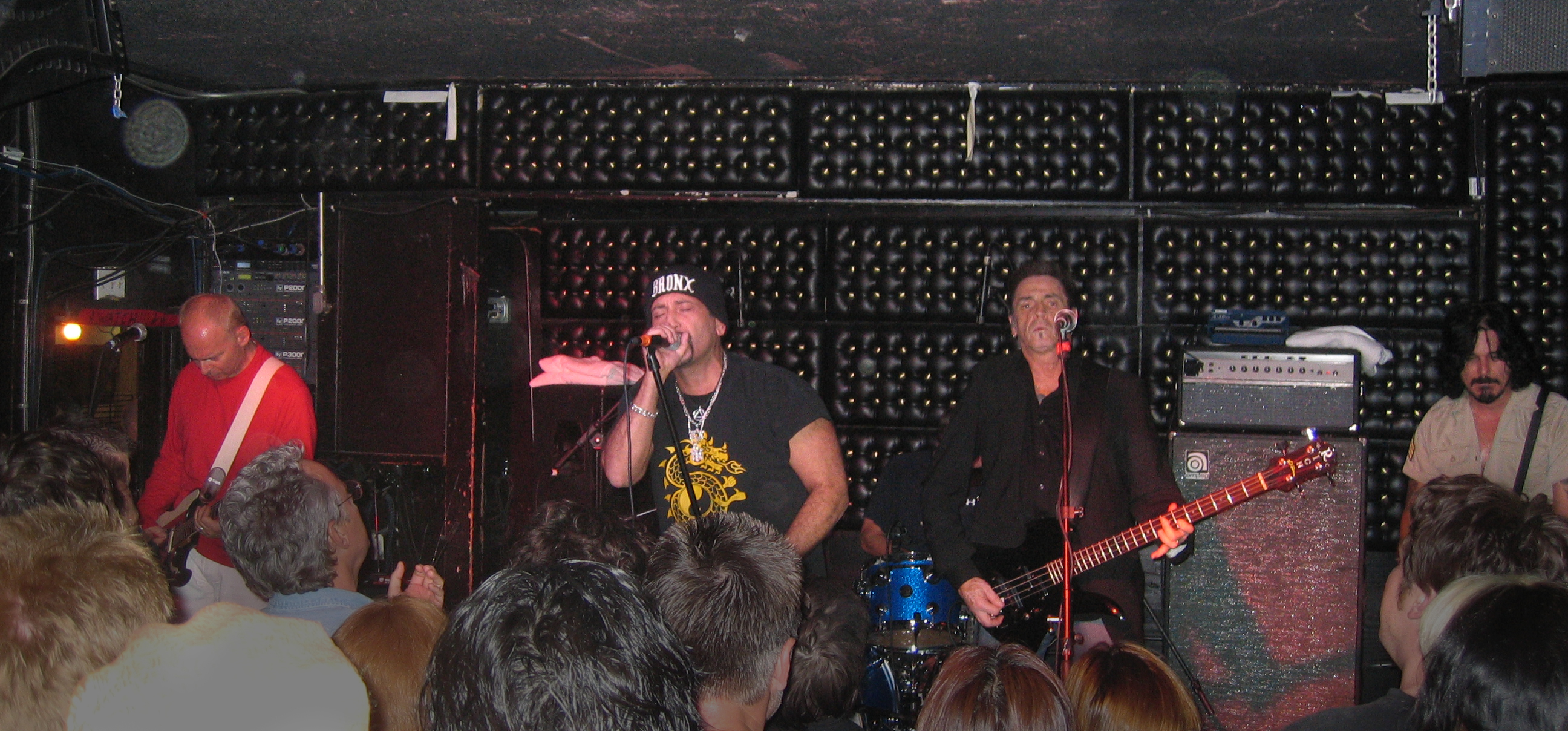
Manitoba performing with MC5 in 2005

Manitoba appeared in the 2004 documentary, Kiss Loves You.

In 2005, Manitoba joined the reformed MC5 on vocals. The band split up after the death of bassist Michael Davis in 2012.

In January 2012 the band Manitoba, featuring Manitoba, Ross the Boss, Dean Rispler (ex-Murphys Law), JP Paterson, and Daniel Rey, was formed to play the Light of the Day Festival in Asbury park, a benefit for medical charities. After a handful of shows, the band toured Europe in September 2012. In April 2013, the band was rebranded as The Dictators NYC.

A single, "Supply and Demand", composed by Ross the Boss, Manitoba, and Manitoba's son Jake, was backed with a live version of MC5's "Kick Out the Jams" and released in November 2015.

In July 2017, it was announced that the band name would be changed back to Manitoba "due to legal threats by ex-bandmates, Andy Shernoff and Scott Kempner".

On February 23, 2022, Manitoba performed with Keith Hartel, Mike Fornatale, Alec Morton, CP Roth, Tish Bellomo, Snooky Bellomo, and Arno Hecht(The Uptown Horns) at The Bowery Electric in New York City.

On December 28, 2022, Manitoba performed a live multi-media performance with Keith Hartel and Mike Fornatale on guitars and vocals at Berlin in New York City. The opening act was Adam Realman, "King of the Coney Island Freakshow". The performance was produced and directed by the Tony Mann, the theatrical leader of the show.

== Satellite radio DJ career ==
In 2004, Manitoba began hosting "The Handsome Dick Manitoba Radio Program" on Little Steven Van Zandt's Underground Garage channel on Sirius XM Radio. In 2005, the Village Voice awarded Manitoba "Best Satellite Radio DJ". Manitoba's show on Underground Garage continued for 14 years.

== Writing career ==
In 2007, Manitoba co-authored The Official Punk Rock Book of Lists with Amy Wallace.

== Podcasts and YouTube ==
From February 2019 to November 2021, Manitoba produced a podcast, You Don’t Know Dick.

Manitoba has a YouTube channel, Handsome Dick Manitoba show, that was last updated in April 2023. It has 343 subscribers as of February 2024.

== Solo discography ==
=== Studio ===
- Born in the Bronx (2019) - on Liberation Records, distributed by MVD. Included on this CD is a cover of Barry McGuire's 1965 hit Eve of Destruction.

== Legal issues ==
In 2004, Manitoba threatened to sue independent electronic musician Dan Snaith for using the band name "Manitoba". Snaith changed his musical name to Caribou.

Manitoba pleaded guilty to disorderly conduct, in New York State on May 3, 2018, after an incident with the mother of his child, Zoe Hansen.
