= Dan Reich =

American entrepreneur

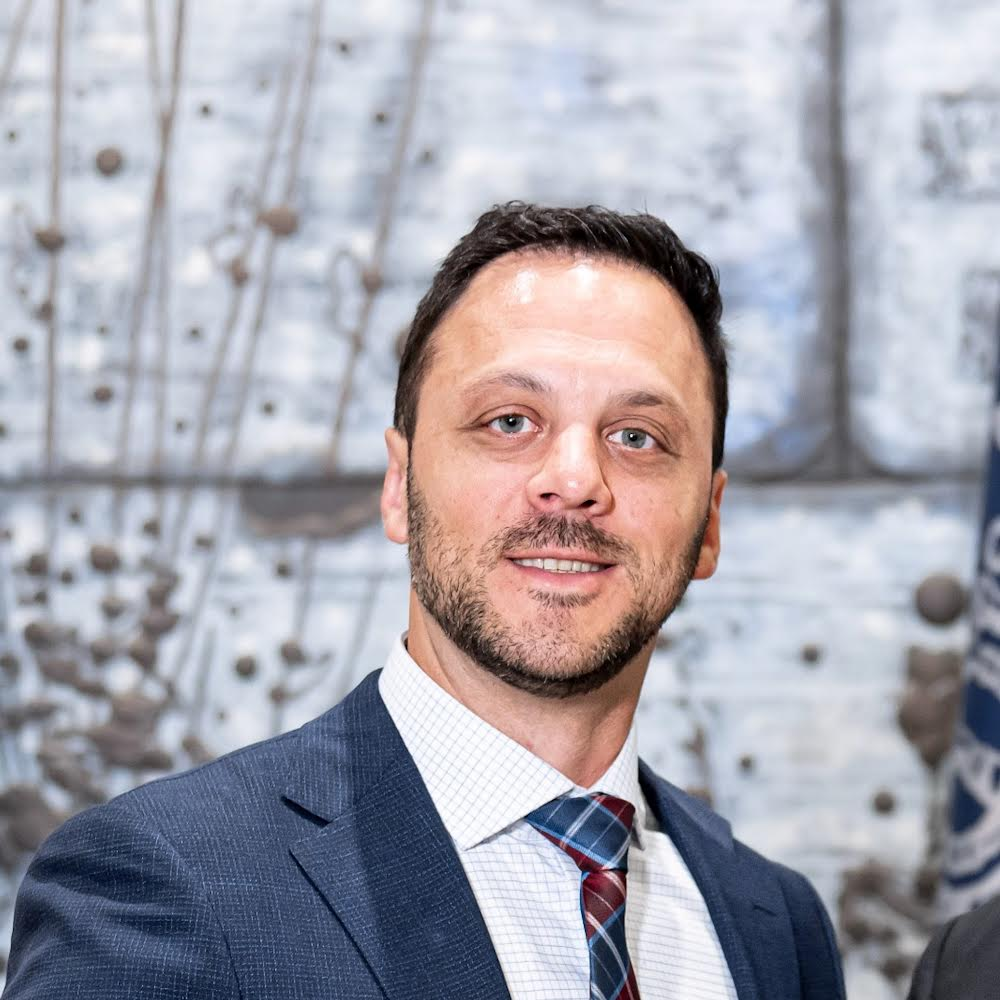
- Education: University of Wisconsin–Madison (BS)
- Occupations: Entrepreneur, investor
- Years active: 2010–present
- Known for: Co-founding Spinback, Tula Skincare, Troops.ai and Dibs Beauty
- Website: danreich.com

Dan Reich is an American entrepreneur and investor. He co-founded Spinback, which was acquired by Buddy Media in 2011; Tula Skincare, acquired by Procter & Gamble in 2022; Troops.ai, acquired by Salesforce in 2022; and Dibs Beauty.

== Education and career ==
Reich graduated from the University of Wisconsin’s College of Engineering in 2008 and received the university business school's inaugural.

=== Spinback ===
In 2010, he founded Spinback with a friend from college. The company created software that helped online brands and retailers measure how much money they were making from social media channels.

In 2011, while raising funding, Spinback was acquired by Buddy Media in a cash-and-stock deal. Reich stayed with Buddy Media until 2012, when it was acquired by Salesforce for $689 million.

=== Tula ===
In 2014, Reich co-founded Tula Skincare with Dr. Roshini Raj and Ken Landis. The company used natural ingredients to help make products that increased healthy skin. The company initially was successful selling products through QVC and in 2017 they received an investment from L Catterton which allowed them to expand to sales channels such as Sephora and, ULTA where they became the top selling skincare brand. The company was sold to Procter & Gamble in 2022 after reaching a $150M in annual sales.

=== Troops.ai ===
In 2015, Reich co-founded Troops.ai with Scott Britton and Greg Ratner. Troops is a software company that builds “Slackbots” that integrate with the Slack customer relationship platform. Troops works with Salesforce so employees can search for records and schedule automatic reports. The company raised $22 million from investors Aspect Ventures, with participation from the Slack Fund, First Round Capital, Felicis Ventures, Susa Ventures, Chicago Ventures, Hone Capital, and InVision founder Clark Valberg.

In 2022, Salesforce announced it had acquired Troops.ai for an undisclosed amount though, Business Insider reported the company’s valuation at $66 million several months before the acquisition.

=== Dibs Beauty ===
In 2021 Reich launched Dibs Beauty with Bobbi Brown Cosmetics co-founder Kan Landis; entrepreneur Courtney Shields; and the former COO of ARod Corp Jeff Lee. The company which is short for Desert Island Beauty Status, started with an initial round of $2.6 million from its founders and L Catteron partners, Michael Farello and Jonathan Owsley. L Catterton made an additional investment in 2023.

== Cryptocurrency wallet ==
In 2018, Reich and his friend Jesse spent $50,000 in Bitcoin to purchase a new coin called Theta Coin. The coins were initially kept on a Chinese exchange but a government crackdown forced the investors to switch to a Trezor One hardware wallet with a pin. After several months the coin had decreased in value and they decided they wanted to sell the Theta Coin.

The wallet they had utilized had a security measure that would erase all the data on the drive if the correct pin wasn’t entered within the first sixteen attempts. After incorrectly guessing the pin twelve times, they decided to just write off the loss since the value was estimated at only $12,000.

By 2020, the value of their coins had risen to over a couple million dollars and they were desperate to find someone who could help them recover their assets. In February if 2021, with their wallet worth $2.5 million, they employed an electrical engineer and hacker named Joe Grand, known by his handle Kingpin.

Joe was able to defeat the wallet and recover the pin by employing a combination strategies that two previous hackers had employed which both centered on switching the security level of the wallet by introducing varying electrical currents to fool the wallet into copying the pin to the temporary RAM where it could be retrieved safely.

The coins were successfully recovered, the engineer received his pay and soon afterwards the manufacturers of the Trezor One wallet issued an update and release saying the security breaches had been fixed with their new software updates.
