= The Dictators =

American rock band

- Origin: New York City, U.S.
- Genres: Punk rock; proto-punk; hard rock
- Years active: 1972–1975; 1976–1980; 1995–2009; 2020–present
- Labels: Epic; Asylum; Norton
- Spinoffs: Manitoba's Wild Kingdom
- Members: Andy Shernoff; Albert Bouchard; Keith Roth
- Past members: Ross "The Boss" Friedman; Scott "Top Ten" Kempner; Richard Manitoba; J.P. Patterson; Stu Boy King; Ritchie Teeter; Mark Mendoza; Mel Anderson; Frank Funaro
- Website: thedictators.com

The Dictators are an American punk rock band formed in New York City in 1972. Known for their acerbic and provocative approach in their music, the Dictators underwent several changes in their lineups. Its founding members included musicians Andy "Adny" Shernoff (bass, keyboards, vocals), Ross "The Boss" Friedman (lead guitar) and Scott "Top Ten" Kempner (rhythm guitar). Other long-term members have included "Handsome" Dick Manitoba (vocals) and Mark "The Animal" Mendoza (bass). Throughout varying lineups, Shernoff, Friedman and Kempner have been constant members.

With albums like The Dictators Go Girl Crazy!, Manifest Destiny and Bloodbrothers, the Dictators did not initially have any commercial success outside the punk rock scene in the 1970s and courted some controversies, but later grew to be respected as one of the pioneers in punk rock with a strong cult following. Critic John Dougan said that they were "one of the finest and most influential proto-punk bands to walk the earth."

== History ==
=== Origins ===
The band was formed in 1972 by Andy "Adny" Shernoff, who was attending the State University of New York at New Paltz, and Ross "The Boss" Friedman who was playing in a local band called Total Crudd. Scott "Top Ten" Kempner was asked to join, and the trio rented a house in Kerhonkson, New York, where they lived and rehearsed with various drummers.

The original recording line-up consisted of vocalist/bassist/songwriter Andy Shernoff, Friedman on lead guitar, Scott Kempner on rhythm guitar, and drummer Stu Boy King. They recorded their 1975 debut album, The Dictators Go Girl Crazy! for Epic Records, produced by manager Sandy Pearlman, and Murray Krugman, both best known for their work with Blue Öyster Cult). Pearlman was also instrumental in crafting the image of the Dictators, where roadie and "secret weapon" Richard Blum, who also joined the lineup of the band, was named Handsome Dick Manitoba. Pearlman also suggested that Friedman use the surname "Funichello", but Friedman disliked it and the name was used once for the album.

The Dictators Go Girl Crazy! sold poorly at the time but is now considered to be a starting point for American punk rock. Entertainment Weekly wrote, "Go Girl Crazy's junk-generation culture and smart-aleck sensibility did provide an essential blueprint for '70s punk. With its TV references and homely vocals, this ground-breaking and long-unavailable album continues to inspire underground groups everywhere." In a 2006 book, The Heebie-Jeebies at CBGB's, Steven Beeber argued that this all-Jewish band was an early musical expression in rock music of the New York sarcasm and toughness found among this alienated population, who significantly contributed to NYC punk rock.

Frustrated by the lack of sales, the band broke up for a few months in late 1975, but reconvened in early 1976, with bassist Mark "The Animal" Mendoza replacing Shernoff and Ritchie Teeter replacing King. After a few months Shernoff was persuaded to return to the group as the group's keyboardist. This line-up soon secured a contract with Asylum Records (at least partly due to the notoriety the group had developed following a well-publicized brawl between Manitoba and singer Jayne County, then billed as Wayne County) and released their second album, Manifest Destiny, in 1977. The album was produced by Pearlman and Krugman with songs written by Shernoff. Andy Shernoff observed the growing fanbase of the band, and employed a commercial sound in Manifest Destiny, stating that it was necessary to not "fuck things up". "Handsome" Dick Manitoba later recalled that in Manifest Destiny, the commercial sound, which he described as "zero punk" and "overproduced" did not reflect what he considered the ethos of the Dictators, "rock and roll snotty". Ross "The Boss" Friedman was more forgiving of Manifest Destiny, describing it as "experimental" and acknowledging that Shernoff went "wild on his pop side": Friedman then reflected on his guitar works in the album and was favorable to some of the songs, such as "Steppin' Out".

Early in 1978, Mendoza had left the band (soon joining Twisted Sister), and Shernoff had returned to his original position on bass guitar. It was this line-up of Manitoba, Shernoff, Friedman, Kempner, and Teeter which recorded Bloodbrothers (yet again produced by Pearlman and Krugman with songs written by Shernoff). It was the first album to feature Manitoba as the group's vocalist on all the songs, though Bruce Springsteen–a big fan of the group to this day–can be heard counting "1-2-1-2-3-4" during the album's opening track, "Faster and Louder." The album's "Baby, Let's Twist" was a minor hit on a number of East Coast radio stations, but the lack of mainstream success caused the band to split again the following year. Shortly before the split, drummer Mel Anderson had left Twisted Sister and joined The Dictators, replacing Teeter.

=== 1980s ===
After the break-up, Manitoba drove a taxi cab, Shernoff worked as a record producer and songwriter and Friedman worked first with the French hard-rock band Shakin' Street, and then became a founding member of Manowar in 1982 (with whom he recorded the band's first six albums, leaving the band after the 1988 album Kings of Metal), and producing the first demo for Anthrax.

The members of the band began reuniting occasionally and in 1981, ROIR released the cassette-only Fuck 'Em If They Can't Take a Joke produced by Andy Shernoff, which featured numbers from all three of the group's studio albums, covers of the Velvet Underground's "What Goes On" and Mott the Hoople's "The Moon Upstairs," plus two new Shernoff numbers, "Loyola" and "New York New York".

Other than occasional reunion shows, little was heard from The Dictators during the next five years. However, in late 1986 Shernoff and Manitoba (along with guitarist Daniel Rey) formed Wild Kingdom, releasing a version of "New York New York" on the 1988 soundtrack to Mondo New York.

=== 1990s ===
In 1990, MCA Records released the Wild Kingdom debut, ...And You? written and produced by Andy Shernoff, though they were now billed as Manitoba's Wild Kingdom to avoid a lawsuit from the TV show Wild Kingdom. By this time Rey had left the group and had been replaced by Friedman (the group was rounded out by drummer J.P. Patterson). ...And You? - a brief 25 minutes in length - received excellent reviews, with Rolling Stone calling it "the first great punk rock album of the '90s."

The ...And You? album cover was a source of some controversy, since it was lifted from a World War II Nazi recruiting poster. It was not the first time members of the band (most of whom were Jewish) had been associated with charges of this sort since Go Girl Crazy had featured the songs "Master Race Rock" and "Back to Africa."

By the 1990s, much about the lives of the band's members had changed markedly. Shernoff recorded and toured with The Fleshtones in 1989 and 1990, wrote and recorded with The Ramones, became a successful record producer and worked as a sommelier. Manitoba opened an East-Village bar called Manitoba's in 1999. Kempner had developed a certain degree of respect from roots-rock audiences due to his 1980s work with The Del-Lords. In 1992, he released his solo album Tenement Angels and joined The Brandos in 1993. Friedman's work with Manowar and Brain Surgeons had given him a certain cachet with heavy metal audiences.

However, the group - first with Frank Funaro on drums, then again with Patterson - began recording a new Dictators album written and produced by Andy Shernoff in the late 1990s, which was eventually released as D.F.F.D. in 2001. AllMusic called the album a "non-stop barrage of spitfire precision rock. The material is, unbelievably, their best and most consistent ever for an album".

=== 2000s ===
The Dictators continued to perform to a devoted audience releasing a live album, Viva Dictators in 2005, produced by Shernoff. In 2007, they compiled an album of demos, rarities, and unreleased songs which were recorded at various times over their thirty-plus year career called Every Day Is Saturday on Norton Records. The title was a line in the song "Weekend" from the band's first album The Dictators Go Girl Crazy.

Shernoff formed The Master Plan with The Fleshtones' Keith Streng, releasing Colossus of Destiny on Alive-Total Energy Records in 2003, and Maximum Respect on Green Mist Records in 2011.

Manitoba sang with the surviving members of the MC5 and worked as a DJ in Little Steven's Underground Garage on Sirius XM Radio, till he was fired, then re-hired to work on Steven's station, which did not work out, as he left in January 2018.

In October 2006, the band (Manitoba, Shernoff, Friedman, Patterson, Kempner) headlined the second and third to last shows ever at CBGB. The second to last show featured Blondie on the bill as well, and during the Dictators final song on the CBGB stage, they were joined by Tommy Ramone, the last surviving original member of The Ramones for a rendition of the Ramones song "Blitzkrieg Bop".

In November 2007, Manitoba, along with author Amy Wallace, put out The Official Punk Rock Book of Lists on BackBeat Books, a small book company owned by Hal Leonard Publishing.

Manitoba's Wild Kingdom reunited in May 2008 to play at the Joey Ramone Birthday Bash at The Fillmore New York at Irving Plaza, with a lineup featuring Manitoba, Shernoff, Friedman and Patterson.

In July 2008, Kempner released his second solo album Saving Grace.

In October 2008, The Dictators reunited for a series of four concerts in Spain.

Ross The Boss released his debut solo album, New Metal Leader, in August 2008. He and his band have released their second album Hailstorm in 2010.

Patterson released his second album, entitled The LP Is Dead, in November 2009 via No Fun Records.

=== 2010s ===
Kempner and the rest of The Del-Lords re-united in early 2010 for a successful tour of Spain and began working on an album of all new material. Kempner's first solo album, Tenement Angels, was released on March 1, 2011, on GB Music. The release is on CD (remastered with a bonus track) and on vinyl. The LP is a limited edition on 500, and comes with a digital download and a hand signed poster by Kempner.

Manitoba, Ross the Boss, Dean Rispler (ex-Murphys Law), JP Paterson, and Daniel Rey formed Manitoba in January 2012. In April 2013, the band changed its name to The Dictators NYC. A single "Supply and Demand," composed by Boss, Manitoba, and Manitoba's son Jake, and backed with a live version of the MC5's "Kick Out the Jams," was released in November 2015. In July 2017, it was announced that the band name would be changed back to Manitoba, "due to legal threats by ex-bandmates, Andy Shernoff and Scott Kempner". In December of that year the band announced it had broken up.

Shernoff released his first solo EP Don't Fade Away on Yazoo Squelch Records in 2012. Critic Mark Deming wrote "the man is still writing excellent songs and singing them straight from the heart, which is what his best work has always been about, and it's great news that well over three decades into his career, he's still got fresh and worthwhile things to say." He released his second EP On The First Day, Man Created God in 2013 again on Yazoo Squelch records. In August 2015, he released a video collaboration with Lydia Lunch for the song "A Good Night To Say Goodbye". Another video to celebrate Joey Ramone's 65th birthday was released on May 15, 2016.

Former member Richard Teeter, who played drums for The Dictators between 1976 and 1979, died on April 10, 2012, due to complications from esophageal cancer. He was 61.

In November 2015, Go Girl Crazy! received an expanded and remastered CD reissue, featuring several unreleased selections and remixes of three tunes by Andrew W.K.

On May 1, 2018, the Dictators original drummer, Stuart 'Stu Boy' King, died from pancreatic cancer.

In November 2019, Manitoba released his first solo album Born in the Bronx.

=== 2020s ===
On May 28, 2020, Andy Shernoff announced that the Dictators were reforming to record some new material and possibly play live, with a line-up comprising Shernoff on bass and vocals, Ross The Boss and Kempner on guitars and Albert Bouchard (formerly of Blue Öyster Cult) on drums. On January 8, 2021, Shernoff announced on Facebook that a new Dictators song and video would be released on January 15. On April 6 that year, the Dictators announced "Scott Kempner will be leaving the band due to health reasons." On October 18, the band announced that Keith Roth (David Johansen, Earl Slick, Cherie Currie, Cheetah Crome) would join the band on vocals and guitar. Kempner died from complications of dementia in a nursing home in Connecticut on November 29, 2023, at the age of 69. The Dictators released their sixth album The Dictators in September 2024. On February 9, 2026, Friedman announced that he had been diagnosed with amyotrophic lateral sclerosis. He died of the disease a month later, on March 26, at the age of 72.

== Members ==
=== Current ===
- Andy Shernoff – bass guitar (1973–1975, 1978–1980, 1995–2008, 2020–present), keyboards (1976–1980, 1995–2008, 2020–present), lead and backing vocals (1973–1975, 1976–1980, 1995–2008, 2020–present)
- Albert Bouchard – drums, backing and lead vocals (2020–present)
- Keith Roth – lead and backing vocals, rhythm guitar (2021–present), lead guitar (2026–present)

=== Former ===
- Ross "The Boss" Friedman – lead guitar, backing vocals (1973–1975, 1976–1980, 1995–2008, 2020–2026; died 2026)
- Scott "Top Ten" Kempner – rhythm guitar (1973–1975, 1976–1980, 1995–2008, 2020–2021; died 2023)
- Richard Manitoba – lead vocals (1974–1975, 1976–1980, 1995–2008)
- Stu Boy King – drums (1974–1975, died 2018)
- Ritchie Teeter – drums, backing and occasional lead vocals (1976–1979; died 2012)
- Mark Mendoza – bass guitar, backing vocals (1976–1977)
- Mel "Starr" Anderson – drums (1979–1980)
- Frank Funaro – drums (1995–1998)
- J.P. Patterson – drums, backing vocals (1998–2008)

== Discography ==
=== Studio albums ===
- The Dictators Go Girl Crazy! (1975)
- Manifest Destiny (1977) No. 193 Billboard 200
- Bloodbrothers (1978)
- ...And You? (1990) [Manitoba's Wild Kingdom]
- D.F.F.D. (2001)
- The Dictators (2024)

=== Live albums ===
- Fuck 'Em If They Can't Take a Joke (ROIR, 1981)
- The Dictators Live, New York, New York (ROIR, 1998)
- Viva Dictators (2005)

=== Singles/EPs ===
- "Search & Destroy" (1977)
- "Hey Boys" (1977)
- "Heartache" (1977)
- "I Am Right" (1996)
- "Who Will Save Rock 'N' Roll?" (1997)
- "Avenue A" (2001)
- "16 Forever" (2007)
- "The Next Big Thing" EP (2015)
- "God Damn New York" (2021)
- "Let's Get the Band Back Together" (2021)
- "Festivus" (2021)
- "Crazy Horses" (2023)
- "My Imaginary Friend" (2024)
- "Live In Spain" (2024)

=== Compilations ===
- Every Day Is Saturday (2007)
- Faster... Louder – The Dictators' Best 1975–2001 (2014)

== Sources ==
- Larkin, Colin, ed. (1995). The Guinness Who's Who of Indie and New Wave Music (Second ed.). Guinness Publishing. ISBN 0-85112-657-X.
