= The Blue Chieftains =

American alt-country band (1988–1993, 1997)

The Blue Chieftains were a New York City-based alternative country band formed by Tim Carroll, the band's singer-songwriter and guitarist. The band's other members were Mark Horn (drums), Stephen B. Antonakos (slide guitar and vocals), and Scott Yoder (bass). The band was active for five years before breaking up in 1993, during which time they played about 200 shows. The band never released a studio album of their own. Their studio contributions were limited to some tracks they contributed to three "Rig Rock" compilation albums, as well as two of their own singles, all of which were released on Diesel Only Records. In 2002, the band released a live album entitled That's All on Real-O-Mind Records. This album contains 18 lo-fi recordings of the band playing at a May 1997 reunion show at Coney Island High in New York.
