= Joey Ramone =

American punk rock singer (1951–2001)

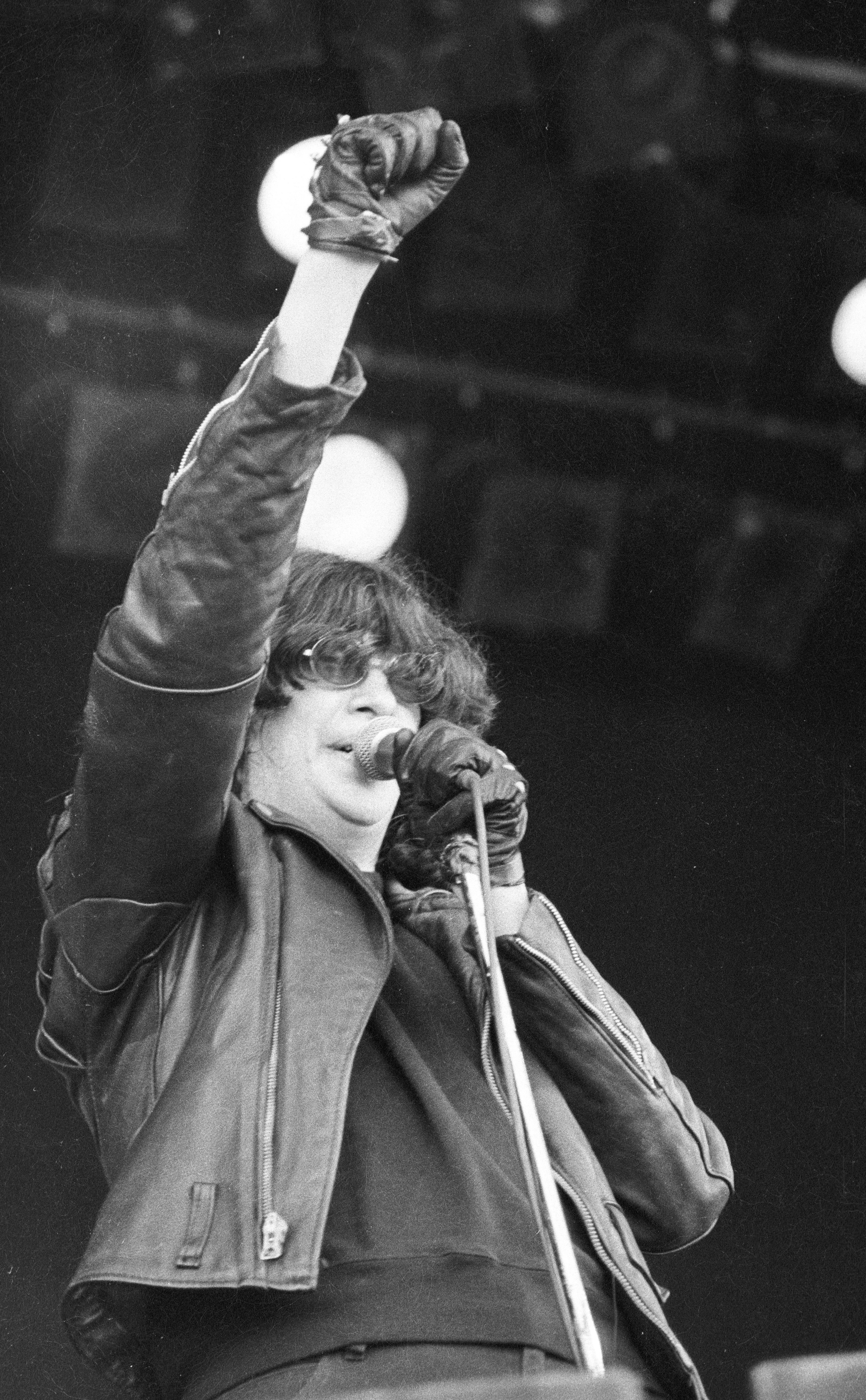
- Ramone c. 1980s

Background information
- Also known as: Joey Ramone; Jeff Starship
- Born: Jeffrey Ross Hyman; May 19, 1951; New York City, U.S.
- Died: April 15, 2001 (aged 49) New York City, U.S.
- Genre: Punk rock
- Occupations: Singer; songwriter
- Years active: 1972–2001
- Formerly of: Ramones; Sibling Rivalry; Sniper
- Website: joeyramone.com

Jeffrey Ross Hyman (May 19, 1951 – April 15, 2001), known professionally as Joey Ramone, was an American singer who was the lead vocalist and founding member of the punk rock band Ramones, with Johnny Ramone and Dee Dee Ramone. His image, voice, and tenure with the Ramones made him a countercultural icon.

Born to a Jewish family in Queens, New York City, he was diagnosed with obsessive-compulsive disorder and suffered a psychotic episode at age 18. After playing in the glam punk band Sniper from 1972 to 1974, Joey cofounded the Ramones in 1974. Initially the band's drummer, Joey switched to lead vocals shortly after the group's formation. Appearing on all the band's releases, he, along with guitarist Johnny Ramone, are the only two original members who stayed in the band until it disbanded in 1996.

Following the Ramones' breakup, he embarked on a solo career before dying of lymphoma in 2001. His debut solo album Don't Worry About Me was released the following year.

== Early life ==
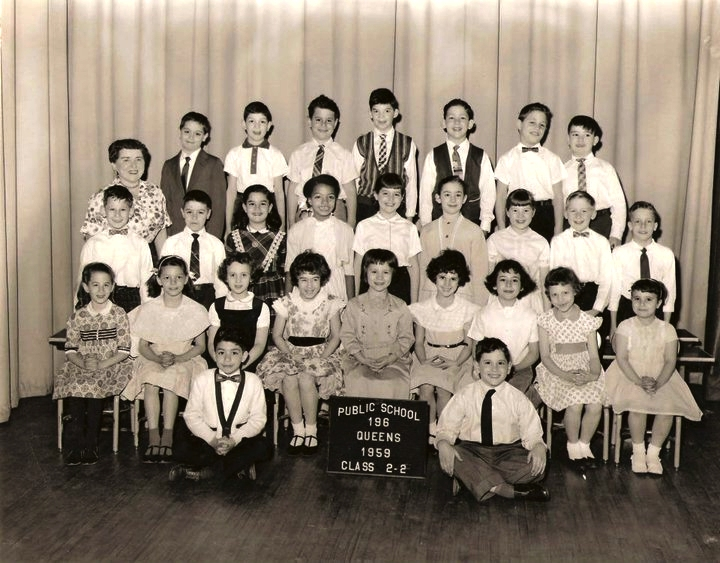
Hyman 2nd-grade class photo 1959 PS196 Queens, NY (back row center)

Jeffrey Ross Hyman was born on May 19, 1951, in Queens, New York City, to a Jewish family. His parents were Charlotte (née Mandell, later Lesher, 1926–2007) and Noel Hyman (1919–2000). It has been claimed he was born with a parasitic twin growing out of his back, which was incompletely formed and surgically removed. He had a younger brother named Mikey Leigh, who is also a singer-songwriter. The family resided in Forest Hills, Queens, where Hyman and his future Ramones bandmates attended Forest Hills High School. Though generally a happy person, Hyman described himself as a misfit and loner as a child. He was diagnosed at 18 with obsessive–compulsive disorder. His striking physique has been attributed to Marfan syndrome and his health was often frail. His mother, Charlotte Lesher, owned an art gallery in Queens. After divorcing her first husband, Noel Hyman, she married again but was widowed when her second husband died in a car accident while she was on vacation.

Hyman began playing the drums when he was 13 years old. He was a fan of the Beatles, the Who, David Bowie, and the Stooges among other bands, particularly oldies and the Phil Spector-produced girl groups. The Who in particular inspired him when he saw them perform at the age of 16.

== Career ==
=== Sniper ===
In 1972 Hyman joined the glam punk band Sniper. Sniper played at the Mercer Arts Center, Max's Kansas City and the Coventry, alongside New York Dolls, Suicide, and Queen Elizabeth III. Hyman played with Sniper under the name Jeff Starship. Hyman continued playing with Sniper until early 1974, when he was replaced by Alan Turner.

=== Ramones ===
In 1974, Jeffrey Hyman co-founded the punk rock band the Ramones with friends John Cummings and Douglas Colvin. Colvin was already using the pseudonym "Dee Dee Ramone" and the others also adopted stage names using "Ramone" as their surname: Cummings became Johnny Ramone and Hyman became Joey Ramone. The name "Ramone" stems from Paul McCartney: he briefly used the stage name "Paul Ramon" during 1960–61, when the Beatles, still an unknown five-piece band called the Silver Beetles, did a tour of Scotland and all took up pseudonyms; and again on the 1969 Steve Miller album Brave New World, where he played the drums on one song using that name.

Joey Ramone initially served as the group's drummer while Dee Dee Ramone was the original vocalist. However, when Dee Dee's vocal cords proved unable to sustain the demands of constant live performances, the Ramones manager Thomas Erdelyi suggested Joey switch to vocals. Mickey Leigh:

I was shocked when the band came out. Joey was the lead singer and I couldn't believe how good he was. Because he'd been sitting in my house with my acoustic guitar, writing these songs like 'I Don't Care', fucking up my guitar, and suddenly he's this guy on stage who you can't take your eyes off of.

After a series of unsuccessful auditions in search of a new drummer, Erdelyi took over on drums, assuming the name Tommy Ramone.

In a 1988 press bio, Ramone described the origin of the Ramones:

We decided to start our group because we were bored with everything we heard in the early '70s – there was nothing to listen to anymore. Everything was tenth generation Elton John or just junk. Everything was long jams, long guitar solos. We missed hearing songs that were short and exciting...and good! We wanted to bring energy back to rock & roll.

— David Dalton, press bio (1988), Joey Ramone

The Ramones were a major influence on the punk rock movement in the United States, though they achieved only minor commercial success. Their only record with enough U.S. sales to be certified gold in Ramone's lifetime was the compilation album Ramones Mania. Recognition of the band's importance built over the years, and they are now represented in many assessments of all-time great rock music, such as the Rolling Stone lists of the 50 Greatest Artists of All Time and 25 Greatest Live Albums of All Time, VH1's 100 Greatest Artists of Hard Rock, and Mojo's 100 Greatest Albums. In 2002, the Ramones were voted the second greatest rock and roll band ever in Spin, behind the Beatles.

In 1996, after a tour with the Lollapalooza music festival, the band played its final show and then disbanded.

=== Other projects ===
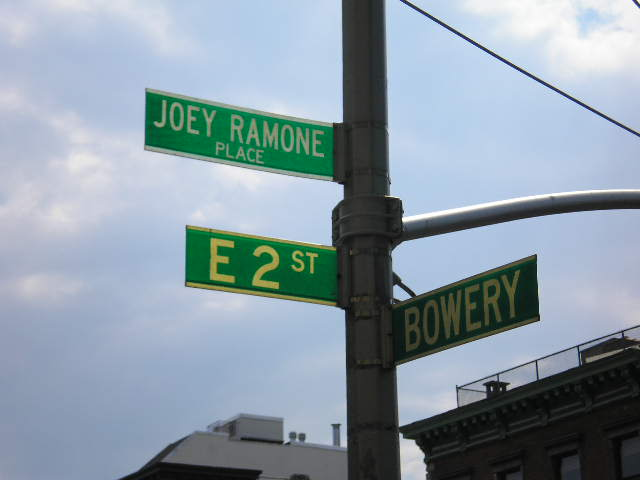
Ramone was honored with the creation of "Joey Ramone Place" outside the address of CBGB in New York City.

One of Ramone's earliest side projects was with a band called the Seclusions in 1983. Ramone sang vocals alongside his brother Leigh on a cover of the song "Nothing Can Change the Shape of Things to Come" from the album Isolation For Creation. Also appearing on the track were Jimmy Destri, Holly Beth Vincent, Jimmy Ripp, Busta Jones, and Jay Dee Daugherty.

In 1985, Ramone joined Steven Van Zandt's music industry activist group Artists United Against Apartheid, which campaigned against the Sun City resort in South Africa. Ramone and 49 other recording artists – including Bob Dylan, Bruce Springsteen, Keith Richards, Lou Reed and Run DMC – collaborated on the song "Sun City", in which they pledged they would never perform at the resort.

In 1994, Ramone appeared on the Helen Love album Love and Glitter, Hot Days and Music, singing the track "Punk Boy". Helen Love returned the favor, singing on Ramone's song "Mr. Punchy".

In October 1996, Ramone headlined the "Rock the Reservation" alternative rock festival in Tuba City, Arizona. "Joey Ramone & the Resistance" (Daniel Rey on guitar, John Connor on bass guitar and Roger Murdock on drums) debuted Ramone's interpretation of Louis Armstrong's "Wonderful World" live, as well as Ramone's choice of Ramones classics and some of his other favorite songs, such as the Dave Clark Five's "Any Way You Want It", the Who's "The Kids are Alright" and the Stooges' "No Fun".

Ramone co-wrote and recorded the song "Meatball Sandwich" with Youth Gone Mad. For a short time before his death, he took the role of manager and producer for the punk rock band the Independents.

His last recording as a vocalist was backup vocals on the album One Nation Under by Navajo punk band Blackfire. He appeared on two tracks, "What Do You See" and "Lying to Myself".

Ramone produced the Ronnie Spector EP She Talks to Rainbows in 1999. It was critically acclaimed but was not very commercially successful. The title track was previously on the Ramones' final studio album, ¡Adios Amigos!

== Vocal style ==
Ramone's signature cracks, hiccups, snarls, crooning, and youthful voice made him one of punk rock's most recognizable voices. Allmusic.com wrote that "Joey Ramone's signature bleat was the voice of punk rock in America." As his vocals matured and deepened through his career, so did the Ramones' songwriting, leaving a notable difference from his initial melodic and callow style – two notable tracks serving as examples are "Somebody Put Something in My Drink" and "Mama's Boy". Dee Dee Ramone was quoted as saying, "All the other singers [in New York] were copying David Johansen (of the New York Dolls), who was copying Mick Jagger... But Joey was unique, totally unique."

== Personal life ==
One of Hyman's favorite bands was Motörhead; he also liked AC/DC, the Georgia Satellites and the Dickies.

In the late 1970s, Hyman began dating Linda Marie Danielle, later known as Linda Ramone. They first met at CBGB in 1976, before meeting again a few years later in Los Angeles. The couple began dating and Linda would often travel with the Ramones during tours. They got engaged a couple years later. It is reported that Hyman and Linda had an argument about the engagement ring he bought her, and this fight is said to be the inspiration for the Ramones song "Merry Christmas (I Don't Want to Fight Tonight)". Linda and Hyman eventually split up after Linda began a relationship with Hyman's bandmate Johnny Ramone.

== Illness and death ==
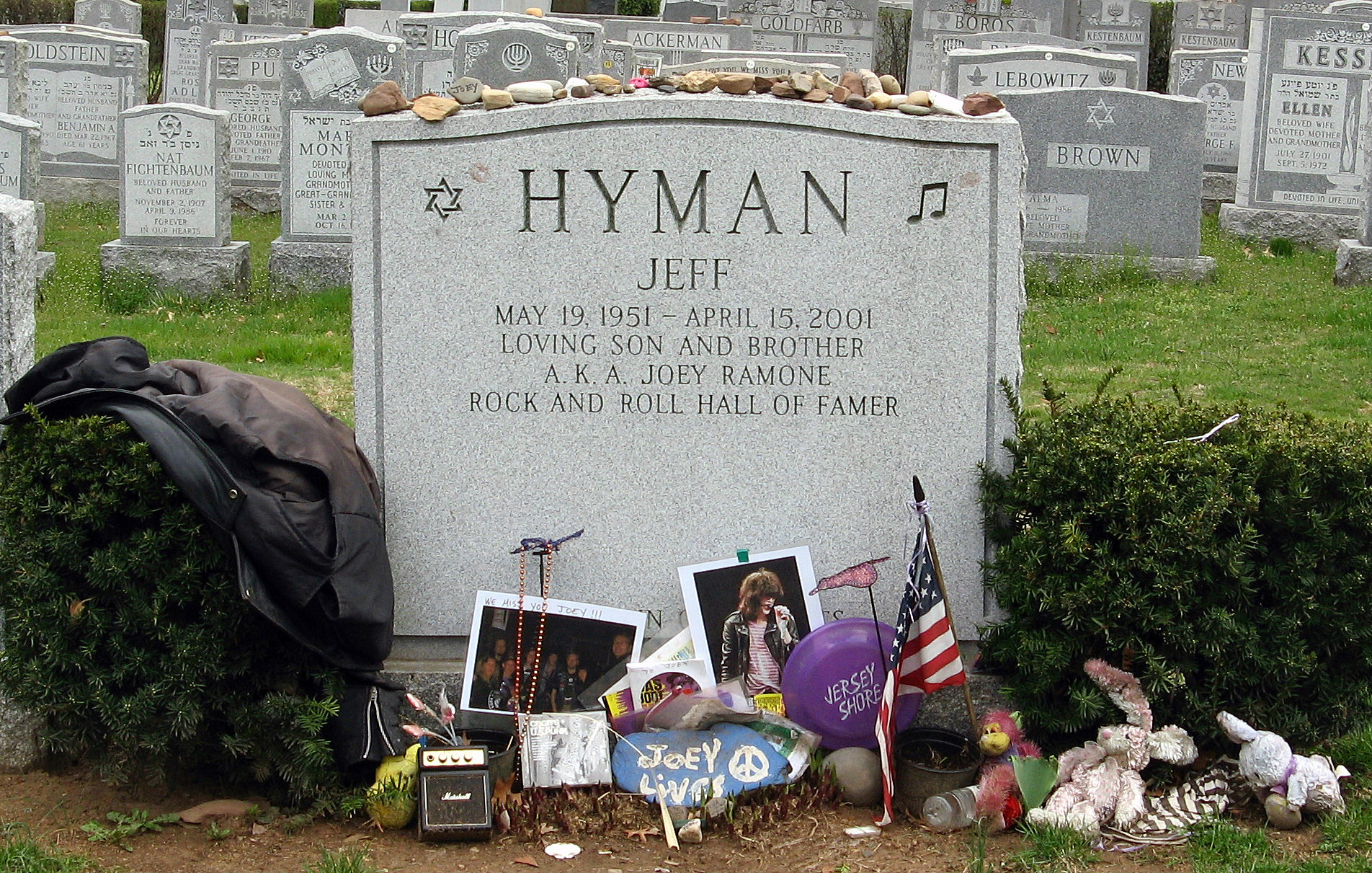
Headstone for Ramone with fan tributes

In 1994, Ramone was diagnosed with lymphoma. He kept his condition private until it was revealed on March 19, 2001, that he was battling the disease. In December 2000, Ramone had a fall that broke his hip and was hospitalized. His condition deteriorated after the fall. He died of the illness at New York-Presbyterian Hospital on April 15, 2001, aged 49. He was reportedly listening to the song "In a Little While" by U2 when he died. In an interview in 2014 for Radio 538, U2 lead singer Bono stated that Joey Ramone's family had told him this; later, Joey's friend Andy Shernoff (of the Dictators) also confirmed it. Joey's funeral was attended by former bandmates Tommy, Richie and C. J. Ramone, along with Debbie Harry and Chris Stein of Blondie, and Joan Jett. Joey is interred at New Mount Zion Cemetery in Lyndhurst, New Jersey.

In an obituary piece, MTV News said: "With his trademark rose-colored shades, black leather jacket, shoulder-length hair, ripped jeans and alternately snarling and crooning vocals, Joey was the iconic godfather of punk." MOJO wrote an obituary for Ramone and said: "[that he] came to be the supreme icon of punk rock is proof of how much one determined misfit can change the world".

His solo album Don't Worry About Me was released posthumously in 2002, and features the single "What a Wonderful World", a cover of the Louis Armstrong standard. The cover was also featured on the 2003 Freaky Friday soundtrack.

== Legacy ==
=== Continued popularity ===
Joey Ramone is regarded as one of the greatest influences in the history of punk music. In a commemorative 2001 article for PopMatters, Devon Powers writes that "he also popularised and solidified the blueprint of a musical form which broke rock and roll irreparably."

In 2022, Brookfield Asset Management acquired a majority stake in the music-publishing rights of Ramone for around US$10 million.

=== Tributes ===
On November 30, 2003, a block of East 2nd Street in New York City was officially renamed Joey Ramone Place. It is the block where Hyman once lived with bandmate Dee Dee Ramone and is near the former site of the music club CBGB, where the Ramones began their career. Hyman's birthday is celebrated annually during the "Joey Ramone Birthday Bash", hosted in New York City by his brother and, until 2007, his mother, Charlotte.

In September 2010, the Associated Press reported that the "Joey Ramone Place," road sign was New York City's most stolen sign. Later, the sign was moved to 20 ft (6.1 m) above ground level. Drummer Marky Ramone thought Joey would appreciate that his sign would be the most stolen, adding "Now you have to be an NBA player to see it."

In 2002 Tommy, C. J., and Marky Ramone and Daniel Rey recorded Jed Davis' Joey Ramone tribute album, The Bowery Electric.

=== Appearances in lists of influential people ===
The Ramones were named as inductees to the Rock and Roll Hall of Fame as part of the class of 2002.

After several years in development, Ramone's second posthumous album was released on May 22, 2012. Titled ...Ya Know?, it was preceded on Record Store Day by a 7" single re-release of "Blitzkrieg Bop"/"Havana Affair".

=== Portrayal in film and television ===
Joey Ramone was portrayed by Joel David Moore, as a supporting character, in the 2013 biographical film CBGB.

On April 15, 2021, the 20th anniversary of Ramone's death, it was announced that Pete Davidson would portray Ramone in the upcoming Netflix biopic, I Slept with Joey Ramone, based on the memoir of the same name written by Ramone's brother Mickey Leigh, an executive producer on the project, in collaboration with Ramone's estate. The treatment was written and developed by Davidson and director Jason Orley.

In late 2024, it was reported that the biopic project had stalled in response to a legal ruling that had come as the result of a lawsuit filed by Linda Ramone, Johnny Ramone's widow.

== Discography ==
=== With Ramones ===
- Ramones (1976)
- Leave Home (1977)
- Rocket to Russia (1977)
- Road to Ruin (1978)
- It's Alive (1979)
- End of the Century (1980)
- Pleasant Dreams (1981)
- Subterranean Jungle (1983)
- Too Tough to Die (1984)
- Animal Boy (1986)
- Halfway to Sanity (1987)
- Brain Drain (1989)
- Loco Live (1991)
- Mondo Bizarro (1992)
- Acid Eaters (1993)
- ¡Adios Amigos! (1995)

=== Solo ===
Album

- Don't Worry About Me (2002)
- ...Ya Know? (2012)

EP

- Christmas Spirit... In My House (2002)
  - Compilation featuring new track "Christmas (Baby Please Come Home)"

Singles

- "I Got You Babe" (1982) (Duet with Holly Beth Vincent) (standalone single)
- "Merry Christmas (I Don't Want to Fight Tonight) (Revised)" / "I Couldn't Sleep at All" (2001) (standalone single)
- "What a Wonderful World" (2002)
- "Rock and Roll Is the Answer" / "There's Got to Be More to Life" (2012)

Other appearances

- "The Wonderful Widow of Eighteen Springs" for Caged/Uncaged

=== With Sibling Rivalry ===
EP

- In a Family Way (1994)
