= Ross the Boss =

American guitarist (1954–2026)

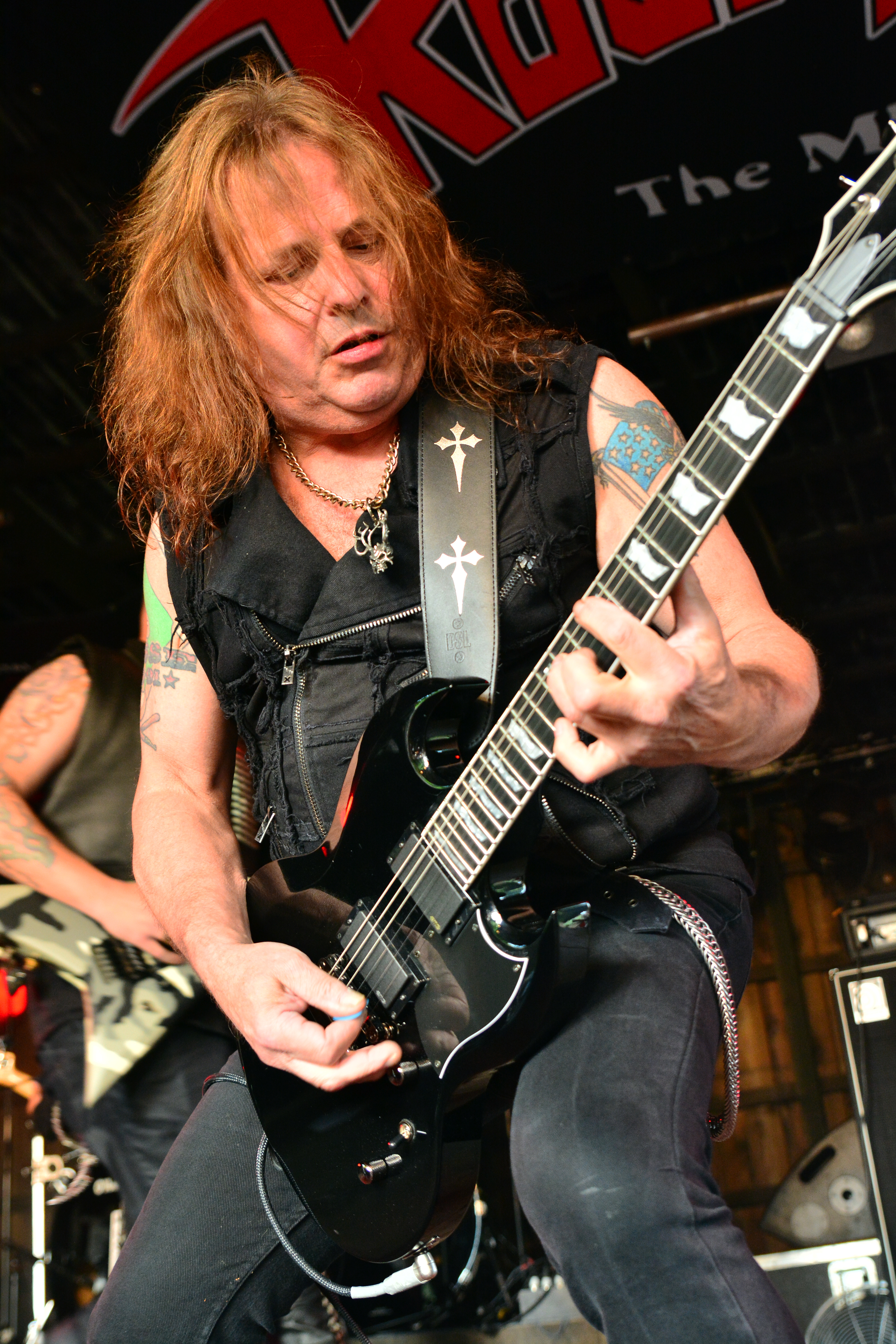
- Ross the Boss performing in 2015

Background information
- Born: Ross Friedman; January 3, 1954; The Bronx, New York, U.S.
- Died: March 26, 2026 (aged 72)
- Genres: Heavy metal; punk rock; proto punk
- Occupations: Musician; songwriter
- Instruments: Guitar; keyboards
- Years active: 1973–2026
- Formerly of: The Dictators; Shakin' Street; Manowar; Manitoba's Wild Kingdom; the Pack; Heyday; the Spinatras; Brain Surgeons; Ross the Boss; Death Dealer
- Website: ross-the-boss.com

Ross Friedman (January 3, 1954 – March 26, 2026), popularly known as Ross the Boss, was an American guitarist, noted for being a founding member of both the punk band the Dictators and the heavy metal group Manowar.

== Life and career ==
=== Early life ===
Friedman was born in the Bronx, New York, on January 3, 1954.

=== 1973–1988: the Dictators, Shakin' Street, and Manowar ===
He formed the punk rock band the Dictators with Andy Shernoff in 1973. After recording three albums with the group, Friedman moved to France in 1979 and played guitar in Fabienne Shine's band Shakin' Street until 1981, recording one album with them.

On Black Sabbath's 1980 Heaven and Hell tour, which was supported by Shakin' Street, Friedman was introduced to bass player Joey DeMaio. Later that year, the two formed the heavy metal band Manowar, with whom Friedman recorded six albums, before DeMaio asked him to leave in 1988.

=== 1989–2006: Manitoba's Wild Kingdom and other projects ===
In 1989, Friedman joined the Dictators spin-off band Manitoba's Wild Kingdom, which released one album the following year. He later formed the Pack, Heyday, and the Spinatras.

The Dictators resumed playing in 1995, and Friedman stayed with them until 2008, during which time they issued one studio album. In 2004, Friedman joined Brain Surgeons, with whom he recorded their last album, in 2006. The same year, he recorded Thunderboss with Dictators drummer J.P. "Thunderbolt" Patterson.

=== 2005–2026: Ross the Boss band and Death Dealer ===
In 2005, Friedman formed his own band, simply titled Ross the Boss, mostly consisting of members of the German cover band Men of War. They played classic Manowar tracks as well as new material. They released their debut album, New Metal Leader, in 2008, and followed it two years later with Hailstorm, which received 4.5 out of 5 stars on AllMusic.

In 2012, Friedman, together with Cage vocalist Sean Peck, Empires of Eden guitarist Stu Marshall, bassist Mike Davis, and Manowar drummer Kenny Earl "Rhino" Edwards, formed the metal supergroup Death Dealer. A year later, they released the album War Master, following up with Hallowed Ground (2015), Conquered Lands (2020), and Reign of Steel (2026).

On January 18, 2017, Friedman was inducted into the Metal Hall of Fame for his contributions to metal music while with Manowar.

=== Illness and death ===
On February 9, 2026, Friedman announced that he had been diagnosed with amyotrophic lateral sclerosis. He died of the disease a month later, on March 26, at the age of 72.

== Ross the Boss band ==
Final lineup

- Ross "The Boss" Friedman – guitar (2005–2026)
- Marc Lopes – lead vocals (2016–2026)
- Kenny "Rhino" Edwards – drums (2016–2017, 2024–2026)
- Dirk Schlächter – bass (2022–2026)

Past members

- Patrick Fuchs – lead vocals, guitar (2005–2011)
- Carsten Kettering – bass (2005–2011)
- Matze Mayer – drums (2005–2011)
- Mike Cotoia – vocals (2015–2016)
- Kevin Bolembach – bass (2015–2016)
- Lance Barnewold – drums (2015–2016, 2017–2018)
- Mike LePond – bass (2016–2022)
- Steve Bolognese – drums (2018–2024)

== Discography ==
=== As band member ===
with the Dictators

- The Dictators Go Girl Crazy! (1975)
- Manifest Destiny (1977)
- Bloodbrothers (1978)
- Fuck 'Em If They Can't Take a Joke (live, 1981)
- New York New York (live, 1999)
- DFFD (2001)
- ¡Viva Dictators! (live, 2005)
- Every Day Is Saturday (compilation, 2007)
- The Dictators (2024)

with Shakin' Street

- Shakin' Street (1980)
- Live and Raw (1989)
- Live (2004)
- 21st Century Love Channel (2009)

with Manowar

- Battle Hymns (1982)
- Into Glory Ride (1983)
- Hail to England (1984)
- Sign of the Hammer (1984)
- Fighting the World (1987)
- Kings of Metal (1988)

with Manitoba's Wild Kingdom

- ... And You? (1990)

with Heyday

- Heyday (1994)

with the Spinatras

- @Midnight.com (1999)

Thunderbolt Patterson with Ross the Boss

- Thunderboss (2004)

with Brain Surgeons

- Black Hearts of Soul (2004)
- Denial of Death (2006)

with Ross the Boss

- New Metal Leader (2008)
- Hailstorm (2010)
- By Blood Sworn (2018)
- Born of Fire (2020)
- Legacy of Blood, Fire & Steel (compilation, 2023)

with Death Dealer

- War Master (2013)
- Hallowed Ground (2015)
- Hallowed Ground (2015)
- Conquered Lands (2020)
- Reign of Steel (2026)

=== Contributions ===
David Roter Method

- Find Something Beautiful (1997)

The Thunderbolts

- The Thunderbolts (2006)

Burning Starr

- Land of the Dead (2011)

Bloody Times

- On a Mission (2019)
