= Brain Surgeons =

American rock band

- Origin: New York City, United States
- Genres: Heavy metal Hard rock
- Years active: 1994–2006
- Label: Cellsum
- Past members: Albert Bouchard; Deborah Frost; Ross the Boss; David Hirschberg; Peter Bohovesky; Billy Hilfiger

Brain Surgeons were an American rock band featuring Albert Bouchard formerly of Blue Öyster Cult and vocalist Deborah Frost. Guitarist Ross the Boss was a later member of the band.

They formed in 1994 and originally centered on the nucleus of Bouchard and Frost. In 1995, the lineup expanded to include Billy Hilfiger, Peter Bohovesky and David Hirschberg. Hilfiger was later diagnosed with brain cancer and died in 2001. Bohovesky left the band by 2003. In 2006, Brain Surgeons released their final studio album, Denial of Death, featuring Ross the Boss, and disbanded later that year.

== Former members ==
- Albert Bouchard − lead vocals, drums, guitar
- Deborah Frost − lead vocals, rhythm guitar
- David Hirschberg − bass guitar, vocals
- Peter Bohovesky − guitar, vocals
- Billy Hilfiger − guitar
- Ross the Boss − lead guitar

== Discography ==
- Eponymous (1994)
- Trepanation (1995)
- Box of Hammers (1996)
- Malpractise (1997)
- Piece of Work (double album, 1999)
- To Helen with Love (credited to Brain Surgeons & Friends) (2001)
- Beach Party (2003)
- Black Hearts of Soul (compilation, 2004)
- Denial of Death (2006)
