= Mondo New York =

- Directed by: Harvey Nikolai Keith
- Produced by: Stuart S. Shapiro
- Starring: Joey Arias; Rick Aviles; Charlie Barnett; Joe Coleman; Emilio Cubeiro; Karen Finley; Dean Johnson; Phoebe Legere; Lydia Lunch; Ann Magnuson; Frank Moore; John Sex
- Cinematography: Lenny Wong
- Edited by: Richard Friedman
- Music by: Johnny Pacheco
- Release date: 22 April 1988
- Running time: 82 minutes
- Country: United States
- Language: English

Mondo New York is a 1988 Mondo film directed by Harvey Nikolai Keith. The documentary film was inspired by the 1963 movie Mondo Cane.

== Overview ==
Mondo New York examines the lives and activities of Manhattan performance artists, and features Joey Arias and Rick Aviles. A number of New York City denizens appear in various sketches, each linked by a young woman's exploration of the city. Other performers include Charlie Barnett, Joe Coleman, Phoebe Legere, Karen Finley, Lydia Lunch, Veronica Vera, Frank Moore, and Ann Magnuson. The film was produced by Stuart S. Shapiro.

== Reception ==
Michael Wilmington of the Los Angeles Times stated ""Mondo New York" (Times- rated Adult for offensive language and repulsive situations) has some small value as an uncensored record of these highly regarded and controversial performance artists. But, mostly, it's a movie which expects us to react like the bored voyeurs eyeballing the geek while the blood spurts from his teeth." Jonathan Rosenbaum of Chicago Reader mentioned "Director Harvey Keith and producer Stuart Shapiro take a walk on the wild side through the seamier byways of New York life in this documentary inspired by the 1963 Mondo Cane. It features cockfights, junkies, street hookers, habitues of S and M clubs, and a number of outre performance artists—Ann Magnuson beating a dead horse, Karen Finley decorating herself with raw eggs and glitter, Joe Coleman biting the head off a mouse while nearly exploding himself with firecrackers, and Dean Johnson performing in drag with his band, the Weenies."

== See also ==
- Kusama: Infinity, a 2018 film.
