= Mickey Leigh =

Musical artist (born 1954)

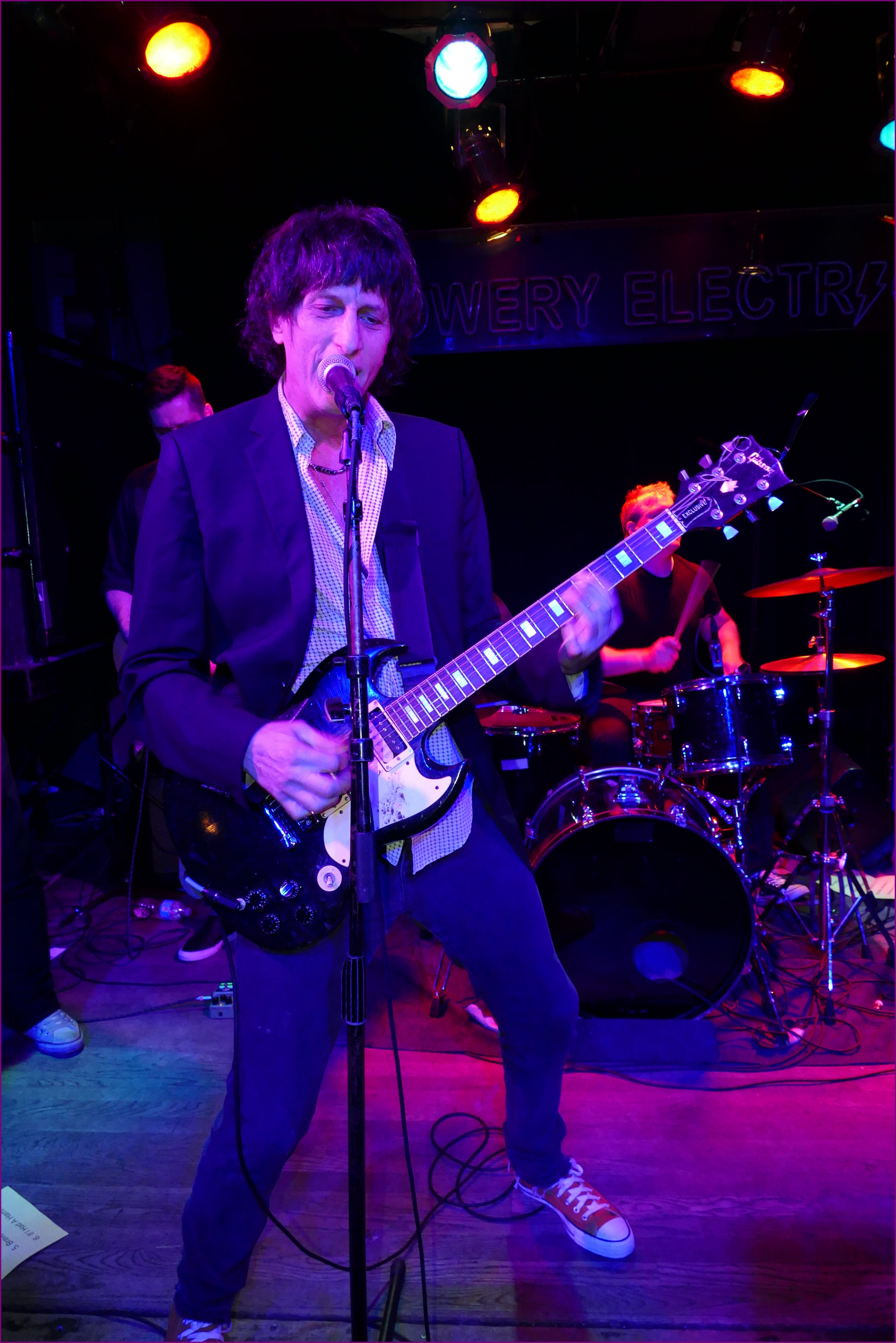
- Leigh in 2017

Background information
- Born: Mitchel Lee Hyman; July 15, 1954 (age 72); Forest Hills, New York, US
- Genre: Rock
- Occupations: Musician, singer-songwriter
- Instruments: Vocals, guitar, keyboards
- Years active: 1977–present
- Website: www.mickeyleigh.com

Mitchel Lee Hyman (born July 15, 1954), best known by his stage name Mickey Leigh, is an American musician and writer. He is the brother of Joey Ramone, lead vocalist of the punk rock band Ramones.

== Career ==
Mickey Leigh formed his first band at the age of 10. At the age of 14 Leigh was playing in a band with John Cummings (Johnny Ramone) and Tommy Erdelyi (Tommy Ramone). In 1977 he formed a band, Birdland, with music journalist Lester Bangs. The group recorded nine songs which were finally released in 1986, four years after Bangs' death, on the album Birdland with Lester Bangs. Creem magazine described it as “the best rock ‘n’ roll album of 1986."

Leigh's next band was The Rattlers. The group released two singles and one album in 1985. In 1994 he formed Sibling Rivalry with his brother Joey Ramone. Two years later Leigh recorded an album with his new band STOP. Leigh has also been working as producer for several New York based groups.

In 2009 Leigh published the book I Slept with Joey Ramone: A Family Memoir. On April 15, 2021, the 20th anniversary of Joey Ramone's death, plans were announced for a Netflix movie of Leigh's book, with Pete Davidson portraying Joey Ramone. According to the announcement, Leigh will serve as an executive producer and the film is being made with the full cooperation and support of Ramone’s estate, with a treatment written by Davidson and director Jason Orley.

Leigh's current project is Mickey Leigh's Mutated Music. In early 2022, they released a new album, Variants of Vibe, through Wicked Cool Records.

== Personal ==
Leigh claims to have "webbed toes."

=== Legal disputes ===
When Joey Ramone died in 2001, he left 50% of his shares of Ramones Productions Inc. to his mother, Charlotte Lesher. When Lesher died in 2007, she left those shares to Leigh, her surviving son. When Johnny Ramone died in 2004, his wife, Linda Ramone, became the executor of her husband's estate. In 2005, Linda Ramone and Mickey Leigh were appointed shareholders of Ramones Productions Inc.

In August 2024, Leigh sued Ramone for allegedly exploiting the Ramones legacy. Leigh also challenged Ramone the right to use her legal name, Linda Ramone.

After years of arbitration, in 2026, Linda Ramone became sole owner of Ramone Productions Inc.

=== Ramones biopic ===
In 2019, Ramone brought a suit against Leigh, claiming Leigh was allegedly developing a film without her approval. As per the Hollywood Reporter, the court ruled in Ramone's favor, citing that "the arbitrator subseqeuntly ruled that the proposal should have been brought before the company's board and required shareholder approval".

In 2021, Netflix announced it would stream a Ramones biopic, based on Leigh's memoir, I Slept With Joey Ramone, starring Pete Davidson, and directed by Jason Orley. Ramone filed suit in January 2024 against Leigh claiming he was "wrongfully developed a Ramones movie that he had initially presented as a Joey Ramone film". In March 2024, Leigh countersued, alleging that Ramone had signed off on future projects based on the book in 2006.

In December 2024, The Guardian reported that the arbitrator on the case deemed that former Ramones manager David Frey did not secure Ramone's approval for the adaptation of Leigh's memoir and posited that Frey's actions were a "breach of his 'duty of care, honest, and loyalty' by moving forward without consultation." Frey was ousted from the board in December 2024. In 2026, a judge upheld the decision, citing Leigh for not honoring his fiduciary duty as well.

In 2024, it was reported that the film would not be moving forward.

== Discography ==
BAND	TITLE	YEAR	CIT.
The Rattlers	"On the Beach" single	1979	
	"What Keeps Your Heart Beatin’?" single	1983	
	Rattled! LP	1985	
Birdland	Birdland with Lester Bangs LP	1986	
Sibling Rivalry	In a Family Way LP	1994	
STOP	Never LP	1996	
Mickey Leigh's Mutated Music	Mutated Music EP	2020	
	Variants of Vibe LP	2022	

== Bibliography ==
- Leigh, Mickey (2009). I Slept with Joey Ramone: A Family Memoir. Touchstone Books. ISBN 978-0-7432-5216-4.
