= Believer =

Believer(s) or The Believer(s) may refer to:

- A person who holds a particular belief

== Religion ==
- Believer, a person who holds a particular religious belief
  - Believers, Christians who adere to Christian beliefs
  - Mumin, or believers, a term in the Quran for Muslims
- Believers Church, a Pentecostal church
- Russian Old Believers, a sect who separated from the Russian Orthodox Church as a protest against church reforms introduced by Patriarch Nikon between 1652 and 1666

== Arts and media ==
=== Film ===
- The Believers (film), a 1987 neo-noir film by John Schlesinger
- The Believers: Stories from Jewish Havana, a 1994 American documentary short film
- The Believer (2001 film), a film directed by Henry Bean
- Believers (film), a 2007 film directed by Daniel Myrick
- Believer (2018 American film), a HBO LGBT documentary by Don Argott
- Believer (2018 South Korean film), a film by Lee Hae-young
- The Believer (2021 film), an American horror film
- The Exorcist: Believer, a 2023 American horror film

=== Television ===
- Believer (TV series), a 2017 CNN documentary series presented by Reza Aslan
- The Believers (TV series), a 2024 Thai crime drama series
- "Believers" (Babylon 5), a television episode
- "The Believer" (Grimm), a television episode
- "Chapter 15: The Believer", an episode of The Mandalorian

=== Literature ===
- Believers (manga), a manga by Naoki Yamamoto
- The Believer (magazine), a literary magazine
- The Believers (comics), an Indian graphic novel
- The Believers (novel), a 2008 novel by Zoë Heller
- "Al-Mu'minoon" ("The Believers"), twenty-third sura (chapter) of the Qur'an
- The Believers, a 1957 novel by Janice Holt Giles
- The Believers, a 1982 novel by Nicholas Condé
- Believer, a 1993 poem by He Xuntian

=== Music ===
- Believer (band), a Christian thrash metal band

==== Albums ====
- Believer (Chic album) or the title song, 1984
- Believer (Laura Dawn album) or the title song, 1999
- Believer (Kutless album) or the title song, 2012
- Believer (Oteil and the Peacemakers album), 2005
- Believer (Smerz album), 2021
- Believer, album by Emily Maguire (singer), 2009
- The Believer (John Coltrane album) or the title song, 1964
- The Believer (Rhett Miller album) or the title song, 2006
- Believers (A. A. Bondy album), 2011
- Believers (Deacon Blue album) or the title song, 2016
- Believers (Don McLean album) or the title song, 1981
- Believers (¡Mayday! album) or the title song, 2013

==== Songs ====
- "Believer" (American Authors song), 2013
- "Believer" (DJ Fresh and Adam F song), 2015
- "Believer" (Goldfrapp song), 2010
- "Believer" (Major Lazer and Showtek song), 2016
- "Believer" (Imagine Dragons song), 2017
- "Believers" (Joe Nichols song), 2009
- "Believers" (Alan Walker song), 2021
- "Believer", by 3 Doors Down from Time of My Life, 2011
- "Believer", by Aṣa from V, 2022
- "Believer", by Atomic Kitten from Ladies Night, 2003
- "Believer", by Audio Adrenaline from Kings & Queens, 2013
- "Believer", by Bizarre from Friday Night at St. Andrews, 2010
- "Believer", by BT from the soundtrack of the film Go, 1999
- "Believer", by DJ Muggs from Dust, 2003
- "Believer", by Freemasons, 2010
- "Believer", by Guy Sebastian from T.R.U.T.H., 2020
- "Believer", by Keyshia Cole from Point of No Return, 2014
- "Believer", by Kill Hannah from Until There's Nothing Left of Us, 2006
- "Believer", by Marla Glen, 1993
- "Believer", by Noiseworks, B-side of "Freedom", 1990
- "Believer", by Ozzy Osbourne from Diary of a Madman, 1981
- "Believer", by the Real People, 1992
- "Believer", by Rogue Traders from Here Come the Drums, 2005
- "Believer", by Supergrass, B-side of "Moving", 1999
- "Believer", by Susanna and the Magical Orchestra from List of Lights and Buoys, 2004
- "Believer", by Twice from Eyes Wide Open, 2020
- "Believer", by ¥$ from the deluxe of Vultures 2, 2024
- "Believer: Tabidachi No Uta", by Mikuni Shimokawa, 1999
- "The Believer", by Common from The Dreamer/The Believer, 2011
- "The Believer", by the Luka State, 2015
- "The Believer", by Neil Young from Chrome Dreams II, 2007
- "The Believers", by How to Destroy Angels from How to Destroy Angels, 2010

== See also ==
- Non-believer
- Belief (disambiguation)
- Believe (disambiguation)
- I Believe (disambiguation)
- True believer (disambiguation)
- Unbeliever (disambiguation)
