= Phantomville =

Phantomville is a graphic novel company set up by writer/artist Sarnath Banerjee and Anindya Roy. Its aim is to provide a platform for Indian writers and artists to produce mature graphic novels.

== Related works ==
- Corridor
- The Barn Owl's Wondrous Capers
- The Believers
- Kashmir Pending
- Upcoming untitled graphic novel about Dhyan Chand

== See also ==
- Indian comics
