= We Believe =

We Believe may refer to:

- We Believe (album), live album by Brian & Jenn Johnson
- We Believe (commercial)", a television commercial by Gillette
- "We Believe" (Newsboys song), a Christian worship song by the Newsboys, 2013
- "We Believe", a song by Good Charlotte from their 2004 album The Chronicles of Life and Death
- "We Believe", a song by Ministry from their 1986 album Twitch
- "We Believe", a song by Red Hot Chili Peppers from their 2006 album Stadium Arcadium
- "We Believe", a song by Queen + Paul Rodgers from their 2008 album The Cosmos Rocks
- We Believe, slogan for the 2006–07 Golden State Warriors season
- We Believe (yard sign), originally Kindness is Everything

== See also ==
- "Because We Believe (Ama Credi E Vai)", a song by Italian pop tenor Andrea Bocelli
- Still, We Believe: The Boston Red Sox Movie, 2004 documentary film documenting the Boston Red Sox' 2003 season and the team's relationship with its fans directed by Paul Doyle Jr.
- We Believe: Chicago and Its Cubs, 2009 documentary film about Chicago and the Chicago Cubs directed by John Scheinfeld
- "We Believe in Happy Endings", song written by Bob McDill and recorded by American country music artist Johnny Rodriguez
- Believe (disambiguation)
