= The Harappa Files =

2011 graphic novel by Sarnath Banerjee

- First edition
- Author: Sarnath Banerjee
- Illustrator: Sarnath Banerjee
- Language: English
- Genre: Graphic novel
- Publisher: HarperCollins (India)
- Publication date: 2011
- Publication place: India
- Pages: 215 pp
- ISBN: 978-93-5029-031-6

The Harappa files is a 2011 graphic novel by Indian graphic artist Sarnath Banerjee. It is the author's third graphic novel after Corridor and The Barn Owl's Wondrous Capers. The book is introduced as a set of "loosely bound graphic commentaries" produced in a period of three years.

== Plot ==
The Greater Harappa Rehabilitation, Reclamation & Redevelopment Commission (GHRRR) is a secret committee of elite bureaucrats, historians, ethnographers, social scientists, law enforcers, retired diplomats and policymakers. The committee has had the responsibility of conducting a survey of the "current ethnography and urban mythologies of a country on the brink of great hormonal changes." The author Sarnath Banerjee is assigned by the committee to disseminate information about the findings. However, Banerjee is afraid that the Harappa Recommendations will eventually make it mandatory for all the citizens to sign a draconian form "28b".

== Selected "files" ==
The files are fragmentary narratives dealing with commonplace cultural artifacts from a post-liberalized India.

"Nano" talks about two friends, Vipin Mathur and Naman Doshi, who have known each other since childhood but are unable to meet because neither dares to cross the road. It dreams up a Delhi saturated with so many cars that pedestrians "can finally cross the road" when the jam ceases to move. It goes on to discuss Jaguar's acquisition by Tata Motors.

"The Dept of Surplus Emotion", written in collaboration with Samit Basu, equates bureaucrats to gargoyles and pays attention to the essential tools of the Indian bureaucracy: the Mystic Stone Paperweight, the Hermes Supersonic Pen, the Triangular Bermuda file, the Kumar Bros. Tiffin Carrier.

"Jessie" talks about Jagadish Chandra Bose, who in 1904, received patents for making microwave receivers to detect radio waves. But the news of Bose's discovery reached late due to bureaucratic delays and Banerjee stipulates this might have costed India a Nobel Prize.

"Nehru's Children" talks about the over-reliance on remote, obscure General Knowledge and ends with a pastiche of the ubiquitous I.I.T. Tuition Classes' posters.

"Boroline", "Calomine X", 'Lifebuoy, Bullworker, VICCO, discuss the signs and significations of the products and their advertisements.

"Rakhaldas Banerjee's Plot" is a story of Girish, the psychic plumber, and tangentially, Rakhaldas Bandyopadhyay, the man credited with discovering Mohenjo-daro.

"Tea" places the text of an apocryphal tale about Bodhidharma's life with the images of a tea auction.

"Single Malt, Single Woman" discusses how after a threesome there is disappointment since "it is now one fantasy less."
