= The Dawn of Battle =

EP by Manowar
- Released: 2002
- Genre: Heavy metal, power metal
- Length: 16:24
- Label: Nuclear Blast

Manowar chronology
Warriors of the World (2002)	The Dawn of Battle (2002)	The Sons of Odin (2006)

The Dawn of Battle is a three-song EP by heavy metal band Manowar, released in 2002 on the Nuclear Blast label.

This peculiar disc is a CD on one side and a DVD on the other side; the outer (unused) region of each side is painted black like a regular CD or DVD back side.

The EP also contains some video material from Ringfest, a promotional trailer for the Fire and Blood DVD, and a link to a special website.

To promote the EP, a promotional music video was made for the song "I Believe".

"The Dawn of Battle" was featured in the 2009 video game Brütal Legend.

== Track listing ==
No.	Title	Length
1.	"The Dawn of Battle"	6:49
2.	"I Believe"	4:05
3.	"Call to Arms"	5:30
