= Belief (disambiguation) =

Belief is a psychological state in which an individual holds a proposition or premise to be true.

Belief may also refer to:

== In general ==
- Religious belief, a belief regarding the supernatural, sacred, or divine
  - Belief in God
- Belief (sociology), an element of performance, in Erving Goffman's dramaturgical sociology

== Music ==
- Belief (band), a Los Angeles-based duo

=== Albums ===
- Belief (Nitzer Ebb album), a 1989 album by Nitzer Ebb
- Belief (Belief album), a 2022 album by Belief
- Belief, a 1996 album by Leon Parker

=== Songs ===
- "Belief" (song), a 2006 song by John Mayer
- "Belief", a song by Gavin DeGraw from his 2003 album Chariot
- "Belief", a song by Neurosis from their 1999 album Times of Grace
- "Beliefs", a song by We Came as Romans from their 2009 album To Plant a Seed

== Other uses ==
- "Belief" (short story), a story by Isaac Asimov from the collection Through a Glass, Clearly
- Belief (TV series), a documentary series hosted by Oprah Winfrey

== See also ==
- List of belief systems
- Believe (disambiguation)
- Believer (disambiguation)
- I Believe (disambiguation)
- Belief bias
- False belief
- Non-belief
- Faith
- Opinion
- Trust (social sciences), reliance on another person or entity
