= Fire and Blood =

Fire and Blood may refer to:

- Fire and Blood: A History of Mexico, a 1973 book by T. R. Fehrenbach
- Fire and Blood (Manowar DVD), a 1998 music DVD by Manowar
- Fire and Blood (Daugherty), a 2003 composition for solo violin and orchestra by Michael Daugherty
- "Fire and Blood" (Game of Thrones), a 2011 episode of Game of Thrones
- "Fire and Blood" (song), a song by Ramin Djawadi for the soundtrack of Game of Thrones
- Fire & Blood (novel), a book by George R. R. Martin about the history of House Targaryen
- "Fire and Blood", the motto of House Targaryen in George R. R. Martin's A Song of Ice and Fire series
- Fire & Blood, a 2023 album by Jus Allah
- Fire and Blood (novella), a 1925 novella by Ernst Jünger

== See also ==
- Blood and Fire (disambiguation)
