= History of the Jews in Cuba =

The history of the Jews in Cuba possibly begins in 1492 from Spain to the island with the first expedition of Christopher Columbus to the Americas. Jewish Cubans, Cuban Jews, or Cubans of Jewish heritage, have lived in the nation of Cuba for centuries. Some Cubans trace Jewish ancestry to Marranos (forced converts to Christianity) who came as colonists, though few of these practice Judaism today. The majority of Cuban Jews are descended from European Jews who immigrated in the early 20th century. More than 24,000 Jews lived in Cuba in 1924 and still more immigrated to the country in the 1930s. Following the 1959 communist revolution, 94% of the country's Jews emigrated, most of them to the United States. In 2007 an estimated 1,500 known Jewish Cubans remained in the country, overwhelmingly located in Havana. Several hundred have since immigrated to Israel. Considered one of the most important Latin American Jewish sites, Beth Shalom Temple is the epicenter for current Jewish life in Cuba and still conducts weekly Shabbat services.

In addition to the descendants of Cuban Jews living in the United States, there is also a significant population which claims descent from non-Cuban Jews and from Cuban gentiles.

== Before the Cuban Revolution ==
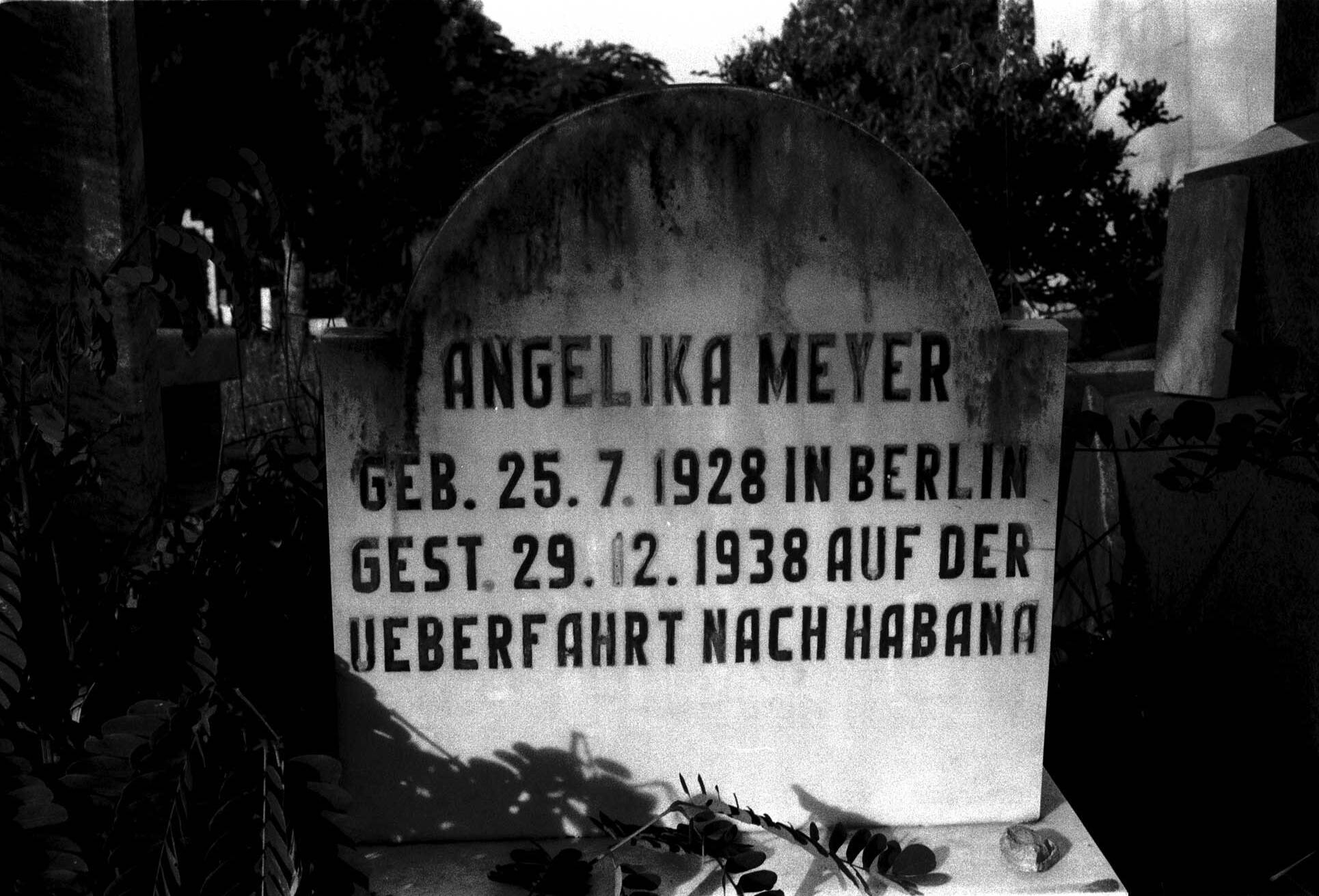
Grave of a Jewish girl at the Jewish Cemetery of Havana

Cuban Jewish history possibly begins in 1492 with the arrival of the first expedition of Christopher Columbus to the Americas. Columbus was accompanied on that seminal voyage by interpreter Luis de Torres, who may have been a Spanish Jewish converso and possibly the first Jewish person in the Americas. Some Jews fleeing Portuguese-ruled Brazil in the 17th century settled in Cuba and despite inquisitions and persecutions, Jewish merchants based in Cuba engaged in flourishing international trade in the 17th and 18th centuries. However, the contemporary Jewish community does not represent a line of continuity with Jews who settled in Cuba in the 17th and 18th centuries. It began to form after Cuba gained independence from Spain following the Spanish–American War of 1898. At the end of the 19th century, American Jewish businessmen and war veterans began to settle on the island. They engaged in import and export as well as sugar and tobacco farming. In 1904, they founded Union Hebrew Congregation and in 1906 a Jewish cemetery was established. In the early 20th century, Sephardi Jewish immigrants from the Ottoman Empire began to arrive and in 1914, they established their own community organization, Union Hebrea Shevet Achim. Most of the Sephardi immigrants arrived poor and turned to peddling or managed to build small businesses.

In 1920, Jewish immigrants from Eastern Europe began arriving. By 1924 there were 24,000 Jews in Cuba, with many working in its garment industry. For most Jewish immigrants from Eastern Europe, Cuba was merely a transit point on their way to the United States. Most of those who arrived between 1920 and 1923 had left by 1925. However, the passage of the Immigration Act of 1924, which severely curtailed Jewish immigration to the United States, left thousands of Jewish immigrants now unable to proceed to the United States, and as a result they settled permanently in Cuba, a good deal residing in Parque Central, Havana. Throughout the rest of the 1920s and 1930s, thousands of Jewish immigrants continued to enter Cuba from Europe, largely as a result of Nazi and fascist persecution (see also MS St. Louis). The Jewish immigrants from Europe came during an economic downturn and found it difficult to integrate into a country lacking industry and inundated with cheap labor from Haiti and many turned to peddling to make ends meet. Jewish refugees from Antwerp introduced the diamond polishing industry to Cuba during World War II, establishing 24 plants in one year. With the growth of the Jewish community, various Jewish communal organizations emerged. The main communal body of the Eastern European Jewish immigrants was the Centro Israelita, and during the 1920s it came to offer a range of activities and services from welfare assistance, a clinic, a library, a language school, a student center, and a drama club. The Cuban Jewish community split into three sectors: Americans, Sephardim, and Ashkenazim, each with its own cemetery and communal activities. The Jews' economic situation gradually improved and by 1959 the Jewish working class had nearly disappeared.

== After the Cuban Revolution ==
In the aftermath of the revolution, nearly 95% of the Jewish population left Cuba for the United States, many settling in Miami. By September 1960, as many as 3,000 Jews had already departed Cuba and approximately 1,500 remained by 1997. Additionally, between the years 1948 and 1997, 661 Cuban Jews immigrated to Israel and in 1999 another 400 Cuban Jews departed for Israel as well.

Many Jews were initially sympathetic to the Cuban Revolution of 1959 under Fidel Castro, seeing the change in leadership as an opportunity to rid Cuba of the corruption that was associated with the dictatorship of Fulgencio Batista. In the early stages of the revolution, it was not evident that Castro's plans were to ally Cuba with the communist bloc. As Castro's plans became clear, Jewish Cubans who had emigrated from Eastern and Central Europe became increasingly concerned with the impending revolution, as a result of their prior experience with religious intolerance associated with Leninist policies and Bolshevik Russia. During the earliest days of the revolution, the most paramount concern for the Jewish Cuban population was the nationalization of industry and agriculture and the laws which supported it. These measures include the first and second Agrarian Reform Laws, Law 851, and the First Urban Reform Law. The Agrarian Reform Laws of 1959 and 1963 caused strife amongst Jewish landowners and farmers, as the government began eradicating all landed estates and foreign-owned land, in addition to nationalizing all properties and buildings exceeding 67 hectares. Law 851 sparked the nationalization of business and industry within Cuba, beginning with foreign-owned businesses. It entailed the expropriation of Cuban property, not owned by leaders of a previous government, for the first time in Cuba's history. This ranged from large to medium sized businesses, including distilleries, factories, and department stores. Finally, the First Urban Reform Law stripped Jews of their property rental business by turning ownership to tenants and creating longterm rent-free leases. This law also made it illegal to privately rent or sublet properties.

Measures such as the second Urban reform law permitted the Cuban government to seize the property and assets of those who immigrated to the island. In a 2011 survey of Jews living in Cuba, one respondent described the experience of religious Jews during the socio-political environment of the post-Revolutionary period: "People were not persecuted because they practiced religion, but if you wanted to be a member of the Communist Party, or go to university, it was necessary not to be a believer. The same happened to Catholics and to those of other faiths." The language used to describe Jews included, "Judio" for children who were not baptized, "Turquista", and "Polaco" or "Polaquito" which were synonymous with Jew, regardless of their country of origin. Lastly, during their emigration from Cuba to Israel, Jews were marked as "repatriado" (repatriated) on their passport rather than "gusanos" (worms) as an emigration distinction. This was meant to indicate that those Jews departing for Israel to be "repatriated to their home country", though few Jews who immigrated to Cuba were actually Israeli.

In 1959, the government declared that the revolution would be a socialist movement and that Cuba would become an atheist state. This shunning of religion helped shaped the religious identity of Jews who remained in Cuba, as well as the exiles who immigrated to the United States, Israel, and other areas throughout North, South, and Central America. The Jewish Cuban identity was morphed by a variety of revolutionary influences, but particularly the bias against those who practiced faith. Those who remained in Cuba either shied away from participation in the revolution or chose to abandon their Jewish identity altogether in order to do the opposite. Up until 1992 when Cuba had adjusted its constitution to reflect that the country was no longer an atheist state but rather secular or "la apertura", Jews had largely discarded their uniquely Jewish practices and abandoned community gathering at places such as El Patrono community center and Chevet Ahim synagogue. For many Cuban Jews, eating Matzo, an unleavened bread eaten during the celebration of Passover, was the only practice they had maintained.

Three of the ten original members of the Cuban Communist Party were Jewish including Fabio Grobart, Manuel (Stolik) Novigrod, and Enrique Oltuski. Fabio Grobart, whose original name was Abraham Simchowitz, immigrated from Poland to Cuba at the age of 19 and brought along with him knowledge of the radical leftist movements from Eastern Europe. He joined the Cuban Communist Party in 1925 and was one of Castro's closest constituents as a member of the party's Central Committee. He represented the party in communist ideology, as he had the ability to translate the readings of Karl Marx and Frederick Engels from Russian and German to Spanish. Manuel (Stolik) Novigrod was born into a family of Jewish communists and fought directly alongside Castro against Bautista's forces in the Sierra Maestra Mountains. One year after his parents' immigration from Poland, Enrique Oltuski was born in Cuba in 1930. His collaboration with Ernesto "Che" Guevara while representing Las Villas as its leader of the 26th of July Movement enabled him to ascend to highest-ranking Jew in the revolutionary government. Following the revolution, Oltuski was relied on, acting as the vice minister of the fishing industry, as well as working with the Ministry of Culture in order to maintain a historical account of the revolution.

In February 2007 The New York Times estimated that there were about 1,500 known Jews living in Cuba, most of them (about 1,100) living in Havana. Cuba has one kosher butcher shop on the entire island. For a time it had no rabbi, but by 2007, one was based in a Havana synagogue. He often encourages visiting Jewish peoples to give tzedakah (charity) for the Jewish Cubans and for Israel. Alan Gross traveled to Cuba to help the small Jewish community, but he was detained in Cuba from 2009 to 2014. Some Jewish Americans originally from Cuba are also fierce critics of the Cuban government, such as former Representative Ileana Ros-Lehtinen. Israel also continues to have an embargo against Cuba.

Adath Israel is the only nominally Orthodox synagogue remaining in Cuba. There are two other synagogues in Havana, in addition to a few other Cuban cities. In December 2006, the Cuban Jewish community celebrated its 100th anniversary.

== Cuban Jews in the United States ==
Because South Florida and New York City have large Jewish and Cuban populations, a significant number of people in these areas claim descent from American Jews and Cuban-Americans, usually Catholic non-Jews. Americans of Jewish and Cuban descent (whether or not their ancestors were Cuban Jews specifically) sometimes refer to themselves as Jubans (or Jewbans or Jewbanos), a portmanteau of the words "Jew" and "Cuban".

In 1999, actor and playwright Frank Speiser debuted his one-man play Jewbano about growing up Jewish and Cuban in Brooklyn.

Although primarily used in a positive sense, the term "Jewban" has sometimes been misinterpreted as an antisemitic political statement (i.e., advocating a "ban" on Jews). In 2003 the Florida Department of Highway Safety and Motor Vehicles attempted to withdraw a "JEWBAN" vanity plate which had previously been issued to Tabares Gomer, a Jewish Cuban, arguing that the plate could be considered antisemitic. The department later relented and permitted Gomer to keep the license plate.

== See also ==
- Cuba–Israel relations
- The Believers: Stories from Jewish Havana
- Abraham and Eugenia: Stories from Jewish Cuba
- B'nai B'rith Cuba
