= Blood and Fire =

Blood and Fire may refer to:

- "Blood and Fire" (Star Trek: The Next Generation), an unproduced script by David Gerrold for Star Trek: The Next Generation
- Blood and Fire (record label), a British reggae label
- Blood and Fire (film), a 1945 Swedish film
- Blood and Fire (album), an album by the Eighties Matchbox B-Line Disaster
- "Blood and Fire", a song by the Indigo Girls from Strange Fire
- "Blood & Fire", a song by Niney the Observer
- "Blood & Fire", a song by Type O Negative from Bloody Kisses
- "Blood and Fire", the war cry of The Salvation Army
- Blood & Fire, the second entry in the Giovanni Chronicles series of tabletop game books

== See also ==
- Fire and Blood (disambiguation)
