= Abraham and Eugenia: Stories from Jewish Cuba =

1994 film

Abraham and Eugenia: Stories From Jewish Cuba
- Directed by: Bonnie Burt
- Release date: 1994
- Country: United States
- Languages: English, Spanish (with English subtitles)

Abraham and Eugenia: Stories From Jewish Cuba is a 1994 documentary directed by American Bonnie Burt.

== Summary ==
Abraham and Eugenia: Stories From Jewish Cuba tells the story of two people living on the communist island nation who have held onto their faith in the years since the revolution.

Abraham, a Jewish-Cuban and the only kosher butcher left in Havana, expresses the intensity of pressure to integrate into the society. He acknowledges that there is a lack of anti-Semitism, which makes it easier to get along. But Abraham is concerned that without working at it, the younger generation will live "as an average Cuban" and fail to carry on Jewish traditions.

Soon after Castro took power in 1959 up until the early 1990s, 94% of the Jewish population left Cuba. Before then, there had been 15,000 Jews in Havana alone. Shortly after the fall of the USSR, the communist party of Cuba announced a relaxation of some of their principles and the toleration of religion. But with the fall of the Soviet Union, aid to Cuba was stopped and people suffered material shortages: in 1994 Bonnie Burt traveled to Cuba and found there was a lack of medication, power outages are an everyday occurrence, and groceries per-household are extensively limited throughout the island. Within these conditions, she filmed Abraham and Eugenia, and a revival of Judaism in Cuba.

Burt shows Abraham preparing for his son Yacob's Bar Mitzvah. It is the first such event in Havana in over 15 years. At the service Abraham notes that their congregation has not had a rabbi in about 30 years, but they have been able to persevere.

In the rural, undeveloped area of Cuba's inland, Burt introduces Eugenia and her sister. They were raised in the same countryside that developed the radical leaders of the Cuban Revolution. Eugenia and her sister wanted to respect their religious father's desire that they wed men only of the Jewish faith, but found it impossible to find mates when most of the remaining Jews lived in Havana. By the time the women reached their 30s, they decided to marry Gentiles rather than remain single forever. With her husband's understanding, Eugenia was rearing their children as Jews.

The Jewish population is at a significantly low level; the pious societies of Camagüey, Cienfuegos and Santiago stand at fewer than 100 Jews per town. They lack synagogues to congregate and worship in. To strengthen Jewish living and retain a quorum of Jewish men, more people are considered necessary.

The documentary notes that Cuba's Jews had been from both Sephardic and Ashkenazy traditions, coming from Turkey, Poland, Germany and other parts of Europe, with most immigrants having arrived. With the liberalization of policies in the 1990s in Cuba, they hoped to attract new immigrants.

== Reception ==
Paul Kaplan of Library Journal described Abraham and Eugenia: Stories from Jewish Cuba as "a very thoughtful film, easy to view with its large English subtitles. It is recommended for school and public libraries that emphasize Jewish, Latin American, or ethnic studies."

== See also ==
- The Believers: Stories from Jewish Havana
- History of the Jews in Cuba
