= Popkomm =

Former international trade show for music and entertainment in Germany

Popkomm was an international trade show for the music and entertainment business during the 1990s and 2000s, and also integrated a congress and festival. It was held in Cologne for most of its existence, later moved to Berlin with entries from at least 55 other countries.

== History ==
Popkomm first took place in Düsseldorf in 1989, and at the time was a meeting place of little-known independent musicians. In 1990 Popkomm moved to Cologne, and had already become an international meeting place of the industry. Cologne hosted the show until 2003 when then relocated to Berlin in 2004. In Berlin the event developed into one of the three biggest international music b2b events, until the organizing Popkomm GmbH postponed the event in 2009 for one year due to reclining revenues. In 2010, Popkomm was reactivated as part of the umbrella brand Berlin Music Week and took place at the Berlin Tempelhof Airport. The final event was in 2011, after which it was shut down.

== The congress ==
The Popkomm Congress was an event where important industry issues were discussed, new developments were introduced and information was presented by international representatives of the business. For trade visitors there were panels with prominent figures and keynote speakers from the highest tiers of the music business. Figures such as Feargal Sharkey, former lead singer of the Undertones and chairman of the UK’s Live Music Forum, Gilberto Gil, world-famous musician and Minister of Culture of Popkomm’s partner country Brazil, Claude Nobs, founder of the legendary Montreux Jazz Festival, and boy group impresario Lou Pearlman were all present at Popkomm 2006.

In 2007 the main topics were digital music, live music, mobile entertainment and the creative industries. In addition to highlighting these issues Popkomm also organised attractions by country, for example in 2006 the focus was on Japan, Brazil and Russia.

In 2010, the congress took place at the airport Tempelhof and was organized by a2n, all together now.

== The marketplace ==
For people in the business Popkomm was a significant trade show, which gave the industry a strong economic boost and in terms of cultural politics exerted an important influence. For years numerous labels, majors and indies, distributors, publishers and enterprises close to the music industry have been represented at Popkomm. With a display area covering 16000 square metres, a total of 817 exhibitors, 589 of whom were from 55 countries outside Germany, attendance far in excess of 15000 trade visitors, Popkomm 2006 broke all previous records. However, over the years it has not only been the number of exhibitors, the total of countries represented, and visitor attendance which have been rising, but also the volume of successful talks and deals taking place at this trade fair. Following Popkomm 2006, 72 per cent of exhibitors and 41 per cent of trade visitors reported concluding successful business. In 2010, for the first time in its history Popkomm introduced a B2C marketplace reaching out to the end consumer.

== The festival ==
In addition to the trade show and the congress the third element of Popkomm’s threefold concept was a festival. In 2006 Popkomm organised stage performances by over 2000 musicians from 26 countries, over 400 acts performed more than 600 hours of live music at 30 clubs in Berlin, in front of audiences totalling 70000. Among the big names in 2006 were Billy Talent, Chicks on Speed, Joy Denalane, Kaizers Orchestra, ¡Forward, Russia!, the Aggrolites, the Long Blondes, Sugarplum Fairy, Juliette and the Licks and Lunik.

== Popkomm IMEA: the awards ==
Popkomm IMEA stands for the ”Innovation in Music and Entertainment Awards“, these were presented in recognition of innovative business ideas by people in the music industry with a focus on young enterprises who are making a name for themselves with, for instance, creative ideas on digital music marketing or mobile entertainment.

== Popkomm Classics ==
Classical music is popular and the market for classical music is growing noticeably. Popkomm tapped into this trend years ago and made Popkomm Classics a successful part of its concept. Labels, associations, publishers and classical music media were represented at the Classic Lounge, a place where they could showcase new and innovative trends of the classical music market, and where they could promote an exchange of views by meeting interesting people and holding constructive talks in a relaxed atmosphere. Classical music was also an integral part of the Popkomm Congress. In 2006 the panels discussed innovative educational programmes and the power of classical music. In 2006 "ReComposed by Jimi Tenor“ celebrated a world premiere at Berlin's Deutsche Oper.

== See also ==
- Musikfest am Ring
- c/o pop
- Eastern Europe Music Convention (EEMC)
- Eurosonic
- Jazzahead
- Midem
- Musikmesse Frankfurt
- NAMM Show
- Promikon
- Reeperbahn Festival
- South by Southwest
- Winter Music Conference
- World Music Expo (WOMEX)

== Other music fairs ==
- Eurosonic in Groningen, the Netherlands
- MIDEM in Cannes, France
- South by Southwest (SXSW) in Austin, Texas, USA
- WOMEX - the world music expo made in Berlin - travels through Europe
