= Kashmir Pending =

- Main characters: Mustaq
- Publisher: Phantomville Publishing House

Creative team
- Writers: Naseer Ahmed
- Artists: Saurabh Singh

Kashmir Pending is a graphic novel written by Srinagar-based Naseer Ahmed, and published by Phantomville. It tells the story of several characters in Kashmir and deals with strife in the region. The book met with positive reviews, praising the handling of the subject, characterisations, and art.

== See also ==
- Indian comics
