= Believe =

Believe most often refers to:

- Belief, a psychological state in which an individual holds a proposition or premise to be true, with or without proof for such proposition
- Faith, a belief in something which has not been proven

Believe may also refer to:

== Arts, entertainment, and media ==
=== Films ===
- Believe, a 2000 horror film starring Ben Gazzara
- Believe, a 2000 short film starring James Roday
- Believe (2007 film), a mockumentary film starring Larry Bagby
- Believe (2013 film), a sports drama starring Brian Cox
- Believe (2016 film), a Christmas drama starring Ryan O'Quinn
- Believe: The Eddie Izzard Story, a 2009 documentary about Eddie Izzard
- Justin Bieber's Believe, a 2013 concert film starring Justin Bieber

=== Music ===
==== Albums ====
- Believe (33Miles album), 2009
- Believe (Celtic Woman album), 2011
- Believe (Cher album), or the title song (see below), 1998
- Believe (Dima Bilan album), or the title song (see below), 2009
- Believe (Disturbed album), or the title song, 2002
- Believe (Emerson Drive album), or the title song, 2009
- Believe (Girlschool album), 2004
- Believe (Jai McDowall album), 2011
- Believe (The Jets album), 1989
- Believe (Justin Bieber album), or the title song, 2012
- Believe (Katherine Jenkins album), 2009
- Believe (Th' Legendary Shack Shakers album), 2004
- Believe (Morgan Page album), or the title song, 2010
- Believe (Natalie Grant album), 2005
- Believe (Orianthi album), or the title song, originally by Niels Brinck (see below), 2009
- Believe (Savatage album), or the title song (see below), 1998
- Believe (Yolanda Adams album), 2001
- Believe (Sugarboy album), 2017
- Believe, by Big Dismal, 2003
- Believe, by Carlo Resoort (recording as 4 Strings), 2002
- Believe, by Eunice Olsen, 2004
- Believe, by George Nozuka, 2007
- Believe, by Harem Scarem, Japanese title for Karma Cleansing, 1997
- Believe, by Katie Armiger, 2008
- Believe, by Ross Copperman, 2003

==== EPs ====
- Believe (EP), by Versailles, 2005
- Believe, by Indecision

==== Songs ====
- "Believe" (The Bravery song), 2007
- "Believe" (Brooks & Dunn song), 2005
- "Believe" (The Chemical Brothers song), 2005
- "Believe" (Cher song), 1998
- "Believe" (Crystal Waters song), 2016
- "Believe" (Dima Bilan song), winner of the Eurovision Song Contest 2008
- "Believe" (Elton John song), 1994
- "Believe" (Goldie song), 1998
- "Believe" (Josh Groban song), from the film The Polar Express, 2004
- "Believe" (Kalafina song), 2014
- "Believe" (Lenny Kravitz song), 1993
- "Believe" (Luna Sea song), 1993
- "Believe" (Meek Mill song), 2020
- "Believe" (Misia song), 1999
- "Believe" (Mumford & Sons song), 2015
- "Believe" (Nami Tamaki song), 2003
- "Believe" (Staind song), 2008
- "Believe" (Suzie McNeil song), 2007, from Broken & Beautiful
- "Believe / Kumorinochi, Kaisei", a single by Arashi, 2009
- "Believe Again" (Niels Brinck song), covered as "Believe" by Orianthi, 2009
- "Believe", by Ai from What's Goin' On Ai
- "Believe", by Aiden from Conviction
- "Believe", by Alexandra Burke from The Truth Is
- "Believe", by The All-American Rejects from When the World Comes Down
- "Believe", by All Things New from The Good News
- "Believe", by Amen Dunes from Freedom
- "Believe", by Antiloop
- "Believe", by Asking Alexandria from From Death to Destiny
- "Believe", by Beartooth from Disease
- "Believe", by Big K.R.I.T. from K.R.I.T. Iz Here
- "Believe", by Billlie from The Collective Soul and Unconscious: Chapter One
- "Believe", by Blue October
- "Believe", by Branden Steineckert, club anthem for Real Salt Lake of Major League Soccer
- "Believe", by Breaking Benjamin from We Are Not Alone
- "Believe", by Carola Häggkvist
- "Believe", by Coldrain from 8AM
- "Believe", by DB Boulevard
- "Believe", by Devin Townsend from Epiclouder demos
- "Believe", by Dig
- "Believe", by Eminem from Revival
- "Believe", by Flickerstick from Causing a Catastrophe
- "Believe", by Folder 5
- "Believe", by Hollywood Undead from Notes from the Underground
- "Believe", by Ian Van Dahl from Lost & Found
- "Believe", by Julian Lennon from Photograph Smile
- "Believe", by K's Choice from Cocoon Crash
- "Believe", by Miliyah Kato
- "Believe", by Nidji from Breakthru'
- "Believe", by Nightmare from Ultimate Circus
- "Believe", by Norther from Circle Regenerated
- "Believe", by Psycho Motel from Welcome to the World
- "Believe", by Riot from Immortal Soul
- "Believe", by Savatage from Streets: A Rock Opera
- "Believe", by Shawn Mendes from the soundtrack to Descendants
- "Believe", by Skillet Awake
- "Believe", by Since October from Life, Scars, Apologies
- "Believe", by The Smashing Pumpkins from Judas O
- "Believe", by Take That from III
- "Believe", by Travis Garland
- "Believe", by Uriah Heep from Into the Wild
- "Be(lie)ve", by While She Sleeps from This Is the Six
- "Believe", by Yellowcard from Ocean Avenue
- "Believe", from The Scarlet Pimpernel
- "Believe (Waiting for an Answer)", by The Afters from Life is Beautiful

==== Tours ====
- Believe Tour, by Justin Bieber
- Do You Believe? (tour), by Cher, also known as Believe Tour

=== Shows ===
- "Believe", a Shamu show at three SeaWorld parks
- Believe... There's Magic in the Stars, a fireworks display at Disneyland
- Criss Angel Believe, a Cirque du Soleil show in Las Vegas

=== Television ===
- Believe (TV series), a 2014 American science fantasy series
- "Believe" (The Good Doctor), a 2019 episode
- "Believe" (My Hero), a 2006 episode

=== Other uses in arts, entertainment, and media ===
- Believe, a 2010 The Boys comics story arc in the volume The Innocents
- "Believe", a marketing campaign for the video game Halo 3
- Believe Music, a French digital music company

== Other uses ==
- Believe (fragrance), by Britney Spears
- Believe (horse), a Japanese Thoroughbred racehorse

== See also ==
- Belief (disambiguation)
- Believe It (disambiguation)
- Believer (disambiguation)
- I Believe (disambiguation)
- Faith (disambiguation)
