= Cuba–Israel relations =

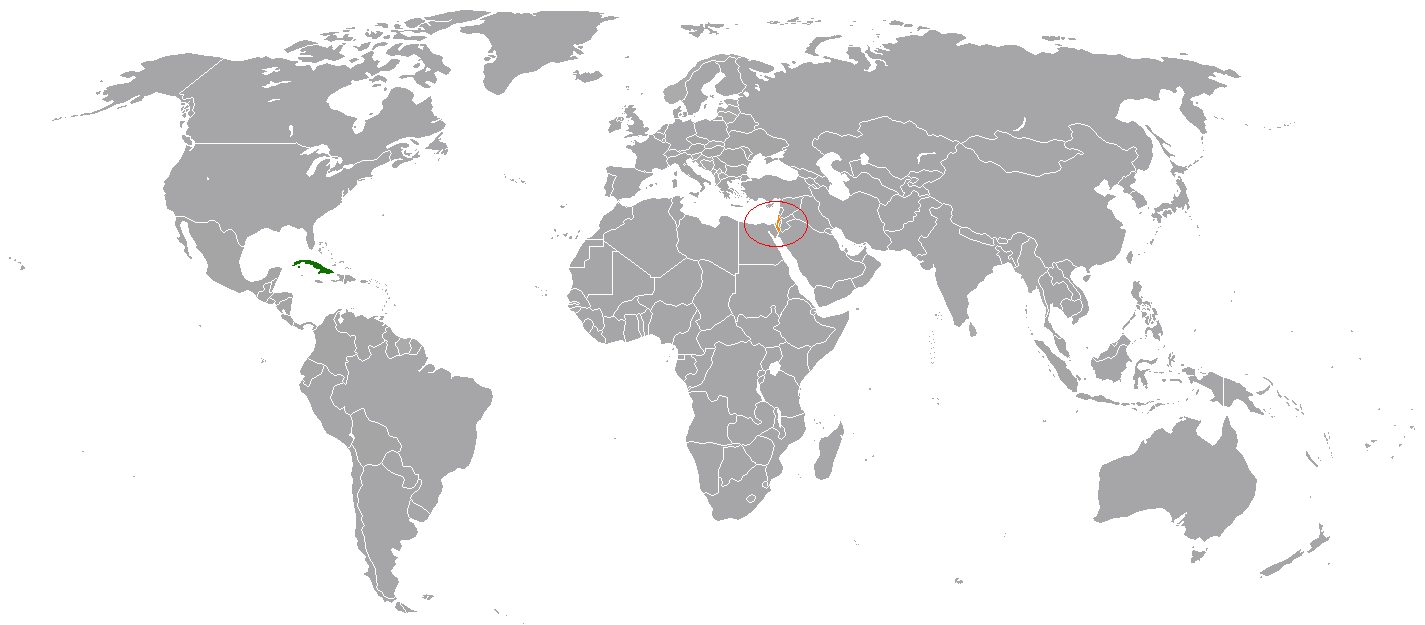

- Cuba: Israel

Cuba–Israel relations refers to the current and historical relations between the Republic of Cuba and the State of Israel. Both nations have not had official diplomatic relations since 1973. Israel maintains an Interest Section in the Canadian embassy in Havana. Cuba and a few other countries in the Western Hemisphere such as Belize (since 2023), Bolivia (2009–2019 and 2023–2025), Colombia (2024–2026), Nicaragua (2010–2017 and since 2024) have suspended ties with Israel, and Cuba went even further by withdrawing diplomatic recognition.

== History ==
=== Early relations ===
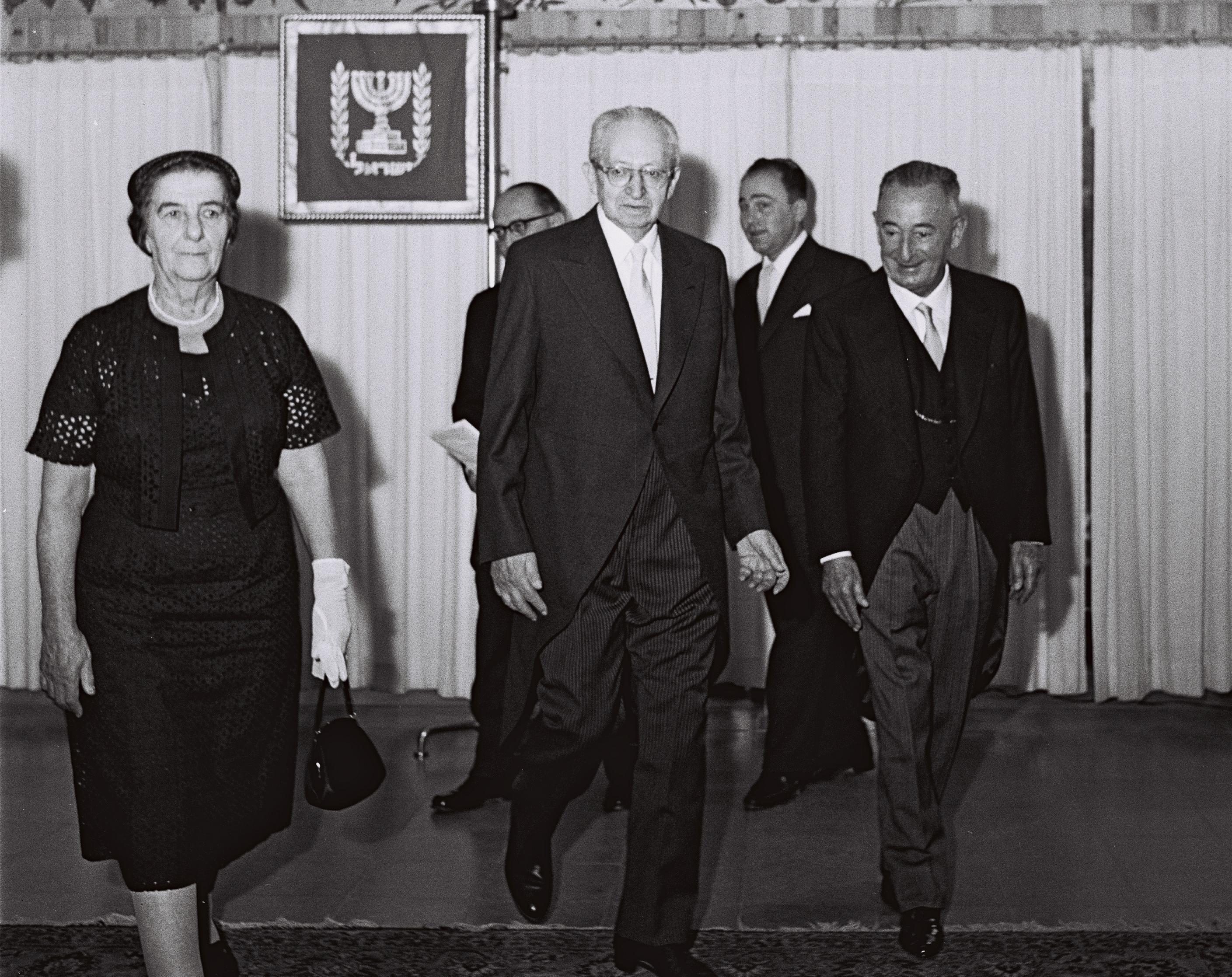
Cuban Ambassador Ricardo Wolf with Israeli President Yitzhak Ben-Zvi and Foreign Minister Golda Meir in Jerusalem, 1960

Since the establishment of Israel, relations between Cuba and Israel have been turbulent. In 1919, Cuba supported the idea of independence of the Jewish people and condemned the extermination of Jews by the Third Reich in 1942. On 29 November 1947, Cuba was the only country in the Americas to vote against the United Nations Partition Plan for Palestine which led to the founding of Israel. Despite the vote, Cuba recognized Israel and both nations established diplomatic relations in 1949. In 1952, Israel opened an honorary consulate in Havana and upgraded the consulate to a diplomatic legation in 1954. Cuba opened a diplomatic office in Israel in 1957.

In January 1959, Fidel Castro came into power and became Prime Minister of Cuba. Castro appointed Ricardo Wolf as ambassador to Israel in 1961. During the 1960s, Prime Minister Castro began to develop close alliances with Arab nations. After the Six-Day War in June 1967, Cuba and Romania were the only socialist countries to not break diplomatic ties with Israel. Between 1967 and 1970, Cuba sent military assistance to Egypt during the War of Attrition to help the nation take the Sinai Peninsula which was occupied by Israeli troops after the Six-Day War.

During a summit of the Non-Aligned Movement held in Algeria in September 1973, Cuba announced that they would break diplomatic relations with Israel. Cuba assisted Egypt and Syria in the Yom Kippur War against Israel by sending troops and equipment to Syria. After the war, relations between Cuba and Israel were non-existent. Israel and the United States were the only two nations since 1992 to annually vote in favor (except 2016) of the embargo against Cuba at the UN General Assembly against overwhelming global opposition.

=== Post 1991 ===
In December 1991, the Dissolution of the Soviet Union occurred which severely affected the Cuban state economically. Cuba's foreign policy changed dramatically with the nation no longer sending military aid and troops to other nations. In 1992, Israeli companies began operating in Cuba led by former Israeli Minister Raffi Eitan. Israeli tourists also started to visit the island nation.

In 1994, during the inauguration of Nelson Mandela as President of South Africa, President Castro met with Israeli President Ezer Weizman. Between 1995 and 1999, Castro allowed 400 Cuban Jews to immigrate to Israel with the assistance of the Canadian government known as Operation Cigar. In 1996, during the funeral of former French President François Mitterrand, President Castro met and spoke with Israeli Minister Shimon Peres. In 2000, President Castro and Prime Minister Ehud Barak met at the Millennium Summit in New York.

In September 2010, while speaking with American journalist Jeffrey Goldberg, Fidel Castro announced that he believed that Israel has a right to exist as a Jewish state and denounced Holocaust deniers. Castro also expressed concern with regards to Iran’s nuclear ambition. After Castro's remarks, Prime Minister Benjamin Netanyahu praised Castro for his statements. There has been talk of re-establishment of diplomatic relations between both nations, however, no major steps have been taken.

Miguel Díaz-Canel, the first non-Castro leader of Cuba since the revolution, condemned Israel's actions in the Gaza war.

== See also ==
- History of the Jews in Cuba
