= I Believe =

I Believe may refer to:

== Music ==
=== Albums ===
- I Believe (Dr. Alban album), and the title song, 1997
- I Believe (Irfan Makki album), and the title song, 2011
- I Believe (Johnny Cash album), a 1984 reissue of songs from A Believer Sings the Truth (1979)
- I Believe (Marvin Sapp album), 2002
- I Believe (Rapture Ruckus album), and the title song, 2006
- I Believe (Sérgio Mendes album), and the title cover version of a Stevie Wonder song (see below), 1975
- I Believe (Tata Young album), and the title cover version of the Carola Häggkvist song "I Believe in Love", 2004
- I Believe (Tim Burgess album), 2003
- I Believe, by the LeBrón Brothers, 1969
- I Believe, by Lee Soo-young, 1999
- I Believe, by R.W. Hampton, 2005
- I Believe, by Willie Norwood, and the title song, 2006
- I Believe, by Phil Wickham, and the title song, 2023

=== Songs ===
- "I Believe" (Blessid Union of Souls song), 1995
- "I Believe" (Bon Jovi song), 1993
- "I Believe" (Bro'Sis song), 2001
- "I Believe" (Chilliwack song), 1982
- "I Believe" (DJ Khaled song), 2018
- "I Believe" (Diamond Rio song), 2002
- "I Believe" (EMF song), 1991
- "I Believe" (Fantasia song), 2004
- "I Believe" (Frankie Laine song), 1953, recorded by many others
- "I Believe" (Galleon song), 2001
- "I Believe" (George Strait song), 2013
- "I Believe" (Happy Clappers song), 1995
- "I Believe" (Killswitch Engage song), 2025
- "I Believe" (Marcella Detroit song), 1994, covered by Joana Zimmer (2005)
- "I Believe" (Nikki Yanofsky song), 2010
- "I Believe" (R. Kelly song), 2008
- "I Believe" (Sash! song), 2002
- "I Believe" (Sounds of Blackness song), 1994
- "I Believe" (Stephen Gately song), 2000
- "I Believe" (Tears for Fears song), 1985
- "I Believe (Get Over Yourself)", by Nico Vega, 2014
- "I Believe (When I Fall in Love It Will Be Forever)", by Stevie Wonder, 1972
- "(I Believe) Love's a Prima Donna", by Steve Harley & Cockney Rebel, 1976
- "I Believe", by Abra Moore from On the Way
- "I Believe", by Ayaka, 2006
- "I Believe", by Bob Sinclar
- "I Believe", by Booth and the Bad Angel
- "I Believe", by Bosson from One in a Million
- "I Believe", by Buzzcocks from A Different Kind of Tension
- "I Believe", by Caroline Polachek from Desire, I Want to Turn Into You
- "I Believe", by Chicago from Chicago 18
- "I Believe", by Chris Isaak from Forever Blue
- "I Believe", by David Hasselhoff and Laura Branigan from the television series Baywatch
- "I Believe", by Dethklok from The Doomstar Requiem
- "I Believe", by Elliot Minor from Solaris
- "I Believe", by Era from The Very Best of Era, also covered by Katherine Jenkins with Andrea Bocelli
- "I Believe", by Galneryus from The Stars Will Light the Way
- "I Believe", by HammerFall from Glory to the Brave
- "I Believe", by Helloween from Chameleon
- "I Believe", by The High Spirits
- "I Believe", by Ian Dury and the Blockheads from Ten More Turnips from the Tip
- "I Believe", by Jessica Mauboy from Beautiful
- "I Believe", by Joe Satriani from Flying in a Blue Dream
- "I Believe", by Jonas Brothers from Happiness Begins
- "I Believe", by Manowar from Dawn of Battle
- "I Believe", by Paulini from Superwoman
- "I Believe", by R.E.M. from Lifes Rich Pageant
- "I Believe", by Robert Plant from Fate of Nations
- "I Believe", by Shadow Gallery from Tyranny
- "I Believe", by Shin Seung Hun from the soundtrack of the film My Sassy Girl
- "I Believe", by Simian Mobile Disco from Attack Decay Sustain Release
- "I Believe", by Soulfly from Prophecy
- "I Believe", by Steve Perry from Street Talk
- "I Believe", by Stephen Gately from New Beginning
- "I Believe", by Third Day from Wire
- "I Believe", by Tiffany Thornton and Kermit the Frog
- "I Believe", by Tigertailz from Wazbones
- "I Believe", by Tomomi Kahala
- "I Believe", by Yolanda Adams from Honey: Music from & Inspired by the Motion Picture
- "I Believe", from the film It Happened in Brooklyn
- "I Believe", from the musical Altar Boyz
- "I Believe", from the musical The Book of Mormon
- "I Believe", from the musical Spring Awakening

== Other uses ==
- I Believe (film), a 2016 Singaporean short directed by Leroy Lim
- I Believe, a 2017 film featuring Wilford Brimley
- I Believe, a play by Gibson Kente

== See also ==
- Credo (disambiguation)
- I Do Believe (disambiguation)
- I Believe in You (disambiguation)
- Believe (disambiguation)
