= The Believers (comics) =

Graphic novel

The Believers is a graphic novel written by Abdul Sultan P P with illustrations by Partha Sengupta, and published by Phantomville. It tells the story of two brothers living in two extremes from the Malappuram region of Kerala, one of whom returns to find his brother has engaged in extremist activities.

Abdul Sultan P P is Chief of Operation with "Spacerolls Aerospace Technologies, www.spacerolls.com and has worked with Varthamanam Daily and Middle East Chandrika, Riyadh, Saudi Arabia, as News Editor. The Believers reminds the extremist forces that 'eye for an eye leaves two blind'. It is regarded as the third Indian graphic novel after Sarnath Banerjee's Corridor and Orijit Sen's River of Stories.

== Reviews ==
The book met with positive opinion, praising artwork and writing.

== See also ==
- Indian comics
