= Centro Hebreo Sefaradi Synagogue =

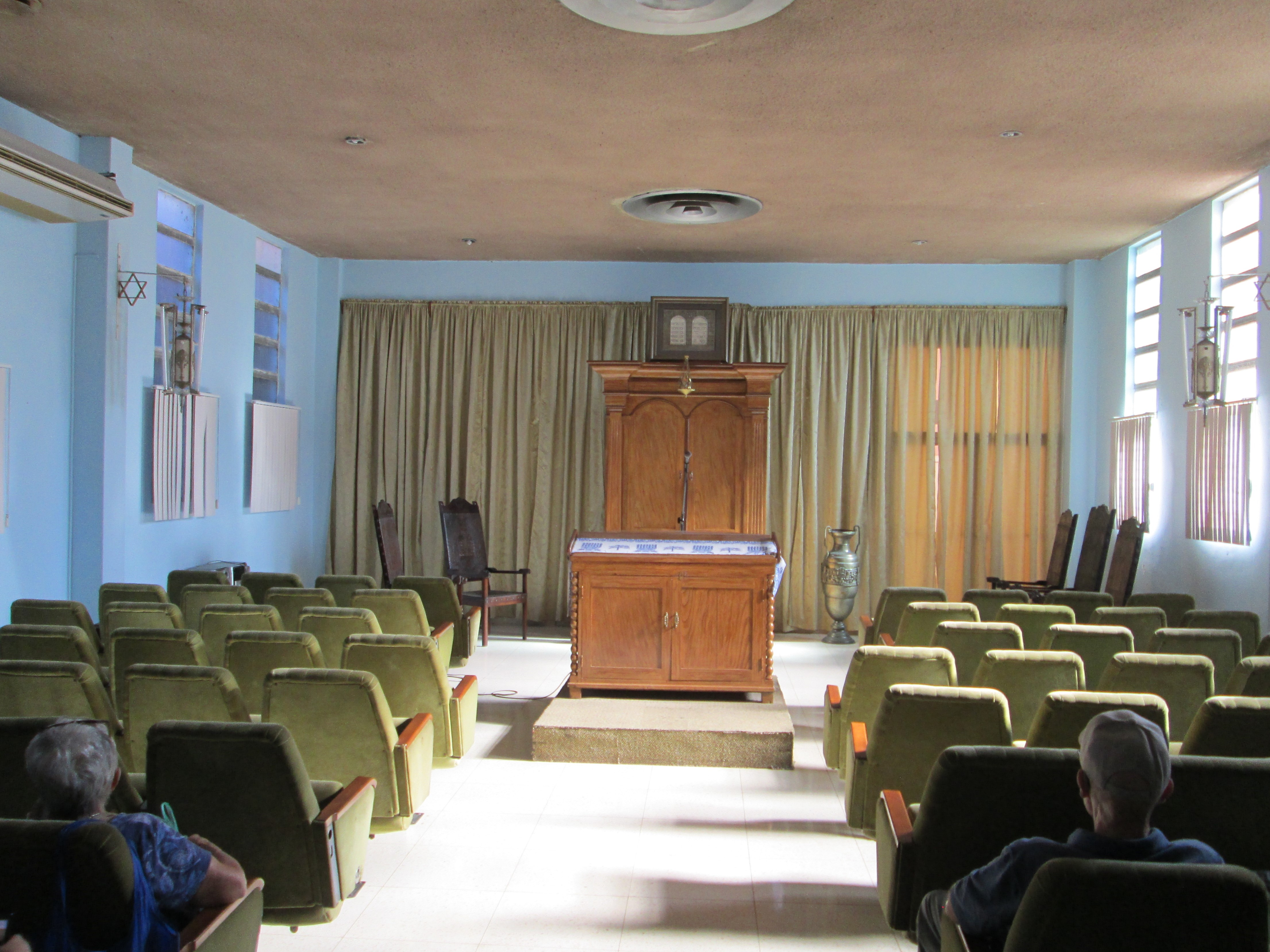
- The synagogue sanctuary, in 2019

- Location of the synagogue in Cuba

Religion
- Affiliation: Conservative Judaism
- Rite: Sephardi
- Ecclesiastical or organizational status: Synagogue
- Status: Active

Location
- Location: Havana
- Country: Cuba
- Interactive map of Centro Hebreo Sefaradi Synagogue
- Coordinates: 23°08′16″N 82°23′31″W

Architecture
- Groundbreaking: 1957
- Completed: 1960

The Centro Hebreo Sefaradi Synagogue is a Conservative Jewish congregation and synagogue, located in Havana, Cuba.

== History ==
Construction began in 1957 and the synagogue was completed in 1960 with a 726-seat sanctuary. The main sanctuary was later rented out to the Afro-Cuban band Síntesis for their rehearsals while weekly religious services were held in a small room next door.

In 2007 Centro Hebreo Sefaradi Synagogue was described as “…the only remaining institutional legacy of the Sephardic presence in Cuba.” As of 2010, the synagogue had eighty families constituting 320 members. The majority of congregants were 60 or older.

Centro Hebreo is affiliated with the Conservative movement in the United States. There is a small Holocaust memorial at the synagogue with quotations from José Martí.

== Gallery ==
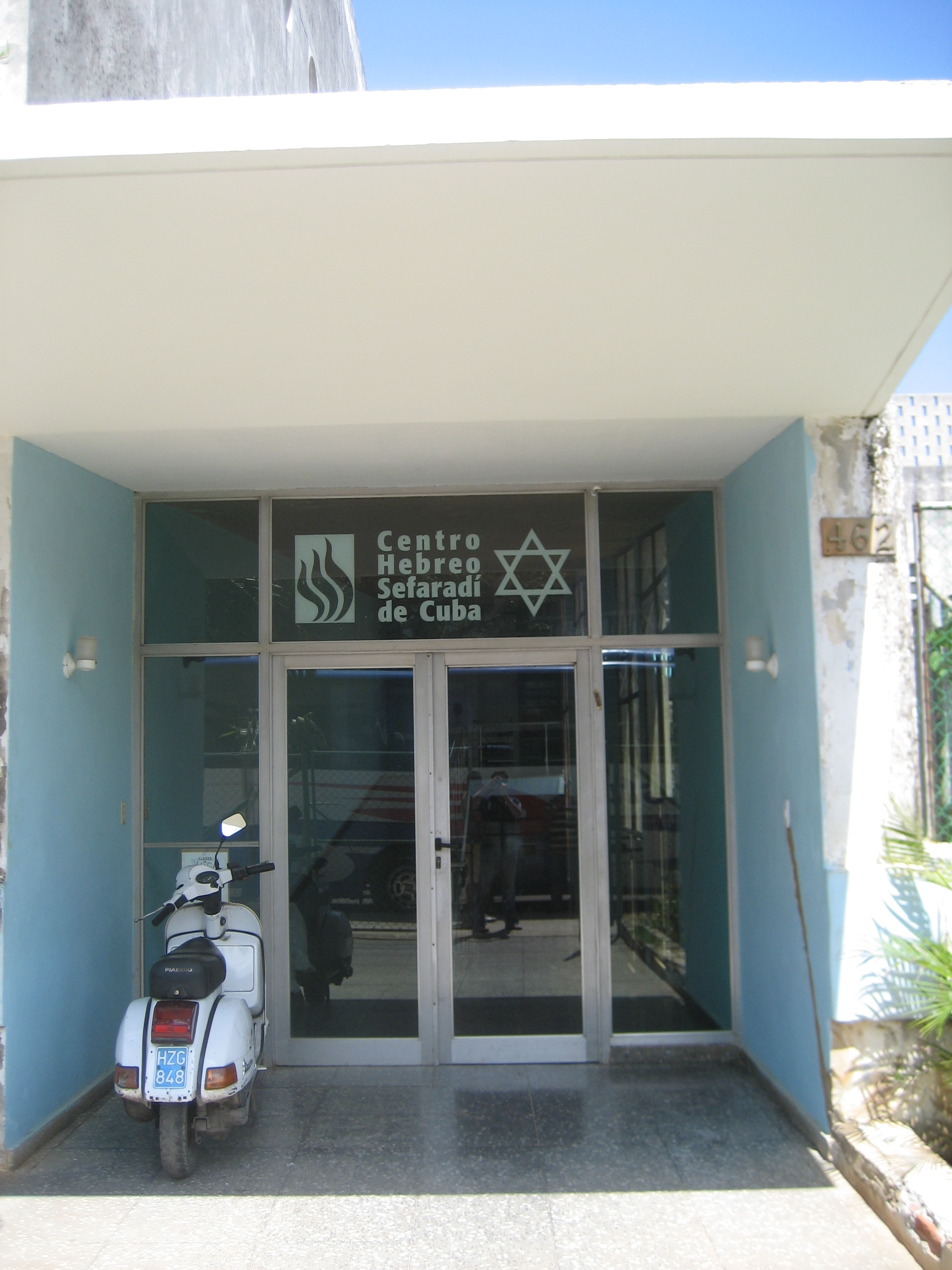
Front entrance

== See also ==
- History of the Jews in Cuba
- List of synagogues in Cuba
