= Ruth Behar =

Cuban-American anthropologist and writer

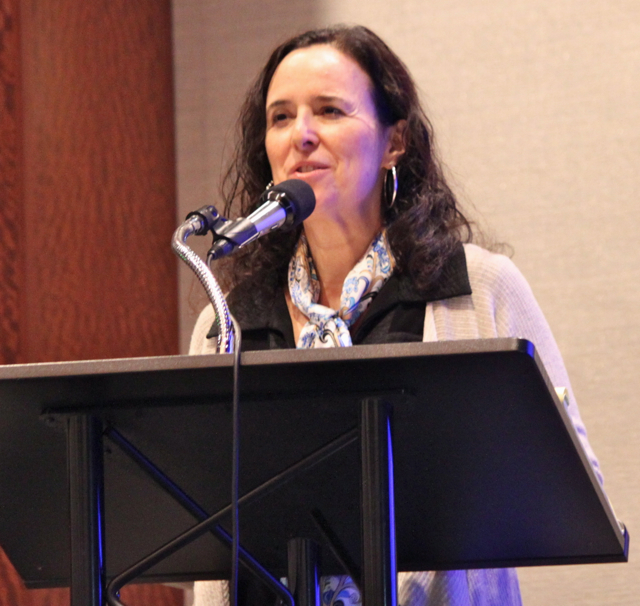
- Born: Havana, Cuba
- Education: Princeton University; Wesleyan University
- Scientific career
- Fields: Cultural Anthropology
- Workplaces: University of Michigan, Ann Arbor

Ruth Behar is a Cuban-American anthropologist and writer. Her work includes academic studies, as well as poetry, memoir, and literary fiction. As an anthropologist, she has argued for the open adoption and acknowledgement of the subjective nature of research and participant-observers. She is a recipient of the Belpré Medal.

== Life and work ==
Ruth Behar was born in 1956 in Havana, Cuba to a Jewish-Cuban family. Her father, Isaac Behar Mizrahi, was from a Sephardic Jewish family. Her father's parents had immigrated from Turkey to Cuba in the early twentieth century as part of a wave of Sephardic Jewish immigrants fleeing the disintegrating Ottoman Empire, the Balkan Wars, and the prospect of their sons’ conscription into the Ottoman army. Her father's side of the family spoke a combination of Judaeo-Spanish and Cuban Spanish. Her mother's side, by contrast, was Ashkenazi Jewish, with her maternal grandparents coming from Poland and Russia. When her Ashkenazi and Sephardic parents married in Havana in 1956, their unusual union was called an "intermarriage." Behar has written about this dual heritage extensively, including in her documentary Adio Kerida and in essays describing her grandparents' Havana wedding photo, the Ladino-speaking household, and the family's connection to Cuba's old Sephardic synagogue, Chevet Ahim (Shevet Akhim).

Ruth was four when her family immigrated to the U.S. following Fidel Castro's gaining power in the revolution of 1959. More than 94% of Cuban Jews left the country at that time, together with many others of the middle and upper classes. Behar attended local schools and studied as an undergraduate at Wesleyan University, receiving her B.A. in 1977. She studied cultural anthropology at Princeton University, earning her doctorate in 1983.

In 1988, Behar was the first Latina woman to be awarded a MacArthur Fellowship.

She travels regularly to Cuba and Mexico to study aspects of culture, as well as to investigate her family's roots in Cuba. She has specialized in studying the lives of women in developing societies.

Behar is a professor at the Department of Anthropology at the University of Michigan in Ann Arbor. Her literary work is featured in the Michigan State University's Michigan Writers Series. A writer of anthropology, essays, poetry and fiction, Behar focuses on issues related to women and feminism.

=== Lucky Broken Girl ===
Lucky Broken Girl (2017) is multicultural coming-of-age novel for young adults, based on the author's childhood in the 1960s. Ruthie Mizrahi and her family recently emigrated from Castro's Cuba to New York City. Just when she's finally beginning to gain confidence in her mastery of English –and enjoying her reign as her neighborhood's hopscotch queen – a horrific car accident leaves her in a body cast and confined to her bed for a long recovery. As Ruthie's world shrinks because of her inability to move, her powers of observation and her heart grow larger and she comes to understand how fragile life is, how vulnerable we all are as human beings, and how friends, neighbors, and the power of the arts can sweeten even the worst of times. Writing for Cuba Counterpoints, Julie Schwietert Collazo writes, "Behar, without fail, always seems to be writing with the goal of honoring her own history, experiences, and feelings, without ever denying or excluding those of others, and in Lucky Broken Girl the achievement of this goal is evident on every page." Professor Jonda C. McNair also highlights the importance of Ruth Behar using her personal experience as a Cuban American of Sephardic Turkish, Ashkenazi Polish and Russian ancestry to write stories that are culturally authentic.

=== Traveling Heavy ===
Traveling Heavy (2013) is a memoir about her Cuban-American family, descended from both Ashkenazi and Sephardic Jews in Cuba, as well as the strangers who ease her journey in life. Her probings about her complicated Jewish Cuban ancestry and family's immigration to America explore issues about identity and belonging. Kirkus Reviews described her book as "A heartfelt witness to the changing political and emotional landscape of the Cuban-American experience." Behar studies the revitalization of Cuban Jewish life as an anthropologist, but her personal journey back to the island she left as a little girl is the heart of this "memoir I snuck in, between journeys."

=== An Island Called Home ===
An Island Called Home (2007) was written in Behar's quest for a better understanding of Jewish Cuba and particularly her family's roots. She noted, "I knew the stories of the Jews in Cuba, but it was all about looking at them as a community". Traveling the island, Behar becomes the confidante to a host of Jewish strangers, building connections for further anthropological research. Conducting one-on-one interviews, combined with black-and-white photography, she builds readers an image of the diasporic thread connecting Cuban Jews to one another.

Beginning with Jewish immigrants of the 1920s, who fled unrest in Turkey, Russia and Poland, she moves on to stories of later immigrants, Polish and German Jews who fled to Cuba in the 1930s and 1940s in order to escape persecution and the concentration camps of the Nazis. In Cuba immigrants opened mom-and-pop shops, peddled, and gradually adopted Spanish while still speaking Yiddish, settling into Latino life in La Habana Vieja. In the early part of the century, many Jewish immigrants worked in the Cuban garment industry. More than 94% left during and after the 1959 revolution. As her family was among those who left Cuba, Behar intertwines her personal thoughts and feelings with her professional, analytical observations of the current society.

=== The Vulnerable Observer ===
The Vulnerable Observer recounts Behar's passage to integrating subjective aspects into her anthropological studies. Suffering her grandfather's death while on a field trip to Spain to study funeral practices, she decided the ethnographer could never be fully detached, and needed to become a "vulnerable observer". She argues that the ethnographic fieldworker should identify and work though, his or her own emotional involvement with the subject under study. She strongly critiques conventional ideas of objectivity. She suggested that the ideal of a "scientific," distanced, impersonal mode of presenting materials was incomplete. Other anthropologists, including Claude Levi-Strauss, Georges Devereux, and Clifford Geertz, had also suggested that the researcher had to claim being part of the process more openly. Behar's six personal essays in The Vulnerable Observer are examples of her subjective approach.

Behar's grandparents emigrated to Cuba from Russia, Poland and Turkey during the 1920s. In 1962 they fled Cuba to escape Castro's communism. At the age of nine, Behar suffered a broken leg from the crash of her family's car. She was immobilized for a year. The experience and recovery period led her to the recognition that "the body is a homeland" of stored memory and pain.

=== Translated Woman ===
In 1985, Behar was working in Mexico when she befriended an Indian witch working as a street peddler. Townspeople said the witch, Esperanza Hernandez, had used black magic to blind her ex-husband after he regularly beat her and then left her for his mistress. Behar's portrayal of Esperanza's story in Translated Woman suggests she alienated her own mother, inspiring Behar to portray Esperanza as a feminist heroine. Esperanza claims she found redemption in a spiritualist cult constructed around Pancho Villa. She blamed pent-up rage about her husband and life as the reason for the deaths in infancy of the first six of her 12 children. Esperanza's rage led her to beat up her husband's lover, throw her son out of the house, beat a daughter for refusing to support her, and disown another son for having an affair with an uncle's ex-mistress because she considered it to be incestuous. Behar reflects on her own life and begins to think that her Latina-gringa conflicts result from a feeling of loss after having tried to model herself according to the American Dream, thus losing some sense of her Cuban Jewish family's past in that island nation. Esperanza's odyssey examines physical borders, margins and separations. Translated Woman contributes to the feminist argument that studying women in anthropology has been undervalued due to traditional academic prejudices that view women-centered analysis as too personally biased.

== Awards and honours ==
- MacArthur Fellowship (1988)
- Newbery Honor (2025) – Across So Many Seas

== Selected bibliography ==
=== Books ===
- The Presence of the Past in a Spanish Village: Santa María del Monte (1986)
- Translated Woman: Crossing the Border with Esperanza's Story (1993; second edition, Beacon Press, 2003 ISBN 978-0-8070-4647-0)
- Bridges to Cuba / Puentes a Cuba, editor, University of Michigan Press, 1995, ISBN 978-0-472-06611-7
- Women Writing Culture Editors Ruth Behar, Deborah A. Gordon, University of California Press, 1995, ISBN 978-0-520-20208-5
- The Vulnerable Observer: Anthropology That Breaks Your Heart, Beacon Press, 1996, ISBN 978-0-8070-4631-9
- An Island Called Home: Returning to Jewish Cuba, Rutgers University Press, 2007, ISBN 978-0-8135-4189-1
- The Portable Island: Cubans at Home in the World, Editors Ruth Behar, Lucía M. Suárez, Macmillan, 2008, ISBN 978-0-230-60477-3
- Traveling Heavy: A Memoir in Between Journeys, Duke University Press, 2013, ISBN 978-0-8223-5720-9
- Lucky Broken Girl, Nancy Paulsen Books, 2017, ISBN 978-0399546440
- Letters from Cuba, Nancy Paulsen Books, 2020, ISBN 978-0525516477
- Tia Fortuna's New Home: A Jewish Cuban Journey, Knopf Books for Young Readers, 2022, ISBN 978-0593172414
- Across So Many Seas, Nancy Paulsen Books, 2024, ISBN 978-0593323403

=== Film ===
- Adio Kerida (Goodbye Dear Love): A Cuban-American Woman's Search for Sephardic Memories (2002)

== See also ==
- Cuban American literature
- List of Cuban-American writers
