= Unbeliever (disambiguation) =

An unbeliever or infidel is one accused of unbelief in the central tenets of a religion.

Unbeliever or unbelievers may also refer to:

== Film ==
- The Unbeliever, 1918 American silent propaganda film made towards the end of World War I
- The Unbelievers, a 2013 documentary film about atheists Richard Dawkins and Lawrence Krauss

== Music ==
- "Unbeliever", a song by Skrewdriver from All Skrewed Up 1977
- "Unbeliever", a song by Australian rock band Hunters & Collectors "Throw Your Arms Around Me" 1984
- "Unbeliever", a song by Therapy on Troublegum 1994
- "Unbeliever", a song by Greek death metal band Septic Flesh Sumerian Daemons 2003
- "Unbeliever", a song by American metalcore band Architects Daybreaker 2012
- "The Unbeliever", a song by German power metal band Edguy Theater of Salvation 1999
- "Unbelievers" (song), from the 2013 album Modern Vampires of the City
- "Unbelievers", a song by Starflyer 59 from the album Old 2003

== See also ==
- Believer (disambiguation)
- Heathen (disambiguation)
- Heretic (disambiguation)
- Apostasy
- Atheism, absence of belief in deities
- Heresy
- Sacrilege
