= B'nai B'rith Cuba =

B'nai B'rith in Cuba, is a regional division of B'nai B'rith, an international Jewish social service organization, that was founded in 1943.

== Overview ==
B'nai B'rith Cuba was founded in 1943. The founders were mostly affluent Jewish-American businessmen. Up until the Cuban Revolution, the organisation's efforts centered on combatting antisemitism and conducting philanthropic activities on behalf of the Jewish community in Cuba. After the revolution, the organisation's activities were mostly curtailed although it was never formally disbanded.

In the early 1990s, B'nai B'rith Cuba was revitalized, and a key individual behind this renaissance was Isaac Galen who became the president of the B'nai B'rith Maimonides Lodge in Havana. Under Galen's leadership, the organisation's mission changed to reflect the new situation facing the community. According to Galen, combatting antisemitism in Cuba was no longer a priority concern, additionally, the community did not have the financial capacity to raise funds for philanthropic efforts. Instead, the focus shifted to educational programming.

== Efforts by B'nai B'rith International ==
In 1997, B'nai B'rith International formed a Committee on Cuban Affairs. The committee was formed following a B'nai B'rith humanitarian mission to Cuba that brought medicine, food, and clothes to Cuba.

In one report, B'nai B'rith estimated that the organisation's relief work included exporting over hundreds of thousands of dollars of medical textbooks and wheelchairs to Cuban hospitals and $6,000,000 of medicine, Judaica and other supplies to the Jewish community in Cuba.

== See also ==
- B'nai B'rith Latin America
