= Ringfest =

Former music festival in Cologne, Germany

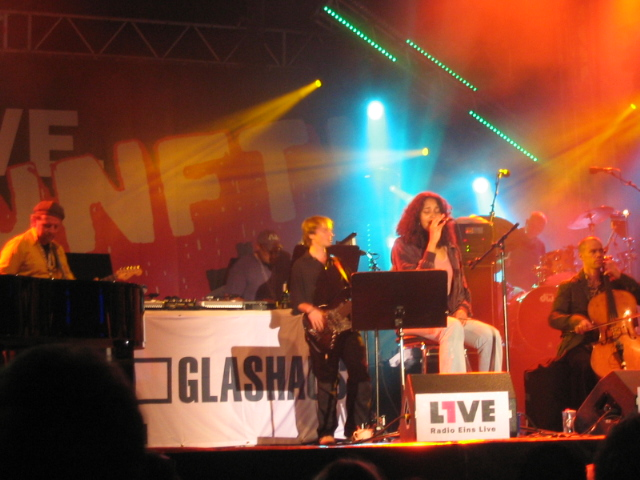
- Cassandra Steen, former singer from the German soul-band Glashaus, 2005 at Ringfest, Cologne.
- Locations: Cologne, Germany
- Years active: 1993-2006

The Musikfest am Ring (aka Ringfest) was an annual outdoor music event in Cologne, Germany held for the first time in 1993 and halted in 2006. In various locations of downtown Cologne stages were set up and live bands performed and also other events were presented. The Ringfest used to be held at the MediaPark, on the Cologne Ring and the Neumarkt square. In 1993 some 300000 visitors attended the festival already, growing to around 2000000 people in 1997, causing the organizers to claim the event to be the world's largest music festival. In 2005, about 500000 visitors attended the festival.

The Ringfest was held for the first time in 1993. Approximately 200 bands have performed each year. Famous German groups such as Selig, Element of Crime, Die Fantastischen Vier, Brings, Fettes Brot, Caught in the Act, Söhne Mannheims, Guano Apes, H-Blockx, Cultured Pearls, Sabrina Setlur, Götz Alsmann, Jürgen Drews, Anne Haigis, Extrabreit, Reamonn, and Sportfreunde Stiller, local bands such as Bläck Fööss, Höhner, Zeltinger Band, The Piano Has Been Drinking, Rausch, Lecker Sachen, Renate Otta, Die Firma and Basta, as well as international stars such as Heather Nova, Sparks, Joshua Kadison, Runrig, The King, Julian Dawson, Cardigans, Manowar, Paul Carrack, Motörhead and Geri Halliwell have also performed.

Since 2006 the Ringfest has not been held any longer. The organizers have justified the lack of organization with the difficulties of the music market.

In the last three years of its life Ringfest held parallel to the music fair Popkomm, which has taken place in Berlin since 2004.

Since 2004, the c/o pop festival has been held in Cologne. The festival focuses on electronic pop music. At the premiere 2004 50000 visitors attended the festival.
