= We Believe (yard sign) =

U.S. political yard sign

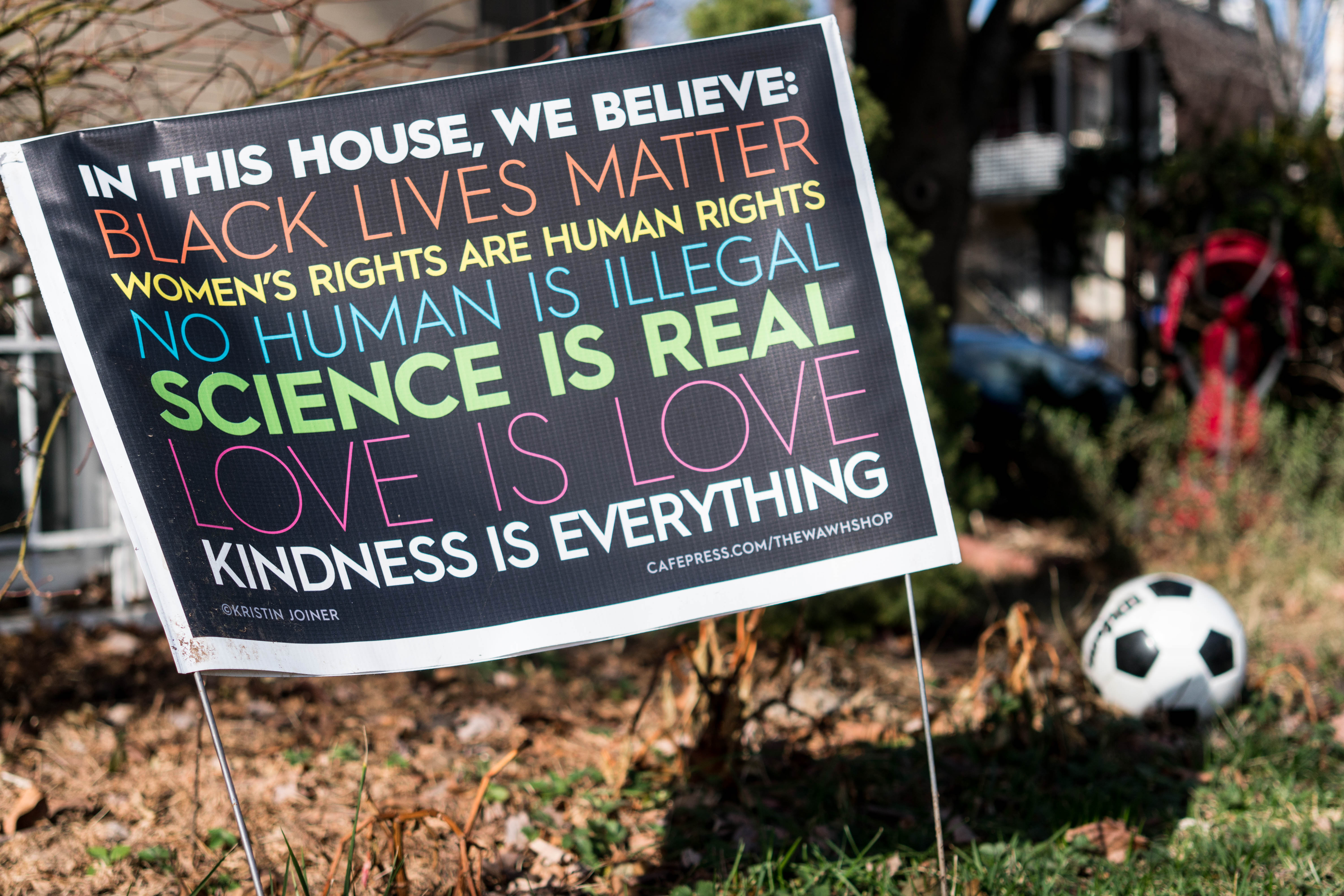
Original "We Believe" sign design

We Believe is a yard sign created as a response to Donald Trump's victory in the 2016 United States presidential election. The sign was originally designed by Kristin Garvey, a librarian from Madison, Wisconsin. The signs became popular among American liberals during Trump's presidency.

== Original design ==
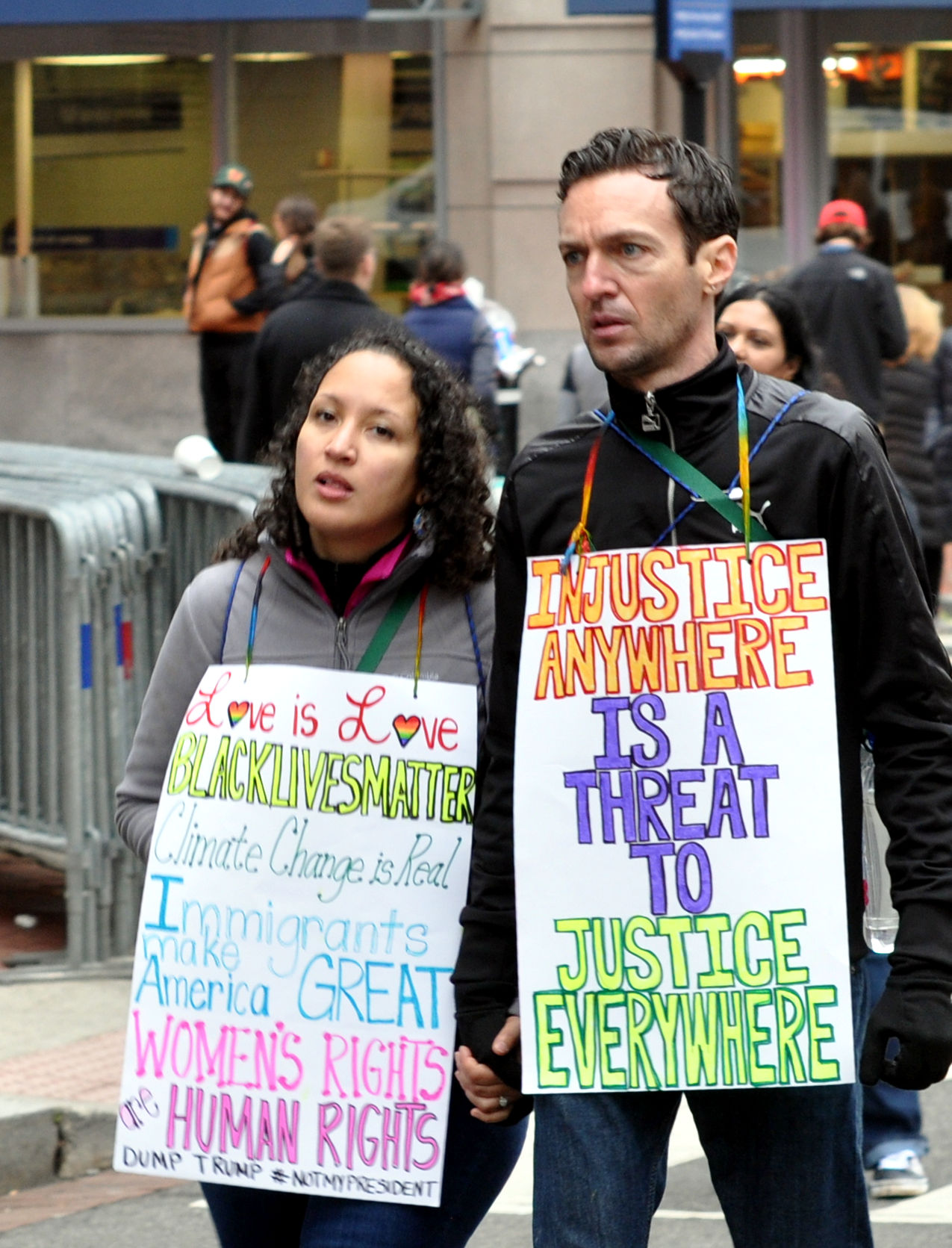
Protesters with a sign inspired by the "We Believe" design at the 2017 Women's March.

The sign's design was originally created by librarian Kristin Garvey, of Madison, Wisconsin. Garvey thought of the concept the day after the 2016 United States presidential election, a day she described as more of a sense of loss than after any other election. She designed the sign by thinking of various groups she anticipated would be negatively affected by Trump's presidency, and attempting to find quotes from liberal activists and politicians in support of such groups.

== Popularity ==
The sign spread rapidly among liberals during Trump's presidency, becoming an almost ubiquitous presence in liberal areas. Some people who have attempted to display the sign have come in conflict with homeowner associations, which can have rules disallowing political yard signs.

The sign has proven popular at protests, including the 2017 Women's March and the George Floyd protests in 2020.

== Variations ==
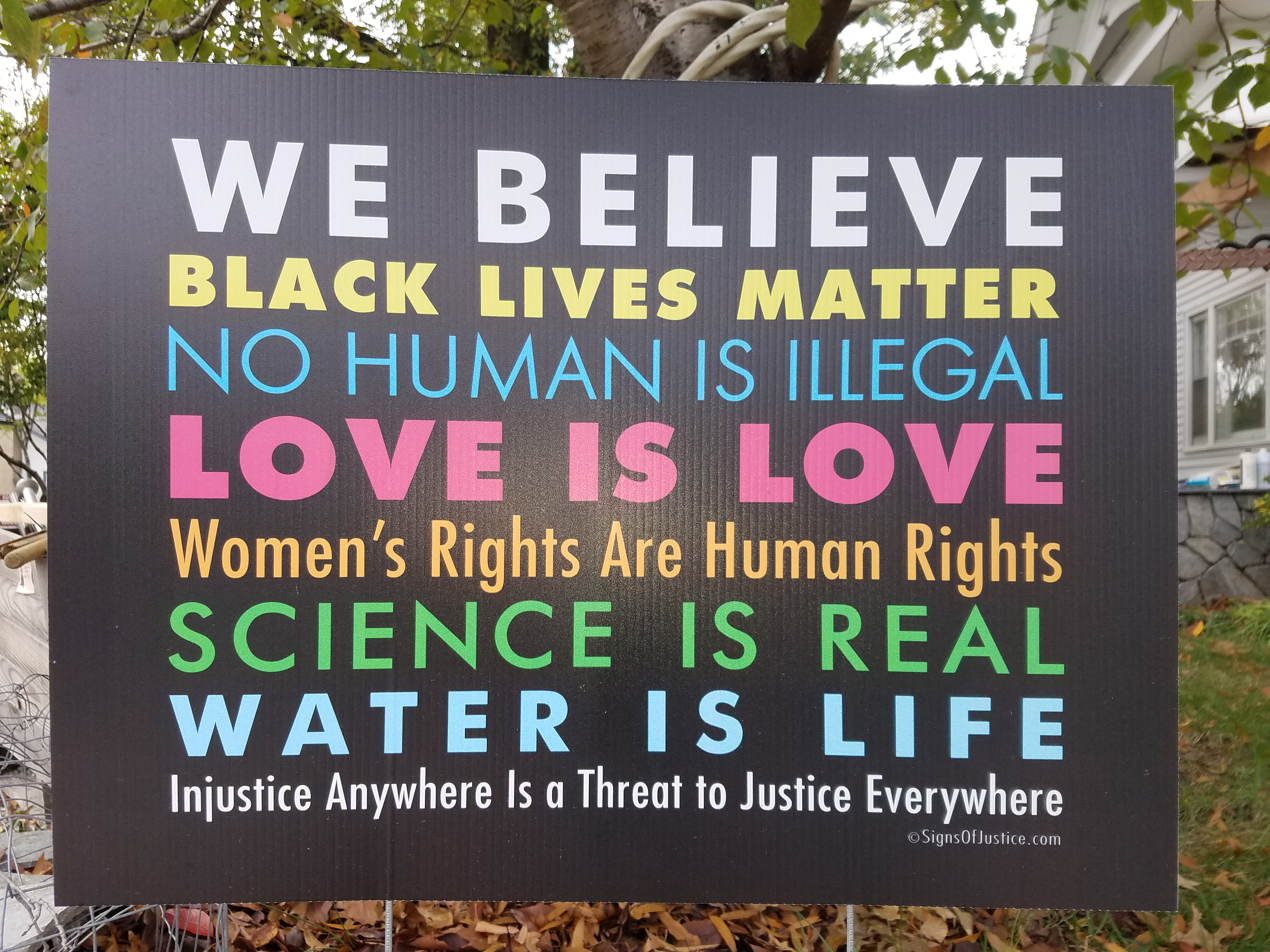
Modified "We Believe" sign design in Arlington, Virginia, October 2020.

The sign has spawned multiple variations, with various levels of agreement with the original message. Some variations have been sold for-profit, which Garvey has expressed her disapproval of, writing: "I don't want people to make money off of it. If they're donating the money they make, then that's fine".

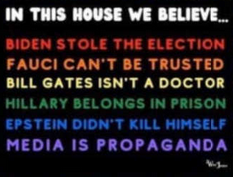
Conservative parody of the "We Believe" yard sign

Parodies of the sign from a right-wing perspective also exist, including one that promoted the conspiracy theory that the 2020 United States presidential election was stolen, that Epstein didn't kill himself, that Anthony Fauci and Bill Gates are untrustworthy, that Hillary Clinton belongs in prison, and that "media is propaganda". This sign was shared with approval by the Jefferson County, Colorado Republican Party.

== See also ==
- Black Lives Matter
- Coexist (image)
- Women's rights are human rights
- Political debate about open borders
- Injustice anywhere is a threat to justice everywhere
