= Believe It =

Believe It may refer to:

- Believe It (album), a 1975 album by the New Tony Williams Lifetime
- "Believe It" (Meek Mill song), 2013
- "Believe It" (White Lies song), 2018
- "Believe It" (PartyNextDoor and Rihanna song), 2020
- Believe It (horse), an American bred racehorse
- Believe It (comics), an Unbelievable Gwenpool storyline, 2016
- Believe it (catchphrase) Used by the anime character Naruto Uzumaki
