= I Do Believe =

I Do Believe may refer to:

- I Do Believe, an album from Gaither Vocal Band discography
- I Do Believe (Tha Feelstyle song), 2006
- I Do Believe (The Highwaymen song), 1995
- "I Do Believe", song and single by Kid Creole and the Coconuts from 2011 album I Wake Up Screaming
- "I Do Believe", song by Clyde McPhatter, B-side of "Maybe", 1962
- "I Do Believe (I Fell in Love)", song by Donna Summer, B-side of "She Works Hard for the Money" 1983
