= Enrique Oltuski =

Cuban politician (1930–2012)

- Portiat of Oltuski, a screenshot from the documentary film Che: Rise & Fall
- Born: October 18, 1930; Kobryń, Polesie Voivodeship, Second Polish Republic
- Died: December 16, 2012 (aged 82); Havana, Cuba
- Education: University of Miami

Enrique Oltuski Osacki (18 October 1930 — 16 December 2012) was a Cuban government minister who participated in the Cuban Revolution.

== Biography ==
Oltuski was born in the city of Kobryn, then within the boundaries of Poland, currently part of Belarus. At four years of age Oltuski emigrated to Cuba with his father, a Jewish shoemaker.

Enrique Oltuski studied at the University of Miami, where he joined Phi Iota Alpha. He graduated in 1954 with a degree in architectural engineering. Oltuski was later hired to work for Shell Oil Co. designing service stations throughout Cuba. While working for Shell Oltuski began collaborating with Fidel Castro in the guerrilla movement known as 26th of July Movement aimed at overthrowing president Fulgencio Batista.

During the Cuban Revolution Oltuski was responsible for the operations of July 26 Movement in the province of Las Villas (now Villa Clara). It was there, in Las Villas that he met Che Guevara as the latter joined the Movement in October 1958. Oltuski would work under Guevara′s command for five years.

Oltuski is a representative of what was known as "the plain” the less radical wing of the revolutionary movement, known for its commitment to the overthrowing Fulgencio Batista and establishment of a liberal democracy. After the triumph of the revolution, As Minister of Communications, Oltuski became one of three ministers members of the "July 26 Movement” to join the first cabinet of the president Manuel Urrutia Lleó. Oltuski would later be appointed vice president of the Central Planning Board, post he held for five years under the command of Ernesto Guevara.

At the time of his death in 2012, Oltuski was serving as Deputy Minister of the Fishing Industry.

== Publications ==
From the year 2000, Oltuski published some books.

- Gente del llano (2000)
- Pescando recuerdos
- Vida Clandestina: My Life in the Cuban Revolution
