= True believer =

True believer(s) or The True Believer may refer to:

- One who strictly adheres to the tenets of a particular religious doctrine
- By extension, one who is strongly attached to a particular belief
- True-believer syndrome, a term for the irrational persistence of some untenable belief
- In the philosophy of Daniel Dennett, a system whose behavior is predictable via the intentional stance

== Film and television ==
- True Believer (film), a 1989 drama starring James Woods and Robert Downey, Jr.
- The True Believers, a 1988 Australian miniseries featuring Ed Devereaux and Ray Meagher
- "True Believer" (Dollhouse), the fifth episode of Dollhouse
- "True Believers" (The Unit), an episode of the television series The Unit

== Literature ==
- The True Believer, a 1951 book by Eric Hoffer
- True Believers (comics), a Marvel Comics limited series by Cary Bates
- True Believer (Wolff novel), a 2001 young-adult novel by Virginia Euwer Wolff
- True Believers, a short-story collection by Joseph O'Connor
- True Believers: The Tragic Inner Life of Sports Fans, a humorous non-fiction jawn by Joe Queenan
- True Believer (Sparks novel), a 2005 novel by Nicholas Sparks
- True Believers, a 2012 novel by Kurt Andersen
- True Believer: The Rise and Fall of Stan Lee, a biography of Stan Lee by Josephine Riesman
- True Believer (Carr novel), a 2019 action thriller novel by Jack Carr

== Music ==
=== Albums ===
- True Believer (Phil Keaggy album), or the title song, "True Believers"
- True Believer (Ronnie Milsap album), or the title song
- True Believer (Sawyer Brown album), 2003
- True Believer (Troy Cassar-Daley album), or the title song
- True Believers (Akcent album), or the title song "True Believer"
- True Believers (Darius Rucker album), 2013
- True Believers (John Schumann album), 1993
- True Believer (Matthew Barber album)

=== Songs ===
- "True Believer" (song), a 2007 song by E-Type
- "True Believers" (song), by Darius Rucker
- "True Believer", by Avicii from Stories
- "True Believer", by Beast in Black from From Hell with Love
- "True Believer", by Domine from Emperor of the Black Runes
- "True Believer", by Dragonette from Galore
- "True Believer", by Hayley Williams from Ego Death at a Bachelorette Party
- "True Believer", by Hoobastank from Push Pull
- "True Believer", by Lillian Axe from Poetic Justice
- "True Believer", by Lionel Cartwright from I Watched It on the Radio
- "True Believer", by Raven from Glow
- "True Believer", by Testament from The Gathering
- "True Believers", by the Black Angels from Phosphene Dream
- "True Believers", by The Cult from Beyond Good and Evil
- "True Believers", by The Bouncing Souls from How I Spent My Summer Vacation
- "True Belief", by Paradise Lost from Icon

=== Performers ===
- True Believers (band), a 1980s American rock band from Texas led by Alejandro Escovedo and Jon Dee Graham
- Carus and The True Believers, an Australian band
