= We Believe: Chicago and Its Cubs =

We Believe: Chicago and its Cubs
- Directed by: John Scheinfeld
- Release date: 2009

We Believe: Chicago and its Cubs is a 2009 documentary film about the city of Chicago and her enduring love for the Chicago Cubs directed by John Scheinfeld (The U.S. vs. John Lennon). It was scheduled to be released into theaters during the spring of 2009.

== Cast ==
Appearing in the film are nine current players and celebrities like Lou Piniella, Hugh Hefner, Billy Corgan, Ernie Banks, Joe Mantegna and Ron Santo.

The film was set to be released in theaters and as a DVD in Spring 2010
