= Sarnath Banerjee =

Indian artist

- Born: 1972 (age 53–54) Calcutta, India
- Areas: Writer, Penciller, Artist
- Notable works: Corridor; The Barn Owl's Wondrous Capers

Sarnath Banerjee (born 1972) is an Indian graphic novelist, artist, filmmaker and co-founder of the comics publishing house, Phantomville.

== Biography ==
Banerjee was born in Calcutta and lives and works in Delhi, India. He studied image and communication at Goldsmiths College, University of London.

His first novel, Corridor (2004), published by Penguin Books, India, was commissioned as a part of a fellowship awarded by the MacArthur Foundation, Chicago and marketed as India's first graphic novel. However, River of Stories, a graphic novel by Orijit Sen published in 1994, actually holds this honor. His second novel, The Barn Owl's Wondrous Capers, was published in 2007.

Sarnath has also provided illustrations for novels by other authors. He designed the cover for Upamanyu Chatterjee's novel, Weight Loss.

== Gallery of Losers ==
Sarnath's project, the Gallery of losers, was on display on billboards across the six Olympic Host Boroughs in East London. According to him, he came across the idea in São Paulo, Brazil, where he met 1984 Olympics silver medalist Douglas Vierra who almost won the judo gold that year. The Frieze Foundation has said that the work "taps into a collective consciousness of sporting near misses - the people who almost made it - and aims to resonate with both local communities and visitors to the London games".

== Themes ==
Sarnath's graphic works often center on everyday Indian experiences. Often anecdotal and autobiographical in nature, they are imbued with a rich, distinctive sense of humor. Banerjee describes himself as a recorder of a rapidly changing India. A theme that runs strongly in his work is the loss of architecture and history that comes with a developing country's reach for modernisation.

== Bibliography ==
=== Graphic novels ===
- Corridor (Penguin Books, 2004)
- The Barn Owl's Wondrous Capers (Penguin Books, 2007, ISBN 0-14-400108-X)
- The Harappa Files (HarperCollins, 2011, ISBN 978-93-5029-031-6|)
- All Quiet In Vikaspuri (HarperCollins, 2016, ISBN 978-9351775744|)
- Doab Dil (Penguin Books, 2019)
