= Emily Maguire (singer) =

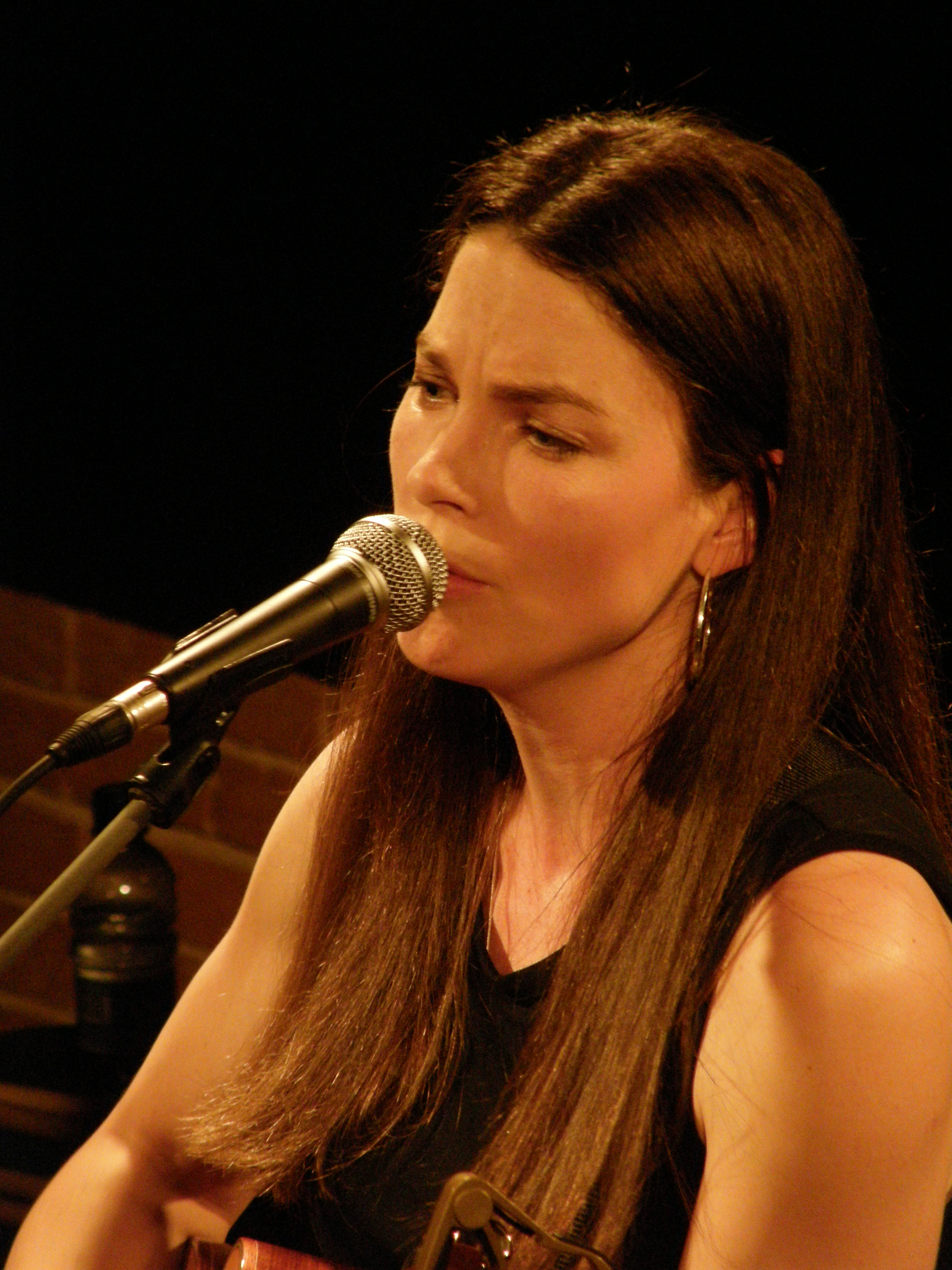
- Emily Maguire performing at The Brook, Southampton, England in June 2008

Background information
- Born: Emily Lucy Maguire; 8 March 1975 (age 50)
- Origin: London, England
- Genres: Alternative / acoustic / indie rock
- Occupation: Singer-songwriter
- Instrument(s): Vocals, acoustic guitar, cello, piano, recorder, flute
- Years active: 2003–present
- Labels: Shaktu Records (self released)
- Website: emilymaguire.com

Emily Lucy Maguire (born 8 March 1975) is an English singer-songwriter. She has released five albums to date which are distributed through Universal by Active Media. All the songs apart from one cover version are written and composed by Maguire. She has also released two books, containing a mix of poetry, prose, song lyrics and diary entries. Maguire runs her own record label Shaktu Records with her husband Christian Dunham.

== Biography ==
Maguire was born in South London, but most of her childhood was spent in Cambridge, England. She grew up without a TV at home and developed a passion for books and music, learning to play the cello, piano, flute and recorder from a very early age. Her father initially got her playing the piano which led to a love for classical music. She was raised with the music of Bach and Mozart. At age 12 Maguire looked destined to become a professional cellist. She played in competitions, attended courses on chamber music, and took a master class with cellist Paul Tortelier.

When she was 17, she was involved in a car crash and a whiplash injury triggered fibromyalgia, a condition that affects the nervous system and results in chronic pain. The condition affected her mobility for several years and by the time she was 21 she had to give up her job and was on walking sticks, sometimes completely housebound.

During this period she taught herself to play Bob Marley songs on the guitar and started writing her own songs inspired by his music. She wrote hundreds of songs in her bedroom and purchased a ProTools Studio to start recording them at home on a computer. By her mid 20s, her health had improved and she moved back to London, and started working again doing office jobs. To begin with, Maguire did not see herself as a performer, but eventually began singing her songs in open-mic clubs.

In 2003 she went to stay with Christian Dunham in the Obi Obi valley up in the hills behind the Sunshine Coast in Queensland, Australia. Dunham plays bass guitar and was a member of an Australian rock band. They later married, and together they produced her album in a recording studio next to their house, a shack with no heating, built from old bits of timber and metal with walls made from rendered potato sacks. Mice live in Maguire's piano, and Huntsman spiders live in the bathroom. Maguire overcame a snake phobia by giving a 7 ft python, who moved into the shack from neighbouring farmland, the name "Dudley".

Maguire recorded her debut album, Stranger Place, over 14 days and nights at the shack. She and Dunham set up their own record label – Shaktu Records, named after the shack. They took over the family cheese-making business in order to fund the album independently. Proceeds were raised by the manufacture and selling of goats cheese. In 2006, after completing another tour of the UK, the couple returned to Australia to record her second album, Keep Walking. In July 2007 they returned to the UK to play the Cambridge Folk Festival and embark on a three-month tour of pubs and clubs before heading back to life on the farm.

On 9 September 2007 she was featured as a Sunday Spotlight artist on Aled Jones' Good Morning Sunday show on BBC Radio 2, and her song "Back Home", from the album Keep Walking, was played. The manager of The Waterboys heard it and phoned Maguire to offer her a 16-date tour of Ireland with American singer Don McLean, culminating in a show at the Royal Albert Hall in London. This story led to several articles appearing in the press, including one in The Guardian on 21 November 2007, titled "My Wildlife", and one in The Sydney Morning Herald, 15 November 2007, titled "Valley girl seduces London", as well as several live radio interviews on national radio in the UK.

On 16 October 2008 Maguire played her first major headline gig at The Bush Hall in London performing her songs with an all-girl string trio from The Royal Academy of Music plus Damon Wilson, the drummer from The Waterboys. Her third album, Believer, was released in November 2009. Maguire puts her classical training and cello-playing to use, writing and recording all the string arrangements for all her albums. On her MySpace page she cites Bach, Bob Marley and Buddha as her influences. A practising Buddhist for over 10 years, her albums are dedicated to her teacher Lama Jampa Thaye

Maguire released her first book titled Start Over Again on 1 October 2010. It contains a brief autobiography and is based on the verses of her song "Start Over Again" (from her third album, Believer). It includes her poetry, prose, song lyrics and personal diary entries that offer an insight into the creativity of a manic depressive mind. She wrote about her tough battle with chronic depression and bi-polar disorder.

On 15 July 2013, she released her fourth studio album, Bird Inside a Cage.

After a period of 18 months where she was unable to play her instruments due to chronic tendonitis, she started touring again in late 2016, and in February 2017 released her fifth studio album, A Bit of Blue. This album was once again part-financed through a fan-funding campaign, and was launched at a special gig at St Pancras Old Church, London, on 24 February 2017.

== Musical career ==
=== Stranger Place ===
This is Maguire's self-produced acoustic folk-pop debut album. It contains 12 tracks, ten of which were recorded at Pix Records in Queensland and two at Goldcrest studios in London. It was released in 2004. An album made up of questioning lyrics and musical imagery, with dark tones on album opener "The Real World" to lighter shades on "Stranger Place". On "Falling on My Feet" she sings of devotion and on "I Turned on the News" about the slow decay of society. "The Real World" secured her an invitation to perform at the 2005 Singer-Songwriter Festival at The Borderline in London, where she opened for David Bowie's bassist Gail Ann Dorsey.

=== Keep Walking ===
Released in 2007, Maguire's 12 track second album combines her love of classical music with a passion for beats, bass lines and acoustic guitar. The title track was released as a single and gained a place on the BBC Radio 2 playlist during May and June in 2008.

=== Believer ===
Maguire's third album was recorded at Kore Studios, Chiswick, London in January 2009 and released on 16 November 2009. This included two new singles "Lighthouse Man" and "I'd Rather Be". Both were playlisted on BBC Radio 2, the former appearing on the "C" list and the latter securing a "B" list placing for five weeks. The third single released was "Anything You Do".

=== Bird Inside a Cage ===
Maguire's fourth studio album was produced by Nigel Butler and released on Monday 15 July 2013. The album launch took place with a concert held at Hoxton Hall in London on Friday 12 July 2013. The fan funded 10 track project contains the first single "Beautiful". The title track "Bird Inside a Cage" was written about The Times magazine columnist Melanie Reid who broke her neck and back after falling from a horse in April 2010. She was inspired by an article Reid had written in 2011, on the first anniversary of her accident.

She was a studio guest and was interviewed by Clare Balding on BBC Radio 2's Good Morning Sunday show on 14 July 2013. The first single was played and she performed a live acoustic version of her love song "North and South".

=== A Bit of Blue ===
Maguire's fifth studio album was produced by Nigel Butler and released in February 2017. The album launch took place at a gig in St Pancras Old Church in London on Friday 24 February 2017. Maguire then embarked on a 12 date UK tour, with additional charity gigs and sessions in mental health hospitals.

=== Singles ===
Year	Single	Peak positions	Album
Year	Single	Official UK Singles Chart	Album
2008	"Keep Walking"	—	"Keep Walking"
2009	"Lighthouse Man"	—	"Believer"
2010	"I'd Rather Be"	—	"Believer"
2010	"Anything You Do"	—	"Believer"
2013	"Beautiful"	—	"Bird Inside A Cage"
"—" denotes releases that did not chart

== Festivals ==
- Maguire played the Cambridge Folk Festival on 26 July 2007 and was interviewed for BBC Radio Cambridgeshire.
- On 28 June she played the Acoustic Stage at The Glastonbury Festival 2008 joined by drummer Geoff Dugmore and bass player Christian Dunham.

== Tours ==
- 4–26 October 2007: support act for American singer-songwriter Don Mclean
- 27 May – 26 June 2008: support act for blues singer songwriter Eric Bibb
- 9–15 July 2008: support act for adult alternative/pop band The Blue Nile
- 12–29 October 2008: support act for musician and singer songwriter Glenn Tilbrook
- 6–20 November 2008: support act for musician and singer songwriter Roddy Frame
- 14 January – 25 February 2010: Maguire was Artist of the Month for the Caffe Nero chain and toured as a solo artist at their different establishments around the UK.

== Live radio appearances ==
- Aled Jones Good Morning Sunday, BBC Radio 2, 7 October 2007. Maguire joined the show live on the phone. She spoke about opening for Don Mclean on his UK tour and the forthcoming show at The Royal Albert Hall on 26 October.
- Aled Jones Good Morning Sunday, BBC Radio 2, 28 October 2007. As a live studio guest Maguire spoke of the impact of her experience after finishing her UK tour with Don Mclean. She discussed her discovery and practice of the Buddhist faith which inspired her music. Her songs "Keep Walking" and "Falling on My Feet" and were played. The latter being the closest to her heart about hope and faith following heartbreak. The song became something of a premonition when a few weeks later she went to Australia for a holiday and it changed her life.
- Bob Harris, BBC Radio 2, 11 November 2007. Maguire along with bass player Christian Dunham performed three songs live: "Stranger Place", "Anything You Do" and "All That You Wanted". Presenter Gideon Coe standing in for Bob Harris ended the session by playing the title track from the album Keep Walking.
- Woman's Hour, BBC Radio 4, 17 December 2007. Maguire discussed her life story to date (The goats cheese maker whose played the Albert Hall) with presenter Jane Garvey. Maguire's song "All That You Wanted" was played and she performed "Falling on My Feet" live.
- Aled Jones Good Morning Sunday, BBC Radio 2, 20 January 2008. Maguire joined the programme as their Buddhist guest from the BBC radio studios in London. She spoke of the importance of her faith and how it was tested following a burglary shortly after Christmas. Maguire's new single "All That You Wanted" was played followed by a discussion of the legacy of Martin Luther King Jr., as the US holiday of Martin Luther King Jr. Day was marked on 21 January 2008. For the Moment of Reflection feature, and with King in mind, Maguire read from William Ernest Henley's poem Invictus.
- Aled Jones Good Morning Sunday, BBC Radio 2, 25 May 2008. Maguire spoke about climate neutral living and how her song had been selected for World Environment Day. The Environment program for the United Nations is based in Kenya and a lady in the office Nairobi heard about her low-carbon lifestyle story living in a recycled shack in the Australian Bush. Maguire's song "Somewhere in the Blue" was played, inspired by the book The Bridges of Madison County.She then spoke about meeting her Buddhist teacher Lama Jampa Thaye in London and going to see the Dalai Lama speak publicly a few days earlier at the Royal Albert Hall on 22 May 2008. Maguire was about to embark on a UK tour with bluesman Eric Bibb and they met for the first time, live on air in the studio. Maguire then read the Moment of Reflection drawing from words from her song "The Borderline" and her thoughts on what Buddhism has taught her and how people are interconnected.
- Loose Ends, BBC Radio 4, 6 July 2008. Maguire was a guest performing an acoustic version of "Keep Walking" live in the studio.
- Aled Jones Good Morning Sunday, BBC Radio 2, 31 January 2010. Maguire spoke about song writing and performed her song "Start Over Again" live from new album Believer accompanied by bassist and husband Christian Dunham. Maguire discussed her experiences of life in how she was drawn to Buddhism, her reliance for guidance from her teacher and how studying the faith had helped her to take control of stressful situations. She articulated in how music and her faith are intertwined. Her songs and lyrics are informed by her Buddhist philosophy view of the world, she writes after meditation. The title of the album Believer is her expression of the themes of love, passion and the power of faith she found.
- Clare Balding Good Morning Sunday, BBC Radio 2, 14 July 2013. As a live studio guest, Maguire performed an acoustic version of her song "North and South" and spoke about the reality of relationships and her experience of living in the Australian Bush for four years.
