= The Barn Owl's Wondrous Capers =

2007 graphic novel by Sarnath Banerjee

- Author: Sarnath Banerjee
- Illustrator: Sarnath Banerjee
- Cover artist: Chandan Crasta
- Language: English
- Genre: Graphic novel
- Publisher: Penguin Books (India)
- Publication date: January 2007
- Publication place: India
- Media type: Print (Paperback)
- Pages: 280 pp
- ISBN: 0-14-400108-X
- OCLC: 123767962
- LC Class: MLCM 2007/00163 (P) PR9499.3.B

The Barn Owl's Wondrous Capers is a 2007 graphic novel by Indian graphic artist Sarnath Banerjee. It is the author's second graphic novel after Corridor, which has been widely advertised as the first Indian graphic novel.

== Plot summary ==
The graphic novel gives an insight into Kolkata's babu culture, both historic and modern-day

The novel reinvents the legend of The Wandering Jew as a Jewish merchant called Abravanel Ben Obadiah Ben Aharon Kabariti who once lived in 18th century Kolkata (Calcutta) and who recorded the scandalous affairs of its British administrators in a book called The Barn Owl's Wondrous Capers. Although it has several subplots, at its core the novel is about the narrator's quest to find this book, which his grandfather Pablo Chatterjee found at an old Jewish trinket shop in Montmartre, Paris, in the 1950s. Pablo's wife gave away the book, as well as her husband's other belongings, upon his death; the narrator tries to recover the book, which was one of his childhood favorites.

The title of the graphic novel is the English translation of Hutum Pyanchar Noksha, a 19th-century Bengali novel written by Kaliprasanna Singha. It was originally published as a series and later in novel form in two parts (1862 and 1864).

== Main characters ==
- Narrator: A young man of about thirty, and the protagonist.
- Pablo: The narrator's deceased grandfather appears as a spirit from time to time, encouraging him to find the book. He had worked for Indian Railways for 35 years and had in fact serendipitously discovered "The Barn Owl's Wondrous Capers" in Paris while attending an international conference on broad gauge railways.
- Digital Dutta: A character from Banerjee's first novel Corridor, Digital is a computer engineer living in Kolkata. He befriends the narrator and also encourages him to find the book.
- Kedar Babu: A babu or clerk at Writers' Building, Kolkata, and an amateur occultist, he aids the narrator by creating a "psychic map" for him to follow if he wants to find the book.
- Mandar Dey: An aristocratic Bengali cheating on his wife, he is one of several possibles to have taken the book. While at Mandar's home, the narrator is treated to a history of babu-dom in the Dey clan.
- The Wandering Jew: He takes several guises in the novel — a mystic in the 15th century, a French lord in the 16th or the Jewish merchant Abravanel in 18th century Kolkata. As Abravanel, he supplies the Kolkata elite, both British and Indian, goods like corsets, aphrodisiacs and even zebras; his connections give him material for his book.
