= Fire and Blood (Manowar DVD) =

Video by Manowar
- Released: December 2, 2002
- Genre: Heavy metal, power metal
- Length: 275 minutes
- Label: Steamhammer SPV
- Producer: Neil Johnson

Manowar chronology
Hell on Earth I (2000)	Fire and Blood (2002)	Hell on Earth III (2003)

Fire and Blood is a double-DVD from American heavy metal band Manowar. The first DVD is a documentary that features part 2 of the series "Hell on Earth". With almost two hours of running time "Hell on Earth Part 2" documents the 1998 "Hell on Stage" European Tour with almost 30 shows. The second DVD, Blood in Brazil is their live performance at the Philips Monsters Of Rock in São Paulo, Brazil on September 26, 1998. This was the first a complete concert performance captured in the band's career.

== Blood in Brazil track listing ==
1. Intro
2. Manowar
3. Metal Daze
4. Blood Of My Enemies
5. Kill With Power
6. Sign Of The Hammer
7. Gates Of Valhalla
8. Sting Of The Bumblebee
9. The Gods Made Heavy Metal
10. Metal Warriors
11. Kings Of Metal
12. The Power
13. Hail And Kill
14. Black Wind, Fire And Steel
15. The Crown And The Ring (Lament Of The Kings)

== Hell On Earth Part II chapter ==
1. This Is Heavy Metal
2. Blood Of The Kings
3. France
4. Voulez Vous
5. Belgium
6. Bridge Of Death
7. Switzerland
8. Guyana (Cult Of The Damned)
9. Germany Part I
10. Hatred
11. Germany Part II
12. March For Revenge (By The Soldiers Of Death)
13. Germany Part III
14. The Gods Made Heavy Metal
15. Czech Republic
16. Army Of The Immortals
17. Austria
18. Hungary
19. Master Of The Wind
20. Portugal
21. Dark Avenger
22. Spain
23. Battle Hymn
24. The Crown And The Ring (Lament Of The Kings)
