= Corridor (comics) =

Graphic novel by Sarnath Banerjee

Publication information
- Publisher: Penguin Group(India)
- Publication date: 2004
- Main character(s): Jehangir Rangoonwalla; Brighu; Digital Dutta; Shintu

Creative team
- Written by: Sarnath Banerjee
- Artist: Sarnath Banerjee

Corridor is an Indian graphic novel, written and illustrated by Sarnath Banerjee, set in contemporary Delhi. A shop owner by the name of Jehangir Rangoonwalla interacts with other residents of Delhi visiting his shop.

== Plot summary ==
In the heart of Lutyens' Delhi sits Jehangir Rangoonwalla, enlightened dispenser of tea, wisdom and second-hand books. Among his customers are Brighu, a postmodern Ibn Batuta looking for obscure collectibles and a love life; Digital Dutta who lives mostly in his head, torn between Karl Marx and an H-1B visa; and the newly married Shintu, looking for the ultimate aphrodisiac in the seedy by-lanes of old Delhi. Played out in the corridors of Connaught Place and Calcutta, the story captures the alienation and fragmented reality of urban life through an imaginative alchemy of text and image.

Opening with narration from Brighu, Sarnath Banerjee takes the reader through a snapshot of the lives of multiple people living in Delhi all searching for a perfect solution for an issue they are trying to solve. Jehangir Rangoonwalla has already had his moment of enlightenment and has taken it upon himself to share with other characters that visit him throughout the book. As Brighu covers the stories of the other characters and returns to himself, he describes how his girlfriend Kali finally decided to leave him. He comes to the conclusion that meetings between people must be cosmic accidents that don’t happen often but special things must have happened when they do.

== Characters ==
- Jehangir Rangoonwalla: A bookstore owner who sees himself as living near the center of the universe in Connaught Place. Rangoonwalla has found peace selling Ikea Catalogues and other goods at his store. Believing that wisdom should come smoothly, Rangoonwalla now tells others about his trip in an elevator decades ago when he came to the sudden realization that “It all comes down to chewing your food well”.
- Brighu: A stubborn collector who will refuse to finish reading a series of books if one is missing. Brighu finds himself in Rangoonwalla’s bookstore searching for a book, being mildly disappointed when Rangoonwalla doesn’t have it. Brighu is also the beginning narrator of the book, commenting on the heat in Delhi before explaining his various collections.
- Digital Dutta: A Marxist computer engineer stressing about obtaining an H-1B visa. Dutta and his girlfriend Dolly are in a park when they are approached by 4 goons that Dutta fights off after one makes a comment about Dutta’s mother. After being bitten by a malaria-ridden mosquito, Dutta continues to struggle matching expectations in his head and reality.
- Shintu: A newly married man who believes he has sexual problems he wants to get rid of, Shintu goes off in search of a powerful aphrodisiac to remedy his situation. When his expensive remedy is accidentally switched with hair oil by the maid, Shintu realizes that his sexual shortcomings were all in his head.
- DVD Murthy: A surgeon who has been around the smell of dead and decaying bodies for decades. Murthy is looking for a way to hide the smell he has absorbed over the years. Even his daughter runs away from the smell, leading to Murthy to turn to a strong perfume that finally helps cover up his smell.

== Themes ==
Sarnath Banerjee highlights the vast differences between people’s lives in Delhi even as they all pursue solutions/conclusions for their problems. Even a character like Brighu who is observant and aware of his surroundings struggles in his relationship with Kali and ultimately loses her. But he finds himself compiling the images of the other characters in the story he had drawn, seeming to find his calling as an artist even though he hadn’t initially pursued that course. Throughout the disorder of Delhi and city life as a whole that is emphasized in Corridor, Banerjee demonstrates that peace could still be found by each of the characters even if they hadn’t explicitly searched it out as Shintu and DVD Murthy had. Digital Dutta finds it difficult to cope with the contrast between his dreams and his reality. Getting into a Bollywood-style brawl as it is retold later when protecting his girlfriend leaving the reader to question how extraordinary the fight really was.

== See also ==
- Sarnath Banerjee (Author)
- Indian comics
- The Barn Owl's Wondrous Capers, Sarnath Banerjee's second graphic novel
