= The Believers: Stories from Jewish Havana =

- Directed by: Bonnie Burt
- Release date: 1994
- Running time: 14 minutes
- Country: United States
- Language: English

The Believers: Stories From Jewish Havana is a 1994 short documentary film directed by American Bonnie Burt. It explores the lives of a variety of Jews during the early post–Cold War years in the Cuban capital city, a time of material shortages and religious rebirth.

== Summary ==
The film shows how political turbulence can sometimes open opportunities. For Jews living in Cuba, the collapse of the Soviet Union and their island government's changing opinion of religion. Despite the material shortages created by the end of Soviet support to Cuba, the end of the years of plenty is also an end to the enforced religious vacuum—a vacuum now being filled by “reborn” Jews.

In 1959, at the dawn of communist rule, there were roughly 15,000 Jews living in Havana. Some 94% of the Jews joined the emigration of other middle-class and upper class Cubans, settling in the United States and other countries. By 2007, there were 1500 Jews in Cuba, with 1100 of them in Havana.

The fall of communism in Russia in 1990 triggered an era that Cubans call the “Special Period.” During this time, communist party membership requirements regarding religious belief were gradually relaxed. Seeing this ideological opening, the American Jewish Joint Distribution Committee began sending religious materials and advisers to Cuba in an attempt to reinvigorate a fading community of less than 1,400 Jews.

Burt journeys to Havana to interview local Jews in 1994, five years into the Special Period. She films excited activity over the local rebirth of the faith, but also the daily hardships of life under a national economy on the brink of collapse. A halt in Soviet material subsidies means that food, gasoline, electricity and medicine are all scarce. Burt's subjects were candid about the negative effects caused by these shortages.

Burt documents a religious optimism among a group of Jews re-learning their faith. The director captures images of Friday night worship where, despite lack of gasoline for buses and cars, the faithful travel from far and wide to pray at Havana's handful of synagogues. They pray, dance and sing songs, living the humble lives of believers.
