= List of songs recorded by Alyssa Milano =

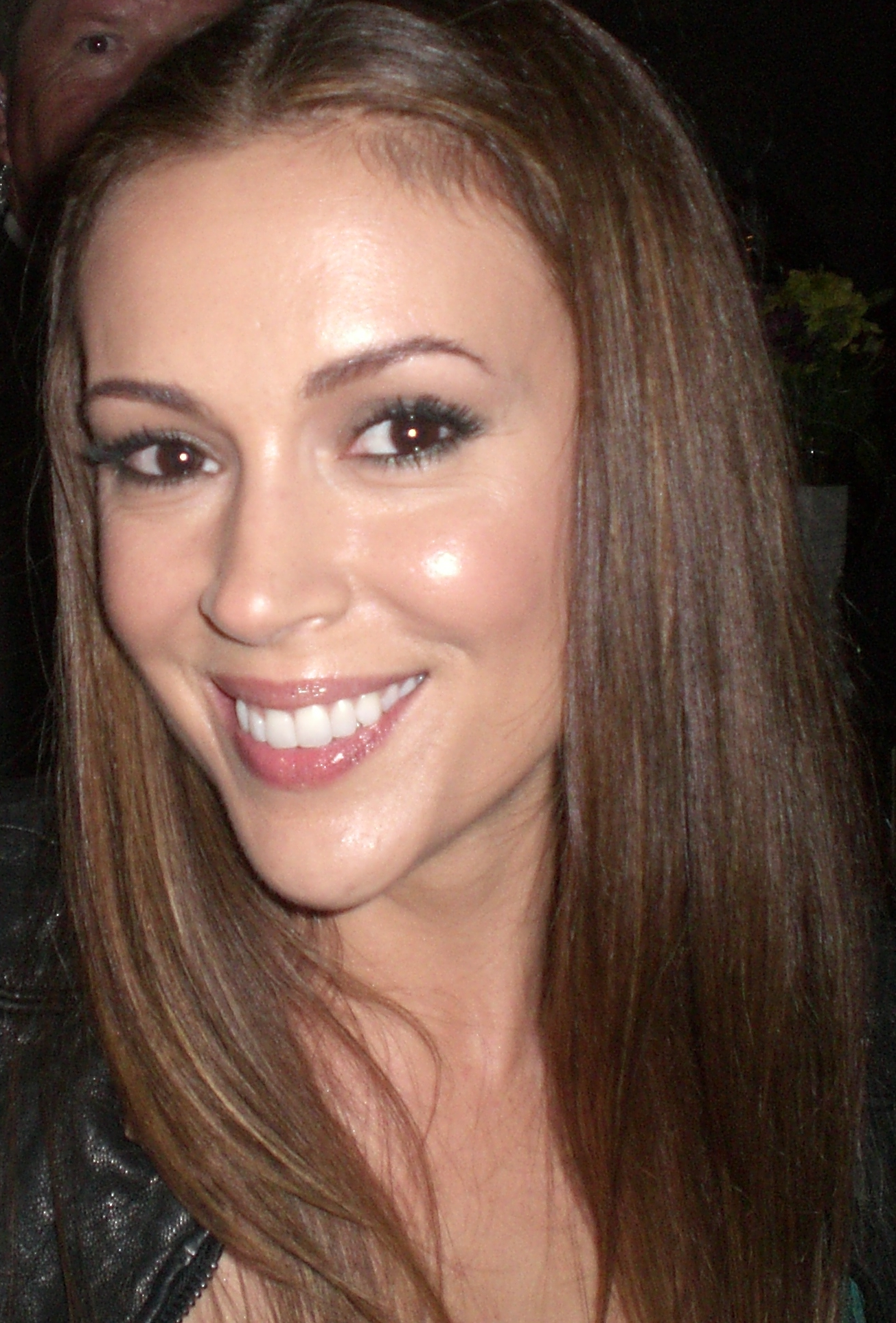
Milano attending the premiere of Beverly Hills Chihuahua in Los Angeles, California, September 2008

American actress and singer Alyssa Milano has recorded songs for four studio albums, two compilation albums, and an exercise video. She first came to prominence within the entertainment industry for her portrayal of Samantha Micelli in the television sitcom Who's the Boss?, which premiered in September 1984. While acting on the television series, she recorded and released music exclusively in Japan through the Japanese record label Pony Canyon, Inc. Pony Canyon, Inc. signed Milano to a five-album deal based on her appearance and personality, which was a common practice by Japanese record labels in their efforts to produce Japanese idols. The label also choose Milano due to her popularity in Asia from her role as Jenny Matrix in the 1985 film Commando. Throughout her musical career, Milano had little involvement with the songwriting and production of her albums. She did not express any interest in releasing her music in the United States, and said: "A lot of actors who release albums here are laughed at, I'm not interested in crossing over. I'd much rather have it released where it's appreciated than laughed at."

Prior to the release of her first album, Milano appeared in Japanese advertisements for pasta and chocolate milk; the jingles from the advertisements were written by producer Joey Carbone, and were later included on Milano's albums and released as singles. Milano's debut studio album Look in My Heart was released in March 1989, and peaked at number 68 on the Oricon Albums Chart. Milano's music incorporated prominent elements of bubblegum pop and dance-pop. Carbone was responsible for much of the album's songwriting and production, and Milano's father also contributed as co-writer of three songs. Prior to the release of her debut album, Milano released an exercise video, titled Alyssa Milano's Teen Steam, and recorded its theme song along with a rap. Milano's rap was written by producers Jason Hervey and Ryan Lambert. Milano's second studio album Alyssa was released later that year, peaked at number 15 on the Oricon Albums Chart and was certified platinum. A majority of the songwriters and producers from Look in My Heart handled the creation of its follow-up album, for which Milano earned her first songwriting credit as co-writer of "We Need the Children".

The following year, Milano released her first compilation album, The Best in the World: Non-Stop Special Remix/Alyssa's Singles, which included one new song, "The Best in the World". In 1991, Milano contributed to the charity single "Voices That Care" as one of the choir members. The record was followed by Milano's third studio album Locked Inside a Dream in May 1991. The album featured Milano singing and rapping about more mature subject matter. Milano again collaborated with her father and Carbone during its production. Production duo Jamey Jaz and Ren Toppano also served as songwriters and producers on the record, with their work being compared to the collaborations between Oliver Leiber and Paula Abdul. Milano's fourth studio album Do You See Me? was released in May 1992, and was the first record of hers not produced by Carbone. The album was described as having a more "mellow, sophisticated" style, and incorporating "slightly funkier twists" and "pop/hip-hop" sounds. Milano's final record was her second compilation album, The Very Best of Alyssa Milano, released in January 1995, which included one new song, "I Love When We're Together". In May 2013, Milano said that she had not returned to Japan since the end of her music career.

== Songs ==
Key
†	Indicates single release

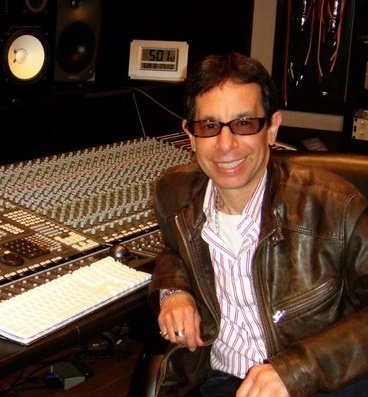
Joey Carbone (pictured) co-wrote several songs for Alyssa Milano's first three studio albums.

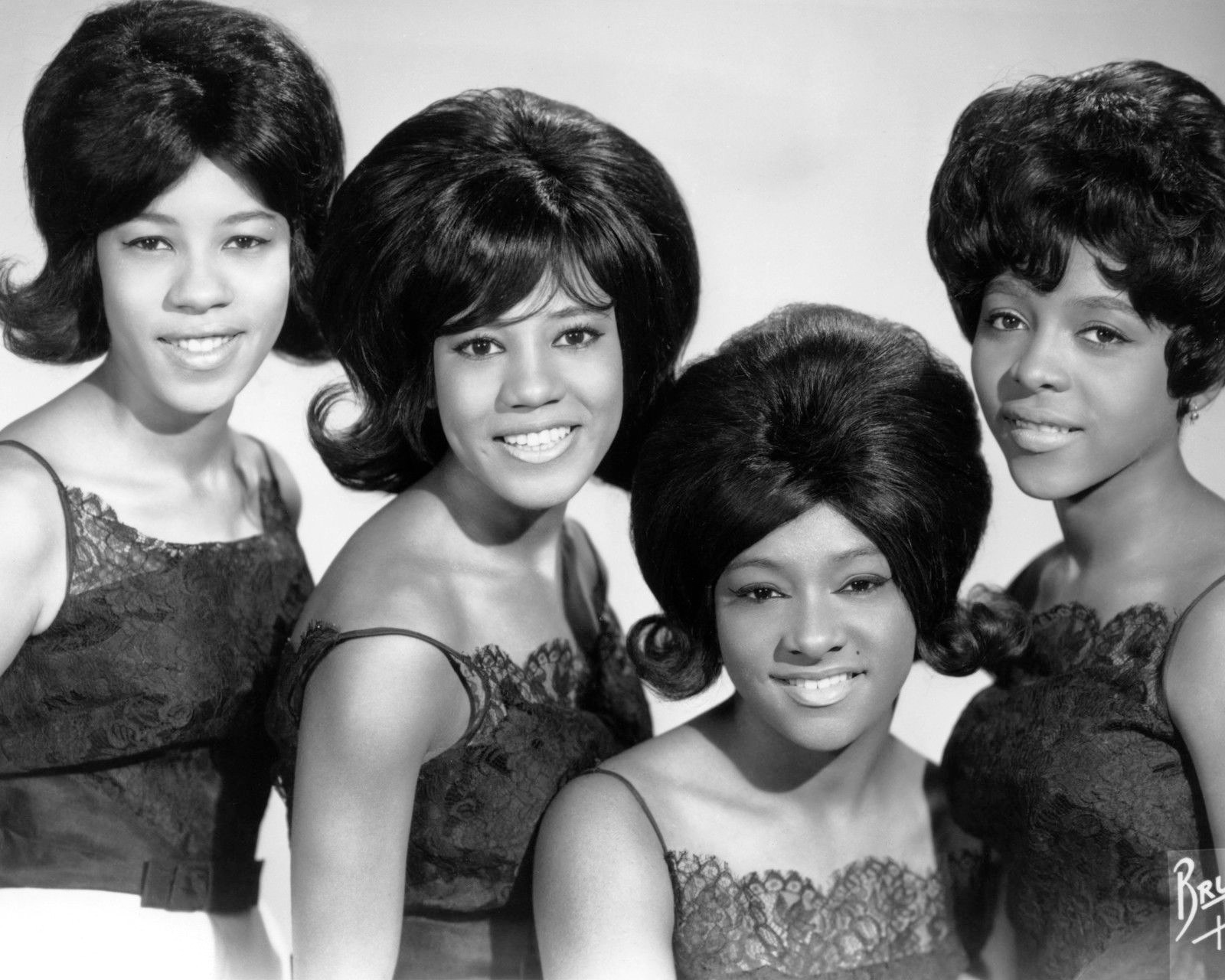
Milano recorded a cover of "Da Doo Ron Ron", originally performed by The Crystals (pictured), as a part of a medley for Look in My Heart.

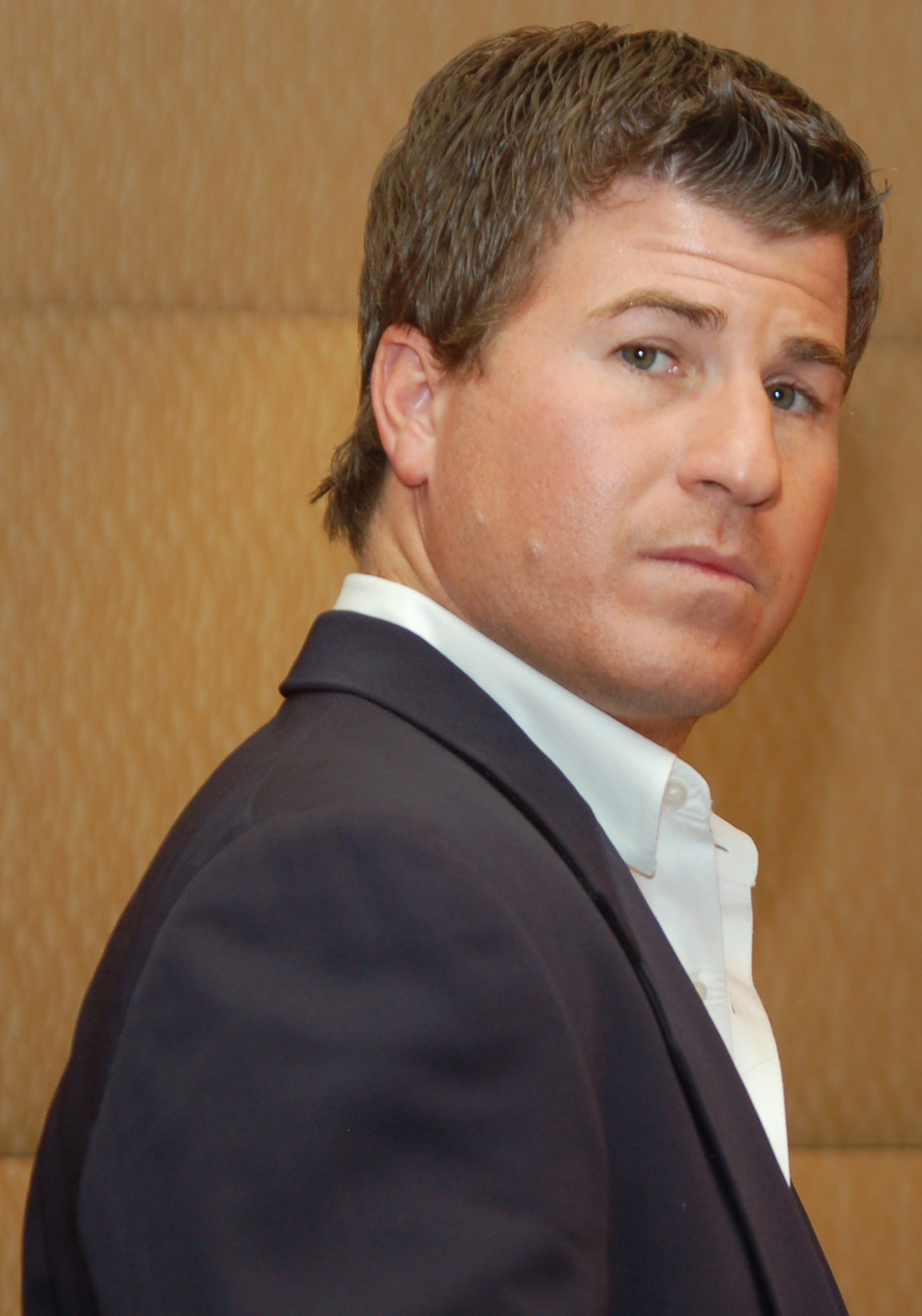
Jason Hervey (pictured) worked with Milano on "Rap" from her exercise video Alyssa Milano's Teen Steam.

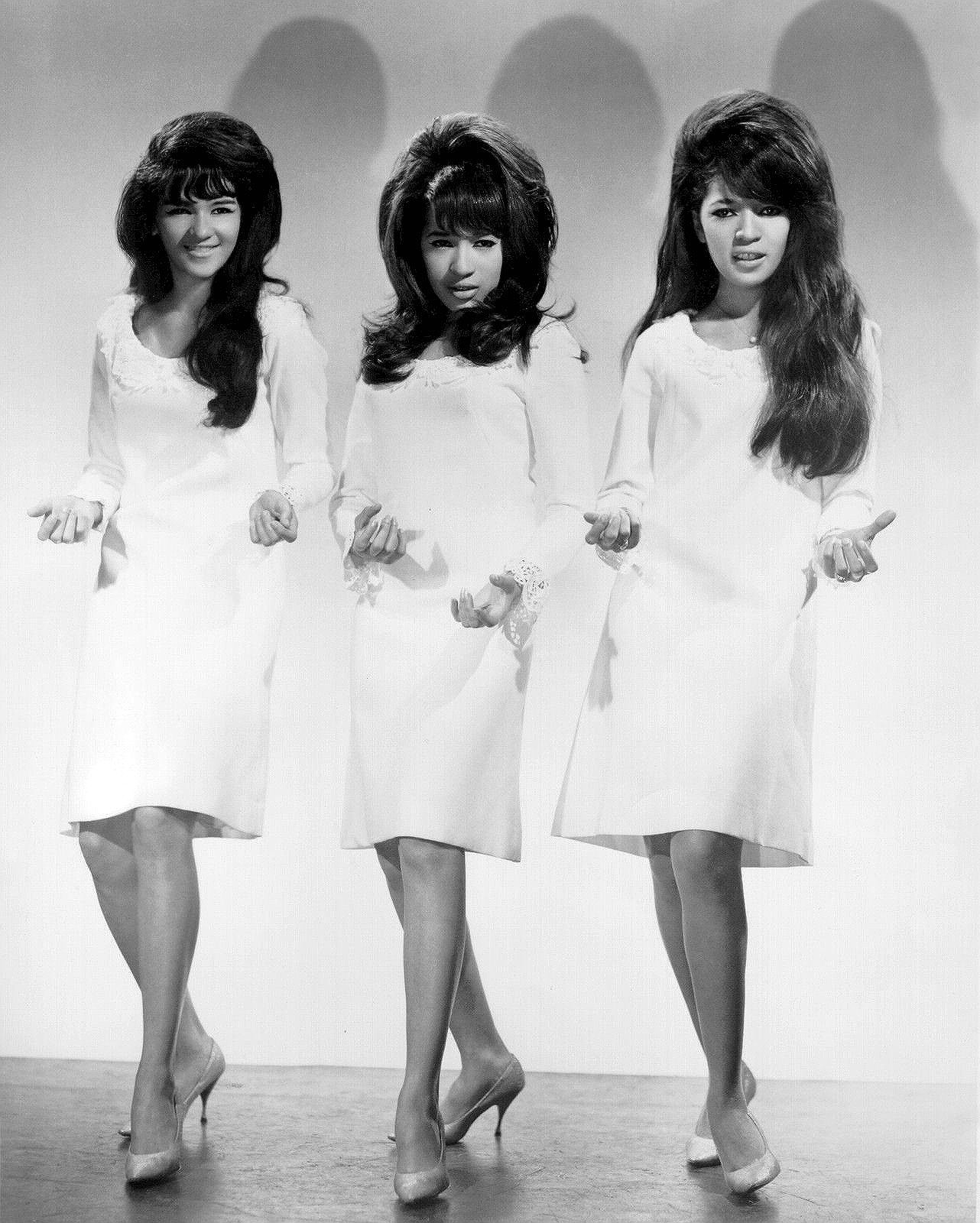
Milano recorded a cover of "Be My Baby", originally performed by The Ronettes (pictured), as a part of a medley for Alyssa.

Name of song, featured performers, writer(s), original release, and year of release
Song	Artist(s)	Writer(s)	Album(s)	Year	Ref.
"Be My Baby/Tell Me That You Love Me – Medley"	Alyssa Milano	Jeff Barry; Phil Spector; Ellie Greenwich; Joey Carbone; Tom Milano	Alyssa	1989	
"The Best in the World" †	Alyssa Milano	Joey Carbone; Dennis Belfield	The Best in the World: Non-Stop Special Remix/Alyssa's Singles	1990	
"Born to Love"	Alyssa Milano	Fonny De Wulf	Look in My Heart	1989	
"Can You Feel It"	Alyssa Milano	Joey Carbone; Tom Milano	Alyssa	1989	
"Care for Kids" †	Children Of The World Project	—N/a	We Are The World, We Are The Children	1985	
"Closer to You"	Alyssa Milano	Jamey Jaz; Ren Toppano; Alyssa Milano	Locked Inside a Dream	1991	
"Count on Me"	Alyssa Milano	Joey Carbone; Dennis Belfield	Locked Inside a Dream	1991	
"Da Doo Ron Ron/Magic in Your Eyes – Medley"	Alyssa Milano	Jeff Barry; Phil Spector; Ellie Greenwich; Joey Carbone; Tom Milano	Look in My Heart	1989	
"Destiny"	Alyssa Milano	Joey Carbone	Alyssa	1989	
"Do You See Me?" †	Alyssa Milano	Tom Milano; Charles M. Inouye	Do You See Me?	1992	
"Every Single Kiss"	Alyssa Milano	Tom Milano; Charles M. Inouye	Locked Inside a Dream	1991	
"Everything You Do"	Alyssa Milano	Tom Milano; Charles M. Inouye	Do You See Me?	1992	
"Give a Little Kindness"	Alyssa Milano	Joey Carbone; Tom Milano	Alyssa	1989	
"Happiness" †	Alyssa Milano	Joey Carbone; Tom Milano; Mark Davis	Alyssa	1989	
"If Only"	Alyssa Milano	Jamey Jaz; Ren Toppano	Do You See Me?	1992	
"I Had a Dream" †	Alyssa Milano	Joey Carbone; Dennis Belfield	Alyssa	1989	
"I Just Wanna Be Loved"	Alyssa Milano	Joey Carbone; Dennis Belfield	Alyssa	1989	
"I Love When We're Together" †	Alyssa Milano	Joey Carbone; Dennis Belfield	The Very Best of Alyssa Milano	1995	
"I Want Your Number"	Alyssa Milano	Jamey Jaz; Ren Toppano	Locked Inside a Dream	1991	
"Kimi Wa Sunshine Boy"	Alyssa Milano	Brian Richy; Mark Davis	Look in My Heart	1989	
"Let My Love Show You"	Alyssa Milano	Tom Milano; Gary Mallaber	Alyssa	1989	
"Locked Inside a Dream"	Alyssa Milano	Tom Milano; Charles M. Inouye	Locked Inside a Dream	1991	
"Look in My Heart" †	Alyssa Milano	Joey Carbone; Dennis Belfield	Look in My Heart	1989	
"New Sensation" †	Alyssa Milano	Joey Carbone; Jeff Carruthers	Locked Inside a Dream	1991	
"No Secret" †	Alyssa Milano	Joey Carbone; Jeff Carruthers; Mike Watson	Locked Inside a Dream	1991	
"One Last Dance"	Alyssa Milano	Jamey Jez; Ren Toppano; Viqui Denman	Do You See Me?	1992	
"Puppet on a String"	Alyssa Milano	Jamey Jez; Ren Toppano	Do You See Me?	1992	
"Rap"	Alyssa Milano	Jason Hervey; Ryan Lambert	Alyssa Milano's Teen Steam	1988	
"Say a Prayer Tonight"	Alyssa Milano	Tom Milano; Charles M. Inouye	Locked Inside a Dream	1991	
"Somewhere in Jamaica"	Alyssa Milano	Jamey Jez; Ren Toppano	Do You See Me?	1992	
"Step by Step"	Alyssa Milano	Joey Carbone; Dennis Belfield	Alyssa	1989	
"Straight to the Top" †	Alyssa Milano	Joey Carbone; Dennis Belfield	Look in My Heart	1989	
"Talk to Me"	Alyssa Milano	Jamey Jez; Ren Toppano	Do You See Me?	1992	
"Teen Steam Theme"	Alyssa Milano	Tom Milano; Sonny Gordon	Alyssa Milano's Teen Steam	1988	
"Through It All"	Alyssa Milano	Jamey Jaz; Ren Toppano; Bobby Huff	Locked Inside a Dream	1991	
"Voices That Care" †	Voices That Care	David Foster; Linda Thompson; Peter Cetera	Voices That Care	1991	
"Waiting for My Star"	Alyssa Milano	Joey Carbone; Tom Milano; Mark Davis	Look in My Heart	1989	
"Waiting for Your Love"	Alyssa Milano	Tom Milano; Charles M. Inouye	Do You See Me?	1992	
"We Are The World" †	Children Of The World Project	Michael Jackson; Lionel Richie	We Are The World, We Are The Children	1985	
"We Need the Children"	Alyssa Milano	Alyssa Milano; Joey Carbone; Tom Milano	Alyssa	1989	
"What a Feeling" †	Alyssa Milano	Joey Carbone; Dennis Belfield	Look in My Heart	1989	
"You Lied"	Alyssa Milano	Joey Carbone; Tom Milano	Look in My Heart	1989	
"Your Lips Don't Lie"	Alyssa Milano	Jamey Jaz; Ren Toppano; Ron Freeland	Locked Inside a Dream	1991	
