= Alyssa Milano discography =

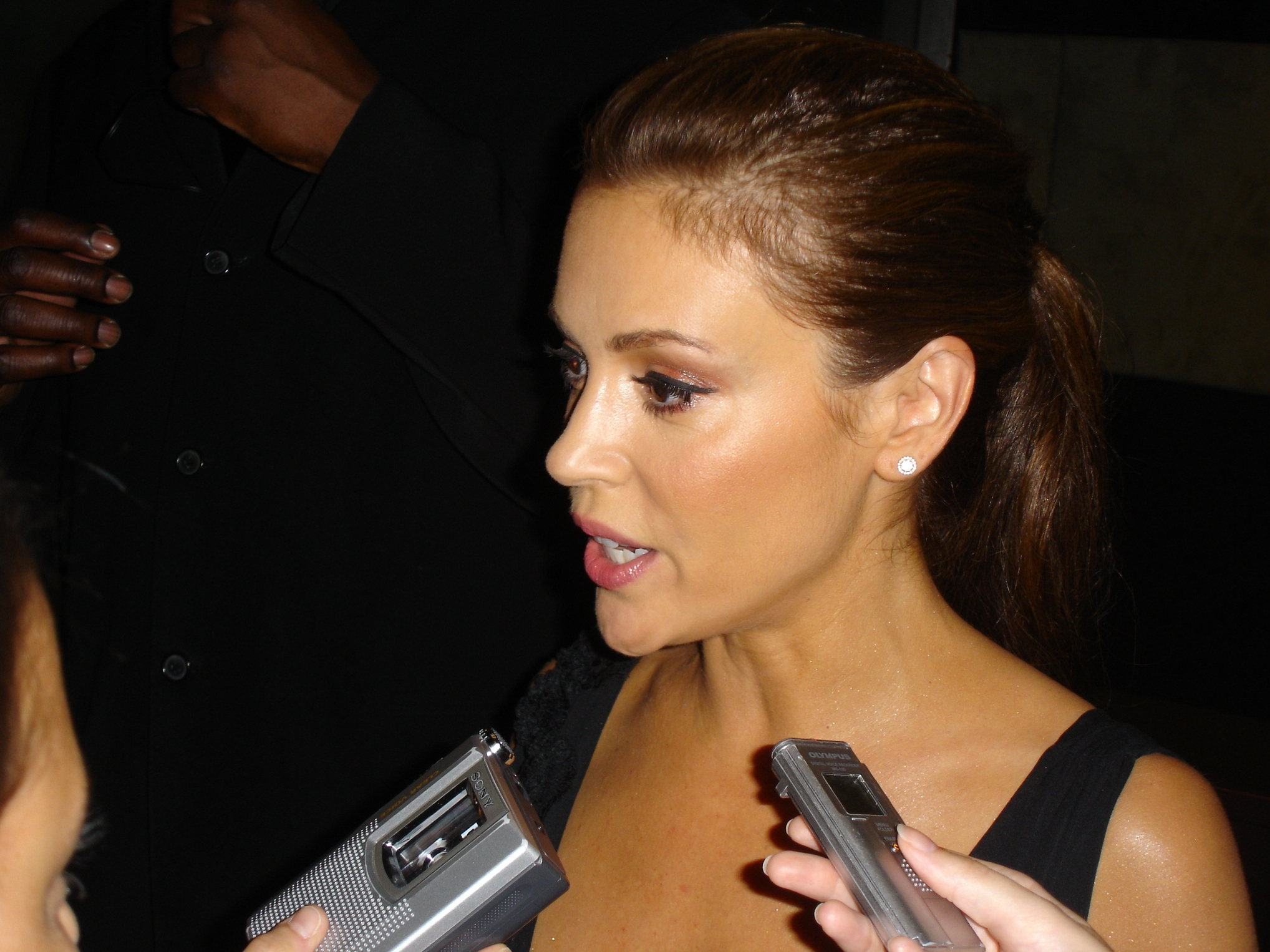
- Milano at the Major League All-Star Party Roseland Ballroom in 2008
- Studio albums: 4
- Compilation albums: 2
- Singles: 13
- Video albums: 2
- Music videos: 5
- Reissues: 1

American actress and singer Alyssa Milano has released: four studio albums, one reissue, two compilation albums, two video albums, five music videos and thirteen singles (including three charity singles). Milano debuted as an actress in the television sitcom Who's the Boss?, which premiered in September 1984. While acting, she signed a five-album deal with Japanese record label Pony Canyon, Inc. Prior to her record contract, Milano had contributed to the charity single "We Are The World" as part of a group of child stars. She also released an exercise video, entitled Alyssa Milano's Teen Steam, and recorded its theme song along with a rap.

Milano's debut studio album Look in My Heart was released in March 1989, peaking at number 68 on the Japanese Oricon Albums Chart. It produced the singles "Look in My Heart", "What a Feeling", and "Straight to the Top", as well as a video album of the same name. Milano's second and eponymous studio album was released later that year, and peaked at number 15 on the Oricon Albums Chart and was certified platinum by the Recording Industry Association of Japan (RIAJ). To promote the album, "I Had a Dream" and "Happiness" were made available for purchase as its singles. In 1990, the singer released her first compilation album, The Best in the World: Non-Stop Special Remix/Alyssa's Singles, which spent a total of eight weeks on the Oricon Albums Chart where it reached its highest position at number nine. The single "The Best in the World" peaked at number 85 on the Oricon Singles Chart, marking her only appearance on that chart.

In May 1990, Milano released the non-album single "I Love When We're Together", which was followed by the singer's third studio album Locked Inside a Dream in May 1991. It peaked at number 19 on the Oricon Albums Chart, remaining on it for a total of five weeks. It spawned the single "New Sensation". In that same year, Milano also contributed to the charity single "Voices That Care" as one of the choir members. The song peaked at number eleven on the Billboard Hot 100, and at number six on the Billboard Adult Contemporary chart. In addition it was certified platinum by the Recording Industry Association of America (RIAA). Her fourth studio album Do You See Me? was released in September 1992, and charted at number 47 on the Oricon Albums Chart. In 1993, Locked Inside a Dream was reissued exclusively in France with the title Alyssa Milano and was promoted there through the release of the single "No Secret". Milano's final record was her second compilation album, The Very Best of Alyssa Milano, released in January 1995.

== Albums ==
=== Studio albums ===
List of albums, with selected chart positions
Title	Album details	Peak chart positions	Certifications
Title	Album details	JPN	Certifications
Look in My Heart	Released: March 21, 1989; Pony Canyon, Inc. (D25Y0273); Cassette, CD	68	
Alyssa	Released: October 25, 1989; Pony Canyon, Inc. (PCCY-00026); Cassette, CD	15	RIAJ: Platinum
Locked Inside a Dream	Released: May 21, 1991; Pony Canyon, Inc. (PCCY-00204); Cassette, CD	19	
Do You See Me?	Released: September 18, 1992; Pony Canyon, Inc. (PCCY-00368); Cassette, CD	47	

=== Reissues ===
Title	Album details
Alyssa Milano	Released: 1993; Remark Records (517 837-4); Cassette, CD; Reissue of Locked Inside a Dream in France

=== Compilation albums ===
List of albums, with selected chart positions
Title	Album details	Peak chart positions
Title	Album details	JPN
The Best in the World: Non-Stop Special Remix/Alyssa's Singles	Released: February 21, 1990; Pony Canyon, Inc. (PCCY-00059); Cassette, CD	9
The Very Best of Alyssa Milano	Released: January 1995; Pony Canyon, Inc. (DSP-182); Promotional CD	—
"—" denotes items which failed to chart or were not released in that country.

== Singles ==
=== As lead artist ===
List of singles as lead artist, with selected chart positions, showing year released and album name
Title	Year	Peak chart positions	Album
Title	Year	JPN	Album
"Look in My Heart"	1989	—	Look in My Heart
"What a Feeling"	1989	—	Look in My Heart
"Straight to the Top"	1989	—	Look in My Heart
"I Had a Dream"	1989	—	Alyssa
"Happiness"	1989	—	Alyssa
"The Best in the World"	1990	85	The Best in the World: Non-Stop Special Remix/Alyssa's Singles
"I Love When We're Together"	1990	—	Non-album single
"New Sensation"	1991	—	Locked Inside a Dream
"Do You See Me?"	1992	—	Do You See Me?
"No Secret"^{1}	1993	—	Alyssa Milano
"—" denotes items which failed to chart or were not released in that country.

Footnotes:

- ^{1} Only released as a single in France

=== Charity singles ===
List of charity singles, with selected chart positions, showing year released
Title	Year	Peak chart positions		Certifications	Album
Title	Year	US	US AC	Certifications	Album
"Care for Kids"	1989	—	—		"We Are The World"
"We Are The World"	1989	—	—		"We Are The World"
"Voices That Care"	1991	11	6	RIAA: Platinum	Non-album single
"—" denotes items which failed to chart or were not released in that country.

== Videography ==
=== Video albums ===
Title	Album details	Notes
Alyssa Milano's Teen Steam	Released: September 8, 1988; Label: Canadian Video Factory; Format: VHS	An exercise video featuring Milano and two female co-stars working out while listening to 1980s pop music.; Milano performs the video's theme song "Teen Steam" and a rap. The title track and its instrumental version were also made available on a 7-inch vinyl record.; The VHS release included an offer for the "Teen Steam" record, an autographed photo, and other related products.
Look in My Heart	Released: March 21, 1989; Label: Pony Canyon; Format: VHS	Includes a feature on "Alyssa's Backstage Memories" and music videos for "What A Feeling", "Straight to The Top", and "You Lied to Me".; Also features one of Milano's Japanese commercials for pasta. The song "Look in My Heart" plays during the advertisement, which appears following the video's credits.

=== Music videos ===
Title	Year	Director(s)
"What a Feeling"	1989	Unknown
"Look In My Heart"	1989	Unknown
"Straight to the Top"	1989	Unknown
"You Lied to Me"	1989	Unknown
"I Had a Dream"	1989	Unknown
