= Surviving Sex Trafficking =

Documentary film

- Directed by: Sadhvi Siddhali Shree
- Produced by: Sadhvi Siddhali Shree Sadhvi Anubhuti
- Edited by: Zack Tzourtzouklis
- Music by: Andor Sperling
- Production company: Siddhayatan Tirth
- Distributed by: Stopping Traffic Productions Siddhayatan Tirth Productions
- Release date: March 25, 2022
- Running time: 70 minutes
- Country: United States
- Language: English

Surviving Sex Trafficking is a 2022 American documentary film directed by Sadhvi Siddhali Shree and produced by the team of monks at Siddhayatan Tirth.

The film focuses on the ongoing sex trafficking and sexual abuse in the United States and worldwide based upon stories of the survivors who were sex trafficked by their abusers.

== Synopsis ==
Surviving Sex Trafficking is a follow up of 2017 documentary Stopping Traffic by Sadhvi Siddhali Shree. It addresses the global problem of sex trafficking and features interviews with the survivors named Angela Williams, Rachel D. Fischer and Kendra Geronimo. The story rotates around the lives of those victims, their struggle for freedom, including the incidents after setting themselves free, and the mental trauma they had to deal with.

Sadhvi Siddhali Shree herself is also featured in the documentary and shares her own story of child abuse and PTSD. The production team travelled various parts of United States including Houston, Miami, Las Vegas and New Jersey and other countries like Hungary, India, Philippines, and Ethiopia gathering stories of the women who have been the victims of sex trafficking and somehow managed to escape. The film also highlights the fact that only 1% of the 45 million victims manage to escape and survive once trafficked.

== Production ==
Surviving Sex Trafficking is the second documentary which has been directed and produced by Sadhvi Siddhali Shree after her first documentary, Stopping Traffic which was released in 2017. She is a US based Jain monk, film director, author, TEDx speaker, Iraq War veteran and victim of child abuse.

Alyssa Milano, Jeannie Mai and Jeezy are the executive producers of the documentary and the production house is Siddhayatan Tirth. The film has been inspired by the teachings of non-violence by Acharya Shree Yogeesh, who is also the executive producer of the film. Sadhvi Anubhuti is the co-producer.

== Release ==
Surviving Sex Trafficking had its official worldwide premiere at the Vail Film Festival in 2021. The film was released in theaters on March 25, 2022, and was made available on streaming platforms on April 15, 2022. On January 25, 2023, in recognition of Human Trafficking Awareness Month, the documentary was screened by the students for violence prevention at Pittsburg State University.
