= Sadhvi Anubhuti =

Film producer and Jain monk

- Born: Tania Máynez
- Citizenship: American
- Education: Bauer College of Business (B.B.A.)
- Occupations: Jain monk, film maker
- Notable work: Stopping Traffic; Surviving Sex Trafficking
- Website: sadhvianubhuti.com

Sadhvi Anubhuti (born Tania Máynez) is a Jain monk, film producer, director and activist.

== Early life and education ==
Sadhvi Anubhuti was born in Toluca, Mexico and grew up in Houston, Texas until the age of 12. She graduated from the C.T. Bauer College of Business at the University of Houston with a BBA in Marketing, a Minor in French.

== Career ==
She left her marketing career at the age of 29 before being associated with a Jain-Hindu Tirth, Siddhayatan Tirth to become the first Mexican and Hispanic Jain monk. Sadhvi also serves as the operations director of Siddhayatan Tirth.

She has been inspired by her mentors Acharya Shree Yogeesh and Sadhvi Siddhali Shree regarding their teachings of non-violence, compassion and respect for all living beings.

Sadhvi Anubhuti has served as the assistant director of a 2017 documentary, Stopping Traffic. She has also served as the director of photography and co-producer, alongside Sadhvi Siddhali Shree in a 2022 documentary, Surviving Sex Trafficking.

Anubhuti, along with Sadhvi Siddhali Shree, is the co-director and co-producer of a 2023 documentary, "For The Animals". "For The Animals" is a documentary about a small group of animal rights activists in Houston, Texas, dedicated to saving the lives of stray cats and dogs which have been living on the streets. The film is set to be distributed by Filmhub, by the end of 2023.

== Filmography ==
Year	Title	Role
2017	Stopping Traffic	Assistant Director
2022	Surviving Sex Trafficking	Cinematographer
2023	For the Animals	Director, producer
2026	Balance: A Perimenopause Journey	Director, producer

== Activism ==
Sadhvi Anubhuti is a human and animal rights activist. The documentary Stopping Traffic, exposed the sex trade and human trafficking across the nations including Europe, Latin American and Asian countries and the United States etc.

In January 2018, NowThis News selected the film during the National Human Trafficking Awareness Month, featuring the video of the two Jain nuns, Sadhvi Siddhali Shree and Sadhvi Anubhuti, and excerpts from the documentary.
