= Mary Claire Haver =

American author and menopause advocate

- Born: Lafayette, Louisiana, United States
- Education: Louisiana State University Medical Center; University of Texas Medical Branch
- Occupations: Obstetrician-gynecologist, author, menopause advocate
- Children: 2

Mary Claire Haver is an American obstetrician-gynecologist, author, and menopause advocate known for her work calling for better clinical and cultural understanding of menopause. Her book The New Menopause appeared on The New York Times Best Sellers list, and she hosts the podcast UnPAUSED, focused on women's health and midlife wellbeing.

== Early life and education ==
Haver grew up in Lafayette, Louisiana, the fifth of eight children in a family that owned a local restaurant. She earned her medical degree from Louisiana State University Medical Center and completed her residency in obstetrics and gynecology at the University of Texas Medical Branch (UTMB) in Galveston. She is board-certified in obstetrics and gynecology and holds certifications as a Menopause Practitioner and Culinary Medicine Specialist.

== Career ==
Haver graduated from her OB-GYN residency in 2002, and went on to work in both private practice and academic hospital settings, including roles at University of Texas Health Science Center at Houston (UT Health).and UTMB, according to her website.

In response to growing demand among her aging patients, along with the process of treating her own menopause symptoms, she shifted her focus to menopause care in 2021. She opened Mary Claire Wellness, a clinic in Galveston, Texas dedicated to women's mid-life health. Haver went on to found the platform The ‘Pause Life, a website and community for menopause education, and The ‘Pause Nutrition, a range of supplements for women in perimenopause and menopause.

Haver has been featured as a menopause expert in outlets including The New York Times, Forbes, The Today Show, and CNN. In 2025, Time magazine named her among its “100 Most Influential Creators.” She has millions of followers across social media platforms, where she shares information on hormone therapy, nutrition, exercise, and preventive health.

== Advocacy ==
Haver is an advocate for expanding medical education, research, and clinical attention to menopause and midlife women's health. She has spoken widely about the historical lack of menopause training in medical curricula and the need for evidence-based, individualized care. She emphasizes that menopause should be recognized as a major phase of women's health with implications for cardiovascular, musculoskeletal, genitourinary, and cognitive well-being.

In 2023, Haver joined more than 200 clinicians, researchers, and professors in signing an open letter to The Lancet, criticizing what they described as outdated representations of menopause and calling for increased funding and physician education on the topic. The group, informally referred to as the “Menoposse,” sought to modernize the medical and cultural understanding of menopause through coordinated public and professional outreach.

In 2025, Haver partnered with menopause policy advocate Jennifer Weiss-Wolf to publish A Citizen’s Guide to Menopause Advocacy, a free resource designed to help individuals and community groups advance legislative change in menopause care. Their collaboration coincided with legislative activity in more than a dozen U.S. states considering bills related to menopause education, workplace accommodations, and clinician training.

Later that year, Haver publicly praised the U.S. Food and Drug Administration's decision to remove the long-standing “black box” warning on many estrogen-containing hormone therapy products, describing the change as “a win for women and for women’s health.”

== Books ==
- The New Perimenopause: An Evidence-Based Guide to Surviving the Zone of Chaos and Feeling Like Yourself Again. New York, NY: Rodale Books. 2026. ISBN 978-0-593-73661-6. OCLC 1577289365. (forthcoming April 2026) — Announced as a resource on perimenopausal health, hormonal variability, and strategies to support physical and emotional well-being during the transition to menopause.
- The New Menopause: Navigating Your Path through Hormonal Change with Purpose, Power, and Facts. New York: Rodale Books. 2024. ISBN 978-0-593-79625-2. OCLC 1429737200. — A guide addressing the physical, neurological, psychological, and sexual changes associated with menopause. The book appeared on The New York Times Best Seller list and was named a New York Post “Best Book of the Year.”
- The Galveston Diet: The Doctor-Developed, Patient-Proven Plan to Burn Fat and Tame Your Hormonal Symptoms. New York: Rodale Books. 2023. ISBN 978-0-593-57889-6. OCLC 1356007630. — Introduces a nutrition and lifestyle plan designed to reduce inflammation and midlife weight gain during the menopausal transition.

== Podcasts ==
Haver launched the podcast UnPAUSED in October 2025, focusing on menopause, brain health, metabolism, relationships, and identity in mid-life. She has also appeared as a guest on many health, news, entrepreneurship and lifestyle podcasts, including: Huberman Lab, Unlocking Us with Brené Brown, Diary of a CEO, Mel Robbins, and Armchair Expert with Dax Shepard.

== Television and documentaries ==
Haver has been featured in several television specials and documentary films focused on menopause and women's health. In 2024, she appeared in M Factor: Shredding the Silence on Menopause, a PBS documentary examining the medical and cultural treatment of menopausal women. In 2025, she was interviewed for An Oprah Winfrey Special: The Menopause Revolution, broadcast on ABC, which highlighted hormone therapy and midlife well-being and included discussions with actress Halle Berry and advocate Maria Shriver. She is a medical contributor featured in Balance: A Perimenopause Journey, a four-part documentary series directed by monk-filmmakers Sadhvi Siddhali Shree and Sadhvi Anubhuti.

== Personal life ==
Haver resides in Galveston, Texas, with her husband and two daughters.
