= Sadhvi (name) =

Sadhvi is the feminine form of the title sadhu: a religious ascetic, mendicant or holy person in Hinduism, Buddhism, and Jainism. People with this title in their name include:

- Sadhvi Kanakprabha, eighth head nun of Jain Shwetamber Terapanth religious order
- Niranjan Jyoti, also called Sadhvi Niranjan Jyoti, Indian Minister of State for Rural Development
- Pragya Singh Thakur, also called Sadhvi Pragya, member of the Lok Sabha
- Sadhvi Siddhali Shree, Jain monk, TEDx speaker, and activist
- Sadhvi Rithambara, founder-chairperson of Durga Vahini
