= Tamsen Fadal =

American television personality (born 1970)

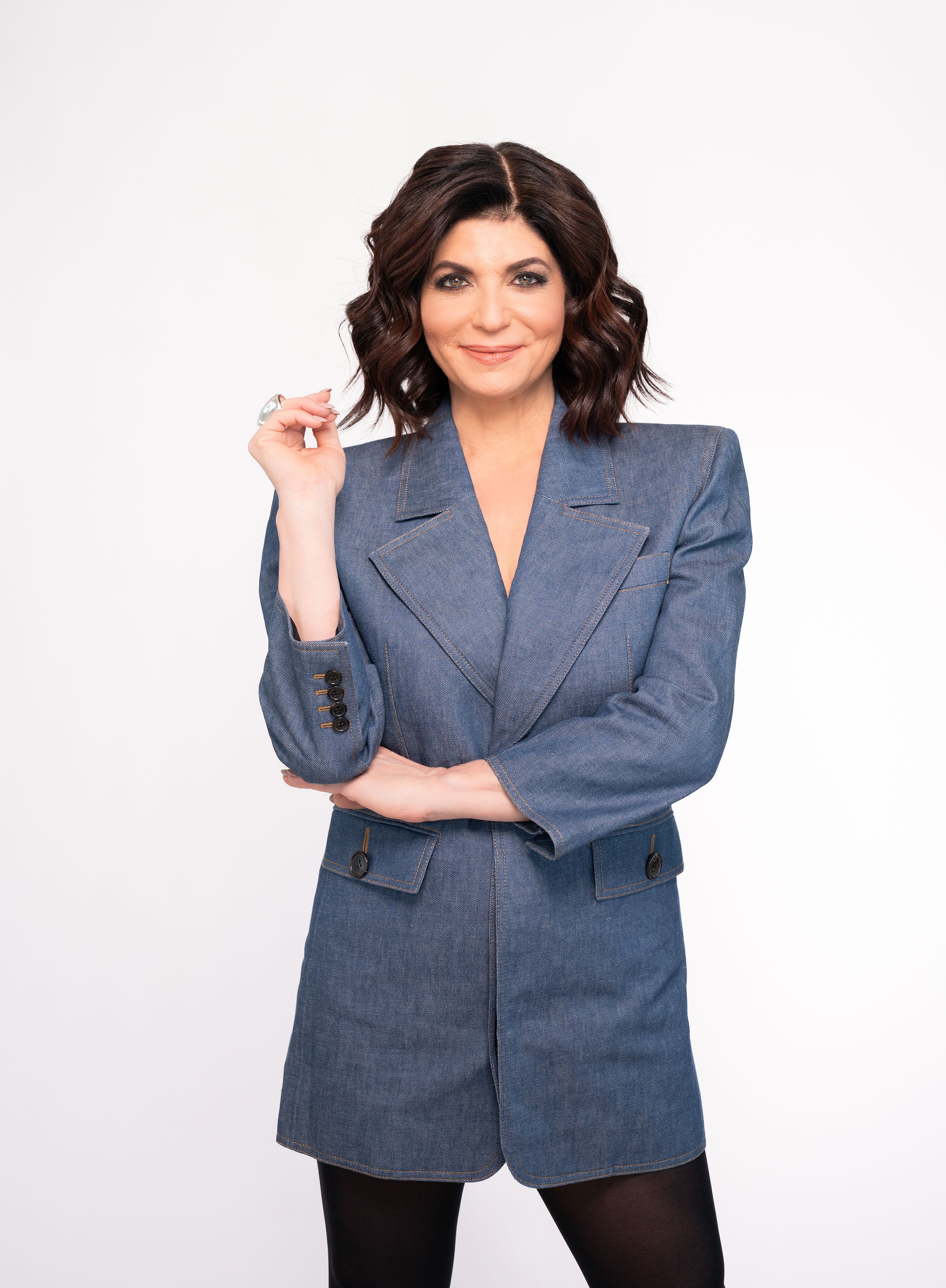
- Born: Tamsen Fadal; December 4, 1970 (age 55); Concord, Massachusetts, U.S.
- Education: University of South Florida
- Occupations: Journalist, author
- Years active: 1989–present
- Known for: Menopause advocacy
- Spouses: Matt Titus (m. 2007; div. 2012) Ira Bernstein (m. 2021)
- Relatives: Shannon Elizabeth (cousin)
- Website: https://www.tamsenfadal.com

Tamsen Fadal (born December 4, 1970) is an American journalist, writer, and menopause advocate. She is the author of the New York Times bestseller How To Menopause, Reclaim Your Health, Take Charge of Your Life and Feel Even Better Than Before. She is co-producer and executive producer of two documentary films The M Factor: Shredding the Silence on Menopause. and The M Factor 2: Before the Pause, focused on Perimenopause. https://themfactorfilm.com/ She is also the founder of the social media #PostYourPatch movement to normalize conversations around hormone therapy.

== Early life and education ==
Fadal was born in Concord, Massachusetts. She has a younger brother. In 1990, she lost her mother to breast cancer. She graduated from the University of South Florida in 1992 with a Bachelor of Arts degree in journalism. Fadal is of Lebanese descent. Her cousin is actress Shannon Elizabeth.

== Career ==
Fadal began her broadcasting career as a morning anchor for WHNZ Radio in Tampa, Florida. In 2002, she traveled to Afghanistan with the American troops reporting on the war. Fadal reported for WPGH-TV in Pittsburgh, Pennsylvania, WFTV in Orlando, Florida and WOWK-TV in Charleston, West Virginia and KYW-TV in Philadelphia. In 2004, she joined WCBS in New York City, and she joined WPIX on March 24, 2008, reporting and anchoring for the Morning News five days a week, covering breaking news as well as feature stories.

Fadal co-starred in the 2009 docu-series, "Matched In Manhattan" on Lifetime (TV Network) as a dating coach to clients.

In 2019, Fadal became the host and executive producer of Broadway Profiles for The Broadway Channel, a monthly series featuring in-depth interviews with celebrities as well as an inside look at the Broadway industry The show began airing weekly in fall 2020, when it became the first program about Broadway to be nationally syndicated. In September 2021, the show's name changed to The Broadway Show with Tamsen Fadal. She is the host and executive producer of The Broadway Show.

Fadal received a Broadcast Journalism award by the National Air Disaster Foundation in 2004 [NADF] post-9/11, for contributions leading to improved aviation safety. Fadal was named the University of South Florida Outstanding Young Alumnus of 2004, University of South Florida AlumNews, October 2004.

She has won 13 local Emmy awards. In 2016, Fadal received the Ellis Island Medal of Honor, an American award founded by the Ellis Island Honors Society (EIHS) (formerly known as National Ethnic Coalition of Organizations (NECO)). In 2015, Fadal was named a "Power Woman". In 2014 she was selected to receive the Soldiers', Sailors', Marines', Coast Guard and Airmen's Club Media Award for her coverage of the war in Afghanistan.

Fadal covered the history-making appearance of Hamilton in Puerto Rico in 2019 after Hurricane Maria devastated the island nation.

In 2020, Fadal began to share her experiences as a woman in midlife on social media. In 2023, Fadal transitioned away from her full-time anchor role to focus on midlife health advocacy, specifically menopause education.

In October 2024, she executive produced and co-produced The M Factor, a documentary addressing the stigma and silence surrounding menopause. The film aired nationally on PBS and was screened in over 700 cities across 44 countries. The documentary was featured in Forbes, Oprah Daily, and Vogue for its impact on shifting cultural attitudes around menopause care and midlife women's health.

In March 2025, Fadal released How to Menopause: Reclaim Your Health, Take Charge of Your Life and Feel Even Better Than Before, a comprehensive book designed to help women navigate perimenopause and menopause with clarity and confidence. The book combines personal storytelling with science-backed information and includes interviews with over 42 of the leading experts in the menopause space. Described as a "girlfriend's guide grounded in real science", the book covers topics ranging from hormone therapy and brain fog to body image, sleep, and sex. How to Menopause became a New York Times, USA Today, and Publishers Weekly bestseller. The book was publicly endorsed by Halle Berry, who called it "the menopause bible". Later that year, Fadal hosted the World's Hottest Menopause Party, a virtual event that drew over 100,000 global attendees, making it the largest menopause-focused digital gathering to date.

That same year, she launched The Tamsen Show, a podcast focused on midlife, reinvention, and women's health. She interviews top doctors and thought leaders in menopause, aging, and relationships. The debut episode featured Halle Berry and helped the show reach Apple's Top 40 within the first two months.

== Advocacy ==
Fadal is an advocate for menopause awareness and in the fight against breast cancer. After losing her mother to the disease in 1990, she continues to be involved with the Avon 39 Walk To End Breast Cancer. She also lends her support to SHARE Cancer Support. She serves on the advisory board for Let's Talk Menopause helping advocate for menopause awareness through social media. Fadal is honorary vice chair of Adapt Community Network, formerly United Cerebral Palsy of New York City. Fadal is a celebrity ambassador for Northshore Animal League Fadal is on the board of directors for Best Buddies International, a nonprofit organization dedicated to establishing a global volunteer movement that creates opportunities for one-to-one friendships, integrated employment and leadership development for people with intellectual and developmental disabilities (IDD).

In 2024, Fadal co-produced and executive produced The M Factor, a documentary that explores the medical, social, and emotional impact of menopause. The film aired nationally on PBS and was covered by major outlets including The Today Show, Vogue, Forbes, Oprah Daily, and The New York Times. In Vogue, the project was described as part of "a long-overdue wave of content focused on menopausal women", and Oprah Daily praised it for "shredding the silence around menopause and demanding better answers for women everywhere". The film was screened in over 700 cities across 44 countries, often as part of local community events and women-led discussion groups, helping spark a global movement around midlife health awareness.

In April 2025, Fadal hosted the World's Hottest Menopause Party, a landmark global livestream broadcast from a studio in Las Vegas. The event was free for attendees and featured public figures like Halle Berry, Naomi Watts, Jennie Garth, and Carla Hall, as well as leading menopause doctors and specialists. The event reached over 100,000 viewers worldwide and was described by Forbes as a "breakthrough in how we talk about women's health in public culture".

== Book ==
In March 2025, Tamsen Fadal published How to Menopause: Take Charge of Your Health, Reclaim Your Life, and Feel Even Better Than Before, a bestselling book that quickly became a defining resource for midlife women. Halle Berry called it "the menopause bible", and Naomi Watts praised it as "the perfect manual on how we can take midlife into our own hands". Blending personal storytelling with deeply researched guidance, the book features insights from over 42 of the world's top experts in menopause, hormones, mental health, and aging. OBGYN Dr. Mary Claire Haver described it as "a blueprint to not only survive the menopause transition but thrive". How to Menopause became a New York Times, USA Today, and Publishers Weekly bestseller, and was featured in Forbes, Oprah Daily, Page Six, and US Weekly for helping push menopause into the mainstream cultural conversation.

The book was also selected as a "Must Read" by the Next Big Idea Club—a book club curated by thought leaders like Adam Grant, Susan Cain, Malcolm Gladwell, and Daniel Pink—highlighting its impact in reshaping how women approach midlife and health.

== Personal life ==
On October 4, 2007, Fadal married Matthew "Matt" Titus after three years of dating. The duo ran their own dating business and published books together. In 2012, the couple divorced.

In 2017, Fadal began dating Ira Bernstein. The couple married on October 2, 2021.

== Publications ==
- Titus, Matt & Fadal, Tamsen (2007). Why Hasn't He Called? How Guys Really Think & How to Get the Right One Interested in You. New York City: McGraw Hill. ISBN 007154609X
- Titus, Matt & Fadal, Tamsen (2008). Why Hasn't He Proposed? Go from the First Date to Setting the Date. New York City: McGraw Hill. ISBN 0071614966
- Titus, Matt & Fadal, Tamsen (2010). Don't Date Dumb: 10 Rules All Singles Should Swear By. ISBN 9780557928477
- Fadal, Tamsen (2015). The New Single: Finding, Fixing, and Falling Back in Love with Yourself After a Breakup or Divorce. New York City: St. Martin's Griffin. ISBN 1250064007
- Fadal, Tamsen (2025). How to Menopause: Take Charge Of Your Habits, Reclaim Your Life, and Feel Even Better Than Before. Hachette Go. ISBN 0306833549

== Awards ==
- 2013 Regional Emmy award On-Camera Talent: Anchor- News Tamsen Fadal. July 17, 2013. (WPIX-TV). "Composite".
- 2013 Regional Emmy award Remembering Mayor Ed Koch. February 1, 2013. (WPIX-TV). Tamsen Fadal, Anchor; Marvin Scott, Mary Murphy, Reporters; Jay Dow, Correspondent.
- 2015 nominated for the Regional Emmy award Outstanding Regional News Story – Spot News - Metro-North Train Derailment - (WPIX-TV) Anchors - Tamsen Fadal, Scott Stanford
- 2016 Fadal received the Ellis Island Medal of Honor, an American award founded by the Ellis Island Honors Society (EIHS)
- 2018 Regional Emmy award for Talent: Anchor - News" (WPIX-TV)
- 2018 Regional Emmy award for Reporter: News Special - Unrest in America, January 29, 2017. (WPIX-TV)
- 2018 Regional Emmy award for Talent: Commentator/Editorialist/Program Host/Moderator
- 2019 Fadal honored with the Ackerman Family Advocate Award

== See also ==
- New Yorkers in journalism
