= Born to Love =

Born to Love may refer to:

- Born to Love (film), a 1931 film with Constance Bennett
- Born to Love (Mayday album), 2007
- Born to Love (Peabo Bryson and Roberta Flack album), 1983
- "Born to Love" (Meduza song), 2020
- "Born to Love", a 1985 song by Claudja Barry
- "Born to Love", a 1988 song by Den Harrow
- "Born to Love", a 1971 song by SRC
- "Born to Love", a 1937 song by Billie Holiday
- "Born to Love", a song by Nazareth on the 1977 album Play 'n' the Game
- "Born to Love", a song by Alyssa Milano on the 1989 album Look in My Heart
- "Born to Love", a song by Randy Stonehill on the 1990 album Until We Have Wings
