= Do You See Me? =

Do You See Me? may refer to:

- Do You See Me? (album), 1992 album by Alyssa Milano
- Do You See Me? (film), 2014 Italian film
- "Do You See Me?", a 2025 song by the Happy Fits
