= Balance: A Perimenopause Journey =

American documentary series

- Genre: Documentary
- Directed by: Sadhvi Siddhali Shree; Sadhvi Anubhuti
- Music by: Andor Sperling
- Country of origin: United States
- Original language: English
- No. of episodes: 4

Production
- Executive producers: Alyssa Milano; Jeannie Mai; Acharya Shree Yogeesh
- Producers: Sadhvi Siddhali Shree; Sadhvi Anubhuti
- Cinematography: Cesar Ramos-Ortiz
- Editor: Zack Tzourtzouklis
- Production company: Siddhayatan Tirth Productions

Original release
- Network: Amazon Prime Video, Apple TV (TVOD), Plex
- Release: January 30, 2026

Balance: A Perimenopause Journey is an American four-part documentary series directed by monk-filmmakers Sadhvi Siddhali Shree and Sadhvi Anubhuti.

The series was released on January 30, 2026, as a transactional video-on-demand (TVOD) title on platforms including Amazon Prime Video, Plex and Apple TV.

== Synopsis ==
The documentary follows directors Sadhvi Siddhali Shree and Sadhvi Anubhuti as they explore perimenopause while documenting their own experiences with symptoms such as sleep disturbance, anxiety, fatigue, and mood changes. Their personal accounts are combined with interviews with medical professionals and patients discussing diagnosis, treatment, and access to care.

The series also addresses broader topics related to women’s health, including gaps in medical education, disparities in healthcare access, and the long-term impact of the 2002 Women’s Health Initiative study on clinical attitudes toward hormone replacement therapy.

Medical contributors featured in the series include Dr. Mary Claire Haver, Dr. Louise Newson, Dr. Vonda Wright, Dr. Heather Hirsch, and Dr. Sharon Malone.

== Production ==
The series is produced by Sadhvi Siddhali Shree, Sadhvi Anubhuti, Zack Tzourtzouklis, and Cesar Ramos-Ortiz. Executive producers include Alyssa Milano, Jeannie Mai, Acharya Shree Yogeesh, the EMA Foundation, Linda and Jon Halbert, Heather Badal, Michael Cain, Stephanie Collins, Jeff Barstad, Tama Lundquist, Tena Lundquist Faust, Marian McClendon, and Rosie Acosta.

== Release and distribution ==
Filmhub handles distribution internationally. Ahead of its release, the filmmakers held several preview screenings in the United States. In March 2025, a related women’s health event took place at The Tower Club in Dallas, which included a keynote address by menopause specialist Dr. Louise Newson.

== Coverage ==
In December 2025, People magazine published coverage of the series’ trailer, referencing its discussion of perimenopause beyond symptoms such as hot flashes and night sweats. NBC News also covered the filmmakers prior to the series release.

In 2026, Balance: A Perimenopause Journey was among the television programs campaigning for consideration at the 78th Primetime Emmy Awards.
