= The Very Best of Alyssa Milano =

Album by Alyssa Milano

Greatest hits album by Alyssa Milano
- Released: January 1995
- Recorded: 1988–1992
- Genre: Pop, dance-pop, R&B
- Length: 37:48
- Label: Pony Canyon Inc./Canyon International/TriStar
- Producer: Joey Carbone, Katz Nagasawa, Tom Milano

Alyssa Milano chronology
Do You See Me? (1992)	The Very Best of Alyssa Milano (1995)

The Very Best Of Alyssa Milano is a compilation album recorded by Alyssa Milano during her pursuit, mainly in Japan, of a singing career. A more complete collection of Milano's greatest hits and other singles than the previously released The Best In The World remix collection. The album was only released as a promotional CD.

== Track listing ==
#	Title	Time
1.	"Do You See Me?" (Tom Milano, Charles M. Inouye)	4:43
2.	"Look in My Heart" (Joey Carbone, Dennis Belfield)	3:30
3.	"Straight to the Top" (Joey Carbone, Dennis Belfield)	3:21
4.	"What a Feeling" (Joey Carbone, Dennis Belfield)	3:47
5.	"I Had a Dream" (Joey Carbone, Dennis Belfield)	3:45
6.	"Happiness" (Joey Carbone, Tom Milano, Mark Davis)	3:41
7.	"The Best in the World" (Joey Carbone, Dennis Belfield)	4:07
8.	"I Love When We're Together" (Joey Carbone, Dennis Belfield)	3:56
9.	"New Sensation" (Joey Carbone, Jeff Carruthers)	4:15
10.	"Do You See Me?" (Tom Milano, Charles M. Inouye)	4:43

== Singles ==
No singles were issued from this album, which was never released in the United States. It was only made in Japan, and solely as a promotional album.
