= Tempting Fate (2019 film) =

- Poster
- Genre: Drama
- Based on: Tempting Fate by Jane Green
- Written by: Jennifer Maisel
- Directed by: Kim Raver; Manu Boyer
- Starring: Alyssa Milano
- Music by: Shawn Pierce
- Country of origin: United States
- Original language: English language

Production
- Executive producer: Jocelyn Freid
- Producers: Shawn Williamson; Jamie Goehring; Kevin Leeson
- Cinematography: Tom Harting
- Editor: Rob Grant
- Running time: 87 minutes

Original release
- Network: Lifetime
- Release: June 15, 2019

Tempting Fate is a 2019 American made-for-television drama film directed by Kim Raver in her directorial debut and Manu Boyer, starring Alyssa Milano as a married housewife who becomes pregnant with another man's baby. The movie is based on author Jane Green's 2014 New York Times best-selling novel of the same name.

Tempting Fate is the first of three Lifetime movies based on novels by Jane Green. The other movie adaptations aired shortly after are To Have and to Hold (2019) and Family Pictures (2019).

== Plot ==
42-year-old Gabby has a seemingly perfect life: married with two teenage daughters, she lives in a typical Connecticut neighborhood and leads a typical life. She restores furniture as a hobby, while her husband Elliott works as a doctor to provide for the family. Unbeknownst to many, her marriage is currently going through a rough patch; Gabby desperately wants to have a third kid, but Elliott is unwilling and underwent a vasectomy without consulting his wife. In order to reduce tensions inside the house, Elliott takes the girls on a weekend trip to Vermont while she stays at home. Her good friend Claire convinces Gabby to accompany her to a party, where Gabby soon meets 33-year-old Matt Shaw, a successful web developer. Even though Gabby tells him about her marriage, they hit it off, and Matt invites her to join a business meeting the next day.

Coming from a humble background, Matt has used his power for projects such as building non-profit schools. He is currently building a school in the neighborhood and hires Gabby as a designer. Initially wary of getting close to Matt, Gabby soon develops a crush on him, and their correspondence grows more and more flirtatious. Meanwhile, Gabby grows more estranged from her husband, especially when Elliott reveals that he is not willing to undergo a reverse vasectomy. As Elliot devotes more time to his work, Gabby spends more time with Matt. One night while having dinner together, Gabby asks him to respect her marriage and boundaries. Nevertheless, their relationship becomes physical before long.

Torn by guilt, Gabby immediately cuts off all contact with Matt, though soon she finds out she is pregnant. Claire recommends her to get an abortion, but she is unwilling to and instead tells Elliott the whole truth. Feeling betrayed by his wife's infidelity, he moves out of the house. Gabby tells her daughters the truth about her affair and pregnancy, which prompts the older one, Olivia, to move out too, though her younger daughter is more supportive and decides to help her mom out. Before long, Elliott announces to Gabby that he wants a divorce and will sell their house. Seeing her life fall apart, Gabby tries to make amends, and puts all of her energy into her furniture restoration to earn enough money to buy the house from Elliott. Despite her attempts to save their marriage, Elliott cannot forgive her and starts to date Trish, an acquaintance of Gabby.

Shortly after, Gabby gives birth to a son, Henry. Olivia reconciles with her mother and moves back in to help her out with Henry. Gabby reconnects with Matt to give him an opportunity to meet his son. He is now happily dating another woman, Monroe. Elliott, meanwhile, breaks off his relationship with Trish, and finally decides to give his marriage to Gabby another chance. In the end, all parties work out an agreement that Gabby and Elliott will raise Henry, while Matt meets with them once in a while.

== Cast ==
- Alyssa Milano as Gabby Cartwright
- Zane Holtz as Matt Shaw
- Steve Kazee as Elliott Cartwright
- Jessica Harmon as Claire
- Lucia Walters as Trish
- Magda Apanowicz as Josephine
- Emilija Baranac as Olivia Cartwright
- Beatrice Kitsos as Alana Cartwright
- Daniel Bacon as Tim
- Kelly Konno as Dr. Rodriguez
- Rebecca Olson as Monroe

== Production ==
In June 2018, it was announced that three Jane Green novels would be adapted for the small screen, with Kim Raver as the director for and Alyssa Milano as the leading actress in Tempting Fate.

Raver was drawn to the script because "the central figure doesn’t become a victim but instead finds her own voice". Milano signed on for similar reasons: "Having a movie that combines the sensationalized idea of infidelity but still giving it something that is rounded and has depth and nuance. It’s a testament to [executive producers and directors] Kim [Raver] and Manu Boyer. I think this would have been a very different movie in different directors’ hands."

Milano commented in an interview that she intentionally did not read the novel before production: "I get really nervous reading books that people love and then going in and playing those characters. I think I would've obsessed over making sure I was giving the fans of the book what they felt they needed rather than giving the character what it needed to be a successful character."

== Reception ==
Milano's role in the movie sparked some online backlash due to the actress' public stance in support for abortion rights, while in the movie her character will not consider abortion. In a June 2019 interview, Milano commented on these parallels: "I think anytime you’re able to convey social, political issues in art and storytelling, it’s an important thing to do, because it kind of depoliticizes [the issue]. It’s good for the social movement aspect because it humanizes it. You then understand the process of what goes into making a decision like that. I think that that’s really important. I don’t wish there was more [dialogue about abortion] in the film because I think it deals with it in a perfect way, especially because Gabby talked about wanting more kids. Also, it wasn’t like, the Republican party is going to pull back Roe v. Wade, let’s deal with that in our Lifetime movie. We never had that kind of conversation. But I'm glad it’s in there, for sure."
