= Matt Titus =

American relationship coach

Matthew Titus is a matchmaker, author, public speaker, dating and relationship coach based in New York City.

Titus is the co-author of two dating and relationship advice books: "Why Hasn't He Called?" and "Why Hasn't He Proposed?" Matt starred in the 2009 reality series, "Matched In Manhattan" on Lifetime, which chronicled Matt helping Manhattan singles find love and couples strengthen their relationships. Matt starred in NBC’s "The Match Off", a matchmaker competition show in which two matchmakers were challenged with finding the perfect match for one client. Matt has been a regular guest and relationship expert on the CBS The Early Show, Good Morning America, The Today Show, Fox Business News, The Wendy Williams Show, Dr. Drew on Call, CNN, Bethenny, E! and Rachael Ray

Titus is a contributor to The Huffington Post, Cosmopolitan OK! Magazine and has been featured in Elle, Men’s Health, Time Out New York, Forbes and Life & Style as the publication’s “Love Doctor.”

Titus has been a Brand Ambassador, Host and Keynote Speaker for companies such as Procter & Gamble, Lord and Taylor, Nokia, Pronovias, Spark Networks, The Learning Annex, and Bergdorf Goodman.

== Personal life ==
Titus was born in Houston, Texas, and grew up in upstate New York. He attended Temple University, earning a B.A. in Psychology and a M.S. in Exercise Physiology. Titus started the first chain of fitness centers and MedSpa facilities in the city of Philadelphia, before moving to New York City in 2005.

On 4 October 2007, Titus married Tamsen Fadal after three years of dating. The duo ran their own dating business and published books together. In 2012, the couple divorced.

Titus resides in Manhattan.

Titus will be launching a fragrance collection on HSN in 2015. He created the YOU fragrance collection.
