= Alyssa (album) =

Studio album by Alyssa Milano
- Released: October 25, 1989
- Recorded: 1989
- Genre: Pop, dance-pop
- Length: 42:26
- Label: Pony Canyon Inc./Canyon International/Marubeni Corporation
- Producer: Joey Carbone, Katz Nagasawa, Tom Milano

Alyssa Milano chronology
Look in My Heart (1989)	Alyssa (1989)	The Best In The World: Non-Stop Special Remix/Alyssa's Singles (1990)

Singles from Alyssa
- 1. "I Had a Dream" Released: October 21, 1989; 2. "Happiness" Released: c. 1989

Professional ratings
Review scores
Source	Rating
AllMusic	4/5 stars

Alyssa is Alyssa Milano's self-titled second studio album and major-label debut, released October 25, 1989. On this album she worked with most of the same producers she had worked with on the first album. The album was also released as a Picture Disc Edition.

The album peaked at No. 15 on the Japanese Oricon Albums Chart for a total of five weeks.

== Track listing ==
1. "I Just Wanna Be Loved" (Joey Carbone, Dennis Belfield) - 3:25
2. "I Had a Dream" (Joey Carbone, Dennis Belfield) - 3:45
3. "Step by Step" (Joey Carbone, Dennis Belfield) - 4:57
4. "Can You Feel It" (Joey Carbone, Tom Milano) - 4:37
5. "Destiny" (Joey Carbone) - 4:48
6. "Happiness" (Joey Carbone, Tom Milano, Mark Davis) - 3:41
7. "Give a Little Kindness" (Joey Carbone, Tom Milano) - 3:50
8. "Be My Baby/Tell Me That You Love Me - Medley" (Jeff Barry, Phil Spector, Ellie Greenich /Joey Carbone, Tom Milano) - 4:36
9. "Let My Love Show You" (Tom Milano, Gary Mallaber) - 3:39
10. "We Need the Children" (Alyssa Milano, Joey Carbone, Tom Milano) - 5:08

== Singles ==
#	Title	B-Side	Format	Date	(Japan)
1.	"I Had a Dream"	"Can You Feel It"	3" CD, 7" Vinyl	October 21, 1989	
2.	"Happiness"	"Give a Little Kindness"	3" CD	Late 1989	

== Album credits ==
=== Personnel ===
- Bill Purse, Joey Carbone, Tom Milano, Mark Davis, and John D'Andrea – synthesizers
- John Goux and Teddy Castelluci – guitars
- Alyssa Milano – lead vocals
- Beth Andersen, Gail Lennon, Andrea Robinson, Carmen Twillie, and Donna Davidson – background vocals
- Joel Peskin and David Woodford – saxophone
- Gary Mallaber – additional drums (10)
- St. John Eudes Children's Choir – choir (10)
- Judith Storey – choir director (10)

=== Production ===
- Producers: Joey Carbone, Katz Nagasawa, Tom Milano
- Arrangers: Joey Carbone, Tom Milano
- Engineers: Bill Purse (Windom Records), Eddie King (King Sound Studio), John D'Andrea (Midi Gritti Heaven Studio), Mark Davis
- Mixing: Leslie Ann Jones (Capitol Recording Studios)
- Drum & Synthesizer programming: Bill Purse, John D'Andrea, Tom Milano, Mark Davis
- Executive Producers: Harry Kaneko for Pony Canyon INC. and Sammy Masada for Marubeni Corporation
- Pony Canyon Producer: Masa Shigeno
- Management: Sam Kazama and Michael O'Connor
- Agency: Ford Models Japan

=== Design ===
- Styling: Beth Bickson & Lauren Ehrenfeld
- Photography: Michael O’Connor
- Hair & Makeup: Kenneth Gonzales & Johnny Hernandez
- Wall Paintings: Geof Millar

== Chart performance ==
Chart (1989)	Peak position
Japanese Oricon Albums Chart	15
