= Locked Inside a Dream =

Locked Inside A Dream

Studio album by Alyssa Milano
- Released: May 21, 1991
- Recorded: 1991
- Genre: Pop, dance-pop
- Length: 44:44
- Label: Pony Canyon Inc./Canyon International/Marubeni Corporation
- Producer: Joey Carbone; Jamey Jaz; Ren Toppano; Tom Milano

Alyssa Milano chronology
The Best in the World: Non-Stop Special Remix/Alyssa's Singles (1990)	Locked Inside A Dream (1991)	Do You See Me? (1992)

Singles from Locked Inside A Dream
- 1. "New Sensation" Released: April 21, 1991; 2. "No Secret" Released: c. 1993

Locked Inside A Dream is Alyssa Milano's third studio album, released on May 21, 1991. The CD comes with a 24-page booklet of photographs packaged in a cardboard slipcase. The CD single for "New Sensation" includes a television mix version of the song, which is a karaoke version with background vocals. The second single "No Secret" was released exclusively in France in 1993, two years after the album's official release. The B-Side was the album track "Your Lips Don't Lie".

The album peaked at number 19 on the Japanese Oricon Albums Chart for a total of five weeks.

In 1993, the album was released in France via Remark Records, where the title was changed to Alyssa Milano.

The first track "No Secret" was later covered by American-based Japanese girl group Zoom in 1999.

== Track listing ==
#	Title	Time
1.	"No Secret" (Joey Carbone, Jeff Carruthers, Mike Watson)	4:25
2.	"I Want Your Number" (Jamey Jaz, Ren Toppano)	4:50
3.	"Every Single Kiss" (Tom Milano, Charles M. Inouye)	4:00
4.	"Closer To You" (Jamey Jaz, Ren Toppano, Alyssa Milano)	4:00
5.	"Your Lips Don't Lie" (Jamey Jaz, Ren Toppano, Ron Freeland)	4:56
6.	"Through It All" (Jamey Jaz, Ren Toppano, Bobby Huff)	4:50
7.	"Say A Prayer Tonight" (Tom Milano, Charles M. Inouye)	4:56
8.	"Locked Inside A Dream" (Tom Milano, Charles M. Inouye)	3:57
9.	"Count On Me" (Joey Carbone, Dennis Belfield)	4:35
10.	"New Sensation" (Joey Carbone, Jeff Carruthers)	4:15

== Personnel ==
- Alyssa Milano – vocals, backing vocals (4)
- Joey Carbone – synthesizers (1, 9), backing vocals (9, 10), keyboards (10), arrangements (10)
- Jeff Carruthers – synthesizers (1), programming (1), arrangements (1, 10), keyboards (10), guitars (10)
- Jamey Jaz – keyboards (2, 4–6), backing vocals (2, 4–6), rap (5)
- Randy Waldman – keyboards (2)
- George Landress – synthesizers (3, 8), arrangements (3, 7, 8), keyboards (7)
- Myles E. Mangram – keyboards (3, 8), drum programming (3, 7, 8), percussion (3, 7), arrangements (3, 7, 8), synthesizers (7)
- Tom Milano – keyboards (3, 7, 8), arrangements (3, 7, 8)
- Christopher Bogan – guitars (2), bass (2)
- Vic Johnson – guitars (3, 7, 8)
- Tim Pierce – guitars (4–6)
- Charles M. Inouye – guitars (7, 8)
- John Goux – guitars (9)
- Ren Toppano – drum programming (2, 4–6), backing vocals (2, 4)
- David Boruff – saxophone (6)
- Maxi Anderson – backing vocals (1)
- Michelle Rohl – backing vocals (1)
- Mona Lisa Young – backing vocals (1, 10)
- Sandy Simmons – backing vocals (2, 5, 6)
- Joey Diggs – backing vocals (3, 7, 8)
- Lynne Fiddmont-Linsey – backing vocals (3, 7, 8)
- Fred White – backing vocals (3, 7, 8)
- David Lasley – backing vocals (9)
- Arnold McCuller – backing vocals (9)
- Linda White – backing vocals (10)

== Production ==
- Joey Carbone – producer (1, 9, 10), mixing (10)
- Jamey Jaz – producer (2, 4–6), engineer (2, 4–6)
- Ren Toppano – producer (2, 4–6), engineer (2, 4–6)
- Tom Milano – producer (3, 7, 8)
- Myles E. Mangram – co-producer (3, 7, 8)
- Eddie King – recording (1)
- Rob Ruscoe – engineer (1, 9)
- Tracy Chisholm – mixing (1, 9)
- Mark Wolfson – mixing (1, 9)
- George Landress – engineer (3, 8), recording (7)
- Michael McDonald – engineer (3, 7, 8), mixing (7, 8)
- Matt Gruber – mixing (3, 7), musical assistance (8)
- Michael Bronstein – recording (9)
- Tony D – recording (10)
- John Guggenheim – engineer (10)
- Paul Brown – mixing (10)
- Jeff Carruthers – mixing (10)
- Boon Tan – musical assistance (2, 4–6)
- Michael O'Connor – photography

== Singles ==
#	Title	B-Side	Format	Date	
1.	"New Sensation"	"New Sensation" (TV Mix)	3" CD	April 21, 1991	(Japan)
2.	"No Secret"	"Your Lips Don't Lie"	Cassette, CD 7"Vinyl	1993	(France)

== Chart performance ==
Chart (1991)	Peak position
Japanese Oricon Albums Chart	19
