= Sadhvi Siddhali Shree =

American film director

- Born: December 9, 1983 (age 42); Los Angeles
- Occupations: Jain nun, director, author, TEDx speaker
- Notable work: Stopping Traffic; Surviving Sex Trafficking; Balance: A Perimenopause Journey
- Website: siddhalishree.com

Sadhvi Siddhali Shree is a US based Jain nun, film director, author, TEDx speaker, Iraq War veteran and activist. She is mostly known for her documentaries Stopping Traffic (2017), Surviving Sex Trafficking (2022) which are based on the global problem of human and sex trafficking.

She is also the director and producer of Balance: A Perimenopause Journey (2026), an upcoming documentary series executive produced by Alyssa Milano that explores the challenges women face during the transition to menopause. In 2023, she co-directed the documentary For the Animals, which highlights the stray dog crisis in Houston.

== Biography ==
Sadhvi Siddhali Shree was raised in a Catholic family and she dissociated herself from the Catholic Church after completing her high school education. She enrolled herself as a medic in the US Army as a senior while studying in High School. At the age of 20, she first met with her spiritual guru Acharya Shree Yogeesh. Later she was asked to serve in the Iraq War. She suffered from slight PTSD after her deployment in Iraq as a US Army Combat Medic Sergeant from which she claimed Jain thoughts and guidance from her guru helped her to recover. Sadhvi Siddhali Shree was initiated by Acharya Shree Yogeesh in 2008 at the age of 24 becoming the first non-Indian to take initiation in Jainism outside of India. In the same year she joined Siddhayatan as the spiritual director. She also serves as the director of International Society of Human Unity. She is known to be the first "North American Jain female-monk".

== Activism ==
=== Human/Sex Trafficking ===
Sadhvi Siddhali Shree is known for her activism in several forms against human trafficking with an emphasis on the victims of sex trafficking. In her works, she collaborated with several international human right activists including Rosi Orozco, Cecilia Oebanda, Agnes De Coll etc.

Her documentary Stopping Traffic: The Movement to End Sex-Trafficking exposed the sex trade and human trafficking across the nations which operate not only in Europe, Latin American and Asian countries but also in the United States in its cities of Dallas, New Orleans, Houston, Los Angeles etc. As the aftermath post-publication of the documentary, the then president of United States Donald Trump promised to put "full force and weight" of the United States Government to curb the evils of human trafficking which comprises the illicit business worth more than 150 billion USD.

She is the director and producer of a documentary, "Surviving Sex Trafficking" which is based upon gathering survivors’ stories by herself and it addresses the global problem of sex trafficking. The documentary is a follow up of 2017's documentary, Stopping Traffic and focuses on the struggles of the survivors of sex trafficking as they fight to free themselves from their abusers. The documentary includes conversations with victims around the world revealing their stories and how those victims managed to escape and survive. In her recent interview with TMZ live she explained how we can help these victims by providing them a safe and comfort zone so that they can share their stories . The film unveils the fact that only 1% of the 45 million victims manage to escape. She was featured in the film, which became eligible for consideration for an Oscar of the 95th Academy Awards. Alyssa Milano, Jeannie Mai and Jeezy were the executive producers of this documentary and the production house was Siddhayatan Tirth.

In 2024, she was quoted in The Washington Post on survivor advocacy, stating: "They just want to be seen, they want to be heard, and they want to be believed." She was awarded "The Humanitarian Award" at the North Hollywood Cinefest, 2021 and "The President’s Award" at Beloit International Film Festival, 2022. She has made media appearances on Good Morning America, CNN and wrote an Op-Ed for Newsweek.

=== Gender Equality ===
Sadhvi Siddhali Shree has been described as one of the few adherents of Jainism who have challenged the traditional custom of positing a monk above a nun. She advocated her position with the challenge to such a hierarchy which in turn has invited welcome, praise and criticism from within the corners of Jain community. Sadhvi Siddhali Shree, while has been portrayed a number of times as an important personality for spreading Jainism in United States, particularly among youths, she said for Jainism to reach to more people, "they need to raise women’s status".

=== Perimenopause ===
Sadhvi Siddhali Shree is the director and producer of Balance: A Perimenopause Journey, a four-part documentary series executive produced by Alyssa Milano, scheduled for release in 2026. The series explores the physical, emotional, and social challenges women face during perimenopause, featuring expert insights and personal stories from diverse backgrounds. The project aims to raise awareness of this transitional stage in women's health and highlights the need for education, support, and open dialogue.

== TEDx ==
Sadhvi Siddhali Shree spoke on TEDx stage in 2022. Since then, she has become the first Jain nun to give a TEDx talk. In her talk, she shared her personal and spiritual journey which started as an Army Combat Medic in the Iraq War to becoming a Jain nun. She also shared her thoughts on promoting non-violence in the community.

== Books ==
- Shree, Sadhvi Siddhali. Shine Through Wisdom. United States: Siddhayatan Tirth, 2015. ISBN 9780984385461
- Shree, Sadhvi Siddhali. 31 Day Challenge to a Changed You. N.p.: Siddhayatan Tirth, 2009. ISBN 9780984385409
- Yogeesh, Acharya Shree. Chakra Awakening: The Lost Techniques. United States: Siddha Sangh Publishing, 2014. ISBN 9780984385447 (as editor)

== Filmography ==
Year	Title	Role
2017	Stopping Traffic	Director, producer, actor
2022	Surviving Sex Trafficking	Director, producer, actor
2023	For The Animals	Director, producer, actor
2026	Balance: A Perimenopause Journey	Director, producer, actor

== Further Sources ==
- Citizens Voices No. 12
- Jainism and Nonviolence: From Mahavira to Modern Times
- From Influence and Confluence to Difference and Indifference Studies on History of Religions, Mihaela Gligor
- Yogeesh, A. S. (2016). Soulful Wisdom & Art: 101 Thought-Provoking Quotes for Inspiration and Transformation. (n.p.): Siddhayatan Tirth.
- Yogeesh, A. S. (2020). Soul Talks: Power of Intention. (n.p.): Siddhayatan Tirth.
- Webster, R. (2012). Spirit Guides & Angel Guardians: Contact Your Invisible Helpers. United States: Llewellyn Worldwide, Limited.
- Fiedler, M. E. (2010). Breaking Through the Stained Glass Ceiling: Women Religious Leaders in Their Own Words. United States: Church Publishing Incorporated.
- Levine, P. A. (2012). Healing Trauma: A Pioneering Program for Restoring the Wisdom of Your Body. United States: Sounds True.
