= Look in My Heart =

Studio album by Alyssa Milano
- Released: March 21, 1989
- Recorded: 1988
- Studio: Capitol Recording Studios, Oasis Studios, Roxx Studios, Windom Records
- Genre: Pop, dance-pop
- Length: 30:30
- Label: Pony Canyon, Canyon International, TriStar
- Producer: Joey Carbone, Katz Nagasawa, Fonny De Wulf

Alyssa Milano chronology
Look in My Heart (1989)	Alyssa (1989)

Singles from Look in My Heart
- 1. "Look in My Heart" Released: Early 1989; 2. "What a Feeling" Released: May 21, 1989; 3. "Straight to the Top" Released: 1989

Professional ratings
Review scores
Source	Rating
AllMusic	3/5 stars

Look In My Heart is Alyssa Milano's first album, released March 21, 1989, when she was 16 years old. It was also released as a Color Picture Label CD and later as a 24Krt Gold Edition, which comes with a bonus track "Look In My Heart" (extended dance remix) identical to the version on The Best In The World album. Videos were filmed for the three singles that were released. A VHS video was also released that included the three videos and a short documentary, "Alyssa's Backstage Memories". After the credits roll, Milano's Japanese commercial for pasta can be seen—she is singing "Look In My Heart" in the commercial.

The album peaked at No. 68 on the Japanese Oricon Albums Chart for six weeks.

== Track listing ==
1. "Look in My Heart" (Joey Carbone, Dennis Belfield) - 3:30
2. "What a Feeling" (Joey Carbone, Dennis Belfield) - 3:47
3. "Da Doo Ron Ron/Magic in Your Eyes - Medley" (Jeff Barry, Phil Spector, Ellie Greenwich/Joey Carbone, Tom Milano) - 4:32
4. "You Lied to Me" (Joey Carbone, Tom Milano) - 3:50
5. "Kimi Wa Sunshine Boy" (Brian Richy, Mark Davis) - 3:27
6. "Born to Love" (Fonny De Wulf) - 3:11
7. "Waiting for My Star" (Joey Carbone, Tom Milano, Mark Davis) - 4:52
8. "Straight to the Top" (Joey Carbone, Dennis Belfield) - 3:21
9. "Look in My Heart" [Extended Dance Remix]* (Joey Carbone, Dennis Belfield) - 6:07

* bonus track on 24Krt Gold version only

== Singles ==
#	Title	B-Side	Format	Date	(Japan)
1.	"Look in My Heart"	"You Lied to Me"	7" Vinyl, 3" CD	Early 1989	
2.	"What a Feeling"	"Waiting for My Star"	7" Vinyl, 3" CD	May 21, 1989	
3.	"Straight to the Top"	"Da Doo Ron Ron/Magic in Your Eyes-Medley"	7" Vinyl, 3" CD	1989	

== Personnel ==
The following people are credited on the album:

- Dennis Belfield – drum and synthesizer programming
- Joey Carbone – arranger, producer, synthesizers
- Debra Devis – background vocals
- Mark Davis – arranger, additional instruments
- Fonny De Wulf – additional instruments, engineer, producer
- Ford Models Japan –agency
- John Goux –guitar
- Ross Hogarth – engineer
- Leslie Ann Jones – engineer, mixing
- Harry Kaneko – executive producer
- Sam Kazama – album notes, art direction, management
- Gail Lennon – background vocals
- Tampa Lann – background vocals
- Sammy Masada – associate executive producer
- Alyssa Milano – background vocals
- Tom Milano – arranger, executive producer, synthesizers, drum and synthesizer programming
- Kaz Miyake – design
- Katz Nagasawa – producer
- Michael O'Connor – management, photography
- Bill Purse – engineer, synthesizers, drum and synthesizer programming
- Brian Reeves – mixing
- Tom Sassa – assistant to executive producer
- Masa Shigeno – assistant to executive producer
- Bill Smith – engineer
- David Woodford – tenor and baritone sax

== Charts ==
Chart (1989)	Peak position
Japanese Albums Chart	68
