= The Best in the World: Non-Stop Special Remix/Alyssa's Singles =

Remix album by Alyssa Milano
- Released: February 21, 1990
- Recorded: 1988, 1989, 1990
- Genre: Pop, dance-pop
- Length: 39:42
- Label: Pony Canyon Inc./Canyon International/Marubeni Corporation
- Producer: Joey Carbone, Katz Nagasawa, Tom Milano

Alyssa Milano chronology
Alyssa (1989)	The Best in the World: Non-Stop Special Remix/Alyssa's Singles (1990)	Locked Inside a Dream (1991)

Singles from Alyssa
- 1. "The Best In The World" Released: c. 1989

Professional ratings
Review scores
Source	Rating
AllMusic	3/5 stars

The Best In The World: Non-Stop Special Remix/Alyssa's Singles is the first compilation album from singer Alyssa Milano consisting of remixed singles plus one new song ("The Best in the World"). Released on February 21, 1990, all the tracks are remixed into a continuous mix. This album was also released in a picture disc edition.

The album peaked at number 9 on the Japanese Oricon Albums Chart for a total of eight weeks.

== Track listing ==
#	Title	Time
1.	"The Best in the World" (Joey Carbone, Dennis Belfield)	4:07
2.	"Straight to the Top" (Joey Carbone, Dennis Belfield)	5:24
3.	"I Had a Dream" (Joey Carbone, Dennis Belfield)	5:40
4.	"Look in My Heart" (Joey Carbone, Dennis Belfield)	6:07
5.	"I Just Wanna Be Loved" (Joey Carbone, Dennis Belfield)	5:54
6.	"Happiness" (Joey Carbone, Tom Milano, Mark Davis)	5:57
7.	"What a Feeling" (Joey Carbone, Dennis Belfield)	6:33

== Singles ==
#	Title	B-Side	Format	Date	(Japan)
1.	"The Best in the World"	"Destiny"	3" CD	1990	

== Album credits ==
=== Production ===
- Producers: Joey Carbone, Katz Nagasawa, Tom Milano
- Arrangers: Joey Carbone, Mark Davis
- Engineers: Bill Purse, Bill Smith, John D’Andrea, Mark Davis, Eddie King, Ross Hogarth, Steve Bates, Craig Doubet
- Mixing: Brian Reeves at Oasis Studios
- Assistant mixing: Ian Minns
- Executive producers: Tom Sassa for Pony Canyon Inc. and Sammy Masada for Marubeni Corporation
- Pony Canyon Producer: Masa Shigeno
- Management: Sam Kazama and Michael O’Connor

=== Design ===
- Photography: Michael O’Connor

== Chart performance ==
Chart (1990)	Peak position
Japanese Oricon Albums Chart	9
