= Joey Carbone =

American musician

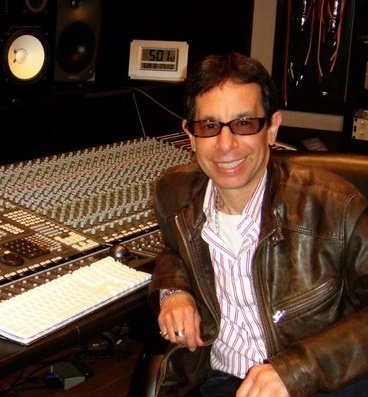
- Born: Brooklyn, New York
- Occupations: Music composer and producer

Joey Carbone is a composer, music producer, arranger and keyboardist. After a period as a session musician, Carbone became a music director for television programmes, such as Star Search. Since the 1980s he has worked as a producer for Japanese pop acts.

== Early life ==
Carbone was born and raised in Brooklyn, New York. When he was 16, Carbone was signed as a singer in a band with Richie Zito to Atlantic Records by one of Atlantic's founders, Jerry Wexler. Carbone took a summer job working at Atlantic, where he watched recording sessions by Aretha Franklin, the Rascals, Cream, and the Rolling Stones.

== Career overview ==
Carbone moved to Los Angeles and became a keyboardist and vocalist for recording sessions and concerts. He played keyboards for Kiki Dee, Elton John, Rick James, the Righteous Brothers, Eric Carmen, Rod Stewart, Cher, Air Supply, Andy Gibb, and Bette Midler, among others.

Carbone was the music director and theme composer for nine years for the television series Star Search. During his time with the show, he arranged, produced, conducted, or played piano for performances by contestants and guests, including Britney Spears, Christina Aguilera, Beyoncé, Alanis Morissette, LeAnn Rimes, and Justin Timberlake. He won a Cable ACE Award for composing and producing the theme song for the series It's Garry Shandling's Show, on which he served as music director.

He composed and arranged music for China Beach, Falcon Crest, Entertainment Tonight, and others. He has also produced and/or composed albums for Japan-based record companies for American singers including Little Richard, Alyssa Milano, Joseph Williams and Bobby Kimball of Toto, Bill Champlin and Jason Scheff of the group Chicago, John O'Banion, Edward Furlong, Irene Cara, Zoom, Mylin, Neil Sedaka, Tiffany, Warren DeMartini (Ratt), the Righteous Brothers, and Sam Moore of Sam & Dave.

He has focused on the Japanese music market, writing and producing songs for various artists. These include songs for KAT-TUN, Matsuura Aya, Smap, Wada Akiko, Crystal Kay, Akanishi Jin, Diana & the Treasures, Sexy Zone, Kanjani8, Tsuchiya Anna, Tackey & Tsubasa, N.E.W.S., Hey! Say! JUMP, Van Tomiko, Nakamori Akina, Nakayama Miho, Wink, Shonentai, Shibugakitai, Arashi, Aikawa Nanase, Mari Hamada, Lindberg, Inagaki Junichi, Koyanagi Yuki, Naomi Tamura, Eriko Tamura, and Masatoshi Ono. Commercial profiles state that he has achieved more than 80 Top 10 hits in Japan, and has composed hundreds of songs for Japanese television commercials, movies, and television programs, including the score for the films Project A-ko and Satomi Hakken Den (Legend of the Eight Samurai).

Carbone is a contracted advisor to both Sony Records and Avex. He is a lecturer and international advisor at Jikei Gakuen (Tokyo School of Music and Dance). He has given lectures at colleges and universities in the United States, Japan, and Taiwan.
