= Do You See Me? (album) =

Studio album by Alyssa Milano
- Released: September 18, 1992
- Recorded: 1992
- Genre: Pop, dance-pop
- Length: 35:05
- Label: Pony Canyon Inc./Canyon International
- Producer: Jamey Jaz, Ren Toppano, Tom Milano

Alyssa Milano chronology
Locked Inside a Dream (1991)	Do You See Me? (1992)	The Very Best of Alyssa Milano (1995)

Singles from Do You See Me?
- 1. "Do You See Me?" Released: c. 1992

Do You See Me? is Alyssa Milano's fourth and final studio album, released on September 18, 1992. It has a more mature sound and lyrics than the earlier albums. The album peaked at number 47 on the Japanese Oricon Albums Chart for a total of two weeks.

The album was released on CD by Canyon International in Japan, South Korea and Taiwan. It was also released on LP vinyl in South Korea only. In Japan it was packaged in a cardboard slipcase and with an extra 36-page booklet of photographs, just like her previous album, Locked Inside a Dream from 1991.

The album's only single was the title track "Do You See Me?". It was released on 18 September 1992 in Japan via Canyon International, as a 3" mini CD-single (snap-pack sleeve). The B-Side was the album track "If Only".

In the Republic of Korea, Milano appeared on the Saturday Night Music Show (MBC TV) on 26 September 1992, and performed the album track "Talk To Me".

== Track listing ==
#	Title	Time
1.	"Do You See Me?" (Tom Milano, Charles M. Inouye)	4:43
2.	"Talk To Me" (Jamey Jaz, Ren Toppano)	3:41
3.	"One Last Dance" (Jamey Jaz, Ren Toppano, Viqui Denman)	4:53
4.	"Puppet On A String" (Jamey Jaz, Ren Toppano)	5:02
5.	"Somewhere In Jamaica" (Jamey Jaz, Ren Toppano)	4:30
6.	"Waiting For Your Love" (Tom Milano, Charles M. Inouye)	4:34
7.	"If Only" (Jamey Jaz, Ren Toppano)	3:44
8.	"Everything You Do" (Tom Milano, Charles M. Inouye)	3:58

== Singles ==
#	Title	B-Side	Format	Date	
1.	"Do You See Me?"	"If Only"	3" CD	1992	(Japan)

== Chart performance ==
Chart (1992)	Peak position
Japanese Oricon Albums Chart	47
