= Stopping Traffic =

- Official Movie Poster
- Directed by: Sadhvi Siddhali Shree, Sadhvi Anubhuti
- Produced by: Siddhayatan Tirth
- Edited by: Jason Calhoun
- Production company: Siddhayatan Tirth
- Release date: September 29, 2017
- Running time: 79 minutes
- Countries: The United States, Philippines, Mexico
- Language: English

Stopping Traffic is a 2017 American documentary film directed by Sadhvi Siddhali Shree and produced by the team of monks at Siddhayatan Tirth.

The film explores the extensive reach of sex trafficking and sexual abuse especially of children in the United States and worldwide. Using commentary by victims and activists and investigations into practices in the US and abroad, the film traces the links between child sexual exploitation, pornography, social media, and sex trafficking. It calls on the viewer to join the movement to end sex trafficking.

Stopping Traffic made its world premiere at the Global Cinema Film Festival of Boston, a human rights festival, on March 11, 2017 where it won Best Picture prize.

== Synopsis ==
Stopping Traffic investigates the international crisis of human sex trafficking, particularly of minors, in a deeply personal point of view. It features interviews with child sexual abuse and sex trafficking survivors and veteran activists, and additional commentary from social service agents, doctors, academics, and young activists.

Citing a 2014 report by the International Labour Organisation, the documentary tells that 27 million people are being trafficked worldwide every year, delivering $150 billion (~$195 billion in 2024) a year to their captors. The story explores cases throughout the Philippines, Mexico, Thailand, Iraq, and major U.S. cities to provide raw images and first-hand documentation of human trafficking crime across the globe. It explores the practices within families and in the streets, explaining how a child or young adult are turned into being trafficked, at an average cost to a trafficker of $90, but with a potential to yield thousands. The creators establish the U.S. as the biggest source of sex traffickers' customers with the Super Bowl being the most popular event for scoring a trafficking arrangement.

The documentary also suggests nine specific ways in which the public can participate to help stop the trafficking, including writing to authorities, reporting alleged trafficking, and talking to friends about the subject.

== Production ==
The film is the first by Sadhvi Siddhali Shree, a 33-year-old Jain monk, U.S. Army Iraq War veteran and child abuse survivor, an international activist and author of 31 Days to a Changed You, Shine Through Wisdom. It was inspired and is based on the teaching of non-violence by Acharya Shree Yogeesh, who is the executive producer of the film. Jeannie Mai, co-host of the Emmy Nominated "The Real" daytime TV show, is also an executive producer of the film.

The documentary also features talking points by celebrities such as an actor Dolph Lundgren and other celebrities who raise awareness about human trafficking. The film is a volunteer endeavor funded by a Kickstarter campaign.

== Release ==
The film was screened as an 'Official Selection' at the 2017 Global Cinema Film Festival of Boston, Show Me Justice Festival, Fort Worth Indie Film Showcase, and Long Beach India International Film Festival 2017.

== Reception ==
Stopping Traffic won Grand Jury Prize and Best Picture at the 2017 Global Cinema Film Festival of Boston, Bronze Palm Award at Mexico International Film Festival 2017, Best Domestic Feature Documentary at Fort Worth Indie Film Showcase (FWIFS), Best Educational Film at Alaska International Film Awards, REMI 50 annual Worldfest-Houston International Film Festival 2017 and Winner Award of Merit at the Accolade Global Film Competition.

In January 2018 NowThis News selected the film during the National Human Trafficking Awareness Month, featuring the video of the two Jain monks and excerpts from the documentary. The video went viral on Facebook and has gained nearly 1 million views.
