= Siddhayatan =

Coordinates: 33.5693°N 96.0085°W

Siddhayatan, is a Jain-Hindu Tirth (pilgrimage site) in North America founded in 2008 by Acharya Shree Yogeesh. It is located on a 250-acre (1.0 km^{2}) site at Windom near Dallas, Texas, United States. Siddhayatan currently has miniatured versions of pilgrimage sites from India, including Kailash-Mansarovar, Lake Rakshastal, Ashtapad, Sammedshikhar, Bahubali, and thus is considered as a pilgrimage rather than a temple or place of worship or prayer. According to India Abroad, it is a “Spiritual Disneyland”. The tour of the entire pilgrimage is estimated to be 4 hours.

== History and functioning ==
Acharya Shree Yogeesh founded the tirtha in 2008. In 2015, an eastern European chapter was established at Estonia, Siddhayatan Mandir Estonia, which is also known as a Tirthankara Mandir. Siddhayatan Spiritual Retreat Center & Ashram in Texas is legally registered as Siddhayatan Tirth and is a 501(c)3 non-profit organization. Sadhvi Siddhali Shree and Sadhvi Anubhuti, the disciples of Acharya Shree Yogeesh are serving as the spiritual director and the operations director of the Tirtha. Siddhayatan provides the options for stress relief, reduce addictions, PTSD help, ashram living experience, and volunteer programs apart from the traditional spiritual, self-improvement educational programs and guidance. Siddhayatan is known for publishing an e-magazine Siddhaaloka.

== The Tirtha ==
Siddhayatan Tirth has an 11,000 sq ft Tirthankara Mandir, which includes both Shwetambar and Digambar murtis of the 24 Jain Tirthankaras, with 6 main statues, the largest being Parshvanath, which is also the largest Jain statue in the United States. In the smaller temples, it has Goddess Saraswati, Goddess Lakshmi, and Lord Ganesha. In the pilgrimage site, it features a 73” statue of Adinath, 73” sitting meditation statue of Shiva, 7 ft 5” statue of Gommteshwar Bahubali.

== See also ==
- Buddhism in the United States
- Hinduism in the United States
- Jainism in the United States
- Meditation
- Yoga

== Bibliography ==
- Yogeesh, Acharya Shree. Soul Talks: New Beginnings. United States, Siddhayatan Tirth, 2015. ISBN 9780984385454
- Yogeesh, Acharya Shree. Soulful Wisdom & Art: 101 Thought-Provoking Quotes for Inspiration and Transformation. N.p., Siddhayatan Tirth, 2016. ISBN 9780984385485
- Yogeesh, Acharya Shree. Awaken! A Handbook for the Truth Seeker. United States, Siddha Sangh Publications, 2011. ISBN 9780984385423
- Yogeesh, Acharya Shree. Soul Talks: Path of Purification. N.p., Siddhayatan Tirth, 2019. ISBN 9781733475006
- Shree, Sadhvi Siddhali. Shine Through Wisdom. United States, Siddha Sangh Publications, 2015.ISBN 9780984385461
- Shree, Sadhvi Siddhali. 31 Day Challenge to a Changed You. N.p., Siddhayatan Tirth, 2009. ISBN 9780984385409
