= Alyssa Milano =

American actress (born 1972)

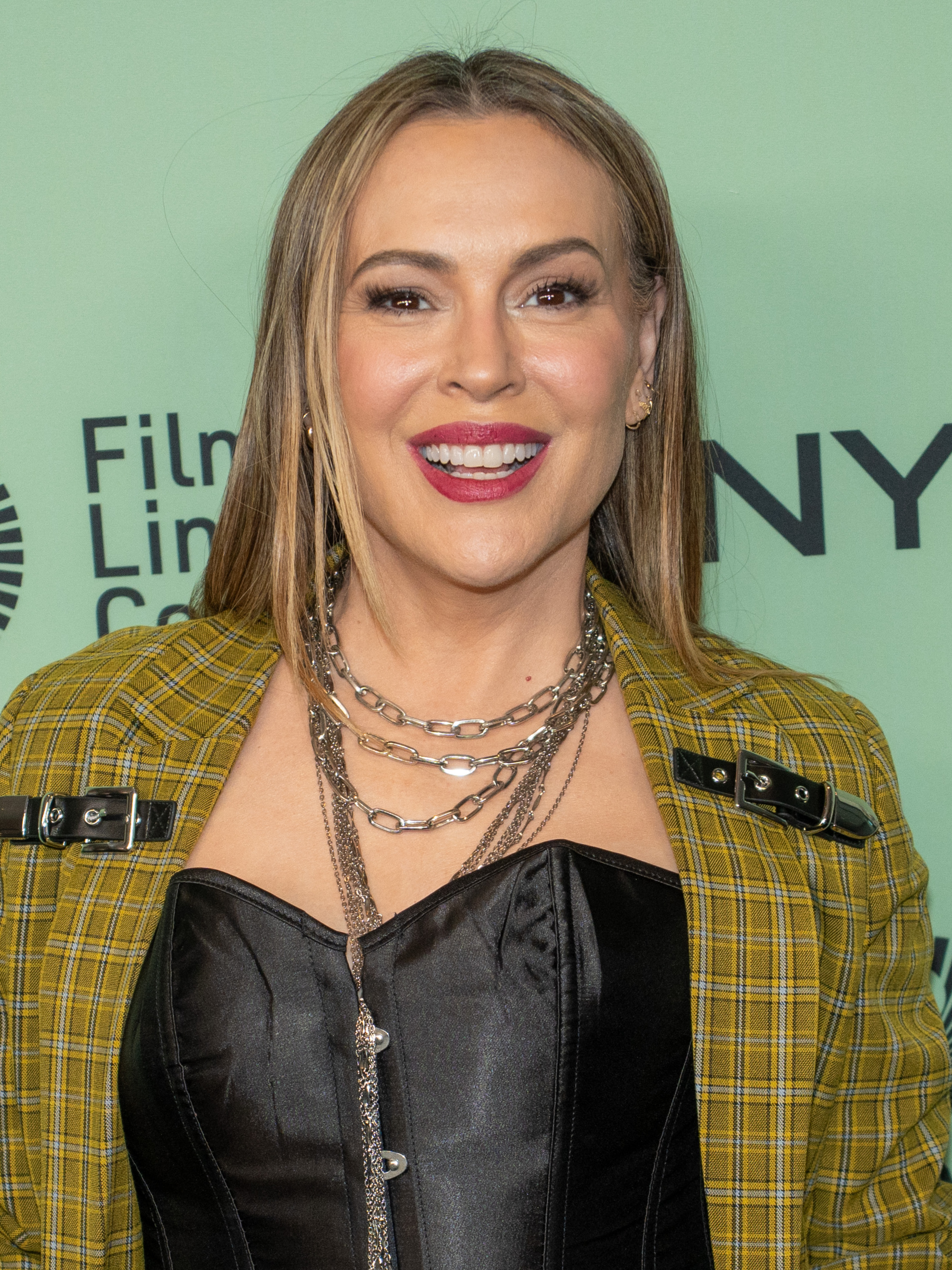
- Milano attending the 2025 New York Film Festival
- Born: Alyssa Jayne Milano; December 19, 1972 (age 53); Brooklyn, New York City, U.S.
- Occupations: Actress; activist; singer
- Years active: 1980–present
- Spouses: Cinjun Tate (m. 1999; div. 1999); David Bugliari (m. 2009)
- Children: 2

Alyssa Jayne Milano (born December 19, 1972) is an American actress, singer and activist. She has played Samantha Micelli in Who's the Boss? (1984–1992), Jennifer Mancini in Melrose Place (1997–1998), Phoebe Halliwell in Charmed (1998–2006), Billie Cunningham in My Name Is Earl (2007–2008), Savannah "Savi" Davis in Mistresses (2013–2014), Renata Murphy in Wet Hot American Summer: Ten Years Later (2017), and Coralee Armstrong in Insatiable (2018–2019). As an activist, Milano is known for her role in the #MeToo movement in October 2017. She was the replacement of the role of Roxie Hart, and did her own singing in Chicago.

== Early life ==
Alyssa Jayne Milano was born in the Bensonhurst neighborhood of Brooklyn in New York City on December 19, 1972. She and her family left Bensonhurst after a neighborhood shooting, relocating to Great Kills, Staten Island. She is of Italian descent and has a brother named Cory, who is a decade younger. She was raised Catholic, and still practices the faith.

== Career ==
=== 1980s and 1990s ===
Milano began her career at age seven, when her babysitter, without notifying her parents, took her to an audition for the national touring company of Annie. She was one of four selected from more than 1,500 girls. During the course of her work in the play, Milano and her mother were on the road for 18 months. After returning to New York, Milano appeared in television commercials, and performed several roles in off-Broadway productions, including the first American musical adaptation of Jane Eyre. While accompanying a friend from Annie to the office of a New York agent, the agent signed Milano. She does not feel that growing up in front of the camera harmed her childhood and has said: "I love my family very much – they've really backed my career. I consider myself to be normal: I've got to clean my room, and help in the kitchen". In August 1984, Milano made her film debut in the coming-of-age drama Old Enough, which she recalled as a "great way of starting out". The film was screened at the Sundance Film Festival, where it won First Prize.

Milano auditioned as the daughter of Tony Danza's character on the sitcom Who's the Boss? After winning the part, she and her family moved to Los Angeles, where the show was produced. It premiered on ABC on September 20, 1984. Throughout Who's the Boss?, Milano developed a close relationship with co-star Danza. Commenting on their early years together, Danza observed: "She was just the sweetest little girl of all time ... She became much like my daughter". The series established Milano as a teen idol, and provided her opportunities for other roles. Her education was split between school and an on-set tutor with whom Milano would work for three hours a day.

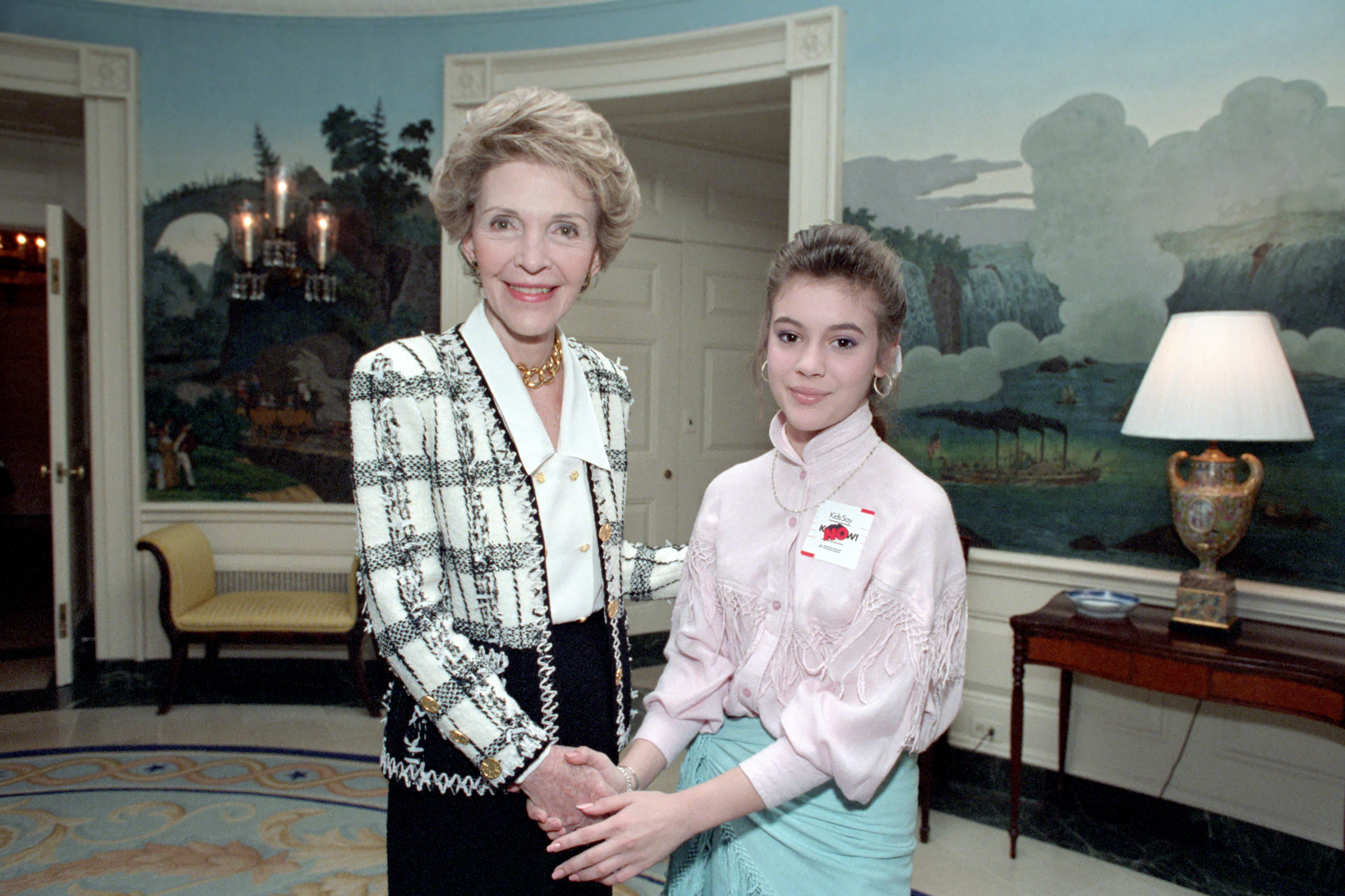
Milano with Nancy Reagan in 1987

At age 12, Milano co-starred in Commando (1985) as Jenny Matrix, the daughter of John Matrix (Arnold Schwarzenegger). Subsequently, she starred in the children's film The Canterville Ghost, which did not achieve much praise or attention and Variety magazine noted in its review: "Milano as the catalyzing daughter Jennifer adapts to the ghostly Sir Simon without a qualm; that, of course, is the true charm of the story, but Milano doesn't exhibit enough presence to match the droll, charming [John] Gielgud". A few years later this film was shown in Japan, prompting a producer to offer Milano a five-album record deal. Milano's albums, which she described as "bubblegum pop", scored platinum in the country, though she later criticised their musical quality.

On stage, Milano starred in Tender Offer, a one-act play written by Wendy Wasserstein, All Night Long by American playwright John O'Keefe, and the first American musical adaptation of Jane Eyre. She returned to the theater in 1991, producing and starring in a Los Angeles production of Butterflies Are Free from December 26, 1991, to January 19, 1992. Milano starred in two 1988 television films, Crash Course and Dance 'til Dawn. Both projects allowed her to work alongside close personal friend Brian Bloom, who worked with his brother Scott with her in episodes of Who's the Boss; this working camaraderie would later expand in 1993 when Milano made a cameo appearance in Bloom's film The Webbers. She produced a teen workout video, Teen Steam, and achieved some fame outside the US with her music career, which lasted until the early 1990s. Even though she scored platinum in Japan, Milano had no interest to pursue a music career in the United States: "I'm not interested in crossing over. I'd much rather have it released where it's appreciated than laughed at". Simultaneously, she wrote a weekly column called "From Alyssa, with love" for the teen magazine Teen Machine.

Milano played a teenage prostitute in the 1992 independent film Where the Day Takes You. The film, which focuses on a group of young runaway and homeless teenagers, was shot on and around Hollywood Boulevard and was met with positive critical reception. It was nominated for the Critics Award at the Deauville Film Festival, and won the Golden Space Needle Award at the Seattle International Film Festival. Although Milano feared that viewers would only recognize her as "the girl from Who's the Boss?", she was noticed by the media, which helped her land the role of Amy Fisher in the high-profile television film Casualties of Love: The "Long Island Lolita" Story, one of three TV films based on Fisher's shooting of Mary Jo Buttafuoco. Milano said that her portrayal of Fisher in the film, which was based on the Buttafuoco's point of view, "was the least 'Alyssa' of anything [she had] done". The film was shot from November–December 1992. She welcomed the cancellation of Who's the Boss?, as she was ready to move on to other roles and enthusiastic to "showcase" what she was able to do. Looking back on eight years of playing the same role, Milano commented, "Creatively, it's been very frustrating. I gave her more of a personality. I changed her wardrobe, cut her hair, anything to give her new life".

In the early 1990s, Milano auditioned for nearly every film role in her age bracket, including B movies, and finally tried to shed her "nice girl" image by appearing nude in several erotic films targeted at adults, such as Embrace of the Vampire, Deadly Sins and Poison Ivy II: Lily. She said the nude appearances taught her to begin requiring a nudity clause in her contracts giving her "full control" over all her nude scenes. In a 1995 interview, she explained her motivation for some explicit scenes in Embrace of the Vampire: "I'm not going to say that I was manipulated into doing things that I didn't want to do. I did it because it was a woman director and I felt protected. And I learned a lot as far as knowing where the camera is and what coverage they need so that it's not all explicit".

She starred in other roles, such as Candles in the Dark, Confessions of a Sorority Girl, The Surrogate, To Brave Alaska and Fear, which did not receive very positive reviews, although Jack Matthews of the Los Angeles Times called Milano's performance in Fear "very good". Milano starred in the lead role in Hugo Pool (1997). In late 1996, Milano was offered a role of Jennifer Mancini on the drama Melrose Place by producer Aaron Spelling: "We were looking for someone with sparkle. Alyssa was the perfect choice". She left early in season seven. In 1998, she was cast as Phoebe Halliwell, one of the three lead characters on Spelling's show Charmed. She and Holly Marie Combs became producers for the show during season four. The series ran for eight seasons, concluding in 2006. Also in 1998, she played Mark Hoppus's love interest in the music video for Blink-182's "Josie".

=== 2000s ===
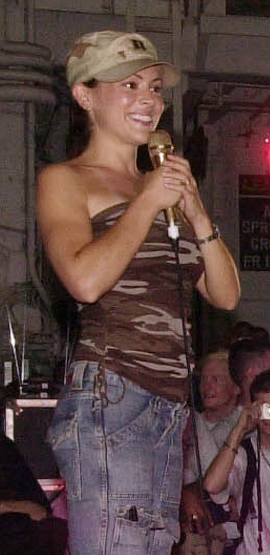
Milano in 2003

In the early 2000s, Milano played Eva Savelot in MCI Inc. commercials for that company's 1-800-COLLECT campaign. In 2007, Milano's commercial work included two 2007 television ads for Veet and Sheer Cover. That year, she filmed a pilot for ABC called Reinventing the Wheelers, which was not picked up for the 2007–08 season. That season she appeared in ten episodes of My Name Is Earl. Milano was part of TBS's special coverage installment Hot Corner for the 2007 Major League Baseball playoffs. A fan of the Los Angeles Dodgers, in April 2007, Milano began writing a baseball blog on the Major League Baseball's website. That year she reported at Fenway Park during the ALDS between the Boston Red Sox and the Los Angeles Angels of Anaheim.

The same year, she launched her signature "Touch" line of team apparel for female baseball fans, selling it through her blog on Major League Baseball's website. It also became available in 2009 through a boutique store located in Citi Field, the home of the New York Mets. She has an interest in the Los Angeles Kings, a National Hockey League team, and is involved with a related clothing line. In 2008, she expanded that to NFL football, as a New York Giants fan. Since Milano is from the same hometown as NFL Network's Rich Eisen, she revealed some of her family's connections with the Giants. In 2013, Milano expanded "Touch" into NASCAR.

On March 20, 2009, it was announced that Milano voiced Dr. Ilyssa Selwyn in Ghostbusters: The Video Game. In a 2010 interview she told the press that she had 'a blast' working on the game, although she recalled it being 'odd' having to grunt in a room alone. On March 24, 2009, her book on her baseball fandom, Safe At Home: Confessions of a Baseball Fanatic, was released. Milano has signed on to star in and produce My Girlfriend's Boyfriend, a romantic comedy in which she plays a woman with a relationship dilemma. Milano starred in the sitcom Romantically Challenged as Rebecca Thomas, a recently divorced single mother attorney in Pittsburgh who has not dated "since Bill Clinton was president". The series premiered on ABC on April 19, 2010. The series was cancelled after airing four episodes. Milano produced and led the cast of Lifetime's TV film Sundays at Tiffany's. which was her second collaboration with Lifetime, after Wisegal (2008).

=== 2010s and 2020s ===
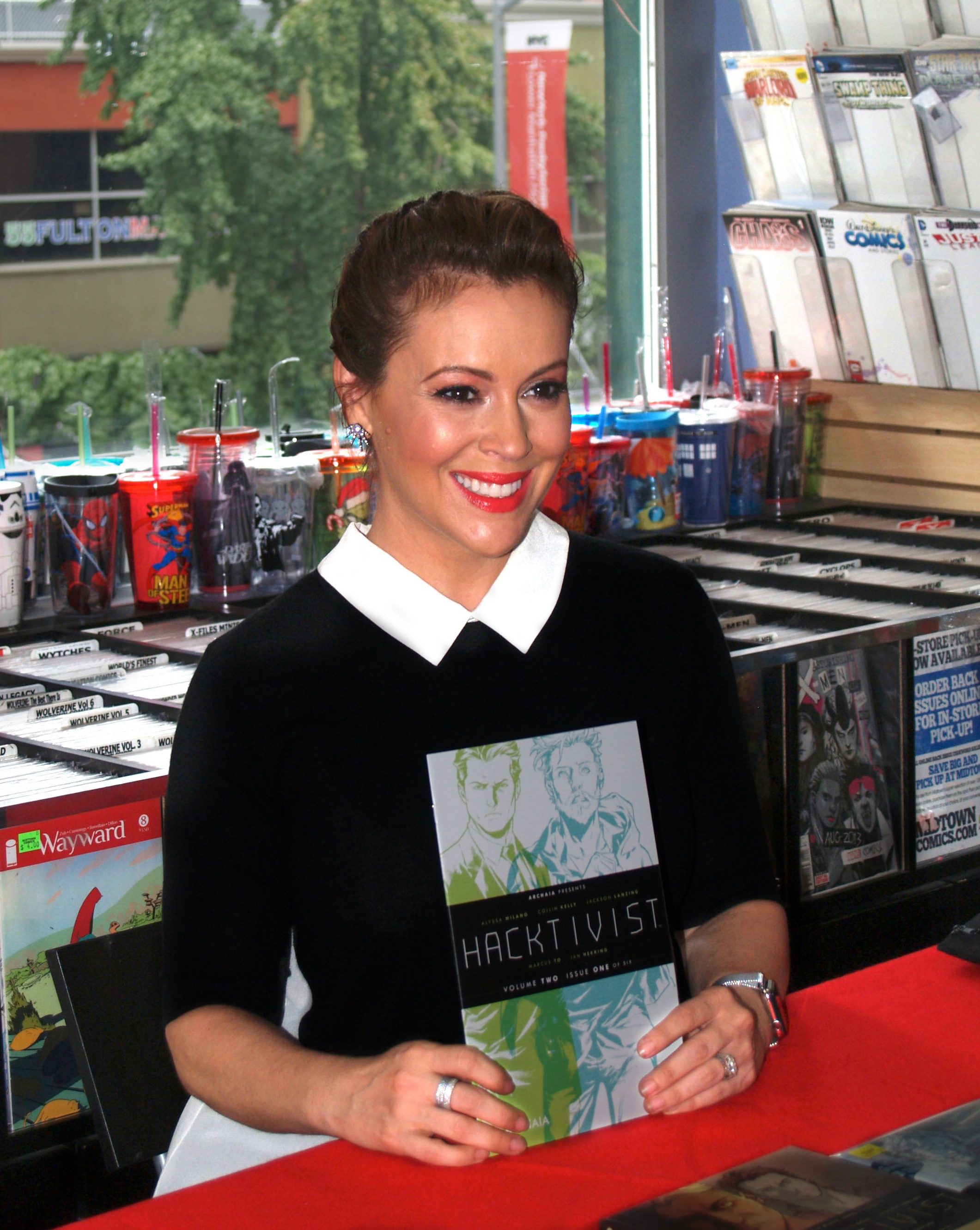
Milano promoting her graphic novel Hacktivist in 2015

In 2011, Milano appeared in two comedy films, Hall Pass and New Year's Eve. In 2013, Milano created the comic book series Hacktivist, which was written by Jackson Lanzing and Collin Kelly, drawn by Marcus To, and published by Archaia Entertainment. The book, which explores the modern world of hacking and global activism, is described as "a fast-paced cyber-thriller about friendship and freedom in a time of war". The publication was released digitally in late 2013, while the first print edition issue of the four-issue miniseries was published in January 2014. A hardcover edition collecting all four issues was released in July 2014. The series received positive reviews, as it holds a score of 8.1 out of 10 at the review aggregator website Comic Book Roundup.

In June 2013, she played Savannah Davis in ABC drama series Mistresses, which is about the scandalous lives of four girlfriends, but she left the show after season two, due to conflict between filming location and family issues. She signed on as host and judge of Project Runway: All Stars beginning with season three. On March 2, 2015, Milano was a guest host on The Talk. In September 2015, Milano began to make appearances as a brand ambassador for the preschool television channel Sprout, being billed as the network's "mom-bassador". In 2017 and 2018, Milano joined the cast of two Netflix comedy series: Wet Hot American Summer: Ten Years Later and Insatiable. In 2018 she was cast in the lead role in Tempting Fate, based on the best-selling book by Jane Green.

In 2019, she released a children's book Hope: Project Middle School Book which is part of her 'Hope' book series which she co-authors with Debbie Rigaud. Also in 2019, Milano began hosting the podcast Alyssa Milano: Sorry Not Sorry. The podcast deals with social and political commentary and frequently features actors, activists, and political luminaries. In 2020, Milano was a recurring star on the Quibi comedy The Now. In 2021, Milano was cast to star in the Netflix film adaptation of Nora Roberts' novel Brazen Virtue.

In October 2021, Milano's book Sorry Not Sorry was released. It contains 32 essays describing her activism and thoughts on current political and social issues. On October 29, 2021, she signed a first-look production deal with A&E Studios. She also signed a deal with the United Talent Agency (UTA) more recently, on December 13, 2021. Milano will perform the role of Roxie Hart in Chicago on Broadway in the fall of 2024.

=== Other work ===
She has appeared in television commercials for Wen, Candies, Veet, Hi-C and Atkins diet. She was a spokesmodel for Sheer Cover cosmetics.

== Activism ==
In the late 1980s, Milano contacted Ryan White, a preteen boy ostracized for having AIDS, and a fan of hers. She attended a party for him where she sat with him for six hours making friendship bracelets. They appeared together on The Phil Donahue Show, where Milano kissed White on the cheek to emphasize that people do not catch the disease through casual contact.

Since 2004, Milano has canvassed for national, state, and local candidates.

In October 2004, Milano participated in UNICEF's "Trick or Treat" campaign as its national spokesperson. She raised approximately US$50,000 for South African women and children with AIDS by selling her own and schools' photo work.

In support of PETA, she appeared in a 2007 advertisement for them, advocating vegetarianism, in a dress made entirely of vegetables.

In June 2007, The Sabin Vaccine Institute named Milano a Founding Ambassador for the Global Network for Neglected Tropical Diseases, an alliance formed to advocate and mobilize resources in the fight to control neglected tropical diseases, to which Milano donated US$250,000. She is also a UNICEF Goodwill Ambassador for the United States of America. Her field work for the organization has included a 2004 trip to Angola to speak with HIV-positive women and people disfigured by land mines during the country's civil war; a trip to India to meet displaced mothers living in squalor following the 2004 tsunami; and a 2010 trip to the settlement of Kolonia in western Kosovo to witness impoverished living conditions. Milano wrote on her blog that the latter trip was "the hardest experience I've had on a field visit", and described a waste dump close to the settlement where children spent time looking for metal to sell or scavenging for food.

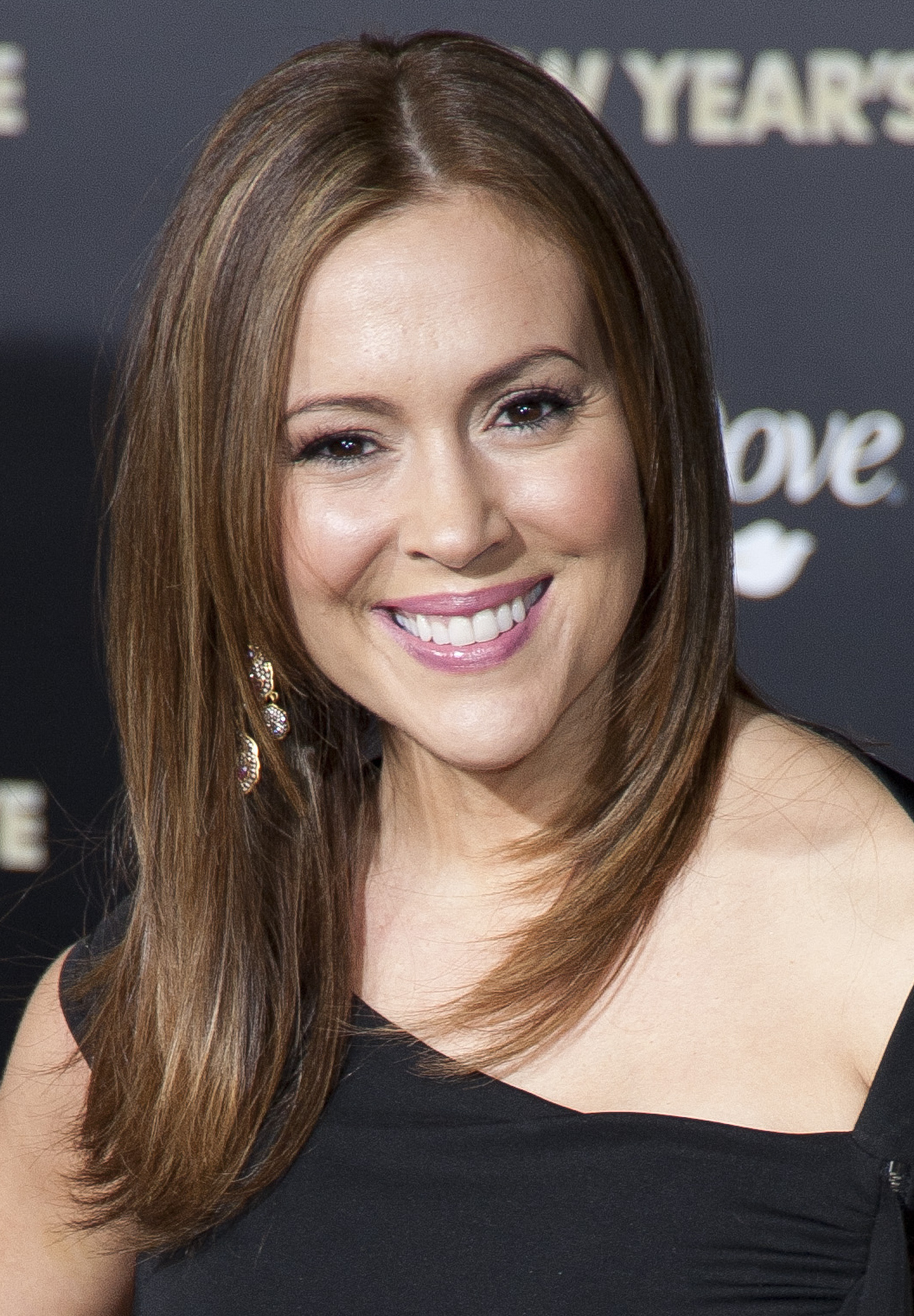
Milano in 2011

For her 37th birthday, December 19, 2009, Milano ran an online fundraising campaign for Charity: Water. Her original goal was to raise US$25,000, but a donation from her husband led to a total of over US$75,000 on December 18. The fundraiser ran until December 26. In September 2013, Milano released a parody of a celebrity sex tape on Funny or Die that drew attention to the Syrian civil war.

In 2014, Milano, with the South Korean rescue group, CARE, and The Fuzzy Pet Foundation in Santa Monica, helped rescue a South Korean Jindo mix dog, found covered in mange, chained, and raised for dog-meat.

On October 15, 2017, Milano posted the message that re-launched what is known as the #MeToo movement, which was started in 2006 by Tarana Burke. According to Milano, a friend suggested that she post a message on her Twitter account encouraging survivors of sexual harassment and assault to post #metoo as a status update. This was to gauge the widespread problem of sexual misconduct. She was inspired to bring awareness to the commonality of sexual abuse of women in the wake of Harvey Weinstein's expulsion from the Academy of Motion Picture Arts and Sciences for sex crimes against women in the film industry. Milano emphasized that the basis of her hashtag was to create a platform where women had an "opportunity without having to go into detail about their stories if they did not want to".

In 2018, she was announced as a co-chair of the Health Care Voter campaign. She wrote an op-ed in Time on why health care would decide her vote in 2018. In July 2018, and again in December 2020, Milano encouraged Twitter users to seek out VoteRiders to help eliminate confusion about voter ID laws.

Milano, who spoke at the 2018 Women's March, refused to participate in 2019, citing the failure of 2019 Women's March leaders Tamika Mallory and Linda Sarsour to condemn the homophobia, antisemitism, and transphobia of Nation of Islam leader Louis Farrakhan. In 2018, she was selected as one of the "Silence Breakers", who were picked as Time Person of the Year.

In May 2019, Milano advocated celibacy in the form of a sex strike in retaliation of a recently passed abortion law in the U.S. state of Georgia.

In October 2021, Milano was arrested during a voting rights demonstration outside the White House.

In November 2022, Milano announced via Twitter that she had exchanged her Tesla for a Volkswagen electric vehicle. She declared, "I gave back my Tesla, I bought the VW ev. I love it. I'm not sure how advertisers can buy space on Twitter. Publicly traded company's products being pushed in alignment with hate and white supremacy doesn't seem to be a winning business model." Critics were quick to point out Volkswagen's past relationship with the Nazi Party which founded the then state-owned company in 1937.

On May 28, 2024, Milano became an ambassador of the UNITED24 global initiative in support of Ukraine in the field of education and science.

== Political views ==
Following the Stoneman Douglas High School shooting, Milano co-founded #NoRA, a coalition of artists, activists, and survivors of gun violence in an effort to reduce the influence of the National Rifle Association of America in American government. In September 2019, Milano met with Ted Cruz and Fred Guttenberg to discuss gun violence. Guttenberg said this was "a really important day."

Milano helped raise money for Richard Dien Winfield, a Democrat in Georgia's 2018 10th congressional district race. Milano phone banked, a political campaign strategy to collect voter data and get out the vote, with Piper Perabo and drove people to the polls for the United States Senate special election in Alabama on December 12, 2017, to vote for Democratic candidate Doug Jones. Milano, with actor Christopher Gorham, drove voters to the polls during early voting and on March 27, 2017, for Georgia's 6th congressional district 2017 special election for Jon Ossoff, and she later posted photos of herself with the voters on Instagram. Milano and Gorham had been in the area for the pilot of Insatiable.

In 2015, Milano endorsed Bernie Sanders for president of the United States. In 2016, after the Democratic Party presidential primaries, she expressed support for presidential candidate Hillary Clinton. She was also involved in get-out-the-vote efforts for Rob Quist.

In March 2020, Milano endorsed former US vice president Joe Biden for president of the United States. She declined to withdraw her endorsement of Biden despite a sexual assault allegation against him. On April 27, Milano tweeted that she was "aware of the new developments in Tara Reade's accusation against Joe Biden. I want Tara, like every other survivor, to have the space to be heard and seen without being used as fodder. I hear and see you, Tara." This was after criticism of Milano's support for Biden where she appeared to backtrack on her previous stance of believing women. On April 28, in an op-ed for Deadline Hollywood, Milano reiterated her support for Biden and considered "Believing women was never about 'Believe all women no matter what they say,' it was about changing the culture of NOT believing women by default."

In October 2023, Milano signed an open letter from several artists to Biden, calling for a ceasefire of the Israeli bombardment of Gaza. In September 2025, she signed an open pledge with Film Workers for Palestine pledging not to work with Israeli film institutions "that are implicated in genocide and apartheid against the Palestinian people."

In 2024, Milano supported Ukraine and joined UNITED24 ambassadors in raising funds for Ukraine. That same year, Milano was listed on the board of directors for People For the American Way.

== Personal life ==
Milano was involved with actor Corey Haim from 1987 to 1990. Milano and her parents, together with his manager at the time, unsuccessfully tried to get Haim help for his addiction. In 1993, she became engaged to actor Scott Wolf, but they broke off their engagement the following year. She had two abortions while in the relationship with Wolf.

In 1998, Milano sued pornographic websites for publishing unauthorized nude photographs of her.

On January 1, 1999, Milano married Cinjun Tate, the singer from alternative rock band Remy Zero. They separated on November 20, 1999, and were divorced on December 1, 1999.

In a 2004 interview, Milano explained how she deals with her dyslexia: "I've stumbled over words while reading from teleprompters. Sir John Gielgud, whom I worked with on The Canterville Ghost years ago, gave me great advice. When I asked how he memorized his monologues, he said, 'I write them down.' I use that method to this day. It not only familiarizes me with the words, it makes them my own."

After a year of dating, Milano became engaged to Creative Artists Agency (CAA) agent David Bugliari in December 2008. They were married at Bugliari's family home in New Jersey on August 15, 2009. They had a son on August 31, 2011, and a daughter on September 4, 2014.

In 2015, Milano sold her condominium in West Hollywood and moved to Bell Canyon, California, where she owns land and nine horses, eight chickens, two rabbits, and five dogs.

In 2017, Milano's $10 million lawsuit against her business manager resulted in a cross-complaint.

In 2021, she was a passenger in a car crash. The car she was in was being driven by her uncle who had a medical condition and "became unconscious". The car veered into another lane and crashed. Milano was uninjured but her uncle was taken to the hospital.

In April 2022, Milano disclosed in an interview her diagnosis of long COVID. She described years of persistent symptoms following a presumed COVID-19 infection, including hair loss, shortness of breath and tachycardia, and has spoken publicly about living with long COVID.

== Filmography ==
=== Film ===
Year	Title	Role	Notes
1984	Old Enough	Diane	
1985	Commando	Jenny Matrix	
1988	Teen Steam	Alyssa Milano	
1989	Speed Zone	Lurleen	
1992	Where the Day Takes You	Kimmy	
1992	Little Sister	Diana	
1993	Conflict of Interest	Eve	
1994	Double Dragon	Marian Delario	
1995	Embrace of the Vampire	Charlotte Wells	
1995	Glory Daze	Chelsea	
1995	Deadly Sins	Cristina Herrera	Direct-to-video
1996	Poison Ivy II: Lily	Lily Leonetti	Direct-to-video
1996	Fear	Margo Masse	
1996	Public Enemies	Amaryllis	Direct-to-video
1996	Jimmy Zip	Francesca	Short film
1997	Below Utopia	Susanne	Also executive producer
1997	Hugo Pool	Hugo Dugay	
2001	Lady and the Tramp II: Scamp's Adventure	Angel	Voice; direct-to-video
2002	Buying the Cow	Amy	
2002	Kiss the Bride	Amy Kayne	
2003	Dickie Roberts: Former Child Star	Cyndi	
2005	Dinotopia: Quest for the Ruby Sunstone	26	Voice; direct-to-video
2007	The Blue Hour	Allegra	
2008	Pathology	Gwen Williamson	
2010	DC Showcase: The Spectre	Aimee Brenner	Voice; short film; direct-to-video
2010	My Girlfriend's Boyfriend	Jesse Young	Also producer
2011	Beverly Hills Chihuahua 2	Biminy	Voice; direct-to-video
2011	Hall Pass	Mandy Bohac	
2011	New Year's Eve	Nurse Mindy	Segment: "Hospital Story"
2018	Little Italy	Dora	
2022	Brazen	Grace	Also executive producer
2022	Give Me an A	Abigail Adams	Segment: "Abigail"
2023	Who Are You People	Judith	Also executive producer
2023	No Overnight Parking	Nicole	Short film
2025	Driver's Ed	Dr. Goodman	
2026	The Night Driver	Cheryl Jones	

=== Television ===
Year	Title	Role	Notes
1984–1992	Who's the Boss?	Samantha Micelli	Main role (196 episodes)
1986	The Canterville Ghost	Jennifer Canterville	Television film
1988	Crash Course	Vanessa Crawford	Television film
1988	Dance 'til Dawn	Shelley Sheridan	Television film
1989	Living Dolls	Samantha Micelli	2 episodes
1993	Casualties of Love: The "Long Island Lolita" Story	Amy Fisher	Television film
1993	At Home with the Webbers	Fan	Television film
1993	Candles in the Dark	Sylvia Velliste	Television film
1994	Confessions of a Sorority Girl	Rita Summers	Television film
1995	The Surrogate	Amy Winslow	Television film
1995	The Outer Limits	Hannah Valesic	Episode: "Caught in the Act"
1996	Mr. Show with Bob and David	Audience member	2 episodes
1996	To Brave Alaska	Denise Harris	Television film
1997, 2001	Spin City	Meg Winston	2 episodes
1997–1998	Melrose Place	Jennifer Mancini	40 episodes (seasons 5–7); recurring role (seasons 5–6), main role (season 7)
1998	Goldrush: A Real Life Alaskan Adventure	Frances Ella 'Fizzy' Fitz	Television film
1998	Fantasy Island	Gina Williams	Episode: "Superfriends"
1998–2006	Charmed	Phoebe Halliwell	Lead role (178 episodes); also producer (seasons 5–8)
2001	The Diamond Hunters	Tracy Van der Byl	Miniseries
2001	Family Guy	Herself (live-action)	Episode: "Mr. Griffin Goes to Washington"
2004	The Adventures of Jimmy Neutron: Boy Genius	April the Gorlock	Voice; episode: "Win, Lose and Kaboom"
2007–2008	My Name Is Earl	Billie Cunningham	10 episodes (season 3)
2008	Wisegal	Patty Montanari	Television film; also producer
2010	Castle	Kyra Blaine	Episode: "A Rose for Everafter"
2010	Kick Buttowski: Suburban Daredevil	Scarlett Rosetti	Voice; episode: "Frame Story/And... Action!"
2010	Sundays at Tiffany's	Jane Claremont	Television film; also executive producer
2010–2011	Romantically Challenged	Rebecca Thomas	6 episodes
2011	Young Justice	Poison Ivy	Voice; episode: "Revelation"
2011–2012	Breaking In	Amy	2 episodes
2013–2014	Mistresses	Savannah "Savi" Davis	Main role (seasons 1 & 2); 26 episodes
2017	Wet Hot American Summer: Ten Years Later	Renata Murphy Delvecchio	5 episodes
2018–2019	Insatiable	Coralee Armstrong	Main role (18 episodes)
2019	Tempting Fate	Gabby Cartwright	Television film
2019	Grey's Anatomy	Haylee Peterson	Episode: "Reunited"
2020	Celebrity Call Center	Herself	Episode: "The Shift With the Brony"
2020	You Are My Home	Sloane	Television film
2021	The Now	Sarah	3 episodes
2025	Elsbeth	Lisette "Pupetta" Del Ponte	2 episodes

==== TV Shows ====
Year	Title	Notes
1989	The Making of The Little Mermaid	Host; television special
2013–2016, 2018–2019	Project Runway All Stars	Host / Judge
2014	Hollywood Game Night	Episode: "Things That Go Clue-Boom in the Night"
2015	RuPaul's Drag Race	Judge (season 7)
2026	Balance: A Perimenopause Journey	Docuseries; also executive producer
2026	Impractical Jokers	Episode: "Celebrity Crushed"

=== Stage ===
Year	Title	Role	Notes
1979	Annie	Kate/July	National Tour
1982	Jane Eyre	Adèle Varens	Theatre Opera Music Institute
1983	Tender Offer	Lisa	Ensemble Studio Theatre, Off-Broadway
1984	All Night Long	Terry	Second Stage Theater, Off-Broadway
1991	Butterflies are Free	Jill Tanner	Court Theatre
2024	Chicago	Roxie Hart	Ambassador Theatre, Broadway

=== Video games ===
Year	Title	Voice role
2009	Ghostbusters: The Video Game	Dr. Ilyssa Selwyn

== Discography ==
- Look in My Heart (1989)
- Alyssa (1989)
- Locked Inside a Dream (1991)
- Do You See Me? (1992)

== Awards and nominations ==
Year	Association	Category	Work	Result
1985	Young Artist Awards	Best Young Supporting Actress in a Television Series	Who's the Boss?	Won
1986	Young Artist Awards	Exceptional Performance by a Young Actress Starring in a Feature Film – Comedy or Drama	Commando	Nominated
1987	Young Artist Awards	Best Young Female Superstar in Television	Who's the Boss?	Won
1988	Young Artist Awards	Best Young Actress in a TV Special, Pilot, Movie of the Week, or Mini-Series	Dance 'til Dawn	Nominated
1988	Kids' Choice Awards	Favorite TV Actress	Who's the Boss?	Won
1989	Kids' Choice Awards	Favorite TV Actress	Who's the Boss?	Won
1990	Kids' Choice Awards	Favorite TV Actress	Who's the Boss?	Won
2001	Annie Awards	Outstanding Achievement for Voice Acting in a Feature Production	Lady and the Tramp II: Scamp's Adventure	Nominated
2001	RATTY Awards	Outstanding Ensemble in a Science Fiction Series	Charmed	Nominated
2001	Wand Awards	Best Fight (Alyssa Milano and Shannen Doherty)	Charmed	Nominated
2004	Spacey Awards	Favorite Female TV Character (Phoebe Halliwell)	Charmed	Nominated
2005	Kids' Choice Awards	Favorite Television Actress	Charmed	Nominated
2006	Teen Choice Awards	Television – Choice Actress	Charmed	Nominated
2007	AOL TV	Top TV Witches (Phoebe Halliwell)	Charmed	7th place
2008	AOL TV	Top TV Witches (Phoebe Halliwell)	Charmed	7th place
2015	People's Choice Awards	Favorite Dramatic TV Actress	Mistresses	Nominated
2016	UNICEF Award	Spirit of Compassion Award	—N/a	Won
2017	Women's Choice Awards	SpotLight Choice Women Award	—N/a	Nominated
2018	GLAAD Gala Forum	Ariadne Getty Ally Award	—N/a	Won
