= Jeff Corey =

American actor, director, and teacher (1914–2002)

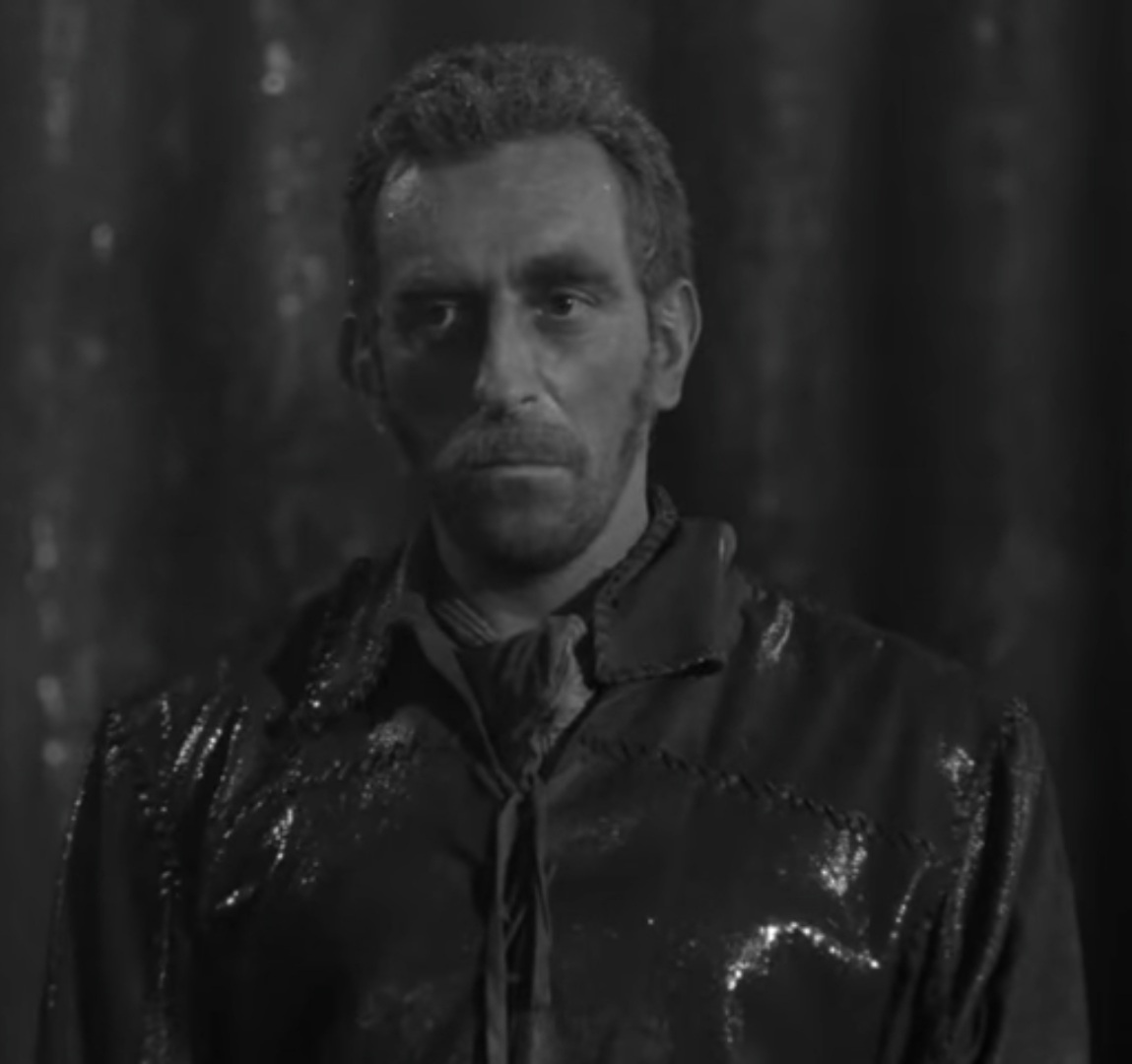
- Corey in Only the Valiant (1951)
- Born: Arthur Zwerling; August 10, 1914; New York City, New York, U.S.
- Died: August 16, 2002 (aged 88); Santa Monica, California, U.S.
- Occupations: Actor; television director; acting teacher
- Years active: 1938–2000
- Spouse: Hope Corey (m. 1938)
- Children: 3
- Website: jeffcorey.com

Jeff Corey (born Arthur Zwerling; August 10, 1914 – August 16, 2002) was an American actor, television director, and teacher. After being blacklisted in the 1950s, he became one of the most prominent and influential acting coaches in Hollywood, whose students included the likes of Kirk Douglas, Jack Nicholson, Robin Williams, James Dean, Jane Fonda, Peter Fonda, James Coburn, Leonard Nimoy, Cher, Barbra Streisand and Rob Reiner. He returned to film and television work in the 1960s, playing many character roles.

== Early life and education ==
Corey was born Arthur Zwerling in Brooklyn, New York to working-class Jewish immigrant parents. His father, Nathan Zwerling, was from Austria-Hungary, and his mother, Mary (nee Peskin), was from Russia. He attended New Utrecht High School in Brooklyn and was active in the school's Dramatic Society. He received a scholarship to the Feagin School of Dramatic Art, where he furthered his studies. Prior to his acting career, he worked as a salesman of sewing machines.

== Career ==
Corey made his professional stage debut in Leslie Howard's 1936 production of Hamlet, playing a spear-carrier and understudying for Rosencrantz. In the mid-1930s, he acted with the Clare Tree Major Children's Theater of New York. He worked with Jules Dassin, Elia Kazan, John Randolph, and other politically progressive and left-wing theatrical personalities in the Federal Theatre Project. Although he attended some meetings of the Communist Party, Corey never joined.

=== Hollywood ===
When Corey began making films in 1937, his agent suggested that he change his name from Arthur Zwerling, and he did so. His first roles were for Columbia Pictures, which usually offered a promising actor steady work as a contract player in the studio's stock company. If Corey was offered a contract, he declined it and worked in only two Columbia features. He then began freelancing for various studios, playing nondescript "everyman" parts. In RKO's Kay Kyser musical comedy You'll Find Out, he appears near the beginning as a quiz-show contestant (giving his name as Jeff Corey). His steadiest work during this period was at 20th Century-Fox, where he played a variety of minor roles from 1941 to 1943. This became a hallmark of his screen work: he could fill any role a script called for, with a quiet manner and an undistinguished, almost anonymous face. As Corey himself reflected, "I'm glad there has been such a diversity of roles in my career. I think I'm one actor who has not been pigeonholed or typecast." Corey might have gone farther at Fox but his career was interrupted by military service in the U. S. Navy during World War II.

He resumed movie work in 1946, back at Fox, but he also accepted freelance jobs at other studios. He also worked in network radio. Corey portrayed Detective Lieutenant Ybarra on the crime drama The Adventures of Philip Marlowe on NBC (1947) and CBS (1948–1951).

One of his more prominent screen credits was the feature film Superman and the Mole Men (1951), which was later edited as "The Unknown People", a two-part episode of the television series The Adventures of Superman. His portrayal of a xenophobic vigilante coincidentally reflected what was about to happen to him.

=== Blacklisted and teacher ===
Corey's career was again interrupted in the early 1950s, when he was summoned before the House Un-American Activities Committee. He refused to give names of alleged Communists and subversives in the entertainment industry and went so far as to ridicule the panel by offering critiques of the testimony of the previous witnesses. That led to his being blacklisted for 12 years. "Most of us were retired Reds. We had left it, at least I had, years before," Corey told Patrick McGilligan, the co-author of Tender Comrades: A Backstory of the Hollywood Blacklist, who teaches film at Marquette University. "The only issue was, did you want to just give them their token names so you could continue your career, or not? I had no impulse to defend a political point of view that no longer interested me particularly... They just wanted two new names so they could hand out more subpoenas."

While blacklisted, Corey drew upon his experience in various actors' workshops (including the Actors' Lab, which he helped establish) by seeking work as an acting teacher. He soon became one of the most influential teachers in Hollywood. His students, at various times, included Kirk Douglas, Jack Nicholson, Robin Williams, Robert Blake, Carol Burnett, James Coburn, Richard Chamberlain, James Dean, Jane Fonda, Peter Fonda, Michael Forest, James Hong, Luana Anders, Pat Boone, Sally Kellerman, Shirley Knight, Bruce Lee, Cher, Roger Corman, Anthony Perkins, Leonard Nimoy, Rita Moreno, Barbra Streisand, Anthony Perkins, Rob Reiner, and Robert Towne.

Corey was also a Professor of Theatre Arts at California State University, Northridge, and at various times was an artist-in-residence at Ball State University, Chapman University, University of Texas at Austin, and New York University. He also conducted acting seminars at Emory University and the Vancouver Film School.

=== Back to work in the 1960s ===
In 1962, Corey began working in films again, and remained active into the 1990s. He played Hoban in The Cincinnati Kid (1965); Tom Chaney, the principal villain in True Grit (1969); and Sheriff Bledsoe in Butch Cassidy and the Sundance Kid (also 1969), who says to the title characters, "I never met a soul more affable than you, Butch, or faster than the Kid, but you're still nothing but two-bit outlaws on the dodge. It's over, don't you get that? Your times is over and you're gonna die bloody, and all you can do is choose where." In Seconds (1966), a science-fiction drama film directed by John Frankenheimer and starring Rock Hudson, Corey with Will Geer and John Randolph played wealthy executives who opt to restart their lives with new identities.

Corey played a police detective in the psychological thriller The Premonition (1976) and he reprised the role of Sheriff Bledsoe in the prequel Butch and Sundance: The Early Days (1979). He also played Wild Bill Hickok in Little Big Man (1970). Corey directed some of the screen tests for Superman (1978), which can be seen in the DVD extras, and played Lex Luthor in several tryouts.

=== Television ===
Corey made guest appearances on many television series. He appeared as murder victim Carl Bascom in the Perry Mason episode, "The Case of the Reckless Rockhound" (1964). He was featured on science-fiction series, too, including an episode of The Outer Limits ("O.B.I.T.", 1963) in which he played Byron Lomax; Star Trek ("The Cloud Minders", 1969) in which he played High Advisor Plasus; as Caspay in Beneath the Planet of the Apes (1970), and Babylon 5 ("Z'ha'dum", 1996) in which he played Justin.

Corey played Dr. Miles Talmadge on Rod Serling's Night Gallery season-one episode one, "The Dead Man", on December 16, 1970. He discussed his television work on Night Gallery in an interview in February 1973 aboard the SS Universe Campus of Chapman College. He was proudest of this work, for which he received an Emmy nomination.

During the 1970s, Corey also played Dr. Scott Rivers, an older man with whom Carol Kester (the character played by Marcia Wallace) becomes romantically involved, in 1973 in "Old Man Rivers," episode 31 of The Bob Newhart Show. In 1974, he appeared in "Murder on the 13th Floor," episode 6 of the James Stewart legal drama Hawkins. He also appeared in the short-lived 1974 series Paper Moon, a comedy about a father and his presumed daughter roaming through the American Midwest during the Great Depression based on the 1973 film of the same name.

In the 1980s, Corey was in a 1984 episode of Bob Newhart's show Newhart playing a judge. He also worked with writer-producer Reinhold Weege: two guest roles in Barney Miller and two more in Night Court (in one of the Night Court shows he insists he is Santa Claus). Corey was the voice of the villain Silvermane (in elderly form) in Spider-Man: The Animated Series in 1994.

== Memoir ==
His memoir, Improvising Out Loud: My Life Teaching Hollywood How To Act, which he wrote with his daughter, Emily Corey, is published by the University Press of Kentucky. His longtime friend and former student Leonard Nimoy wrote the book's foreword.

== Personal life and death ==
Corey married his wife Hope (nee Victorson) in 1938. They had three children.

Corey died on August 16, 2002, aged 88, after a fall.

== Filmography ==
=== Film ===
- I Am the Law (1938) as Thug (uncredited)
- ...One Third of a Nation... (1939) as Man in Crowd at Fir (uncredited)
- Third Finger, Left Hand (1940) as Johann (uncredited)
- Bitter Sweet (1940) as Second Man on Stairs (uncredited)
- You'll Find Out (1940) as Mr. Corey (uncredited)
- Petticoat Politics (1941) as Henry Trotter
- The Lady from Cheyenne (1941) as Reporter (uncredited)
- Mutiny in the Arctic (1941) as The Cook
- The Devil and Daniel Webster (1941) as Tom Sharp (uncredited)
- You Belong to Me (1941) as Mr. Greener (uncredited)
- Paris Calling (1941) as Secretary (uncredited)
- North to the Klondike (1942) as Lafe Jordan
- Roxie Hart (1942) as Orderly (uncredited)
- Who Is Hope Schuyler? (1942) as Medical Examiner
- The Man Who Wouldn't Die (1942) as Coroner Tim Larsen
- Small Town Deb (1942) as Hector
- Syncopation (1942) as Kit's Attorney (uncredited)
- The Postman Didn't Ring (1942) as Harwood Green
- Girl Trouble (1942) as Mr. Mooney (uncredited)
- Tennessee Johnson (1942) as Captain (uncredited)
- Frankenstein Meets the Wolf Man (1943) as Crypt Keeper (uncredited)
- The Moon Is Down (1943) as Albert (uncredited)
- Aerial Gunner (1943) as Flight Crew Member (uncredited)
- My Friend Flicka (1943) as Tim Murphy
- Somewhere in the Night (1946) as Bank Teller (uncredited)
- Joe Palooka, Champ (1946) as Reporter (uncredited)
- It Shouldn't Happen to a Dog (1946) as Sam Black (uncredited)
- Rendezvous with Annie (1946) as Howard (uncredited)
- The Killers (1946) as "Blinky" Franklin (uncredited)
- The Shocking Miss Pilgrim (1947) as Stenographer (uncredited)
- California (1947) as Clem (uncredited)
- Ramrod (1947) as Bice
- Miracle on 34th Street (1947) as Reporter (uncredited)
- Brute Force (1947) as Freshman Stack
- Hoppy's Holiday (1947) as Jed
- Unconquered (1947) as Trapper (uncredited)
- The Flame (1947) as Stranger (uncredited)
- The Gangster (1947) as Karty's Brother-in-Law (uncredited)
- Alias a Gentleman (1948) as Zu
- The Wreck of the Hesperus (1948) as Joshua Hill
- Let's Live Again (1948) as Bartender
- Homecoming (1948) as Cigarette Smoker (uncredited)
- I, Jane Doe (1948) as Immigration Officer (uncredited)
- Canon City (1948) as Carl Schwartzmiller
- A Southern Yankee (1948) as Union Cavalry Sergeant (uncredited)
- Joan of Arc (1948) as Prison Guard
- Kidnapped (1948) as Shaun
- Wake of the Red Witch (1948) as Mr. Loring
- Hideout (1949) as Beecham
- City Across the River (1949) as Police Lieutenant Louie Macon
- Roughshod (1949) as Jed Graham
- Home of the Brave (1949) as Doctor
- Follow Me Quietly (1949) as Police Sgt. Art Collins
- Scene of the Crime (1949) as Man Arrested with Switchblade (uncredited)
- Bagdad (1949) as Mohammed Jao
- The Nevadan (1950) as Bart
- Singing Guns (1950) as Richards
- The Outriders (1950) as Keeley
- Rock Island Trail (1950) as Abraham Lincoln
- Bright Leaf (1950) as John Barton
- The Next Voice You Hear... (1950) as Freddie Dibson
- Fourteen Hours (1951) as Police Sgt. Farley
- Rawhide (1951) as Luke Davis
- Only the Valiant (1951) as Joe Harmony
- New Mexico (1951) as Coyote
- Sirocco (1951) as Feisal (uncredited)
- The Prince Who Was a Thief (1951) as Emir Mokar
- Never Trust a Gambler (1951) as Lou Brecker
- Red Mountain (1951) as Sgt. Skee
- Superman and the Mole Men (1951) as Luke Benson
- The Balcony (1963) as Bishop
- The Yellow Canary (1963) as Joe Pyle
- Lady in a Cage (1964) as George L. Brady Jr. aka Repent
- The Treasure of the Aztecs (1965) as Abraham Lincoln
- Pyramid of the Sun God (1965) (uncredited)
- Once a Thief (1965) as Lt. Kebner SFPD
- Mickey One (1965) as Larry Fryer
- The Cincinnati Kid (1965) as Hoban
- Seconds (1966) as Mr. Ruby
- In Cold Blood (1967) as Mr. Hickock
- The Boston Strangler (1968) as John Asgeirsson
- Impasse (1969) as Wombat
- True Grit (1969) as Tom Chaney
- Butch Cassidy and the Sundance Kid (1969) as Sheriff Bledsoe
- Beneath the Planet of the Apes (1970) as Caspay
- Getting Straight (1970) as Dr. Edward Willhunt
- They Call Me Mister Tibbs! (1970) as Captain Marden
- Cover Me Babe (1970) as Paul
- Little Big Man (1970) as Wild Bill Hickok
- Clay Pigeon (1971) as Clinic Doctor
- Shoot Out (1971) as Trooper
- Catlow (1971) as Merridew
- Something Evil (1972, TV Movie) as Gehrmann
- Paper Tiger (1975) as Mr. King
- Banjo Hackett: Roamin' Free (1976) as Judge Janeway
- The Premonition (1976) as Lieutenant Mark Denver
- The Last Tycoon (1976) as Doctor
- Rooster: Spurs of Death! (1977) as Kink
- Moonshine County Express (1977) as Hagen
- Curse of the Black Widow (1977, TV Movie) as Aspa Soldado
- Oh, God! (1977) as Rabbi Silverstone
- Captains Courageous (1977, TV Movie) as Salters
- Jennifer (1978) as Luke Baylor
- The Wild Geese (1978) as Mr. Martin
- The Pirate (1978, TV Movie) as Prince Feiyad
- Butch and Sundance: The Early Days (1979) as Sheriff Ray Bledsoe
- Up River (1979) as Bagshaw
- Battle Beyond the Stars (1980) as Zed
- The Sword and the Sorcerer (1982) as Craccus
- Conan the Destroyer (1984) as Grand Vizier
- Creator (1985) as Dean Harrington
- Fist of the North Star (1986, Streamline) as Ryuuken / Narrator (1991) (English version, voice)
- Tajna manastirske rakije (1988) as Colonel Frazier
- Messenger of Death (1988) as Willis Beecham
- Bird on a Wire (1990) as Lou Baird
- The Judas Project (1990) as Poneras
- Ruby Cairo (1992) as Joe Dick
- Beethoven's 2nd (1993) as Gus, the Janitor
- Color of Night (1994) as Ashland
- Surviving the Game (1994) as Hank
- American Hero (1997)
- Ted (1998) as Professor

=== Television ===
- The Outer Limits – season one, episode seven – "O.B.I.T." – Byron Lomax (1963)
- The Wild Wild West – two episodes:
  - "The Night of a Thousand Eyes" – Captain Ansel Coffin (1965)
  - "The Night of the Underground Terror" – Colonel Tacitus Mosely (1968)
- Bonanza – two episodes:
  - Season eight, episode 13 – "The Bridegroom" – Tuck Dowling (1966)
  - Season 12, episode 15 – "A Single Pilgrim" – Frank Brennan (1971)
- Star Trek – season three, episode 21 – "The Cloud Minders" – Plasus (1969)
- Hawaii Five-O – two episodes:
  - "King of the Hill" – Doctor William Hanson (1969)
  - "Highest Castle, Deepest Grave" – Duncan (1971)
- Gunsmoke – episode – "The Night Riders" – Judge Procter (1969)
- Night Gallery – episode – "The Dead Man" – Dr. Miles Talmadge (1970)
- Mannix – episode – "Overkill" – Paul Sorenson (1971)
- Alias Smith and Jones – two episodes (1972):
  - "The Men That Corrupted Hadleyburg" (Director)
  - "The Day the Amnesty Came Through" – Governor George W. Baxter
- Walt Disney's Wonderful World of Color – episode – "The High Flying Spy: Part 1" – Gen. McClellan (1972)
- Search – episode – "Short Circuit" – Dr. Carl Moen (1972)
- Police Story – episode – "The Big Walk" – Defense Attorney (1973)
- Owen Marshall: Counselor at Law – episode – "Poor Children of Eve" – Monsignor Morell (1973)
- The Bob Newhart Show – episode – "Old Man Rivers" – Doctor Scott Rivers (1973)
- Hawkins – episode – "Murder on the 13th Floor" (1974)
- Paper Moon – episode – "Impostor" – Jeb Crew (1974)
- The Six Million Dollar Man – episode – "Lost Love" – Orin Thatcher (1975)
- Starsky and Hutch – episode – "Death Ride" – Andrew Mello (1975)
- Kojak – episode – "A House of Prayer, a Den of Thieves" – Frank Raynor (1975)
- McCloud – episode – "Our Man in the Harem" – Sheik Kipal (1976)
- The Bionic Woman – episode – "The Night Demon" – Thomas Bearclaw (1977)
- Testimony of Two Men – William Simpson (1977)
- Greatest Heroes of the Bible – episode – "David & Goliath" – Saul (1978)
- Fantasy Island – episode – "Let the Goodtimes Roll/Nightmare/The Tiger" – Tibur (uncredited) (1978)
- Barney Miller – two episodes:
  - "The Prisoner" – Ralph Timmons (1978)
  - "The Desk" – Caleb Webber as Amish farmer from Pennsylvania (1979)
- One Day at a Time – episode – "Grandma Leaves Grandpa" – Mr. Romano (1979)
- Little House on the Prairie – two episodes:
  - "Barn Burner" – Judge Parker (1979)
  - "Blind Justice" – Edgar Mills (1981)
- Knots Landing – episode – "The Block Party" – Peter Mackenzie (1981)
- Night Court – two episodes:
  - "Santa Goes Downtown" – Santa (1984)
  - "The Night Off" – Judge Hirsch (1986)
- Simon & Simon – episode – "Slither" – Police Sgt. Spencer (1985)
- The A-Team – episode – "Family Reunion" – A.J. Bancroft (1986)
- Perfect Strangers – episode – "Taking Stock" – Henry Casselman (1987)
- War of the Worlds – episode – "Eye for an Eye" – Francis Flannery (1988)
- Jake and the Fatman – episode – "It All Depends on You" – Judge Ralph Colella (1989)
- Roseanne - Season 1, Episode 21 - "Death and Stuff" - Salesman (1989)
- Beauty and the Beast – episode – "The Reckoning" – Winston Burke (1990)
- Picket Fences – episode – "This Little Piggy" – The Captain (1995)
- The Marshal – season one, episode seven – "The Bounty Hunter" – Alex Cooper (1995)
- Spider-Man: The Animated Series – two seasons, five episodes – voice of Elderly Silvermane (1995–1997):
  - Season two (Neogenic Nightmare)
    - "Chapter 1: The Insidious Six"
    - "Chapter 2: Battle of the Insidious Six"
    - "Chapter 11: Tablet of Time"
    - "Chapter 12: Ravages of Time"
  - Season four (Partners in Danger)
    - "Chapter 5: Partners"
- Babylon 5 – season three (Point of No Return), episode 22 – "Z'ha'dum" – Justin (1996)

== Other credits ==
- The Adventures of Philip Marlowe – radio series – Lieutenant Ebarra ("various times" (1948–1951))
- Inside Magoo – animated short – voice of Doctor (1960)
- Alias Smith and Jones – director – episodes – "The Men That Corrupted Hadleyburg" and "The Day the Amnesty Came Through" (1972)
