= A Long and Lasting Love =

Single by Crystal Gayle

from the album Nobody Wants to Be Alone
- B-side: "Someone Like You"
- Released: June 1985
- Genre: Country
- Length: 3:24
- Label: Warner Bros. Nashville
- Songwriters: Gerry Goffin; Michael Masser
- Producer: Michael Masser

Crystal Gayle singles chronology
"Nobody Wants to Be Alone" (1985)	"A Long and Lasting Love" (1985)	"Makin' Up for Lost Time (The Dallas Lovers Song)" (1986)

"A Long and Lasting Love" is a song written by Gerry Goffin and Michael Masser, and first recorded by Jane Olivor for her fourth studio album, The Best Side of Goodbye (1980). The following year, Billy Preston and Syreeta recorded it on their 1981 album, Billy Preston & Syreeta, with slight changes in the lyrics. The song is best known from the cover recorded by American country music artist Crystal Gayle. It was released in June 1985, as the second single from her twelfth studio album, Nobody Wants to Be Alone (1985). The song reached number 5 on the Billboard Hot Country Singles & Tracks chart.

== Chart performance ==
Chart (1985)	Peak position
US Hot Country Songs (Billboard)	5
Canadian RPM Country Tracks	5

== Other cover versions ==
- Glenn Medeiros covered this song with some changes in lyrics and entitled, "Long and Lasting Love (Once in a Lifetime)".
- Cantopop artist Vivian Chow also covered this song in her native Cantonese, retaining the "A Long and Lasting Love" line in English.
