= John O'Banion =

American singer (1947–2007)

John O'Banion (February 16, 1947 – February 14, 2007) was an American vocalist and actor.

== Early career ==
O'Banion was born in Kokomo, Indiana in 1947 and was performing in theater by the age of 13 as well as in a local Indiana band Hog Honda & the Chain Guards. By age 15, he hosted his own radio show on WIOU and had hosted his own local television show by age 20.

== Recording and acting career ==
O'Banion was the lead singer in Doc Severinsen's band, Today's Children. He was managed by Bud Robinson, also Severinsen's manager. They parted ways in early 1974. O'Banion said that Johnny Carson was a big fan and supporter of his career. O'Banion made five appearances on Carson's Tonight Show, and as many on Merv Griffin's and Mike Douglas' shows. He also appeared on American Bandstand, Solid Gold, and was the winning singer of the pilot of Star Search.

His song "Love You Like I Never Loved Before" was a hit single in 1981, making it to No. 24 on the US Billboard Hot 100 chart, No. 32 in Canada and No. 51 in Australia. O'Banion won the prestigious Tokyo Music Festival Award in 1982, with "I Don't Want to Lose Your Love", later sung by Crystal Gayle on her 1983 album Cage the Songbird and achieving the No. 2 spot on Billboard's country chart. O'Banion also sang two songs for the Japanese period film Legend of the Eight Samurai; "I Don't Want This Night to End" and "White Light".

He also appeared in the films Borderline with Charles Bronson, TV film Courage with Sophia Loren and Billy Dee Williams and starred in the 1990 independent film The Judas Project. In 1995, he released an album of jazz cover versions of contemporary hits such as "I'm Not in Love", "What You Won't Do for Love" and the title track "Hearts".

== Death ==
In the early 2000s, while touring in New Orleans, O'Banion was reportedly struck by a car or suffered a serious fall, resulting in significant blunt force trauma to the head. The accident caused long-term neurological complications, and O'Banion was subsequently diagnosed with frontotemporal dementia, a progressive brain disease that affects personality, behavior, and language. The trauma he sustained in New Orleans is believed to have triggered or accelerated the disease.

O'Banion battled the effects of frontotemporal dementia for several years before dying at his home in Los Angeles on February 14, 2007, just two days before his 60th birthday. He was surrounded by friends and family at the time of his death.

== Discography ==
=== Studio albums ===
Title	Album details	Chart
Title	Album details	US
John O'Banion	Released: 1981; Label: Elektra	164
Danger	Released: 1982; Label: Elektra	—
里見八犬伝 Satomi Hakken-Den (Legend of the Eight Samurai)	Released: 1983; Label: Elektra	—
White Light	Released: 1985; Label: Bellaphon	—
Hearts	Released: 1995; Label: Sweet Basil/Apollon	—
"-" denotes a recording that did not chart or was not released in that territory.

== See also ==
- Joey Carbone
