= Nobody Wants to Be Alone =

Studio album by Crystal Gayle
- Released: April 1985
- Recorded: 1984–1985
- Studios: Sound Stage Studios, GroundStar Studios and Emerald Sound Studios (Nashville, Tennessee); Evergreen Studios (Burbank, California); Devonshire Studios (North Hollywood, California); A&M Studios (Hollywood, California); Studio 55 (Los Angeles, California)
- Genre: Country
- Length: 34:32
- Label: Warner Bros. Nashville
- Producers: Jimmy Bowen; Michael Masser

Crystal Gayle chronology
Cage the Songbird (1983)	Nobody Wants to Be Alone (1985)	Straight to the Heart (1986)

Singles from Nobody Wants to Be Alone
- 1. "Nobody Wants to Be Alone" Released: March 23, 1985; 2. "A Long and Lasting Love" Released: June 1985

Nobody Wants to Be Alone is the twelfth studio album by American country music singer Crystal Gayle. Released in April 1985, it peaked at #17 on the Billboard Country albums chart.

In a front page New York Times article titled, "Country Music in Decline," this album was noted as one of many that were indicative of a trend, marking "the end of an era" for the genre: despite two top 5 hits, "Crystal Gayle's latest album sold fewer than 80,000 copies" six months after its release.

Two singles from the album also made the Country singles charts; the title track reached #3 in early 1985, and "A Long and Lasting Love" reached #5 later that year. Though the song wasn't released as a single to Country radio, a video was produced for "Touch and Go."

Professional ratings
Review scores
Source	Rating
Allmusic	link

== Track listing ==
No.	Title	Writer(s)	Length
1.	"A Long and Lasting Love"	Michael Masser, Gerry Goffin	3:26
2.	"Tonight, Tonight"	Tony Brown, Roger Cook, Ralph Murphy	3:27
3.	"Nobody Wants to Be Alone"	Masser, Kye Fleming	3:48
4.	"Love Does That to Fools"	Paul Williams, Stephen Allen Davis	3:18
5.	"Coming to the Dance"	Allen Reynolds, Charles Cochran	2:46
6.	"You Were There for Me"	Masser, Cynthia Weil	3:27
7.	"Touch and Go"	Brock Walsh, Curtis Stone	3:24
8.	"Someone Like You"	Paul Curtis, Tony Hiller	4:00
9.	"A New Way to Say I Love You"	Masser, Goffin	3:44
10.	"God Bless the Child"	Arthur Herzog Jr., Billie Holiday	3:12

== Personnel ==
- Crystal Gayle – lead vocals, harmony vocals (2)
- Randy Kerber – acoustic piano (1), electric piano (1), Yamaha DX7 (1)
- John Barlow Jarvis – keyboards (2, 4, 5, 7, 8)
- Robbie Buchanan – electric piano (3, 6, 9), Yamaha DX7 (3, 6, 9), synthesizer string arrangements (9)
- Alan Steinberger – keyboards (4, 7, 8)
- John Hobbs – acoustic piano (6, 9)
- Charles Cochran – acoustic piano (10)
- Dann Huff – electric guitar (1, 3, 6, 9)
- Dean Parks – electric guitar (1, 3, 6, 9), acoustic guitar (1, 3, 6, 9)
- Chris Leuzinger – guitars (2, 7, 8)
- Billy Joe Walker Jr. – guitars (2, 4, 5, 7, 8)
- Reggie Young – guitars (2, 4, 5, 7, 8)
- Billy Sanford – guitars (10)
- Neil Stubenhaus – bass guitar (1, 3, 6, 9)
- David Hungate – bass guitar (2, 4, 5, 7, 8)
- Joe Allen – acoustic bass (10)
- John Robinson – drums (1, 3, 6, 9)
- Matt Betton – drums (2, 4, 5, 7, 8)
- Kenny Malone – drums (10)
- Tom Roady – percussion (5)
- Jay Patten – saxophone (4, 7)
- Jim Horn – recorder (5), flute (8)
- Warren Luening – trumpet (10)
- Lee Holdridge – string arrangements (1)
- Michael Masser – rhythm arrangements (1, 3, 6, 9)
- Gene Page – rhythm arrangements (1, 3, 6, 9), string arrangements (3, 6, 9)
- Larry Muhoberac – string arrangements (2, 4, 5, 7, 8, 10), string conductor (2, 4, 8, 10)
- The Sid Sharp Strings – strings (2, 4, 8, 10)
- Beth Anderson – harmony vocals (1)
- Andrea Robinson – harmony vocals (1, 3, 6, 9)
- Roger Cook – harmony vocals (2)
- Ralph Murphy – harmony vocals (2)
- Cindy Richardson – harmony vocals (2, 5, 7, 8)
- Darlene Koldenhoven – harmony vocals (3, 6)
- Angie Jareé – harmony vocals (3, 6)
- Allen Reynolds – harmony vocals (5)
- Laura Creamer – harmony vocals (9)
- Sue Sheridan – harmony vocals (9)

=== Production ===
- Crystal Gayle – album direction
- Michael Masser – producer (1, 3, 6, 9)
- Jimmy Bowen – producer (2, 4, 5, 7, 8, 10), recording (2, 4, 5, 7, 8, 10), mix engineer (2, 4, 5, 7, 8, 10)
- Dean Burt – engineer (1, 3, 6, 9)
- Michael Mancini – engineer (1, 3, 6, 9)
- Russell Schmidt – engineer (1, 3, 6, 9)
- Dick Bogert – string recording (1, 3, 6, 9)
- Bill Schnee – mixing (1, 3, 6, 9)
- Ron Treat – recording (2, 4, 5, 7, 8, 10)
- Dave Hassinger – recording (10)
- John Guess – string recording (2, 4, 5, 7, 8, 10)
- Gary Luchs – second string engineer (2, 4, 5, 7, 8, 10)
- Steve Tillisch – mix engineer (2, 4, 5, 7, 8, 10)
- Doug Sax – mastering at The Mastering Lab (Hollywood, California)
- Laura LiPuma – art direction, design
- Harry Langdon – photography

== Charts ==
=== Weekly charts ===
Chart (1985)	Peak position
US Top Country Albums (Billboard)	17

=== Year-end charts ===
Chart (1985)	Position
US Top Country Albums (Billboard)	35
