= Come Softly to Me =

Single by The Fleetwoods

from the album Mr. Blue
- B-side: "I Care So Much"
- Released: February 16, 1959 (Dolphin); April, 1959 (Liberty)
- Recorded: Fall 1958
- Genre: Pop
- Length: 2:25
- Label: Dolphin Records, Liberty Records
- Songwriters: Gretchen Christopher, Barbara Ellis and Gary Troxel
- Producer: Bob Reisdorff

The Fleetwoods singles chronology
"Come Softly to Me" (1959)	"Graduation's Here" (1959)

"Come Softly to Me" is a popular song recorded by The Fleetwoods, composed of Gretchen Christopher, Barbara Ellis, and Gary Troxel, who also wrote it. The original title was "Come Softly", but was changed en route to its becoming a hit. Bob Reisdorf, the owner of Dolphin Records, which in 1960 changed to Dolton Records, was responsible for the title change. He thought that "Come Softly" might be too obvious and considered risqué, so he had it changed to "Come Softly to Me." The title phrase never appears in the song's lyrics.

Recording the song at home, the group sang it a cappella with the rhythmic shaking of Troxel's car keys. The tape was then sent to Los Angeles where the sparse instrumental accompaniment was added, including an acoustic guitar played by Bonnie Guitar, herself a successful singer-songwriter ("Dark Moon") and Reisdorf's in-house record producer. Released in 1959, the single reached #1 on the U.S. Billboard Hot 100 in April.

== Charts ==
=== Weekly charts ===
Chart (1959)	Peak position
Italy	17
Canada	1
UK	6
US Billboard Hot 100	1
US Billboard Hot R&B Sides	5

=== All-time charts ===
Chart (1958–2018)	Position
US Billboard Hot 100	455

== Cover versions ==
The song has been covered by other artists, including Sandy Salisbury, Marcel Amont "Tout doux, tout doucement" (1958), Henri Salvador (1959), Paul & Paula (1963), Four Jacks and a Jill (1965), The Serendipity Singers on United Artists in 1968, and Bob Welch (with Christine McVie on backing vocals).

- Frankie Vaughan with The Kaye Sisters had a hit in the United Kingdom with the song, reaching No. 9 in the UK in 1959;
- The New Seekers also recorded the song, and their version reached No. 95 on the Billboard Hot 100, No. 60 in Canada, and No.20 on the UK charts in 1972-73.
- Jane Olivor recorded the song on her 1976 album First Night, releasing it as a single backed by Some Enchanted Evening.
- Brenton Wood titled his 1977 album, Come Softly, after the song.
- Mercy released a version of the song on their 1969 album, Love Can Make You Happy;
- Lesley Gore recorded a duet version of the song with Oliver in 1970, on Crewe Records.
- A cover version performed by The Roches, from their 1985 album Another World, is repeated several times on the soundtrack of the 1988 film Crossing Delancey.
- Buck Dharma of Blue Öyster Cult covered the song on his 1982 solo album, Flat Out.

== Popular culture ==
- The song was featured in the film Stand by Me, although did not feature on the official soundtrack.
- This song is used in the opening scene of the movie Dead Silence's trailer.
- It is included in the closing credits of the BBC2 sitcom Roger and Val Have Just Got In.
- The song was also featured in the soundtrack of Mafia II.
- The French rendition of the song, ‘’Tout Doux Tout Doucement’’, is featured in Ted Lasso, Season 3 Episode 8, playing over the closing credits.
- The song was also featured in the film The Bikeriders.
- The song was featured in the 2024 film Bonjour Tristesse.
- The song was featured in the opening sequence of the 1988 Amy Irving film Crossing Delancey.

== Samples ==
Eliza Doolittle sampled it for the song "Missing" on her debut album.

== See also ==
- List of Billboard Hot 100 number ones of 1959
