= Flat Out (Buck Dharma album) =

Studio album by Buck Dharma
- Released: June 15, 1982
- Recorded: 1981
- Studio: Boogie Hotel, Port Jefferson, New York; Kingdom Sound, Long Island, New York; North Lake, North White Plains, New York; Power Station and Warehouse, New York City, New York; The Automatt, San Francisco, California
- Genre: Rock, Hard rock
- Length: 38:21
- Label: Portrait
- Producer: Donald Roeser

Professional ratings
Review scores
| Source | Rating |
|---|---|
| Allmusic | 2/5 stars |

Flat Out is the first and only solo album by Donald "Buck Dharma" Roeser, lead guitarist and vocalist for hard rock band Blue Öyster Cult, released in 1982 (see 1982 in music).

Although Roeser penned and sang many of BÖC's biggest hits ("(Don't Fear) The Reaper", "Godzilla", "Burnin' for You"), the band operated as a democracy and some of Roeser's song were rejected by his bandmates for being too pop-oriented. He released many of these songs on this solo record. "Born to Rock" was the first single (and was played live by Blue Oyster Cult in 1983, 1984 and 2004), and "Your Loving Heart" was also released as a single, but neither charted well.

The track "Come Softly to Me" begins with a 35-second backwards recording. When played in reverse, it is a conversation that mentions a bongo record that sounds like Channel 11 music used to be. The conversation, which takes place during a game of ping-pong, ends with, "I could kick your ass but I know this is just for a sound check." The BÖC Fan Club lyric book titles this track "Gnop Gnip" (ping pong spelled backwards), after the album credit thanking "Chris Cassone for Gnop Gnip".

The vehicle pictured on the album cover is a 1955 Oldsmobile 98 Starfire convertible.

== Track listing ==
All tracks composed by Donald Roeser; except where indicated

1. "Born to Rock" (Neal Smith, Roeser) – 3:24
2. "That Summer Night" – 3:44
3. "Cold Wind" – 4:38
4. "Your Loving Heart" (Roeser, Sandy Roeser) – 7:12
5. "Five Thirty-Five" – 5:09
6. "Wind Weather and Storm" (Richard Meltzer, Roeser) – 2:35
7. "All Tied Up" – 4:16
8. "Anwar's Theme" – 4:47
9. "Come Softly to Me" (Gretchen Christopher, Barbara Ellis, Gary Troxel) – 2:32

Additional track on the CD version (originally released on Guitar’s Practicing Musicians Volume 3, 1989):

10. "Gamera Is Missing" (not included on Rock Candy Records reissue)

== Personnel ==
=== Musicians ===
- Donald "Buck Dharma" Roeser – vocals, lead guitar, drums on "Wind Weather and Storm", synthesizer on "All Tied Up", producer, engineer
- Sandy Roeser – vocal on "Come Softly to Me", backing vocals on "That Summer Night"
- Rick Downey – drums on "Your Loving Heart", "Five Thirty-Five", "Anwar's Theme"
- Neal Smith – drums on "Born to Rock", "That Summer Night"
- Dennis Dunaway – bass on "Born to Rock"
- Giis de Lang – additional rhythm guitar on "Born to Rock"
- Richard Crooks – drums on "Cold Wind"
- Will Lee – bass on "Cold Wind", "All Tied Up"
- Billy Alessi – synthesizer on "Cold Wind" and "All Tied Up"
- Craig MacGregor – bass on "Your Loving Heart", "Five Thirty-Five", "Anwar's Theme"
- Spyke Grubb – backing vocal on "Five Thirty-Five"
- Teruo Nakamura – bass on "Wind Weather and Storm"
- Richie Cannata – saxophone, clarinet, and horn arrangement on "Wind Weather and Storm"
- Steve Jordan – drums on "All Tied Up"
- Sue Evans – percussion on "Anwar's Theme", "Come Softly to Me"
- Ron Riddle – drums on "Gamera Is Missing"

=== Hospital Staff on Your Loving Heart ===
- Sandy Roeser, Jan Allen, Terry Bretone, Richard Bifulco

=== Production ===
- Ken Kessie – engineer
- Clay Hutchinson – 2nd engineer on tracks 3, 7, 9
- Jeff Kawalek – 2nd engineer on track 5, re-mixing on track 5
- Tony Bongiovi – re-mixing on tracks 2, 3
- Chris Isca, Paul Mandl, Barry Bongiovi, Wayne Lewis, Jimmy Sparling – assistant engineers
- Bob Ludwig – mastering
