= The Sound of Goodbye (Crystal Gayle song) =

Single by Crystal Gayle

from the album Cage the Songbird
- B-side: "Take Me Home"
- Released: October 1983
- Genre: Country
- Length: 3:12
- Label: Warner Bros. Nashville
- Songwriter(s): Hugh Prestwood
- Producer(s): Jimmy Bowen

Crystal Gayle singles chronology
"Baby, What About You" (1983)	"The Sound of Goodbye" (1983)	"I Don't Wanna Lose Your Love" (1984)

"The Sound of Goodbye" is a song written by Hugh Prestwood, and recorded by American country music artist Crystal Gayle. It was released in October 1983 as the first single from her album Cage the Songbird. The song was Gayle's thirteenth number one country single as a solo artist. The single went to number one for one week and spent a total of fourteen weeks on the country chart.

== Charts ==
=== Weekly charts ===
Chart (1983–1984)	Peak position
US Hot Country Songs (Billboard)	1
US Billboard Hot 100	84
US Adult Contemporary (Billboard)	10
Canadian RPM Country Tracks	9

=== Year-end charts ===
Chart (1984)	Position
US Hot Country Songs (Billboard)	31
