= Tom Drake =

American actor (1918–1982)

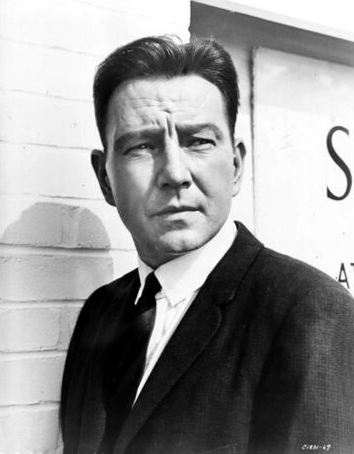
- Drake in The Sandpiper (1965)
- Born: Alfred Sinclair Alderdice; August 5, 1918; Brooklyn, New York, U.S.
- Died: August 11, 1982 (aged 64); Torrance, California, U.S.
- Resting place: Holy Cross Cemetery, Culver City, California
- Other name: Richard Alden
- Occupation: Actor
- Years active: 1938–1978

Tom Drake (born Alfred Sinclair Alderdice; August 5, 1918 – August 11, 1982) was an American actor. Drake made films starting in 1940 and continuing until the mid-1970s, and also made TV acting appearances.

== Early life and career ==
Drake was born in Brooklyn, New York, and attended Iona Preparatory School and graduated from Mercersburg Academy.

He was excused from serving in World War II due to heart problems. Despite this limitation, he did act in British training films.

Billed as Alfred Alderdice, Drake appeared on Broadway in Run Sheep Run (1938) and Clean Beds (1939).

After appearing in the film The Howards of Virginia (billed as Richard Alden), he got his break after starring in the 1942 Broadway smash Janie, after which he was signed to a contract with Metro-Goldwyn-Mayer.

== MGM ==
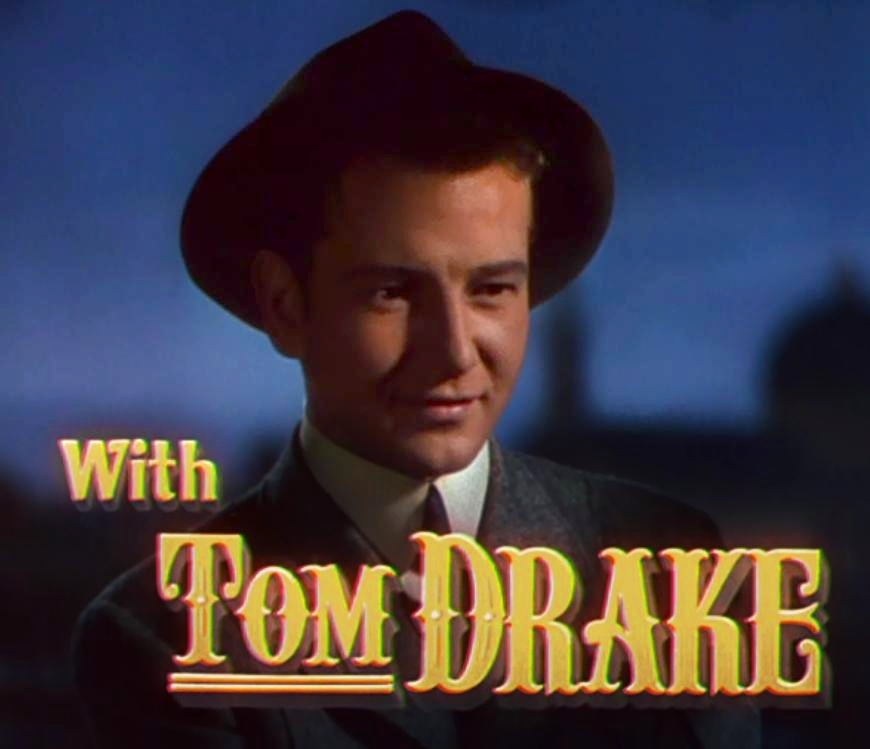
Drake in Meet Me in St. Louis

MGM started Drake in a supporting role in Two Girls and a Sailor (1944). He was third billed in a "B", Maisie Goes to Reno (1944) then had small roles in some "A" pictures, Marriage Is a Private Affair (1944) and Mrs. Parkington (1944).

He was more prominently featured in his role as Judy Garland's leading man in 1944's Meet Me in St. Louis. He played John Truitt, the "boy next door".

MGM promoted him to leading roles with This Man's Navy (1944) co starring Wallace Beery.

MGM gave Drake the star role in The Green Years (1946), which was a huge hit. It was followed by Courage of Lassie (1946), another big hit, and Faithful in My Fashion (1946), which lost money.

Universal borrowed him to play Deanna Durbin's leading man in I'll Be Yours (1947).

Back at MGM Drake was a support in The Beginning or the End (1947) and Cass Timberlane (1947), and teamed with Beery again in Alias a Gentleman (1948). He did another Lassie film, Hills of Home (1948) and played composer Richard Rodgers in the loosely-based biography Words and Music (1948). Cass Timberlane was popular but the other films all lost money.

Drake was borrowed by Fox to play the romantic lead in Mr. Belvedere Goes to College (1949) then at MGM was in Scene of the Crime (1949) with Van Johnson. He made The Great Rupert (1950) for George Pal.

== Later career ==
Drake began appearing on episodes of TV shows such as The Ford Theatre Hour, Suspense, Lights Out, Tales of Tomorrow, and The Unexpected.

He went to Columbia for Never Trust a Gambler (1951) and to Allied Artists for Disc Jockey (1951). He appeared in F.B.I. Girl (1951), and Sangaree (1953).

After television jobs for actors transitioned from live telecasts from New York to shows that were filmed in California, Drake had roles in the CBS series Lassie, NBC's Cimarron City, ABC's 77 Sunset Strip, ABC's The Rebel, CBS’ Perry Mason, ABC's Combat!, ABC's Land of the Giants, NBC's Adam-12, ABC's The Streets of San Francisco and NBC's Banacek. In 1959 he appeared on Wagon Train S3 E14 "The Lita Foladaire Story" as Dr. John Cannon.

He continued to appear in features, starring in The Cyclops (1957), Date with Disaster (1957) (a rare lead), and Raintree County (1957). He played the leader of a gang of criminals in Warlock (1959) and was in Money, Women and Guns (1958). He also had a minor role in the film The Singing Nun (1966), playing Ed Sullivan's producer Mr. Fitzpatrick.

His last acting credit was in 1975.

== Death ==
Drake died of lung cancer at age 64 at Torrance Memorial Hospital in Torrance, California on August 11, 1982. His body is interred at Holy Cross Cemetery in Culver City, California.

== Filmography ==
Features:

- Our Town (1940) - Best Man at Wedding (uncredited) (film debut)
- The Mortal Storm (1940) - Student in Second Classroom Scene (uncredited)
- The Howards of Virginia (1940) - James Howard at 16
- Northern Pursuit (1943) - Heinzmann (uncredited)
- Two Girls and a Sailor (1944) - Frank Miller
- The White Cliffs of Dover (1944) - Dying American Soldier (uncredited)
- Maisie Goes to Reno (1944) - Sgt. William (Bill) Fullerton
- Marriage Is a Private Affair (1944) - Bill Rice
- Mrs. Parkington (1944) - Ned Talbot
- Meet Me in St. Louis (1944) - John Truitt
- This Man's Navy (1945) - Jess Weaver
- Main Street After Dark (1945) - Radio Broadcaster (voice, uncredited)
- The Green Years (1946) - Robert Shannon as a Young Man
- Courage of Lassie (1946) - Sergeant Smitty
- Faithful in My Fashion (1946) - Jeff Compton
- I'll Be Yours (1947) - George Prescott
- The Beginning or the End (1947) - Matt Cochran
- Cass Timberlane (1947) - Jamie Wargate
- Alias a Gentleman (1948) - Johnny Lorgen
- Hills of Home (1948) - Tammas Milton
- Words and Music (1948) - Richard 'Dick' Rodgers
- Mr. Belvedere Goes to College (1949) - Bill Chase
- Scene of the Crime (1949) - Detective 'C.C.' Gordon
- The Great Rupert (1950) - Peter 'Pete' Dingle
- Never Trust a Gambler (1951) - Police Sgt. Ed Donovan
- Disc Jockey (1951) - Johnny
- FBI Girl (1951) - Carl Chercourt
- Sangaree (1953) - Dr. Roy Darby
- Betrayed Women (1955) - Jeff Darrell
- Sudden Danger (1955) - Wallace Curtis
- The Cyclops (1957) - Lee Brand
- Date with Disaster (1957) - Miles Harrington
- Raintree County (1957) - Bobby Drake
- Money, Women and Guns (1958) - Jess Ryerson
- Warlock (1959) - Abe McQuown
- The Bramble Bush (1960) - Larry McFie
- The Sandpiper (1965) - Walter Robinson
- House of the Black Death (1965) - Paul Desard
- Johnny Reno (1966) - Joe Conners
- The Singing Nun (1966) - Fitzpatrick
- Red Tomahawk (1967) - Bill Kane
- Deadly Inheritance (1968) - Phil Sutton
- Warkill (1968) - Inspector Gerard Greville
- Cycle Psycho (1973) - Dick Ridelander
- The Spectre of Edgar Allan Poe (1974) - Dr. Adam Forrest (final film)

== Selected Television Appearances ==
- The Alfred Hitchcock Hour (1965) (Season 3 Episode 29: "Off Season") as Sheriff Dade
