= Faithful in My Fashion =

1946 film by Sidney Salkow

- Directed by: Sidney Salkow
- Written by: Lionel Houser
- Produced by: Lionel Houser
- Starring: Donna Reed; Tom Drake; Edward Everett Horton; Spring Byington; Harry Davenport
- Cinematography: Charles Salerno, Jr.
- Edited by: Irvine Warburton
- Music by: Nathaniel Shilkret
- Production company: Metro-Goldwyn-Mayer
- Distributed by: Loew's Inc.
- Release date: August 22, 1946
- Running time: 82 minutes
- Country: United States
- Language: English
- Budget: $680,000
- Box office: $626,000

Faithful in My Fashion is a 1946 American romantic comedy film directed by Sidney Salkow and starring Donna Reed, Tom Drake and Edward Everett Horton. It was produced by Metro-Goldwyn-Mayer.

== Plot ==
Jeff (Tom Drake) arrives home to New York City after being away in the Army—and in a POW camp—for several years. When Jeff shipped out, he received an enthusiastic kiss from Jean. Leaping to conclusions, he sent her an engagement ring and for various reasons—which she babbles to her boss—she could never disabuse him. Jeff is unaware that Jean has been promoted far above him and is now a buyer at the department store where they work. He is also unaware that his supposed fiancée is dating Walter Medcraft, also a store employee. Jeff assumes she still intends to marry him. In order to save him from heartache, Jean's boss and several employees at the store set up a ruse to keep Jeff unaware of Jean's new man for the two weeks until he is deployed again. Jean cooperates with the ruse by pretending to work in the stockroom, but it is not long before things going awry, starting with Jeff's desire to get married immediately and the need to persuade the current occupant of her old apartment to move out temporarily.

== Cast ==
- Donna Reed as Jean "Chunky" Kendrick
- Tom Drake as Jeff Compton
- Edward Everett Horton as Hiram Dilworthy
- Spring Byington as Miss Mary Swanson
- Harry Davenport as Great Grandpa
- Sig Ruman as Professor Boris Riminoffsky
- Margaret Hamilton as Miss Applegate
- Warner Anderson as Walter Medcraft
- Hobart Cavanaugh as Mr. Wilson
- Connie Gilchrist as Mrs. Murphy
- Fred Essler as Nikolai
- Wilson Wood as Henry Stute
- William 'Bill' Phillips as 1st Barfly
- Jack Overman as 2nd Barfly
- Phyllis Kennedy as Miss Dale, Walter's Secretary
- Barbara Billingsley as Mary
- Lillian Yarbo as Celia

== Reception ==
According to MGM records the movie was not a hit, earning $486,000 in the US and Canada and $140,000 elsewhere, making a loss to the studio of $307,000.
