= This Man's Navy =

1945 film by William A. Wellman

- Original Theatrical Poster
- Directed by: William A. Wellman
- Written by: Borden Chase (story and screenplay); Hugh Allen (uncredited); Allen Rivkin (uncredited); John Twist(uncredited)
- Based on: Story idea by Commander Herman E. Halland U.S. Navy (Ret.)
- Produced by: Samuel Marx
- Starring: Wallace Beery; Tom Drake; James Gleason; Jan Clayton; Selena Royle; Noah Beery Sr.
- Cinematography: Sidney Wagner
- Edited by: Irvine Warburton
- Music by: Nathaniel Shilkret
- Production company: Metro-Goldwyn-Mayer
- Distributed by: Loew's Inc.
- Release date: January 4, 1945
- Running time: 100 minutes
- Country: United States
- Language: English

This Man's Navy (aka Airship Squadron No. 4. and Lighter Than Air) is a 1945 World War II film about U.S. Navy blimps directed by William A. Wellman and starring Wallace Beery, Tom Drake, Jan Clayton and James Gleason.

The supporting cast features Selena Royle and Beery's brother Noah Beery Sr., and presents a rare opportunity to see both Beery brothers work together in their later years. The picture is also one of the very few films, other than training films, to depict U.S. Navy airship operations.

== Plot ==
During World War II, Chief Aviation Pilot Ned Trumpet (Wallace Beery) is the commander of a U.S. Navy K class blimp at the Lakehurst Naval Air Station in Lakehurst, New Jersey. The Navy uses these blimps to patrol the Atlantic Coastline of the United States for German U-boats.

Trumpet is called"Old Gas Bag" due to his reputation for exaggeration. He has no sons, but he brags about fictional son to a skeptical friend and fellow sailor, Jimmy Shannon (James Gleason). Trumpet eventually realizes that he will need to find someone to impersonate his "son" to Shannon.

By chance, Trumpet meets Jess Weaver (Tom Drake), a young man whose legs were severely injured while riding a horse. Trumpet pays for an operation to fix Weaver's legs. In return, Weaver agrees to pose as Trumpet's son. He enlists in the Navy and is commissioned as an ensign. Weaver then joins Trumpet's crew on the blimp.

While piloting his blimp on patrol, the crew spots a U-boat. Their commander at Lakehurst orders them by radio not to attack it. Trumpet ignores the order and tellw Weaver to bomb the U-boat. However, the bomb misses and the submarine fires back with its deck gun, hitting the blimp. Trumpet then aims the second bomb himself, finally sinking the U-boat.

Back at Lakehurst, Weaver is facing a court-martial for disobeying orders. However, Trumpet assumes the blame for the offense. As punishment, Trumpet is restricted from flying for six months. In contrast, the Navy awards Weaver the Distinguished Flying Cross for sinking the U-boat. He in turn gives the award to Trumpet.

The Navy then reassigns Weaver to NAS Pensacola in Pensacola, Florida, for pilot training. After completing his training, he was assigned to ferrying aircraft to combat zones. After three months of punishment, the Navy sends Trumpet to Chittagong in British India to establish a naval air station for blimps to fight the Japanese.

While on a ferry assignment over Japanese-occupied Burma, Weaver's aircraft crashes. Hearing of the incident, Trumpet launches his blimp to save him. Battling Japanese ground forces, Trumpet and his crew manage to retrieve three survivors from the plane wreckage. As they lift off, the blimp is attacked by three Japanese fighter planes.

Hit by machine gun fire and losing helium, the crew jettison equipment from the blimp to maintain altitude. Trumpet, Shannon and the plane survivors are ultimately forced to parachute out of the falling blimp

Allied P-38 Lightning fighters fly to their rescue. Afterward, Trumpet and Shannon return to Chittagong in triumph. Weaver indicates that he return to Lakehurst to serve on blimps with Trumpet, his imaginary "father."

== Cast ==
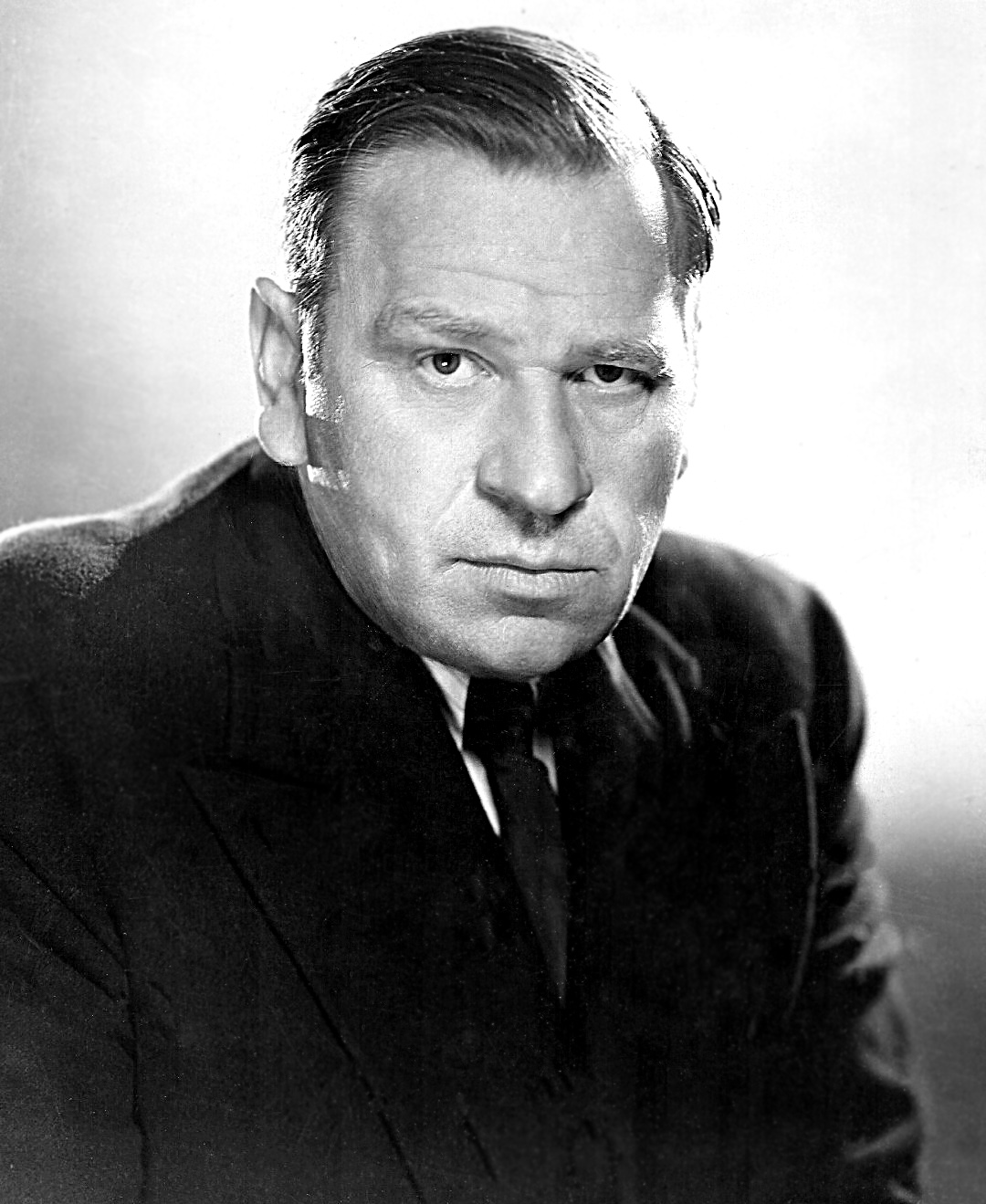
Wallace Beery as Ned Trumpet

- Wallace Beery as Ned Trumpet
- Tom Drake as Jess Weaver
- James Gleason as Jimmy Shannon
- Jan Clayton as Cathey Cortland
- Selena Royle as Maude Weaver
- Noah Beery, Sr. as Joe Hodum
- Henry O'Neill as Roger Graystone
- Steve Brodie as Tim Shannon
- George Chandler as Bert Bland
- Donald Curtis as Operations Officer
- Arthur Walsh as Cadet Rayshek
- Will Fowler as David
- Richard Crockett as "Sparks"
- Blake Edwards (uncredited)

== Production ==
K-class blimp

This Man's Navy was an example of Hollywood's efforts during World War II to spotlight every branch of the U.S. military. Wallace Beery, commissioned a lieutenant commander in the US Navy Reserve in the 1930s, was instrumental in convincing Metro-Goldwyn-Mayer to produce the film as a tribute to the US Navy's lighter-than-air (LTA) operations. MGM received full cooperation from the Navy, including access to multiple naval airship facilities, aircraft, submarines, and technical advisors.

The majority of scenes set at a U.S. naval LTA base were filmed at the Naval Lighter-Than-Air Station in Santa Ana, California, whose enormous wooden blimp hangars were among the largest free-standing structures used in Hollywood production at the time. Santa Ana provided the backdrop for both daytime operations and complex nighttime interior scenes requiring extensive lighting and rigging.

To depict the overseas segment of the story, the former Naval Auxiliary Air Facility Del Mar in San Diego County was repurposed to stand in for the Chittagong base. The relatively undeveloped Del Mar site allowed the production team to construct temporary structures, dress the surroundings with Southeast Asian set dressing, and stage action scenes representing the rescue mission in Burma.

Additional aerial and stock footage of K-class airships in flight was captured at Naval Air Station Moffett Field in Northern California. A few scenes were also filmed at the Lakehurst Naval Air Station. Technical advisors from the U.S. Navy—including Lt. Comdr. Clyde E. Schetter, Lt. Fred M. Lloyd, and blimp manufacturer representative Hugh Allen—all contributed to the production. A U.S. Navy submarine and its crew assisted in staging the submarine attack scenes depicted in the film. (Note: Onscreen credits for This Man's Navy include the following written acknowledgment: "This Man's Navy was made possible with the help, guidance and cooperation of Men of Lighter-Than-Air, U.S. Naval and Marine Corps. Aviation, U.S. Army Air Force, U.S. Navy Submarine Service, and Technical Supervision of Mr. Hugh Allen, Lt. Comdr. Clyde E. Schetter, U.S.N.R., Lieut. Fred M. Lloyd, U.S.N.R.")

== Reception ==
One of the typical Beery potboilers from MGM in the 1940s, This Man's Navy received a typical reaction from critics and public alike. The New York Times dismissed the film as pleasant fare but,

"...while nominally a topical adventure, the film is largely devoted to Mr. Beery disporting himself as of yore. As a rough-hewn, golden-hearted chief petty officer in the Navy's blimp service, he is scarcely different from Beery the erstwhile marine, gob, etc."

Aviation film historian Michael Paris in From the Wright Brothers to Top Gun: Aviation, Nationalism, and Popular Cinema (1995) noted that This Man's Navy hearkened back to an earlier era. Paris wrote, the film,

"is something of a throwback to the melodramatic style of the pre-war years and is strangely at odds with the realistic and sombre mood of Wing and a Prayer."
