= I Don't Wanna Lose Your Love =

Single by Crystal Gayle

from the album Cage the Songbird
- B-side: "Victim or a Fool
- Released: February 25, 1984
- Genre: Country
- Length: 3:15
- Label: Warner Bros. Nashville
- Songwriter: Joey Carbone
- Producer: Jimmy Bowen

Crystal Gayle singles chronology
"The Sound of Goodbye" (1984)	"I Don't Wanna Lose Your Love" (1984)	"Turning Away" (1984)

"I Don't Wanna Lose Your Love" is a song written by Joey Carbone and recorded by the American country music artist Crystal Gayle. It was released in February 1984 as the second single from the album Cage the Songbird. The song reached number 2 on the Billboard Hot Country Singles & Tracks chart.

Mickey Gilley released a version on his album "You Really Got A Hold on Me" in 1984.

The song was originally sung by John O'Banion in 1982, titled "I Don't Want to Lose Your Love". He won the grand prize for the song at the 1982 Tokyo Music Festival.

== Charts ==
=== Weekly charts ===
Chart (1984)	Peak position
US Hot Country Songs (Billboard)	2
US Adult Contemporary (Billboard)	15
Canadian RPM Country Tracks	1

=== Year-end charts ===
Chart (1984)	Position
US Hot Country Songs (Billboard)	28
