= Alias a Gentleman =

1948 film by Harry Beaumont

- Directed by: Harry Beaumont
- Screenplay by: William R. Lipman; Peter Ruric
- Produced by: Nat Perrin
- Starring: Wallace Beery; Tom Drake; Dorothy Patrick
- Cinematography: Ray June
- Edited by: Ben Lewis
- Music by: David Snell
- Production company: Metro-Goldwyn-Mayer
- Distributed by: Loew's Inc.
- Release date: February 3, 1948
- Running time: 76 minutes
- Country: United States
- Language: English
- Budget: $1,171,000
- Box office: $1,366,000

Alias a Gentleman is a 1948 American romantic comedy film directed by Harry Beaumont and starring Wallace Beery with a supporting cast that includes Dorothy Patrick, Tom Drake, Gladys George and Sheldon Leonard. It was produced by Hollywood studio Metro-Goldwyn-Mayer.

== Plot ==
Jim Breedin has been in prison for 15 years but his daughter Nora doesn't know it. He has had no contact with her since she was a child. On an honor farm where he is foreman, Jim meets new convict Johnny Lorgen, who mouths off until Jim sets him straight. They become friendly and talk about their futures.

About to get out, Jim is offered $250,000 for his Oklahoma farm by an oil company. Nora, who had been living on the farm, is not there, Jim unaware that she has died. He accepts the money and begins living a life of luxury. A mob boss, Matt Enley, tries to persuade Jim to come work for him, without success. A diabolical plot is hatched, Enley's attractive moll Elaine Carter pretending to be Jim's long-lost daughter.

Johnny's jail sentence is up. Jim wants him to go straight, but working for Enley appeals to Johnny more. He also develops a crush on Elaine, whose guilty conscience makes her confess the ruse she's been pulling. Enley comes after Jim, who prevails, then invites Elaine to become his adopted daughter.

== Cast ==
- Wallace Beery as Jim Breedin
- Tom Drake as Johnny Lorgen
- Dorothy Patrick as Elaine Carter
- Gladys George as Madge Parkson
- Leon Ames as Matt Enley
- Warner Anderson as Capt. Charlie Lopen
- John Qualen as No End
- Sheldon Leonard as Harry Bealer
- Trevor Bardette as Jig Johnson
- Jeff Corey as Zu
- Marc Krah as Spats Edwards
- William Forrest as Carruthers

== Reception ==
The film earned $1,013,000 in the US and Canada and $353,000 elsewhere resulting in a loss of $262,000.

== Bibliography ==
- Fetrow, Alan G. Feature Films, 1940-1949: a United States Filmography. McFarland, 1994.
