= Date with Disaster =

1957 British film by Charles Saunders

- Directed by: Charles Saunders
- Written by: Brock Williams
- Produced by: Guido Coen
- Starring: Tom Drake; William Hartnell; Shirley Eaton
- Cinematography: Brendan J. Stafford
- Edited by: Tom Simpson
- Music by: Reg Owen; Anthony Spurgin
- Production company: Fortress Film Productions
- Distributed by: Eros Films; Astor Picture (US)
- Release date: 18 July 1957
- Running time: 61 minutes
- Country: United Kingdom
- Language: English

Date with Disaster is a 1957 British second feature ('B') crime film directed by Charles Saunders and starring Tom Drake, William Hartnell and Shirley Eaton. It was written by Brock Williams. An innocent man becomes a suspect for a crime he did not commit.

== Plot ==
Miles is an honest car salesman, but his business partner Don and employee Ken are crooks. Don and Ken collude with professional criminal Tracey to break into a factory and steal £20,000 while Miles is away, using as their getaway vehicle a car they have "sold" to a fictitious buyer. Since Miles said he was away when the raid took place, the police suspect him as the perpetrator. When Don's behaviour becomes unpredictable, Ken kills him, takes his share of the loot, and kidnaps Miles's girlfriend Sue. Miles rescues Sue and clears his name.

== Cast ==
- Tom Drake as Miles
- William Hartnell as Tracey
- Shirley Eaton as Sue
- Maurice Kaufmann as Don
- Michael Golden as Inspector Matthews
- Richard Shaw as Ken
- Charles Brodie as Charlie
- Deidre Mayne as Judy
- Peter Fontaine as Sergeant Brace
- Robert Robinson as young man
- John Drake as Constable Wilson
- Robert J. Mooney as Sergeant
- Van Boolen as night watchman

== Production ==
The film was made at Southall Studios in London. Location shooting took place around Southall and Chiswick. The film's sets were designed by the art director Herbert Smith.

== Critical reception ==
Monthly Film Bulletin said "A stereotypical and unremarkable small-scale thriller, with performances and direction adequate for the matter in hand."

Kine Weekly wrote: "Taut, handy-sized crime melodrama. ... There is plenty of action and a spot of popular romance to offset the rough stuff and its shrewdly chosen players, headed by Tom Drake, the American star, easily meet all acting and physical demands. ... The picture quickly gets down to brass tacks and resolute acting and direction keep the interest held. Tom Drake registers as the stolid, no-nonsense Miles, Maurice Kaufmann and Richard Shaw convince as crooks Don and Ken, William Hartnell is responsible for a neat cameo as Tracy, and Shirley Eaton pleases as Sue. The interiors and exteriors are adequate, and the climax hectic."

Picturegoer wrote: "Thankfully, the leading roles are handled with all seriousness and stoutly retread its worn, but by no means 'down to the canvas,' plot."

The Daily Film Renter wrote: "The photography is creditable and performances competent, apart from a tendency at times to overact. Pace ambles into a easy allegro and never quite reaches crescendo and there is a lack of development."

In British Sound Films: The Studio Years 1928–1959 David Quinlan rated the film as "mediocre", writing: "Follows a well-worn path."

The Cinema described it as "a very useful co-feature ... capable direction and well-handled suspense."
