= Never Trust a Gambler =

1951 film by Ralph Murphy

- Directed by: Ralph Murphy
- Screenplay by: Jesse Lasky Jr. (as Jesse L. Lasky Jr.); Jerome Odium
- Story by: Jerome Odium
- Produced by: Louis B. Appleton; Monty Shaff
- Starring: Dane Clark; Cathy O'Donnell; Tom Drake
- Cinematography: Allen G. Siegler
- Edited by: Al Clark
- Music by: Arthur Morton
- Color process: Black and white
- Production company: Columbia Pictures
- Distributed by: Columbia Pictures
- Release date: July 19, 1951 (New York)
- Running time: 79 minutes
- Country: United States
- Language: English

Never Trust a Gambler is a 1951 American film noir crime film directed by Ralph Murphy and starring Dane Clark, Cathy O'Donnell and Tom Drake.

== Plot ==
Steve Garry, insisting he has quit gambling, asks his ex-wife Virginia Merrill if he can lie low at her Los Angeles house while avoiding testifying in a murder trial. She reluctantly consents, unsure whether she can trust him, and hides him from nosy neighbor, Phoebe.

At a market, buying Steve food and liquor, Virginia runs into a police sergeant, McCloy, who dated Dolores Alden, her former roommate. McCloy won't go away, escorting Virginia home, then making a drunken pass at her. Steve emerges from hiding and hits McCloy with a chair, accidentally killing him.

Sgt. Ed Donovan has been out looking for Steve, who is actually a suspect in that murder case coming to trial. Donovan is called to the scene when McCloy's body is found near a car that's gone off a cliff. Steve pushed it there, hoping to make it look like the cop drove drunk and caused his own death. McCloy's partner, Lou Brecker, investigates as well. Donovan finds the name of Dolores on the body and questions her, which in turn leads him to her friend, Virginia.

Steve flees, taking Virginia along by force. While avoiding roadblocks, they pull into a gas station, where Virginia leaves a note for an attendant to find. As the cops close in, Steve takes off on foot, climbing a crane and wounding Donovan with a gunshot. As he tries to descend, Steve is grabbed by Donovan and plummets to his death.

== Cast ==
- Dane Clark as Steve
- Cathy O'Donnell as Virginia
- Tom Drake as Sgt. Donovan
- Jeff Corey as Lou Brecker
- Myrna Dell as Dolores
- Rhys Williams as Sgt. McCloy
- Kathryn Card as Phoebe

== Reception ==
In a contemporary review for The New York Times, critic Howard Thompson wrote: "This little cat-and-mouse drama does pretty well, in fact, for a project that starts unreeling with three strikes against it. First is an obviously inexpensive budget. The principals ... are personal but not particularly incisive performers. Furthermore, the plot ... gets more pat and familiar as it moves along. For at least two-thirds of the way, though, the picture isn't hard to take at all. But a typical, tacked-on chase ... dulls the preceding niceties and makes the whole thing seem inconsequential, which it probably is, anyway."
