= Nobody Wants to Be Alone (song) =

Single by Crystal Gayle

from the album Nobody Wants to Be Alone
- B-side: "Coming to the Dance"
- Released: March 23, 1985
- Genre: Country
- Length: 3:45
- Label: Warner Bros. Nashville
- Songwriter(s): Michael Masser, Kye Fleming
- Producer(s): Michael Masser

Crystal Gayle singles chronology
"Me Against the Night" (1984)	"Nobody Wants to Be Alone" (1985)	"A Long and Lasting Love" (1985)

"Nobody Wants to Be Alone" is a song written by Michael Masser and Kye Fleming, and recorded by American country music artist Crystal Gayle. It was released in March 1985 as the first single and title track from the album Nobody Wants to Be Alone. The song reached number 3 on the Billboard Hot Country Singles & Tracks chart.

== Chart performance ==
Chart (1985)	Peak position
US Hot Country Songs (Billboard)	3
Canadian RPM Country Tracks	4
