= The Judas Project =

- Theatrical release poster
- Directed by: James H. Barden
- Written by: James H. Barden
- Produced by: James H. Barden
- Starring: John O'Banion; Ramy Zada; Richard Herd; Gerald Gordon; Jeff Corey
- Edited by: Noreen Zepp-Linden
- Music by: James H. Barden
- Production company: Judas Project
- Distributed by: GoodTimes Entertainment, R.S. Entertainment
- Release date: February 19, 1993 (USA)
- Running time: 97 minutes
- Country: United States
- Language: English
- Box office: $2,932,790

The Judas Project is a 1990 action drama film directed and written by James H. Barden. The story of the movie shows a fictionalized retelling of the story of Jesus if it had occurred in the late 20th century. The film stars John O'Banion, Ramy Zada, Richard Herd, Gerald Gordon, and Jeff Corey. It was completed in December 1990 and released on February 19, 1993 by the now defunct GoodTimes Entertainment. The film was rated PG-13 due to the crucifixion scene.

== Synopsis ==
Humanity is in peril, therefore God sends his son in the form of a man named Jesse (John O'Banion) to save mankind from the impending terror that is to come.

== Cast ==
=== Main cast ===
- John O'Banion as Jesse
- Ramy Zada as Jude
- Richard Herd as Arthur Cunningham

Additional

- Gerald Gordon as Jackson
- Jeff Corey as Poneras
- Sue Amick as Mother
- Steven Anderson as James
- Richard Arnold as John
- Ari Barak as DeCarmo
- Ray Holtman as Pete
- J. Michael Hunter as Andy
- Nancy Duerr as Judith Childs
- Slavitza Jovan as Asa

== Reception ==
The film received negative reviews from critics.

Joe Leydon of Variety said of the film, "“The Judas Project”– which bears a 1990 copyright, and contains a couple of dated references to the USSR — is an embarrassingly amateurish piece of work, altogether unworthy of its subject. The acting seldom rises above the level of that found in religious instructional shorts for very small children. The screenplay is notably short on inspiration, divine or otherwise, and the direction is clunky." John Hartl of The Seattle Times also said in his review that, "The writer-director-producer, James H. Barden, follows the biblical story so closely that Jesus/Jesse has nothing new to say to the 20th century. There's no attempt to imagine the passion in modern terms, as Denys Arcand did so eloquently in "Jesus of Montreal."".

Ted Baehr of Christian movie review website Movieguide gave the film 2 stars on a 'fair' stance according to the websites rating system, and briefly wrote, "Though the action is a little slow at first, the drama and the performances are quite acceptable, and the special effects are very good."
