= First Night (Jane Olivor album) =

Studio album by Jane Olivor
- Released: 1976
- Genre: Folk
- Length: 34:34
- Label: Columbia Records
- Producer: Jason Darrow

Jane Olivor chronology
First Night (1976)	Chasing Rainbows (1977)

Professional ratings
Review scores
Source	Rating
AllMusic	4/5 stars
Robert Christgau	C−

First Night is Jane Olivor's debut album. It was released in 1976 via Columbia Records.

== Critical reception ==
William Ruhlmann stated in his AllMusic review that "Olivor seemed at the start of her career to be creating a new form of light pop music that plumbed the complex emotional depths first investigated by confessional singer/songwriters, yet employed a sophistication associated with an earlier generation of singers."

Jonathan Frank of Talkin Broadway wrote, First Night was named Album of the Year by Stereo Review. Her early reviews compared her to Barbra Streisand and Edith Piaf. Coast to Coast Tickets and Corporate Artists verified this as well.

The New York Times wrote that "within the stylistic context in which [Olivor] works, First Night is a fine record."

Robert Christgau was critical of the album, writing that "her LP is marginally adventurous, but if she becomes a star it will be by embodying the half of Barbra Streisand that Bette Midler put in the garbage."

== Track listing ==
No.	Title	Writer(s)	Length
1.	"My First Night Alone Without You"	Kin Vassy	5:00
2.	"Come Softly to Me"	Gretchen Christopher; Barbara Ellis; Gary Troxel	2:16
3.	"Morning, Noon and Nighttime"	Dick Monda; Chris Sciarrotta	3:50
4.	"Better Days"	Melissa Manchester; Carole Bayer Sager	2:49
5.	"L'important C'est La Rose"	Gilbert Bécaud; Louis Amade	2:49
6.	"Carousel of Love"	Jeremy Stone; Jason Darrow	2:30
7.	"Vincent"	Don McLean	3:41
8.	"One More Ride on the Merry-Go-Round"	Neil Sedaka; Howard Greenfield	3:57
9.	"Some Enchanted Evening"	Richard Rodgers; Oscar Hammerstein II	3:29
10.	"Turn Away"	Jeremy Stone; Jason Darrow	4:13
Total length:			34:34

All track information and credits were taken from the CD liner notes.

== Charts ==
Chart (1976/77)	Position
Australia (Kent Music Report)	70
