= Chasing Rainbows (album) =

Studio album by Jane Olivor
- Released: 1977
- Genre: Folk
- Length: 30:55
- Label: Columbia Records
- Producer: Tom Catalano

Jane Olivor chronology
First Night (1976)	Chasing Rainbows (1977)	Stay the Night (1978)

Professional ratings
Review scores
Source	Rating
Allmusic	4.5/5 stars

Chasing Rainbows is the second studio album by Jane Olivor.

== Track listing ==
No.	Title	Writer(s)	Length
1.	"I'm Always Chasing Rainbows"	Harry Carroll; Joseph McCarthy	2:55
2.	"Lalena"	Donovan Leitch	2:56
3.	"The Big Parade"	Howard Greenfield; Neil Sedaka	2:32
4.	"The French Waltz"	Adam Mitchell	3:08
5.	"You Wanna Be Loved"	Lewis Anderson; Becky Hobbs	3:22
6.	"You"	Randy Edelman	3:24
7.	"It's Over Goodbye"	Gene Cotton	3:08
8.	"Come In From The Rain"	Melissa Manchester; Carole Bayer Sager	3:58
9.	"Beautiful Sadness"	Lee Holdridge; Molly Ann Leiken	3:53
10.	"I'm Always Chasing Rainbows (Reprise)"	Carroll; McCarthy	1:39
Total length:			30:55

All track information and credits were taken from the CD liner notes.
