= The Beginning or the End =

1947 film by Norman Taurog

- 1947 theatrical poster
- Directed by: Norman Taurog
- Screenplay by: Frank "Spig" Wead
- Story by: Robert Considine
- Produced by: Samuel Marx
- Starring: Brian Donlevy; Robert Walker; Tom Drake; Beverly Tyler; Audrey Totter; Hume Cronyn
- Cinematography: Ray June
- Edited by: George Boemler
- Music by: Daniele Amfitheatrof
- Production company: Metro-Goldwyn-Mayer
- Distributed by: Loew's Inc.
- Release date: March 7, 1947
- Running time: 112 minutes
- Country: United States
- Language: English
- Budget: $2.6 million
- Box office: $1.9 million

The Beginning or the End is a 1947 American docudrama film about the development of the atomic bomb in World War II, directed by Norman Taurog, starring Brian Donlevy, Robert Walker, and Tom Drake, and released by Metro-Goldwyn-Mayer. The film dramatizes the creation of the atomic bomb in the Manhattan Project and the bombing of Hiroshima.

The film originated in October 1945 as a project of actress Donna Reed and her high school science teacher, Edward R. Tompkins, who was a chemist at the Oak Ridge National Laboratory. Bob Considine wrote the treatment, which was sent to MGM scriptwriters. The title was supplied by President Harry S. Truman. At the time there was a legal requirement that permission be obtained to depict living well-known public figures. Many refused, but others, such as J. Robert Oppenheimer, co-operated. Major General Leslie R. Groves, Jr., the director of the Manhattan Project, was hired as a consultant for $10,000 (equivalent to $165,000 in 2025).

Although the filmmakers put considerable effort into historical accuracy, particularly in details, the film is known for some key distortions of history. An entirely fictional sequence was added in which Truman agonizes over whether to authorize the attack; anti-aircraft shells are shown bursting around the Enola Gay on its bombing run over Hiroshima. The film received generally mixed reviews, and was a box office disappointment.

== Plot ==
A prelude scene in the form of a Newsreel story suggests that the film is part of a package of information about the development of atomic energy and the atomic bomb being placed in a time capsule in California, to be opened in 2446.

Physicist and atomic scientist Dr. J. Robert Oppenheimer praises the discovery of atomic energy but also warns of its dangers. American scientists such as Matt Cochran, working under the guidance of Dr. Enrico Fermi and Dr. Marré, have split the atom, and essentially beaten the Germans in the race to devise an atomic bomb. With the assistance of Albert Einstein, they inform President Franklin D. Roosevelt that a monumental discovery has been made.

In 1941, with the United States at war, Roosevelt authorizes up to two billion dollars for the Manhattan Project to develop an atomic bomb. In December 1942, at the University of Chicago, under the watchful eyes of observers such as Lieutenant Colonel Jeff Nixon and international experts, scientists create the first chain reaction, under a stadium at the campus.

Nixon is assigned to General Leslie Groves, who is placed in charge of the project. Groves has to bring together the scientific, industrial and defense communities to build a working atomic bomb during the war. In 1945, following the death of Roosevelt, the new president, Harry S. Truman, continues to support the atomic project, then moved to Los Alamos, New Mexico. Facing stiff resistance in the Pacific War, Truman orders the use of the atomic bomb against Japan in July 1945.

Cochran and Nixon are assigned to accompany the crew transporting the bomb to Tinian. While assembling the bomb, Cochran comes into contact with radioactive material and dies. The following day, on August 6, 1945, the Enola Gay, a Boeing B-29 Superfortress, drops an atomic bomb on Hiroshima. After the mission, Nixon returns home to break the news of Cochran's death to his wife.

== Cast ==
- Brian Donlevy as Major General Leslie R. Groves
- Robert Walker as Major, Lieutenant Colonel, later Colonel, Jeff Nixon
- Tom Drake as Matt Cochran
- Beverly Tyler as Anne Cochran
- Audrey Totter as Jean O'Leary
- Hume Cronyn as Dr. J. Robert Oppenheimer
- Hurd Hatfield as Dr. John Wyatt
- Joseph Calleia as Dr. Enrico Fermi
- Godfrey Tearle as President Franklin D. Roosevelt
- Victor Francen as Dr. Marre
- Richard Haydn as Dr. Chisholm
- Jonathan Hale as Dr. Vannevar Bush
- John Litel as K. T. Keller
- Henry O'Neill as General Thomas F. Farrell
- Warner Anderson as Captain William S. Parsons
- Barry Nelson as Colonel Paul Tibbets, Jr., pilot of the Enola Gay
- Art Baker as President Harry S. Truman
- Ludwig Stössel as Dr. Albert Einstein
- John Hamilton as Dr. Harold C. Urey
- Frank Ferguson as Dr. James B. Conant
- Tom Stevenson as Dr. E. P. Wigner
- John Gallaudet as Dr. Leo Szilard
- Moroni Olsen as Dr. Arthur H. Compton
- Norman Lloyd as Dr. Troyanski
- Charles Trowbridge as Walter S. Carpenter Jr.
- Henry Hall as General Brehon Somervell
- William Wright as Colonel John Lansdale
- James Bush as Dr. Ernest O. Lawrence
- Erville Alderson as Henry Stimson (uncredited)
- Guy Williams as Enola Gay bombardier (uncredited)

== Production ==
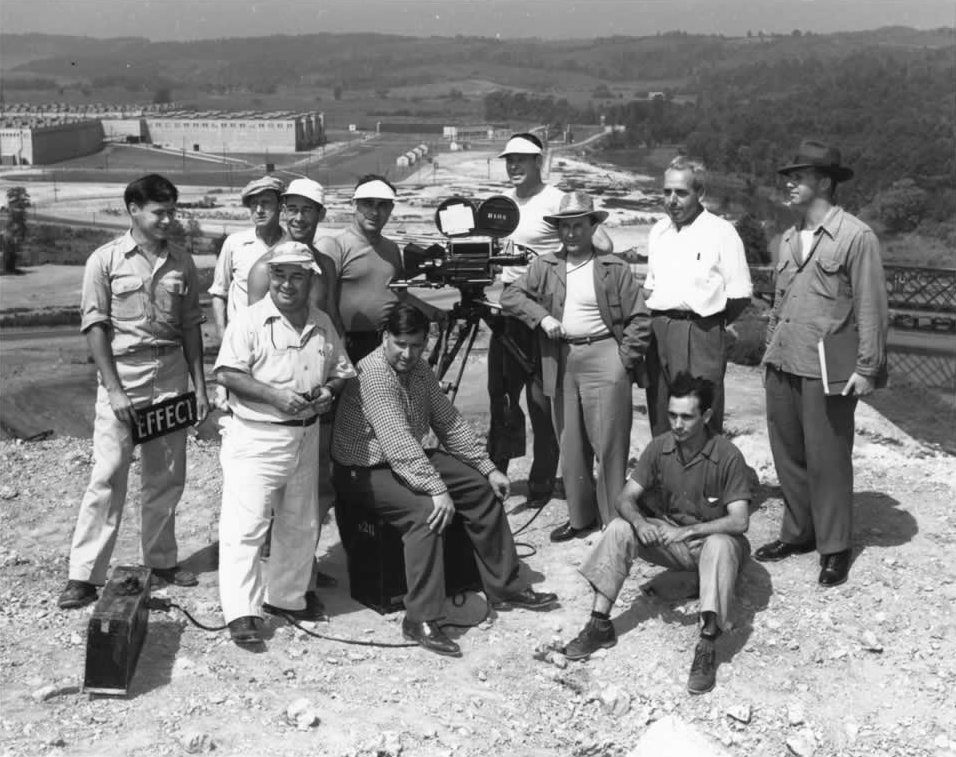
MGM camera crew at the K-25 gaseous diffusion plant, Oak Ridge, Tennessee, in July 1946

The idea for The Beginning or the End originated in October 1945 with actress Donna Reed, and her high school science teacher, Edward R. Tompkins, a chemist at the Oak Ridge National Laboratory. According to The Hollywood Reporter issues of December 1945 and January 1946, MGM, Paramount and 20th Century-Fox were all interested in making a film about the Manhattan Project. Paramount's Hal B. Wallis was already working on his own version, titled Top Secret, but agreed to merge his project with MGM's and hand over his story and research, offering to serve as an adviser on the MGM treatment in return for a fixed fee and a percentage of the box office gross.

The Beginning or the End had a number of working titles, including Atom Bomb, The Manhattan Project and Top Secret. Writer Bob Considine was hired to produce a treatment, which was submitted to MGM writers. The script underwent a number of revisions, with contributions from Robert Smith, Frank "Spig" Wead, Norman Krasna, David Hawkins, John Lee Mahin, Glenn Tryon, and Ayn Rand, who provided the montage of Hitler's conquests, a sequence in which a dying informant sends a message to Albert Einstein, and the scene in which President Franklin Roosevelt authorizes the Manhattan Project. Producer Samuel Marx wrote the opening narration. Marx and Donna Reed's husband Tony Owen met with President Harry S. Truman to secure his approval. At their meeting, Truman is reported to have said: "Gentlemen, make a motion picture. Tell the people of this nation that for them it is the beginning or the end," his last four words supplying the movie with its title.

H. T. Wensel from the National Bureau of Standards, Tompkins, and W. Bradford Shank from the Los Alamos National Laboratory, acted as technical advisers. Relations between MGM and the scientists soon soured, as the scientists began asking for more accuracy, which required multiple script changes, and Tompkins eventually resigned. Oppenheimer sent David Hawkins, a philosophy professor from the University of California to act as a mediator between Marx and the scientists. Although the original intention was that a substantial sum of money would be donated to scientists' associations like the Federation of Atomic Scientists, in the end, no money was paid out. Tompkins received payment of one hundred dollars (equivalent to $2,000 in 2025). At the time, there was a legal requirement that permission be obtained to depict living well-known public figures in films. Lise Meitner, Niels Bohr and Sir James Chadwick all refused to allow their names to be used in the film, which Marx regarded as unfortunate, as it deprived the film's Manhattan Project scenes of some of their international character.

The loss of Bohr caused important sequences to be deleted. The script originally had Bohr, rescued from the Germans in Denmark, bring a shocked Oppenheimer news that the German nuclear weapon project was supplying expertise to its Japanese counterpart. A German submarine was to be portrayed carrying a fictional scientist to Japan to join the Japanese project in Hiroshima. Vannevar Bush objected to the way the script depicted him as having doubts about whether a bomb that could fit into an aircraft could be built in time. Bush insisted that he had been confident of both, and the script was softened to reflect this.

Oppenheimer raised no objection to the sequence in the film in which he informed Brigadier General Thomas Farrell that the odds of a runaway explosion destroying the planet were less than one in a million, although he told MGM that he never said this. The cultured Oppenheimer's main concern was that the script was poor, with characters that were "stilted, lifeless, and without purpose or insight."

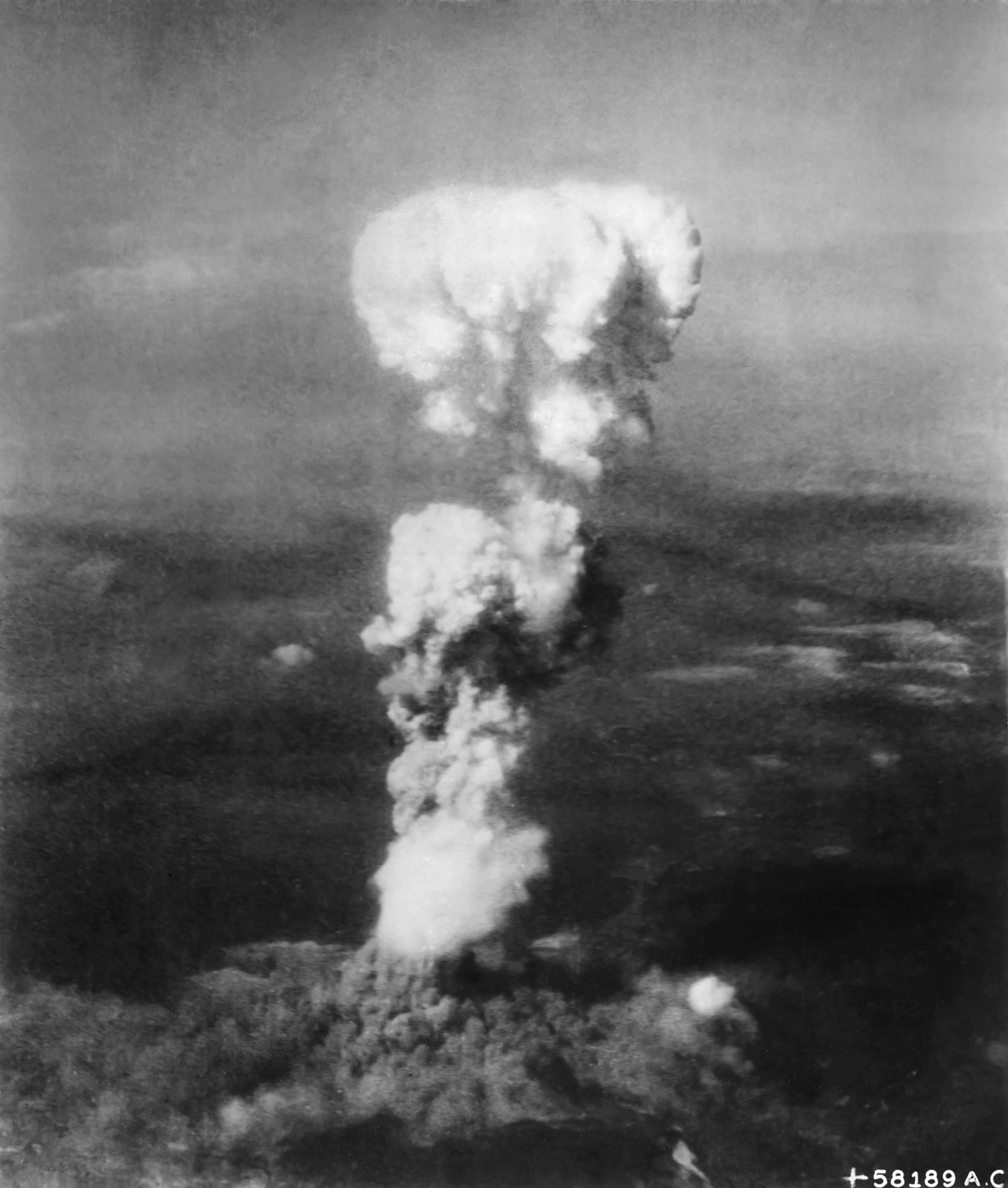
The mushroom cloud over Hiroshima after the dropping of Little Boy

Military technical advisers for The Beginning or the End included Colonel William A. Considine, Groves's assistant in charge of Security and Public Relations, Major Glen W. Landreth, Major Paul Van Sloun and Lieutenant Colonel Charles W. Sweeney, the pilot of Bockscar, the bomber that dropped the atomic bomb on Nagasaki. Scientists were alarmed by reports that MGM leading man Clark Gable was being considered for the role of Groves, but were relieved when Brian Donlevy was cast instead. Donlevy usually appeared in villainous supporting roles and indeed, many of the actors cast in the movie appeari films noir: Hume Cronyn for The Postman Always Rings Twice; Joseph Calleia, for Gilda and Deadline at Dawn; and Ludwig Stössel for Fritz Lang's Cloak and Dagger. The portly Groves apparently had no objection to his portrayal by the slim and handsome Donlevy, except for the way in which he was shown bossing industrialists around. He had a scene in which he warned Roosevelt that the invasion of Japan would be opposed by Japanese atomic weapons deleted.

Eleanor Roosevelt objected to the casting of Lionel Barrymore as her late husband, due to political remarks that Barrymore had made about the president in 1944. Marx delayed Barrymore's scenes while she had a chance to read and respond to a letter Barrymore sent her explaining that his remarks had been misinterpreted, but she was not placated, and Barrymore was replaced in the role by Godfrey Tearle. The War Department and the White House reviewed the script, and both asked for changes. The Army had objected to a scene in which an Army major made a pass at a girl and it was cut from the film, as the Army felt that this was poor conduct for an officer.

The casual way that Truman and Groves were shown to decide to use the bomb, with Truman stating that "I think more of our American boys than I do of all our enemies", while accurate, troubled columnist and social commentator Walter Lippmann, who felt that it could lead to foreigners being fearful of atomic weapons being in American hands. It was replaced with a scene where Truman (shown from back only) agonizes over whether to authorize the attack or not. In it, Truman asserts to his press secretary that dropping the bomb will shorten the war, and a "year less of war will mean life for ... from 300,000 to half a million of America's finest youth".

The motion picture censors asked for further cuts. Derogatory references to Mexicans were removed, as was an off-color joke about the effects of exposure to radioactive substances ("Is it true if you fool around with that stuff you don't like girls anymore?" "Not that I've noticed"), and one about politics ("I got it confidential−we're makin' the front ends of horses. We ship 'em to Washington to hook on to the other end.")

Principal photography for The Beginning or the End began on April 29, 1946, and continued until July 25 with retakes beginning on August 9, 1946. The production premiered in Washington, D.C., on February 19, 1947, with the national release of the film following on March 7, 1947.

== Historical accuracy ==
The filmmakers put considerable effort into many details for historical accuracy, such as military uniforms, and the details of the Enola Gay and its crew. Nine of the actors who portrayed the Enola Gay crew were actual veterans of World War II. Guy Williams made his film debut as the bombardier who releases the weapon over Hiroshima. The correct names of the accompanying aircraft are shown, although the photography plane was only named Necessary Evil after the Nagasaki mission.

By comparison, the technical details of atomic processes and the bomb's design are wildly inaccurate by intention. In 1947, these details were highly classified. No mention was made of the rich source of pitchblende supplied from the Congolese Shinkolobwe mine, and all refining of uranium was portrayed as only coming from Canadian mines. Another inaccuracy, introduced purely for dramatic effect, is the portrayal of anti-aircraft shells bursting around the aircraft on the bombing run, as the attack on Hiroshima was not opposed. (Note: However, the raid on Nagasaki was engaged by Japanese anti-aircraft fire.)

The film twice refers to supposed specific leaflet drops on the target for ten days in advance of the mission warning the citizens of the forthcoming raid. "We've been dropping warning leaflets on them for ten days now", one crew member remarks, "That's ten days more warning than they gave us before Pearl Harbor." However, there was no leaflet specifically warning of an atomic attack. In his review in the Bulletin of the Atomic Scientists, physicist Harrison Brown called this "the most horrible falsification of history". Historians have debated whether any leaflets were dropped at all.

This incident in which "Cochran" receives a fatal dose of radiation while assembling the Hiroshima bomb is a highly fictionalized reference to the deaths of Harry Daghlian and Louis Slotin, members of the Manhattan Project who died after contact with radioactive material on 21 August 1945 and 21 May 1946. (The deaths of Daghlian and Slotin were later fictionalized in Dexter Masters’s 1955 novel The Accident.)

In his award-winning book, The Beginning or the End: How Hollywood—and America—Learned to Stop Worrying and Love the Bomb (July 2020), historian and journalist Greg Mitchell explores "the shocking and significant story of how the White House and Pentagon scuttled an epic Hollywood production."

== Release ==
=== Box office ===
According to MGM records, The Beginning or the End was made on a budget of $2,632,000 (equivalent to $43,455,000 in 2025), but earned $1,221,000 (equivalent to $20,159,000 in 2025) in the United States and Canada and $721,000 (equivalent to $11,904,000 in 2025) elsewhere, resulting in a loss to the studio of $1,596,000 (equivalent to $26,350,000 in 2025).

=== Critical reception ===
Although The Beginning or the End was the first film to depict the story of the atomic bomb, both critics and the public were confused by the attempt to merge real events and fiction in a docudrama form. Bosley Crowther of The New York Times commented that "despite its generally able reenactments, this film is so laced with sentiment of the silliest and most theatrical nature that much of its impressiveness is marred."

Variety, however, described the film as a "portentous tale in broad strokes of masterful scripting and production", and a "sum credit of everybody concerned that the documentary values are sufficiently there without becoming static".

Time was less positive, noting that, "even as entertainment ... the picture seldom rises above cheery imbecility." In his Bulletin of the Atomic Scientists review, Harrison Brown considered the movie "poor", with a romantic angle "insipid in the extreme", but was most troubled by way scientific equipment was "over-glamorized" in the film, which he felt gave "a completely false impression of how scientists work."

== See also ==
- Day One (1989)
- Fat Man and Little Boy (1989)
- Nuclear Secrets, TV mini-series (2007)
- Manhattan, television series (2014–15)
- Oppenheimer (2023)
