= The Best Side of Goodbye =

Studio album by Jane Olivor
- Released: 1980
- Genre: Folk
- Length: 38:47
- Label: Columbia
- Producer: Louie Shelton; Michael Masser; Jason Darrow

Jane Olivor chronology
| Stay the Night (1978) | The Best Side of Goodbye (1980) | Jane Olivor in Concert (1982) |

Professional ratings
Review scores
| Source | Rating |
|---|---|
| AllMusic | 3/5 stars |

The Best Side of Goodbye is the fourth album by Jane Olivor, issued by Columbia Records. Joe Viglione writes in his AllMusic review that "The Best Side of Goodbye stands on its own as a valuable look at a valuable artist. It has a special power and some of its moments are quite moving."

== Track listing ==
| No. | Title | Writer(s) | Length |
|---|---|---|---|
| 1. | "Manchild Lullaby" | Leida Snow; Stephen Schwartz | 4:22 |
| 2. | "A Long and Lasting Love" | Gerry Goffin; Michael Masser | 3:48 |
| 3. | "Golden Pony" | Kaye Dunham; Bob Gundry | 3:21 |
| 4. | "Weeping Willows, Cattails" | Gordon Lightfoot | 3:54 |
| 5. | "To Love Again" | Gerry Goffin; Michael Masser | 4:37 |
| 6. | "Don't Let Go Of Me" | Randy Edelman | 3:31 |
| 7. | "Love This Time" | Pete McCann | 3:48 |
| 8. | "The Best Side of Goodbye" | Gerard Cohen; Michael Berardi; Richard Berardi | 3:39 |
| 9. | "The Greatest Love of All" | Linda Creed; Michael Masser | 4:48 |
| 10. | "Vagabond" | Eddy Marnay; Cyril Assous | 2:59 |
| Total length: | | | 38:47 |

All track information and credits were taken from the CD liner notes.

  - Note: Track 9, "The Greatest Love of All", was originally recorded by (and a minor hit for) smooth jazz guitarist George Benson; it would later go on to be a smash hit for pop/soul singer Whitney Houston in 1986.

== Charts ==
| Chart (1980) | Position |
|---|---|
| United States (Billboard 200) | 58 |
| Australia (Kent Music Report) | 95 |
