= Me Against the Night =

Single by Crystal Gayle

from the album Cage the Songbird
- B-side: "You Made a Fool of Me"
- Released: October 27, 1984
- Genre: Country
- Length: 2:53
- Label: Warner Bros. Nashville
- Songwriter(s): Pat Bunch, Pam Rose, Mary Ann Kennedy
- Producer(s): Jimmy Bowen

Crystal Gayle singles chronology
| "Turning Away" (1984) | "Me Against the Night" (1984) | "Nobody Wants to Be Alone" (1985) |

"Me Against the Night" is a song written by Pat Bunch, Pam Rose, and Mary Ann Kennedy, and recorded by American country music artist Crystal Gayle. It was released in October 1984 as the fourth single from the album Cage the Songbird. The song reached number 4 on the Billboard Hot Country Singles & Tracks chart.

== Chart performance ==
| Chart (1984–1985) | Peak position |
|---|---|
| US Hot Country Songs (Billboard) | 4 |
| Canadian RPM Country Tracks | 1 |
