= Warner Anderson =

American actor (1911–1976)

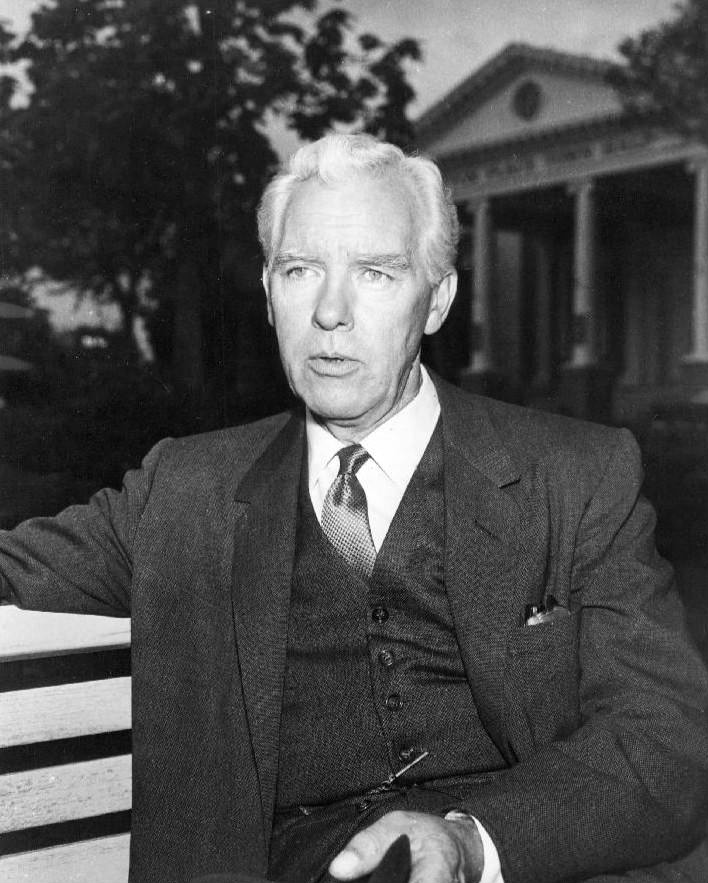
- Anderson as Matthew Swain in Peyton Place.
- Born: March 10, 1911; Brooklyn, New York, U.S.
- Died: August 26, 1976 (aged 65); Santa Monica, California, U.S.
- Occupation: Actor
- Years active: 1916–1975
- Spouse: Leeta Anderson

Warner Anderson (March 10, 1911 – August 26, 1976) was an American actor, best known for his starring roles in TV dramas The Lineup and Peyton Place.

== Early years ==
Anderson was born to "a theatrical family" in Brooklyn, New York, March 10, 1911. He was a Republican.

== Film ==
Anderson had a small part in a film in 1915. A contemporary newspaper article about the movie Sunbeam, in which Anderson appeared in 1917, noted, "Warner Anderson is one of the cleverest children in motion pictures." "He made his adult screen debut in This Is the Army in 1943.

He had supporting parts in several films through the years. They included The Caine Mutiny, Blackboard Jungle, and Destination Tokyo. Operation Burma with Errol Flynn.

== Stage ==
Anderson's work on stage included Broadway appearances in Maytime (1917–1918), Happiness (1917–1918), Medea (1920), Within Four Walls (1923), Broken Journey (1942), and Remains to Be Seen (1951–1952).

== Radio ==
In the 1940s, Anderson was the announcer for The Bell Telephone Hour.

== Television ==
Anderson starred as Lt. Ben Guthrie in the TV series The Lineup, which ran from 1954 to 1960. In syndication, reruns of The Lineup were broadcast under the title San Francisco Beat. His The Lineup costar was Tom Tully. Anderson played the same role in the 1958 film The Lineup.

He played newspaper publisher Matthew Swain on the TV series Peyton Place. He also served as the narrator at the beginning of each episode. He continued as narrator even after his character was written out of the series.

== Death ==
Anderson died August 26, 1976, at the age of 65, in a hospital in Santa Monica, California. He was survived by his wife and a son.

== Partial filmography ==
- The Sunbeam (1916) as Bobby Rutherford
- This Is the Army (1943) as Kate Smith's Announcer (uncredited)
- Destination Tokyo (1943) as Andy
- Objective, Burma! (1945) as Col. J. Carter
- Dangerous Partners (1945) as Miles Kempen
- Her Highness and the Bellboy (1945) as Paul MacMillan
- Week-End at the Waldorf (1945) as Dr. Robert Campbell
- Abbott and Costello in Hollywood (1945) as Norman Royce
- My Reputation (1946) as Frank Everett
- Bad Bascomb (1946) as Luther Mason
- Faithful in My Fashion (1946) as Walter Medcraft
- Three Wise Fools (1946) as The O'Monahan
- The Arnelo Affair (1947) as Det. Sam Leonard
- The Beginning or the End (1947) as Captain William S. Parsons U.S.N.
- Dark Delusion (1947) as Teddy Selkirk
- Song of the Thin Man (1947) as Dr. Monolaw
- High Wall (1947) as Dr. George Poward
- Alias a Gentleman (1948) as Capt. Charlie Lopen
- Tenth Avenue Angel (1948) as Joseph Mills
- Command Decision (1948) as Colonel Earnest Haley
- The Lucky Stiff (1949) as Eddie Britt
- The Doctor and the Girl (1949) as Dr. George Esmond
- Destination Moon (1950) as Dr. Charles Cargraves
- Santa Fe (1951) as Dave Baxter
- Only the Valiant (1951) as Trooper Rutledge
- Go For Broke (1951) as Col. Charles W. Pence
- Bannerline (1951) as Roy
- Detective Story (1951) as Endicott Sims
- The Blue Veil (1951) as Bill Parker
- The Star (1952) as Harry Stone
- The Last Posse (1953) as Robert Emerson
- A Lion Is in the Streets (1953) as Jules Bolduc
- The Yellow Tomahawk (1954) as Major Ives
- The Caine Mutiny (1954) as Capt. Blakely
- Drum Beat (1954) as Gen. Canby
- The Violent Men (1954) as Jim McCloud
- Blackboard Jungle (1955) as Dr. Bradley
- A Lawless Street (1955) as Hamer Thorne
- The Lineup (1958) as Lt. Ben Guthrie
- Armored Command (1961) as Lt. Col. Wilson
- Rio Conchos (1964) as Col. Wagner
- The Bubble (1966) as Doctor (uncredited)
- Peyton Place (1964–1969, TV Series) as Narrator / Matthew Swain
- Bearcats! (1971, TV Series) as Mr. Huddleston
- The Rockford Files (1975, TV Series) as Alfred Bannister
