= Turning Away =

Song written by Tim Krekel

Single by Crystal Gayle

from the album Cage the Songbird
- B-side: "On Our Way to Love"
- Released: June 1984
- Genre: Country
- Length: 2:55
- Label: Warner Bros. Nashville
- Songwriter(s): Tim Krekel
- Producer(s): Jimmy Bowen

Crystal Gayle singles chronology
"I Don't Wanna Lose Your Love" (1984)	"Turning Away" (1984)	"Me Against the Night" (1984)

"Turning Away" is a song written by Tim Krekel, and recorded by American country music artist Crystal Gayle. It was released in June 1984 as the third single from the album Cage the Songbird. The song was Gayle's fourteenth number one single on the country chart. The single went to number one for one week and spent a total of thirteen weeks on the country chart.

== Charts ==
=== Weekly charts ===
Chart (1984)	Peak position
US Hot Country Songs (Billboard)	1
Canada Country Tracks (RPM)	1

=== Year-end charts ===
Chart (1984)	Position
US Hot Country Songs (Billboard)	29

== Shakin' Stevens version ==
"Turning Away"

Single by Shakin' Stevens

from the album Lipstick, Powder and Paint
- B-side: "Diddle I"
- Released: 27 January 1986
- Recorded: 1985
- Genre: Rock and roll
- Length: 3:20
- Label: Epic
- Songwriter(s): Tim Krekel
- Producer(s): Dave Edmunds; Shakin' Stevens (executive)

Shakin' Stevens singles chronology
"Merry Christmas Everyone" (1985)	"Turning Away" (1986)	"Because I Love You" (1986)

Two years later, Welsh rockabilly singer Shakin' Stevens covered the song for his album Lipstick, Powder and Paint and peaked at number 15 on the UK Singles Chart.

=== Track listings ===
7": Epic / A6819 (UK)

1. "Turning Away" – 3:20
2. "Diddle I" – 2:58

12": Epic / TA 6819 (UK)

1. "Turning Away" (Extended Remix) – 4:25
2. "Diddle I" – 2:58

=== Charts ===
Chart (1986)	Peak position
Belgium (Ultratop 50 Flanders)	20
Ireland (IRMA)	11
UK Singles (OCC)	15
