= Scene of the Crime (1949 film) =

1949 American film by Roy Rowland

- theatrical release poster
- Directed by: Roy Rowland
- Screenplay by: Charles Schnee
- Based on: "Smashing the Bookie Gang Marauders"; 1947 story in Official Detective Stories by John Bartlow Martin
- Produced by: Harry Rapf
- Starring: Van Johnson; Gloria DeHaven; Arlene Dahl; Tom Drake
- Cinematography: Paul C. Vogel
- Edited by: Robert J. Kern
- Music by: André Previn
- Production company: Metro-Goldwyn-Mayer
- Distributed by: Loew's Inc.
- Release date: July 28, 1949 (New York City)
- Running time: 93-95 minutes
- Country: United States
- Language: English
- Budget: $761,000
- Box office: $1,391,000

Scene of the Crime is a 1949 American police procedural directed by Roy Rowland, starring Van Johnson, and featuring Gloria DeHaven, Arlene Dahl, and Tom Drake. The film's screenplay, by Charles Schnee, is based on a non-fiction article by John Bartlow Martin, "Smashing the Bookie Gang Marauders". It was the only property sold by Martin to be made into a film. Scene of the Crime was producer Harry Rapf's last film of his thirty-plus year career; he died of a heart attack a week after principal photography for the film began.

According to film critic Dennis Schwartz:

"[The film is one of the] few film noirs attempted by MGM. It came when Dore Schary was the studio head and insisted on producing more realistic films. This is a transitional film from the 1930s gangster film and a forerunner of the modern day TV cop show. It preaches the credo that 'Crime Does Not Pay'."

== Plot ==
Lieutenant Mike Conovan (Van Johnson), an LAPD homicide detective, investigates when Ed Monigan, an older member of his precinct (and former partner), is murdered. The fact that he was carrying $1,000 in cash confirms it wasn’t robbery, but instead raises the issue of whether he was on the take. Conovan's current partner and one-time mentor, Fred Piper (John McIntire), is getting on in years and his eyesight is failing, while under Conovan's wing rookie detective "C.C." (for "carbon copy") Gordon (Tom Drake) is learning the ropes.

Out to dispel a theory that Monigan was secretly in cahoots with bookmakers, Conovan begins to track down a pair of downstate guns for hire ("lobos", Spanish, for “wolves”). The trail leads to a cabaret singer, Lili (Gloria DeHaven), whose ex-boyfriend Turk Kingby (Richard Benedict) has apparently pulled off a series of robberies of gamblers with his partner Lafe Douque (William Haade). Conovan's primary informant, Sleeper (Norman Lloyd), is brutally murdered for snitching. Conovan tracks down Lafe and places him under arrest, but leaving Lafe's apartment, gunshots ring out, killing Lafe. Conovan’s wife Gloria (Arlene Dahl) worries that police work is too dangerous for him. He agrees, but keeps on the job.

Lili calls headquarters with a tip for Conovan on where Turk can be found. Piper intercepts the message, investigates it himself and is gunned down. Conovan concludes that Lili has been double-crossing him, secretly helping Turk all along. Turk and his new partner attempt to flee, but Conovan sets up an ambush. He uses a truck to crash into Turk's armor-plated car, causing it to catch fire. Turk confesses to the murders and clears Monigan before he dies.

== Cast ==
- Van Johnson as Mike Conovan
- Arlene Dahl as Gloria Conovan
- Gloria DeHaven as Lili
- Tom Drake as Detective "C.C." Gordon
- Leon Ames as Captain A.C. Forster
- John McIntire as Detective Fred Piper
- Donald Woods as Bob Herkimer
- Norman Lloyd as Sleeper
- Jerome Cowan as Arthur Webson
- Tom Powers as Umpire Menafoe
- Richard Benedict as Turk Kingby
- Anthony Caruso as Tony Rutzo
- Robert Gist as P.J. Pontiac
- Romo Vincent as Hippo
- Tom Helmore as Norrie Lorfield
- Caleb Peterson as Loomis
- William Haade as Lafe Douque

Cast notes

- Donna Reed was originally slated to play the part played in the film by Arlene Dahl.
- Gloria DeHaven's character, Lili, was modeled on stripper Lili St. Cyr

== Production ==
MGM, Hollywood's "Tiffany Studio", had a long history of making glamorous films, especially musicals, and shied away from making gutty, street-wise films, such as Warner Bros. specialized in. The exceptions were their series of "Crime Does Not Pay" shorts – where director Roy Rowland learned the ins and outs of that genre – and the occasional films in the 1930s and 1940s, such as Kid Glove Killer and Grand Central Murder, both released in 1942. Once Dore Schary returned to MGM in 1948 from his stint at RKO Pictures, to replace Louis B. Mayer as head of production, the studio began to make darker, more realistic films. Scene of the Crime was the result of that transition.

The casting for Scene of the Crime went "against type". Star Van Johnson was known for appearing in light fare such as comedies and musicals, making him a teen idol, so playing a cop was a complete change for him, and his newly revealed versatility garnered him roles in 1949's Battleground and the offer to play Eliot Ness in The Untouchables on TV, a role that went instead to Robert Stack. Although Scene of the Crime made a small profit, primarily because of its low production cost, Van Johnson would never make another film noir.

Gloria DeHaven was also making a change for her role in the film. She had been known for playing sweet, innocent ingenues, like Johnson, in comedies and musicals. It was Schary's decision to cast her as Lili, a cabaret singer who appears at first to have a heart of gold, but turns out to be a gangster's moll playing up to Johnson. Unable to show a stripper actually stripping, the film shows her doing a "reverse strip": Lili starts in a – for the time – skimpy outfit, and puts her clothes on while singing Andre Previn and William Katz' song "I'm a Goody Good Girl". As with Johnson, the film opened up new possibilities for DeHaven. Also playing against type, the glamorous, curvaceous Arlene Dahl plays a demure concerned housewife to Johnson’s cop.

Director Roy Rowland was a long-time stalwart at MGM, directing shorts, B-movies, and a variety of other films. He would make two additional film noirs, Rogue Cop and Witness to Murder, starring Barbara Stanwyck, both released in 1954. Rowland is probably best known for directing a cult film, The 5,000 Fingers of Dr. T., written by Dr. Seuss.

== Reception ==
=== Box office ===
According to MGM records, the film earned US$968,000 (equivalent to $13,098,462 in 2025) in the US and Canada and $423,000 (equivalent to $5,723,811 in 2025) overseas resulting in a profit of $151,000 (equivalent to $2,043,252 in 2025). Variety listed the film as a box office disappointment.

=== Critical ===
In his July 29, 1949 review for The New York Times, Bosley Crowther reassures his readers: “Leave it to Mr. Johnson and to Scriptwriter Charlie Schnee; sixty or seventy minutes later, the gunman is caught and the case solved. But, in the meantime, we've been quickly treated to a refresher course in the detection of crime, a glossary of underworld lingo and a couple of odes to the nobility of cops. We have also been privileged to make the acquaintance of several colorful underworld types….And, particularly, we have been permitted to observe Mr. Johnson making love in several assorted flavors, this being one of a good detective's chores. Not only does he nuzzle and coo most sublimely with his wife, who is played with considerable temptation by a new cutie, name of Arlene Dahl, but he also pitches plenty to a stream-lined night-club job from whom he would wring certain secrets of a purely professional sort. This dame played by Gloria De Haven, is quite a nifty, too. In both of his amorous assignments, Mr. Johnson will no doubt please his fans.…For in writing, direction and performance, "Scene of the Crime" is a flexible film that form-fits to Mr. Johnson's talents as a right glamourous gent. Witness dismissed.”

Modern film critic Dennis Schwartz likes the film, writing in 2004: "It is directed in a workman like efficiency by Roy Rowland (Rogue Cop) ... It's filmed Dragnet style, following ordinary police procedures in solving the case. The film had a violent conclusion, which underscores the dangers of being an urban cop. It portrayed the hard-working policemen in a sympathetic light and showed how they are often misunderstood by the public and betrayed at times by reporters who are eager to grab the headlines and run with them even though they don't have all the facts. Mike comes out as a good cop, but is disillusioned by his low pay and all the pressures from home, the job and its politics, and from an unappreciative public."

=== Awards and honors ===
- Edgar Award - Best Motion Picture (nominated, 1950)

== See also ==
- Film noir
