= Jane Olivor =

American singer (born 1947)

- Born: Linda Cohen; May 18, 1947 (age 79); Brooklyn, New York, U.S.
- Genres: Vocal, cabaret, pop
- Occupation: Singer
- Years active: 1970s–2009
- Labels: Columbia, Varèse Sarabande

Jane Olivor (born May 18, 1947) is an American singer. After releasing five albums from the late 1970s through the early 1980s, her stage fright, anxiety over her rapid success, and her husband's illness and death caused her to take a 10-year hiatus. She released five more albums from 1995 through 2004. Since 2009, she has been retired from the public eye.

== Early career ==
Olivor was born as Linda Cohen in Brooklyn, New York and reportedly grew up with a background in folk music, although her particular influences, she has said, were Johnny Mathis and Gene Pitney; the latter appeared on her 2000 album, Love Decides.

In her early days as a performer, Olivor played such venues as Brothers & Sisters and The Ballroom. She became known, notably among the gay community, for her interpretations of songs such as "Some Enchanted Evening" from the Broadway musical South Pacific and "Come Softly to Me", by The Fleetwoods. Early in her career she performed on several occasions as a guest artist on the BBC "jazz ship", the SS Rotterdam, sailing out of New York.

Credited as "Janie Olivor, stage performer", an early performance is captured in the 1975 film Saturday Night at the Baths, an independent film shot at the Continental Baths where, among others, Bette Midler got her start. In the film, historically important for its footage both of the bathhouse and of Olivor herself, Olivor sings an early version of "Pretty Girl". Written by Olivor with Kathy Wakefield, "Pretty Girl" later appeared on Olivor's In Concert and Safe Return albums.

== Albums 1976–1982 ==
Olivor also eased her way into the burgeoning New York City cabaret scene of the early 1970s. She appeared at Reno Sweeney (cabaret), owned and operated by Lewis Friedman and Eliot Hubbard, which Vito Russo described as "the center of the universe during the now-legendary cabaret revival of the early 1970s". Working steadily in the New York City cabaret scene, Olivor became noticeable enough for the Columbia Records label and the William Morris Agency to sign her. Her debut album, First Night, released in 1976, was named Stereo Review's Album of the Year.

In September 1977, her second album, Chasing Rainbows, was released to coincide with Olivor's debut at Carnegie Hall. The first pressing of the album contained a one-sided insert 45 RPM single of "Some Enchanted Evening", re-recorded by Olivor and produced by Charles Calello. Chasing Rainbows was produced by Tom Catalano, the longtime producer of many of Neil Diamond's hit singles and albums; Diamond was another influence and favorite of Olivor's. This album reached the Top 100 bestsellers, remaining in the charts for three months, and peaked at number 87 on the Billboard charts.

In 1978, Olivor released the album Stay the Night, with a title track, "Stay the Night" by composer Susan Casazza (previously called Maxie Green) and lyricist Norman Dolph. Olivor's slowed-down version from this album of The Chiffons' "He's So Fine", with its sinewy saxophone and multi-tracked Olivor vocals, became the biggest-selling single of her career and charted into Billboard's Top 100, peaking at number 77.

In between Stay the Night and the release of The Best Side of Goodbye, Olivor found herself busy with concerts and also toured as a special guest of Johnny Mathis. Their duet, "The Last Time I Felt Like This", was the theme for the 1978 film Same Time, Next Year. The song, with music by Marvin Hamlisch and lyrics by Alan Bergman and Marilyn Bergman, was nominated for a Golden Globe Award and an Academy Award.

The 51st Academy Awards ceremony in April 1979 marked the first time that all five of the nominated songs were performed by the artists who recorded them for the films themselves; Olivor and Mathis performed their "The Last Time I Felt Like This" duet live at the televised event. Olivor continued to headline at the Greek Theatre in Los Angeles, Carnegie Hall in New York, and other venues. Her fourth album, The Best Side of Goodbye, produced by Louie Shelton, Michael Masser, and Jason Darrow, was released in 1980 and climbed to number 58 on the Billboard charts. Columbia released the song "Don't Let Go of Me" as the album's only single.

Jane Olivor in Concert, her first live album, was recorded in December 1981 at the Berklee College of Music in Boston, and released in 1982. It included "Race to the End", a vocal version of Vangelis's instrumental theme from the film Chariots of Fire, and again "Stay the Night", as its singles.

== Performing hiatus ==
In 1983, her own stage fright, nervousness at the sudden onrush of fame, and numerous unfavorable experiences with the music industry led Olivor to schedule a six-month hiatus from both performing and the heavy pressures of her too-fast fame. That hiatus stretched to a ten-year break from recording when, in addition to her other challenges, her husband was diagnosed with prostate cancer six months after they married. Olivor put her career on hold to care for him until his death in 1986. In the meantime, she had disputes with Columbia Records over money.

== Return to performing and recording ==
After having sought and received treatment for depression in 1989, Olivor returned to performing in 1990 and discovered that her fan base had remained loyal to her throughout her absence.

In 1991, she sang "The Last Time I Felt Like This" with Johnny Mathis on the Oprah Winfrey Show, in support of the Columbia release Better Together, a compilation album featuring Johnny's most memorable duets. Gradually, she became more active, and in 2000 her first album in eighteen years, Love Decides, featuring Gene Pitney singing harmony on a remake of "Half Heaven, Half Heartache", was released, followed in 2001 by Songs of the Season.

On November 11, 2003, Olivor appeared at the Berklee Performance Center at Berklee College of Music in Boston, Massachusetts, where she taped Safe Return, a live album of music spanning her entire career. She had recorded her first live album, Jane Olivor in Concert, in the same venue in 1982, but except for a Christmas concert in 1999 had not performed there since. The concert was recorded as both an album and a DVD, and both were released in 2004.

In June 2004, Columbia Records released her greatest-hits collection, titled The Best of Jane Olivor. It is a compilation of her best-known songs, including the Academy Award–nominated song "The Last Time I Felt Like This" with Johnny Mathis. This is the first time that the duet has been issued on a Jane Olivor album.

After having toured extensively for about five years, Olivor once again took some time off. Her last concert was in December 2008.

== Charities and public services ==
Jane Olivor is a staunch supporter of animal rights, and she has taken an interest in the efforts of the Marin Humane Society.

== Discography ==
=== Albums ===
Title	Album details	Peak positions	
Title	Album details	US	AUS
First Night	Release date: 1976; Label: Columbia (USA)	—	70
Chasing Rainbows	Release date: 1977; Label: Columbia (USA)	86	—
Stay the Night	Release date: 1978; Label: Columbia (USA)	108	88
The Best Side of Goodbye	Release date: 1980; Label: Columbia (USA)	58	95
Enchanted Evening	Release date: 1981; Label: Columbia (USA)	—	33
Jane Olivor in Concert	Release date: 1982; Label: Columbia (USA)	144	—
So Fine	Release date: December 1, 1995; Label: Sony Special Products; Format: LP, CD, cassette	—	—
Love Decides	Release date: January 1, 2000; Label: Varèse Sarabande (USA)	—	—
Songs of the Season	Release date: January 1, 2001; Label: Varèse Sarabande	—	—
Safe Return (Live)	Release date: January 1, 2004; Label: PS Classics	—	—
The Best of Jane Olivor	Release date: June 22, 2004; Label: Legacy Recordings	—	—
"—" denotes releases that did not chart

=== Singles discography ===
Year	Single	Peak positions		Album
Year	Single	US	US AC	Album
1976	"One More Ride on the Merry-Go-Round"	—	—	First Night
1977	"Some Enchanted Evening"	91	—	First Night
1978	"He's So Fine"	77	21	Stay the Night
1978	"Stay the Night"	—	—	Stay the Night
1979	"The Last Time I Felt Like This" duet with Johnny Mathis	_	15	single release only
1980	"Don't Let Go of Me"	108	—	The Best Side of Goodbye
1982	"Race to the End (From The Hit Movie "Chariots Of Fire")"	—	—	Jane Olivor in Concert
"—" denotes releases that did not chart

=== As a featured artist ===
Year	Single	Peak positions			Album
Year	Single	US	US AC	AUS	Album
1979	"The Last Time I Felt Like This / As Time Goes By" (with Johnny Mathis)	—	15	98	The best Days of My Life Johnny Mathis
"—" denotes releases that did not chart
