= Some Enchanted Evening =

1949 show tune from the musical South Pacific

Song

from the album South Pacific
- Published: 1949
- Composer: Richard Rodgers
- Lyricist: Oscar Hammerstein II

"Some Enchanted Evening" is a show tune from the 1949 Rodgers and Hammerstein musical South Pacific. It has been described as "the single biggest popular hit to come out of any Rodgers and Hammerstein show." Andrew Lloyd Webber describes it as the "greatest song ever written for a musical".

The song is a three-verse solo for the leading male character, Emile, in which he describes first seeing a stranger, knowing that he will see her again, then dreaming of hearing her laughter and finally of feeling her call him. He sings that when you find your "true love", you must "fly to her side, and make her your own, / Or all through your life you may dream all alone." The song has been called "a marvelous distillation of love at first sight [but also] a reflection for mature people who've known it and lived it".

== In South Pacific ==
The song appears in the first act of the musical. It is sung as a solo by the show's male lead, Emile de Becque, a middle-aged French expatriate who has become a plantation owner on a South Pacific island during World War II. Emile falls in love with Ensign Nellie Forbush, an optimistic and naive young American navy nurse from Little Rock, Arkansas. The two have known each other for only a few weeks, and each worries that the other may not return his or her love. In the song, Emile expresses his romantic feelings for Nellie, recalling how they met at an officers' club dance and instantly were attracted to each other. He describes a man seeing a stranger and instantly knowing he will see her again, hearing her laughter and dreaming of it. He says that when you find your "true love", you must "fly to her side, and make her your own"; otherwise, all your life you will "dream all alone". He later asks her to marry him. The song is then reprised several times during the show by Nellie and/or Emile as their relationship experiences setbacks and reconciliations.

In the original Broadway production, "Some Enchanted Evening" was sung by former Metropolitan Opera star Ezio Pinza. Pinza won the Tony Award for Best Actor in 1950 for this role, and the song made him a favorite with audiences and listeners who normally did not attend or listen to opera. In the 2001 London revival of the show, Philip Quast won an Olivier Award for Best Actor for his role as Emile, and seven years later, international opera singer Paulo Szot won a Tony for his portrayal in the 2008 New York revival.

In the film version of South Pacific, the first and second scenes of the play are switched around. Because of the switch, Emile enters later in the film, and "Some Enchanted Evening" is not heard until nearly 45 minutes into the film, while in the original stage version it is heard about 15 minutes after Act I begins. In the film, the song is sung by Metropolitan Opera bass Giorgio Tozzi, who dubbed the singing for actor Rossano Brazzi. Tozzi's version finished at No. 28 on the 2004 American Film Institute list and television special, AFI's 100 Years...100 Songs, selecting the top 100 songs in American cinema.

== Analysis ==
According to Popular Music in America, the song's "lush orchestration, expansive form, and above all its soaring melody" allow the singer and character (Emile) to "linger in the moment" of immediate infatuation. Gerald Mast's history of the American musical notes that the song is a climactic moment which reveals that two characters have fallen in love, and it expresses a seize-the-opportunity lyric: "When you find your true love ... Then fly to her side / And make her your own". According to the running commentary on the 2006 Fox DVD release of the 1958 film version of South Pacific, Lehman Engel remembered that Oscar Hammerstein II wanted to write a song based around verbs but waited ten years to do so before he wrote this song, in which the verses are built around the verbs "see", "hear" and "fly".

== Selected recorded versions ==
Many popular singers have recorded and performed "Some Enchanted Evening". Perry Como's version was a #1 hit in 1949, and Frank Sinatra recorded the song several times.

- Ezio Pinza (recorded April 18, 1949, Original Broadway cast recording of South Pacific). His single version reached No. 7 in the Billboard charts in 1949.
- Perry Como (1949). His single reached No. 1 on the Billboard charts in 1949.
- Frank Sinatra (1949), (1963, including a duet with Rosemary Clooney), (1967). The 1949 version reached the No. 6 position in the Billboard charts.
- Bing Crosby (1949), recorded March 10, 1949 and reached No. 3 in the Billboard charts during a 20-week stay.
- Jo Stafford - Autumn in New York (1950). Her single version reached No. 4 in the Billboard charts in 1949.
- Jay & The Americans (1965). The group's single version reached No. 13 on the Hot 100, Billboard charts in 1965.
- Jane Olivor had a 1977 single release (#91 on the Billboard Hot 100: the track was taken from her 1976 debut album First Night.
- Bob Dylan (from his No.1 2015 album Shadows in the Night)
- Philip Quast for the 2002 London revival cast recording of South Pacific; he won the Olivier Award as Emile in that production
- Paulo Szot – South Pacific (The New Broadway Cast) (2008); he won the Tony Award as Emile in that production

== In popular culture ==
The song's title has been used as the name for albums, such as one by Blue Öyster Cult, one by Art Garfunkel and a cast album and PBS special of the revue "Some Enchanted Evening" – The Songs of Rodgers & Hammerstein. It was used as the name for television episodes in such TV series as The Simpsons, Last of the Summer Wine, Man About the House, and Bless This House.

The song has been sung in films and on TV shows, for example by Harrison Ford in the film American Graffiti (1978 reissue), by Alan Alda's character Hawkeye on MASH in season 4 episode 18 "Hawkeye", by an itinerant chanteuse in Crossing Delancey (1988), by Jon Bon Jovi on Ally McBeal in the episode "Homecoming" (2002) and by Bert in episode 102 on The Muppet Show (1977) to Connie Stevens. In April 2023, the song featured in the BBC Radio 4 series Soul Music.
