= Cage the Songbird =

Studio album by Crystal Gayle
- Released: October 17, 1983
- Studios: Sound Stage, Nashville, Tennessee; Warner Bros. Recording Studios, Los Angeles, California
- Genre: Country
- Length: 31:16
- Label: Warner Bros. Nashville
- Producer: Jimmy Bowen

Crystal Gayle chronology
True Love (1982)	Cage the Songbird (1983)	Crystal Gayle's Greatest Hits (1983)

Singles from Cage the Songbird
- 1. "The Sound of Goodbye" Released: October 1983; 2. "I Don't Wanna Lose Your Love" Released: February 25, 1984; 3. "Turning Away" Released: June 1984; 4. "Me Against the Night" Released: October 27, 1984

Professional ratings
Review scores
Source	Rating
Allmusic	3/5 stars

Cage the Songbird is the eleventh studio album by American country music singer Crystal Gayle. Released on October 17, 1983, it peaked at #5 on the Billboard Country Album chart. Four of the album's tracks became Top 5 hits on the Country Singles chart, with two of them reaching #1. Chronologically they were "The Sound of Goodbye" (#1), "I Don't Wanna Lose Your Love" (#2), "Turning Away" (#1), and "Me Against the Night" (#4).

The title song, "Cage the Songbird", was co-written and first recorded by Elton John in 1976 album, Blue Moves. "Victim or a Fool" was originally recorded by the songwriter, Rodney Crowell on his 1981 eponymous album.

"Take Me Home" was originally sung by Gayle on a Tom Waits composed 1982 soundtrack album called One from the Heart for a movie of the same name. The version on this album is a re-recorded longer version.

== Track listing ==
No.	Title	Writer(s)	Length
1.	"The Sound of Goodbye"	Hugh Prestwood	3:12
2.	"I Don't Wanna Lose Your Love"	Joey Carbone	3:15
3.	"Me Against the Night"	Pam Rose, Mary Ann Kennedy, Pat Bunch	2:49
4.	"Cage the Songbird"	Elton John, Bernie Taupin, Davey Johnstone	4:09
5.	"Turning Away"	Tim Krekel	2:55
6.	"Come Back (When You Can Stay Forever)"	Chris Waters, Bucky Jones, Tom Shapiro	2:55
7.	"Victim or a Fool"	Rodney Crowell	2:35
8.	"You Made a Fool Of Me"	Melissa Cordell, Eric Borenstein	3:30
9.	"On Our Way to Love"	Norman Sallitt	3:21
10.	"Take Me Home"	Tom Waits	2:35

== Personnel ==
- Crystal Gayle – lead vocals, harmony vocals (7)
- Charles Cochran – electric piano (1, 2, 4, 7, 9), grand piano (3, 6, 9)
- John Barlow Jarvis – grand piano (1, 2, 4, 5, 7, 9, 10), electric piano (3, 6, 7)
- Alan Steinberger – synthesizers (1)
- Bobby Wood – organ (3, 5)
- Billy Joe Walker Jr. – electric guitars (1–5, 8, 9), electric lead guitar (6, 7)
- Reggie Young – electric guitars (1–9)
- Chris Leuzinger – acoustic guitars (2, 3, 6–9)
- David Hungate – bass guitar (1–9)
- Matt Betton – drums (1–9)
- Jim Horn – piccolo flute (1), saxophone (2, 5, 6, 7), flute (4, 8, 9),recorder (4)
- Larry Muhoberac – string arrangements (1–4, 6–10), string conductor (1–4, 7, 9, 10)
- Billy Strange – string conductor (6, 8)
- The Sid Sharp Strings – strings (1–4, 7, 9, 10)
- Nashville String Machine – strings (6, 8)
- Ava Aldridge – harmony vocals (1, 5, 6, 9)
- Cindy Richardson – harmony vocals (1, 3–7, 9)

=== Production ===
- Crystal Gayle – album direction
- Jimmy Bowen – producer, recording
- Lee Herschberg – engineer
- Steve Tillisch – engineer
- Ron Treat – engineer
- Paul Brown – second engineer
- J.T. Cantwell – second engineer
- Mark Coddington – second engineer
- Vicki Hicks – second engineer
- David Hassinger – remix engineer
- Glenn Meadows – mastering at Masterfonics (Nashville, Tennessee)
- Simon Levy – art direction
- Laura LiPuma – design
- Harry Langdon – photography

== Chart performance ==
Chart (1983)	Peak position
U.S. Billboard Top Country Albums	5
U.S. Billboard 200	171
