= Gary Morris discography =

- Studio albums: 14
- Live albums: 3
- Compilation albums: 3
- Singles: 34
- Music videos: 6

Gary Morris is an American country music artist. His discography consists of 14 studio albums, three compilation albums, three live albums, 34 singles, and six music videos. Of his singles, 27 charted on the U.S. Billboard Hot Country Songs charts between 1980 and 1991, including five number one hits.

== Albums ==
=== Studio albums ===
Title	Details	Peak positions			Certifications
Title	Details	US Country	US	CAN Country	Certifications
Gary Morris	Release date: March 15, 1982; Label: Warner Bros. Records	39	—	—	
Why Lady Why	Release date: August 17, 1983; Label: Warner Bros. Records	6	174	—	US: Gold
Faded Blue	Release date: April 2, 1984; Label: Warner Bros. Records	12	—	—	
Anything Goes	Release date: July 15, 1985; Label: Warner Bros. Records	1	—	—	
Plain Brown Wrapper	Release date: August 18, 1986; Label: Warner Bros. Records	9	—	—	
What If We Fall in Love? (with Crystal Gayle)	Release date: July 14, 1987; Label: Warner Bros. Records	25	—	—	
Every Christmas	Release date: September 6, 1988; Label: Warner Bros. Records	56	—	—	
Stones	Release date: May 1, 1989; Label: Universal Records	40	—	33	
These Days	Release date: October 2, 1990; Label: Capitol Nashville	—	—	—	
Full Moon, Empty Heart	Release date: September 10, 1991; Label: Capitol Nashville	—	—	—	
My Son, Your Christmas	Release date: November 15, 1998; Label: In-House Records	—	—	—	
Lone Star Knight	Release date: September 1, 2001; Label: In-House Records	—	—	—	
I Believe	Release date: July 17, 2008; Label: CD Baby	—	—	—	
Single Man	Release date: May 10, 2013; Label: Spirit Records	—	—	—	
"—" denotes releases that did not chart

=== Compilation albums ===
Title	Details	Peak positions
Title	Details	US Country
Hits	Release date: October 22, 1987; Label: Warner Bros. Records	24
Greatest Hits Volume II	Release date: August 21, 1990; Label: Warner Bros. Records	—
All-Time Greatest Hits	Release date: October 13, 2003; Label: Rhino Flashback	—
"—" denotes releases that did not chart

=== Live albums ===
Title	Details
Gary Morris Live	Release date: 1995; Label: In-House Records
Live at Tretyakov Gallery	Release date: 1999; Label: In-House Records
One Voice, One Guitar, One Night	Release date: 2003; Label: In-House Records

== Singles ==
=== As lead artist ===
Year	Title	Peak positions		Album
Year	Title	US Country	CAN Country	Album
1980	"Sweet Red Wine"	40	—	Gary Morris
1981	"Fire in Your Eyes"	40	—	Non-album single
1981	"Headed for a Heartache"	8	22	Gary Morris
1982	"Don't Look Back"	12	35	Gary Morris
1982	"Dreams Die Hard"	15	—	Gary Morris
1982	"Velvet Chains"	9	31	Why Lady Why
1983	"The Love She Found in Me"	5	27	Why Lady Why
1983	"The Wind Beneath My Wings"	4	10	Why Lady Why
1983	"Why Lady Why"	4	6	Why Lady Why
1984	"Between Two Fires"	7	10	Faded Blue
1984	"Second Hand Heart"	7	6	Faded Blue
1984	"Baby Bye Bye"	1	1	Faded Blue
1985	"Lasso the Moon"	9	8	Rustlers' Rhapsody (soundtrack)
1985	"I'll Never Stop Loving You"	1	1	Anything Goes
1985	"Makin' Up for Lost Time (The Dallas Lovers' Song)" (Note: "Makin' Up for Lost Time (The Dallas Lovers' Song)" also peaked at number 36 on the U.S. Billboard Adult Contemporary chart.) (with Crystal Gayle)	1	1	Dallas: The Music Story
1985	"Wildflower" (Note: "Wildflower" also peaked at number 21 on the Canadian RPM Adult Contemporary chart.)	—	54	Anything Goes
1986	"100% Chance of Rain"	1	1	Anything Goes
1986	"Anything Goes"	28	52	Anything Goes
1986	"Honeycomb"	27	47	Plain Brown Wrapper
1986	"Leave Me Lonely"	1	1	Plain Brown Wrapper
1987	"Plain Brown Wrapper"	9	9	Plain Brown Wrapper
1987	"Another World" (with Crystal Gayle)	4	—	What If We Fall in Love?
1987	"Simply Meant to Be" (with Jennifer Warnes)	—	—	Blind Date (soundtrack)
1987	"Finishing Touches"	64	47	Hits
1988	"All of This and More" (with Crystal Gayle)	26	—	What If We Fall in Love?
1989	"Never Had a Love Song"	48	55	Stones
1989	"The Jaws of Modern Romance"	60	—	Stones
1990	"So Little Love in the World"	—	53	Stones
1990	"Workin' Man Blues"	—	—	These Days
1991	"Miles Across the Bedroom"	47	37	These Days
1991	"Full Moon on an Empty Heart"	—	—	Full Moon, Empty Heart
1991	"One Fall Is All It Takes"	—	—	Full Moon, Empty Heart
1992	"Love Hurts"	—	—	Non-album single
"—" denotes releases that did not chart

=== As featured artist ===
Year	Title	Peak positions	Album
Year	Title	US Country	Album
1983	"You're Welcome to Tonight" (Lynn Anderson with Gary Morris)	9	Back

== Music videos ==
Year	Title
1984	"Second Hand Heart"
1985	"Lasso the Moon"
1986	"100% Chance of Rain"
1991	"Miles Across The Bedroom"
1991	"One Fall Is All It Takes"
1992	"Love Hurts"
