= Hits (Gary Morris album) =

Greatest hits album by Gary Morris
- Released: October 22, 1987
- Genre: Country
- Length: 46:07
- Label: Warner Bros.
- Producer: Bob Montgomery; Gary Morris; Jim Ed Norman; Jimmy Bowen; Marshall Morgan; Paul Worley; Steve Dorff

Gary Morris chronology
| What If We Fall in Love? (1987) | Hits (1987) | Every Christmas (1988) |

Hits is the first compilation album by American country music artist Gary Morris. It was released in October 1987 via Warner Bros. Records.

== Track listing ==
| No. | Title | Writer(s) | Length |
|---|---|---|---|
| 1. | "That's Way It Is" | Gary Morris, Eddie Setser | 3:58 |
| 2. | "Velvet Chains" | Kevin Welch, Ron Hellard | 2:24 |
| 3. | "Headed for a Heartache" | Kent Blazy, James Dowell | 3:14 |
| 4. | "100% Chance of Rain" | Charlie Black, Austin Roberts | 3:42 |
| 5. | "Baby Bye Bye" | Morris, Jamie Brantley | 3:19 |
| 6. | "Finishing Touches" | Morris | 5:30 |
| 7. | "I'll Never Stop Loving You" | Dave Loggins, J. D. Martin | 3:39 |
| 8. | "The Love She Found in Me" | Dennis Linde, Bob Morrison | 3:33 |
| 9. | "The Wind Beneath My Wings" | Jeff Silbar, Larry Henley | 4:41 |
| 10. | "Leave Me Lonely" | Morris | 3:50 |
| 11. | "Lasso the Moon" | Steve Dorff, Milton Brown | 3:28 |
| 12. | "Your Little Hand (Aria from "La boheme")" | Giacomo Puccini | 4:49 |

== Chart performance ==
| Chart (1987) | Peak position |
|---|---|
| US Top Country Albums (Billboard) | 24 |
