= 20th Academy of Country Music Awards =

US music awards ceremony in 1985

- Date: May 6, 1985
- Location: Knott's Berry Farm, Buena Park, California
- Hosted by: Glen Campbell; Janie Fricke; Loretta Lynn

Highlights
- Most wins: Alabama (3)
- Most nominations: Alabama (5)

Television/radio coverage
- Network: NBC

The 20th Academy of Country Music Awards ceremony was held on May 6, 1985, at Knott's Berry Farm, Buena Park, California. It was hosted by Glen Campbell, Janie Fricke and Loretta Lynn.

== Winners and nominees ==
Winners are shown in bold.

Entertainer of the Year	Album of the Year
**Alabama**; Willie Nelson; Oak Ridge Boys; Ricky Skaggs; Hank Williams Jr.	**Roll On — Alabama**; Don't Cheat in Our Hometown — Ricky Skaggs; Don't Make It Easy for Me — Earl Thomas Conley; Man of Steel — Hank Williams Jr.; Right or Wrong — George Strait
Top Female Vocalist of the Year	Top Male Vocalist of the Year
**Reba McEntire**; Janie Fricke; Emmylou Harris; Anne Murray; Dolly Parton	**George Strait**; Lee Greenwood; Gary Morris; Kenny Rogers; Ricky Skaggs
Top Vocal Group of the Year	Top Vocal Duo of the Year
**Alabama**; Exile; Nitty Gritty Dirt Band; Oak Ridge Boys; Statler Brothers	**The Judds**; David Frizzell and Shelly West; Lee Greenwood and Barbara Mandrell; Anne Murray and Dave Loggins; Willie Nelson and Julio Iglesias
Single Record of the Year	Song of the Year
**"To All the Girls I've Loved Before"** — **Willie Nelson** **and** **Julio Iglesias**; "I Don't Know a Thing About Love" — Conway Twitty; "I've Been Around Enough to Know" — John Schneider; "When We Make Love" — Alabama; "Why Not Me" — The Judds	**"Why Not Me"** — **Harlan Howard, Brent Maher, Sonny Throckmorton**; "I've Been Around Enough to Know" — Bob McDill, Dickey Lee; "Second Hand Heart" — Mark Gray, Harold Tipton, Craig Karp; "To All the Girls I've Loved Before" — Albert Hammond, Hal David; "When We Make Love" — Troy Seals, Mentor Williams
Top New Male Vocalist	Top New Female Vocalist
**Vince Gill**; Lloyd David Foster; Bill Medley; Dan Seals; Keith Stegall	**Nicolette Larson**; Becky Hobbs; Hilary Kanter; Katy Moffatt; Karen Taylor-Good
Video of the Year	Tex Ritter Award
**"All My Rowdy Friends Are Coming Over Tonight"** — **Hank Williams Jr.**; "America" — Waylon Jennings; "Left Side of the Bed" — Mark Gray; "Mama He's Crazy" — The Judds; "Second Hand Heart" — Gary Morris; "What She Wants" — Michael Martin Murphy	**Songwriter**; The Baron and the Kid; The Bear; Rhinestone; The River Rat
Pioneer Award
**Roy Acuff**

== Performers ==
Performer(s)	Song(s)
Exile	"Take Me to the Party"
The Judds	"Girls Night Out"
Lloyd David Foster; Bill Medley; Vince Gill; Dan Seals; Keith Stegall	Top New Male Vocalist Medley "I Can Feel the Fire Goin' Out" "Women in Love" "True Love" "My Old Yellow Car" "California"
Loretta Lynn	"Coal Miner's Daughter"
Ronnie Milsap	"She Keeps the Home Fires Burning"
Hank Williams Jr.	"I'm for Love"
Alabama	"40 Hour Week (For a Livin')"
Janie Fricke	"Somebody Else's Fire"
Glen Campbell	20th Anniversary Country Medley "King of the Road" "Gentle on My Mind" "Okie From Muskogee" "Rhinestone Cowboy" "Lucille" "All the Gold in California" "Always on My Mind" "Wind Beneath My Wings"
Karen Taylor-Good; Becky Hobbs; Katy Moffatt; Hilary Kanter; Nicolette Larson	Top New Female Vocalist Medley "Starlite" "Hottest Ex in Texas" "This Ain't Tennessee And He Ain't You" "We Work" "When You Get a Little Lonely"
Gary Morris	"Anything Goes"

== Presenters ==
Presenter(s)	Notes
Roy Clark; Morgan Brittany; Mel Tillis	Top Vocal Duo of the Year
Mr. T	Reads the Rules of the ACM Awards
Catherine Bach; Jim Stafford	Video of the Year
Marie Osmond; Sylvia	Top New Male Vocalist
Jameson Parker; Shelly West; Charley Pride	Top Vocal Group of the Year
John Ritter; Tom Ritter	Tex Ritter Award
Victor French; Reba McEntire; Mark Gray	Album of the Year
Earl Thomas Conley; T.G. Sheppard; Heather Thomas	Song of the Year
Lee Greenwood; Lee Horsley	Top Female Vocalist of the Year
Joan Van Ark; Lynn Anderson	Top Male Vocalist of the Year
Nitty Gritty Dirt Band; Juice Newton	Top New Female Vocalist
Minnie Pearl; Charlie Daniels	Presented Pioneer Award to Roy Acuff
Jennifer O'Neill; Patrick Duffy	Single Record of the Year
Eddie Dean; Roger Miller	Entertainer of the Year
