= 22nd Academy of Country Music Awards =

US music awards ceremony in 1987

- Date: April 6, 1987
- Location: Knott's Berry Farm, Buena Park, California
- Hosted by: The Judds; Patrick Duffy

Highlights
- Most wins: Randy Travis (4)
- Most nominations: Reba McEntire (5)

Television/radio coverage
- Network: NBC

The 22nd Academy of Country Music Awards ceremony was held on April 6, 1987, at Knott's Berry Farm, Buena Park, California. It was hosted by The Judds and Patrick Duffy.

== Winners and nominees ==
Winners are shown in bold.

Entertainer of the Year	Album of the Year
**Hank Williams Jr.**; Alabama; Reba McEntire; Ricky Skaggs; George Strait	**Storms of Life** — **Randy Travis**; #7 — George Strait; Guitars, Cadillacs, Etc., Etc. — Dwight Yoakam; Live in London — Ricky Skaggs; Rockin' with the Rhythm — The Judds
Top Female Vocalist of the Year	Top Male Vocalist of the Year
**Reba McEntire**; Janie Fricke; Crystal Gayle; Juice Newton; Marie Osmond	**Randy Travis**; Earl Thomas Conley; George Jones; George Strait; Hank Williams Jr.
Top Vocal Group of the Year	Top Vocal Duo of the Year
**Forester Sisters**; Alabama; Larry Gatlin & the Gatlin Brothers; Restless Heart; The Statler Brothers	**The Judds**; Bellamy Brothers; Crystal Gayle and Gary Morris; Marie Osmond and Paul Davis; Sweethearts of the Rodeo
Single Record of the Year	Song of the Year
**"On the Other Hand"** — **Randy Travis**; "Always Have, Always Will" — Janie Fricke; "Rockin' with the Rhythm of the Rain" — The Judds; "Touch Me When We're Dancing" — Alabama; "Whoever's in New England" — Reba McEntire	**"On the Other Hand"** — **Paul Overstreet, Don Schlitz**; "Everything That Glitters (Is Not Gold)" — Bob McDill, Dan Seals; "Grandpa (Tell Me 'Bout the Good Old Days)" — Jamie O'Hara; "Living in the Promiseland" — David Lynn Jones; "Whoever's in New England" — Kendal Franceschi, Quentin Powers
Top New Male Vocalist	Top New Female Vocalist
**Dwight Yoakam**; Steve Earle; Michael Johnson; Lewis Storey; Tom Wopat	**Holly Dunn**; Darlene Austin; Lisa Childress; Rosie Flores; Pam Tillis
Video of the Year
**"Whoever's in New England"** — **Reba McEntire**; "100% Chance of Rain" — Gary Morris; "Birth of Rock and Roll" — Carl Perkins; "Born Yesterday" — The Everly Brothers; "I Only Wanted You" — Marie Osmond
Pioneer Award
**Minnie Pearl**
Career Achievement Award
**Carl Perkins**

== Performers ==
Performer(s)	Song(s)
Earl Thomas Conley; Restless Heart; Janie Fricke; Mickey Gilley; Lacy J. Dalton; Patrick Duffy; The Judds	Western Medley "Back in the Saddle Again" "Cool Water" "I Fall to Pieces" "The Ballad of High Noon" "Don't Fence Me In" "Your Cheatin' Heart" "Coal Miner's Daughter" "Tumbling Tumbleweeds" "Oh My Darling, Clementine" "On the Road Again" "I'm an Old Cowhand (From the Rio Grande)"
George Strait	"All My Exes Live in Texas"
Pam Tillis; Holly Dunn; Darlene Austin; Lisa Childress; Rosie Flores	Top New Female Vocalist Medley "Runaway Train of Love" "Daddy's Hands" "Holding On" "This Time It's You" "Lovin' in Vain"
Ricky Skaggs	"Country Boy"
Randy Travis	"Forever and Ever, Amen"
Alabama	"You've Got the Touch"
Marie Osmond	"Everybody's Crazy 'Bout My Baby"
Crystal Gayle; Gary Morris	"Another World"
Tom Wopat; Michael Johnson; Lewis Storey; Dwight Yoakam	Top New Male Vocalist Medley "The Rock and Roll of Love" "Give Me Wings" "Ain't No Tellin'" "Guitars, Cadillacs"
Reba McEntire	"Sweet Dreams"
The Judds	"I Know Where I'm Going"

== Presenters ==
Presenter(s)	Notes
Bruce Boxleitner; Tammy Wynette	Top Vocal Duo of the Year
Lee Greenwood; Delta Burke	Video of the Year
Eddy Raven; Deidre Hall	Top Male Vocalist of the Year
Bellamy Brothers; Judy Rodman	Top New Female Vocalist
Sweethearts of the Rodeo; William Shatner	Top Vocal Group of the Year
Dick Clark	Presented Career Achievement Award to Carl Perkins
T.G. Sheppard; Mary Hart	Album of the Year
Juice Newton; Charley Pride	Song of the Year
Forester Sisters; Steve Wariner	Top New Male Vocalist
Mel Tillis; Janie Fricke; Ricky Skaggs	Presented Pioneer Award to Minnie Pearl
Michael Beck; Mickey Gilley	Top Female Vocalist of the Year
Earl Thomas Conley; Sylvia	Single Record of the Year
The Judds; Patrick Duffy	Entertainer of the Year
