= 19th Academy of Country Music Awards =

US music awards ceremony in 1984

- Date: May 14, 1984
- Location: Knott's Berry Farm, Buena Park, California
- Hosted by: Mac Davis; Crystal Gayle; Charley Pride

Highlights
- Most wins: Alabama (3)
- Most nominations: Merle Haggard (6)

Television/radio coverage
- Network: NBC

The 19th Academy of Country Music Awards ceremony was held on May 14, 1984, at Knott's Berry Farm, Buena Park, California. It was hosted by Mac Davis, Crystal Gayle and Charley Pride.

== Winners and nominees ==
Winners are shown in bold.

Entertainer of the Year	Album of the Year
**Alabama**; Barbara Mandrell; Willie Nelson; Oak Ridge Boys; Hank Williams Jr.	**The Closer You Get... — Alabama**; Going Where the Lonely Go — Merle Haggard; Highways & Heartaches — Ricky Skaggs; Pancho & Lefty — Willie Nelson and Merle Haggard; Wild & Blue — John Anderson
Top Female Vocalist of the Year	Top Male Vocalist of the Year
**Janie Fricke**; Crystal Gayle; Barbara Mandrell; Reba McEntire; Sylvia	**Lee Greenwood**; John Anderson; Earl Thomas Conley; Merle Haggard; Ricky Skaggs
Top Vocal Group of the Year	Top Vocal Duo of the Year
**Alabama**; Exile; Larry Gatlin & the Gatlin Brothers; Oak Ridge Boys; The Whites	**Kenny Rogers** **and** **Dolly Parton**; The Bellamy Brothers; Mickey Gilley and Charly McClain; Willie Nelson and Merle Haggard; T.G. Sheppard and Karen Brooks
Single Record of the Year	Song of the Year
**"Islands in the Stream"** — **Kenny Rogers** **and** **Dolly Parton**; "José Cuervo" — Shelly West; "A Little Good News" — Anne Murray; "Pancho and Lefty" — Willie Nelson and Merle Haggard; "Swingin'" — John Anderson	**"Wind Beneath My Wings"** — **Larry Henley, Jeff Silbar**; "I Always Get Lucky with You" — Merle Haggard, Freddy Powers, Gary Church, Tex Whitson; "I.O.U." — Austin Roberts, Kerry Chater; "Lady Down on Love" — Randy Owen; "Swingin'" — John Anderson, Lionel Delmore
Top New Male Vocalist	Top New Female Vocalist
**Jim Glaser**; Darrell Clanton; Craig Dillingham; Mark Gray; Wayne Massey	**Gus Hardin**; Lane Brody; Amy Grant; Kathy Mattea; Lorrie Morgan
Pioneer Award
**Eddy Arnold**

== Performers ==
Performer(s)	Song(s)
Danny Cooksey; La-Konya Smithee	"The South's Gonna Do It Again"
Ronnie Milsap	"Prisoner of the Highway"
Darrell Clanton; Craig Dillingham; Jim Glaser; Mark Gray; Wayne Massey	Top New Male Vocalist Medley "Lonesome 7-7203" "Honky Tonk Women Make Honky Tonk Men" "If I Could Only Dance with You" "Left Side of the Bed" "With Love on Our Side"
Crystal Gayle	"Turning Away"
Ray Charles; George Jones	"We Didn't See a Thing"
Glen Campbell	Elvis Presley Medley "(Let Me Be Your) Teddy Bear" "I Want You, I Need You, I Love You" "Don't Be Cruel"
Alabama	"When We Make Love"
Rebecca Holden; George Jones; Tom Wopat; John Anderson; Gary Morris	Song of the Year Medley "I.O.U." "I Always Get Lucky with You" "Lady Down on Love" "Swingin'" "Wind Beneath My Wings"
Janie Fricke	"If the Fall Don't Get You"
Gus Hardin; Kathy Mattea; Lorrie Morgan; Lane Brody	Top New Female Vocalist Medley "How Are You Spending My Nights" "Street Talk" "Don't Go Changing" "Over You"
Charley Pride	"The Power of Love"
Mac Davis	"Caroline's Still in Georgia"

== Presenters ==
Presenter(s)	Notes
Mr. T	Reads the Rules of the ACM Awards
Catherine Bach; Charly McClain	Top Vocal Group of the Year
T.G. Sheppard; Engelbert Humperdinck	Top Female Vocalist of the Year
Marie Osmond; Shelly West	Top New Male Vocalist
Deborah Allen; Mick Fleetwood	Top Vocal Duo of the Year
Linda Blair; B. J. Thomas	Album of the Year
Tammy Wynette; George Peppard	Song of the Year
Betty Buckley; Sylvia	Top Male Vocalist of the Year
Michael Martin Murphy; Johnny Lee	Top New Female Vocalist
Patti Page	Presented Pioneer Award to Eddy Arnold
Bellamy Brothers; Ann Jillian	Single Record of the Year
James Brolin; Kay Starr	Entertainer of the Year
