= Anything Goes (disambiguation) =

Anything Goes is a musical by Cole Porter.

Anything Goes may also refer to:

== Related to the musical ==
- "Anything Goes" (Cole Porter song), the title song of the musical (and of several of the albums listed below)
- Anything Goes (1936 film), an adaptation directed by Lewis Milestone
- Anything Goes (1956 film), an adaptation directed by Robert Lewis
- Anything Goes (1989 cast album)
- Anything Goes (1989 London Cast Recording), an album

== Albums ==
- Anything Goes (soundtrack), by Bing Crosby, from the 1956 film
- Anything Goes (Bing Crosby album), 1962
- Anything Goes (Brad Mehldau album), 2004
- Anything Goes! (C+C Music Factory album), 1994
- Anything Goes (Florida Georgia Line album), 2014
- Anything Goes (Gary Morris album), 1985
- Anything Goes (Harpers Bizarre album), 1967
- Anything Goes (Herb Alpert album), 2009
- Anything Goes (Randy Houser album), or the title song (see below), 2008
- Anything Goes (Ron Carter album), 1975
- Anything Goes: Stephane Grappelli & Yo-Yo Ma Play (Mostly) Cole Porter, 1989
- Anything Goes! The Dave Brubeck Quartet Plays Cole Porter, 1967

== Songs ==
- "Anything Goes", a song in a 1974 episode of the TV series Monty Python's Flying Circus
- "Anything Goes" (Gary Morris song), 1986
- "Anything Goes" (Gregg Allman song), 1987
- "Anything Goes", song by Guns N' Roses from Appetite for Destruction, 1987
- "Anything Goes" (Ras Kass song), 1996
- "Anything Goes" (Randy Houser song), 2008
- "Anything Goes" (AC/DC song), 2009
- "Anything Goes!" (Maki Ohguro song), 2010
- "Anything Goes" (Florida Georgia Line song), 2015

== Literature ==
- Anything Goes: Origins of the Cult of Scientific Irrationalism or Popper and After, a 1982 book by David Stove
- Anything Goes! (comics), a 1980s anthology that included an appearance of the Flaming Carrot
- Anything Goes, a 2008 autobiography by John Barrowman
- Anything Goes: A Biography of the Roaring Twenties, a 2008 book by Lucy Moore

== Television ==
- Anything Goes (Australian TV series), a 1957 variety series that aired in Melbourne
- Anything Goes, a 1968 Australian variety show featuring Bryan Davies
- Anything Goes (Irish TV series), an Irish children's show on RTE, 1980–1986

== Other uses ==
- Anything Goes theorem or Sonnenschein-Mantel-Debreu Theorem, a result in equilibrium economics
