= The Best of Crystal Gayle =

Compilation album by Crystal Gayle
- Released: August 1987
- Recorded: 1982–1986
- Genre: Country; country pop
- Length: 34:50
- Label: Warner Bros. Nashville
- Producer: Jimmy Bowen; Michael Masser; Jim Ed Norman; Allen Reynolds

Crystal Gayle chronology
| What If We Fall in Love? (1986) | The Best of Crystal Gayle (1987) | Nobody's Angel (1988) |

Singles from The Best of Crystal Gayle
- 1. "Only Love Can Save Me Now" Released: October 24, 1987

The Best of Crystal Gayle is a compilation album by American country music artist Crystal Gayle. It was released in August 1987 on Warner Bros. Records. The album contained Gayle's major hit singles while recording for the latter label between 1982 and 1986. She would depart from Warner Bros. the following year.

== Background and reception ==
The Best of Crystal Gayle consists of ten tracks, all of which had been previously recorded and been issued on Gayle's albums for the Warner Bros. label. According to Allmusic, the album contained many of her major hits with the record company including, "'Til I Gain Control Again", "Turning Away", and "Straight to the Heart". The album was originally released in several different formats. It was first issued as a Vinyl LP, followed by an audio cassette and then a compact disc. The Best of Crystal Gayle was released in the United States, Canada, Germany, and Japan.

The Best of Crystal Gayle was officially issued in August 1987 on Warner Bros. Records. The record reached the fifty third position on the Billboard Top Country Albums on the chart issued for August 13. The album spawned one single in late 1987 entitled "Only Love Can Save Me Now". It originally had been recorded for Gayle's 1986 studio album Straight to the Heart. The single peaked at number eleven on the Billboard Hot Country Singles & Tracks chart and number eighteen on the Canadian RPM Country Tracks chart.

== Track listing ==
Standard edition
| No. | Title | Writer(s) | Length |
|---|---|---|---|
| 1. | "Cry" | Churchill Kohlman | 4:16 |
| 2. | "Turning Away" | Tim Krekel | 2:54 |
| 3. | "Baby, What About You" | Josh Leo, Wendy Waldman | 2:43 |
| 4. | "Straight to the Heart" | Graham Lyle, Terry Britten | 3:58 |
| 5. | "'Til I Gain Control Again" | Rodney Crowell | 3:56 |
| 6. | "Only Love Can Save Me Now" | Tom Shapiro, Chris Waters, Bucky Jones | 3:22 |
| 7. | "A Long and Lasting Love" | Gerry Goffin, Michael Masser | 3:27 |
| 8. | "Our Love Is on the Faultline" | Reece Kirk | 3:45 |
| 9. | "I Don't Wanna Lose Your Love" | Joey Carbone | 3:16 |
| 10. | "The Sound of Goodbye" | Hugh Prestwood | 3:13 |

== Charts ==
Weekly charts

| Chart (1987) | Peak position |
|---|---|
| US Top Country Albums (Billboard) | 53 |
