= Plain Brown Wrapper =

Plain Brown Wrapper may refer to:

- "Plain Brown Wrapper" (song), a 1987 song by Gary Morris
- Plain Brown Wrapper (album), a 1986 album by Gary Morris
