= Straight to the Heart =

Straight to the Heart may refer to:

- Straight to the Heart (Crystal Gayle album), 1986
  - "Straight to the Heart" (song), the title track
- Straight to the Heart (David Sanborn album), 1984, or the title track
- Straight to the Heart (1968 film), a Canadian drama film
- Straight to the Heart (2016 film), a Filipino drama-comedy film
- Straight to the Heart (game show), a dating game show hosted by Michael Burger
- "Straight to the Heart", a song by Battle Beast from the album Bringer of Pain
- "Straight to the Heart", an episode of the TV series Grey's Anatomy
- "Straight to the Heart", an episode of the TV series Hunter

== See also ==
- "Straight to My Heart", a song by Sting from the album ...Nothing Like the Sun
- "Straight to Heart" (Code Lyoko episode)
- Straight for the Heart, a 1988 film by Léa Pool
- Straight from the Heart (disambiguation)
