= Why Lady Why (album) =

Studio album by Gary Morris
- Released: August 17, 1983
- Genre: Country
- Length: 33:32
- Label: Warner Bros.
- Producer: Bob Montgomery (tracks 1–4); Marshall Morgan (tracks 1–3, 5); Paul Worley (tracks 1–3, 5); Jimmy Bowen (tracks 6–10)

Gary Morris chronology
Gary Morris (1982)	Why Lady Why (1983)	Faded Blue (1984)

Why Lady Why is the second studio album by American country music artist Gary Morris. It was released on August 17, 1983, via Warner Bros. Records. The album includes the singles "Velvet Chains", "The Love She Found in Me", "The Wind Beneath My Wings" and "Why Lady Why", the album's title track.

== Track listing ==
No.	Title	Writer(s)	Length
1.	"The Love She Found in Me"	Dennis Linde, Bob Morrison	3:29
2.	"I Can't Feel the Fire Goin' Out"	Troy Seals, Eddie Setser	3:28
3.	"Runaway Hearts"	Gary Morris, Seals, Setser	2:32
4.	"Why Lady Why"	Morris, Setser	2:48
5.	"Velvet Chains"	Kevin Welch, Ron Hellard	2:22
6.	"I'd Be the First to Fall in Love Again"	Bill Boing, Jim Hurt	3:22
7.	"The Wind Beneath My Wings"	Jeff Silbar, Larry Henley	4:40
8.	"The Way I Love You Tonight"	Morris, Setser	3:22
9.	"Again"	Mark Gray	3:18
10.	"Mama You Can't Give Me No Whippin'"	Dave Loggins	3:13

== Personnel ==
Adapted from liner notes.

- Acoustic Guitar: Dann Huff, Gary Morris, Brent Rowan, Billy Joe Walker Jr. Paul Worley, Reggie Young
- Electric Guitar: Jamie Brantley, Bruce Dees, Kenny Mims, Gary Hooker, Billy Joe Walker Jr., Reggie Young
- Bass Guitar: Steve Brantley, David Hungate, Joe Osborn, Bob Wray
- Steel Guitar: John Macy, Sonny Garrish
- Drums: Eddie Bayers, Matt Betton, Merel Bregante, James Stroud
- Keyboards: Mitch Humphries, John Barlow Jarvis, Ron Oates
- Fiddle: Hoot Hester
- Lead Vocals: Gary Morris
- Background Vocals: Jamie Brantley, Steve Brantley, Thom Flora, Gary Hooker, Gary Janney, Gary Morris, Gary Pigg, Mark Wright

Strings performed by The Nashville String Machine, arranged by Ron Oates and Al De Lory.

== Chart performance ==
Chart (1983)	Peak position
US Top Country Albums (Billboard)	6
