= I'll Never Stop Loving You =

I'll Never Stop Loving You may refer to:

- "I'll Never Stop Loving You" (1955 song), sung by Doris Day
- "I'll Never Stop Loving You" (Gary Morris song), a 1985 country song
