= Why Lady Why =

Why Lady Why may refer to:

== Music ==
- "Why Lady Why" (Alabama song), a 1980 song by Alabama
- "Why Lady Why" (Gary Morris song), a 1984 song by Gary Morris
