= Faded Blue =

Studio album by Gary Morris
- Released: April 2, 1984
- Genre: Country
- Length: 37:38
- Label: Warner Bros.
- Producer: Gary Morris, Jim Ed Norman

Gary Morris chronology
Why Lady Why (1983)	Faded Blue (1984)	Anything Goes (1985)

Faded Blue is the third studio album by American country music artist Gary Morris. It was released on April 2, 1984 via Warner Bros. Records. The album includes the singles "Between Two Fires", "Second Hand Heart" and "Baby Bye Bye".

== Track listing ==
No.	Title	Writer(s)	Length
1.	"Baby Bye Bye"	Gary Morris, Jamie Brantley	3:18
2.	"Roll Back the Rug and Dance"	John Barlow Jarvis, Don Cook, Gary Nicholson	3:08
3.	"Second Hand Heart"	Mark Gray, Harold Tipton, Craig Karp	4:10
4.	"Between Two Fires"	Jan Buckingham, Sam Lorber, J. D. Martin	4:02
5.	"Whoever's Watchin'"	Morris, Kevin Welch	2:48
6.	"All She Said Was No"	Morris, Eddie Setser	3:06
7.	"Miracle"	Mac McAnally	4:00
8.	"West Texas Highway and Me"	Morris, Setser	3:02
9.	"Bed of Roses"	Morris, Setser	6:26
10.	"Faded Blue"	Brian Neary, Jim Photoglo	3:38

== Personnel ==
Adapted from liner notes.

- Eddie Bayers - drums, percussion
- Jamie Brantley - acoustic guitar, electric guitar, background vocals
- Steve Brantley - bass guitar, background vocals
- Sonny Garrish - steel guitar
- Steve Gibson - electric guitar (tracks 2, 6)
- Gary Hooker - acoustic guitar, electric guitar, background vocals
- John Barlow Jarvis - electric piano, piano
- Gary Morris - lead vocals, background vocals
- Bobby Ogdin - organ

Strings arranged and conducted by Bergen White, performed by The Nashville String Machine with Carl Gorodetzky, concertmaster.

== Chart performance ==
Chart (1984)	Peak position
US Top Country Albums (Billboard)	12
