= The Promiseland =

Studio album by Willie Nelson
- Released: 1986
- Genre: Country
- Length: 33:56
- Label: Columbia
- Producer: Willie Nelson

Willie Nelson chronology
Me & Paul (1985)	The Promiseland (1986)	Partners (1986)

Singles from The Promiseland
- 1. "Living in the Promiseland" Released: February 1986; 2. "I'm Not Trying to Forget You" Released: July 1986

The Promiseland is the thirty-fourth studio album by American country music singer Willie Nelson. It reached No. 1 on the US Country Albums chart. He was backed by Clint Strong (guitar), Mark Yeary (keyboards), Dennis Hromek (bass), Biff Adam (drums), and Jimmy Belken (fiddle) of The Strangers.

Professional ratings
Review scores
Source	Rating
Allmusic	link

== Track listing ==
No.	Title	Writer(s)	Length
1.	"Living in the Promiseland"	David Lynn Jones	3:18
2.	"I'm Not Trying to Forget You"	Willie Nelson	3:17
3.	"Here in My Heart"	Jones	3:50
4.	"I've Got the Craziest Feeling"	Floyd Tillman	2:54
5.	"No Place But Texas"	Alex Harvey	3:22
6.	"You're Only in My Arms (To Cry on My Shoulder)"	Steve Nelson	3:16
7.	"Pass It On"	Steve Bivens, Dub Dickerson, Clarence Williams	3:10
8.	"Do You Ever Think of Me"	Earl Burtnett, John Cooper, Harry D. Kerr	2:17
9.	"Old Fashioned Love"	James P. Johnson, Cecil	2:47
10.	"Basin Street Blues"	Spencer Williams	4:09
11.	"Bach Minuet in G"	Johann Sebastian Bach	1:36

== Personnel ==
- Willie Nelson - guitar, arranger, vocals

The Strangers:

- Biff Adam - drums
- Jimmy Belken - fiddle
- Dennis Hromek - bass guitar
- Clint Strong - guitar
- Mark Yeary - keyboards

and

- Ritchie Albright - drums
- Johnny Gimble - fiddle
- Mickey Raphael - harmonica
- Bee Spears - bass guitar
- Bobby Arnold - engineer
- Paul Buskirk - guitar
- Bill Ginn - keyboards
- Larry Greenhill - engineer
- David Lynn Jones - guitar
- John Moran - assistant engineer
- Freddy Powers - guitar
- Denny Purcell - mastering
- Dean Reynolds - double bass
- Randee Saint Nicholas - photography
- Spencer Starnes - bass guitar
- Virginia Team - art direction

== Chart performance ==
Chart (1986)	Peak position
U.S. Billboard Top Country Albums	1
