= Academy of Country Music Award for New Male Artist of the Year =

Annual US country music award

- Country: United States
- Presented by: Academy of Country Music
- First award: 1966
- Currently held by: Tucker Wetmore (61st)

The Academy of Country Music Award for New Male Artist of the Year is one of the new artist categories presented at the Academy of Country Music Awards. This award was first awarded in 1966 to Merle Haggard, when this award was known as the Most Promising Male Vocalist.

From 1966 to 1977, this award was known as the Most Promising Male Vocalist.

From 1978 to 2008, the award was known as the Top New Male Vocalist.

And from 2016 to now, this award is now known as the New Male Artist of the Year.

This award is given to the new male artist who has gained initial fame or significantly greater recognition during the promotion of a debut or sophomore album within the eligibility period. The artist must have released a single that reached the Top 40 on Billboard's Hot Country Songs or the Mediabase Country charts. Any albums self-released through an independent label the artist owns and operates may not be counted as a debut or sophomore album, unless it produces a Top 40 single reported by Billboard's Hot Country Songs or Mediabase Country charts.The winner of this award is eligible for the Triple Crown Award, if they win a Female Artist of the Year, and Entertainer of the Year.

== Winners and nominees ==
In the following tables, the years correspond to the date of the ceremony. Artists are eligible based on their work of the previous calendar year. Entries with a blue ribbon next to the artist's name have won the award; those with a white background are the nominees on the short-list.

There was no winner for this award in 2004, 2005, and from 2010 to 2015. For the award was changed into the Academy of Country Music Award for New Artist of the Year award. The winners in 2009 and 2013 would be finalist for the New Artist of the Year.

=== 2020s ===
Year	Winner	Nominees
2026	Tucker Wetmore	Gavin Adcock; Vincent Mason; Shaboozey; Hudson Westbrook
2025	Zach Top	Gavin Adcock; Shaboozey; Tucker Wetmore; Bailey Zimmerman
2024	Nate Smith	Ernest; Kameron Marlowe; Dylan Scott; Conner Smith
2023	Zach Bryan	Jackson Dean; Ernest; Dylan Scott; Nate Smith; Bailey Zimmerman
2022	Parker McCollum	HARDY; Walker Hayes; Ryan Hurd; Elvie Shane
2021	Jimmie Allen	HARDY; Cody Johnson; Parker McCollum; Travis Denning
2020	Riley Green	Cody Johnson; Jordan Davis; Russell Dickerson; Morgan Wallen

=== 2010s ===
Year	Winner	Nominees
2019	Luke Combs	Jimmie Allen; Jordan Davis; Michael Ray; Mitchell Tenpenny
2018	Brett Young	Kane Brown; Luke Combs; Devin Dawson; Russell Dickerson
2017	Jon Pardi	Kane Brown; Chris Janson; Chris Lane; Brett Young
2016	Chris Stapleton	Brett Eldredge; Chris Janson; Thomas Rhett; Chase Rice
2013	Brantley Gilbert	Hunter Hayes; Lee Brice

=== 2000s ===
Year	Winner	Nominees
2009	Jake Owen	Jamey Johnson; James Otto
2008	Jack Ingram	Luke Bryan; Jake Owen
2007	Rodney Atkins	Craig Morgan; Chris Young
2006	Jason Aldean	Billy Currington; Craig Morgan
2003	Joe Nichols	Blake Shelton; Darryl Worley
2002	Phil Vassar	Chris Cagle; Blake Shelton
2001	Keith Urban	Billy Gilman; Phil Vassar
2000	Brad Paisley	Gary Allan; Chad Brock

=== 1990s ===
Year	Winner	Nominees
1999	Mark Wills	Deryl Dodd; David Kersh
1998	Kenny Chesney	Rhett Akins; Michael Peterson
1997	Trace Adkins	James Bonamy; Kevin Sharp
1996	Bryan White	Wade Hayes; David Lee Murphy
1995	Tim McGraw	David Ball; John Berry
1994	John Michael Montgomery	Doug Supernaw; Clay Walker
1993	Tracy Lawrence	Billy Ray Cyrus; Collin Raye
1992	Billy Dean	Mark Chesnutt; Joe Diffie
1991	Alan Jackson	Doug Stone; Travis Tritt
1990	Clint Black	Garth Brooks; Lionel Cartwright

=== 1980s ===
Year	Winner	Nominees
1989	Rodney Crowell	J.C. Crowley; Skip Ewing; David Lynn Jones; Paul Overstreet
1988	Ricky Van Shelton	Larry Boone; Marty Haggard; Lyle Lovett; Jo-El Sonnier
1987	Dwight Yoakam	Steve Earle; Michael Johnson; Lewis Storey; Tom Wopat
1986	Randy Travis	T. Graham Brown; Billy Burnette; Marty Stuart; Keith Whitley
1985	Vince Gill	Lloyd David Foster; Bill Medley; Dan Seals; Keith Stegall
1984	Jim Glaser	Darrell Clanton; Craig Dillingham; Mark Gray; Wayne Massey
1983	Michael Martin Murphy	Kieran Kane; Gary Morris; George Strait; Gary Wolf
1982	Ricky Skaggs	Earl Thomas Conley; Lee Greenwood; Eddy Raven; John Schneider
1981	Johnny Lee	Ed Bruce; Leon Everette; Don King; Steve Wariner
1980	R.C. Bannon	John Anderson; Razzy Bailey; Randy Barlow; Big Al Downing

=== 1970s ===
Year	Winner	Nominees
1979	John Conlee	Lee Dresser; Con Hunley; Ronnie McDowell; Kenny O'Dell
1978	Eddie Rabbitt	Bobby Borchers; Howdy Glenn; Vern Gosdin; Mel McDaniel
1977	Moe Bandy	Rex Allen Jr.; Billy "Crash" Craddock; Larry Gatlin; Johnny Lee
1976	Freddy Fender	Tom Bresh; T.G. Sheppard; Kenny Starr; Gene Watson
1975	Mickey Gilley	Brian Collins; Danny Michaels; Red Stegall; Billy Swan
1974	Dorsey Burnette	Larry Booth; Danny Michaels; Ronnie Milsap; Little Joe Shaver; Red Stegall
1973	Johnny Rodriguez	Larry Booth; Little Joe Shaver; Red Simpson; Red Stegall
1972	Tony Booth	Gene Davis; Mayf Nutter; Red Stegall; Bobby Wright
1971	Buddy Alan	Tony Booth; Mayf Nutter; Red Stegall; Bobby Wayne
1970	Freddy Weller	Buddy Alan; Cliff Crofford; Norm Forrest; Eddie Fukano; Mayf Nutter; Ronnie Sessions

=== 1960s ===
Year	Winner	Nominees
1969	Ray Sanders	Cliff Crofford; Glen Garrison; Norm Forrest; Eddie Fukano
1968	Jerry Inman	Cliff Crofford; Glen Garrison; Robert Mitchum; Tom Tall
1967	Billy Mize	Bobby Austin; Dick Curless; Eddy Downs; Glen Garrison; Jerry Inman; Red Simpson
1966	Merle Haggard	Buddy Cagle; Bobby Durham; Jerry Inman; Billy Mize
