= 21st Academy of Country Music Awards =

US music awards ceremony in 1986

- Date: April 14, 1986
- Location: Knott's Berry Farm, Buena Park, California
- Hosted by: Mac Davis; Reba McEntire; John Schneider

Highlights
- Most wins: Alabama; George Strait (2 each)
- Most nominations: Alabama; Hank Williams Jr. (4 each)

Television/radio coverage
- Network: NBC

The 21st Academy of Country Music Awards ceremony was held on April 14, 1986, at Knott's Berry Farm, Buena Park, California. It was hosted by Mac Davis, Reba McEntire and John Schneider.

== Winners and nominees ==
Winners are shown in bold.

Entertainer of the Year	Album of the Year
**Alabama**; Lee Greenwood; Ricky Skaggs; George Strait; Hank Williams Jr.	**Does Fort Worth Ever Cross Your Mind — George Strait**; 40-Hour Week — Alabama; Five-O — Hank Williams Jr.; Highwayman — The Highwaymen; Why Not Me — The Judds
Top Female Vocalist of the Year	Top Male Vocalist of the Year
**Reba McEntire**; Rosanne Cash; Crystal Gayle; Anne Murray; Juice Newton	**George Strait**; Earl Thomas Conley; Gary Morris; Ricky Skaggs; Hank Williams Jr.
Top Vocal Group of the Year	Top Vocal Duo of the Year
**Alabama**; Exile; Forester Sisters; Oak Ridge Boys; Sawyer Brown	**The Judds**; Bellamy Brothers; Ray Charles and Willie Nelson; Crystal Gayle and Gary Morris; Marie Osmond and Dan Seals
Single Record of the Year	Song of the Year
**"Highwayman"** — **The Highwaymen**; "Baby's Got Her Blue Jeans On" — Mel McDaniel; "Dixie Road" — Lee Greenwood; "I'm For Love" — Hank Williams Jr.; "Love Is Alive" — The Judds	**"Lost in the Fifties Tonight (In the Still of the Night)"** — **Fred Parris, Mike Reid, Troy Seals**; "Baby's Got Her Blue Jeans On" — Bob McDill; "I'll Never Stop Loving You" — Dave Loggins, J.D. Martin; "Seven Spanish Angels" — Troy Seals, Eddie Sester; "Some Fools Never Learn" — John Scott Sherrill
Top New Male Vocalist	Top New Female Vocalist
**Randy Travis**; T. Graham Brown; Billy Burnette; Marty Stuart; Keith Whitley	**Judy Rodman**; Liz Boardo; Tari Hensley; Robin Lee; Patty Loveless
Video of the Year
**"Who's Gonna Fill Their Shoes"** — **George Jones**; "40 Hour Week (For a Livin')" — Alabama; "Country Boy" — Ricky Skaggs; "Highwayman" — The Highwaymen; "Lost in the Fifties Tonight (In the Still of the Night)" — Ronnie Milsap
Tex Ritter Award
**Sweet Dreams**
Pioneer Award
**Kitty Wells**

== Performers ==
Performer(s)	Song(s)
The Oak Ridge Boys	"Juliet"
John Schneider	"You're the Last Thing I Needed Tonight"
Liz Boardo; Tari Hensley; Robin Lee; Patty Loveless; Judy Rodman	Top New Female Vocalist Medley "I Love the Way It Feels" "Oh Yes I Can" "I'll Take Your Love Anytime" "Lonely Days, Lonely Nights" "Until I Met You"
George Strait	"Nobody in His Right Mind Would've Left Her"
Reba McEntire	"Whoever's in New England"
Tom T. Hall	"Kitty Wells Started It All"
Mac Davis	"Somewhere in America"
Alabama	Hits Medley "Can't Keep a Good Man Down" "Tennessee River" "Mountain Music"
Janie Fricke; Lee Greenwood	Song of the Year Medley "I'll Never Stop Loving You" "Baby's Got Her Blue Jeans On" "Some Fools Never Learn" "Seven Spanish Angels" "Lost in the Fifties Tonight (In the Still of the Night)"
Billy Burnette; Randy Travis; Keith Whitley; T. Graham Brown; Marty Stuart	Top New Male Vocalist Medley "Try Me" "1982" "Miami, My Amy" "I Tell It Like It Used to Be" "Arlene"
The Judds	"Rockin' with the Rhythm of the Rain"
Rex Allen; Hugh O'Brien; Patti Page; Carl Perkins	History of the Grand Ole Opry

== Presenters ==
Presenter(s)	Notes
Alan Thicke; Markie Post; Bobby Bare	Top Vocal Group of the Year
Tom Ritter; John Ritter	Presents Tex Ritter Award to Sweet Dreams
Season Hubley; Sylvia	Top Male Vocalist of the Year
Johnny Lee; Eddie Rabbitt; Marie Osmond	Top New Female Vocalist
Sawyer Brown; Lacy J. Dalton	Top Vocal Duo of the Year
Tammy Wynette	Presents Pioneer Award to Kitty Wells
John Larroquette; The Forester Sisters	Album of the Year
Michael Martin Murphy; Stepfanie Kramer; Boxcar Willie	Song of the Year
Nicolette Larson; Steve Wariner; Juice Newton	Top New Male Vocalist
Ronnie Milsap; Gary Morris	Top Female Vocalist of the Year
Earl Thomas Conley; Catherine Bach; Hank Williams Jr.	Video of the Year
Exile; Barbara Stock	Single Record of the Year
Mac Davis; Reba McEntire; John Schneider	Entertainer of the Year
