= Please Be Love =

Single by Mark Gray

from the album That Feeling Inside
- B-side: "I Need You Again"
- Released: December 21, 1985
- Genre: Country
- Label: Columbia
- Songwriter(s): J.D. Martin, Jim Photoglo
- Producer(s): Steve Buckingham, Mark Gray

Mark Gray singles chronology
| "Smooth Sailing (Rock in the Road)" (1985) | "Please Be Love" (1985) | "Back When Love Was Enough" (1986) |

"Please Be Love" is a song written by J.D. Martin and Jim Photoglo, and recorded by American country music artist Mark Gray. It was released in December 1985 as the first single from his album That Feeling Inside. The song peaked at number 7 on the Billboard Hot Country Singles chart.

== Chart performance ==
| Chart (1985–1986) | Peak position |
|---|---|
| US Hot Country Songs (Billboard) | 7 |
| Canadian RPM Country Tracks | 3 |
