= Another World (Crystal Gayle and Gary Morris song) =

1987 single by Crystal Gayle and Gary Morris

Single by Crystal Gayle and Gary Morris

from the album What If We Fall in Love?
- B-side: "Makin' Up for Lost Time (The Dallas Lovers' Song)"
- Released: April 25, 1987
- Genre: Country
- Length: 3:34
- Label: Warner Bros. Nashville
- Songwriters: John Loeffler; Ralph Schuckett
- Producer: Jim Ed Norman

Crystal Gayle singles chronology
"Straight to the Heart" (1986)	"Another World" (1987)	"Nobody Should Have to Love This Way" (1987)

Gary Morris singles chronology
"Plain Brown Wrapper" (1987)	"Another World" (1987)	"All of This and More" (1988)

"Another World" (also known as "(You Take Me Away to) Another World") is a song written by John Loeffler and Ralph Schuckett, and recorded by American country music artists Crystal Gayle and Gary Morris. It was released on April 25, 1987 as the second single from the 1986 album What If We Fall in Love?. The song reached #4 on the Billboard Hot Country Singles & Tracks chart.

The single was used as the basis for the theme song of the NBC Daytime soap opera of the same name from 1987 to 1996. Crystal Gayle appeared on Another World as herself in a one-week guest arc during the week of March 23, 1987, during which she almost became a victim (in canon) of the "Sin Stalker" serial killer, a plotline that was ongoing at the time of her appearance. Gayle and Morris—appearing as special guests for the grand re-opening of TOPS, the fictional Bay City restaurant purchased by principal character Felicia Gallant (Linda Dano)—performed the song during the March 27, 1987 episode.

The serial subsequently began using an abbreviated instrumental rearrangement of the song as a placeholder theme on March 30, 1987 (replacing an orchestral composition by Jonathan L. Segal that had been in use since September 1981); a 35-second vocal version derived from that arrangement, consisting of only the main chorus, replaced it on October 26, 1987 and served as Another World's main theme until it (along with the title sequence that debuted with that version) was retired on March 1, 1996, in favor of a new industrial instrumental theme by Dominic Messinger. The full song, as heard during Gayle and Morris' 1987 guest appearance, was occasionally featured during the soap opera's closing credits from April to May 1987 (during which it was also used for sponsorship tags) and from February 1995 to March 1996.

At the 30th Annual Grammy Awards in 1988, the song received a nomination for Best Country Vocal Duet.

== Charts ==
Chart (1987)	Peak position
US Hot Country Songs (Billboard)	4
