= Bonnie Jean (Little Sister) =

Single by David Lynn Jones

from the album Hard Times on Easy Street
- B-side: "Valley of a Thousand Years"
- Released: August 1987
- Genre: Country
- Length: 3:20
- Label: Mercury
- Songwriter: David Lynn Jones
- Producers: Richie Albright, David Lynn Jones, Mick Ronson

David Lynn Jones singles chronology
"Bonnie Jean (Little Sister)" (1987)	"High Ridin' Heroes" (1988)

"Bonnie Jean (Little Sister)" is the debut single written and recorded by American country music artist David Lynn Jones. It was released in August 1987 as the first single from the album Hard Times on Easy Street. The song reached number 10 on the Billboard Hot Country Singles & Tracks chart.

== Content ==
The song is about a female truck driver, a single mother with three children to raise. (Early in the song, she was married, but he abandoned her.) The lyrics refer to struggles on the road balancing her job and being a mother, her friends made in other towns and moving ahead from hard-luck circumstances.

The song's title refers to Jones's sister.

== Critical reception ==
An uncredited review of the song in the Gavin Report said that the song was "a raunchy Country hard-luck story. But the feel is up, positive and rockin'."

== Charts ==
Chart (1987)	Peak position
Canada Country Tracks (RPM)	9
US Hot Country Songs (Billboard)	10
