= Nobody Should Have to Love This Way =

Single by Crystal Gayle

from the album Straight to the Heart
- B-side: "A Little Bit Closer"
- Released: July 18, 1987
- Genre: Country
- Length: 4:12
- Label: Warner Bros. Nashville
- Songwriter(s): Tommy Rocco, Charlie Black, Rory Bourke
- Producer(s): Jim Ed Norman

Crystal Gayle singles chronology
"Another World" (1987)	"Nobody Should Have to Love This Way" (1987)	"Only Love Can Save Me Now" (1987)

"Nobody Should Have to Love This Way" is a song recorded by American country music artist Crystal Gayle. It was released in July 1987 as the third single from the album Straight to the Heart. The song reached #26 on the Billboard Hot Country Singles & Tracks chart. The song was written by Tommy Rocco, Charlie Black and Rory Bourke.

== Chart performance ==
Chart (1987)	Peak position
US Hot Country Songs (Billboard)	26
