= Between Two Fires (song) =

Single by Gary Morris

from the album Faded Blue
- B-side: "All She Said Was No"
- Released: April 7, 1984
- Genre: Country
- Length: 4:02
- Label: Warner Bros.
- Songwriter(s): Jan Buckingham, Sam Lorber, J.D. Martin
- Producer(s): Bob Montgomery

Gary Morris singles chronology
"You're Welcome to Tonight" (1983)	"Between Two Fires" (1984)	"Second Hand Heart" (1984)

"Between Two Fires" is a song written by Jan Buckingham, Sam Lorber and J.D. Martin, and recorded by American country music artist Gary Morris. It was released in April 1984 as the first single from the album Faded Blue. The song reached #7 on the Billboard Hot Country Singles & Tracks chart.

== Chart performance ==
Chart (1984)	Peak position
US Hot Country Songs (Billboard)	7
Canadian RPM Country Tracks	10
