= Dreams Die Hard (song) =

Single by Gary Morris

from the album Gary Morris
- B-side: "Eyes of the World"
- Released: July 10, 1982
- Genre: Country
- Length: 3:19
- Label: Warner Bros.
- Songwriter(s): Chick Rains
- Producer(s): Marshall Morgan, Paul Worley, Gary Morris

Gary Morris singles chronology
"Don't Look Back" (1982)	"Dreams Die Hard" (1982)	"Velvet Chains" (1982)

"Dreams Die Hard" is a song written by Chick Rains, and recorded by American country music artist Gary Morris. It was released in July 1982 as the third single from the album Gary Morris. The song reached #15 on the Billboard Hot Country Singles & Tracks chart.

== Chart performance ==
Chart (1982)	Peak position
US Hot Country Songs (Billboard)	15
