= Straight from the Heart =

Straight from the Heart may refer to:

== Music ==
- Straight from the Heart (Patrice Rushen album), 1982
- Straight from the Heart (Peabo Bryson album), 1984
- Straight from the Heart (The Gap Band album), 1988
- Straight from the Heart: The Very Best of Bonnie Tyler, 1995
- Straight from the Heart (Daryle Singletary album), 2007
- "Straight from the Heart" (The Allman Brothers Band song), 1981
- "Straight from the Heart" (Bryan Adams song), 1983
- "Straight from the Heart" (Doolally song), 1998
- "Straight from the Heart", a song by S Club from the album Seeing Double, 2002

== Film ==
- Straight from the Heart (1935 film), American drama film directed by Scott R. Beal
- Straight from the Heart (1994 film), a documentary film
- Straight from the Heart (1999 film) (Hum Dil De Chuke Sanam), a Bollywood film
- Straight from the Heart (2003 film), a television movie starring Andrew McCarthy

== Literature ==
- Straight from the Hart 2011 autobiography by professional wrestler Bruce Hart
- Straight from the Heart 1986 autobiography by politician Jean Chretien

== Other ==
- Straight from the Heart, a slogan used by 2 Gannett-owned television stations in Knoxville, Tennessee (WBIR-TV 10) and Macon, Georgia (WMAZ-TV 13)

== See also ==
- Straight from My Heart, a 1995 album by Pebbles
- Straight to the Heart (disambiguation)
