= Don't Look Back (Gary Morris song) =

Single by Gary Morris

from the album Gary Morris
- B-side: "She Gave Till Friday"
- Released: February 27, 1982
- Genre: Country
- Length: 3:11
- Label: Warner Bros.
- Songwriter(s): Gary Morris, Eddie Setser
- Producer(s): Marshall Morgan, Paul Worley, Gary Morris

Gary Morris singles chronology
"Headed for a Heartache" (1981)	"Don't Look Back" (1982)	"Dreams Die Hard" (1982)

"Don't Look Back" is a song co-written and recorded by American country music artist Gary Morris. It was released in February 1982 as the second single from the album Gary Morris. The song reached #12 on the Billboard Hot Country Singles & Tracks chart. Morris wrote the song with Eddie Setser.

== Chart performance ==
Chart (1982)	Peak position
US Hot Country Songs (Billboard)	12
Canadian RPM Country Tracks	35
