= Only Love Can Save Me Now =

Single by Crystal Gayle

from the album The Best of Crystal Gayle
- B-side: "'Til I Gain Control Again"
- Released: October 24, 1987
- Recorded: 1986
- Genre: Country
- Length: 3:18
- Label: Warner Bros. Nashville
- Songwriter(s): Tom Shapiro, Chris Waters, Bucky Jones
- Producer(s): Jim Ed Norman

Crystal Gayle singles chronology
| "Nobody Should Have to Love This Way" (1987) | "Only Love Can Save Me Now" (1987) | "Nobody's Angel" (1988) |

"Only Love Can Save Me Now" is a song written by Tom Shapiro, Chris Waters and Bucky Jones, and recorded by American country music artist Crystal Gayle. Originally included on her 1986 studio album Straight to the Heart, it was released in October 1987 as the only single from the compilation album The Best of Crystal Gayle. The song reached number 11 on the Billboard Hot Country Singles & Tracks chart.

== Chart performance ==
| Chart (1987–1988) | Peak position |
|---|---|
| U.S. Billboard Hot Country Singles & Tracks | 11 |
| Canadian RPM Country Tracks | 18 |
