= Mixed Emotions (David Lynn Jones album) =

Studio album by David Lynn Jones
- Released: May 5, 1992
- Studio: The Alamo, Bexar, Arkansas
- Genre: Country
- Length: 40:58
- Label: Liberty Records
- Producer: Richie Albright; David Lynn Jones

David Lynn Jones chronology
Wood, Wind and Stone (1990)	Mixed Emotions (1992)	Play by Ear (1994)

Professional ratings
Review scores
Source	Rating
AllMusic	4.5/5 stars

Mixed Emotions is the third album by David Lynn Jones. It was released May 5, 1992 by Liberty Records.

== Critical reception ==
Brian Mansfield writes for AllMusic, "In his heart he's still country, but he revs the tempos, cranks the guitars, and lays on the horns as he takes off screaming into the Arkansas Delta." AllMusic rated the album 4½ out of a possible 5 stars.

Michael Franklin of Outlaw Magazine writes in an interview with David Lynn Jones, "Jones released Mixed Emotions (on Liberty Records) in 1992, containing exactly zero hits and no charting singles. It did, however, have a couple of songs about religious wars, specifically in the Middle East ("The Land Of Ala", "Judgement Day"). In the boot-scootin’ boogie lights of 1992 Nashville, the expansive Mixed Emotions was a non-starter. Criminally ignored, it was an uncut diamond swept away by a tide of John Deere Green."

== Track listing ==
All tracks are written by David Lynn Jones.

No.	Title	Length
1.	"The Sailor"	4:25
2.	"Louise"	3:03
3.	"Talk to Me"	3:22
4.	"Every Road Is an Open Door"	3:28
5.	"Her Love Don't Lie"	3:49
6.	"Even One"	4:48
7.	"Heart Like a Roadsign, Head Like a Wheel"	3:30
8.	"The Land of Ala"	4:17
9.	"Judgement Day"	3:33
10.	"What Are We Livin' For"	6:43
Total length:		40:58

== Musicians ==
- David Lynn Jones – vocals, guitars, percussion

The Sons of Thunder

- R. P. Harrell – keyboards
- Jerry Bone – bass
- Rick Richards – drums
- Robby Springfield – guitars, pedal steel
- Richie Albright – percussion

Additional musicians

- Bob Henderson – saxophones
- Philip Moore – trombone
- Tim Crouch – mandolin
- Terry McMillan – harp, percussion
- Background vocals – R. P. Harrell, Bob Henderson, Robby Springfield, David Lynn Jones, Debbie Harrell, Jimmie Lou Springfield, Michel Stone

== Production ==
- Joe Scaife – Recording Engineer, Mix Engineer
- R. P. Harrell – Recording Engineer, Mix Engineer
- Greg Parker – Assistant Mix Engineer
- Milan Bogdan – Digital Editing

Track information and credits adapted from the album's liner notes.
