= Diamond in the Dust =

Single by Mark Gray

from the album This Ol' Piano
- Released: October 27, 1984
- Genre: Country
- Length: 2:42
- Label: Columbia
- Songwriter(s): Mark Gray, Sonny LeMaire
- Producer(s): Steve Buckingham, Mark Gray

Mark Gray singles chronology
"If All the Magic Is Gone" (1984)	"Diamond in the Dust" (1984)	"Sometimes When We Touch" (1985)

"Diamond in the Dust" is a song co-written and recorded by American country music artist Mark Gray. It was released in October 1984 as the first single from the album This Ol' Piano. The song reached #9 on the Billboard Hot Country Singles & Tracks chart. The song was written by Gray and Sonny LeMaire.

== Chart performance ==
Chart (1984)	Peak position
US Hot Country Songs (Billboard)	9
Canadian RPM Country Tracks	4
