= Hard Times on Easy Street =

Album by David Lynn Jones

Studio album by David Lynn Jones
- Released: 1987
- Genre: Country
- Length: 37:11
- Label: Mercury
- Producers: David Lynn Jones; Richie Albright; Mick Ronson

David Lynn Jones chronology
Hard Times on Easy Street (1987)	Wood, Wind and Stone (1990)

Professional ratings
Review scores
Source	Rating
Allmusic	3/5 stars

Hard Times on Easy Street is a 1987 album by country singer David Lynn Jones. It was his first release. Willie Nelson's version of "Living in the Promiseland" was a number one hit in 1986. "High Ridin' Heroes" is a duet with Waylon Jennings. The album produced four singles: "Bonnie Jean (Little Sister)", "High Ridin' Heroes", "The Rogue", and "Tonight in America".

== Track listing ==
All songs written by David Lynn Jones; "Tonight in America" co-written by Jimmy Everett.

1. "Bonnie Jean (Little Sister)" – 3:20
2. "High Ridin' Heroes" – 3:13
3. "Home of My Heart" – 3:52
4. "The Rogue" – 4:10
5. "No Easy Way Out" – 5:02
6. "Living in the Promiseland" – 3:47
7. "Tonight in America" – 3:39
8. "Valley of a Thousand Years" – 3:26
9. "Hard Time on Easy Street" – 3:08
10. "See How Far We've Come" – 3:56

== Personnel ==
Musicians

- Cleo Anderson
- Tim Atwood
- Jesse Boyce
- Charlie Chalmers
- Bobby Emmons
- Ray Flacke
- Rob Hajacos
- Jim Horn
- David Humphreys
- George Leo Jackson
- Wayne Jackson
- David Lynn Jones
- Kieran Kane
- Ben Keith
- Billy Earl McClelland
- Terry McMillan
- Johnny Neel
- Larry Paxton
- Mick Ronson
- Willie Weeks
- Bobby Wood
- Roy Yeager

Strings

- Grace Bahng
- Elaine Boda
- David Davidson
- Rosemary Harris
- Connie Heard
- Edgar Meyer
- Mary K. Parker
- Kris Wilkinson

Background vocals

- Lynn Anderson
- Brenda Barnett
- Sandra Chalmers
- Charlie Chalmers
- David Lynn Jones
- Monique Moman
- Donna McElroy
- JoAnn Neal
- Mentor Williams

Technical

- Richie Albright – production
- Don Cobb – assistant engineering
- Jim Gaines – engineering
- David Lynn Jones – production
- Edgar Meyer – string arrangements
- Wayne Neuendorf – engineering
- Gary Paczosa – assistant engineering
- Eric Paul – assistant engineering
- Denny Purcell – mastering
- Mick Ronson – production
