= What If We Fall in Love? =

Album by Crystal Gayle and Gary Morris

Studio album by Crystal Gayle and Gary Morris
- Released: November 1986
- Studios: The Loft, Audio Media Recorders, Bullet Recording and Music City Music Hall (Nashville, Tennessee); The Castle (Franklin, Tennessee); Master Control (Burbank, California); Conway Studios (Hollywood, California).
- Genre: Country
- Length: 41:47
- Label: Warner Bros. Nashville
- Producer: Jim Ed Norman

Crystal Gayle chronology
A Crystal Christmas (1986)	What If We Fall in Love? (1987)	The Best of Crystal Gayle (1987)

Gary Morris chronology
Plain Brown Wrapper (1986)	What If We Fall in Love? (1987)	Hits (1987)

Singles from What If We Fall in Love?
- 1. "Makin' Up for Lost Time (The Dallas Lovers' Song)" Released: October 1985; 2. "Another World" Released: April 25, 1987; 3. "All of This and More" Released: January 1988

Professional ratings
Review scores
Source	Rating
Allmusic	2.5/5 stars

What If We Fall in Love is the only duet album by American country music artists Crystal Gayle and Gary Morris, released in November 1986. Three of the album's tracks found positions on the Billboard Hot Country Singles chart. Chronologically, they were "Makin' Up for Lost Time", which reached the number 1 position, "Another World", which was a number 4 hit, and "All of This and More", which rose to number 26. The album itself rose to number 25 on the Top Country Albums chart.

"Another World" became the theme song of the NBC daytime soap opera Another World; Gayle appeared as herself in a few episodes. "Makin' Up for Lost Time" had been previously featured in the prime-time drama Dallas.

== Track listing ==
No.	Title	Writer(s)	Length
1.	"Another World"	John Leffler, Ralph Schuckett	3:35
2.	"What If We Fall in Love"	Jan Buckingham	4:00
3.	"Who’s Going to Love You Like Me"	Pat Bunch, Mary Ann Kennedy, Pam Rose	4:08
4.	"Love Won’t Let Me Quit"	Austin Roberts, Jack Keller, Beckie Foster	3:25
5.	"One More Try for Love"	Robert Byrne, Brandon Barnes	5:25
6.	"Makin' Up for Lost Time (The Dallas Lovers' Song)"	Gary Morris, Dave Loggins	3:28
7.	"There’s No Love Like Our Love"	Steve Dorff, Eric Kaz	4:04
8.	"All of This and More"	Beckie Foster, Jennifer Kimball, Greg Prestopino	3:36
9.	"Wanna Give My Love"	Dana Merino	3:09
10.	"Reminisce"	Bunch, Kennedy, Rose	7:00

== Personnel ==
Adapted from liner notes.

- Crystal Gayle – lead vocals
- Gary Morris – lead vocals
- John Hobbs – keyboards (1, 2, 5, 8), acoustic piano (9)
- David Innis – synthesizers (1–4, 6, 8, 9, 10)
- Mike Lawler – synthesizers (1–5, 7–10)
- Carl Marsh – Synclavier (2, 9)
- Prentice Marsh – synthesizers (2, 5, 9)
- Alan Pasqua – synthesizers (3, 4, 7, 10)
- Randy Kerber – acoustic piano (4, 7, 10)
- Barry Beckett – acoustic piano (6)
- John Barlow Jarvis – acoustic piano (6)
- Steve Gibson – electric guitar (1, 2, 6), acoustic guitar (5)
- Billy Joe Walker Jr. – electric guitar (1, 2, 5, 8)
- Josh Leo – electric guitar (3, 4, 6, 7, 10)
- Dean Parks – electric guitar (3, 4, 7, 10)
- Larry Byrom – electric guitar (6, 9)
- Joe Chemay – bass (1, 2, 5, 8, 9)
- Neil Stubenhaus – bass (3, 4, 7, 10)
- Michael Rhodes – bass (6)
- Paul Leim – drums (1, 2, 5, 8, 9)
- John Robinson – drums (3, 4, 7, 10)
- Eddie Bayers – percussion (2, 3, 5), drums (6)
- Jim Horn – saxophone (2, 5)
- Dennis Burnside – string arrangements and conductor (1, 4, 5, 10), Fender Rhodes (6)
- Lisa Silver – backing vocals (1, 7)
- Diane Tidwell – backing vocals (1, 7)
- Dennis Wilson – backing vocals (1, 7)
- Vicki Hampton – backing vocals (2, 4, 9)
- Donna McElroy – backing vocals (2, 4, 9)
- JoAnn Neil – backing vocals (2, 4, 9)
- Mary Ann Kennedy – backing vocals (3, 10)
- Pam Rose – backing vocals (3, 10)
- Robert Byrne – backing vocals (5, 8)
- Mac McAnally – backing vocals (5, 8)
- Hershey Reeves – backing vocals (5, 8)

=== Production ===
- Jim Ed Norman – producer
- Eric Prestidge – recording, remixing (9)
- Lee Groitzsch – recording assistant, remix assistant (9)
- Bill Harris – assistant engineer
- Kurt Storey – assistant engineer
- Bob Vogt – assistant engineer
- Csaba Petocz – mixing (1, 2, 3, 5)
- Scott Hendricks – mixing (4, 6, 7, 8, 10)
- Toni Greene – mix assistant (1, 2, 3, 5)
- Richard McKernan – mix assistant (1, 2, 3, 5)
- Jeff Coppage – mix assistant (4, 6, 7, 8, 10)
- Denny Purcell – mastering at Georgetown Masters (Nashville, Tennessee)
- Randee St. Nicholas – photography
- Virginia Team – art direction

== Chart performance ==
Chart (1987)	Peak position
US Top Country Albums (Billboard)	25
