= Gary Morris (album) =

Studio album by Gary Morris
- Released: March 15, 1982
- Genre: Country
- Length: 31:13
- Label: Warner Bros.
- Producer: Gary Morris (all tracks except 8); Norro Wilson (track 8); Paul Worley (all tracks except 8); Marshall Morgan (all tracks except 8)

Gary Morris chronology
Gary Morris (1982)	Why Lady Why (1983)

Gary Morris is the debut studio album American country music artist Gary Morris. It was released on March 15, 1982 via Warner Bros. Records. The album includes the singles "Headed for a Heartache", "Don't Look Back" and "Dreams Die Hard".

== Track listing ==
No.	Title	Writer(s)	Length
1.	"Headed for a Heartache"	James Dowell, Kent Blazy	3:13
2.	"Something's Falling"	Michael Clark	2:29
3.	"Dreams Die Hard"	Chick Rains	3:17
4.	"When I Close My Eyes"	Gary Morris	3:46
5.	"Don't Look Back"	Eddie Setser, Morris	3:11
6.	"I Can Tell by the Way You Dance"	Robb Strandlund, Sandy Pinkard	2:31
7.	"Dancin' the Night Away"	Morris	2:35
8.	"Sweet Red Wine"	Randy DuBois, Tim DuBois	3:19
9.	"No Place to Hide"	Setser, Morris	3:15
10.	"Day by Day"	Setser, Morris	4:17

== Personnel ==
Adapted from liner notes.

- Acoustic Guitar: Mark Casstevens, Gary Morris, Rafe Van Hoy, Paul Worley
- Electric Guitar: Fred Newell, Paul Worley
- Bass Guitar: David Hungate, Joe Osborn
- Steel Guitar: Sonny Garrish
- Keyboards: Dennis Burnside
- Drums: Eddie Bayers
- Synthesizer: Shane Keister
- Harmonica: Mark Casstevens
- Lead Vocals: Gary Morris
- Background Vocals: Jessica Boucher, Steve Brantley, Paulette Carlson, Bruce Dees, Gary Morris, Dennis Wilson, Marcia Wood, Paul Worley

Strings performed by The Nashville String Machine, arranged by Dennis Burnside.

== Chart performance ==
Chart (1982)	Peak position
US Top Country Albums (Billboard)	39
