= Anything Goes (Gary Morris album) =

Studio album by Gary Morris
- Released: July 15, 1985
- Genre: Country
- Label: Warner Bros.
- Producer: Jim Ed Norman

Gary Morris chronology
Faded Blue (1984)	Anything Goes (1985)	Plain Brown Wrapper (1986)

Singles from Anything Goes
- 1. "I'll Never Stop Loving You" Released: July 1985; 2. "100% Chance of Rain" Released: December 1985; 3. "Anything Goes" Released: May 17, 1986

Anything Goes is the fourth studio album by American country music artist Gary Morris. It was released on July 15, 1985, via Warner Bros. Records. The album peaked at number 1 on the Billboard Top Country Albums chart.

== Track listing ==
No.	Title	Writer(s)	Length
1.	"100% Chance of Rain"	Charlie Black, Austin Roberts	3:41
2.	"I'll Never Stop Loving You"	Dave Loggins, J. D. Martin	3:39
3.	"Anything Goes"	Gary Morris, Eddie Setser	4:37
4.	"Back in Her Arms Again"	Morris	3:50
5.	"South December Road"	Van Stephenson, Dave Robbins, George Green	4:50
6.	"Heaven's Hell Without You"	Morris, Setser	5:31
7.	"Draggin' the Lake for the Moon"	Morris	4:55
8.	"Try Gettin' Over You"	Michael Bolton, Doug James	4:09
9.	"Wildflower"	Dave Richardson, Doug Edwards	5:17
10.	"What You Gonna Do About Her"	Quentin Powers	3:44

== Personnel ==
Adapted from liner notes.

- Gary Baker - bass guitar (track 10), background vocals (track 10)
- Eddie Bayers - drums (tracks 1–4, 7, 9, 10)
- Barry Beckett - electric piano (tracks 2, 7), piano (track 9)
- Doris Belcher - background vocals (track 3)
- Jamie Brantley - acoustic guitar (track 4), electric guitar (tracks 4, 6), background vocals (all tracks except 1 & 10)
- Steve Brantley - background vocals (all tracks except 1 & 10)
- Clyde Brooks - drums (tracks 6, 8)
- Dennis Burnside - electric piano (tracks 8, 9), synthesizer (tracks 1–3, 6, 7)
- Larry Byrom - acoustic guitar (track 4), electric guitar (tracks 2, 7, 9)
- Bruce Dees - background vocals (tracks 2–5, 7–9)
- Bob DiPiero - acoustic guitar (track 7)
- Steve Gibson - acoustic guitar (tracks 2, 6), electric guitar (tracks 1, 3, 7, 9, 10)
- Emily Harris - background vocals (track 3)
- Gary Hooker - electric guitar (track 2), background vocals (track 6)
- David Innis - synthesizer (all tracks except 4)
- John Barlow Jarvis - electric piano (tracks 1, 8), piano (tracks 3–5, 8)
- Robin Johnson - background vocals (track 3)
- Bobby Jones - background vocals (track 3)
- Derrick Lee - background vocals (track 3)
- Josh Leo - electric guitar (tracks 1, 3, 6)
- Mac McAnally - acoustic guitar (track 10), synthesizer (track 10), background vocals (track 10)
- Gary Morris - lead vocals (all tracks), background vocals (track 1)
- Michael Rhodes - bass guitar (all tracks except 5 & 10)
- Tom Roady - percussion (tracks 2, 4, 7, 8)
- John Scott Sherrill - acoustic guitar (track 7)
- Paul Worley - acoustic guitar (tracks 1, 3), electric guitar (track 8)

== Chart performance ==
Chart (1985)	Peak position
US Top Country Albums (Billboard)	1
