= Craig Dillingham =

American singer-songwriter

- Born: 1958 (age 67–68)
- Origin: Brownwood, Texas, United States
- Genre: Country
- Occupation: Singer
- Instrument: Vocals
- Years active: 1960s–1986
- Label: MCA/Curb

Craig Dillingham (born 1958 in Brownwood, Texas) is an American country music artist. Before signing to Curb Records in 1983, Dillingham performed with his family musical group and later served as an opening act for Ray Price, in addition to performing on the Louisiana Hayride. He charted five singles for the label between 1983 and 1986, including "Have You Loved Your Woman Today", his only Top 40 hit on the Billboard country charts.

In 1983, Dillingham was nominated for Top New Male Vocalist at the Academy of Country Music Awards.

== Singles ==
Year	Single	US Country
1983	"Have You Loved Your Woman Today"	32
1984	"Honky Tonk Women Make Honky Tonk Men"	47
1984	"1984"	58
1985	"Next to You"	78
1986	"I'll Pull You Through" (with Tish Hinojosa)	80

== Awards and nominations ==
Year	Organization	Award	Nominee/Work	Result
1984	Academy of Country Music Awards	Top New Male Vocalist	Craig Dillingham	Nominated
