= The Love She Found in Me =

Single by Gary Morris

from the album Why Lady Why
- B-side: "That's the Way It Is"
- Released: April 16, 1983
- Genre: Country
- Length: 3:33
- Label: Warner Bros
- Songwriter(s): Dennis Linde, Bob Morrison
- Producer(s): Bob Montgomery, Marshall Morgan, Paul Worley

Gary Morris singles chronology
"Velvet Chains" (1982)	"The Love She Found in Me" (1983)	"The Wind Beneath My Wings" (1983)

"The Love She Found in Me" is a song written by Dennis Linde and Bob Morrison, and recorded by American country music artist Gary Morris. It was released in April 1983 as the second single from the album Why Lady Why. The song reached #5 on the Billboard Hot Country Singles & Tracks chart.

== Charts ==
=== Weekly charts ===
Chart (1983)	Peak position
US Hot Country Songs (Billboard)	5
Canadian RPM Country Tracks	27

=== Year-end charts ===
Chart (1983)	Position
US Hot Country Songs (Billboard)	34
