= Lloyd David Foster =

American country music singer (born 1952)

- Born: 1952 (age 73–74)
- Origin: Wills Point, Texas, United States
- Genre: Country
- Occupation: Singer
- Instruments: Vocals; Guitar
- Years active: 1982-1985
- Labels: MCA; Columbia

Lloyd David Foster (born 1952, in Wills Point, Texas) is an American country music singer. Between 1982 and 1985, he released seven singles off of MCA and Columbia Records that also charted on the Billboard Hot Country Songs charts. He was also nominated for Top New Male Vocalist of the Year at the Academy of Country Music Awards in 1985, losing to Vince Gill. His two biggest hits were "Blue Rendezvous" and "Unfinished Business", both hit No. 32 on the charts in 1982 and 1983.

== Discography ==
=== Singles ===
Year	Single	Peak positions
Year	Single	US Country
1982	"Blue Rendezvous"	32
1982	"Honky Tonk Magic"	65
1983	"Unfinished Business"	32
1983	"You've Got That Touch"	60
1984	"I'm Gonna Love You Right Out of the Blues"	44
1985	"I Can Feel the Fire Goin' Out"	55
1985	"I'm As Over You As I'm Ever Gonna Get"	68

== Awards and nominations ==
Year	Organization	Award	Nominee/Work	Result
1985	Academy of Country Music Awards	Top New Male Vocalist	Lloyd David Foster	Nominated
