= Anything Goes (1989 London Cast Recording) =

Cast recording by the London cast
- Released: 1989
- Genre: Cast recording
- Label: First Night Records

Anything Goes is the cast recording of the 1989 London production of the Cole Porter musical of the same name.

== Principal artists ==
- Elaine Paige
- Howard McGillin
- Bernard Cribbins
- Kathryn Evans

== Track listing ==
1. Overture
2. I Get A Kick Out Of You
3. There's No Cure Like Travel
4. Bon Voyage
5. Last Seating For Supper
6. You're The Top
7. Easy To Love
8. Easy To Love (Reprise)
9. Crew Song
10. There'll Always Be A Lady Fair
11. Friendship
12. It's De Lovely
13. Anything Goes
14. Interlude
15. Public Enemy Number One
16. Blow Gabriel Blow
17. Goodbye Little Dream Goodbye
18. Be Like The Bluebird
19. All Through The Night
20. Gypsy In Me
21. Buddie Beware
22. Finale: I Get A Kick Out Of You

== Singles ==
Elaine Paige released the title track as a single with 'I get a kick out of you' as the B side.
