= Headed for a Heartache =

Single by Gary Morris

from the album Gary Morris
- B-side: "I'm So Tired of Losing You"
- Released: August 1981
- Recorded: June 1981
- Genre: Country
- Length: 3:15
- Label: Warner Bros.
- Songwriter(s): Kent Blazy, James Dowell
- Producer(s): Marshall Morgan, Paul Worley, Gary Morris

Gary Morris singles chronology
"Fire in Your Eyes" (1981)	"Headed for a Heartache" (1981)	"Don't Look Back" (1982)

"Headed for a Heartache" is a song written by Kent Blazy and James Dowell, and recorded by American country music artist Gary Morris. It was released in August 1981 as the first single from the album Gary Morris. The song reached number 8 on the Billboard Hot Country Singles & Tracks chart.

== Chart performance ==
Chart (1981)	Peak position
US Hot Country Songs (Billboard)	8
Canadian RPM Country Tracks	22
