= Makin' Up for Lost Time (The Dallas Lovers' Song) =

Single by Crystal Gayle and Gary Morris

from the album What If We Fall in Love?
- B-side: "A Few Good Men" by The Forester Sisters
- Released: October 1985
- Genre: Country
- Length: 3:28
- Label: Warner Bros.
- Songwriter(s): Gary Morris; Dave Loggins
- Producer(s): Jim Ed Norman

Crystal Gayle singles chronology
"A Long and Lasting Love" (1985)	"Makin' Up for Lost Time (The Dallas Lovers' Song)" (1985)	"Cry" (1986)

Gary Morris singles chronology
"I'll Never Stop Loving You" (1985)	"Makin' Up for Lost Time (The Dallas Lovers Song)" (1985)	"Wildflower" (1986)

"Makin' Up for Lost Time (The Dallas Lovers' Song)" is a song recorded as a duet by American country music artists Crystal Gayle and Gary Morris. The song was from the CBS TV series Dallas. It was released in October 1985 as the first single from the album What If We Fall in Love?. The song was the most successful country hit for the duo of Crystal Gayle and Gary Morris. The single went to number one for one week and spent a total of 14 weeks on the country chart. Morris wrote the song with Dave Loggins.

== Chart performance ==
Chart (1985–1986)	Peak position
US Hot Country Songs (Billboard)	1
Canadian RPM Country Tracks	1
