= Lasso the Moon =

Single by Gary Morris

from the album Rustlers' Rhapsody (soundtrack)
- B-side: "When I Close My Eyes"
- Released: May 4, 1985
- Genre: Country
- Length: 3:28
- Label: Warner Bros.
- Songwriter(s): Steve Dorff, Milton Brown
- Producer(s): Steve Dorff, Jim Ed Norman

Gary Morris singles chronology
"Baby Bye Bye" (1985)	"Lasso the Moon" (1985)	"I'll Never Stop Loving You" (1985)

"Lasso the Moon" is a song written by Steve Dorff and Milton Brown, and recorded by American country music artist Gary Morris. The song was released in May 1985 and was featured on the soundtrack to the comedy-western film Rustlers' Rhapsody. The song reached number 9 on the Billboard Hot Country Singles chart.

== Chart performance ==
Chart (1985)	Peak position
US Hot Country Songs (Billboard)	9
Canadian RPM Country Tracks	8
