= Darrell Clanton =

American singer-songwriter

- Born: Darrell Puckett; August 10, 1956 (age 70); Indianapolis, Indiana, U.S.
- Origin: South Pasadena, Florida, U.S.
- Genre: Country
- Occupation: Singer-songwriter
- Instrument: Vocals
- Years active: 1983 – present
- Labels: Audiograph, Warner Bros.

Darrell Puckett (born August 10, 1956), known professionally as Darrell Clanton, is an American country music artist. In the mid-1980s, he recorded for Audiograph and Warner Bros. Records, charting three singles on the Billboard country charts. The highest of the three was "Lonesome 7-7203," which reached No. 24 on the country charts in 1984.

== Biography ==
Puckett was born in Indianapolis, Indiana and raised in South Pasadena, Florida. He attended Boca Ciega High School and toured the area as a member of several bands.

He moved to Nashville, Tennessee at age 22, where he found work as an assistant to Pete Drake, a session musician. He also began working as a songwriter for material recorded by B.J. Thomas, Charlie Louvin and Bobby Vinton. Puckett also recorded a demo for Justin Tubb, who encouraged him to pursue a career as a recording artist. After Puckett signed to Warner Bros. Records, label executives then suggested that he change his surname to Clanton, after the town of Clanton, Alabama.

Clanton released his debut single, a cover version of Hawkshaw Hawkins's "Lonesome 7-7203" (written by Justin Tubb) in late 1983. By February 1984, Clanton's version peaked at No. 24 on the Billboard country singles charts and No. 21 on the Canadian RPM Country Tracks charts.

In 1984, Clanton was nominated for Top New Male Vocalist at the Academy of Country Music Awards. In March 1984, he charted his second single, "I'll Take as Much of You as I Can Get", which peaked at No. 75, followed by "I Forgot that I Don't Live Here Anymore" at No. 56. The latter song was boycotted by Mothers Against Drunk Driving, and he exited the label.

Clanton performed at the Grand Ole Opry three times in 1984, and was booked to open for Lynn Anderson and Hank Williams, Jr. He found work as a music producer, but returned to Florida with his fiancée in 2003.

Clanton's 2005 self-released album is titled Someplace Sunny. Several of his songs were included in a collection of albums titled Stars of the Grand Ole Opry, including the Wilburn Brothers and Jean Shepard. Since the 2000s, he has resumed playing at local bars in the Tampa Bay area (he lives in Clearwater).

== Discography ==
=== Studio albums ===
Title	Album details
Someplace Sunny	Release date: June 29, 2005; Label: Splattermouth

=== Singles ===
Year	Single	Peak chart positions	
Year	Single	US Country	CAN Country
1983	"Lonesome 7-7203"	24	21
1984	"I'll Take as Much of You as I Can Get"	75	—
1985	"I Forgot that I Don't Live Here Anymore"	56	—
"—" denotes releases that did not chart

== Awards and nominations ==
Year	Organization	Award	Nominee/Work	Result
1984	Academy of Country Music Awards	Top New Male Vocalist	Darrell Clanton	Nominated
