= Living in the Promiseland =

Single by Willie Nelson

from the album The Promiseland
- B-side: "Bach Minuet in G"
- Released: February 1986
- Genre: Country
- Length: 3:18
- Label: Columbia
- Songwriter: David Lynn Jones
- Producer: Willie Nelson

Willie Nelson singles chronology
| "Me and Paul" (1985) | "Living in the Promiseland" (1986) | "I'm Not Trying to Forget You" (1986) |

"Living in the Promiseland" is a song written by David Lynn Jones, and recorded by American country music artist Willie Nelson. It was released in February 1986 as the first single from the album The Promiseland. The song was Nelson's twelfth number one single on the country chart as a solo artist, spending one week at number one and twenty weeks on the chart and was sung in the end credits of the 1987 HBO crime drama, Into the Homeland.

In 1988, Jones recorded his own version of the song for his 1988 album Hard Times on Easy Street, produced by Richie Albright and Mick Ronson, and included it as the B-side to his single "High Ridin' Heroes", a duet with Waylon Jennings, which reached number 14 on the same chart.

== Chart performance ==
| Chart (1986) | Peak position |
|---|---|
| US Hot Country Songs (Billboard) | 1 |
| Canadian RPM Country Tracks | 1 |
