= Velvet Chains =

Single by Gary Morris

from the album Why Lady Why
- B-side: "When I Close My Eyes"
- Released: November 27, 1982
- Genre: Country
- Length: 2:23
- Label: Warner Bros.
- Songwriter(s): Kevin Welch, Ron Hellard
- Producer(s): Marshall Morgan, Paul Worley

Gary Morris singles chronology
| "Dreams Die Hard" (1982) | "Velvet Chains" (1982) | "The Love She Found in Me" (1983) |

"Velvet Chains" is a song written by Kevin Welch and Ron Hellard, and recorded by American country music artist Gary Morris. It was released in November 1982 as the first single from the album Why Lady Why. The song reached #9 on the Billboard Hot Country Singles & Tracks chart.

== Chart performance ==
| Chart (1982–1983) | Peak position |
|---|---|
| US Hot Country Songs (Billboard) | 9 |
| Canadian RPM Country Tracks | 31 |
