= Plain Brown Wrapper (album) =

Studio album by Gary Morris
- Released: August 18, 1986
- Genre: Country
- Length: 35:41
- Label: Warner Bros.
- Producer: Gary Morris

Gary Morris chronology
| Anything Goes (1985) | Plain Brown Wrapper (1986) | What If We Fall in Love? (1987) |

Plain Brown Wrapper is the fifth studio album by American country music artist Gary Morris. It was released on August 18, 1986, via Warner Bros. The album includes the singles "Honeycomb', "Leave Me Lonely" and "Plain Brown Wrapper", the album's title track.

== Track listing ==
| No. | Title | Writer(s) | Length |
|---|---|---|---|
| 1. | "Better Than the New" | Dave Loggins | 4:30 |
| 2. | "Honeycomb" | Bob Merrill | 4:26 |
| 3. | "Today I Started Loving You Again" | Merle Haggard, Bonnie Owens | 3:12 |
| 4. | "Leave Me Lonely" | Gary Morris | 3:48 |
| 5. | "Lovesick Blues" | Cliff Friend, Irving Mills | 2:50 |
| 6. | "I'm So Lonesome I Could Cry" | Hank Williams | 3:32 |
| 7. | "Eleventh Hour" | Morris, Kevin Welch | 4:17 |
| 8. | "Moonshine" | Morris, Welch | 2:04 |
| 9. | "Ain't Got Nothin' But the Blues" | Duke Ellington, Don George | 3:06 |
| 10. | "Plain Brown Wrapper" | Morris, Welch | 3:56 |

== Personnel ==
Adapted from liner notes.

- Jamie Brantley - guitar, background vocals
- Steve Brantley - bass guitar, background vocals
- Mike Brigham - drums
- Mark Casstevens - guitar, banjo, mandolin
- Jerry Douglas - dobro, lap steel guitar
- Gary Hooker - guitar, background vocals
- Edgar Meyer - string bass
- Gary Morris - lead vocals, background vocals
- Mark O'Connor - violin, mandolin
- Howard Simpers - falling star
- Paul Worley - guitar

== Chart performance ==
| Chart (1986) | Peak position |
|---|---|
| US Top Country Albums (Billboard) | 9 |
