= Why Lady Why (Gary Morris song) =

Single by Gary Morris

from the album Why Lady Why
- B-side: "The Way I Love You Tonight"
- Released: November 26, 1983
- Genre: Country
- Length: 2:50
- Label: Warner Bros.
- Songwriter(s): Gary Morris, Eddie Setser
- Producer(s): Bob Montgomery

Gary Morris singles chronology
"The Wind Beneath My Wings" (1983)	"Why Lady Why" (1983)	"You're Welcome to Tonight" (1983)

"Why Lady Why" is a song co-written and recorded by American country music artist Gary Morris. It was released in November 1983 as the fourth single and title track from the album Why Lady Why. The song reached #4 on the Billboard Hot Country Singles & Tracks chart. Morris wrote the song with Eddie Setser.

== Chart performance ==
Chart (1983–1984)	Peak position
US Hot Country Songs (Billboard)	4
Canadian RPM Country Tracks	6
