= Mark Gray (singer) =

American singer-songwriter

Background information
- Born: Mark Eugene Gray; October 24, 1952; Vicksburg, Mississippi, U.S.
- Died: December 2, 2016 (aged 64) Lebanon, Tennessee, U.S.
- Genre: Country
- Occupation: Singer
- Instruments: Vocals, keyboards
- Years active: 1972–1988
- Labels: Columbia, 615
- Formerly of: Exile

Mark Eugene Gray (October 24, 1952 – December 2, 2016) was an American singer-songwriter and country music artist. He recorded both as a solo artist for Columbia Records and as a member of the country pop band Exile, of which he was a member between 1979 and 1982.

Gray's solo career included three albums and nine singles, of which the highest-peaking is the number six Tammy Wynette duet "Sometimes When We Touch", a cover of the Dan Hill song. Gray also co-wrote "Take Me Down" and "The Closer You Get", both of which were originally recorded by Exile in 1980 and later became number one hits for Alabama. Other songs that Gray co-wrote include "It Ain't Easy Bein' Easy" for Janie Fricke and "Second Hand Heart" for Gary Morris.

He died on December 2, 2016, at the age of 64.

== Discography ==
=== Albums ===
| Title | Album details | Peak positions |
| Title | Album details | US Country |
|---|---|---|
| Magic | Release date: April 1984; Label: Columbia Records | 26 |
| This Ol' Piano | Release date: November 1984; Label: Columbia Records | 33 |
| That Feeling Inside | Release date: January 1986; Label: Columbia Records | 35 |

=== Singles ===
| Year | Title | Peak positions | | Album |
| Year | Title | US Country | CAN Country | Album |
|---|---|---|---|---|
| 1983 | "It Ain't Real (If It Ain't You)" | 25 | — | Magic |
| 1983 | "Wounded Hearts" | 18 | — | Magic |
| 1984 | "Left Side of the Bed" | 10 | 28 | Magic |
| 1984 | "If All the Magic Is Gone" | 9 | 6 | Magic |
| 1984 | "Diamond in the Dust" | 9 | 4 | This Ol' Piano |
| 1985 | "Sometimes When We Touch" (with Tammy Wynette) | 6 | 24 | This Ol' Piano |
| 1985 | "Smooth Sailing (Rock in the Road)" | 43 | 30 | This Ol' Piano |
| 1985 | "Please Be Love" | 7 | 3 | That Feeling Inside |
| 1986 | "Back When Love Was Enough" | 14 | 7 | That Feeling Inside |
"—" denotes releases that did not chart

== Awards and nominations ==
=== Academy of Country Music Awards ===
| Year | Nominee / work | Award | Result |
|---|---|---|---|
| 1984 | Mark Gray | Top New Male Vocalist | Nominated |
| 1985 | "Left Side of the Bed" | Video of the Year | Nominated |
| 1985 | "Second Hand Heart" | Song of the Year | Nominated |
