= Anything Goes (Gary Morris song) =

Single by Gary Morris

from the album Anything Goes
- B-side: "Draggin' the Lake for the Moon"
- Released: May 17, 1986
- Genre: Country
- Length: 4:37
- Label: Warner Bros.
- Songwriter(s): Gary Morris, Eddie Setser
- Producer(s): Jim Ed Norman

Gary Morris singles chronology
"100% Chance of Rain" (1986)	"Anything Goes" (1986)	"Honeycomb" (1986)

"Anything Goes" is a song co-written and recorded by American country music artist Gary Morris. It released in May 1986 as the fourth single and title track from the album Anything Goes. The song reached #28 on the Billboard Hot Country Singles & Tracks chart. The song was written by Morris and Eddie Setser.

== Chart performance ==
Chart (1986)	Peak position
US Hot Country Songs (Billboard)	28
Canadian RPM Country Tracks	52
