= Plain Brown Wrapper (song) =

Single by Gary Morris

from the album Plain Brown Wrapper
- B-side: "Moonshine"
- Released: February 28, 1987
- Genre: Country
- Length: 3:54
- Label: Warner Bros.
- Songwriter(s): Gary Morris, Kevin Welch
- Producer(s): Gary Morris

Gary Morris singles chronology
"Leave Me Lonely" (1986)	"Plain Brown Wrapper" (1987)	"Finishing Touches" (1987)

"Plain Brown Wrapper" is a song co-written and recorded by American country music artist Gary Morris. It was released in February 1987 as the second single and title track from the album Plain Brown Wrapper. The song reached #9 on the Billboard Hot Country Singles & Tracks chart. Morris wrote the song with Kevin Welch.

== Chart performance ==
Chart (1987)	Peak position
US Hot Country Songs (Billboard)	9
Canadian RPM Country Tracks	9
