= Baby Bye Bye =

Single by Gary Morris

from the album Faded Blue
- B-side: "West Texas Highway and Me"
- Released: October 1984
- Recorded: c. December 1983
- Genre: Country
- Length: 3:20
- Label: Warner Bros.
- Songwriter(s): Gary Morris; Jamie Brantley
- Producer(s): Jim Ed Norman

Gary Morris singles chronology
"Second Hand Heart" (1984)	"Baby Bye Bye" (1984)	"Lasso the Moon" (1985)

"Baby Bye Bye" is a song co-written and recorded by American country music artist Gary Morris. It was released in October 1984 as the third single from the album Faded Blue. The song was written by Morris and Jamie Brantley.

The song was Morris' first No. 1 hit on the Billboard Hot Country Singles chart in the late winter of 1985. The song's single week atop the chart was part of a 15-week run within the Hot Country Singles' chart top 40.

== Content ==
The song is about a man who breaks up with his highly desirable and beautiful, but unfaithful girlfriend.

== Chart performance ==
Chart (1984–1985)	Peak position
US Hot Country Songs (Billboard)	1
Canadian RPM Country Tracks	1
