= Straight to the Heart (song) =

Single by Crystal Gayle

from the album Straight to the Heart
- B-side: "Do I Have to Say Goodbye"
- Released: November 1986 (U.S.)
- Recorded: 1986
- Genre: Country
- Length: 3:59
- Label: Warner Bros. Nashville
- Songwriter(s): Terry Britten; Graham Lyle
- Producer(s): Jim Ed Norman

Crystal Gayle singles chronology
"Cry" (1986)	"Straight to the Heart" (1986)	"Another World" (1987)

"Straight to the Heart" is a song written by Terry Britten and Graham Lyle, and recorded by American country music artist Crystal Gayle. It was released in November 1986 as the second single and title track from the album Straight to the Heart. The song was Gayle's 18th and, to date, last No. 1 hit of her career.

== Charts ==
Chart (1986–1987)	Peak position
US Hot Country Songs (Billboard)	1
Canadian RPM Country Tracks	2
