= Second Hand Heart (Gary Morris song) =

Single by Gary Morris

from the album Faded Blue
- B-side: "Whoever's Watchin'"
- Released: July 28, 1984
- Genre: Soft rock, Adult Contemporary
- Length: 4:10
- Label: Warner Bros.
- Songwriter(s): Mark Gray, Harold Tipton, Craig Karp
- Producer(s): Jim Ed Norman, Gary Morris

Gary Morris singles chronology
"Between Two Fires" (1984)	"Second Hand Heart" (1984)	"Baby Bye Bye" (1985)

"Second Hand Heart" is a song written by Mark Gray, Harold Tipton and Craig Karp, and recorded by American country music artist Gary Morris. It was released in July 1984 as the second single from the album Faded Blue. The song reached #7 on the Billboard Hot Country Singles & Tracks chart.

== Chart positions ==
Chart (1984)	Peak position
US Hot Country Songs (Billboard)	7
Canadian RPM Country Tracks	6
