= Leave Me Lonely (Gary Morris song) =

Single by Gary Morris

from the album Plain Brown Wrapper
- B-side: "Eleventh Hour"
- Released: October 1986
- Genre: Country
- Length: 3:48
- Label: Warner Bros.
- Songwriter(s): Gary Morris
- Producer(s): Gary Morris

Gary Morris singles chronology
| "Honeycomb" (1986) | "Leave Me Lonely" (1986) | "Plain Brown Wrapper" (1987) |

"Leave Me Lonely" is a song written and recorded by American country music artist Gary Morris. It was released in October 1986 as the second single from the album Plain Brown Wrapper. The song was Morris' fourth and final number one on the country chart as a solo artist. The single went to number one for one week and spent a total of fifteen weeks on the country chart.

== Charts ==
=== Weekly charts ===
| Chart (1986–1987) | Peak position |
|---|---|
| US Hot Country Songs (Billboard) | 1 |
| Canadian RPM Country Tracks | 1 |

=== Year-end charts ===
| Chart (1987) | Position |
|---|---|
| US Hot Country Songs (Billboard) | 24 |
