= Straight to the Heart (Crystal Gayle album) =

Studio album by Crystal Gayle
- Released: August 1986
- Studio: Sound Stage Studios, The Loft and Bullet Recording (Nashville, Tennessee).
- Genre: Country
- Label: Warner Bros. Nashville
- Producer: Jim Ed Norman

Crystal Gayle chronology
Nobody Wants to Be Alone (1985)	Straight to the Heart (1986)	A Crystal Christmas (1986)

Straight to the Heart is the thirteenth album by the American country music singer Crystal Gayle. Released in August 1986, it peaked at number 12 on the Billboard Country Albums chart.

Two singles from the album, "Cry" and "Straight to the Heart", both reached number 1 on the Country Singles Chart in 1986. Further hits were "Nobody Should Have To Love This Way" at number 26, and "Only Love Can Save Me Now" at number 11. Three songs: "Deep Down", "Lonely Girl” and "Cry" were performed on several episodes of the daytime drama Another World in 1987, with Gayle appearing as herself.

== Track listing ==
No.	Title	Writer(s)	Length
1.	"Straight to the Heart"	Graham Lyle, Terry Britten	4:00
2.	"Cry"	Churchill Kohlman	4:18
3.	"Take This Heart"	Peter Leinheiser, Kathy Cotter	3:05
4.	"A Little Bit Closer"	Thom Schuyler, Pam Rose, Mary Ann Kennedy	3:27
5.	"Do I Have to Say Goodbye?"	Peter McCann, Jim McBride	3:00
6.	"Deep Down"	Gary Nicholson, Kevin Welch	3:01
7.	"Crazy in the Heart"	Bob Garfrerick, Billy Henderson	3:05
8.	"Only Love Can Save Me Now"	Bucky Jones, Chris Waters, Tom Shapiro	3:24
9.	"Nobody Should Have to Love This Way"	Tommy Rocco, Charlie Black, Rory Bourke	4:12
10.	"Lonely Girl"	Josh Leo	3:47

== Personnel ==
- Crystal Gayle – lead vocals, backing vocals (1, 3, 9)
- Mike Lawler – synthesizers (1–7, 9, 10)
- David Innis – synthesizers (2, 3)
- Charles Cochran – synthesizers (4–7), acoustic piano (9)
- Vince Melamed – synthesizers (10)
- Steve Gibson – electric guitar (1–4, 6–9), acoustic guitar (2, 4, 5, 9)
- Josh Leo – electric guitar (1–7, 10), acoustic guitar (8), percussion (10)
- Larry Byrom – electric guitar (2, 3, 4, 7)
- Reggie Young – electric guitar (5, 9)
- John McFee – electric guitar (8), backing vocals (8)
- Sonny Garrish – steel guitar (2)
- Michael Rhodes – bass (1–4, 6, 8, 9, 10)
- Larry Paxton – bass (5)
- Tom Robb – bass (7)
- James Stroud – drums (1, 4–10), percussion (1, 10)
- Eddie Bayers – drums (2, 3)
- Jim Horn – saxophone (2, 7)
- Bergen White – string arrangements and conductor (2, 9)
- Bruce Dees – backing vocals (1, 4, 5, 6, 9)
- Cindy Richardson – backing vocals (1, 3, 4, 9, 10)
- Val & Birdie (Frank Saulino and James Valentini) – backing vocals (1, 4, 5, 6, 9)
- Philip Forrest – backing vocals (2)
- Lisa Silver – backing vocals (2)
- Diane Tidwell – backing vocals (2)
- Dennis Wilson – backing vocals (2, 3, 10)
- Larry Lee – backing vocals (3, 10)
- Harry Stinson – backing vocals (3, 10)
- Tim Goodman – backing vocals (8)
- Keith Knudsen – backing vocals (8)

=== Production ===
- Crystal Gayle – album direction
- Jim Ed Norman – producer
- Eric Prestidge – recording, mixing, mastering
- Lee Groitzsch – additional recording, recording assistant
- Chris Hammond – recording assistant
- Bob Vogt – recording assistant
- Denny Purcell – mastering
- Georgetown Masters (Nashville, Tennessee) – mastering location
- Laura LiPuma – art direction, design
- Stuart Watson – photography

== Chart performance ==
Chart (1986)	Peak position,
U.S. Billboard Top Country Albums	12
