= Left Side of the Bed =

Single by Mark Gray

from the album Magic
- B-side: "Fire from a Friend"
- Released: January 1984
- Genre: Country
- Length: 3:08
- Label: Columbia
- Songwriter(s): Mark Gray; Sonny LeMaire; Brian Woods
- Producer(s): Bob Montgomery; Steve Buckingham

Mark Gray singles chronology
"Wounded Hearts" (1983)	"Left Side of the Bed" (1984)	"If All the Magic Is Gone" (1984)

"Left Side of the Bed" is a song by American country music singer Mark Gray. It was released in January 1984 as the third single from his debut solo studio album Magic. Gray wrote the song with Sonny LeMaire and Brian Woods.

== Content ==
Prior to recording as a solo artist for Columbia Records, Mark Gray was a member of Exile. Sonny LeMaire, also a member of Exile, co-wrote "Left Side of the Bed". After leaving Exile, Gray began writing songs and recording demos for Janie Fricke. Producer and songwriter Bob Montgomery liked the sound of Gray's voice on the demos and signed him to Columbia in 1983. "Left Side of the Bed" was Gray's third Columbia release, and appeared on his 1984 album Magic.

== Music video ==
"Left Side of the Bed" was made into a music video, directed by Paul Flattery. Said video is nearly ten minutes long, featuring spoken dialogue and acting roles for Gray in between the verses. Robert K. Oermann, writing for The Tennessean, describes the song's video as the "first long-form 'mini-movie' concept video". The video was nominated in 1985 by the Academy of Country Music in the category of Music Video of the Year, a category which debuted that year.

== Chart performance ==
Chart (1984)	Peak position
US Hot Country Songs (Billboard)	10
Canadian RPM Country Tracks	28
