= 100% Chance of Rain =

Single by Gary Morris

from the album Anything Goes
- B-side: "Back in Her Arms Again"
- Released: December 1985
- Recorded: 1985
- Genre: Soft rock
- Length: 3:42
- Label: Warner Bros.
- Songwriter(s): Charlie Black and Austin Roberts
- Producer(s): Jim Ed Norman

Gary Morris singles chronology
| "Wildflower" (1985) | "100% Chance of Rain" (1985) | "Anything Goes" (1986) |

"100% Chance of Rain" is a song written by Charlie Black and Austin Roberts, and recorded by American country music artist Gary Morris. It was released in December 1985 as the third single from the album Anything Goes. The song was Morris' third number one on the country chart as a solo artist. The single went to number one for one week and spent a total of thirteen weeks on the country chart.

== Background ==
This song displays a little more soft rock influence instead of country pop.

== Chart performance ==
| Chart (1985–1986) | Peak position |
|---|---|
| US Hot Country Songs (Billboard) | 1 |
| Canadian RPM Country Tracks | 1 |
