= Wind Beneath My Wings =

1982 Jeff Silbar and Larry Henley song

"Wind Beneath My Wings" (sometimes titled "The Wind Beneath My Wings" and "Hero") is a 1982 song written by American songwriters Jeff Silbar and Larry Henley.

The song was first recorded by Australian singer Kamahl in 1982 for a country and western album he was recording. Kamahl talked about being the first to record the song in an appearance on Australian TV show Spicks and Specks but stated it was not commercially released because it was felt he did not suit the country and western style. Instead, Roger Whittaker recorded the song, as well as Sheena Easton and Lee Greenwood. The song appeared shortly thereafter in charted versions by Colleen Hewett (1982), Lou Rawls (1983), Gladys Knight & the Pips (1983) and Gary Morris (1983).

The highest-charting version of the song to date was recorded in 1988 by singer and actress Bette Midler for the soundtrack to the film Beaches. This version was released as a single in early 1989, spent one week at No. 1 on the US Billboard Hot 100 singles chart in June 1989, and won Grammy Awards for both Record of the Year and Song of the Year at the 32nd Annual Grammy Awards in February 1990. On October 24, 1991, Midler's single was also certified Platinum by the Recording Industry Association of America for shipment of one million copies in the United States. In 2004, Midler's version finished at No. 44 in AFI's 100 Years...100 Songs survey of top tunes in American cinema. Perry Como recorded the song for his final studio album Today, released by RCA Records in 1987. Como wanted "Wind Beneath My Wings" released as a single but RCA refused; Como was reportedly so angry he vowed never to record for RCA Records ever again.

In a 2002 UK poll, "Wind Beneath My Wings" was found to be the most-played song at British funerals.

== Background ==
Several years prior, Larry Henley had written a poem with the same title for his ex-wife. One day, when Henley and Jeff Silbar sat down to write a song for Bob Seger, Silbar saw that Henley had written that title on his legal pad and was inspired by those words to write the song. Apart from the title, the song did not incorporate any of the text of the original poem. Henley wrote the lyrics and Silbar wrote the music.

Silbar and Henley recorded a demo of the song, which they gave to musician Bob Montgomery. Montgomery then recorded his own demo version of the song, changing it from the mid-tempo version he was given to a ballad. Silbar and Henley then offered the song to many artists, which eventually resulted in Roger Whittaker becoming the first to release the song commercially. It appears on his 1982 studio album, also titled The Wind Beneath My Wings. The song was shortly thereafter recorded by Australian artist Colleen Hewett and released by Avenue Records in 1982. Hewitt's recording became the first version of the song to be issued as a single and to appear on a national chart, peaking at No. 52 on Australia's Kent Music Report chart.

The first year "Wind Beneath My Wings" appeared on a music industry trade publication chart in the United States was 1983. Singer Lou Rawls was the first to score a major hit with the song, as his version peaked at No. 10 on the Billboard Adult Contemporary chart, No. 60 on the Billboard Hot Black Singles chart and No. 65 on the main Billboard Hot 100 singles chart. Gladys Knight & the Pips also released a recording of the song in 1983 under the title "Hero" for their album Visions. Their version peaked at No. 64 on Billboard's Hot Black Singles chart while also reaching No. 23 on Billboard's Adult Contemporary chart. Singer Gary Morris released a country version of the song in 1983. Morris' version of the song peaked at No. 4 on Billboard's Hot Country Singles chart and later won both the Academy of Country Music Awards for Song of the Year at the 19th Academy of Country Music Awards and Country Music Association Award for Song of the Year at the 1984 Country Music Association Awards.

== Colleen Hewett version ==
"The Wind Beneath My Wings"

Single by Colleen Hewett

from the album Colleen
- B-side: "Constantly"
- Genre: Pop
- Label: Avenue
- Songwriters: Larry Henley, Jeff Silbar

Colleen Hewett recorded her version of the song in 1982 for her album Colleen. The arrangement for her version was written by David Hirschfelder. Hewett's keyboard player had a car accident on the way to the studio. Hirschfelder was outside one of the studios with a keyboard. He came in and wrote what Hewett described as an incredible arrangement. The song would become a hit for her. The song backed with "Constantly" was released in February 1983 on Avenue BA 223025. Making its way into the Australian charts, it first charted in Melbourne. It would eventually get to No. 19 in that city. It also got to No. 16 in Adelaide and No. 38 in Perth. It reached No. 52 nationally.

=== Charts ===
Chart (1983)	Peak position
Australia (Kent Music Report)	52

== Lou Rawls version ==
"The Wind Beneath My Wings"

Single by Lou Rawls

from the album When the Night Comes
- B-side: "Midnight Sunshine"
- Released: March 1983
- Genre: Soul
- Length: 3:53
- Label: Epic
- Songwriters: Larry Henley, Jeff Silbar
- Producer: Ron Haffkine

Lou Rawls singles chronology
"Let Me Show You How" (1982)	"The Wind Beneath My Wings" (1983)	"Upside Down" (1983)

Lou Rawls was the first to land the song on a music chart in the US. The up-tempo version by Rawls was released in March 1983 on Epic 34-03758. It was backed with "Midnight Sunshine". It appeared on his album When the Night Comes. It spent six weeks on the Billboard Hot 100 chart and on April 16, 1983, it peaked at no. 65. It also got to no. 60 on the R&B chart. Rawls once performed a twelve-minute live version of the song at a concert in Elgin, Illinois.

=== Charts ===
Chart (1983)	Peak position
Canada Adult Contemporary (RPM)	8
US Billboard Hot 100	65
US Adult Contemporary (Billboard)	10
US Hot Black Singles (Billboard)	60

== Gary Morris version ==
"The Wind Beneath My Wings"

Single by Gary Morris

from the album Why Lady Why
- B-side: "The Way I Love You Tonight"
- Released: August 6, 1983
- Length: 4:40
- Label: Warner Bros.
- Songwriters: Larry Henley, Jeff Silbar
- Producer: Jimmy Bowen

Gary Morris singles chronology
"The Love She Found in Me" (1983)	"The Wind Beneath My Wings" (1983)	"Why Lady Why" (1983)

"Wind Beneath My Wings" was recorded by American country music artist Gary Morris for his album Why Lady Why and reached the Top 10 of the Billboard Hot Country Singles chart. It was named Song of the Year by both the Academy of Country Music and the Country Music Association.

=== Charts ===
Chart (1983)	Peak position
US Hot Country Songs (Billboard)	4
Canada Country Tracks (RPM)	10

== Bette Midler version ==
"Wind Beneath My Wings"

Single by Bette Midler

from the album Beaches: Original Soundtrack Recording
- B-side: "Oh Industry"
- Released: February 1989
- Genre: Pop; soft rock
- Length: 4:54 (album and 7-inch version); 4:18 (edit)
- Label: Atlantic
- Songwriters: Larry Henley; Jeff Silbar
- Producer: Arif Mardin

Bette Midler singles chronology
"Under the Boardwalk" (1989)	"Wind Beneath My Wings" (1989)	"From a Distance" (1990)

Music video
- "Wind Beneath My Wings" on YouTube

"Wind Beneath My Wings" was performed by Bette Midler for the soundtrack of the 1988 film Beaches, starring Midler and Barbara Hershey. Marc Shaiman, Midler's longtime music arranger, was already a fan of the song and suggested it to her when they were identifying songs she could perform during the film. The song became a worldwide hit; it charted at No. 1 in the United States and Australia, No. 3 in Canada, and No. 5 in the UK. In the US, the song become Midler's first No. 1 and third top-10 hit on the Billboard Hot 100. The song received the awards for Record of the Year and Song of the Year at the 32nd Annual Grammy Awards in 1990.

=== Critical reception ===
AllMusic editor Heather Phares said that Midler turned this "inspirational love song" into "an epic pop song", noting her "demonstrative interpretation". Dennis Hunt from Los Angeles Times felt it was "unabashedly sentimental". In his review of the Beaches soundtrack, Stephen Holden from The New York Times remarked that "one is reminded of just how powerful a pop singer Ms. Midler can be when handed the right song and an arrangement that doesn't constrict her brash, larger-than-life personality." He added that "the most effective numbers are dramatic ballads" like "Wind Beneath My Wings".

A reviewer from People magazine wrote that the song "articulates the movie's theme of enduring friendship, and Midler's heartfelt delivery conveys the message a lot more succinctly and satisfyingly than the film." British outlet The Stage noted that the song, "a cabaret favourite for several years now", has been "given a new lease of life because it has been recorded by Bette Midler." John Louie from The Stanford Daily called it a "sweet, melodious ballad".

=== Music video ===
The accompanying music video for "Wind Beneath My Wings" was made in black-and-white. It opens with a light-haired girl meeting a lonely dark-haired girl under the dock on a beach. They befriend each other and walk along the beach together. Occasionally throughout the video, Midler performs on a stage, dressed in a black dress and long curly hair. Her arms are crossed. The girls dance on the beach until the dark-haired finds a long stick, which she writes in the sand with. The light-haired girl continues to dance alone. Toward the end, the dark-haired girl drops to the sand and starts digging in it. She finds a doll buried in the sand and pushes it to her chest. As the video ends, the light-haired girl goes beyond the horizon.

== Live performances ==
In the days following the September 11 attacks in 2001, Midler performed the song live at the Prayer for America memorial service held at Yankee Stadium. In 2014, Midler performed the song following the annual in memoriam montage at the 86th Academy Awards.

=== Track listings ===
- 7-inch, US (Atlantic 7-88972)
- Cassette, US (Atlantic 4-88972)
- Mini-CD, Japan (Atlantic 09P3-6159)
1. "Wind Beneath My Wings" – 4:54
2. "Oh Industry" – 4:05
- 7-inch, UK (Atlantic A8972)
1. "Wind Beneath My Wings" (edit)
2. "Oh Industry"
- 12-inch, UK (Atlantic A8972T)
- Mini-CD, Germany (Atlantic A8972CD)
1. "Wind Beneath My Wings"
2. "Oh Industry"
3. "I Think It's Going to Rain Today"
- 1996 CD, Germany (Atlantic 7567 85481 2)
1. "Wind Beneath My Wings"
2. "From a Distance"
3. "In My Life"
4. "To Deserve You"

=== Charts ===
==== Weekly charts ====
Chart (1989)	Peak position
Australia (ARIA)	1
Canada Top Singles (RPM)	3
Europe (Eurochart Hot 100)	21
Iceland (Íslenski Listinn Topp 10)	2
Ireland (IRMA)	4
Luxembourg (Radio Luxembourg)	3
New Zealand (Recorded Music NZ)	4
UK Singles (Official Charts)	5
US Billboard Hot 100	1
US Adult Contemporary (Billboard)	2

Chart (1996)	Peak position
Netherlands (Single Top 100 Tipparade)	8

==== Year-end charts ====
Chart (1989)	Position
Australia (ARIA)	11
Canada Top Singles (RPM)	31
New Zealand (RIANZ)	45
UK Singles (OCC)	72
US Billboard Hot 100	7
US Adult Contemporary (Billboard)	4

=== Certifications ===
Region	Certification	Certified units/sales
Australia (ARIA)	Platinum	70,000^{^}
New Zealand (RMNZ)	Gold	15,000^{‡}
United Kingdom (BPI)	Platinum	600,000^{‡}
United States (RIAA)	Platinum	1,000,000^{^}
^{^} Shipments figures based on certification alone.^{‡} Sales+streaming figures based on certification alone.

=== Release history ===
Region	Date	Format(s)	Label(s)	Ref.
United States	February 1989	7-inch vinyl; cassette	Atlantic	
United Kingdom	June 5, 1989	7-inch vinyl; 12-inch vinyl	Atlantic	
Japan	June 10, 1989	Mini-CD	Atlantic	

== Other versions ==
In the 1990s, two English actor/singers released their versions as singles. Bill Tarmey's version in 1993, from his debut album A Gift of Love, reached No. 40 on the UK Singles Chart, while Steven Houghton's version, from his self-titled debut album, reached No. 3 in 1997 and No. 21 in Ireland.

In 2001, the Finnish power metal band Sonata Arctica recorded a cover of the song and it was released in their second EP Orientation. Later in 2003 it was also included in the compilation Takatalvi.

In 2009, Belgian-Canadian singer and songwriter Lara Fabian recorded a version of the song on her album of acoustic cover versions of songs by female singers, Every Woman in Me.

Idina Menzel sang "Wind Beneath My Wings" as a duet with Kristen Bell at her successful audition for the 2013 film Frozen. She sang it again for the 2017 film Beaches, a remake of the same film in which Bette Midler's version of the song was featured.
