= David Lynn Jones =

American country music singer-songwriter (born 1950)

- Born: January 15, 1950 (age 76)
- Origin: Bexar, Arkansas, United States
- Genres: Country
- Occupation: Singer-songwriter
- Instrument: Vocals
- Years active: 1987–1994
- Labels: Mercury, Liberty

David Lynn Jones (born January 15, 1950) is an American country music singer-songwriter. Between 1987 and 1994, Jones released four studio albums. He also charted four singles on Billboard Hot Country Singles & Tracks chart. His highest charting single, "Bonnie Jean (Little Sister)," peaked at number ten in 1987.

== Biography ==
David Lynn Jones was born January 15, 1950, in Bexar, Arkansas. In the 1970s, he played bass in a local band called Freddy Morrison & the Bandana Blues, and had a minor songwriting success with Randy Cornor's hit "Heart Don't Fail Me Now". By 1986, Jones had also written "Living in the Promiseland", a No. 1 single on the Hot Country Songs charts for Willie Nelson. He also recorded the song's demo and played all but one instrument on it. Nelson also recorded another one of Jones's songs, "When Times Were Good", with Merle Haggard on their 1987 duet album Seashores of Old Mexico.

Mercury Records signed Jones in 1987 and released his debut album Hard Times on Easy Street that year. The album included ten tracks, all written by Jones. Lead single "Bonnie Jean (Little Sister)" charted at No. 10 on Hot Country Songs. Three more singles made the charts: "High Ridin' Heroes" (a duet with Waylon Jennings), "The Rogue", and "Tonight in America". Jones wrote all ten of the songs on the album, including his own rendition of "Living in the Promiseland", and co-produced it with Richie Albright and Mick Ronson.

A second album, Wood, Wind and Stone, followed in 1990. This album featured a more pop music oriented sound than its predecessor. He also recorded two albums for Liberty Records: Mixed Emotions in 1992 and Play by Ear two years later. By the end of the decade, he worked as a writer for Blue Water Music, in addition to running a recording studio in Bexar.

Jones was the victim of a case of identity theft in the early 2000s, which made releasing additional albums difficult for fear that any royalty checks would be stolen by the perpetrators. In 2017 Jones won a $2.1 million judgment against a local bank after the jury found that the bank had sold the master tapes to over 100 of his songs and recording equipment "without permission or cause" at a public auction.

== Musical styles and reception ==
Jones cited Waylon Jennings and Kris Kristofferson as his main musical influences. A 1989 article in Cash Box stated that his first album "told stories of his life on the road, stories about his family, and about learning some of life’s lessons." "Bonnie Jean" was written about Jones's sister, a truck driver, and the single "High Ridin' Heroes" was about a rodeo rider that Jones knew.

Thom Owens of Allmusic wrote that Hard Times on Easy Street "showcases a talent that arrived fully formed. Though Jones doesn't push any musical boundaries, his ear for straight-forwards, rock-inflected rootsy country is impeccable". Cash Box also praised Mixed Emotions, with an uncredited review stating that it "offers a kaleidoscope of meaning in each cut".

== Discography ==
=== Albums ===
Title	Album details	Peak positions
Title	Album details	US Country
Hard Times on Easy Street	Release date: 1987; Label: Mercury Records	28
Wood, Wind and Stone	Release date: 1990; Label: Mercury Records	66
Mixed Emotions	Release date: May 5, 1992; Label: Liberty Records	—
Play by Ear	Release date: April 5, 1994; Label: Liberty Records	—
"—" denotes releases that did not chart

=== Singles ===
Year	Single	Peak positions		Album
Year	Single	US Country	CAN Country	Album
1987	"Bonnie Jean (Little Sister)"	10	9	Hard Times on Easy Street
1988	"High Ridin' Heroes" (with Waylon Jennings)	14	12	Hard Times on Easy Street
1988	"The Rogue"	36	66	Hard Times on Easy Street
1988	"Tonight in America"	66	—	Hard Times on Easy Street
1990	"Lonely Town"	— (Note: "Lonely Town" did not chart on Hot Country Songs, but peaked at No. 1 on Hot Country Radio Breakouts.)	—	Wood, Wind and Stone
1990	"When Times Were Good"	—	—	Wood, Wind and Stone
1990	"I Feel a Change Comin' On"	—	—	Wood, Wind and Stone
1992	"Her Love Don't Lie"	—	—	Mixed Emotions
1992	"Louise"	—	—	Mixed Emotions
"—" denotes releases that did not chart

=== Music videos ===
Year	Video
1987	"Bonnie Jean (Little Sister)"
1988	"High Ridin' Heroes" (with Waylon Jennings)
1988	"Tonight in America"
1990	"Lonely Town"
1990	"I Feel a Change Comin On"
