= I'll Never Stop Loving You (Gary Morris song) =

Single by Gary Morris

from the album Anything Goes
- B-side: "Heaven's Hell Without You"
- Released: July 1985
- Genre: Country
- Length: 3:40
- Label: Warner Bros.
- Songwriter(s): Dave Loggins; J.D. Martin
- Producer(s): Jim Ed Norman

Gary Morris singles chronology
| "Lasso the Moon" (1985) | "I'll Never Stop Loving You" (1985) | "Wildflower" (1985) |

"I'll Never Stop Loving You" is a song written by Dave Loggins and J.D. Martin, and recorded by American country music artist Gary Morris. It was released in July 1985 as the first single from the album Anything Goes. The song was Morris' second number one country hit. The single went to number one for one week and spent a total of fifteen weeks on the country chart.

== Chart performance ==
| Chart (1985) | Peak position |
|---|---|
| US Hot Country Songs (Billboard) | 1 |
| Canadian RPM Country Tracks | 1 |
