= Gary Morris =

American musician (born 1948)

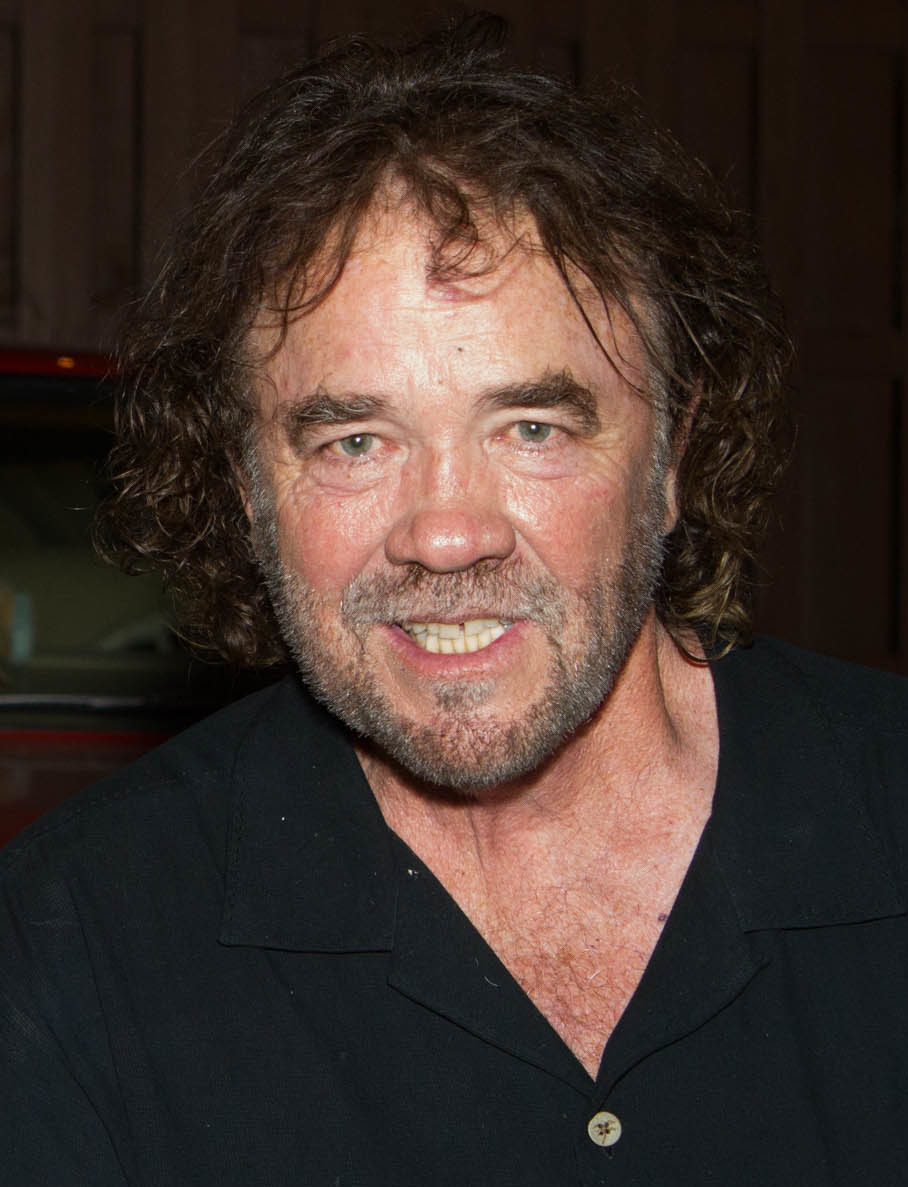
- Morris in 2014

Background information
- Born: Gary Gwyn Morris; December 7, 1948 (age 77); Fort Worth, Texas, U.S.
- Origin: North Richland Hills, Texas
- Genres: Country, progressive country
- Occupations: Singer, actor
- Years active: 1981–present
- Labels: Warner Bros.; Capitol; Liberty; Universal
- Website: garymorrismusic.com

Gary Gwyn Morris (born December 7, 1948) is an American singer and stage actor who charted a string of hits on the country music charts throughout the 1980s.

Morris is known for the 1983 ballad "The Wind Beneath My Wings", although his credits include more than twenty-five other chart singles on the Billboard country charts, including five No. 1 hits. He has also released nine studio albums, mostly in the country pop vein, with his 1983 album Why Lady Why having earned a gold certification from the RIAA.

== Early life ==
Morris was born in Fort Worth, Texas. He has two siblings, a twin sister, Carey, and a younger brother, Mark. Even though Morris was best known for pop-oriented hits in the 1980s, he was descended from a long line of traditional country singers, who sang hard-twang country and also gospel.

Gary's family moved from Fort Worth to North Richland Hills, Texas in the late 1950s. Morris, a good athlete, played four sports at Richland High School, which led to a scholarship with Cisco Junior College in Texas. It was during college that singing became Morris's chosen vocation, and he decided to move to Colorado. He and his two friends formed a trio, and asked a Colorado Springs bartender if they could get up on the bandstand and perform a few songs, and the audience's response (and tips) convinced Morris to put his college plans on hold and to pursue a performing career.

In the early 1970s, Morris made a living by singing in nightclubs in Denver, Colorado. He also wrote a few commercial jingles for Frontier Airlines. In 1976, Morris signed on with Jimmy Carter's presidential campaign and sang at fundraisers during Carter's campaign. This job led to Morris' performing at the White House following Carter's election. In the audience was Nashville country music producer Norro Wilson, to whom Morris later gave a demo tape. Wilson liked what he heard, and soon signed Morris to his label Warner Bros. Records.

== Recording career ==
Morris signed his recording contract with Warner Bros. in 1980. After a pair of minor hits landed just inside the top 40 of the Billboard Hot Country Singles chart, he scored his breakthrough hit with "Headed for a Heartache"; that song reached No. 8 on the country chart in late 1981. Two follow-up singles also reached the top 15.

Morris' 1983 album, Why Lady Why focused more on ballads. One of the album's four singles was "Wind Beneath My Wings", which showcased Morris' soaring tenor. Written by Larry Henley and Jeff Silbar, the song about heroes — which Morris recorded as a ballad — became one of the earliest hit versions of the song; a better-known version by Bette Midler would top the Billboard Hot 100 in 1989. The Why Lady Why album also featured the ballad "The Love She Found in Me", the mid-tempoed "Velvet Chains" and the up-tempoed title track as singles; all of them peaked in the top 10 of the Billboard Hot Country Singles chart. Also during this time, Morris recorded a duet with Lynn Anderson called "You're Welcome to Tonight", which became a top 10 hit.

After two more top 10 hits in 1984 — "Between Two Fires" and "Second Hand Heart" — Morris scored his first No. 1 country hit in March 1985 with "Baby Bye Bye". During what was his most prolific hitmaking part of his career, Morris had three more solo No. 1 hits during the next two years: "I'll Never Stop Loving You", "100% Chance of Rain" and "Leave Me Lonely". He also recorded a chart-topping duet with Crystal Gayle, "Makin' Up For Lost Time (The Dallas Lovers Song)". Although he rarely saw any success outside country music, many of Morris' hit songs were in the pop-country vein during the height of his career.

Morris had two more hits in 1987: the solo "Plain Brown Wrapper" and another duet with Gayle called "Another World". The latter song was used for almost a decade as the theme song for the NBC soap opera. After that, Morris' success on the country charts began to fade, as tastes switched once again to neo-traditional country music. Morris later opened a music publishing office in Nashville, with one of his employees being future star Faith Hill.

In early 2008, Morris released two gospel albums. His most recent CD is called, Faith and Freedom, dedicated to the military troops. Gary Morris performed two songs featured on Juice Newton's album Duets: Friends & Memories, which was released in October 2010.

== Acting career ==
Morris took a break from touring to pursue a serious acting career. One of his first big roles was in the Broadway production of Les Misérables, as Jean Valjean. The full symphonic recording of Les Misérables is a platinum-selling, Grammy Award-winning album and features Morris' vocals throughout in the role of Valjean, including his version of the song "Bring Him Home". Morris has also appeared in a production of Puccini's opera La Boheme with fellow country/pop singer Linda Ronstadt.

In the 1980s, he did a stint on The Colbys as blind country music singer Wayne Masterson, signed to Dominique Deveraux's label. On the show, he sang "Try Gettin' Over You" from his Anything Goes release.

In the 1990s, he spent a great deal of time working on music projects, such as the PBS special concert production, in Moscow, Russia, in the Tretyakov Gallery. He returned to country music in the 1990s, performing in concerts and as a record producer. Morris hosted and also produced TNN’s The North American Sportsman. In 1992, he appeared in an episode of Designing Women as Julia's surgeon.

== Awards and nominations ==
=== American Music Awards ===
Year	Nominee / work	Award	Result
1987	Gary Morris	Favorite Country Male Video Artist	Nominated

=== Music City News Country Awards ===
Year	Nominee / work	Award	Result
1984	Gary Morris	Star of Tomorrow	Nominated
1985	Gary Morris	Male Artist of the Year	Nominated
1986	Gary Morris	Male Artist of the Year	Nominated

=== Academy of Country Music Awards ===
Year	Nominee / work	Award	Result
1983	Gary Morris	Top New Male Vocalist	Nominated
1984	"Wind Beneath My Wings"	Song of the Year	Won
1985	Gary Morris	Top Male Vocalist of the Year	Nominated
1985	"Second Hand Heart"	Song of the Year	Nominated
1985	"Second Hand Heart"	Video of the Year	Nominated
1986	Gary Morris	Top Male Vocalist of the Year	Nominated
1986	"I'll Never Stop Loving You"	Song of the Year	Nominated
1986	Crystal Gayle and Gary Morris	Top Vocal Duo of the Year	Nominated
1987	Crystal Gayle and Gary Morris	Top Vocal Duo of the Year	Nominated
1987	"100% Chance of Rain"	Video of the Year	Nominated
1988	Crystal Gayle and Gary Morris	Top Vocal Duo of the Year	Nominated

=== Country Music Association Awards ===
Year	Nominee / work	Award	Result
1984	Gary Morris	Male Vocalist of the Year	Nominated
1985	Gary Morris	Male Vocalist of the Year	Nominated
1985	"Second Hand Heart"	Music Video of the Year	Nominated
1986	"100% Chance of Rain"	Music Video of the Year	Nominated
1986	Gary Morris	Male Vocalist of the Year	Nominated
1986	Gary Morris and Crystal Gayle	Vocal Duo of the Year	Nominated
1987	Gary Morris and Crystal Gayle	Vocal Duo of the Year	Nominated
