= Is This Heaven? =

EP by Stella Lefty
- Released: May 15, 2026
- Genres: Country pop; indie folk
- Length: 15:27
- Label: Atlantic Outpost
- Producers: Joe Reeves; Grace Enger; Hoskins

Stella Lefty chronology
Tragic, Really (2025)	Is This Heaven? (2026)	Long Way Home (2026)

Is This Heaven? is the second extended play by American singer-songwriter Stella Lefty. It was released on May 15, 2026, through Atlantic Outpost. The ep generally received positive reviews, with critics praising its strong pop, country, and folk production.

Upon release, the EP debuted at number six on the Billboard Top Country Albums chart and number twenty-four on the US Billboard 200.

== Background and release ==
Before Is This Heaven?, Stella Lefty had released several songs independently. Shortly thereafter, she signed with the country music imprint of Atlantic Records, known as Atlantic Outpost. She began writing the EP during the same period.

Lefty performing "Boston"

According to Lefty, the title was taken from a line in the 1989 film Field of Dreams, which she described as her favorite film. She also references the title through her experiences performing songs from the EP and observing how listeners respond to them.

The EP was released on May 15, 2026 and contains six tracks. It includes the previously released songs alongside "Something to Lose", featuring Vincent Mason, "Why Wouldn't We", and "Boston".

The cover artwork features a photograph of Lefty by Cris Slater and Geoff Mau.

== Critical reception ==
Is This Heaven? received positive reviews from music publications. Writing for Music & Gigs, Sophie Graham scored Is This Heaven? 4 out of 5 stars and praised the EP for its consistency, highlighting "I Know I Know" for its directness and emotional clarity and calling "Slow Dancin" the EP's hidden gem. Graham also praised "Boston", noting that the song fits naturally with the rest of the EP rather than feeling like a hit single added to an otherwise unrelated collection. MusiFlo's praised the EP's melodies, vocals and lyrics. The reviewer described the songs as combining traditional and contemporary country influences and singled out "Something to Lose", "Boston", "Slow Dancin'" and "Thinking 'bout You" for their arrangements and melodies. The review also praised Leftys range and the duet with Vincent Mason, on "Something to Lose". Alex Teitz of FEMMUSIC Magazine described the EP as exploring nostalgia and the early stages of romantic relationships. In contrast, The Juice Box Press's Nathan Smith calls the EP a "breath of fresh air" in country music and praises its consistency and mixture of country, pop and folk. Smith also noted that its short length leaves room for a future full-length release to explore more.

== Commercial performance ==
Is This Heaven? debuted at number six on the Billboard Top Country Albums chart, making Lefty the first woman to earn an initial top-10 entry on the chart in 2026 at the time.

== Track listing ==
Credits adapted from the album's liner notes and digital release.

Is This Heaven? track listing
No.	Title	Writer(s)	Producer(s)	Length
1.	"Something to Lose" (featuring Vincent Mason)	Stella Lefty; Grace Enger; Joe Harvey Whyte; Luke Dick; Jon Decious	Joe Reeves	2:55
2.	"Why Wouldn't We"	Stella Lefty; Grace Enger; Grady Block; Emily Weisband	Joe Reeves; Grady Block	2:37
3.	"I Know I Know"	Stella Lefty; Grace Enger; Joe Harvey Whyte; Matt Combs	Joe Reeves	2:39
4.	"Boston"	Stella Lefty; Joe Reeves; Joe Harvey Whyte; Jacob Kasher Hindlin; Noah Kahan	Joe Reeves	2:51
5.	"Slow Dancin'"	Stella Lefty; Grace Enger	Joe Reeves; Grace Enger	2:04
6.	"Thinking 'bout You"	Stella Lefty; Grace Enger; Hoskins; Sadie Jean	Joe Reeves; Grace Enger; Hoskins	2:21
Total length:				15:27

=== Notes ===
- "Boston" contains a sample of "Stick Season", written and performed by Noah Kahan.

== Charts ==
Chart performance for Is This Heaven?
Chart (2026)	Peak position
Australian Albums (ARIA)	21
Canadian Albums (Billboard)	16
New Zealand Albums (RMNZ)	27
US Billboard 200	24
US Top Country Albums (Billboard)	6
