= Boston (Stella Lefty song) =

Single by Stella Lefty

from the album Long Way Home
- Released: March 27, 2026
- Genre: Country pop
- Length: 2:50
- Label: Atlantic Outpost
- Songwriters: Stella Lefty; Grace Enger; Jacob Kasher Hindlin; Joe Reeves; Noah Kahan
- Producer: Joe Reeves

Stella Lefty singles chronology
"The Kill" (2026)	"Boston" (2026)	"I Know I Know" (2026)

Lyric video
- "Boston" on YouTube

Music video
- "Boston" on YouTube

"Boston" is a song by American singer-songwriter Stella Lefty. It was released on March 27, 2026, through Atlantic Outpost as a single from her EP Is This Heaven? and was later included on her debut studio album, Long Way Home (2026). Lefty wrote the song with Grace Enger, Jacob Kasher Hindlin, and Joe Reeves; Noah Kahan is also credited as a songwriter because the chorus interpolates the melody of his 2022 single "Stick Season".

The song became Lefty's breakout hit after an unfinished excerpt gained popularity on TikTok. It debuted at number 95 on the US Billboard Hot 100, becoming her first entry on the chart, and later peaked at number two. It also reached the top five in Australia, Canada, New Zealand and the United Kingdom and topped the Canadian country, UK Country Airplay, and US Country Airplay charts.

== Background and writing ==
Lefty wrote "Boston" shortly after beginning a relationship with fellow country singer Vincent Mason. In an August 2026 interview with Vanity Fair, Lefty said the song was written during the first week of their relationship and was about Mason.

The chorus originated during a writing trip to Nashville, Tennessee, while Lefty was waiting for Mason, then a new romantic interest, to pick her up. Lefty began playing the piano during her downtime and developed the song's chorus. At the time, Boston was already on her mind because she was scheduled to perform at the city's House of Blues while opening for Cameron Whitcomb and because one of her friends in Los Angeles was from Boston.

Lefty later noted that the piano on which she began writing the song had the name "Boston" printed on its side, although she said she had not noticed the name while composing it. She completed the verses approximately a week after writing the chorus. Lefty cited traditional and contemporary country artists including Randy Travis, Keith Whitley, Brad Paisley, and Tim McGraw as influences on her writing at the time.

== Composition and lyrics ==
"Boston" is a country pop song centered on a narrator who is accustomed to avoiding serious romantic relationships but finds herself reconsidering that instinct after meeting someone who treats her well. The chorus depicts the couple traveling by train to Boston while acknowledging that their relationship is progressing unusually quickly.

The song reflects a recurring theme in Lefty's work of balancing independence with romantic attachment. In a review of Long Way Home, Entertainment Focus described "Boston" as capturing the tension between believing oneself to be "better alone" and discovering a reason to reconsider that position.

Musically, the chorus incorporates a melodic interpolation of Noah Kahan's "Stick Season". Lefty said she had not consciously been thinking about Kahan's song when she wrote "Boston". According to Lefty, listeners noticed the similarity after she posted the unfinished chorus online, and Kahan's representatives subsequently contacted her team. Lefty and her team agreed to give Kahan a songwriting credit before "Boston" was officially released.

Following the song's commercial success, social media users circulated older videos of Lefty performing covers of "Stick Season", prompting further discussion about whether the melodic resemblance was subconscious. Lefty has maintained that the resemblance was not intentional.

== Release and viral success ==
Before recording the completed version of "Boston", Lefty posted a video of herself performing part of its unfinished chorus on TikTok. At that point, she had written only approximately half of the chorus.

The clip began spreading beyond Lefty's own account as other TikTok users created videos using the song. Lefty later contrasted its growth with that of her earlier viral single "Thinking 'bout You", saying that although the original "Boston" posts did not necessarily receive the same number of views, she noticed significantly more users creating their own videos with the audio.

Lefty initially had reservations about the excerpt. She told Billboard Canada that she was not particularly attached to the version she had posted and did not immediately understand why listeners were responding to it. Several weeks later, she returned to the song and completed its verses, bridge and production, saying the finished recording changed her opinion of the track.

"Boston" was released as a single on March 27, 2026. It subsequently appeared on Lefty's May 2026 EP Is This Heaven? and her debut studio album Long Way Home, released on August 21, 2026.

== Commercial performance ==
"Boston" became Lefty's first single to chart on the US Billboard Hot 100, debuting at number 95 before steadily climbing the chart. By early June, it had reached number 20. The Boston Globe noted that it was only the third song explicitly titled "Boston" to enter the Hot 100, following Dave Loggins' "Please Come to Boston" and Augustana's "Boston".

The single continued rising through the summer and reached number two on the Hot 100 in August 2026. It remained at number two on the chart dated September 5, 2026. The song also became an international crossover hit, reaching number two in Canada, number four in Australia and the United Kingdom, and number five in New Zealand. It topped the Canadian country chart and the UK Country Airplay chart.

== Critical reception ==
Critical response to "Boston" was mixed, with reviewers frequently focusing on its catchiness and its musical similarity to "Stick Season".

Writing for Vanity Fair, Abigail Sylvor Greenberg characterized the song as an unusually effective earworm and noted that its chorus had become widely recognizable during the summer of 2026. Jason P. Frank of Vulture similarly described "Boston" as one of the year's defining hits and attributed its rise in part to TikTok, while noting that discussion surrounding the song increasingly centered on originality and the Kahan interpolation.

Hattie Lindert of Pitchfork was considerably more negative, criticizing the song as derivative and arguing that its strongest distinguishing feature was its resemblance to other contemporary country-pop songs, particularly "Stick Season". The publication also compared elements of the song to Ella Langley's "Choosin' Texas".

The similarity to Kahan's work became a recurring part of coverage of the song after its release. Vulture reported that archival videos of Lefty covering "Stick Season" circulated online after she discussed the interpolation, intensifying debate about whether the resemblance was intentional or the result of unconscious influence. Lefty has consistently said that she did not deliberately model "Boston" on Kahan's song.

== Charts ==
=== Weekly charts ===
Weekly chart performance
Chart (2026)	Peak position
Australia (ARIA)	4
Australia Airplay (RCS)	8
Austria Airplay (MusicTrace)	33
Belgium (Ultratop 50 Flanders)	1
Canada (Canadian Hot 100)	2
Canada AC (Billboard)	28
Canada CHR/Top 40 (Billboard)	33
Canada Country (Billboard)	1
Canada Hot AC (Billboard)	23
Colombia Anglo Airplay (Monitor Latino)	13
Costa Rica Anglo Airplay (Monitor Latino)	11
Croatia International Airplay (Top lista)	87
Denmark Airplay (Tracklisten)	3
Estonia Airplay (TopHit)	48
Germany Airplay (MusicTrace)	25
Global 200 (Billboard)	10
Ireland (IRMA)	8
Jamaica Airplay (JAMMS)	6
Latvia Airplay (LaIPA)	20
Malta Airplay (Radiomonitor)	4
Netherlands (Dutch Top 40)	6
Netherlands (Single Top 100)	13
Netherlands Airplay (Dutch Charts)	1
New Zealand (Recorded Music NZ)	5
North Macedonia Airplay (Radiomonitor)	17
Norway (VG-lista)	54
Norway Airplay (IFPI)	7
Slovenia Airplay (Radiomonitor)	9
South Africa Airplay (TOSAC)	7
Sweden (Sverigetopplistan)	42
Switzerland (Schweizer Hitparade)	55
UK Singles (Official Charts)	3
UK Country Airplay (Radiomonitor)	1
Uruguay Anglo Airplay (Monitor Latino)	10
US Billboard Hot 100	2
US Adult Contemporary (Billboard)	17
US Adult Pop Airplay (Billboard)	8
US Country Airplay (Billboard)	1
US Hot Country Songs (Billboard)	2
US Pop Airplay (Billboard)	10
Venezuela Anglo Airplay (Monitor Latino)	11

=== Monthly charts ===
Monthly chart performance
Chart (2026)	Peak position
Estonia Airplay (TopHit)	50

== Certifications ==
Certifications for "Boston"
Region	Certification	Certified units/sales
Australia (ARIA)	Platinum	70,000^{‡}
Canada (Music Canada)	3× Platinum	240,000^{‡}
New Zealand (RMNZ)	Platinum	30,000^{‡}
United Kingdom (BPI)	Gold	400,000^{‡}
United States (RIAA)	Platinum	1,000,000^{‡}
^{‡} Sales+streaming figures based on certification alone.

== Release history ==
Release dates and formats for "Boston"
Region	Date	Format	Label(s)	Ref.
United States	April 27, 2026	Country radio	Atlantic	
United States	July 14, 2026	Contemporary hit radio	Atlantic	
