= Scream 7 (soundtrack) =

2026 film soundtrack album

Scream 7 (Original Motion Picture Soundtrack)

Film score by Marco Beltrami
- Released: May 22, 2026
- Recorded: 2025
- Genre: Film score
- Length: 50:45
- Label: Lakeshore
- Producer: Marco Beltrami

Marco Beltrami chronology
Deaf President Now! (2025)	Scream 7 (Original Motion Picture Soundtrack) (2026)	The Truth and Tragedy of Moriah Wilson (2026)

Scream 7 (Original Motion Picture Soundtrack) is the film score to the 2026 slasher film Scream 7 written and directed by Kevin Williamson. The film is the sequel to Scream VI (2023) and the seventh installment in the Scream franchise. It is scored by franchise veteran Marco Beltrami, who returned from Scream 4 (2011). The soundtrack accompanied 24 tracks, which featured newer themes along with existing material from previous films, which were incorporated and reinterpreted for this film. It was released through Lakeshore Records on May 22, 2026, three months after the film's release.

== Background ==
In April 2025, recurring franchise composer Marco Beltrami returned to score music for Scream 7. He previously scored the first four films, but was not involved in the fifth and sixth instalment, primarily because of Matt Bettinelli-Olpin and Tyler Gillett taking over the directorial duties and chose their collaborator Brian Tyler for those film. Beltrami's return was largely influenced due to Kevin Williamson, the screenwriter of the first four films, contacted him as he took over the directorial duties. He eventually returned to that project, as it would likely return to the original world that Wes Craven created furthering his interest.

Beltrami recalled that he had not created a signature theme for Ghostface in his previous instalments, hence, he decided to create one for this film and then based his theme on the musical interval of a seventh, thereby creating two descending sevenths that served as a signature theme for Ghostface. The score was recorded in Budapest with the 60-piece member of the Budapest Scoring Orchestra performing.

Beltrami wrapped the recording sessions of the film in late-August 2025, and had further teased snippets from the compositions titled "What's In A Name" and "School Drama", newer themes created for the film. Besides, he also revisited several character themes, such as the franchise's classic theme "Sidney's Lament" which besides it recurring appearance, was also reinterpreted as "Mrs. Evans Lament" that reflected Sidney's married surname from Mark Evans, played by Joel McHale. Buck Sanders, Brandon Roberts and Angela R. Claverie provided additional music.

== Original songs ==
Scream 7 featured five original songs created for the film. The first of them, "Rearranging Scars" by Sueco, was released on February 13, 2026. Another single, "Twisting the Knife" by Ice Nine Kills featuring the cast member Mckenna Grace (also with David Arquette and Roger L. Jackson), was released on February 19, followed by "Creepin" by Don Toliver, which released on February 20. The fourth song, "The Kill" by Stella Lefty was released on February 26, and the last song, "Criminal" by Jessie Murph, the very next day.

== Release ==
The score was not made available upon its initial release. In mid-May 2026, Lakeshore Records announced that they would be distributing the original score soundtrack. It was eventually released on May 22, 2026.

== Reception ==
Filmtracks wrote "Beltrami's return to this realm provides a competent and enjoyable entry in the series but one limited by its inherent confines. This isn't the best genre music in existence, but with Beltrami's team providing the personality, it's comfortingly recognizable and effective." Jeremy Mathai of /Film wrote "the blaring score, composed by returning "Scream" veteran Marco Beltrami, is as obtrusive and obvious as it gets." Nick Schager of The Daily Beast wrote "long-time composer Marco Beltrami's half-hearted score seems bored by the third-rate shenanigans."

== Track listing ==
No.	Title	Length
1.	"The Magnificent Seventh"	1:58
2.	"Ghostfan"	2:35
3.	"Burning Down the House"	3:00
4.	"Sidney and Tatum"	0:46
5.	"Sid Gets to Work"	0:57
6.	"ScarFaceTime"	3:15
7.	"Sweep the House"	2:35
8.	"Ghostface vs Family"	3:40
9.	"Gale Force"	1:39
10.	"Media Matters"	1:03
11.	"Drive to Hospital"	1:05
12.	"Looney Bin Buds"	1:40
13.	"A.I. Aye Aye"	1:45
14.	"Pizza Hunt - Lucas on Tap"	4:56
15.	"Hide and Seek"	2:04
16.	"Ben Hurt"	0:59
17.	"Sid Vicious"	4:21
18.	"Sid Runs Home"	0:40
19.	"Don't Spoil It, Pt. 1"	4:38
20.	"Don't Spoil It, Pt. 2"	0:47
21.	"Don't Spoil It, Pt. 3"	1:57
22.	"No More Stormy Weathers"	1:12
23.	"What's in a Name?"	1:47
24.	"Mrs. Evans Lament"	1:26
Total length:		50:45

== Personnel ==
Credits adapted from Film Music Reporter:

- Music composer: Marco Beltrami
- Music producer: Buck Sanders
- Additional music: Brandon Roberts
- Music supervisor: Areli Quirarte
- Music editor: Angela Claverie
- Music preparation: JoAnn Kane Music Service
- Recording and mixing: Tyson Lozensky
- Conductor: Péter Illényi
- Orchestrations: William A. Boston, Rossano Galante, Mark Graham, Trevor Motycka, Vincent Oppido
- Orchestra recording studio: Budapest Scoring
- Orchestra recording engineers: Dénes Rédly, Patrik Veréb
- Orchestra contractor: Bálint Sapszon
- Orchestra coordinator: Bertalan Veer
- Vocal recording engineer: Matthew Schickele
- Vocal solos by: Rose Thomson
- Studio assistants: Marcell Rokosz, Marton Novak
- Librarians: Katalin Réti, Ágnes Sapszon
- Music consultant: Rob Lowry
- Music coordinator: Mia Riggins

== Accolades ==
Award	Date of ceremony	Category	Nominee(s)	Result	Ref.
Hollywood Music in Media Awards	November 18, 2026	Best Original Score – Horror/Thriller Film	Steven Price	Nominated	

== See also ==
- Music of the Scream franchise
