= Long Way Home (Stella Lefty album) =

Studio album by Stella Lefty
- Released: August 21, 2026
- Recorded: 2025–2026
- Studios: Joe Reeves' home studio, Los Angeles
- Genres: Country pop; indie folk
- Length: 38:01
- Label: Atlantic Outpost
- Producers: Grace Enger; Hoskins; Connor McDonough; Riley McDonough; Joe Reeves; Konrad Snyder; Grady Block; Brett Truitt

Stella Lefty chronology
Is This Heaven? (2026)	Long Way Home (2026)

Singles from Long Way Home
- 1. "Boston" Released: March 27, 2026; 2. "I Know, I Know" Released: May 1, 2026; 3. "Something to Lose" Released: September 28, 2026

Long Way Home is the debut studio album by American singer-songwriter Stella Lefty. It was released on August 21, 2026, by Atlantic Outpost. The album contains all six songs previously released on Lefty's second extended play, Is This Heaven? (2026), plus eight new songs written especially for the release. The album also features a guest appearance by Vincent Mason.

The album was produced by Joe Reeves, Grace Enger, Hoskins, Connor McDonough and Riley McDonough, Brett Truitt, Grady Block and Konrad Snyder. Reeves, who had previously produced Lefty's breakout single "Boston", also worked as in-house producer for the album. The album will be promoted by the Long Way Home Tour, a North American concert tour scheduled for 2027, during which Lefty will perform songs from the album.

The album received generally negative reviews from music critics, who criticized its production, songwriting, and Lefty's vocal performance. It debuted at number 10 on the ARIA Charts, number 9 on the Official Aotearoa Music Charts, and number 77 on the UK Albums Chart, becoming Lefty's first album to chart in the United Kingdom. In the United States, it reached number 11 on the Billboard 200 and number 4 on the Top Country Albums chart. In Canada, it reached number 8 on the Billboard Canadian Albums chart.

The album was also subject to plagiarism allegations concerning several of its songs. At the 2026 MTV Video Music Awards, Stella Lefty received a nomination for Best Country for "Boston".

== Background and production ==
Following the release of her 2025 EP Tragic, Really, Lefty began moving away from her pop sound and toward country music. She had grown up listening to country and began focusing on the genre in December 2025. During this period, she continued writing with Grace Enger and Joe Reeves, who became regular collaborators.

She spent much of 2025 and 2026 releasing singles and building an audience. She initially released music independently before signing with Atlantic Outpost, Atlantic Records' country imprint, shortly after her song "The Kill" was featured in the film Scream 7. Her single "Boston", which includes parts of Noah Kahan's "Stick Season", entered the Billboard Hot 100 in 2026 and continued climbing over the following months, reaching the top five. The song's success came after the release of her EP Is This Heaven?.

On August 3, 2026, Lefty announced the album during her debut live performance at Lollapalooza in Chicago, telling the audience that the album was about returning to where her journey began. She described the album as reflecting the uncertainty of early relationships as well as her own experience of finding her direction as a new artist. Long Way Home contains 14 songs, seven of which had been released before the album. The previously released songs include songs from the Is This Heaven? EP as well as "The Kill". The album also includes seven songs that had not been previously released.

The album was produced by Joe Reeves, Grace Enger, Hoskins, Connor McDonough and Riley McDonough, Brett Truitt, Grady Block and Konrad Snyder. Reeves handled production on several tracks and also contributed instrumentation and programming. He worked as an engineer and producer on the song "Boston", which Lefty finished in Los Angeles with Reeves and Enger.

== Title and artwork ==
The cover artwork recreates a childhood photograph of Lefty, with her wearing a yellow bandana and a white tank top similar to those in the original image. The cover artwork reflects the album's themes of Lefty's upbringing and her return to her roots. In a review of the album, The Guardian described the cover artwork as depicting Lefty "mugging in a bandanna" and questioned the extent to which her identity as an artist had been shaped by music executives.

Photography and design for the album campaign was handled by Jack Balaban, with Shaina Stein serving as creative director.

According to TotalNtertainment, the title Long Way Home reflects the pop-country influences that shaped Lefty while growing up. She announced the album at her performance at Lollapalooza in Chicago, a festival she had attended since she was 15. Lefty and her band wore jerseys with "Long Way Home" printed across the front during the performance.

== Composition ==
Long Way Home combines pop songwriting with elements of country music. The album deals mainly with love, relationships, and heartbreak, with songs that include references to drinking whiskey, dancing at bars, and leaving town. "Forever Guy" deals with a low point, while "Lean In, Kiss Me" takes a more upbeat approach.

Lefty worked with Enger and Joe Reeves on much of the album, while Jacob Kasher Hindlin also contributed as a songwriter and producer. "Thinking 'bout You" was written by Lefty and Enger during a writing session at Enger's home. "Boston" was written shortly after Lefty met singer Vincent Mason in Nashville and was inspired by the beginning of their relationship. Mason also appears on a song on the album, which the two performed as a duet.

Other songs on the album include "Good at Leaving" and "I Know I Know", which deal with relationships from different perspectives.

== Release and promotion ==
Lefty announced her debut studio album, Long Way Home, during her debut performance at Lollapalooza in August 2026, and also announced "Lean In, Kiss Me" as the album's lead single, which was released on August 7, 2026. Long Way Home was released on August 21, 2026 through Atlantic Outpost. Lefty supported the release with in-store appearances and pop-up events in several U.S. cities, and was scheduled to make her Grand Ole Opry debut on September 2, 2026.

Following her Lollapalooza performance, Lefty continued with festival appearances in North America and Australia before beginning a series of headline shows in October and November. The tour included dates in cities such as Los Angeles, Phoenix, Dallas, and Toronto.

=== Singles and music videos ===
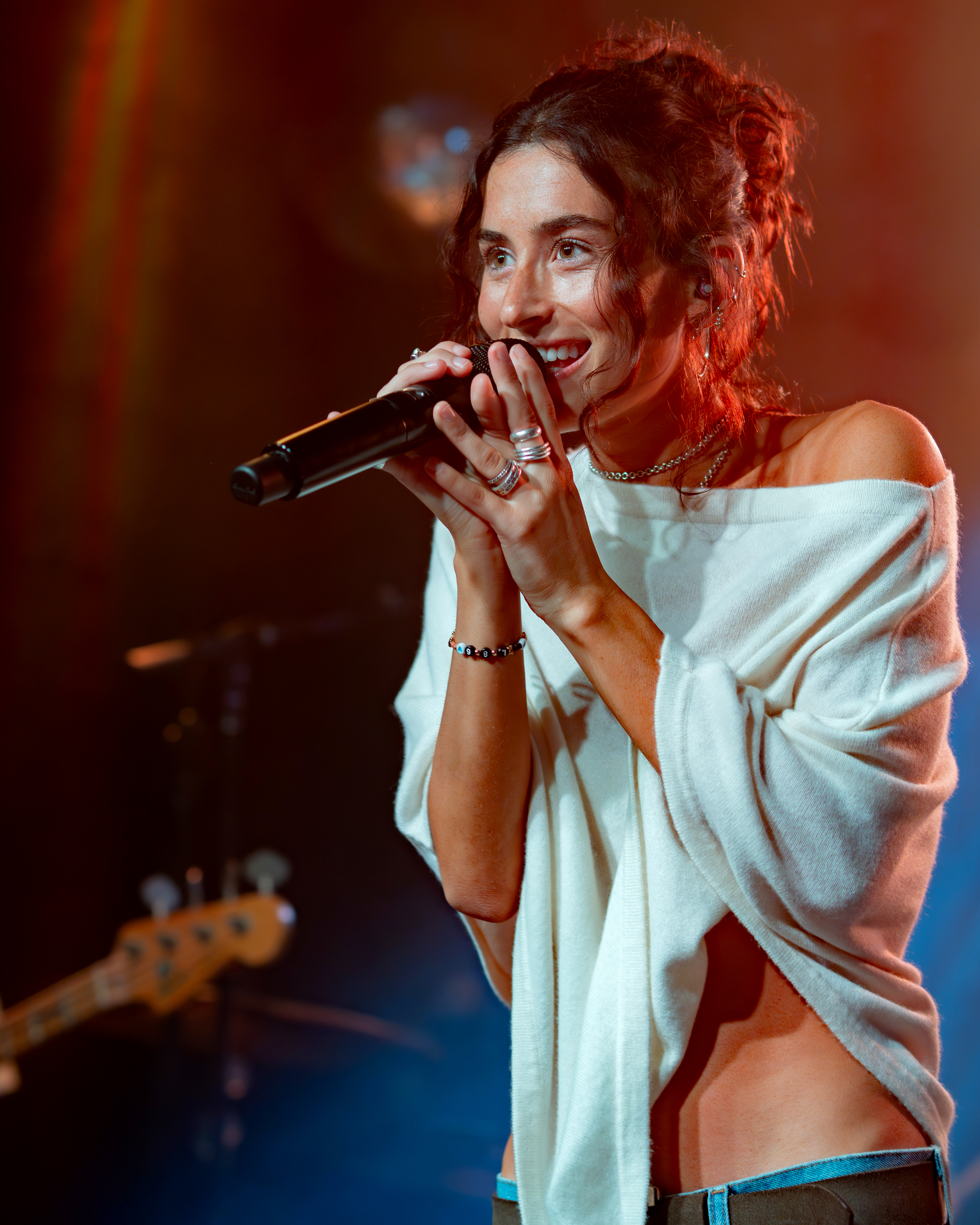
Lefty performing at Moroccan Lounge in 2026

"Boston" was released on March 27, 2026. The song became Lefty's first song to enter the Billboard Hot 100 chart, debuting at number 95 and peaking at number two. Lefty performed the song on Jimmy Kimmel Live! and made a surprise appearance with Mumford & Sons at Madison Square Garden, where they performed a duet version of the song. She also performed it at the Stagecoach Festival.

On June 10, 2026, Lefty released a live performance video of "Boston" in partnership with YouTube. The video featured Lefty performing the song with the musicians who had accompanied her during its recording. Lefty said she had written the song with friends and wanted them to be part of the video as well.

"I Know I Know" was released as the album's third single on May 1, 2026, along with a music video. This followed her January release of "Thinking 'bout You" and her March breakout single "Boston". Lefty performed her first headline concerts at the Moroccan Lounge in Los Angeles on May 13, 2026, and the Mercury Lounge in New York City on May 19.

"Something to Lose" featuring American country music singer Vincent Mason was released on May 15, 2026, in conjunction with Lefty's second EP, Is This Heaven?, and was later added to the album. Lefty co-wrote the song with Grace Enger, Jon Decious, and Luke Dick. The song features pedal steel and acoustic guitar. Lefty sings the first verse from the perspective of a woman who is reluctant to become emotionally close to her partner. Mason sings the second verse from the man's perspective, describing how their relationship changed his outlook on life. They sing the final chorus together. The lyric video was released on July 6, 2026.

=== Long Way Home Tour ===
On August 24, 2026, Lefty announced the "Long Way Home Tour" in support of the album. The North American leg will begin on January 9, 2027, at the Fillmore Detroit in Detroit, Michigan. It will finish on February 20 at the Aragon Ballroom in Chicago. Dates were announced for Toronto, Montreal, Boston, Brooklyn, Philadelphia, Washington, D.C., Atlanta, Dallas, Houston, Austin, San Francisco, Salt Lake City, Denver and Nashville. The tour comes after Lefty's headline shows and festival appearances in North America and Australia during 2026.

== Critical reception ==
Professional ratings
Review scores
Source	Rating
Country Central	6.9/10
The Guardian	2/5 stars
The Needle Drop	NOT GOOD
Paste	D−
Ratings Game Music	D
Showbiz by PS	2.8/10

Long Way Home received a generally negative response from critics and listeners. Writing for The Guardian, Laura Snapes argued that Lefty's quick rise as the daughter of the multi-billionaire Groupon co-founder Eric Lefkofsky was hard to separate from the quality of her songwriting, which Snapes found simple. She pointed out that Lefty's breakout single "Boston" was so similar to Noah Kahan's "Stick Season" that Kahan received a late writing credit and that her words did not have the same deep personal details as Kahan's or the "clever country knowledge" of another singer, Ella Langley. Snapes also said that Lefty's vocals and the way she spoke with an inauthentic Southern accent seemed fake because she grew up in California, and she compared the album's style and the usual themes of bar-and-romance to other country-pop songs coming out around the same time. Stereogum offered similar assessments, describing Lefty's vocal performance as lacking in personality and charisma and arguing the album offered little insight into her identity as an artist.

Anthony Fantano of The Needle Drop gave Long Way Home a negative review, criticizing its songwriting, production, and lack of lyrical detail. Fantano also noted that many of the songs talked much about romantic relationships and that the album seemed to have been finished in a hurry following the success of "Boston". Emma Platt of Ratings Game Music gave the album a D rating, praising its instrumentation and several of its songs while criticizing Lefty's vocals and songwriting. Platt also noted the album lacked a distinct artistic identity beyond that of a simple country singer image. She highlighted songs such as "Why Wouldn't We" and "Lean In, Kiss Me" as tracks where her personality did come through, suggesting she had the potential to make a stronger follow-up. Tim Strong of Showbiz by PS gave Long Way Home a 2.8 out of 10, criticizing the production and songwriting. Strong considered "Lean In, Kiss Me" to be the album's strongest track but felt that much of the record was repetitive and lacked originality. Strong also criticized Lefty's vocals and compared "I Know I Know" to Shaboozey's "A Bar Song (Tipsy)".

Joel Reuben Pauley of Country Central argued that the album lacked the intentionality of country songwriting. He stated that its simple production and consistent tone gave it broad crossover appeal, comparable to that of pop artists such as Olivia Rodrigo and Gracie Abrams. Pauley also noted that the album's steady tempo and recurring themes could make it feel repetitive when listened to in its entirety. Billboard similarly described Reeves's production as complementing Lefty's vocal style well, calling the result an approachable, if tonally uniform, introduction to her sound. Writing for Entertainment Focus, James Daykin described the album as a mix of country stories and pop tunes, drawing comparisons to Colbie Caillat, Jason Mraz and Taylor Swift early-era and singled out "Forever Guy" and "Feel Better" as proof the album shows depth, which Lefty has just started to reach. Daykin characterized the album overall as a "hugely likeable, often infectious introduction to an artist with plenty of room and plenty of reasons to grow".

== Commercial performance ==
Long Way Home debuted at number 10 on the Australian Albums Chart, number 9 on the New Zealand Albums Chart, number 60 on the Irish Albums Chart and number 77 on the UK Albums Chart in its first week. This marked Lefty's first appearance on the Irish and UK albums charts.

== Track listing ==
All song, writing, and production credits are according to the album's liner notes and Apple Music.

No.	Title	Writer(s)	Producer(s)	Length
1.	"Lean In, Kiss Me"	Stella Lefty; Grace Enger; Jacob Kasher Hindlin; Julia Michaels; Michael Pollack; Joe Reeves	Reeves	2:38
2.	"Whiskey"	Lefty; Enger; Hindlin; Reeves	Reeves	2:58
3.	"Thinking 'bout You"	Lefty; Enger; Sadie Jean	Enger; Hoskins; Reeves	2:20
4.	"Ain't Something I Do"	Lefty; Enger; Reeves; Jake Torrey	Reeves	2:56
5.	"Boston"	Lefty; Enger; Hindlin; Reeves; Noah Kahan (Note: Lefty and her team gave Noah Kahan a writing credit on "Boston" after fans on social media began noting that the song sounded similar to Kahan's own breakout hit, "Stick Season".)	Reeves	2:50
6.	"Missing You"	Lefty; Sarah Aarons; Reeves	Reeves	2:50
7.	"I Know I Know"	Lefty; Enger; Hindlin; Reeves	Reeves	2:39
8.	"Slow Dancin'"	Lefty; Enger	Enger; Reeves	2:04
9.	"Forever Guy"	Lefty; Joey Barrios; Enger; Hindlin; Reeves	Reeves	2:24
10.	"Something to Lose" (with Vincent Mason)	Lefty; Jon Decious; Luke Dick; Enger	Reeves^{[p]}; Brett Truitt^{[v]}	2:55
11.	"Good at Leaving"	Lefty; Hindlin; Connor McDonough; Riley McDonough; Torrey	C. McDonough; R. McDonough; Reeves^{[a]}	2:49
12.	"Summer You Were Mine"	Lefty; Enger; Mark Selby; Tia Sillers; Konrad Snyder	Reeves; Snyder^{[c]}	3:07
13.	"Feel Better"	Lefty; Grady Block; Ernest; Reeves	Reeves	2:54
14.	"Why Wouldn't We"	Lefty; Grady Block; Steph Jones; Emily Weisband	Reeves; Block^{[c]}	2:37
Total length:				38:01

=== Notes ===
- ^{^[p]} signifies a producer and vocal producer
- ^{^[c]} signifies a co-producer
- ^{^[a]} signifies an additional producer
- ^{^[v]} signifies a vocal producer

== Personnel ==
Credits are adapted from Tidal.

=== Musicians ===
- Stella Lefty – vocals
- Joe Reeves – acoustic guitar, bass (tracks 1, 2, 4, 6, 7, 9, 10, 12–14); banjo, drum programming, electric guitar (1, 2, 4, 6, 7, 9, 10, 12, 14); mandolin (1, 2, 4, 6, 7, 9, 10, 12), piano (1, 2, 4, 6, 9, 12), programming (3, 5, 7, 8), harmonica (6)
- Grace Enger – background vocals (1–5, 7, 8, 10), programming (3, 8), harmony vocals (3)
- Joe Harvey Whyte – pedal steel guitar (1, 2, 4, 5, 7, 9, 10)
- Evan Hutchings – percussion (1, 4, 7), drums (10)
- Hoskins – programming (3)
- Jake Torrey – acoustic guitar (4)
- Sarah Aarons – backing vocals (6)
- Matt Combs – fiddle (7)
- Vincent Mason – vocals (10)
- Brett Truitt – background vocals (10)
- Connor McDonough – programming (11)
- Riley McDonough – programming (11)
- Konrad Snyder – acoustic guitar (12)
- Lewis Smith – banjo (13)
- Ronan Stewart – fiddle (13)
- John David Carerra – pedal steel guitar (13)
- Grady Block – acoustic guitar, background vocals, banjo, bass, drum programming, electric guitar (14)

=== Technical ===
- Nathan Dantzler – mastering (1, 2, 4–7, 9–14)
- Dale Becker – mastering (3, 8)
- Pedro Calloni – mixing (1, 2, 4–7, 9–14)
- Eli Heisler – mixing assistance (3), mixing (8)
- Rob Kinelski – mixing (3, 8)
- Joe Reeves – engineering (5)
- Jonny Solway – engineering (13)
- Theo Lusty – engineering assistance (13)

== Charts ==
Chart performance for Long Way Home
Chart (2026)	Peak position
Australian Albums (ARIA)	10
Australian Country Albums (ARIA)	1
Belgian Albums (Ultratop Flanders)	176
Canadian Albums (Billboard)	8
Dutch Albums (Album Top 100)	76
Irish Albums (IRMA)	60
New Zealand Albums (RMNZ)	9
Norwegian Albums (IFPI Norge)	79
UK Albums (Official Charts)	77
UK Country Albums (Official Charts)	9
US Billboard 200	11
US Top Country Albums (Billboard)	4

== Certifications ==
Certifications for Long Way Home
Region	Certification	Certified units/sales
Canada (Music Canada)	Gold	40,000^{‡}
^{‡} Sales+streaming figures based on certification alone.
