= Damned If I Do =

Damned If I Do

- "Damned If I Do" (The Alan Parsons Project song)
- "Damned If I Do" (Vincent Mason song)
- "Damned If I Do", song from Emancipation (Prince album)
- "Damned If I Do", song from film A Thin Line Between Love and Hate
