= Need To =

Need To may refer to:

- "Need To" (Gavin Adcock song)
- "Need To" (Korn song)
