= Stella Lefty =

American singer-songwriter (born 2002)

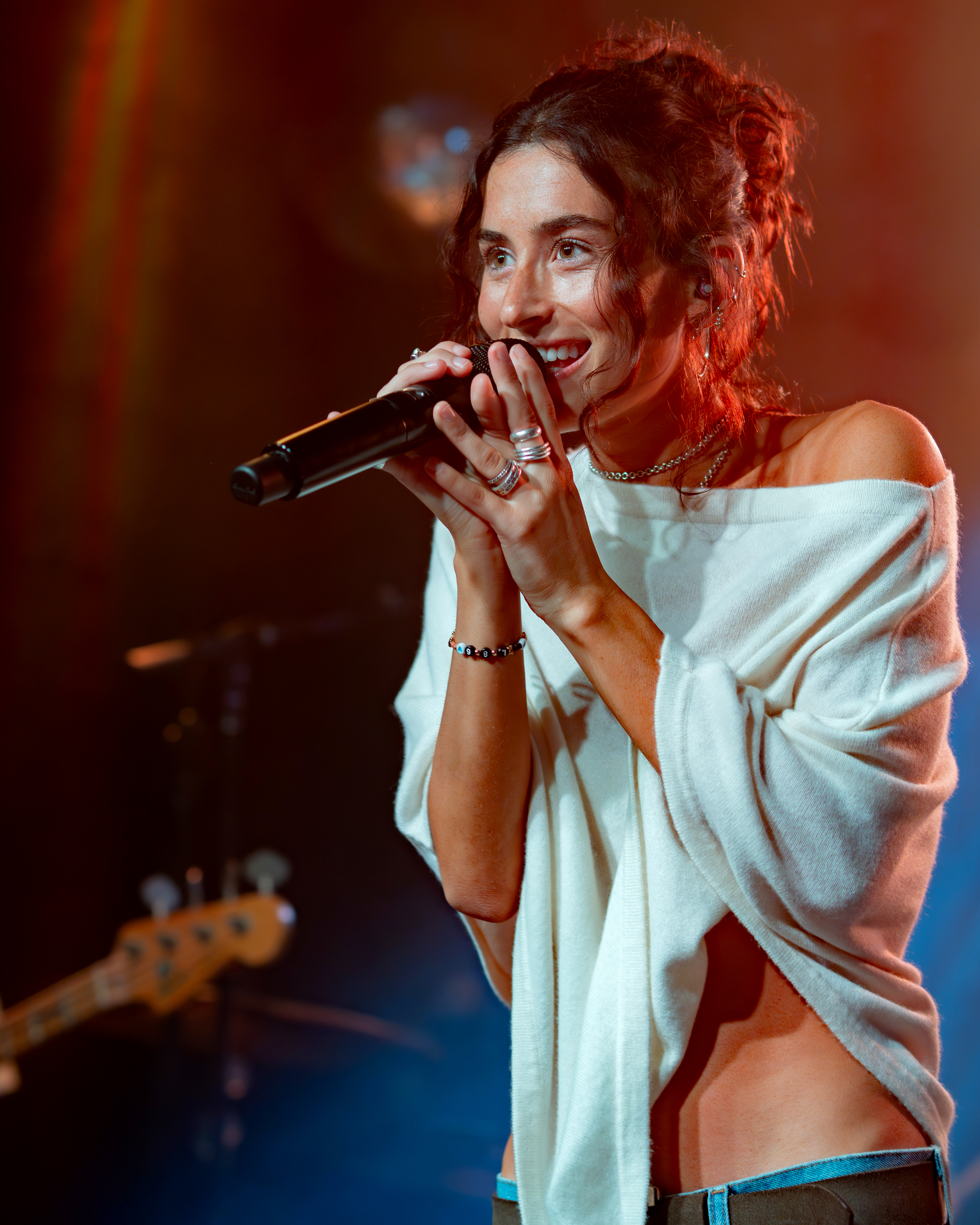
- Lefty performing live in 2026

Background information
- Born: Stella Lefkofsky; August 13, 2002 (age 24); Glencoe, Illinois, U.S.
- Origin: Los Angeles, California, U.S.
- Education: Tulane University
- Genres: Country pop; indie folk
- Occupation: Singer-songwriter
- Instruments: Vocals; piano; guitar
- Years active: 2024–present
- Label: Atlantic Outpost
- Father: Eric Lefkofsky
- Website: stella-lefty.com

Stella Lefkofsky (born August 13, 2002), better known by her stage name Stella Lefty, is an American singer-songwriter. Her 2026 country-pop single "Boston" peaked at number two on the US Billboard Hot 100.

== Early life and education ==
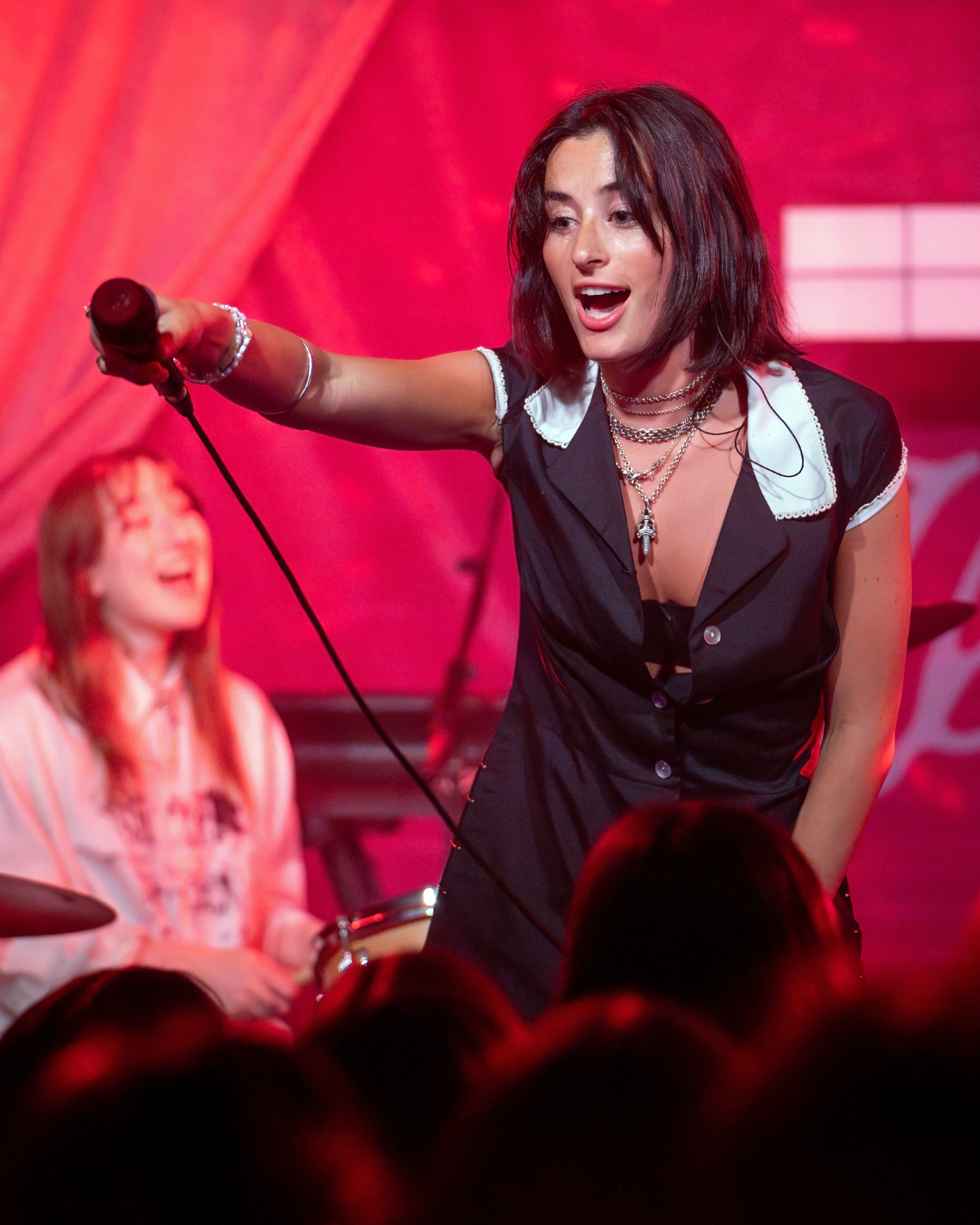
Lefty in 2025

Stella Lefkofsky was born on August 13, 2002, and was raised in Glencoe, Illinois. Her father is billionaire businessman Eric Lefkofsky, a co-founder of Groupon and Mediaocean and the founder and CEO of Tempus AI.

Lefty started writing songs and taking guitar lessons as a child but initially did not perform publicly because of her stage fright. She grew up listening mostly to country and pop musicians, including Taylor Swift, Miley Cyrus, Tim McGraw, and Brad Paisley. After graduating from New Trier High School, she attended Tulane University in 2020 to study public health, with "no plan of doing anything in music". Lefty graduated from Tulane University in 2024. She is a sister of Pi Beta Phi. While studying abroad in Amsterdam, she began sharing her earliest song compositions on TikTok.

== Career ==
In 2022, Lefty began posting videos of her singing song covers and original songs to her TikTok account. In 2024, she released her debut single "Kiss Me", which gained popularity on TikTok. Record producer J Kash soon messaged her online and the two began collaborating after she moved to Los Angeles. She released her debut extended play (EP) Tragic, Really, in 2025. In January 2026, she released the single "Thinkin' Bout You", which she wrote in collaboration with friends Grace Enger and Sadie Jean. Her song "The Kill" was released in February of that year as part of the soundtrack for the film Scream 7. Shortly thereafter, she signed with Atlantic Records' country music imprint, Atlantic Outpost.

In 2026 her country pop single "Boston" debuted on the Billboard Hot 100 chart at number 95 in April and climbed to the top-20 a month later. In May 2026, she released her second EP, Is This Heaven?, which featured the previously-released songs "Boston", "Thinking 'Bout You", and "I Know I Know" and a collaboration with Vincent Mason, "Something to Lose". Is This Heaven? debuted at number 38 on the Billboard 200 chart and at number nine on the Top Country Albums chart with 20,000 units sold.

In March 2026, it was announced that Lefty would perform as an opening act for Tucker Wetmore's Brunette World Tour. Lefty quietly dropped out of those dates without explanation before posting an apology to her Instagram stories for having not announced her departure from the tour earlier.

Lefty was nominated for Best New Artist and Best Country (for "Boston") at the 2026 MTV Video Music Awards. Her debut studio album Long Way Home was released on August 21, 2026. For The Guardian, Laura Snapes gave the album two out of five stars, calling Lefty's songwriting on it "stunningly unremarkable" and the album overall "indistinct and trope-ridden", while Abby Jones of Paste gave it a "D-" rating for its "tragically nearsighted" perspective, "painfully unimaginative" formula, and "unremarkable instrumentals". Lefty announced her Long Way Home Tour, set to begin in January 2027.

Lefty performed at the Grand Ole Opry for the first time in September 2026. The same month, it was reported that she had parted with Disruptor Management, which she had been in partnership with "since the beginning of her career."

On October 23, 2026, Lefty and Bailey Zimmerman released a song together entitled "My Kinda Love" for the soundtrack of the third season of Nobody Wants This.

On November 5, 2026, Jordan North, Chris Stark and Siân Welby announced on Capital Breakfast that Lefty would perform at Capital’s Jingle Bell Ball at The O2 in London on December 6 alongside John Legend, Freya Skye, Clean Bandit, Tom Grennan, Jamie Miller, D.O.D, Leona Lewis, Rudimental and Jason Derulo.

== Musical style ==
Lefty's music has been described as country, with her describing the genre as "what I love with my fucking heart and soul" while expressing ambivalence toward performing it despite not being from the South. She has described her voice as raspy. For The New Yorker, Brady Brickner-Wood described Lefty's singing voice as an affected "raspy Southern twang" and her songs as "projecting the uncomplicated joy of a wide-eyed college graduate who goes to the bar on the weekends and falls in love at first sight".

== Personal life ==
As of July 2026, Lefty is in a relationship with fellow singer-songwriter Vincent Mason.

== Public image ==
Upon her rise to fame in mid-2026, Lefty was widely criticized online as both a "nepo baby" and an "industry plant" due to her father's billionaire status, with many claiming that the opportunities she had been given were solely a result of her family's wealth and that the success of her song "Boston" had been manufactured. Adam Alpert, Lefty's manager and the founder of Disruptor Records, stated in response to the criticisms that "industry plants don't exist" and that those who were deemed as such had just made "great songs that people like".

=== Interpolations and plagiarism accusations ===
Social media users and critics have denounced Lefty for releasing songs that sound similar to the work of other artists without providing proper credit, coining the name "Stella Thefty" in response to the appropriation.

Lefty was accused online of plagiarizing the melody and structure of Noah Kahan's 2022 song "Stick Season" to make "Boston", with Miranda Wollen of Paste deriding the latter as a "poor imitation" of the former and dubbing Lefty a "Noah Kahan copycat". Kahan received a writing credit on the song after members of his team reached out to her to note the similarities between the two songs, though she stated that she "wasn't thinking about Noah Kahan" while writing it, which critics and social media users expressed disbelief at and contrasted with her numerous covers of "Stick Season" on TikTok.

Lefty's song "Summer You Were Mine", also from Long Way Home, interpolates the Chicks' song "There's Your Trouble", which briefly received backlash when its writers, Tia Sillers and Mark Selby, were uncredited on streaming platforms. Atlantic attributed the omission to a technical error and confirmed that permission had been received to interpolate the song prior to its release. The album's closing song "Why Wouldn't We" was described online as copying the melody and call-and-response lyrics from Blake Shelton's 2017 song "I'll Name the Dogs". She faced further accusations that the chorus of her song "Misery", from Tragic, Really, was musically similar to the chorus of "A Million Dreams" from the 2017 musical film The Greatest Showman and that the verses of her standalone single "Seven Eleven" used nearly the same melody as Wheatus's "Teenage Dirtbag" (which she had also previously covered). Abby Jones, writing for Paste, found resemblances between Lefty's song "Good at Leaving", from Long Way Home, and the Justin Bieber song "Ghost". As of September 2026, none of Lefty's aforementioned work credits songwriters outside of her writing team.

== Discography ==
=== Albums ===
List of studio albums, with selected details
Title	Details	Peak chart positions							Certifications
Title	Details	US	US Country	AUS	CAN	IRE	NZ	UK	Certifications
Long Way Home	Released: August 21, 2026; Label: Atlantic Outpost; Formats: Digital download, streaming	11	4	10	8	60	9	77	MC: Gold

=== Extended plays ===
List of extended plays, with selected details and chart positions
Title	EP details	Peak chart positions				
Title	EP details	US	US Country	AUS	CAN	NZ
Tragic, Really	Released: July 15, 2025; Label: Independent; Formats: Digital download, streaming	—	—	—	—	—
Is This Heaven?	Released: May 15, 2026; Label: Atlantic Outpost; Formats: Digital download, streaming	24	6	21	16	27
"—" denotes a recording that did not chart or was not released in that territory.

=== Singles ===
List of singles as a lead artist, with selected chart positions and certifications, showing year released and album name
Title	Year	Peak chart positions										Certifications	Album
Title	Year	US	US Country	US Country Airplay	AUS	CAN	CAN Country	IRE	NZ	UK	WW	Certifications	Album
"Kiss Me"	2024	—	—	—	—	—	—	—	—	—	—		Non-album single
"Cynic"	2025	—	—	—	—	—	—	—	—	—	—		Tragic, Really
"See Through"	2025	—	—	—	—	—	—	—	—	—	—		Tragic, Really
"Decay"	2025	—	—	—	—	—	—	—	—	—	—		Tragic, Really
"Grace"	2025	—	—	—	—	—	—	—	—	—	—		Tragic, Really
"Seven Eleven"	2025	—	—	—	—	—	—	—	—	—	—		Non-album singles
"Could've Been Me"	2025	—	—	—	—	—	—	—	—	—	—		Non-album singles
"Thinking 'bout You"	2026	—	50	—	—	—	—	—	—	—	—	MC: Gold	Is This Heaven?
"Slow Dancin'"	2026	—	—	—	—	—	—	—	—	—	—		Is This Heaven?
"The Kill"	2026	—	—	—	—	—	—	—	—	—	—		Scream 7
"Boston"	2026	2	2	1	4	2	1	8	5	3	10	RIAA: Platinum; ARIA: Platinum; BPI: Gold; MC: 3× Platinum; RMNZ: Platinum	Is This Heaven?
"I Know I Know"	2026	— (Note: "I Know I Know" did not enter the Billboard Hot 100, but peaked at number 8 on the Bubbling Under Hot 100.)	34	—	—	53	—	—	—	87	—	MC: Gold	Is This Heaven?
"Something to Lose" (featuring Vincent Mason)	2026	40	15	21	—	60	49	—	—	—	—	MC: Gold	Is This Heaven?
"Lean In, Kiss Me"	2026	— (Note: "Lean In, Kiss Me" did not enter the Billboard Hot 100, but peaked at number 14 on the Bubbling Under Hot 100.)	43	—	—	—	—	—	— (Note: "Lean In, Kiss Me" did not enter the NZ Top 40 Singles Chart, but peaked at number 7 on the NZ Hot Singles Chart.)	—	—		Long Way Home
"—" denotes a recording that did not chart or was not released in that territory.

=== Other charted songs ===
List of other charted songs, with selected chart positions, showing year released and album name
Title	Year	Peak chart positions				Album
Title	Year	US Bub.	US Country	CAN	NZ Hot	Album
"Good at Leaving"	2026	—	—	—	16	Is This Heaven?
"Summer You Were Mine"	2026	21	48	—	14	Long Way Home
"My Kinda Love" (with Bailey Zimmerman)	2026	—	—	98	28	Nobody Wants This: Season 3

== Awards and nominations ==
Year	Award	Category	Recipient(s) and nominee(s)	Result	Ref.
2026	MTV Video Music Awards	Best Country	"Boston"	Nominated	
2026	MTV Video Music Awards	Best New Artist	Herself	Nominated	

== Tours ==
=== Headlining ===
- Our First Shows Together (2026)
- Stella Lefty Live (2026)
- Long Way Home Tour (2027)

=== Supporting act ===
- For Your Validation Tour (2025) (Alessi Rose)
- Worldwide Hysteria Tour (2025) (Jessie Murph)
- Fragile Egos Tour (2026) (Cameron Whitcomb)
- My Mess, My Heart, My Life Tour (2026) (Myles Smith)
- The Brunette World Tour (2026) (Tucker Wetmore)
