= Hell Is a Dance Floor =

2024 song by Vincent Mason

Promotional single by Vincent Mason

from the album There I Go
- Released: February 22, 2024
- Genre: Country
- Length: 3:30
- Label: Interscope; MCA Nashville; Music Soup
- Songwriters: Vincent Mason; Jake Greene; Chase McDaniel; Lauren Hungate
- Producer: Brett Truitt

Music video
- "Hell Is a Dance Floor" on YouTube

"Hell Is a Dance Floor" is a song by American country music singer Vincent Mason, released on February 22, 2024, as the first promotional single from his debut studio album, There I Go (2025). It became his breakout hit after going viral on the video-sharing app TikTok. The song was written by Mason himself and Chase McDaniel and produced by Brett Truitt.

== Composition ==
The song contains acoustic guitar strums, steel guitar and hollow kick drums. It finds Vincent Mason dwelling on his heartbreak following a breakup, depicting himself as being lost in thought and drinking alcohol to cope with his sorrow. He particularly describes the pain of watching his ex-girlfriend dancing with her new partner, noting that he believed he had recovered from his heartache, only for it to be reignited and worsened upon seeing her in a new relationship.

== Live performances ==
Vincent Mason performed the song at The Kelly Clarkson Show on October 22, 2025.

== Charts ==
Chart performance for "Hell Is a Dance Floor"
Chart (2026)	Peak position
US Hot Country Songs (Billboard)	49

== Certifications ==
Region	Certification	Certified units/sales
United States (RIAA)	Gold	500,000^{‡}
^{‡} Sales+streaming figures based on certification alone.
