= Wish You Well (Vincent Mason song) =

Single by Vincent Mason

from the album There I Go
- Released: February 24, 2025
- Studio: Back Stage (Nashville); Blackbird (Berry Hill)
- Genre: Country
- Length: 2:37
- Label: Interscope; MCA Nashville; Music Soup
- Songwriters: Jessie Jo Dillon; Chris LaCorte; Blake Pendergrass; Geoff Warburton
- Producer: Chris LaCorte

Vincent Mason singles chronology
"Wish You Well" (2025)	"Something to Lose" (2026)

Audio video
- "Wish You Well" on YouTube

"Wish You Well" is a song by American country music singer Vincent Mason. It was released on February 24, 2025, as Mason's debut single and the lead single from his debut studio album, There I Go. The song was co-written by Jessie Jo Dillon, Chris LaCorte, who also produced the song, Blake Pendergrass, and Geoff Warburton.

== Credits and personnel ==
- Vincent Mason – vocals
- Chris LaCorte – producer, recording, electric guitar, acoustic guitar, synthesizer, percussion, bass
- Justin Schipper – additional engineer, steel guitar, dobro
- Aaron Sterling – additional engineer, drums, percussion
- Josh Reedy – background vocals
- Geoff Warburton – acoustic guitar
- Andrew Mendelson – mastering
- Dave Clauss – mixing
- Nick Zinnanti – editing

== Charts ==
Chart performance for "Wish You Well"
Chart (2025–2026)	Peak position
Canada Country (Billboard)	28
US Country Airplay (Billboard)	16
US Hot Country Songs (Billboard)	41
