= Damned If I Do (Vincent Mason song) =

2026 single by Vincent Mason

Single by Vincent Mason

from the album There I Go
- Released: July 18, 2025
- Genre: Country
- Length: 3:37 (album version); 3:16 (radio edit)
- Label: Interscope; MCA Nashville; Music Soup
- Songwriters: Vincent Mason; Jacob Hackworth; Lauren Hungate
- Producers: Mason; Jake Gear; Brett Truitt

Vincent Mason singles chronology
"Wish You Well" (2025)	"Damned If I Do" (2025)	"Something to Lose" (2026)

Music video
- "Damned If I Do" on YouTube

"Damned If I Do" is a song by American country music singer Vincent Mason, It was released on July 18, 2025 as the second single from his debut studio album, There I Go (2025). He wrote the song with Jacob Hackworth and Lauren Hungate and produced it with Jake Gear and Brett Truitt.

== Background ==
According to Vincent Mason, when he composed the song he "wanted something different musically that I could look forward to playing every night". He also said of the song:

It felt like a rock song from the beginning, and I felt like that was great for where I was at. People have started calling me 'the Heartbreak Kid,' and I love those kind of sad songs. This one's less wide-eyed and heartbroken and surprised and sad. It's more pissed off and frustrated. You've seen it go wrong a few times. It's the natural process of getting your heart broken a lot. You eventually stop being sad. I think people need to know that I can get pissed off. And for me, that grittier sound up against my vocals, which are pretty soft, it fits.

== Composition ==
The song features an electric guitar throughout, with a prolonged instrumental intro. Lyrically, Vincent Mason revolves around his lingering heartbreak from a past love affair and struggle to move on. In the first verse, he expresses he has no motivation to go outside despite the pleasant weather and is always reminded of her. In the chorus, he metaphorically emphasizes his intense emotional pain and acknowledges that he will remain heartbroken, whether he chooses to let her go or not. As he tries to adjust to being single, Mason then considers the type of woman he will meet in a future relationship.

== Critical reception ==
Noah Wade of Euphoria Magazine praised the song for its "heartbreakingly bitter hook that manages to sneak up on the listener as toe-tappingly singable despite its subject matter." He added, "Whether the listener has lived to tell the tale of their own, 'I wish to move on, but how?' story, or perhaps they're in the middle of one at this very moment, it is a song that is irrefutably human: 'I'm damned if I do, I'm damned if I don't.' Mason's vocals, distinctly in peak form in the midst of a heightened working year, are one of a number of highlights, as his conversational tone throughout the chorus disguises the otherwise tricky melodic patterns consistently keeping him at an impasse of upper baritone chest voice."

== Charts ==
Chart performance for "Damned If I Do"
Chart (2025–2026)	Peak position
US Billboard Hot 100	77
US Country Airplay (Billboard)	43
US Hot Country Songs (Billboard)	21

== Certifications ==
Region	Certification	Certified units/sales
United States (RIAA)	Platinum	1,000,000^{‡}
^{‡} Sales+streaming figures based on certification alone.
