= Last One to Know =

2025 song by Gavin Adcock

Promotional single by Gavin Adcock

from the album Own Worst Enemy
- Released: June 27, 2025
- Studio: Full Moon Studio (Watkinsville, Georgia)
- Genre: Country
- Length: 2:57
- Label: Thrivin' Here; Warner Nashville
- Songwriters: Gavin Adcock; Erik Dylan; Luke Laird; Jack Rauton
- Producer: Jay Rodgers

Music video
- "Last One to Know" on YouTube

"Last One to Know" is a song by American country music singer Gavin Adcock, released on June 27, 2025 as the sixth promotional single from his third studio album, Own Worst Enemy (2025). It was written by Adcock himself, Erik Dylan, Luke Laird and Jack Rauton and produced by Jay Rodgers.

== Background ==
The song partly based on Adcock's personal experiences. In an interview with Billboard, he said:

I've definitely woke up in some random spots a time or two, but I was just lucky to be alive. Those nights are really eye-opening. You have a lot of anxiety the next day, and you’re just real blessed that you just made it home and you just pace yourself next time.

== Composition and lyrics ==
"Last One to Know" is a country song with steel guitar. In the lyrics, Gavin Adcock wakes up in the morning and is haunted by the events of last night, singing "My buddy called and said, 'I lost a couple screws' / Been tryna tighten them up, but they keep coming loose / Yeah, it's a wonder that I didn't see the light / For a lawman didn't tackle me, or read me my rights". He remembers certain details of the chaotic night ("Wild-ass women, hard-ass living") and is unsure about what exactly had happened, but surmises that he and his friends were up to no good. The second verse finds him describing how the night had started, with him trying to reacquaint with a woman, only to be rejected and become drunk on whiskey.

== Critical reception ==
Alli Patton of Holler wrote "'Last One To Know' comes together as one cool country groove. Steadily paced and slinkily arranged, the song, with its sashaying beat and distant steel, has a distinct swagger, something the artist has deftly mastered. From beginning to end, the tune is led by an all-around enticing air as Adcock croons of wild nights and fast times too good to remember."

== Charts ==
=== Weekly charts ===
Weekly chart performance for "Last One to Know"
Chart (2025–2026)	Peak position
Canada (Canadian Hot 100)	44
US Billboard Hot 100	45
US Hot Country Songs (Billboard)	14

=== Year-end charts ===
Year-end chart performance for "Last One to Know"
Chart (2025)	Position
US Hot Country Songs (Billboard)	93
