= Actin' Up Again =

Studio album by Gavin Adcock
- Released: August 2, 2024
- Genre: Country
- Length: 55:07
- Label: Thrivin' Here; Warner Nashville
- Producer: Jay Rodgers

Gavin Adcock chronology
Bonfire Blackout (2023)	Actin' Up Again (2024)	Own Worst Enemy (2025)

Actin' Up Again is the second studio album by American country music artist Gavin Adcock. The album was released on August 2, 2024, via Thrivin' Here and Warner Nashville and produced by Jay Rodgers.

The album marks Adcock's major record-label debut.

== Background ==
Adcock announced Actin' Up Again during CMA Fest week in June 2024, revealing the promotional single "Sweetheart" would be released on June 7.

Adcock wrote or co-wrote every track on the record.

== Critical reception ==
Professional ratings
Review scores
Source	Rating
AllMusic	3/5 stars
Entertainment Focus	3.5/5 stars

AllMusic described the album as "party-starting, beer-drinking anthems and hangdog breakup ballads" that strike "the sweet spot between Southern rock and bro-country with amiable precision. Laura Cooney of Entertainment Focus praised Adcock's gravelly drawl, varied influences, and standout tracks like "Back to This Bar," "Four Leaf Clover," and "Wake Up With You," but noted that the record felt "too heavily weighted towards the back end" and could benefit from trimming.

== Commercial performance ==
Ahead of the album's release, "A Cigarette" surpassed 70 million US on-demand streams and 500,000 unit equivalents. Other singles, including "Four Leaf Clover" and "Sober", became streaming successes.

== Track listing ==
All tracks written or co-written by Adcock with additional co-writers listed.

No.	Title	Writer(s)	Length
1.	"Actin' Up Again"		3:13
2.	"Back to This Bar"	Jack Rauton	3:46
3.	"Sweetheart"	Rauton	3:18
4.	"Wake Up With You"	Rhett Akins; Michael Carter; Ben Hayslip; Lindsay Rimes	3:03
5.	"Sober"	Rauton	3:13
6.	"Four Leaf Clover"		3:11
7.	"Want Me to Be"		2:49
8.	"Don't Like Leavin' You"	Spencer Bargfrede	3:49
9.	"A Cigarette"		2:59
10.	"As He Could Be"		4:40
11.	"All I Need"	Bargfrede	3:28
12.	"The Battle"		4:49
13.	"Past Actions"	Rauton	3:24
14.	"Run Your Mouth"	Rauton	2:40
15.	"Demons of Today"		3:42
16.	"Hours and Hours"	Jay Rodgers	2:56
Total length:			55:07

== Personnel ==
- Gavin Adcock – vocals, acoustic guitar (6, 8, 10, 14, 15)
- Bennett Boswell – acoustic guitar (tracks 1, 8, 9, 15)
- Brian Dennard – drums (tracks 1–4, 7, 11, 13–15)
- Brody Frasier – electric guitar (tracks 1, 2, 4, 6, 8, 11–15), guitar (3), acoustic guitar, banjo (15)
- Michael Westbrook – electric guitar (tracks 1, 2, 4, 8, 11, 12, 14, 15), steel guitar (3), acoustic guitar (4, 11)
- Scott Nicholson – organ (track 1), acoustic guitar (7), piano (10)
- Jack Rauton – acoustic guitar (tracks 2–4, 13)
- Andrew Hanmer – drums (tracks 6, 12)
- John Neff – steel guitar (tracks 9, 10)
- Spencer Bargfrede – acoustic guitar (tracks 10, 11)
- Jay Rodgers – producer, mixing, engineer (all tracks), bass (tracks 1–4, 6, 7, 10–16), electric guitar (1, 16), guitar (3), acoustic guitar, drums, keyboard (16)
- Joel Hatstat – mastering (all tracks)

== Charts ==
Weekly chart performance for Actin' Up Again
Chart (2024)	Peak position
US Billboard 200	82
US Top Country Albums (Billboard)	19
