= Own Worst Enemy =

Studio album by Gavin Adcock
- Released: August 15, 2025
- Studios: Full Moon Studio (Watkinsville, Georgia)
- Genre: Country
- Length: 75:26
- Labels: Thrivin' Here; Warner Nashville
- Producers: Will Bundy; Brent Cobb; Jay Rodgers; Oran Thornton

Gavin Adcock chronology
Actin' Up Again (2024)	Own Worst Enemy (2025)	The Day I Hang It Up (2026)

Singles from Own Worst Enemy
- 1. "Never Call Again" Released: June 16, 2025

Own Worst Enemy is the third studio album by American country music artist Gavin Adcock. The album was released on August 15, 2025, via Thrivin' Here and Warner Nashville and co-produced by Will Bundy, Brent Cobb, Jay Rodgers, who produced Adcock's previous album, and Oran Thornton.

The album serves as the follow-up to Adcock's 2024 major-label debut Actin' Up Again, which became the largest major-label debut from a solo male artist that year and helped propel Adcock past one billion global streams.

== Background ==
Adcock's previous albums Bonfire Blackout and Actin' Up Again established him as a rising name in country rock. In 2025, while on his Need to Tour, Adcock announced Own Worst Enemy on social media.

Prior to the album's release, numerous promotional singles, including "Morning Bail", "On One", and "Last One to Know", were released. Adcock's announcement coincided with several controversies, including a widely publicized arrest for reckless driving and an ongoing debate sparked by his criticism of Beyoncé's Cowboy Carter.

"Outside Dog" was featured on the Madden NFL 26 soundtrack.

== Critical reception ==
Professional ratings
Review scores
Source	Rating
AllMusic	3/5 stars
Country Central	6.9/10
Entertainment Focus	4/5 stars
Holler	6.75/10 (Note: Collective rating of 6.75/10. Individual ratings were 6/10 by Alli Patton, 8/10 by Georgette Brooks, 6.5/10 by Soda Canter and Daisy Innes.)

Own Worst Enemy received mixed to moderately positive reviews from critics. James Daykin of Entertainment Focus gave the album four out of five stars, praising its blend of gritty confessionals and raucous rockers, and noting that Adcock's refusal to "sanitize the rough edges" resulted in a compelling, if lengthy, listening experience. Mary Claire Crabtree of Whiskey Riff highlighted "Light a Fire" as a standout track for its emotional arc and dynamic arrangements, calling it "the perfect mid-week pick-me-up." Alli Patton of Holler expressed reservations about the album's 24-track length, questioning whether the sheer volume of material diluted its impact despite admiring Adcock's consistent delivery of "hit-the-bottle kind of heartaches."

Adam Delahoussaye of Country Central praised the album's moments of vulnerability and pacing, noting that its blend of chaos and reflection "is a more self-aware way to pace the journey than most of his haters would give him credit for." He highlighted "Graveyard" and "Need To" as strong examples of Adcock pushing his artistry beyond surface-level rowdiness. He also criticized Adcock's vocal inconsistency and the album's excessive length, arguing that some tracks felt like filler.

The Holler staff gave the record a composite score of 6.75/10, with reviews ranging from six to eight out of ten. Alli Patton described the project as "excessive, inflated, dry", though she praised "Never Call Again" for its strong hook. Georgette Brookes was more favorable, calling it "surprising, gritty, palatable" and singling out "Loose Strings" and "Tall Tales" as highlights. Soda Canter and Caitlin Hall both criticized tracks like "Sick and Tired" and "Morning Bail" for leaning on clichés, but agreed that songs such as "Sunset" and "Light a Fire" showed Adcock's strengths.

== Track listing ==
All tracks produced by Jay Rodgers with co-production from Brent Cobb and Oran Thornton on "Loose Strings" and from Will Bundy on "Almost Gone" and "Unlucky Strikes".

No.	Title	Writer(s)	Length
1.	"Morning Bail"	Gavin Adcock; Jack Rauton; Colton Venner	2:55
2.	"Outside Dog"	Matt Dragstrem; Chase McGill; Josh Thompson	2:56
3.	"Light a Fire"	Adcock; Brad Clawson; Rauton	3:11
4.	"Hard Headed Heart"	Tucker Beathard; Jacob Hackworth; Josh Miller	3:27
5.	"Never Call Again"	Adcock; Rauton; Joybeth Taylor; Venner	2:56
6.	"Graveyard"	Adcock; Mitchell Ferguson; Rauton	3:23
7.	"Need To"	Casey Beathard; T. Beathard; Austin Goodloe; Taylor	3:11
8.	"Last One to Know"	Adcock; Erik Dylan; Luke Laird; Rauton	2:57
9.	"On One"	Adcock; Rhett Akins; Dan Isbell	2:45
10.	"Sick and Tired"	Adcock; Jay Rodgers	3:08
11.	"Own Worst Enemy"	Adcock	2:56
12.	"Sunset"	Adcock; Akins; Ben Hayslip; Rauton	2:54
13.	"Next to Nothin"	Adcock; Rauton	3:57
14.	"Ain't Workin Anymore"	Adcock; Jesse Frasure; Rauton	2:48
15.	"Black Sheep"	Adcock; Dylan; Rauton	2:34
16.	"Turn Down the Lights"	Adcock; Rauton	3:27
17.	"If I Can't Have You"	Adcock; Akins; Jim Beavers	2:54
18.	"Loose Strings"	Brent Cobb; Dylan; Phillip White	2:46
19.	"Almost Gone" (featuring Vincent Mason)	Adcock; Jack Hummel; Vincent Mason; Chase McDaniel; Rauton	3:22
20.	"Unlucky Strikes"	Adcock; Will Bundy; Dylan; Rauton	3:14
21.	"Losing Hope"	Adcock; T. Beathard	2:58
22.	"Regret"	Adcock; Rauton	4:28
23.	"Runner"	Adcock; Dan Pellarin; Rauton	3:20
24.	"Tall Tales"	Adcock; Liam Rian	2:59
Total length:			75:26

== Personnel ==
- Gavin Adcock – vocals (all tracks), acoustic guitar (11, 21, 22)
- Vincent Mason – vocals (track 19)
- Colton Venner – acoustic guitar (track 1)
- Dan Rubin – drums (tracks 1, 3, 6, 13, 15, 16, 23), percussion (10)
- Brody Frasier – electric guitar (tracks 1–3, 5, 6, 9–17, 21–24), acoustic guitar (2, 6), baritone guitar (8)
- Michael Westbrook – steel guitar (tracks 1, 2), electric guitar (2, 3, 5, 6, 8–17, 21–24), acoustic guitar (3, 5, 9, 12, 14–17, 24), lap steel guitar (14)
- Evan Hutchings – drums (tracks 2, 7–9, 11, 12, 14, 17, 19–21), percussion (2, 9, 19, 20)
- Tucker Beathard – acoustic guitar (track 4)
- Miles McPherson – drums, percussion (track 5)
- Dave Cohen – Hammond organ (tracks 5, 19, 20), Wurlitzer electronic piano (5), piano (20)
- Austin Goodloe – guitar (track 7)
- Luke Laird – acoustic guitar, bass, electric guitar (track 8)
- Riley Bria – electric guitar (track 9)
- Brian Dennard – drums (tracks 10, 22, 24)
- Jenee Fleenor – fiddle (track 12)
- Jack Rauton – acoustic guitar (tracks 13, 23)
- Trey Keller – background vocals (track 19)
- John Neff – electric guitar (track 19)
- Justin Schipper – pedal steel guitar (tracks 19, 20)
- Fisch – harmonica (track 24)
- Jay Rodgers – producer, mixing (all tracks), electric guitar (1, 10, 16), bass (2, 3, 5–7, 9–17, 19–24), background vocals (2, 3, 5, 9, 10, 12), acoustic guitar (10)
- Brent Cobb – producer, acoustic guitar (track 18)
- Oran Thornton – producer, drums, electric guitar (track 18)
- Will Bundy – producer, acoustic guitar, electric guitar (tracks 19, 20), background vocals, dobro (20)
- Joel Hastat – mastering (all tracks)

== Charts ==
=== Weekly charts ===
Weekly chart performance for Own Worst Enemy
Chart (2025)	Peak position
Australian Country Albums (ARIA)	26
Canadian Albums (Billboard)	53
US Billboard 200	14
US Top Country Albums (Billboard)	4

=== Year-end charts ===
Year-end chart performance for Own Worst Enemy
Chart (2025)	Position
US Top Country Albums (Billboard)	62
