= There I Go (album) =

Studio album by Vincent Mason
- Released: November 7, 2025
- Studios: Back Stage (Nashville); Blackbird (Berry Hill)
- Genre: Country
- Length: 44:36
- Labels: Interscope; MCA Nashville; Music Soup
- Producers: Jake Gear; Chris LaCorte; Vincent Mason; Brett Truitt

Vincent Mason chronology
Can't Just Be Me (2024)	There I Go (2025)

Singles from There I Go
- 1. "Wish You Well" Released: February 24, 2025; 2. "Damned If I Do" Released: July 13, 2026

There I Go is the debut studio album by American country music artist Vincent Mason. It was released on November 7, 2025, via Interscope, MCA Nashville, and Music Soup. Two singles were released: "Wish You Well" and "Damned If I Do". Five promotional singles, including RIAA-Gold-certified "Hell Is a Dance Floor", were released.

== Background ==
Mason announced the album on September 16, 2025, alongside the release of "Days Are Numbered". The album was co-produced by Mason, mainly with Jake Gear, but Chris LaCorte and Brett Truitt also produced select tracks. Mason also co-wrote 13 of the album's 14 tracks.

In support of the album, Mason joined Jordan Davis and Morgan Wallen on their respective tours.

== Critical reception ==
Professional ratings
Review scores
Source	Rating
Country Central	7.8/10
Entertainment Focus	4/5 stars

There I Go received generally positive reviews, with praise for his sound and criticism towards weak lyrics and a "stagnant delivery." In a review by Entertainment Focus, Mason's storytelling was compared to artists like Tom Petty, Bruce Springsteen, and John Mellencamp, describing Mason as an "old soul in a young man's frame".

== Track listing ==
There I Go track listing
No.	Title	Writer(s)	Length
1.	"There I Go"	Jack Hummel; Vincent Mason	4:31
2.	"Little Miss"	Ryan Beaver; Jared Keim; Mason; Chase McDaniel	2:38
3.	"Sink or Swim"	Devin Dawson; Hummel; Mason; McDaniel	2:47
4.	"Damned If I Do"	Jacob Hackworth; Lauren Hungate; Mason	3:37
5.	"Old Flame"	Hillary Lindsey; Mason; McDaniel	3:26
6.	"She Loves Leaving"	Chris LaCorte; Mason; Geoff Warburton	3:00
7.	"Anything Took Everything"	Erik Dylan; Mason; Jack Rauton	3:32
8.	"Sit with It"	Jaxson Free; Mason; McDaniel; Randy Montana	3:21
9.	"Painkiller"	Jessie Jo Dillon; Luke Laird; Mason; McDaniel	4:02
10.	"American Spirit"	Zach Abend; Andy Albert; Abram Dean; Mason	2:55
11.	"Hell Is a Dance Floor"	Mason; McDaniel	3:31
12.	"Wish You Well"	Dillon; LaCorte; Blake Pendergrass; Warburton	2:37
13.	"Days Are Numbered"	Dillon; Mason; McDaniel; Warburton	3:46
14.	"Good Run (Worktape)"	Mason	0:53
Total length:			44:36
