= Never Call Again =

Single by Gavin Adcock

from the album Own Worst Enemy
- Released: June 16, 2025 (Note: "Never Call Again" was initially released as a promotional single on March 21, 2025. It was released as an official single on June 16, 2025.)
- Studio: Full Moon Studio (Watkinsville, Georgia)
- Genre: Country
- Length: 2:55
- Label: Warner Nashville
- Songwriters: Gavin Adcock; Jack Rauton; Joybeth Taylor; Colton Venner
- Producer: Jay Rodgers

Gavin Adcock singles chronology
"Never Call Again" (2025)	"Wannabe" (2026)

"Never Call Again" is a song by American country music singer Gavin Adcock. It was released as a promotional single on March 21, 2025, and impacted country radio on June 16, 2025, as the debut single from his third studio album, Own Worst Enemy. Adock co-wrote the song with Jack Rauton, Joybeth Taylor, and Colton Venner.

== Critical reception ==
Holler praised Adcock's knack for delivering heartbroken ballads, comparing "Never Call Again" to earlier tracks such as "A Cigarette" and "Loose Strings".

== Credits and personnel ==
- Gavin Adcock – vocals
- Brody Frasier – electric guitar
- Michael Westbrook – electric guitar, acoustic guitar
- Miles McPherson – drums, percussion
- Dave Cohen – Hammond organ, Wurlitzer electronic piano
- Jay Rodgers – producer, mixing, bass, background vocals
- Joel Hastat – mastering

== Charts ==
Chart performance for "Never Call Again"
Chart (2025–2026)	Peak position
US Country Airplay (Billboard)	30
