= William V. Campbell Trophy =

College football award

William Campbell Trophy
- Awarded for: The American college football player with the best combination of academics, leadership, and on-field performance
- Country: United States
- Presented by: National Football Foundation

History
- First award: 1990
- Most recent: Vanderbilt tight end Eli Stowers
- Website: footballfoundation.org

The William V. Campbell Trophy, formerly the Vincent dePaul Draddy Trophy, is awarded by the National Football Foundation to the top college football player with the best combination of academics, leadership, and on-field performance. It is often considered to be the "Academic Heisman".

== History ==
The trophy is named for William V. Campbell, a businessman and former player and head coach at Columbia University. It was previously named in honor of Vincent dePaul Draddy, who served the National Football Foundation (NFF) and its College Football Hall of Fame for 33 years, including 19 years as the chairman of its board of directors. It has become the most prestigious and desirable "academic" award in college football. The trophy recognizes an individual as the absolute best in the country for his academic success, football performance, and exemplary leadership.

A scholar-athlete himself at Manhattan College, Draddy passionately believed in the premise that excellence on the football field could, and should, be consistent with academic distinction and the highest standards of civic leadership. He thought that young men who combined athletic performance with academic excellence should be recognized. After his death in July 1990, the NFF perpetuated his memory and beliefs by establishing a scholarship that would recognize the scholar-athlete who most fully embodies the ideals of the NFF.

While many major college football awards are theoretically open to players at all competitive levels, in practice, only players at NCAA Division I level win them. The Campbell Trophy is one of two such awards that has been won by a player at a lower level—Brandon Roberts of Washington University in St. Louis, an NCAA Division III school, in 2002. The other is the Ted Hendricks Award, which was won by Caleb Murphy of NCAA Division II Ferris State University in 2022.

In 2014, Fidelity Investments became the presenting sponsor of the Campbell Trophy, with its official name becoming the William V. Campbell Trophy, presented by Fidelity Investments. In 2013, the New York Athletic Club became the official home of the trophy, and it is now on display as part of its Hall of Fame. In 2019, Mazda began a three-year partnership as the presenting sponsor of the award. The $25,000 postgraduate scholarship that accompanies the trophy is endowed by HealthSouth Corporation.

== Winners ==
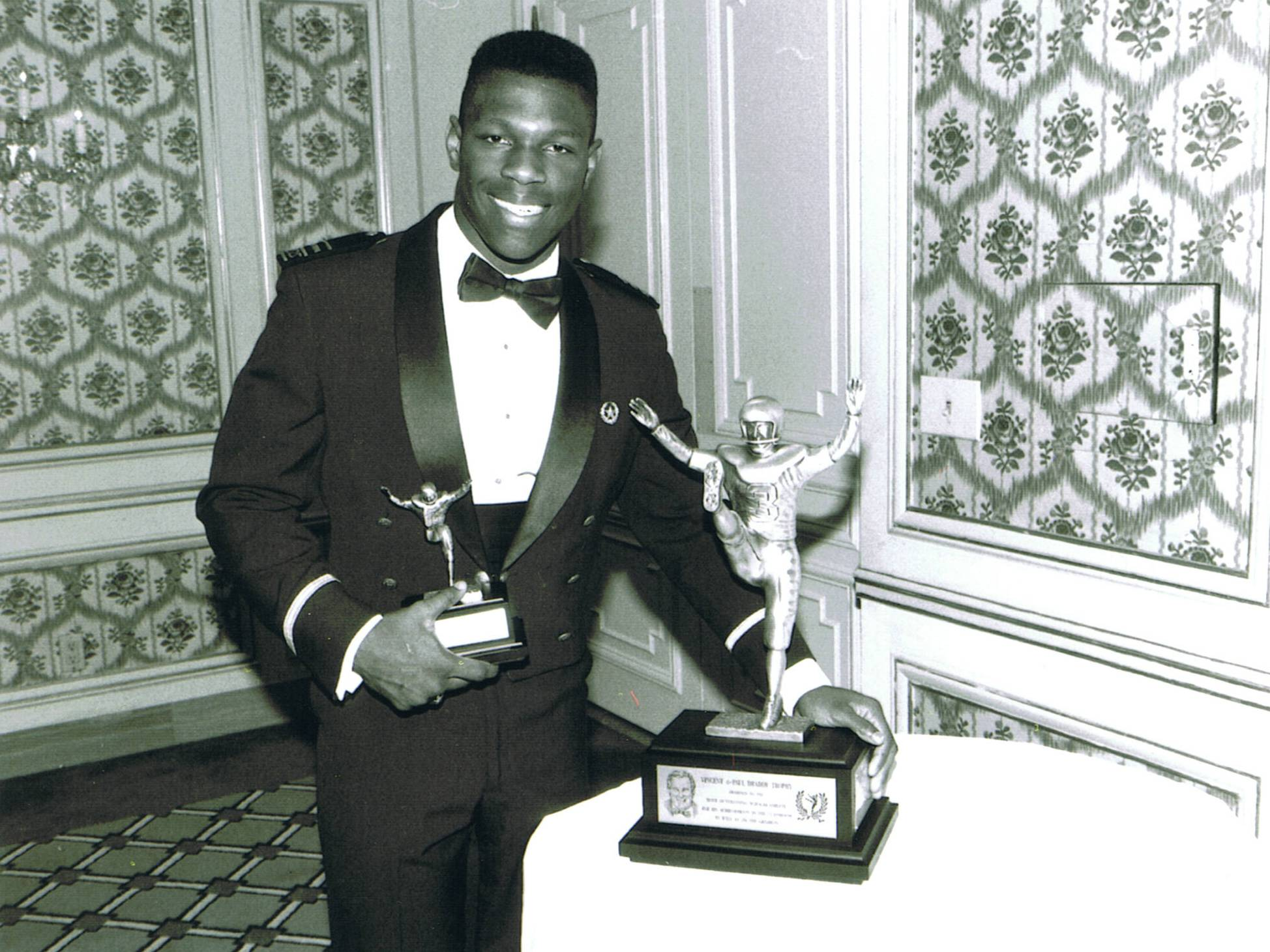
Chris Howard (Air Force) with the trophy in 1990

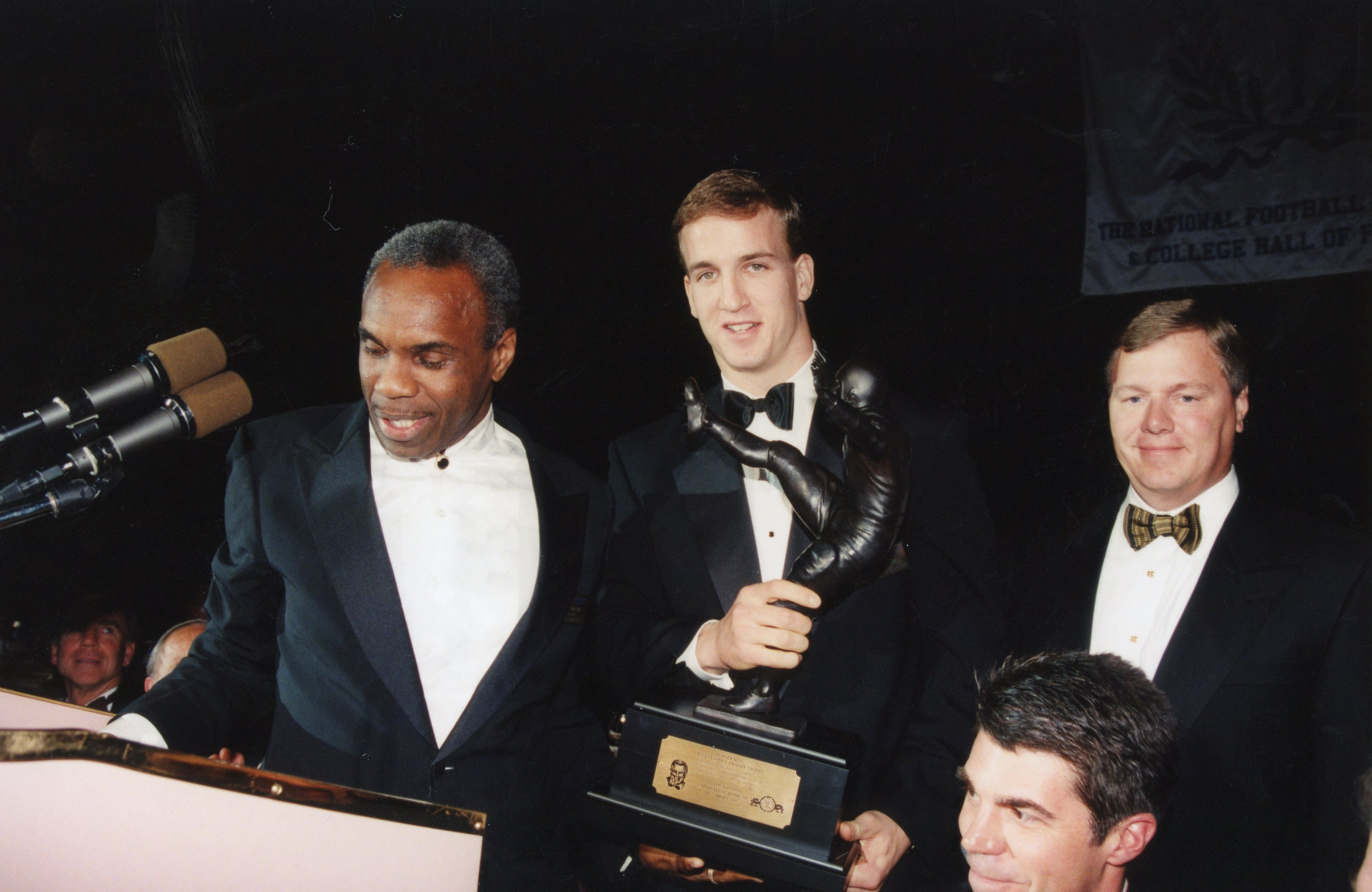
Peyton Manning (Tennessee) with the trophy in 1997

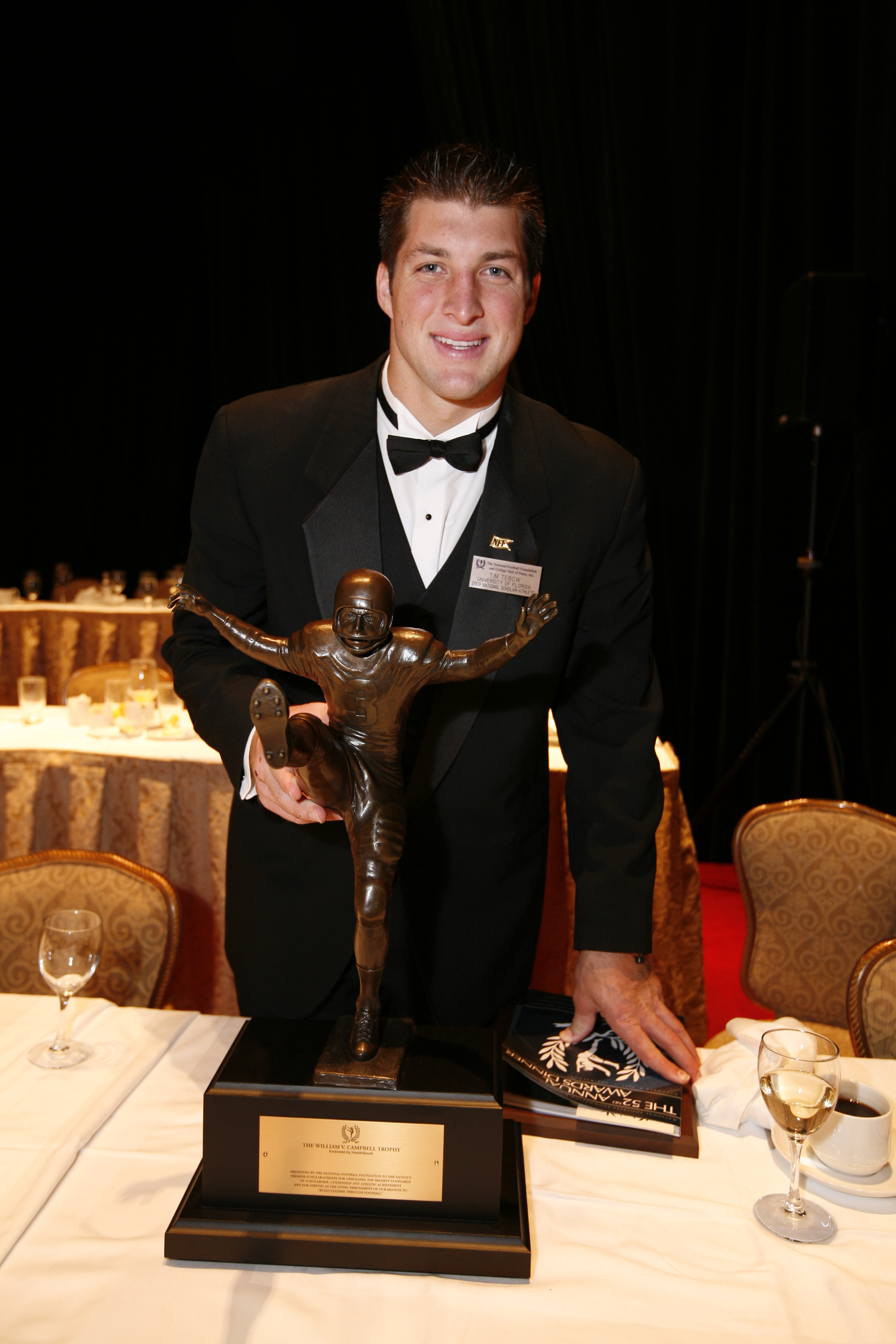
Tim Tebow (Florida) with the trophy in 2009

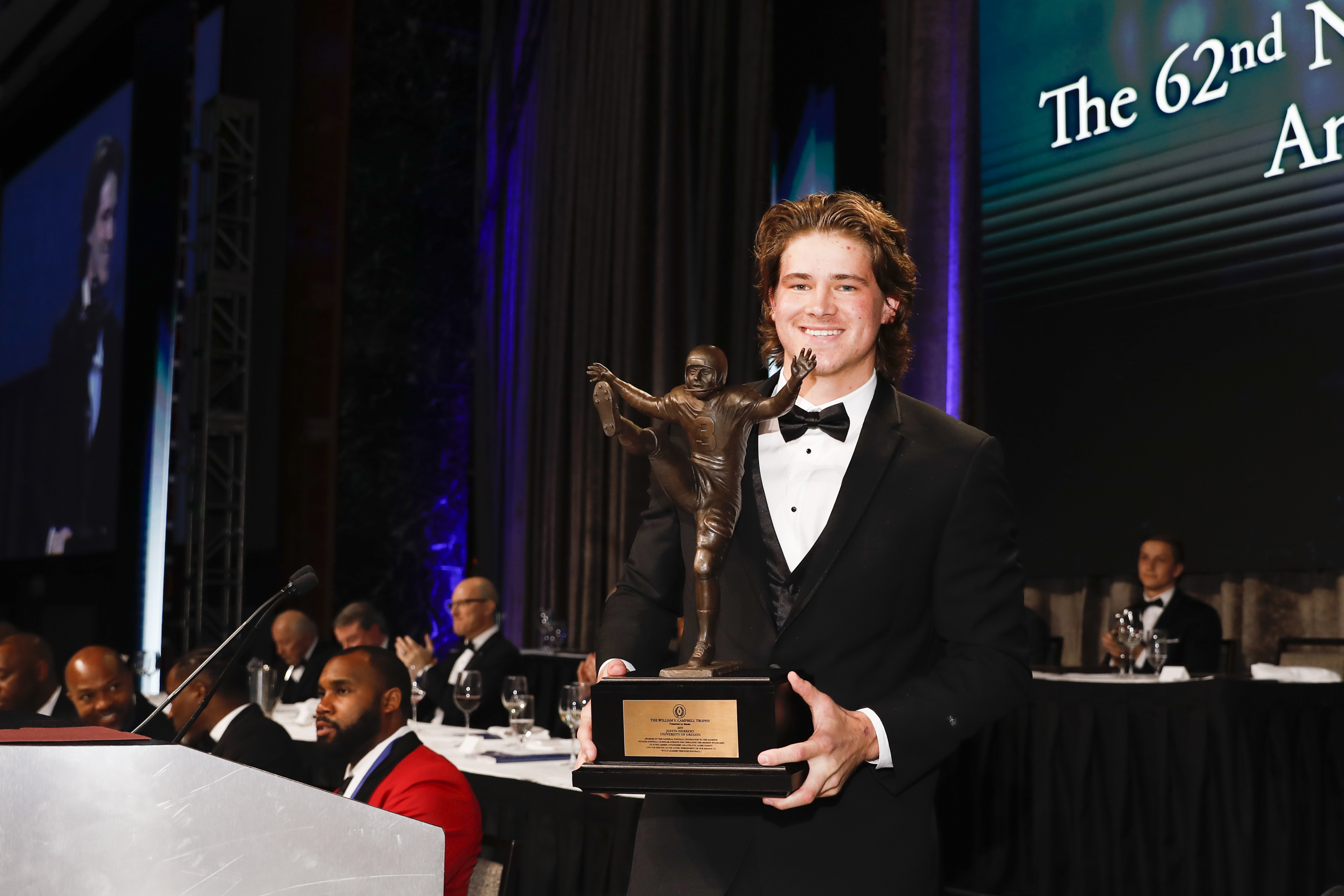
Justin Herbert (Oregon) with the trophy in 2019

List of annual recipients since inception in 1990.

List of William V. Campbell Trophy winners
Year	Player	Position	School
1990	Chris Howard	RB	Air Force
1991	Brad Culpepper	DT	Florida
1992	Jim Hansen	OT	Colorado
1993	Thomas D. Burns	LB	Virginia
1994	Rob Zatechka	G	Nebraska
1995	Bobby Hoying	QB	Ohio State
1996	Danny Wuerffel	QB	Florida (2)
1997	Peyton Manning	QB	Tennessee
1998	Matt Stinchcomb	OT	Georgia
1999	Chad Pennington	QB	Marshall
2000	Kyle Vanden Bosch	DE	Nebraska (2)
2001	Joaquin Gonzalez	OT	Miami (FL)
2002	Brandon Roberts	LB	Washington University
2003	Craig Krenzel	QB	Ohio State (2)
2004	Michael Muñoz	OT	Tennessee (2)
2005	Rudy Niswanger	C	LSU
2006	Brian Leonard	FB	Rutgers
2007	Dallas Griffin	C	Texas
2008	Alex Mack	C	California
2009	Tim Tebow	QB	Florida (3)
2010	Sam Acho	LB	Texas (2)
2011	Andrew Rodriguez	LB	Army
2012	Barrett Jones	G	Alabama
2013	John Urschel	G	Penn State
2014	David Helton	LB	Duke
2015	Ty Darlington	C	Oklahoma
2016	Zach Terrell	QB	Western Michigan
2017	Micah Kiser	LB	Virginia (2)
2018	Christian Wilkins	DT	Clemson
2019	Justin Herbert	QB	Oregon
2020	Brady White	QB	Memphis
2021	Charlie Kolar	TE	Iowa State
2022	Jack Campbell	LB	Iowa
2023	Bo Nix	QB	Oregon (2)
2024	Jalen Milroe	QB	Alabama (2)
2025	Eli Stowers	TE	Vanderbilt
