= Need To (Gavin Adcock song) =

2025 song by Gavin Adcock

Promotional single by Gavin Adcock

from the album Own Worst Enemy
- Released: February 7, 2025
- Studio: Full Moon Studio (Watkinsville, Georgia)
- Genre: Country
- Length: 3:09
- Label: Thrivin' Here; Warner Nashville
- Songwriters: Austin Goodloe; Casey Beathard; Joybeth Taylor; Tucker Beathard
- Producer: Jay Rodgers

"Need To" is a song by American country music singer Gavin Adcock, released on February 7, 2025 as the second promotional single from his third studio album, Own Worst Enemy (2025). It was written by Austin Goodloe, Casey Beathard, Joybeth Taylor and Tucker Beathard and produced by Jay Rodgers.

== Composition and lyrics ==
The song contains an instrumental of plucked guitar strings. In the beginning, it finds Gavin Adcock seeking advice from his mother for his predicament. While she has always taught him to be honest and fair in resolving issues, with guidance from the Bible, she surprisingly offers him alcohol for this particular trouble. He realizes that to move forward in life, sometimes the only solution is to simply let it be, which he reflects on the chorus: "Sometimes you need to let it all go / And hold what you got in your hand / Sometimes you need to blow away the flow / From a bottle or a glass or a can / Yes, sometimes you need to wash down / The weight of the world and watch it drown / Sometimes just one drink won't do / Sometimes you need two". In the second verse, Adcock hints that his problem stems from a failed relationship with a woman. He reflects on his mistakes and seeks to fix them to reconcile with her.

== Critical reception ==
Alli Patton of Holler wrote "Despite the sagacity it contains, 'Need To' has a fair amount of pluck. The swaggering tune arrives carried on slinky atmospherics produced by the pull of ambient strings and the shudder of scattered rhythms. The stalking groove is all at once chilling and enticing, as intoxicating as the words to which it creeps along." Madeleine O'Connell of Country Now stated that the song's mid-tempo pace "presents a contrast to his usual country/rock sound, thus honoring Adcock's captivating storytelling skills and his ability to confidently let his emotions do the talking."

== Charts ==
Chart performance for "Need To"
Chart (2025)	Peak position
US Bubbling Under Hot 100 (Billboard)	21
US Hot Country Songs (Billboard)	40
