= Gavin Adcock =

American singer-songwriter (born 1998)

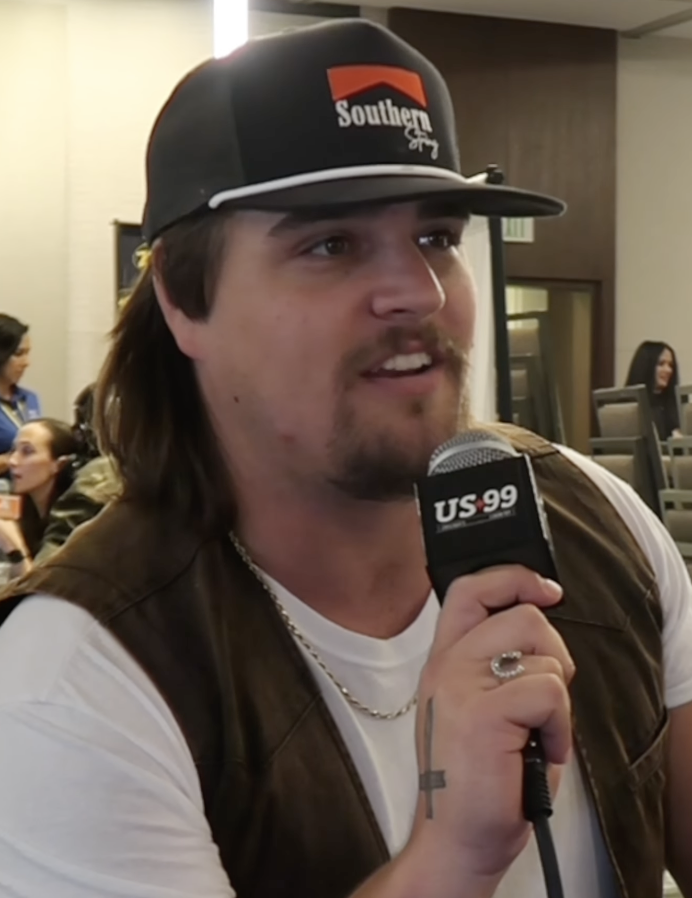
- Adcock in 2025

Background information
- Born: Gavin David Adcock; October 9, 1998 (age 28); Athens, Georgia, U.S.
- Genres: Country, country rock, outlaw country, southern rock
- Occupations: Singer; songwriter
- Instruments: Vocals; guitar
- Years active: 2021–present
- Labels: Warner Nashville
- Website: www.gavinadcockmusic.com

Gavin David Adcock (born October 9, 1998) is an American country music singer-songwriter.

== Early life ==
Adcock was born in Athens, Georgia, and grew up on his family's cattle farm in the small town of Watkinsville, Georgia. He went to Oconee County High School, where he played football as a defensive end and offensive guard, earning All-Region honors twice. From 2019 to 2022, he attended Georgia Southern University, majored in Management, and played NCAA football as a nose tackle.

Adcock was suspended from the Georgia Southern's football team after a video went viral on social media showing him chugging a beer prior to a game. Following the game he was removed for posting a Snapchat video making a sexual reference to his last name. His dismissal was announced by interim head coach Kevin Whitley during the team's weekly teleconference call with the media, with Whitley stating he "had a long conversation with Adcock after he violated a team policy".

== Music career ==
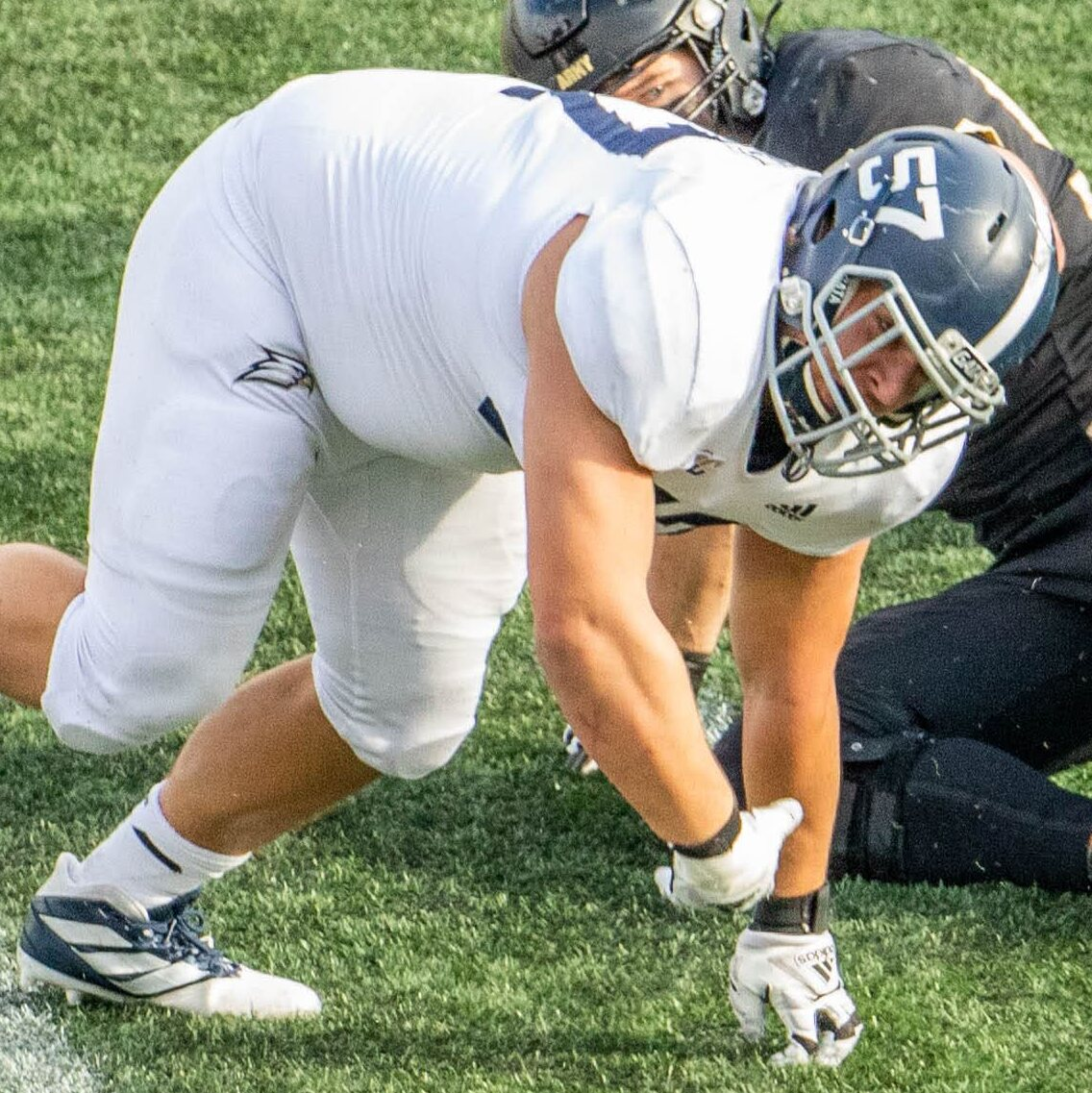
Adcock playing for the Georgia Southern Eagles football team in 2020

Adcock started writing songs in high school, but it was not until a knee injury during spring football in 2021 that he fully shifted his focus to music. While recovering, he released his first single "Ain't No Cure", officially kicking off his music career. He signed with Warner Music Nashville and is managed by Red Light Management. His breakout hit, "A Cigarette", has achieved over 150 million streams. In 2024, he released his debut album, Actin' Up Again.

== Personal life ==
In May 2025, Adcock was arrested in Wilson County, Tennessee, for reckless driving and having an open container of alcohol. He was released on a $1,000 bond. He was also arrested in 2023 for driving with a suspended license.

In June 2025, during one of his concerts, Adcock criticized Beyoncé and her album Cowboy Carter for topping the country charts, claiming it "ain't country music" and arguing that lifelong country artists should not have to compete with pop stars. His comments sparked debate over genre boundaries and inclusivity. Beyoncé did not respond publicly, while Adcock later defended his remarks on social media, saying he respected her but stood by his views on country music authenticity.

== Discography ==
=== Studio albums ===
Title	Details	Peak chart positions		
Title	Details	US	US Country	CAN
Bonfire Blackout	Released: May 19, 2023; Label: Thrivin' Here; Formats: Vinyl, digital download, streaming	—	—	—
Actin' Up Again	Released: August 2, 2024; Label: Thrivin' Here, Warner Nashville; Formats: CD, digital download, streaming	82	19	—
Own Worst Enemy	Released: August 15, 2025; Label: Thrivin' Here, Warner Nashville; Formats: CD, vinyl, digital download, streaming	14	4	53
The Day I Hang It Up	Released: October 2, 2026; Label: Thrivin' Here, Warner Nashville; Formats: CD, vinyl, digital download, streaming	42	10	—

=== Extended plays ===
Title	EP details
Thrivin Here	Release date: January 27, 2022; Label: Thrivin' Here; Formats: Digital download, streaming

=== Singles ===
Title	Year	Peak chart positions		Album
Title	Year	US Country Airplay	CAN Country	Album
"Never Call Again"	2025	30	—	Own Worst Enemy
"Wannabe"	2026	30	44	The Day I Hang It Up

==== Promotional singles ====
Title	Year	Peak chart positions			Certifications	Album
Title	Year	US	US Country	CAN	Certifications	Album
"Ain't No Cure"	2021	—	—	—		Thrivin Here & Bonfire Blackout
"Rowdy Southern Saturday"	2021	—	—	—		Thrivin Here
"Thrivin Here"	2021	—	—	—		Thrivin Here & Bonfire Blackout
"Whistling Wind"	2022	—	—	—		Non-album single
"Love to the Grave"	2022	—	—	—		Bonfire Blackout
"We Love Football"	2022	—	—	—		Non-album single
"Goin' Gone"	2022	—	—	—		Bonfire Blackout
"Caretaker"	2022	—	—	—		Non-album single
"I Know a Good Time"	2023	—	—	—		Bonfire Blackout
"I've Been a Stranger"	2023	—	—	—		Bonfire Blackout
"Deep End"	2023	—	—	—	RIAA: Gold; MC: Gold	Bonfire Blackout
"It's True"	2023	—	—	—		Non-album singles
"Down Town Down"	2023	—	—	—		Non-album singles
"Tore Me Up"	2023	—	—	—		Non-album singles
"Make Me Quit"	2023	—	—	—		Non-album singles
"A Cigarette"	2023	—	—	—	RIAA: Platinum; MC: Platinum	Actin' Up Again
"Four Leaf Clover"	2024	—	—	—	RIAA: Gold; MC: Gold	Actin' Up Again
"Past Actions"	2024	—	—	—		Actin' Up Again
"Sweetheart"	2024	—	—	—		Actin' Up Again
"Actin' Up Again"	2024	—	—	—		Actin' Up Again
"Run Your Mouth"	2024	—	—	—	RIAA: Gold; MC: Gold	Actin' Up Again
"Almost Gone"	2024	—	—	—		Non-album single
"Loose Strings"	2025	—	—	—		Own Worst Enemy
"Need To"	2025	— (Note: "Need To" did not enter the US Billboard Hot 100, but peaked at number 15 on the Bubbling Under Hot 100 chart.)	40	—		Own Worst Enemy
"Unlucky Strikes"	2025	—	—	—		Own Worst Enemy
"On One"	2025	—	—	—		Own Worst Enemy
"Morning Bail"	2025	—	—	—		Own Worst Enemy
"Last One to Know"	2025	45	14	44		Own Worst Enemy
"Sunset"	2025	—	—	—		Own Worst Enemy
"If I Can't Have You"	2025	—	—	—		Own Worst Enemy
"Turn Down the Lights"	2025	—	—	—		Own Worst Enemy
"Light a Fire"	2025	—	—	—		Own Worst Enemy
"Cheap Thrills" (with Hudson Westbrook)	2026	—	43	—		The Day I Hang It Up

=== Other charted songs ===
Title	Year	Peak chart positions		Album
Title	Year	US Bub.	US Country	Album
"Workin' Man"	2026	20	38	The Day I Hang It Up
"Us Again" (with Treaty Oak Revival)	2026	—	45	The Day I Hang It Up

== Tours ==
=== Headlining ===
- Actin' Up Again Tour (2024–25)
- Need To Tour (2025)
- The Day I Hang It Up Tour (2026–27)

=== Opening ===
- I'm the Problem Tour (with Morgan Wallen, 2025)

== Awards and nominations ==
Year	Association	Category	Nominated work	Result	Ref.
2026	Academy of Country Music Awards	New Male Artist of the Year	Himself	Pending	
