= Brandon Roberts =

American football player (born 1981)

- Born: Akron, Ohio, U.S.
- Occupation: Pediatric anesthesiologist
- Football career

Washington University
- Position: Linebacker

Brandon Roberts (born in Akron, Ohio) is an American former football player.

== Early life ==
Roberts is the youngest son of Jerry and Constance Roberts and younger brother of Brian. He attended Akron Public Schools until he entered high school. Because of his academic achievements, he was selected to attend Western Reserve Academy in Hudson, Ohio. Roberts transferred to Archbishop Hoban High School for his junior and senior years, where he graduated in 1999.

== College career ==
Roberts attended Washington University in St. Louis as a member of the university's John B. Ervin Scholars Program and a recipient of the School of Engineering's Stanley C. Pace Endowed Scholarship. One of the most well-balanced scholar-athletes in NCAA Division III history, Roberts earned high honors in working towards a degree in biomedical engineering, while establishing himself as one of the nation's elite linebackers. A regular dean's list selection, Roberts also earned Verizon Academic All-America honors in each of his sophomore through senior seasons. Throughout his college career, Roberts accumulated accolades including the Washington University 2003 Gwendolyn Drew Award for superior academic standing and contributing positively to varsity athletics, the 2002 National Association of Collegiate Directors of Athletics Postgraduate Scholarship Finalist Award, and the Washington University 2003 Ethan A.H Shepley Award for leadership, scholarship, and service to the campus community.

As a two-time All-Conference (UAA) First Team selection, Roberts played on a defense that ranked in the top 20 nationally in each of his last three seasons. Through six games in his senior season in 2002, Roberts led the UAA conference with 68 tackles, ranking him 19th in the nation, before suffering a season and career ending knee injury prior to beginning conference play. With 338 career tackles and 12.5 sacks, he ranks among the greatest defensive players ever to play for Washington University. He was inducted into the Washington University in St. Louis Sports Hall of Fame in 2016.

In December 2002, Roberts' athletic and academic careers were highlighted when he was selected as the winner of the National Football Foundation’s Vincent DePaul Draddy Trophy (renamed the William V. Campbell Trophy in 2009). Often referred to as the "Academic Heisman," the award is given to the nation's top scholar-athlete and awards a $25,000 postgraduate scholarship. Roberts is the first and only non-Division I player to receive the award. The Campbell Trophy has become one of college football's most sought and competitive awards, recognizing an individual as the absolute best in the country for his combined academic success, football performance, and exemplary community leadership. The award comes with a 24-inch, 25-pound bronze trophy, which is prominently displayed in an exhibit at the New York Athletic Club's Hall of Fame.

== Life after football ==
Although Roberts was accepted into medical school as a senior in college, he was allowed to defer his admission for a year in order to serve as an academic coach with the National Football Foundation’s Play it Smart Program. Roberts worked as an academic mentor and counselor for student athletes at Vashon High School where he conducted tutoring sessions, study halls, and ACT preparation classes, and also organized community service events. He also volunteered as a defensive assistant for the Vashon High School junior varsity and varsity football teams, and he helped the varsity team reach and win their first state playoff game in school history.

Roberts subsequently returned to his home state of Ohio for medical school at Case Western Reserve University School of Medicine. In 2008, he was awarded the Case Western Reserve School of Medicine’s Dean’s Award, recognizing a member of the graduating class who exemplifies outstanding service and dedication to his classmates in assisting in the achievement of their educational goals. After graduation in 2008, Roberts returned to St. Louis’ Washington University School of Medicine for his residency/fellowship at Barnes-Jewish Hospital/St. Louis Children's Hospital. He is a pediatric anesthesiologist and lives in Akron, OH with his wife and children.
