= Something to Lose =

2026 single by Stella Lefty and Vincent Mason

Single by Stella Lefty and Vincent Mason

from the album Long Way Home
- Released: September 28, 2026
- Genre: Country
- Length: 2:55
- Label: Atlantic Outpost
- Songwriters: Stella Lefty; Grace Enger; Jon Decious; Luke Dick
- Producers: Joe Reeves; Brett Truitt

Stella Lefty singles chronology
"I Know I Know" (2026)	"Something to Lose" (2026)	"Good at Leaving" (2026)

Vincent Mason singles chronology
"Damned If I Do" (2026)	"Something to Lose" (2026)

Lyric videos
- "Something to Lose" (lyric video) on YouTube
- "Something to Lose" (official lyric video) on YouTube

"Something to Lose" is a song by American country music singers Stella Lefty and Vincent Mason. The song impacted country radio on September 28, 2026, as the second single from Lefty's debut album, Long Way Home.

== Composition ==
The song incorporates "pedal steel and warm acoustics" and explores the moment when two people fall in love with each other. Stella Lefty begins her song with her verse, stepping into the role of a "stubborn" girl who initially refused to be emotionally close to her lover. Vincent Mason sings the second verse from the perspective of her lover, about how their connection has helped change his view of life. The singers perform the final chorus together.

== Critical reception ==
James Daykin of Entertainment Focus commented that the song "perfectly showcases Lefty's ability to blend vulnerability with wide-eyed optimism", and "Mason's presence adds a grounded, complementary warmth to Lefty's airy vocal, creating a push-and-pull dynamic that elevates the song beyond a typical duet". Noah Wade of Ones to Watch noted the singers were "playing to their strengths" by focusing on the fragility and curiosity of a new relationship rather than attempting to emulate the vocal power or emotional scope of duets by country singers Faith Hill and Tim McGraw.

== Charts ==
Chart performance for "Something to Lose"
Chart (2026)	Peak position
Canada (Canadian Hot 100)	60
US Billboard Hot 100	40
US Country Airplay (Billboard)	21
US Hot Country Songs (Billboard)	15

== Certifications ==
Certifications for "Something to Lose"
Region	Certification	Certified units/sales
Canada (Music Canada)	Gold	40,000^{‡}
^{‡} Sales+streaming figures based on certification alone.
