= Vincent Mason (singer) =

- Born: Vincent L. Mason; November 10, 2000 (age 26); Roswell, Georgia, U.S.
- Genres: Country; contemporary country
- Occupations: Singer; songwriter
- Instruments: Vocals; guitar
- Years active: 2022–present
- Labels: Interscope; MCA Nashville; Music Soup
- Website: vincentmasonmusic.com

Vincent L. Mason (born November 10, 2000) is an American country music singer-songwriter and guitarist. He gained widespread attention in 2024 with his breakout single "Hell Is a Dance Floor". He released his debut studio album, There I Go, in 2025 featuring his debut radio single "Wish You Well" and viral song "Damned If I Do".

== Early life ==
Mason grew up north of Atlanta, in Roswell, Georgia by his father, an interior designer, and his mother, a pediatric dentist. His mother exposed him to pop and singer-songwriter music including Maroon 5, Jack Johnson, and John Mayer. He was eventually intrigued by country and modern country-rock sounds which blends country storytelling and soulful/pop-rock sensibilities. While attending King's Ridge Christian School in Alpharetta, Georgia with a focus on sports, he was given his first guitar during his sophomore year and as a senior, he was taking music more seriously.

He attended the University of Mississippi in Oxford, where he began writing original songs and transferred to Lipscomb University in Nashville to study music. When the COVID-19 pandemic shut down in-person classes, he focused heavily on songwriting and started posting original songs online.

== Music career ==
=== Breakthrough and the beginning of a career (2022–2024) ===
Mason began releasing music in 2022, beginning with independent recordings and steadily working toward a professional career. His first song, "Everybody Loves Her" was released on February 11, 2022. In 2023, he began gaining live experience by touring with Ashley Cooke and opening for artists including Parker McCollum and Niko Moon. He released several singles, "A Little Too Good", "Didn't Wanna Settle Down", and "Good Thing Going" among them, leading to his debut EP A Little Too Good on December 23, 2023. In 2024, the moody single "Hell Is a Dance Floor" went viral on TikTok and became his first Gold certified single in the United States. On May 24, 2024, he released a second EP Can't Just Be Me, which he co-wrote and co-produced. Mason signed to a major label partnership with Interscope Records, UMG Nashville, and Music Soup for the release. Additionally, he signed a publishing deal with Concord Music Publishing/Hang Your Hat Music the same month. In September 2024, he made his debut at the Grand Ole Opry. He collaborated with Gavin Adcock for "Almost Gone" in November 2024.

=== There I Go (2025–present) ===
He opened for Riley Green, Luke Bryan, Megan Moroney, and other artists. "Wish You Well" was released on February 24, 2025, as the debut radio single and lead single from his debut studio album. It reached the Top 20 on country radio. In April 2025, he was named Billboard's Country Rookie of the Month. In promotion for his debut album, he released "Damned If I Do" on July 18, 2025, which went viral on TikTok becoming his first entry on the Billboard Hot 100 chart, peaking at No. 77. It later became his first Platinum single and sent to country radio in July. On November 7, 2025, Mason released his debut studio album There I Go. After making his national TV debut on the The Kelly Clarkson Show on NBC he went on the Today Show. The album was supported by the headline There I Go tour in partnership with Monster Energy Outbreak. He received his first nomination for ACM New Male Artist of the Year in April 2026 and embarked on his first stadium tour opening for Morgan Wallen on Wallen's Still The Problem tour.

Mason and his girlfriend Stella Lefty's collaboration "Something to Lose" went viral on TikTok before impacting country radio in September 2026. It climbed to No. 40 on the Billboard Hot 100, Mason's highest entry to date. In June 2026, he released "What You Want." In November 2026, Mason announced his second headline tour "When You're Not Around," launching in February 2027, with support from Jacob Hackworth, Benny G, and Phil Kane.

== Personal life ==
As of July 2026, Mason is in a relationship with fellow singer-songwriter Stella Lefty.

== Discography ==
=== Studio albums ===
| Title | Details |
|---|---|
| There I Go | Released: November 7, 2025; Label: Interscope, MCA Nashville, Music Soup; Formats: Digital download, streaming |

=== Extended plays ===
| Title | Details |
|---|---|
| A Little Too Good | Released: December 23, 2023; Label: Interscope, MCA Nashville, Music Soup; Formats: Digital download, streaming |
| Can't Just Be Me | Released: May 24, 2024; Label: Interscope, MCA Nashville, Music Soup; Formats: Digital download, streaming |

=== Singles ===
==== As lead artist ====
| Title | Year | Peak chart positions | | | | Certifications | Album |
| Title | Year | US | US Country | US Country Airplay | CAN Country | Certifications | Album |
|---|---|---|---|---|---|---|---|
| "Wish You Well" | 2025 | — | 41 | 16 | 28 | | There I Go |
| "Damned If I Do" | 2026 | 77 | 21 | 43 | — | RIAA: Platinum | There I Go |

==== As featured artist ====
| Title | Year | Peak chart positions | | | | Certifications | Album |
| Title | Year | US | US Country | US Country Airplay | CAN | Certifications | Album |
|---|---|---|---|---|---|---|---|
| "Something to Lose" (Stella Lefty featuring Vincent Mason) | 2026 | 40 | 15 | 21 | 60 | MC: Gold | Is This Heaven? |

=== Promotional singles ===
| Title | Year | Peak chart positions | | | Certifications | Album |
| Title | Year | US Bubbling | US Country | NZ Hot | Certifications | Album |
|---|---|---|---|---|---|---|
| "Everybody Loves Her" | 2022 | — | — | — | | Non-album single |
| "May Be" | 2024 | — | — | — | | Can't Just Be Me |
| "Hell Is a Dance Floor" | 2024 | — | 49 | — | RIAA: Gold | There I Go |
| "Livin' Proof" | 2024 | — | — | — | | Can't Just Be Me |
| "Heart Like This" | 2024 | — | — | — | | Non-album single |
| "Train of Thought" | 2024 | — | — | — | | Non-album single |
| "Speak of the Devil" | 2024 | — | — | — | | Non-album single |
| "Almost Gone" (with Gavin Adcock) | 2024 | — | — | — | | Own Worst Enemy |
| "Waitin' on You to Wear Off" | 2025 | — | — | — | | Non-album single |
| "Painkiller" | 2025 | — | — | — | | There I Go |
| "Days Are Numbered" | 2025 | — | — | — | | There I Go |
| "Little Miss" | 2025 | — | — | — | | There I Go |
| "There I Go" | 2025 | — | — | — | | There I Go |
| "What You Want" | 2026 | 1 | 32 | 38 | | Non-album single |

== Tours ==
=== Headlining ===
- Hell Is a Dance Floor Tour (2025)
- There I Go Tour (2026)
- When You're Not Around Tour (2027)

=== Supporting act ===
- Shot in the Dark Tour (2023; with Ashley Cooke)
- Burn It Down Tour (2024; with Parker McCollum)
- Actin' Up Again Tour (2024; with Gavin Adcock)
- Am I Okay? Tour (2025; with Megan Moroney)
- Damn Country Music Tour (2025; with Riley Green)
- Parker McCollum Tour (2025–26; with McCollum)
- Country Song Came On Tour (2025; with Luke Bryan)
- Ain't Enough Road Tour (2025; with Jordan Davis)
- Still the Problem Tour (2026; with Morgan Wallen)
- Soundtrack to Life Tour (2026; with Thomas Rhett)

== Awards and nominations ==
| Year | Association | Category | Nominated work | Result | Ref. |
|---|---|---|---|---|---|
| 2026 | Academy of Country Music Awards | New Male Artist of the Year | Himself | Nominated | |
